= 2010 Royal Bank Cup =

Tournament details
- Venue: Credit Union Place in Dauphin, Manitoba
- Dates: May 1, 2010 – May 9, 2010
- Teams: 5

Final positions
- Champions: Vernon Vipers (6th title)
- Runners-up: Dauphin Kings

Tournament statistics
- Games played: 13
- Scoring leader: Kellen Jones (9 pts.) (Vernon)

Awards
- MVP: Shane Luke (Dauphin)

The 2010 Royal Bank Cup was the 40th Junior "A" 2010 ice hockey National Championship for the Canadian Junior Hockey League. The 2010 Royal Bank Cup marked the 40th consecutive year a national championship has been awarded to this skill level since the breakaway of Major Junior hockey in 1970.

The Royal Bank Cup was competed for by the winners of the Doyle Cup, Anavet Cup, Dudley Hewitt Cup, the Fred Page Cup and the host city, the Dauphin Kings of the Manitoba Junior Hockey League.

The tournament was hosted by the Dauphin Kings and ran from May 1 to May 9 of 2010 with games played at the Credit Union Place in Dauphin, Manitoba. Charlie Major will be appearing as a special guest the night before the opening game.

In the end, the defending 2009 Royal Bank Cup champion Vernon Vipers were too much for the hometown Dauphin Kings, crushing them 8-1 in the final. In another lopsided results, during the round robin, the Brockville Braves crushed the Oakville Blades 11-2 to tie two different tournament records (goal by a winning team in one game, one game spread).

== Teams ==
- Dauphin Kings (Host)

Regular Season: 50-11-1-0 (1st Overall in MJHL)
Playoffs: Defeated Neepawa Natives 4-0, Defeated Swan Valley Stampeders 4-1, Defeated Winnipeg Saints 4-0, Defeated La Ronge Ice Wolves 4-1 for Anavet Cup.

- Brockville Braves (East)

Regular Season: 52-8-0-2 (1st Overall in CJHL)
Playoffs: Defeated Kemptville 73's 4-0, Defeated Ottawa Jr. Senators 4-0, Lost to Pembroke Lumber Kings 1-4, Won Fred Page Cup (4-0).

- La Ronge Ice Wolves (West)

Regular Season: 29-21-3-5 (7th Overall in SJHL)
Playoffs: Defeated Humboldt Broncos 3-0, Defeated Flin Flon Bombers 4-2, Defeated Battlefords North Stars 4-2, Defeated Yorkton Terriers 4-2, Lost to Dauphin Kings 1-4 for Anavet Cup.

- Oakville Blades (Central)

Regular Season: 46-9-0-1 (2nd Overall in OJAHL)
Playoffs: Defeated Aurora Tigers 4-1, Defeated Georgetown Raiders 4-1, Defeated Kingston Voyageurs 4-3, Defeated Newmarket Hurricanes 4-2 for Buckland Cup, Won Dudley Hewitt Cup (4-0).

- Vernon Vipers (Pacific)

Regular Season: 51-6-0-3 (1st Overall in BCHL)
Playoffs: Defeated Quesnel Millionaires 4-2, Defeated Penticton Vees 4-2, Defeated Powell River Kings 4-3, Defeated Spruce Grove Saints 4-3 for Doyle Cup.

== Tournament ==
=== Round Robin ===
Pos	League (Ticket)	Team	Pld	W	L	GF	GA	GD	Qualification
1	MJHL (Host)	Dauphin Kings	4	4	0	17	13	+4	Semi-final
2	BCHL (Doyle Cup)	Vernon Vipers	4	3	1	18	13	+5	Semi-final
3	CJHL (Fred Page Cup)	Brockville Braves	4	2	2	21	12	+9	Semi-final
4	SJHL (Anavet Cup finalist)	La Ronge Ice Wolves	4	1	3	10	15	−5	Semi-final
5	OJAHL (Dudley Hewitt Cup)	Oakville Blades	4	0	4	11	24	−13	

==== Results ====
Game	Home team	Score	Away team	Score	Notes
Saturday, May 1, 2010
1	Oakville Blades	2	La Ronge Ice Wolves	3	OT Final - Shots: 45-29 Oak
2	Vernon Vipers	5	Dauphin Kings	6	OT Final - Shots: 35-33 Dau
Sunday, May 2, 2010
3	Brockville Braves	11	Oakville Blades	2	Final - Shots: 44-29 Bro
4	La Ronge Ice Wolves	2	Vernon Vipers	4	Final - Shots: 35-26 Ver
Monday, May 3, 2010
5	Dauphin Kings	3	Brockville Braves	2	Final - Shots: 36-35 Dau
Tuesday, May 4, 2010
6	Oakville Blades	3	Vernon Vipers	5	Final - Shots: 26-22 Oak
7	La Ronge Ice Wolves	2	Dauphin Kings	3	Final - Shots: 47-35 Dau
Wednesday, May 5, 2010
8	Vernon Vipers	4	Brockville Braves	2	Final - Shots: 44-27 Ver
9	Dauphin Kings	5	Oakville Blades	4	Final - Shots: 33-32 Oak
Thursday, May 6, 2010
10	Brockville Braves	6	La Ronge Ice Wolves	3	Final - Shots: 44-33 Bro

=== Semi-final ===
Game	Home team	Score	Away team	Score	Notes
Saturday, May 8, 2010
11	Vernon Vipers	2	Brockville Braves	0	Final - Shots: 35-20 Ver
12	Dauphin Kings	6	La Ronge Ice Wolves	2	Final - Shots: 40-35 Dau

=== Final ===
Game	Home team	Score	Away team	Score	Notes
Sunday, May 9, 2010
13	Dauphin Kings	1	Vernon Vipers	8	Final - Shots: 36-24 Ver

== Awards ==
Roland Mercier Trophy (Tournament MVP): Shane Luke (Dauphin Kings)
Top Forward: Scott Arnold (Brockville Braves)
Top Defencemen: Dustin Stevenson (La Ronge Ice Wolves)
Top Goaltender: Justin Gilbert (Brockville Braves)
Tubby Smaltz Trophy (Sportsmanship): Kellen Jones (Vernon Vipers)

== Roll of League Champions ==
- AJHL - Spruce Grove Saints
- BCHL - Vernon Vipers
- CCHL - Newmarket Hurricanes
- CJHL - Pembroke Lumber Kings
- MJAHL - Woodstock Slammers
- MJHL - Dauphin Kings
- NOJHL - Abitibi Eskimos
- OJAHL - Oakville Blades
- QJAAAHL - Terrebonne Cobras
- SIJHL - Fort William North Stars
- SJHL - La Ronge Ice Wolves

== See also ==
- Canadian Junior Hockey League
- Royal Bank Cup
- Anavet Cup
- Doyle Cup
- Dudley Hewitt Cup
- Fred Page Cup
