= List of ice hockey teams in Saskatchewan =

The province of Saskatchewan is home to five Western Hockey League teams, twelve Junior A teams – eleven in the Saskatchewan Junior Hockey League and one in the Alberta Junior Hockey League – and one Junior B league comprising thirteen teams. The province is also home to two universities teams playing in the Canada West Universities Athletic Association and one college team that plays in the Alberta Colleges Athletics Conference.

The first professional ice hockey teams in Saskatchewan were the Regina Capitals and the Saskatoon Sheiks who first played in the Western Canada Hockey League's (WCHL) inaugural season in 1921–22. After the collapse of the WCHL following the 1925–26 season, these teams and the Moose Jaw Maroons joined the Prairie Hockey League (PHL). The PHL folded after two seasons, which resulted in the end of professional hockey in Saskatchewan. In 1952 professional hockey returned to Saskatchewan when the Saskatoon Quakers joined the minor-pro Western Hockey League (WHL). The Quakers folded in 1956 and were replaced by the Saskatoon/St. Paul Regals who split their home games between Saskatoon and St. Paul, Minnesota for the 1957–58 season. The following season, the Regals became the second incarnation of the Saskatoon Quakers, abandoning St. Paul, but folded after just one season, leaving the province without professional hockey once again. Since then, there have been a number of attempts to return professional hockey to Saskatchewan. In 1983, a bid to buy and relocate the National Hockey League's St. Louis Blues to Saskatoon was vetoed by the NHL, who preferred to find an owner to keep the team in St. Louis. In 2009, Ice Edge attempted to purchase the bankrupt Phoenix Coyotes with a plan to keep the team in Phoenix, but to also play five home games a year in Saskatoon. However, The Conference Board of Canada has reported that Saskatoon's population of approximately 250,000 is well below the minimum 750,000 required for an NHL team to survive economically. Additionally, Saskatoon was rumoured as a possible destination for the American Hockey League Manitoba Moose after the Atlanta Thrashers relocated to Winnipeg in 2011. However, the Moose eventually relocated to St. John's, Newfoundland, due in part to the presence of the Saskatoon Blades occupancy of the Credit Union Centre.

The first recorded Provincial Junior Hockey League was organized in the 1916–17, when E.C. Corbeau donated the Corbeau Cup. The first champions were the Regina Arenas. The 1916–17 season was also the first season of the Regina Pats, who are the oldest continuously operating junior team in Canada. In 1919 the Saskatchewan Amateur Hockey Association created the Abbott Cup in memory of E.L. (Hick) Abbott who died in the First World War. The Abbot Cup was originally awarded to the best Junior "A" team in Western Canada. After Western Hockey League was sanctioned as the top junior league in Western Canada and the creation of the Ed Chynoweth Cup, the Abbot Cup was awarded to the best junior "B" team in Western Canada until 1999 when the trophy was retired.

Organized women's hockey has been played in Saskatchewan since at least 1912 when a women's team was set up at the University of Saskatchewan. However, as women's hockey only became a Canadian Interuniversity Sport (CIS) sport in 1997–98, they played unsanctioned competitions against other university and local women's teams, winning the Western Canadian women’s inter-university hockey league champion in 1921 and 1922. They also won the Saskatoon women's city championship in 1929, 1932, 1939 and 1942. Women's hockey was an intramural sport between 1955 and 1976, before the creation of the Labatt Cup: Women’s Hockey Tournament, later renamed the Western Canada Cup, in 1979. The University of Saskatchewan played in the first CIS sanctioned women's championship in the 1997–98 season, while the University of Regina women's team joined one year later. The University of Regina won their first, and only, conference title in 2000–01. In 2004, the Saskatchewan Prairie Ice began play in the minor-pro Western Women's Hockey League based out of Lumsden located near Regina. After three losing seasons the team folded in 2007 due to financial reasons. Saskatchewan has won one Abby Hoffman Cup, awarded to the Canadian senior women's "A" champion, won by the Notre Dame Hounds in 2010–11.

This list does not include teams below the junior age group, or senior teams below the AAA level.

== Major professional ==
=== Western Canada Hockey League ===
The Western Canada Hockey League was the first major-professional league on the prairies. Founded in 1921, it collapsed in 1926.

| Team | City | Existed | League titles | Notes |
|---|---|---|---|---|
| Regina Capitals | Regina | 1921–25 | 1 | Relocated to Portland in 1925 and became the Rosebuds |
| Saskatoon Sheiks | Saskatoon | 1921–26 | 0 | Relocated to Moose Jaw during first season, then back to Saskatoon in the off-season; known as the Saskatoon Crescents from 1922–23 |

== Minor professional ==
=== Western Hockey League ===
The professional Western Hockey League was formed following a merger with the Pacific Coast Hockey League and the Western Canada Senior Hockey League. The Saskatoon Quakers lost their amateur status when they joined the new league.

| Team | City | Existed | Lester Patrick Cups | Notes |
|---|---|---|---|---|
| Saskatoon Quakers | Saskatoon | 1951–56, 1958–59 | 1 | |
| Saskatoon/St. Paul Regals | Saskatoon/St. Paul | 1957–58 | 0 | Split home schedule between Saskatoon and St. Paul, MN; re-branded as Saskatoon Quakers before 1958–59 season |

== Junior ==
With no professional teams, the top level of hockey in Saskatchewan is junior. Five teams compete in the Major-Junior Western Hockey League, while the Junior-A Saskatchewan Junior Hockey League comprises 12 teams. The border city of Lloydminster competes in the Alberta Junior Hockey League.

=== Western Hockey League ===
Current teams

| Team | City | Established | President's Cups | Memorial Cups | Notes |
|---|---|---|---|---|---|
| Moose Jaw Warriors | Moose Jaw | 1984 | 0 | 0 | Founded in 1980 as the Winnipeg Warriors |
| Prince Albert Raiders | Prince Albert | 1982 | 2 | 1 | Founding predates the WHL |
| Regina Pats | Regina | 1966 | 2 | 4* | Franchise founded in 1917 |
| Saskatoon Blades | Saskatoon | 1966 | 0 | 0 | Founding predates the WHL |
| Swift Current Broncos | Swift Current | 1967–74, 1986 | 2 | 1 | Founded in 1967; Existed as the Lethbridge Broncos from 1974–86 |

*Three of the Regina Pats' Memorial Cups predate the WHL.

Former teams

| Team | City | Existed | President's Cups | Memorial Cups | Notes |
|---|---|---|---|---|---|
| Estevan Bruins | Estevan | 1966–71 | 1 | 0 | Founding predates the WHL; became the New Westminster Bruins in 1971 |
| Moose Jaw Canucks | Moose Jaw | 1966–68 | 1 | 0 | Founding predates the WHL; left WCHL to rejoin SJHL |
| Weyburn Red Wings | Weyburn | 1966–68 | 0 | 0 | Founding predates the WHL; left WCHL to rejoin SJHL |

=== Alberta Junior Hockey League ===
| Team | City | Established | League titles | Doyle Cups | Royal Bank Cups | Notes |
|---|---|---|---|---|---|---|
| Lloydminster Bobcats | Lloydminster | 1988 | 0 | 0 | 0 | Previously the Lloydminster Lancers of the SJHL (1982–88); known as the Lloydminster Blazers 1988–05. The team's arena lies on the Saskatchewan side of the biprovincial city, one block from the border. |

=== Saskatchewan Junior Hockey League ===
Current teams

| Team | City | Established | League titles | Anavet Cups | Royal Bank Cups | Notes |
|---|---|---|---|---|---|---|
| Battlefords North Stars | Battlefords | 1973 | 1 | 1 | 0 | Known as the Battlefords Barons (1973–83) |
| Estevan Bruins | Estevan | 1971 | 2 | 2 | 0 | |
| Humboldt Broncos | Humboldt | 1970 | 10 | 7 | 2 | |
| Kindersley Klippers | Kindersley | 1993 | 2 | 1 | 0 | Founded in 1991 as the Saskatoon Titans |
| La Ronge Ice Wolves | La Ronge | 1998 | 2 | 0 | 0 | |
| Melfort Mustangs | Melfort | 1988 | 2 | 1 | 0 | |
| Melville Millionaires | Melville | 1970 | 0 | 0 | 0 | Melville Millionaires' name dates back to 1915 |
| Nipawin Hawks | Nipawin | 1986 | 1 | 1 | 0 | |
| Notre Dame Hounds | Wilcox | 1987 | 1 | 1 | 1 | Only team to win the National Championship in inaugural season. |
| Weyburn Red Wings | Weyburn | 1968 | 8 | 5 | 2 | Transferred from Western Hockey League |
| Yorkton Terriers | Yorkton | 1972 | 4 | 2 | 1 | |

Former teams

| Team | City | Existed | League titles | Anavet Cups | Royal Bank Cups | Notes |
|---|---|---|---|---|---|---|
| Lebret Eagles | Lebret | 1993–2001 | 0 | 0 | 0 | |
| Lloydminster Lancers | Lloydminster | 1982–88 | 0 | 0 | 0 | Transferred to the Alberta Junior Hockey League |
| Moose Jaw Canucks | Moose Jaw | 1968–84 | 0 | 0 | 0 | |
| Prince Albert Raiders | Prince Albert | 1972–82 | 8 | 7 | 2 | Transferred to the Western Hockey League |
| Regina Blues | Regina | 1968–82 | 0 | 0 | 0 | |
| Regina Silver Foxes | Regina | 1972–76 | 0 | 0 | 0 | |
| Saskatoon Olympics | Saskatoon | 1968–82 | 0 | 0 | 0 | |
| Saskatoon Rage | Saskatoon | 1987–99 | 0 | 0 | 0 | Founded in 1987 as the Minot Americans; known as the Minot Top Guns (1994–97) and Beardy's Rage (1997–98) |
| Swift Current Broncos | Swift Current | 1974–86 | 1 | 0 | 0 | Known as the Swift Current Indians (1983–86) |

=== Junior B Hockey leagues ===
The Prairie Junior Hockey League merged with the North Saskatchewan Junior B Hockey League in 2007 to create a more manageable province-wide league.

| League | Region | Established | Keystone Cup titles | Notes |
|---|---|---|---|---|
| Prairie Junior Hockey League | Regina and Saskatoon region | 2006 | 1 | 13 teams |

=== Junior C Hockey leagues ===
| League | Region | Established | Notes |
|---|---|---|---|
| Saskatchewan Junior C Hockey League | Regina and Saskatoon region | 1996 | 16 teams |

== Semi-professional, senior and amateur ==
=== Western Women's Hockey League ===
The Western Women's Hockey League (WWHL) and the National Women's Hockey League (NWHL) were the top levels of women's hockey in Canada until 2007 with the creation of the Canadian Women's Hockey League. In 2006, an agreement was made that the WWHL would become a division within the NWHL, but would remain an independent league. There was no competition between the winners of the two leagues to determine an overall winner.

| Team | City | Existed | WWHL titles | Notes |
|---|---|---|---|---|
| Saskatchewan Prairie Ice | Lumsden | 2004–07 | 0 | Suspended operations for the 2007–08 WWHL season. |

=== Senior ===
Three senior AAA hockey teams from Saskatchewan have captured the Allan Cup as the national Senior hockey champion of Canada. the Lloydminster Border Kings are the defending Allan Cup champions.

| Team | City | Established | Allan Cups | Notes |
|---|---|---|---|---|
| Lloydminster Border Kings | Lloydminster | unknown–present | 2 | Member of the Chinook Hockey League |
| Regina Rangers | Regina | unknown | 1 | 1941 Allan Cup champions |
| Regina Victorias | Regina | unknown | 1 | 1914 Allan Cup champions |

=== University ===
The Canada West Universities Athletic Association was founded in 1919, representing schools across Western Canada.

| Team | City | Established | Men's conference titles | Women's conference titles | University Cups | Women's titles |
|---|---|---|---|---|---|---|
| U of R Cougars | Regina | 1985 | 0 | 1 | 0 | 0 |
| U of S Huskies | Saskatoon | 1910s | 14 | 0 | 1 | 0 |

=== College ===
The Alberta Colleges Athletics Conference organizes sport at the collegiate level.

| Team | City | Established | ACAC titles | CCAA national titles | ACAC women's titles | Notes |
|---|---|---|---|---|---|---|
| Briercrest College Clippers | Caronport | 1997 | 0 | 0 | N/A | Does not play ACAC women's hockey, only men's |

== League, regional and national championships ==
| Championship | Times won | Description |
|---|---|---|
| WCHL Championship | 1 | Western Canada Hockey League champion |
| Lester Patrick Cup | 1 | Western Hockey League champion |
| Ed Chynoweth Cup | 7^{‡} | Western Hockey League champion |
| Memorial Cup | 6^{‡} | Canadian Major-Junior national champion |
| Allan Cup | 4 | Canadian senior national champion |
| Anavet Cup | 29^{‡} | Saskatchewan/Manitoba Junior "A" regional championship |
| Royal Bank Cup | 9 | Canadian Junior "A" national champion |
| Keystone Cup | 10 | Western Canada Junior "B" champion |
| University Cup | 1 | CIS national university champion |

^{‡}Totals do not include any championships by the Flin Flon Bombers, as the town is predominantly based in Manitoba.

== See also ==
- Hockey Saskatchewan
