= La Ronge Ice Wolves =

Junior ice hockey team

- City: Lac la Ronge 156
- League: SJHL
- Division: UPL
- Founded: 1998
- Home arena: Jonas Roberts Memorial Community Centre
- Colours
- Owner: Northern Lights Hockey Development
- General manager: Bob Beatty
- Head coach: Taylor Harnett
- Website: icewolves.ca

Championships
- League: 2010; 2011

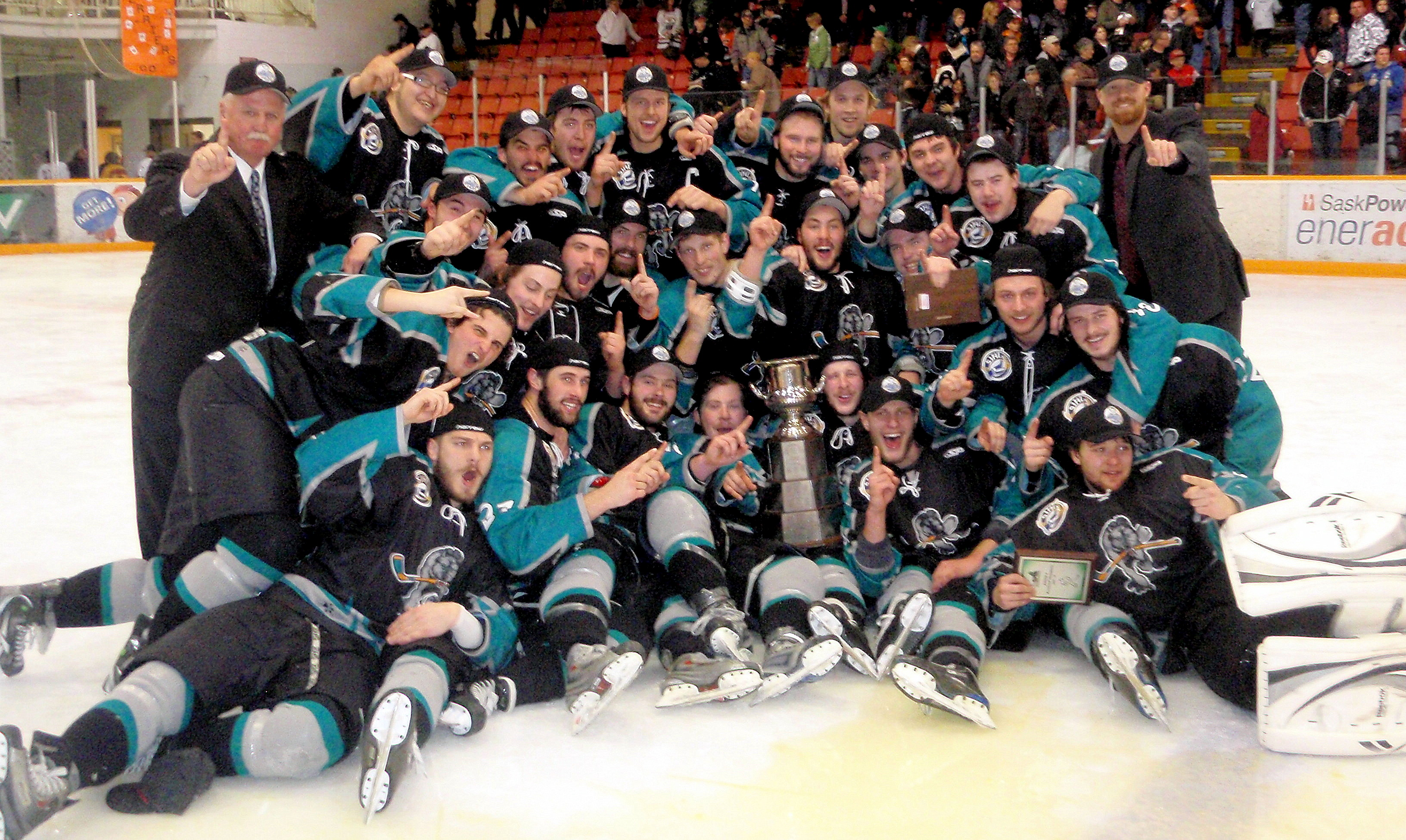
La Ronge Ice Wolves in 2010

The La Ronge Ice Wolves are a junior ice hockey franchise of the Saskatchewan Junior Hockey League (SJHL). The team plays its homes games at the Jonas Roberts Memorial Community Centre of the Lac La Ronge Indian Band. The franchise is owned and operated by the non-profit Northern Lights Development Corporation Inc.

== Arena ==
From 1998–2025, the Ice Wolves played their home games at the Mel Hegland Uniplex in La Ronge.

Since 2025, the club plays its home games at the Jonas Roberts Memorial Community Centre on the Lac la Ronge 156 Indian reserve. The facility received various upgrades, including increasing the seating capacity, construction of a new dressing room and office space, and a new score clock.

== History ==
The La Ronge Ice Wolves was founded in 1998 as an expansion franchise. In 2004, the Town of La Ronge, the Village of Air Ronge, and the Lac La Ronge Indian Band jointly took over ownership of the club to ensure its financial stability and local future.

The Ice Wolves won their first league championship in 2010, despite finishing the regular season in seventh place, after defeating the Humboldt Broncos, Flin Flon Bombers, Battlefords North Stars and Yorkton Terriers in the playoffs. The Ice Wolves then advanced to both the regional and national championships respectively, and were thwarted by the Dauphin Kings of the Manitoba Junior Hockey League at both.

The team won its second league championship the following year, in 2011, after finishing the regular season in first place. After a bye in the first round, they beat the Flin Flon Bombers and Melfort Mustangs in five games each, and the Yorkton Terriers in seven in the final. The Ice Wolves went on to play for the regional championship ANAVET Cup and were eliminated by the Portage Terriers in seven games.

In 2019, Taylor Keast dressed as an emergency back-up goaltender for the Ice Dogs against the Kindersley Klippers and, in so doing, became the first female player in SJHL history.

Season-by-season record
Season	GP	W	L	T	OTL	GF	GA	Pts	Finish	Playoffs
1998–99	66	11	53	2	0	183	371	24	7th in division	Did not qualify
1999–00	60	21	36	3	0	180	225	45	7th in division	Did not qualify
2000–01	62	26	34	1	1	225	301	54	6th in division	Did not qualify
2001–02	64	21	37	3	3	195	280	48	5th in division	Did not qualify
2002–03	60	25	28	6	1	222	235	57	5th in division	Did not qualify
2003–04	60	15	33	7	5	172	250	42	6th in division	Did not qualify
2004–05	55	29	18	5	3	196	183	66	2nd in division	Won quarterfinal against Melfort (4:2); Lost semifinal against Battlefords (4:3)
2005–06	55	28	20	4	3	190	168	63	3rd in division	Won quarterfinal against Nipawin (4:0); Lost semifinal against Battlefords (4:0)
2006–07	58	24	24	0	10	207	218	58	5th in division	Lost first round against Nipawin (4:2)
2007–08	58	29	22	0	7	192	200	65	7th overall	Lost first round against Nipawin (4:2)
2008–09	56	11	42	0	3	146	263	25	12th overall	
2009–10	58	29	21	0	8	209	194	66	7th overall	Won first round against Homboldt (3:0); Won quarterfinal against Flin Flon (4:2); Won semifinal against Battlefords (4:2); Won final against Yorkton (4:2); Lost regional final against Dauphin (4:1); Lost national semifinal against Dauphin (6:2)
2010–11	58	42	14	0	2	262	175	86	1st overall	Won quarterfinal against Flin Flon (4:1); Won semifinal against Melfort (4:1); Won final against Yorkton (3:4); Lost regional final against Portage la Prairie (4:3)
2011–12	58	30	20	0	8	189	178	68	4th in division 6th overall	Won first round against Flin Flon (3:0); Lost quarterfinal against Humboldt (4:0)
2012–13	54	20	31	0	3	147	203	43	6th in division 11th overall	Did not qualify
2013–14	56	20	33	0	3	175	232	43	4th in division 12th overall	Did not qualify
2014–15	56	21	27	3	5	135	197	50	4th in division 11th overall	Did not qualify
2015–16	58	26	24	4	4	166	173	60	4th in division 7th overall	Won first round against Yorkton (3:0); Lost quarterfinal against Melfort (0:4)
2016–17	58	6	47	1	4	103	275	17	4th in division 12th overall	Did not qualify
2017–18	58	10	45	0	3	125	292	23	4th in division 12th overall	Did not qualify
2018–19	58	12	44	1	1	143	270	26	4th in division 12th overall	Did not qualify
2019–20	58	33	19	3	3	211	199	72	3rd in division 5th overall	Tied quarterfinal against Yorkton (2:2); Playoffs cancelled
2020–21	4	2	1	1	0	14	13	5	Season cancelled	
2021–22	58	29	24	1	4	198	223	63	3rd in division 7th overall	Lost quarterfinal against Humboldt (4:2)
2022–23	56	32	19	3	2	201	159	69	3rd in division 5th overall	Lost quarterfinal against Melfort (4:2)
2023–24	56	16	35	3	2	161	242	37	4th in division 11th overall	Did not qualify
2024–25	56	24	27	3	2	185	205	53	3rd in division 9th overall	Did not qualify
2025–26	56	11	40	0	4	140	276	27	4th in division 12th overall	Did not qualify

Source: "La Ronge Ice Wolves hockey team statistics and history". hockeydb.com.

== See also ==
- List of ice hockey teams in Saskatchewan
