= Melville Millionaires =

Junior ice hockey team in Melville, Saskatchewan

- City: Melville, Saskatchewan
- League: SJHL
- Division: Bunge
- Founded: 1908
- Home arena: CN Community Centre
- Colours: Blue, White and Red
- General manager: Doug Johnson
- Head coach: Doug Johnson
- Website: melvillemillionaires.ca

The Melville Millionaires Junior A Hockey Club are a junior ice hockey club and franchise of the Saskatchewan Junior Hockey League (SJHL). The team plays its home games at the CN Community Centre in Melville, Saskatchewan. The team colours are blue and white. Games are broadcast on radio station CJGX AM 940. The Millionaires also fielded a senior hockey team in the 1910s, which won the 1915 Allan Cup.

== History ==
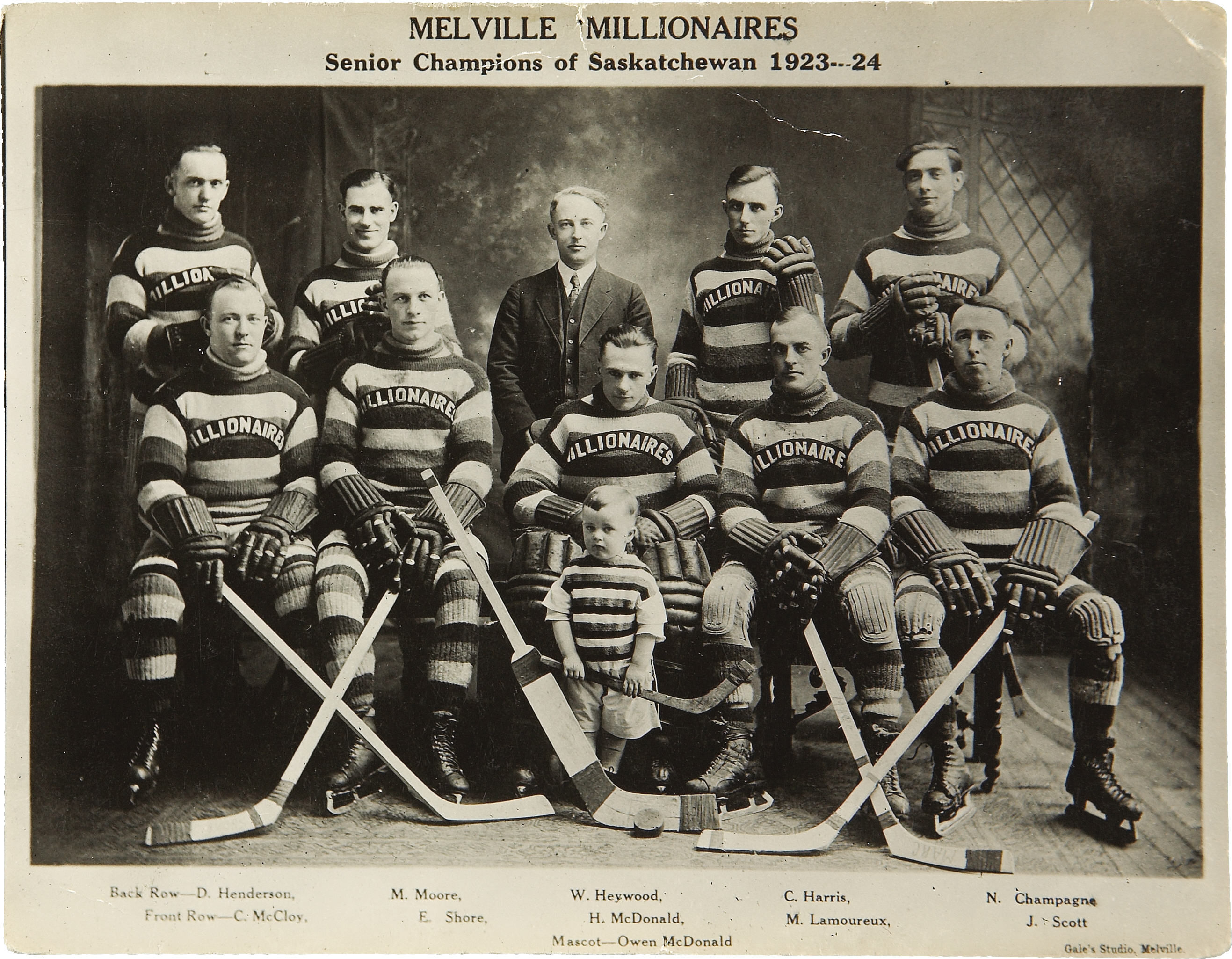
Melville Millionaires, Senior Champions of Saskatchewan, 1923–24.

An earlier version of the Melville Millionaires played senior hockey during the 1910s in the Southern Saskatchewan Hockey League, winning the league championship in 1915 and taking over the title of Allan Cup champions. The team subsequently won two challenges but lost the final challenge of the season to the Winnipeg Monarchs.

A popular story on why the team was named the "Millionaires" comes from a rumour that Charles Melville Hayes, Melville's namesake who perished in the 1912 sinking of the Titanic, was aboard the ship with a group of millionaires who were potential investors in Melville. But the true origin has more to do with the players on the team assembled to win the Allan Cup by local hockey pioneer and postmaster Goldie Smith, with several critics of the time reportedly grumbling that Melville would need to be a town of millionaires to attract the level of talent they did. Smith liked the name, and it stuck.

Smith is credited with discovering Eddie Shore, who was part of a Millionaires team that won the 1923-24 Saskatchewan senior championship. About ten years later, Smith was working for the Detroit Red Wings when he spotted the talent of another hockey legend, Sid Abel.

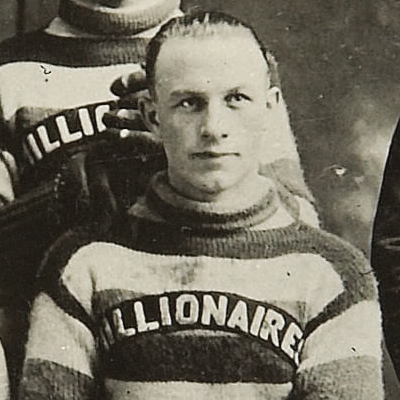
Eddie Shore with the Melville Millionaires.

The team's original arena, Melville Stadium, was damaged in a fire in 1949 and burned down completely in 1962. A new arena was subsequently built, but only stood for two years before it too was destroyed in a fire.

=== Saskatchewan Junior Hockey League ===
The modern version of the team joined the SJHL in 1970.

Future National Hockey League all-star Ron Hextall was a member of the Millionaires during the 1980–81 season. On February 27, 1981, Hextall faced 105 shots against the five-time league champion Prince Albert Raiders in a 21–2 loss. The game reporter said "Hextall was Brilliant..." through his 84-save effort, claiming the "score could have gone up to 34 or 35."

The club's home arena opened in 2011.

Statistics
Season	GP	W	L	T	OTL	GF	GA	Pts	Regular season	Post-season
1970-71	36	22	13	1	-	237	190	45	3rd SJHL	
1971-72	44	32	12	0	-	242	140	51	2nd SJHL	
1972-73	48	23	25	0	-	231	223	46	6th SJHL	
1973-74	50	21	29	0	-	203	231	42	5th SJHL North	
1974-75	58	34	21	3	-	300	258	71	2nd SJHL North	
1975-76	58	42	15	1	-	393	267	85	1st SJHL South	
1976-77	60	37	22	1	-	343	236	75	3rd SJHL South	
1977-78	60	21	39	0	-	230	329	42	5th SJHL South	
1978-79	60	35	23	2	-	286	291	72	1st SJHL South	
1979-80	60	29	30	1	-	296	322	59	4th SJHL South	Lost 1st round
1980-81	60	11	49	0	-	208	456	22	6th SJHL South	
1981-82	60	23	35	2	-	274	329	48	4th SJHL South	Lost quarter-final
1982-83	64	30	31	3	-	330	355	63	4th SJHL	Lost quarter-final
1983-84	64	38	26	0	-	345	315	76	3rd SJHL	Lost quarter-final
1984-85	64	27	34	3	-	315	326	57	6th SJHL	Lost 1st round
1985-86	60	24	33	3	-	246	292	51	6th SJHL	
1986-87	64	24	40	0	-	241	302	48	8th SJHL	Lost 1st round
1987-88	60	26	27	7	-	281	283	59	6th SJHL	
1988-89	64	29	33	2	-	310	322	60	5th SJHL South	
1989-90	68	31	33	4	-	259	274	66	4th SJHL South	Lost 1st round
1990-91	68	40	21	7	-	245	221	87	2nd SJHL South	Lost quarter-final
1991-92	64	38	23	3	-	261	221	79	3rd SJHL South	Lost semi-final
1992-93	64	43	12	9	-	285	188	95	1st SJHL	Lost final
1993-94	68	39	24	5	-	325	288	83	2nd SJHL South	Lost semi-final
1994-95	64	28	34	2	-	280	318	58	5th SJHL South	Lost 1st round
1995-96	64	11	48	5	-	168	305	27	7th SJHL South	Did not qualify
1996-97	64	15	43	6	-	211	320	36	7th SJHL South	Did not qualify
1997-98	64	25	35	4	-	258	301	54	5th SJHL South	Lost 1st round
1998-99	66	34	30	2	-	271	239	70	5th SJHL South	Lost quarter-final
1999-00	60	44	13	3	-	255	180	91	1st SJHL South	Lost semi-final
2000-01	62	39	20	3	0	248	204	81	2nd SJHL Sherwood	Lost quarter-final
2001-02	64	22	34	5	3	197	250	52	5th SJHL Sherwood	Did not qualify
2002-03	60	23	26	7	4	237	219	57	4th SJHL Sherwood	Lost final
2003-04	60	37	18	3	2	282	191	79	1st SJHL Sherwood	Lost quarter-final
2004-05	55	18	31	5	1	152	204	42	6th SJHL Sherwood	Did not qualify
2005-06	55	29	20	3	3	182	165	64	3rd SJHL Sherwood	Lost quarter-final
2006-07	58	28	19	0	11	178	178	67	2nd SJHL Sherwood	Lost final
2007-08	58	34	22	-	2	205	159	70	4th SJHL	Lost semi-final
2008-09	56	37	16	-	3	201	142	77	3rd overall	Won quarterfinal against Yorkton (4:3); Won semifinal against Weyburn (4:2); Lost final against Humboldt (4:1)
2009–10	58	29	26	-	3	204	190	61	8th overall	Lost first round against Yorkton (3:1)
2010–11	58	24	30	-	4	185	230	52	10th overall	Lost first round against Estevan (3:2)
2011–12	58	29	21	-	8	213	196	66	3rd in division 7th overall	Won quarterfinal against Yorkton (4:1); Lost semifinal against Weyburn (4:3)
2012–13	54	35	14	2	3	203	141	75	2nd in division 3rd overall	Won quarterfinal against Notre Dame (4:3); Lost semifinal against Yorkton (4:2)
2013–14	56	34	16	4	2	181	158	74	2nd in division 4th overall	Won quarterfinal against Kindersley (4:0); Won semifinal against Battlefords (4:0); Lost final against Yorkton (4:0)
2014–15	56	26	26	2	2	142	145	56	1st in division 7th overall	Lost quarterfinal against Nipawin (4:2)
2015–16	58	16	39	1	2	147	231	35	4th in division 12th overall	Did not qualify
2016–17	58	22	33	3	0	133	186	47	4th in division 11th overall	Did not qualify
2017–18	58	23	31	2	2	155	188	50	3rd in division 10th overall	Lost first round against Weyburn (2:1)
2018–19	58	16	32	-	6	150	224	42	4th in division 11th overall	Did not qualify
2019–20	58	16	36	-	2	140	220	38	4th in division 12th overall	Did not qualify
2020–21	6	4	2	-	0	24	19	8	Season cancelled	
2021–22	57	17	30	-	9	146	222	44	3rd in division 10th overall	Did not qualify
2022–23	56	14	36	-	5	152	247	34	4th in division 12th overall	Did not qualify
2023–24	56	32	23	-	2	183	179	65	1st in division 5th overall	Lost quarterfinal against Battlefords (4:0)
2024–25	56	31	22	2	1	172	149	65	3rd in division 5th overall	Lost quarterfinal against Yorkton (4:1)
2025–26	56	25	21	0	5	171	181	60	3rd in division 7th overall	Lost quarterfinal against Yorkton (4:2)

Source: "Melville Millionaires statistics and history". hockeydb.com.

=== Playoffs ===
- 1971 Lost semi-final

Weyburn Red Wings defeated Melville Millionaires 4-games-to-2

- 1972 Lost final

Melville Millionaires defeated Regina Blues 4-games-to-none
Melville Millionaires defeated Prince Albert Raiders 4-games-to-2
Humboldt Broncos defeated Melville Millionaires 4-games-to-1

- 1973 Lost quarter-final

Humboldt Broncos defeated Melville Millionaires 4-games-to-2

- 1974 Did not qualify
- 1975 Lost quarter-final

Battleford Barons defeated Melville Millionaires 4-games-to-2

- 1976 Lost semi-final

Melville Millionaires defeated Estevan Bruins 4-games-to-3
Weyburn Red Wings defeated Melville Millionaires 4-games-to-2

- 1977 Lost final

Melville Millionaires defeated Moose Jaw Canucks 4-games-to-2
Melville Millionaires defeated Weyburn Red Wings 4-games-to-1
Prince Albert Raiders defeated Melville Millionaires 4-games-to-2

- 1978 Did not qualify
- 1979 Lost semi-final

Melville Millionaires defeated Weyburn Red Wings 4-games-to-3
Moose Jaw Canucks defeated Melville Millionaires 4-games-to-none

- 1980 Lost quarter-final

Moose Jaw Canucks defeated Melville Millionaires 4-games-to-1

- 1981 Did not qualify
- 1982 Lost quarter-final

Yorkton Terriers defeated Melville Millionaires 4-games-to-none

- 1983 Lost semi-final

Melville Millionaires defeated Swift Current Broncos 4-games-to-none
Yorkton Terriers defeated Melville Millionaires 4-games-to-1

- 1984 Lost semi-final

Melville Millionaires defeated Estevan Bruins 4-games-to-1
Weyburn Red Wings defeated Melville Millionaires 4-games-to-3

- 1985 Lost quarter-final

Battlefords North Stars defeated Melville Millionaires 4-games-to-3

- 1986 Lost quarter-final

Estevan Bruins defeated Melville Millionaires 4-games-to-none

- 1987 Lost quarter-final

Humboldt Broncos defeated Melville Millionaires 4-games-to-1

- 1988 Lost quarter-final

Yorkton Terriers defeated Melville Millionaires 4-games-to-1

- 1989 Did not qualify
- 1990 Lost quarter-final

Humboldt Broncos defeated Melville Millionaires 4-games-to-1

- 1991 Lost quarter-final

Weyburn Red Wings defeated Melville Millionaires 4-games-to-3

- 1992 Lost semi-final

Melville Millionaires defeated Weyburn Red Wings 4-games-to-2
Estevan Bruins defeated Melville Millionaires 4-games-to-1

- 1993 Lost final

Melville Millionaires defeated Weyburn Red Wings 4-games-to-none
Melville Millionaires defeated Estevan Bruins 4-games-to-1
Flin Flon Bombers defeated Melville Millionaires 4-games-to-3

- 1994 Lost semi-final

Melville Millionaires defeated Yorkton Terriers 4-games-to-none
Weyburn Red Wings defeated Melville Millionaires 4-games-to-2

- 1995 Lost Preliminary

Estevan Bruins defeated Melville Millionaires 2-games-to-none

- 1996 Did not qualify
- 1997 Did not qualify
- 1998 Lost Preliminary

Notre Dame Hounds defeated Melville Millionaires 2-games-to-1

- 1999 Lost quarter-final

Melville Millionaires defeated Lebret Eagles 2-games-to-none
Estevan Bruins defeated Melville Millionaires 4-games-to-none

- 2000 Lost semi-final

Second in round robin (3-1) vs. Notre Dame Hounds and La Ronge Ice Wolves
Melville Millionaires defeated Estevan Bruins 4-games-to-1
Weyburn Red Wings defeated Melville Millionaires 4-games-to-2

- 2001 Lost quarter-final

Lebret Eagles defeated Melville Millionaires 4-games-to-2

- 2002 Did not qualify
- 2003 Lost final

Melville Millionaires defeated Notre Dame Hounds 4-games-to-2
Melville Millionaires defeated Yorkton Terriers 4-games-to-2
Humboldt Broncos defeated Melville Millionaires 4-games-to-none

- 2004 Lost quarter-final

Yorkton Terriers defeated Melville Millionaires 4-games-to-2

- 2005 Did not qualify
- 2006 Lost quarter-final

Third in round robin (1-2-1) vs. Notre Dame Hounds and Yorkton Terriers
Notre Dame Hounds defeated Melville Millionaires 4-games-to-none

- 2007 Lost final

First in round robin (3-0-1) vs. Estevan Bruins and Yorkton Terriers
Melville Millionaires defeated Weyburn Red Wings 4-games-to-2
Melville Millionaires defeated Yorkton Terriers 4-games-to-3
Humboldt Broncos defeated Melville Millionaires 4-games-to-1

- 2008 Lost semi-final

First in round robin (2-0-1) vs. Kindersley Klippers and Weyburn Red Wings
Melville Millionaires defeated Yorkton Terriers 4-games-to-none
Kindersley Klippers defeated Melville Millionaires 4-games-to-2

- 2009 Lost final

Melville Millionaires defeated Yorkton Terriers 4-games-to-3
Melville Millionaires defeated Weyburn Red Wings 4-games-to-2
Humboldt Broncos defeated Melville Millionaires 4-games-to-1

- 2010 Lost Preliminary

Yorkton Terriers defeated Melville Millionaires 3-games-to-1

- 2011 Lost Preliminary

Estevan Bruins defeated Melville Millionaires 3-games-to-2

- 2012 Lost semi-final

Quarter-finals Melville Millionaires defeated Yorkton Terriers 4-games-to-1
Semi-finals Weyburn Red Wings defeated Melville Millionaires 4-games-to-3

- 2013 Lost semi-final

Quarter-finals Melville Millionaires defeated Notre Dame Hounds 4-games-to-3
Semi-finals Yorkton Terriers defeated Melville Millionaires 4-games-to-2

- 2014 Lost finals

Quarter-finals Melville Millionaires defeated Kindersley Klippers 4-games-to-none
Semi-finals Melville Millionaires defeated Battlefords North Stars 4-games-to-1
Finals Yorkton Terriers defeated Melville Millionaires 4-games-to-none

== Notable alumni ==
List of National Hockey League or World Hockey Association alumni:

- Wade Brookbank
- Tim Cheveldae
- Brett Clark
- Wilf Cude
- Mike Eagles
- John Ferguson Sr.
- Bill Flett
- Ted Hargreaves
- Shaun Heshka
- Ron Hextall
- Jim Hiller
- Chris Kunitz
- Brian Propp
- Eddie Shore
- Richard Zemlak

== See also ==
- List of ice hockey teams in Saskatchewan
