= 2019–20 SJHL season =

52nd season of the Saskatchewan Junior Hockey League

- League: SJHL
- Sport: Ice hockey

Regular season
- Season champions: Battlefords North Stars
- Finals champions: Playoffs cancelled

List of SJHL seasons
- ← 2018–19 2020–21 →

The 2019–20 SJHL season was the 52nd season of the Saskatchewan Junior Hockey League. The Battlefords North Stars finished the regular season in first place overall. Seven teams were still in contention for the Canalta Cup when the post-season was cancelled due to public health restrictions related to the COVID-19 pandemic.

== Regular season standings ==
Teams map, 2019–20 SJHL season
Global Ag Risk Solutions Division
Sherwood Division
Viterra Division

Viterra Division
Team	GP	W	L	OTL	SOL	Pts
xy-Yorkton Terriers	58	35	20	2	1	73
x-Estevan Bruins	58	31	20	3	1	66
Weyburn Red Wings	58	20	35	1	2	43
Melville Millionaires	58	16	36	2	4	38

Nutrien Division
Team	GP	W	L	OTL	SOL	Pts
xy-Flin Flon Bombers	58	36	15	7	0	79
x-Melfort Mustangs	58	32	17	6	3	73
x-La Ronge Ice Wolves	58	33	19	3	3	72
x-Nipawin Hawks	58	30	24	3	1	64

Global Ag Risk Solutions Division
Team	GP	W	L	OTL	SOL	Pts
xy-Battlefords North Stars	58	45	11	2	0	92
x-Humboldt Broncos	58	28	21	7	2	65
Kindersley Klippers	58	24	27	6	1	55
Notre Dame Hounds	58	18	32	5	3	44

- x = Clinched playoff position
- y = Clinched division

== Playoffs ==
Playoffs cancelled during the first round due to COVID-19 pandemic.

Quarterfinals
1	Battlefords	3
8	Nipawin	1
2	Flin Flon	4
7	Humboldt	0
3	Melfort	3
6	Estevan	1
4	Yorkton	2
5	La Ronge	2

Semifinals
2	Flin Flon	-

Final
