= 2018–19 SJHL season =

Saskatchewan Junior Hockey League season

- League: Saskatchewan Junior Hockey League
- Sport: Ice hockey

Regular Season
- Season champions: Nipawin Hawks
- Finals champions: Battlefords North Stars

List of SJHL seasons
- ← 2017–18 2019–20 →

The 2018–19 Saskatchewan Junior Hockey League was the league's 51st Season. The Battlefords North Stars won the league championship and were the runners up for the regional championship ANAVET Cup. In January, Taylor Keast dressed as an emergency back-up goaltender for the Ice Dogs against the Kindersley Klippers and, in so doing, became the first female player in SJHL history.

== Regular season ==
Sherwood Division	GP	W	L	OTL	SOL	Pts
Nipawin Hawks (Note: Advanced to second round of the playoffs)	58	38	15	2	3	81
Melfort Mustangs (Note: Advanced to playoffs)	58	37	17	4	0	78
Flin Flon Bombers	58	34	20	1	3	72
La Ronge Ice Wolves (Note: Eliminated from playoffs)	58	12	44	1	1	26

Global Ag Risk Solutions Division	GP	W	L	OTL	SOL	Pts
Battlefords North Stars	58	35	13	5	5	80
Kindersley Klippers	58	36	16	4	2	78
Humboldt Broncos	58	35	19	3	1	74
Notre Dame Hounds	58	25	23	5	5	60

Viterra Division	GP	W	L	OTL	SOL	Pts
Estevan Bruins	58	31	22	3	2	67
Yorkton Terriers	58	31	26	1	0	63
Weyburn Red Wings	58	18	34	5	1	42
Melville Millionaires	58	16	32	6	4	42

Source: "2018–19 SJHL standings". hockeydb.com.

== Playoffs ==
Round 1
8	Yorkton	2
9	Notre Dame	1
7	Flin Flon	2
10	Weyburn	0

Round 2
1	Nipawin	3
8	Yorkton	4
4	Melfort	4
5	Kindersley	1
2	Battlefords	4
7	Flin Flon	3
3	Estevan	4
6	Humboldt	3

Round 3
2	Battlefords	4
8	Yorkton	0
3	Estevan	2
4	Melford	4

Round 4
2	Battlefords	4
4	Melford	1

== ANAVET Cup ==
League Finals
2	Battlefords	4
4	Melford	1
SJHL; MJHL
1	Portage	4
2	Swan Valley	3

Avanet Cup
S2	Battlefords	1
M1	Portage	4
