= Melfort Mustangs =

- City: Melfort, Saskatchewan
- League: SJHL
- Division: North
- Founded: 1988
- Home arena: Northern Lights Palace
- Colours: Blue & green
- Head coach: Trevor Blevins
- Website: melfortmustangs.com

The Melfort Mustangs are a junior "A" ice hockey team based in Melfort, Saskatchewan, Canada. They are members of the Saskatchewan Junior Hockey League (SJHL). They play their home games at the Northern Lights Palace, which has a seating capacity of 1,850. The team colors are blue, green, and white.

The Mustangs joined the SJHL for the 1988–89 season. They won SJHL championships in 1992, 1996, 2015, 2016, 2024 and 2025. Advance to the National Jr. "A" Championships in 1996, 2015, 2024 and 2025.

== Season-by-season ==
Season	GP	W	L	T	OTL	GF	GA	P	Results	Playoffs
1988-89	64	9	52	3	-	193	423	21	5th SJHL North	Did not qualify
1989-90	68	21	43	4	-	234	327	46	5th SJHL North	Did not qualify
1990-91	68	31	34	3	-	298	312	65	4th SJHL North	Lost quarter-final
1991-92	64	41	21	2	-	228	212	84	1st SJHL North	Won League
1992-93	64	35	22	7	-	219	207	77	1st SJHL North	Lost quarter-final
1993-94	68	39	23	6	-	267	203	84	1st SJHL North	Lost final
1994-95	64	33	24	7	-	267	237	73	3rd SJHL North	Lost semi-final
1995-96	64	44	14	6	-	296	168	94	1st SJHL North	Won League, won Anavet Cup
1996-97	64	38	21	5	-	237	192	81	2nd SJHL North	Lost quarter-final
1997-98	64	36	22	6	-	261	218	78	2nd SJHL North	Lost quarter-final
1998-99	66	45	18	3	-	312	229	93	1st SJHL North	Lost semi-final
1999-00	60	32	20	8	-	232	208	72	3rd SJHL North	Lost 1st round
2000-01	62	28	27	2	5	199	224	63	5th SJHL Dodge	Did not qualify
2001-02	64	39	20	3	2	241	170	83	3rd SJHL Dodge	Lost semi-final
2002-03	60	31	22	5	2	246	226	69	4th SJHL Dodge	Lost quarter-final
2003-04	60	11	38	8	3	143	263	33	7th SJHL Dodge	Did not qualify
2004-05	55	18	31	2	4	156	211	42	5th SJHL Itech	Lost quarter-final
2005-06	55	30	24	0	1	203	191	61	4th SJHL Itech	Lost 1st round
2006-07	58	37	18	0	3	207	150	77	3rd SJHL Itech	
2007-08	58	37	17	-	4	190	144	78	3rd SJHL	
2008-09	56	27	26	-	3	159	177	57	7th SJHL	
2009-10	58	30	21	-	7	199	189	67	6th SJHL	Lost quarter-final
2010-11	58	32	18	-	8	211	169	72	4th SJHL	Lost semi-final
2011-12	58	13	39	-	6	120	236	32	6th Bauer Div; 11th SJHL	Did not qualify
2012-13	54	19	29	-	6	142	186	44	6th Bauer Div; 10th SJHL	Won Play In Rd, 3-0 (North Stars); Lost quarter-final 1-4 (Broncos)
2013-14	56	26	23	-	7	142	186	59	1st Sherwood Div; 7th SJHL	Lost quarter-final 1-4 (Broncos)
2014-15	56	39	8	3	6	201	114	87	1st of 4 Sherwood Div; 1st of 12 SJHL	Won quarter-final, 4-1 (Red Wings); Won semi-final, 4-1 (Hawks); Won League Finals, 4-0 (Hounds); SJHL CHampions
2015-16	58	39	14	3	2	227	173	83	1st of 4 Sherwood Div; 2nd of 12 SJHL	Won quarter-final, 4-0 (Ice Wolves); Won semi-finals 4-3, (Hawks); Won League Finals 4-2, (Bombers); SJHL CHampions
2016-17	58	21	30	3	4	174	216	49	3rd of 4 Sherwood Div; 10th of 12 SJHL	Lost Wildcard, 1-3 (Hounds)
2017-18	58	39	13	4	2	227	157	84	2nd of 4 Sherwood Div; 3rd of 12 SJHL	Lost quarter-final, 1-4 (Broncos)
2018-19	58	37	17	4	0	235	179	78	2nd of 4 Sherwood Div; 3rd of 12 SJHL	Won quarter-final, 4-1 (Klippers); Won Semifinals 4-2 (Bruins); Lost Finals 1-4 (North Stars)
2019-20	58	32	17	6	3	182	152	73	2nd of 4 Sherwood Div; 4th of 12 SJHL	Lead quarter-final, 3-1 (Bruins) remaining playoffs cancelled due to COVID-19
2020–21	5	2	3	0	0	15	12	4	SJHL season cancelled due to COVID-19 pandemic	
2021-22	58	34	15	4	5	207	165	77	1st of 4 Sherwood Div; 3rd of 12 SJHL	Lost quarter-final, 3-4 (Terriers)
2022-23	56	31	16	5	4	206	161	71	2nd of 4 Sherwood Div; 4th of 12 SJHL	Won quarter-final, 4-2 (Ice Wolves); Lost Semifinals 0-4 (North Stars)
2023-24	56	38	14	3	1	218	158	80	2nd of 4 Sherwood Div; 1st of 12 SJHL	Won quarter-final, 4-1 (Bruins); Won Semifinals 4-3 (Broncos); Won League Finals 4-2 (Bombers); SJHL Champions; Advance to Centennial Cup (see below)
2024–25	56	46	8	0	2	221	123	94	1st of 4 Sherwood Div; 1st of 12 SJHL	Won quarter-final, 4-1 (Klippers); Won Semifinals 4-0 (Terriers); Won League Finals 4-1 (Red Wings); SJHL Champions; Advance to Centennial Cup

== Western Canada Cup ==
Western Canada Championships ** BCHL - AJHL- SJHL - MJHL - Host **
Round robin play with 1st vs 2nd - winner advance to National Championship & loser to Runner-up Game
3rd vs 4th in 2nd semi-final winner to Runner-up game loser eliminated.
Runner-up game determines 2nd representative to National Championship.
Competition began 2013 season.

Year	Round Robin	Record	Standing	Semifinal	Gold Medal Game	Runner-up Game
2015	L, Portage Terriers 3-6; W, Spruce Grove Saints 4-3; L, Penticton Vees 1-3; L, Ft McMurray OilBarons 2-3	1-3-0	4th of 5	W, Ft McMurray OilBarons 3-2	n/a	L, Portage Terriers 2-4
2016	L, Portage Terriers 1-2; L, Brooks Bandits 0-3; W, Estevan Bruins 2-1; L, W. Kelowna Warriors 1-4	1-3-0	4th of 5	OTL, Portage Terriers 2-3	n/a	n/a

== National championships ==
(Dudley Hewitt Champion - Central Zone) & (Fred Page Champion - Eastern Zone) & (Western Canada Cup - Western Zone) & (Western Canada Cup - Runner-up) & (Host)
Round robin play with top 4 in semi-final and winners to finals.

=== Format ===
Canadian Jr. A National Championships
Maritime Junior Hockey League, Quebec Junior Hockey League, Central Canada Hockey League, Ontario Junior Hockey League, Northern Ontario Junior Hockey League, Superior International Junior Hockey League, Manitoba Junior Hockey League, Saskatchewan Junior Hockey League, Alberta Junior Hockey League, and Host. The BCHL declared itself an independent league and there is no BC representative.
Round-robin play in two 5-team pools with top three in pool advancing to determine a Champion.

1996
Round robin	Record	Standing	Semifinal	Final
W, Yorkton Terriers 7-1; W, Moncton Beavers 5-0; W Vernon Vipers 5-1; W, Newmarket 83's 11-3	4-0-0	1st of 5	Won, 7-1; Yorkton Terriers	Lost, 0-2; Vernon Vipers; Runner-up

2015
Round Robin	Record	Standing	Semifinal
L, Penticton Vees 0-4; W, Soo Thunderbirds 5-3; OTW Carleton Place Canadians 4-3; L, Portage Terriers 2-3	2-2-0	4th of 5	Lost, 1-6; Portage Terriers

2024
Round-robin	Record	Standing	Semifinal	Final
W, Miramichi Timberwolves (MarJHL), 4-1; SOW, Winkler Flyers (ManJHL), 6-5; W, Sioux Lookout Bombers (SIJHL), 5-3; W, Oakville Blades (Host), 3-1	3-1-0-0	1st of 5 Group B	Won 2-1; Calgary Canucks	Lost 0-1; Collingwood Blues

2025
Round-robin	Record	Standing	Quarterfinal	Semifinal	Final
L, Calgary Canucks (Host), 1*3; W, Edmundston Blizzard (MarJHL), 5-3; W, Rockland Nationals (CCHL), 5-2; OTW, Valleyfield Braves (QJHL), 5-4	2-1-1-0	2nd of 5 Group B	Won, 7-1; Greater Sudbury Cubs (NOJHL)	Won, 4-3; Trenton Golden Hawks (OJHL)	Lost, 2-7; Calgary Canucks (Host-AJHL)

-* Lost Runner-up game at Western Canada Cup to Portage. Portage is host so Melfort still advances to RBC as runner up representative

== Retired numbers ==
Melfort Mustangs retired numbers
No.	Player	Position	Career	No. retirement
27	Dylan Ashe	D	2018–2020	November 6, 2020
11	Jaxon Joseph	F	2016–2018	September 15, 2018

== NHL alumni ==
- Parris Duffus - Phoenix Coyotes
- Michel Larocque - Chicago Blackhawks
- Scott Fankhouser - Atlanta Thrashers
- Willie Mitchell - Los Angeles Kings
- Ruslan Fedotenko - New York Rangers
- Marc Habscheid - Edmonton Oilers
- Derek Boogaard - Minnesota Wild

== See also ==
- List of ice hockey teams in Saskatchewan
