= Battlefords North Stars =

Junior ice hockey club

- City: North Battleford, Saskatchewan
- League: SJHL
- Division: Nutrien
- Founded: 1973
- Home arena: North Battleford Civic Centre
- Colours: Black; Silver
- General manager: Connor Logan
- Head coach: Connor Logan
- Website: northstars.ca

Franchise history
- 1973–1983: Battlefords Barons
- 1983–2000: North Battleford North Stars
- Since 2000: Battlefords North Stars

Championships
- League: 2000; 2017; 2019; 2023
- Regional: 2000

The Battlefords North Stars are a junior ice hockey club and franchise of the Saskatchewan Junior Hockey League (SJHL). The team plays its home games at the North Battleford Civic Centre in North Battleford, Saskatchewan.

== History ==
The club was founded in 1973 as the Battlefords Barons. It was rebranded as the North Battleford North Stars in 1983, and then as the Battlefords North Stars in 2000.

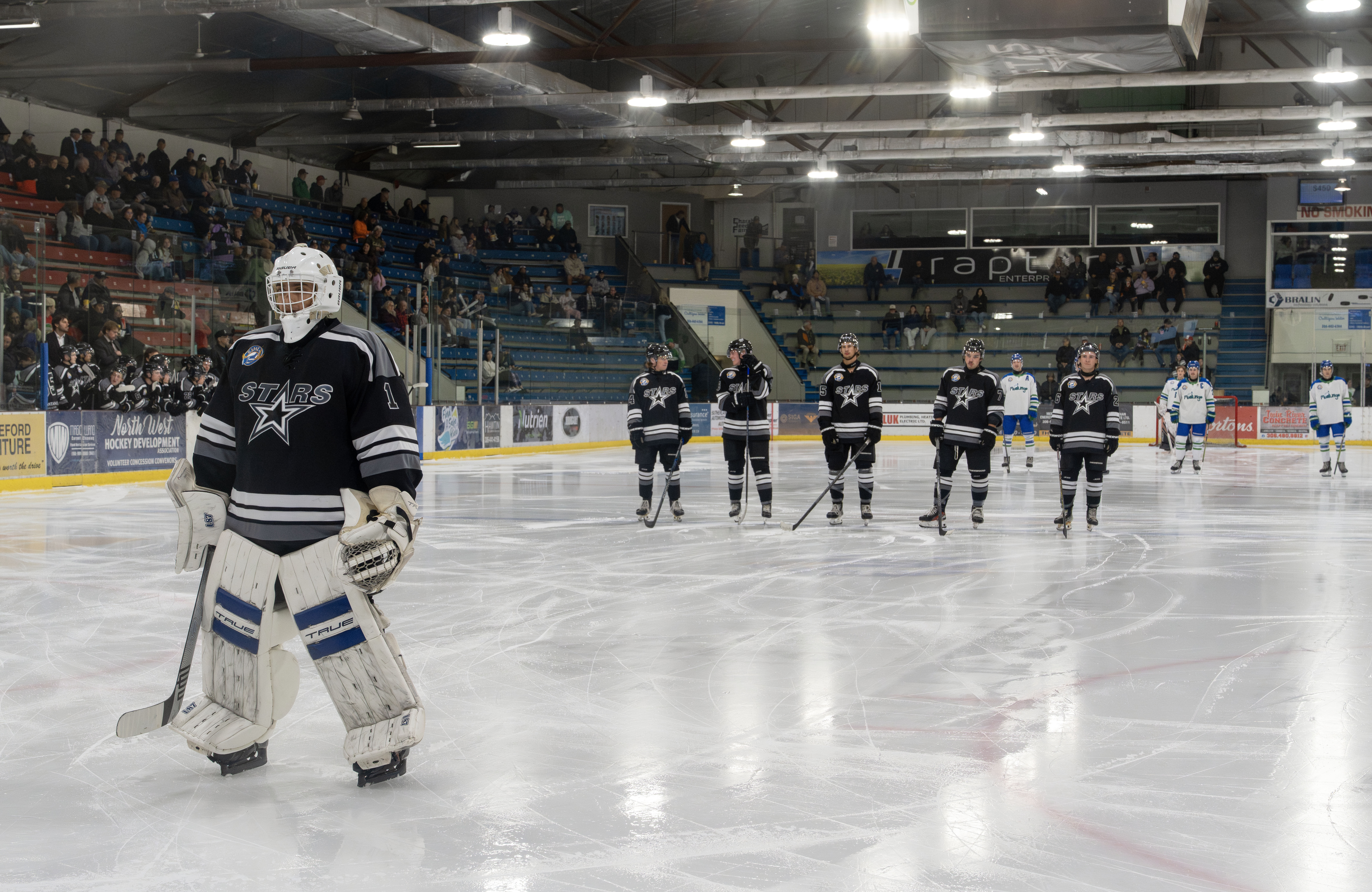
North Stars players in 2025

The North Stars won league championships in 2000, 2017, 2019 and 2023, and a regional ANAVET Cup championship in 2000. most recently in 2023.

The championship 1999–00 North Stars went on to win the regional championship ANAVET Cup, defeating the Manitoba Junior Hockey League championship OCN Blizzard in a best-of-seven series. The North Stars went on to finish in fourth place at the national championship 2000 Royal Bank Cup.

The 2022–23 North Stars reached the final playoff round of the 2023 Centennial Cup national championship before ultimately losing to the Brooks Bandits of the Alberta Junior Hockey League.

Statistics
Season	GP	W	L	T	OTL	GF	GA	Pts	Regular season	Post-season
1973–74	50	10	40	0	-	178	296	20	6th in division	Did not qualify
1974–75	58	31	26	1	-	330	279	63	3rd in division	Won quarterfinal against Melville (4:2); Lost semifinal against Prince Albert (4:0)
1975–76	58	31	27	0	-	343	258	62	4th in division	Lost quarterfinal against Prince Albert (4:0)
1976–77	60	24	34	2	-	292	319	50	3rd in division	Lost quarterfinal against Swift Current (4:1)
1977–78	60	24	36	0	-	254	318	48	4th in division	Lost quarterfinal against Prince Albert (4:0)
1978–79	60	25	33	2	-	310	334	52	4th in division	Lost quarterfinal against Prince Albert (4:1)
1979–80	60	29	31	0	-	288	295	58	3rd in division	Lost quarterfinal against Swift Current (4:1)
1980–81	60	25	34	1	-	283	326	51	4th in division	Lost quarterfinal against Prince Albert (4:0)
1981–82	60	21	37	2	-	250	334	44	5th in division	Did not qualify
1982–83	64	14	50	0	-	266	388	28	9th overall	Did not qualify
1983–84	64	24	38	2	-	278	358	50	7th overall	Lost quarterfinal against Weyburn (4:0)
1984–85	64	39	23	2	-	376	274	80	3rd overall	Won quarterfinal against Melville (4:1); Lost semifinal against Estevan (4:1)
1985–86	60	33	27	0	-	314	307	66	4th overall	Lost quarterfinal against Swift Current (4:0)
1986–87	64	38	23	3	-	310	257	79	3rd overall	Won quarterfinal against Weyburn (4:2); Lost semifinal against Lloydminster (4:0)
1987–88	60	19	38	3	-	246	328	41	10th overall	Did not qualify
1988–89	64	25	36	3	-	308	348	53	4th in division	Lost quarterfinal against Nipawin (4:2)
1989–90	68	36	27	5	-	296	284	77	3rd in division	Lost quarterfinal against Yorkton (4:1)
1990–91	68	35	30	3	-	315	316	73	3rd in division	Lost quarterfinal against Humboldt (4:2)
1991–92	64	20	41	3	-	260	325	43	6th in division	Did not qualify
1992–93	64	16	39	9	-	213	280	41	6th in division	Did not qualify
1993–94	68	35	22	11	-	294	236	81	2nd in division	Lost quarterfinal against Humboldt (4:3)
1994–95	64	39	17	8	-	291	188	86	1st overall	Won quarterfinal against Kindersley (4:0); Won semifinal against Melfort (4:2); Lost final against Weyburn (4:1)
1995–96	64	44	17	3	-	298	201	91	2nd in division	Won quarterfinal against Nipawin (4:2); Lost semifinal against Melfort (4:1)
1996–97	64	30	22	12	-	280	232	72	3rd in division	Won quarterfinal against Melfort (4:0); Won semifinal against Nipawin (4:2); Lost final against Weyburn (4:0)
1997–98	64	26	30	8	-	230	235	60	5th in division	Lost quarterfinal against Nipawin (4:0)
1998–99	66	35	29	2	-	249	227	72	4th in division	Lost quarterfinal against Melfort (4:2)
1999–00	60	39	18	3	-	257	190	81	2nd in division	Won quarterfinal against Kindersley (4:1); Won semifinal against Humboldt (4:3); Won final against Weyburn (4:3)
2000–01	62	24	33	3	2	226	259	53	7th in division	Did not qualify
2001–02	64	37	21	5	1	259	206	80	4th in division	Lost quarterfinal against Kindersley (4:3)
2002–03	60	34	20	4	2	222	183	74	3rd in division	Won quarterfinal against Kindersley (4:0); Lost semifinal against Humboldt (4:2)
2003–04	60	36	16	5	3	219	162	80	2nd in division	Lost quarterfinal against Kindersley (4:0)
2004–05	55	28	15	8	4	202	169	68	1st in division	Won quarterfinal against Kindersley (4:0); Won semifinal against La Ronge (4:3); Lost final against Yorkton (4:3)
2005–06	55	38	12	2	3	215	136	81	1st in division	Won quarterfinal against Flin Flon (4:1); Won semifinal against La Ronge (4:0); Lost final against Yorkton (4:1)
2006–07	58	35	15	0	8	216	182	78	2nd in division	Lost quarterfinal against Nipawin (4:2)
2007–08	58	5	47	-	6	110	271	16	12th overall	Did not qualify
2008–09	56	15	38	-	3	154	229	33	11th overall	Lost quarterfinal against Humboldt (4:2)
2009–10	58	35	19	-	4	228	196	74	3rd overall	Won quarterfinal against Melfort (4:1); Lost semifinal against La Ronge (4:2)
2010–11	58	26	29	-	3	234	256	55	8th overall	Lost preliminary against Flin Flon (3:1)
2011–12	58	41	15	-	2	205	154	84	2nd overall	Won quarterfinal against Nipawin (4:3); Lost semifinal against Humboldt (4:2)
2012–13	54	26	21	2	5	156	164	59	4th in division 7th overall	Lost qualifying round against Melfort (3:0)
2013–14	56	36	17	-	3	176	139	75	1st in division 2nd overall	Won quarterfinal against Estevan (4:1); Lost semifinal against Melville (4:1)
2014–15	56	28	20	6	2	140	164	64	3rd in division 6th overall	Won wild card against Estevan (3:2); Lost quarterfinal against Kindersley (4:0)
2015–16	58	43	11	2	2	239	146	90	1st in division 1st overall	Won quarterfinal against Kindersley (4:1); Lost semifinal against Flin Flon (4:1)
2016–17	58	48	9	1	0	223	103	97	1st in division 1st overall	Won quarterfinal against Weyburn (4:0); Won semifinal against Estevan (4:0); Won final against Flin Flon (4:0)
2017–18	58	42	14	2	0	229	142	86	1st in division 2nd overall	Won quarterfinal against Weyburn (4:0); Lost semifinal against Estevan (4:1)
2018–19	58	35	13	5	5	213	169	80	1st in division 2nd overall	Won quarterfinal against Flin Flon (4:3); Won semifinal against Yorkton (4:0); Won final against Melfort (4:1)
2019–20	58	45	11	2	0	226	150	92	1st in division 1st overall	Cancelled
2020–21	3	0	3	0	0	9	17	0	4th in division 12th overall	Cancelled
2021–22	58	35	17	5	1	207	174	76	2nd in division 4th overall	Lost quarterfinal against Flin Flon (3:2)
2022–23	48	5	2	2	1	284	138	99	1st in division 1st overall	Won quarterfinal against Weyburn (4:1); Won semifinal against Melfort (4:0); Won final against Flin Flon (4:0)
2023–24	56	36	15	4	1	254	197	77	2nd in division 4th overall	Won quarterfinal against Melfort (4:0); Lost semifinal against Flin Flon (4:0)
2024–25	56	29	22	3	2	205	211	63	1st in division 6th overall	Lost quarterfinal against Weyburn (4:2)
2025–26	56	35	15	0	4	226	183	76	1st in division 2nd overall	Won quarterfinal against Melfort (4:1); Lost semifinal against Yorkton (4:3)

Sources:
- "Battlefords Barons statistics and history". hockeydb.com.
- "Battlefords North Stars statistics and history". hockeydb.com.

== Regional championships ==
Western Canada Cup
Year	Round Robin	Record	Standing	Semifinal	Gold Medal Game	Runner-up Game
2017	OTL, Penticton Vees 1–2; L, Portage Terriers 3–5; L, Brooks Bandits 1–4; W, Chilliwack Chiefs 3-0	1-0-2-1	4th of 5	L, Penticton Vees 0-4	n/a	n/a

== National championships ==
Centennial Cup
Year	Round-robin	Record	Standing	Quarterfinal	Semifinal	Championship
2023	W, Kam River Fighting Walleye (SIJHL), 4–1; L, Collingwood Blues (OJHL), 1–3; W, Portage Terriers (Host), 3–2; W, Steinbach Pistons (MJHL), 3-1	3-1-0	1st of 5 Pool B	bye	Won 7–1; Portage Terriers	Lost 3–4; Brooks Bandits

== Alumni ==
- Blair Atcheynum - Ottawa Senators, St. Louis Blues, Nashville Predators, Chicago Blackhawks
- Wade Belak - Colorado Avalanche, Calgary Flames, Toronto Maple Leafs, Florida Panthers, Nashville Predators
- Jaroslav Obsut - St. Louis Blues, Colorado Avalanche
- Mick Vukota - New York Islanders, Tampa Bay Lightning, Montreal Canadiens

== Sources ==
- Pescod, Nicholas (6 May 2023). "Road to the 2023 Centennial Cup: Battlefords North Stars". hockeycanada.ca. Hockey Canada.
- Roblin, Scott (9 May 2023). "Battlefords North Stars to chase first national title at Centennial Cup". Global News. Corus Entertainment.
- "North Stars announce staff re-arrangement". sjhl.ca. Saskatchewan Junior Hockey League. 2 June 2026.

== See also ==
- List of ice hockey teams in Saskatchewan
