= Kindersley Klippers =

Junior ice hockey club

- City: Kindersley, Saskatchewan
- League: SJHL
- Division: Sherwood
- Founded: 1991
- Home arena: West Central Events Centre
- Colours
- General manager: Ryan Gibson
- Head coach: Kyle Schneider
- Website: klippershockey.com

Franchise history
- 1991–1993: Saskatoon Titans
- Since 1993: Kindersley Klippers

Championships
- League: 2002; 2004
- Regional: 2004

The Kindersley Klippers are a junior ice hockey club and franchise of the Saskatchewan Junior Hockey League (SJHL). The team plays its home games at the West Central Events Centre in Kindersley, Saskatchewan.

== History ==
The Saskatoon Titans club was founded in 1991. In 1993, the club relocated to Kindersley, Saskatchewan and was rebranded as the Kindersley Klippers. In 1994, the team became a community owned non-profit organization.

The Klippers won the Membercare Cup as SJHL champions in 2002, but lost the Anavet Cup to the OCN Blizzard of the Manitoba Junior Hockey League. In 2004, the Klippers again won the Membercare Cup, by beating the Weyburn Red Wings. They later won their first Anavet Cup championship by winning the series in the decisive seventh game against the MJHL's Selkirk Steelers. This win sent the Klippers to the 2004 Royal Bank Cup as the western representative. They made it to the Royal Bank Cup final against the OPJHL's Aurora Tigers, where they were defeated 7–1. Their record in the 2004 playoffs was 18 wins and 11 losses.

During the 2008 playoffs, the Klippers looked to win the SJHL championship again. The Klippers first defeated the Weyburn Red Wings in five games, then knocked off the Melville Millionaires in six games. They faced the defending league champion, Humboldt Broncos, in the SJHL championship. The Klippers took a 3–1 series lead over the Broncos, but lost as Humboldt came back with three straight wins to claim the series and championship. The Humboldt Broncos later won the Anavet Cup and the Royal Bank Cup.

In 2010, the team temporarily relocated to the Eston Community Complex after their home arena in Kindersley was damaged by fire. The team posted an 8-0-1 record in Eston to close out the regular season and finish third in the Sherwood Conference. Kindersley then swept the Notre Dame Hounds in the league quarterfinal to advance to the Sherwood final against the Yorkton Terriers, a close series that they lost in overtime of game seven.

Statistics
Season	GP	W	L	T	OTL	SOL	GF	GA	Pts	Regular season	Post-season
1991–92	64	25	36	3	-	-	227	283	53	4th in division	Lost quarterfinal
1992–93	64	20	37	7	-	-	250	303	47	5th in division	Did not qualify
1993–94	68	10	54	4	-	-	190	394	24	6th in division	Did not qualify
1994–95	64	26	29	9	-	-	269	278	61	4th in division	Lost quarterfinal
1995–96	64	12	47	5	-	-	180	327	29	6th in division	Did not qualify
1996–97	64	26	27	11	-	-	223	235	63	4th in division	Lost quarterfinal
1997–98	64	34	23	7	-	-	266	224	75	3rd in division	Lost semifinal
1998–99	66	41	23	2	-	-	270	193	84	2nd in division	Lost quarterfinal
1999–00	60	26	32	2	-	-	224	283	54	6th in division	Lost quarterfinal
2000–01	62	42	17	0	3	-	266	194	87	2nd in division	Lost quarterfinal
2001–02	64	38	18	8	0	-	270	210	84	1st in division	Won quarterfinal against Battlefords (4:3); Won quarterfinal against Melfort (4:1); Won final against Humboldt (4:3)
2002–03	60	35	17	7	1	-	240	189	78	2nd in division	Lost quarterfinal against Battlefords (4:0)
2003–04	60	35	17	7	1	-	217	185	78	3rd in division	Won quarterfinal against Battlefords (4:0); Won semifinal against Humboldt (4:2); Won final against Weyburn (4:2)
2004–05	55	29	20	3	3	-	193	180	64	3rd in division	Lost quarterfinal against Battlefords (4:0)
2005–06	55	6	42	5	2	-	131	245	19	5th in division	Did not qualify
2006–07	58	24	27	-	6	1	168	197	55	6th in division	Did not qualify
2007–08	58	31	22	-	2	3	214	183	67	3rd in division	Won quarterfinal against Weyburn (4:1); Won semifinal against Melville (4:2); Lost final against Humboldt (4:3)
2008–09	56	28	19	-	2	7	168	180	65	4th in division	Lost quarterfinal against Weyburn (4:0)
2009–10	58	31	21	-	3	3	178	183	68	3rd in division 5th overall	Won quarterfinal against Notre Dame (4:0); Lost semifinal against Yorkton (4:3)
2010–11	58	35	20	-	3	0	240	194	73	2nd in division 3rd overall	Won quarterfinal against Weyburn (4:1); Lost semifinal against Yorkton (4:0)
2011–12	58	11	41	-	3	3	148	248	28	6th in division 12th overall	Did not qualify
2012–13	54	22	27	-	3	2	154	200	49	4th in division 8th overall	Lost preliminary round
2013–14	56	34	16	-	3	3	165	130	74	2nd in division 3rd overall	Lost quarterfinal against Melville (4:0)
2014–15	56	37	12	-	3	4	191	134	81	1st in division 2nd overall	Won quarterfinal against Battlefords (4:0); Lost semifinal against Notre Dame (4:2)
2015–16	58	25	30	-	1	2	194	232	53	2nd in division 8th overall	Won wild card against Notre Dame (3:1); Lost quarterfinal against Battlefords (4:1)
2016–17	58	25	30	-	3	0	176	199	53	4th in division 9th overall	Lost wild card against Weyburn (3:0)
2017–18	58	29	22	-	4	3	170	174	65	3rd in division 6th overall	Lost quarterfinal against Estevan (4:0)
2018–19	58	36	16	-	4	2	184	141	78	2nd in division 4th overall	Lost quarterfinal against Melfort (4:1)
2019–20	58	24	27	-	6	1	163	201	55	3rd in division 9th overall	Did not qualify
2020–21	3	2	1	-	0	0	9	6	4	2nd in division 7th overall	Cancelled
2021–22	58	24	32	-	1	1	145	208	50	4th in division 9th overall	Did not qualify
2022–23	56	13	34	-	4	5	144	235	35	4th in division 11th overall	Did not qualify
2023–24	56	23	26	-	5	2	173	206	53	3rd in division 8th overall	Lost quarterfinal against Flin Flon (4:0)
2024–25	56	25	26	-	3	2	169	181	55	3rd in division 8th overall	Lost quarterfinal against Melfort (4:1)
2025–26	56	22	25	-	3	6	175	199	53	3rd in division 10th overall	Did not qualify

Source: "Kindersley Klippers statistics and history". hockeydb.com.

== See also ==
- List of ice hockey teams in Saskatchewan
