= Yorkton Terriers =

Junior ice hockey club

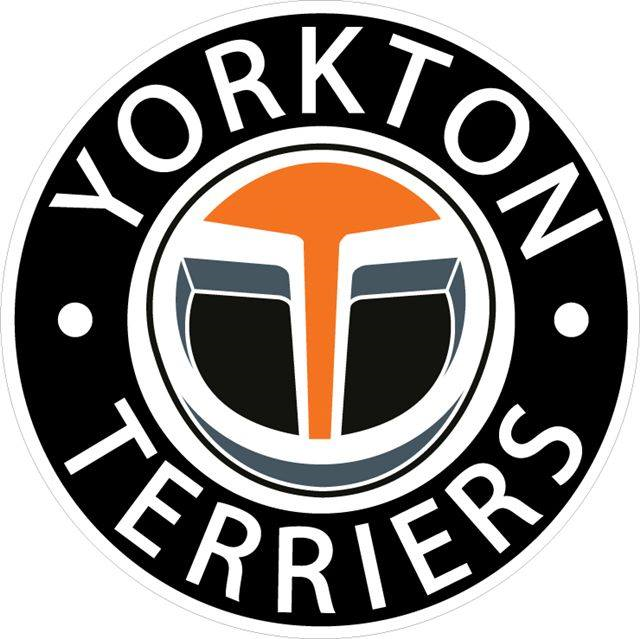
- City: Yorkton, Saskatchewan
- League: SJHL
- Division: Bunge
- Founded: 1972
- Home arena: Gallagher Centre
- Colours
- General manager: Emery Olauson
- Head coach: Emery Olauson
- Website: yorktonterriers.com

Championships
- League: 1983; 1991; 2005; 2006; 2013; 2014
- Regional: 1991; 2006; 2014
- National: 2014

The Yorkton Terriers Junior Hockey Club is a member of the Saskatchewan Junior Hockey League (SJHL). The team plays its home games at the Gallagher Centre in Yorkton, Saskatchewan.

== History ==
The Terriers joined the SJHL as an expansion franchise in the 1972–73 season, adopting the name of the defunct Yorkton Terriers Saskatchewan Senior Hockey League (SSHL) franchise that folded in 1971.

Gerry James, who had played senior hockey in Yorkton before going onto pro careers in both the National Hockey League and the Canadian Football League was hired as the first coach of the junior Terriers.

The first player to score a goal for the SJHL Terriers was Brian Lauder against the Melville Millionaires, setting the stage for the Highway 10 rivalry that continues between the two clubs today, named for the highway that connects the two communities.

The SJHL's all-time leading scorer, Darrell Spelay, played for the Terriers between 1979 and 1983, scoring 243 goals in 246 games.

The Terriers won league championships in 1983, 1991, 2005, 2006, 2013, and 2014.

The Terriers have competed in four national championship tournaments: 1991 in Sudbury, Ontario, 1996 in Melfort, Saskatchewan, 1999 as the hosts in Yorkton, 2006 in Brampton, Ontario, and 2014 in Vernon, British Columbia.

The 2013–14 Terriers defeated the Carleton Place Canadians of the CCHL in overtime to win the 2014 Royal Bank Cup national championship.

The Terriers made it back to the SJHL championship in 2026 for the first time since their national title, losing in a four game sweep to the Flin Flon Bombers.

== Season-by-season standings ==
Statistics
| Season | GP | W | L | T | OTL | SOL | GF | GA | Pts | Regular season | Post-season |
|---|---|---|---|---|---|---|---|---|---|---|---|
| 1972–73 | 48 | 20 | 28 | 0 | 0 | 0 | 201 | 223 | 40 | 4th in division | Lost quarterfinal |
| 1973–74 | 50 | 28 | 19 | 3 | 0 | 0 | 269 | 229 | 59 | 2nd in division | Lost quarterfinal |
| 1974–75 | 58 | 24 | 32 | 2 | 0 | 0 | 257 | 321 | 50 | 6th in division | Did not qualify |
| 1975–76 | 58 | 13 | 42 | 3 | 0 | 0 | 212 | 369 | 29 | 5th in division | Did not qualify |
| 1976–77 | 60 | 9 | 51 | 0 | 0 | 0 | 233 | 446 | 18 | 6th in division | Did not qualify |
| 1977–78 | 60 | 20 | 40 | 0 | 0 | 0 | 230 | 304 | 40 | 6th in division | Did not qualify |
| 1978–79 | 60 | 20 | 39 | 1 | 0 | 0 | 247 | 333 | 41 | 5th in division | Did not qualify |
| 1979–80 | 60 | 14 | 44 | 2 | 0 | 0 | 259 | 399 | 30 | 6th in division | Did not qualify |
| 1980–81 | 60 | 32 | 26 | 2 | 0 | 0 | 313 | 307 | 66 | 3rd in division | Lost quarterfinal |
| 1981–82 | 60 | 40 | 18 | 2 | 0 | 0 | 342 | 248 | 82 | 1st in division | Won quarterfinal against Melville; Won semifinal against Weyburn; Lost final against Prince Albert (4:0) |
| 1982–83 | 64 | 51 | 13 | 0 | 0 | 0 | 479 | 278 | 102 | 2nd overall | Won quarterfinal against Estevan (4:0); Won semifinal against Melville (4:1); Won final against Weyburn (4:3); Lost ANAVET Cup against Dauphin (4:1) |
| 1983–84 | 64 | 46 | 18 | 0 | 0 | 0 | 389 | 254 | 92 | 1st overall | Won quarterfinal Won semifinal against Lloydminster; Lost final against Weyburn |
| 1984–85 | 64 | 8 | 53 | 3 | 0 | 0 | 211 | 424 | 19 | 9th overall | Did not qualify |
| 1985–86 | 60 | 29 | 31 | 0 | 0 | 0 | 269 | 326 | 58 | 5th overall | Lost quarterfinal |
| 1986–87 | 64 | 31 | 33 | 0 | 0 | 0 | 306 | 331 | 62 | 4th overall | Won quarterfinal Lost semifinal against Humboldt |
| 1987–88 | 60 | 36 | 22 | 2 | 0 | 0 | 321 | 242 | 74 | 3rd overall | Won quarterfinal Won semifinal Lost final against Notre Dame (4:2) |
| 1988–89 | 64 | 37 | 25 | 2 | 0 | 0 | 334 | 310 | 76 | 2nd in division | Won quarterfinal against Flin Flon (4:0); Lost semifinal |
| 1989–90 | 68 | 39 | 26 | 3 | 0 | 0 | 289 | 259 | 81 | 2nd in division | Won quarterfinal Won semifinal Lost final against Nipawin (4:2) |
| 1990–91 | 68 | 47 | 19 | 2 | 0 | 0 | 344 | 241 | 96 | 1st overall | Won quarterfinal against Notre Dame (4:0); Won semifinal against Weyburn (4:1); Won final against Humboldt (4:0); Won regional championship against Winkler (4:1) |
| 1991–92 | 64 | 36 | 26 | 2 | 0 | 0 | 291 | 240 | 74 | 4th in division | Lost quarterfinal |
| 1992–93 | 64 | 36 | 23 | 5 | 0 | 0 | 287 | 229 | 77 | 2nd in division | Lost quarterfinal |
| 1993–94 | 68 | 37 | 25 | 6 | 0 | 0 | 311 | 248 | 80 | 3rd in division | Lost quarterfinal |
| 1994–95 | 64 | 35 | 27 | 2 | 0 | 0 | 286 | 267 | 72 | 2nd in division | Lost quarterfinal |
| 1995–96 | 64 | 47 | 11 | 6 | 0 | 0 | 297 | 206 | 100 | 1st overall | Won quarterfinal Won semifinal against Estevan; Lost final against Melfort |
| 1996–97 | 64 | 18 | 42 | 4 | 0 | 0 | 188 | 261 | 40 | 6th in division | Did not qualify |
| 1997–98 | 64 | 20 | 40 | 4 | 0 | 0 | 217 | 277 | 44 | 6th in division | Did not qualify |
| 1998–99 | 66 | 41 | 19 | 6 | 0 | 0 | 269 | 211 | 88 | 2nd in division | Lost quarterfinal |
| 1999–00 | 60 | 32 | 24 | 4 | 0 | 0 | 220 | 243 | 68 | 3rd in division | Lost preliminary |
| 2000–01 | 62 | 22 | 36 | 0 | 4 | 0 | 201 | 280 | 48 | 5th in division | Did not qualify |
| 2001–02 | 64 | 22 | 35 | 3 | 4 | 0 | 220 | 255 | 51 | 6th in division | Did not qualify |
| 2002–03 | 60 | 28 | 21 | 8 | 3 | 0 | 227 | 200 | 67 | 2nd in division | Won quarterfinal Lost semifinal |
| 2003–04 | 60 | 27 | 29 | 4 | 0 | 0 | 221 | 227 | 58 | 4th in division | Won quarterfinal Lost semifinal |
| 2004–05 | 55 | 32 | 15 | 5 | 3 | 0 | 201 | 144 | 72 | 2nd in division | Won quarterfinal Won semifinal (4:3); Won final against Battlefords (4:3) |
| 2005–06 | 55 | 37 | 11 | 4 | 3 | 0 | 213 | 130 | 81 | 1st in division | Won quarterfinal against Weyburn (4:2); Won semifinal against Notre Dame (4:0); Won final against Battlefords (4:1); Won regional championship against Winnipeg (4:1); Lost national championship final against Burnaby |
| 2006–07 | 58 | 26 | 22 | 0 | 4 | 6 | 177 | 181 | 62 | 3rd in division | Won quarterfinal against Estevan; Lost semifinal against Melville (4:3) |
| 2007–08 | 58 | 23 | 27 | 0 | 3 | 5 | 140 | 174 | 54 | 9th overall | Won preliminary against Estevan (4:2); Lost quarterfinal against Melville (4:0) |
| 2008–09 | 56 | 30 | 18 | 0 | 1 | 7 | 175 | 155 | 68 | 5th overall | Lost quarterfinal against Melville (4:3) |
| 2009–10 | 58 | 24 | 30 | 0 | 3 | 1 | 144 | 173 | 52 | 10th overall | Won preliminary against Melville (3:1); Won quarterfinal against Weyburn (4:1); Won semifinal against Kindersley (4:3); Lost final against La Ronge (4:2) |
| 2010–11 | 58 | 34 | 16 | 0 | 3 | 5 | 209 | 178 | 76 | 2nd overall | Won quarterfinal against Estevan (4:0); Won semifinal against Kindersley (4:0); Lost final against La Ronge (4:3) |
| 2011–12 | 58 | 33 | 20 | 0 | 2 | 3 | 198 | 162 | 71 | 5th overall | Lost quarterfinal against Melville (4:1) |
| 2012–13 | 54 | 36 | 14 | 0 | 1 | 3 | 196 | 148 | 76 | 1st in division | Won quarterfinal against Estevan (4:1); Won semifinal against Melville (4:2); Won final against Humboldt (4:2); Lost regional runner-up game against Brooks |
| 2013–14 | 56 | 37 | 12 | 0 | 2 | 5 | 186 | 125 | 81 | 1st overall | Won quarterfinal against Notre Dame (4:1); Won semifinal against Humboldt (4:1); Won final against Melville (4:0); Won regional championship against Dauphin; Won national championship against Carleton Place |
| 2014–15 | 56 | 17 | 32 | 0 | 4 | 3 | 138 | 203 | 41 | 4th in division 12th overall | Did not qualify |
| 2015–16 | 58 | 20 | 29 | 0 | 4 | 5 | 184 | 219 | 49 | 3rd in division 10th overall | Lost wild card against La Ronge (3:0) |
| 2016–17 | 58 | 28 | 25 | 0 | 5 | 0 | 162 | 194 | 61 | 2nd in division 6th overall | Lost quarterfinal against Estevan (4:1) |
| 2017–18 | 58 | 13 | 40 | 0 | 3 | 2 | 136 | 280 | 31 | 4th in division 11th overall | Did not qualify |
| 2018–19 | 58 | 31 | 26 | 0 | 1 | 0 | 242 | 234 | 63 | 2nd in division 8th overall | Won wild card against Notre Dame (2:1); Won quarterfinal against Nipawin (4:3); Lost semifinal against Battlefords (4:0) |
| 2019–20 | 58 | 35 | 20 | 0 | 2 | 1 | 197 | 183 | 73 | 1st in division 3rd overall | Quarterfinal against La Ronge tied (2:2); Playoffs cancelled |
| 2020–21 | 6 | 3 | 2 | 0 | 1 | 0 | 27 | 27 | 7 | Season cancelled | |
| 2021–22 | 58 | 29 | 22 | 0 | 1 | 6 | 178 | 162 | 65 | 2nd in division 6th overall | Won quarterfinal against Melfort (4:3); Lost semifinal against Estevan (4:0) |
| 2022–23 | 56 | 19 | 36 | 0 | 0 | 1 | 155 | 233 | 39 | 3rd in division 10th overall | Did not qualify |
| 2023–24 | 56 | 21 | 30 | 0 | 2 | 3 | 185 | 232 | 47 | 4th in division 10th overall | Did not qualify |
| 2024–25 | 56 | 33 | 21 | 0 | 2 | 0 | 217 | 198 | 68 | 2nd in division 4th overall | Won quarterfinal against Melville (4:1); Lost semifinal against Melfort (4:0) |
| 2025–26 | 56 | 37 | 17 | 0 | 1 | 1 | 237 | 171 | 76 | 1st in division 2nd overall | Won quarterfinal against Melville (4:2); Won semifinal against Battlefords (4:3); Lost final against Flin Flon (4:0) |

Source: "Yorkton Terriers hockey team statistics and history". hockeydb.com.

== See also ==
2005–06 Terriers logo

- List of ice hockey teams in Saskatchewan

== Sources ==
- Schafer, Tim (1 November 1995). "Cup bid in the works". Yorkton This Week & Enterprise.
- "Road to the RBC Cup: Yorkton Terriers". hockeycanada.ca. Hockey Canada. 9 May 2014.
- "Yorkton Terriers win 2014 RBC Cup". hockeycanada.ca. Hockey Canada. 18 May 2014.
- Wilson, Steven (29 January 2024). "SJHL's Yorkton Terriers seek public support to stay afloat". WestCentralOnline.
- McLernon, Will (30 January 2024). "Yorkton Terriers hockey team at risk of folding due to poor attendance". CBC News. CBC/Radio-Canada.
- Butts, Sierra D'Souza (28 February 2024). "Yorkton Terriers making financial comeback thanks to community support". CTVNews. Bell Media.
- "After successful season ticket blitz, SJHL's Terriers will remain in Yorkton". WestCentralOnline. 4 March 2024.
- "Harvard Media wins gold for Yorkton's Save the Terriers campaign". SaskToday.ca. Harvard Media. 31 May 2025.
- Walchuk, Benny (25 August 2026). "SJHL's Yorkton Terriers post profit at 2026 annual general meeting". GX94 Radio. Harvard Media.

| Preceded by Brooks Bandits | Royal Bank Cup Champions; 2014 | Succeeded by Portage Terriers |
