= Nipawin Hawks =

Junior ice hockey team

- City: Nipawin, Saskatchewan
- League: SJHL
- Division: Sherwood
- Founded: 1985
- Home arena: Centennial Arena
- Colours
- General manager: Tad Kozun
- Head coach: Tad Kozun
- Website: nipawinhawks.sk.ca

Championships
- League: 1990; 2018
- Regional: 1990

The Nipawin Hawks are a junior ice hockey team based in Nipawin, Saskatchewan. They are members of the Saskatchewan Junior Hockey League (SJHL). They play their home games at the Centennial Arena, which has a seating capacity of 1,500. The team colors are black and gold.

The Hawks won league championships in 1990 and 2018, and the regional championship ANAVET Cup in 1990, coached by Bob Lowes.

== Arena ==
The Hawks play their home games at Centennial Arena, affectionately known as "the Cage". Centennial Arena was built in 1967 and is owned by the Town of Nipawin.

== History ==
Founded in 1985, the Hawks won their first league championship in 1990 against the Humboldt Broncos. The team went on to win the regional championship ANAVET Cup, defeating the Portage Terriers of the Manitoba Junior Hockey League four games to two. The Hawks then went on to take third place at the national championship Centennial Cup tournament in Vernon, British Columbia.

The next time the Hawks won a league championship was in 2018. The victory was overshadowed by the Humboldt Broncos bus crash in which 16 members of the Humboldt Broncos were killed and 13 were injured. The crash happened as the Broncos were en route to Nipawin to play game 5 of the semifinal against the Hawks.

Statistics
Season	GP	W	L	T	OTL	GF	GA	P	Finish	Playoffs
1985–86	60	18	42	0	-	261	394	36	9th in league	Did not qualify
1986–87	64	27	32	5	-	300	323	59	5th in league	Lost 1st round
1987–88	60	34	22	4	-	293	246	72	4th in league	
1988–89	64	40	20	4	-	332	244	84	2nd in league North	
1989–90	68	43	21	4	-	343	244	90	2nd in league	Won league championship Won regional championship
1990–91	68	40	27	1	-	293	241	81	2nd in league	Lost semifinal
1991–92	64	24	37	3	-	248	260	51	5th in league	Did not qualify
1992–93	64	28	31	5	-	262	266	61	4th in league	Lost quarterfinal
1993–94	68	32	25	11	-	304	254	75	5th in league	Lost quarterfinal
1994–95	64	39	21	4	-	258	199	82	2nd in league	Lost quarterfinal
1995–96	64	35	22	7	-	278	217	77	3rd in league	Lost quarterfinal
1996–97	64	40	17	7	-	294	212	87	1st in league	Lost semifinal
1997–98	64	40	20	4	-	272	192	84	1st in league	Lost final
1998–99	66	29	35	2	-	229	249	60	6th in league	Did not qualify
1999-00	60	50	8	2	-	269	144	102	1st in league	Lost 1st round
2000–01	62	34	26	1	1	274	218	70	3rd in league	Lost final
2001–02	64	35	15	10	4	249	190	84	2nd in league	Lost quarterfinal
2002–03	60	18	25	12	5	186	230	53	6th in league	Did not qualify
2003–04	60	27	27	5	1	180	195	60	4th in league	Lost quarterfinal
2004–05	55	25	20	5	5	164	154	60	4th in league	Lost 1st round
2005–06	55	38	12	2	3	193	139	81	2nd SJHL Itech	Lost quarterfinal
2006–07	58	36	17	0	5	209	169	77	4th SJHL Itech	Lost in Conference Final
2007–08	58	23	29	-	6	150	202	52	5th SJHL Itech	Lost semifinal
2008–09	56	26	26	-	4	156	190	56	4th in league	Lost quarterfinal
2009–10	58	20	31	-	7	172	237	47	11th in league	Did not qualify
2010–11	58	17	36	-	5	154	258	39	12th in league	Did not qualify
2011–12	58	34	20	-	4	204	167	72	3rd in division 4th in league	Lost quarterfinal
2012–13	54	32	14	-	8	172	137	72	2nd in division 4th in league	Lost quarterfinal
2013–14	56	25	27	-	4	150	175	54	2nd in division 8th in league	Lost preliminary round
2014–15	56	33	17	2	4	173	160	72	3rd in division 6th in league	Won quarterfinal against Melville (4:2); Lost semifinal against Melfort (1:4)
2015–16	58	36	17	3	2	206	172	77	2nd in division 4th in league	Won quarterfinal against Estevan (4:2); Lost semifinal against Melfort (3:4)
2016–17	58	40	15	2	1	200	118	83	1st in division 3rd in league	Won quarterfinal against Humboldt (4:0); Lost semifinal against Flin Flon (3:4)
2017–18	58	43	8	3	4	232	131	93	1st in division 1st in league	Won quarterfinal against Flin Flon (4:1); Led semifinal against Humboldt (3:1) (Note: Series unfinished due to Humboldt Broncos bus crash. Hawks advanced after league approved of finishing the playoffs.); Won final against Estevan (4:3)
2018–19	58	38	15	2	3	159	118	81	1st in division 1st in league	Lost quarterfinal against Yorkton (4:3)
2019–20	58	30	24	3	1	183	170	64	4th in division 8th in league	Cancelled
2020–21	6	4	2	0	0	19	16	8	2nd in division 5th in league	Cancelled
2021–22	58	17	35	0	6	128	208	40	4th in division 11th in league	Did not qualify
2022–23	56	26	24	5	1	182	192	58	4th in division 7th in league	Lost quarterfinal against Humboldt (4:1)
2023–24	56	22	29	1	4	180	194	49	3rd in division 9th in league	Did not qualify
2024–25	56	17	33	3	3	146	228	40	4th in division 11th in league	Did not qualify
2025–26	56	35	19	0	1	207	160	72	2nd in division 4th overall	Lost quarterfinal against Weyburn (4:2)

Source: "Nipawin Hawks hockey team statistics and history". hockeydb.com.

== NHL alumni ==
- Curtis Murphy – Minnesota Wild
- Adam Beckman – Minnesota Wild
- Greg Classen - Nashville Predators

== See also ==
- List of ice hockey teams in Saskatchewan
