= Saskatoon Rage =

Canadian junior hockey team

- City: Saskatoon, Saskatchewan
- League: SJHL
- Founded: 1987
- Folded: 1999
- Home arena: Harold Latrace Arena

The Saskatoon Rage were a Tier-II Junior "A" team based in Saskatoon, Saskatchewan, who played in the Saskatchewan Junior Hockey League.

Minot Americans 1987−1994
Minot Top Guns 1994−1997
Beardy's Rage 1997−1998
Saskatoon Rage 1998−1999

== History ==
The Rage franchise originated in 1987 in the city of Minot, North Dakota, originally named the Minot Americans before later becoming the Minot Top Guns in homage to both the 1986 movie Top Gun and the nearby Minot Air Force Base.

The team was never very successful as the SJHL's first and only franchise based in the United States. They faced low attendance and a consistent losing record. During one of their final seasons in Minot, the Top Guns had to play their first 14 games on the road due to bookings at their home arena, then fired their coach after a 20-game losing streak and faced immigration-related issues in finding a replacement.

The franchise was sold to interested parties at the Beardy's 97, Saskatchewan reserve in 1997 after beginning discussions with the team's ownership the previous year. That arrangement lasted one season in 1997-98.

In 1998-99, the team became the Saskatoon Rage and played their home games at Harold Latrace Arena. It marked the SJHL's return to Saskatoon for the first time since the Saskatoon J's folded in 1982, but the Rage would meet a similar fate and folded after one season in Saskatoon due to financial reasons.

== Season-by-season standings ==
Season	GP	W	L	T	OTL	GF	GA	P	Results	Playoffs
1987-88	60	20	35	5	-	246	310	45	9th SJHL	
1988-89	64	32	30	2	-	305	328	66	3rd SJHL South	
1989-90	68	25	39	4	-	259	334	54	5th SJHL South	DNQ
1990-91	68	13	52	3	-	219	378	29	6th SJHL South	DNQ
1991-92	64	21	40	3	-	218	317	45	6th SJHL South	DNQ
1992-93	64	15	44	5	-	228	357	35	6th SJHL South	DNQ
1993-94	68	12	49	7	-	193	318	31	7th SJHL South	DNQ
1994-95	64	24	35	5	-	264	287	53	6th SJHL South	DNQ
1995-96	64	19	39	6	-	231	304	44	6th SJHL South	DNQ
1996-97	64	24	33	7	-	219	265	55	4th SJHL South	Lost quarter-final
1997-98	64	18	43	3	-	185	309	39	7th SJHL North	DNQ
1998-99	66	9	55	2	-	176	362	20	7th SJHL South	DNQ

=== Playoffs ===
- 1988 DNQ
- 1989 Lost quarter-final

Notre Dame Hounds defeated Minot Americans 4-games-to-2

- 1990 DNQ
- 1991 DNQ
- 1992 DNQ
- 1993 DNQ
- 1994 DNQ
- 1995 DNQ
- 1996 DNQ
- 1997 Lost preliminary

Estevan Bruins defeated Minot Top Guns 2-games-to-none

- 1998 DNQ
- 1999 DNQ
