= North Battleford Civic Centre =

Multi-purpose arena in North Battleford, Saskatchewan

Coordinates: 52.786°N 108.293°W

The North Battleford Access Communications Centre, formerly known as the Civic Centre, is a 2,500-seat multi-purpose arena in North Battleford, Saskatchewan built in 1962. It is home to the Battlefords North Stars ice hockey team. It is also home to the North Battleford Kinsmen Indoor Rodeo, held annually every April.

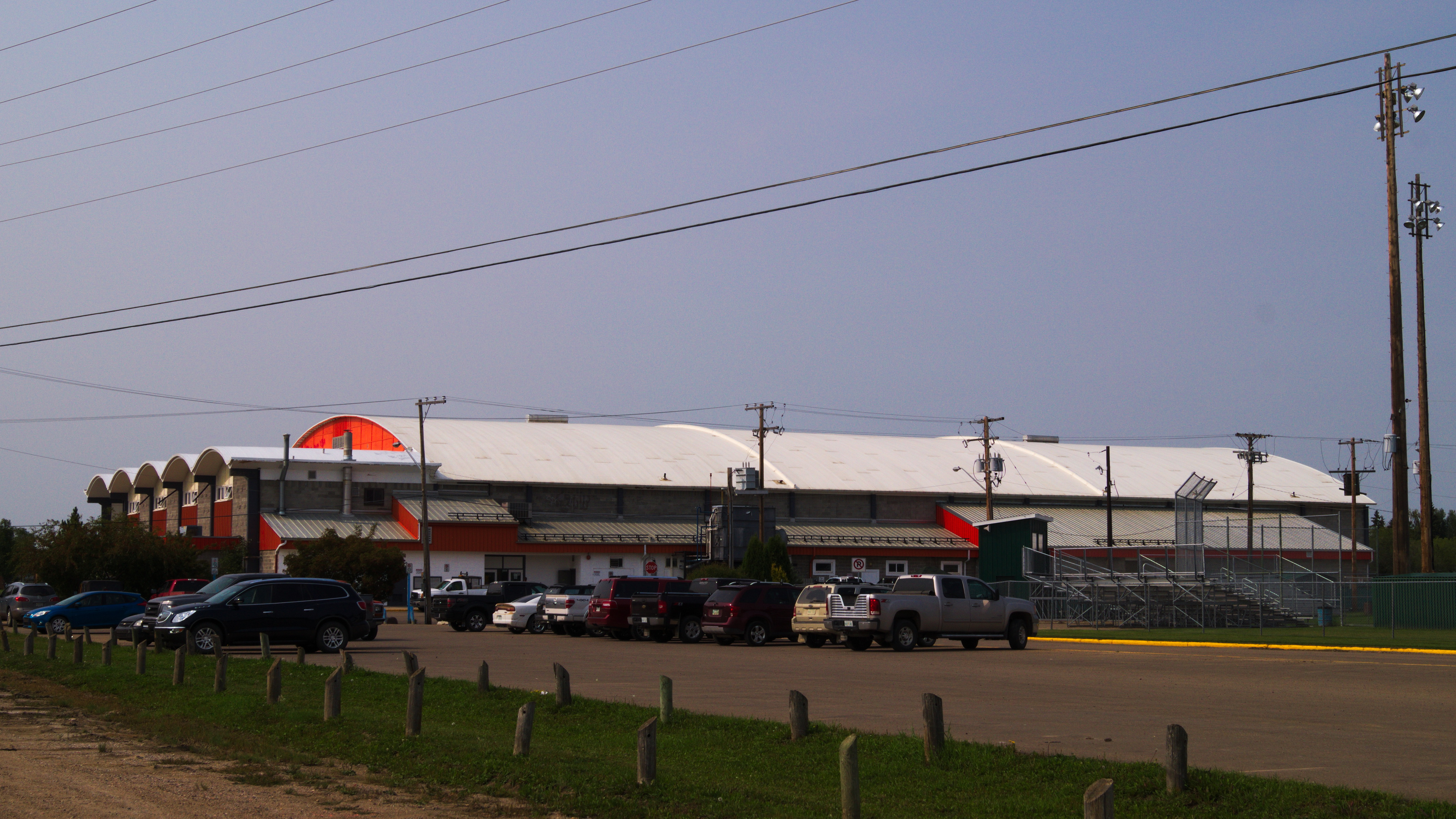
North Battleford Civic Centre
