= Saskatchewan Junior Hockey League =

Ice hockey league in Saskatchewan, Canada

- Current season, competition or edition: 2026–27 SJHL season
- Formerly: Saskatchewan Amateur Junior Hockey League
- Sport: Ice hockey
- Founded: 1968
- Commissioner: Kyle McIntyre
- No. of teams: 12
- Region: Saskatchewan; Manitoba
- Most recent champion: Flin Flon Bombers (2nd)
- Most titles: Humboldt Broncos (10)
- Broadcaster: SaskTel maxTV
- Related competitions: Centennial Cup
- Website: sjhl.ca

The Saskatchewan Junior Hockey League is a Junior 'A' ice hockey league operating in the Canadian province of Saskatchewan and one of nine member leagues of the Canadian Junior Hockey League.

Open to North American-born players 20 years of age or younger, the SJHL's 12 teams play in three divisions: the Nutrien, Sherwood and Viterra Divisions. A major attraction in Saskatchewan, the SJHL draws 400,000 fans each season. The winner of the SJHL playoffs is crowned the provincial Junior A champion and continues on to play in the ANAVET Cup against the Manitoba provincial champion (winner of the Manitoba Junior Hockey League playoffs) for the right to represent the Western region at the Centennial Cup, the national Junior A championship.

== History ==
The current version of the SJHL was preceded by a separate league with the same name that operated from 1948 to 1966.

The modern SJHL was formed in July 1968 as a result of the Western Canada Hockey League (WCHL) splitting away from the Canadian Amateur Hockey Association (CAHA) and affiliating with the rival Canadian Hockey Association led by Ron Butlin. CAHA president Lloyd Pollock arranged meetings across Western Canada to outline the CAHA's development plan for teams which had remained within the CAHA. Later that month, he approved a series of exhibition games for teams in the Ontario Hockey Association to play the Regina Pats and Weyburn Red Wings, after Regina and Weyburn had asked for assistance in forming a new Saskatchewan Junior Hockey League. Pollock also laid out plans to make player transfers easier between provinces to support the Saskatchewan teams.

The league was originally known as the Saskatchewan Amateur Junior Hockey League until 1973. They re-adopted the "Amateur" in their name in 1980 and carried it until the 1987–88 season, when they dropped the "Amateur" again. They were one of the original Tier II Junior A leagues in the realignment of 1970. Their first two seasons they were eligible for the Memorial Cup.

=== Humboldt Broncos bus crash ===
On April 6, 2018 the Humboldt Broncos team bus suffered a fatal crash on their way to the team's semi-final playoff game against the Nipawin Hawks. Ten players, two coaches, an athletic therapist, two employees of a local radio station, and the bus driver were killed in the collision. The remaining passengers were injured, some critically. The SJHL playoffs were postponed as a result (the Hawks were leading the series 3–1). The league, at the request of the Broncos, resumed the playoffs on April 15, with the Hawks advancing to the finals to meet the waiting Estevan Bruins. SJHL President Bill Chow called the incident the league's "worst nightmare".

In the wake of the Humboldt Broncos bus crash, TSN aired a national broadcast of the Bronco's 2018–19 home opener, the team's first regular season game following the tragedy.

=== Impact of the COVID-19 pandemic ===
On March 13, 2020, pursuant to the suspension of all sanctioned activity by Hockey Canada and the CJHL due to the COVID-19 pandemic, the remainder of the 2019–20 SJHL season and all associated championships were suspended until further notice. The league championship was not awarded.

The league resumed play for a 2020–21 season in November 2020, with the Saskatchewan Health Authority (SHA) allowing for limited in-person attendance (150 spectators). However, the Flin Flon Bombers were forced to suspend operations on November 12, 2020 until at least the new year, after Manitoba issued a "Code Red" circuit breaker that ordered the closure of non-essential businesses and recreational facilities. The team considered the possibility of conducting all hockey operations out of nearby Creighton, Saskatchewan, but were unable to reach agreements with the SHA and Manitoba Health that would allow them to resume operations. In turn, the SJHL was forced to suspend play on November 27, as Saskatchewan ordered the suspension of all group and team sports activities.

In February 2021, the league submitted a return-to-play proposal to the Saskatchewan government that would have involved as many as three hub cities. Despite other provinces such as Alberta having allowed their Junior A leagues to continue, Saskatchewan continued to maintain its prohibitions on sport. The SJHL and its teams have faced growing financial issues due to cancelled games and other events, prompting the provincial government to provide a $1 million relief package to be divided between its teams. On March 23, 2021, the SJHL announced that its return-to-play proposal had been rejected, citing concerns surrounding the current state of the pandemic in Saskatchewan. The SJHL therefore announced that the 2020–21 season had been cancelled and will not be resumed. The league championship was not awarded for the second season in a row.

=== Media ===
In January 2019, the league announced a broadcasting deal with SaskTel, under which a game will be carried on its television service per-month for the remainder of the season, as well as coverage of the league final.

== Teams ==
The SJHL fields twelve teams, eleven in Saskatchewan and one in Flin Flon, Manitoba, a community on the border between the provinces. The Bobcats based in Lloydminster, Saskatchewan (on the Saskatchewan–Alberta border) elect to play in the Alberta Junior Hockey League. In 2025, the Notre Dame Hounds franchise relocated to Warman and was rebranded as the Warman Wolverines. Receiving a new sponsorship from Bunge Global for the 2025–26 season, the Viterra Division was renamed the Bunge Division.

Bunge Division
Team	City	Arena	Joined
Estevan Bruins	Estevan, Saskatchewan	Affinity Place	1971
Melville Millionaires	Melville, Saskatchewan	CN Community Centre	1970
Weyburn Red Wings	Weyburn, Saskatchewan	Crescent Point Place	1968
Yorkton Terriers	Yorkton, Saskatchewan	Farrell Agencies Arena	1972
Nutrien Division
Team	City	Arena	Joined
Battlefords North Stars	North Battleford, Saskatchewan	North Battleford Civic Centre	1973
Humboldt Broncos	Humboldt, Saskatchewan	Elgar Peterson Arena	1970
Kindersley Klippers	Kindersley, Saskatchewan	West Central Events Centre	1991
Warman Wolverines	Warman, Saskatchewan	Warman Home Centre Communiplex	2025
UPL Division
Team	City	Arena	Joined
Flin Flon Bombers	Flin Flon, Manitoba	Whitney Forum	1984
La Ronge Ice Wolves	La Ronge, Saskatchewan	Jonas Roberts Memorial Community Centre	1998
Melfort Mustangs	Melfort, Saskatchewan	Northern Lights Palace	1988
Nipawin Hawks	Nipawin, Saskatchewan	Centennial Arena	1985

Map of SJHL teams
⬤ Bunge Division
⬤ Nutrien Division
⬤ UPL North Division

=== Former ===
- Lebret Eagles
- Lloydminster Lancers
- Moose Jaw Canucks
- Notre Dame Hounds
- Prince Albert Raiders
- Regina Blues
- Regina Pats
- Regina Silver Foxes
- Saskatoon Olympics
- Saskatoon Rage
- Saskatoon Titans
- Swift Current Broncos (SJHL)
- Minot Top Guns

== League champions ==
As of 2023, the championship team is awarded the Canterra Seeds Cup following a post-season playoff tournament. As of 2022, SJHL championship team advances directly to the Junior A national championship. Prior to 2022, the SJHL champions competed with the MJHL champions for the ANAVET Cup with the winner advancing to represent the region at the national competition. In 2022, Hockey Canada moved to a 10-team format for the Centennial Cup, including the champions from each of the 9 leagues that make up the CJHL, and the host team, thus eliminating intervening regional contests for the ANAVET Cup, the Fred Page Cup and the Doyle Cup.

Year	League Champion	League Runner-up
Hanbidge Cup (Memorial Cup Era)
1969	Regina Pats	Weyburn Red Wings
1970	Weyburn Red Wings	Regina Pats
Hanbidge Cup (Centennial Cup Era)
1971	Weyburn Red Wings	Humboldt Broncos
1972	Humboldt Broncos	Melville Millionaires
1973	Humboldt Broncos	Estevan Bruins
1974	Prince Albert Raiders	Estevan Bruins
1975	Swift Current Broncos	Prince Albert Raiders
1976	Prince Albert Raiders	Weyburn Red Wings
1977	Prince Albert Raiders	Melville Millionaires
1978	Prince Albert Raiders	Moose Jaw Canucks
1979	Prince Albert Raiders	Moose Jaw Canucks
1980	Prince Albert Raiders	Moose Jaw Canucks
1981	Prince Albert Raiders	Moose Jaw Canucks
1982	Prince Albert Raiders	Yorkton Terriers
1983	Yorkton Terriers	Weyburn Red Wings
1984	Weyburn Red Wings	Yorkton Terriers
1985	Estevan Bruins	Weyburn Red Wings
1986	Humboldt Broncos	Estevan Bruins
1987	Humboldt Broncos	Lloydminster Lancers
1988	Notre Dame Hounds	Yorkton Terriers
1989	Humboldt Broncos	Nipawin Hawks
1990	Nipawin Hawks	Yorkton Terriers
1991	Yorkton Terriers	Humboldt Broncos
1992	Melfort Mustangs	Estevan Bruins
1993	Flin Flon Bombers	Melville Millionaires
1994	Weyburn Red Wings	Melfort Mustangs
1995	Weyburn Red Wings	North Battleford Stars
1996	Melfort Mustangs	Yorkton Terriers
1997	Weyburn Red Wings	North Battleford Stars
1998	Weyburn Red Wings	Nipawin Hawks
Membercare Cup
1999	Estevan Bruins	Humboldt Broncos
2000	Battlefords North Stars	Weyburn Red Wings
2001	Weyburn Red Wings	Nipawin Hawks
2002	Kindersley Klippers	Humboldt Broncos
2003	Humboldt Broncos	Melville Millionaires
2004	Kindersley Klippers	Weyburn Red Wings
Credential Cup
2005	Yorkton Terriers	Battlefords North Stars
2006	Yorkton Terriers	Battlefords North Stars
2007	Humboldt Broncos	Melville Millionaires
2008	Humboldt Broncos	Kindersley Klippers
2009	Humboldt Broncos	Melville Millionaires
Credit Union Cup
2010	La Ronge Ice Wolves	Yorkton Terriers
2011	La Ronge Ice Wolves	Yorkton Terriers
Canalta Cup
2012	Humboldt Broncos	Weyburn Red Wings
2013	Yorkton Terriers	Humboldt Broncos
2014	Yorkton Terriers	Melville Millionaires
2015	Melfort Mustangs	Notre Dame Hounds
2016	Melfort Mustangs	Flin Flon Bombers
2017	Battlefords North Stars	Flin Flon Bombers
2018	Nipawin Hawks	Estevan Bruins
2019	Battlefords North Stars	Melfort Mustangs
2020	Not awarded due to COVID-19 pandemic	
2021	Not awarded due to COVID-19 pandemic	
2022	Estevan Bruins	Flin Flon Bombers
Canterra Seeds Cup
2023	Battlefords North Stars	Flin Flon Bombers
2024	Melfort Mustangs	Flin Flon Bombers
2025	Melfort Mustangs	Weyburn Red Wings
2026	Flin Flon Bombers	Yorkton Terriers

== Timeline of teams ==
- 1968 – Current version of the Saskatchewan Junior Hockey League is founded
- 1968 – Moose Jaw Canucks, Weyburn Red Wings and Regina Pats rejoin league from WCJHL
- 1970 – Regina Pat Blues replace Regina Pats who join WCHL
- 1970 – Melville Millionaires rejoin league
- 1970 – Humboldt Broncos join league
- 1970 – Notre Dame Hounds join league
- 1971 – Estevan Bruins rejoin league
- 1971 – Prince Albert Raiders join league
- 1972 – Yorkton Terriers join league
- 1973 – Battleford Barons join league
- 1974 – Swift Current Broncos join league
- 1976 – Notre Dame Hounds leave league
- 1982 – Prince Albert Raiders leave league to join Western Hockey League
- 1982 – Lloydminster Lancers join league
- 1982 – Regina Pat Blues and Saskatoon J's fold
- 1983 – Swift Current Broncos become Swift Current Indians
- 1983 – Battleford Barons become North Battleford Stars
- 1984 – Moose Jaw Canucks fold to make way for the Western Hockey League franchise Moose Jaw Warriors
- 1984 – Flin Flon Bombers rejoin league as Creighton Bombers
- 1986 – Swift Current Indians fold to make way for the Western Hockey League franchise Swift Current Broncos
- 1986 – Creighton Bombers become the Flin Flon Bombers
- 1986 – Nipawin Hawks join league
- 1987 – Notre Dame Hounds rejoin league
- 1987 – Minot Americans join league
- 1988 – Lloydminster Lancers leave league to join Alberta Junior Hockey League and become the Lloydminster Blazers
- 1988 – Melfort Mustangs join league
- 1991 – Saskatoon Titans join league
- 1993 – Saskatoon Titans relocate to Kindersley and become the Kindersley Klippers
- 1993 – Lebret Eagles join league
- 1994 – Minot Americans become Minot Top Guns
- 1997 – Minot Top Guns relocate to Beardy's 97 aboriginal reserve and become Beardy's Rage
- 1998 – Beardy's Rage relocate to Saskatoon and become Saskatoon Rage
- 1998 – La Ronge Ice Wolves join league
- 1999 – Saskatoon Rage fold
- 2001 – Lebret Eagles fold
- 2025 – Notre Dame Hounds relocate to Warman and become the Warman Wolverines

== See also ==
- List of ice hockey leagues
- Sport in Saskatchewan#Team sports

== Additional reading ==
- Pedersen, Rod (2018). Heart & Soul of the SJHL. Pedersen Media Incorporated. ISBN 9781999529604.
- Solomko, Sherry (April 7, 2024). "North Stars 2016-17 inducted into hall of fame". SaskToday.ca. Harvard Media.
- "EDITORIAL: Changes to NCAA, junior hockey will have lasting impact". Rocky Mountain Outlook. Great West Media. December 2, 2024.
- "Harvard Media wins gold for Yorkton's Save the Terriers campaign". SaskToday.ca. Harvard Media. May 31, 2025.
- Mattes, Austin (June 13, 2025). "Battlefords referee recognized with provincial officiating award". battlefordsNOW. Pattison Media.
- Walchuk, Benny (July 7, 2025). "SJHL's northern division renamed". SaskToday.ca. Harvard Media.
