= Humboldt Broncos =

Junior ice hockey team from Humboldt, Canada

- City: Humboldt, Saskatchewan
- League: SJHL
- Division: Kramer
- Founded: 1970
- Home arena: Elgar Petersen Arena
- Colours: Green, yellow, black and white
- General manager: Brayden Klimosko
- Head coach: Brayden Klimosko
- Website: https://www.humboldtbroncos.com/

The Humboldt Broncos are a Canadian junior "A" ice hockey team from Humboldt, Saskatchewan. Established in 1970, the Broncos play in the Saskatchewan Junior Hockey League. The Broncos have won the SJHL ten times (1972, 1973, 1986, 1987, 1989, 2003, 2007, 2008, 2009, 2012) while winning the ANAVET Cup seven times to advance to the Centennial Cup (the national championship of junior A ice hockey), which they have won on two occasions in 2003 and 2008.

== History ==
The Broncos were established in 1970 by a group of local organizers. The team was originally affiliated with the Swift Current Broncos of the Western Hockey League, who supplied the team with team name, jerseys and some players. They also had a close affiliation that year with St Peter's College in nearby Muenster. The Broncos originally played at the Leo Parker Arena and then move into the new Elgar Petersen Arena since 1980, which has a capacity of 1,800. The team also won the 2003 and 2008 Royal Bank Cup (Canadian Junior A championship). The team's mascot is a horse named SlapShot. The team colours are green, gold black and white.

The Broncos are the most successful team in SJHL history, having won the league championship ten times, the Anavet Cup/Canalta Cup seven times, and the Royal Bank Cup twice.

In very early years under the guidance of Coach Dr. Terry Henning and GM Dr. Gerry Rooney in 1971–72, the Broncos defeated the Melville Millionaires in 5 games to win their first SJHL Championship and then went on to defeat the Dauphin Kings in 6 games to win the Anavet/Canalta Cup (Sk vs Man); eventually losing in 5 games to the Red Deer Rustlers in the Centennial Cup West Final. In 1972–73, the Broncos again were again Saskatchewan provincial Junior A champions. The Broncos were eliminated by Portage La Prairie in the controversial SK-MB cup playoffs.

The Humboldt Broncos won the league championship in 2007, defeating the Melville Millionaires 4 games to 1. The Broncos lost the Anavet Cup to the MJHL's Selkirk Steelers 4 games to 3. Game 7 was won by the Steelers 4–3 in quadruple overtime. Dean Brockman was voted Coach of the Year in 2007, 2008, and 2009.

The Humboldt Broncos won the league/Royal Bank championship twice, in 2003 and as well in 2008, defeating the Kindersley Klippers 4 games to 3. The Broncos won the Anavet Cup defeating the MJHL's Portage Terriers 4 games to 0. The last two games of the series were shutouts for the Broncos. The Broncos won the Royal Bank Cup against the AJHL's Camrose Kodiaks the final score: 1–0.

The Humboldt Broncos won the league championship in 2009 defeating the Melville Millionaires 4 games to 1. The Broncos won the Anavet Cup defeating the Portage Terriers (MJHL) 4 games to 3. The last 2 games were won in overtime at Portage. The Broncos lost in the Royal Bank Cup final by a 2–0 score to the Vernon Vipers BCHL.

The Broncos won the SJHL championship in 2011–12 defeating the Weyburn Red Wings in six games. They went on to beat the Portage Terriers (MJHL) in seven games to win the last Anavet Cup Championship before losing to the Woodstock Slammers (MIJHL) on home ice in the 2012 RBC Cup semi-final 4–3 in overtime.

In 2012–13 the Broncos made it back to the SJHL finals where they lost to the Yorkton Terriers in six games losing 4–3 in the sixth game.

After the 2013–14 season longtime head coach Dean Brockman left the team to take a job as an assistant coach with the Saskatoon Blades of the Western Hockey League. The Broncos eventually hired Ryan Smith (who was the head coach of the Selkirk Steelers of the MJHL) as head coach.

In 2014–15, the Broncos lost to the Weyburn Red Wings in four games in the first round. After the season Smith left the team to take an assistant coaching position with the Swift Current Broncos of the Western Hockey League. The Broncos eventually hired Darcy Haugen (who was the head coach of The Peace River Navigators of the Alberta Junior B League and a former assistant coach with the Estevan Bruins) as head coach.

In 2015–16, the Broncos missed the playoffs for the first time since the 1979–80 season, marking the end of a playoff streak longer than the Detroit Red Wings' then active streak of 25 years.

In 2016–17, the Broncos finished 5th overall in the SJHL Standings but were swept by the Nipawin Hawks in the opening round of the SJHL playoffs.

=== Bus crash ===
In 2018, the Broncos had advanced to the SJHL semi-finals, but were trailing in the series against the Nipawin Hawks by 3–1 heading into Game 5 on April 6. En route to the game, truck driver Jaskirat Singh Sidhu, 36, drove through a stop sign at over 100 km/h, colliding with the Broncos' team bus on Highway 35 near Armley. The local RCMP reported 16 fatalities as a result of the accident, and the game was cancelled. The victims included 10 players, two coaches, a statistician, a broadcaster, the bus driver, and an athletic therapist. The remaining passengers, 13 players, received injuries, most of them serious. The president of the Saskatchewan Junior Hockey League, Bill Chow, has described the incident as tragic, heart-breaking, the league's "worst nightmare."

In December 2018, the Broncos were named the Canadian Newsmaker of the Year by the Canadian Press.

In their first game of the 2018–19 season following the crash, the Broncos lost to the team they had been playing in the finals, the Nipawin Hawks, by a score of 2–1. The game had pre-game and post-game ceremonies for all members involved in the crash. The Broncos qualified for the playoffs that season, but were eliminated in the second round.

The Broncos were in a position to qualify for the playoffs in the 2019–20 season, but the remainder of the season was cancelled due to the COVID-19 pandemic.

== Season-by-season standings ==
The Saskatchewan Junior Hockey League (SJHL) was called the Saskatchewan Amateur Junior Hockey League (SAJHL) until the end of the 1972–73 season.

Season	GP	W	L	T	OTL	GF	GA	P	Results	Playoffs
1970–71	36	22	14	0	-	258	175	44	4th SJHL	Lost to Weyburn in Semi-final
1971–72	44	32	12	0	-	269	169	53 (Note: 1st SJHL. In the 1971–72 season, teams played 1- and 2-point games, with teams playing between 42 and 44 games each. Teams could win a maximum of 8 points against another team during the season, so if they played the other team only 4 times, all games were two-point games, if they played each other 6 times, however, 4 of the games had a value of one point each, the other two games being worth 2 points each. Humboldt, Melville and Prince Albert all ended up with 32–12 records, but Humboldt won more two-point games and as a result ended with 53 points compared to 51 for Melville and Prince Albert.)	1st SJHL	Won League Championship
1972–73	48	29	19	0	-	242	171	58	2nd SJHL North	Won League Championship
1973–74	50	25	24	2	-	259	226	52	4th SJHL North	
1974–75	57	25	30	2	-	281	258	52	5th SJHL North	
1975–76	58	30	25	3	-	272	246	63	3rd SJHL North	
1976–77	60	20	38	2	-	235	325	42	4th SJHL North	
1977–78	60	34	25	1	-	300	269	69	3rd SJHL North	
1978–79	60	31	25	4	-	297	270	66	3rd SJHL North	
1979–80	60	23	37	0	-	275	351	46	4th SJHL North	DNQ
1980–81	60	39	19	2	-	413	291	80	2nd SJHL North	
1981–82	60	30	27	3	-	327	280	63	4th SJHL North	Lost quarter-final
1982–83	64	36	26	2	-	297	235	74	3rd SJHL	Lost 1st round
1983–84	64	23	40	1	-	279	317	47	8th SJHL	Lost 1st round
1984–85	64	35	25	4	-	327	232	74	5th SJHL	Lost quarter-final
1985–86	60	56	4	0	-	469	170	112	1st SJHL	Won League
1986–87	64	55	9	0	-	454	223	110	1st SJHL	Won League, lost in MCC (Sockeyes)
1987–88	60	51	7	2	-	370	178	104	2nd SJHL	
1988–89	64	48	15	1	-	397	270	97	1st SJHL	Won League, won Anavet Cup
1989–90	68	52	14	2	-	352	267	106	1st SJHL	Lost quarter-final
1990–91	68	45	20	3	-	351	267	93	1st SJHL North	Lost final
1991–92	64	37	26	1	-	284	266	75	2nd SJHL North	Lost semi-final
1992–93	64	32	25	7	-	251	251	71	3rd SJHL North	Lost semi-final
1993–94	68	37	25	6	-	273	251	80	3rd SJHL North	Lost quarter-final
1994–95	64	21	35	8	-	236	286	50	5th SJHL North	Lost 1st round
1995–96	64	25	32	7	-	194	220	57	4th SJHL North	Lost quarter-final
1996–97	64	24	32	8	-	202	231	56	5th SJHL North	Lost 1st round
1997–98	64	31	24	9	-	245	242	71	4th SJHL North	Lost 1st round
1998–99	66	35	28	3	-	248	251	73	3rd SJHL North	Lost final
1999-00	60	28	25	7	-	203	224	63	4th SJHL North	Lost semi-final
2000–01	62	29	25	6	6	208	217	66	4th SJHL Dodge	Lost quarter-final
2001–02	64	38	17	5	4	248	184	85	2nd SJHL Sherwood	Lost final
2002–03	60	39	12	6	3	254	191	87	1st SJHL	Won League, won AC, won RBC
2003–04	60	35	14	10	1	214	151	81	1st SJHL	Lost semi-final
2004–05	55	27	23	2	3	176	164	59	4th SJHL Sherwood	Lost quarter-final
2005–06	55	18	28	3	6	146	201	45	5th SJHL Sherwood	Lost 1st round
2006–07	58	41	14	0	3	241	173	85	1st SJHL Itech	Won League, lost Anavet Cup (Selkirk Steelers) 4–3
2007–08	58	48	9	-	1	235	113	97	1st SJHL	Won League, won AC, won RBC
2008–09	56	45	8	-	3	249	130	93	1st SJHL	Won League, won Anavet Cup
2009–10	58	24	26	-	8	160	179	56	9th SJHL	Lost Preliminary (La Ronge Ice Wolves) 3–0
2010–11	58	33	24	-	1	216	198	67	5th SJHL	Lost quarter-final (Melfort Mustangs) 4–2
2011–12	58	42	11	-	5	240	145	89	1st SJHL	Won League, won Anavet Cup
2012–13	54	36	14	-	2	185	120	76	T-1st SJHL	Lost in SJHL Final 2–4 (Yorkton Terriers)
2013–14	56	31	20	-	1	146	132	67	6th SJHL	Lost in 2nd round 1–4 (Yorkton Terriers)
2014–15	56	24	25	-	7	152	163	55	4th of 4 Vittera; 8th of 12 SJHL	Lost Wildcard, 1–3 (Weyburn Red Wings)
2015–16	58	17	36	4	1	165	245	39	4th of 4 Finning; 11th of 12 SJHL	DNQ
2016–17	58	31	25	1	1	178	178	64	2nd of 4 Finning; 5th of 12 SJHL	Lost quarterfinals, 0–4 (Nipawin Hawks)
2017–18	58	33	19	3	3	203	165	72	2nd of 4 Global Ag; 5th of 12 SJHL	Won quarterfinals, 4–1 (Melfort Mustangs); *Semifinals, 1–3 trailing (Nipawin Hawks) (Note: On the way to a semifinal game, the Broncos bus collided with a transport truck, killing 16 people.)
2018–19	58	35	19	3	1	189	177	74	3rd of 4 Finning; 5th of 12 SJHL	Lost quarter-finals, 3–4 (Estevan Bruins)
2019–20	58	28	21	7	2	219	206	65	2nd of 4 Finning; 7th of 12 SJHL	Lost quarter-finals, 0–4 (Flin Flon Bombers)
2020–21	6	5	1	0	0	19	9	10	Cancelled due to COVID-19 Pandemic	
2021–22	58	45	13	0	0	249	128	90	1st of 4 Finning; 2nd of 12 SJHL	Won quarter-finals, 4–2 (La Ronge Ice Wolves); Lost semifinals 1–4 (Flin Flon Bombers)
2022–23	56	40	15	1	0	232	176	81	2nd of 4 Finning; 2nd of 12 SJHL	Won quarter-finals, 4–1 (Nipawin Hawks); Lost Semifinals 1–4 (Flin Flon Bombers)
2023–24	56	37	15	3	1	250	169	78	1st of 4 Nutrien; 3rd of 12 SJHL	Won quarter-finals, 4–3 (Weyburn Red Wings); Lost, Semifinals 3–4 (Melfort Mustangs)
2024–25	56	28	22	3	3	204	172	62	2nd of 4 Nutrien; 7th of 12 SJHL	Lost quarter-finals, 2–4 (Flin Flon Bombers)

=== Playoffs ===
- 1971 Lost final

Humboldt Broncos defeated Saskatoon Olympics 4-games-to-3
Weyburn Red Wings defeated Humboldt Broncos 4-games-to-1

- 1972 Won Provincial League Championship, won Man/Sask championship, lost Centennial West Final/Abbott Cup

Humboldt Broncos defeated Estevan Bruins 4-games-to-none
Humboldt Broncos defeated Saskatoon Olympics 4-games-to-none
Humboldt Broncos defeated Melville Millionaires 4-games-to-1 SAJHL CHAMPIONS
Humboldt Broncos defeated Dauphin Kings (MJHL) 4-games-to-2 MAN/SASK CHAMPIONS
Red Deer Rustlers (AJHL) defeated Humboldt Broncos 4-games-to-1

- 1973 Won League, lost Man/Sask championship

Humboldt Broncos defeated Melville Millionaires 4-games-to-2
Humboldt Broncos defeated Prince Albert Raiders 4-games-to-none
Humboldt Broncos defeated Estevan Bruins 4-games-to-2 SAJHL CHAMPIONS
Portage Terriers (MJHL) defeated Humboldt Broncos 3-games-to-2; Humboldt forfeits due to Portage players' roughhouse physical tactics

- 1974 Lost quarter-final

Prince Albert Raiders defeated Humboldt Broncos 4-games-to-none

- 1975 DNQ
- 1976 Lost quarter-final

Swift Current Broncos defeated Humboldt Broncos 4-games-to-2

- 1977 Lost quarter-final

Prince Albert Raiders defeated Humboldt Broncos 4-games-to-none

- 1978 Lost quarter-final

Swift Current Broncos defeated Humboldt Broncos 4-games-to-none

- 1979 Lost quarter-final

Swift Current Broncos defeated Humboldt Broncos 4-games-to-3

- 1980 DNQ
- 1981 Lost semi-final

Humboldt Broncos defeated Swift Current Broncos 4-games-to-none
Prince Albert Raiders defeated Humboldt Broncos 4-games-to-none

- 1982 Lost quarter-final

Prince Albert Raiders defeated Humboldt Broncos 4-games-to-none

- 1983 Lost quarter-final

Moose Jaw Canucks defeated Humboldt Broncos 4-games-to-none

- 1984 Lost quarter-final

Yorkton Terriers defeated Humboldt Broncos 4-games-to-1

- 1985 Lost semi-final

Humboldt Broncos defeated Swift Current Indians 4-games-to-2
Weyburn Red Wings defeated Humboldt Broncos 4-games-to-none

- 1986 Won League, lost Anavet Cup

Humboldt Broncos defeated Yorkton Terriers 4-games-to-none
Humboldt Broncos defeated Swift Current Indians 4-games-to-none
Humboldt Broncos defeated Estevan Bruins 4-games-to-3 SAJHL CHAMPIONS
Winnipeg South Blues (MJHL) defeated Humboldt Broncos 4-games-to-3

- 1987 Won League, won Anavet Cup, lost Abbott Cup, Hosted 1987 Centennial Cup, lost final

Humboldt Broncos defeated Melville Millionaires 4-games-to-1
Humboldt Broncos defeated Yorkton Terriers 4-games-to-none
Humboldt Broncos defeated Lloydminster Lancers 4-games-to-none SAJHL CHAMPIONS
Humboldt Broncos defeated Selkirk Steelers (MJHL) 4-games-to-none ANAVET CUP CHAMPIONS
Richmond Sockeyes (BCJHL) defeated Humboldt Broncos 4-games-to-3
First in Centennial Cup round robin (3–0)
Richmond Sockeyes (BCJHL) defeated Humboldt Broncos 5–2 in Final

- 1988 Lost semi-final

Humboldt Broncos defeated Estevan Bruins 4-games-to-1
Yorkton Terriers defeated Humboldt Broncos 4-games-to-1

- 1989 Won League, won Anavet Cup, lost Abbott Cup

Humboldt Broncos defeated Estevan Bruins 4-games-to-none
Humboldt Broncos defeated Yorkton Terriers 4-games-to-1
Humboldt Broncos defeated Nipawin Hawks 4-games-to-1 SJHL CHAMPIONS
Humboldt Broncos defeated Winnipeg South Blues (MJHL) 4-games-to-1 ANAVET CUP CHAMPIONS
Vernon Lakers (BCJHL) defeated Humboldt Broncos 4-games-to-2

- 1990 Lost semi-final

Humboldt Broncos defeated Melville Millionaires 4-games-to-1
Yorkton Terriers defeated Humboldt Broncos 4-games-to-2

- 1991 Lost final

Humboldt Broncos defeated Battlefords North Stars 4-games-to-2
Humboldt Broncos defeated Nipawin Hawks 4-games-to-3
Yorkton Terriers defeated Humboldt Broncos 4-games-to-none

- 1992 Lost semi-final

Humboldt Broncos defeated Flin Flon Bombers 4-games-to-1
Melfort Mustangs defeated Humboldt Broncos 4-games-to-2

- 1993 Lost quarter-final

Flin Flon Bombers defeated Humboldt Broncos 4-games-to-1

- 1994 Lost semi-final

Humboldt Broncos defeated Battlefords North Stars 4-games-to-3
Melfort Mustangs defeated Humboldt Broncos 4-games-to-none

- 1995 Lost Preliminary

Kindersley Klippers defeated Humboldt Broncos 2-games-to-1

- 1996 Lost quarter-final

Humboldt Broncos defeated Flin Flon Bombers 2-games-to-none
Melfort Mustangs defeated Humboldt Broncos 4-games-to-none

- 1997 Lost Preliminary

Kindersley Klippers defeated Humboldt Broncos 2-games-to-none

- 1998 Lost Preliminary

Battlefords North Stars defeated Humboldt Broncos 2-games-to-none

- 1999 Lost final

Humboldt Broncos defeated Kindersley Klippers 4-games-to-2
Humboldt Broncos defeated Melfort Mustangs 4-games-to-none
Estevan Bruins defeated Humboldt Broncos 4-games-to-none

- 2000 Lost semi-final

Second in round robin (2–2) vs. Kindersley Klippers and Nipawin Hawks
Humboldt Broncos defeated Flin Flon Bombers 4-games-to-none
Battlefords North Stars defeated Humboldt Broncos 4-games-to-3

- 2001 Lost quarter-final

Flin Flon Bombers defeated Humboldt Broncos 4-games-to-1

- 2002 Lost final

Humboldt Broncos defeated Estevan Bruins 4-games-to-1
Humboldt Broncos defeated Notre Dame Hounds 4-games-to-1
Kindersley Klippers defeated Humboldt Broncos 4-games-to-3

- 2003 Won League, won Anavet Cup, won 2003 Royal Bank Cup

Humboldt Broncos defeated Melfort Mustangs 4-games-to-none
Humboldt Broncos defeated Battlefords North Stars 4-games-to-2
Humboldt Broncos defeated Melville Millionaires 4-games-to-none SJHL CHAMPIONS
Humboldt Broncos defeated OCN Blizzard (MJHL) 4-games-to-1 ANAVET CUP CHAMPIONS
Second in 2003 Royal Bank Cup round robin (2–2)
Humboldt Broncos defeated Wellington Dukes (OPJHL) 3–2 in semi-final
Humboldt Broncos defeated Camrose Kodiaks (AJHL) 3–1 in final ROYAL BANK CUP CHAMPIONS

- 2004 Lost semi-final

Humboldt Broncos defeated Nipawin Hawks 4-games-to-3
Kindersley Klippers defeated Humboldt Broncos 4-games-to-2

- 2005 Lost quarter-final

Humboldt Broncos defeated Weyburn Red Wings 4-games-to-3
Estevan Bruins defeated Humboldt Broncos 4-games-to-none

- 2006 Lost Preliminary

Weyburn Red Wings defeated Humboldt Broncos 4-games-to-2

- 2007 Won League, lost Anavet Cup

First in round robin (2–1–1) vs. Battlefords North Stars and Melfort Mustangs
Humboldt Broncos defeated Melfort Mustangs 4-games-to-3
Humboldt Broncos defeated Nipawin Hawks 4-games-to-2
Humboldt Broncos defeated Melville Millionaires 4-games-to-1 SJHL CHAMPIONS
Selkirk Steelers (MJHL) defeated Humboldt Broncos 4-games-to-3

- 2008 Won League, won Anavet Cup, won 2008 Royal Bank Cup

First in round robin (2–0) vs. Melfort Mustangs and Flin Flon Bombers
Humboldt Broncos defeated Nipawin Hawks 4-games-to-2
Humboldt Broncos defeated Flin Flon Bombers 4-games-to-none
Humboldt Broncos defeated Kindersley Klippers 4-games-to-3 SJHL CHAMPIONS
Humboldt Broncos defeated Portage Terriers (MJHL) 4-games-to-none ANAVET CUP CHAMPIONS
Second in 2008 Royal Bank Cup round robin (2–2)
Humboldt Broncos defeated Cornwall Colts (CJHL) 6–1 in semi-final
Humboldt Broncos defeated Camrose Kodiaks (AJHL) 1–0 in final ROYAL BANK CUP CHAMPIONS

- 2009 Won League, won Anavet Cup, lost 2009 Royal Bank Cup final

Humboldt Broncos defeated Battlefords North Stars 4-games-to-2
Humboldt Broncos defeated Flin Flon Bombers 4-games-to-none
Humboldt Broncos defeated Melville Millionaires 4-games-to-1 SJHL CHAMPIONS
Humboldt Broncos defeated Portage Terriers (MJHL) 4-games-to-3 ANAVET CUP CHAMPIONS
Second in 2009 Royal Bank Cup round robin (2–2)
Humboldt Broncos defeated Victoria Grizzlies (BCHL) 3–2 OT in semi-final
Vernon Vipers (BCHL) defeated Humboldt Broncos 2–0 in final

- 2010 Lost Preliminary

La Ronge Ice Wolves defeated Humboldt Broncos 3-games-to-none

- 2011 Lost quarter-final

Melfort Mustangs defeated Humboldt Broncos 4-games-to-2

- 2012 Won League, won Anavet Cup, lost Royal Bank Cup Semi-final

Humboldt Broncos defeated La Ronge Ice Wolves 4-games-to-0
Humboldt Broncos defeated Battlefords North Stars 4-games-to-2
Humboldt Broncos defeated Weyburn Red Wings 4-games-to-2 SJHL CHAMPIONS
Humboldt Broncos defeated Portage Terriers (MJHL) 4-games-to-3 ANAVET CUP CHAMPIONS
First in 2012 Royal Bank Cup round robin (4–0)
Woodstock Slammers (MHL) defeated Humboldt Broncos 4–3 OT in semi-final

- 2013 Lost final

Humboldt Broncos defeated Melfort Mustangs 4-games-to-1
Humboldt Broncos defeated Flin Flon Bombers 4-games-to-1
Yorkton Terriers defeated Humboldt Broncos 4-games-to-2

- 2014 Lost semi-final

Humboldt Broncos defeated Melfort Mustangs 4-games-to-1
Yorkton Terriers defeated Humboldt Broncos 4-games-to-1

- 2015 Lost Wildcard

Weyburn Red Wings defeated Humboldt Broncos 3-games-to–1

- 2016 DNQ
- 2017 Lost quarter-final

Nipawin Hawks defeated Humboldt Broncos 4-games–to-0

- 2018 see Humboldt Broncos bus crash

Humboldt Broncos defeated Flin Flon Bombers 4-games-to-1
Nipawin Hawks were leading Humboldt Broncos 3-games-to-1 when the fatal Broncos bus crash occurred on April 6, 2018, on their way to Game 5.

== Retired numbers ==
On September 12, 2018, all the uniform numbers of the 29 players/coaches/support staff involved in the April 6, 2018, bus crash were retired by the team.

Humboldt Broncos retired numbers
No.	Player	Position	Career	No. retirement
3	Xavier Labelle	D	2016–2018	September 12, 2018
5	Adam Herold	D	2017–2018	September 12, 2018
7	Stephen Wack	D	2016–2018	September 12, 2018
9	Graysen Cameron	F	2017–2020	September 12, 2018
10	Ryan Straschnitzki	D	2017–2018	September 12, 2018
11	Jacob Leicht	F	2017–2018	September 12, 2018
12	Conner Lukan	F	2017–2018	September 12, 2018
13	Jaxon Joseph	F	2017–2018	September 12, 2018
14	Bryce Fiske	D	2017–2018	September 12, 2018
15	Tyler Smith	F	2017–2018	September 12, 2018
16	Kaleb Dahlgren	F	2017–2018	September 12, 2018
17	Evan Thomas	F	2016–2018	September 12, 2018
18	Logan Hunter	F	2017–2018	September 12, 2018
19	Matthieu Gomercic	F	2016–2018	September 12, 2018
20	Logan Schatz	F	2013–2018	September 12, 2018
21	Nick Shumlanski	F	2017–2018	September 12, 2018
23	Derek Patter	F	2017–2019	September 12, 2018
24	Morgan Gobeil	D	2016–2018	September 12, 2018
26	Brayden Camrud	F	2016–2019	September 12, 2018
27	Logan Boulet	D	2016–2018	September 12, 2018
28	Layne Matechuk	D	2016–2018	September 12, 2018
30	Parker Tobin	G	2017–2018	September 12, 2018
31	Jacob Wassermann	G	2017–2018	September 12, 2018

== NHL alumni ==
- Sheldon Brookbank – Nashville Predators, New Jersey Devils, Anaheim Ducks, Chicago Blackhawks
- Kelly Chase – St. Louis Blues, Hartford Whalers, Toronto Maple Leafs
- Mike Colman – San Jose Sharks
- Curt Giles – Minnesota North Stars, New York Rangers, St. Louis Blues
- Bill McDougall – Detroit Red Wings, Edmonton Oilers, Tampa Bay Lightning
- Terry Ruskowski – Winnipeg Jets, Chicago Blackhawks, Los Angeles Kings, Pittsburgh Penguins, Minnesota North Stars

== See also ==
- List of ice hockey teams in Saskatchewan
- Humboldt Broncos bus crash
- Kids Help Phone

Preceded by Halifax Exports	Royal Bank Cup Champions; 2003	Succeeded by Aurora Tigers
Preceded by Aurora Tigers	Royal Bank Cup Champions; 2008	Succeeded by Vernon Vipers
