= 2020–21 SJHL season =

53rd season of the SJHL

- League: SJHL
- Sport: Ice hockey
- Duration: Cancelled

SJHL seasons
- ← 2019–20 2021–22 →

The 2020–21 SJHL season was the aborted 53rd season of the SJHL. Following the cancellation of the previous season playoffs due to the COVID-19 pandemic, there was some hope that the season would be saved. On 16 October, the league announced that it had been "approved to start play effective immediately". Teams played 3 to 4 pre-season exhibition games each from 22 October to 1 November, and a total of 29 season games were played by all teams between 6—23 November under strict protocols that included limiting the number of spectators to 150, and requiring them to wear masks. However, less than three weeks into the regular season, public health restrictions forced the league to suspend, and eventually abandon, the season. The league officially cancelled the season in March after provincial authorities rejected a proposal to resume the season with additional safety measures.

== See also ==
- Canadian Junior Hockey League
- COVID-19 pandemic in Saskatchewan
- Hockey Canada
- Hockey Saskatchewan
