= 2024–25 SJHL season =

57th season of the Saskatchewan Junior Hockey League

- League: SJHL
- Sport: Ice hockey
- Duration: Regular season September–March; Postseason; March–April
- Games: 336
- Teams: 12
- Total attendance: 253,278
- TV partner: SaskTel maxTV
- Streaming partner: flohockey.tv

2024 Draft
- Top draft pick: Declan Borthwick
- Picked by: Notre Dame Hounds

League championship
- Canterra Seeds Cup: Melfort Mustangs
- Runners-up: Weyburn Red Wings

National championship
- Champions: Calgary Canucks
- Runners-up: Melfort Mustangs

SJHL seasons
- ← 2023–24 2025–26 →

The 2024–25 SJHL season was the 57th season of the Saskatchewan Junior Hockey League. The Melfort Mustangs won the league championship Canterra Seeds Cup and went on to represent the league at the national championship tournament in Calgary where they took second place.

The national governing body, Hockey Canada, and its four western regional affiliates – BC Hockey, Hockey Alberta, Hockey Saskatchewan and Hockey Manitoba – will pilot the Western Canadian Development Model (WCDM). Under the WCDM, junior leagues will adopt most of the Western Hockey League rulebook, excluding some sections, and restrictions on 15-year-old affiliate players in the Western Hockey League will be loosened. Players that will be 18-years of age or older in the calendar year will be allowed to choose whether to use full-face protection or half-face protection, whilst younger players will be required to use full-face protection.

The league announced that it would have two showcase events; the first taking place in November 2024 in Saskatchewan to serve as an "elite identification camp for the upcoming 2024 World Junior A Challenge (WJAC)", and the annual MJHL – SJHL Showcase, which took place in Winnipeg at the end of January 2025. 60 players from each league will be invited and will be divided into three teams; one team of 18 and under players, and two teams of 20 and under players.

Melfort Mustangs head coach, Trevor Blevins, was named Coach of the Year by the CJHL. The award is known as the Darcy Haugan/Mark Cross Memorial Award, named in memory of the 2017–18 Humboldt Broncos head coach and assistant killed in the bus crash in 2018. Blevins was the third straight SJHL coach to win the award, following Mike Reagan of the Flin Flon Bombers in 2024 and Brayden Klimosko with the Battlefords North Stars in 2023.

SJHL referee, Cianna Lieffers, became the first woman to referee at the Hockey Canada national championship in Calgary.

== Regular season ==
Teams played a 56-game regular season schedule, including eight games against the teams in their same division, and four games against the teams in other divisions. The league issued a retroactive decision that four Yorkton Terriers matches were forfeit after they dressed a player in their lineup who had not been officially added to the team's protected player list. The team stated that it would appeal the decision.

Standings
Rank	Team	GP	W	L	OTL	SOL	Pts
1	Melfort Mustangs	56	46	8	0	2	94
2	Flin Flon Bombers	56	38	13	4	1	81
3	Weyburn Red Wings	56	35	19	2	0	72
4	Yorkton Terriers	56	33	21	2	0	68
5	Melville Millionaires	56	31	22	2	1	65
6	Battlefords North Stars	56	29	22	3	2	63
7	Humboldt Broncos	56	28	22	3	3	62
8	Kindersley Klippers	56	25	26	3	2	55
9	La Ronge Ice Wolves	56	24	27	3	2	53
10	Estevan Bruins	56	18	31	5	2	43
11	Nipawin Hawks	56	17	33	3	3	40
12	Notre Dame Hounds	56	12	40	2	2	28

Source: "2024-25 SJHL standings". hockeydb.com.

== Post-season ==
2025 SJHL playoffs
Canterra Seeds Cup

Tournament details
- Dates: 21 March - 27 April
- Teams: 8
- Defending champions: Melfort Mustangs

Final positions
- Champions: Melfort Mustangs
- Runners-up: Weyburn Red Wings
- Semifinalists: Yorkton Terriers; Flin Flon Bombers

Tournament statistics
- Games played: 37
- Goals scored: 205 (5.54 per game)
- Attendance: 47,647 (1,288 per game)

Official website
- 2025 SJHL playoffs

The eight top-ranked teams at the end of the regular season advanced to the playoffs. The first-place Melfort Mustangs won the championship Canterra Seeds Cup, after defeating the Weyburn Red Wings in the final round, and advanced to the 2025 Centennial Cup national championship tournament in Calgary.

Quarterfinals
Melfort Mustangs	4
Kindersley Klippers	1
Yorkton Terriers	4
Melville Millionaires	1
Flin Flon Bombers	4
Humboldt Broncos	2
Weyburn Red Wings	4
Battlefords North Stars	2

Semifinals
Melfort Mustangs	4
Yorkton Terriers	0
Flin Flon Bombers	2
Weyburn Red Wings	4

Finals
Melfort Mustangs	4
Weyburn Red Wings	1

Source: "2024–25 SJHL playoff results". hockeydb.com.

=== Quarterfinal: Melfort Mustangs v. Kindersley Klippers ===
The first-place Melfort Mustangs defeated the sixth-place Kindersley Klippers in five games to advance to the semifinal gainst the Yorkton Terriers.

21 March	Kindersley Klippers	2-5	Melfort Mustangs	Northern Lights Palace	Recap
No scoring		First period	(1) 08:40
00:54 (1)		Second period	(2) 08:58 power play (3) 10:42
power play 08:55 (2)		Third period	(4) 11:11 (5) 18:22 empty net

22 March	Kindersley Klippers	1-6	Melfort Mustangs	Northern Lights Palace	Recap
power play 01:36 (1)		First period	No scoring
No scoring		Second period	(1) 04:25 power play (2) 05:46 (3) 07:04 (4) 11:44 (5) 12:44 power play
No scoring		Third period	(6) 04:10

25 March	Melfort Mustangs	4-3	Kindersley Klippers	Inter Pipeline Arena	Recap
power play 14:49 (1)		First period	(1) 00:54
00:12 (2); 05:53 (3); 06:43 (4)		Second period	(2) 11:08
No scoring		Third period	(3) 18:45

26 March	Melfort Mustangs	2-3	OT	Kindersley Klippers	Inter Pipeline Arena	Recap
power play 15:51 (1)		First period		No scoring
17:59 (2)		Second period		No scoring
No scoring		Third period		(1) 06:16 power play (2) 17:14
No scoring		First overtime period		(3) 05:16

29 March	Kindersley Klippers	2-5	Melfort Mustangs	Northern Lights Palace	Recap
No scoring		First period	(1) 10:09 power play
No scoring		Second period	(2) 06:39
09:34 (1); 16:49 (2)		Third period	(3) 00:33 (4) 05:57 (5) 06:48

Melfort Mustangs win series 4:1

=== Quarterfinal: Yorkton Terriers v. Melville Millionaires ===
The fourth-place Yorkton Terriers defeated the fifth-place Melville Millionaires in five games and advanced to the semifinal against the Melfort Mustangs.

21 March	Melville Millionaires	1-4	Yorkton Terriers	Westland Arena	Recap
power play (1) 09:15		First period	07:06 (1)
No scoring		Second period	05:28 (2); 12:44 (3)
No scoring		Third period	18:43 (4) empty net

23 March	Melville Millionaires	5-6	OT	Yorkton Terriers	Westland Arena	Recap
(1) 02:48 (2) 09:29 (3) 12:58 (4) 18:26		First period		00:13 (1); 16:37 (2)
No scoring		Second period		02:32 (3) power play 07:48 (4) power play
(5) 19:13		Third period		19:56 (5)
No scoring		First overtime period		07:22 (6)

25 March	Yorkton Terriers	2-5	Melville Millionaires	CN Community Centre	Recap
No scoring		First period	04:33 (1)
(1) 18:31		Second period	01:46 (2) power play 06:12 (3) power play 17:53 (4)
(2) 11:41		Third period	19:23 (5)

26 March	Yorkton Terriers	2-1	Melville Millionaires	CN Community Centre	Recap
No scoring		First period	No scoring
power play (1) 08:43		Second period	No scoring
(2) 10:09		Third period	17:51 (1)

28 March	Melville Millionaires	1-2	OT	Yorkton Terriers	Westland Arena	Recap
No scoring		First period		16:03 (1)
No scoring		Second period		No scoring
(1) 18:55		Third period		No scoring
No scoring		First overtime period		15:15 (2)

Yorkton Terriers win series 4:1

=== Quarterfinal: Flin Flon Bombers v. Humboldt Broncos ===
The second-place Flin Flon Bombers defeated the seventh-place Humboldt Broncos in six games and advanced to the semifinal against the Weyburn Red Wings.

21 March	Humboldt Broncos	0-5	Flin Flon Bombers	Whitney Forum	Recap
No scoring		First period	(1) 13:01 (2) 19:28
No scoring		Second period	(3) 09:41 power play
No scoring		Third period	(4) 01:52 (5) 11:46 power play

22 March	Humboldt Broncos	2-4	Flin Flon Bombers	Whitney Forum	Recap
09:43 (1)		First period	No scoring
16:29 (2)		Second period	(1) 01:37 power play (2) 05:58 (3) 15:20 power play
No scoring		Third period	(4) 19:11

25 March	Flin Flon Bombers	2-3	2OT	Humboldt Broncos	Elgar Petersen Arena	Recap
No scoring		First period		No scoring
No scoring		Second period		(1) 05:25 power play (2) 12:51
power play 09:55 (1); 12:51 (2)		Third period		No scoring
No scoring		Second overtime period		(3) 03:44

26 March	Flin Flon Bombers	3-4	OT	Humboldt Broncos	Elgar Petersen Arena	Recap
power play 06:34 (1)		First period		(1) 03:11 (2) 19:47 power play
No scoring		Second period		(3) 12:37 power play
power play 09:31 (2); 10:04 (3)		Third period		No scoring
No scoring		First overtime period		(4) 17:19

29 March	Humboldt Broncos	0-9	Flin Flon Bombers	Whitney Forum	Recap
No scoring		First period	(1) 12:08 shorthanded
No scoring		Second period	(2) 04:12 power play (3) 05:19 (4) 06:35 (5) 09:08
No scoring		Third period	(6) 03:16 power play (7) 11:24 (8) 13:02 (9) 16:50 power play

31 March	Flin Flon Bombers	5-0	Humboldt Broncos	Elgar Petersen Arena	Recap
No scoring		First period	No scoring
01:00 (1); 03:32 (2)		Second period	No scoring
power play 04:03 (3) empty net 16:04 (4); 19:33 (5)		Third period	No scoring

Flin Flon Bombers win series 4:2

=== Quarterfinal: Weyburn Red Wings v. Battlefords North Stars ===
The third-place Weyburn Red Wings defeated the sixth-place Battlefords North Stars in six games and advanced to the semifinal against the Flin Flon Bombers.

21 March	Battlefords North Stars	3-4	Weyburn Red Wings	Crescent Point Place	Recap
penalty shot 10:47 (1)		First period	No scoring
No scoring		Second period	(1) 02:16 power play (2) 10:34 power play (3) 16:48 (4) 19:05
power play 10:57 (1) shorthanded 18:15 (2)		Third period	No scoring

22 March	Battlefords North Stars	5-2	Weyburn Red Wings	Crescent Point Place	Recap
10:24 (1); 13:50 (2); 18:03 (3)		First period	No scoring
05:30 (4)		Second period	(1) 00:57
empty net 18:13 (5)		Third period	(2) 06:20

25 March	Weyburn Red Wings	5-3	Battlefords North Stars	Access Communications Centre	Recap
06:00 (1); 10:11 (2); 15:03 (3)		First period	(1) 04:57 (2) 17:40 power play
No scoring		Second period	(3) 07:26
09:36 (4) power play 09:54 (5)		Third period	No scoring

26 March	Weyburn Red Wings	3-2	OT	Battlefords North Stars	Access Communications Centre	Recap
17:24 (1)		First period		No scoring
12:50 (2)		Second period		(1) 06:18 power play (2) 11:11
No scoring		Third period		No scoring
12:39 (3)		First overtime period		No scoring

29 March	Battlefords North Stars	4-3	OT	Weyburn Red Wings	Crescent Point Place	Recap
No scoring		First period		(1) 15:14
Power play 03:40 (1); 08:49 (2)		Second period		(2) 06:40 (3) 12:27
14:54 (3)		Third period		No scoring
03:27 (4)		First overtime period		No scoring

31 March	Weyburn Red Wings	2-1	Battlefords North Stars	Access Communications Centre	Recap
No scoring		First period	No scoring
13:23 (1)		Second period	No scoring
07:54 (2)		Third period	(1) 18:27

Weyburn Red Wings win series 4:2

=== Semifinal: Melfort Mustangs v. Yorkton Terriers ===
The Melfort Mustangs swept the Yorkton Terriers in four games and advanced to the final against the Weyburn Red Wings.

4 April	Yorkton Terriers	1-6	Melfort Mustangs	Northern Lights Palace	Recap
No score		First period	(1) 09:34 power play
No score		Second period	(2) 00:42 (3) 09:45 (4) 13:14 power play
15:17 (1)		Third period	(5) 00:30 (6) 15:35

5 April	Yorkton Terriers	0-3	Melfort Mustangs	Northern Lights Palace	Recap
No score		First period	(1) 03:59 power play
No score		Second period	(2) 11:54 power play
No score		Third period	(3) 02:19

8 April	Melfort Mustangs	4-3	Yorkton Terriers	Westland Arena	Recap
power play 06:48 (1)		First period	(1) 15:53
00:35 (2); 01:17 (3)		Second period	(2) 02:04
14:07 (4)		Third period	(3) 01:42

9 April	Melfort Mustangs	3-1	Yorkton Terriers	Westland Arena	Recap
No scoring		First period	No scoring
00:52 (1)		Second period	No scoring
penalty shot 09:25 (2); 13:48 (3)		Third period	(1) 04:26 power play

Melfort Mustangs win series 4:0

=== Seminfinal: Flin Flon Bombers v. Weyburn Red Wings ===
The Weyburn Red Wings defeated the Flin Flon Bombers in six games and advanced to the final against the Melfort Mustangs.

4 April	Weyburn Red Wings	3-1	Flin Flon Bombers	Whitney Forum	Recap
00:39 (1); 09:53 (2); 19:03 (3)		First period	No scoring
No scoring		Second period	(1) 02:39
No scoring		Third period	No scoring

5 April	Weyburn Red Wings	4-1	Flin Flon Bombers	Whitney Forum	Recap
07:04 (1); 13:34 (2)		First period	No scoring
power play 12:10 (3)		Second period	No scoring
power play 06:37 (4)		Third period	(1) 16:19 power play

8 April	Flin Flon Bombers	1-4	Weyburn Red Wings	Crescent Point Place	Recap
No scoring		First period	(1) 10:31
No scoring		Second period	(2) 01:45 (3) 02:31
16:50 (1)		Third period	(4) 17:57 empty net

9 April	Flin Flon Bombers	5-1	Weyburn Red Wings	Crescent Point Place	Recap
10:22 (1)		First period	No scoring
03:18 (2); 12:37 (3)		Second period	(1) 14:06
07:05 (4); 12:00 (5)		Third period	No scoring

12 April	Weyburn Red Wings	1-6	Flin Flon Bombers	Whitney Forum	Recap
No scoring		First period	(1) 03:41 (2) 05:50 shorthanded (3) 08:15 power play
power play 03:56 (1)		Second period	(4) 12:57
No scoring		Third period	(5) 08:11 (6) 09:39

14 April	Flin Flon Bombers	2-3	OT	Weyburn Red Wings	Crescent Point Place	Recap
05:40 (1)		First period		No scoring
No scoring		Second period		(1) 09:41 power play (2) 10:30 shorthanded
09:27 (2)		Third period		No scoring
No scoring		First overtime period		(3) 05:08

Weyburn Red Wings win series 4:2

=== Final: Melfort Mustangs v. Weyburn Red Wings ===
The Melfort Mustangs defeated the Weyburn Red Wings in five games to win their second consecutive league championship and advance to the 2025 Centennial Cup national championship tournament in Calgary.

19 April	Weyburn Red Wings	2-1	Melfort Mustangs	Northern Lights Palace	Recap
No scoring		First period	(1) 03:37
shorthanded 16:06 (1)		Second period	No scoring
06:25 (2)		Third period	No scoring

20 April	Weyburn Red Wings	0-3	Melfort Mustangs	Northern Lights Palace	Recap
No scoring		First period	No scoring
No scoring		Second period	(1) 03:17 power play (2) 10:11
No scoring		Third period	(3) 02:04

23 April	Melfort Mustangs	1-0	Weyburn Red Wings	Westland Arena	Recap
No scoring		First period	No scoring
16:07 (1)		Second period	No scoring
No scoring		Third period	No scoring

24 April	Melfort Mustangs	5-1	Weyburn Red Wings	Westland Arena	Recap
05:07 (1)		First period	(1) 16:29
09:34 (2)		Second period	No scoring
power play 10:43 (3) empty net 18:33 (4) empty net 19:53 (5)		Third period	No scoring

27 April	Weyburn Red Wings	0-3	Melfort Mustangs	Northern Lights Palace	Recap
No scoring		First period	No scoring
No scoring		Second period	(1) 08:27 power play
No scoring		Third period	(2) 04:49 (3) 19:02 empty net

Melfort Mustangs win series 4:1

== National championship ==
2025 National championship
Centennial Cup
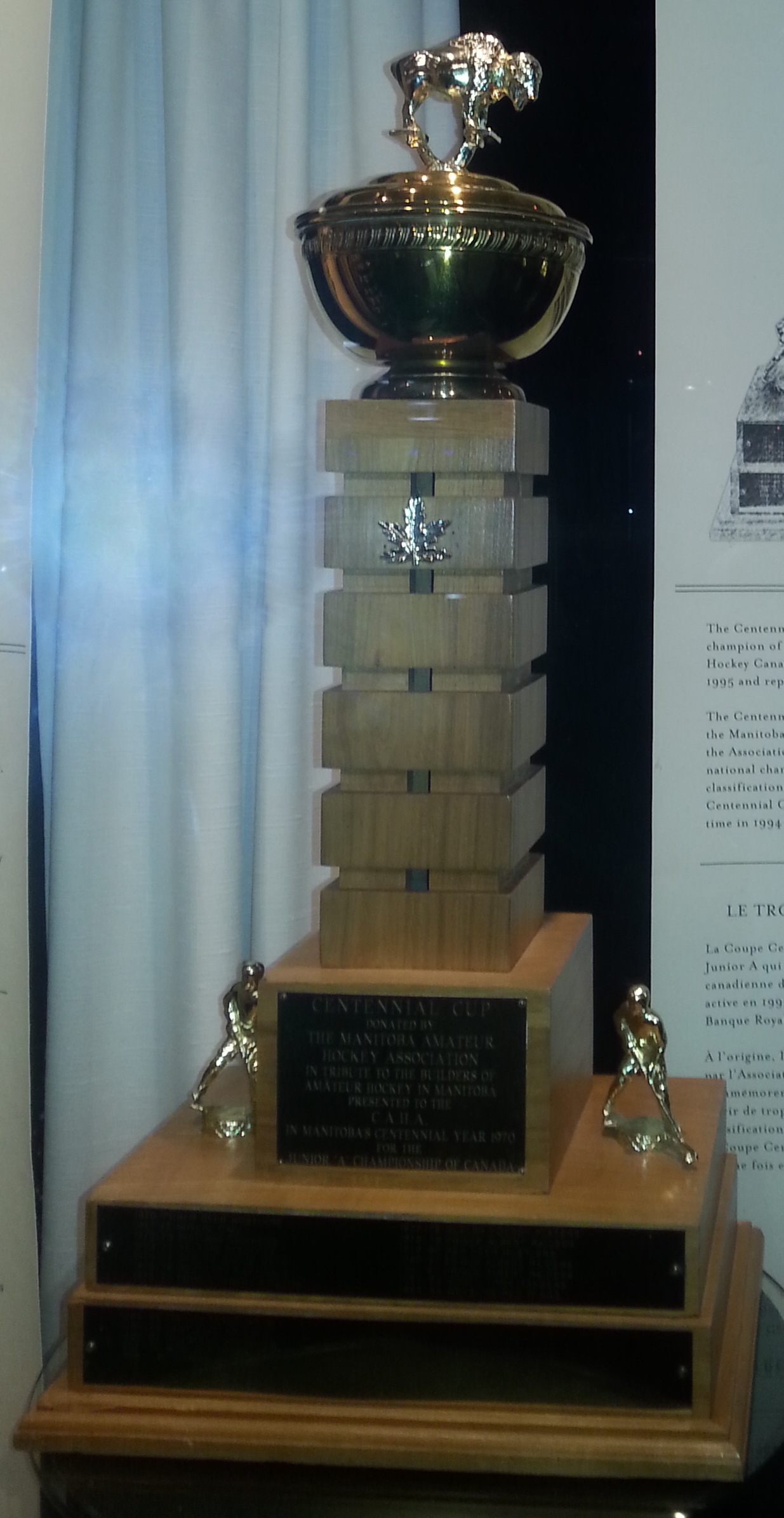

Tournament details
- Cities: Calgary, Alberta
- Venue: Max Bell Centre
- Dates: 8–18 May 2025
- Teams: 10
- Host team: Calgary Canucks

Final positions
- Champions: Calgary Canucks
- Runners-up: Melfort Mustangs
- Semifinalists: Rockland Nationals; Trenton Golden Hawks

Tournament statistics
- Games played: 25
- Goals scored: 189 (7.56 per game)

Awards
- MVP: Anthony Hall

Official website
- Hockey Canada

The 54th annual Junior A national championship tournament was hosted by the Calgary Canucks of the Alberta Junior Hockey League (AJHL) at the Max Bell Centre in Calgary, and included the championship teams from the 9 leagues that collectively make up the Canadian Junior Hockey League (CJHL). The SJHL was represented by the Canterra Seeds championship Melfort Mustangs, who reached the final before losing to the Calgary Canucks of the Alberta Junior Hockey League.

=== Round robin ===
Each team played each other team in their group once during the round robin phase. Three points were awarded for a win in regulation time, two points for a win in overtime or shootout, one point for a loss in overtime or shootout, and no points were awarded for a loss in regulation time.

	Group A	TGH	NMB	GSC	GPS	KRF
1	Trenton Golden Hawks		5-4	5-2	6-2	1-2
2	Northern Manitoba Blizzard	4-5		6-3	6-3	3-2
3	Greater Sudbury Cubs	2-5	3-6		6-2	2-1
4	Grande Prairie Storm	2-6	3-6	2-6		3-1
5	Kam River Fighting Walleye	2-1	2-3	1-2	1-3	

	Group B	CC	MM	RN	EB	VB
1	Calgary Canucks		3-1	2-7	8-2	11-6
2	Melfort Mustangs	1-3		5-2	5-3	5-4
3	Rockland Nationals	7-2	2-5		3-4	9-4
4	Edmunston Blizzard	2-8	3-5	4-3		7-2
5	Valleyfield Braves	6-11	4-5	4-9	2-7	

=== Playoffs ===
Based on the results of the preliminary round robin, the quarterfinals included the Northern Manitoba Blizzard against the Rockland Nationals; and the Melfort Mustangs against the Greater Sudbury Cubs. The Nationals defeated the Blizzard, 4–0, and the Mustangs defeated the Cubs, 7–1.

The Trenton Golden Hawks and the Calgary Canucks, who placed first in their respective groups, had a bye in the quarterfinal round and advanced to the semifinals. The Canucks faced the Nationals, and the Golden Hawks faced the Mustangs. The Canucks had previously lost to the Nationals by a score of 7–2 in the preliminary round. By the 2nd period of the semifinal, the Nationals were winning, 2–0, and by the end of 3rd period, the score was tied, 2-2. The Canucks scored the game-winning goal in overtime to advance to the final.

The final was between the Canucks and the Mustangs. Notably, it was the Mustangs who eliminated the Canucks at the 2024 Centennial Cup in the semifinal, before losing in the final. This time, however, the Canucks defeated the Mustangs, 7–2, to win the championship Centennial Cup.

Quarterfinals
Northern Manitoba Blizzard	0
Rockland Nationals	4
Melfort Mustangs	7
Greater Sudbury Cubs	1

Semifinals
Rockland Nationals	2
Calgary Canucks	3
Trenton Golden Hawks	3
Melfort Mustangs	4

Finals
Calgary Canucks	7
Melfort Mustangs	2

Source: "2025 Centennial Cup schedule & results". hockeycanada.ca. Hockey Canada.

== Awards ==
Matthew Kieper of the Flin Flon Bombers was named the league's most valuable player and goaltender of the year. He finished the season with a goals against average of 1.80 and a save percentage of 0.935.

Jaron Desnoyers, Captain of the Yorkton Terriers, was named the league's forward of the year. Desnoyers had the highest points per game average, with 1.56, or 75 points in 48 games. Desnoyers was also nominated for the league's most valuable player and forward of the year awards.

Nic Andrusiak of the Melfort Mustangs was named the league's defenceman of the year.

Max Chakrabarti of the Weyburn Red Wings, was named the league's rookie of the year. Chakrabarti was also nominated for the defenceman of the year award.

Jadon Iyogun of the Melville Millionaires was named the league's most sportsmanlike player. Iyogun led the Millionaires in scoring and had only two penalty minutes. He also led the league in shorthanded goals.

Trevor Blevins, head coach of the championship Melfort Mustangs, was named the league's coach of the year. He was also named coach of the year by the CJHL. The CJHL coaching award is known as the Darcy Haugan/Mark Cross Memorial Award, named in memory of the 2017–18 Humboldt Broncos head coach and assistant killed in the bus crash in 2018. Blevins was the third straight SJHL coach to win the award, following Mike Reagan of the Flin Flon Bombers in 2024 and Brayden Klimosko with the Battlefords North Stars in 2023.

Rylan Silzer, captain of the La Ronge Ice Wolves, was named the league's player of the year. Silzer was also nominated for the defenceman of the year award.

Reilley Kotai of the Melfort Mustangs was the league's scoring champion, with 39 goals and 38 assists. Kotai was also nominated for the league's most valuable player and forward of the year awards.

== See also ==
- Hockey Saskatchewan
