= Scotty Munro =

Canadian ice hockey coach (1917–1975)

- Born: Roderick Neil Munro; 1917; Swift Current, Saskatchewan, Canada
- Died: September 20, 1975 (aged 57–58)
- Occupation: Ice hockey coach

Roderick Neil "Scotty" Munro (1917 – September 20, 1975) was a Canadian ice hockey coach. Munro was a key part of the group that formed the Western Hockey League (WHL) in 1972, which includes Bill Hunter, Ben Hatskin, and Ed Chynoweth.

== Early life ==
Roderick Neil "Scotty" Munro was born in 1917 in Swift Current, Saskatchewan, Canada. Growing up, he played baseball and hockey for the Moose Jaw Canucks.

== Coaching career ==
After an oil refinery explosion burned his legs and crushed his professional career pursuit, Munro began playing senior hockey in Yorkton and Melville. In 1943, he coached the Moose Jaw Juvenile Falcons all the way to the Saskatchewan Championship Cup, which he won again the following year as coach of the Moose Jaw Monarchs. He then began coaching the junior hockey club Lethbridge Native Sons and Moose Jaw Canucks before joining the Saskatchewan Junior Hockey League (SJHL) as a coach for the Humboldt Indians. During his tenure with the Indians, he led them to three first place finishes in the SJHL before moving them to Estevan, Saskatchewan and renaming them the Estevan Bruins. During this time, he was also longlisted for the Sportsman of the Year Award.

In 1956, Munro was voted in as franchise holder of the Western Canadian Hockey League (WCHL) Medicine Hat Tigers for their first year of Junior "A" Hockey, while still coaching in Estevan and acting as a chief scout in Western Canada. He was suspended for the 1958–59 season due to an incident during a Bruins game against the Moose Jaw Canucks and appointed his wife head coach in his place. He hired Howie Milford to replace him as coach of the Bruins but was forced to take the position in 1961 after Milford resigned to work with the Omaha Knights. During this period, Munro borrowed an idea from the National Football League, placing a microphone and speaker in players' gear. In his first attempt at the coach-player radio communication during a game, the team won. By the 1968–1969 season, the Canadian Amateur Hockey Association deemed the WCHL an "outlaw league" and refused to let them participate in the Memorial Cup; Munro released the Bruins coaching position to Punch McLean and Bill Shinske.

Munro had worked with Bob Brownridge to cofound the junior hockey Calgary Buffaloes in 1966, renamed the Calgary Centennials in 1967 in honour of the Canadian Centennial; after releasing his Estevan Bruins coaching position in 1968, Munro became coach of the Centennials. In 1971, Munro worked with Brownridge to form the Calgary Broncos, an inaugural member of the World Hockey Association. The Broncos participated in the February 1972 WHA General Player Draft, but when Brownridge died, financial issues caused the Broncos franchise to be sold to Nick Mileti, who used the rights to establish the Cleveland Crusaders before the WHA kicked off its first season of play, in October 1972. As owner of the Centennials, Munro refused to allow his players to use curved sticks and asked trainer Bearcat Murray to keep an eye on the players so they would not attempt to curve their own sticks using hot water. In his role as owner, Munro was a key part of the group that formed the Western Hockey League (WHL) in 1972, along with Bill Hunter, Ben Hatskin, and Ed Chynoweth.

Munro died from cancer on September 20, 1975, at the age of 57. In his honour, the WHL awards the Scotty Munro Memorial Trophy to their regular season champion.
