= 2023–24 SJHL season =

56th season of the Saskatchewan Junior Hockey League

- League: SJHL
- Sport: Ice hockey
- Duration: Regular season September-March; Postseason; March-April
- Games: 56
- Teams: 12
- TV partner: SaskTel maxTV
- Streaming partner: flohockey.tv

2023 Draft
- Top draft pick: Preston Baerwald
- Picked by: Melville Millionaires

League championship
- Canterra Seeds Cup: Melfort Mustangs
- Runners-up: Flin Flon Bombers
- Season MVP: Kian Bell

National championship
- Champions: Collingwood Blues
- Runners-up: Melfort Mustangs

SJHL seasons
- ← 2022–23 2024–25 →

The 2023–24 SJHL season was the 56th season of the Saskatchewan Junior Hockey League. The league championship Canterra Seeds Cup was awarded to the Melfort Mustangs, who went on to take 2nd place in the 2024 Centennial Cup national championship tournament in Oakville, Ontario.

== Season highlights ==
The CJHL mandated that players born after 2004 must wear full facial protection when playing. Battlefords North Stars forward Kian Bell became the first player in SJHL history to receive the league MVP award in consecutive years.

== Regular season ==
Teams map, 2023–24 SJHL season
Nutrien Division
Sherwood Division
Viterra Division

Teams played a 56-game regular season schedule, with teams within the same division playing each other 6 times, and 4 times for teams in other divisions.

Nutrien Division
Team	GP	W	L	OTL	SOL	Pts	GF	GA	PIM
Humboldt Broncos	56	37	15	3	1	78	250	169	1376
Battlefords North Stars	56	36	15	4	1	77	254	189	1287
Kindersley Klippers	56	23	26	5	2	53	173	206	1425
Notre Dame Hounds	56	15	39	2	0	32	152	262	1029

Sherwood Division
Team	GP	W	L	OTL	SOL	Pts	GF	GA	PIM
Flin Flon Bombers	56	44	9	2	1	91	244	129	1219
Melfort Mustangs	56	38	14	3	1	80	218	158	1248
Nipawin Hawks	56	22	29	1	4	49	180	194	1399
La Ronge Ice Wolves	56	16	35	3	2	37	161	242	1326

Viterra Division
Team	GP	W	L	OTL	SOL	Pts	GF	GA	PIM
Melville Millionaires	56	32	23	0	1	65	183	179	1212
Weyburn Red Wings	56	26	24	0	6	58	195	213	1610
Estevan Bruins	56	26	26	2	2	56	190	212	1280
Yorkton Terriers	56	21	30	2	3	47	185	232	1350

== Post-season ==
2024 SJHL playoffs
Tournament details
- Dates: 22 March – 30 April
- Teams: 8
- Defending champions: Battlefords North Stars

Final positions
- Champions: Melfort Mustangs
- Runners-up: Flin Flon Bombers

Tournament statistics
- Games played: 37
- Attendance: 48,112 (1,300 per game)

Official website
- 2024 SJHL playoffs

The eight top-ranked teams at the end of the regular season advanced to the playoffs. The Melfort Mustangs were awarded the Canterra Seeds Cup and advanced to the 2024 Centennial Cup national championship tournament in Oakville, Ontario after defeating the 1st-place Flin Flon Bombers in game 6. The Melfort Mustangs were defeated by the Collingwood Blues of the OJHL in the final round of the 2024 Centennial Cup.

Quarterfinals
Flin Flon Bombers	4
Kindersley Klippers	0
Battlefords North Stars	4
Melville Millionaires	0
Melfort Mustangs	4
Estevan Bruins	1
Humboldt Broncos	4
Weyburn Red Wings	3

Semifinals
Flin Flon Bombers	4
Battlefords North Stars	0
Melfort Mustangs	4
Humboldt Broncos	3

Finals
Flin Flon Bombers	2
Melfort Mustangs	4

== See also ==
- Hockey Canada
- Hockey Saskatchewan
