= 1984 in ice hockey =

The following is a chronicle of events during the year 1984 in ice hockey.

== Olympics ==
The men's ice hockey tournament at the 1984 Winter Olympics in Sarajevo, Yugoslavia, was the 15th Olympic Championship. The Soviet Union won its sixth gold medal. Sweden obtained the bronze medal, while Canada finished fourth. Erich Kühnhackl was the leading scorer with 14 points.

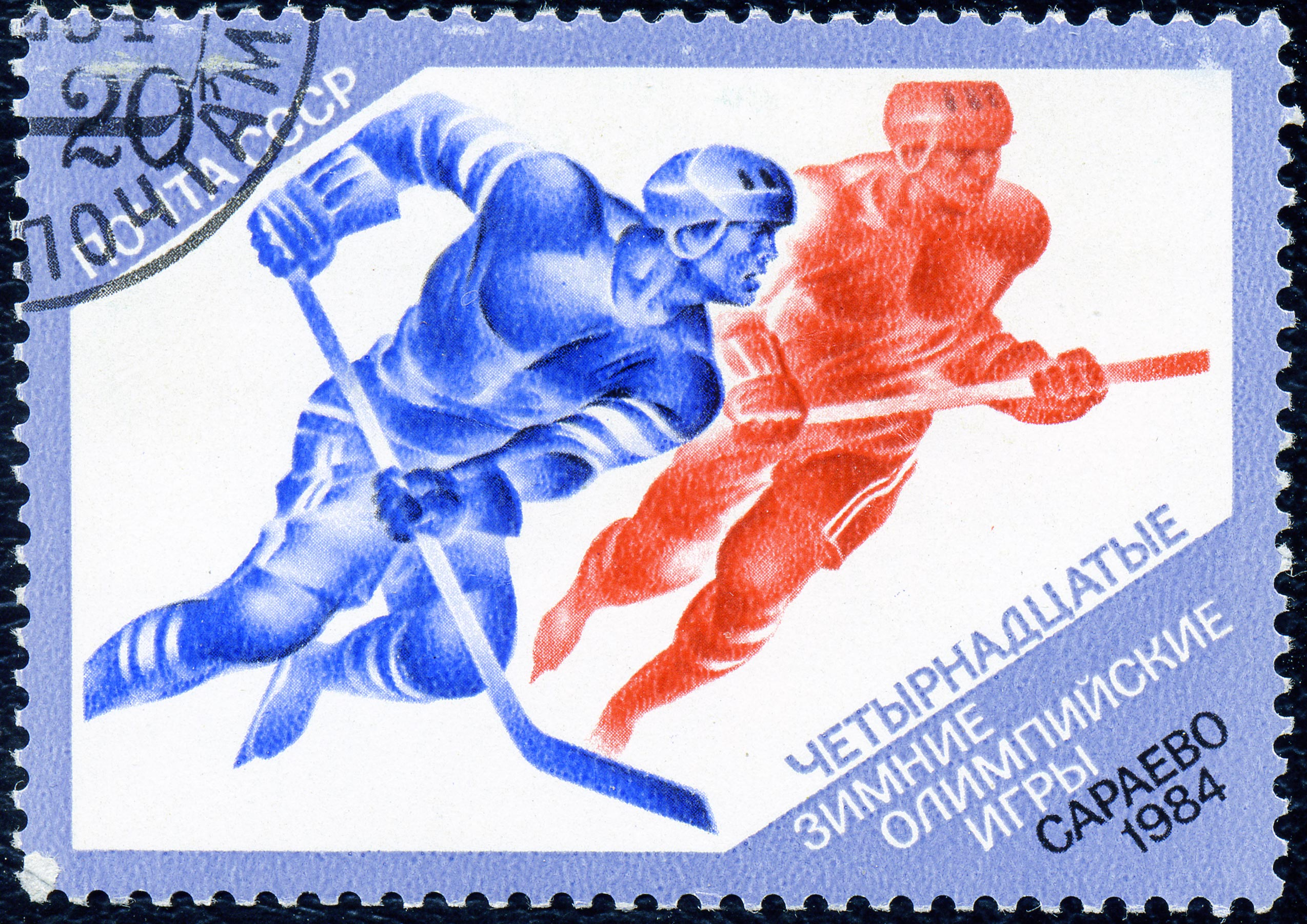

== National Hockey League ==
- Art Ross Trophy as the NHL's leading scorer during the regular season: Wayne Gretzky, Edmonton Oilers
- Hart Memorial Trophy: for the NHL's Most Valuable Player: Wayne Gretzky, Edmonton Oilers
- Stanley Cup - Edmonton Oilers defeat the New York Islanders in the 1984 Stanley Cup Final. Mark Messier was awarded the Conn Smythe Trophy.
- With the first overall pick in the 1984 NHL Amateur Draft, the Pittsburgh Penguins selected Mario Lemieux.

== Canadian Hockey League ==
- Ontario Hockey League: The Ottawa 67s defeated the Kitchener Rangers to win the J. Ross Robertson Cup.
- Quebec Major Junior Hockey League: The Laval Voisins won President's Cup (QMJHL) for the first time in franchise history.
  - Mario Lemieux of the Voisins scored 133 goals and 282 points in 70 games during the regular season.
- Western Hockey League: The Kamloops Blazers won the President's Cup (WHL)
- Memorial Cup: The Kitchener Rangers were the host team for the 1984 Memorial Cup, which was won by the Ottawa 67s. Adam Creighton won the Stafford Smythe Memorial Trophy as Tournament MVP.

== World Hockey Championship ==
  - Men's champion: Olympic year, no tournament
  - Junior Men's champion:

== European hockey ==
- Nations that did not participate in the Sarajevo Olympics ice hockey tournament had an opportunity to compete in the 1984 Thayer Tutt Trophy tournament. Held from March 20–29, 1984 in Briançon, Gap, Grenoble, and Villard-de-Lans, France. East Germany finished first, Switzerland finished second, and Romania finished third.

== Minor League hockey ==
- American Hockey League: The Maine Mariners won the Calder Cup for the third time in franchise history.
- IHL: The Flint Generals won the Turner Cup.

== Junior A hockey ==
- The Orillia Travelways won the Royal Bank Cup.

== University hockey ==
- Tom Kurvers of the Minnesota-Duluth Bulldogs men's ice hockey program won the Hobey Baker Award.

== Births ==
- February 24 - Lukáš Pabiška, Czech professional ice hockey player
- August 10 - David Jones, Canadian former professional ice hockey player

== Season articles ==
1983–84 NHL season	1984–85 NHL season
1983–84 AHL season	1984–85 AHL season
