= 2021–22 SJHL season =

54th season of the SJHL

- League: SJHL
- Sport: Ice hockey
- Duration: Regular season September - March; Postseason; March - May
- Games: 58
- Teams: 12
- Total attendance: 181,147
- TV partner: SaskTel maxTV
- Streaming partner: flohockey.tv

League championship
- Season champions: Estevan Bruins
- Runners-up: Flin Flon Bombers

National championship
- Champions: Brooks Bandits (AJHL)
- Runners-up: Pickering Panthers (OJHL)

SJHL seasons
- ← 2020–21 2022–23 →

The 2021–22 SJHL season was the 54th season of the SJHL. The Estevan Bruins were awarded the league championship Canalta Cup after defeating the Flin Flon Bombers in game 7 of the finals.

The Estevan Bruins and the city of Estevan hosted the 2022 Centennial Cup national championship tournament in May 2022, a decision that was made during the 2019–20 season well before the team's 2021–22 SJHL championship. The Estevan Bruins and the Flin Flon Bombers both competed for the 2022 Centennial Cup under a new 10-team format.

== Season highlights ==
The Estevan Bruins were selected to host the 2022 Centennial Cup national championship tournament with a new 10-team format. The league was also represented by the Flin Flon Bombers despite their having lost to the Estevan Bruins in the final round of the playoffs. Since the Estevan Bruins had a guaranteed berth, the Flin Flon Bombers moved into the slot that would otherwise have been awarded to the league champions.

The league hired Kyle McIntyre as its new commissioner to replace Bill Chow, who resigned after 11 years in the role.

== Regular season ==
Teams map, 2021–22 SJHL season
Global Ag Risk Solutions Division
Sherwood Division
Viterra Division

The league was organized into three divisions with four teams each. Teams played a 58-game regular season schedule, which included ten games between "natural rivals", eight games between other teams in the same division, and four games against teams in the other divisions. The top 8 teams overall, regardless of division, advanced to the post-season.

Standings
Rank	Team	GP	W	L	OTL	SOL	Pts
1	Estevan Bruins	58	43	10	2	3	91
2	Humboldt Broncos	58	45	13	0	0	90
3	Melfort Mustangs	58	34	15	4	5	77
4	Battlefords North Stars	58	35	17	5	1	76
5	Flin Flon Bombers	58	34	21	2	1	71
6	Yorkton Terriers	58	29	22	1	6	65
7	La Ronge Ice Wolves	58	29	24	1	4	63
8	Notre Dame Hounds	58	26	27	3	2	57
9	Kindersley Klippers	58	24	32	1	1	50
10	Melville Millionaires	57	17	30	9	1	44
11	Nipawin Hawks	58	17	35	0	6	40
12	Weyburn Red Wings	57	14	40	3	0	31

== Post-season ==
2022 League championship
Canalta Cup

Tournament details
- Teams: 8

Final positions
- Champions: Estevan Bruins
- Runners-up: Flin Flon Bombers
- Semifinalists: Yorkton Terriers; Humboldt Broncos

Tournament statistics
- Games played: 40
- Goals scored: 237 (5.93 per game)
- Attendance: 48,538 (1,213 per game)

Official website
- SJHL 2022 playoffs

The Estevan Bruins were awarded the league championship Canalta Cup after defeating the Flin Flon Bombers in game 7 of the finals. Both teams then went on to compete in the 2022 Centennial Cup national championships.

Quarterfinals
Estevan Bruins	4
Notre Dame Hounds	1
Melfort Mustangs	3
Yorkton Terriers	4
Humboldt Broncos	4
La Ronge Ice Wolves	2
Battlefords North Stars	2
Flin Flon Bombers	4

Semifinals
Estevan Bruins	4
Yorkton Terriers	0
Humboldt Broncos	1
Flin Flon Bombers	4

Finals
Estevan Bruins	4
Flin Flon Bombers	3

== Centennial Cup ==
2022 National championship
Centennial Cup

Tournament details
- City: Estevan, Saskatchewan
- Venue: Affinity Place
- Dates: 18-20 May 2022
- Teams: 10
- Host team: Estevan Bruins
- Defending champions: Brooks Bandits

Final positions
- Champions: Brooks Bandits
- Runners-up: Pickering Panthers

Tournament statistics
- Games played: 25

Awards
- MVP: Carson Cherepak

Official website
- Hockey Canada

In 2022, the Centennial Cup moved to a 10-team format, including the champions from each of the nine leagues that make up the CJHL, and the host team, thus eliminating the intervening regional contests for the ANAVET Cup, the Fred Page Cup and the Doyle Cup. Since the Estevan Bruins had a guaranteed berth 2022 Centennial Cup as the host team, the qualifying berth normally awarded to the SJHL champions was awarded to the Flin Flon Bombers.

The format consisted of a 4-game round-robin with two groups of five teams, followed by a six-team single-elimination play-off. The Estevan Bruins were eliminated after losing 3 games in the round-robin phase. The Flin Flon Bombers were eliminated by the Pickering Panthers in the first round of the elimination phase.

=== Round robin ===
	Group A	BB	PP	CFL	EB	RLM
1	Brooks Bandits		9-1	5-2	4-0	11-4
2	Pickering Panthers	1-9		3-2	10-5	9-2
3	Collège Français de Longueuil	2-5	2-3		5-3	6-1
4	Estevan Bruins	0-4	5-10	3-5		6-2
5	Red Lake Miners	4-11	2-9	1-6	2-6	

	Group B	DK	SWC	FFB	OJS	ST
1	Dauphin Kings		7-1	1-2	2-1	6-1
2	Summerside Western Capitals	1-7		4-1	4-3	4-1
3	Flin Flon Bombers	2-1	1-4		3-2	6-1
4	Ottawa Jr. Senators	1-2	3-4	2-3		4-0
5	Soo Thunderbirds	1-6	1-4	1-6	0-4	

=== Playoffs ===
Quarterfinals
Pickering Panthers	3
Flin Flon Bombers	2
Summerside Western Capitals	3
Collège Français de Longueuil	4

Semifinals
Pickering Panthers	2
Dauphin Kings	0
Brooks Bandits	11
Collège Français de Longueuil	2

Finals
Pickering Panthers	1
Brooks Bandits	4

== See also ==
- Hockey Canada
- Hockey Saskatchewan
