= Saskatoon Olympics =

Canadian junior ice hockey team

- City: Saskatoon, Saskatchewan
- League: SJHL
- Founded: 1968
- Folded: 1982
- Home arena: Saskatoon Arena
- Colours: Blue and white

Franchise history
- Saskatoon Macs (SJHL) (1968-1969); Saskatoon Olympics (1969–1978); Saskatoon J's (1978-1982)

The Saskatoon Olympics (also known as the Saskatoon Macs and Saskatoon J’s) were a Tier-II Junior "A" team based in Saskatoon, Saskatchewan, who played in the Saskatchewan Junior Hockey League.

== History ==
The Saskatoon Olympics were original members of the Saskatchewan Junior Hockey League when the league was founded in 1968, originally named the Saskatoon Macs. They were eligible for the Memorial Cup playoffs for their first two seasons, then the SJHL was placed at the Tier-II Junior "A" level.

After starting out with two losses in the 1969-70 season, the team won its first game as the 'Olympics' in front of 270 fans on October 21, 1969 over the Moose Jaw Canucks.

The team played at the Saskatoon Arena.

Dave King coached the Olympics from 1975 to 1977.

The team took on the name Saskatoon J's in 1978 before folding in 1982.

Mike Babcock is one notable alumni, playing for the J's in part of the 1980-1981 season along with two games the previous season. Another is Trent Yawney, who played for the J's in the team's final season in 1982, later moving onto the Saskatoon Blades and a career in the National Hockey League as both a player and later a coach. Dale Henry was also on the roster in the team's final season.

== Season-by-season standings ==
Season	GP	W	L	T	OTL	GF	GA	P	Results	Playoffs
1968-69	33	3	30	0	-	112	280	6	4th SJHL	
1969-70	33	6	27	0	-	99	208	12	4th SJHL	
1970-71	36	28	7	1	-	262	153	57	2nd SJHL	
1971-72	44	22	22	0	-	219	183	40	4th SJHL	
1972-73	48	15	33	0	-	237	158	30	5th SJHL North	
1973-74	50	28	21	1	-	261	213	57	3rd SJHL North	
1974-75	58	30	26	2	-	278	275	62	4th SJHL North	
1975-76	58	29	28	1	-	283	278	59	5th SJHL North	
1976-77	60	11	48	1	-	196	394	23	5th SJHL North	
1977-78	60	12	46	2	-	260	434	26	5th SJHL North	
1978-79	60	17	43	0	-	240	388	34	5th SJHL North	
1979-80	60	13	47	0	-	290	414	26	5th SJHL North	DNQ
1980-81	60	12	46	2	-	241	439	26	5th SJHL North	
1981-82	60	33	27	0	-	309	290	66	2nd SJHL North	Lost quarter-final

=== Playoffs ===
- 1969 Lost semi-final

Weyburn Red Wings defeated Saskatoon Olympics 4-games-to-none

- 1970 Lost semi-final

Regina Pats defeated Saskatoon Olympics 4-games-to-1

- 1971 Lost semi-final

Humboldt Broncos defeated Saskatoon Olympics 4-games-to-3

- 1972 Lost semi-final

Saskatoon Olympics defeated Notre Dame Hounds 4-games-to-none
Humboldt Broncos defeated Saskatoon Olympics 4-games-to-none

- 1973 DNQ
- 1974 Lost semi-final

Saskatoon Olympics defeated Yorkton Terriers 4-games-to-1
Prince Albert Raiders defeated Saskatoon Olympics 4-games-to-none

- 1975 Lost quarter-final

Prince Albert Raiders defeated Saskatoon Olympics 4-games-to-1

- 1976 DNQ
- 1977 DNQ
- 1978 DNQ
- 1979 DNQ
- 1980 DNQ
- 1981 DNQ
- 1982 Lost quarter-final

Swift Current Broncos defeated Saskatoon Olympics 4-games-to-2
