= Mark Hartigan =

Canadian ice hockey player

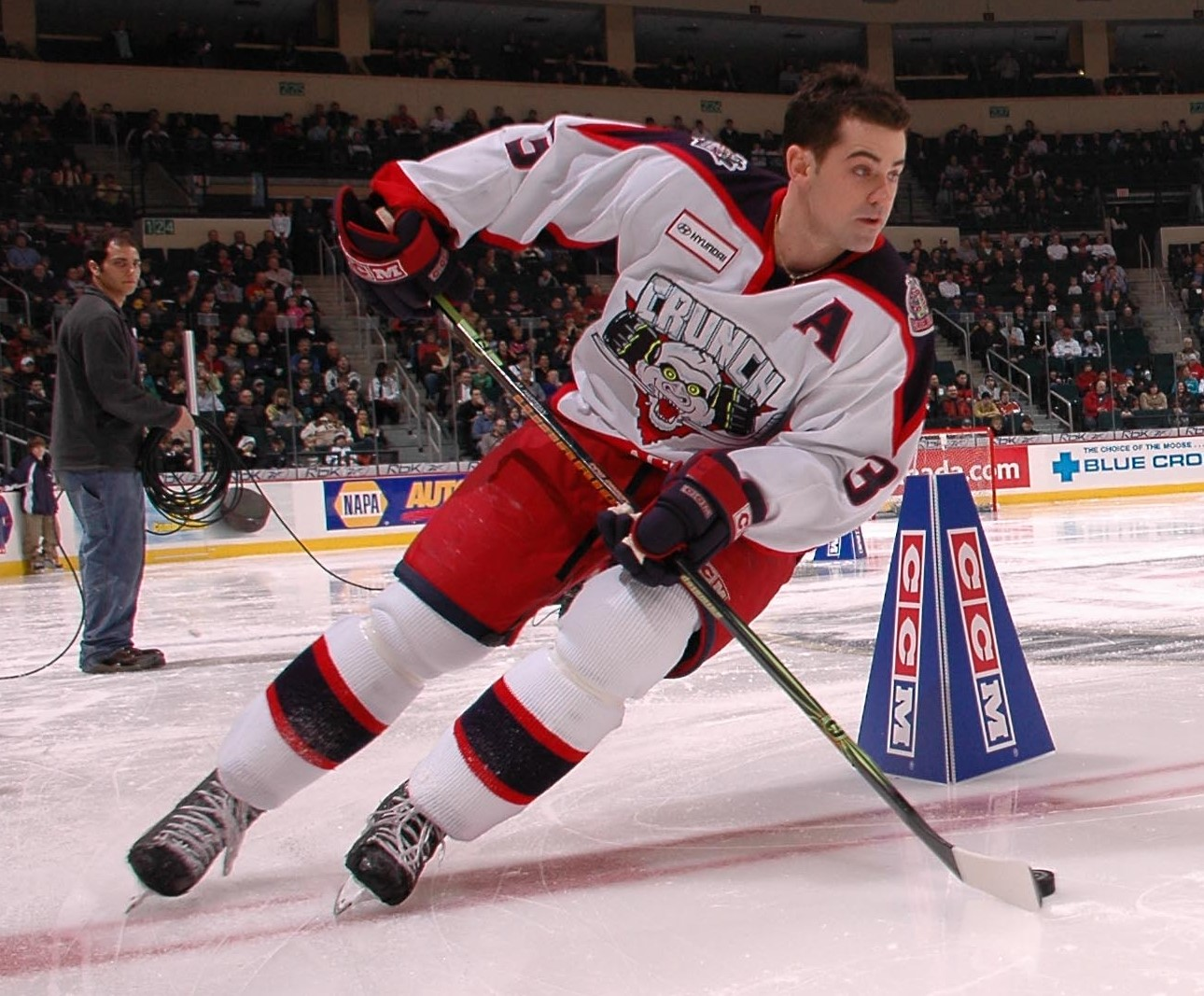
- Hartigan with the Syracuse Crunch in 2006
- Born: October 15, 1977 (age 49) Lethbridge, Alberta, Canada
- Height: 6 ft 1 in (185 cm)
- Weight: 205 lb (93 kg; 14 st 9 lb)
- Position: Centre
- Shot: Left
- Played for: Atlanta Thrashers; Columbus Blue Jackets; Anaheim Ducks; Detroit Red Wings; Dinamo Riga; CSKA Moscow; Rapperswil-Jona Lakers; Linköpings HC
- NHL draft: Undrafted
- Playing career: 2002–2012

Mark Hartigan (born October 15, 1977) is a Canadian former professional ice hockey centre, who played in the National Hockey League with the Atlanta Thrashers, Columbus Blue Jackets, Anaheim Ducks and the Detroit Red Wings. He currently resides in Fort McMurray, Alberta.

== Playing career ==
Hartigan was signed as an undrafted free agent by the Atlanta Thrashers in 2002, after three seasons of NCAA hockey at St. Cloud State University. He first played for Atlanta and the Columbus Blue Jackets at the NHL level, and also saw extensive time with their respective AHL franchises, the Chicago Wolves and Syracuse Crunch.

Hartigan was traded to the Anaheim Ducks along with Joe Motzko in exchange for Zenon Konopka and Curtis Glencross, on January 26, 2007. He played in only 6 regular season games and one playoff game during the Ducks' successful run for the Stanley Cup in 2007, therefore his name was not put on the cup. He was, however, awarded a Stanley Cup ring by the team.

On July 16, 2007, Hartigan was signed as a free agent by the Detroit Red Wings, playing 23 regular season games (3G, 1A), and 4 playoff games. Detroit won the Stanley Cup in 2008. However Hartigan did not play enough games, and again his name was not put on the Stanley Cup. He was, however, again given a Stanley Cup ring by the team.

Hartigan played the last four seasons of his career in Europe, before announcing his retirement after his final season with Linköpings HC in the Swedish Elitserien.

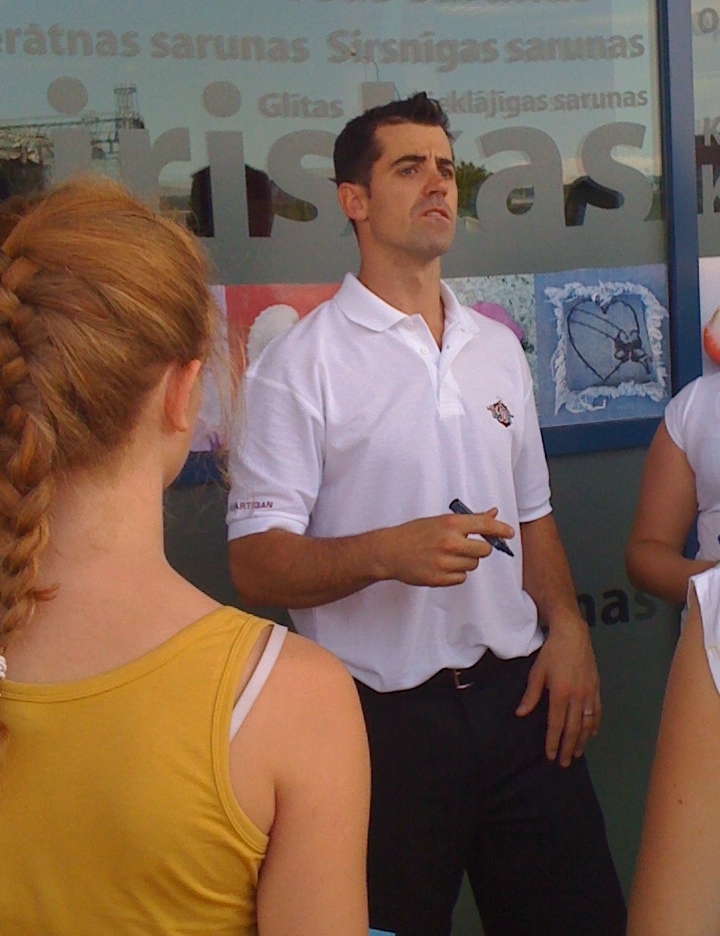
Mark Hartigan with Dinamo Riga fans in 2010

== Records ==
=== St. Cloud State University ===
- Career goals (86)
- Goals in a single period (4)
- Goals in a single season (37)
- Assists in a single season (38–T)
- Points in a single season (75)
- Short-handed goals in a season (6)

=== Syracuse Crunch ===
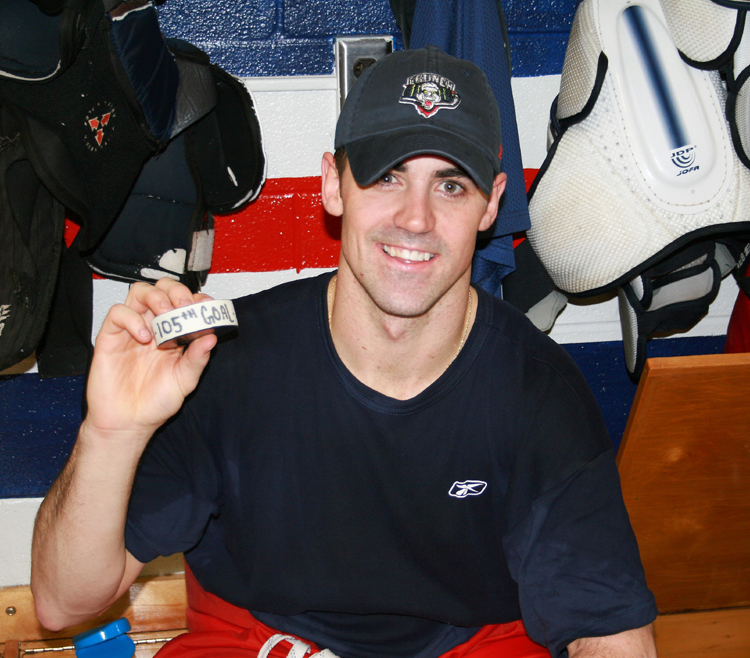
Mark Hartigan with his 105th career goal puck with the Syracuse Crunch. Hartigan's 105th goal as a member of the Syracuse Crunch set a franchise record, passing Lonny Bohonos.

- Passed Lonny Bohonos for the Crunch record for career goals on January 19, 2007 (later surpassed by Alex Barré-Boulet in 2023)
- Longest point streak in franchise history (18 games; December 14, 2005 to February 4, 2006)

== Career statistics ==
			Regular season					Playoffs
Season	Team	League	GP	G	A	Pts	PIM	GP	G	A	Pts	PIM
1995–96	Fort St. John Huskies	RMJHL	44	31	21	52	45	—	—	—	—	—
1995–96	Humboldt Broncos	SJHL	9	0	0	0	0	—	—	—	—	—
1996–97	Weyburn Red Wings	SJHL	52	44	32	76	59	13	12	6	18	29
1997–98	Weyburn Red Wings	SJHL	62	59	46	105	81	16	10	16	26	26
1999–2000	St. Cloud State University	WCHA	37	22	20	42	24	—	—	—	—	—
2000–01	St. Cloud State University	WCHA	40	27	21	48	18	—	—	—	—	—
2001–02	St. Cloud State University	WCHA	42	37	38	75	42	—	—	—	—	—
2001–02	Atlanta Thrashers	NHL	2	0	0	0	2	—	—	—	—	—
2002–03	Atlanta Thrashers	NHL	23	5	2	7	6	—	—	—	—	—
2002–03	Chicago Wolves	AHL	55	15	31	46	43	9	1	2	3	10
2003–04	Columbus Blue Jackets	NHL	9	1	3	4	6	—	—	—	—	—
2003–04	Syracuse Crunch	AHL	69	23	23	46	86	7	1	4	5	8
2004–05	Syracuse Crunch	AHL	69	31	28	59	105	—	—	—	—	—
2005–06	Columbus Blue Jackets	NHL	33	9	3	12	22	—	—	—	—	—
2005–06	Syracuse Crunch	AHL	49	34	41	75	48	6	1	2	3	33
2006–07	Columbus Blue Jackets	NHL	6	1	2	3	2	—	—	—	—	—
2006–07	Syracuse Crunch	AHL	34	19	13	32	51	—	—	—	—	—
2006–07	Anaheim Ducks	NHL	6	0	0	0	4	1	0	0	0	0
2006–07	Portland Pirates	AHL	25	9	16	25	20	—	—	—	—	—
2007–08	Detroit Red Wings	NHL	23	3	1	4	16	4	0	1	1	4
2007–08	Grand Rapids Griffins	AHL	48	23	19	42	76	—	—	—	—	—
2008–09	Dinamo Rīga	KHL	55	20	18	38	115	3	1	0	1	10
2009–10	CSKA Moscow	KHL	48	8	14	22	56	3	0	0	0	4
2010–11	Dinamo Rīga	KHL	45	16	8	24	52	9	3	6	9	12
2011–12	Rapperswil–Jona Lakers	NLA	15	2	3	5	10	—	—	—	—	—
2011–12	Linköpings HC	SEL	23	5	3	8	20	—	—	—	—	—
AHL totals			349	154	171	325	429	22	3	8	11	51
NHL totals			102	19	11	30	58	5	0	1	1	4
KHL totals			148	44	40	84	223	15	4	6	10	26

== Awards and honors ==
Award	Year
SJHL
RBC Top Scorer	1997
RBC Most Valuable Player	1997
College
All-WCHA Third Team	2001
All-WCHA First Team	2002
AHCA West First-Team All-American	2002
Hobey Baker Award (Finalist)	2002

Awards and achievements
Preceded by Jeff Panzer	WCHA Player of the Year; 2001–02	Succeeded by Peter Sejna
