= 2005 Royal Bank Cup =

Tournament details
- Venue(s): Weyburn Colloseum in Weyburn, Saskatchewan
- Dates: May 7, 2005 – May 15, 2005
- Teams: 5

Final positions
- Champions: Weyburn Red Wings (2nd title)
- Runners-up: Camrose Kodiaks

Tournament statistics
- Games played: 13
- Scoring leader: Mathieu Picard (Hawkesbury)

Awards
- MVP: Travis Friedley (Camrose)

The Royal Bank Cup 2005 was the 35th Junior "A" 2005 ice hockey National Championship for the Canadian Junior A Hockey League.

The Royal Bank Cup was competed for by the winners of the Doyle Cup, Anavet Cup, Dudley Hewitt Cup, the Fred Page Cup and a host city.

The tournament was hosted and won by the Weyburn Red Wings in Weyburn, Saskatchewan. Late in the third period of the Final. tied 2-2, the Camrose goaltender attempted to cover the puck but it was poked loose and into the empty net by the Weyburn forechecker, Rick Woods. The goal stood up and ended up being the winning goal.

== The Playoffs ==
Weyburn Red Wings - 2005 Royal Bank Cup Champions

=== Round Robin ===
| Pos | League (Ticket) | Team | Pld | W | L | GF | GA | GD | Qualification |
|---|---|---|---|---|---|---|---|---|---|
| 1 | SJHL (Host) | Weyburn Red Wings | 4 | 3 | 1 | 12 | 9 | +3 | Semi-final |
| 2 | AJHL (Doyle Cup) | Camrose Kodiaks | 4 | 3 | 1 | 12 | 8 | +4 | Semi-final |
| 3 | OPJHL (Dudley Hewitt Cup) | Georgetown Raiders | 4 | 2 | 2 | 13 | 9 | +4 | Semi-final |
| 4 | CJHL (Fred Page Cup) | Hawkesbury Hawks | 4 | 1 | 3 | 10 | 14 | −4 | Semi-final |
| 5 | MJHL (Anavet Cup) | Portage Terriers | 4 | 1 | 3 | 11 | 18 | −7 | |

==== Results ====
Portage Terriers defeat Weyburn Red Wings 2-1 in Double Overtime
Camrose Kodiaks defeat Hawkesbury Hawks 3-2
Weyburn Red Wings defeat Georgetown Raiders 4-3
Camrose Kodiaks defeat Portage Terriers 6-2
Georgetown Raiders defeat Hawkesbury Hawks 3-0
Weyburn Red Wings defeat Camrose Kodiaks 3-1
Georgetown Raiders defeat Portage Terriers 6-3
Weyburn Red Wings defeat Hawkesbury Hawks 4-3 in Overtime
Camrose Kodiaks defeat Georgetown Raiders 2-1
Hawkesbury Hawks defeat Portage Terriers 5-4 in Double Overtime

=== Semi and Finals ===
Semi-finals
1 | Weyburn Red Wings | 4
4 | Hawkesbury Hawks | 3
2 | Camrose Kodiaks | 8
3 | Georgetown Raiders | 2

Royal Bank Cup Finals
1 | Weyburn Red Wings | 3
2 | Camrose Kodiaks | 2

Note: In the semi-final, Weyburn defeated Hawkesbury in Triple Overtime.

== Awards ==
Most Valuable Player: Travis Friedley (Camrose Kodiaks)
Top Scorer: Mathieu Picard (Hawkesbury Hawks)
Most Sportsmanlike Player: Brendon Vertefeuille (Weyburn Red Wings)
Top Goalie: Brenden Cuthbert (Weyburn Red Wings)
Top Forward: Mason Raymond (Camrose Kodiaks)
Top Defenceman: Travis Friedley (Camrose Kodiaks)

== Roll of League Champions ==
AJHL: Camrose Kodiaks
BCHL: Surrey Eagles
CJHL: Hawkesbury Hawks
MJHL: Portage Terriers
MJAHL: Truro Bearcats
NOJHL: North Bay Skyhawks
OPJHL: St. Michael's Buzzers
QJAAAHL: Vaudreuil Mustangs
SJHL: Yorkton Terriers
SIJHL: Fort William North Stars

== See also ==
- Canadian Junior A Hockey League
- Royal Bank Cup
- Anavet Cup
- Doyle Cup
- Dudley Hewitt Cup
- Fred Page Cup
