= 1997 Royal Bank Cup =

Tournament details
- Venue: Summerside, Prince Edward Island
- Dates: May 3, 1997 – May 10, 1997
- Teams: 5

Final positions
- Champions: Summerside Western Capitals (1st title)
- Runners-up: South Surrey Eagles

Tournament statistics
- Games played: 13
- Scoring leader: Mark Hartigan (Weyburn)

Awards
- MVP: Mark Hartigan (Weyburn)

The 1997 Royal Bank Cup was the 27th Junior "A" 1997 ice hockey national championship for the Canadian Junior A Hockey League.

The Royal Bank Cup was competed for by the winners of the Doyle Cup, the Anavet Cup, the Dudley Hewitt Cup, the Fred Page Cup and a host city.

The tournament was hosted by the Summerside Western Capitals and Summerside, Prince Edward Island.

== The Playoffs ==
=== Round Robin ===
| Pos | League (Ticket) | Team | Pld | W | L | GF | GA | GD | Qualification |
|---|---|---|---|---|---|---|---|---|---|
| 1 | SJHL (Anavet Cup) | Weyburn Red Wings | 4 | 3 | 1 | 26 | 10 | +16 | Semi-final |
| 2 | CJHL (Fred Page Cup) | Kanata Valley Lasers | 4 | 3 | 1 | 22 | 22 | 0 | Semi-final |
| 3 | BCHL (Doyle Cup) | South Surrey Eagles | 4 | 3 | 1 | 19 | 15 | +4 | Semi-final |
| 4 | MJAHL (Host) | Summerside Western Capitals | 4 | 1 | 3 | 14 | 19 | −5 | Semi-final |
| 5 | NOJHL (Dudley Hewitt Cup) | Rayside-Balfour Sabrecats | 4 | 0 | 4 | 7 | 22 | −15 | |

==== Results ====
Weyburn Red Wings defeat Kanata Valley Lasers 7-3
Summerside Western Capitals defeat Rayside-Balfour Sabrecats 5-1
South Surrey Eagles defeat Rayside-Balfour Sabrecats 5-2
Kanata Valley Lasers defeat Summerside Western Capitals 7-5
Weyburn Red Wings defeat Summerside Western Capitals 8-2
Kanata Valley Lasers defeat Rayside-Balfour Sabrecats 5-4
South Surrey Eagles defeat Weyburn Red Wings 5-4 in Overtime for the Abbott Cup
South Surrey Eagles defeat Summerside Western Capitals 3-2 in Overtime
Weyburn Red Wings defeat Rayside-Balfour Sabrecats 7-0
Kanata Valley Lasers defeat South Surrey Eagles 7-6

=== Semi-finals and Final ===
Semi-finals
1 | Weyburn Red Wings | 3
4 | Summerside Western Capitals | 4
2 | Kanata Valley Lasers | 2
3 | South Surrey Eagles | 4

Royal Bank Cup Finals
3 | South Surrey Eagles | 3
4 | Summerside Western Capitals | 4

Note: Summerside defeated Weyburn in Overtime.

== Awards ==
Most Valuable Player: Mark Hartigan (Weyburn Red Wings)
Top Scorer: Mark Hartigan (Weyburn Red Wings)
Most Sportsmanlike Player: Ryan Jardine (Kanata Valley Lasers)
Top Goalie: Geoff Derouin (Weyburn Red Wings)
Top Forward: Scott Gomez (South Surrey Eagles)
Top Defenceman: Jakub Ficenec (South Surrey Eagles)

== Roll of League Champions ==
AJHL: Fort McMurray Oil Barons
BCHL: South Surrey Eagles
CJHL: Kanata Valley Lasers
MJHL: St. James Canadians
MJAHL: Summerside Western Capitals
NOJHL: Rayside-Balfour Sabrecats
OPJHL: Milton Merchants
QPJHL: Longueuil Collège Français
RMJHL: Cranbrook Colts
SJHL: Weyburn Red Wings

== See also ==
- Canadian Junior A Hockey League
- Royal Bank Cup
- Anavet Cup
- Doyle Cup
- Dudley Hewitt Cup
- Fred Page Cup
- Abbott Cup
- Mowat Cup
