= Weyburn Red Wings =

Junior hockey club

- City: Weyburn
- League: SJHL
- Division: Viterra
- Founded: 1968
- Home arena: Whitecap Resources Centre
- Colours
- General manager: Cody Mapes
- Head coach: Cody Mapes
- Website: weyburnredwings.ca

Championships
- League: 1970; 1971; 1984; 1994; 1995; 1997; 1998; 2001
- Regional: 1970; 1984; 1994; 1997; 1998; 2001
- National: 1984; 2005

The Weyburn Red Wings are a Canadian junior ice hockey club and franchise of the Saskatchewan Junior Hockey League (SJHL). The team plays its home games at the Whitecap Resources Centre in Weyburn.

== History ==
The team began play in 1961, in the Saskatchewan Junior Hockey League, and was named after the NHL's Detroit Red Wings. The team was one of the founding members of the Western Hockey League in 1966, but left in 1968 to return to the SJHL. Increasing travel costs of playing in the Western Hockey League was the main reason for moving back to the SJHL.

The team is the most successful in the league in terms of league championships won. They have won eight SJHL championships, winning in 1970, 1971, 1984, 1994, 1995, 1997, 1998, and 2001.

The Red Wings won the Abbott Cup in 1970, making them the Junior "A" Champion for Western Canada and earning a playoff against the George Richardson Memorial Trophy winning Eastern Champion for the Memorial Cup. The Red Wings lost the Memorial Cup competition against the Montreal Junior Canadiens.

The Red Wings won national championships in 1984 and 2005.

Statistics
Season	GP	W	L	T	OTL	GF	GA	Pts	Regular season	Post-season
1961–62	55	18	30	7	-	165	185	43	7th SJHL	Did not qualify
1962–63	54	28	20	6	-	195	169	62	3rd SJHL	Lost semi-final
1963–64	62	26	27	9	-	242	261	61	4th SJHL	Lost quarter-final
1964–65	56	36	17	3	-	286	206	75	2nd SJHL	Lost final
1965–66	60	38	16	6	-	300	183	82	2nd SJHL	Lost final
1966–67	56	16	30	10	-	214	269	42	6th WCJHL	Lost 1st round
1967–68	60	15	40	5	-	218	311	35	11th WCJHL	Did not qualify
1968–69	43	25	17	1	-	234	184	50	2nd SJHL	
1969–70	36	25	8	3	-	181	125	53	1st SJHL	Won league
1970–71	36	30	6	0	-	278	117	60	1st SJHL	Won league
1971–72	60	27	33	0	-	266	292	34	7th SJHL	
1972–73	48	36	12	0	-	253	168	72	1st SJHL	
1973–74	50	31	18	1	-	212	146	63	3rd SJHL South	
1974–75	58	39	17	2	-	286	184	80	3rd SJHL South	
1975–76	58	42	15	1	-	296	190	85	1st SJHL South	
1976–77	60	46	14	0	-	335	191	92	1st SJHL	
1977–78	60	29	29	2	-	267	299	60	4th SJHL South	
1978–79	60	28	30	2	-	239	283	58	4th SJHL South	
1979–80	60	24	33	3	-	279	324	51	5th SJHL South	Lost 1st round
1980–81	60	27	31	2	-	296	298	56	4th SJHL South	
1981–82	60	25	33	2	-	222	261	54	3rd SJHL South	Lost semi-final
1982–83	64	53	9	2	-	385	184	108	1st SJHL	Lost final
1983–84	64	40	23	1	-	308	266	81	2nd SJHL	Won league, won AC, won CC
1984–85	64	45	14	5	-	328	216	95	1st SJHL	Lost final
1985–86	60	23	35	2	-	273	307	48	7th SJHL	
1986–87	64	25	38	1	-	258	288	51	7th SJHL	Lost 1st round
1987–88	60	25	34	1	-	257	308	51	7th SJHL	
1988–89	64	22	26	4	-	292	372	46	6th SJHL South	
1989–90	68	43	18	7	-	360	271	93	1st SJHL South	Lost quarter-final
1990–91	68	39	27	2	-	329	269	80	3rd SJHL South	Lost semi-final
1991–92	64	38	20	6	-	305	273	82	2nd SJHL South	Lost quarter-final
1992–93	64	26	30	8	-	277	284	60	4th SJHL South	Lost quarter-final
1993–94	68	42	16	10	-	317	223	94	1st SJHL	Won league, won AC
1994–95	64	33	26	5	-	302	249	71	3rd SJHL South	Won league
1995–96	64	25	29	10	-	256	257	60	4th SJHL South	Lost 1st round
1996–97	64	45	13	6	-	336	199	96	1st SJHL	Won league, won AC
1997–98	64	31	24	9	-	277	218	71	2nd SJHL South	Won league, won AC
1998–99	66	27	36	3	-	220	253	57	6th SJHL South	Did not qualify
1999–00	60	34	21	5	-	247	209	73	2nd SJHL South	Lost final
2000–01	62	41	17	2	2	274	185	86	1st SJHL Sherwood	Won league, won AC
2001–02	64	23	30	5	6	222	255	57	4th SJHL Sherwood	Lost quarter-final
2002–03	60	29	25	4	2	209	215	64	3rd SJHL Sherwood	Lost quarter-final
2003–04	60	34	19	5	2	228	185	75	2nd SJHL Sherwood	Lost final
2004–05	55	18	27	8	2	142	166	46	5th SJHL Sherwood	Lost 1st round, won RBC as host
2005–06	55	25	23	4	3	144	146	57	4th SJHL Sherwood	Lost quarter-final
2006–07	58	24	26	0	8	173	200	56	5th SJHL Sherwood	Lost quarter-final
2007–08	58	36	14	-	8	196	164	80	1st SJHL Sherwood	Lost quarter-final
2008-09	56	38	16	-	2	222	180	78	1st SJHL Sherwood	Lost Sherwood final
2009-10	58	39	13	-	6	193	152	84	1st SJHL Sherwood	Lost quarter-final
2010-11	58	30	24	-	4	193	191	64	3rd SJHL Sherwood	Lost quarter-final
2011-12	58	37	19	-	2	222	180	76	1st SJHL Sherwood	Lost league final
2012-13	54	16	35	-	3	149	213	35	6th SJHL Sherwood	Did not qualify
2013-14	56	21	28	-	7	152	176	49	4th SJHL Viterra	Did not qualify
2014-15	56	21	24	7	4	145	169	53	2nd of 4 Viterra; 9th of 12 SJHL	Won wildcard, 2-3 (Broncos); Lost quarter-finals, 1-4 (Mustangs)
2015-16	58	35	14	5	4	182	139	79	1st of 4 Viterra; 3rd of 12 SJHL	Lost quarter-finals, 1-4 (Bombers)
2016-17	58	25	26	3	4	171	177	57	3rd of 4 Viterra; 8th of 12 SJHL	Won wildcard, 3-0 (Klippers); Lost quarter-final, 0-4 (North Stars)
2017–18	58	29	23	5	1	183	183	64	2nd in division 7th overall	Won first round against Melville (2:1); Lost quarterfinal against Battlefords (4:0)
2018–19	58	18	34	0	6	160	245	42	3rd in division 10th overall	Lost first round against Flin Flon (2:0)
2019–20	58	20	35	0	1	118	193	43	3rd in division 11th overall	Did not qualify
2020–21	5	0	3	-	2	9	21	2	Season cancelled	
2021–22	57	14	40	-	3	128	246	31	4th in division 12th overall	Did not qualify
2022–23	56	26	27	0	2	181	186	55	2nd in division 8th overall	Lost quarterfinal against Battlefords (4:0)
2023–24	56	26	24	0	6	195	213	58	2nd in division 6th overall	Lost quarterfinal against Humboldt (4:3)
2024–25	56	35	19	0	2	218	166	72	1st in division 3rd overall	Won quarterfinal against Battlefords (4:2); Won semifinal against Flin Flon (4:2); Lost final against Melfort (4:1)
2025–26	56	34	18	0	4	216	187	72	2nd in division 5th overall	Won quarterfinal against Nipawin (4:2); Lost semifinal against Flin Flon (4:3)

Source: "Weyburn Red Wings hockey team statistics and history". hockeydb.com.

=== Playoffs ===
- 1969 Lost final

Weyburn Red Wings defeated Saskatoon Olympics 4-games-to-none
Regina Pats defeated Weyburn Red Wings 4-games-to-1

- 1970 Won league, won Abbott Cup, lost 1970 Memorial Cup final

Weyburn Red Wings defeated Moose Jaw Canucks 4-games-to-none
Weyburn Red Wings defeated Regina Pats 4-games-to-2 SAJHL champions
Weyburn Red Wings defeated Red Deer Rustlers (AJHL) 4-games-to-2
Weyburn Red Wings defeated Fort William Hurricanes (TBJHL) 4-games-to-2 Abbott Cup champions
Montreal Jr. Canadiens (OHA) defeated Weyburn Red Wings 4-games-to-none

- 1971 Won league, lost Man/Sask championship

Weyburn Red Wings defeated Melville Millionaires 4-games-to-2
Weyburn Red Wings defeated Humboldt Broncos 4-games-to-1 SAJHL champions
St. Boniface Saints (MJHL) defeated Weyburn Red Wings 4-games-to-2

- 1972 Lost quarter-final

Prince Albert Raiders defeated Weyburn Red Wings 4-games-to-2

- 1973 Lost semi-final

Weyburn Red Wings defeated Moose Jaw Canucks 4-games-to-1
Estevan Bruins defeated Weyburn Red Wings 4-games-to-1

- 1974 Lost semi-final

Weyburn Red Wings defeated Regina Blues 4-games-to-1
Estevan Bruins defeated Weyburn Red Wings 4-games-to-1

- 1975 Lost semi-final

Weyburn Red Wings defeated Estevan Bruins 4-games-to-3
Swift Current Broncos defeated Weyburn Red Wings 4-games-to-1

- 1976 Lost final

Weyburn Red Wings defeated Regina Blues 4-games-to-1
Weyburn Red Wings defeated Melville Millionaires 4-games-to-2
Prince Albert Raiders defeated Weyburn Red Wings 4-games-to-none

- 1977 Lost semi-final

Weyburn Red Wings defeated Regina Blues 4-games-to-2
Melville Millionaires defeated Weyburn Red Wings 4-games-to-1

- 1978 Lost quarter-final

Moose Jaw Canucks defeated Weyburn Red Wings 4-games-to-1

- 1979 Lost quarter-final

Melville Millionaires defeated Weyburn Red Wings 4-games-to-3

- 1980 Lost quarter-final

Prince Albert Raiders defeated Weyburn Red Wings 4-games-to-1

- 1981 Lost quarter-final

Moose Jaw Canucks defeated Weyburn Red Wings 4-games-to-1

- 1982 Lost semi-final

Weyburn Red Wings defeated Moose Jaw Canucks 4-games-to-2
Yorkton Terriers defeated Weyburn Red Wings 4-games-to-3

- 1983 Lost final

Weyburn Red Wings defeated Lloydminster Lancers 4-games-to-none
Weyburn Red Wings defeated Moose Jaw Canucks 4-games-to-3
Yorkton Terriers defeated Weyburn Red Wings 4-games-to-3

- 1984 Won league, won Anavet Cup, won Abbott Cup, won 1984 Centennial Cup

Weyburn Red Wings defeated Battlefords North Stars 4-games-to-none
Weyburn Red Wings defeated Melville Millionaires 4-games-to-3
Weyburn Red Wings defeated Yorkton Terriers 4-games-to-1 SAJHL champions
Weyburn Red Wings defeated Selkirk Steelers (MJHL) 4-games-to-2 Anavet Cup champions
Weyburn Red Wings defeated Langley Eagles (BCJHL) 4-games-to-none Abbott Cup champions
Weyburn Red Wings defeated Orillia Travelways (OJHL) 4-games-to-3 Centennial Cup champions

- 1985 Lost final

Weyburn Red Wings defeated Creighton Bombers 4-games-to-none
Weyburn Red Wings defeated Humboldt Broncos 4-games-to-none
Estevan Bruins defeated Weyburn Red Wings 4-games-to-3

- 1986 Lost semi-final

Weyburn Red Wings defeated Lloydminster Lancers 4-games-to-3
Estevan Bruins defeated Weyburn Red Wings 4-games-to-none

- 1987 Lost quarter-final

Battlefords North Stars defeated Weyburn Red Wings 4-games-to-2

- 1988 Lost quarter-final

Notre Dame Hounds defeated Weyburn Red Wings 4-games-to-none

- 1989 Did not qualify
- 1990 Lost semi-final

Weyburn Red Wings defeated Estevan Bruins 4-games-to-2
Nipawin Hawks defeated Weyburn Red Wings 4-games-to-3

- 1991 Lost semi-final

Weyburn Red Wings defeated Melville Millionaires 4-games-to-3
Yorkton Terriers defeated Weyburn Red Wings 4-games-to-1

- 1992 Lost quarter-final

Melville Millionaires defeated Weyburn Red Wings 4-games-to-2

- 1993 Lost quarter-final

Melville Millionaires defeated Weyburn Red Wings 4-games-to-none

- 1994 Won league, won Anavet Cup, lost 1994 Centennial Cup semi-final

Weyburn Red Wings defeated Notre Dame Hounds 4-games-to-1
Weyburn Red Wings defeated Melville Millionaires 4-games-to-2
Weyburn Red Wings defeated Melfort Mustangs 4-games-to-2 SJHL champions
Weyburn Red Wings defeated St. Boniface Saints (MJHL) 4-games-to-3 Anavet Cup champions
Fourth in 1994 Centennial Cup round robin (1-3)
Olds Grizzlys (AJHL) defeated Weyburn Red Wings 4-3 in semi-final

- 1995 Won league, lost Anavet Cup

Weyburn Red Wings defeated Yorkton Terriers 4-games-to-3
Weyburn Red Wings defeated Lebret Eagles 4-games-to-none
Weyburn Red Wings defeated Battlefords North Stars 4-games-to-1 SJHL champions
Winnipeg South Blues (MJHL) defeated Weyburn Red Wings 4-games-to-2

- 1996 Lost preliminary

Notre Dame Hounds defeated Weyburn Red Wings 2-games-to-1

- 1997 Won league, won Anavet Cup, lost 1997 Royal Bank Cup semi-final

Weyburn Red Wings defeated Estevan Bruins 4-games-to-none
Weyburn Red Wings defeated Lebret Eagles 4-games-to-1
Weyburn Red Wings defeated Battlefords North Stars 4-games-to-none SJHL champions
Weyburn Red Wings defeated St. James Canadians (MJHL) 4-games-to-1 Anavet Cup champions
First in 1997 Royal Bank Cup round robin (3-1)
Summerside Western Capitals (MJAHL) defeated Weyburn Red Wings 4-3 OT in semi-final

- 1998 Won league, won Anavet Cup, lost 1998 Royal Bank Cup final

Weyburn Red Wings defeated Estevan Bruins 4-games-to-1
Weyburn Red Wings defeated Lebret Eagles 4-games-to-3
Weyburn Red Wings defeated Nipawin Hawks 4-games-to-1 SJHL champions
Weyburn Red Wings defeated Winkler Flyers (MJHL) 4-games-to-3 Anavet Cup champions
Third in 1998 Royal Bank Cup round robin (2-2)
Weyburn Red Wings defeated Nanaimo Clippers (BCHL) 4-1 in semi-final
South Surrey Eagles (BCHL) defeated Weyburn Red Wings 4-1 in final

- 1999 Did not qualify
- 2000 Lost final

Second in round robin (2-2) vs. Estevan Bruins and Yorkton Terriers
Weyburn Red Wings defeated Notre Dame Hounds 4-games-to-2
Weyburn Red Wings defeated Melville Millionaires 4-games-to-2
Battlefords North Stars defeated Weyburn Red Wings 4-games-to-3

- 2001 Won league, won Anavet Cup, lost 2001 Royal Bank Cup semi-final

Weyburn Red Wings defeated Notre Dame Hounds 4-games-to-none
Weyburn Red Wings defeated Lebret Eagles 4-games-to-1
Weyburn Red Wings defeated Nipawin Hawks 4-games-to-2 SJHL champions
Weyburn Red Wings defeated OCN Blizzard (MJHL) 4-games-to-2 Anavet Cup champions
Second in 2007 Royal Bank Cup round robin
Flin Flon Bombers defeated Weyburn Red Wings 4-0 in semi-final

- 2002 Lost quarter-final

Notre Dame Hounds defeated Weyburn Red Wings 4-games-to-2

- 2003 Lost quarter-final

Yorkton Terriers defeated Weyburn Red Wings 4-games-to-2

- 2004 Lost final

Weyburn Red Wings defeated Notre Dame Hounds 4-games-to-1
Weyburn Red Wings defeated Yorkton Terriers 4-games-to-2
Kindersley Klippers defeated Weyburn Red Wings 4-games-to-2

- 2005 Lost preliminary, hosted and won 2005 Royal Bank Cup

Humboldt Broncos defeated Weyburn Red Wings 4-games-to-3
First in 2005 Royal Bank Cup round robin (3-1)
Weyburn Red Wings defeated Hawkesbury Hawks (CJHL) 4-3 3OT in semi-final
Weyburn Red Wings defeated Camrose Kodiaks (AJHL) 3-2 in final Royal Bank Cup champions

- 2006 Lost quarter-final

Weyburn Red Wings defeated Humboldt Broncos 4-games-to-2
Yorkton Terriers defeated Weyburn Red Wings 4-games-to-2

- 2007 Lost quarter-final

Weyburn Red Wings defeated Notre Dame Hounds 4-games-to-1
Melville Millionaires defeated Weyburn Red Wings 4-games-to-2

- 2008 Lost quarter-final

Third in round robin (0-2) vs. Melville Millionaires and Kindersley Klippers
Kindersley Klippers defeated Weyburn Red Wings 4-games-to-1

- 2009 Lost semi-final

Weyburn Red Wings defeated Kindersley Klippers 4-games-to-none
Melville Millionaires defeated Weyburn Red Wings 4-games-to-2

- 2010 Lost quarter-final

Yorkton Terriers defeated Weyburn Red Wings 4-games-to-1

- 2011 Lost quarter-final

Kindersley Klippers defeated Weyburn Red Wings 4-games-to-1

- 2012 Lost league final

Weyburn Red Wings defeated Estevan Bruins 4-games-to-none
Weyburn Red Wings defeated Melville Millionaires 4-games-to-3
Humboldt Broncos defeated Weyburn Red Wings 4-games-to-2

- 2013 Did not qualify
- 2014 Did not qualify
- 2015 Lost quarter-final

Melfort mustangs defeated Weyburn Red Wings 4-games-to-1

== Notable alumni ==
Joe Daley, goaltender for the 1961–1963 Red Wings played five seasons in the NHL, including with the 1971–72 Detroit Red Wings. Bill Lesuk, forward with the Red Wings from 1963–1966, went on to play seven seasons in the NHL, including for the 1969–70 Stanley Cup championship Boston Bruins. Other notable alumni include:

- Clayton Beddoes
- Patrick Bordeleau
- Gary Bromley
- Cam Brown
- Don Caley
- Dwight Carruthers
- Don Gillen
- Larry Giroux
- Mark Hartigan
- Larry Hornung
- Greg Hubick
- Dean Kennedy
- Walt Ledingham
- Barry Melrose
- Morris Mott
- Jerome Mrazek
- Barry Nieckar
- Rod Norrish
- John Rogers
- Peter Schaefer
- Gord Sherven
- Sandy Snow
- Dennis Sobchuk
- Gene Sobchuk
- Vic Venasky
- Darcy Verot

== See also ==
- List of ice hockey teams in Saskatchewan

Preceded by North York Rangers	Centennial Cup Champions; 1984	Succeeded by Orillia Travelways
Preceded by Aurora Tigers	Royal Bank Cup Champions; 2005	Succeeded by Burnaby Express
