= 2022–23 SJHL season =

Ice hockey season in Saskatchewan, Canada

- League: SJHL
- Sport: Ice hockey
- Duration: Regular season September – March; Postseason; March – April
- Games: 56
- Teams: 12
- TV partner: SaskTel maxTV
- Streaming partner: flohockey.tv

2022 Draft
- Top draft pick: Rhett Vedress
- Picked by: Weyburn Red Wings

Canterra Seeds Cup
- League championship: Battlefords North Stars
- Runners-up: Flin Flon Bombers
- Season MVP: Kian Bell

National championship
- Champions: Brooks Bandits (AJHL)
- Runners-up: Battlefords North Stars (SJHL)

SJHL seasons
- ← 2021–22 2023–24 →

The 2022–23 SJHL season was the 55th season of the Saskatchewan Junior Hockey League. The Battlefords North Stars won the league championship Canterra Seeds Cup and went on to the 2023 Centennial Cup national championship in Portage la Prairie, Manitoba.

== Season highlights ==
Battlefords North Stars head coach Brayden Klimosko received the Canadian Junior Hockey League Coach of the Year award. The league reduced the number of regular season games from 58 to 56. The league debuted its new championship trophy, the Canterra Seeds Cup.

== Regular season ==
Teams map, 2022–23 SJHL season
Global Ag Risk Solutions Division
Sherwood Division
Viterra Division

Teams played a 56-game schedule. The top 8 teams at the end of the regular season advanced to the post-season.

Standings
Rank	Team	GP	W	L	OTL	SOL	Pts
1	Battlefords North Stars	56	48	5	2	1	99
2	Humboldt Broncos	56	40	15	1	0	81
3	Flin Flon Bombers	56	37	15	2	2	78
4	Melfort Mustangs	56	31	16	5	4	71
5	La Ronge Ice Wolves	56	32	19	3	2	69
6	Estevan Bruins	56	28	23	3	2	61
7	Nipawin Hawks	56	26	24	5	1	58
8	Weyburn Red Wings	56	26	27	2	1	55
9	Notre Dame Hounds	56	22	28	4	2	50
10	Yorkton Terriers	56	19	36	0	1	39
11	Kindersley Klippers	56	13	34	4	5	35
12	Melville Millionaires	56	14	36	5	1	34

== Post-season ==
2023 SJHL playoffs
Canterra Seeds Cup

Tournament details
- Dates: 17 March – 22 April
- Teams: 8
- Defending champions: Estevan Bruins

Final positions
- Champions: Battlefords North Stars
- Runners-up: Flin Flon Bombers
- Semifinalists: Melfort Mustangs; Humboldt Broncos

Tournament statistics
- Games played: 36
- Goals scored: 210 (5.83 per game)
- Attendance: 38,641 (1,073 per game)

Official website
- 2023 SJHL playoffs

The 8 top-ranked teams at the end of the regular season qualified for the post-season. The winners of each round were determined by a best-of-7 series. In the final round, the Battlefords North Stars swept the Flin Flon Bombers in 4 games to win the Canterra Seeds Cup and advance to the 2023 Centennial Cup national championship tournament in Portage la Portage la Prairie, Manitoba. The Battlefords North Stars went on to lose to the Brooks Bandits of the AJHL in the 2023 Centennial Cup final.

Quarterfinals
Battlefords North Stars	4
Weyburn Red Wings	1
Melfort Mustangs	4
La Ronge Ice Wolves	2
Humboldt Broncos	4
Nipawin Hawks	1
Flin Flon Bombers	4
Estevan Bruins	3

Semifinals
Battlefords North Stars	4
Melfort Mustangs	0
Humboldt Broncos	1
Flin Flon Bombers	4

Finals
Battlefords North Stars	4
Flin Flon Bombers	0

== See also ==
- Hockey Canada
- Hockey Saskatchewan
