= 2017–18 SJHL season =

Saskatchewan Junior Hockey League season

- League: Saskatchewan Junior Hockey League
- Sport: Ice hockey

Regular Season
- Season champions: Nipawin Hawks
- Finals champions: Nipawin Hawks

List of SJHL seasons
- ← 2016–17 2018–19 →

The 2017–18 Saskatchewan Junior Hockey League was the league's 50th Season. The Nipawin Hawks won the Canalta Cup and were runners up to the Steinbach Pistons in the ANAVET Cup.

The season was nearly halted before the championship series following the Humboldt Broncos bus crash on April 6, 2018. On April 11, 2018, league officials announced plans to proceed with the final games of the season after what was described as an intensive, grueling decision by the league's Board of Governors.

Nipawin departed from its usual black and yellow colour scheme for the series, wearing green helmets in honour of the Broncos, while both teams wore memorial ribbon patches on their jerseys.

== Final standings ==
Teams map, 2017–18 SJHL season
Global Ag Risk Solutions Division
Sherwood Division
Viterra Division
- x = Clinched playoff position
- y = Clinched division
- e = Eliminated from playoffs

Viterra Division	GP	W	L	OTL	SOL	Pts	Pts%	GF	GA
y – Estevan Bruins	58	34	19	3	2	73	.629	239	184
x – Weyburn Red Wings	58	29	23	5	1	64	.552	184	183
x – Melville Millionaires	58	23	31	2	2	50	.431	155	188
e – Yorkton Terriers	58	13	40	3	2	31	.267	136	280

Global Ag Risk Solutions Division	GP	W	L	OTL	SOL	Pts	Pts%	GF	GA
y – Battlefords North Stars	58	42	14	2	0	86	.741	229	142
x – Humboldt Broncos	58	33	19	3	3	72	.621	203	165
x – Kindersley Klippers	58	29	22	4	3	65	.560	170	174
x – Notre Dame Hounds	58	29	24	1	4	63	.543	192	174

Sherwood Division	GP	W	L	OTL	SOL	Pts	Pts%	GF	GA
y – Nipawin Hawks	58	43	8	3	4	93	.802	232	131
x – Melfort Mustangs	58	39	13	4	2	84	.724	227	157
x – Flin Flon Bombers	58	24	26	3	5	56	.483	194	216
e – La Ronge Ice Wolves	58	10	45	0	3	23	.198	125	292

== Playoffs ==
Round 1
8	Notre Dame	1
9	Flin Flon	2
7	Weyburn	2
10	Melville	1

Round 2
1	Nipawin	4
9	Flin Flon	1
4	Melfort	1
5	Humboldt	4
2	Battlefords	4
7	Weyburn	0
3	Estevan	4
6	Kindersley	0

Round 3
1	Nipawin	3
5	Humboldt	1
2	Battlefords	1
3	Estevan	4

Round 4
1	Nipawin	4
4	Estevan	3

=== Humboldt Broncos bus crash ===
On April 6, 2018, the Humboldt Broncos team bus crashed on an intersection near Armley, Saskatchewan resulting in the deaths of 16 people and injuring 13 others, including players. At the time, the Nipawin Hawks had a 3-1 lead over the Broncos, while the Estevan Bruins were waiting to play in the league finals.

As a result, the game was not played and the Nipawin Hawks advanced to the league finals.

== ANAVET Cup ==
League Finals
1	Nipawin	4
4	Estevan	3
SJHL; MJHL
1	Steinbach	4
2	Virden	2

ANAVET Cup
S1	Nipawin	2
M1	Steinbach	4
