= Regina Blues =

Coordinates: 50°27′1.4″N 104°38′15.2″W

The Regina Blues were a Tier-II Junior "A" team based in Regina, Saskatchewan. They were members of the Saskatchewan Junior Hockey League.

== History ==
The "Pat Blues" were created in 1970 when the Regina Pats transferred from the SJHL to the Western Hockey League to maintain their Memorial Cup eligibility. The Blues were the Junior "A" affiliate team for the Major Junior parent club Regina Pats and played their home games at Regina Exhibition Stadium (1970–77) and Regina Agridome (1977–82, now called the Brandt Centre).

== Season-by-season standings ==
Season	GP	W	L	T	OTL	GF	GA	P	Results	Playoffs
1970-71	35	12	20	3	-	151	222	27	5th SJHL	
1971-72	46	29	17	0	-	234	171	39	6th SJHL	
1972-73	48	26	22	0	-	245	250	52	3rd SJHL South	
1973-74	50	31	18	1	-	227	185	63	2nd SJHL South	
1974-75	57	25	31	1	-	243	310	51	4th SJHL South	
1975-76	58	29	29	0	-	352	280	58	4th SJHL South	
1976-77	60	29	30	1	-	257	251	59	4th SJHL South	
1977-78	60	35	23	2	-	314	273	72	2nd SJHL South	
1978-79	60	32	26	2	-	363	312	60	3rd SJHL South	
1979-80	60	31	8	1	-	286	285	63	3rd SJHL South	Lost 1st round
1980-81	60	16	43	1	-	242	382	33	5th SJHL South	
1981-82	60	13	44	3	-	273	373	29	6th SJHL South	

=== Playoffs ===
- 1971 DNQ
- 1972 Lost quarter-final

Melville Millionaires defeated Regina Blues 4-games-to-none

- 1973 Lost quarter-final

Estevan Bruins defeated Regina Blues 4-games-to-2

- 1974 Lost quarter-final

Weyburn Red Wings defeated Regina Blues 4-games-to-1

- 1975 Lost quarter-final

Swift Current Broncos defeated Regina Blues 4-games-to-2

- 1976 Lost quarter-final

Weyburn Red Wings defeated Regina Blues 4-games-to-1

- 1977 Lost quarter-final

Weyburn Red Wings defeated Regina Blues 4-games-to-2

- 1978 Lost semi-final

Regina Blues defeated Estevan Bruins 4-games-to-1
Moose Jaw Canucks defeated Regina Blues 4-games-to-1

- 1979 Lost quarter-final

Moose Jaw Canucks defeated Regina Blues 4-games-to-1

- 1980 Lost quarter-final

Estevan Bruins defeated Regina Blues 4-games-to-none

- 1981 DNQ
- 1982 DNQ
