= Estevan Bruins =

Junior ice hockey team in Estevan, Saskatchewan, Canada

- City: Estevan, Saskatchewan
- League: SJHL
- Division: Viterra
- Founded: 1948
- Home arena: Affinity Place
- Colours: Gold and black
- General manager: Drew Kocur
- Head coach: Drew Kocur
- Website: estevanbruins.com

Franchise history
- Since 1971: Estevan Bruins

Previous franchise history
- 1948–1955: Humboldt Indians
- 1955–1957: Humboldt-Melfort Indians
- 1957–1971: Estevan Bruins
- 1971–1981: New Westminster Bruins
- 1981–1984: Kamloops Junior Oilers
- Since 1984: Kamloops Blazers

The Estevan Bruins are a junior ice hockey team playing in the Junior "A" Saskatchewan Junior Hockey League (SJHL). The team is based in Estevan, Saskatchewan, Canada, and plays at Affinity Place. They were founded in 1971, when a previous franchise called the Estevan Bruins, which played in the Saskatchewan Junior Hockey League from 1957 to 1966 and then the Major Junior Western Hockey League (WHL) from 1966 to 1971, relocated to New Westminster, British Columbia; that franchise is today known as the Kamloops Blazers.

== The original Estevan Bruins (1957–1971) ==
In 1956, Scotty Munro made a presentation to the leaders of the booming oil town of Estevan. His plan was to move his Humboldt/Melfort Indians (playing in Humboldt and Melfort, Saskatchewan), which was a franchise in the original version of the Saskatchewan Junior Hockey League (1948–1966), to Estevan. The concept of Major Junior hockey had not yet been created, so this original SJHL was playing at the top level of junior hockey in Saskatchewan; should the citizens of Estevan finance the building of a new arena, Munro would bring top-notch hockey entertainment and much-needed help for minor hockey in the town.

His pitch was successful and one year later his newly renamed "Bruins" arrived in Estevan to begin the 1957–58 season in the newly built Agricultural Auditorium. At the time, the Saskatchewan Junior Hockey League had six teams. The Estevan Bruins, based near the border with the United States, were the southernmost team, located 800 kilometres (500 mi) away from the northernmost team, the Flin Flon Bombers, and would make shorter trips to play the Prince Albert Minto's, Regina Pats, Saskatoon Quakers and Melville Millionaires. The league had grown to eight teams by its final season, 1965–66, then disbanded when five of its eight teams – including the Estevan Bruins – joined the newly formed Canadian Major Junior Hockey League (along with two Alberta-based teams) for the inaugural 1966–67 CMJHL season.

The CMJHL was renamed the Western Canada Junior Hockey League, expanding into Manitoba, for the 1967–68 WCHL season. The Bruins scored their greatest success in that 1967–68 season, finishing second in the regular season before winning the President's Cup as WCHL playoff champions. They advanced to face British Columbia's Mowat Cup champion, the Penticton Broncos, whom they defeated to take the Abbott Cup as champion of Western Canada. The Bruins then faced Ontario's Niagara Falls Flyers, winner of Eastern Canada's George Richardson Memorial Trophy (having defeated Quebec's Verdun Maple Leafs), in a best-of-7 series for the 1968 Memorial Cup national championship. The Bruins were defeated, in five games, as the Flyers won their second Memorial Cup.

Starting in 1969, the team played a portion of its schedule in the Bismarck Civic Center in Bismarck, North Dakota. The new SJHL franchise continued this in 1971 until the end of the 1972-73 season.

The Bruins played in Estevan through to the completion of the 1970-71 WCHL season, then relocated to New Westminster, British Columbia, where they became the New Westminster Bruins. This continued until the end of the 1972-73 season. The franchise again relocated in 1981 after being purchased by then-owner of the Edmonton Oilers, Peter Pocklington, who renamed them the Kamloops Junior Oilers.

=== Season-by-season results ===
Note: GP = Games played, W = Wins, L = Losses, T = Ties, OTL = Overtime Losses, Pts = Points, GF = Goals for, GA = Goals against

Season	GP	W	L	T	OTL	GF	GA	Points	Finish	Playoffs
1966–67	56	33	18	5	—	273	197	71	2nd WCHL	Lost semi-final
1967–68	60	45	13	2	—	262	169	90	2nd WCHL	Won Championship
1968–69	60	40	28	0	—	294	195	80	2nd WCHL East	Lost semi-final
1969–70	60	28	31	1	—	237	255	57	2nd WCHL East	Lost quarter-final
1970–71	66	41	20	5	—	283	201	87	1st WCHL East	Lost quarter-final

== The modern Estevan Bruins ==
With the departure of the major junior Bruins, a new Bruins team was founded in Estevan that same year, which has played in the SJHL ever since.

The Estevan Bruins have won the SJHL championship in 1985, 1999 and 2022.

Radio station CKSE-FM (Rock 106) broadcasts Bruins games. DiscoverEstevan.com covers the team on a daily basis. The team is also covered in print on a weekly basis by the Estevan Mercury and Estevan Lifestyles.

== Season-by-season results ==
Note: GP = Games played, W = Wins, L = Losses, T = Ties, OTL = Overtime Losses, Pts = Points, GF = Goals for, GA = Goals against

Season	GP	W	L	T	OTL	GF	GA	Points	Finish	Playoffs
1971–72	46	26	20	0	—	227	184	40	5th SJHL	
1972–73	48	34	14	0	—	243	163	68	2nd SJHL South	
1973–74	50	34	14	2	—	233	150	70	1st SJHL	
1974–75	58	41	17	0	—	302	202	82	2nd SJHL	
1975–76	58	29	28	1	—	300	291	59	3rd SJHL South	
1976–77	60	20	40	0	—	237	358	40	5th SJHL South	
1977–78	60	32	26	2	—	309	265	66	3rd SJHL South	
1978–79	60	14	45	1	—	211	339	29	6th SJHL South	
1979–80	60	34	26	0	—	318	273	68	2nd SJHL South	Lost 2nd round
1980–81	60	34	24	2	—	326	272	70	2nd SJHL South	Did not qualify
1981–82	60	17	40	3	—	246	332	37	5th SJHL South	Did not qualify
1982–83	64	23	41	0	—	294	353	46	7th SJHL	Lost 1st round
1983–84	64	30	33	1	—	301	341	61	6th SJHL	Lost 1st round
1984–85	64	44	18	2	—	382	275	90	2nd SJHL	Won League, won Anavet Cup
1985–86	60	47	11	2	—	461	242	96	2nd SJHL	
1986–87	64	25	36	3	—	301	340	53	6th SJHL	Lost 1st round
1987–88	60	29	29	2	—	289	305	60	5th SJHL	
1988–89	64	30	33	1	—	347	357	61	4th SJHL South	
1989–90	68	30	30	8	—	239	261	68	3rd SJHL South	Lost 1st round
1990–91	68	26	37	5	—	260	330	57	5th SJHL South	Did not qualify
1991–92	64	45	16	3	—	328	224	94	1st SJHL	Lost final
1992–93	64	32	26	2	—	256	232	70	3rd SJHL South	Lost semi-final
1993–94	68	27	32	9	—	245	252	63	4th SJHL South	Lost 1st round
1994–95	64	29	29	6	—	259	271	64	4th SJHL South	Lost quarter-final
1995–96	64	38	17	9	—	273	202	85	2nd SJHL South	Lost semi-final
1996–97	64	19	37	8	—	230	282	46	5th SJHL South	Lost quarter-final
1997–98	64	28	29	7	—	220	234	63	3rd SJHL South	Lost quarter-final
1998–99	66	44	14	8	—	288	191	96	1st SJHL	Won League, won Anavet Cup
1999–00	60	20	32	8	—	190	246	48	5th SJHL South	Lost quarter-final
2000–01	62	20	38	3	1	225	299	44	6th SJHL South	Did not qualify
2001–02	64	29	25	4	6	243	259	68	3rd SJHL Sherwood	Lost quarter-final
2002–03	60	19	32	5	4	212	262	47	5th SJHL Sherwood	Did not qualify
2003–04	60	21	23	8	8	188	209	58	5th SJHL Sherwood	Did not qualify
2004–05	55	34	14	6	1	195	143	75	1st SJHL	Lost semi-final
2005–06	55	13	36	3	3	140	223	32	6th SJHL Sherwood	Did not qualify
2006–07	58	31	21	0	6	203	203	68	1st SJHL Sherwood	Lost quarter-final
2007–08	58	29	25	—	4	197	184	62	4th SJHL Sherwood	Lost Survivor Series
2008–09	56	24	25	—	7	203	185	55	5th SJHL Sherwood	Lost Survivor Series
2009–10	58	18	36	—	4	160	209	40	6th SJHL Sherwood	Did not qualify
2010–11	58	29	23	—	6	228	229	64	7th SJHL	Lost quarter-final
2011–12	58	28	28	—	2	208	211	58	9th SJHL	Lost quarter-final
2012–13	54	21	29	4	0	153	199	46	9th SJHL	Lost quarter-final
2013–14	56	27	20	3	6	164	173	63	3 of 4 Viterra Div; 6th SJHL	Lost quarter-final
2014–15	56	22	27	—	7	146	203	51	3 of 4 Viterra Div; 10th of 12 SJHL	Lost Wild Card, 2–3 (North Stars)
2015–16	58	35	20	0	3	231	203	73	2 of 4 Viterra Div; 5th of 12 SJHL	Lost quarterfinals, 2–4 (Hawks); Western Canada Cup as Hosts
2016–17	58	37	18	2	1	225	201	77	1 of 4 Viterra Div; 4th of 12 SJHL	Won quarterfinals, 4–1 (Terriers); Lost semifinals 0–4 (North Stars)
2017–18	58	34	19	3	2	239	184	73	1 of 4 Viterra Div; 4th of 12 SJHL	Won quarterfinals 4–0 (Klippers); Won semifinals 4–1 (North Stars); Lost SJHL Finals 3–4 (Hawks)
2018–19	58	31	22	3	2	210	171	67	1 of 4 Viterra Div; 7th of 12 SJHL	Won quarterfinals 4–3 (Broncos); Lost semifinals 2-4 (Mustangs)
2019–20	58	31	23	3	1	211	192	66	2 of 4 Viterra Div; 6th of 12 SJHL	Down in Quarterfinals 3–1 (Mustangs); Playoffs cancelled due to the COVID-19 pandemic
2020–21	6	4	1	1	0	26	19	9	SJHL season cancelled due to COVID-19 pandemic	
2021-22	58	43	10	2	3	262	124	91	1 of 4 Viterra Div; 1st of 12 SJHL	Won quarterfinals 4–1 (Hounds); Won semifinals 4–0 (Terriers); Won SJHL 4-3 (Bombers)
2022-23	56	28	23	3	2	187	186	61	1 of 4 Viterra Div; 6th of 12 SJHL	Lost quarterfinals 4–3 (Bombers)
2023-24	56	26	26	2	2	190	212	56	3rd of 4 Viterra Div; 7th of 12 SJHL	Lost quarterfinals 1-4 (Mustangs)
2024-25	56	18	31	5	2	168	229	43	4th of 4 Viterra Div; 10th of 12 SJHL	Did not qualify
2025–26	56	26	25	4	1	191	188	57	4th of 4 Bunge Div; 8th of 12 SJHL	lost quarterfinals 0-4 (Bombers)

=== Playoffs ===
- 1972 Lost quarter-final

Humboldt Broncos defeated Estevan Bruins 4 games to none

- 1973 Lost final

Estevan Bruins defeated Regina Blues 4 games to 2
Estevan Bruins defeated Weyburn Red Wings 4 games to 1
Humboldt Broncos defeated Estevan Bruins 4 games to 2

- 1974 Lost final

Estevan Bruins defeated Moose Jaw Canucks 4 games to none
Estevan Bruins defeated Weyburn Red Wings 4 games to 1
Prince Albert Raiders defeated Estevan Bruins 4 games to 1

- 1975 Lost quarter-final

Weyburn Red Wings defeated Estevan Bruins 4 games to 3

- 1976 Lost quarter-final

Melville Millionaires defeated Estevan Bruins 4 games to 3

- 1977 DNQ
- 1978 Lost quarter-final

Regina Blues defeated Estevan Bruins 4 games to 1

- 1979 DNQ
- 1980 Lost semi-final

Estevan Bruins defeated Regina Blues 4 games to none
Moose Jaw Canucks defeated Estevan Bruins 4 games to 2

- 1981 Lost semi-final

Estevan Bruins defeated Yorkton Terriers 4 games to 3
Moose Jaw Canucks defeated Estevan Bruins 4 games to none

- 1982 DNQ
- 1983 Lost quarter-final

Yorkton Terriers defeated Estevan Bruins 4 games to none

- 1984 Lost quarter-final

Melville Millionaires defeated Estevan Bruins 4 games to 1

- 1985 Won League, won Anavet Cup, lost Abbott Cup

Estevan Bruins defeated Lloydminster Lancers 4 games to none
Estevan Bruins defeated Battlefords North Stars 4 games to 1
Estevan Bruins defeated Weyburn Red Wings 4 games to 3 SAJHL CHAMPIONS
Estevan Bruins defeated Selkirk Steelers (MJHL) 4 games to 1 ANAVET CUP CHAMPIONS
Penticton Knights (BCJHL) defeated Estevan Bruins 4 games to none

- 1986 Lost final

Estevan Bruins defeated Melville Millionaires 4 games to none
Estevan Bruins defeated Weyburn Red Wings 4 games to none
Humboldt Broncos defeated Estevan Bruins 4 games to 3

- 1987 Lost quarter-final

Lloydminster Lancers defeated Estevan Bruins 4 games to 1

- 1988 Lost quarter-final

Humboldt Broncos defeated Estevan Bruins 4 games to 1

- 1989 Lost quarter-final

Humboldt Broncos defeated Estevan Bruins 4 games to none

- 1990 Lost quarter-final

Weyburn Red Wings defeated Estevan Bruins 4 games to 2

- 1991 DNQ
- 1992 Lost final

Estevan Bruins defeated Yorkton Terriers 4 games to none
Estevan Bruins defeated Melville Millionaires 4 games to 1
Melfort Mustangs defeated Estevan Bruins 4 games to 1

- 1993 Lost semi-final

Estevan Bruins defeated Yorkton Terriers 4 games to 2
Melville Millionaires defeated Estevan Bruins 4 games to 1

- 1994 Lost preliminary

Notre Dame Hounds defeated Estevan Bruins 3 games to 1

- 1995 Lost quarter-final

Estevan Bruins defeated Melville Millionaires 2 games to none
Lebret Eagles defeated Estevan Bruins 4 games to 1

- 1996 Lost semi-final

Estevan Bruins defeated Lebret Eagles 4 games to 2
Yorkton Terriers defeated Estevan Bruins 4 games to 3

- 1997 Lost quarter-final

Estevan Bruins defeated Minot Top Guns 2 games to none
Weyburn Red Wings defeated Estevan Bruins 4 games to none

- 1998 Lost quarter-final

Weyburn Red Wings defeated Estevan Bruins 4 games to 1

- 1999 Won League, won Anavet Cup, Eliminated from 1999 Royal Bank Cup round robin

Estevan Bruins defeated Melville Millionaires 4 games to none
Estevan Bruins defeated Notre Dame Hounds 4 games to 1
Estevan Bruins defeated Humboldt Broncos 4 games to none SJHL CHAMPIONS
Estevan Bruins defeated OCN Blizzard (MJHL) 4 games to 2 ANAVET CUP CHAMPIONS
Fifth in 1999 Royal Bank Cup round robin (1-3)

- 2000 Lost quarter-final

First in round robin (2-2) vs. Weyburn Red Wings and Yorkton Terriers
Melville Millionaires defeated Estevan Bruins 4 games to 1

- 2001 DNQ
- 2002 Lost quarter-final

Humboldt Broncos defeated Estevan Bruins 4 games to 1

- 2003 DNQ
- 2004 DNQ
- 2005 Lost semi-final

Third in round robin (1-3) vs. Yorkton Terriers and Notre Dame Hounds
Estevan Bruins defeated Humboldt Broncos 4 games to none
Yorkton Terriers defeated Estevan Bruins 4 games to 3

- 2006 DNQ
- 2007 Lost quarter-final

Second in round robin (1-2-1) vs. Melville Millionaires and Yorkton Terriers
Yorkton Terriers defeated Estevan Bruins 4 games to 2

- 2008 Lost preliminary

Yorkton Terriers defeated Estevan Bruins 4 games to 2

- 2009 Lost preliminary

Kindersley Klippers defeated Estevan Bruins 3 games to 2

- 2010 DNQ
- 2011 Lost quarter-final

Estevan Bruins defeated Melville Millionaires 3 games to 2
Yorkton Terriers defeated Estevan Bruins 4 games to none

- 2012

Qualifying Round Estevan Bruins defeated Notre Dame Hounds 3 games to 0
Quarter-final Weyburn Red Wings defeated Estevan Bruins 4 games to none

- 2013

Qualifying Round Estevan Bruins defeated Kindersley Klippers 3 games to 1
Quarter-final Yorkton Terriers defeated Estevan Bruins 4 games to 1

- 2014

Qualifying Round Estevan Bruins defeated Flin Flon Bombers 3 games to 2
Quarter-final Battlefords North Stars defeated Estevan Bruins 4 games to 1

- 2015

Survivor Series Battlefords North Stars defeated Estevan Bruins 3 games to 2

- 2016

Quarter-final Nipawin Hawks defeated Estevan Bruins 4 games to 2

- 2017

Semi-final Estevan Bruins defeated Yorkton Terriers 4 games to 1
Quarter-final Battlefords North Stars defeated Estevan Bruins 4 games to 0

- 2018

Quarter-final Estevan Bruins defeated Kindersley Klippers 4 games to 0
Semi-final Estevan Bruins defeated Battlefords North Stars 4 games to 1
Final Nipawin Hawks defeated Estevan Bruins 4 games to 3

- 2019

Quarter-final Estevan Bruins defeated Humboldt Broncos 4 games to 3
Quarter-final Melfort Mustangs defeated Estevan Bruins 4 games to 2

- 2020

Quarter-final Melfort Mustangs leading Estevan Bruins 3 games to 1
Playoffs cancelled due to COVID-19 pandemic

- 2021 Season cancelled due to COVID-19 pandemic
- 2022

Quarter-final Estevan Bruins defeated Notre Dame Hounds 4 games to 1
Semi-final Estevan Bruins defeated Yorkton Terriers 4 games to 0
Final Estevan Bruins defeated Flin Flon Bombers 4 games to 3 SJHL CHAMPIONS

- 2023

Quarter-final Flin Flon Bombers defeated Estevan Bruins 4 games to 3

- 2024

Quarter-final Melfort Mustangs defeated Estevan Bruins 4 games to 1

- 2025 DNQ

- 2026

Quarter-final Flin Flon Bombers defeated Estevan Bruins 4 games to 0

== Regional championships ==
Year	Round-robin	Record	Standing	Semifinal	Championship game	Runner-up game
2016	L, West Kelowna Warriors 0–3; L, Portage Terriers 2–3; L, Melfort Mustangs 1–2; L, Brooks Bandits 4–6	0–4–0	5th of 5	Did not advance		

== National championships ==
Year	Round-robin	Record	Standing	Quarterfinal	Semifinal	Championship
2022	L, Longueuil Collège Français (QJHL), 3-5; L, Pickering Panthers (OJHL), 5–10; W, Red Lake Miners (SIJHL), 6-2; L, Brooks Bandits (AJHL), 0-4	1-3-0	4th of 5 Pool A	Did not qualify	Did not qualify	Did not qualify

== See also ==
- List of ice hockey teams in Saskatchewan
