= 1984 Centennial Cup =

1984 Manitoba Centennial Cup
Tournament details
- Venue(s): Weyburn, Saskatchewan
- Dates: May 1984
- Teams: 2

Final positions
- Champions: Weyburn Red Wings (1st title)
- Runners-up: Orillia Travelways

Tournament statistics
- Games played: 7

Awards
- MVP: Ron Amyotte (Weyburn)

The 1984 Centennial Cup is the 14th Junior "A" 1984 ice hockey National Championship for the Canadian Junior A Hockey League.

The Centennial Cup was competed for by the winners of the Abbott Cup/Western Canadian Champions and the Eastern Canadian Jr. A Champions. The Maritimes champions did not compete for the Eastern championship.

The finals were hosted by the Weyburn Red Wings in the city of Weyburn, Saskatchewan.

== The Playoffs ==
Regionals
S	Weyburn Red Wings	4
M	Selkirk Steelers	2
Western Canada
BC	Langley Eagles	4
A	Ft Sask Traders	2
Ont	Orillia Travelways	3
Ont	R-B Canadians	1
Eastern Canada
TB	Thunder Bay Kings	0
Ont	Pembroke L. Kings	4

Semi-finals
S	Weyburn Red Wings	4
BC	Langley Eagles	0
OJ	Orillia Travelways	4
CJ	Pembroke Lumber Kings	0

Finals
S	Weyburn Red Wings	4
OJ	Orillia Travelways	3

Prior to the Regionals

Langley Eagles (BCJHL) defeated Prince George Spruce Kings (PCJHL) 2-games-to-none
Selkirk Steelers (MJHL) defeated Flin Flon Bombers (NMJHL) 4-games-to-1

=== MCC Finals ===
Centennial Cup Results
Game	Team	Score	Team	Score	Notes
1	Weyburn Red Wings	5	Orillia Travelways	6	Final
2	Weyburn Red Wings	6	Orillia Travelways	4	Final
3	Weyburn Red Wings	7	Orillia Travelways	4	Final
4	Weyburn Red Wings	1	Orillia Travelways	2	Final
5	Weyburn Red Wings	5	Orillia Travelways	8	Final
6	Weyburn Red Wings	5	Orillia Travelways	4	Final
7	Weyburn Red Wings	3	Orillia Travelways	0	Final

== Regional Championships ==
Manitoba Centennial Cup: Weyburn Red Wings

Abbott Cup: Weyburn Red Wings
Eastern Champions: Orillia Terriers

Doyle Cup: Langley Eagles
Anavet Cup: Weyburn Red Wings
Dudley Hewitt Cup: Orillia Travelways
Callaghan Cup:

== Roll of League Champions ==
AJHL: Fort Saskatchewan Traders
BCJHL: Langley Eagles
CJHL: Pembroke Lumber Kings
IJHL: Western Capitals
MJHL: Selkirk Steelers
MVJHL: Halifax Lions
NMJHL: Flin Flon Bombers
NOJHL: Rayside-Balfour Canadians
OJHL: Orillia Travelways
PCJHL: Prince George Spruce Kings
SJHL: Weyburn Red Wings

== Awards ==
Most Valuable Player: Ron Amyotte (Weyburn Red Wings)
Most Sportsmanlike Player: Ron Amyotte (Weyburn Red Wings)

== See also ==
- Canadian Junior A Hockey League
- Royal Bank Cup
- Anavet Cup
- Doyle Cup
- Dudley Hewitt Cup
- Fred Page Cup
- Abbott Cup
- Mowat Cup
