= Lebret Eagles =

Defunct junior ice hockey team in Lebret, Saskatchewan

- City: Lebret, Saskatchewan
- League: SJHL
- Founded: 1993
- Folded: 2001
- Home arena: Lebret Eagledome (capacity: 1,200)
- Colours: Blue, yellow and red
- Owners: Star Blanket Cree Nation

The Lebret Eagles were a Junior "A" team based in Lebret, Saskatchewan, Canada. They used to be members of the Saskatchewan Junior Hockey League.

== History ==
The Lebret Eagles played 8 seasons in the Saskatchewan Junior Hockey League from 1993 to 2001.

The team's formation as the SJHL's 13th club was announced during a press conference on May 13th, 1993 overlooking Mission Lake.

Star Blanket Cree Nation put up the $50,000 expansion fee, making the Eagles Saskatchewan's first Indigenous-owned and operated junior hockey club.

Right winger Carlin Nordstrom was the first player chosen in the 1993 dispersal draft. He'd later play NCAA Division I college hockey with Western Michigan University.

The Lebret Eagles played their home games at the Eagle Dome in Lebret, Saskatchewan. The rink’s capacity was expanded to 1,200 to accommodate the team’s needs, along with other upgrades.

In 2001, the team left the league and a year later the franchise was dissolved.

== Season-by-season standings ==
Season	GP	W	L	T	OTL	GF	GA	P	Results	Playoffs
1993-94	68	25	37	6	-	258	320	56	6th SJHL South	Lost 1st round
1994-95	64	35	23	6	-	285	260	76	1st SJHL South	Lost semi-final
1995-96	64	37	25	2	-	254	190	76	3rd SJHL South	Lost quarter-final
1996-97	64	44	16	4	-	307	204	92	2nd SJHL South	Lost semi-final
1997-98	64	37	22	5	-	284	209	79	1st SJHL South	Lost semi-final
1998-99	66	37	27	2	-	256	214	76	4th SJHL South	Lost 1st round
1999-00	60	12	43	5	-	178	307	29	6th SJHL South	DNQ
2000-01	62	31	23	4	4	263	262	70	3rd SJHL South	Lost semi-final

=== Playoffs ===
- 1994 Lost preliminary

Yorkton Terriers defeated Lebret Eagles 3-games-to-1

- 1995 Lost semi-final

Lebret Eagles defeated Estevan Bruins 4-games-to-1
Weyburn Red Wings defeated Lebret Eagles 4-games-to-none

- 1996 Lost quarter-final

Estevan Bruins defeated Lebret Eagles 4-games-to-2

- 1997 Lost semi-final

Lebret Eagles defeated Notre Dame Hounds 4-games-to-2
Weyburn Red Wings defeated Lebret Eagles 4-games-to-1

- 1998 Lost semi-final

Lebret Eagles defeated Notre Dame Hounds 4-games-to-2
Weyburn Red Wings defeated Lebret Eagles 4-games-to-3

- 1999 Lost preliminary

Melville Millionaires defeated Lebret Eagles 2-games-to-none

- 2000 DNQ
- 2001 Lost semi-final

Lebret Eagles defeated Melville Millionaires 4-games-to-2
Weyburn Red Wings defeated Lebret Eagles 4-games-to-1
