= Lukáš Pabiška =

Czech ice hockey player

- Born: February 24, 1984 (age 41); Liberec, Czechoslovakia
- Height: 6 ft 0 in (183 cm)
- Weight: 183 lb (83 kg; 13 st 1 lb)
- Position: Forward
- Shoots: Left
- Czech Extraliga team: BK Mladá Boleslav
- Playing career: 2002–present

Lukáš Pabiška (born February 24, 1984) is a Czech professional ice hockey forward who played with BK Mladá Boleslav in the Czech Extraliga during the 2010–11 Czech Extraliga season.
