= Moose Jaw Canucks =

- City: Moose Jaw, Saskatchewan
- League: Western Hockey League; Saskatchewan Junior Hockey League
- Operated: c. 1930–1984 (dormant 1955–1958)
- Home arena: Moose Jaw Arena (c. 1930–1955); Moose Jaw Civic Centre (1959–1984)

The Moose Jaw Canucks were a junior ice hockey team based in Moose Jaw, Saskatchewan, Canada. They were one of the founding members of the original Western Canada Junior Hockey League (1948–1956), and in 1966 were founding members of a new Western Canada Junior Hockey League (known since 1978 as the Western Hockey League) following a rebellion within the Saskatchewan Junior Hockey League. The franchise evolved from the Moose Jaw Cubs in the early 1930s.

The Canucks won the Abbott Cup in 1945 and 1947, making them the Junior "A" Champion for Western Canada and earning a playoff against the George Richardson Memorial Trophy- winning Eastern Champion for the Memorial Cup. The Canucks lost their Memorial Cup competition against the Toronto St. Michael's Majors in both years.

== Franchise history ==
The Canucks played in the following leagues in their history:

- Prior to 1936: Independent schedule
- 1936–1946: Southern Saskatchewan Junior Hockey League
- 1946–1948: Saskatchewan Junior Hockey League
- 1948–1955: Western Canada Junior Hockey League
- 1955–1958: dormant
- 1958–1966: Saskatchewan Junior Hockey League
- 1966–1968: Western Canada Junior Hockey League
- 1968–1984: Saskatchewan Junior Hockey League

In 1984, the Canucks folded to make room for the WHL's Moose Jaw Warriors, when that franchise transferred from Winnipeg. Another team, also known as the Moose Jaw Canucks, played in the South Saskatchewan Junior B Hockey League (now known as the Prairie Junior Hockey League) from 1992–94.

The Canucks legacy is survived by the Jr. C Canucks, who have played in the Saskatchewan Junior C Hockey League since 2006.

== WCJHL history ==
In the summer of 1966, the Canucks were one of five SJHL clubs that left the provincial league to join franchises in Calgary and Edmonton in the new Western Canada Junior Hockey League. The league was considered a "rebel league" by the Canadian Amateur Hockey Association, and thus denied the right to compete for Canadian junior hockey's top prize, the Memorial Cup.

In the WCJHL's inaugural season, the Canucks won the playoff championships despite finishing 4th in the overall standings. The following year, the Canucks would lose out in the playoff semi-finals after another 4th-place finish.

Concerned about the WCJHL's poor reputation with the CAHA and hoping to once again compete for the Memorial Cup, the Canucks, along with the Regina Pats and Weyburn Red Wings, would leave the WCJHL to return to the reborn SJHL. Following the reorganization of junior hockey in 1970, which saw the Western Canada Hockey League gain Tier-I status, and the SJHL being deemed Tier-II (not Memorial Cup eligible), the Canucks attempted to rejoin the WCHL but were denied. The Canucks would remain in the SJHL until the arrival of the Warriors.

== Season-by-season standings ==
Season	GP	W	L	T	OTL	GF	GA	P	Results	Playoffs
1936–37	6	3	3	0	-	25	58	6	3rd SSJHL	Lost final
1937–38	6	6	0	0	-	46	11	12	1st SSJHL	Won league
1938–39	10	7	2	1	-	35	20	15	1st SSJHL	Won league, won SAHA
1939–40	12	6	5	1	-	57	50	13	2nd SSJHL	Lost final
1940–41	18	4	13	1	-	70	96	10	4th SSJHL	DNQ
1941–42	11	1	10	0	-	24	42	2	3rd SSJHL	DNQ
1942–43	15	6	7	2	-	54	51	16	3rd SSJHL	Lost semi-final
1943–44	22	10	9	3	-	91	85	26	4th SSJHL	Lost semi-final
1944–45	16	14	2	0	-	112	41	28	1st SSJHL	Won league, won SAHA, won Abbott Cup
1945–46	18	18	0	0	-	157	55	36	1st SSJHL	Won league, won SAHA
1946–47	30	21	9	0	-	190	111	41	2nd SJHL	Won league, won Abbott Cup
1947–48	28	21	6	1	-	177	94	43	1st SJHL	Won league
1948–49	26	17	8	1	-	139	94	35	2nd WCJHL	Lost final, won SAHA
1949–50	40	22	18	0	-	162	180	44	2nd WCJHL	Lost semi-final
1950–51	40	16	22	2	-	147	160	34	5th WCJHL	DNQ
1951–52	44	21	23	0	-	178	171	42	5th WCJHL	DNQ
1952–53	36	13	23	0	-	164	209	26	5th WCJHL	Lost semi-final
1953–54	36	17	19	0	-	166	191	29	4th WCJHL	Lost quarter-final
1954–55	40	5	35	0	-	100	264	10	5th WCJHL	DNQ
1955–58	Franchise Dormant									
1958–59	48	11	36	1	-	166	328	23	7th SJHL	DNQ
1959–60	59	6	52	1	-	161	378	13	7th SJHL	DNQ
1960–61	60	24	26	10	-	181	212	58	4th SJHL	Lost semi-final
1961–62	56	22	25	9	-	199	225	53	5th SJHL	Won league
1962–63	54	25	22	7	-	212	188	57	4th SJHL	Lost quarter-final
1963–64	62	26	30	6	-	290	352	58	5th SJHL	Lost semi-final
1964–65	56	19	34	3	-	211	286	41	7th SJHL	DNQ
1965–66	60	33	23	4	-	295	229	70	4th SJHL	Lost semi-final
1966–67	56	25	19	12	-	215	190	62	4th WCJHL	Won league
1967–68	60	31	24	5	-	263	243	67	4th WCJHL	Lost semi-final
1968–69	44	19	24	1	-	223	245	39	3rd SJHL	Lost semi-final
1969–70	36	16	18	2	-	143	152	34	3rd SJHL	Lost semi-final
1970–71	Did not participate									
1971–72	50	7	43	0	-	174	345	13	9th SJHL	DNQ
1972–73	48	23	25	0	-	239	242	46	4th SJHL South	Lost quarter-final
1973–74	50	23	27	0	-	253	251	46	4th SJHL South	Lost quarter-final
1974–75	58	16	42	0	-	278	333	32	6th SJHL South	DNQ
1975–76	58	22	33	3	-	264	299	47	6th SJHL North	DNQ
1976–77	60	42	18	0	-	362	208	84	2nd SJHL South	Lost quarter-final
1977–78	60	41	19	0	-	351	262	82	1st SJHL South	Lost final
1978–79	60	34	24	2	-	322	263	70	2nd SJHL South	Lost final
1979–80	60	44	15	1	-	343	245	89	1st SJHL South	Lost final
1980–81	60	40	14	0	-	406	268	92	1st SJHL South	Lost final
1981–82	60	29	29	2	-	262	248	60	2nd SJHL South	Lost quarter-final
1982–83	64	27	34	3	-	299	345	57	6th SJHL	Lost semi-final
1983–84	64	35	28	1	-	344	314	71	4th SJHL	Lost quarter-final

=== Playoffs ===
- 1969 Lost semi-final

Regina Pats defeated Moose Jaw Canucks 4-games-to-none

- 1970 Lost semi-final

Weyburn Red Wings defeated Moose Jaw Canucks 4-games-to-none

- 1971 Did not participate
- 1972 DNQ
- 1973 Lost quarter-final

Weyburn Red Wings defeated Moose Jaw Canucks 4-games-to-1

- 1974 Lost quarter-final

Estevan Bruins defeated Moose Jaw Canucks 4-games-to-none

- 1975 DNQ
- 1976 DNQ
- 1977 Lost quarter-final

Melville Millionaires defeated Moose Jaw Canucks 4-games-to-2

- 1978 Lost final

Moose Jaw Canucks defeated Weyburn Red Wings 4-games-to-1
Moose Jaw Canucks defeated Regina Blues 4-games-to-1
Prince Albert Raiders defeated Moose Jaw Canucks 4-games-to-1

- 1979 Lost final

Moose Jaw Canucks defeated Regina Blues 4-games-to-1
Moose Jaw Canucks defeated Melville Millionaires 4-games-to-none
Prince Albert Raiders defeated Moose Jaw Canucks 4-games-to-2

- 1980 Lost final

Moose Jaw Canucks defeated Melville Millionaires 4-games-to-1
Moose Jaw Canucks defeated Estevan Bruins 4-games-to-2
Prince Albert Raiders defeated Moose Jaw Canucks 4-games-to-2

- 1981 Lost final

Moose Jaw Canucks defeated Weyburn Red Wings 4-games-to-1
Moose Jaw Canucks defeated Estevan Bruins 4-games-to-none
Prince Albert Raiders defeated Moose Jaw Canucks 4-games-to-3

- 1982 Lost quarter-final

Weyburn Red Wings defeated Moose Jaw Canucks 4-games-to-2

- 1983 Lost semi-final

Moose Jaw Canucks defeated Humboldt Broncos 4-games-to-none
Weyburn Red Wings defeated Moose Jaw Canucks 4-games-to-3

- 1984 Lost quarter-final

Lloydminster Lancers defeated Moose Jaw Canucks 4-games-to-1

== Notable alumni ==
- Chris Chelios
- Willie Desjardins
- Al Rollins
- Larry Popein
- Fred Sasakamoose

== See also ==
- List of ice hockey teams in Saskatchewan
