= Notre Dame Hounds =

Former ice hockey team in Wilcox, Saskatchewan

- City: Wilcox, Saskatchewan
- League: SJHL
- Division: Sherwood
- Founded: 1933
- Folded: 2025
- Home arena: Duncan McNeill Arena
- Colours: Red and white
- Website: notredame.ca/hockey

Franchise history
- 1970–1976: SJHL (Junior A)
- 1976–1987: Midget AAA (U-18)
- 1987–2025: SJHL

Championships
- Regular season titles: 3 (1987–88, 1988–89, 2001–02)
- Playoff championships: SJHL Champions: 1 (1987–88); Anavet Cup: 1 (1988); Centennial Cup: 1 (1988)

The Notre Dame Hounds were a Canadian Junior A ice hockey team based in Wilcox, Saskatchewan. The team was affiliated with Athol Murray College of Notre Dame, a private boarding school established in 1920 and later renamed after Athol Murray, who directed the school and founded its hockey program. The Hounds were members of the Saskatchewan Junior Hockey League and played their home games in Duncan McNeill Arena. The team became national champions in 1988, representing Western Canada and winning the Centennial Cup. The Hounds also operated successful Minor AAA teams over the course of their history. The Hounds hockey program was notable for producing a number of players who have gone on to National Hockey League careers. The Hounds were relocated to Warman, Saskatchewan in 2025, becoming the Warman Wolverines.

== History ==
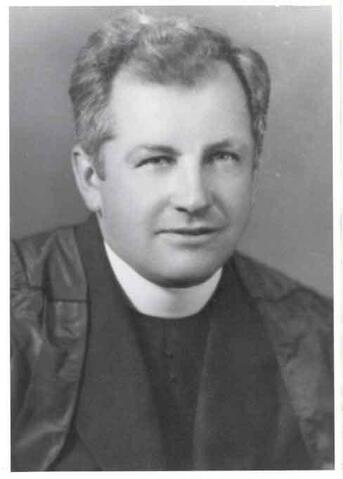
Athol Murray c. 1930.

=== Establishment ===
The Notre Dame Hounds were founded by Athol Murray out of the College of Notre Dame, which was renamed after Murray in 1981. Murray moved to Regina from Toronto in 1922, where he had earlier established the Argos sports club, and he brought many students with him to Saskatchewan and founded the Regina Argos program. Murray was assigned to Wilcox in 1933 and began teaching at St. Augustine School, which had been established in 1920 by the Sisters of Charity of St. Louis, where he would found the College of Notre Dame in 1933. He brought his love of hockey with him—Murray was known to say, "I love God, Canada, and hockey—not always in that order." Murray coached the team until 1947.

=== Minor hockey ===
The Hounds hockey team joined the Saskatchewan Junior Hockey League (SJHL) in 1970, although the team struggled to compete and the arrangement lasted only until 1976. After that, the team operated as a AAA minor hockey team for more than a decade. In 1980, the team won the national championship, the Air Canada Cup, defeating the Ste. Foy Governors in the final by a score of 5–1. The team returned to the final in 1984, and won the tournament for a second time in 1986, defeating the Toronto Red Wings by a score of 8–5. In 1987, the Hounds returned to the final for a fourth time. Despite losing the final, the organization decided to move up a level, returning to Junior A hockey, and the Hounds were promoted back to the SJHL in 1987.

After the promotion, the Hounds continued to operate their AAA team, which went on to further success, including back-to-back national titles in 2009 and 2010, and a record fifth national championship in 2018. Starting in the 1990s, the Hounds also operated a successful AAA girls' team. The team played in the national championships in 2010 and 2011, finishing second in 2010 and winning the 2011 Esso Cup as national champions. In 2022, both the boys' and girls' Hounds squads advanced to their respective national championships in the same season for the first time since 2010.

=== Saskatchewan Junior Hockey League ===
The Hounds' first season back in the SJHL, 1987–88, would prove to be the most successful in club history, despite most of the players still being under-18s. Coached by Barry MacKenzie and boasting future National Hockey League (NHL) stars Rod Brind'Amour and Curtis Joseph, the team won 53 out of 60 games and defeated the Yorkton Terriers for the SJHL title. The team then swept the Winnipeg South Blues for the right to contest the Western Canadian Abbott Cup title, in which they faced the Calgary Canucks. Despite falling behind three games to one, the Hounds defeated the Canucks in seven games—which included Joseph saving a penalty shot with two seconds remaining in game seven—to win the Abbott Cup and proceed to the Centennial Cup national championship. The Hounds, newly promoted to the Junior A ranks, were the youngest team in the history of the tournament. The Hounds advanced to the tournament final, where they defeated the Halifax Lions by a score of 3–2, with Dwayne Norris scoring the game-winning goal in the third period to secure the national championship. Brind'Amour led the tournament in scoring and was named its most valuable player. In 2013, the 1987–88 Hounds squad was inducted into the Saskatchewan Sports Hall of Fame.

Although the Hounds topped the SJHL standings the following season, they fell short of defending their title. The team's most successful season after 1988 came in 2014–15, when they returned to the league final, losing to the Melfort Mustangs.

The Hounds were noted for producing a large number of NHL alumni over many decades, such as Brind'Amour, Joseph, Wendel Clark, Vincent Lecavalier, and Morgan Rielly. More than one hundred former Hounds have been drafted to the NHL. During the 1985–86 NHL season, the Toronto Maple Leafs iced three former Hounds on one line, with the forward grouping of Clark, Gary Leeman, and Russ Courtnall being christened the "Hound Line". As it happened, the three had never played on a line with the Hounds, as Clark played defence until joining the Maple Leafs. The 2015 Stanley Cup Finals between the Chicago Blackhawks and Tampa Bay Lightning featured four Hounds alumni in Lightning coach Jon Cooper and defenceman Braydon Coburn and Blackhawks players Scott Darling and Brad Richards. In addition to NHL draft picks, many Hounds have gone on to play in the American National Collegiate Athletic Association (NCAA); nineteen members of the 1987–88 team—nearly the entire roster—were given NCAA scholarships.

In February 2025, the SJHL conditionally approved the sale and relocation of the Junior A Hounds to Warman. The league cited financial strains as the main factor in the sale of the storied team. The sale was completed in March and the team was re-branded as the Warman Wolverines ahead of the 2025–26 season. Despite giving up the Junior A team, the school actually expanded its hockey program by adding AA boys and girls teams.

=== Abuse allegations ===
Since 2021, the Hounds organization has been the subject of allegations of physical and sexual abuse by players who attended Notre Dame College and played hockey there in the 1980s. Todd Tisdale, whose brother Tim had starred for the Hounds in 1986, made the first public allegations in late 2021. Tisdale described a culture of hazing at the College, and accused officials there of ignoring and enabling physical and sexual violence. Tisdale pursued an apology from the school in the 1990s and in 2018 filed a statement of claim against the school; he re-filed in 2022, adding a second student to the claim. Other students who participated in the program in the 1980s followed suit with public allegations, including Kenny Wray and Jason Duckworth.

== Season-by-season record (SJHL) ==
GP = Games Played, W = Wins, L = Losses, T = Ties, OTL = Overtime Losses, GF = Goals For, GA = Goals Against, P = Points

| Season | GP | W | L | T | OTL | GF | GA | P | Results | Playoffs |
| 1970–71 | 35 | 3 | 32 | 0 | - | 102 | 251 | 6 | 7th SJHL | Did not qualify |
| 1971–72 | 38 | 16 | 22 | 0 | - | 162 | 223 | 28 | 8th SJHL | Lost quarterfinal, 0–4 (Olympics) |
| 1972–73 | 48 | 18 | 30 | 0 | - | 255 | 327 | 16 | 5th SJHL South | DNQ |
| 1973–74 | 50 | 19 | 29 | 2 | - | 207 | 244 | 40 | 5th SJHL South | DNQ |
| 1974–75 | 57 | 20 | 36 | 1 | - | 256 | 332 | 41 | 5th SJHL South | DNQ |
| 1975–76 | 58 | 7 | 50 | 1 | - | 131 | 390 | 15 | 6th SJHL South | DNQ |
| 1987–88 | 60 | 53 | 5 | 2 | - | 321 | 160 | 108 | 1st SJHL | Won League; Won ANAVET Cup; Won Abbott Cup; Won Centennial Cup |
| 1988–89 | 64 | 44 | 16 | 4 | - | 338 | 223 | 92 | 1st SJHL | Won quarterfinal, 4–2 (Americans); Lost semifinal, 2–4 (Hawks) |
| 1989–90 | 68 | 24 | 43 | 1 | - | 253 | 331 | 49 | 6th SJHL South | DNQ |
| 1990–91 | 68 | 31 | 34 | 3 | - | 265 | 266 | 65 | 4th SJHL North | Lost quarterfinal, 0–4 (Terriers) |
| 1991–92 | 64 | 32 | 24 | 8 | - | 259 | 251 | 72 | 5th SJHL South | DNQ |
| 1992–93 | 64 | 25 | 31 | 8 | - | 266 | 259 | 58 | 5th SJHL South | DNQ |
| 1993–94 | 68 | 25 | 36 | 7 | - | 277 | 280 | 57 | 5th SJHL South | Lost quarterfinal, 1–4 (Red Wings) |
| 1994–95 | 64 | 24 | 36 | 4 | - | 270 | 275 | 52 | 7th SJHL South | DNQ |
| 1995–96 | 64 | 18 | 37 | 9 | - | 215 | 264 | 45 | 5th SJHL South | Lost quarterfinal, 0–4 (Terriers) |
| 1996–97 | 64 | 29 | 35 | 0 | - | 223 | 264 | 58 | 3rd SJHL South | Lost quarterfinal, 2–4 (Eagles) |
| 1997–98 | 64 | 27 | 31 | 6 | - | 205 | 203 | 60 | 4th SJHL South | Lost quarterfinal, 2–4 (Eagles) |
| 1998–99 | 66 | 40 | 20 | 6 | - | 228 | 179 | 86 | 3rd SJHL South | Won quarterfinal, 4–3 (Terriers); Lost semifinal, 1–4 (Bruins) |
| 1999–00 | 60 | 23 | 28 | 9 | - | 150 | 181 | 55 | 4th SJHL South | Lost quarterfinal, 2–4 (Red Wings) |
| 2000–01 | 62 | 23 | 34 | 4 | 1 | 173 | 228 | 51 | 4th SJHL Sherwood | Lost quarterfinal, 0–4 (Red Wings) |
| 2001–02 | 64 | 38 | 16 | 7 | 3 | 245 | 166 | 86 | 1st SJHL | Won quarterfinal, 4–2 (Red Wings); Lost semifinal, 1–4 (Broncos) |
| 2002–03 | 60 | 31 | 19 | 6 | 4 | 203 | 186 | 72 | 1st SJHL Sherwood | Lost quarterfinal, 2–4 (Millionaires) |
| 2003–04 | 60 | 25 | 26 | 6 | 3 | 202 | 193 | 59 | 2nd SJHL Sherwood | Lost quarterfinal, 1–4 (Red Wings) |
| 2004–05 | 55 | 31 | 17 | 7 | 0 | 185 | 138 | 69 | 3rd SJHL Sherwood | Lost quarterfinal, 0–4 (Terriers) |
| 2005–06 | 55 | 31 | 17 | 5 | 2 | 192 | 162 | 69 | 2nd SJHL Sherwood | Won quarterfinal, 4–0 (Millionaires); Lost semifinal, 0–4 (Terriers) |
| 2006–07 | 58 | 24 | 23 | 0 | 11 | 202 | 234 | 59 | 4th SJHL Sherwood | Lost preliminary, 1–4 (Red Wings) |
| 2007–08 | 58 | 20 | 35 | - | 3 | 176 | 258 | 43 | 11th SJHL | DNQ |
| 2008–09 | 56 | 23 | 33 | - | 0 | 192 | 239 | 46 | 10th SJHL | DNQ |
| 2009–10 | 58 | 32 | 20 | - | 6 | 178 | 180 | 70 | 4th SJHL | Lost quarterfinal, 0–4 (Klippers) |
| 2010–11 | 58 | 21 | 30 | - | 7 | 158 | 196 | 49 | 11th SJHL | DNQ |
| 2011–12 | 58 | 22 | 33 | - | 3 | 172 | 233 | 47 | 5th Sherwood Div; 10th SJHL | Lost preliminary round, 0–3 (Bruins) |
| 2012–13 | 54 | 21 | 27 | - | 6 | 164 | 173 | 48 | 3rd Sherwood Div; 6th SJHL | Lost quarterfinals, 3–4 (Millionaires) |
| 2013–14 | 56 | 22 | 27 | - | 7 | 136 | 175 | 51 | 4th Kramer Div; 9th SJHL | Lost quarterfinals, 1–4 (Terriers) |
| 2014–15 | 56 | 37 | 14 | 1 | 4 | 165 | 133 | 79 | 2nd of 4 Kramer Div; 3rd of 12 SJHL | Won quarterfinals, 4–3 (Bombers); Won semifinals, 4–2 (Klippers); Lost final, 0–4 (Mustangs) |
| 2015–16 | 58 | 22 | 29 | 4 | 3 | 163 | 218 | 51 | 3rd of 4 Finning Div; 9th of 12 SJHL | Lost wildcard, 1–3 (Klippers) |
| 2016–17 | 58 | 26 | 23 | 7 | 2 | 174 | 167 | 51 | 3rd of 4 Finning Div; 7th of 12 SJHL | Won wildcard, 3–1 (Mustangs); Lost quarterfinal, 1–4 (Bombers) |
| 2017–18 | 58 | 29 | 24 | 1 | 4 | 192 | 174 | 63 | 4th of 4 Global Ag Div; 8th of 12 SJHL | Lost wildcard, 1–2 (Bombers) |
| 2018–19 | 58 | 25 | 23 | 5 | 5 | 182 | 186 | 60 | 4th of 4 Nutrien Div; 9th of 12 SJHL | Lost wildcard, 1–2 (Terriers) |
| 2019–20 | 58 | 18 | 32 | 5 | 3 | 135 | 192 | 44 | 4th of 4 Nutrien Div; 10th of 12 SJHL | DNQ |
| 2020–21 | 5 | 1 | 3 | 0 | 1 | 13 | 22 | 3 | SJHL season cancelled due to COVID-19 pandemic | |
| 2021–22 | 58 | 26 | 27 | 3 | 2 | 193 | 229 | 44 | 3rd of 4 Nutrien Div; 8th of 12 SJHL | Lost quarterfinal, 1–4 (Bruins) |
| 2022–23 | 58 | 22 | 28 | 4 | 2 | 176 | 219 | 50 | 3rd of 4 Nutrien Div; 9th of 12 SJHL | DNQ |
| 2023–24 | 56 | 15 | 39 | 2 | 0 | 152 | 262 | 32 | 4th of 4 Nutrien Div; 12th of 12 SJHL | DNQ |
| 2024–25 | 56 | 12 | 40 | 2 | 2 | 137 | 256 | 28 | 4th of 4 Nutrien Div; 12th of 12 SJHL | DNQ |

1987–88 championship playoffs

- 1988 Won SJHL, ANAVET Cup, Abbott Cup, and Centennial Cup

Hounds defeated Weyburn Red Wings, 4-games-to-0
Hounds defeated Nipawin Hawks, 4-games-to-0
Hounds defeated Yorkton Terriers, 4-games-to-2 (SJHL Champions)
Hounds defeated Winnipeg South Blues (MJHL), 4-games-to-0 (ANAVET CUP Champions)
Hounds defeated Calgary Canucks (AJHL), 4-games-to-3 (Abbott Cup Champions)
Second in 1988 Centennial Cup round robin (2–1)
Hounds defeated Pembroke Lumber Kings (CJHL), 7–3 in semifinal
Hounds defeated Halifax Lions (MVJHL), 3–2 in final (Centennial Cup Champions)

== Notable alumni ==
Over 215 Hounds alumni have been signed or drafted by an NHL team.

- Rod Brind'Amour (player & coach)
- Wendel Clark
- Braydon Coburn
- Jon Cooper (coach)
- Scott Daniels
- Cale Fleury
- Haydn Fleury
- Jason Herter
- Curtis Joseph
- Vincent Lecavalier
- Brooks Macek
- Stefan Matteau
- Curtis McElhinney
- Joby Messier
- Mitch Messier
- Scott Munroe
- Tyler Myers
- Dwayne Norris
- Myles O'Connor
- Scott Pellerin
- Teddy Purcell
- Brad Richards
- Nick Weiss
- Jaden Schwartz
- Barry Trotz (coach)

== See also ==
- List of ice hockey teams in Saskatchewan
- Ice hockey in Saskatchewan

| Preceded by Richmond Sockeyes | Centennial Cup Champions; 1988 | Succeeded by Thunder Bay Flyers |
