= Vancouver Villas =

- City: Vancouver, British Columbia
- League: BC Junior Hockey League
- Operated: 1969–73

Franchise history
- 1969–72: Vancouver Centennials
- 1972-73: Vancouver Villas

The Vancouver Villas were a junior ice hockey team based in Vancouver, British Columbia that played four seasons in the BCJHL from 1969-73. The franchise played for three seasons as the "Centennials" and became the Villas for the 1972-73 season before folding.

== Season-by-season Record ==
Note: GP = Games played, W = Wins, L = Losses, T = Ties Pts = Points, GF = Goals for, GA = Goals against

| Season | GP | W | L | T | GF | GA | Points | Finish | Playoffs |
| 1969-70 | 48 | 27 | 13 | 8 | 205 | 152 | 62 | 3rd League | Lost in Semifinals 1-4 (Essos) |
| 1970-71 | 60 | 30 | 19 | 11 | 275 | 215 | 71 | 2nd Central | Lost in Finals 2-4 (Rockets) |
| 1971-72 | 60 | 17 | 29 | 14 | n/a | n/a | 38 | 6th League | Did not qualify |
| 1972-73 | 62 | 18 | 43 | 1 | 244 | 355 | 37 | 3rd Central | Lost in Semifinals 1-4 (Bruins) |

== See also ==
- List of ice hockey teams in British Columbia
