= Vernon Vipers =

Canadian junior ice hockey team founded 1961

- City: Vernon, British Columbia, Canada
- League: British Columbia Hockey League
- Conference: Interior
- Founded: 1961–62
- Home arena: Kal Tire Place
- Colours: Dark Navy, Gold,
- Owner: Tom Glen
- General manager: Matt Cooke
- Head coach: Matt Cooke
- Website: www.vipers.bc.ca/

Franchise history
- 1961–1962: Vernon Jr. Canadians
- 1962–1967: Vernon Blades
- 1967–1973: Vernon Essos
- 1973–1978: Vernon Vikings
- 1978–1980: Vernon Canadians
- 1980–1995: Vernon Lakers
- 1995–present: Vernon Vipers

The Vernon Vipers are a junior "A" ice hockey team based in Vernon, British Columbia, Canada. They are members of the Interior Conference of the British Columbia Hockey League (BCHL). They play their home games at Kal Tire Place.

== History ==
The Vernon Jr. Canadians, Penticton Jr. Vees, Kelowna Buckaroos and Kamloops Rockets, four junior "B" teams, formed the Okanagan-Mainline Junior Hockey League in 1961 on the advice and determination of Canadians owner Bill Brown.

After their inaugural season the Canadians changed their name to "Vernon Blades" and kept that name until the start of the 1967–68 season.

In the playoffs of 1970 the "Vernon Essos", as they were called, captured the league championship and Mowat Cup (BC). They also automatically advanced to the Abbott Cup (Western Canada) because the AJHL champions did not want to contest for the BC/Alta Championship (now called the Doyle Cup). In the 1970 Abbott Cup, the Weyburn Red Wings of the Saskatchewan Junior Hockey League defeated Vernon four games to none.

The Essos repeated as league champions and Mowat Cup winners in 1972, only to lose to the Red Deer Rustlers for the BC/Alta Championship, 4 games to 2.

For the start of the 1973–74 season the Vernon Essos became the Vernon Vikings. They remained the Vikings until the end of the 1977–78 season. The team took a leave of absence for the 1979–80 season.

In the 1980–81 season, as the Vernon Lakers, the team only won 8 games out of the 56 played. They next season, they won only 10 of 47 games. It was not until the 1982–83 season that Lakers began to gradually improve. In the 1988 playoffs, the team made it to the Doyle Cup. In 1989, the Lakers started the first of four consecutive trips to the National Championships, which saw them win two Centennial Cups (1990 and 1991), three Abbott Cups, three Doyle Cups, four Mowat Cups, four league championships, and five conference championships.

In the 1990 Centennial Cup final, Vernon (as host) faced the heavily favored New Westminster Royals, who had previously defeated Vernon in the league finals. It was the first televised Centennial Cup Final. The game had New Westminster take the lead into the third period, 5–3 before Cam Sylven tied the game for the Lakers, 5–5, in the third period to force overtime. He scored once again in overtime on a breakaway for the 6–5 win and the first of two Centennial Cups for the Lakers.

The Lakers repeated as Centennial Cup winners in 1991 defeating the Sudbury Cubs of the Northern Ontario Junior Hockey League, 8–4. They also contested for the national finals in 1992, but lost in the semifinals to the Winkler Flyers of the Saskatchewan Junior Hockey League, 5–2.

The Vernon franchise would not return to the national tournament for another four years. In 1996, the team had rebranded as the Vernon Vipers and the trophy was the inaugural Royal Bank Cup. It was one of Vernon's best seasons as they finished the regular season with a 43–13–4 record. The Vipers defeated the Langley Thunder for the league title, four games to one, before defeating the Prince George Spruce Kings (Rocky Mountain Junior Hockey League) for the Mowat Cup, three games to none. They then faced the Saint Albert Saints (Alberta Junior Hockey League) team winning four games to three to claim the Doyle Cup.The Abbott Cup, which was now awarded during the Royal Bank Cup round-robin play, was given to Melfort Mustangs (Saskatchewan Junior Hockey League) as they defeated Vipers, 5–1. The Vipers had an even round-robin, winning two games and losing two. The Newmarket 87's of the Ontario Provincial Junior A Hockey League were the Vipers' next opponent in the semifinals, which they won, 7–4. In the final, the met the host Melfort Mustangs, avenging their lose in the semifinals, winning by a score of 2–0.

Three years after winning the inaugural Royal Bank Cup, Vernon won another in 1999. The Vipers finished the season with a 52–6–2 record, then went on to defeat the Chilliwack Chiefs for the league title, the Fred Page Cup. They won the Mowat Cup over the Kimberley Dynamiters (RMJHL) four games to one, but it was the first time a team from the Rocky Mountain Junior Hockey League defeated a team from the BCHL. The Doyle Cup was also won by Vernon, four games to one, over the Calgary Canucks (AJHL). The Vipers struggled in the Royal Bank Cup tournament, winning only once during round-robin play, but was enough to claim the Abbott Cup by defeating the Estevan Bruins (SJHL), 3–2. Vernon still managed to advance to the semifinals based on the one win and in that semifinals, the Bramalea Blues (OPJHL) were defeated by a score of 3–2. The Vipers then defeated the Charlottetown Abbies (Maritime Junior A Hockey League), 9–3, claiming the franchise's fourth national championship in ten years. The 1999 Viper team was inducted in the British Columbia Hockey Hall of Fame in 2016.

In the 2000–01 season, the Vernon Vipers failed to make the playoffs, the first time since 1982.

In 2009, the Vipers swept through the league playoffs, defeating the Penticton Vees four games to one, the Salmon Arm Silverbacks four games to two and the Powell River Kings four games to two, for the league championship. The Vernon Vipers then swept the regional and national series with ten straight wins and no losses. They defeated the Grande Prairie Storm for the Doyle Cup, and in the Royal Bank Cup Tournament they defeated all teams in the round-robin: the Kingston Voyageurs, 6–3, in the semifinal and the Humboldt Broncos, 2–0, in the final, winning the franchise's fifth national title and third Royal Bank Cup. With five national titles, Vernon is the only junior A franchise to have that distinction.

In 2010, the Vipers were league and divisional winners with 105 points, second all-time for the franchise, finishing with a league record of 51–6–0–3. Having avoided the elimination round, the Vipers met up with the fifth place Quesnel Millionaires in the quarterfinals, defeating them four games to two. The Penticton Vees were the Vipers' next opponent in the semifinals, also defeated by a result of four games to two. In the BCHL finals, the Vipers once again took on the Powell River Kings. The Kings took Vernon to a game seven, which the Vipers won by a score of 3–1, advancing to the Doyle Cup. The Doyle Cup series also went to seven games against the Spruce Grove Saints, with Vernon winning 7–3. The 2010 National Junior A Tournament was held in Dauphin, Manitoba. The Vernon Vipers record in the round-robin was 3–1 and advanced to the semifinal against the Brockville Braves, winning 2–0. In the final against the host team, the Dauphin Kings, the Vipers won 8–1, giving the Vernon Vipers their fourth Royal Bank Cup and sixth national championship for Vernon. The Vipers were the third team that had won back-to-back national championships, the previous two being in 1981 and 1982 Prince Albert Raiders and the 1990 and 1991 Vernon Lakers.

The Vernon Vipers fourth national title tied them with the Prince Albert Raiders, although it is the sixth for the franchise, a new Canadian record. In 2014, the Vipers were once again in the national tournament, as hosts, setting a record of ten appearances.

== Season-by-season history ==
Royal Bank Cup	Abbott Cup	Doyle Cup	Mowat Cup	League Champions

VERNON JUNIOR CANADIANS
Season	Division	Regular season (Note: Code explanation; GP—Games Played, W—Wins, L—Losses, T—Tied games, OTL—Overtime/Shootout losses, GF—Goals For, GA—Goals Against, Pts—Points)									Playoffs (Note: The result of the playoff series shows the team's result first regardless of the outcome, followed by opposite team in parentheses.)					
Season	Division	Finish	GP	W	L	T	OTL	Pts	GF	GA	GP	W	L	GF	GA	Result
1961–62	—	4th	29	7	21	1	—	15	95	182	5	2	3	14	17	Lost Semifinals, 2–3 (Buckaroos)
VERNON BLADES
Season	Division	Regular season									Playoffs					
Season	Division	Finish	GP	W	L	T	OTL	Pts	GF	GA	GP	W	L	GF	GA	Result
1962–63	—	3rd	31	9	22	0	—	18	114	145	5	1	4	21	24	Lost Semifinals, 1–4 (Buckaroos)
1963–64	—	3rd	34	7	27	0	—	14	124	219	7	2	5	24	45	Third place round robin
1964–65	—	4th	30	10	16	4	—	24	99	132	5	1	4	28	31	Lost Semifinals, 1–4 (Buckaroos)
1965–66	—	4th	30	4	25	1	—	9	100	212	4	0	4	16	35	Lost Semifinals, 0–4 (Kraft Kings)
1966–67	—	3rd	40	15	25	0	—	30	—	—	5	1	4	13	33	Lost Semifinals, 1–4 (Broncos)
VERNON ESSOS
Season	Division	Regular season									Playoffs					
Season	Division	Finish	GP	W	L	T	OTL	Pts	GF	GA	GP	W	L	GF	GA	Result
1967–68	—	3rd	40	19	17	4	—	42	213	218	4	0	4	10	21	Lost Semifinals, 0–4 (Broncos)
1968–69	—	3rd	40	19	15	6	—	44	177	191	4	0	4	11	28	Lost Semifinals, 0–4 (Cougars)
1969–70	—	1st	48	32	12	4	—	68	245	151	15	8	7	58	48	Won Semifinals, 4–1 (Centennials); Won Final, 4–2 (Cougars)
1969–70	—	1st	48	32	12	4	—	68	245	151	15	8	7	58	48	Mowat Cup, Automatic Winners
1969–70	—	1st	48	32	12	4	—	68	245	151	15	8	7	58	48	Lost Abbott Cup, 0–4 (Red Wings)
1970–71	Interior	2nd	60	34	20	6	—	74	285	248	5	1	4	14	19	Lost in Div. Semifinals, 1–4 (Rockets)
1971–72	—	1st	60	42	17	1	—	85	—	—	18	10	8	76	74	Won Semifinals, 4–1 (Bruins); Won Final, 4–3 (Broncos)
1971–72	—	1st	60	42	17	1	—	85	—	—	18	10	8	76	74	Mowat Cup, Automatic Winners
1971–72	—	1st	60	42	17	1	—	85	—	—	18	10	8	76	74	Lost Pacific Centennial Cup Regional, 2–4 (Rustlers)
1972–73	Interior	4th	61	27	33	1	—	55	292	287	5	1	4	23	31	Lost Div. Semifinals, 1–4 (Rockets)
VERNON VIKINGS
Season	Division	Regular season									Playoffs					
Season	Division	Finish	GP	W	L	T	OTL	Pts	GF	GA	GP	W	L	GF	GA	Result
1973–74	Interior	3rd	64	37	26	1	—	75	340	302	4	0	4	15	30	Lost Div. Semifinals, 0–4 (Broncos)
1974–75	Interior	3rd	66	31	33	2	—	64	327	343	10	4	6	46	50	Won Div. Semifinals, 4–2 (Broncos); Lost Div. Final, 0–4 (Buckaroos)
1975–76	—	1st	66	47	18	1	—	95	390	247	10 (Note: Both playoff series was a first to 8 points series which resulted in one tie game versus Penticton.)	4.5	5.5	48	36	Won Quarterfinals, 8pts–2pts (Bruins); Lost Semifinals, 1pt–9pts (Vees)
1976–77	Interior	3rd	68	29	37	2	—	60	259	321	6	2	4	21	36	Lost Div. Semifinals, 2–4 (Vees)
1977–78	Interior	6th	66	10	56	0	—	20	251	486	did not qualify					
VERNON CANADIANS
Season	Division	Regular season									Playoffs					
Season	Division	Finish	GP	W	L	T	OTL	Pts	GF	GA	GP	W	L	GF	GA	Result
1978–79	Interior	3rd	62	32	29	1	—	65	345	338	6	2	4	26	45	Lost Div. Semifinals, 2–4 (Rockets)
1979–80	Team took a leave of absence															
VERNON LAKERS
Season	Division	Regular season									Playoffs					
Season	Division	Finish	GP	W	L	T	OTL	Pts	GF	GA	GP	W	L	GF	GA	Result
1980–81	Interior	5th	56	8	48	0	—	16	205	435	did not qualify					
1981–82	Interior	5th	47	10	36	2	—	22	182	304	did not qualify					
1982–83	Interior	2nd	56	35	20	1	—	71	280	235	7	3	4	28	42	Lost Div. Semifinals, 3–4 (Knights)
1983–84	Interior	2nd	60	45	15	0	—	90	452	276	6	2	4	18	27	Lost Div. Semifinals, 2–4 (Buckaroos)
1984–85	Interior	2nd	51	28	21	2	—	58	261	262	7	3	4	32	43	Lost Div. Semifinals, 3–4 (Centennials)
1985–86	Interior	3rd	52	28	21	3	—	59	338	281	7	3	4	33	26	Lost Div. Semifinals, 3–4 (Packers)
1986–87	Interior	2nd	52	33	17	2	—	68	381	257	10	6	4	47	47	Won Div. Semifinals, 4–0 (Knights); Lost Div. Final, 2–4 (Packers)
1987–88	Interior	1st	52	42	10	0	—	84	381	216	19	14	5	120	74	Won Div. Semifinals, 4–0 (Centennials); Won Div. Final, 4–0 (Knights); Won BCJHL Final, 4–1 (Sockeyes)
1987–88	Interior	1st	52	42	10	0	—	84	381	216	19	14	5	120	74	Won Mowat Cup, 2–0 (North Stars)
1987–88	Interior	1st	52	42	10	0	—	84	381	216	19	14	5	120	74	Lost Doyle Cup, 0–4 (Canucks)
1988–89	Interior	1st	60	40	19	1	—	81	376	256	31	22	9	146	112	Won Div. Semifinals, 4–1 (Packers); Won Div. Final, 4–0 (Centennials); Won BCJHL Final, 4–1 (Royals)
1988–89	Interior	1st	60	40	19	1	—	81	376	256	31	22	9	146	112	Won Mowat Cup, 2–0 (Mustangs)
1988–89	Interior	1st	60	40	19	1	—	81	376	256	31	22	9	146	112	Won Doyle Cup, 4–2 (Rustlers)
1988–89	Interior	1st	60	40	19	1	—	81	376	256	31	22	9	146	112	Won Abbott Cup, 4–2 (Broncos)
1988–89	Interior	1st	60	40	19	1	—	81	376	256	31	22	9	146	112	4th place Centennial Cup round robin
1989–90	Interior	1st	58	33	20	5	—	71	330	229	19	12	7	92	73	1st place Interior round robin Lost BCJHL Final, 2–4 (Royals)
1989–90	Interior	1st	58	33	20	5	—	71	330	229	19	12	7	92	73	Second place Centennial Cup round robin Won Centennial Cup Semifinals, 11–5 (Hawks); Won Centennial Cup Final, 6–5 (OT) (Royals)
1990–91	Interior	3rd	60	37	20	3	—	77	359	266	28	23	5	170	126	Won Div. Semifinals, 4–0 (Spartans); Won Div. Final, 4–2 (Chiefs); Won .BCJHL Final, 4–0 (Paper Kings)
1990–91	Interior	3rd	60	37	20	3	—	77	359	266	28	23	5	170	126	Won Mowat Cup, 3–0 (Spruce Kings)
1990–91	Interior	3rd	60	37	20	3	—	77	359	266	28	23	5	170	126	Won Doyle Cup, 4–1 (Royals)
1990–91	Interior	3rd	60	37	20	3	—	77	359	266	28	23	5	170	126	Won Abbott Cup, 5–4 (OT) (Terriers)
1990–91	Interior	3rd	60	37	20	3	—	77	359	266	28	23	5	170	126	4th place Centennial Cup round robin Won Centennial Cup Semifinals, 7–5 (Terriers); Won Centennial Cup Final, 8–4 (Cubs)
1991–92	Interior	4th	60	34	23	3	—	71	348	286	30	22	8	168	116	Won Div. Semifinals, 4–2 (Spartans); Won Div. Final, 4–2 (Chiefs); Won BCJHL Final, 4–0 (Ice Hawks)
1991–92	Interior	4th	60	34	23	3	—	71	348	286	30	22	8	168	116	Won Mowat Cup, 3–0 (Spruce Kings)
1991–92	Interior	4th	60	34	23	3	—	71	348	286	30	22	8	168	116	Won Doyle Cup, 4–2 (Grizzlys)
1991–92	Interior	4th	60	34	23	3	—	71	348	286	30	22	8	168	116	Won Abbott Cup, 5–3 (Flyers)
1991–92	Interior	4th	60	34	23	3	—	71	348	286	30	22	8	168	116	1st place Centennial Cup round robin Lost Centennial Cup Semifinals, 2–5 (Flyers)
1992–93	Interior	3rd	60	35	23	2	—	72	336	278	5	1	4	14	22	Lost Div. Semifinals, 1–4 (Panthers)
1993–94	Interior	3rd	60	31	29	0	—	62	286	314	11	4	7	38	48	Won Div. Semifinals, 4–3 (Panthers); Lost Div. Final, 0–4 (Spartans)
1994–95	Interior	3rd	60	28	28	4	—	60	297	284	9	5	4	41	37	Won Prelim. Round, 2–0 (Ice Hawks); Lost Quarterfinals, 3–4 (Panthers)
VERNON VIPERS
Season	Division	Regular season									Playoffs					
Season	Division	Finish	GP	W	L	T	OTL	Pts	GF	GA	GP	W	L	GF	GA	Result
1995–96	Interior	1st	60	43	13	4	—	90	324	219	30	23	7	156	102	Won Quarterfinals, 4–1 (Clippers); Won Semifinals, 4–0 (Capitals); Won BCJHL Final, 4–1 (Thunder)
1995–96	Interior	1st	60	43	13	4	—	90	324	219	30	23	7	156	102	Won Mowat Cup, 3–0 (Spruce Kings)
1995–96	Interior	1st	60	43	13	4	—	90	324	219	30	23	7	156	102	Won Doyle Cup, 4–3 (Saints)
1995–96	Interior	1st	60	43	13	4	—	90	324	219	30	23	7	156	102	Lost Abbott Cup, 1–5 (Mustangs)
1995–96	Interior	1st	60	43	13	4	—	90	324	219	30	23	7	156	102	Third place Royal Bank Cup round robin Won Royal Bank Cup Semifinals, 7–4 (87's); Won Royal Bank Cup Final, 2–0 (Mustangs)
1996–97	Interior	1st	60	43	14	5	—	87	339	212	14	9	5	56	50	Won in Quarterfinals, 4–0 (Centennials); Won in Semifinals, 4–1 (Smoke Eaters); Lost in BCHL Final, 1–4 (Eagles)
1997–98	Interior	2nd	60	33	19	8	—	74	251	229	7	3	4	17	25	Lost in Quarterfinals, 3–4 (Smoke Eaters)
1998–99	Interior	1st	60	52	6	—	2	106	305	145	30	22	8	150	88	Won in Conference Semifinals, 4–1 (Centennials); Won in Conference Final, 4–0 (Spruce Kings); Won in BCHL Final, 4–1 (Chiefs)
1998–99	Interior	1st	60	52	6	—	2	106	305	145	30	22	8	150	88	Won in Mowat Cup, 3–1 (Dynamiters)
1998–99	Interior	1st	60	52	6	—	2	106	305	145	30	22	8	150	88	Won in Doyle Cup, 4–1 (Canucks)
1998–99	Interior	1st	60	52	6	—	2	106	305	145	30	22	8	150	88	Won in Abbott Cup, 3–2 (Mustangs)
1998–99	Interior	1st	60	52	6	—	2	106	305	145	30	22	8	150	88	Fourth place in Royal Bank Cup round robin Won in Royal Bank Cup Semifinals, 3–2 (Blues); Won in Royal Bank Cup Final, 9–3 (Abbies)
1999–00	Interior	2nd	60	35	20	—	5	75	242	216	18	9	9	56	64	Won in Conference Semifinals, 4–2 (Spruce Kings); Won in Conference Final, 4–3 (Centennials); Lost in BCHL Final, 1–4 (Chiefs)
2000–01	Interior	5th	60	24	26	—	10	58	203	225	did not qualify					
2001–02	Interior	1st	60	33	21	—	6	72	243	205	17	10	7	52	40	Won Conf. Quarterfinals, 4–0 (Centennials); Won Conf. Final, 4–3 (Panthers); Lost BCHL Final, 2–4 (Chiefs)
2002–03	Interior	1st	60	47	12	0	1	95	273	150	17	10	7	52	40	Won Conf. Quarterfinals, 4–0 (Panthers); Won Conf. Final, 4–0 (Smoke Eaters); Won BCHL Final, 4–0 (Chiefs)
2002–03	Interior	1st	60	47	12	0	1	95	273	150	17	10	7	52	40	Mowat Cup, Automatic Winners
2002–03	Interior	1st	60	47	12	0	1	95	273	150	17	10	7	52	40	Lost Doyle Cup, 2–4 (Kodiaks)
2003–04	Interior	2nd	60	37	15	1	7	82	233	182	5	1	4	13	17	Lost Conf. Quarterfinals, 1–4 (Smoke Eaters)
2004–05	Interior	1st	60	42	9	3	6	93	232	156	14	9	5	40	41	Won Conf. Semifinals, 4–0 (Vees); Won in Conference Final, 4–1 (Spruce Kings); Lost BCHL Final, 1–4 (Eagles)
2005–06	Interior	3rd	60	36	18	2	4	78	205	165	10	5	5	32	29	Won Conf. Quarterfinals, 4–1 (Spruce Kings); Lost Conf. Semifinals, 1–4 (Silverbacks)
2006–07	Interior	2nd	60	37	19	1	3	78	246	193	22	14	8	70	53	Won Conf. Quarterfinals, 4–2 (Warriors); Won Conf. Semifinals, 4–1 (Smoke Eaters); Won Conf. Final, 4–1 (Vees); Lost BCHL Final, 2–4 (Clippers)
2007–08	Interior	4th	60	36	20	2	2	76	238	185	10	6	4	35	31	Won Conf. Quarterfinals, 3–0 (Smoke Eaters); Lost Conf. Semifinals, 3–4 (Vees)
2008–09	Interior	1st	60	42	14	1	3	88	223	145	25	20	5	152	90	Won Conf. Semifinals, 4–1 (Vees); Won Conf. Final, 4–2 (Silverbacks); Won BCHL Final, 4–2 (Kings)
2008–09	Interior	1st	60	42	14	1	3	88	223	145	25	20	5	152	90	Mowat Cup, Automatic Winners
2008–09	Interior	1st	60	42	14	1	3	88	223	145	25	20	5	152	90	Won Doyle Cup, 4–0 (Storm)
2008–09	Interior	1st	60	42	14	1	3	88	223	145	25	20	5	152	90	1st place Royal Bank Cup RR; Won Royal Bank Cup Semifinals, 6–3 (Voyageurs); Won Royal Bank Cup Final, 2–0 (Broncos)
2009–10	Interior	1st	60	51	6	0	3	105	298	119	32	21	11	117	77	Won Conf. Semifinals, 4–2 (Millionaires); Won Conf. Final, 4–2 (Vees); Won BCHL Final, 4–3 (Kings)
2009–10	Interior	1st	60	51	6	0	3	105	298	119	32	21	11	117	77	Mowat Cup, Automatic Winners
2009–10	Interior	1st	60	51	6	0	3	105	298	119	32	21	11	117	77	Won Doyle Cup, 4–3 (Saints)
2009–10	Interior	1st	60	51	6	0	3	105	298	119	32	21	11	117	77	2nd place Royal Bank Cup RR; Won Royal Bank Cup Semifinals, 2–0 (Braves); Won Royal Bank Cup Final, 8–1 (Kings)
2010–11	Interior	1st	60	36	11	4	9	85	197	141	28	21	7	93	59	Won Conf. Semifinals, 4–2 (Warriors); Won Conf. Final, 4–2 (Silverbacks); Won BCHL Final, 4–0 (Kings)
2010–11	Interior	1st	60	36	11	4	9	85	197	141	28	21	7	93	59	Mowat Cup, Automatic Winners
2010–11	Interior	1st	60	36	11	4	9	85	197	141	28	21	7	93	59	Won Doyle Cup, 4–3 (Saints)
2010–11	Interior	1st	60	36	11	4	9	85	197	141	28	21	7	93	59	1st Place Royal Bank Cup RR (4–0); Won RBC Semifinal vs (Dukes) 4–1; Lost RBC Final vs (Kings) 2–0
2011–12	Interior	5th	60	30	27	1	2	63	208	193	did not qualify					
2012–13	Interior	6th	56	21	25	1	9	52	139	170	did not qualify					
2013–14	Interior	3rd	58	30	18	4	6	70	187	175	19	10	9	66	58	Won Div. Semifinals, 4–2 (Warriors); Won Div. Final, 4–3 (Vees); Won Semifinal Round Robin 2–0; Lost BCHL Final, 0–4 (Express)
2014–15	Interior; BCHL	2nd 4th	58	36	18	1	3	76	218	161	11	7	4	32	31	Won Div. Semifinals, 0–4 (Centennials); Lost Div. Final, 3–4 (Vees)
2015–16	Interior; BCHL	4th 12th	58	24	31	0	3	51	179	206	5	1	4	9	21	Lost Div. Semifinal, 1–4 (Vees)
2016–17	Interior; BCHL	2 of 6; 6 of 17	58	30	19	4	5	69	181	158	12	7	5	40	27	Won Div. Semifinals, 4–1 (Smoke Eaters); Lost Div. Finals, 3–4 (Vees)
2017–18	Interior; BCHL	2 of 7; 2 of 17	58	39	14	4	1	83	205	118	10	5	5	24	19	Won Div. Quarterfinals, 4–0 (Silverbacks); Lost Div. Semifinals, 2–4 (Wild)
2018–19	Interior; BCHL	4 of 7; 8 of 17	58	26	21	—	11	63	166	160	5	4	1	13	11	Won First Round, 4–1 (Silverbacks); Won Second Round, 4–3 (Smoke Eaters); Won Semifinals, 4–1 (Wild); Lost BCHL Finals, 0–4 (Spruce Kings)
2019–20	Interior; BCHL	5 of 7; 8 of 17	58	30	24	0	4	64	174	178	5	4	1	22	11	Won First Round, 4–1 (Wild); Playoffs Cancelled (COVID-19 pandemic)
2020–21	Pod	1 of 3	20	13	6	-	1	28	69	55	Pod Season Only, No Playoffs					
2021–22	Interior; BCHL	6 of 9; 10 of 18	54	27	23	-	4	61	152	154	5	1	4	14	26	Won First Round, 4-1 (Warriors)
2022–23	Interior; BCHL	7 of 9; 11 of 18	54	27	21	-	6	60	160	164	11	5	6	36	36	Won Div. Quarterfinal, 4-2 (Warriors); Lost Div. Semifinal, 1–4 (Silverbacks)
2023–24	Interior; BCHL	4 of 8; 6 of 17	54	33	19	-	2	68	196	160	10	5	5	28	25	Won Div. Quarterfinal, 4-1 (Smoke Eaters); Lost Div. Semifinal, 1–4 (Vees)
2024-25	Int. West; Int. Conf. BCHL	5 of 5; 10 of 11; 19 of 21	54	15	33	-	6	36	162	230	-	-	-	-	-	Did Not Qualify
2025-26	Int. West; Int. Conf. BCHL	5 of 5; 10 of 10; 18 of 20	54	15	32	-	7	37	167	223	-	-	-	-	-	Did Not Qualify

== Notable alumni ==
=== Alumni who played in the National Hockey League ===
- Ron Areshenkoff
- Murray Baron
- Ryan Bayda
- Ron Delorme
- Dallas Drake
- Todd Ewen
- Bob Gassoff
- Chay Genoway
- Derek Gustafson
- Andrew Hammond
- Jerry Holland
- Ken Holland
- Dane Jackson
- Ed Johnstone
- Connor Jones
- Scott King
- Bill Lindsay
- Jason Marshall
- Bruce Major
- Darcy Martini
- Vic Mercredi
- Glen Metropolit
- Sandy Moger
- Don Murdoch
- David Oliver
- Rich Parent
- Rod Pelley
- Rudy Poeschek
- Dale Purinton
- Terry Ryan
- Mike Santorelli
- Kevin Sawyer
- Corey Spring
- Clayton Stoner
- Tyson Strachan
- Aaron Volpatti
- Matt Watkins
- Tiger Williams
- Matt Zaba
- Mike Zalewski

== See also ==
- List of ice hockey teams in British Columbia

Preceded by Thunder Bay Flyers	Centennial Cup Champions; 1990 and 1991	Succeeded by Thunder Bay Flyers
Preceded by Calgary Canucks	Royal Bank Cup Champions; 1996	Succeeded by Summerside Western Capitals
Preceded by South Surrey Eagles	Royal Bank Cup Champions; 1999	Succeeded by Fort McMurray Oil Barons
Preceded by Humboldt Broncos	Royal Bank Cup Champions; 2009 and 2010	Succeeded by Pembroke Lumber Kings
