= 2008–09 BCHL season =

- League: British Columbia Hockey League
- Sport: Ice hockey
- Duration: Regular season September – February; Postseason; February – April
- Games: 60
- Teams: 16

Regular season
- Season champions: Victoria Grizzlies
- Top scorer: Mark Zengerle (Salmon Arm Silverbacks)

Playoffs
- Finals champions: Vernon Vipers
- Runners-up: Powell River Kings

BCHL seasons
- ← 2007–08 2009–10 →

The 2008–09 BCHL season was the 47th season of the British Columbia Hockey League (BCHL). The 16 teams of the Coastal and Interior divisions each played 60 season games. The Vernon Vipers finished the regular season in 1st place overall. The Vernon Vipers defeated the Powell River Kings in 6 games to win the league championship Fred Page Cup. The Vernon Vipers then went on to sweep the AJHL championship Grande Prairie Storm in the Doyle Cup, before going on to win their record-breaking 5th national championship at the 2009 Royal Bank Cup.

== Standings ==
Map of BCHL, 2008–09
Island Division
Mainland Division
Interior Division

Note: GP = Games Played, W = Wins, L = Losses, OTL = Overtime Losses, PTS = Points

Island division
TEAM NAMES	GP	W	L	T	OTL	Pts
Victoria Grizzlies	60	43	13	1	3	90
Cowichan Valley Capitals	60	34	20	1	5	74
Nanaimo Clippers	60	28	24	2	6	64
Alberni Valley Bulldogs	60	16	36	1	7	40
Mainland division
TEAM NAMES	GP	W	L	T	OTL	PTS
Powell River Kings	60	39	16	1	4	83
Langley Chiefs	60	30	25	2	3	65
Surrey Eagles	60	28	25	1	6	63
Burnaby Express	60	18	35	1	6	43
Interior division
TEAM NAMES	GP	W	L	T	OTL	PTS
Vernon Vipers	60	42	14	1	3	88
Salmon Arm Silverbacks	60	40	17	1	2	83
Westside Warriors	60	37	18	1	4	79
Penticton Vees	60	36	17	0	7	79
Prince George Spruce Kings	60	26	25	3	6	61
Trail Smoke Eaters	60	25	31	2	2	54
Quesnel Millionaires	60	16	40	0	4	36
Merritt Centennials	60	13	44	0	3	29

== Post-season ==
=== 2009 BCHL Fred Page Cup playoffs ===
First round
Prince George	2
Penticton	3
Trail	0
Westside	3
Langley	1
Surrey	3
Nanaimo	0
Cowichan Valley	3

Quarter-finals
Penticton	1
Vernon	4
Westside	1
Salmon Arm	4
Powell River	4
Surrey	1
Victoria	4
Cowichan Valley	3

Semi-finals
Vernon	4
Salmon Arm	2
Powell River	4
Victoria	3

Fred Page Cup Final
Vernon	4
Powell River	2

== Scoring leaders ==
GP = Games Played, G = Goals, A = Assists, P = Points

Player	Team	GP	G	A	P
Mark Zengerle	Salmon Arm Silverbacks	60	33	87	120
Darcy Oakes	Powell River Kings	54	38	53	91
Conor Morrison	Salmon Arm Silverbacks	50	39	45	84
Kyle Bodie	Powell River Kings	55	28	55	83
Erik Vos	Powell River Kings	55	35	41	76
Clay Harvey	Powell River Kings	55	36	38	74
Milos Gordic	Langley Chiefs	52	40	31	71
Trever Hertz	Victoria Grizzlies	60	35	38	73
Keenan Desmet	Salmon Arm Silverbacks	58	26	41	67
Curtis McKenzie	Penticton Vees	53	30	34	64

== Leading goaltenders ==
Note: GP = Games Played, Mins = Minutes Played, W = Wins, L = Losses, T = Ties, Mins = Minutes Played, GA = Goals Against, SO = Shutouts, GAA = Goals Against Average, SV% = Save Percentage

Player	Team	GP	W	L	T	Mins	GA	SO	GAA	SV%
Andrew Hammond	Vernon Vipers	43	28	12	1	2,479	94	6	2.28	0.913
Sean Bonar	Penticton Vees	39	28	9	0	2,252	99	4	2.64	.910
Tony Ierino	Salmon Arm Silverbacks	52	24	24	2	2,998	176	1	3.52	0.895
Carsen Chubak	Powell River Kings	36	26	10	0	2,072	88	1	2.55	0.906
Alexandre Peck	Victoria Grizzlies	19	13	5	0	1,070	46	1	2.58	0.907

== Award winners ==
- Brett Hull Trophy (Top Scorer):
  - Darcy Oakes (Powell River Kings)
- Top Defencemen:
  - Coastal division: Zach Currie (Cowichan Valley Capitals)
  - Interior division: Justin Schultz (Westside Warriors)
- Bruce Allison Memorial Trophy (Rookie of the Year):
  - Coastal division: Mat Bodie (Powell River Kings)
  - Interior division: Garrett Milan (Penticton Vees)
- Bob Fenton Trophy (Most Sportsmanlike):
  - Coastal division: Darcy Oakes (Powell River Kings)
  - Interior division: Conor Morrison (Salmon Arm Silverbacks)
- Best Goaltender:
  - Andrew Hammond (Vernon Vipers)
- Wally Forslund Memorial Trophy (Best Goaltending Duo):
  - Andrew Hammond & Graeme Gordon (Vernon Vipers)
- Vern Dye Memorial Trophy (regular-season MVP):
  - Coastal division: Chris Rawlings (Cowichan Valley Capitals)
  - Interior division: Mark Zengerle (Salmon Arm Silverbacks)
- Joe Tennant Memorial Trophy (Coach of the Year):
  - Coastal division: Kent Lewis (Powell River Kings)
  - Interior division: Mark Ferner (Vernon Vipers)
- Ron Boileau Memorial Trophy (Best Regular Season Record):
  - Victoria Grizzlies
- Cliff McNabb Memorial Trophy (Coastal Division Champions):
  - Powell River Kings
- Ryan Hatfield Trophy (Interior Division Champions):
  - Vernon Vipers
- Fred Page Cup (League Champions):
  - Vernon Vipers

== Players selected in 2009 NHL entry draft ==
- Kyle Bigos (Vernon Vipers)
- Spencer Bennett (Surrey Eagles)
- Curtis Mckenzie (Penticton Vees)
- Cam Reid (Westside Warriors)
- Curtis Gedig (Cowichan Valley Capitals)

== See also ==
- 2009 Royal Bank Cup
- 2009 in ice hockey
- 2010 in ice hockey
- 2009 NHL entry draft
