= Chilliwack Chiefs (1990–2006) =

- City: Chilliwack, British Columbia
- League: British Columbia Hockey League
- Conference: Coastal
- Founded: 1990
- Home arena: Prospera Centre
- Colours: Yellow, Black, White

Franchise history
- 1979–1990: Richmond Sockeyes
- 1990–2006: Chilliwack Chiefs
- 2006–2011: Langley Chiefs
- 2011–present: Langley Rivermen

The Chilliwack Chiefs were a Junior "A" ice hockey team from Chilliwack, British Columbia, Canada. They were a part of the British Columbia Hockey League and played in the Mainland Division/Coastal Conference.

The BCHL franchise was founded as the Richmond Sockeyes in 1972 in the Pacific Junior A Hockey League. In 1990, Sockeyes returned to the junior B level and sold the franchise to become the Chilliwack Chiefs. Chilliwack previously had teams such as the Chilliwack Bruins from 1970 until 1976, who moved to Maple Ridge, British Columbia, and the Chilliwack Colts from 1978 until 1981 who seem to have become the Langley Eagles and later the Chilliwack Eagles from 1987 until 1989.

Following the expansion of the Western Hockey League into Chilliwack with the Chilliwack Bruins, the franchise was sold and moved to Langley, where they became the Langley Chiefs. The former owners retained ownership of the Chiefs name and, in 2011, the Chiefs Development Group purchased the Quesnel Millionaires, which debuted as the Chilliwack Chiefs in the 2011–12 season.

== Season-by-season record ==
Note: GP = Games Played, W = Wins, L = Losses, T = Ties, OTL = Overtime Losses, GF = Goals for, GA = Goals against

Season	League	GP	W	L	T	OTL	GF	GA	Points	Finish	Playoffs
1990-91	BCJHL	60	39	18	3	-	361	323	81	1st in Interior	Lost in semi-finals
1991-92	BCJHL	60	38	19	3	-	305	259	79	2nd in Interior	Lost in semi-finals
1992-93	BCJHL	60	20	38	2	-	250	392	42	5th in Interior	DNQ
1993-94	BCJHL	60	28	28	4	-	339	332	60	4th in Interior	Lost in quarter-finals
1994-95	BCJHL	60	39	18	3	-	295	229	81	1st in Mainland	Won League, Mowat Cup
1995-96	BCJHL	60	44	12	4	-	330	219	92	1st in Mainland	Lost in semi-finals
1996-97	BCHL	60	32	27	1	-	245	265	65	5th in Coastal	Lost in quarter-finals
1997-98	BCHL	60	33	25	2	-	248	250	68	2nd in Coastal	Lost in semi-finals
1998-99	BCHL	60	35	20	OTW 3	2	354	272	78	2nd in Mainland	Lost in Finals
1999-00	BCHL	60	35	20	-	5	307	251	75	2nd in Mainland	Won League, Mowat Cup
2000-01	BCHL	60	34	22	-	4	274	249	72	2nd in Mainland	Lost in quarter-finals
2001-02	BCHL	60	46	10	-	4	341	212	96	1st in Mainland	Won League, Mowat Cup, Doyle Cup, lost semi-final of Royal Bank Cup
2002-03	BCHL	60	36	17	1	6	251	192	79	1st in Mainland	Lost in Finals
2003-04	BCHL	60	36	20	0	4	259	243	76	2nd in Mainland	Lost in semi-finals
2004-05	BCHL	60	37	21	0	2	231	187	76	2nd in Mainland	Lost in semi-finals
2005-06	BCHL	60	36	16	3	5	243	192	80	1st in Mainland	Lost in semi-finals

== NHL alumni ==
- John Craighead
- Wade Dubielewicz
- Joaquin Gage
- Gabe Gauthier
- Shawn Horcoff
- Jason Krog
- Mike Minard
- Darin Olver
- Mark Santorelli
- Garret Stroshein
- Jeff Tambellini
- David Van der Gulik

== See also ==
- Chilliwack Bruins (BCJHL)
- Langley Rivermen
- Chilliwack Bruins
- List of ice hockey teams in British Columbia
