= 1990 Centennial Cup =

Canadian junior ice hockey championship

1990 Manitoba Centennial Cup
Tournament details
- Venue: Vernon, British Columbia
- Dates: May 1990
- Teams: 5

Final positions
- Champions: Vernon Lakers (1st title)
- Runners-up: New Westminster Royals

Tournament statistics
- Games played: 13
- Scoring leader: Kelly Jones (New Westminster)

Awards
- MVP: Marc Alain Duchaine (Longueuil)

The 1990 Centennial Cup is the 20th Junior "A" 1990 ice hockey National Championship for the Canadian Junior Hockey League.

The Centennial Cup was competed for by the winners of the Doyle Cup, Anavet Cup, Dudley Hewitt Cup, the Callaghan Cup, and a host city.

The tournament was hosted by the Vernon Lakers and Vernon, British Columbia.

== The Playoffs ==
=== Round Robin ===
Pos	League (Ticket)	Team	Pld	W	L	GF	GA	GD	Qualification
1	BCJHL (Doyle Cup)	New Westminster Royals	4	4	0	28	8	+20	Semi-final
2	BCJHL (Host)	Vernon Lakers	4	3	1	19	9	+10	Semi-final
3	SJHL (Anavet Cup)	Nipawin Hawks	4	2	2	12	10	+2	Semi-final
4	QJAAAHL (Dudley Hewitt Cup)	Longueuil Collège Français	4	1	3	12	24	−12	Semi-final
5	MJAHL (Callaghan Cup)	Amherst Ramblers	4	0	4	7	27	−20	

==== Results ====
Vernon Lakers defeated Longueuil Sieurs 6-1
Nipawin Hawks defeated Amherst Ramblers 4-3 in overtime
New Westminster Royals defeated Longueuil Sieurs 11-3
New Westminster Royals defeated Amherst Ramblers 9-0
Vernon Lakers defeated Nipawin Hawks 2-1 in overtime
Nipawin Hawks defeated Longueuil Sieurs 5-2
New Westminster Royals defeated Vernon Lakers 5-3
Vernon Lakers defeated Amherst Ramblers 8-2
Longueuil Sieurs defeated Amherst Ramblers 6-2
New Westminster Royals defeated Nipawin Hawks 3-2 for the Abbott Cup

=== Semi-finals and Final ===
Semi-finals
1	New Westminster Royals	10
4	Longueuil Sieurs	4
2	Vernon Lakers	11
3	Nipawin Hawks	5

Centennial Cup Finals
1	New Westminster Royals	5
2	Vernon Lakers	6

Please note: Final was won in overtime.

== Awards ==
Most Valuable Player: Marc Alain Duchaine (Longueuil Sieurs)
Top Scorer: Kelly Jones (New Westminster Royals)
Most Sportsmanlike Player: Kelly Jones (New Westminster Royals)

=== All-Star Team ===
Forward

Mark Karpen (New Westminster Royals)
David Oliver (Vernon Lakers)
Al Wonitowy (Nipawin Hawks)

Defence

Andrew Wolf (New Westminster Royals)
Dean Zayonce (Vernon Lakers)

Goal

Lauren Belland (Nipawin Hawks)

== Roll of League Champions ==
AJHL: Calgary Canucks
BCJHL: New Westminster Royals
CJHL: Hawkesbury Hawks
IJHL: Charlottetown Abbies
MJHL: Portage Terriers
MVJHL: Amherst Ramblers
NOJHL: Sudbury Cubs
PCJHL: Prince George Spruce Kings
QPJHL: Longueuil Collège Français
SJHL: Nipawin Hawks
SJJHL: Avalon Jr. Capitals

== See also ==
- Canadian Junior A Hockey League
- Royal Bank Cup
- Anavet Cup
- Doyle Cup
- Dudley Hewitt Cup
- Fred Page Cup
- Abbott Cup
- Mowat Cup
