= Chilliwack Bruins (disambiguation) =

The Chilliwack Bruins were a major junior team in the Western Hockey League from 2006 to 2011.

Chilliwack Bruins may also refer to:

- Chilliwack Bruins (BCJHL), a junior "A" team in the British Columbia Junior Hockey League from 1970 to 1976
- Chilliwack Bruins, a junior "A" team in the Pacific Junior A Hockey League from 1976 to 1978
