= 2009–10 BCHL season =

- League: British Columbia Hockey League
- Sport: Ice hockey
- Duration: Regular season September – February; Postseason; February – April
- Games: 60
- Teams: 17

Fred Page Cup
- League champions: Vernon Vipers
- Runners-up: Powell River Kings

Doyle Cup
- Western Canada champions: Vernon Vipers
- Western Canada runners-up: Spruce Grove Saints

Royal Bank Cup
- Champions: Vernon Vipers
- Runners-up: Dauphin Kings

BCHL seasons
- ← 2008–09 2010–11 →

The 2009–10 BCHL season was the 48th season of the British Columbia Hockey League (BCHL). The 17 teams of the Coastal and Interior divisions each played 60 season games. The BCHL All-Star Game was hosted by Nanaimo. The Vernon Vipers finished the regular season in 1st place overall. The Vernon Vipers defeated the Powell River Kings in 7 games to win the league championship Fred Page Cup. The Vernon Vipers then went on to defeat the AJHL championship Spruce Grove Saints in 7 games to win the Doyle Cup, before going on to win the 2010 Royal Bank Cup national championship.

== League changes ==
The Williams Lake TimberWolves returned from a two-year leave of absence to play its last season.

== Standings ==
Note: GP = Games Played, W = Wins, L = Losses, OTL = Overtime Losses, PTS = Points

Coastal division
TEAM NAMES	GP	W	L	OTL	T	Pts
Alberni Valley Bulldogs	60	45	12	2	1	93
Powell River Kings	60	36	17	6	1	79
Victoria Grizzlies	60	34	18	6	2	76
Langley Chiefs	60	33	22	3	2	71
Surrey Eagles	60	30	24	6	0	66
Nanaimo Clippers	60	24	25	10	1	59
Cowichan Valley Capitals	60	25	32	3	0	53
Burnaby Express	60	18	36	6	0	42
Interior division
TEAM NAMES	GP	W	L	OTL	T	Pts
Vernon Vipers	60	51	6	3	0	105
Penticton Vees	60	48	8	4	0	100
Westside Warriors	60	38	18	3	1	80
Salmon Arm Silverbacks	60	29	25	3	3	64
Quesnel Millionaires	60	22	32	6	0	50
Trail Smoke Eaters	60	20	32	7	1	48
Merritt Centennials	60	22	36	2	0	46
Prince George Spruce Kings	60	18	37	4	1	41
Williams Lake Timberwolves	60	10	49	0	1	21

Map of BCHL, 2009–10
Coastal Division
Interior Division

== Post-season ==
=== 2010 BCHL Fred Page Cup playoffs ===
First round
Quesnel	4
Salmon Arm	2
Penticton	4
Merritt	0
Westside	4
Trail	1
Powell River	4
Cowichan Valley	1
Langley	4
Surrey	2
Nanaimo	4
Victoria	2

Quarter-finals
Quesnel	2
Vernon	4
Penticton	4
Westside	2
Powell River	4
Langley	0
Alberni Valley	4
Nanaimo	2

Semi-finals
Vernon	4
Penticton	2
Powell River	4
Alberni Valley	3

Fred Page Cup Final
Vernon	4
Powell River	3

== Scoring leaders ==
GP = Games Played, G = Goals, A = Assists, P = Points

Player	Team	GP	G	A	P
Beau Bennett	Penticton Vees	56	41	79	120
Mark Zengerle	Salmon Arm Silverbacks	60	33	87	120
Denver Manderson	Penticton Vees	50	40	73	113
Mitch MacMillan	Alberni Valley Bulldogs	59	61	32	93
Sam Muchalla	Prince George Spruce Kings	58	29	87	87
Colton Beck	Langley Chiefs	60	39	47	86
Trevor Bailey	Westside Warriors	56	41	44	85
Connor Jones	Vernon Vipers	51	36	45	81
Mark MacMillan	Alberni Valley Bulldogs	59	26	54	80
Mike Collins	Vernon Vipers	59	30	46	76

== Leading goaltenders ==
Note: GP = Games Played, Mins = Minutes Played, W = Wins, L = Losses, T = Ties, Mins = Minutes Played, GA = Goals Against, SO = Shutouts, GAA = Goals Against Average, SV% = Save Percentage

Player	Team	GP	W	L	T	MINS	GA	SO	GAA	SV%
Blake Voth	Vernon Vipers	24	21	3	0	1445	44	3	1.83	0.928
Joel Rumpel	Penticton Vees	24	19	3	0	1308	43	2	1.97	0.920
Graeme Gordon	Vernon Vipers	37	30	6	0	2184	74	1	2.03	0.913
Frank Slubowski	Alberni Valley Bulldogs	44	32	10	1	2604	97	4	2.23	0.919
Josh Watson	Powell River Kings	35	21	12	1	2085	80	2	2.30	0.918

== Award winners ==
- Brett Hull Trophy (Top Scorer):
  - Beau Bennett (Penticton Vees)
  - Mark Zengerle (Salmon Arm Silverbacks)
- Top Defencemen:
  - Coastal division: Mat Bodie (Powell River Kings) and Jordan Heywood (Victoria Grizzlies)
  - Interior division: Brendan Ellis (Westside Warriors)
- Bruce Allison Memorial Trophy (Rookie of the Year):
  - Coastal division: Mark MacMillan (Alberni Valley Bulldogs)
  - Interior division: Beau Bennett (Penticton Vees)
- Bob Fenton Trophy (Most Sportsmanlike):
  - Coastal division: Darcy Oakes (Powell River Kings)
  - Interior division: Conor Morrison (Salmon Arm Silverbacks)
- Best Goaltender:
  - Blake Voth (Vernon Vipers)
- Wally Forslund Memorial Trophy (Best Goaltending Duo):
  - Graeme Gordon and Blake Voth (Vernon Vipers)
- Vern Dye Memorial Trophy (regular-season MVP):
  - Coastal division: Mitch MacMillan (Alberni Valley Bulldogs)
  - Interior division: Denver Manderson (Penticton Vees)
- Joe Tennant Memorial Trophy (Coach of the Year):
  - Coastal division: Nolan Graham (Alberni Valley Bulldogs)
  - Interior division: Mark Ferner (Vernon Vipers)
- Ron Boileau Memorial Trophy (Best Regular Season Record):
  - Vernon Vipers
- Cliff McNabb Memorial Trophy (Coastal Division Champions):
  - Powell River Kings
- Ryan Hatfield Trophy (Interior Division Champions):
  - Vernon Vipers
- Fred Page Cup (League Champions):
  - Vernon Vipers
- Jim Hughson Award (Broadcaster of the Year):
  - Todd Miller (Vernon Vipers)

== Players selected in 2010 NHL entry draft ==
- Beau Bennett (Penticton Vees)
- Mark MacMillan (Alberni Valley Bulldogs)
- Isaac Macleod (Penticton Vees)
- Kellen Jones (Vernon Vipers)

== See also ==
- 2009 in ice hockey
- 2010 Royal Bank Cup
- 2010 in ice hockey
- 2010 NHL entry draft
- Doyle Cup
