= Mark Zengerle =

American professional ice hockey center (born 1989)

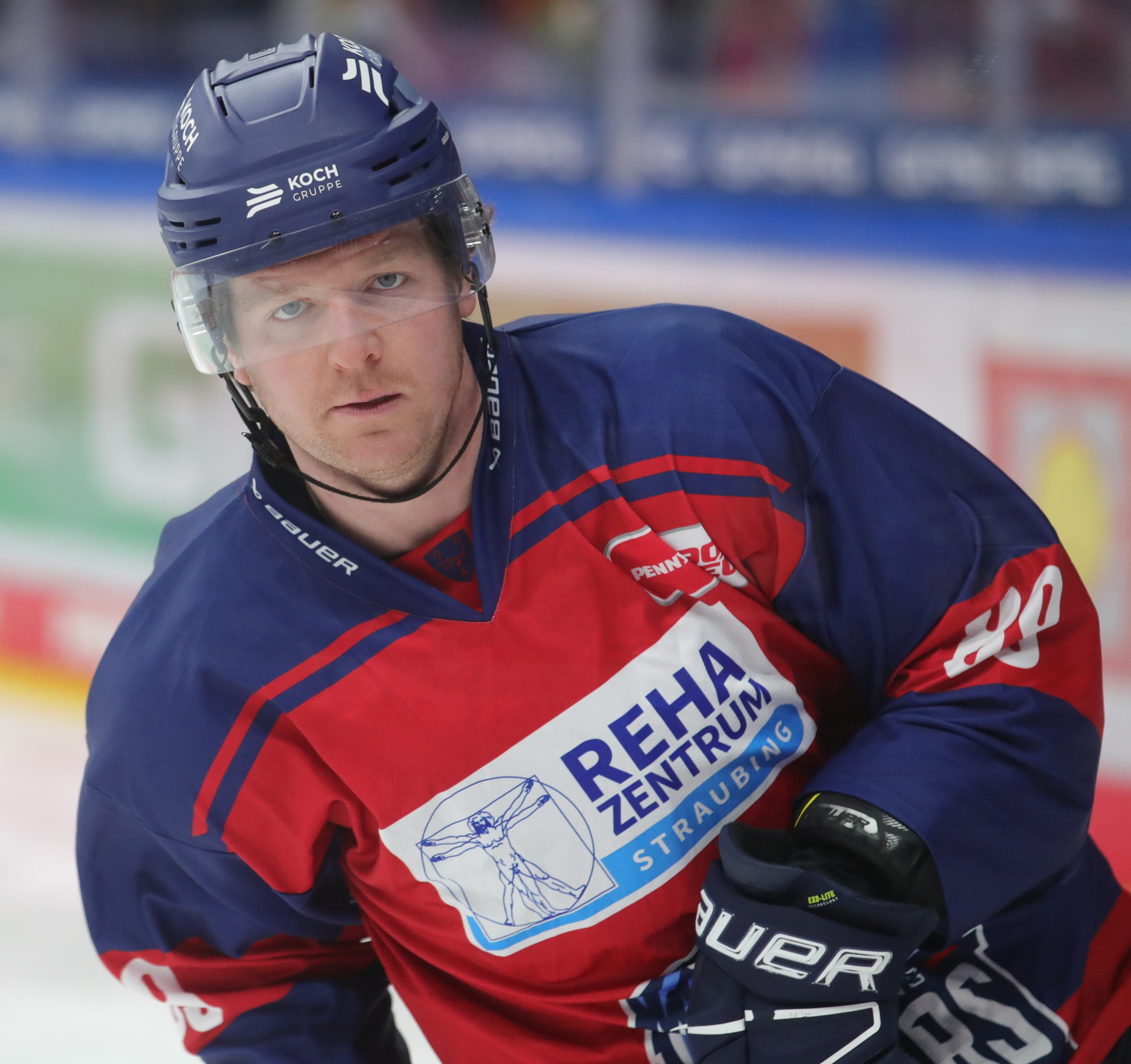
- Zengerle with the Straubing Tigers in 2023
- Born: May 12, 1989 (age 36) Rochester, New York, United States
- Height: 5 ft 11 in (180 cm)
- Weight: 181 lb (82 kg; 12 st 13 lb)
- Position: Center
- Shoots: Right
- DEL team Former teams: Free agent Grand Rapids Griffins; Lehigh Valley Phantoms; Linköpings HC; Milwaukee Admirals; Fischtown Pinguins; Eisbären Berlin; Straubing Tigers; Augsburger Panther
- NHL draft: Undrafted
- Playing career: 2014–present

Mark Zengerle (born May 12, 1989) is an American professional ice hockey center who is currently an unrestricted free agent. He most recently played for Augsburger Panther of the Deutsche Eishockey Liga (DEL).

== Playing career ==
=== Junior ===
Zengerle played for the Salmon Arm Silverbacks of the BCHL from 2008 to 2010. During the 2008–09 season, Zengerle recorded 31 goals and 62 assists in 54 games. His 93 points ranked second in the league. Following his outstanding season, he was named the BCHL's Interior Conference MVP. During the 2009–10 season, Zengerle averaged 2.0 points-per-game, and recorded 33 goals and 87 assists in 60 games. His 120 points won him the Brett Hull Trophy as the league's leading scorer. His 87 assists led the league for the second-consecutive season.

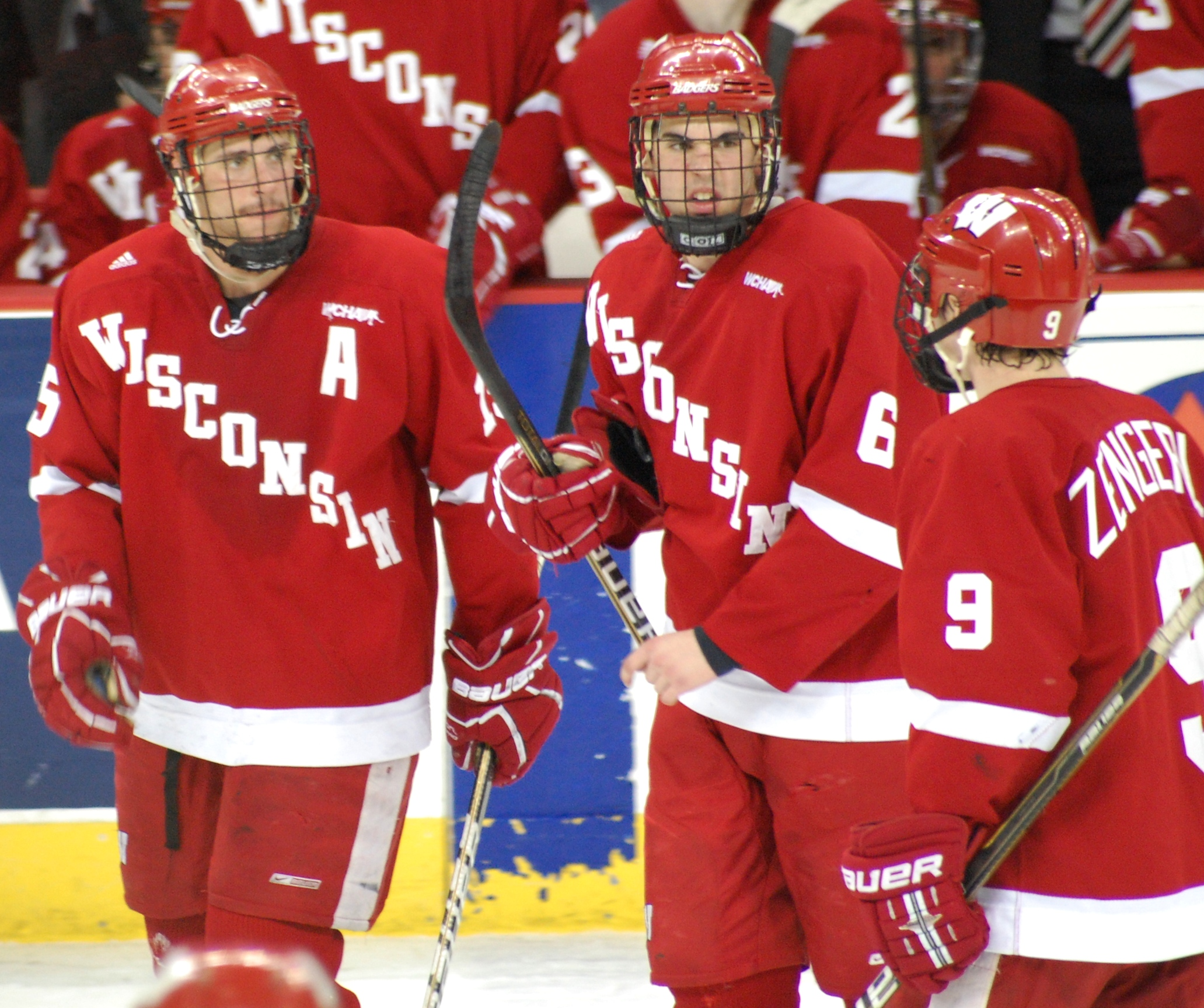
Zengerle, Justin Schultz and Craig Smith during their tenure with the Badgers in 2011.

=== College ===
Undrafted, Zengerle played college ice hockey for the Wisconsin Badgers in the NCAA Men's Division I Big Ten Conference. During his freshman season, Zengerle recorded five goals and 31 assists in 41 games. He ranked third in the WCHA in scoring among freshmen, and led all freshmen in assists. Zengerle was named the WCHA Rookie of the Week for the week ending November 9.

During his sophomore season, Zengerle led the team in scoring, recording 13 goals and 37 assists. He was tied for first in the nation with 37 assists, tied for fourth in the nation with 50 points, and tied for sixth in the nation with a 1.35 points-per-game scoring average. He was one of only three players in the nation averaging at least one assist per game. He had the second-longest scoring streak in program history, recording at least one point in 20-consecutive games from October 8 to January 13. He became just the fourth player in program history with at least 30 assists in his first two seasons, following Chris Chelios, Mark Johnson and Theran Welsh. Zengerle was named the WCHA Offensive Player of the Week for the week ending March 6. Following an outstanding season, Zengerle was named to the All-WCHA Third Team.

During his junior season, Zengerle recorded nine goals and 23 assists in 36 games. He recorded his 100th career point on February 1, 2013, becoming the 71st Badger in school history to do so. He ranked third on the team in scoring, with 32 points, and led the team in assists.

During his senior season, Zengerle led the team in scoring, recording ten goals and 34 assists in 37 games. He led the nation with 0.83 assists per game, ranked first in the Big Ten Conference with 33 assists, and ranked second in the Big Ten Conference with 44 points. He was named the Big Ten First Star of the Week for the week ending March 6. Following an outstanding season, Zengerle was named to the 2013–14 All-Big Ten First Team. Zengerle was named the Most Outstanding Player of the 2014 Big Ten Tournament following his overtime game-winning goal.

=== Professional ===
On July 22, 2014, Zengerle signaled the end of his successful collegiate career by signing to a one-year contract with the Grand Rapids Griffins of the American Hockey League (AHL). On May 20, 2015, the Griffins re-signed Zengerle to a one-year contract for the 2015–16 season.

On July 5, 2016, Zengerle signed with the Lehigh Valley Phantoms.

On May 18, 2017, Zengerle signed a one-year contract abroad with Linköpings HC of the Swedish Hockey League. In the 2017–18 season, Zengerle struggled to make the quick transition to European ice and after 9 games, registering just 1 assist, he had his contract mutually terminated on November 7, 2017. He returned to North America and the AHL, in agreeing to a one-year deal with the Milwaukee Admirals on November 8, 2017.

On October 2, 2018, having again left North America as a free agent he opted to sign a contract with German DEL team, Fischtown Pinguins in Bremerhaven. After two seasons with the Pinguins, Zengerle left at the completion of his contract, opting to remain in the DEL by agreeing to a two-year contract with Eisbären Berlin on March 24, 2020.

As a free agent, Zengerle secured a one-year contract with the Straubing Tigers of the DEL on May 19, 2022.

== Career statistics ==
=== Regular season and playoffs ===
			Regular season					Playoffs
Season	Team	League	GP	G	A	Pts	PIM	GP	G	A	Pts	PIM
2007–08	Syracuse Stars	EJHL	45	8	14	22	18	—	—	—	—	—
2008–09	Salmon Arm Silverbacks	BCHL	54	31	62	93	24	8	0	4	4	4
2009–10	Salmon Arm Silverbacks	BCHL	60	33	87	120	48	6	2	4	6	2
2010–11	University of Wisconsin	WCHA	41	5	31	36	51	—	—	—	—	—
2011–12	University of Wisconsin	WCHA	37	13	37	50	38	—	—	—	—	—
2012–13	University of Wisconsin	WCHA	36	9	23	32	8	—	—	—	—	—
2013–14	University of Wisconsin	B1G	37	10	34	44	29	—	—	—	—	—
2014–15	Grand Rapids Griffins	AHL	72	15	22	37	8	16	2	9	11	2
2015–16	Grand Rapids Griffins	AHL	72	9	38	47	34	8	0	4	4	2
2016–17	Lehigh Valley Phantoms	AHL	69	13	21	34	16	5	1	1	2	2
2017–18	Linköpings HC	SHL	9	0	1	1	2	—	—	—	—	—
2017–18	Milwaukee Admirals	AHL	57	5	27	32	18	—	—	—	—	—
2018–19	Fischtown Pinguins	DEL	46	14	38	52	24	3	0	2	2	4
2019–20	Fischtown Pinguins	DEL	41	7	32	39	28	—	—	—	—	—
2020–21	Eisbären Berlin	DEL	18	2	11	13	10	9	0	5	5	4
2021–22	Eisbären Berlin	DEL	37	6	12	18	12	4	0	0	0	0
2022–23	Straubing Tigers	DEL	46	7	26	33	22	7	0	3	3	0
2023–24	Straubing Tigers	DEL	52	15	16	31	13	12	2	5	7	4
2024–25	Augsburger Panther	DEL	52	5	15	20	18	—	—	—	—	—
AHL totals			270	42	108	150	76	29	3	14	17	6

== Awards and achievements ==
Award	Year
BCHL
(Interior) MVP	2009
College
All-WCHA Third Team	2012
WCHA All-Academic Team	2012, 2013
All-Big Ten First Team	2014
DEL
Champion (Eisbären Berlin)	2021, 2022

Awards and achievements
Preceded by Award Created	Big Ten Tournament MOP; 2014	Succeeded by Adam Wilcox
