= 2009 Royal Bank Cup =

Ice hockey tournament

Tournament details
- Venue: Bear Mountain Arena in Victoria, British Columbia
- Dates: May 2, 2009 – May 10, 2009
- Teams: 5

Final positions
- Champions: Vernon Vipers (5th title)
- Runners-up: Humboldt Broncos

Tournament statistics
- Games played: 13
- Scoring leader: Mike Collins (10 pts.) (Vernon)

Awards
- MVP: Kyle Bigos (Vernon)

The 2009 Royal Bank Cup is the 39th Junior "A" 2009 ice hockey National Championship for the Canadian Junior Hockey League. 2009 marked the 14th year the Royal Bank Cup has been awarded and the 39th year of modern Junior "A" hockey.

The Royal Bank Cup was competed for by the winners of the Doyle Cup, Anavet Cup, Dudley Hewitt Cup, the Fred Page Cup and the host city, the Victoria Grizzlies of the British Columbia Hockey League.

The tournament was hosted by the Victoria Grizzlies and run from May 2 to May 10 of 2009 with games played at the Bear Mountain Arena in Victoria, British Columbia.

The Vernon Vipers won the 2009 Royal Bank Cup with a 2–0 win over the Humboldt Broncos.

== Teams ==
- Victoria Grizzlies (Host) - The Grizzlies are the hosts of the 2009 Royal Bank Cup. The Grizzlies finished the British Columbia Hockey League regular season with both the best record in the Coastal Conference and the overall league. Victoria ran into a tough Powell River Kings team in the Conference Final, where the Grizzlies fell in Game 7.

Regular Season: 43 wins, 13 losses, 1 ties, 3 overtime losses
Playoffs: Defeated Cowichan Valley Capitals 4-3, Lost to Powell River Kings 3-4

- Humboldt Broncos (Western) - The Broncos are the defending 2008 Royal Bank Cup champions. After easily brushing through the Saskatchewan Junior Hockey League playoffs, the Broncos found themselves down 3-games-to-1 in the Anavet Cup to the Manitoba Junior Hockey League's Portage Terriers. The Broncos came to life in Game 5 to win 12–2, they won Game 6 in Overtime, and in Game 7 they rallied from a three-goal deficit in the third period to force overtime to win the Anavet Cup in the extra frame.

Regular Season: 45 wins, 8 losses, 1 overtime loss, 2 shootout losses
Playoffs: Defeated Battlefords North Stars 4-2, Defeated Flin Flon Bombers 4-0, Defeated Melville Millionaires 4-1, Defeated Portage Terriers (MJHL) 4-3

- Kingston Voyageurs (Central) - The Voyageurs, the top team in the Ontario Junior Hockey League's Rudduck Division, battled through five rounds of league playoffs to win the Ruddock Division crown, the Conference championship, and the Buckland Cup as OJHL champions. At the Dudley Hewitt Cup in Schreiber, Ontario, the Voyageurs defeated the Superior International Junior Hockey League's Fort William North Stars 4–1 in the tournament final.

Regular Season: 36 wins, 9 losses, 1 overtime loss, 3 shootout losses
Playoffs: Defeated Pickering Panthers 3-1, Defeated Ajax Attack 4-0, Defeated Peterborough Stars 4-2, Defeated Huntsville Otters 4-1, Defeated Oakville Blades 4-2, Won Dudley Hewitt Cup (3-1)

- Summerside Western Capitals (Eastern) - The Capitals finished the 2008-09 regular season with the best record in the Maritime Junior A Hockey League. Summerside had little problem battling through the three rounds of Maritime League playoffs to move on to the Fred Page Cup in Moncton, New Brunswick. The Capitals defeated the Dieppe Commandos in the tournament final 3–2 in double overtime, pelting their goaltender with 71 shots on net before finally taking their place in the 2009 Royal Bank Cup.

Regular Season: 39 wins, 13 losses, 2 shootout losses
Playoffs: Defeated Dieppe Commandos 4-0, Defeated Miramichi Timberwolves 4-0, Defeated Truro Bearcats 4-1, Won Fred Page Cup (4-1)

- Vernon Vipers (Pacific) - The Vipers were the top team in the British Columbia Hockey League's Interior Conference and second best overall behind Victoria. The Vipers convincingly walked through the BCHL playoffs, defeating all three of their opponents to win the League championship. In the Doyle Cup, the Viper made quick work of the Alberta Junior Hockey League's Grande Prairie Storm with a 4-games-sweep to clinch their spot in the 2009 Royal Bank Cup.

Regular Season: 42 wins, 14 losses, 1 tie, 3 overtime losses
Playoffs: Defeated Penticton Vees 4-1, Defeated Salmon Arm Silverbacks 4-2, Defeated Powell River Kings 4-2, Defeated Grande Prairie Storm (AJHL) 4-0

== Tournament ==
=== Round Robin ===
Pos	League (Ticket)	Team	Pld	W	L	GF	GA	GD	Qualification
1	BCHL (Doyle Cup)	Vernon Vipers	4	4	0	24	12	+12	Semi-final
2	SJHL (Anavet Cup)	Humboldt Broncos	4	2	2	8	15	−7	Semi-final
3	BCHL (Host)	Victoria Grizzlies	4	2	2	16	10	+6	Semi-final
4	OJHL (Dudley Hewitt Cup)	Kingston Voyageurs	4	1	3	14	23	−9	Semi-final
5	MJAHL (Fred Page Cup)	Summerside Western Capitals	4	1	3	15	17	−2	

==== Results ====
Game	Home team	Score	Away team	Score	Notes
Saturday, May 2, 2009
1	Victoria Grizzlies	1	Humboldt Broncos	2	Final - Shots: 35-34 Hum
Sunday, May 3, 2009
2	Summerside Western Capitals	2	Vernon Vipers	4	Final - Shots: 38-21 Ver
3	Kingston Voyageurs	0	Victoria Grizzlies	5	Final - Shots: 40-21 Vic
Monday, May 4, 2009
4	Summerside Western Capitals	5	Kingston Voyageurs	7	Final - Shots: 50-28 SWC
5	Vernon Vipers	7	Humboldt Broncos	1	Final - Shots: 30-20 Ver
Tuesday, May 5, 2009
6	Vernon Vipers	5	Victoria Grizzlies	4	OT Final - Shots: 32-32 Even
Wednesday, May 6, 2009
7	Humboldt Broncos	5	Kingston Voyageurs	2	Final - Shots: 34-23 Hum
8	Victoria Grizzlies	6	Summerside Western Capitals	3	Final - Shots: 41-32 Vic
Thursday, May 7, 2009
9	Kingston Voyageurs	5	Vernon Vipers	8	Final - Shots: 33-21 Ver
10	Humboldt Broncos	0	Summerside Western Capitals	5	Final - Shots: 35-18 SWC

=== Semi-final ===
Game	Home team	Score	Away team	Score	Notes
Friday, May 8, 2009
11	Vernon Vipers	6	Kingston Voyageurs	3	Final - Shots: 34-16 Ver
12	Humboldt Broncos	3	Victoria Grizzlies	2	OT Final - Shots: 40-30 Vic

=== Final ===
Game	Home team	Score	Away team	Score	Notes
Sunday, May 10, 2009
13	Vernon Vipers	2	Humboldt Broncos	0	Final - Shots: 27-24 Hum

== Awards ==
Roland Mercier Trophy (Tournament MVP): Kyle Bigos (Vernon Vipers)
Top Forward: Connor Jones (Vernon Vipers)
Top Defencemen: Kyle Bigos (Vernon Vipers)
Top Goaltender: Anthony Grieco (Victoria Grizzlies)
Tubby Smaltz Trophy (Sportsmanship): Ryan Santana (Vernon Vipers)

== Roll of League Champions ==
AJHL: Grande Prairie Storm
BCHL: Vernon Vipers
CJHL: Pembroke Lumber Kings
MJHL: Portage Terriers
MJAHL: Summerside Western Capitals
NOJHL: Soo Thunderbirds
OPJHL: Kingston Voyageurs
QJAAAHL: Sherbrooke Cougars
SJHL: Humboldt Broncos
SIJHL: Fort William North Stars

== See also ==
- Canadian Junior A Hockey League
- Royal Bank Cup
- Anavet Cup
- Doyle Cup
- Dudley Hewitt Cup
- Fred Page Cup
