= Penticton Vees (BCHL) =

Ice hockey team

- City: Penticton, British Columbia
- League: British Columbia Hockey League
- Division: Interior
- Founded: 1961
- Home arena: South Okanagan Events Centre
- Colours: Black, blue, and white

Franchise history
- 1961–1963: Penticton Junior Vees
- 1964–1975: Penticton Broncos
- 1975–1979: Penticton Vees
- 1979–1990: Penticton Knights
- 1990–2004: Penticton Panthers
- 2004–2025: Penticton Vees

The Penticton Vees were a junior ice hockey franchise in the British Columbia Hockey League (BCHL) based in Penticton, British Columbia, Canada. As a charter member of the league, the Penticton franchise had been named, at different times, the Junior Vees (1961–1963), the Broncos (1964–1975), the Vees (1975–1979), the Knights (1979–1990), the Panthers (1990–2004) and the Vees (2004–2025). After the establishment of a Western Hockey League franchise called the Penticton Vees in 2025, the BCHL franchise was placed on hiatus while seeking to relocate.

== History ==
The Junior Vees were one of the inaugural teams in the Okanagan-Mainline Junior Hockey League (OMJHL), launched in 1961. The league became the British Columbia Junior Hockey League (BCJHL) in 1967.

The Penticton Vees were named for the Veteran, Valiant, and Vidette varieties of peaches grown in the Okanagan Valley.

The Vees were Mowat Cup champions in 1968, 1973, 1980, 1981, 1982, 1985, as well as in 1986, when they were also Centennial Cup champions. After 26 years since their last RBC Cup appearance, the Vees advanced to the championship game in the 2012 RBC Cup in Humboldt, Saskatchewan, defeating the Woodstock Slammers 4–3 on a goal by Joey Benik to win the Canadian National Junior A Championship.

In March 2025, the City of Penticton was awarded an expansion franchise in the Western Hockey League, which also was called the Penticton Vees, and the BCHL franchise was placed on indefinite hiatus pending its relocation to another market.

== Season-by-season record ==
Note: GP = Games played, W = Wins, L = Losses, T = Ties, OTL = Overtime Losses, Pts = Points, GF = Goals for, GA = Goals against, PIM = Penalties in minutes

| Season | GP | W | L | T | OTL | GF | GA | Pts | Finish | Playoffs |
|---|---|---|---|---|---|---|---|---|---|---|
| 1961–62 | 27 | 9 | 18 | 0 | — | 93 | 149 | 18 | 3rd, OMJHL | Lost in semifinals, 1–3 (Rockets) |
| 1962–63 | 31 | 1 | 30 | 0 | — | 61 | 300 | 2 | 4th, OMJHL | Lost in semifinals, 0–2 (default) (Rockets) |
| 1963–64 | Did not participate | | | | | | | | | |
| 1964–65 | 30 | 11 | 15 | 4 | — | 104 | 159 | 26 | 3rd, OJHL | Lost in semifinals, 1–4 (Kraft Kings) |
| 1965–66 | 30 | 15 | 14 | 1 | — | 145 | 113 | 31 | 3rd, OJHL | Lost in semifinals, 1–4 (Buckaroos) |
| 1966–67 | 40 | 33 | 7 | 0 | — | | | 66 | 1st, OJHL | Fred Page Cup champions, 4–1 (Buckaroos) |
| 1967–68 | 40 | 30 | 8 | 2 | — | 218 | 123 | 62 | 1st | Won finals Won Mowat Cup; Won Doyle Cup; Lost Abbott Cup |
| 1968–69 | 40 | 23 | 14 | 3 | — | 209 | 157 | 49 | 2nd | Lost in finals |
| 1969–70 | 48 | 19 | 23 | 6 | — | 188 | 202 | 44 | 5th | Did not qualify |
| 1970–71 | 60 | 36 | 19 | 5 | — | 275 | 203 | 77 | 2nd | Did not compete in league playoffs Lost Doyle Cup |
| 1971–72 | 60 | 33 | 20 | 7 | — | | | 73 | 2nd | Lost in finals |
| 1972–73 | 62 | 41 | 18 | 3 | — | 314 | 232 | 85 | 2nd | Won finals Won Mowat Cup; Won Doyle Cup; Lost Abbott Cup |
| 1973–74 | 64 | 38 | 24 | 2 | — | 310 | 280 | 78 | 3rd | Lost in semifinals |
| 1974–75 | 66 | 35 | 29 | 2 | — | 379 | 334 | 72 | 2nd | Lost in quarterfinals |
| 1975–76 | 66 | 27 | 36 | 3 | — | 302 | 337 | 57 | 6th | Lost in finals |
| 1976–77 | 68 | 43 | 22 | 3 | — | 404 | 307 | 89 | 3rd | Lost in finals |
| 1977–78 | 66 | 47 | 17 | 2 | — | 492 | 303 | 96 | 2nd | Forfeited finals |
| 1978–79 | 62 | 23 | 37 | 2 | — | 263 | 310 | 48 | 10th | Did not qualify |
| 1979–80 | 60 | 41 | 18 | 1 | — | 350 | 240 | 83 | 2nd | Won finals Won Mowat Cup; Lost Doyle Cup |
| 1980–81 | 56 | 35 | 20 | 1 | — | 267 | 227 | 71 | 2nd | Won finals Won Mowat Cup; Lost Doyle Cup |
| 1981–82 | 48 | 43 | 5 | 0 | — | 364 | 130 | 86 | 1st | Won finals Won Mowat Cup; Lost Doyle Cup |
| 1982–83 | 56 | 34 | 22 | 0 | — | 355 | 249 | 68 | 5th | Lost in semifinals |
| 1983–84 | 60 | 47 | 13 | 0 | — | 448 | 197 | 94 | 1st | Lost in finals |
| 1984–85 | 52 | 47 | 5 | 0 | — | 498 | 193 | 94 | 1st | Won finals Won Mowat Cup; Won Doyle Cup; Won Abbott Cup; Lost Centennial Cup |
| 1985–86 | 52 | 44 | 8 | 0 | — | 433 | 195 | 88 | 1st | Won finals Won Mowat Cup; Won Doyle Cup; Won Abbott Cup; Won Centennial Cup |
| 1986–87 | 52 | 30 | 19 | 3 | — | 284 | 205 | 63 | 5th | Lost in quarterfinals |
| 1987–88 | 52 | 26 | 26 | 0 | — | 268 | 252 | 52 | 6th | Lost in semifinals |
| 1988–89 | 60 | 16 | 42 | 2 | — | 260 | 351 | 34 | 10th | Did not qualify |
| 1989–90 | 27 | 6 | 21 | 0 | — | 107 | 174 | 12 | 10th | Folded in season |
| 1990–91 | 60 | 13 | 44 | 3 | — | 245 | 358 | 29 | 10th | Did not qualify |
| 1991–92 | 60 | 38 | 20 | 2 | — | 321 | 277 | 78 | 3rd | Lost in quarterfinals |
| 1992–93 | 60 | 35 | 23 | 2 | — | 350 | 282 | 72 | 2nd | Lost in semifinals |
| 1993–94 | 60 | 40 | 17 | 3 | — | 341 | 261 | 83 | 3rd | Lost in quarterfinals |
| 1994–95 | 60 | 42 | 16 | 2 | — | 321 | 250 | 86 | 1st in Interior | Lost in semifinals |
| 1995–96 | 60 | 32 | 26 | 2 | — | 269 | 248 | 66 | 2nd in Interior | Lost in quarterfinals |
| 1996–97 | 60 | 31 | 27 | 2 | — | 285 | 236 | 64 | 3rd in Interior | Lost in quarterfinals |
| 1997–98 | 60 | 45 | 12 | 3 | — | 296 | 177 | 93 | 1st in Interior | Lost in finals |
| 1998–99 | 60 | 33 | 22 | — | 5 | 230 | 197 | 71 | 3rd in Interior | Lost in quarterfinals |
| 1999–00 | 60 | 42 | 14 | — | 4 | 283 | 167 | 88 | 1st in Interior | Lost in quarterfinals |
| 2000–01 | 60 | 48 | 10 | — | 2 | 280 | 166 | 98 | 1st in Interior | Lost in semifinals |
| 2001–02 | 60 | 32 | 21 | — | 7 | 222 | 209 | 71 | 2nd in Interior | Lost in semifinals |
| 2002–03 | 60 | 20 | 32 | 2 | 6 | 222 | 268 | 48 | 6th in Interior | Lost in preliminary round |
| 2003–04 | 60 | 22 | 28 | 1 | 9 | 178 | 237 | 54 | 7th of 8, Interior; 15th of 17, BCHL | Did not qualify |
| 2004–05 | 60 | 25 | 26 | 2 | 7 | 180 | 193 | 59 | 6th of 8, Interior; 11 of 17, BCHL | Lost in quarterfinals |
| 2005–06 | 60 | 41 | 13 | 2 | 4 | 245 | 137 | 88 | 2nd of 8, Interior; 4th of 17, BCHL | Lost in finals |
| 2006–07 | 60 | 41 | 14 | 2 | 3 | 231 | 163 | 87 | 1st of 9, Interior; 1st of 17, BCHL | Lost in semifinals |
| 2007–08 | 60 | 41 | 15 | 2 | 2 | 235 | 146 | 86 | 1st of 8, Interior; 1st of 16, BCHL | Won first round, 4-3 (Vipers); Won semifinals, 4-0 (Warriors); Won finals, 4-0 (Clippers) |
| 2008–09 | 60 | 36 | 17 | 0 | 7 | 220 | 159 | 79 | 4th of 8, Interior; 4th of 16, BCHL | Lost semifinals |
| 2009–10 | 60 | 48 | 8 | 0 | 4 | 284 | 143 | 100 | 2nd of 9, Interior; 2nd of 17, BCHL | Lost semifinals |
| 2010–11 | 60 | 38 | 17 | 3 | 2 | 217 | 171 | 81 | 2nd of 8, Interior; 3rd of 16, BCHL | Won first round, 4-0 (Millionaires); Lost second round, 4-1 (Silverbacks) |
| 2011–12 | 60 | 54 | 4 | 0 | 2 | 334 | 133 | 110 | 1st of 8, Interior; 1st of 16, BCHL | Won first round, 4-2 (Chiefs); Won semifinals, 4-1 (Centennials); Won finals, 4-0 (Kings); Won Doyle Cup, 4-1 (Bandits); Won Royal Bank Cup, 4-3 (Slammers) |
| 2012–13 | 56 | 35 | 16 | 0 | 5 | 197 | 137 | 75 | 1st of 6, Interior; 2nd of 16, BCHL | Won first round, 4-0 (Silverbacks); Won semifinals, 4-1 (Warriors); Lost finals, 4-2 (Eagles) |
| 2013–14 | 58 | 36 | 16 | 2 | 4 | 199 | 137 | 78 | 1st of 6, Interior; 3rd of 16, BCHL | Won first round, 4-0 (Centennials); Lost second round, 4-3 (Vipers) |
| 2014–15 | 58 | 44 | 9 | 3 | 2 | 216 | 115 | 93 | 1st of 6, Interior; 1st of 16, BCHL | Won first round, (Warriors); Won second round, 4-3 (Vipers); Won final, 4-2 (Clippers); Won Western Canada Cup, 4-1 (Terriers); Lost Royal Bank Cup, 1-0 (Canadians) |
| 2015–16 | 58 | 50 | 7 | 1 | 0 | 263 | 121 | 101 | 1st of 6, Interior; 1st of 17, BCHL | Won first round, 4-0 (Vipers); Lost division finals, 4-2 (Warriors) |
| 2016–17 | 58 | 41 | 13 | 3 | 1 | 189 | 129 | 86 | 1st of 6, Interior; 3rd of 17, BCHL | Won division semifinals 3–4 (Centennials); Won division finals 4–3 (Vipers); Won league finals, 4–3 (Chiefs) |
| 2017–18 | 58 | 40 | 12 | 3 | 3 | 216 | 130 | 86 | 1st of 7, Interior; 1st of 17, BCHL | Won division quarterfinals 4–0 (Express); Lost division semifinals 3–4 (Smoke Eaters) |
| 2018–19 | 58 | 37 | 16 | — | 5 | 200 | 143 | 79 | 1st of 7, Interior; 3rd of 17, BCHL | Lost first round, 2–4 (Capitals) |
| 2019–20 | 58 | 44 | 12 | 0 | 2 | 225 | 135 | 90 | 1st of 7, Interior; 2nd of 17, BCHL | Won first round, 4–1 (Warriors); Season cancelled due to the COVID-19 pandemic |
| 2020–21 | 20 | 18 | 1 | 0 | 1 | 90 | 23 | 37 | 1st of 3, Penticton Pod; 1st of 16, BCHL | Covid-19 "pod season"–no playoffs |
| 2021–22 | 54 | 43 | 8 | 1 | 2 | 256 | 123 | 89 | 1st of 9, Interior; 1st of 18, BCHL | Won division quarterfinal, 4–1 (Smoke Eaters); Won division semifinal, 4–0 (Spruce Kings); Won division finals, 4–0 (Warriors); Won league finals, 4–0 (Clippers) |
| 2022–23 | 54 | 50 | 3 | 0 | 0 | 304 | 96 | 101 | 1st of 9, Interior; 1st of 18, BCHL | Won first round, 4-0 (Smoke Eaters); Won second round, 4-0 (Wild); Won semifinals, 4-1 (Silverbacks); Won finals, 4-0 (Bulldogs) |
| 2023–24 | 54 | 38 | 10 | 0 | 3 | 202 | 116 | 82 | 1st of 8, Interior; 2nd of 17, BCHL | Won first round, 4-0 (Spruce Kings); Won second round, 4-1 (Vipers); Won semifinals, 4-3 (Silverbacks); Lost finals, 4-2 (Eagles) |
| 2024–25 | 54 | 41 | 8 | 5 | 0 | 210 | 136 | 87 | 1st of 11, Interior; 1st of 21, BCHL | Won conference quarterfinal, 4-0 (Oilers); Won conference semifinal, 4-0 (Bucks); Lost conference finals, 2-4 (Bandits) |

== Western Canada Cup ==
Western Canada Cup was the Western Canada Junior A Championship held from 2013 to 2017. The champions from the AJHL, BCHL, MJHL, SJHL, and a host team competed in round-robin tournament. After the round-robin, the first and second place team played for championship, the loser then played a runner-up g game against the winner of a third vs. fourth semifinal game. The champion and runners-up would then qualify to compete for the RBC Cup and the National Junior A Championship.

| Year | Round-robin | Record | Standing | Semifinal | Championship game | Runner-up game |
|---|---|---|---|---|---|---|
| 2015 | W, Spruce Grove Saints 11–3; W, Fort McMurray Oil Barons 6–0; W, Melfort Mustangs 3–1; L, Portage Terriers 2–3 | 3–1–0 | 1st of 5 | — | W, Portage Terriers 4–3; Champions | — |
| 2017; Host | OTW, Battlefords North Stars 2–1; OTL, Brooks Bandits 1–2; L, Chilliwack Chiefs 2–4; W, Portage Terriers 5–3 | 1–1–1–1 | 3rd of 5 | W, Battlefords North Stars 4–0 | — | W, Chilliwack Chiefs 3–2 |

== National Junior A Championship ==
The National Junior A Championship, formerly known as the Royal Bank Cup from 1996 to 2018, is the annual championship tournament for Hockey Canada's junior A hockey leagues. Depending on the year, various regional champions, qualifiers, and hosts participate in the championship tournament. The tournament usually consists of opening in a round-robin with the top four teams then advancing to a semifinal were the winners compete a championship game.

| Year | Round-robin | Record | Standing | Semifinal | Championship Game |
|---|---|---|---|---|---|
| 2012 | L, Soo Thunderbirds 1–2; OTL, Humboldt Broncos 2–3; W Woodstock Slammers 2–1; W, Portage Terriers 3–1 | 2–1–1 | 3rd of 5 | W, Soo Thunderbirds 3–0 | W, 3-2; Woodstock Slammers; National Champions |
| 2015 | L, Portage Terriers 2–3; W, Melfort Mustangs 4–0; W Carleton Place Canadians 4–3; W, Soo Thunderbirds 5–2 | 3–1–0 | 2nd of 5 | L, Carleton Place Canadians 1–2 (2OT) | — |
| 2017 | OTL, Brooks Bandits 1–2; OTW, Cobourg Cougars 3–2; W, Trenton Golden Hawks 4–0; L, Terrebonne Cobras 1–3 | 1–1–1–1 | 4th of 5 | L, Cobourg Cougars 1–3 | — |

== Notable alumni ==
Forty-three alumni of the junior Penticton team have played in the National Hockey League (NHL).

In the 2023 NHL entry draft, Bradly Nadeau was drafted in the first round by the Carolina Hurricanes (# 30 overall) as the only first-round BCHL player selected and Aydar Suniev was selected #80 by Calgary Flames. 19 2022-23 players have committed to NCAA Hockey teams, including the two NHL draftees.

Penticton Broncos (1964–1975)

- Bruce Affleck, Tony Currie, Gary Donaldson, Reg Kerr, Dave McLelland, Vic Mercredi, Grant Mulvey, Bob Nicholson

Penticton Vees (1975–1979)

- Ross Fitzpatrick, Darren Jensen, Kevin Maxwell, Andy Moog, Howard Walker

Penticton Knights (1979–1990)

- Rick Boh, Jim Camazzola, Ed Cristofoli, Neil Eisenhut, Ray Ferraro, Norm Foster, Brett Hull, Ian Kidd, Scott Levins, Derek Mayer, Joe Murphy, Scott Sharples

Penticton Panthers (1990–2004)

- Mike Brown, Kyle Cumiskey, Paul Kariya, Duncan Keith, Chuck Kobasew, Rick Lanz, Brendan Morrison, Jason Podollan, Kevin Sawyer, Robbie Tallas, Tanner Glass, Matt Zaba

Penticton Vees (2004–present)

- Zac Dalpe, Ryan Johansen, Beau Bennett, Curtis McKenzie, Mike Reilly, Troy Stecher, Tyson Jost, Dante Fabbro, Hunter Miska, Bradly Nadeau, Owen Sillinger, Mat Robson

== See also ==
- List of ice hockey teams in British Columbia
- Penticton Vees (senior)

| Preceded by Orillia Travelways | Centennial Cup Champions; 1986 | Succeeded by Richmond Sockeyes |
| Preceded by Pembroke Lumber Kings | Royal Bank Cup Champions; 2012 | Succeeded by Brooks Bandits |
