= 2020–21 BCHL season =

- League: BCHL
- Sport: Ice hockey
- Duration: 2 April 2021 – 11 May 2021
- Games: 20
- Teams: 16

BCHL seasons
- ← 2019–20 2021–22 →

The 2020–21 BCHL season is the 59th season of the British Columbia Hockey League (BCHL). Originally, eighteen teams from the Interior and Coastal Conferences were to play 54-game schedules, but due to delays caused by COVID-19 pandemic, sixteen teams played 20-game schedules in five "pods" of three or four teams each. In normal seasons, the top teams from each conference would play for the Fred Page Cup, the BCHL Championship, in March, but no playoffs were held in 2021.

In previous seasons, the BCHL playoff champion represented the league in the Doyle Cup, a best-of-seven series against the Alberta Junior Hockey League champion, to determine who represents the Pacific region in the Canadian Junior Hockey League's (CJHL) National Junior A Championship, the Centennial Cup, that would have been held in Penticton in 2021. However, the 2021 Doyle and Centennial Cups were cancelled by Hockey Canada. In March 2021, the BCHL withdrew its membership with the CJHL and is no longer eligible to compete for the Doyle Cup or Centennial Cup.

== Offseason ==
=== Pandemic impact ===
Due to restrictions during the COVID-19 pandemic, the league announced a tentative start date of December 1, with an extended training camp and exhibition season starting on September 25. This was to serve as a test for how the BCHL envisioned the regular season would work out, with the 17 teams able to participate while divided in to four groups playing in their home arenas. The league had made a number of changes to ensure the health and safety of its players, such as requiring full-face shields. Players were also required to separate as soon as play stops with ten minute misconducts being given out for failing to do so.

However, as British Columbia started to experience a second wave of infections, provincial health officer Dr. Bonnie Henry introduced new restrictions on November 7 barring non-essential inter-regional travel for sporting competitions in the Lower Mainland. This effected the Chilliwack Chiefs, Coquitlam Express, Langley Rivermen, Powell River Kings and Surrey Eagles, and all remaining exhibition games were cancelled between them. Two weeks later, these restrictions were expanded to the rest of the province on November 23, as well as the suspension of all adult sporting activities. Because the league has 19 and 20-year-olds on its roster, the remainder of the exhibition season was cancelled and plans for the regular season were put on hold. In the meantime, the Wenatchee Wild announced that they had withdrawn from the regular season due to the Canada-United States border closure, as it is a US-based team.

With restrictions having not been lifted by March, and talks between the league and the Provincial Health Authority continuing, the BCHL considered a possible cancellation of the season. On March 12, the Provincial Health Authority approved the league's return-to-play plan and it was announced that the 2020–21 season would go ahead, with teams playing 20 game schedules divided into five pods of three to four teams each starting in April, with only the Langley Rivermen opting out of the season.

Before the start of the season, the BCHL notified the Canadian Junior Hockey League (CJHL) that it was withdrawing its membership effective March 24, 2021.

=== League changes ===
- The Cranbrook Bucks joined the league as part of the Interior Conference.
- The Prince George Spruce Kings moved to the Interior Conference. The remaining nine teams in the Island and Mainland Divisions were merged into the Coastal Conference.
- The regular season schedule was reduced from 58 games to 54, but were further reduced to 20 games due to the pandemic.
- The top eight teams from each conference would qualify for the playoffs. As a result, crossover spots were eliminated. Eventually, playoffs were cancelled entirely for this season.
- Players would be suspended after their second fight of the season, (previously fifth) and discipline would increase exponentially for every fight after. Players would now receive automatic suspensions for instigator and aggressor penalties.
- A number of changes were made as a result of the COVID-19 pandemic, including requiring full-face shields for all players and attempting to reduce the amount of contact between teams during stoppages in play, including assessing ten minute misconducts for failing to separate.
- Due the United States-Canada border closure during the pandemic, the Wenatchee Wild withdrew from the season.
- The Langley Rivermen opted out of the league's plans to restart the season.

== Standings ==
Note: GP = Games Played, W = Wins, L = Losses, T/O/S = Ties/Overtime Losses/Shootout Losses, Pts = Points

Chilliwack pod
TEAM NAMES	GP	W	L	T/O/S	Pts
Prince George Spruce Kings	20	14	5	1	29
Chilliwack Chiefs	20	13	7	0	26
Merritt Centennials	20	3	17	0	6

Coquitlam pod
TEAM NAMES	GP	W	L	T/O/S	Pts
Surrey Eagles	20	17	2	1	35
Powell River Kings	20	7	11	2	16
Coquitlam Express	20	6	11	3	15

Penticton pod
TEAM NAMES	GP	W	L	T/O/S	Pts
Penticton Vees	20	18	1	1	37
Trail Smoke Eaters	20	9	11	0	18
Cranbrook Bucks	20	3	16	1	7

Port Alberni pod
TEAM NAMES	GP	W	L	T/O/S	Pts
Victoria Grizzlies	20	14	6	0	28
Alberni Valley Bulldogs	20	11	5	4	26
Nanaimo Clippers	20	8	11	1	17
Cowichan Valley Capitals	20	7	11	2	16

Vernon pod
TEAM NAMES	GP	W	L	T/O/S	Pts
Vernon Vipers	20	13	5	2	28
Salmon Arm Silverbacks	20	9	7	4	22
West Kelowna Warriors	20	8	10	2	18

== Postseason ==
Due to the pod-based season and ongoing pandemic-related restrictions in Canada, the BCHL announced there would be no postseason in 2021.

== Players selected in 2021 NHL entry draft ==
- Joaquim Lemay (Salmon Arm Silverbacks) – Round four, pick 119

== See also ==
- 2020 in ice hockey
- 2021 in ice hockey
- 2021 NHL entry draft
