= 2019–20 BCHL season =

2019–20 BCHL Season
- League: British Columbia Hockey League
- Sport: Hockey
- Duration: Regular season 6 September 2019 – 23 February 2020; Playoffs; 28 February 2020 – 13 March 2020
- Teams: 17

Fred Page Cup
- Champions: Not awarded

BCHL seasons
- ← 2018–19 2020–21 →

The 2019–20 BCHL season was the 58th season of the British Columbia Hockey League (BCHL). The seventeen teams from the Interior, Island and Mainland divisions played 58-game schedules. The 2019 BCHL Showcase Festival occurred shortly after the start of the season, on October 2–3, 2019, in Chilliwack and October 4–5, 2019, in Penticton.

In March, teams began playing for the Fred Page Cup, the BCHL championship. However, Hockey Canada cancelled the remainder of the Junior A hockey season in Canada due to the COVID-19 pandemic the day the second round was to get underway. As a result, the BCHL did not award the Fred Page Cup for the first time in its 58-year history.

== League changes ==
Team map, 2019–20 BCHL season
Island Division
Mainland Division
Interior Division

There were no changes to the league alignment or schedule from the previous season. The league did adopt a new rule allowing the attacking team to choose which side they want to take a faceoff after an icing or penalty call.

== Standings ==
Note: GP = Games Played, W = Wins, L = Losses, OTL = Overtime Losses, Pts = Points
Final standings:

Island Division
	GP	W	L	OTL/T	PTS
Nanaimo Clippers	58	37	17	4	78
Cowichan Valley Capitals	58	35	16	7	77
Powell River Kings	58	29	23	6	64
Alberni Valley Bulldogs	58	26	28	4	56
Victoria Grizzlies	58	24	33	1	49
Mainland Division
	GP	W	L	OTL/T	PTS
Coquitlam Express	58	47	9	2	96
Chilliwack Chiefs	58	26	21	11	63
Surrey Eagles	58	27	23	8	62
Langley Rivermen	58	23	31	4	50
Prince George Spruce Kings	58	18	32	8	44
Interior Division
	GP	W	L	OTL/T	PTS
Penticton Vees	58	44	12	2	90
Trail Smoke Eaters	58	36	17	5	77
Salmon Arm Silverbacks	58	30	23	5	65
Wenatchee Wild	58	30	23	5	65
Vernon Vipers	58	30	24	4	64
West Kelowna Warriors	58	16	33	9	41
Merritt Centennials	58	14	40	4	32

== Post-season ==
=== 2020 BCHL Fred Page Cup playoffs ===
Round 1
Is1	Nanaimo	4
Is4	Alberni Valley	0
Is2	Cowichan Valley	4
Is3	Powell River	1
M1	Coquitlam	4
M4	Langley	0
M2	Chilliwack	3
M3	Surrey	4
In1	Penticton	4
In6	West Kelowna	1
In4	Wenatchee	1
In5	Vernon	4
In2	Trail	4
WC2	Prince George	0
In3	Salmon Arm	4
WC1	Victoria	0

Round 2
Is1	Nanaimo	—
Is2	Cowichan Valley	—
M1	Coquitlam	—
M3	Surrey	—
In1	Penticton	—
In5	Vernon	—
In2	Trail	—
In3	Salmon Arm	—

Semifinals

Finals

==== Cancellation of 2020 playoffs ====
Due to the COVID-19 pandemic, North American sports leagues began suspending their seasons on 11 March 2020. The National Hockey League officially suspended the remainder of the season on 12 March 2020, which was followed by Hockey Canada suspending all sanctioned hockey activities in the country later that day. On 13 March 2020, the Canadian Junior Hockey League, in which the BCHL is a member, cancelled the remainder of the 2019–20 CJHL season, which meant the Fred Page Cup playoffs would not be finished, and both the Doyle Cup and Centennial Cup would not be contested. It is the only time in the history of the BCHL that the season ended without crowning a champion.

== Scoring leaders ==
GP = Games Played, G = Goals, A = Assists, P = Points, PIM = Penalties In Minutes

Player	Team	GP	G	A	Pts	PIM
Kent Johnson	Trail Smoke Eaters	52	41	60	101	14
Cristophe Tellier	Surrey Eagles	58	28	43	71	49
Michael Colella	Trail Smoke Eaters	58	27	41	68	28
Owen Ozar	Trail Smoke Eaters	54	26	40	66	81
Jay O'Brien	Penticton Vees	46	25	41	66	51
Matt Kowalski	Vernon Vipers	58	26	36	62	20
David Silye	Penticton Vees	58	20	42	62	28
Hudson Schandor	Surrey Eagles	56	25	36	61	36
Greg Lapointe	Coquitlam Express	56	29	31	60	48
Danny Weight	Penticton Vees	58	25	35	60	59

== Leading goaltenders ==
Note: GP = Games Played, Mins = Minutes Played, W = Wins, L = Losses, OTL = Overtime Losses, GA = Goals Against, SO = Shutouts, Sv% = Save Percentage, GAA = Goals Against Average.

Player	Team	GP	Mins	W	L	OTL	GA	SO	Sv%	GAA
Clay Stevenson	Coquitlam Express	35	2067	30	2	1	61	4	.936	1.77
Jordon Naylor	Nanaimo Clippers	41	2461	30	9	2	83	6	.935	2.02
Yaniv Perets	Penticton Vees	37	2165	25	8	1	79	5	.918	2.19
Logan Terness	Trail Smoke Eaters	44	2445	27	10	2	96	1	.932	2.36
Zach Borgiel	Cowichan Valley Capitals	44	2562	26	12	3	109	4	.923	2.55

== Award winners ==
- Brett Hull Trophy (Top Scorer): Kent Johnson (Trail Smoke Eaters)
- Best Defenceman: Akito Hirose (Salmon Arm Silverbacks)
- Bruce Allison Memorial Trophy (Rookie of the Year): Logan Terness (Trail Smoke Eaters)
- Bob Fenton Trophy (Most Sportsmanlike): Kent Johnson (Trail Smoke Eaters)
- Top Goaltender: Clay Stevenson (Coquitlam Express)
- Wally Forslund Memorial Trophy (Best Goaltending Duo): Clay Stevenson & Jack Watson (Coquitlam Express)
- Vern Dye Memorial Trophy (regular-season MVP): Kent Johnson (Trail Smoke Eaters)
- Joe Tennant Memorial Trophy (Coach of the Year): Jason Fortier (Coquitlam Express)
- Ron Boileau Memorial Trophy (Best Regular Season Record): Coquitlam Express
- Fred Page Cup (League Champions): Not awarded

== Players selected in 2020 NHL entry draft ==
- Rd7 187: Kienan Draper - Detroit Red Wings (Chilliwack Chiefs)
- Rd7 207: Ethan Bowen - Anaheim Ducks (Chilliwack Chiefs)

== See also ==
- 2019 in ice hockey
- 2020 in ice hockey
- 2020 NHL entry draft
