= Salmon Arm Silverbacks =

Junior ice hockey team

- City: Salmon Arm, British Columbia
- League: British Columbia Hockey League
- Division: Interior Division
- Founded: 2001
- Home arena: Rogers Rink
- Colours: Purple, silver, black, and white
- Owner: Salmon Arm Silverbacks Hockey Club
- General manager: Brooks Christensen
- Head coach: Tyler Shattock
- Website: sasilverbacks.com

The Salmon Arm Silverbacks are a junior ice hockey team from Salmon Arm, British Columbia, Canada. They are a part of the British Columbia Hockey League. The Silverbacks returned a BCHL team to Shuswap/Salmon Arm 12 years after the previous team ceased operations, known at various times as the Totems, Blazers, and Tigers between 1982 and 1989.

== Season-by-season record ==
Note: GP = Games played, W = Wins, L = Losses, T = Ties, OTL = Overtime Losses, PTS = Points, GF = Goals for, GA = Goals against

Season	GP	W	L	T	OTL	GF	GA	PTS	Finish	Playoffs
1982–83	56	26	29	1	—	248	259	53	8th	Lost in Preliminary
1983–84	60	22	38	0	—	357	429	44	8th	Did not qualify
1984–85	52	7	44	1	—	211	420	15	12th	Did not qualify
1985–86	52	10	42	0	—	253	445	20	12th	Did not qualify
1986–87	Folded									
1987–88	52	17	34	1	—	245	308	35	11th	Did not qualify
1988–89	60	26	32	2	—	284	328	54	7th	Lost in Preliminary
2001–02	60	32	23	—	5	249	269	69	3rd in Interior	Lost in Preliminary
2002–03	60	38	19	2	1	281	235	79	2nd in Interior	Lost in Preliminary
2003–04	60	42	17	1	0	300	219	85	1st in Interior	Lost in Finals
2004–05	60	34	22	1	3	268	225	72	3rd in Interior	Lost in Quarter-finals
2005–06	60	41	17	0	2	259	192	84	2nd in Interior	Lost in Semi-finals
2006–07	60	36	21	0	3	291	238	75	4th in Interior	Lost in Quarter-finals
2007–08	60	37	17	3	3	256	201	80	4th BCHL	Lost in Quarter-finals
2008–09	60	40	17	1	2	234	167	83	3rd BCHL	Lost in Semi-finals
2009–10	60	29	25	3	3	227	227	64	9th BCHL	Lost preliminary
2010–11	60	38	19	2	1	239	205	79	3rd, Interior	Lost semi-finals
2011–12	60	16	35	0	9	176	272	41	15th BCHL	Did not qualify
2012–13	56	26	24	2	4	151	172	58	4th, Interior; 10th, BCHL	Lost Division Quarter-finals
2013–14	58	25	24	1	8	177	184	58	5th, Interior; 10th, BCHL	Did not qualify
2014–15	58	28	21	3	6	187	176	65	5th, Interior; 8th, BCHL	Did not qualify
2015–16	58	29	20	5	4	227	184	67	3rd, Interior; 8th, BCHL	Lost First Round, 2–4 (Warriors)
2016–17	58	24	28	3	3	181	222	54	6th of 6, Interior; 12th of 17, BCHL	Lost div. quarter-finals, 1–4 (Smoke Eaters)
2017–18	58	25	29	3	1	172	231	54	7th of 7, Interior; 14th of 17, BCHL	Lost div. quarter-finals, 0–4 (Vipers)
2018–19	58	27	26	—	5	170	203	59	5th of 7, Interior; 10th of 17, BCHL	Lost First Round, 1–4 (Vipers)
2019–20	58	30	23	0	5	182	179	65	3rd of 7, Interior; 6th of 17, BCHL	Won First Round, 4–0 (Grizzlies); Season cancelled due to the COVID-19 pandemic
2020–21	20	9	7	0	2	73	73	22	2nd of 3, Vernon pod 8th of 16, BCHL	Post-season cancelled
2021–22	54	36	12	0	4	204	147	78	2nd of 9, Interior; 2nd of 18, BCHL	Won 1st round, 4-3 (Wild); Lost 2nd round, 4-1 (Warriors)
2022–23	54	27	20	0	4	173	162	61	4th of 9, Interior; 8th of 18, BCHL	Won 1st round, 4-0 (Spruce Kings); Won 2nd round, 4-1 (Vipers); Lost semi-finals, 4-1 (Vees)
2023–24	54	34	17	0	0	180	137	71	3rd of 8, Interior; 4th of 17, BCHL	Won 1st round, 4-0 (Centennials); Won 2nd round, 4-1 (Warriors); Lost semi-finals, 4-3 (Vees)

== Notable alumni ==
- Kris Chucko (Calgary Flames)
- Ryan Duncan (EC Red Bull Salzburg)
- Andrew Ebbett (Anaheim Ducks, Chicago Blackhawks, Minnesota Wild, Phoenix Coyotes, Vancouver Canucks, Pittsburgh Penguins)
- Akito Hirose (Vancouver Canucks)
- Taro Hirose (Detroit Red Wings)
- Josh Manson (Anaheim Ducks, Colorado Avalanche)
- Brady Murray (Los Angeles Kings, HC Lugano)
- Brendon Nash (Montreal Canadiens, HC Kladno)
- Riley Nash (Carolina Hurricanes, Boston Bruins)
- Ben Street (Calgary Flames, Colorado Avalanche, Detroit Red Wings, Anaheim Ducks, New Jersey Devils)
- Travis Zajac (New Jersey Devils, New York Islanders)

== See also ==
- List of ice hockey teams in British Columbia
