= Kamloops Rockets =

Ice hockey team in Kamloops, British Columbia

Kamloops Rockets
City	Kamloops, British Columbia
League	British Columbia Junior Hockey League
Operated	1961–1980
Home Arena	Kamloops Arena
Colours	Green, Black, and White

The Kamloops Rockets were a Tier II Junior "A" ice hockey team from Kamloops, British Columbia, Canada. They were a part of the British Columbia Junior Hockey League.

Kamloops Jr. Rockets 1961 - 1964
Kamloops Kraft Kings 1964 - 1967
Kamloops Rockets 1967 - 1973
Kamloops Braves 1976 - 1977
Kamloops Chiefs 1977 - 1978
Kamloops Rockets 1978 - 1979
Revelstoke Bruins/Rockets 1979 - 1980

== History ==
Founded in 1961, the Rockets won the first three straight league titles and two British Columbia titles winning the Mowat Cup. They won the league again in 1966 and 1971. In 1973, the team was relocated to White Rock as Kamloops was granted a team in the Western Canada Hockey League called the Kamloops Chiefs. The town got another Tier II Junior "A" club in 1976, and the WCHL team folded that same year. In 1980, the team merged with the Revelstoke Bruins and moved to Revelstoke, British Columbia. In 1981, the Kamloops Jr. Oilers were founded and have continued on as the successful Kamloops Blazers ever since.

== Season-by-season record ==
Note: GP = Games Played, W = Wins, L = Losses, T = Ties, OTL = Overtime Losses, GF = Goals for, GA = Goals against

Season	GP	W	L	T	OTL	GF	GA	Points	Finish	Playoffs
1961-62	28	22	6	0	-	169	109	44	1st OMJHL	Won League, won Mowat Cup
1962-63	32	24	5	3	-	229	102	51	2nd OMJHL	Won League
1963-64	35	26	7	2	-	230	126	54	1st OJHL	Won League, won Mowat Cup
1964-65	30	18	11	1	-	154	146	37	1st OJHL	Lost final
1965-66	30	16	14	0	-	143	154	32	2nd OJHL	Won League
1966-67	40	6	34	0	-	-	-	12	4th OJHL	Lost semi-final
1967-68	40	21	19	0	-	221	207	42	2nd BCJHL	Lost final
1968-69	40	9	23	8	-	132	210	26	6th BCJHL	DNQ
1969-70	48	24	19	5	-	191	178	53	4th BCJHL	Lost semi-final
1970-71	60	31	24	5	-	233	198	67	3rd BCJHL Interior	Won League, won Mowat Cup
1971-72	60	24	27	9	-	-	-	57	3rd BCJHL	Lost semi-final
1972-73	62	45	15	2	-	335	223	92	1st BCJHL Interior	Lost semi-final
1976-77	68	23	45	0	-	247	307	46	5th BCJHL Interior	DNQ
1977-78	66	30	35	1	-	343	378	61	4th BCJHL Interior	Lost semi-final
1978-79	62	37	25	0	-	318	282	74	2nd BCJHL Interior	Lost final
1979-80	60	34	25	1	-	343	314	69	2nd BCJHL Interior	Lost quarter-final

== See also ==
- List of ice hockey teams in British Columbia
