= Trail Smoke Eaters =

- City: Trail, British Columbia, Canada
- League: British Columbia Hockey League
- Conference: Interior
- Division: West
- Founded: 1926
- Home arena: Cominco Arena
- Colours: Orange & black
- General manager: Eric Thurston
- Head coach: Eric Thurston
- Website: trailsmokeeaters.com

Franchise history
- 1926–present: Trail Smoke Eaters

The Trail Smoke Eaters are a junior A ice hockey team from Trail, British Columbia, Canada. They are a part of the British Columbia Hockey League (BCHL).

== History ==
The Smoke Eaters (aka Smokies) have existed as both junior and senior teams since the 1920s. The senior Smoke Eaters won two Allan Cup championships, 1938 and 1962, and two Ice Hockey World Championships playing for Canada in 1939 and 1961. The senior Smokies were the last independent ice hockey club to represent Canada in international competition before the Canada men's national ice hockey team was established in 1963.

The junior Smoke Eaters have competed in British Columbia since 1926. Originally, the ice hockey usage of "junior" referred to a general, age-limited, non-professional hockey concept that was distinct from senior and intermediate divisions. Later, the junior divisions in Canada were divided into two levels, Junior A and Junior B. In 1970, Junior A was split again into Major Junior and Junior A. The junior Smoke Eaters have competed in various levels of junior hockey, including Junior A and Junior B divisions. They have also competed for the national Junior Championship Memorial Cup prior to its usage as the Major Junior championship.

In 1931–32, the junior Smoke Eaters won their first of 22 Mowat Cups over a run of 29 seasons. Throughout this run, the Mowat Cup was awarded as the highest level junior hockey championship for the province. During their 22 Mowat Cup winning years, the Smoke Eaters represented British Columbia in the Western Canadian Junior/Junior A Championship, the Abbott Cup. The Smoke Eaters won the Abbott Cup in 1944 and represented Western Canada in the national junior championship Memorial Cup competition, losing all four games to the Oshawa Generals.

By the 1970s, the Smoke Eaters played as a Junior B team in the Kootenay International Junior Hockey League (KIJHL). They joined the Junior A Rocky Mountain Junior Hockey League (RMJHL) from the 1991–92 through 1994–95 seasons. In 1995, the Smoke Eaters bought the Bellingham Ice Hawks franchise in the Junior A British Columbia Hockey League (BCHL), joining that league as the Trail Smoke Eaters for the 1995–96 season.

In 2025, head coach, Tim Fragle, became the winningest coach in franchise history with 112 wins during his 5-year tenure, and was named BCHL Coach of the Year. In March 2025, the Smoke Eaters organization announced that it had extended Fragle's contract through to the end of the 2027 BCHL season. However, in July 2025, it was announced that Fragle was leaving "to pursue new opportunities in hockey." He was replaced by associate coach and assistant GM, Eric Thurston.

== Season-by-season record ==
Note: GP = Games Played, W = Wins, L = Losses, T = Ties, OTL = Overtime Losses, GF = Goals for, GA = Goals against

Season	GP	W	L	T	OTL	GF	GA	Points	Finish	Playoffs
1969–70	32	29	3	0	—	335	86	58	1st, KJHL	KJHL Champions
1970–71	28	26	2	0	—			52	1st, WKHL	WKHL Champions
1971–72	32	21	11	0	—	256	96	42	2nd, WKHL	
1972–73	30	17	13	0	—	194	165	34	3rd, KIJHL	
1973–74	30	11	19	0	—	184	195	22	6th, KIJHL	
1974–75	34	24	10	0	—	270	161	48	2nd, KIJHL	
1975–76	34	24	8	2	—	239	178	50	1st, KIJHL	
1976–77	44	31	13	0	—	329	188	62	2nd, KIJHL	
1977–78	42	33	8	1	—	225	137	67	1st, KIJHL	
1978–79	40	37	3	0	—	245	113	74	1st, KIJHL	KIJHL Champions
1979–80	40	18	22	0	—	219	240	36	9th, KIJHL	
1980–81	40	31	9	0	—	323	186	62	2nd, KIJHL	KIJHL Champions
1981–82	42	28	12	2	—	299	187	58	2nd, KIJHL	
1982–83	42	33	9	0	—	291	191	66	2nd, KIJHL	
1983–84	40	7	33	0	—	172	278	14	12th, KIJHL	
1984–85	40	24	14	2	—	250	201	50	4th, KIJHL	
1985–86	42	34	8	0	—	288	160	68	1st, KIJHL	
1986–87	42	13	29	0	—	239	279	26	6th, KIJHL	
1987–88	42	26	16	0	—	287	232	52	4th, KIJHL	
1988–89	45	33	11	1	—	288	191	67	3rd, KIJHL	
1989–90	40	30	10	0	—	292	181	60	3rd, KIJHL	
1990–91	41	27	14	0	—	227	176	54	2nd, KIJHL	KIJHL Champions
1991–92	52	31	18	3	—	284	219	65	1st, Kootenay	Won Quarterfinals, 4–0 (Dynamiters); Won Semifinals, 4–3 (Colts); Lost Finals, 2–3 (Spruce Kings)
1992–93	52	40	11	—	1	366	227	81	1st, Kootenay	Won Quarterfinals, 4–0 (Thunder); Lost Semifinals, 2–4 (Colts)
1993–94	52	10	40	—	2	207	376	22	5th, Kootenay	did not qualify
1994–95	52	21	31	—	0	243	289	42	5th, Kootenay	did not qualify
1995–96	60	16	39	5	—	214	323	37	4th, Interior	did not qualify
1996–97	60	39	20	1	—	302	241	79	2nd, Interior	Lost Semifinals, 1–4 (Vipers)
1997–98	60	35	23	2	—	222	209	72	3rd, Interior	Lost Semifinals, 1–4 (Panthers)
1998–99	60	14	43	—	3	166	259	31	6th, Interior	did not qualify
1999–00	60	8	47	—	5	155	353	21	6th, Interior	did not qualify
2000–01	60	18	34	—	8	199	293	44	6th, Interior	did not qualify
2001–02	60	29	24	—	7	218	210	65	4th, Interior	Lost Quarterfinals, 0–3 (Panthers)
2002–03	60	31	24	3	2	275	255	67	3rd, Interior	Lost Semifinals, 0–4 (Vipers)
2003–04	60	26	26	0	8	242	237	60	5th, Interior	Lost Quarterfinals, 2–3 (TimberWolves)
2004–05	60	30	21	2	7	220	217	69	4th, Interior	Lost Preliminary, 0–4 (Vees)
2005–06	60	25	27	1	7	212	229	58	5th, Interior	Lost Preliminary, 1–4 (Centennials)
2006–07	60	35	19	0	6	230	200	76	3rd, Interior	Lost Quarterfinals, 1–4 (Vipers)
2007–08	60	23	30	1	6	169	213	53	5th, Interior	Lost Preliminary, 0–3 (Vipers)
2008–09	60	25	31	2	2	188	215	54	6th, Interior	Lost Div. Quarterfinals, 0–3 (Warriors)
2009–10	60	20	32	1	7	216	271	48	6th, Interior	Lost Div. Quarterfinals, 1–4 (Warriors)
2010–11	60	31	23	2	4	198	172	68	5th, Interior	Lost Div. Quarterfinals
2011–12	60	11	42	1	6	151	295	29	6th, Interior	did not qualify
2012–13	56	26	28	0	2	171	229	54	5th, Interior	did not qualify
2013–14	58	10	42	2	4	154	274	26	6th, Interior	did not qualify
2014–15	58	19	33	0	6	208	249	44	6th, Interior	did not qualify
2015–16	58	23	33	2	0	171	251	46	6th, Interior	did not qualify
2016–17	58	26	26	5	1	213	204	68	3rd of 6, Interior; 8th of 17, BCHL	Won Div. Quarterfinals, 4–1 (Silverbacks); Lost Div. Semifinals, 1–4 (Vipers)
2017–18	58	32	21	4	1	218	203	69	4th of 7, Interior; 7th of 17, BCHL	Won Div. Quarterfinals, 4–0 (Warriors); Won Div. Semifinals, 4–3 (Vees); Lost Div. Finals, 1–4 (Wild)
2018–19	58	23	24	—	11	184	207	57	7th of 7, Interior; 13th of 17, BCHL	Won First Round, 4–1 (Centennials); Lost Second Round, 3–4 (Vipers)
2019–20	58	36	17	1	4	222	170	77	2nd of 7, Interior; 4th of 17, BCHL	Won First Round, 4–0 (Spruce Kings); Season cancelled due to the COVID-19 pandemic
2020–21	20	9	11	0	0	47	72	18	2nd of 3, Pentiction Pod; 9th of 16, BCHL	Covid-19 "pod season" - no playoffs
2021–22	54	20	29	1	2	174	217	45	8th of 9, Interior; 15th of 18, BCHL	Lost Div Quarterfinals, 2-4 (Vees)
2022–23	54	20	27	0	3	162	214	47	8th of 9, Interior; 15th of 18, BCHL	Lost Div Quarterfinals, 0-4 (Vees)
2023–24	54	28	20	0	6	186	187	62	5th of 8, Interior; 8th of 17, BCHL	Lost Div Quarterfinals, 0–4 (Vipers)
2024–25	54	35	15	3	1	225	156	74	3rd of 11, Interior; 4th of 21 BCHL	Lost Div Quarterfinals, 2-4 (Bucks)
2025–26	54	30	23	0	1	174	176	61	2nd of 5, Interior West; 5th out of 10, Interior; 10th of 20, BCHL	Lost Div Quarterfinals, 0-4 (Silverbacks)

== Chilliwack/Ladner/Bellingham franchise ==
To secure entry into the BCHL, the Trail Smoke Eaters bought the franchise rights of the Bellingham Ice Hawks of Bellingham, Washington. The Ice Hawks franchise had previously existed in the British Columbia communities of Chilliwack (twice), Langley and Ladner.

Chilliwack Colts 1978–1981
Langley Eagles 1981–1987
Chilliwack Eagles 1987–1989
Ladner Penguins 1989–90
Bellingham Ice Hawks 1990–1995

The Eagles played for six seasons in Langley. Their best season was 1983–84 with a record of 40–8–2, placing third in the league. In the playoffs they defeated the Abbotsford Flyers four games to one, the Nanaimo Clippers four games to two, and then swept the first place Penticton Knights in the league championships. They then won the 1984 Mowat Cup over the Peace Caribou Junior Hockey League champions, Prince George Spruce Kings, and then won the 1984 BC/Alta Championship over Fort Saskatchewan Traders. They lost Abbott Cup to the Weyburn Red Wings in a four-game sweep before the Red Wings went on to win the Centennial Cup.

Note: GP = Games Played, W = Wins, L = Losses, T = Ties, GF = Goals for, GA = Goals against

Season	GP	W	L	T	GF	GA	Points	Finish	Playoffs
1978–79	62	28	31	3	284	287	59	4th, Coastal	Lost Div. Semifinals, 1–4 (Blazers)
1979–80	66	35	30	1	326	328	71	3rd, Coastal	Lost Div. Semifinals, 3–4 (Clippers)
1980–81	35	1	34	0	89	302	2	8th, Coastal	Folded mid-season
1981–82	48	7	41	0	204	405	14	7th, Coastal	did not qualify
1982–83	56	18	37	1	262	317	37	6th, Coastal	did not qualify
1983–84	50	40	8	2	337	192	82	1st Coastal	Won League, Mowat Cup, Doyle Cup
1984–85	52	31	21	0	313	301	62	4th Coastal	Lost Quarterfinals
1985–86	52	12	40	0	232	373	24	6th Coastal	did not qualify
1986–87	52	31	20	1	272	259	63	2nd Coastal	Lost Quarterfinals
1987–88	52	21	31	0	262	360	42	9th, BCJHL	did not qualify
1988–89	60	18	42	0	297	445	36	9th, BCJHL	did not qualify
1989–90	59	22	34	3	300	395	47	7th, BCJHL	Lost Preliminary
1990–91	60	21	34	5	238	315	47	9th, BCJHL	did not qualify
1991–92	60	30	26	4	310	290	64	5th, BCJHL	Lost Finals, 0–4 (Lakers)
1992–93	60	22	35	3	258	314	47	8th, BCJHL	Lost Quarterfinals, 3–4 (Paper Kings)
1993–94	60	18	39	3	250	324	39	9th, BCJHL	did not qualify
1994–95	60	29	28	3	276	284	61	4th, Mainland	Lost in Preliminary, 0–2 (Lakers)

== See also ==
- List of ice hockey teams in British Columbia

== Bibliography ==
- Bailey, Jim (June 12, 2025). "Trail Smoke Eaters owner named BCHL Executive of the Year". Rossland News. Black Press Media.
