= List of ice hockey teams in British Columbia =

The following is a list of ice hockey teams in British Columbia, past and present. It includes the league(s) they play for, and championships won.

== Professional ==
=== National Hockey League ===
| Team | City | Established | Stanley Cups | Notes |
|---|---|---|---|---|
| Vancouver Canucks | Vancouver | 1970 | 0 | |

=== Professional Women's Hockey League ===
| Team | City | Established | Walter Cups | Notes |
|---|---|---|---|---|
| Vancouver Goldeneyes | Vancouver | 2025 | 0 | |

=== Pacific Coast Hockey Association ===
| Team | City | Years active | League titles | Stanley Cups | Notes |
|---|---|---|---|---|---|
| New Westminster Royals | New Westminster | 1911–1914 | 1 | 0 | |
| Vancouver Millionaires | Vancouver | 1911–1924 | 6 | 1 | Became Maroons in 1922; Joined WCHL in 1924 |
| Victoria Aristocrats | Victoria | 1911–1916, 1918–1924 | 2 | 0 | Became Cougars in 1923; Joined WCHL in 1924 |

=== Western Canada Hockey League ===
| Team | City | Years active | League titles | Stanley Cups |
|---|---|---|---|---|
| Vancouver Maroons | Vancouver | 1924–1926 | 0 | 0 |
| Victoria Cougars | Victoria | 1924–1926 | 2 | 1 |

=== World Hockey Association ===
| Team | City | Years active | Avco Cups | Notes |
|---|---|---|---|---|
| Vancouver Blazers | Vancouver | 1973–1975 | 0 | Founded in 1972 as the Miami Screaming Eagles; Became Calgary Cowboys in 1975 |

=== American Hockey League ===
| Team | City | Years active | Calder Cups | Notes |
|---|---|---|---|---|
| Abbotsford Heat | Abbotsford | 2009–2014 | 0 | Previously the Quad City Flames; became Adirondack Flames |
| Abbotsford Canucks | Abbotsford | Since 2021 | 1 | Previously the Utica Comets |

=== ECHL ===
| Team | City | Years active | Kelly Cups | Notes |
|---|---|---|---|---|
| Victoria Salmon Kings | Victoria | 2004–2011 | 0 | Founded in 1988 as the Erie Panthers |

=== Pacific Coast Hockey League ===
| Team | City | Years active | Lester Patrick Cups | Notes |
|---|---|---|---|---|
| New Westminster Royals | New Westminster | 1945–1952 | 1 | Joined Western Hockey League (1952–1974) in 1952. |
| Vancouver Canucks (WHL) | Vancouver | 1945–1952 | 2 | Joined Western Hockey League (1952–1974) in 1952. |
| Victoria Cougars (1949–1961) | Victoria | 1949–1952 | 1 | Joined Western Hockey League (1952–1974) in 1952. |
| Victoria Cubs | Victoria | 1928–1930 | 0 | Just before the 1929–30 season a fire destroyed their home arena and the Cubs played all 18 scheduled home games on the road, divided between Vancouver, BC and Seattle, WA. Moved to Tacoma, WA and became the Tacoma Tigers for the 1930–31 season, then folded. |

=== Western Hockey League (1952–1974) ===
| Team | City | Years active | Lester Patrick Cups |
|---|---|---|---|
| New Westminster Royals | New Westminster | 1952–1959 | 0 |
| Vancouver Canucks (WHL) | Vancouver | 1952–1970 | 4 |
| Victoria Cougars (1949–1961) | Victoria | 1952–1961 | 0 |
| Victoria Maple Leafs | Victoria | 1964–1967 | 1 |

== Senior ice hockey ==
Senior ice hockey clubs
| Team | City | Established | League titles | Allan Cups | Notes |
|---|---|---|---|---|---|
| Powell River Regals | Powell River | 1957 | | 3 | Plays in the West Coast Senior Hockey League (WCSHL); won the league's McCallum Cup in 2026 |
| Fort St. John Flyers | Fort St. John | | | | |
| Hope Icebreakers (senior) | Hope | 2003 | 0 | 0 | Founded in 2003 as a Junior B team; returned to Hope from Mission in 2025 as a Senior AA team in the WCSHL |
| Lake Cowichan Appollos | Lake Cowichan | | 0 | 0 | Senior AA; plays in the WCSHL |
| Nanaimo Steelmen | Nanaimo | 1996 | 0 | 0 | Joined the West Coast Senior AAA hockey league in 1996 and folded in 1998. Played with the Powell River Regals, Seattle, New Westminster and Burnaby. Revived as a Senior AA team playing home games in Nanaimo and Port Alberni; plays in the WCSHL |
| West Coast Walleye | Langley | 2018 | | | |
| Esquimalt Buccaneers | Esquimalt | 2026 | 0 | 0 | Operated by the Esquimalt Hockey Society; joined the WCSHL for the 2026–27 season |

== Junior ice hockey ==
=== Western Hockey League ===
Active WHL franchises
| Team | City | Established | Ed Chynoweth Cups | Memorial Cups | Notes |
|---|---|---|---|---|---|
| Kamloops Blazers | Kamloops | 1981 | 6 | 3 | Established in 1966 as the Estevan Bruins |
| Kelowna Rockets | Kelowna | 1995 | 3 | 1 | Established in 1991 as the Tacoma Rockets |
| Prince George Cougars | Prince George | 1994 | 0 | 0 | Established in 1971 as the Victoria Cougars (WHL) |
| Vancouver Giants | Vancouver | 2001 | 1 | 1 | |
| Victoria Royals | Victoria | 2011 | 0 | 0 | Established in 2006 as the Chiliwack Bruins |

Former WHL franchises
| Team | City | Years active | Ed Chynoweth Cups | Memorial Cups | Notes |
|---|---|---|---|---|---|
| Chilliwack Bruins | Chilliwack | 2006–2011 | 0 | 0 | Became the Victoria Royals in 2011 |
| Kamloops Chiefs | Kamloops | 1973–1977 | 0 | 0 | Founded in 1971 as the Vancouver Nats; Became the Seattle Breakers in 1977 |
| Kelowna Wings | Kelowna | 1982–1985 | 0 | 0 | Became the Spokane Chiefs in 1985 |
| Kootenay Ice | Cranbrook | 1998–2019 | 3 | 1 | Established in 1996 as the Edmonton Ice. Became the Winnipeg Ice in 2019. |
| Nanaimo Islanders | Nanaimo | 1982–1983 | 0 | 0 | Founded in 1966 as the Calgary Buffaloes; Became the New Westminster Bruins in 1983 |
| New Westminster Bruins | New Westminster | 1971–1981 | 4 | 2 | Founded in 1966 as the Estevan Bruins; Became the Kamloops Junior Oilers in 1981 |
| New Westminster Bruins | New Westminster | 1983–1988 | 0 | 0 | Founded in 1966 as the Calgary Buffaloes; Became the Tri-City Americans in 1988 |
| Vancouver Nats | Vancouver | 1971–1973 | 0 | 0 | Became the Kamloops Chiefs in 1973 |
| Victoria Cougars (WHL) | Victoria | 1971–1994 | 1 | 0 | Became the Prince George Cougars in 1994 |

=== British Columbia Hockey League ===
| Team | City | Established | League titles | Doyle Cups | Centennial Cups | Notes |
|---|---|---|---|---|---|---|
| Alberni Valley Bulldogs | Port Alberni | 2002 | 0 | 0 | 0 | Founded in 1998 as the Burnaby Bulldogs |
| Chilliwack Chiefs | Chilliwack | 2011 | 0 | | | Founded in 1998 as the Quesnel Millionaires |
| Coquitlam Express | Coquitlam | 2001 | 2 | 1 | 1 | Played in Burnaby from 2005 to 2010 |
| Cowichan Valley Capitals | Duncan | 1980 | 0 | 0 | 0 | |
| Langley Rivermen | Langley | 2006 | 0 | 0 | 0 | Founded in 1990 as the Chilliwack Chiefs |
| Merritt Centennials | Merritt | 1973 | 1 | 1 | 0 | Founded in 1961 as the Kamloops Rockets |
| Nanaimo Clippers | Nanaimo | 1972 | 5 | 1 | 0 | Played in Esquimalt from 1982 to 1982 |
| Penticton Vees (BCHL) | Penticton | 1961 | 11 | 4 | 1 | |
| Powell River Kings | Powell River | 1988 | 0 | 0 | 0 | Founded in 1976 as the Abbotsford Flyers |
| Prince George Spruce Kings | Prince George | 1972 | 1 | 1 | 0 | Founded in 1972 in the Pacific Northwest Hockey League |
| Salmon Arm Silverbacks | Salmon Arm | 2001 | 0 | 0 | 0 | |
| Surrey Eagles | Surrey | 1991 | 3 | 2 | 1 | Founded in 1962 as the New Westminster Royals in the Pacific Coast Junior Hockey League |
| Trail Smoke Eaters | Trail | 1995 | 0 | 0 | 0 | |
| Vernon Vipers | Vernon | 1961 | 9 | 5 | 4 | |
| Victoria Grizzlies | Victoria | 1994 | 1 | 0 | 0 | Founded as the Victoria Salsa |
| West Kelowna Warriors | West Kelowna | 1994 | 1 | 0 | 1 | Founded as the Langley Thunder |

=== Junior B leagues ===
Junior B leagues
| League | Region | Established | Provincial titles | Regional titles |
|---|---|---|---|---|
| British Columbia Hockey Conference | British Columbia | 2026 | 0 | 0 |
| Kootenay International Junior Hockey League | B.C. Interior & Washington state | 1962 | 16 | 4 |
| Pacific Junior Hockey League | Lower Mainland | 1967 | 16 | 2 |
| Vancouver Island Junior Hockey League | Vancouver Island | 1974 | 5 | 1 |
| Western International Junior Hockey League | British Columbia & Washington state | 2026 | 0 | 0 |

=== Vancouver Island Junior Hockey League ===
Current and former VIJHL franchises
| Team | City | Established | Provincial titles | Telus Cups | Notes |
|---|---|---|---|---|---|
| Saanich Braves | Saanich | 1969 | 0 | 0 | |
| Juan de Fuca Grizzlies | Colwood | 1969 | 0 | 0 | Established in 1969 as the Juan de Fuca Orcas |
| Nanaimo Clippers | Nanaimo | 1969 | 0 | 0 | |
| Victoria Kings | Saanich | 1969 | 4 | 0 | Established in 1969 as the Racquet Club Kings |
| Kerry Park Islanders | Mill Bay | 1970 | 0 | 0 | |
| Powell River Regals | Powell River | 1981 | 0 | 0 | |
| Sooke Thunderbirds | Sooke | 1970 | 0 | 0 | |
| Cowichan Valley Capitals | Duncan | 1969 | 0 | 0 | |
| Alberni Valley Bulldogs | Port Alberni | 1980 | 0 | 0 | |
| Campbell River Storm | Campbell River | 1997 | 0 | 0 | |
| Campbell River Tyees | Campbell River | 1976 | 0 | 0 | |
| Comox Valley Chiefs | Comox | 1969 | 0 | 0 | |
| Lake Cowichan Lakers | Lake Cowichan | 1985 | 0 | 0 | |
| Victoria Ice Hawks | Esquimalt | 1991 | 0 | 0 | |
| Oceanside Breakers | Parksville | 1969 | 0 | 0 | |
| Tri-Port Eagles | Port Hardy | 1977 | 0 | 0 | |
| Gold River Ravens | Gold River | 1982 | 0 | 0 | |
| Peninsula Eagles | Sidney | 1972 | 0 | 0 | |

== Semi-professional, collegiate and minor hockey ==
=== Western Women's Hockey League ===
| Team | City | Years active | League titles | Notes |
|---|---|---|---|---|
| British Columbia Breakers | Langley | 2004–2006, 2007–2009 | 0 | |

=== National Women's Hockey League (1999) ===
| Team | City | Years active | League titles | Notes |
|---|---|---|---|---|
| British Columbia Breakers | Langley | 2006–2007 | 0 | Member of WWHL 2004–2006 |
| Vancouver Griffins | Vancouver | 2001–2003 | 0 | |

=== Senior Female AAA SCFAHL / BCAHA ===
| Team | City | Established | Provincial titles | National titles | Notes |
|---|---|---|---|---|---|
| BC Outback | Kamloops | 1999 | 3 | 2 | last 3 AAA senior Prov |
| Twisters AAA | Surrey | 1998 | 0 | 0 | been to 4 provincials (host) |
| Killarney Knights | Vancouver | 1991 | 3 | 3 | |
| Pacific Steelers | Richmond | 1997 | 3 | 3 | Sends top players to US universities |
| Storm U-21 Jr | Surrey | 2005 | 0 | 0 | |

=== Canada West Universities Athletic Association ===
| Team | City | Established | Conference titles | University Cups | Women's titles | Notes |
|---|---|---|---|---|---|---|
| UBC Thunderbirds | Vancouver | 1961 | | 0 | 0 | |

=== British Columbia Intercollegiate Hockey League ===
| Team | City | Established | BCIHL Championships | Notes |
|---|---|---|---|---|
| Selkirk College | Castlegar | | 4 | |
| Simon Fraser Clan | Burnaby | | 3 | |
| VIU Mariners | Nanaimo | 2017 | 0 | |
| Victoria Vikes | Victoria | | 3 | |

== League, regional and national championships ==
| Championship | Times won | Description |
| Stanley Cup | 2 | Canadian amateur champion |
| Stanley Cup | 0 | National Hockey League champion |
| PCHA Championship | 8 | Pacific Coast Hockey Association champion |
| WCHL Championship | 2 | Western Canada Hockey League champion |
| Lester Patrick Cup | 9 | PCHL/WHL champion |
| President's Cup | 11 | Western Hockey League champion |
| Memorial Cup | 5 | Canadian Major-Junior national champion |
| Allan Cup | 10 | Canadian senior national champion |
| Doyle Cup | 21 | Alberta/B.C. Junior "A" regional championship |
| Royal Bank Cup | 9 | Canadian Junior "A" national champion |
| Keystone Cup | 4 | Western Canada Junior "B" champion |
| Presidents' Trophy | 2 | National Hockey League champions |

== See also ==
- British Columbia Amateur Hockey Association
- 2006 World Junior Ice Hockey Championships
