= Chilliwack Bruins (BCJHL) =

- City: Chilliwack, British Columbia
- League: British Columbia Hockey League
- Operated: 1970-81
- Home arena: Chilliwack Coliseum
- Colours: Black and Gold

Franchise history
- 1970-1976: Chilliwack Bruins
- 1976-1978: Chilliwack Bruins (PJHL)
- 1978-1981: Chilliwack Colts

The Chilliwack Bruins were a Junior "A" ice hockey team. The Bruins played was located in Chilliwack, in the British Columbia Junior Hockey League (BCJHL).

== History ==
The Chilliwack Bruins were first formed in 1970 as a member of the British Columbia Junior Hockey League (BCJHL). The club was founded as a farm team for the WHL's Estevan Bruins.

After a 1975–76 season which saw the Bruins finish last in the BCJHL, the team joined the three-year-old Pacific Junior A Hockey League (PJHL). However, after an uneven performance in what proved to be a very competitive PJHL in the 1976–77 season, followed by just a single win (in 48 games) during the PJHL's 1977–78 season, the team returned to the BCJHL for the 1978–79 season, changing its name to the Chilliwack Colts.

The Colts performed poorly their first season back in the BCJHL, and competition was even tougher when the PJHL merged with the BCJHL for the 1979–1980 season. The Colts did not make it to the end of their third season back in the BCJHL, folding three-quarters of the way through the 1980–81 season, with just one victory in 35 games.

The community of Chilliwack did not see Junior "A" hockey again until the Richmond Sockeyes relocated to the Fraser Valley city after the 1990–91 season.

== Season-by-season record ==
Note: GP = Games Played, W = Wins, L = Losses, T = Ties, OTL = Overtime Losses, GF = Goals for, GA = Goals against

Season	League	GP	W	L	T	OTL	GF	GA	Points	Finish	Playoffs
1970-71	BCJHL	60	12	43	5	-	183	353	29	4th BCJHL Central	Lost division final
1971-72	BCJHL	60	25	31	4	-	--	--	54	4th BCJHL	Lost semi-final
1972-73	BCJHL	61	29	31	1	-	268	287	59	2nd BCJHL Central	Lost final
1973-74	BCJHL	64	22	39	3	-	251	326	47	3rd BCJHL Coastal	Lost semi-final
1974-75	BCJHL	66	34	32	0	-	321	342	68	2nd BCJHL Coastal	Lost semi-final
1975-76	BCJHL	66	16	49	1	-	230	417	33	5th BCJHL Coastal	Lost quarter-final
1976-77	PJHL	48				-					DNQ
1977-78	PJHL	48	1	47	0	-					DNQ
1978-79	BCJHL	62	28	31	3	-	284	287	59	4th BCJHL Coastal	Lost semi-final
1979-80	BCJHL	66	35	30	1	-	326	328	71	3rd BCJHL Coastal	Lost semi-final
1980-81	BCJHL	35	1	34	0	-	89	302	2	8th BCJHL Coastal	DNQ

== See also ==
- List of ice hockey teams in British Columbia
- Chilliwack Chiefs
- Langley Chiefs
- Chilliwack Bruins
