= Mowat Cup =

Junior ice hockey trophy

- Sport: Junior ice hockey
- League: BCHC
- Competition: Provincial championship
- Presented by: BC Hockey

History
- Most recent: Grand Forks Border Bruins
- Next ceremony: 16 April 2027
- Website: bchchockey.ca

The Mowat Cup is a trophy that is awarded annually by the British Columbia Amateur Hockey Association (BC Hockey) to the Junior A provincial championship team. In April 2027, it will be awarded to the inaugural-season champions of the British Columbia Hockey Conference (BCHC).

== History ==
The Mowat Cup was donated to the British Columbia Amateur Hockey Association by John Mowat in 1927. The first Mowat Cup playoff took place in 1928 in Vancouver. It was a single match between Fernie and Ex-King George.

In 1931–32 began a dynasty for the Trail Smoke Eaters, which went on to win 22 Mowat Cup titles in 29 seasons. In 1961–62, the inaugural season of the Okanagan-Mainline Junior "A" Hockey League (OMJHL), the OMJHL championship Kamloops Rockets swept the Trail Smoke Eaters to win the Cup. The last Mowat Cup victory for the Trail Smoke Eaters was in 1962–63 against the New Westminster Royals of the Pacific Coast Junior Hockey League (PCJHL).

In 1967–68, the British Columbia Junior A Hockey League (BCJHL) was formed when the New Westminster Royals and Victoria Cougars of the PCJHL merged with the four-team Okanagan Junior Hockey League. The Penticton Broncos won the Mowat Cup that year.

From 1999–2016, the Mowat Cup was awarded in tandem with the BCHL league championship Fred Page Cup. The BCHL retired the Mowat Cup in 2017.

From 2024–2026, the championship teams from the KIJHL and the PJHL competed for the Cup and the title of provincial champions.

In April 2027, the Mowat Cup will be awarded to the inaugural-season champions of the British Columbia Hockey Conference (BCHC).

== Champions ==
- 1928 Fernie (Roy Kirkpatrick)
- 1929 Nelson Cubs
- 1930 King George of the Vancouver City Amateur Hockey League
- 1931 Ex-King George, Vancouver
- 1932 Trail Smoke Eaters, (R.E. Wilson)
- 1933 Trail Smoke Eaters, (William 'Scotty' Ross)
- 1934 Trail Smoke Eaters, (William 'Scotty' Ross)
- 1935 King George of the Vancouver City Amateur Hockey League
- 1936 Trail Smoke Eaters (Steve Matovich)
- 1937 Trail Smoke Eaters (Steve Matovich)
- 1938 Trail Smoke Eaters (Steve Matovich)
- 1939 Trail Smoke Eaters (William 'Scotty' Ross)
- 1940 Trail Smoke Eaters (William 'Scotty' Ross)
- 1941 No Competition
- 1942 No Competition
- 1943 Trail Smoke Eaters (Gerry Thompson)
- 1944 Trail Smoke Eaters (Gerry Thompson)
- 1945 No Competition
- 1946 Nanaimo Clippers (Walter 'Bus' Matthews)
- 1947 Trail Jr. Smoke Eaters (Gerry Thomson)
- 1948 Trail Jr. Smoke Eaters (Hedley Marshall)
- 1949 Trail Jr. Smoke Eaters (Jimmy Anderson)
- 1950 Trail Jr. Smoke Eaters (Jimmy Anderson)
- 1951 Trail Jr. Smoke Eaters (Ron Gardiner)
- 1952 Trail Jr. Smoke Eaters (Jimmy Anderson)
- 1953 Vernon Juniors (Bud Anderson)
- 1954 Trail Jr. Smoke Eaters (Robert Milne)
- 1955 Trail Jr. Smoke Eaters (Leo Soligo)
- 1956 Vernon Juniors (Sarge Sammartino)
- 1957 Trail Jr. Smoke Eaters (Jimmy Mailey)
- 1958 Warfield Juniors (Robert Clements)
- 1959 Trail Jr. Smoke Eaters (Robert Clements)
- 1960 Penticton Vees(Bernie Bathgate)
- 1961 Trail Smoke Eaters (Ray Hamilton)
- 1962 Kamloops Rockets (Kenny Stewart) (BCJHL)
- 1963 Trail Smoke Eaters (Ray Hamilton)
- 1964 Kamloops Rockets (Kenny Stewart)(BCJHL)
- 1965 New Westminster Royals (Robert Bob Fenton)
- 1966 New Westminster Royals (Robert Bob Fenton)
- 1967 New Westminster Royals (Robert "Bob" Fenton)
- 1968 Penticton Broncos (Jack Taggert)
- 1969 Victoria Cougars (Doug Anderson)
- 1970 Vernon Essos (Oddie Lowe)
- 1971 Kamloops Rockets (Joe Tennant)
- 1972 Vernon Essos (Oddie Lowe)
- 1973 Penticton Broncos (Don Slater)
- 1974 Bellingham Blazers (Lawrence Gingras)
- 1976 Nor Wes Caps (Pac A)(Brian Crowe)
- 1977 Richmond Sockeyes (Pac A)(J. Henderson)
- 1978 Merritt Centennials (Joe Tennant)
- 1979 Richmond Sockeyes (Pac A)(J. Wild, D. Purdy)
- 1980 Penticton Knights (Marc Pezzin)
- 1981 Penticton Knights (Marc Pezzin)
- 1982 Penticton Knights (Marc Pezzin)
- 1983 Abbotsford Flyers (Don Berry, John Olver)
- 1984 Langley Eagles (John Olver, P. Logan)
- 1985 Penticton Knights (Rick Kozuback, N. Iannone)
- 1986 Penticton Knights (Rick Kozuback, N. Iannone) (CENTENNIAL CUP CHAMPIONS OF CANADA)
- 1987 Richmond Sockeyes (Orland Kurtenbach) (CENTENNIAL CUP CHAMPIONS OF CANADA)
- 1988 Vernon Lakers (Ernie Gare, George Fargher)
- 1989 Vernon Lakers (Ernie Gare, Ed Johnstone)
- 1990 New Westminster Royals (John Olver, D. Pisiak, V. Lemire, Harvey Smyl)
- 1991 Vernon Lakers (Ed Johnstone, Keith Chase) (CENTENNIAL CUP CHAMPIONS OF CANADA)
- 1992 Vernon Lakers (Ed Johnstone, Phil Esposito)
- 1993 Kelowna Spartans (Jim Hammett) (CENTENNIAL CUP CHAMPIONS OF CANADA)
- 1994 Kelowna Spartans (Jim Hammett)
- 1995 Chilliwack Chiefs (Harvey Smyl)
- 1996 Vernon Vipers (Rob Bremner, Troy Mick) (ROYAL BANK CUP CHAMPIONS OF CANADA)
- 1997 South Surrey Eagles (Rick Lanz, J. Short, Mark Holick)
- 1998 South Surrey Eagles (Mark Holick, J. Short) (ROYAL BANK CUP CHAMPIONS OF CANADA)
- 1999 Vernon Vipers (Troy Mick, Joe Oliver) (ROYAL BANK CUP CHAMPIONS OF CANADA)
- 2000 Chilliwack Chiefs (Harvey Smyl)
- 2001 Victoria Salsa (Cambell Blair, J. Lund, J. Read)
- 2002 Chilliwack Chiefs (Harvey Smyl)
- 2003 Vernon Vipers (Mike Vandecamp, Bob Dever, Shawn Bourgeios)
- 2004 Nanaimo Clippers (Bill Bestwick)
- 2005 Surrey Eagles (Rick Hillier)
- 2006 Burnaby Express (Rick Lanz, Bobby Vermette, Dave McLellan, Kolin Kriitmaa) (ROYAL BANK CUP CHAMPIONS OF CANADA)
- 2007 Nanaimo Clippers (Bill Bestwick)
- 2008 Penticton Vees (Fred Harbinson)
- 2009 Vernon Vipers (Mark Ferner, Jason Williamson) (ROYAL BANK CUP CHAMPIONS OF CANADA)
- 2010 Vernon Vipers (Mark Ferner, Jason Williamson) (ROYAL BANK CUP CHAMPIONS OF CANADA)
- 2011 Vernon Vipers (Mark Ferner, Jason Williamson)
- 2012 Penticton Vees (Fred Harbinson) (ROYAL BANK CUP CHAMPIONS OF CANADA)
- 2013 Surrey Eagles (Matt Erhart, Peter Schaefer)
- 2014 Coquitlam Express (Barry Wolf, Rob Boyd)
- 2015 Penticton Vees (Fred Harbinson, Steve Cawley, Nick Fuher)
- 2016 West Kelowna Warriors (Rylan Ferster, Shae Naka, Cory Cross) (ROYAL BANK CUP CHAMPIONS OF CANADA)
- 2017 Penticton Vees (Fred Harbinson, Jason Becker, Matt Fraser)
- 2018 Wenatchee Wild (Bliss Littler, Chris Clark, Michael Zucker, Leigh Mendelson)
- 2019 Prince George Spruce Kings (Adam Maglio, Alex Evin)
- 2020 Not awarded
- 2021 Not awarded
- 2022 Penticton Vees (Fred Harbinson, Steve Cawley, Patrick Sexton, Cam Barker)
- 2024 Revelstoke Grizzlies (Jiri Novak, Daniel Arnost, Ryan Petrovic)
- 2025 Grand Forks Border Bruins(David Hnatiuk, Tayden Woods, Dr. Mark Szynkaruk)
