= 7th Saskatchewan Legislature =

The 7th Legislative Assembly of Saskatchewan was elected in the Saskatchewan general election held in June 1929. The assembly sat from September 4, 1929, to May 25, 1934. The Liberal Party led by James Garfield Gardiner attempted to form a minority government but were defeated by a motion of no confidence. The Conservative Party led by James Thomas Milton Anderson then formed a coalition government with the support of the Progressive Party and independent members. The Liberals led by Gardiner formed the official opposition.

James Fraser Bryant served as speaker for the assembly in 1929. Robert Sterritt Leslie replaced Bryant as speaker in 1930.

== Members of the Assembly ==
The following members were elected to the assembly in 1929:

Electoral district	Member	Party	First elected / previously elected	No.# of term(s)
Arm River	Duncan Selby Hutcheon	Conservative	1929	1st term
Bengough	Herman Kersler Warren	Conservative	1929	1st term
Biggar	William Willoughby Miller	Conservative	1929	1st term
Cannington	Samson Wallace Arthur	Independent	1929	1st term
Canora	Anton O. Morken	Liberal	1929	1st term
Cumberland (Note: Election held July 16, 1929)	Deakin Alexander Hall	Liberal	1913, 1922	5th term*
Cut Knife	George John McLean	Independent	1929	1st term
Cut Knife	George John McLean	Conservative	1929	1st term
Cypress	John Edward Gryde	Conservative	1929	1st term
Elrose	James Cobban	Conservative	1929	1st term
Estevan	Eleazer William Garner	Liberal	1929	1st term
Estevan	David McKnight (1930)	Conservative	1930	1st term
Estevan	Norman L. McLeod (1931)	Liberal	1931	1st term
Francis	Samuel Norval Horner	Progressive	1929	1st term
Francis	Samuel Norval Horner	Conservative	1929	1st term
Gravelbourg	Benjamin Franklin McGregor	Liberal	1925	2nd term
Hanley	Reginald Stipe	Progressive	1925	2nd term
Hanley	Reginald Stipe	Conservative	1925	2nd term
Happyland	Donald McPherson Strath	Liberal	1929	1st term
Humboldt	Henry Mathies Therres	Liberal	1921	3rd term
Île-à-la-Crosse (Note: Election held August 12, 1929)	A. Jules Marion	Liberal	1926	2nd term
Jack Fish Lake	Donald M. Finlayson	Liberal	1908	6th term
Kerrobert	Robert Leith Hanbidge	Conservative	1929	1st term
Kindersley	Ebenezer Samuel Whatley	Progressive	1925	2nd term
Kindersley	Ebenezer Samuel Whatley	Farmer-Labour Group	1925	2nd term
Kindersley	Ebenezer Samuel Whatley	Conservative	1925	2nd term
Kinistino	Charles McIntosh	Liberal	1925	2nd term
Kinistino	Charles McIntosh	Conservative	1925	2nd term
Kinistino	Jack Taylor (1933)	Liberal	1917, 1933	3rd term*
Last Mountain	Jacob Benson	Progressive	1929	1st term
Last Mountain	Jacob Benson	Farmer-Labour Group	1929	1st term
Lloydminster	Robert James Gordon	Liberal	1917	4th term
Lumsden	James Fraser Bryant	Conservative	1929	1st term
Maple Creek	George Spence	Liberal	1917, (Note: Notukeu) 1927	5th term*
Melfort	Rupert James Greaves	Conservative	1929	1st term
Milestone	Joseph Victor Patterson	Independent	1929	1st term
Moose Jaw City	John Alexander Merkley	Conservative	1929	1st term
Moose Jaw City	Robert Henry Smith	Conservative	1929	1st term
Moose Jaw County	Sinclair Alexander Whittaker	Conservative	1929	1st term
Moosomin	Frederick Dennis Munroe	Conservative	1929	1st term
Morse	Richard Percy Eades	Conservative	1929	1st term
North Qu'Appelle	James Garfield Gardiner	Liberal	1914	5th term
Notukeu	Alexander Lothian Grant	Liberal	1926	2nd term
Pelly	Reginald John Marsden Parker	Liberal	1929	1st term
Pheasant Hills	Charles Morton Dunn	Liberal	1929	1st term
Pipestone	William John Patterson	Liberal	1921	3rd term
Prince Albert	Thomas Clayton Davis	Liberal	1925	2nd term
Redberry	George Cockburn	Liberal	1921 (Note: First elected as a Progressive)	3rd term
Regina City	Murdoch Alexander MacPherson	Conservative	1925	2nd term
Regina City	James Grassick	Conservative	1929	1st term
Rosetown	Nathaniel Given	Conservative	1929	1st term
Rosthern	John Michael Uhrich	Liberal	1921	3rd term
Saltcoats	Asmundur Loptson	Liberal	1929	1st term
Saskatoon City	James Thomas Milton Anderson	Conservative	1925	2nd term
Saskatoon City	Howard McConnell	Conservative	1927	2nd term
Saskatoon County	Charles Agar	Liberal	1921	3rd term
Shellbrook	Edgar Sidney Clinch	Liberal	1915	5th term
Souris	William Oliver Fraser	Conservative	1917, 1929	2nd term*
South Qu'Appelle	Anton Huck	Liberal	1925	2nd term
Swift Current	William Wensley Smith	Conservative	1929	1st term
The Battlefords	Samuel Wesley Huston	Independent	1929	1st term
Thunder Creek	Harold Alexander Lilly	Conservative	1929	1st term
Tisdale	Walter Clutterbuck Buckle	Conservative	1925	2nd term
Touchwood	John Mason Parker	Liberal	1917	4th term
Turtleford	Charles Arthur Ayre	Liberal	1929	1st term
Vonda	James Hogan	Liberal	1917	4th term
Wadena	John Robeson Taylor	Independent	1929	1st term
Weyburn	Robert Sterritt Leslie	Progressive	1929	1st term
Weyburn	Robert Sterritt Leslie	Conservative	1929	1st term
Wilkie	Alexander John McLeod	Conservative	1929	1st term
Willow Bunch	Charles William Johnson	Liberal	1929	1st term
Wolseley	William George Bennett	Conservative	1921, 1929	2nd term
Wynyard	Wilhelm Hans Paulson	Liberal	1912, 1924	5th term*
Yorkton	Alan Carl Stewart	Independent	1929	1st term

== Party standings ==
Affiliation	Members
Conservative Party of Saskatchewan	24
Progressive	5
Independent	6
Liberal	28
Total	63
Coalition Majority	7

== By-elections ==
By-elections were held to replace members for various reasons:

Electoral district	Member elected	Party	Election date	Reason
Lumsden	James Fraser Bryant	Conservative	September 30, 1929	JF Bryant ran for reelection after being named to cabinet
Moose Jaw City	John Alexander Merkley	Conservative	September 30, 1929	JA Merkley ran for reelection after being named to cabinet
Regina City	Murdoch Alexander MacPherson	Conservative	September 30, 1929	MA MacPherson ran for reelection after being named to cabinet
Saskatoon City	Howard McConnell	Conservative	September 30, 1929	H McConnell ran for reelection after being named to cabinet
Saskatoon City	James Thomas Milton Anderson	Conservative	September 30, 1929	JTM Anderson ran for reelection after forming a coalition government
Moosomin	Frederick Dennis Munroe	Conservative	October 7, 1929	FD Munroe ran for reelection after being named to cabinet
Tisdale	Walter Clutterbuck Buckle	Conservative	October 7, 1929	WC Buckle ran for reelection after being named to cabinet
Yorkton	Alan Carl Stewart	Independent	October 7, 1929	AC Stewart ran for reelection after being named to cabinet
Estevan	David McKnight	Conservative	December 23, 1930 (Note: McKnight's election was declared void on February 9, 1931, after an appeal)	EW Garner resigned seat
Estevan	Norman L. McLeod	Liberal	February 9, 1931 (Note: The Court of Appeal found that the election was void and the seat was declared vacant on November 7, 1932)	McLeod was declared elected by the assembly because ballots had been tampered with in the 1930 by-election
Kinistino	John Richard Parish Taylor	Liberal	May 22, 1933	C McIntosh named to cabinet as Minister of Natural Resources, ran for reelection and was subsequently defeated
