= Norman Leslie McLeod =

Canadian politician

Norman Leslie McLeod MLA
- Portrait taken from 1934 Province of Saskatchewan 8th legislative assembly

Member of the Legislative Assembly of Saskatchewan
- In office 1938–1944
- Preceded by: Jesse P. Tripp
- Succeeded by: Charles David Cuming
- Constituency: Souris-Estevan

Member of the Legislative Assembly of Saskatchewan
- In office 1934–1938
- Preceded by: Seat Vacant
- Succeeded by: Riding re-distributed
- Constituency: Bromhead

Member of the Legislative Assembly of Saskatchewan
- In office 1931–1932
- Preceded by: Eleazer William Garner
- Succeeded by: Seat Vacant
- Constituency: Estevan

Personal details
- Born: Norman Leslie McLeod; 13 February 1892 Melita, Manitoba
- Died: September 23, 1949 (aged 57) Estevan, Saskatchewan
- Party: Liberal
- Spouse(s): Helen May Brady, Minerva Jean Johnston

Norman Leslie McLeod (February 17, 1892 – September 23, 1949) was a teacher, and school principal in Unity Saskatchewan, and a farmer, merchant and political figure in Estevan Saskatchewan. He was a member of the legislative assembly of Saskatchewan for Estevan area ridings. He represented Estevan from 1931 to 1932 and from 1934 to 1938 (when his riding was named Bromhead) and he represented Souris-Estevan from 1938 to 1944 in the Legislative Assembly of Saskatchewan as a Liberal.

== Early life ==
He was born in Melita, Manitoba, the son of John McLeod (1860-1938) and Sarah Hannah Harding (1866-1952). His parents soon moved to the future town of Estevan in mid-1892, opening up a shop (McLeod's Meat Market) in town soon after, and homesteaded north of town by 1901. Norman was educated in Estevan public and high schools, followed by Regina Normal School for teacher training (1909 and 1916). He left to study at the University of Manitoba writing his summer thesis "Souris Valley Bridge" in 1912. He received his degree of Bachelor of Science in 1914. He may have briefly worked for the railways, but also returned to Regina to complete his teacher training in 1916. He went to work at the school in Unity, Saskatchewan. Norman was first married to Helen May Brady (Note: Prior to her mother Ida Helen's death on May 30, 1911, Helen May is recorded as Nellie May in records (Canada Census 1901, 1906, plus Manitoba Vital Statistics February 28, 1894 birth record Reg Num: 1894,006060)) on June 21, 1916 and had 2 children who died in infancy (Eileen Marjory June 15, 1917 – March 21, 1922, and Albert Lawrence February 3, 1923 – September 3, 1923). His first wife died in the town of her childhood, Reston, R.M. Pipestone, Manitoba on August 15, 1923. In Edmonton Alberta on July 2, 1924, Norman McLeod married Minerva Jean Johnston at a private home. They honeymooned on a cross-country trip as far east as Quebec City before returning to Estevan and then to Unity. Within 2 years they moved to Estevan to take over the running of John McLeod's businesses when he became ill. Norman served on the town council for Estevan and the local school board.

== Politics ==
He first ran for the Saskatchewan Legislature for the riding of Estevan in a by-election held on December 23, 1930 after Eleazer William Garner resigned his seat. When the legislature opened in early January 1931 the seat was still vacant pending a recount before Judge E. R. Wylie. In a very close count, he had been initially declared elected by the returning officer but in the recount was defeated by David McKnight for the seat in the provincial assembly The election was contested, with claims from both parties (Liberal and Conservative) of improprieties. Claims of tampered ballots were reported on by H.E. Sampson, and that report verbally accepted by the Conservative Premier lead to both sides deciding to drop their legal claims so that the legislature could decide who should sit. At the last moment Mr. McKnight changed his mind on the arranged agreement leading to his legal counsel resigning. McLeod was declared elected on February 9, 1931 by a vote of the provincial assembly. The legislature had left open the option of a constituent appealing their decision and a Mr. Lamb soon did so. Norman McLeod's election was subsequently overturned by a decision of Sir Frederick Haultain and that decision was upheld by the Saskatchewan Court of Appeal on November 7, 1932. The decision was based upon the fact that the number of votes cast by unqualified persons (17) was greater than the number of votes in McLeod's majority (5). The appeal court allowed that the unqualified voters may have voted for McKnight and left open a further action by the legislature to appoint Mr. McLeod. However planned redistricting would eliminate the Estevan riding in the next election and it was thought the election was less than 12 months away. The seat remained vacant until the general election held in 1934, when McLeod was elected in the new Bromhead riding. He later represented the combined riding of Souris-Estevan after winning in the 1938 provincial general election when fellow Liberal MLA Jesse Pichard Tripp did not run again. (Tripp became a Federal MP in 1940). McLeod was defeated by Charles David Cuming when he ran for re-election to the assembly in 1944.

== Later life and death ==
After his defeat he continued to be active with provincial and federal political groups. He was a president of the rotary club (1936-1937) and a member of the local masonic lodge. He died at home on Friday September 23, 1949 after spending a week in hospital for a heart ailment. He was survived by his wife, daughter, mother, brother and 2 sisters.

In 1932, McLeod donated the McLeod Trophy to the Estevan Collegiate Institute for a 4-game high school basketball series played against Weyburn. The still named 'McLeod Series' of games have been played for most of the 80 years that followed. The series continues today between teams from Estevan Comprehensive School and Weyburn Comprehensive School.
