= Robert Kohaly =

Canadian politician

Robert Kohaly (July 9, 1921 – October 24, 2001) was a lawyer and political figure in Saskatchewan. He represented Souris-Estevan from 1953 to 1956 in the Legislative Assembly of Saskatchewan as a Progressive Conservative.

He was born in Fredericton, New Brunswick and grew up in Toronto, Winnipeg and Saskatoon, Saskatchewan. He served overseas with the South Saskatchewan Regiment during World War II and was wounded at Dieppe. After the war, Kohaly continued his studies at the University of Saskatchewan, receiving a law degree in 1950. He set up practice in Estevan. Kohaly was elected to the provincial assembly in a 1953 by-election held following the death of John Edward McCormack. After he was defeated when he ran for reelection in 1956, he returned to practising law. Kohaly served as president of the Saskatchewan branch and as national president of the Royal Canadian Legion.
