= Estevan Comprehensive School =

Location
- 255 Spruce Drive; Estevan, Saskatchewan, S4A 2A6; Canada
- Coordinates: 49.1511°N 102.9711°W

Information
- School type: High School
- Motto: "Excellence, Commitment and Success"
- Founded: 1969
- School board: South East Cornerstone Public School Division
- Principal: James Jones
- Grades: 9-12
- Enrollment: 752
- Language: English
- Area: Estevan, Saskatchewan
- Colour: Blue red white
- Mascot: Electroman
- Team name: Elecs
- Website: echs.secpsd.ca

Estevan Comprehensive High School (also known as ECS or "The Comp" locally) is located in Estevan, Saskatchewan, Canada. ECS opened in September 1969. As of 2022, the school had a population of 752 students.

The school colors are blue, red and white. 'Electroman' is the school's mascot, loosely inspired by the Norse god Thor.

== History ==
ECS opened in 1969 to replace the former Estevan Collegiate Institute, for $3.7 million with a maximum student capacity of 1,100. The former high school became the city's junior high until its demolition in 2005.

Features of the 193,000 square foot building include a 'cafetorium', which can function as both the school's cafeteria and its auditorium, as well as a central courtyard with a palm tree in the center.

As a comprehensive high school, ECS offers a range of classes for students including those focused on trades like autobody and mechanics along with traditional high school options.

Given that the school has never reached its intended capacity, plans are being explored to add middle school grades to ECS in the future.

== Extracurriculars ==
Athletic teams at ECS compete under the name "Elecs" in a wide range of sports like basketball, volleyball and soccer.

One of the most highly anticipated sports events of the year is the annual McLeod Series against the rival Weyburn Comprehensive School, a four-game total points series named for Norman Leslie McLeod, who donated the trophy in the early 1930s.

Other extracurricular offerings include various bands, drama performances and the ECS Radio Show, which airs on CHSN-FM.
