= Kim Thorson =

Canadian lawyer and politician (1932–2026)

Kim Thorson (March 2, 1932 – January 7, 2026) was a Canadian lawyer and politician in Saskatchewan. He represented Souris-Estevan from 1956 to 1960 as a Co-operative Commonwealth Federation (CCF) member and from 1971 to 1975 as a New Democratic Party (NDP) member in the Legislative Assembly of Saskatchewan.

== Early life and education ==
Thorson was born in Macoun, Saskatchewan on March 2, 1932, the son of Miles Thorson (1900–1932) and Mary Ethel Sinclair (1911–2006). Thorson, along with his step-brother, Barney Kuchinka Jr. (1931–2016), his half brother, Darryl Kuchinka, and half sister, Ann Marie, were raised in Macoun by their mother and her second husband, Barney Kuchinka Sr. (1904–1991).

He completed Grade 12 at Macoun, and continued his education at the University of Saskatchewan, where he received a BSc in Agriculture. In 1960, he returned to the University of Saskatchewan, where he completed a Bachelor of Arts degree and a Bachelor of Law degree.

== Law career ==
Thorson became a Queen's Council in 1972. In 1975, he joined the Law Firm of Griffin and Bekke (later Griffin, Bekke and Thorson). In 1991, he left his practice in Regina to move to Weyburn, where he joined the Firm of Hardy and Thorson (later Thorson and Horner).

== Political career ==
After being elected to the Legislature in 1956 at the age of 24, Thorson became the youngest member of Tommy Douglas' Co-operative Commonwealth Federation government. Thorson was defeated by Liberal challenger Ian MacDougall when he ran for reelection in 1960. Following his defeat, Thorson returned to university to study law, then set up practice in Estevan.

Thorson returned to the provincial politics with the Saskatchewan New Democratic Party in a 1971 by-election held following the death of Russell Brown. Under Allen Blakeney, Thorson served in the provincial cabinet as Minister of Industry. He was defeated by Bob Larter when he ran for reelection in 1975 in the newly created constituency of Estevan.

== Personal life and death ==
Thorson later served as chairperson of the Weyburn and District Hospital Foundation. He retired on December 31, 2012.

He married Myrtle Lipsett (1933–2020) in 1957. They had three children, Eric Miles (born 1959), Janet Lynn (born 1960) and Vanessa Lee (born 1966).

Thorson died on January 7, 2026, at the age of 93.
