= Charles David Cuming =

Canadian politician

Charles David Cuming (April 7, 1900 – April 27, 1995) was a political figure in Saskatchewan. He represented Souris-Estevan from 1944 to 1948 in the Legislative Assembly of Saskatchewan as a Co-operative Commonwealth Federation (CCF) member.

He was born in Inchkeith, Saskatchewan and educated in Inchkeith, in Kipling and in Calgary, Alberta. Cuming was a director for the Saskatchewan section of the United Farmers of Canada and also served on the local school board. He was defeated when he ran for reelection to the provincial assembly in 1948. After leaving politics, Cuming served as sheriff for the Estevan district until he retired in 1965. He died in Regina at the age of 95.
