= CFSL =

Radio station in Saskatchewan, Canada

Coordinates: 49°27′57″N 103°50′35″W

- Weyburn, Saskatchewan; Canada
- Broadcast area: Southeastern Saskatchewan
- Frequency: 1190 kHz
- Branding: AM 1190

Programming
- Language: English
- Format: Classic hits
- Affiliations: Toronto Blue Jays Radio Network

Ownership
- Owner: Golden West Broadcasting
- Sister stations: CKRC-FM, CHWY-FM

History
- First air date: 1957
- Former frequencies: 1340 kHz
- Call sign meaning: Canada's Famous Soo Line

Technical information
- Class: B
- Power: 10 kW (daytime); 5 kW (nighttime)

Links
- Webcast: Listen Live
- Website: am1190radio.com

CFSL (1190 kHz is a Canadian radio station licensed to Weyburn, Saskatchewan. Owned by Golden West Broadcasting, it broadcasts a classic hits format serving the southeast portion of the province. The station shares studios with CKRC-FM and CHWY-FM at 305 Souris Avenue in downtown Weyburn.

== History ==
CFSL signed on in 1957 under the ownership of Soo Line Broadcasting Ltd., serving both Weyburn and Estevan (until the launch of its sister station CJSL in Estevan in 1961). Starting on 1340, the station moved to the current frequency at 1190 in the 1960s. When on 1340, CFSL was part of a study by the Federal Communications Commission in the United States, because a station in South Dakota, KIJV was looking to upgrade from 250 watts to 500 watts. The FCC found that KIJV would interfere with CFSL.

The station was listed as having deleted its allotment on 1340 in the 1960s which allowed KIJV to complete its upgrade. The station carried a country music format in the 1990s.

Soo Line Broadcasting, and both CJSL and CFSL would be acquired by Golden West Broadcasting in 1995. In 2006, CFSL would gain a sister FM station, CKRC-FM.

On November 15, 2023, both CFSL and CJSL flipped to classic hits, networking with all other Golden West AM stations in Saskatchewan. The country format moved to CHWY-FM.

== Programming ==
CFSL currently broadcasts a full service classic hits format. CFSL also carries Toronto Blue Jays baseball games.

The station is often reported by DXers in Finland.
