= CHWY =

CHWY may refer to:

- CHWY-FM, a radio station in Weyburn, Saskatchewan, Canada
- NYSE stock symbol for Chewy (company), a pet food retailer
