= Ian Hugh MacDougall =

Canadian politician

Ian Hugh MacDougall (May 29, 1928 – April 21, 2003) was an oil pipeline executive and political figure in Saskatchewan. He represented Souris-Estevan from 1960 to 1971 in the Legislative Assembly of Saskatchewan as a Liberal.

He was born in Edmonton, Alberta, the son of John A. MacDougall and Janet E. Cameron, and was educated in Bruderheim, Alberta and at St. Anthony's College in Edmonton. MacDougall was a supervisor for Producers Pipeline Ltd. He was married twice: first to Donna M. Weibe in 1956 and then to Bernice Drozda in 1964. MacDougall was an alderman for Estevan. He was defeated by Russell Brown when he ran for reelection to the Saskatchewan assembly in 1971 and then by Kim Thorson in a by-election held later that same year after Brown died in office. After leaving politics, he worked in the oil industry in the Estevan area until he retired in 1998.
