= The Old You =

The Old You may refer to:

- "The Old You", a song by 28 Days from Extremist Makeover
- "The Old You", a song by Laura Dawn from Believer
- "The Old You", a song by Silkworm from Italian Platinum
- "The Old You", a song by Vũ Cát Tường
- "The Old You", a song from the musical The Devil Wears Prada

== See also ==
- "I Miss the Old You", a song by Chris Henderson (Canadian musician)
- "Ode to the Old You", a song by Lido (musician)
