= James Forbes Creighton =

Canadian politician

James Forbes Creighton (November 2, 1879 – May 5, 1944) was a physician and political figure in Saskatchewan. He represented Estevan from 1925 to 1929 in the Legislative Assembly of Saskatchewan as an independent member.

He was born in Wingham, Ontario, the son of John Creighton and Agnes McCallum, and was educated in Alexander, Manitoba and at Manitoba University. In 1905, he married Agnes M. Cross. Creighton served in South Africa from 1899 to 1902 and was a member of an ambulance unit during World War I. He lived in Estevan, Saskatchewan. Creighton opened Estevan's first modern hospital in 1924.

Creighton Lodge nursing home in Estevan was named in his honour.
