= South East Cornerstone Public School Division =

School district in Saskatchewan, Canada

The South East Cornerstone South Public School Division No. 209 provides public education to approximately 8,100 students in south east Saskatchewan.

The School Division was created in April, 2005 as part of the Provincial Government's plan to restructure the way primary to secondary education was administered in the province. The first members of the Board of Education were elected on June 15, 2005. On January 1, 2006 it replaced the education administration of the former South Central #141, Sunrise #145, Weyburn #95, Weyburn Rural #62, Souris Moose Mountain #122, Moosomin #9 School Divisions and the Estevan Comprehensive School Board #127.

The School Division operates 41 schools with a wide variety of grade configurations and enrollments. It operates 165 school bus routes transporting over 3,000 students every school day. The division has a budget in excess of $72 million. The administrative office is located in Weyburn and a support office is in Estevan.
