= Cugnet Centre =

Arena in Saskatchewan

Coordinates: 49.6714°N 103.8602°W

The Cugnet Centre is a multi-purpose auditorium, arena, and community centre in Weyburn, Saskatchewan attached to the Weyburn Comprehensive School. The centre officially opened in 2014, and serves as a gymnasium with a stage and retractable seating. Kenney and Jo-Anne Cugnet, whose family have a history of investment and community involvement in the region, acquired naming rights to the facility in June 2012 for $1 million worth of shares in public companies. Until then, the facility was originally known as the Weyburn Triple-C Centre—representing its goals to be a "community, culture, and convention centre."
