= Chris Henderson (disambiguation) =

Chris Henderson (born 1970) is an American soccer player.

Chris or Christopher Henderson may also refer to:

- Chris Henderson (American musician), guitarist with 3 Doors Down
- Chris Henderson (Canadian musician) (born 1984), Canadian country musician
- C. J. Henderson (writer) (1951–2014), American writer
- C. J. Henderson (American football) (born 1998), American football cornerback
- Christopher Henderson (character), a minor character in the television series 24
- Christopher "Deep" Henderson, American music composer
- George Henderson (Australian politician) (Christopher George Henderson, 1857–1933)
