= CKRC =

CKRC may refer to:

- CKRC-FM, a radio station (103.5 FM) licensed to Weyburn, Saskatchewan, Canada
- CFWM-FM, a radio station (99.9 FM) licensed to Winnipeg, Manitoba, Canada, which held the call sign CKRC from 1943 to 1996
