= CHSN =

CHSN may refer to:

- CHSN-FM, a Canadian radio station
- Chicago Sports Network, an American regional sports network
