= CJSL =

Radio station in Estevan, Saskatchewan

Coordinates: 49°03′26″N 102°55′22″W

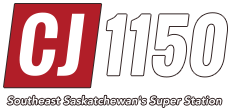
- Estevan, Saskatchewan; Canada
- Broadcast area: Southeastern Saskatchewan
- Frequency: 1150 kHz
- Branding: CJ 1150

Programming
- Format: Classic hits
- Affiliations: Toronto Blue Jays Radio Network

Ownership
- Owner: Golden West Broadcasting
- Sister stations: CHSN-FM, CKSE-FM

History
- First air date: August 1961
- Former frequencies: 1280 kHz (1961–2014)

Technical information
- Class: B
- Power: 10,000 watts

Links
- Webcast: Listen Live
- Website: discoverestevan.com/radio/cj1150

CJSL is a Canadian radio station licensed to Estevan, Saskatchewan, and serves the southeastern portion of the province. CJSL broadcasts a classic hits format.

The station is currently owned by Golden West Broadcasting, which also owns Estevan's two FM stations, CHSN-FM and CKSE-FM. Hockey games involving the senior Big 6 Hockey League are broadcast by the station in the winter, while in the summer the station carries Toronto Blue Jays baseball.

== History ==
CJSL began as a satellite station of Weyburn's CFSL after the Soo Line Broadcasting Company Ltd. applied to use the frequency of 1280 kHz. In August 1961, CJSL signed on the air with a power of 1,000 watts, effectively becoming Estevan's first radio station. The original studios were located at 1235 4th Street, Estevan, before moving to 5th Street in 1969.

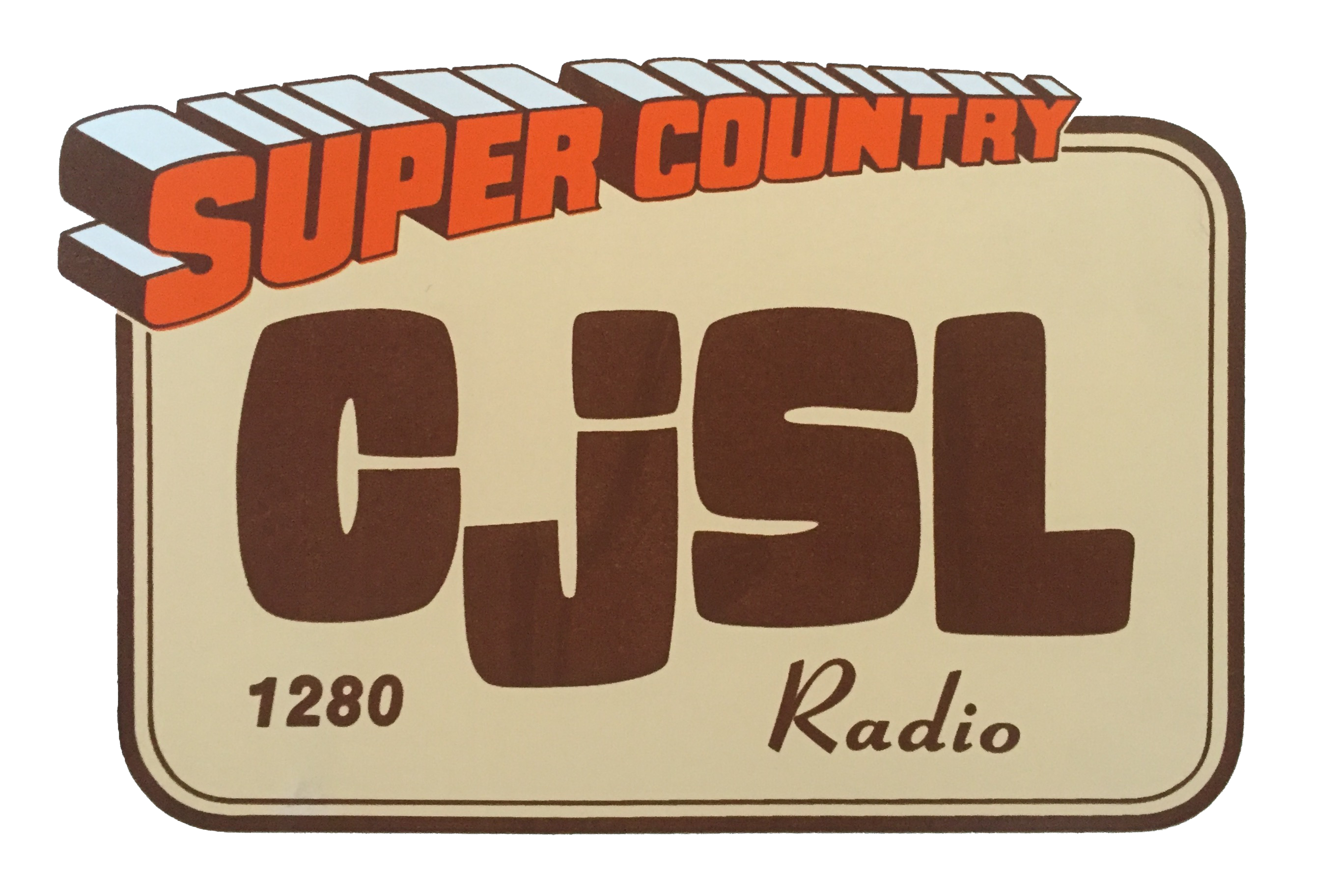
The logo used by CJSL in the 1980s and early 1990s, then known as "Super Country CJSL".

In 1977, CJSL applied to the CRTC to increase full-time power from 1,000 watts to 10,000 watts. The increase was approved in principle by the CRTC, but a final decision was delayed. The delay was caused by concerns from CJME Regina, who then operated at a frequency of 1300 kHz. The power increase was granted in 1978 after an agreement was reached with CJME.

In the 1980s, the station became known as Super Country CJSL.

In 1995, both CJSL and CFSL were sold to Frontier City Broadcasting Company, now known as Golden West Broadcasting. The station dropped the "Super Country" moniker and became known simply as CJ 1280, using the tagline "Today's best country, and your all time favourites".

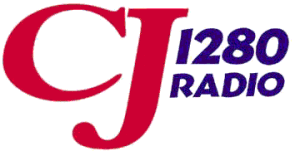
The logo used by CJSL between approximately 1995 and 2014.

On May 28, 2014, Golden West Broadcasting received CRTC approval to change CJSL's frequency to 1150 kHz, the frequency having been vacated when Brandon, Manitoba AM radio station CKX moved to FM. In November 2014, CJSL switched frequencies to its current frequency at 1150 kHz.

On November 15, 2023, CJSL flipped to classic hits, networking with all other Golden West AM stations in Saskatchewan. The country format moved to CKSE-FM.
