= John Edward McCormack =

Canadian politician

John Edward McCormack (July 6, 1917 – March 14, 1953) was a lawyer and political figure in Saskatchewan. He represented Souris-Estevan from 1948 to 1953 in the Legislative Assembly of Saskatchewan as a Liberal.

He was born in Estevan, Saskatchewan, the son of Albert McCormack and Bertha Rech, and was educated there and at the University of Saskatchewan. McCormack lived in Estevan. He served as a squadron leader in the Royal Canadian Air Force during World War II. McCormack died in office in Regina at the age of 35 as the result of an automobile accident.
