= CKSE-FM =

Radio station in Estevan, Saskatchewan

- Estevan, Saskatchewan; Canada
- Broadcast area: Estevan; Divide County, North Dakota; Burke County, North Dakota
- Frequency: 106.1 MHz
- Branding: Country 106.1

Programming
- Format: Country music
- Affiliations: Estevan Bruins

Ownership
- Owner: Golden West Broadcasting
- Sister stations: CHSN-FM, CJSL

History
- First air date: September 12, 2012

Technical information
- Facility ID: 9382
- Class: C1
- Power: 100,000 watts
- HAAT: 133.8 metres (439 ft)
- Transmitter coordinates: 49°3′25.92″N 102°55′22.8″W

Links
- Webcast: Listen Live
- Website: discoverestevan.com/country106

CKSE-FM (106.1 MHz) is a country music formatted broadcast radio station licensed to Estevan, Saskatchewan, Canada, serving Estevan and Divide and Burke counties in North Dakota. CKSE is owned and operated by Golden West Broadcasting. As of the 2016/2017 hockey season, the station is also now the official carrier of Estevan Bruins hockey broadcasts.

== History ==
The station received CRTC approval on January 25, 2011 and launched on September 12, 2012.

On November 15, 2023, CKSE-FM flipped to country music.
