= Estevan Motor Speedway =

Auto racing facility in Alberta, Canada

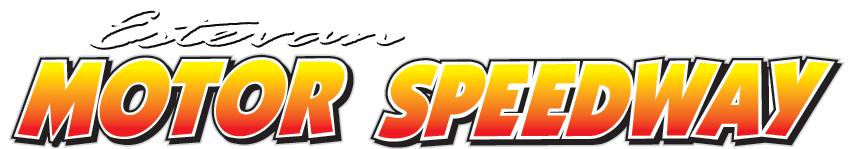
- Location: Estevan, Saskatchewan
- Coordinates: 49.1120°N 102.9205°W
- Capacity: 1,900
- Broke ground: 1999
- Opened: 2000

Oval
- Surface: Dirt
- Length: 0.37 mi (0.6 km)
- Banking: 25-30 degree

The Estevan Motor Speedway is a dirt race track located near Estevan, Saskatchewan which typically features several classes of stock car racing.

The Estevan Motor Speedway was built in 1999 after several local residents decided it was time to bring dirt track racing back to Saskatchewan's southeast, officially opening in 2000.

The track, a 3/8 mile high-bank oval, is located on land donated by the Luscar Coal Mine, a short distance from the Shand Power Station.

Estevan Motor Speedway is certified by the International Motor Contest Association (IMCA), the only track in Canada to receive that certification.

Regular races are typically held between May and August. The season concludes each September with an Enduro Race.

== Types of racing ==
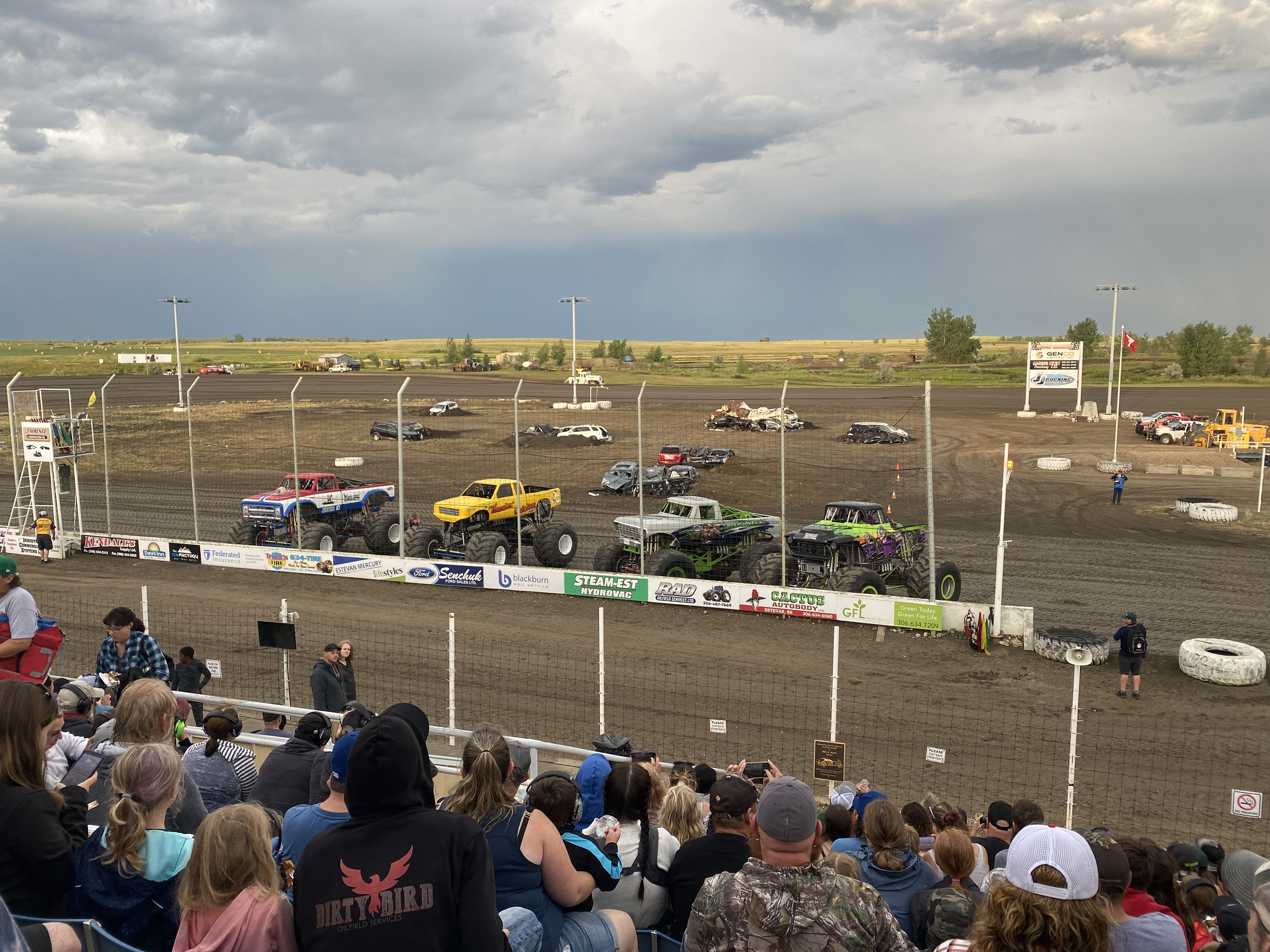
Monster trucks at Estevan Motor Speedway on July 30, 2022

A regular race night at Estevan Motor Speedway usually includes the following classes: Hobby Stocks, Sport Modifieds, Stocks, Modifieds, and Slingshots, a smaller version of other race classes meant to open the door to younger drivers.

Most regular drivers are from Saskatchewan, Manitoba or the nearby states of North Dakota and Montana.

The track also hosts specialty race events like large modified tours, late models, and monster truck shows.

In 2008, the track hosted a World of Outlaws late model race known as the Energy City 50.
