= Harvie James Dorrance =

Canadian politician

Harvie James Dorrance (July 15, 1898 – November 15, 1961) was a farmer and political figure in Saskatchewan. He represented Tisdale from 1934 to 1938 in the Legislative Assembly of Saskatchewan as a Liberal.

== Early life and education ==
He was born in Seaforth, Ontario, the son of James Dorrance and Ellen Hiller and was educated in McKillop township, Huron County. In 1921, Dorrance married Nina Kathleen Copeman. He served in the Canadian Expeditionary Force during World War I. He was defeated by John Hewgill Brockelbank when he ran for reelection to the assembly in 1938.
