= Souris-Estevan =

Former provincial electoral district in Saskatchewan, Canada

Coordinates: 49°17′N 103°00′W

Souris-Estevan is a former provincial electoral district for the Legislative Assembly of the province of Saskatchewan, Canada. This district was created for the 7th Saskatchewan general election in 1934 by combining the districts of Souris and Estevan.

The constituency was dissolved and divided between the districts of Estevan and Cannington (as "Souris-Cannington") before the 18th Saskatchewan general election in 1975.

== Members of the Legislative Assembly ==
#	MLA	Served	Party
1.	Jesse P. Tripp	1934–1938	Liberal
2.	Norman L. McLeod	1938–1944	Liberal
3.	Charles Cuming	1944–1948	CCF
4.	John McCormack	1948–1953	Liberal
5.	Robert Kohaly	Nov. 1953 – 1956	Progressive Conservative
6.	Kim Thorson	1956–1960	CCF
7.	Ian MacDougall	1960–1971	Liberal
8.	Russell Brown	Sept. – Nov. 1971	New Democrat
9.	Kim Thorson	Dec. 1971 – 1975	New Democrat

== Election results ==
1934 Saskatchewan general election: Souris-Estevan electoral district
Party	Candidate	Votes	%	±%
Liberal	Jesse P. Tripp	3,536	45.86%	–
Conservative	William Oliver Fraser	2,960	38.39%	–
Farmer-Labour	H. Gordon Gallaway	1,215	15.75%	–
Total		7,711	100.00%	

1938 Saskatchewan general election: Souris-Estevan electoral district
Party	Candidate	Votes	%	±%
Liberal	Norman L. McLeod	4,383	52.86%	+7.00
CCF	William Glenroy Allen	3,467	41.82%	+26.07
Social Credit	Ernest Wesley Hinkson	441	5.32%	–
Total		8,291	100.00%	

1944 Saskatchewan general election: Souris-Estevan electoral district
Party	Candidate	Votes	%	±%
CCF	Charles Cuming	3,933	50.09%	+8.27
Liberal	Norman L. McLeod	2,660	33.88%	-18.98
Prog. Conservative	Herbert S. Penny	1,259	16.03%	-
Total		7,852	100.00%	

1948 Saskatchewan general election: Souris-Estevan electoral district
Party	Candidate	Votes	%	±%
Liberal	John McCormack	4,924	48.84%	+14.96
CCF	Charles Cuming	4,741	47.02%	-3.07
Social Credit	John K. Strachan	417	4.14%	-
Total		10,082	100.00%	

1952 Saskatchewan general election: Souris-Estevan electoral district
Party	Candidate	Votes	%	±%
Liberal	John McCormack	5,221	50.76%	+1.92
CCF	E.J.B. Quist	5,064	49.24%	+2.22
Total		10,285	100.00%	

October 28, 1953 By-Election: Souris-Estevan electoral district
Party	Candidate	Votes	%	±%
Progressive Conservative	Robert Kohaly	5,285	57.43%	-
CCF	William Schieman	3,918	42.57%	-6.67
Total		9,203	100.00%	

1956 Saskatchewan general election: Souris-Estevan electoral district
Party	Candidate	Votes	%	±%
CCF	Kim Thorson	3,919	37.10%	-5.47
Liberal	James W. Cinnamon	3,318	31.42%	-
Prog. Conservative	Robert Kohaly	2,130	20.17%	-37.26
Social Credit	Clarence A. Gustafson	1,194	11.31%	-
Total		10,561	100.00%	

1960 Saskatchewan general election: Souris-Estevan electoral district
Party	Candidate	Votes	%	±%
Liberal	Ian MacDougall	4,965	44.43%	+13.01
CCF	Kim Thorson	3,935	35.21%	-1.89
Social Credit	James S. Reynolds	1,339	11.98%	+0.67
Prog. Conservative	E. Hudson	936	8.38%	-11.79
Total		11,175	100.00%	

1964 Saskatchewan general election: Souris-Estevan electoral district
Party	Candidate	Votes	%	±%
Liberal	Ian MacDougall	6,220	60.62%	+16.19
CCF	Ivar J. Kristianson	4,040	39.38%	+4.17
Total		10,260	100.00%	

1967 Saskatchewan general election: Souris-Estevan electoral district
Party	Candidate	Votes	%	±%
Liberal	Ian MacDougall	5,197	54.52%	-6.10
NDP	Russell Brown	4,335	45.48%	+6.10
Total		9,532	100.00%	

1971 Saskatchewan general election: Souris-Estevan electoral district
Party	Candidate	Votes	%	±%
NDP	Russell Brown	4,935	51.33%	+5.85
Liberal	Ian MacDougall	4,680	48.67%	-5.85
Total		9,615	100.00%	

December 1, 1971 By-Election: Souris-Estevan electoral district
Party	Candidate	Votes	%	±%
NDP	Kim Thorson	4,855	54.35%	+3.02
Liberal	Ian MacDougall	4,078	45.65%	-3.02
Total		8,933	100.00%	

== See also ==
- List of Saskatchewan provincial electoral districts
- List of Saskatchewan general elections
- Canadian provincial electoral districts
