= Russell Brown (Canadian politician) =

Canadian politician

Russell Brown (December 11, 1911 – October 19, 1971) was a political figure in Saskatchewan. He represented Last Mountain from 1952 to 1964 as a Co-operative Commonwealth Federation (CCF) member and Souris-Estevan in 1971 as a New Democratic Party (NDP) member in the Legislative Assembly of Saskatchewan.

He was born in Fort William, Ontario, the son of Ernest Albert Brown and Hetty McKeen, and was educated in Saskatchewan, in England and in the United States. From 1931 to 1940, he was a grain buyer for the Saskatchewan Wheat Pool. In 1933, he married Edith May Cummings; he later married his second wife Lorie following Edith's death. Brown served in the Canadian Army during World War II. From 1946 to 1949, he was an auditor for the Saskatchewan Department of Co-operation and Co-operative Development. In 1949, he was hired as a field representative based in Regina for the Saskatchewan Wheat Pool. In the following year, Brown became general secretary for the Saskatchewan CCF.

He served in the provincial cabinet as Provincial Secretary, as Minister of Travel and Information, as Minister of Industry and Information and as Minister Responsible for the Saskatchewan Power Corporation. Brown was defeated by Donald Gilbert MacLennan when he ran for reelection to the provincial assembly in 1964. He then served as Director of Organization for the federal New Democratic Party. Brown resigned in 1965, moving to Estevan. He operated several businesses there and also served on city council.

He was defeated by Ian Hugh MacDougall when he ran for the Souris-Estevan seat in the assembly in 1967 but subsequently defeated MacDougall in 1971. Brown died in office in Regina later that year at the age of 59.
