= John Brockelbank =

John Brockelbank may refer to:

- John Edward Brockelbank (1931–2020), Canadian politician, son of John Hewgill Brockelbank
- John Hewgill Brockelbank (1897–1977), Canadian politician, father of John Edward Brockelbank
