= Kal Hourd =

Canadian country music singer-songwriter

- Origin: Saskatoon, Saskatchewan, Canada
- Genres: Country
- Occupation: Singer
- Years active: 2007–present
- Labels: E1

Kal Hourd (pronounced Hurd, born May 9) is a Canadian country music singer-songwriter. Hourd's debut album, Haven't Even Met Yet, was released in August 2009 by E1 Entertainment.

== Career ==
Hourd grew up in Stockholm, Saskatchewan. He took up music when he was young as, unlike many of his friends, he was not athletic. He was encouraged to perform by Brad Johner, whom he met and jammed with in 2001, and so he started entering talent quests. He began writing songs for his first album in 2006. In 2007, he won a rising star award at the 2007 Saskatchewan Country Music Association (SCMA) Awards.

He released his debut album Haven't Even Met Yet in August 2009. It featured 12 songs, eight of which Hourd had co-written. Prior to the release of the album, Canadian astronaut Julie Payette asked for a copy of Haven't Even Met Yet to take with her on a mission to the International Space Station, on the Space Shuttle Endeavour. The same year, 2009, Hourd's single Beautiful Sound, co-written by Missouri songwriter Deanna Harper, reached No 50 on the Canadian Country chart, his song When Pink Is Just a Color Again was chosen as the Pink Ribbon International official song, and he won Video of the Year for When Pink Is Just a Color Again at the SCMA awards. At the 2010 SCMA Awards, Hourd received awards for album of the year for Haven't Even Met Yet, as well as single of the year and song of the year for Beautiful Sound. In 2012, When Pink Is Just a Color Again won him a second SCMA song of the year award. In 2016, he co-wrote the song Covered In Dust with Darlene Tuleta, who recorded the single and video. Hourd was also leader of The Kal Hourd Band.

== Discography ==
=== Albums ===
Title	Details
Haven't Even Met Yet	Release date: August 11, 2009; Label: E1 Entertainment

=== Singles ===
Year	Single	Peak positions	Album
Year	Single	CAN Country	Album
2009	"Beautiful Sound"	50	Haven't Even Met Yet
2010	"Haven't Even Met Yet"	—	Haven't Even Met Yet
2010	"Always Better"	—	Haven't Even Met Yet
2011	"When Pink Is Just a Color Again"	—	Haven't Even Met Yet
