= Estevan (former electoral district) =

Former provincial electoral district in Saskatchewan, Canada

Coordinates: 49°09′30″N 102°59′30″W

Estevan is a former provincial electoral district for the Legislative Assembly of the province of Saskatchewan, Canada. This district was created for the 2nd Saskatchewan general election in 1908. Renamed "Bromhead" in 1934, the constituency was dissolved and combined with the Souris-Estevan district before the 9th Saskatchewan general election in 1938.

It is now part of the provincial constituencies of Estevan and Weyburn-Big Muddy.

== Members of the Legislative Assembly ==
#	MLA	Served	Party
1.	George Alexander Bell	1908–1918	Liberal
2.	Robert Dunbar	November 1918 – 1925	Liberal
3.	James Forbes Creighton	1925–1929	Independent
4.	Eleazer William Garner	1929–1930	Liberal
5.	David McKnight	January 1931	Conservative
6.	Norman L. McLeod	Feb. 1931 – November 1932	Liberal
7.	vacant	7 November 1932 – 1934	
8.	Norman L. McLeod	1934–1938	Liberal

== Election results ==
1908 Saskatchewan general election: Estevan electoral district
Party	Candidate	Votes	%	±%
Liberal	George Alexander Bell	828	61.15%	–
Provincial Rights	Henry Yardley	526	38.85%	–
Total		1,354	100.00%	

1912 Saskatchewan general election: Estevan electoral district
Party	Candidate	Votes	%	±%
Liberal	George Alexander Bell	1,087	65.76%	+4.61
Conservative	Henry Yardley	566	34.24%	-4.61
Total		1,653	100.00%	

September 5, 1912 By-Election: Estevan electoral district
Party	Candidate	Votes	%	±%
Liberal	George Alexander Bell	Acclaimed	100.00%	
Total		Acclamation		

1917 Saskatchewan general election: Estevan electoral district
Party	Candidate	Votes	%	±%
Liberal	George Alexander Bell	1,903	60.11%	-
Conservative	James Hill	1,263	39.89%	-
Total		3,166	100.00%	

October 24, 1918 By-Election: Estevan electoral district
Party	Candidate	Votes	%	±%
Liberal	Robert Dunbar	1,220	63.98%	+3.87
Independent	Thomas Miller Bryce	687	36.02%	–
Total		1,907	100.00%	

1921 Saskatchewan general election: Estevan electoral district
Party	Candidate	Votes	%	±%
Liberal	Robert Dunbar	Acclaimed	100.00%	
Total		Acclamation		

1925 Saskatchewan general election: Estevan electoral district
Party	Candidate	Votes	%	±%
Independent	James Forbes Creighton	2,153	55.91%	-
Liberal	Robert Dunbar	1,698	44.09%	-
Total		3,851	100.00%	

1929 Saskatchewan general election: Estevan electoral district
Party	Candidate	Votes	%	±%
Liberal	Eleazer William Garner	2,423	51.94%	+7.85
Conservative	David McKnight	1,691	36.25%	-
Progressive	H. Gordon Gallaway	551	11.81%	–
Total		4,665	100.00%	

December 23, 1930 By-Election: Estevan electoral district
Party	Candidate	Votes	%	±%
Conservative	David McKnight	2,700	50.13%	+13.88
Liberal	Norman L. McLeod	2,686	49.87%	-2.07
Total		5,386	100.00%	

1934 Saskatchewan general election: Bromhead electoral district
Party	Candidate	Votes	%	±%
Liberal	Norman L. McLeod	2,416	51.02%	+1.15
Farmer-Labour	Eric Oxelgren	1,208	25.51%	-
Conservative	Frances B. Smyth	1,111	23.47%	-26.66
Total		4,735	100.00%	

== See also ==
- List of Saskatchewan provincial electoral districts
- List of Saskatchewan general elections
- Canadian provincial electoral districts
