= Tisdale (provincial electoral district) =

Former provincial electoral district in Saskatchewan, Canada

Coordinates: 52°55′N 103°20′W

Tisdale was a provincial electoral district for the Legislative Assembly of the province of Saskatchewan, Canada, centred on the town of Tisdale, Saskatchewan. Created before the 4th Saskatchewan general election in 1917, this riding was dissolved and combined with the Melfort district (as Melfort-Tisdale) before the 12th Saskatchewan general election in 1952.

It is now part of the constituencies of Melfort and Carrot River Valley. Another provincial electoral district in the same area called "Kelsey-Tisdale" existed from 1975 to 1995.

== Members of the Legislative Assembly ==
#	MLA	Served	Party
1.	Hugh Evan Jones	1917 – 1925	Liberal
2.	Walter C. Buckle	1925 – 1934	Conservative
3.	Harvie Dorrance	1934 – 1938	Liberal
4.	John Hewgill Brockelbank	1938 – 1952	CCF

== Election results ==
1917 Saskatchewan general election: Tisdale electoral district
Party	Candidate	Votes	%	±%
Liberal	Hugh Evan Jones	530	54.08%	–
Conservative	Robert McLean	450	45.92%	–
Total		980	100.00%	

1921 Saskatchewan general election: Tisdale electoral district
Party	Candidate	Votes	%	±%
Liberal	Hugh Evan Jones	1,314	54.25%	+0.17
Independent	James Hugh McPhail	1,108	45.75%	–
Total		2,422	100.00%	

1925 Saskatchewan general election: Tisdale electoral district
Party	Candidate	Votes	%	±%
Conservative	Walter C. Buckle	1,349	48.09%	-
Liberal	Hugh Evan Jones	1,266	45.14%	-9.11
Progressive	John T. Seekins	190	6.77%	–
Total		2,805	100.00%	

1929 Saskatchewan general election: Tisdale electoral district
Party	Candidate	Votes	%	±%
Conservative	Walter C. Buckle	2,939	60.18%	+12.09
Liberal	Moot Fritshaw	1,945	39.82%	-5.32
Total		4,884	100.00%	

October 7, 1929 By-Election: Tisdale electoral district
Party	Candidate	Votes	%	±%
Conservative	Walter C. Buckle	Acclaimed	100.00%	
Total		Acclamation		

1934 Saskatchewan general election: Tisdale electoral district
Party	Candidate	Votes	%	±%
Liberal	Harvie Dorrance	3,425	41.92%	-
Conservative	Walter C. Buckle	2,407	29.46%	-
Farmer-Labour	Jay B. Ennis	2,338	28.62%	-
Total		8,170	100.00%	

1938 Saskatchewan general election: Tisdale electoral district
Party	Candidate	Votes	%	±%
CCF	John H. Brockelbank	4,202	44.74%	+16.12
Liberal	Harvie Dorrance	3,421	36.43%	-5.49
Social Credit	Robert M. Locker	1,115	11.87%	–
Conservative	Garth F. Johnston	654	6.96%	-22.50
Total		9,392	100.00%	

1944 Saskatchewan general election: Tisdale electoral district
Party	Candidate	Votes	%	±%
CCF	John H. Brockelbank	5,283	64.00%	+19.26
Liberal	Clarence R. O'Connor	2,269	27.49%	-8.94
Prog. Conservative	Isaac F. Stothers	703	8.51%	+1.55
Total		8,255	100.00%	

1948 Saskatchewan general election: Tisdale electoral district
Party	Candidate	Votes	%	±%
CCF	John H. Brockelbank	5,242	50.44%	-13.56
Liberal	Donald L.W. Hood	3,980	38.29%	+10.80
Prog. Conservative	William L. Hayes	1,171	11.27%	+2.76
Total		10,393	100.00%	

== See also ==
- List of Saskatchewan provincial electoral districts
- List of Saskatchewan general elections
- Canadian provincial electoral districts
