= Eleazer Garner =

Canadian politician

Eleazer William Garner (April 28, 1887 – October 27, 1937) was a real estate and insurance agent, lawyer, farmer and political figure in Saskatchewan. He represented Estevan from 1929 to 1930 in the Legislative Assembly of Saskatchewan as a Liberal.

He was born in Walkerton, Ontario, the son of Eleazer William Garner and Lucinda Jane Brown, and was educated there. In 1908, he came to Saskatchewan, settling in Regina. Garner worked in the collection department of the International Harvester Company in Regina from 1911 to 1913. He came to Estevan in 1915. In 1916, he married Esther Gray. Garner was called to the Saskatchewan bar in 1918. He served on the city council for Estevan and was mayor from 1921 to 1923. Garner was also secretary and manager of the Estevan Agricultural Society from 1917 to 1923 and was manager of the Truax-Traer coal mine. He resigned his seat in the provincial legislature in 1930.
