= Chris Henderson (Canadian musician) =

Canadian country musician (born 1984)

- Born: Christopher Terry Henderson; April 7, 1984 (age 42); Estevan, Saskatchewan, Canada
- Genre: Country
- Occupations: Musician, songwriter
- Instruments: Vocals, guitar
- Years active: 2006–present
- Label: N/A
- Website: www.chrishendersonmusic.com

Chris Henderson (born April 7, 1984) is a Canadian country musician born in Estevan, Saskatchewan and currently based out of Regina, Saskatchewan.

== 620 CKRM Contest ==
In 2006, Chris entered, and won, the 620 CKRM Big Country Talent Show, which essentially launched his career as a recording artist, whether he knew it at the time or not.

As prize for winning the contest, Chris was awarded the opportunity to record a single with SCMA and CCMA award-winning Saskatchewan band, the Poverty Plainsmen. Working with the band, Chris released the single "The Difference You Make" in October of the same year. The single became a tune frequently played on CKRM and its success encouraged Chris to pursue other recording opportunities.

Other notable winners of the CKRM contest include Brad Johner, Kal Hourd, Jess Moskaluke, Katie Hess, and Sheila Deck.

== Follow the Signs ==
In September 2007, Chris travelled to Nashville to record his first full-length album, Follow the Signs. Initial recording on the album was completed at Grand & Gee Music and subsequent recording was done at B-Rad Studios in Regina.

The album's first single, "You Don't Scare Me" was released in September 2008 and as of October, it has reached No. 87 on the CanCon Country Music Charts. It is being played on radio stations nationwide. Other singles that were from this album include: "All Of Me" and "The Cover of Country Weekly".

== It Isn't Christmas Without Snow ==
Henderson released a self-penned Christmas song in 2010, which was recorded in Regina, Sk at B-Rad Studios with Brad Prosko producing, engineering, and mixing. The song featured Jayson Brinkworth on drums, Dave Chobot on bass and keys, and Brad Prosko on acoustic and electric guitar.

== "The Next Big Thing" ==
In 2010, Henderson entered a contest sponsored by CHBD-FM (Big Dog 92.7), a radio station in Regina, Sk which has since been rebranded to Pure Country. The prize was for $15,000, which included a showcase at the Canadian Country Music Awards in Edmonton, Alberta that year, and much more.

Henderson was crowned the winner of the contest, and took the opportunity to head back into the studio to begin work on a sophomore album. His music career started to get busy enough that he resigned from his previous career as a high school English Language Arts teacher in 2011.

== My Turn ==
After slowly working away at a new album, Henderson returned to the studio to finish "My Turn" in 2013, and released it the following year. "Don't Miss Your Kiss Goodbye" was released as the lead single, and reached #47 on the Canadian BDS charts, making it the top wholly independent song on the charts at the time. The song also won the 2014 Saskatchewan Country Music Award for "Song of the Year" awarded to the writers including Henderson, Troy Kokol, and Willie Mack.

The follow-up single "I Sure Hope He Loves You" reached #51 on the BDS Charts as well, and Henderson was nominated for 5 SCMA awards that year.

== The Charm ==
The Charm was Henderson's 3rd full-length album, and was released in 2017. The lead single, "My Regret" reached #47 on the Canadian Country Mediabase chart, and remained in that position for four weeks.

The follow-up single, "Kissing Sadie" reached #75 on the charts in Canada, and was also nominated for an Alberta Country Music award for "Songwriter(s) of the Year". It was eligible because Henderson's co-writers, Joni DeLaurier and Mike Little, both reside in Alberta.

== Point of View ==
Point of View is Henderson's 4th studio project, and was released on October 4, 2019. The album's lead single, "I'll Be Your Mountain" was released in January 2019, and reached at peak of #72 on the Canadian charts.

To celebrate the project's release, Henderson performed at The Artesian in Regina, Saskatchewan, on the evening of October 4; Poor Nameless Boy, Kevin Knopf, and JJ Voss were supporting acts.

== Discography ==
- The Difference You Make (2006) – single release
- Follow the Signs (2008)
  1. "The Cover of Country Weekly" – 3:29 (by Sean Hogan & Jerry Holthouse)
  2. "You Don't Scare Me" – 3:16 (by Steve Fox)
  3. "Follow the Signs" – 4:16 (by Chris Henderson and Jocelyn Armbruster)
  4. "All of Me" – 3:09 (by Anthony Kelly & Arranged by Chris Henderson)
  5. "The Difference You Make" – 3:55 (by Cyril Rawson, Ritchie McDonald, & Ron Harbin)
  6. "You Can't Cry Your Way Out of This" – 3:09 (by Sean Hogan & Jerry Holthouse)
  7. "I Miss The Old You" – 3:06 (by Cory Churko, Kevin Churko, Michael Norman & Shane Hendrickson)
  8. "Believe" – 4:08 (by Chris Henderson)
  9. "The Trouble With Love" – 3:21 (by Cyril Rawson, Tebey Ottoh & Carl Utbult)
  10. "All I Know is What I Heard" – 3:58 (by Cyril Rawson, Glen Coulson, Marty Beecroft & Joe Heslip)
  11. "Sad And Sorry Man" – 5:36 (by Sean Hogan)
- It Isn't Christmas Without Snow (2010) – single release
- My Turn (2014)
  1. "Don't Miss Your Kiss Goodbye" – 4:07 (written by Chris Henderson, Troy Kokol, and Willie Mack)
  2. "(Thanks For Making Me) Look So Good" – 2:56 (written by Chris Henderson)
  3. "Crazy's Comin' Outta the Bottle" – 3:00 (written by Chris Henderson)
  4. "I Sure Hope He Loves You" - 3:33 (written by Chris Henderson)
  5. "Have a Little Faith in Me" - 3:41 (written by John Hiatt)
  6. "Dance or 3" - 2:31 (written by Chris Henderson and Joel Henderson)
  7. "The List of What I'll Miss" - 3:29 (written by Chris Henderson)
  8. "Murphy's Law" - 3:59 (written by Chris Henderson)
  9. "Taking Sides (feat. Donn Henderson" - 3:51 (written by Chris Henderson and Tim Taylor)
  10. "Have a Little Faith in Me (Live)" - 3:28 *featuring the Winston Knoll Collegiate Sr. Choir*
- The Charm (2017)
  1. "My Regret" – 3:20 (written by Chris Henderson and Troy Kokol)
  2. "Kissing Sadie" – 2:54 (written by Chris Henderson, Joni DeLaurier, and Mike Little)
  3. "Til It's Just A Memory" – 3:33 (written by Chris Henderson and Steve Mitchell)
  4. "Stranger With Memories" - 3:24 (written by Chris Henderson and Chris Yurchuck)
  5. "Failing Forward" - 3:18 (written by Chris Henderson and Daryl Burgess)
  6. "Craves the Chaos" - 3:21 (written by Chris Henderson and Adam Wheeler)
  7. "Saw it in the Mirror" - 3:51 (written by Chris Henderson and Russell Broom)
  8. "My Regret" (alternate version)- 3:14
  9. "Til It's Just A Memory" (piano version)- 3:42
  10. "Have a Little Faith in Me (Live)" - 3:28
- Point of View (2019)
  1. "I'll Be Your Mountain"- 2:54 (written by Chris Henderson and Steve Mitchell)
  2. "Bad Memory"- 3:38 (written by Chris Henderson and Troy Kokol)
  3. "Mama Raised A Quitter"- 2:51 (written by Chris Henderson)
  4. "Point of View"- 3:49 (written by Chris Henderson and Steve Mitchell)
  5. "Didn't Want My Sweater Back"- 2:49 (written by Chris Henderson)
  6. "Next To Me"- 3:09 (written by Chris Henderson, Chris Yurchuk, and Don Schmedding)
  7. "Time Machine" (Bonus Acoustic Track)- 3:46 (written by Chris Henderson)
