= Walter Clutterbuck Buckle =

Canadian politician

Walter Clutterbuck Buckle (June 28, 1881 – August 25, 1955) was an English-born political figure in Saskatchewan. He represented Tisdale in the Legislative Assembly of Saskatchewan from 1925 to 1934 as a Conservative.

He was born in Gloucester and was educated at Sir Thomas Rich's School and Brentford College. In 1905, Buckle came to Canada, and around 1910, settled near Tisdale, where he established a farm implement business. He served as mayor of Tisdale from 1921 to 1925. Buckle served in the provincial cabinet as Minister of Agriculture. He was defeated when he ran for re-election to the provincial assembly in 1934. Buckle retired from business in 1946 and moved to Victoria, British Columbia. He died there in 1955.
