= CKRC-FM =

Radio station in Weyburn, Saskatchewan

Coordinates: 49°27′57″N 103°50′35″W

- Weyburn, Saskatchewan; Canada
- Broadcast area: Southeast Saskatchewan
- Frequency: 103.5 MHz
- Branding: Magic 103

Programming
- Language: English
- Format: Hot adult contemporary

Ownership
- Owner: Golden West Broadcasting
- Sister stations: CFSL, CHWY-FM

History
- First air date: September 19, 2006

Technical information
- Class: C1
- ERP: 43,000 watts (vertical); 100,000 watts (horizontal)
- HAAT: 75.3 metres (247 ft)

Links
- Webcast: Listen Live
- Website: discoverweyburn.com/magic103

CKRC-FM is a radio station in Weyburn, Saskatchewan, Canada that operates at 103.5 FM. CKRC broadcasts a hot adult contemporary format branded as Magic 103.

Owned by Golden West Broadcasting, it shares studios with CFSL and CHWY-FM at 305 Souris Avenue in downtown Weyburn.

On April 24, 2006, the Canadian Radio-television and Telecommunications Commission (CRTC) approved Golden West's application to operate a new FM station at 103.5 MHz in Weyburn. CKRC first signed on at 7:00 AM, September 19, 2006. The station's original format was classic hits, but later flipped to hot AC.
