= Inchkeith, Saskatchewan =

Community in Saskatchewan, Canada

Coordinates: 50°04′36″N 102°27′40″W

Location of Inchkeith in Saskatchewan

Inchkeith is a community in the Canadian province of Saskatchewan.
