= CHWY-FM =

Radio station in Saskatchewan, Canada

Coordinates: 49°27′57″N 103°50′35″W

- Weyburn, Saskatchewan; Canada
- Broadcast area: Southeast Saskatchewan
- Frequency: 106.7 MHz
- Branding: Country 106.7

Programming
- Format: Country
- Affiliations: Weyburn Red Wings

Ownership
- Owner: Golden West Broadcasting
- Sister stations: CFSL, CKRC-FM

History
- First air date: December 10, 2013
- Call sign meaning: WY for Weyburn

Technical information
- Class: C1
- ERP: 43,000 watts (vertical); 100,000 watts (horizontal)
- HAAT: 75.3 metres (247 ft)

Links
- Website: discoverweyburn.com/country106

CHWY-FM is a radio station in Weyburn, Saskatchewan. Broadcasting on 106.7 FM, the station is owned by Golden West Broadcasting, which received approval from the CRTC on February 17, 2012. It shares studios with Golden West's other Weyburn stations at 305 Souris Avenue in downtown Weyburn.

== History ==
The station began test broadcasts in November 2013, and officially launched on December 10 of the same year with a mainstream rock format branded as K106.

On October 17, 2018, CHWY flipped to an adult hits format as Big 106.

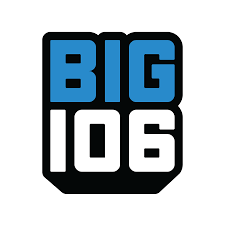
Logo used as Big 106 from 2018 - 2023

On November 15, 2023, CHWY flipped to country music as Country 106.7.
