= CHSN-FM =

Radio station in Estevan, Saskatchewan

Coordinates: 49°03′26″N 102°55′22″W

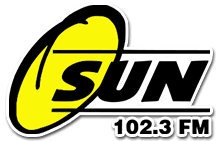
- Estevan, Saskatchewan; Canada
- Frequency: 102.3 MHz
- Branding: Sun 102

Programming
- Format: hot adult contemporary

Ownership
- Owner: Golden West Broadcasting

History
- First air date: November 2001

Technical information
- Class: C1
- ERP: 43 kWs vertical 100 kWs horizontal
- HAAT: 70.8 metres (232 ft)

Links
- Website: discoverestevan.com/radio/sun102

CHSN-FM is a Canadian radio station broadcasting at 102.3 FM in Estevan, Saskatchewan. The station is currently owned & operated by Golden West Broadcasting and plays a hot adult contemporary format under the brand name Sun 102.

== History ==
Golden West received approval from the CRTC on April 26, 2001, and the station was launched in November of the same year. CHSN was the first sister station to CJSL. At launch, the station had an adult contemporary format.

CHSN's format, branding and call sign were all adopted from a radio station in Saskatoon whose owner, Rawlco Communications, dropped them to launch a new active rock station, CJDJ.

In 2012, following the launch of CKSE-FM, CHSN switched to a hot adult contemporary format, with a much heavier emphasis on Top 40 pop. The station currently uses the slogans "Today's Best Music" and "Estevan's Best Music".
