= Weyburn =

City in Saskatchewan, Canada

- City
- City of Weyburn
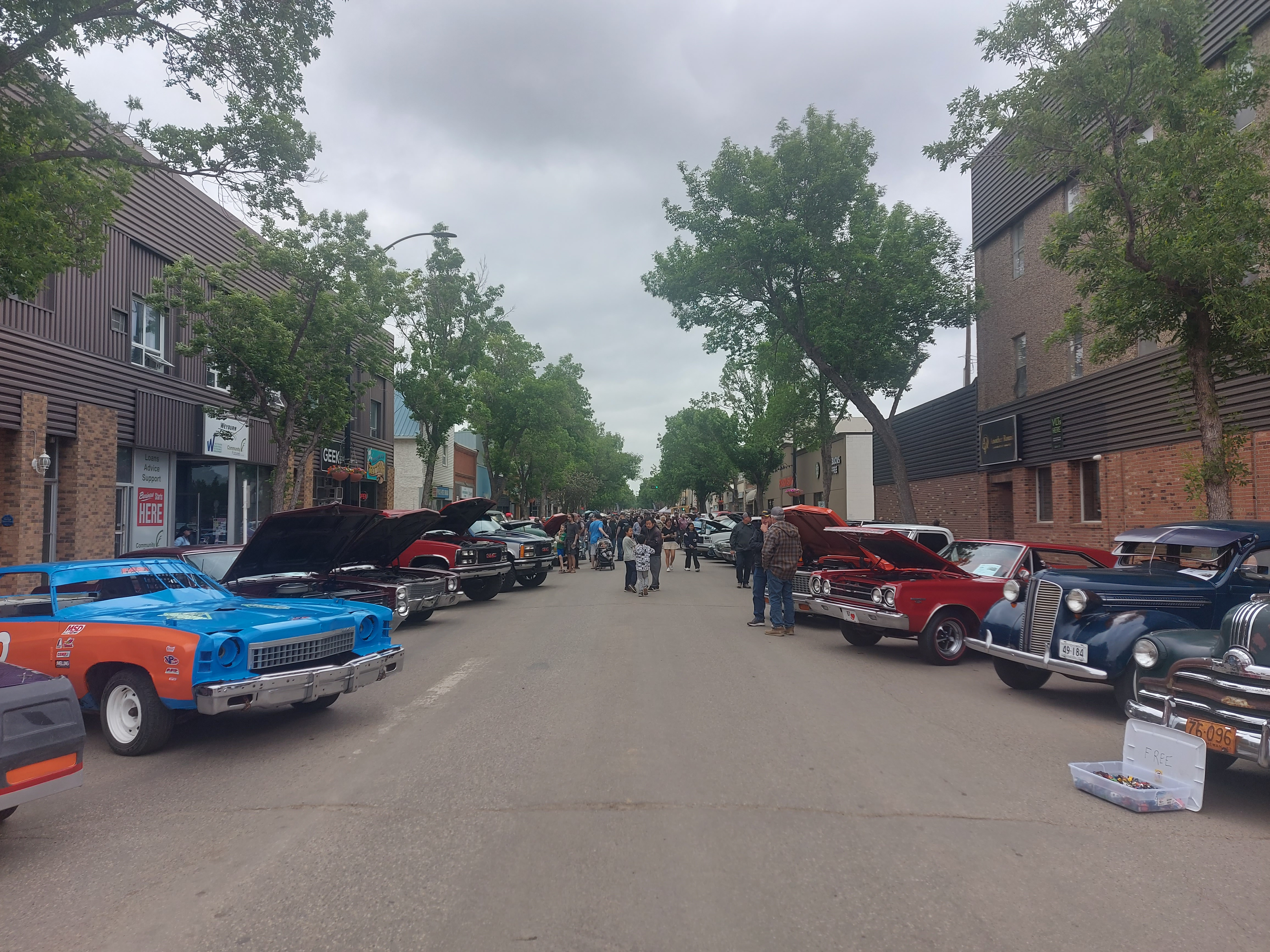
- Show and Shine Car show on 3rd Street (Main Street)

- Flag
- Nickname: The Opportunity City
- Motto: "Vision, Achievement, Progress"
- Location within Saskatchewan Location within Canada
- Coordinates: 49°39′40″N 103°51′09″W
- Country: Canada
- Province: Saskatchewan
- Census division: 2

Government
  - Mayor: Jeff Richards
  - Governing Body: Weyburn City Council
  - MP Souris—Moose Mountain: Robert Kitchen (CPC)
  - MLA Weyburn-Bengough: Michael Weger (SP)

Area (2021)
  - Total: 19.03 km^{2} (7.35 sq mi)
- Elevation: 561 m (1,841 ft)

Population (2021)
  - Total: 11,019
  - Density: 579/km^{2} (1,500/sq mi)
- Forward sortation area: S4H
- Website: City of Weyburn

Weyburn is the tenth-largest city in Saskatchewan, Canada. The city had a population of 11,019 in 2021. It is on the Souris River 110 kilometres (68 mi) southeast of the provincial capital, Regina, and is 70 km (43 mi) north from the Canada–United States border adjoining North Dakota. The name "Weyburn" is reputedly a corruption of the Scottish "wee burn", referring to a small creek. The city is surrounded by the Rural Municipality of Weyburn No. 67.

== History ==
The Canadian Pacific Railway (CPR) reached the future site of Weyburn from Brandon, Manitoba in 1892 and the Soo Line from North Portal on the US border in 1893. A post office opened in 1895 and a land office in 1899 in anticipation of the land rush which soon ensued. In 1899, Knox Presbyterian Church was founded with its building constructed in 1906 in the high-pitched gable roof and arches, standing as a testimony to the faith and optimism in the Weyburn area. Weyburn was legally constituted a village in 1900, a town in 1903 and finally as a city in 1913. From 1910 until 1931 the Weyburn Security Bank was headquartered in the city.

Weyburn had since become an important railroad town in Saskatchewan – the Pasqua branch of the Souris, Arcola, Weyburn, Regina CPR branch; Portal Section of the CPR / Soo Line; Moose Jaw, Weyburn, Shaunavon, Lethbridge CPR section; the Brandon, Marfield, Carlyle, Lampman, Radville, Willow Bunch section of the Canadian National Railway (CNR); and the Regina, Weyburn, Radville, Estevan, Northgate CNR section have all run through Weyburn.

Weyburn was previously home to the Souris Valley Mental Health Hospital, which was closed as a health care facility and sold in 2006, and demolished in 2009. When the mental hospital opened in 1921, it was the largest building in the British Commonwealth and was considered to be on the cutting edge of experimental treatments for people with mental disabilities. The facility had a reputation of leading the way in therapeutic programming. At its peak, the facility was home to approximately 2,500 patients. The history of the facility is explored in the documentary Weyburn: An Archaeology of Madness.

== Demographics ==
Historical populations
Year	Pop.	±%
1901	113	—
1911	2,210	+1855.8%
1921	3,193	+44.5%
1931	5,002	+56.7%
1941	6,119	+22.3%
1951	7,148	+16.8%
1961	9,101	+27.3%
1971	8,815	−3.1%
1981	9,523	+8.0%
1991	9,673	+1.6%
2001	9,534	−1.4%
2006	9,433	−1.1%
2011	10,484	+11.1%
2016	10,870	+3.7%
2021	11,019	+1.4%
Source: Statistics Canada

In the 2021 Canadian census conducted by Statistics Canada, Weyburn had a population of 11,019 living in 4,655 of its 5,142 total private dwellings, a change of 1.4% from its 2016 population of 10,870. With a land area of 19.03 km^{2} (7.35 sq mi), it had a population density of 579.0/km^{2} (1,499.7/sq mi) in 2021.

Canada census – Weyburn community profile

	2011
Population	10,484 (11.1% from 2006)
Land area	18.49 km^{2} (7.14 sq mi)
Population density	566.9/km^{2} (1,468/sq mi)
Median age
Private dwellings	4,645 (total)
Median household income

References: 2011

=== Ethnicity ===
Panethnic groups in the City of Weyburn (2001−2021)
Panethnic group	2021		2016		2011		2006		2001	
Panethnic group	Pop.	%	Pop.	%	Pop.	%	Pop.	%	Pop.	%
European (Note: Statistic includes all persons that did not make up part of a visible minority or an indigenous identity.)	8,735	82.44%	9,185	86.98%	9,355	92.12%	8,635	94.99%	8,770	95.74%
Southeast Asian (Note: Statistic includes total responses of "Filipino" and "Southeast Asian" under visible minority section on census.)	620	5.85%	420	3.98%	225	2.22%	25	0.28%	35	0.38%
Indigenous	425	4.01%	375	3.55%	310	3.05%	285	3.14%	235	2.57%
South Asian	425	4.01%	305	2.89%	115	1.13%	0	0%	10	0.11%
African	180	1.7%	135	1.28%	45	0.44%	80	0.88%	25	0.27%
East Asian (Note: Statistic includes total responses of "Chinese", "Korean", and "Japanese" under visible minority section on census.)	110	1.04%	40	0.38%	60	0.59%	65	0.72%	55	0.6%
Middle Eastern (Note: Statistic includes total responses of "West Asian" and "Arab" under visible minority section on census.)	35	0.33%	45	0.43%	0	0%	10	0.11%	0	0%
Latin American	30	0.28%	25	0.24%	0	0%	0	0%	30	0.33%
Other/multiracial (Note: Statistic includes total responses of "Visible minority, n.i.e." and "Multiple visible minorities" under visible minority section on census.)	25	0.24%	40	0.38%	15	0.15%	0	0%	15	0.16%
Total responses	10,595	96.15%	10,560	97.15%	10,155	96.86%	9,090	96.36%	9,160	96.08%
Total population	11,019	100%	10,870	100%	10,484	100%	9,433	100%	9,534	100%
Note: Totals greater than 100% due to multiple origin responses

== Geography and climate ==
Weyburn is situated near the upper delta of the 700 km (430 mi) long Souris River. The Souris River continues southeast through North Dakota eventually meeting the Assiniboine River in Manitoba. In the 1800s, this area was known as an extension of the Greater Yellow Grass Marsh. Extensive flood control programs have created reservoirs, parks and waterfowl centres along the Souris River. Between 1988 and 1995, the Rafferty-Alameda Project was constructed to alleviate spring flooding problems created by the Souris River.

=== Climate ===
Weyburn has a humid continental climate (Köppen Dfb) typical of Southern Saskatchewan.

Climate data for Weyburn Climate ID: 4018760; coordinates 49°39′N 103°50′W; elevation: 569.7 m (1,869 ft); 1981–2010 normals, extremes 1916–present
Month	Jan	Feb	Mar	Apr	May	Jun	Jul	Aug	Sep	Oct	Nov	Dec	Year
Record high °C (°F)	11.5 (52.7)	16.0 (60.8)	23.5 (74.3)	32.2 (90.0)	37.5 (99.5)	40.5 (104.9)	42.5 (108.5)	40.0 (104.0)	38.0 (100.4)	31.1 (88.0)	24.0 (75.2)	14.5 (58.1)	42.5 (108.5)
Mean daily maximum °C (°F)	−8.2 (17.2)	−5.4 (22.3)	1.4 (34.5)	11.9 (53.4)	18.6 (65.5)	23.2 (73.8)	26.5 (79.7)	26.2 (79.2)	19.6 (67.3)	11.4 (52.5)	0.8 (33.4)	−6.1 (21.0)	10.0 (50.0)
Daily mean °C (°F)	−13.5 (7.7)	−10.5 (13.1)	−3.6 (25.5)	5.2 (41.4)	11.7 (53.1)	16.7 (62.1)	19.6 (67.3)	18.8 (65.8)	12.5 (54.5)	5.1 (41.2)	−4.2 (24.4)	−11.1 (12.0)	3.9 (39.0)
Mean daily minimum °C (°F)	−18.8 (−1.8)	−15.6 (3.9)	−8.7 (16.3)	−1.5 (29.3)	4.8 (40.6)	10.1 (50.2)	12.7 (54.9)	11.4 (52.5)	5.5 (41.9)	−1.3 (29.7)	−9.1 (15.6)	−16.2 (2.8)	−2.2 (28.0)
Record low °C (°F)	−42.9 (−45.2)	−41.9 (−43.4)	−41.1 (−42.0)	−30.6 (−23.1)	−13.3 (8.1)	−3.9 (25.0)	−2.2 (28.0)	−2.2 (28.0)	−13.3 (8.1)	−20.6 (−5.1)	−34.0 (−29.2)	−42.0 (−43.6)	−42.9 (−45.2)
Average precipitation mm (inches)	19.7 (0.78)	11.9 (0.47)	22.2 (0.87)	27.6 (1.09)	56.8 (2.24)	75.5 (2.97)	66.1 (2.60)	47.5 (1.87)	33.2 (1.31)	24.2 (0.95)	18.5 (0.73)	20.8 (0.82)	423.9 (16.69)
Average rainfall mm (inches)	0.7 (0.03)	0.8 (0.03)	6.1 (0.24)	19.2 (0.76)	51.3 (2.02)	75.5 (2.97)	66.1 (2.60)	47.5 (1.87)	32.1 (1.26)	16.4 (0.65)	2.2 (0.09)	0.5 (0.02)	318.2 (12.53)
Average snowfall cm (inches)	19.0 (7.5)	11.1 (4.4)	16.1 (6.3)	8.3 (3.3)	5.5 (2.2)	0.0 (0.0)	0.0 (0.0)	0.0 (0.0)	1.1 (0.4)	7.8 (3.1)	16.4 (6.5)	20.3 (8.0)	105.7 (41.6)
Average precipitation days (≥ 0.2 mm)	11.2	8.8	9.4	9.3	13.0	16.3	14.0	12.5	10.7	9.7	8.7	11.9	135.6
Average rainy days (≥ 0.2 mm)	0.44	0.6	2.5	6.9	12.5	16.3	14.0	12.5	10.4	7.7	1.6	0.68	86.2
Average snowy days (≥ 0.2 cm)	10.7	8.3	7.3	3.0	0.74	0.0	0.0	0.0	0.3	2.4	7.4	11.4	51.6
Mean monthly sunshine hours	98.0	125.4	150.4	222.7	268.3	309.4	353.0	294.5	192.5	176.0	117.3	80.1	2,387.7
Percentage possible sunshine	36.5	44.0	40.9	54.1	56.4	63.6	71.9	65.8	50.7	52.6	42.8	31.4	50.9
Source: Environment and Climate Change Canada (January minimum), (February minimum)

== Economy ==
Weyburn is the largest inland grain gathering point in Canada. Well over half a million tons of grain pass through the Weyburn terminals each year. Oil and gas exploration make up the other major component of the economy.

== Culture ==
The Soo Line Historical Museum (c. 1910) is a Municipal Heritage Property under Saskatchewan's Heritage Property Act.

Weyburn is also home to the world's first curling museum, the Turner Curling Museum.

== Education ==
=== Elementary and secondary ===
The public school system, South East Cornerstone School Division No. 209, operates the following schools.

- Assiniboia Park Elementary School
- Legacy Park Elementary School
- Weyburn Comprehensive High School
- Haig School (now closed)
- Queen Elizabeth School (now closed)
- Souris School (now closed)

It also operated Weyburn Junior High School from 1966 to 2016, which was closed in favour of relocating students to Weyburn Comprehensive High School.

Haig School, Queen Elizabeth School, and Souris School are being closed in favour of relocating students to Legacy Park Elementary School in September 2021.

The separate school system, Holy Family Roman Catholic Separate School Division No. 140, operates St. Michael School.

=== Post-secondary ===
Southeast College offers technical, trade and non-degree programs, as well as distance learning from the University of Regina and University of Saskatchewan.

=== Other ===
The Weyburn Public Library is a branch of the Southeast Regional Library system.

== Infrastructure ==
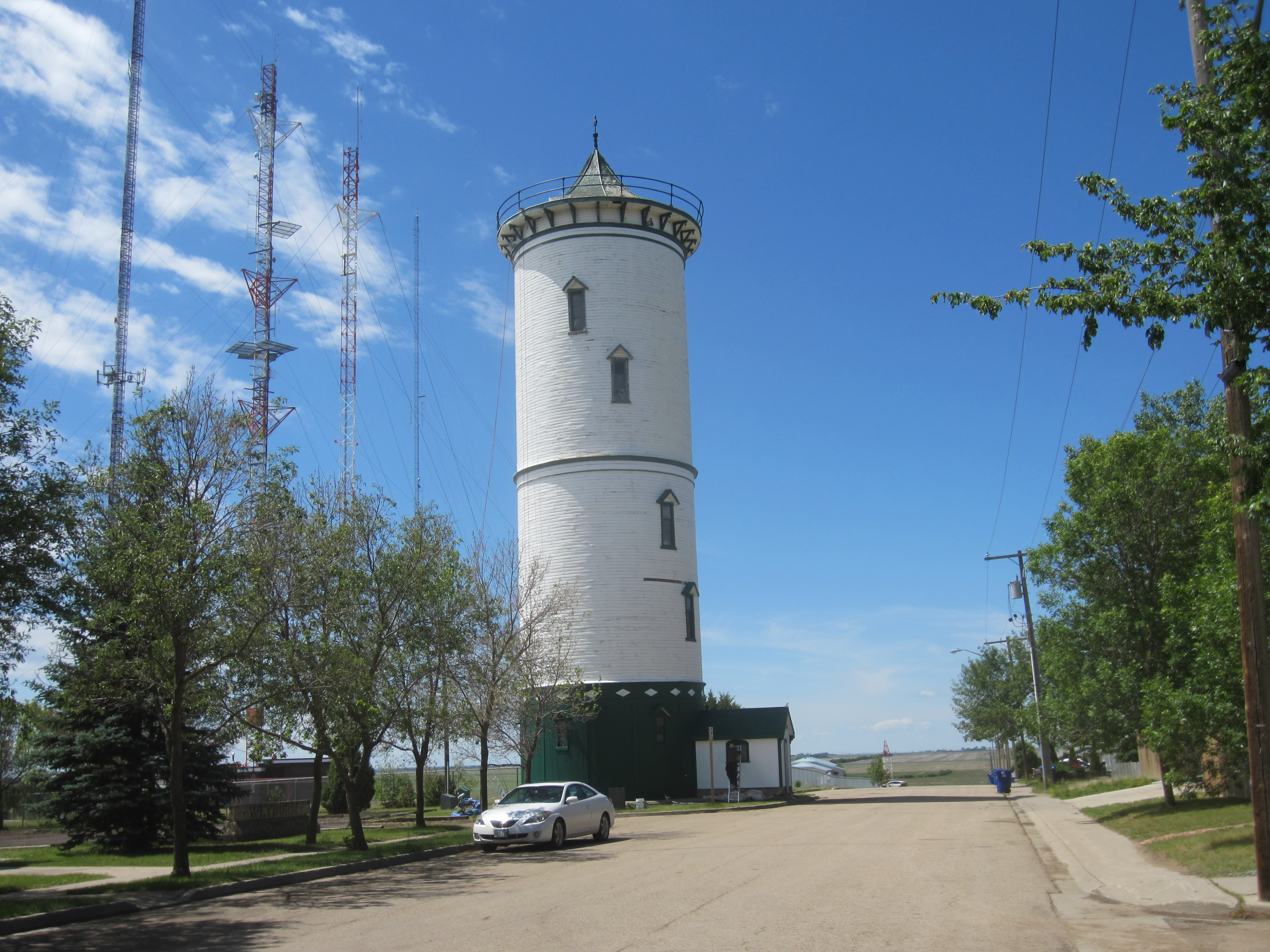
The 27 m (90 ft) water tower is one of only four of this type in Saskatchewan. It was in service from 1910 to 1977. It stands on Signal Hill in Weyburn, which is still an important site for telecommunications towers and once had the tallest tower in Western Canada.

=== Transportation ===
Weyburn is at the junction of highways 13, 35, and 39. Although it has no scheduled flights Weyburn Airport (RCAF Station Weyburn) is northeast of the city.

=== Utilities ===
Electricity is provided by SaskPower and natural gas is provided by SaskEnergy. The city maintains its own water treatment plant and waste management system. The city's water is sourced from Nickle Lake. Telephone and internet services are provided by both SaskTel and Access Communications.

=== Health care ===
The Weyburn General Hospital is operated by the SunCountry Health Region.

=== Public safety ===
The Weyburn Police Service and local Royal Canadian Mounted Police (RCMP) detachment provide law enforcement for the city. Fire protection services are provided by the Weyburn Fire Department.

== Sports and recreation ==
Weyburn is the home of the Weyburn Red Wings of the Saskatchewan Junior Hockey League (SJHL) and the Weyburn Beavers of the Western Canadian Baseball League, a collegiate summer baseball league in Canada's prairie provinces. In addition, Weyburn is home to Saskatchewan's largest amateur wrestling club.

== Local media ==
- Golden West Broadcasting operates three radio stations that serve Weyburn and the surrounding area; full service classic hits station CFSL 1190 AM, hot adult contemporary station CKRC-FM 103.5, and country music station CHWY-FM 106.7. All three stations, and the cluster's news website Discover Weyburn, are based out of studios on 305 Souris Avenue in downtown Weyburn.
- Glacier Media publishes three newspapers for Weyburn and area: the Weyburn Review, Weyburn and Area Booster, and Weyburn This Week.

== Notable people ==
- Tenille Arts - country music singer
- Pat Binns - former premier of Prince Edward Island
- Neil Cameron - Quebec politician, academic, journalist
- Graham DeLaet - professional golfer
- Shirley Douglas - actress
- Tommy Douglas - politician, recipient of The Greatest Canadian award in 2004
- Larry Giroux, played in the NHL for the Detroit Red Wings, Hartford Whalers, Kansas City Scouts, and St. Louis Blues
- Brett Jones - professional football player
- Guy Gavriel Kay - writer
- Trenna Keating – actress
- Brendon LaBatte - professional football player
- W. O. Mitchell - writer
- John Saywell - Canadian historian
- Dave "Tiger" Williams - former professional hockey player

== See also ==
- List of cities in Saskatchewan
