= Estevan =

City in Saskatchewan, Canada

- City
- City of Estevan

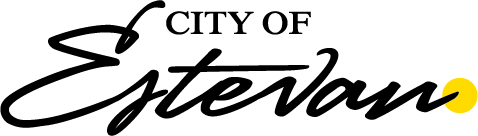
- Logo
- Nickname: The Energy City
- Location of Estevan in Saskatchewan
- Coordinates: 49°08′21″N 102°59′10″W
- Country: Canada
- Province: Saskatchewan
- First settler: 1892
- Village: 1899
- Town: 1906
- City: March 1, 1957

Government
  - Type: Mayor–council government
  - Mayor: Anthony Sernick

Area
  - Land: 9.16 km^{2} (3.54 sq mi)

Population (2021)
  - Total: 10,851
  - Density: 1,228.9/km^{2} (3,183/sq mi)
- Forward sortation area: S4A
- Website: estevan.ca

Estevan is the eleventh-largest city in Saskatchewan, Canada. It is approximately 16 kilometres (9.9 mi) north of the Canada–United States border. The Souris River runs by the city. This city is surrounded by the Rural Municipality of Estevan No. 5.

== History ==
The first settlers in what was to become Estevan arrived in 1892, along with the expansion of the Canadian Pacific Railway. It was incorporated as a village in 1899, and later became a town in 1906. On March 1, 1957, Estevan acquired the status of a city, which, in Saskatchewan terms, is any community of 5,000 or more.

The name origin is attributed to George Stephen's registered telegraphic address, Estevan. George Stephen was the first President of the Canadian Pacific Railway, from 1881 to 1888.

=== World War I military unit ===
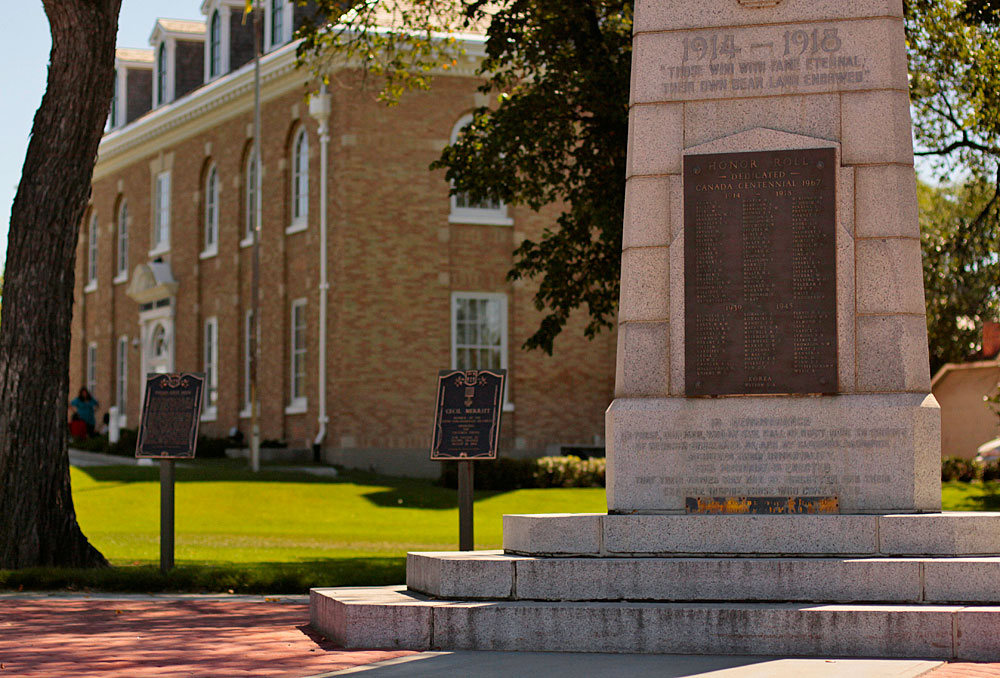
Cenotaph and law courts

On December 22, 1915, the 152nd (Weyburn-Estevan) Battalion, CEF was authorised and recruited men from the area before departing to Great Britain on October 3, 1916.

=== 1931 riot ===
Estevan was the site of the notorious Estevan riot in 1931. Although most of the strikers were from nearby Bienfait, the strike is associated with Estevan because it was in this city the demonstrators were met by members of the Royal Canadian Mounted Police. After the subsequent riot, which lasted 45 minutes, three strikers lay dead. It was later proven the three miners had been killed by the RCMP. The miners had been organised by the Workers' Unity League.

== Demographics ==
In the 2021 Census of Population conducted by Statistics Canada, Estevan had a population of 10,851 living in 4,584 of its 5,368 total private dwellings, a change of −5.5% from its 2016 population of 11,483. With a land area of 18.3 km^{2} (7.1 sq mi), it had a population density of 593.0/km^{2} (1,535.7/sq mi) in 2021.

Canada census – Estevan community profile

	2021	2016	2011
Population	10,851 (-5.5% from 2016)	11,258 (3.8% from 2011)	11,054 (9.6% from 2006)
Land area	18.30 km^{2} (7.07 sq mi)	9.16 km^{2} (3.54 sq mi)	18.85 km^{2} (7.28 sq mi)
Population density	592.9/km^{2} (1,536/sq mi)	1,228.9/km^{2} (3,183/sq mi)	586.6/km^{2} (1,519/sq mi)
Median age	38.8 (M: 38.4, F: 39.2)	36.4 (M: 35.7, F: 37.1)	36.0 (M: 34.7, F: 37.6)
Private dwellings	5,368 (total) 4,584 (occupied)	5,237 (total)	4,789 (total)
Median household income	$94,000	$96,736	$88,746

References: 2021 2016 2011

Population history of Estevan

Year	Pop.	±%
1901	181	—
1911	1,981	+994.5%
1921	2,290	+15.6%
1931	2,936	+28.2%
1941	3,120	+6.3%
1951	3,935	+26.1%
1961	7,728	+96.4%
1971	9,150	+18.4%

Year	Pop.	±%
1981	9,174	+0.3%
1991	10,240	+11.6%
2001	10,242	+0.0%
2006	10,084	−1.5%
2011	11,054	+9.6%
2016	11,258	+1.8%
2021	10,851	−3.6%

Population amounts are not adjusted for boundary changes.
Source: Statistics Canada

=== Ethnicity ===
Panethnic groups in the City of Estevan (2001−2021)
Panethnic group	2021		2016		2011		2006		2001	
Panethnic group	Pop.	%	Pop.	%	Pop.	%	Pop.	%	Pop.	%
European (Note: Statistic includes all persons that did not make up part of a visible minority or an indigenous identity.)	8,485	79.82%	9,100	80.82%	9,850	90.87%	9,410	94.81%	9,605	95.33%
Southeast Asian (Note: Statistic includes total responses of "Filipino" and "Southeast Asian" under visible minority section on census.)	1,015	9.55%	985	8.75%	195	1.8%	15	0.15%	35	0.35%
Indigenous	560	5.27%	630	5.6%	475	4.38%	345	3.48%	335	3.33%
South Asian	170	1.6%	250	2.22%	85	0.78%	30	0.3%	10	0.1%
East Asian (Note: Statistic includes total responses of "Chinese", "Korean", and "Japanese" under visible minority section on census.)	170	1.6%	80	0.71%	85	0.78%	20	0.2%	85	0.84%
African	140	1.32%	125	1.11%	70	0.65%	60	0.6%	0	0%
Middle Eastern (Note: Statistic includes total responses of "West Asian" and "Arab" under visible minority section on census.)	30	0.28%	20	0.18%	0	0%	0	0%	0	0%
Latin American	10	0.09%	30	0.27%	0	0%	40	0.4%	0	0%
Other/multiracial (Note: Statistic includes total responses of "Visible minority, n.i.e." and "Multiple visible minorities" under visible minority section on census.)	45	0.42%	45	0.4%	0	0%	0	0%	10	0.1%
Total responses	10,630	97.96%	11,260	98.06%	10,840	98.06%	9,925	98.42%	10,075	98.37%
Total population	10,851	100%	11,483	100%	11,054	100%	10,084	100%	10,242	100%
Note: Totals greater than 100% due to multiple origin responses

== Economy ==
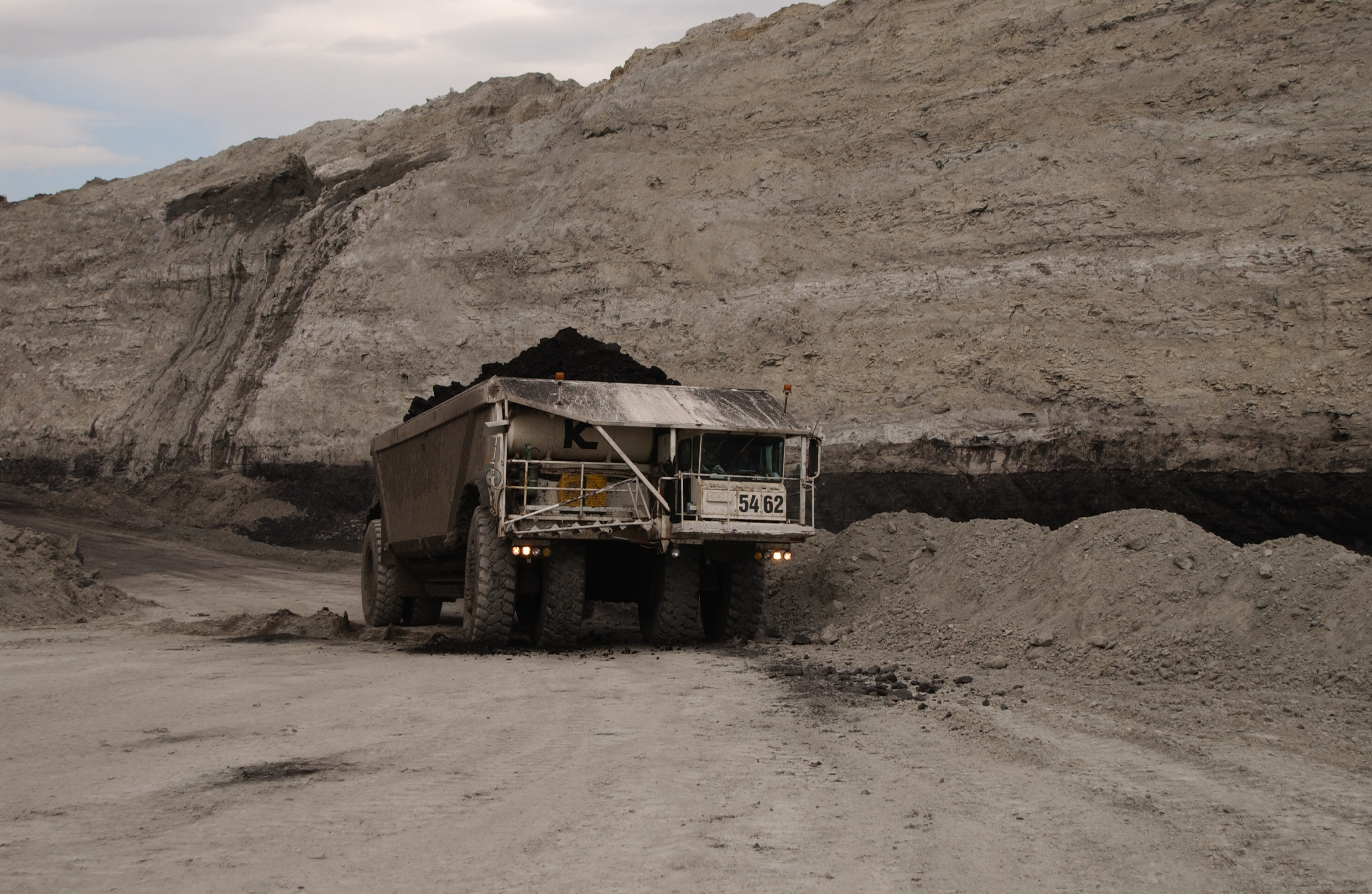
Coal hauler

The major industries in Estevan are coal mining, power generation at nearby Boundary Dam Power Station and Shand Power Station, oil and gas, and agriculture.

== Arts and culture ==
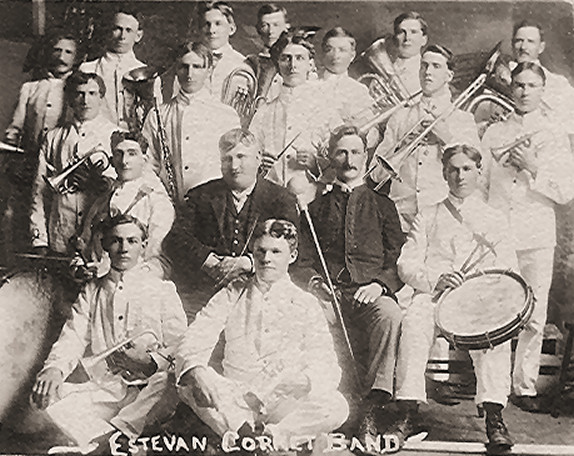
Estevan Cornet Band

=== Museums and galleries ===
The city of Estevan has two museums, one of which is primarily a gallery.

The Estevan Art Gallery and Museum, formerly the Estevan National Exhibition Centre, was founded in 1978. The Estevan Art Gallery is a free public gallery that showcases contemporary art. The Gallery's permanent collection includes woodblock-print works by Andrew King. The Estevan Art Gallery and Museum, EAGM, also features the North-West Mounted Police Wood End Post Historical Site, NWMP Museum. This museum is in a house which is the oldest-known North-West Mounted Police Detachment Post in Saskatchewan and holds a collection related to the North-West Mounted Police and the 1874 March West from Roche Percee to Estevan.

The Souris Valley Museum, SVM, is a local and regional history museum focused on human development and daily life within south-east Saskatchewan. It was founded in 2001, primarily from the collection of Stan Durr. The museum provides an engaging depiction of the social and cultural influences and economic development of south-east Saskatchewan. The collection includes the Schneller Schoolhouse, a Threshing Cook Car, a Homesteader Shack, two of Estevan's original Firetrucks, and a Heritage Mining Display.

=== Arts council ===
The Estevan Arts Council, founded in 1967, is a non-profit organisation that offers art classes and workshops, adjudicates art shows, hosts concerts, and provides a youth art scholarships through the work of volunteers and community donations and grants.

=== Sports ===
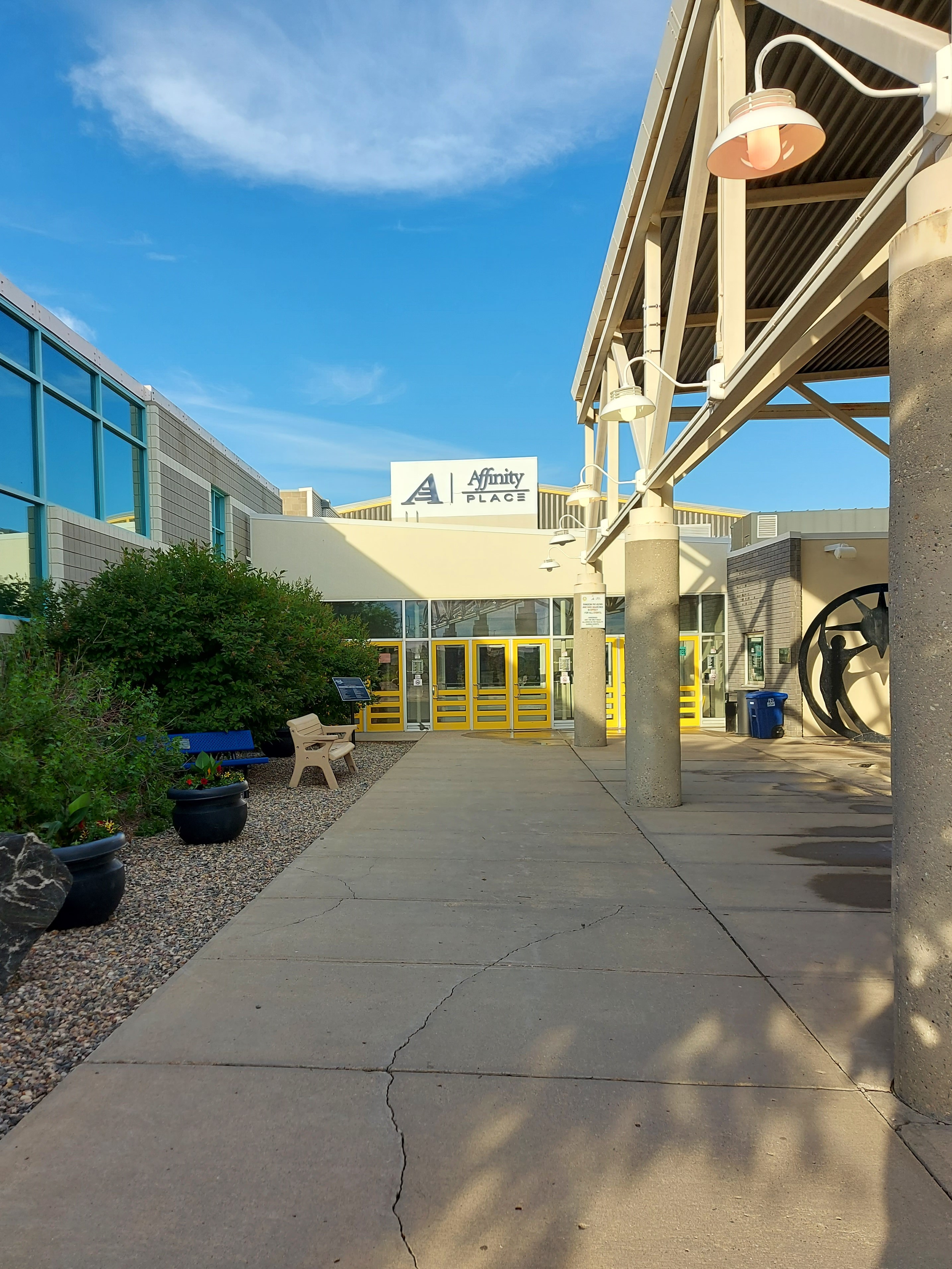
Affinity Place entrance

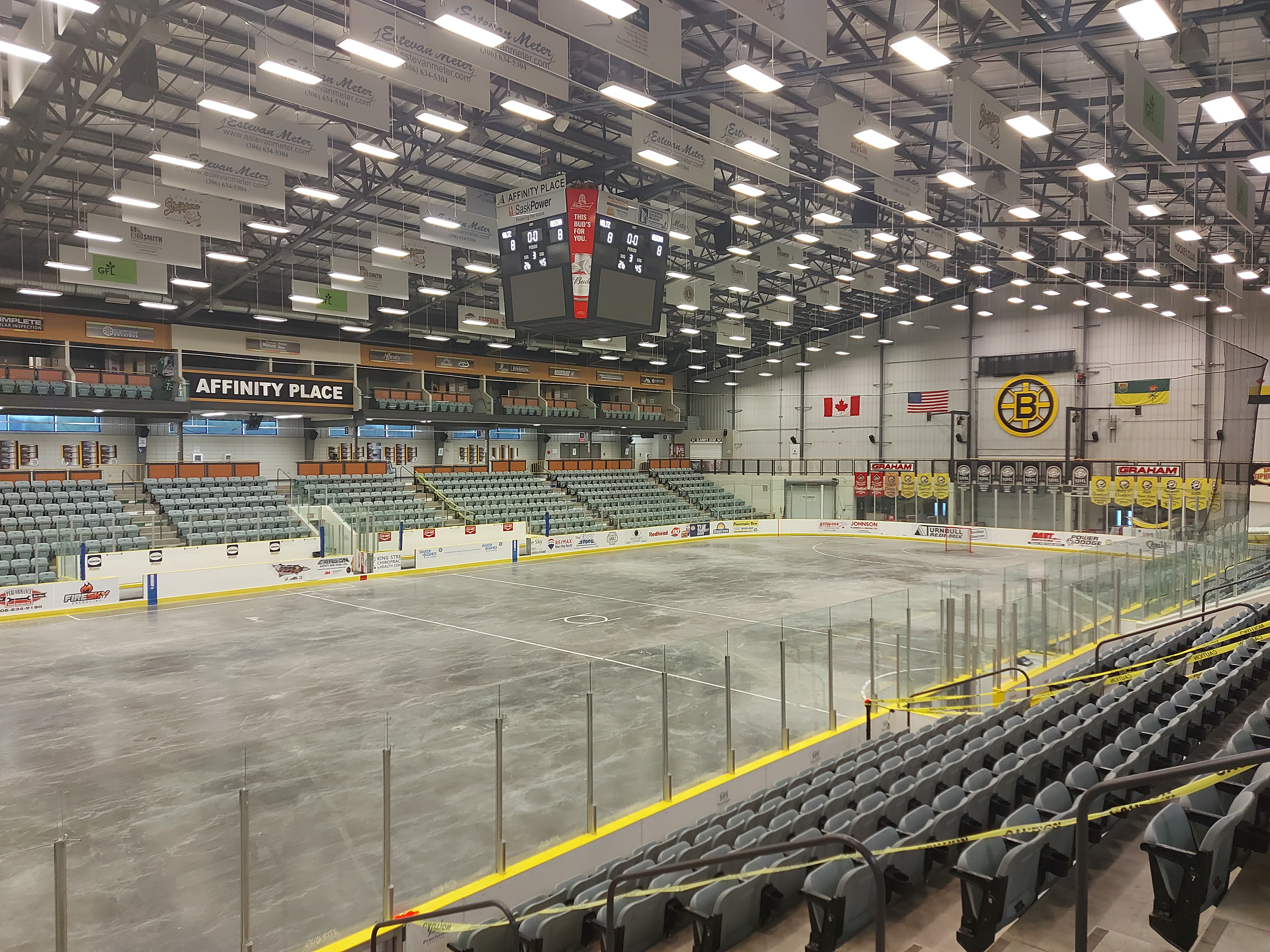
Inside Affinity Place

Affinity Place is a 2,650 seat Multi-Purpose Entertainment and Sports Facility that was built to supplement the two other ageing ice surfaces in Estevan, the Civic Auditorium and Lignite Miners Centre. It opened on 15 April 2011. Affinity Place is home to the Estevan Bruins, a junior ice hockey team playing in the Saskatchewan Junior Hockey League (SJHL), and the Midget AAA Estevan Bears. Affinity Place also has a Racquetball court, swimming pool, and a gym. Right next to Affinity Place is the Estevan Curling Club.

The nine-team Saskota Baseball League has two teams in Estevan, the Southeast Diamondbacks and the Estevan Tap House Wolves.

A former Estevan team, the Estevan Bears, played in the Big 6 Hockey League. They won the Lincoln Trophy three straight years from 1985 to 1987. CJSL AM 1150 broadcasts many Big 6 hockey games.

The Estevan Motor Speedway hosts regular stock car races in the summer. It’s the only racetrack in Canada certified by the International Motor Contest Association (IMCA).

The city's only high school, Estevan Comprehensive School, offers athletics in a range of sports including football, volleyball and basketball.

== Climate ==
Estevan has a humid continental climate (Köppen climate classification Dfb) It falls into the NRC Plant Hardiness Zone 4a.

Estevan's climate is characterized by cold, long, and dry winters with warm, short and, relatively humid summers. The mean temperature in January, the coldest month, is −13.9 °C (7.0 °F). The precipitation in winter is chiefly snow, averaging 56.0 cm (22.05 in). The spring is a short transitional season, with a mean temperature of 4.4 °C (39.9 °F) and 107.3 mm (4.22 in) of precipitation, with significant snowfall in April. The summer is usually warm (the mean average high temperature is 25.3 °C (77.5 °F) (average high in July, the warmest month, is 25.9 °C (78.6 °F) and humid (190.8 mm (7.51 in) of total precipitation). Autumn, as spring, is transitional, being warm in September and cooler in October and November. At this time of the year, the average temperature is 4.6 °C (40.3 °F) and the total precipitation is 85.9 mm (3.38 in). Estevan is the sunniest city year-round in Canada, and it is also the city with the clearest skies year round in Canada.

The highest temperature ever recorded in Estevan was 43.3 °C (110 °F) on 5 July 1936, and 5 July 1937. The coldest temperature ever recorded was −46.7 °C (−52 °F) on 11 January 1916, and 16 February 1936.

Climate data for Estevan Airport, elevation: 572 m (1,877 ft), 1991–2020 normals, extremes 1900–present (Note: Climate data for Estevan was collected in the city of Estevan from 1900–1944, and at Estevan Airport from 1944 to the present day.)
Month	Jan	Feb	Mar	Apr	May	Jun	Jul	Aug	Sep	Oct	Nov	Dec	Year
Record high °C (°F)	11.4 (52.5)	17.0 (62.6)	26.1 (79.0)	32.2 (90.0)	38.7 (101.7)	39.1 (102.4)	43.3 (109.9)	41.1 (106.0)	38.3 (100.9)	33.3 (91.9)	22.1 (71.8)	15.6 (60.1)	43.3 (109.9)
Mean daily maximum °C (°F)	−8.4 (16.9)	−6.2 (20.8)	1.0 (33.8)	11.1 (52.0)	18.3 (64.9)	22.7 (72.9)	25.9 (78.6)	26.0 (78.8)	20.3 (68.5)	11.2 (52.2)	1.3 (34.3)	−6.0 (21.2)	9.8 (49.6)
Daily mean °C (°F)	−13.9 (7.0)	−11.8 (10.8)	−4.5 (23.9)	4.4 (39.9)	11.2 (52.2)	16.3 (61.3)	19.1 (66.4)	18.4 (65.1)	12.9 (55.2)	4.8 (40.6)	−4.0 (24.8)	−11.2 (11.8)	3.5 (38.3)
Mean daily minimum °C (°F)	−19.4 (−2.9)	−17.3 (0.9)	−10.0 (14.0)	−2.2 (28.0)	4.1 (39.4)	10.0 (50.0)	12.3 (54.1)	10.8 (51.4)	5.3 (41.5)	−1.7 (28.9)	−9.3 (15.3)	−16.3 (2.7)	−2.8 (27.0)
Record low °C (°F)	−46.7 (−52.1)	−46.7 (−52.1)	−36.7 (−34.1)	−25.0 (−13.0)	−10.6 (12.9)	−3.9 (25.0)	−0.6 (30.9)	−3.3 (26.1)	−11.1 (12.0)	−21.5 (−6.7)	−32.8 (−27.0)	−39.5 (−39.1)	−46.7 (−52.1)
Average precipitation mm (inches)	16.7 (0.66)	14.9 (0.59)	18.9 (0.74)	27.3 (1.07)	65.7 (2.59)	84.7 (3.33)	66.2 (2.61)	47.4 (1.87)	45.5 (1.79)	29.2 (1.15)	19.9 (0.78)	18.4 (0.72)	454.9 (17.91)
Average rainfall mm (inches)	0.67 (0.03)	1.2 (0.05)	7.1 (0.28)	16.3 (0.64)	52.1 (2.05)	74.8 (2.94)	67.5 (2.66)	51.7 (2.04)	35.7 (1.41)	20.4 (0.80)	3.7 (0.15)	0.49 (0.02)	331.6 (13.06)
Average snowfall cm (inches)	22.2 (8.7)	15.3 (6.0)	16.5 (6.5)	7.9 (3.1)	4.0 (1.6)	0.05 (0.02)	0.0 (0.0)	0.0 (0.0)	0.47 (0.19)	7.7 (3.0)	16.4 (6.5)	20.1 (7.9)	110.7 (43.6)
Average precipitation days (≥ 0.2 mm)	10.2	8.4	8.6	9.5	11.5	14.2	10.6	9.4	9.1	7.8	8.2	11.5	118.9
Average rainy days (≥ 0.2 mm)	0.63	0.87	3.1	5.9	11.1	13.5	11.1	10.0	8.8	5.9	1.9	0.87	73.7
Average snowy days (≥ 0.2 cm)	10.8	8.4	7.1	3.2	0.97	0.03	0.0	0.0	0.37	2.4	6.8	11.4	51.6
Mean monthly sunshine hours	113.8	135.9	178.6	230.1	257.3	276.2	324.8	292.8	213.2	170.8	111.6	99.2	2,404.3
Percentage possible sunshine	42.2	47.5	48.6	56.0	54.3	57.0	66.4	65.6	56.2	50.9	40.5	38.6	52.0
Source: Environment Canada

== Gallery ==
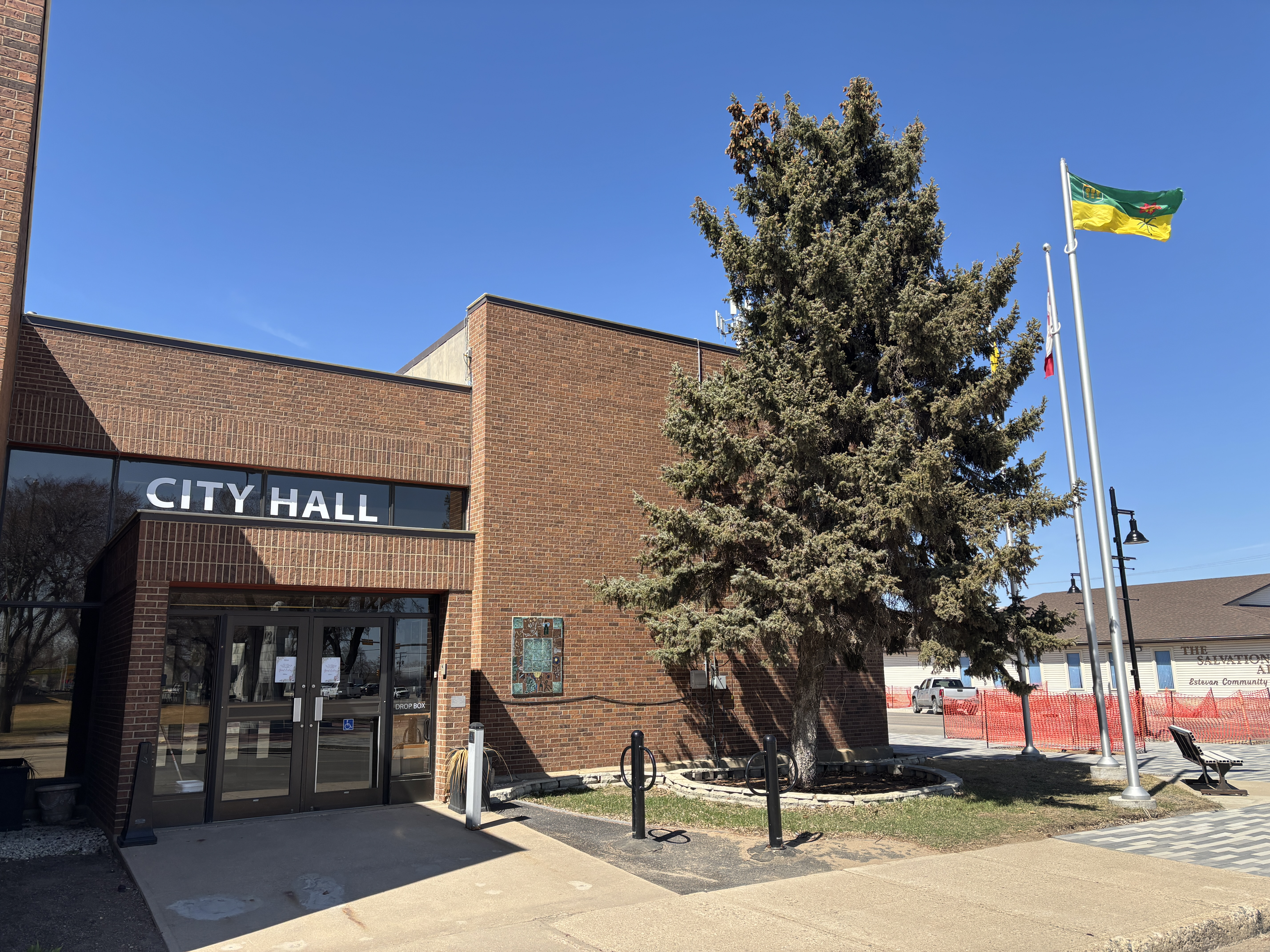
City hall

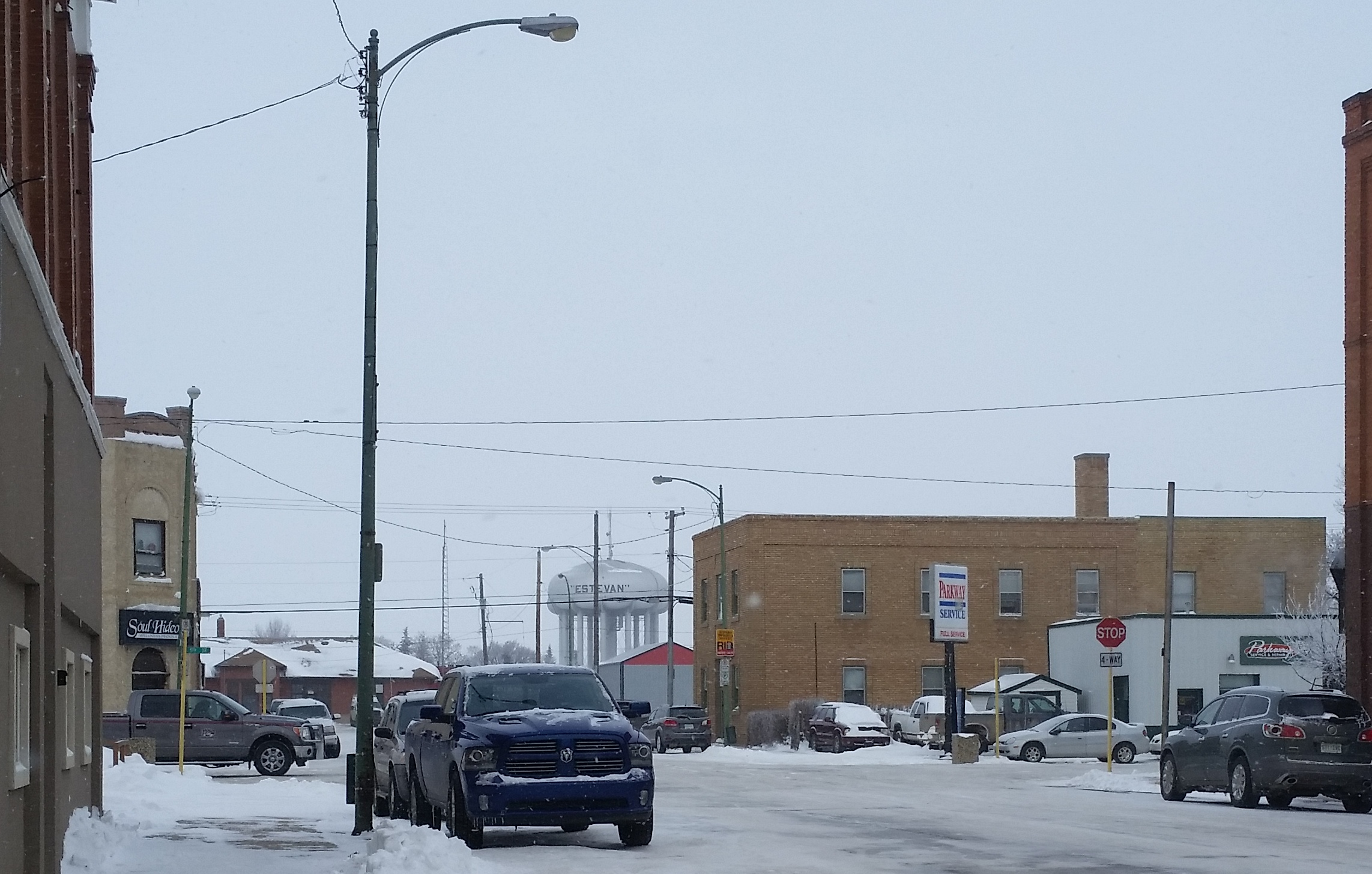
A downtown street in the winter

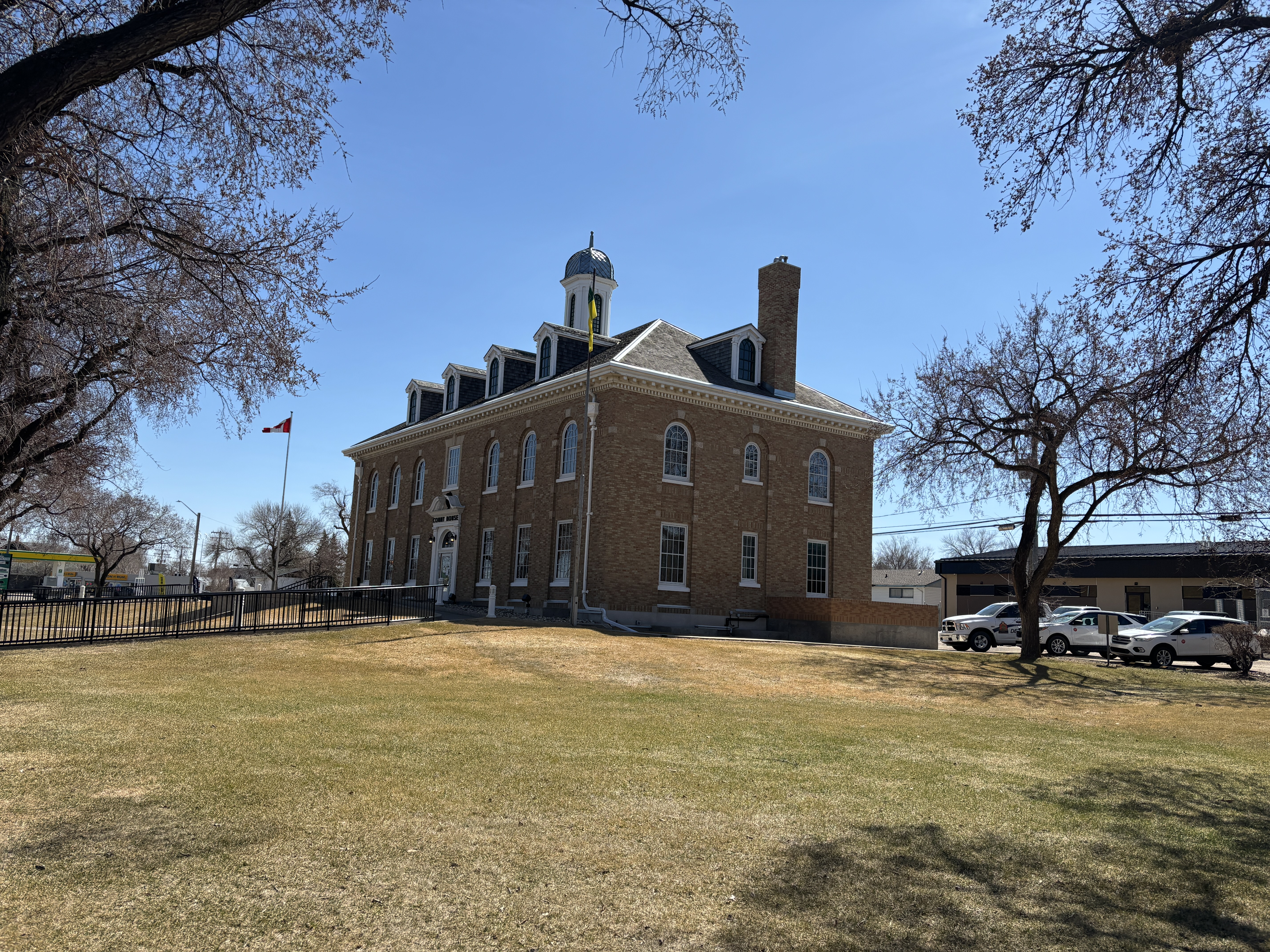
The law court

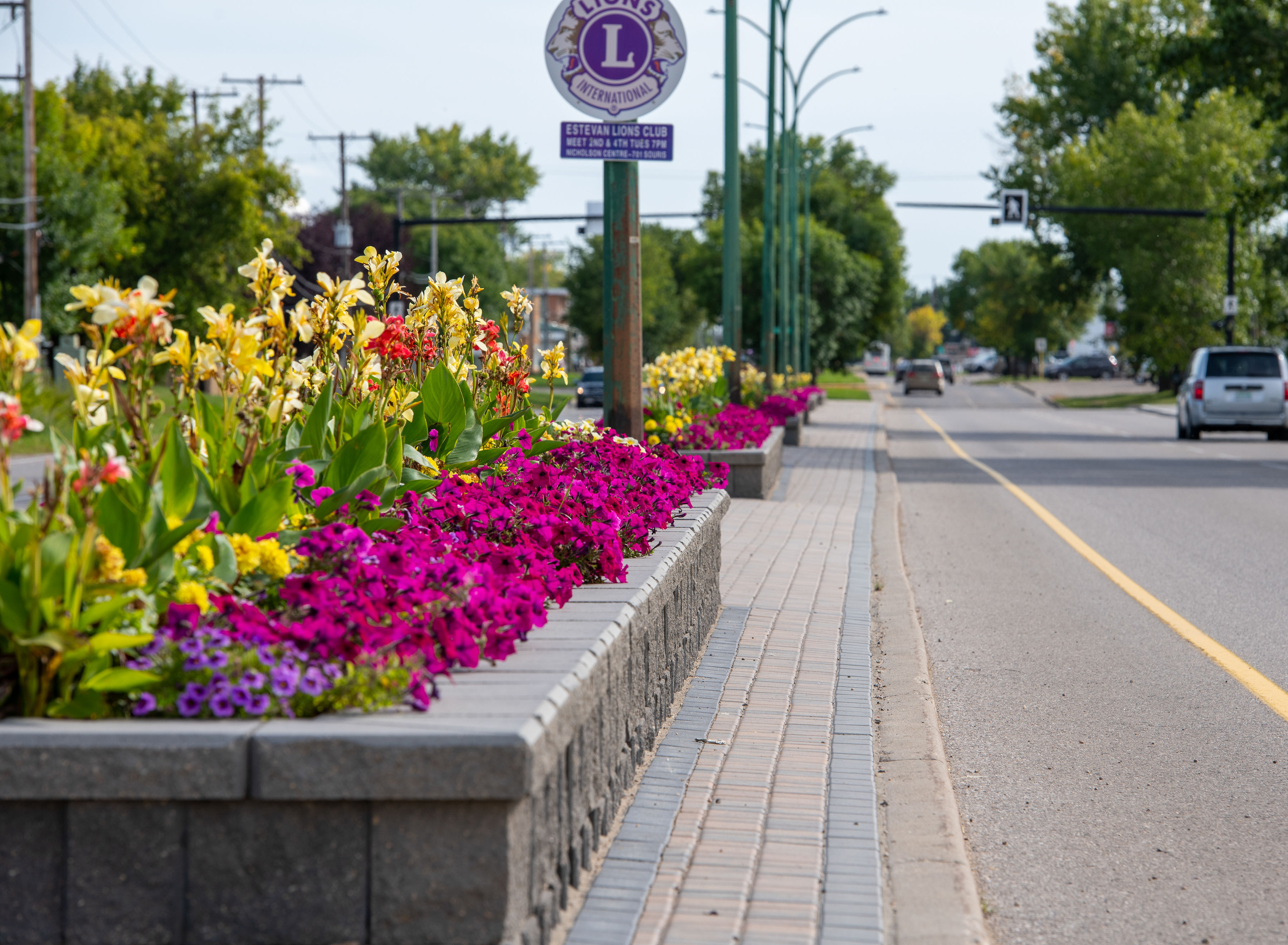
Highway 47 going into Estevan

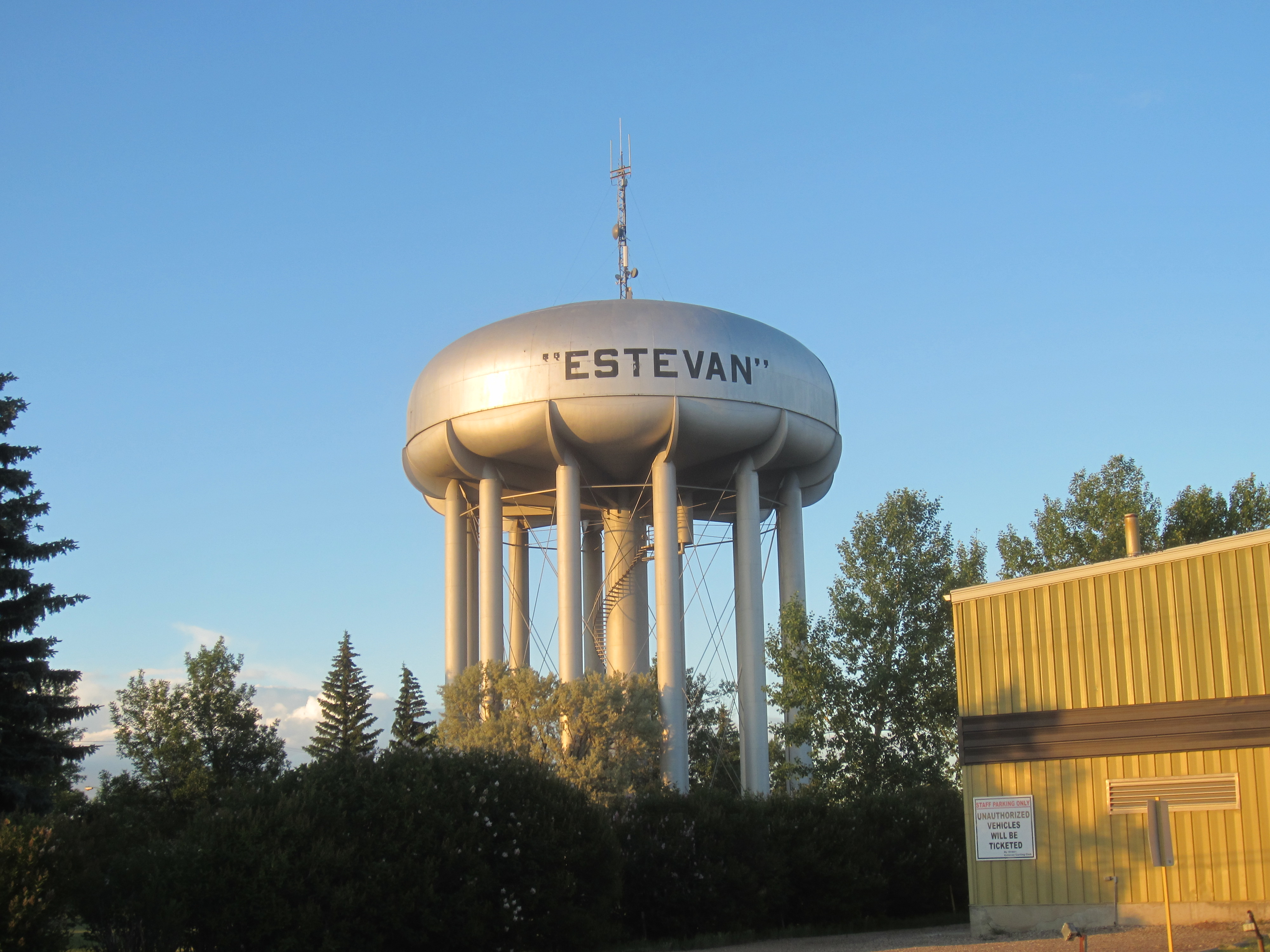
Water tower

== Local media ==
=== Newspapers ===
- The Estevan Mercury, the newspaper in Estevan since 1903, provided weekly distribution to every household in the city free of charge until 2025, when it ceased publication. The outlet continues to provide local information through its online affiliate, Sasktoday.ca. It also had a free TMC newspaper circulated throughout southeast Saskatchewan to over 9,000 homes; the Southeast Trader Express.
- Pipeline News, Saskatchewan Petroleum Monthly newspaper is also based out of Estevan. Southeast Saskatchewan has a significant amount of oil production, and the Pipeline News' main office is situated locally to report on these matters.
- Estevan Lifestyles is a free circulation weekly publication that shares the stories of the people in the Estevan area and the southeast corner of Saskatchewan. The publication also publishes NewsBreak, a daily coffee paper geared towards lighter reading.

=== Radio ===
- CJSL AM 1150, CHSN-FM 102.3, and CKSE-FM 106.1 all broadcast from studios on 5th Street in Estevan.
- The news website DiscoverEstevan.com is also run by the radio station offering local news, weather, and sports. All are owned by Golden West Broadcasting.

== Notable residents ==
- Blair Atcheynum, National Hockey League (NHL) player
- Dave Batters, politician
- Carter Beck, baseball player
- Dennis Cooley, poet
- Kimbi Daniels, hockey player
- Ana Egge, folk singer/songwriter
- Mina Forsyth, artist
- Eric Grimson, computer scientist, educator
- Chris Henderson, musician
- Howard Hilstrom, politician
- Andrew David Irvine, playwright
- Tanner Jeannot, NHL player
- Todd Kerns, musician
- Ross King, author
- Bill Knight, politician
- Ed Komarnicki, politician
- Eli Mandel, poet
- Fred Mandel, session musician
- Punch McLean, hockey coach
- Gerald McLellan, Saskatchewan ombudsman
- Al Nicholson, hockey player
- Brayden Pachal, NHL player
- Derrick Pouliot, NHL player
- Arnold Richardson, curler
- Andy Shauf, musician
- Kim Thorson, lawyer and politician
- Blaine Thurier, musician and film producer

== See also ==
- List of communities in Saskatchewan
- List of cities in Saskatchewan
- Coal mining in Saskatchewan
