= List of Memorial Cup champions =

The Memorial Cup

The Memorial Cup is a junior ice hockey club championship trophy awarded annually to the Canadian Hockey League (CHL) champion. Each year the champions from three CHL member leagues—the Western Hockey League (WHL), Ontario Hockey League (OHL), and Quebec Maritimes Junior Hockey League (QMJHL), along with a host team—compete in the Memorial Cup tournament. Sixty-one teams across the CHL's three member leagues are eligible to compete for the Memorial Cup, representing all ten provinces in Canada and four American states. The OHL's Kitchener Rangers are the defending champions.

Known originally as the OHA Memorial Cup, it was donated in 1919 by the Ontario Hockey Association in honour of the soldiers who died fighting for Canada in World War I. In 2010, the trophy was rededicated to honour all soldiers who died for Canada in any conflict. From its donation in 1919 until 1971, the Memorial Cup was awarded via a series of playoffs to the junior hockey champion of Canada. The Canadian Amateur Hockey Association moved to a three-team round-robin tournament format in 1972 when it divided Junior A hockey into two tiers, naming the Memorial Cup as the championship of the Major Junior rank. The tournament involved just the respective champions from the three CHL major junior leagues. The tournament expanded to the current four-team format including the host city in 1983.

The Western Hockey League and Ontario Hockey League have each won the title 19 times since the adoption of the three league tournament format in 1972, while the Quebec Maritimes Junior Hockey League has won 14. Since the creation of the Memorial Cup, the Toronto Marlboros have won the most titles with seven. Among currently active teams, the Oshawa Generals lead with five titles, the latest one in 2015.

== Champions and challengers ==
=== 1919 to 1971 ===
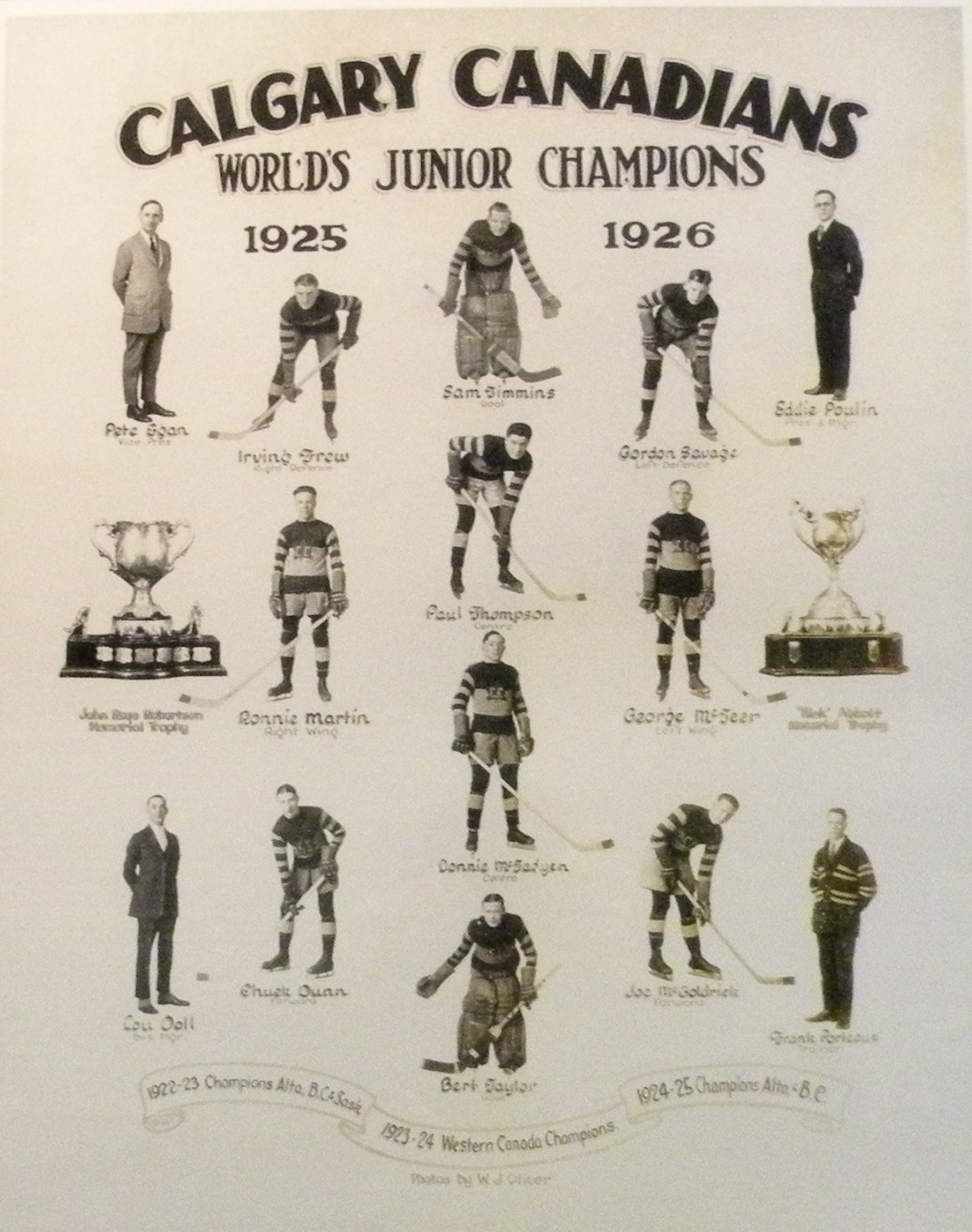
The 1926 Calgary Canadians were Alberta's first Memorial Cup champion.

The Memorial Cup was presented to the Canadian Amateur Hockey Association (CAHA) in 1919 by the Ontario Hockey Association (OHA) in remembrance of the soldiers who died fighting for Canada in World War I. It was to be awarded to the junior hockey champions of Canada in an east versus west format. Over its first 53 years of competition, the Eastern Canada champion, who from 1932 won the George Richardson Memorial Trophy, met the Western Canada champion, winners of the Abbott Cup. The first championship featured the University of Toronto Schools against the Regina Patricia (now the Pats) in a two-game, total-goals series. The University of Toronto Schools won the title easily, defeating Regina by scores of 14–3 and 15–5 to win the series with a total score of 29–8. Through this initial 53 years, the eastern representative won 33 Memorial Cups, while the western representative won 20 Memorial Cups.

The host of the Memorial Cup predominately fell on Toronto, Ontario, and Winnipeg, Manitoba in earlier years, with additional sites in Montreal, Quebec, and Ottawa, Ontario among them being used. Toronto was used due to the dominance of the teams in its vicinity, but Winnipeg had the only arena capable of creating artificial ice between Toronto and Vancouver, British Columbia, and became the western site chosen by the CAHA to hold the tournament in its early years. Beginning in the post-World War II era, cities and towns of the competing teams began hosting the Memorial Cup, such as Brandon and Flin Flon, Manitoba, Regina, Saskatchewan and Quebec City, Quebec.

The head-to-head competition for the Memorial Cup has changed formats several times. The CAHA moved to a best-of-three format in 1925 as the first team to win two games was declared the champion. In 1938, the series was increased to best-of-five, and to best-of-seven in 1943. There were two exceptions to these formats. The 1949 final between the Montreal Royals and the Brandon Wheat Kings required an eighth game after the third game ended in a tie.

The 1971 final between the Quebec Remparts and the Edmonton Oil Kings was nearly canceled outright in the wake of controversy surrounding the inclusion of the previously outlawed Western Canada Hockey League (WCHL) as the western league was allowed to use more over-age players and received a larger travel allowance from the CAHA. The differences were resolved, and an abbreviated best-of-three series was held in Quebec City.

While the Memorial Cup was not intended to be a challenge trophy, a team has twice challenged the defending champion for the cup. After the Toronto Canoe Club defeated the Selkirk Fishermen in 1920, they were met with a challenge by the Fort William Beavers for the trophy. Toronto agreed, and easily defeated Fort William 11–1 in a single game playoff. The second challenge occurred a half-century later, in 1970. The WCHL's Flin Flon Bombers challenged the Montreal Junior Canadiens. Considered an outlaw league by the CAHA, WCHL teams were not permitted to participate in the Memorial Cup playoffs. The Junior Canadiens declined the challenge.

TG = total goals, with the team scoring the most goals in two games winning the championship. From 1925 onward, the total represents the number of games won.

Cup	Champion	Result	Runner-up	Host location(s)
1919	University of Toronto Schools (East)	29–8 (TG)	Regina Patricia (West)	Toronto
1920	Toronto Canoe Club Paddlers (East)	15–5 (TG)	Selkirk Fishermen (West)	Toronto
1921	Winnipeg Junior Falcons (West)	11–9 (TG)	Stratford Midgets (East)	Toronto
1922	Fort William Great War Vets (East)	8–7 (TG)	Regina Patricia (West)	Winnipeg
1923	University of Manitoba Bisons (West)	14–6 (TG)	Kitchener Colts (East)	Toronto
1924	Owen Sound Greys (East)	7–5 (TG)	Calgary Canadians (West)	Winnipeg
1925	Regina Pats (West)	2–0	Toronto Aura Lee (East)	Toronto
1926	Calgary Canadians (West)	2–1	Queen's University (East)	Winnipeg
1927	Owen Sound Greys (East)	2–0	Port Arthur West End Jrs. (West)	Toronto
1928	Regina Monarchs (West)	2–1	Ottawa Gunners (East)	Toronto
1929	Toronto Marlboros (East)	2–0	Elmwood Millionaires (West)	Toronto
1930	Regina Pats (West)	2–0	West Toronto Nationals (East)	Winnipeg
1931	Elmwood Millionaires (West)	2–1	Ottawa Primroses (East)	Toronto and Ottawa
1932	Sudbury Cub Wolves (East)	2–1	Winnipeg Monarchs (West)	Winnipeg
1933	Newmarket Redmen (East)	2–0	Regina Pats (West)	Toronto
1934	Toronto St. Michael's Majors (East)	2–0	Edmonton A.C. Athletics (West)	Winnipeg
1935	Winnipeg Monarchs (West)	2–1	Sudbury Cub Wolves (East)	Winnipeg
1936	West Toronto Nationals (East)	2–0	Saskatoon Wesleys (West)	Toronto
1937	Winnipeg Monarchs (West)	2–1	Copper Cliff Redmen (East)	Toronto
1938	St. Boniface Seals (West)	3–2	Oshawa Generals (East)	Toronto
1939	Oshawa Generals (East)	3–1	Edmonton A.C. Roamers (West)	Toronto
1940	Oshawa Generals (East)	3–1	Kenora Thistles (West)	Winnipeg
1941	Winnipeg Rangers (West)	3–2	Montreal Royals (East)	Toronto and Montreal
1942	Portage la Prairie Terriers (West)	3–1	Oshawa Generals (East)	Winnipeg
1943	Winnipeg Rangers (West)	4–2	Oshawa Generals (East)	Toronto
1944	Oshawa Generals (East)	4–0	Trail Smoke Eaters (West)	Toronto
1945	Toronto St. Michael's Majors (East)	4–1	Moose Jaw Canucks (West)	Toronto
1946	Winnipeg Monarchs (West)	4–3	Toronto St. Michael's Majors (East)	Toronto
1947	Toronto St. Michael's Majors (East)	4–0	Moose Jaw Canucks (West)	Winnipeg, Moose Jaw and Regina
1948	Port Arthur West End Bruins (West)	4–0	Barrie Flyers (East)	Toronto
1949	Montreal Royals (East)	4–3–1	Brandon Wheat Kings (West)	Winnipeg and Brandon
1950	Montreal Junior Canadiens (East)	4–1	Regina Pats (West)	Montreal and Toronto
1951	Barrie Flyers (East)	4–0	Winnipeg Monarchs (West)	Toronto, Barrie and Quebec City
1952	Guelph Biltmores (East)	4–0	Regina Pats (West)	Toronto
1953	Barrie Flyers (East)	4–1	St. Boniface Canadiens (West)	Winnipeg and Brandon
1954	St. Catharines Teepees (East)	4–0–1	Edmonton Oil Kings (West)	Toronto
1955	Toronto Marlboros (East)	4–1	Regina Pats (West)	Regina
1956	Toronto Marlboros (East)	4–0–1	Regina Pats (West)	Toronto
1957	Flin Flon Bombers (West)	4–3	Ottawa-Hull Junior Canadiens (East)	Flin Flon and Regina
1958	Ottawa-Hull Junior Canadiens (East)	4–2	Regina Pats (West)	Ottawa and Hull
1959	Winnipeg Braves (West)	4–1	Peterborough TPT Petes (East)	Winnipeg and Brandon
1960	St. Catharines Teepees (East)	4–2	Edmonton Oil Kings (West)	St. Catharines and Toronto
1961	Toronto St. Michael's Majors (East)	4–2	Edmonton Oil Kings (West)	Edmonton
1962	Hamilton Red Wings (East)	4–1	Edmonton Oil Kings (West)	Hamilton, Guelph and Kitchener
1963	Edmonton Oil Kings (West)	4–2	Niagara Falls Flyers (East)	Edmonton
1964	Toronto Marlboros (East)	4–0	Edmonton Oil Kings (West)	Toronto
1965	Niagara Falls Flyers (East)	4–1	Edmonton Oil Kings (West)	Edmonton
1966	Edmonton Oil Kings (West)	4–2	Oshawa Generals (East)	Toronto
1967	Toronto Marlboros (East)	4–1	Port Arthur Marrs (West)	Port Arthur
1968	Niagara Falls Flyers (East)	4–1	Estevan Bruins (West)	Niagara Falls and Montreal
1969	Montreal Junior Canadiens (East)	4–0	Regina Pats (West)	Montreal and Regina
1970	Montreal Junior Canadiens (East)	4–0	Weyburn Red Wings (West)	Montreal
1971	Quebec Remparts (East)	2–0	Edmonton Oil Kings (West)	Quebec City

=== 1972 to 1982 ===
In 1970, the CAHA divided the Junior A ranks into two levels, creating a Major–Junior tier that consisted of three leagues: the Quebec Major Junior Hockey League (QMJHL), the Ontario Hockey Association (OHA, now the OHL) and the Western Canada Hockey League (WCHL, now WHL). It was decided that the Memorial Cup would be the championship trophy of the Major Junior leagues, while the Manitoba Centennial Trophy was created as the Junior A championship. The CAHA decided that beginning in 1972, the Memorial Cup would be determined via a double round-robin tournament (four games each) between the champions of the three leagues, featuring a single game championship involving the top two finishers in the tournament. The creation of the WHL's Portland Winter Hawks in 1976 opened the competition up to non-Canadian teams for the first time, and in 1982, the Winter Hawks became the first American team in Memorial Cup history to compete for the trophy (and, in 1983, the first American Memorial Cup champion – see next section).

Cup	Champion	Score	Runner-up	Additional participants	Host location(s)
1972	Cornwall Royals (QMJHL)	2–1	Peterborough Petes (OHA)	Edmonton Oil Kings (WCHL)	Ottawa
1973	Toronto Marlboros (OHA)	9–1	Quebec Remparts (QMJHL)	Medicine Hat Tigers (WCHL)	Montreal
1974	Regina Pats (WCHL)	7–4	Quebec Remparts (QMJHL)	St. Catharines Black Hawks (OHA)	Calgary
1975	Toronto Marlboros (OMJHL)	7–3	New Westminster Bruins (WCHL)	Sherbrooke Castors (QMJHL)	Kitchener
1976	Hamilton Fincups (OMJHL)	5–2	New Westminster Bruins (WCHL)	Quebec Remparts (QMJHL)	Montreal
1977	New Westminster Bruins (WCHL)	6–5	Ottawa 67's (OMJHL)	Sherbrooke Castors (QMJHL)	Vancouver
1978	New Westminster Bruins (WHL)	7–4	Peterborough Petes (OMJHL)	Trois-Rivières Draveurs (QMJHL)	Sudbury and Sault Ste. Marie
1979	Peterborough Petes (OMJHL)	2–1 (OT)	Brandon Wheat Kings (WHL)	Trois-Rivières Draveurs (QMJHL)	Sherbrooke, Trois-Rivières and Verdun
1980	Cornwall Royals (QMJHL)	3–2 (OT)	Peterborough Petes (OMJHL)	Regina Pats (WHL)	Brandon and Regina
1981	Cornwall Royals (QMJHL)	5–2	Kitchener Rangers (OHL)	Victoria Cougars (WHL)	Windsor
1982	Kitchener Rangers (OHL)	7–4	Sherbrooke Castors (QMJHL)	Portland Winter Hawks (WHL)	Hull

=== 1983 to present ===
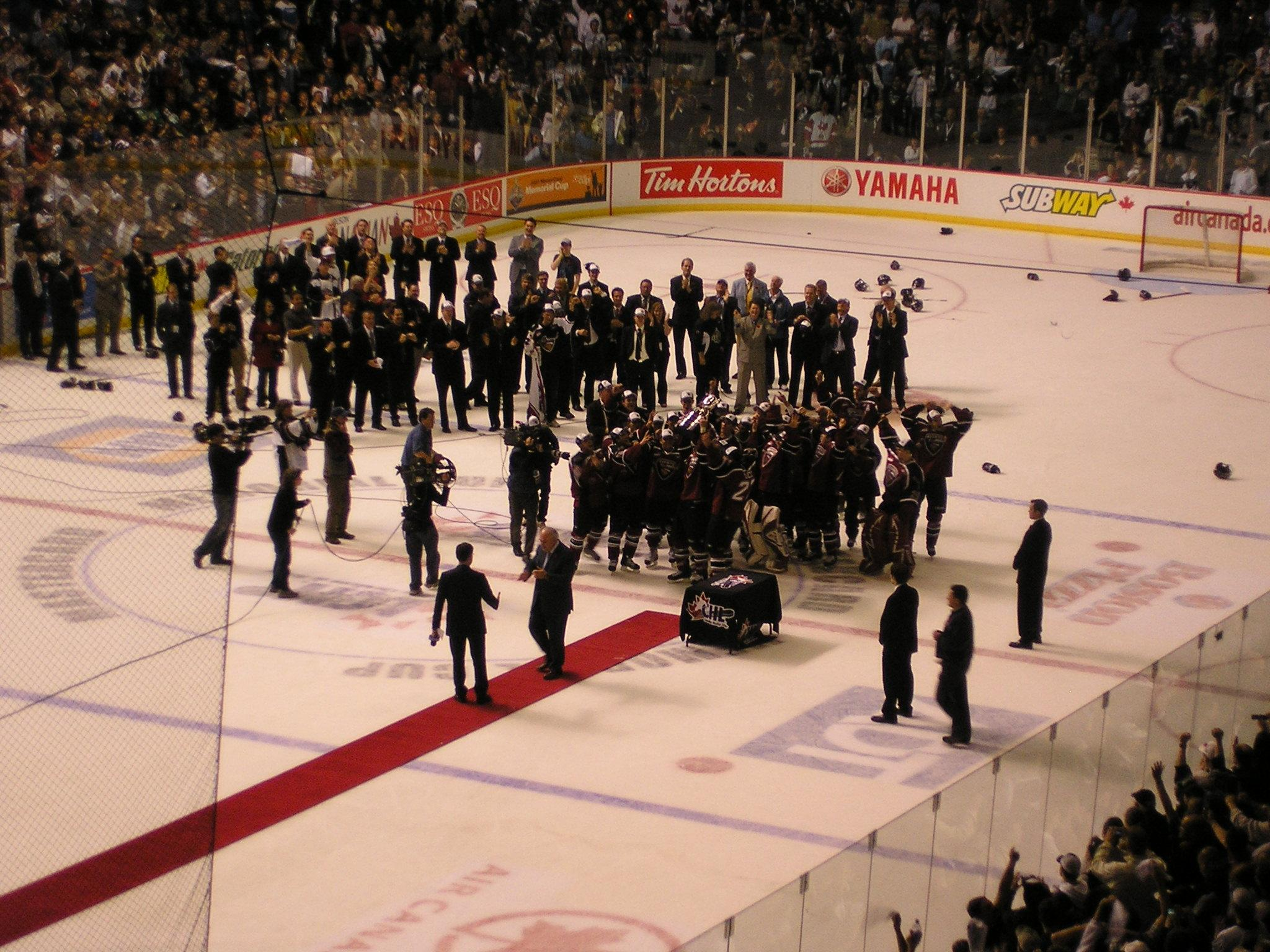
The Vancouver Giants celebrate after winning the 2007 championship on home ice.

The Memorial Cup tournament was expanded to four teams in 1983; a pre-determined host team was added in place of holding the tournament in a neutral host city. The first such host team was the Portland Winter Hawks, who set numerous firsts in the 1983 tournament. It represented the first time Memorial Cup games were held outside Canada, and by virtue of winning the tournament, the Winter Hawks became the first American team to win the Cup. The Winter Hawks also became the first team in Memorial Cup history to win the championship despite failing to win its own league title—they had been defeated by the Lethbridge Broncos in the WHL playoffs.

The four-team format remains in use, and the host team cycles evenly between all three leagues, with cities submitting bids to their respective leagues, which ultimately choose the host. In 1987, however, only three teams competed for the Memorial Cup. To determine the host team for that tournament, the OHL held a "super series" between its two regular season division winners before the start of the playoffs. The tournament was won by the Oshawa Generals, who went on to win the OHL championship. As a result, the OHL chose to send only Oshawa to the Memorial Cup. Since then, the league runner up is regularly chosen to replace teams either as hosts or if the champion of the league is also hosting. Situations where this arose include in 1988 when Chicoutimi, Quebec and their team, the Chicoutimi Saguenéens, were the hosts, but lost in the first round of the QMJHL playoffs and were replaced as the "host team" by the Drummondville Voltigeurs, which were league runner-ups. The Hamilton Dukes were hosting the tournament in Hamilton, Ontario in 1990, but were a poor team, and were replaced by OHL runner-ups Kitchener Rangers in the tournament. In 1991 the Quebec Remparts were a poor team and despite Quebec City hosting the tournament, they were replaced by QMJHL runner-ups Chicoutimi Saguenéens. In 1995, the Kamloops Blazers qualified as both hosts and WHL champions, and were replaced as the WHL representative by the runner-up Brandon Wheat Kings.

Since the current format was adopted, the Memorial Cup has been won by each league (as of 2026):

- Western Hockey League (WHL): 16 times
- Ontario Hockey League (OHL): 15 times
- Quebec Maritimes Junior Hockey League (QMJHL): 11 times

Cup	Champion	Score	Runner-up	Semifinalist	Fourth place	Host location(s)
1983	Portland Winter Hawks (Host, WHL representative)	8–3	Oshawa Generals (OHL champion)	Verdun Juniors (QMJHL champion)	Lethbridge Broncos (WHL champion)	Portland
1984	Ottawa 67's (OHL champion)	7–2	Kitchener Rangers (Host, OHL representative)	Kamloops Jr. Oilers (WHL champion)	Laval Voisins (QMJHL champion)	Kitchener
1985	Prince Albert Raiders (WHL champion)	6–1	Shawinigan Cataractes (Host, QMJHL representative)	Sault Ste. Marie Greyhounds (OHL champion)	Verdun Junior Canadiens (QMJHL champion)	Shawinigan
1986	Guelph Platers (OHL champion)	6–2	Hull Olympiques (QMJHL champion)	Kamloops Blazers (WHL champion)	Portland Winter Hawks (Host, WHL representative)	Portland
1987	Medicine Hat Tigers (WHL champion)	6–2	Oshawa Generals (Host, OHL champion)	Longueuil Chevaliers (QMJHL champion) ^{[a]}	—	Oshawa
1988	Medicine Hat Tigers (WHL champion)	7–6	Windsor Spitfires (OHL champion)	Hull Olympiques (QMJHL champion)	Drummondville Voltigeurs (QMJHL representative)^{[b]}	Chicoutimi
1989	Swift Current Broncos (WHL champion)	4–3 (OT)	Saskatoon Blades (Host, WHL representative)	Peterborough Petes (OHL champion)	Laval Titan (QMJHL champion)	Saskatoon
1990	Oshawa Generals (OHL champion)	4–3 (OT)	Kitchener Rangers (OHL representative)^{[c]}	Laval Titan (QMJHL champion)	Kamloops Blazers (WHL champion)	Hamilton
1991	Spokane Chiefs (WHL champion)	5–1	Drummondville Voltigeurs (QMJHL representative)^{[d]}	Chicoutimi Saguenéens (QMJHL champion)	Sault Ste. Marie Greyhounds (OHL champion)	Quebec City
1992	Kamloops Blazers (WHL champion)	5–4	Sault Ste. Marie Greyhounds (OHL champion)	Seattle Thunderbirds (Host, WHL representative)	Verdun Collège Français (QMJHL champion)	Seattle
1993	Sault Ste. Marie Greyhounds (Host, OHL representative)^{[e]}	4–2	Peterborough Petes (OHL champion)	Laval Titan (QMJHL champion)	Swift Current Broncos (WHL champion)	Sault Ste. Marie
1994	Kamloops Blazers (WHL champion)	5–3	Laval Titan (Host, QMJHL representative)	Chicoutimi Saguenéens (QMJHL champion)	North Bay Centennials (OHL champion)	Laval
1995	Kamloops Blazers (Host, WHL champion)	8–2	Detroit Junior Red Wings (OHL champion)	Brandon Wheat Kings (WHL representative)	Hull Olympiques (QMJHL champion)	Kamloops
1996	Granby Prédateurs (QMJHL champion)	4–0	Peterborough Petes (Host, OHL champion)	Brandon Wheat Kings (WHL champion)	Guelph Storm (OHL representative)	Peterborough
1997	Hull Olympiques (Host, QMJHL champion)	5–1	Lethbridge Hurricanes (WHL champion)	Oshawa Generals (OHL champion)	Chicoutimi Saguenéens (QMJHL representative)	Hull
1998	Portland Winter Hawks (WHL champion)	4–3 (OT)	Guelph Storm (OHL champion)	Spokane Chiefs (Host, WHL representative)	Val-d'Or Foreurs (QMJHL champion)	Spokane
1999	Ottawa 67's (Host, OHL representative)	7–6 (OT)	Calgary Hitmen (WHL champion)	Belleville Bulls (OHL champion)	Acadie–Bathurst Titan (QMJHL champion)	Ottawa
2000	Rimouski Océanic (QMJHL champion)	6–2	Barrie Colts (OHL champion)	Halifax Mooseheads (Host, QMJHL representative)	Kootenay Ice (WHL champion)	Halifax
2001	Red Deer Rebels (WHL champion)	6–5 (OT)	Val-d'Or Foreurs (QMJHL champion)	Regina Pats (Host, WHL representative)	Ottawa 67's (OHL champion)	Regina
2002	Kootenay Ice (WHL champion)	6–3	Victoriaville Tigres (QMJHL champion)	Erie Otters (OHL champion)	Guelph Storm (Host, OHL representative)	Guelph
2003	Kitchener Rangers (OHL champion)	6–3	Hull Olympiques (QMJHL champion)	Kelowna Rockets (WHL champion)	Quebec Remparts (Host, QMJHL representative)	Quebec City
2004	Kelowna Rockets (Host, WHL representative)	2–1	Gatineau Olympiques (QMJHL champion)	Medicine Hat Tigers (WHL champion)	Guelph Storm (OHL champion)	Kelowna
2005	London Knights (Host, OHL champion)	4–0	Rimouski Océanic (QMJHL champion)	Ottawa 67's (OHL representative)	Kelowna Rockets (WHL champion)	London
2006	Quebec Remparts (QMJHL representative)	6–2	Moncton Wildcats (Host, QMJHL champion)	Vancouver Giants (WHL champion)	Peterborough Petes (OHL champion)	Moncton
2007	Vancouver Giants (Host, WHL representative)	3–1	Medicine Hat Tigers (WHL champion)	Plymouth Whalers (OHL champion)	Lewiston Maineiacs (QMJHL champion)	Vancouver
2008	Spokane Chiefs (WHL champion)	4–1	Kitchener Rangers (Host, OHL champion)	Belleville Bulls (OHL representative)	Gatineau Olympiques (QMJHL champion)	Kitchener
2009	Windsor Spitfires (OHL champion)	4–1	Kelowna Rockets (WHL champion)	Drummondville Voltigeurs (QMJHL champion)	Rimouski Océanic (Host, QMJHL representative)	Rimouski
2010	Windsor Spitfires (OHL champion)	9–1	Brandon Wheat Kings (Host, WHL representative)	Calgary Hitmen (WHL champion)	Moncton Wildcats (QMJHL champion)	Brandon
2011	Saint John Sea Dogs (QMJHL champion)	3–1	Mississauga St. Michael's Majors (Host, OHL representative)	Kootenay Ice (WHL champion)	Owen Sound Attack (OHL champion)	Mississauga
2012	Shawinigan Cataractes (Host, QMJHL representative)	2–1 (OT)	London Knights (OHL champion)	Saint John Sea Dogs (QMJHL champion)	Edmonton Oil Kings (WHL champion)	Shawinigan
2013	Halifax Mooseheads (QMJHL champion)	6–4	Portland Winterhawks (WHL champion)	London Knights (OHL champion)	Saskatoon Blades (Host, WHL representative)	Saskatoon
2014	Edmonton Oil Kings (WHL champion)	6–3	Guelph Storm (OHL champion)	Val-d'Or Foreurs (QMJHL champion)	London Knights (Host, OHL representative)	London
2015	Oshawa Generals (OHL champion)	2–1 (OT)	Kelowna Rockets (WHL champion)	Quebec Remparts (Host, QMJHL representative)	Rimouski Océanic (QMJHL champion)	Quebec City
2016	London Knights (OHL champion)	3–2 (OT)	Rouyn-Noranda Huskies (QMJHL champion)	Red Deer Rebels (Host, WHL representative)	Brandon Wheat Kings (WHL champion)	Red Deer
2017	Windsor Spitfires (Host, OHL representative)	4–3	Erie Otters (OHL champion)	Saint John Sea Dogs (QMJHL champion)	Seattle Thunderbirds (WHL champion)	Windsor
2018	Acadie-Bathurst Titan (QMJHL champion)	3–0	Regina Pats (Host, WHL representative)	Hamilton Bulldogs (OHL champion)	Swift Current Broncos (WHL champion)	Regina
2019	Rouyn-Noranda Huskies (QMJHL champion)	4–2	Halifax Mooseheads (Host, QMJHL representative)	Guelph Storm (OHL champion)	Prince Albert Raiders (WHL champion)	Halifax
2020	Tournament cancelled due to the coronavirus pandemic – Memorial Cup not awarded^{[f]}					
2021	Tournament cancelled due to the coronavirus pandemic – Memorial Cup not awarded^{[g]}					
2022	Saint John Sea Dogs (Host, QMJHL representative)	6–3	Hamilton Bulldogs (OHL champion)	Shawinigan Cataractes (QMJHL champion)	Edmonton Oil Kings (WHL champion)	Saint John
2023	Quebec Remparts (QMJHL champion)	5–0	Seattle Thunderbirds (WHL champion)	Peterborough Petes (OHL champion)	Kamloops Blazers (Host, WHL representative)	Kamloops
2024	Saginaw Spirit (Host, OHL representative)	4–3	London Knights (OHL champion)	Moose Jaw Warriors (WHL champion)	Drummondville Voltigeurs (QMJHL champion)	Saginaw
2025	London Knights (OHL champion)	4–1	Medicine Hat Tigers (WHL champion)	Moncton Wildcats (QMJHL champion)	Rimouski Océanic (Host, QMJHL representative)	Rimouski
2026	Kitchener Rangers (OHL champion)	6–2	Everett Silvertips (WHL champion)	Chicoutimi Saguenéens (QMJHL champion)	Kelowna Rockets (Host, WHL representative)	Kelowna
2027	TBD — Guelph Storm qualified as host					Guelph
2028	TBD — Quebec Remparts qualified as host					Quebec City

== Notes ==
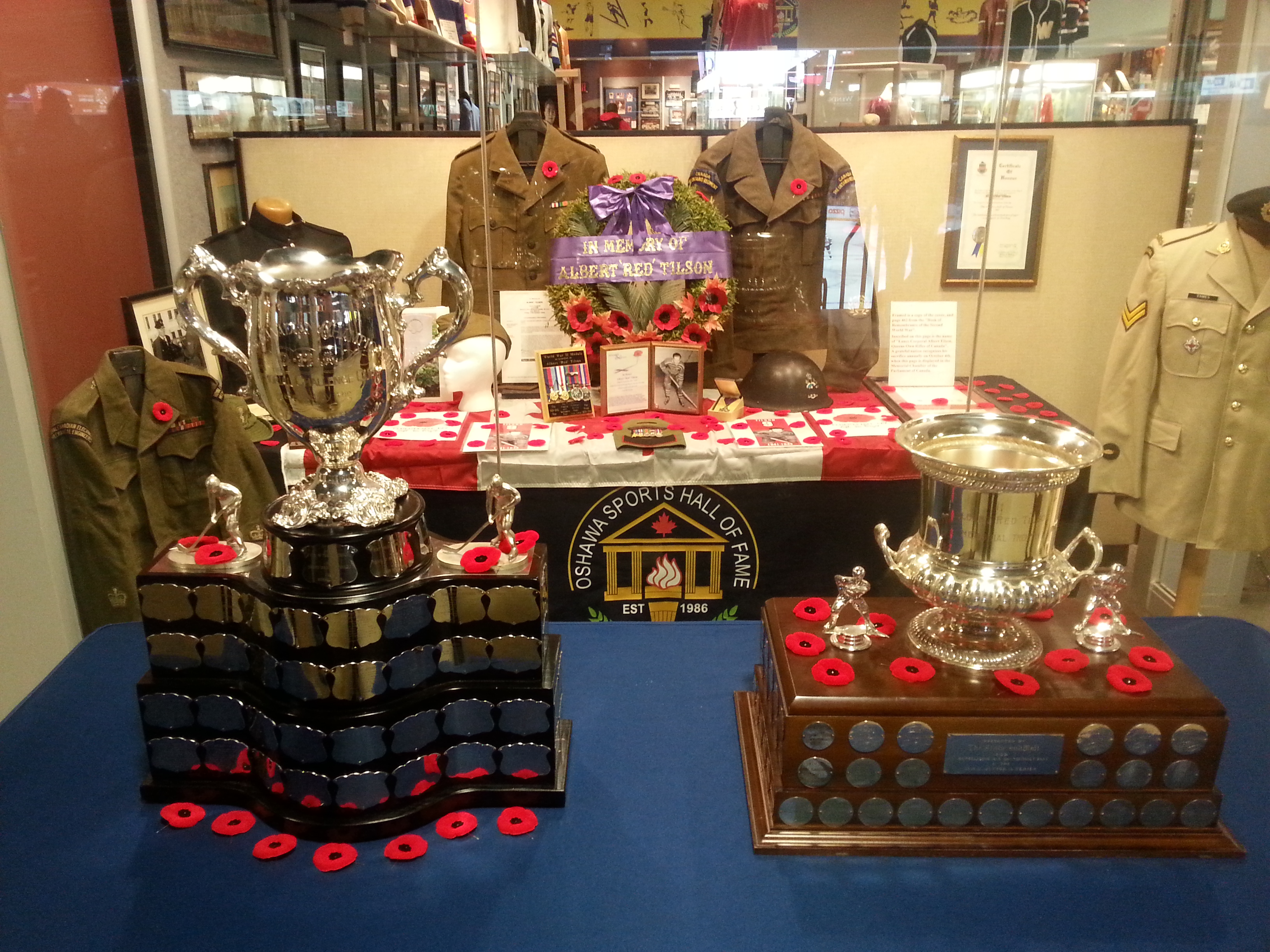
The Memorial Cup and the Red Tilson Trophy displayed at the Oshawa Sports Hall of Fame for Remembrance Day in 2019

^{a} In 1987, the OHL organized a Super Series for the right to host the Memorial Cup tournament between the Leyden Division champions Oshawa Generals, and the Emms Division champions North Bay Centennials. The super series was played before the OHL playoffs commenced. Oshawa defeated North Bay 4 games to 3 for the right to host the Memorial Cup. Oshawa also won the OHL championship series defeating North Bay 4 games to 3. Since Oshawa won both the Super Series and the OHL Championship, only three teams participated in the Memorial Cup.

^{b} The Chicoutimi Saguenéens hosted the 1988 tournament at the Centre Georges-Vézina of Chicoutimi, but were not guaranteed a berth. They were eliminated in the playoffs so the QMJHL sent the Drummondville Voltigeurs, who finished as the championship runners-up, in their place.

^{c} The Dukes of Hamilton hosted the 1990 tournament at Copps Coliseum. However, because of the team's poor standing in the 1989–90 season, the team stepped aside for the OHL championship runners-up, the Kitchener Rangers.

^{d} The Beauport Harfangs hosted the 1991 tournament, however were not guaranteed a berth. The Harfangs were eliminated in the playoffs. The QMJHL championship runners-up Drummondville Voltigeurs were awarded this berth. The Harfangs were based in Beauport, Quebec City, a suburb of Quebec City; however, the tournament was played in the Colisée Pepsi.

^{e} The Sault Ste. Marie Greyhounds won the right to host the 1993 Memorial Cup by defeating the Peterborough Petes 4 games to 0 in a Super Series, much like how Oshawa hosted in 1987. However, the Petes won the OHL championship, thus granting them a spot in the tournament.

^{f} All three leagues suspended play on March 12, 2020, in response to the emerging coronavirus pandemic. On March 23, the CHL cancelled the remainder of the regular season, member league playoffs, and Memorial Cup which the Kelowna Rockets were set to host.

^{g} On April 13, 2021, the CHL announced the cancellation of the Memorial Cup tournament for a second consecutive year due to limitations on travel, border restrictions, and quarantining requirements as a result of the ongoing coronavirus pandemic. The OHL was scheduled to host the 2021 Memorial Cup in either Oshawa or Sault Ste. Marie, Ontario.

== Bibliography ==
- Lapp, Richard; Macaulay, Alec (1997). The Memorial Cup. Harbour Publishing. ISBN 1-55017-170-4.
- "Memorial Cup History". Hockey Hall of Fame.
- Podnieks, Andrew (2005). Silverware. Hockey Hall of Fame. Bolton, Ontario: Fenn Publishing. ISBN 1-55168-296-6.
