= 1950–51 MJHL season =

Manitoba ice hockey season

The 1950–51 Manitoba Junior Hockey League season saw the Winnipeg Monarchs win the league championship.

== Regular season ==
League Standings	GP	W	L	T	Pts	GF	GA
Brandon Wheat Kings	36	26	8	2	54	231	123
Winnipeg Monarchs	36	26	9	1	53	208	128
Winnipeg Black Hawks	36	10	25	1	21	138	249
Winnipeg Canadiens	36	8	28	0	16	129	206

== Playoffs ==
Semi-Final

Monarchs defeated Black Hawks 4-games-to-none

Turnbull Cup Championship

Brandon lost to Monarchs 4-games-to-2

Western Memorial Cup Semi-Final

Monarchs defeated Port Arthur Bruins (TBJHL) 4-games-to-3

Western Memorial Cup Final (Abbott Cup)

Monarchs defeated Regina Pats (WCJHL) 4-games-to-3 with 1 game tied

Memorial Cup Championship

Monarchs lost to Barrie Flyers (OHA) 4-games-to-none

== Awards ==
Trophy	Winner	Team
Scoring Champion	Ron Rohmer	Brandon Wheat Kings
Most Goals	Elliot Chorley	Winnipeg Monarchs

== All-Star teams ==
First All-Star Team
Goaltender	Jim Mattson	Brandon Wheat Kings
Defencemen (3 way tie)	Tom Marshall	Winnipeg Black Hawks
Defencemen (3 way tie)	Bill Burega	Winnipeg Monarchs
Defencemen (3 way tie)	Don Johnston	Winnipeg Monarchs
Centreman	Vic Love	Brandon Wheat Kings
Wingers	Elliot Chorley	Winnipeg Monarchs
Wingers	Ronald Rohmer	Brandon Wheat Kings
Coach	Les Cunningham	Brandon Wheat Kings
Manager	Pat Lyons	Winnipeg Monarchs
Second All-Star Team
Goaltender	Don Dawson	Winnipeg Black Hawks
Defencemen	Dune McLennan	Brandon Wheat Kings
Defencemen	Bill Allison	Brandon Wheat Kings
Centreman	Timmy Young	Brandon Wheat Kings
Wingers	Joe Reichart	Winnipeg Black Hawks
Wingers	Jim Zarie	Winnipeg Monarchs
