= 1931 Memorial Cup =

Canadian junior ice hockey championship

The Memorial Cup trophy

The 1931 Memorial Cup final was the 13th junior ice hockey championship of the Canadian Amateur Hockey Association (CAHA). In 1931, the CAHA began selecting the final venue for the Allan Cup and the Memorial Cup championships a year in advance, instead of deciding only one month in advance.

The George Richardson Memorial Trophy champions Ottawa Primroses of the Ottawa City Junior Hockey League in Eastern Canada competed against the Abbott Cup champions Elmwood Millionaires of the Manitoba Junior Hockey League in Western Canada. In a best-of-three series, held at the Arena Gardens in Toronto, and the Ottawa Auditorium, Elmwood won their first Memorial Cup, defeating Ottawa 2 games to 1.

== Scores ==
- Game 1: Ottawa 2-0 Elmwood (in Toronto)
- Game 2: Elmwood 2-1 Ottawa (in Toronto)
- Game 3: Elmwood 3-0 Ottawa (in Ottawa)

== Winning roster ==
George Brown, Archie Creighton, Spunk Duncanson, John Boyd Johnston, Kitson Massey, Bill MacKenzie, Gordie MacKenzie, Duke McDonald, Art Rice, Cliff Workman, Norm Yellowlees. Coach: Jack Hughes
