= Manitoba Hockey Hall of Fame =

Ice hockey hall of fame and museum

Coordinates: 49.8931°N 97.1438°W

The Manitoba Hockey Hall of Fame and Museum is a hall of fame and museum for ice hockey in Manitoba, located on the main level of the Canada Life Centre in downtown Winnipeg.

It was established in 1985, when the first honoured members were named and plaques were erected in their honour. The first group of inductees was large in order to recognize the accomplishments of Manitoba players, coaches, builders, and teams at the international, national, provincial, and local levels for many years. Induction ceremonies were held on an annual or bi-annual basis through 1993. Since 1995, the Foundation has added to its honour-roll every second year.

The Players Wall is just inside the main entrance in the northeast corner and the Builders Wall is in the northwest corner. A Wall of Champions for teams in the Hall of Fame is located opposite the Builders Wall. The museum also includes a tribute to Olympic gold medallists and an enclosed memorabilia area. Until it was relocated to the MTS Centre (now Canada Life Centre) in late 2004, the Manitoba Hockey Hall of Fame and Museum was housed in the Winnipeg Arena. The Foundation also maintains a Wall of Fame photo gallery in the Canad Inns Polo Park in Winnipeg.

== All-Star teams ==
In 2000, the Manitoba Hockey Foundation recognized a century of hockey excellence in Manitoba, with its announcement of its Manitoba Hockey Hall of Fame All-Star Teams - the "Best".

1st All-Star Team

- Goal - Terry Sawchuk
- Defence - Babe Pratt, Jack Stewart
- Forwards - Andy Bathgate, Bobby Clarke, Bill Mosienko
- Coach - Dick Irvin

2nd All-Star Team

- Goal - Chuck Gardiner
- Defence - Ching Johnson, Ken Reardon
- Forwards - Frank Fredrickson, Bryan Hextall, Reg Leach
- Coach - Billy Reay

Player of the Century
Terry Sawchuk
Coach of the Century
Dick Irvin
Referee of the Century
Andy Van Hellemond

== Players ==
=== A-D ===
A

- Reg Abbott
- Gary Aldcorn
- Jack Armytage
- Chuck Arnason

B

- Dan Bain
- Murray Balagus
- Doug Baldwin
- Terry Ball
- Murray Bannerman
- Andy Bathgate
- Paul Baxter
- Ed Belfour
- Gordon Bell
- Joe Bell
- Lin Bend
- Bill Benson
- Gary Bergman
- Andy Blair
- Rick Blight
- Larry Bolonchuk
- Dan Bonar
- Laurie Boschman
- Jennifer Botterill
- Ralph Bowman
- Jack Bownass
- Wally Boyer
- Darren Boyko
- Andy Branigan
- Billy Breen
- Turk Broda
- Cecil Browne
- Ray Brunel
- Ed Bruneteau
- Mud Bruneteau
- Walter Byron

C

- Randy Carlyle
- Bruce Carmichael
- Art Chapman
- Ron Chipperfield
- Elliot Chorley
- Bob Chrystal
- Bobby Clarke
- Cam Connor
- William Cockburn
- Joe Cooper
- Art Coulter
- Rosario Couture
- Joe Crozier
- Wilf Cude

D

- Joe Daley
- Bill Derlago
- Ernie Dickens
- Jordy Douglas
- Tom Dunderdale
- Fred Dunsmore
- Red Dutton

=== E-K ===
E

- Brian Engblom
- Dean Evason
- Bill Ezinicki

F

- Bill Fairbairn
- Pat Falloon
- Gord Fashoway
- Wilf Field
- Bob Fitchner
- Rod Flett
- Marcel Flett
- Mike Ford
- Jimmy Foster
- Bill Fraser
- Frank Fredrickson
- Karl Friesen
- Theo Fleury

G

- Chuck Gardiner
- Herb Gardiner
- Cal Gardner
- Curt Giles
- Randy Gilhen
- Billy Gooden
- Magnus Goodman
- Paul Goodman
- Butch Goring
- Ted Green

H

- Halldor Halldorson
- Joe Hall
- Al Hamilton
- Ted Hampson
- Glen Hanlon
- Glen Harmon
- Ted Harris
- Gerry Hart
- Dale Hawerchuk
- George Hay
- Andy Hebenton
- Anders Hedberg
- Bill Heindl Sr.
- Jim Henry
- Phil Hergesheimer
- Wally Hergesheimer
- Bryan Hextall
- Bryan Hextall Jr.
- Dennis Hextall
- Ron Hextall
- Mel Hill
- Cecil Hoekstra
- Ed Hoekstra
- Barney Holden
- Howie Hughes
- Jack Hughes
- Bobby Hull

I

- Dick Irvin
- Ted Irvine

J

- Gerry James
- Ching Johnson
- Dan Johnson
- Jim Johnson
- Tom Johnson
- Bill Juzda

K

- Robert Kabel
- Pete Kapusta
- Vaughn Karpan
- Mike Keane
- Mickey Keating
- Pete Kelly
- Bill Kendall
- Sheldon Kennedy
- Trevor Kidd
- Neil Komadoski
- George Konik
- Dick Kowcinak
- Arnie Kullman
- Ed Kullman

=== L-Q ===
L

- Gord Labossiere
- Gord Lane
- Pete Langelle
- Wayne Larkin
- Reggie Leach
- Grant Ledyard
- Butch Lee
- Chuck Lefley
- Bob Leiter
- Bill Lesuk
- Victor Lindquist
- Clem Loughlin
- Ron Low

M

- Bill MacKenzie
- Ray Manson
- John Marks
- Bill Masterton
- Fred Maxwell
- Eddie Mazur
- Dunc McCallum
- Kevin McCarthy
- John McCreedy
- Ab McDonald
- Jim McFadden
- William Meronek
- Nick Mickoski
- Bill Mikkelson
- Perry Miller
- Walter Monson
- Jay More
- John Morrison
- Lew Morrison
- Bill Mosienko
- Harry Mummery
- Murray Murdoch
- Bill Murray
- Marty Murray

N

- Eric Nesterenko
- Ray Neufeld
- Ulf Nilsson
- Baldy Northcott

O

- Chris Oddleifson
- Harry Oliver

P

- Ross Parke
- James Patrick
- Steve Patrick
- Mitch Pechet
- Cliff Pennington
- Alf Pike
- Paul Platz
- Babe Pratt

=== R-Z ===
R

- Bill Ranford
- Don Raleigh
- Chuck Rayner
- Ken Reardon
- Terry Reardon
- Billy Reay
- Tom Rendall
- Art Rice-Jones
- Curt Ridley
- Mike Ridley
- Gus Rivers
- Romeo Rivers
- Bill Robinson
- Duane Rupp
- Church Russell
- Jack Ruttan

S

- Billy Saunders
- Terry Sawchuk
- Chuck Scherza
- Dave Semenko
- Johnny Sheppard
- Fred Shero
- Alex Shibicky
- Gord Simpson
- Joe Simpson
- Lars Sjoberg
- Ed Slowinski
- Dallas Smith
- Art Somers
- Wally Stanowski
- Thomas Steen
- Pete Stemkowski
- Wayne Stephenson
- Jack Stewart
- Blaine Stoughton
- Art Stratton
- Gordon Stratton
- Danny Summers
- Bill Sutherland

T

- Harry Taylor
- Ted Taylor
- Jimmy Thomson
- Len Thornson
- Del Topoll

W

- Ernie Wakely
- Nick Wasnie
- Bill Watson
- Blake Watson
- Murray Wilkie
- Neil Wilkinson
- Carey Wilson
- Cully Wilson
- Steve Witiuk
- Bob Woytowich
- Ken Wregget

Y

- Terry Yake
- Mike Yaschuk
- Norm Yellowlees
- Susana Yuen

Z

- Chick Zamick
- Bruno Zarrillo

== Builders ==
- William Addison
- Aime Allaire
- George Allard
- Bill Allum
- Edward Armstrong
- Don Baizley
- Denis Ball
- Addie Bell
- J.P. Bend
- Barry Bonni
- Ralph Borger
- Jack Bourke
- Abbie Coo
- Bob Cornell
- Wayne Chernecki
- Fred Creighton
- Gary Cribbs
- Mike Daski
- R.H. Davie
- Earl Dawson
- Larry Desjardins
- Don Dietrich
- Jimmy Dunn
- Heavy Evason
- R.A. Fabro
- Russ Farrell
- Noel Filbey
- Wayne Fleming
- Ted Foreman
- Harry Foxton
- Ray Frost
- E. A. Gilroy
- Pat Ginnell
- Michael Gobuty
- Jackie Gordon
- Al Hares
- Ben Hatskin
- Steve Hawrysh
- Ian Heather
- Ernie Hildebrand
- Terry Hind
- Vic Johnson
- William Johnston
- Robert Kirk
- Mike Kryschuk
- Greg Lacomy
- Glen Lawson
- Al Leader
- Vince Leah
- Bryan Lefley
- Pat Lyon
- Don Mackenzie
- Bill Maluta
- Jimm Mann
- Fred Marples
- Cal Marvins
- Frank Mathers
- Joe Mathewson
- Jill Mathez
- Kelly McCrimmon
- Dennis McDonald
- Frank McKinnon
- Jake Milford
- Tom Miller
- Morris Mott
- Andy Mulligan
- Andy Murray
- Harry Neil
- Horace Nicholson
- John Paddock
- Gord Pennell
- Jack Perrin
- Max Pilous
- Rudy Pilous
- Claude C. Robinson
- Lawrence Russell
- Gladwyn Scott
- Barry Shenkarow
- Robert Simpson
- Clark Simpson
- Jimmy Skinner
- Bruce Southern
- Sam Southern
- Sam Tascona
- Dr. W. F. Taylor
- Ken Tibbatts
- Al Tresoor
- Dr. Jack Waugh
- Murray Williamson
- Dianne Woods

== Officials ==
- Perry Allan
- Hyland Beatty
- Ted Blondal
- Dick Davis
- Andy Gurba
- Rob Haithwaite
- Alex Irvin
- Lou Joyal
- Gord Kerr
- Danny Kurdydyk
- Don Kuryk
- Laura Loeppky
- Lorne Lyndon
- Rob Martell
- Almer McKerlie
- Morley Meyers
- Lloyd Orchard
- William Earl Ormshaw
- Allan Paradice
- Ed Sweeney
- Bob Thompson
- Bud Ulrich
- Gerry Varnes
- Andy Van Hellemond
- Joe Vinet

== Media ==
- Arthur Carlyon Allan
- Dallis Beck
- Mo Cartman
- Jim Coleman
- Howard Crawford
- Reyn Davis
- Edward Dearden
- Trent Frayne
- Vic Grant
- Bob Holliday
- Curt Keilback
- Jack Matheson
- Ken McKenzie
- Stewart McPherson
- Kelly Moore
- Ken Nicolson
- Scott Oake
- Bob Picken
- Hal Sigurdson
- Maurice Smith
- Jack Wells
- Don Wittman
- Scott Young

== Teams ==
=== Stanley Cup Champions ===
- 1896 Winnipeg Victorias
- 1901 Winnipeg Victorias

=== Olympic Champions ===
- 1920 Winnipeg Falcons
- 1932 Winnipeg Hockey Club

=== IIHF World Champions ===
- 1931 University of Manitoba Grads
- 1935 Winnipeg Monarchs

=== Avco Cup Champions ===
- 1976 Winnipeg Jets
- 1978 Winnipeg Jets
- 1979 Winnipeg Jets

=== Edinburgh Cup Champions ===
- 1956 Winnipeg Warriors

=== Canadian University Champions ===
- 1965 University of Manitoba

=== Allan Cup Champions ===
- 1911 Winnipeg Victorias
- 1912 Winnipeg Victorias
- 1913 Winnipeg Hockey Club
- 1915 Winnipeg Monarchs
- 1916 Winnipeg 61st Battalion
- 1920 Winnipeg Falcons
- 1923 University of Manitoba Junior Hockey Club
- 1932 Winnipeg Hockey Club
- 1928 University of Manitoba Varsity Hockey Club
- 1964 Winnipeg Maroons
- 1994 Warroad Lakers
- 1995 Warroad Lakers
- 1996 Warroad Lakers
- 2003 Île-des-Chênes North Stars

=== Edmonton Journal Trophy Winners ===
- 1952 Dauphin Kings
- 1955 Brandon Wheat Kings
- 1957 Pine Falls Paper Kings
- 1964 Warroad Lakers
- 1966 Flin Flon Warriors

=== Hardy Cup Champions ===
- 1974 Warroad Lakers
- 1983 Winnipeg North End Flyers

=== Memorial Cup Champions ===
- 1921 Winnipeg Junior Falcons
- 1923 University of Manitoba Junior Hockey Club
- 1931 Elmwood Millionaires
- 1935 Winnipeg Monarchs
- 1937 Winnipeg Monarchs
- 1938 St. Boniface Seals
- 1941 Winnipeg Rangers
- 1942 Portage Terriers
- 1943 Winnipeg Rangers
- 1946 Winnipeg Monarchs
- 1957 Flin Flon Bombers
- 1959 Winnipeg Braves

=== Centennial Cup Champions ===
- 1973 Portage Terriers
- 1974 Selkirk Steelers

=== Abbott Cup Champions ===
- 1921 Winnipeg Junior Falcons
- 1923 University of Manitoba Junior Hockey Club
- 1929 Elmwood Millionaires
- 1931 Elmwood Millionaires
- 1932 Winnipeg Monarchs
- 1937 Winnipeg Monarchs
- 1938 St. Boniface Seals
- 1940 Kenora Thistles
- 1941 Winnipeg Rangers
- 1942 Portage Terriers
- 1943 Winnipeg Rangers
- 1946 Winnipeg Monarchs
- 1949 Brandon Wheat Kings
- 1951 Winnipeg Monarchs
- 1953 St. Boniface Canadiens
- 1957 Flin Flon Bombers
- 1959 Winnipeg Braves
- 1973 Portage Terriers
- 1974 Selkirk Steelers
- 1995 Winnipeg South Blues

== See also ==
- Manitoba Sports Hall of Fame and Museum
- Hockey Hall of Fame
