= 1951–52 MJHL season =

Manitoba ice hockey season

The 1951–52 Manitoba Junior Hockey League season

== League notes ==
The Winnipeg Canadiens were bought and renamed the St. Boniface Canadiens.

== Regular season ==
| League Standings | GP | W | L | T | Pts | GF | GA |
|---|---|---|---|---|---|---|---|
| Winnipeg Monarchs | 36 | 26 | 10 | 0 | 52 | 155 | 111 |
| Brandon Wheat Kings | 36 | 21 | 14 | 1 | 43 | 160 | 144 |
| St. Boniface Canadiens | 36 | 18 | 17 | 1 | 37 | 131 | 112 |
| Winnipeg Black Hawks | 36 | 6 | 30 | 0 | 12 | 123 | 202 |

== Playoffs ==
Semi-Final

Brandon defeated St. Boniface 4-games-to-1

Turnbull Cup Championship

Monarchs defeated Brandon 4-games-to-2

Western Memorial Cup Semi-Final

Monarchs lost to Fort William Hurricanes (TBJHL) 3-games-to-1 with 2 games tied

== Awards ==
| Trophy | Winner | Team |
|---|---|---|
| Scoring Champion | Del Topoll | Brandon Wheat Kings |
| Most Goals | Ken Smith | Winnipeg Black Hawks |

== All-Star teams ==
First All-Star Team
| Goaltender | Don Dawson | Winnipeg Black Hawks |
| Defencemen | Phil Hilton | Brandon Wheat Kings |
| Defencemen | Don Johnston | Winnipeg Monarchs |
| Centreman | Del Topoll | Brandon Wheat Kings |
| Wingers | Murray Wilkie | Brandon Wheat Kings |
| Wingers | Ken Smith | Winnipeg Black Hawks |
| Coach | Riley Mullen | Brandon Wheat Kings |
| Manager | Pat Lyons | Winnipeg Monarchs |
Second All-Star Team
| Goaltender | Don Collins | Winnipeg Monarchs |
| Defencemen | Frank Arnett | Brandon Wheat Kings |
| Defencemen | Syd White | St. Boniface Canadiens |
| Centreman | Jim Zarie | Winnipeg Monarchs |
| Wingers | Joe Reichart | Winnipeg Black Hawks |
| Wingers | Bill Maslanko | Brandon Wheat Kings |
