= Bill Burega =

Canadian ice hockey player (1932–2020)

- Born: March 13, 1932 Winnipeg, Manitoba, Canada
- Died: August 23, 2020 (aged 88) Kingston, Ontario, Canada
- Height: 6 ft 1 in (185 cm)
- Weight: 203 lb (92 kg; 14 st 7 lb)
- Position: Defenceman
- Shot: Left
- Played for: Toronto Maple Leafs
- Playing career: 1952–1970

William Burega (March 13, 1932 – August 23, 2020) was a Canadian professional ice hockey defenceman who played four games in the National Hockey League with the Toronto Maple Leafs during the 1955–56 season. The rest of his career, which lasted from 1952 to 1970, was spent in the minor leagues.

== Career statistics ==
=== Regular season and playoffs ===
			Regular season					Playoffs
Season	Team	League	GP	G	A	Pts	PIM	GP	G	A	Pts	PIM
1949–50	Winnipeg Monarchs	MJHL	28	3	2	5	45	12	0	4	4	16
1949–50	Winnipeg Monarchs	M-Cup	—	—	—	—	—	19	2	3	5	52
1950–51	Winnipeg Monarchs	MJHL	36	10	11	21	59	10	1	3	4	27
1950–51	Winnipeg Monarchs	M-Cup	—	—	—	—	—	10	2	3	5	52
1951–52	Winnipeg Canadians	MJHL	36	4	8	12	111	5	1	1	2	17
1951–52	Winnipeg Canadians	M-Cup	—	—	—	—	—	6	0	0	0	16
1952–53	Glace Bay Miners	MMHL	72	6	10	16	163	8	0	1	1	16
1953–54	Pittsburgh Hornets	AHL	5	0	1	1	4	—	—	—	—	—
1953–54	Quebec Aces	QSHL	41	0	5	5	115	7	0	0	0	0
1954–55	Pittsburgh Hornets	AHL	57	2	5	7	140	10	0	2	2	24
1955–56	Toronto Maple Leafs	NHL	4	0	1	1	4	—	—	—	—	—
1956–57	Winnipeg Warriors	WHL	70	1	14	15	197	—	—	—	—	—
1957–58	Buffalo Bisons	AHL	56	0	7	7	136	—	—	—	—	—
1958–59	Saskatoon Quakers	WHL	62	2	10	12	104	—	—	—	—	—
1959–60	Sault Thunderbirds	EPHL	2	0	0	0	6	—	—	—	—	—
1959–60	Spokane Comets	WHL	65	4	14	18	162	—	—	—	—	—
1960–61	Calgary Stampeders	WHL	67	3	32	35	73	5	1	1	2	6
1961–62	Los Angeles Blades	WHL	70	1	14	15	142	—	—	—	—	—
1962–63	Los Angeles Blades	WHL	70	1	11	12	142	3	0	2	2	6
1963–64	Los Angeles Blades	WHL	51	0	7	7	75	12	0	3	3	31
1964–65	Vancouver Canucks	WHL	70	3	10	13	161	5	0	1	1	10
1965–66	Kingston Aces	OHA Sr	12	1	10	11	49	11	1	6	7	14
1965–66	Guelph Regals	Al-Cup	—	—	—	—	—	69	1	7	8	24
1966–67	Kingston Aces	OHA Sr	38	4	19	23	84	—	—	—	—	—
1967–68	Kingston Aces	OHA Sr	40	1	14	15	86	—	—	—	—	—
1968–69	Kingston Aces	OHA Sr	1	0	0	0	6	—	—	—	—	—
1969–70	Kingston Aces	OHA Sr	25	1	9	10	61	—	—	—	—	—
WHL totals			525	15	112	127	1056	25	1	7	8	53
NHL totals			4	0	1	1	4	—	—	—	—	—

== Awards and achievements ==
- MJHL First All-Star Team (1951)
- Calder Cup (AHL) Championship (1955)
- WHL Championship (1956)
- OHA Sr First All-Star Team (1967)
- OHA Sr Second All-Star Team (1970)
