= Elmwood Millionaires =

Canadian amateur ice hockey team

The Elmwood Millionaires were a Canadian Junior Hockey team in the Manitoba Junior Hockey League. The Millionaires, based in Elmwood, Manitoba, won five consecutive straight Turnbull Cup Championships as Manitoba Junior ‘A’ Champions, 1927, 1928, 1929, 1930 and 1931, and a sixth in 1936. The 1929 Elmwood Millionaires won the Abbott Cup as western Canadian junior hockey champions. They went on to lose the Memorial Cup to the Toronto Marlboros. The 1931 Elmwood Millionaires defied the odds as they won both the Abbott Cup as Western Champions and the Memorial Cup as national junior champions even though they were heavy underdogs. The moniker was also used to describe the 1970s and 1980s senior team playing in the Canadian Amateur Senior Hockey League as the EK/Elmwood Millionaires.

Roster: Duke McDonald, Cliff Workman, Gordie McKenzie, Boyd Johnson, "Spunk" Duncanson, and Earl Adam (Manager), George Brown, Kitson Massey, Art Rice-Jones, Bill MacKenzie (Captain), Norm Yellowlees, Archie Creighton, Jack Hughes (Coach).

The 1921 and 1931 Elmwood Millionaires were inducted into the Manitoba Hockey Hall of Fame in the team category.

== Championships ==
1931 Memorial Cup Champions

== National Hockey League alumni ==
The following players went on to play in the National Hockey League professional league.

- George Brown
- Bill Kendall
- Bobby Kirk
- Bill MacKenzie
- Sam McAdam
- Babe Pratt
- Gus Rivers
- Joe Shack
