= Mike Yaschuk =

Canadian ice hockey player and coach (1922–2020)

- Born: November 5, 1922 Ituna, Saskatchewan, Canada
- Died: August 7, 2020 (aged 97)
- Height: 5 ft 7 in (170 cm)
- Weight: 162 lb (73 kg; 11 st 8 lb)
- Position: Right wing
- Shot: right
- Played for: Winnipeg Reo Flyers; Saskatoon Quakers; Streatham Redhawks; Letellier Maple Leafs
- Playing career: 1946–1951

Mike Yaschuk (November 5, 1922 – August 7, 2020) was a Canadian ice hockey player and coach. He played professionally in senior leagues in Canada and in the English League. After playing, he coached in Manitoba. He was a member of the Manitoba Hockey Hall of Fame.

Yaschuk was born in Ituna, Saskatchewan. He played junior with the St. Boniface Athletics and was the MJHL leading scorer in 1942–43. He enlisted in the Canadian Navy for World War II. When he returned, Yaschuk played senior ice hockey with the Winnipeg Reo Flyers from 1946 to 1948. He played one season with the Saskatoon Quakers of the Western Canada Senior Hockey League in 1948–49, then moved to England. In England, he played one season with the Streatham Redhawks, the English National League champions of 1950. He returned to Canada and played one further season of senior, playing some games for the Letellier Maple Leafs before retiring.

After his playing career, Yaschuk coached midget and juvenile teams at Norwood Falcon C.C. for 12 years and co-founded and coached the St. Boniface Mohawks in the Manitoba Senior League.

Yaschuk died on August 7, 2020, aged 97.

== Awards and achievements ==
- MJHL Scoring Champion (1943)
- "Honoured Member" of the Manitoba Hockey Hall of Fame
