= 1938 Memorial Cup =

Canadian junior ice hockey championship

The Memorial Cup trophy

The 1938 Memorial Cup final was the 20th junior ice hockey championship of the Canadian Amateur Hockey Association. The George Richardson Memorial Trophy champions Oshawa Generals of the Ontario Hockey Association in Eastern Canada competed against the Abbott Cup champions St. Boniface Seals of the Manitoba Junior Hockey League in Western Canada. In a best-of-five series, held at Maple Leaf Gardens in Toronto, Ontario, St. Boniface won their 1st Memorial Cup, defeating Oshawa 3 games to 2.

The underdog Seals upset all their western challengers and went to Toronto's Maple Leaf Gardens to play the four-to-one favourites, the Oshawa Generals, for the Cup. In the first game, St. Boniface protested the length of Oshawa's sticks, and after two inches had been lopped off a bunch, the Generals still won 3–2.

St. Boniface came up with a 7–1 win in the final, in front of 15,617 spectators — at the time the largest crowd to have watched a Canadian hockey game.

== Scores ==
- Game 1: Oshawa 3-2 St. Boniface
- Game 2: St. Boniface 4-0 Oshawa
- Game 3: Oshawa 4-2 St. Boniface
- Game 4: St. Boniface 6-4 Oshawa
- Game 5: St. Boniface 7-1 Oshawa

== Winning roster ==
Herb Burron, Patch Courture, George Gordon, Herm Gruhm, Garfield Peters, Bert Janke, Jack Messett, Billy McGregor, Frank Nickol, Billy Reay, Jack Simpson, Wally Stanowski, Doug Webb. Coach: Mike Kryschuk
