= James Foster (ice hockey) =

Scottish-Canadian ice hockey player (1905–1969)

- Born: September 13, 1905 Glasgow, Scotland
- Died: January 4, 1969 (aged 64) Winnipeg, Manitoba, Canada
- Position: Goaltender
- Played for: Winnipeg Winnipegs; University of Manitoba; Elmwood Millionaires; Moncton Hawks; Great Britain; Harringay Greyhounds; Quebec Aces
- National team: Great Britain

James John Foster (September 13, 1905 – January 4, 1969) was a Scottish-Canadian ice hockey goaltender. He is best known for his role in leading Great Britain men's national ice hockey team to its only gold medal, in ice hockey at the 1936 Winter Olympics. He was posthumously inducted into the IIHF Hall of Fame in 2023.

== Early life ==
Born in Glasgow, Foster emigrated to Winnipeg, Manitoba in 1912. Foster first rose to prominence as a hockey player in the Winnipeg Junior Hockey League in the early 1920s. With the Winnipeg Argonauts, and later the University of Manitoba, Foster earned a reputation as "the world's finest goaltender." His team won the Manitoba Junior Provincial Championship in 1925. He was a two-time winner of the Manitoba Championship, first in 1927 with the Winnipeg Winnipegs and in 1930 with the Elmwood Millionaires. Around this time, he suffered a broken leg and had to briefly leave hockey. In 1931, he joined the Moncton Hawks of the Maritime Senior Hockey League, a team he led to the Allan Cup finals in 1932. Foster went an astounding 417 minutes without allowing a goal. He also led the Hawks to victories in the Allan Cup in 1933 and 1934, and during his three seasons with the team, he missed only one game.

== Career ==
=== Return to Britain ===
In 1935, along with the coach of the Moncton Hawks and Foster's longtime mentor, Percy Nicklin, Foster moved to London to play for the Richmond Hawks. He was selected to the All-Star team, and his new Hawks finished in a tie for first in the league. The Canadian Amateur Hockey Association suspended Foster and teammate Alexander Archer for "leaving the dominion without permission" to play in England. The International Ice Hockey Federation upheld the decision and the pair were only cleared to play in the Olympics when the Canadians waived the suspensions for the duration of the games.

=== 1936 Olympic Games ===
Olympic medal record

Men's Ice Hockey
Gold medal – first place	1936 Garmisch-Partenkirchen	Team

In ice hockey at the 1936 Winter Olympics, Foster represented Great Britain in ice hockey. Foster, along with eight other British born players who had learned their hockey in Canada, a Canadian born British resident and two British natives, helped to lead Great Britain to its first and only Olympic gold medal in ice hockey, narrowly beating out Canada. In seven games, Foster allowed only three goals, recording four shutouts. Foster was allowed to play in the Olympics when Canadian Amateur Hockey Association president E. A. Gilroy chose not to enforce a suspension on the eve of the Olympics as a gesture of sportsmanship towards Great Britain.

=== Later career ===
In the years following the 1936 Olympics, Foster continued to represent Great Britain in international competition, leading the nation to back-to-back European Championships in 1937 and 1938. After playing a season with the Harringay Greyhounds, Foster returned to Canada in 1940 to work in an aircraft factory. He later played for the Glace Bay Miners and the Quebec Aces. He was inducted into the British Ice Hockey Hall of Fame in 1950. As he once thought of entering the Church, he was nicknamed "The Parson".

== Awards and achievements ==
- Turnbull Cup (MJHL) Championship (1925)
- Allan Cup Championships (1933 & 1934)
- Inducted into the British Ice Hockey Hall of Fame in 1950
- "Honoured Member" of the Manitoba Hockey Hall of Fame
- Inducted into the IIHF Hall of Fame in 2023
