= Andy Branigan =

Canadian ice hockey player (1922–1995)

- Born: April 11, 1922; Winnipeg, Manitoba, Canada
- Died: April 13, 1995 (aged 73); Providence, Rhode Island, US
- Height: 5 ft 11 in (180 cm)
- Weight: 190 lb (86 kg; 13 st 8 lb)
- Position: Defence
- Shot: Left
- Played for: New York Americans; Brooklyn Americans
- Playing career: 1940–1960

Andrew John Branigan (April 11, 1922 — April 13, 1995) was a Canadian ice hockey player who played for 27 games for the New York Americans and Brooklyn Americans in the NHL between 1940 and 1942. The rest of his career, which lasted from 1940 to 1960, was mainly spent in the minor American Hockey League.

== Biography ==
Branigan was born in Winnipeg, Manitoba, and began his career as a defenceman playing with the Winnipeg Monarchs of the Manitoba Junior Hockey League from 1939–1940. In October 1940, he was signed by the New York/Brooklyn Americans of the NHL and played for the team from 1940–1942.

While serving in World War II, he played for the Winnipeg RCAF Bombers. He also played several seasons with the AHL, playing for the Indianapolis Capitols, Hershey Bears and the Providence Reds.

He finished his playing career in the Eastern Hockey League in 1960 playing for the Washington Presidents and the New York Rovers. Branigan also coached the Washington Presidents and the New York Rovers from 1958–1960.

He died on April 13, 1995, in Providence, Rhode Island, and is interred in Swan Point Cemetery in Providence.

== Career statistics ==
=== Regular season and playoffs ===
			Regular season					Playoffs
Season	Team	League	GP	G	A	Pts	PIM	GP	G	A	Pts	PIM
1938–39	East Kildonan Bisons	MAHA	—	—	—	—	—	—	—	—	—	—
1939–40	Winnipeg Monarchs	MJHL	23	0	1	1	38	7	5	0	5	14
1940–41	New York Americans	NHL	6	1	0	1	5	—	—	—	—	—
1940–41	Springfield Indians	AHL	50	2	6	8	21	3	0	0	0	4
1941–42	Brooklyn Americans	NHL	21	0	2	2	26	—	—	—	—	—
1941–42	Springfield Indians	AHL	1	0	0	0	0	—	—	—	—	—
1942–43	Winnipeg RCAF	WNDHL	13	4	1	5	26	5	1	0	1	18
1942–43	Winnipeg RCAF	Al-Cup	—	—	—	—	—	12	3	3	6	20
1943–44	Winnipeg RCAF	WNDHL	1	0	1	1	6	—	—	—	—	—
1944–45	Winnipeg RCAF	WNDHL	9	2	1	3	18	—	—	—	—	—
1944–45	Rockcliffe RCAF	OCHL	4	0	2	2	8	—	—	—	—	—
1945–46	Indianapolis Capitals	AHL	62	4	17	21	71	5	0	1	1	0
1946–47	Hershey Bears	AHL	62	6	9	15	42	11	1	2	3	8
1947–48	Hershey Bears	AHL	63	1	11	12	91	2	0	0	0	6
1948–49	Hershey Bears	AHL	68	5	14	19	54	11	0	2	2	10
1949–50	Hershey Bears	AHL	66	1	15	16	73	—	—	—	—	—
1950–51	Hershey Bears	AHL	64	6	9	15	114	6	0	0	0	8
1951–52	Hershey Bears	AHL	66	6	19	25	110	5	1	1	2	10
1952–53	Hershey Bears	AHL	51	5	4	9	71	—	—	—	—	—
1953–54	Hershey Bears	AHL	68	3	22	25	124	11	0	1	1	10
1954–55	Providence Reds	AHL	61	2	12	14	114	—	—	—	—	—
1955–56	Providence Reds	AHL	64	5	17	22	103	9	2	5	7	14
1956–57	Providence Reds	AHL	46	2	10	12	46	5	0	0	0	6
1957–58	Providence Reds	AHL	67	2	6	8	61	1	0	0	0	0
1958–59	Washington Presidents	EHL	63	5	16	21	82	—	—	—	—	—
1959–60	New York Rovers	EHL	48	2	10	12	73	—	—	—	—	—
AHL totals			859	50	171	221	1095	69	4	12	16	70
NHL totals			27	1	2	3	31	—	—	—	—	—

== Awards and achievements ==
- Calder Cup AHL Championships (1947 & 1956)
- AHL Second Team All-Star (1956)
- Honoured Member of the Manitoba Hockey Hall of Fame
