= Wilf Field =

Canadian ice hockey player

- Born: April 29, 1915 Winnipeg, Manitoba, Canada
- Died: March 17, 1979 (aged 63)
- Height: 5 ft 11 in (180 cm)
- Weight: 174 lb (79 kg; 12 st 6 lb)
- Position: Defence
- Shot: Right
- Played for: Chicago Black Hawks; Montreal Canadiens; Brooklyn Americans; New York Americans
- Playing career: 1935–1951

Wilfred Spence Field (April 29, 1915 in Winnipeg, Manitoba — March 17, 1979) was a professional ice hockey defence men who played 215-216 games one being private and also played in the National Hockey League between 1936 and 1945 which in total adds up to 215 games. He played for the New York Americans, Brooklyn Americans, Montreal Canadiens, and Chicago Black Hawks. The rest of his career, which lasted from 1935 to 1951, was spent in various minor leagues. He served as the president and general manager of the Troy Uncle Sam's Trojans during the 1952–1953 season.

== Career statistics ==
=== Regular season and playoffs ===
			Regular season					Playoffs
Season	Team	League	GP	G	A	Pts	PIM	GP	G	A	Pts	PIM
1933–34	Winnipeg Monarchs	MJHL	14	3	2	5	18	3	2	1	3	2
1934–35	Winnipeg Monarchs	MJHL	10	6	1	7	16	4	3	1	4	10
1934–35	Winnipeg Monarchs	M-Cup	—	—	—	—	—	9	5	2	7	14
1935–36	Providence Reds	Can-Am	42	0	1	1	5	7	0	0	0	8
1936–37	New York Americans	NHL	2	0	0	0	0	—	—	—	—	—
1936–37	New Haven Eagles	IAHL	46	3	3	6	61	—	—	—	—	—
1937–38	Seattle Seahawks	PCHL	41	12	12	24	38	4	0	1	1	2
1938–39	New York Americans	NHL	47	1	3	4	37	2	0	0	0	2
1939–40	New York Americans	NHL	45	1	3	4	28	—	—	—	—	—
1940–41	New York Americans	NHL	36	5	6	11	31	—	—	—	—	—
1941–42	Brooklyn Americans	NHL	41	6	9	15	23	—	—	—	—	—
1942–43	Winnipeg RCAF	MHL	2	0	1	1	5	—	—	—	—	—
1942–43	Calgary RCAF Mustangs	ASHL	16	1	4	5	32	8	2	4	6	8
1943–44	Ottawa Commandos	QSHL	8	0	4	4	22	—	—	—	—	—
1944–45	Montreal Canadiens	NHL	9	1	0	1	10	6	1	2	3	0
1944–45	Chicago Black Hawks	NHL	39	3	4	7	22	—	—	—	—	—
1945–46	Buffalo Bisons	AHL	36	1	10	11	22	12	0	2	2	8
1946–47	Buffalo Bisons	AHL	62	2	14	16	34	4	0	0	0	4
1947–48	Buffalo Bisons	AHL	51	0	17	17	28	6	0	2	2	2
1948–49	Houston Huskies	USHL	64	6	18	24	34	—	—	—	—	—
1949–50	Buffalo Bisons	AHL	66	3	7	10	31	5	0	0	0	0
1950–51	Kansas City Royals	USHL	52	4	13	17	16	—	—	—	—	—
1951–52	Halifax St. Mary's	MMHL	5	0	1	1	12	—	—	—	—	—
NHL totals			219	17	25	42	151	2	0	0	0	2

== Awards and achievements ==
- Turnbull Cup MJHL Championship (1935)
- Memorial Cup Championship (1935)
- Calder Cup (AHL) Championship (1946)
- Honoured Member of the Manitoba Hockey Hall of Fame
