= Bill Kendall (ice hockey) =

Canadian ice hockey player

- Born: April 1, 1910 Winnipeg, Manitoba, Canada
- Died: April 18, 1996 (aged 86) Chillicothe, Missouri, U.S.
- Height: 6 ft 0 in (183 cm)
- Weight: 205 lb (93 kg; 14 st 9 lb)
- Position: Right Wing
- Shot: Right
- Played for: Chicago Black Hawks; Toronto Maple Leafs
- Playing career: 1930–1946

William Kendall (April 1, 1910 — April 18, 1996) was a Canadian professional ice hockey player.

== Career ==
Kendall played for several teams in the minor leagues including the St. Louis Flyers and the London Tecumsehs. He played in the NHL for the Chicago Black Hawks and the Toronto Maple Leafs from 1934 to 1938 and won the Stanley Cup with Chicago in 1934.

From 1942–1944, he served with the Canadian Army during World War II. After the war, Kendall returned to hockey and played two seasons before retiring in 1946.

== Career statistics ==
=== Regular season and playoffs ===
			Regular season					Playoffs
Season	Team	League	GP	G	A	Pts	PIM	GP	G	A	Pts	PIM
1928–29	Elmwood Millionaires	WJrHL	5	1	0	1	0	2	0	1	1	0
1928–29	Elmwood Millionaires	M-Cup	—	—	—	—	—	7	6	2	8	2
1929–30	Elmwood Millionaires	WJrHL	8	6	1	7	4	2	0	1	1	4
1929–30	Elmwood Millionaires	M-Cup	—	—	—	—	—	5	3	1	4	6
1930–31	Elmwood Maple Leafs	MHL	3	1	0	1	0	—	—	—	—	—
1930–31	St. Louis Flyers	AHA	23	5	2	7	8	—	—	—	—	—
1931–32	St. Louis Flyers	AHA	47	4	4	8	41	—	—	—	—	—
1932–33	Duluth Hornets / Wichita Blue Jays	AHA	41	10	6	16	12	—	—	—	—	—
1933–34	Chicago Black Hawks	NHL	21	3	0	3	0	2	0	0	0	0
1933–34	London Tecumsehs	IHL	26	5	6	11	10	6	0	4	4	4
1934–35	Chicago Black Hawks	NHL	47	6	4	10	16	2	0	0	0	0
1935–36	London Tecumsehs	IHL	22	9	4	13	12	—	—	—	—	—
1935–36	Chicago Black Hawks	NHL	22	2	2	4	0	2	0	0	0	0
1936–37	Chicago Black Hawks	NHL	18	3	0	3	8	—	—	—	—	—
1936–37	Toronto Maple Leafs	NHL	21	2	4	6	2	—	—	—	—	—
1937–38	Chicago Black Hawks	NHL	9	0	1	1	2	—	—	—	—	—
1937–38	St. Louis Flyers	AHA	39	17	10	27	24	7	2	1	3	2
1938–39	St. Louis Flyers	AHA	48	27	27	54	47	7	3	4	7	5
1939–40	St. Louis Flyers	AHA	48	30	30	60	30	5	1	1	2	2
1940–41	St. Louis Flyers	AHA	30	23	12	35	11	9	1	2	3	4
1941–42	St. Louis Flyers	AHA	50	13	8	21	17	3	0	1	1	0
1944–45	St. Louis Flyers	AHL	60	15	31	46	4	—	—	—	—	—
1945–46	St. Louis Flyers	AHL	27	2	6	8	0	—	—	—	—	—
AHA totals			326	129	99	228	190	31	7	9	16	13
NHL totals			138	16	11	27	28	6	0	0	0	0

== Awards and achievements ==
- Stanley Cup Championship (1934)
- AHA Championships (1938, 1939, & 1941)
- AHA Second All-Star Team (1940)
- Honoured Member of the Manitoba Hockey Hall of Fame
