= George Brown (ice hockey) =

Canadian ice hockey player

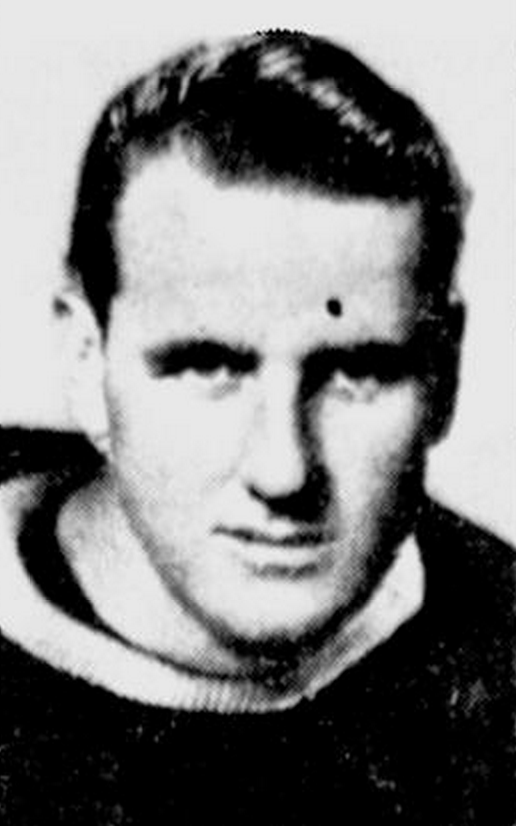
- Born: May 17, 1912 Winnipeg, Manitoba, Canada
- Died: January 23, 1972 (aged 59) Verdun, Quebec, Canada
- Height: 5 ft 11 in (180 cm)
- Weight: 185 lb (84 kg; 13 st 3 lb)
- Position: Centre
- Shot: Left
- Played for: Montreal Canadiens
- Playing career: 1932–1943

George Allen Brown (May 17, 1912 – January 23, 1972) was a Canadian ice hockey centre who played 79 games in the National Hockey League with the Montreal Canadiens between 1937 and 1939. The rest of his career, which lasted from 1932 to 1943, was spent in minor leagues. He was born in Winnipeg, Manitoba.

== Playing career ==
Brown began his hockey career with the Montreal Canadiens in the 1936–37 NHL season playing 27 games (4–6–10) during the regular season then four playoff games in which he went pointless. The following season, he split his time between Montreal and the IAHL New Haven Eagles. That season he was again held pointless during the playoffs. He played his final season with Montreal before going back to the IAHL for the rest of his playing career where he played for the Eagles again followed by the Springfield Indians and the Hershey Bears.

== Career statistics ==
=== Regular season and playoffs ===
			Regular season					Playoffs
Season	Team	League	GP	G	A	Pts	PIM	GP	G	A	Pts	PIM
1930–31	Elmwood Millionaires	WDJHL	10	5	0	5	22	3	1	1	2	6
1930–31	Elmwood Millionaires	M-Cup	—	—	—	—	—	9	3	0	3	20
1931–32	Winnipeg Monarchs	WDJHL	12	5	1	6	40	4	1	0	1	15
1931–32	Winnipeg Monarchs	M-Cup	—	—	—	—	—	8	4	1	5	25
1932–33	Winnipeg Monarchs	WSrHL	—	—	—	—	—	—	—	—	—	—
1933–34	Montreal Royals	MSrHL	16	6	5	11	36	2	0	0	0	4
1934–35	Verdun Maple Leafs	MSrHL	20	18	19	37	22	—	—	—	—	—
1935–36	Verdun Maple Leafs	MSrHL	22	19	23	42	48	7	4	4	8	22
1936–37	Montreal Canadiens	NHL	27	4	6	10	10	4	0	0	0	0
1937–38	New Haven Eagles	IAHL	10	1	4	5	2	—	—	—	—	—
1937–38	Montreal Canadiens	NHL	34	1	7	8	14	3	0	0	0	2
1938–39	Montreal Canadiens	NHL	18	1	9	10	10	—	—	—	—	—
1938–39	New Haven Eagles	IAHL	35	10	7	17	32	—	—	—	—	—
1939–40	Syracuse Stars	IAHL	11	1	2	3	2	—	—	—	—	—
1939–40	Springfield Indians	IAHL	12	0	5	5	10	—	—	—	—	—
1939–40	Hershey Bears	IAHL	7	0	0	0	0	—	—	—	—	—
1940–41	Saint-Jerome Papermakers	QPHL	13	8	7	15	12	—	—	—	—	—
1940–41	Saint-Jerome Papermakers	Al-Cup	—	—	—	—	—	4	1	0	1	6
1941–42	Montreal Senior Canadiens	QSHL	38	3	6	9	83	6	0	1	1	16
1942–43	Montreal Senior Canadiens	QSHL	17	3	4	7	26	—	—	—	—	—
1942–43	Montreal Royals	QSHL	7	0	1	1	6	4	1	0	1	8
NHL totals			79	6	22	28	34	7	0	0	0	2

== Awards and achievements ==
- Memorial Cup Championship (1931)
- MCHL Scoring Champion (1936)
