= 1935 Memorial Cup =

Canadian junior ice hockey championship

The Memorial Cup trophy

The 1935 Memorial Cup final was the 17th junior ice hockey championship of the Canadian Amateur Hockey Association (CAHA). The George Richardson Memorial Trophy champions Sudbury Cub Wolves of the Northern Ontario Hockey Association in Eastern Canada competed against the Abbott Cup champions Winnipeg Monarchs of the Manitoba Junior Hockey League in Western Canada. In a best-of-three series, held at Shea's Amphitheatre in Winnipeg, Manitoba, Winnipeg won their 1st Memorial Cup, defeating Sudbury 2 games to 1.

The Ontario Hockey Association was late in deciding its champion due to the use of an ineligible player by the Oshawa Generals. CAHA president E. A. Gilroy stated the matter would be dealt with at the next general meeting to avoid a repeat, as it was unfair to teams in Western Canada to sit idle waiting to play an Eastern Canada team.

In Game 2, three of the seven Sudbury goals came on power plays in the final two minutes. By the last 15 seconds, the Monarchs had only their goalie and a defenceman left, unpenalized, on the ice, and very nearly just their goalie. An unlimited number of players could be penalized at once according to the rules of the day. The displeased Winnipeg crowd bombarded the rink with programs and peanut shells.

The Monarchs were invited by Cecil Duncan to play a tour in the United Kingdom, coinciding with the Canada men's national ice hockey team tour of Europe in advance of ice hockey at the 1936 Winter Olympics.

== Scores ==
- Game 1: Winnipeg 7-6 Sudbury
- Game 2: Sudbury 7-2 Winnipeg
- Game 3: Winnipeg 4-1 Sudbury

== Winning roster ==
Ken Barker, Pete Belanger, Jack Boyd, Wilf Field, Paul Gauthier, Burr Keenan, Joe Krol, Romeo Martel, Ike Prokaski, Paul Rheault, Fred White. Coach: Harry Neil
