= Bruce Carmichael =

Canadian ice hockey player (1934–2019)

- Born: March 28, 1934 Winnipeg, Manitoba, Canada
- Died: 26 April 2019 (aged 85) Burnaby, British Columbia, Canada
- Height: 5 ft 11 in (180 cm)
- Weight: 178 lb (81 kg; 12 st 10 lb)
- Position: Left wing
- Shot: Left
- Played for: Saskatoon Quakers; Vancouver Canucks; Victoria Cougars; Springfield Indians; Los Angeles Blades; Victoria Maple Leafs; San Diego Gulls; Salt Lake Golden Eagles
- Playing career: 1950–1970

Bruce William Carmichael (March 28, 1934 – April 26, 2019) was a Canadian ice hockey left winger who played 1,049 professional games, scored 401 goals, 531 assists for a total of 932 career points.

== Awards and achievements ==
- MJHL Championship (1953)
- WHL Championship (1960)
- Honoured Member of the Manitoba Hockey Hall of Fame
