= Paul Platz =

Canadian ice hockey player

Paul Platz (July 28, 1920 – November 8, 2012) was a Canadian ice hockey left winger who played on three provincial championships with the Winnipeg Monarchs. He was born in Winnipeg, Manitoba.

== Awards and achievements ==
- USHL Championship (1946)
- “Honoured Member” of the Manitoba Hockey Hall of Fame
