= Wally Stanowski =

Canadian ice hockey player

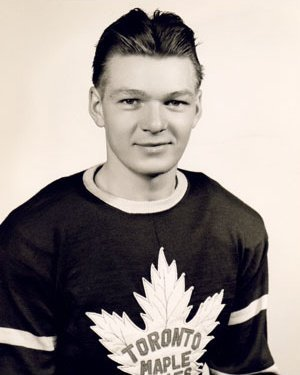
- Stanowski with the Toronto Maple Leafs
- Born: April 28, 1919 Winnipeg, Manitoba, Canada
- Died: June 28, 2015 (aged 96) Toronto, Ontario, Canada
- Height: 6 ft 1 in (185 cm)
- Weight: 180 lb (82 kg; 12 st 12 lb)
- Position: Defence
- Shot: Left
- Played for: Toronto Maple Leafs; New York Rangers
- Playing career: 1939–1951

Walter Peter Stanowski (April 28, 1919 – June 28, 2015) was a Canadian ice hockey defenceman. He was born in Winnipeg, Manitoba.

Stanowski started his National Hockey League career with the Toronto Maple Leafs in 1939. In 1941, he was a member of the NHL All-Star team. He won four Stanley Cups with the Maple Leafs. Stanowski was traded to the New York Rangers after the 1947-48 season. He retired after the 1951 season.

In 1942 Stanowski was the first Leaf defenseman to record 4 points in a playoff game, setting a franchise record that still stands today. Allan Stanley (1960), Ian Turnbull (1976), and Morgan Rielly (2023) are the other Leafs who have done it since.

Stanowski was the last surviving member of Maple Leafs 1942 and 1945 Stanley Cup team.

As of 2015, Stanowski lived in a retirement home near Toronto. He died on June 28, 2015. At the time of his death, Stanowski was the oldest surviving Maple Leaf.

On October 14, 2016, Stanowski was named by the Maple Leafs as #66 of the one hundred greatest players in team history.

== Personal life ==
Wally's son Skip played for Cornell, winning a national title in 1967.

== Awards and achievements ==
- Turnbull Cup MJHL Championship (1938)
- Memorial Cup Championship (1938)
- NHL first All-Star team (1941)
- Stanley Cup Championships (1942, 1945, 1947, & 1948)
- Played in NHL All-Star Game (1947)
- Inducted into the Manitoba Sports Hall of Fame and Museum in 2004
- "Honoured Member" of the Manitoba Hockey Hall of Fame

== Career statistics ==
			Regular season					Playoffs
Season	Team	League	GP	G	A	Pts	PIM	GP	G	A	Pts	PIM
1935–36	East Kildonan Bisons	MAHA	—	—	—	—	—	—	—	—	—	—
1936–37	St. Boniface Seals	MJHL	15	7	6	13	4	7	3	1	4	4
1937–38	St. Boniface Seals	MJHL	15	8	13	21	7	10	4	7	11	6
1937–38	Winnipeg CPR	WSrHL	6	4	3	7	0	—	—	—	—	—
1937–38	St. Boniface Seals	M-Cup	—	—	—	—	—	11	6	4	10	2
1938–39	Syracuse Stars	IAHL	54	1	16	17	8	3	0	2	2	0
1939–40	Toronto Maple Leafs	NHL	27	2	7	9	11	10	1	0	1	2
1939–40	Providence Reds	IAHL	8	0	3	3	6	—	—	—	—	—
1940–41	Toronto Maple Leafs	NHL	47	7	14	21	35	7	0	3	3	2
1941–42	Toronto Maple Leafs	NHL	24	1	7	8	10	13	2	8	10	2
1942–43	Winnipeg RCAF	WNDHL	13	5	12	17	20	5	2	1	3	16
1942–43	Winnipeg RCAF	Al-Cup	—	—	—	—	—	12	6	5	11	4
1943–44	Winnipeg RCAF	WNDHL	9	1	3	4	12	—	—	—	—	—
1944–45	Winnipeg RCAF	WNDHL	3	1	1	2	8	—	—	—	—	—
1944–45	Toronto Maple Leafs	NHL	34	2	9	11	16	13	0	1	1	5
1945–46	Toronto Maple Leafs	NHL	45	3	10	13	10	—	—	—	—	—
1946–47	Toronto Maple Leafs	NHL	51	3	16	19	12	8	0	0	0	0
1947–48	Toronto Maple Leafs	NHL	54	2	11	13	12	9	0	2	2	2
1948–49	New York Rangers	NHL	60	1	8	9	16	—	—	—	—	—
1949–50	New York Rangers	NHL	37	1	1	2	10	—	—	—	—	—
1950–51	New York Rangers	NHL	49	1	5	6	28	—	—	—	—	—
1950–51	Cincinnati Mohawks	AHL	7	0	0	0	2	—	—	—	—	—
1951–52	Cincinnati Mohawks	AHL	33	0	11	11	42	—	—	—	—	—
NHL totals			428	23	88	111	160	60	3	14	17	13
