= Danny Summers =

Canadian ice hockey player

Danny Summers (March 25, 1924 in Winnipeg, Manitoba – July 15, 1999) was a Canadian ice hockey defenceman who had an 18-year pro career, 10 of which were in the AHL and enjoyed a 20-year NHL scouting career for the Detroit Red Wings, New York Rangers and San Jose Sharks.

Summers was inducted into the Manitoba Sports Hall of Fame in 1995 as a Builder for his successful scouting career.

== Awards and achievements ==
- AHL Championship (1949)
- WHL Championship (1956)
- IHL Championships (1960 & 1961)
- Allan Cup Championship (1964)
- "Honoured Member" of the Manitoba Hockey Hall of Fame
