= Bobby Kirk (ice hockey) =

Canadian ice hockey player

- Born: 8 August 1909 Doagh, Ireland, United Kingdom
- Died: 11 July 1970 (aged 60)
- Height: 5 ft 9 in (175 cm)
- Weight: 180 lb (82 kg; 12 st 12 lb)
- Position: Right Wing
- Shot: Right
- Played for: New York Rangers
- Playing career: 1928–1942

Robert Hunter "Cagey" Kirk (8 August 1909 – 11 July 1970) was an ice hockey player. He played 39 games in the National Hockey League with the New York Rangers during the 1937–38 season. The rest of his career, which lasted from 1928 to 1942, was spent in the minor leagues.

== Early life ==
Kirk was born in Doagh, Ireland, United Kingdom, and grew up in Winnipeg, Manitoba, Canada. He played junior hockey in Manitoba.

== Career ==
Kirk played for the Elmwood Millionaires and competed in the 1929 Memorial Cup. Kirk made his National Hockey League debut with the New York Rangers in 1938 and played 39 games with the team. He was later a coach for the Flin Flon Bombers and Buffalo Bisons.

== Career statistics ==
=== Regular season and playoffs ===
			Regular season					Playoffs
Season	Team	League	GP	G	A	Pts	PIM	GP	G	A	Pts	PIM
1927–28	Elmwood Millionaires	WJrHL	1	0	0	0	0	—	—	—	—	—
1928–29	Elmwood Millionaires	WJrHL	8	6	1	7	—	3	0	1	1	4
1928–29	Winnipeg CPR	MSrHL	5	0	1	1	4	—	—	—	—	—
1928–29	Elmwood Millionaires	M-Cup	—	—	—	—	—	7	5	2	7	11
1929–30	Elmwood Millionaires	WJrHL	5	8	1	9	12	—	—	—	—	—
1930–31	St. Louis Flyers	AHA	32	9	3	12	12	—	—	—	—	—
1931–32	St. Louis Flyers	AHA	39	1	4	5	16	—	—	—	—	—
1932–33	Vancouver Maroons	WCHL	29	10	2	12	14	2	0	0	0	0
1933–34	Vancouver Lions	NWHL	34	9	2	11	28	7	3	0	3	4
1934–35	Vancouver Lions	NWHL	37	26	11	37	30	8	4	2	6	8
1935–36	Philadelphia Ramblers	Can-Am	48	22	29	51	16	4	0	1	1	0
1936–37	Philadelphia Ramblers	IAHL	36	7	15	22	8	6	2	1	3	0
1937–38	New York Rangers	NHL	39	4	8	12	14	—	—	—	—	—
1937–38	Philadelphia Ramblers	IAHL	11	7	1	8	4	5	1	2	3	2
1938–39	Philadelphia Ramblers	IAHL	49	14	36	50	12	9	2	6	8	2
1939–40	Philadelphia Ramblers	IAHL	11	0	4	4	0	—	—	—	—	—
1939–40	Hershey Bears	IAHL	43	16	12	26	6	6	0	1	1	4
1940–41	Hershey Bears	AHL	52	19	26	45	6	10	4	2	6	4
1941–42	Hershey Bears	AHL	53	14	27	41	18	10	1	4	5	0
1941–42	Philadelphia Rockets	AHL	4	3	2	5	0	—	—	—	—	—
IAHL/AHL totals			259	80	123	203	54	46	10	16	26	12
NHL totals			39	4	8	12	14	—	—	—	—	—

== Awards and achievements ==
- NWHL First All-Star Team (1936)
