= William Meronek =

Canadian ice hockey player

- Born: April 15, 1917 Stony Mountain, Manitoba, Canada
- Died: May 25, 1999 (aged 82)
- Height: 5 ft 9 in (175 cm)
- Weight: 155 lb (70 kg; 11 st 1 lb)
- Position: Centre
- Shot: Left
- Played for: Montreal Canadiens
- Playing career: 1937–1950

William Meronek (April 15, 1917 — May 25, 1999), nicknamed "Bill" or "Smiley", was a Canadian professional ice hockey forward who played 20 games in the National Hockey League for the Montreal Canadiens between 1940 and 1943. The rest of his career, which lasted from 1937 to 1950, was spent in various minor leagues. He was born in Stony Mountain, Manitoba.

== Career statistics ==
=== Regular season and playoffs ===
			Regular season					Playoffs
Season	Team	League	GP	G	A	Pts	PIM	GP	G	A	Pts	PIM
1934–35	St. Boniface Seals	MJHL	10	7	7	14	0	—	—	—	—	—
1935–36	Portage Terriers	MJHL	16	16	7	23	2	6	6	6	12	6
1936–37	Portage Terriers	MJHL	16	21	20	41	4	4	3	0	3	2
1937–38	Verdun Maple Leafs	QSHL	20	10	10	20	4	8	4	3	7	0
1938–39	Verdun Maple Leafs	QSHL	22	17	17	34	9	2	0	1	1	0
1939–40	Montreal Canadiens	NHL	8	2	2	4	0	—	—	—	—	—
1939–40	Verdun Maple Leafs	QSHL	26	14	23	37	10	—	—	—	—	—
1940–41	Montreal Senior Canadiens	QSHL	29	17	10	27	4	—	—	—	—	—
1941–42	Montreal Senior Canadiens	QSHL	31	4	15	19	32	6	8	6	14	0
1942–43	Montreal Senior Canadiens	QSHL	23	13	19	32	4	—	—	—	—	—
1942–43	Montreal Canadiens	NHL	12	3	6	9	0	1	0	0	0	0
1943–44	Montreal Royals	QSHL	19	12	16	28	0	7	6	4	10	0
1943–44	Montreal Noordyn	MCHL	10	13	13	26	6	—	—	—	—	—
1944–45	Montreal Royals	QSHL	23	16	32	48	8	6	3	4	7	0
1945–46	Montreal Royals	QSHL	35	15	36	51	18	8	0	4	4	2
1946–47	Lachine Rapides	QPHL	49	39	63	102	14	10	4	7	11	10
1947–48	Lachine Rapides	QPHL	1	0	0	0	0	—	—	—	—	—
1948–49	Hull Volants	ECSHL	15	11	27	38	4	7	8	3	11	2
1949–50	Hull Volants	ECSHL	10	5	10	15	0	13	7	11	18	0
1949–50	Cornwall Calumets	ECSHL	15	7	17	24	6	—	—	—	—	—
QSHL totals			229	118	178	296	89	37	21	22	43	2
NHL totals			20	5	8	13	0	1	0	0	0	0

== Awards and achievements ==
- MJHL Scoring Champion (1937)
- Honoured Member of the Manitoba Hockey Hall of Fame
