= Red Carr =

Canadian ice hockey player

- Born: December 29, 1916 Winnipeg, Manitoba, Canada
- Died: May 16, 1990 (aged 73)
- Height: 5 ft 8 in (173 cm)
- Weight: 178 lb (81 kg; 12 st 10 lb)
- Position: Left wing
- Shot: Left
- Played for: Toronto Maple Leafs
- Playing career: 1934–1952

Alfred George Richard "Red" Carr (December 29, 1916 – May 16, 1990) was a Canadian ice hockey left winger. He played 5 games in the National Hockey League with the Toronto Maple Leafs during the 1943–44 season. The rest of his career, which lasted from 1934 to 1952, was spent in the minor leagues. He played junior hockey for the Winnipeg Junior Falcons. He was born in Winnipeg, Manitoba. He was the father of Gene Carr, who also played in the NHL. In September 2010 Carr was posthumously selected to be one of a number of athletes, builders, and media to be inducted into the Nanaimo Sports Hall of Fame.

Carr died on May 16, 1990.

== Career statistics ==
=== Regular season and playoffs ===
| | | | Regular season | | | | | Playoffs |
| Season | Team | League | GP | G | A | Pts | PIM | GP | G | A | Pts | PIM |
|---|---|---|---|---|---|---|---|---|---|---|---|---|
| 1931–32 | Winnipeg Falcons | WJrHL | 4 | 0 | 0 | 0 | 12 | 1 | 0 | 0 | 0 | 0 |
| 1932–33 | Winnipeg Falcons | WJrHL | 10 | 0 | 2 | 2 | 20 | — | — | — | — | — |
| 1933–34 | Winnipeg Falcons | WJrHL | — | — | — | — | — | — | — | — | — | — |
| 1934–35 | Nelson Maple Leafs | WKHL | — | — | — | — | — | — | — | — | — | — |
| 1935–36 | Trail Smoke Eaters | WKHL | 14 | 5 | 1 | 6 | 11 | 8 | 7 | 2 | 9 | 4 |
| 1936–37 | Nelson Maple Leafs | WKHL | 14 | 6 | 5 | 11 | 20 | 3 | 1 | 0 | 1 | 12 |
| 1936–37 | Nelson Maple Leafs | Al-Cup | — | — | — | — | — | 4 | 3 | 5 | 8 | 4 |
| 1937–38 | Nelson Maple Leafs | WKHL | 24 | 19 | 16 | 35 | 43 | 2 | 0 | 1 | 1 | 2 |
| 1938–39 | Nelson Maple Leafs | WKHL | 19 | 12 | 6 | 18 | 43 | 3 | 3 | 0 | 3 | 8 |
| 1939–40 | Nelson Maple Leafs | WKHL | 23 | 12 | 7 | 19 | 29 | 7 | 0 | 3 | 3 | 14 |
| 1940–41 | Bralorne Barons | BCIHA | — | — | — | — | — | — | — | — | — | — |
| 1941–42 | Nanaimo Clippers | PCHL | 27 | 20 | 16 | 36 | 54 | 7 | 6 | 2 | 8 | 6 |
| 1942–43 | Nanaimo Clippers | PCHL | 20 | 12 | 8 | 20 | 9 | 3 | 0 | 1 | 1 | 2 |
| 1943–44 | Toronto Maple Leafs | NHL | 5 | 0 | 1 | 1 | 2 | — | — | — | — | — |
| 1943–44 | Toronto CIL | TMHL | 3 | 0 | 0 | 0 | 2 | — | — | — | — | — |
| 1943–44 | Toronto Staffords | TMHL | 2 | 2 | 0 | 2 | 0 | — | — | — | — | — |
| 1943–44 | Providence Reds | AHL | 2 | 0 | 0 | 0 | 0 | — | — | — | — | — |
| 1944–45 | Toronto Staffords | OHA Sr | 4 | 3 | 7 | 10 | 0 | — | — | — | — | — |
| 1944–45 | Toronto Auto Workers | TMHL | 9 | 15 | 15 | 30 | 9 | — | — | — | — | — |
| 1944–45 | Providence Reds | AHL | 2 | 0 | 0 | 0 | 0 | — | — | — | — | — |
| 1945–46 | Portland Eagles | PCHL | 54 | 43 | 49 | 92 | 91 | 8 | 7 | 3 | 10 | 15 |
| 1946–47 | New Westminster Royals | PCHL | 57 | 19 | 42 | 61 | 34 | 4 | 1 | 2 | 3 | 0 |
| 1947–48 | New Westminster Royals | PCHL | 33 | 7 | 14 | 21 | 22 | — | — | — | — | — |
| 1948–49 | Milwaukee Clarks | IHL | 32 | 19 | 27 | 46 | 39 | 4 | 0 | 1 | 1 | 0 |
| 1949–50 | Nanaimo Clippers | BCIHA | 31 | 14 | 31 | 45 | 33 | 8 | 2 | 2 | 4 | 6 |
| 1950–51 | Nanaimo Clippers | BCIHA | 45 | 18 | 41 | 59 | 42 | 9 | 3 | 9 | 12 | 8 |
| 1951–52 | Nanaimo Clippers | BCIHA | 41 | 15 | 17 | 32 | 33 | 6 | 2 | 3 | 5 | 2 |
| 1951–52 | Nanaimo Clippers | Al-Cup | — | — | — | — | — | 5 | 0 | 1 | 1 | 6 |
| NHL totals | | | 5 | 0 | 1 | 1 | 2 | — | — | — | — | — |
