= 1929 Memorial Cup =

Canadian junior ice hockey championship

The Memorial Cup trophy

The 1929 Memorial Cup final was the 11th junior ice hockey championship of the Canadian Amateur Hockey Association. The George Richardson Memorial Trophy champions Toronto Marlboros of the Ontario Hockey Association in Eastern Canada competed against the Abbott Cup champions Elmwood Millionaires of the Manitoba Junior Hockey League in Western Canada. In a best-of-three series, held at the Arena Gardens in Toronto, Ontario, Toronto won their first Memorial Cup, defeating Elmwood two games to none.

== Scores ==
- Game 1: Toronto 4-2 Elmwood (OT)
- Game 2: Toronto 4-2 Elmwood

== Winning roster ==
Eddie Convey, Charlie Conacher, Clarence Christie, Jim Darragh, Bob Gamble, Max Hackett, Red Horner, Busher Jackson, Alex Levinsky, Alf Moore, Laurie Moore, Harry Montgomery, Ellis Pringle. Coach: Frank J. Selke
