= William Earl Ormshaw =

William Earl Ormshaw (February 7, 1937 – March 25, 2007) was a Canadian hockey referee and a member of the Manitoba Hockey Hall of Fame since 2005.

== Early life and education ==
Ormshaw was born in Winnipeg, Manitoba, and grew up on Pritchard Avenue. He attended Isaac Newton High School.

== Career ==
He began his officiating career in the early 1960s, officiating young children. This was the beginning of his long standing career as an on-ice official. He worked his way through all levels of minor hockey until he began to referee higher levels of hockey. He began to work Intermediate hockey throughout the leagues in rural Manitoba, back when these games were officiated with only two referees as opposed to the more common three-official system. Ultimately, he officiated in the Western Canada Hockey League as both a referee and a linesman in the Canadian University, the Canadian Amateur Senior Hockey League (CASH), as well as virtually every league in Winnipeg and the surrounding areas. His recorded number of games throughout his officiating career number near 1800, which does not include his years of minor hockey, nor many of the championship events he worked.

His attended many prestigious events. He was a linesman at the World Junior Hockey Championships in Winnipeg in 1974–75. He was a referee at the Canadian University Championships in Trois-Rivières, Quebec in 1983–84. Ormshaw also officiated at three Canadian Allan Cups, all in Thunder Bay, Ontario. He officiated at two Centennial Cups in Selkirk and Portage la Prairie, Manitoba. He has refereed at three Hardy Cup championships with the Winnipeg North End Flyers as well as the Warroad Lakers.

One of the most prominent achievements that Ormshaw was awarded was his certification as a Level VI official by the Canadian Hockey Association. He received this certification in 1978 in Ottawa, Ontario. The Canadian Hockey Association's officiating program has six levels, where only the most elite ever receive the recognition as a Level VI.

== Later life and death ==
Ormshaw was also a leader within the hockey program and community in Manitoba. He served as the Referee-In-Chief for many leagues, and until the day of his death on March 25, 2007, remained the Referee-In-Chief of the Manitoba Major Junior Hockey League. He was in a supervisory role at many prestigious and high-profile events, including the Centennial Cup National Championships held in Winnipeg in 1992. Throughout his years, he was responsible for the development of countless officials who went on to national, international or professional competition, including NHL referees Vaughn Rody and Ryan Galloway.
