= Butch Lee (ice hockey) =

Canadian ice hockey defenceman (1929–2021)

- Born: October 28, 1929; Pierson, Manitoba, Canada
- Died: July 19, 2021 (aged 91); Melita, Manitoba, Canada
- Position: Defenceman
- SWHL team: Pierson Bruins

Allan "Butch" Lee (October 28, 1929 – July 19, 2021) was a Canadian ice hockey defenceman who played 28 seasons with the Pierson Bruins. Lee died in Melita, Manitoba on July 19, 2021, at the age of 91.

== Awards and achievements ==
- "Honoured Member" of the Manitoba Hockey Hall of Fame
