= Murray Balagus =

Canadian ice hockey player (1929–2021)

Murray Balagus (October 15, 1929 – January 21, 2021) was a Canadian ice hockey centreman who played on six Manitoba Senior Hockey Championship teams. Balagus was born in Winnipeg, Manitoba on October 15, 1929, and died in Winnipeg on January 21, 2021, at the age of 91.

== Awards and achievements ==
- “Honoured Member” of the Manitoba Hockey Hall of Fame
