= Alf Moore =

Australian rules footballer

Personal information
- Full name: Arthur Edward Moore
- Born: 21 March 1870; Richmond, Victoria
- Died: 15 July 1950 (aged 80); Hawthorn, Victoria
- Original team: Parkside

Playing career^{1}
Years	Club	Games (Goals)
1898	Carlton	2 (0)
- ^{1} Playing statistics correct to the end of 1898.

Arthur Edward "Alf" Moore (21 March 1870 – 15 July 1950) was an Australian rules footballer who played for the Carlton Football Club in the Victorian Football League (VFL).

== Family ==
The son of William Trivess Moore (1844–1896), and Frances Emily Moore (1852–1880), née Cowan, Arthur Edward Moore was born at Richmond, Victoria on 21 March 1870.

He married Letitia Tyley (1875–1962) in 1899.

His cousin, Robert Clements "Bob" Moore (1872–1938) was also a VFL footballer; he played 2 games with the Melbourne Football Club in 1898.

== Football ==
Recruited from Norwood, he played 2 games for Carlton.

== Death ==
He died at Hawthorn, Victoria on 15 July 1950.
