= Billy Saunders =

Canadian ice hockey player

Bill Saunders
- Born: November 22, 1937 (age 88) Winnipeg, Manitoba, Canada
- Height: 5 ft 9 in (175 cm)
- Weight: 170 lb (77 kg; 12 st 2 lb)
- Position: Left wing
- Shot: Left
- Played for: Portland Buckaroos
- Playing career: 1955–1975

William George Saunders (born November 22, 1937) was a Canadian ice hockey forward who scored 425 goals, third on the WHL All-Time list.

== Awards and achievements ==
- Turnbull Cup MJHL Championships (1956 & 1957)
- WHL Championships (1965 & 1971)
- "Honoured Member" of the Manitoba Hockey Hall of Fame
