= Howard Crawford =

Howard Leslie "Krug" Crawford (1892–1959) was a reporter and a news, sports, and managing editor for the Brandon Sun from 1919 until his death in 1959. He is an "Honoured Member" of the Manitoba Hockey Hall of Fame.
