= Pete Kapusta =

Canadian ice hockey player

- Born: February 3, 1924 Winnipeg, Manitoba, Canada
- Died: July 16, 2016 (aged 92) Winnipeg, Manitoba, Canada
- Height: 6 ft 0 in (183 cm)
- Weight: 175 lb (79 kg; 12 st 7 lb)
- Position: Left wing
- Shot: Left
- Played for: Providence Reds
- Playing career: 1939–1960

Peter Louis Kapusta (February 3, 1924 – July 16, 2016) was a Canadian ice hockey forward who played nine AHL seasons with Providence Reds.

== Awards and achievements ==
- Calder Cup (AHL) Championship (1961)
- “Honoured Member” of the Manitoba Hockey Hall of Fame
