= Art Somers =

Canadian ice hockey player

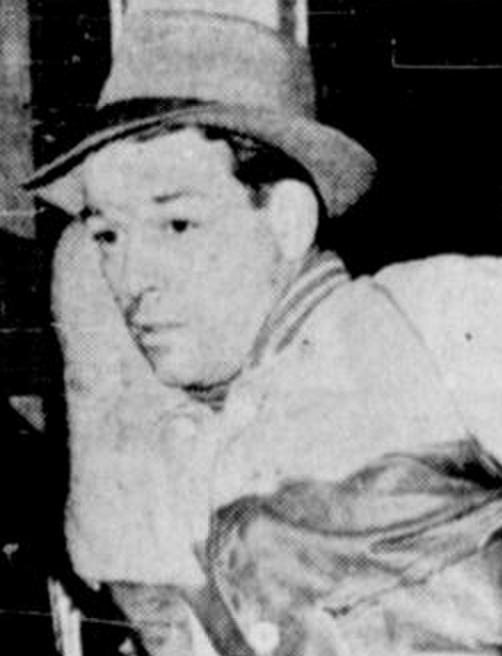
- Art Somers, Canadian ice hockey player
- Born: January 19, 1902 Winnipeg, Manitoba, Canada
- Died: January 29, 1992 (aged 90) Winnipeg, Manitoba, Canada
- Height: 5 ft 7 in (170 cm)
- Weight: 165 lb (75 kg; 11 st 11 lb)
- Position: Centre
- Shot: Left
- Played for: Chicago Black Hawks; New York Rangers
- Playing career: 1925–1935

Arthur Ernest James Somers (January 19, 1902 – January 29, 1992) was a Canadian ice hockey player who played 222 games in the National Hockey League with the Chicago Black Hawks and New York Rangers from 1929 to 1935. With the Rangers he won the Stanley Cup in 1933. As a junior ice hockey player, Sommers won the 1921 Memorial Cup with the Winnipeg Junior Falcons. Somers was born in Winnipeg, Manitoba in 1902, and died there in 1992.

== Career statistics ==
=== Regular season and playoffs ===
			Regular season					Playoffs
Season	Team	League	GP	G	A	Pts	PIM	GP	G	A	Pts	PIM
1919–20	Winnipeg YMLC	WDJHL	—	—	—	—	—	—	—	—	—	—
1920–21	Winnipeg Falcons	WDJHL	—	—	—	—	—	—	—	—	—	—
1921–22	Winnipeg Victorias	WSrHL	—	—	—	—	—	—	—	—	—	—
1922–23	Winnipeg Falcons	MHL	16	10	6	16	33	2	0	0	0	2
1922–23	Winnipeg Falcons	Al-Cup	—	—	—	—	—	3	2	0	2	14
1923–24	Winnipeg Falcons	MHL	12	10	6	16	14	—	—	—	—	—
1924–25	Fort William Forts	MHL	20	5	2	7	41	—	—	—	—	—
1925–26	Winnipeg Maroons	CHL	36	21	5	26	61	5	1	1	2	12
1926–27	Winnipeg Maroons	AHA	32	11	10	21	73	3	0	1	1	7
1927–28	Winnipeg Maroons	AHA	40	8	6	14	71	—	—	—	—	—
1928–29	Vancouver Lions	PCHL	35	23	7	30	66	3	3	0	3	2
1929–30	Chicago Black Hawks	NHL	44	11	13	24	76	2	0	0	0	2
1930–31	Chicago Black Hawks	NHL	33	3	6	9	35	9	0	0	0	0
1931–32	New York Rangers	NHL	48	11	15	26	47	7	0	1	1	8
1932–33	New York Rangers	NHL	48	7	15	22	28	8	1	4	5	8
1933–34	New York Rangers	NHL	8	1	2	3	5	2	0	0	0	0
1933–34	Windsor Bulldogs	IHL	7	2	2	4	5	—	—	—	—	—
1934–35	New York Rangers	NHL	41	0	5	5	4	2	0	0	0	0
NHL totals			222	33	56	89	195	30	1	5	6	18

== Awards and achievements ==
- MJHL Turnbull Cup Championship (1921)
- Memorial Cup Championship (1921)
- PCHL Scoring Champion (1929)
- PCHL Goal scoring Leader (1929)
- Stanley Cup championship (1933)
- Honoured Member of the Manitoba Hockey Hall of Fame
