= Elliot Chorley =

Canadian ice hockey player (1931–2008)

- Born: September 12, 1931; Winnipeg, Manitoba, Canada
- Died: December 5, 2008 (aged 77)
- Occupation: Ice Hockey Right Winger

Elliot Chorley (September 12, 1931 – December 5, 2008) was a Canadian ice hockey right winger who played 633 professional games, scored 216 goals, 292 assists for a total of 508 career points. Chorley died on December 5, 2008, at the age of 77.

== Awards and achievements ==
- MJHL First All-Star Team (1950 & 1951)
- MJHL Goal Scoring Leader (1951)
- MJHL Championship (1951)
- WHL Championships (1957 & 1958)
- IHL Championships (1960 & 1961)
- Allan Cup Championship (1964)
- Honoured Member of the Manitoba Hockey Hall of Fame
