= Winnipeg Junior Falcons =

The Winnipeg Junior Falcons were a Canadian junior ice hockey team in the Manitoba Junior Hockey League. They were associated with the Winnipeg Falcons senior hockey team.

== History ==
In the 1920–21 season, the Falcons were the first team from Western Canada to win the Memorial Cup. They also won the Abbott Cup and the Turnbull Cup. The 1921 Winnipeg Junior Falcons were inducted into the Manitoba Hockey Hall of Fame in the team category.

- Team Roster: Fred Comfort (Goal), Harry Neil and Sammy McCallum (Defence), Wally Fridfinnson, Frank Woodall and Harold McMunn (Regular line), Dave Patrick, Herb McMunn, Bill McPherson and Art Somers (Relief Line), Connie Neil (Manager/Coach).

== NHL alumni ==
List of alumni to play in the National Hockey League (NHL):

- Doug Baldwin
- Al Carr
- Phil Hergesheimer
- Art Somers
