= Frank Arnett =

Canadian professional hockey player (1932–2024)

- Born: June 2, 1932; Carman, Manitoba, Canada
- Died: July 16, 2024 (aged 92)
- Height: 5 ft 10 in (178 cm)
- Weight: 185 lb (84 kg; 13 st 3 lb)
- Position: Defense
- Shot: Left
- Played for: Seattle Bombers; Winnipeg Warriors; Seattle Totems; Los Angeles Blades
- Playing career: 1948–1969

Frank Clarence "Crash" Arnett (June 2, 1932 – July 16, 2024) was a Canadian professional hockey player who played 529 games in the Western Hockey League for the Seattle Bombers, Winnipeg Warriors, Seattle Totems and Los Angeles Blades.

Arnett died on July 16, 2024.
