= Ken Nicolson =

Australian rules footballer, born 1902

Personal information
- Full name: Kenneth Wallace Nicolson
- Born: 23 April 1902; Fremantle, Western Australia
- Died: 25 July 1975 (aged 73); St Kilda, Victoria
- Height: 180 cm (5 ft 11 in)
- Weight: 79 kg (174 lb)

Playing career^{1}
Years	Club	Games (Goals)
1923–24	Geelong	23 (7)
- ^{1} Playing statistics correct to the end of 1924.

Kenneth Wallace Nicolson (23 April 1902 – 25 July 1975) was an Australian rules footballer who played with Geelong in the Victorian Football League (VFL).
