= Bob Moore (Australian footballer) =

Australian rules footballer

Personal information
- Full name: Robert Clements Moore
- Born: 31 January 1872; Richmond, Victoria
- Died: 6 June 1938 (aged 66); Randwick, New South Wales

Playing career^{1}
Years	Club	Games (Goals)
1892–1896	Melbourne (VFA)	59 (0)
1898	Melbourne (VFL)	2 (0)
Total		61 (0)
- ^{1} Playing statistics correct to the end of 1898.

Robert Clements Moore (31 January 1872 – 6 June 1938) was an Australian rules footballer who played with Melbourne in both the Victorian Football Association (VFA) and the Victorian Football League (VFL).

== Family ==
One of the six children of Robert Clements Moore (1834-1883), and Catherine Lester Moore (1940-1873), née Taggart, Robert Clements Moore was born at Richmond, Victoria on 31 January 1872.

He married Beatrice Amy Campbell (1878-1957) in Ascot Vale on 2 April 1896. They had three children: James William Moore (1901–1957), Ella Enid Moore (1904–1928), later, Mrs. Neil Mayger, and Nancy Alice Moore (1906–1977), later, Mrs. Sam Peters.

== Football ==
=== Melbourne (VFA) ===
Recruited by Melbourne (VFA) in 1892 from the Parkside Football Club, he played in 18 matches in 1892, in 20 matches in 1893, in 16 matches in 1894, in only 4 matches in 1895, and one match in 1896.

=== Melbourne (VFL) ===
Having not played at all in 1897, he played in two senior VFL matches for Melbourne in 1898, and retired due to his long-standing leg injuries.

== Larceny as a Servant ==
Moore, aged 28, the accountant and cashier of the Equity Trustees, Executors, and Agency Company, in Queen Street Melbourne, was arrested on 17 January 1900, and charged with having stolen £407/19/- from his employers (for whom he had worked since he was 15).

On 9 February 1900, he was found guilty of larceny as a servant and was sentenced to 12 months in prison, with hard labour.

== Death ==
He died at the Hellenic Private Hospital in Randwick, New South Wales on 6 June 1938.
