= Bill MacKenzie =

Canadian ice hockey player (1911 - 1990)

- Born: December 12, 1911 Winnipeg, Manitoba, Canada
- Died: May 29, 1990 (aged 78)
- Height: 5 ft 11 in (180 cm)
- Weight: 175 lb (79 kg; 12 st 7 lb)
- Position: Defence
- Shot: Right
- Played for: Montreal Canadiens; Montreal Maroons; New York Rangers; Chicago Black Hawks
- Playing career: 1934–1945

William Kenneth MacKenzie (December 12, 1911 — May 29, 1990) was a Canadian ice hockey defenceman. He played in the National Hockey League for the Chicago Black Hawks, New York Rangers, Montreal Maroons, and Montreal Canadiens between 1932 and 1940.

== Playing career ==
MacKenzie was born in Winnipeg, Manitoba. He started his National Hockey League career with the Chicago Black Hawks in 1932. He also played for the Montreal Maroons, Montreal Canadiens, and New York Rangers. In January 1935 Bill MacKenzie was loaned to the New York Rangers, for the rest of season, for cash. In the Stanley Cup semi-finals Montreal Maroons defeated the New York Rangers, then defeated Toronto in the Finals. MacKenzie's name somehow was included on the cup, even though he was member of Rangers at the time the Maroons won the Stanley Cup. After the season ended MacKenzie was returned to the Maroons. He began the 1936 season MacKenzie played in the minors with Windos. 1936–37 Bill MacKenzie started with the Montreal Maroons, playing 10 game, but was traded to the Montreal Canadiens. 1938 Bill started the season with the Montreal Canadiens, before being traded to Chicago. He helped the Blackhawks win the Stanley Cup in 1938 getting his name of the Stanley Cup a second time (first time officially). He left the NHL after the 1940 season. He played several more seasons in the AHL before retiring from hockey after 1945.

== Career statistics ==
=== Regular season and playoffs ===
			Regular season					Playoffs
Season	Team	League	GP	G	A	Pts	PIM	GP	G	A	Pts	PIM
1929–30	Elmwood Maple Leafs	WJrHL	9	7	1	8	10	2	1	0	1	6
1929–30	Elmwood Maple Leafs	M-Cup	—	—	—	—	—	5	1	2	3	0
1930–31	Elmwood Maple Leafs	WJrHL	11	8	6	14	6	12	6	3	9	2
1930–31	Elmwood Maple Leafs	M-Cup	—	—	—	—	—	9	7	4	11	2
1931–32	Montreal HC	MCHL	10	0	3	3	22	4	1	1	2	8
1931–32	Montreal HC	Al-Cup	—	—	—	—	—	6	0	0	0	0
1932–33	Chicago Black Hawks	NHL	36	4	4	8	13	—	—	—	—	—
1932–33	Montreal Royals	MCHL	12	7	4	11	33	4	0	0	0	15
1923–33	Montreal Royals	Al-Cup	—	—	—	—	—	6	4	0	4	23
1933–34	Montreal Maroons	NHL	47	3	4	7	20	4	0	0	0	0
1934–35	Montreal Maroons	NHL	5	0	0	0	0	—	—	—	—	—
1934–35	Windsor Bulldogs	IHL	21	3	1	4	19	—	—	—	—	—
1934–35	New York Rangers	NHL	15	1	0	1	10	3	0	0	0	0
1935–36	Windsor Bulldogs	IHL	42	10	8	18	52	8	0	1	1	6
1936–37	Montreal Maroons	NHL	10	0	1	1	6	—	—	—	—	—
1936–37	Montreal Canadiens	NHL	39	4	3	7	22	5	1	0	1	0
1937–38	Montreal Canadiens	NHL	11	0	0	0	4	—	—	—	—	—
1937–38	Chicago Black Hawks	NHL	35	1	2	3	20	9	0	1	1	11
1938–39	Chicago Black Hawks	NHL	47	1	0	1	36	—	—	—	—	—
1939–40	Chicago Black Hawks	NHL	19	0	1	1	14	—	—	—	—	—
1939–40	Providence Reds	IAHL	21	6	7	13	30	7	1	2	3	5
1940–41	Cleveland Barons	AHL	56	7	10	17	34	9	1	1	2	4
1941–42	Cleveland Barons	AHL	56	5	12	17	20	5	0	0	0	0
1942–43	Cleveland Barons	AHL	42	6	8	14	18	4	0	2	2	2
1944–45	Cleveland Barons	AHL	13	0	2	2	6	—	—	—	—	—
NHL totals			264	15	14	29	145	21	1	1	2	11

== Awards and achievements ==
- Memorial Cup Championship (1931)
- Stanley Cup Championship (1938)
- IAHL Second All-Star Team (1940)
- AHL First All-Star Team (1941 & 1942)
- Calder Cup (AHL) Championship (1941)
- AHL Second All-Star Team (1943)
- Honoured Member of the Manitoba Hockey Hall of Fame
