= Del Topoll =

Canadian ice hockey player

- Born: October 21, 1933 (age 91); Durban, Manitoba Canada
- Height: 5 ft 9 in (175 cm)
- Weight: 170 lb (77 kg; 12 st 2 lb)
- Position: Center
- Shot: Left
- Played for: Rochester Americans; Spokane Comets; Seattle Totems; San Francisco Seals; Phoenix Roadrunners; Denver Spurs
- Playing career: 1950–1970

Delvin Allen Topoll (born October 21, 1933) is a former Canadian professional ice hockey player. Topoll played in over 1,000 games in the Western Hockey League and Quebec Hockey League and registered 269 goals and 555 assists for a total of 824 points in an 18-year pro hockey career.

== Awards and achievements ==
- MJHL First All-Star Team (1952)
- MJHL Scoring Champion (1952)
- Turner Cup (IHL) Championship (1953)
- "Honoured Member" of the Manitoba Hockey Hall of Famepointss
