= Art Rice-Jones =

Canadian ice hockey player

- Born: December 12, 1912 Coronation, Alberta, Canada
- Died: November 12, 1989 (aged 76)
- Height: 6 ft 2 in (188 cm)
- Weight: 180 lb (82 kg; 12 st 12 lb)
- Position: Goaltender
- Shot: Left
- Played for: Calgary Stampeders; Winnipeg Monarchs
- Playing career: 1930–1943

Art Rice-Jones (December 12, 1912 - November 12, 1989) was a Canadian ice hockey goaltender who played for the 1935 World Champion Winnipeg Monarchs at Davos, Switzerland.

== Awards and achievements ==
- Turnbull Cup MJHL Championships (1931 & 1932)
- Memorial Cup Championship (1931)
- IIHF World Championship (1935)
- "Honoured Member" of the Manitoba Hockey Hall of Fame
