= St. Boniface Seals =

The St. Boniface Seals were a Canadian Junior Hockey Team in the Manitoba Junior Hockey League from 1934 to 1939.

In the 1937–38 season, the St. Boniface Seals beat the defending National Champion Winnipeg Monarchs for the Turnbull Cup before going on to defeat the Oshawa Generals to win the Memorial Cup championship. The 1937–38 team was inducted into the Manitoba Hockey Hall of Fame following this success.

The team was renamed to the St. Boniface Athletics in 1939 and played until 1945.

== Championships ==
- 1938 Memorial Cup Champions
- 1938 Turnbull Cup Champions

== NHL alumni ==
- William Meronek
- Terry Reardon
- Billy Reay
- Wally Stanowski

== 1937–38 team roster ==
- Fred Barker
- Herb Burron
- Pete Couture
- Fred Yedon
- J. Crawford
- George Gordon
- Herm Gruhn
- Ed Haverstock
- Bert Janke
- Mike Kryschuk
- Bill McGregor
- Jack Messett
- Cliff Murchison Jr.
- Cliff Murchison Sr.
- Frank Nicol
- Gil Paulley
- Billy Reay
- Doc Roy
- Geo. Schettler
- Wally Stanowski
- Jack Simpson
- Doug Webb
