= Jack Hughes (ice hockey, born 1890) =

Canadian ice hockey player and coach

- Born: January 30, 1890 Winnipeg, Manitoba, Canada
- Died: June 27, 1962 (aged 72)
- Position: Centre
Medal record
Men's Ice hockey
Gold medal – first place	1932 Lake Placid	Team competition

Jack Hughes (January 30, 1890 – June 27, 1962) was a Canadian ice hockey centreman from Winnipeg, Manitoba. He coached the Winnipeg Hockey Club to the Olympic title in 1932.

== Awards and achievements ==
- Allan Cup Championships (1913, 1928, & 1931)
- Turnbull Cup MJHL Championship (1931)
- Memorial Cup Championship (1931)
- "Honoured Member" of the Manitoba Hockey Hall of Fame
