= Norm Yellowlees =

Canadian ice hockey and soccer player

- Born: March 17, 1912 Winnipeg, Manitoba, Canada
- Died: October 14, 1991 (aged 79) North Vancouver, British Columbia, Canada
- Position: Center
- Played for: Winnipeg Senior Monarchs
- Playing career: 1929–1937

Norman François Yellowlees (March 17, 1912 – October 14, 1991) was a two-sport athlete from Manitoba. As a Canadian ice hockey centre, he won the 1935 World Hockey championship with the Winnipeg Senior Monarchs in Davos, Switzerland. He played soccer for the Winnipeg Manitoba Telephones.

== Awards and achievements ==
- Turnbull Cup MJHL Championship (1931)
- Memorial Cup Championship (1931)
- IIHF World Championship (1935)
- “Honoured Member” of the Manitoba Hockey Hall of Fame
