= Harry Neil =

Australian rules footballer (1882–1952)

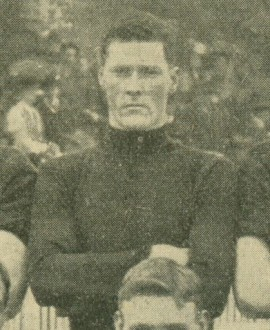
- Neil during his Richmond career

Personal information
- Full name: Howard Scott Neil
- Born: 13 September 1882; Break O'Day, Victoria
- Died: 11 October 1952 (aged 70); Mont Park, Victoria
- Original team: Collingwood Juniors
- Height: 178 cm (5 ft 10 in)
- Weight: 73 kg (161 lb)

Playing career^{1}
Years	Club	Games (Goals)
1904	Collingwood	4 (0)
1905–08	Prahran (VFA)	45 (0)
1908–10	Richmond	31 (0)
1910	Prahran (VFA)	9 (1)
1911	Brighton (VFA)	14 (2)
- ^{1} Playing statistics correct to the end of 1910.

Howard Scott "Harry" Neil (13 September 1882 – 11 October 1952) was an Australian rules footballer who played with Collingwood and Richmond in the Victorian Football League (VFL).

== Family ==
The son of John Isaac Neil (1846-), and Sarah Scott Neil (1860-1928), née Thompson, Howard Scott Neil was born at Break O'Day, Victoria on 13 September 1882.

He married Elsie Cecilia Hopkinson (1889-1970) in 1911. They had six children.

== Football ==
=== Collingwood (VFL) ===
He played in 4 senior games for Collingwood in 1904.

=== Prahran (VFA) ===
He transferred to Prahran in 1905, and played in his first senior match, against Footscray, on 10 June 1905.

=== Richmond (VFL) ===
In his three seasons with Richmond (1908-1910), he played in 31 senior matches.

=== Prahran (VFA) ===
In June 1910 he was cleared from Richmond to Prahran.

=== Brighton (VFA) ===
In May 1911, he was granted a permit to transfer from Prahran to Brighton.

== Death ==
He died at Mont Park, Victoria on 11 October 1952.
