= Winnipeg Monarchs (1930–1978) =

Manitoba former ice hockey team

- City: Winnipeg, Manitoba, Canada
- League: Manitoba Junior Hockey League
- Operated: 1930–1978

Franchise history
- 1930–1976: Winnipeg Monarchs
- 1976–1977: Assiniboine Park Monarchs
- 1977–1978: Winnipeg Monarchs
- 1978–1984: Fort Garry Blues
- 1984–2010: Winnipeg South Blues
- 2010–present: Winnipeg Blues

Championships
- Playoff championships: 1935, 1937, & 1946 Memorial Cup Champions

The Winnipeg Monarchs were a Canadian junior ice hockey team that competed in the Manitoba Junior Hockey League from 1930 to 1978.

== History ==
The Winnipeg Monarchs junior team was founded in 1930. From 1930 to 1936, they co-existed with the Winnipeg Monarchs senior hockey team. The junior Monarchs won the Memorial Cup as Canadian Junior Hockey Champions three times, in 1935, 1937 and 1946. In 1946, George Robertson scored the winning goal in the seventh game of the 1946 Memorial Cup Final before a sell out crowd at Maple Leaf Gardens in Toronto, Ontario. The Monarchs were also finalists in 1932, losing to Sudbury Wolves in the final, and 1951, losing to the Barrie Flyers.

In addition the three Memorial Cup titles, the team won ten Turnbull Cups as Manitoba Junior Hockey League champions and five Abbott Cups as Western Canadian junior hockey champions. The Monarchs are inducted into the Manitoba Hockey Hall of Fame in the team category four times (1935, 1937, 1946, 1951).

The club changed its name to the Assiniboine Park Monarchs in 1975, but reverted to the original name two years later. A group of Winnipeg businessmen purchased the Monarchs following the 1978 season and relocated it to Fort Garry in south Winnipeg. As part of the move, the team was renamed the Fort Garry Blues. The club is currently known as the Winnipeg Blues.

== Championships ==
- Turnbull Cup: 1932, 1935, 1937, 1945, 1946, 1948, 1951, 1952, 1955, 1957
- Abbott Cup: 1932, 1935, 1937, 1946, 1951
- Memorial Cup: 1935, 1937, 1946

The 1932 Winnipeg Monarchs won the 1932 Abbott Cup, defeating the Saskatoon Wesleys. They went on to lose the Memorial Cup to the Sudbury Cub Wolves at Shea's Amphitheater in Winnipeg. The roster was: Tony Lemay, Victor Lindquist, Romeo Rivers, Cam Shewan, Art Rice-Jones, Roy Hinkle, Norm Yellowlees, Archie Creighton, Albert Lemay, and Joe Rivers.

The 1935 Winnipeg Monarchs won their first Memorial Cup, in a best-of-three series held at Shea's Amphitheatre in Winnipeg, defeating Sudbury 2 games to 1.

The 1937 Winnipeg Monarchs were a small speedy team that surprised many on their way to the Abbott and Memorial Cup championships. Team Roster: Harry Neil (Coach), Bill Webber (Manager), Bert Pelletier (Trainer), Jack Atchison, Harvey Field, Dick Kowcinak, Lucien Martel, John McCreedy, Alf Pike, Paul Rheault, Denny Robinson, Ted Dent, Jack Fox, Pete Langelle, Remi Van Dale, Ami Clement, Zeke Farley, Bobby Summers (Stick Boy). After the 1937 Memorial Cup, the Monarchs played in an international series arranged by the Canadian Amateur Hockey Association to determine a world's amateur champion. The tournament was shortened due to poor attendance, and the game between Winnipeg and the Hershey Bears was cancelled as both teams went home early.

The 1946 Winnipeg Monarchs defeated the Edmonton Canadians to capture the Abbott Cup. They went on to beat the Toronto St. Michael's Majors 4-2 in the seventh and deciding game of the Memorial Cup. Roster: Jack Gibson, Tom Rockey, Laurie May, Al Buchanan (Captain), George Robertson, Harry Taylor, Don "Red" McRae, Clint Albright, Gord Fashoway, Eddie Marchant, Tom "Tank" Kummerfield, Hy Beatty, Cam Millar, Bill Tindall, Dunc Daniels, Gord Scott, Ted Chitty, Walter Monson (Coach), Pat Lyon (GM), Floyd Howe (President), Ed Haverstock (Trainer), Bill Windatt (Equipment Manager).

The 1951 Winnipeg Monarchs won the Abbott Cup by defeating the Regina Pats. They went on to lose the Memorial Cup to the Barrie Flyers.

== Season-by-season record ==
Note: GP = Games Played, W = Wins, L = Losses, T = Ties, OTL = Overtime Losses, GF = Goals for, GA = Goals against

Season	GP	W	L	T	OTL	GF	GA	Points	Finish	Playoffs
1930-31	9	7	2	0	-	29	15	14	1st MJHL	
1931-32	12	11	0	1	-	31	14	23	1st WinJHL	Won League, Won AbC
1932-33	10	2	8	0	-	18	34	4	3rd MJHL-S	
1933-34	14	1	12	1	-	--	--	3	9th MJHL	
1934-35	13	9	3	1	-	65	33	29	3rd MJHL	Won League, Won AbC, Won MC
1935-36	15	6	8	1	-	56	47	13	6th MJHL	
1936-37	16	12	2	2	-	74	32	26	2nd MJHL	Won League, Won AbC, Won MC
1937-38	23	13	6	4	-	70	55	30	3rd MJHL	
1938-39	22	13	6	3	-	105	81	29	3rd MJHL	
1939-40	24	16	6	2	-	108	68	34	1st MJHL	
1940-41	12	3	9	0	-	52	89	6	6th MJHL	
1941-42	18	8	10	0	-	92	127	16	6th MJHL	
1942-43	13	7	5	1	-	65	72	15	4th MJHL	
1943-44	10	10	0	0	-	58	26	18	1st MJHL	
1944-45	8	8	0	0	-	72	13	16	1st MJHL	Won League
1945-46	10	8	1	1	-	59	28	17	1st MJHL	Won League, AbC, Won MC
1946-47	15	12	3	0	-	94	54	24	2nd MJHL	
1947-48	23	11	10	2	-	123	103	24	3rd MJHL	Won League
1948-49	30	11	19	0	-	132	150	22	3rd MJHL	
1949-50	36	16	20	0	-	142	148	32	2nd MJHL	
1950-51	36	26	9	1	-	208	128	53	2nd MJHL	Won League, Won AbC
1951-52	36	26	10	0	-	155	111	52	1st MJHL	Won League
1952-53	36	16	19	1	-	132	152	33	3rd MJHL	
1953-54	36	13	23	0	-	147	172	26	4th MJHL	
1954-55	32	20	10	2	-	173	141	42	1st MJHL	Won League
1955-56	24	16	6	2	-	153	108	34	1st MJHL	
1956-57	29	17	8	4	-	175	146	38	2nd MJHL	Won League
1957-58	30	18	11	1	-	167	127	37	1st MJHL	
1958-59	30	5	25	0	-	89	176	10	5th MJHL	
1959-60	32	5	27	0	-	90	221	10	5th MJHL	
1960-61	32	6	25	1	-	107	205	13	5th MJHL	
1961-62	40	20	16	4	-	143	138	44	2nd MJHL	
1962-63	39	15	21	3	-	141	177	33	3rd MJHL	
1963-64	30	13	15	2	-	112	124	28	4th MJHL	
1964-65	45	19	21	5	-	159	165	43	3rd MJHL	
1965-66	48	20	24	4	-	198	197	44	4th MJHL	
1966-67	57	21	34	2	-	235	316	46	4th MJHL	
1967-68	36	20	13	3	-	200	157	43	1st MJHL	
1968-69	34	17	12	5	-	145	157	39	3rd MJHL	
1969-70	34	17	12	5	-	136	120	39	3rd MJHL	
1970-71	48	16	24	8	-	210	221	40	7th MJHL	
1971-72	48	9	38	1	-	163	284	19	8th MJHL	
1972-73	48	23	25	0	-	261	254	46	5th MJHL	
1973-74	47	14	33	0	-	180	251	28	8th MJHL	
1974-75	48	19	29	0	-	244	286	38	7th MJHL	
1975-76	52	27	24	1	-	253	255	55	6th MJHL	
1976-77	51	21	30	0	-	204	242	44	8th MJHL	
1977-78	52	12	38	2	-	194	323	26	9th MJHL	
