= Abbott Cup =

Western Canada junior ice hockey award (1919–1999)

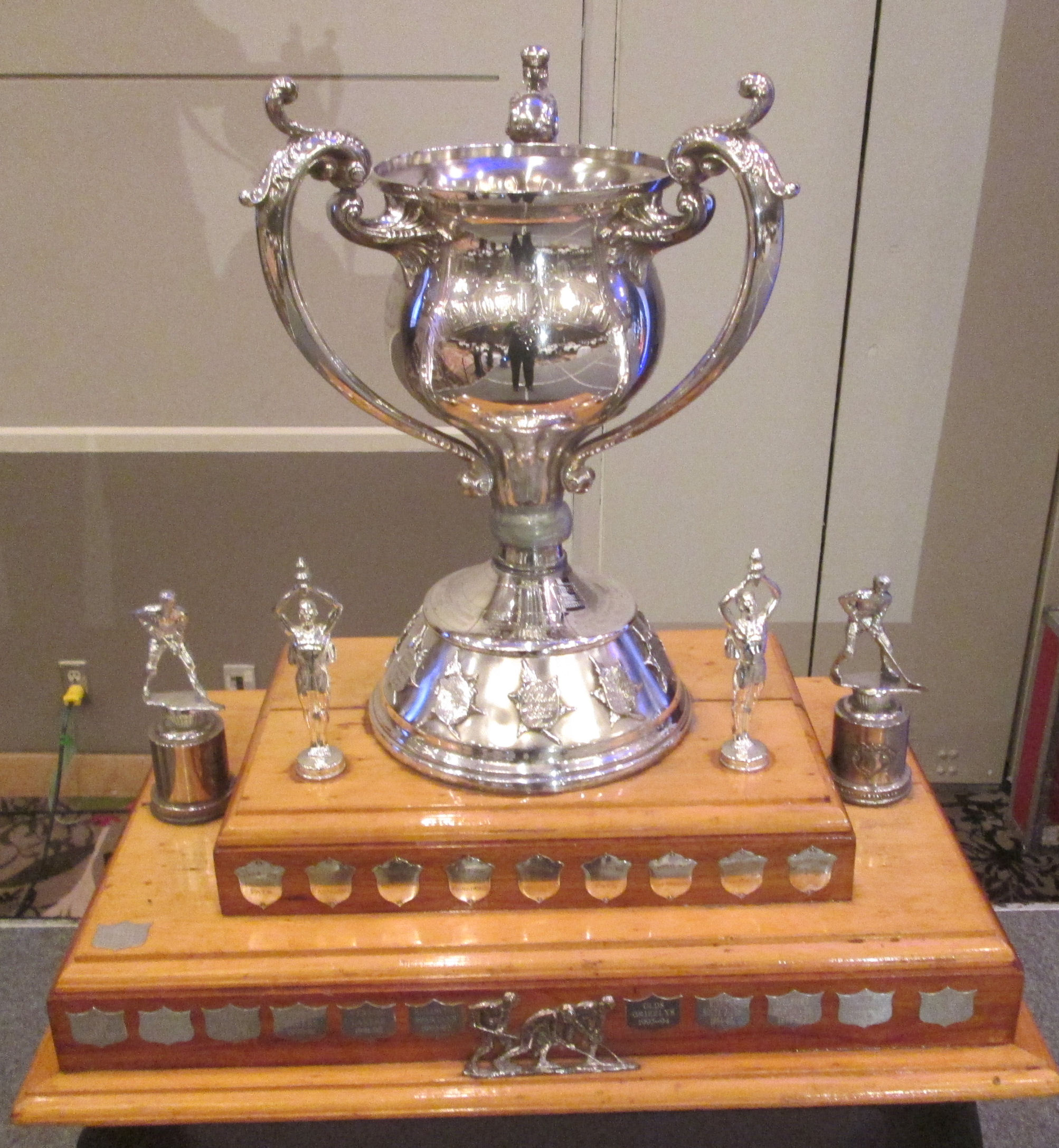
- Sport: Ice hockey
- Awarded for: Western Canadian Junior "A" champion
- Country: Canada

History
- First award: 1919
- Final award: 1999
- Most wins: Regina Patricias/Pats; 11 wins

The Abbott Memorial Cup, commonly referred to as the Abbott Cup, was awarded annually from 1919 through 1999 to the Junior "A" ice hockey Champion for Western Canada.

The Cup was named after Captain E.L. (Hick) Abbott who was a noted hockey player in Western Canada. He captained the Regina Victorias when it won the (pre-Memorial Cup) Junior Championship of Canada in 1913 and 1914. Captain Abbott died in active service in the First World War and the trophy was presented in his memory in 1919 by the Saskatchewan Amateur Hockey Association.

The concept of a Western Canada Junior A Championship was briefly continued from 2013 to 2017 with the creation of the Western Canada Cup.

== History ==
The Abbott Cup was a playoff round, a best of seven game series, between the British Columbia/Alberta Interprovincial Champions and the Saskatchewan/Manitoba Interprovincial Champions. The Abbott Cup winner would then play off against the Eastern Canadian Champions, the winner of the George Richardson Memorial Trophy, for the Memorial Cup signifying the National Championship.

In 1934 Junior "A" hockey was divided into Junior "A" and "B", with the Abbott Cup staying with the Junior "A" level. The winner of the Abbott Cup still earned the right to compete for the national Memorial Cup. (Starting in 1983, a Junior "B" Western Canadian Championship was established with the Keystone Cup.)

In 1971 Junior "A" hockey was divided into Major Junior (Tier I) and Junior "A" (Tier II), with the Abbott Cup again staying with the Tier II Junior "A" level. As the Memorial Cup national championship was now reserved for the Major Junior level, the Abbott Cup winner now represented the West in the 'Tier II' Centennial Cup National Championship. (The Major Junior teams in Western Canada now compete for the Western Hockey League's Ed Chynoweth Cup, earning the right to compete for their national Memorial Cup.)

Starting in 1991, because of the realignment of regions and format for the Centennial Cup, the winners of the Doyle Cup and the Anavet Cup would go straight to the National Championship competition rather than hold a separate competition for the western Abbott Cup. During the Centennial Cup (later Royal Bank Cup) national competition, the winner of the game between the Doyle Cup winner and the Anavet Cup winner would also receive the Abbott Cup. Since then, the Abbott Cup has diminished in attention, which led to the retirement of the Abbott Cup after it had been awarded to the Vernon Vipers in 1999. It can now be found in the Hockey Hall of Fame.

The Abbott Cup Western Canadian Junior "A" Champion went on to win the National Junior "A" Championship 40 times over 81 years:

Junior "A" Memorial Cup - 19 times in 52 competitions between 1919 and 1970
Tier II Junior "A" Centennial Cup/Royal Bank Cup - 21 times in 29 competitions between 1971 and 1999

The franchise to win the most Abbott Cups was the Regina Patricias/Pats, with 11. Second were the Edmonton Oil Kings, with 8. The most consecutive wins by a franchise is 7, for the Edmonton Oil Kings, from 1960 through 1966. The Prince Albert Raiders follow with 3 consecutive cups, from 1977 through 1979.

The province whose representatives won the most Abbott Cups was Saskatchewan, with 25. Manitoba representatives won 21 cups, Alberta won 18, British Columbia won 13, and Ontario teams playing in the Manitoba league won 4 cups. The most consecutive wins by the representatives of the same province is 7, for Alberta, from 1960 through 1966. British Columbia follows with 5 consecutive cups, from 1989 through 1993.

== Champions ==
=== 1919 to 1934 ===
Presented by the Saskatchewan Amateur Hockey Association to the best Junior "A" team in Western Canada.

1919 Regina Patricia HC
1920 Selkirk Fishermen
1921 Winnipeg Junior Falcons*
1922 Regina Patricia
1923 University of Manitoba Bisons*
1924 Calgary Canadians
1925 Regina Pats*
1926 Calgary Canadians*
1927 Port Arthur West Ends
1928 Regina Monarchs*
1929 Elmwood Millionaires
1930 Regina Pats*
1931 Elmwood Millionaires*
1932 Winnipeg Monarchs
1933 Regina Pats
1934 Edmonton Athletic Club

(*) Denotes teams that went on to win the national championship Memorial Cup.

=== 1935 to 1970 ===
Starting in 1935, Junior "B" franchises were no longer eligible to compete for the Abbott Cup.

1935 Winnipeg Monarchs*
1936 Saskatoon Wesleys
1937 Winnipeg Monarchs*
1938 St. Boniface Seals*
1939 Edmonton Athletic Club Roamers
1940 Kenora Thistles
1941 Winnipeg Rangers*
1942 Portage Terriers*
1943 Winnipeg Rangers*
1944 Trail Smoke Eaters
1945 Moose Jaw Canucks
1946 Winnipeg Monarchs*
1947 Moose Jaw Canucks
1948 Port Arthur West End Bruins*
1949 Brandon Wheat Kings
1950 Regina Pats (WCJHL)
1951 Winnipeg Monarchs
1952 Regina Pats (WCJHL)
1953 St. Boniface Canadiens
1954 Edmonton Oil Kings (WCJHL)
1955 Regina Pats (WCJHL)
1956 Regina Pats (WCJHL)
1957 Flin Flon Bombers* (SJHL)
1958 Regina Pats (SJHL)
1959 Winnipeg Braves*
1960 Edmonton Oil Kings
1961 Edmonton Oil Kings
1962 Edmonton Oil Kings
1963 Edmonton Oil Kings*
1964 Edmonton Oil Kings
1965 Edmonton Oil Kings
1966 Edmonton Oil Kings*
1967 Port Arthur Marrs
1968 Estevan Bruins
1969 Regina Pats
1970 Weyburn Red Wings

(*) Denotes teams that went on to win the national championship Memorial Cup.

=== 1971 to 1990 ===
Starting in 1971, only Junior "A" (formerly Tier II) clubs competed for the Abbott Cup.

1971 Red Deer Rustlers (AJHL)*
1972 Red Deer Rustlers (AJHL)
1973 Portage Terriers (MJHL)*
1974 Selkirk Steelers (MJHL)*
1975 Spruce Grove Mets (AJHL)*
1976 Spruce Grove Mets (AJHL)
1977 Prince Albert Raiders (SJHL)*
1978 Prince Albert Raiders (SJHL)
1979 Prince Albert Raiders (SJHL)*
1980 Red Deer Rustlers (AJHL)*
1981 Prince Albert Raiders (SJHL)*
1982 Prince Albert Raiders (SJHL)*
1983 Abbotsford Flyers (BCJHL)
1984 Weyburn Red Wings (SJHL)*
1985 Penticton Knights (BCJHL)
1986 Penticton Knights (BCJHL)*
1987 Richmond Sockeyes (BCJHL)*
1988 Notre Dame Hounds(SJHL)*
1989 Vernon Lakers (BCJHL)
1990 New Westminster Royals (BCJHL)

(*) Denotes teams that went on to win the national championship Centennial Cup/Royal Bank Cup.

=== 1991 to 1999 ===
Awarded to the winner of the round robin game between the Doyle and ANAVET champions at the Centennial Cup/Royal Bank Cup

1991 Vernon Lakers (BCJHL)*
1992 Vernon Lakers (BCJHL)
1993 Kelowna Spartans (BCJHL)*
1994 Olds Grizzlys (AJHL)*
1995 Winnipeg South Blues (MJHL)*
1996 Melfort Mustangs (SJHL)*
1997 South Surrey Eagles (BCHL)
1998 South Surrey Eagles (BCHL)*
1999 Vernon Vipers (BCHL)*

(*) Denotes teams that went on to win the national championship Centennial Cup/Royal Bank Cup.
