= List of MJHL seasons =

This is a list of Manitoba Junior Hockey League seasons.

== Memorial Cup era (1918–1970) ==
1918–19 | 1919–20 |
1920–21 | 1921–22 | 1922–23 | 1923–24 | 1924–25 | 1925–26 | 1926–27 | 1927–28 | 1928–29 | 1929–30 |
1930–31 | 1931–32 | 1932–33 | 1933–34 | 1934–35 | 1935–36 | 1936–37 | 1937–38 | 1938–39 | 1939–40 |
1940–41 | 1941–42 | 1942–43 | 1943–44 | 1944–45 | 1945–46 | 1946–47 | 1947–48 | 1948–49 | 1949–50 |
1950–51 | 1951–52 | 1952–53 | 1953–54 | 1954–55 | 1955–56 | 1956–57 | 1957–58 | 1958–59 | 1959–60 |
1960–61 | 1961–62 | 1962–63 | 1963–64 | 1964–65 | 1965–66 | 1966–67 | 1967–68 | 1968–69 | 1969–70 |

== Modern era (1970–present) ==
The following is a list of seasons following the reorganization of junior hockey in Canada.
1970–71 | 1971–72 | 1972–73 | 1973–74 | 1974–75 | 1975–76 | 1976–77 | 1977–78 | 1978–79 | 1979–80 |
1980–81 | 1981–82 | 1982–83 | 1983–84 | 1984–85 | 1985–86 | 1986–87 | 1987–88 | 1988–89 | 1989–90 |
1990–91 | 1991–92 | 1992–93 | 1993-94 | 1994–95 | 1995–96 | 1996–97 | 1997–98 | 1998–99 | 1999–2000 |
2000-01 | 2001-02 | 2002-03 | 2003-04 | 2004-05 | 2005-06 | 2006-07 | 2007–08 | 2008–09 | 2009–10 |
2010–11 | 2011–12 | 2012–13 | 2013–14 | 2014–15 | 2015–16 | 2016–17 | 2017–18 | 2018–19 | 2019–20 |
2020–21 | 2021–22 | 2022–23 | 2023–24 | 2024–25 | 2025–26
