= Cam Connor =

Canadian ice hockey player (born 1954)

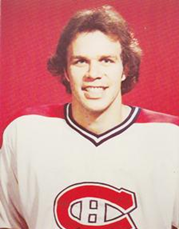
- Born: August 10, 1954 (age 72) Winnipeg, Manitoba, Canada
- Height: 6 ft 2 in (188 cm)
- Weight: 200 lb (91 kg; 14 st 4 lb)
- Position: Right wing
- Shot: Left
- Played for: WHA; Phoenix Roadrunners; Houston Aeros; NHL; Montreal Canadiens; Edmonton Oilers; New York Rangers
- NHL draft: 5th overall, 1974; Montreal Canadiens
- WHA draft: 4th overall, 1974; Phoenix Roadrunners
- Playing career: 1974–1983

Cameron Duncan Connor (born August 10, 1954) is a Canadian former professional ice hockey forward and a Stanley Cup winner.

Connor was inducted into the Manitoba Hockey Hall of Fame in October 2015.

== Early life ==
Connor grew up best friends with WWE Hall of Fame wrestler Rowdy Roddy Piper, and they stayed friends until Piper's death.

== Hockey career ==
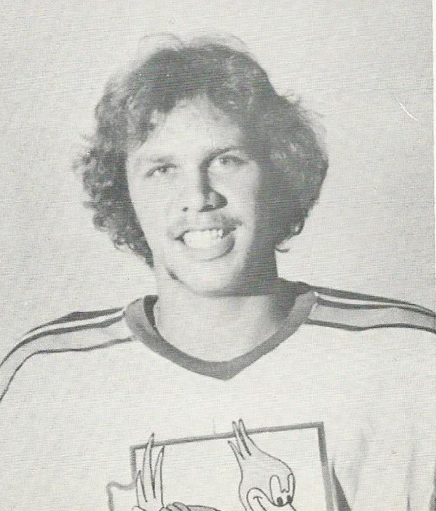
Connor in 1975 for Phoenix Roadrunners

In Connor's last year of junior hockey, he was named captain of the Flin Flon Bombers in the WCHL and scored 47 goals, 44 assists in 65 games, along with 376 penalty minutes. Connor won the Rookie of the Year Award. He claims a lot of this success is due to his coach Pat Ginnell having the confidence in him to make him captain.

Because of Connor's junior success, he was selected by the Montreal Canadiens in the first round, fifth overall, of the 1974 NHL amateur draft. Connor was also selected by the Phoenix Roadrunners in the first round, fourth overall in the 1974 WHA Secret Amateur Draft. The Roadrunners offered Connor a lot of money, and he ended up choosing the WHA instead of the Canadiens, a move he says he now regrets. Montreal coach Scotty Bowman offered to beat the WHA's offer, but Connor had already given his word and did not want to go back on it. Connor began his World Hockey Association career with the Phoenix Roadrunners before a stint with the Houston Aeros where he played with Gordie Howe and his sons Marty and Mark Howe. He found great success in the WHA and was selected to the 1977 All Star Team. When the Houston Aeros folded he joined the Montreal Canadiens in 1978.

Coached by Scotty Bowman, during the Habs' dynasty years, Montreal's roster was a tough line-up to crack, but Connor did suit up for 23 games that season. He is remembered for his double OT playoff goal to win game three against the Toronto Maple Leafs.

During his time with the Habs, Connor was plagued by injuries and severe food poisoning, and league rules said Connor did not play enough playoff games to have his name engraved on the Cup. His teammates rallied around him and said if his name was not on the Cup, none of their names should be on the Cup. The league reversed their decision and his name was included on the Stanley Cup.

For the Edmonton Oilers' first year in the NHL, they selected Connor as the number one pick in the expansion draft. He played with a rookie Wayne Gretzky, making him one of two players to play with both Gretzky and Gordie Howe (Houston Aeros). Connor was coached by Glen Sather, and was traded to the New York Rangers before the end of that season, learning about his trade over the radio.

Connor battled chronic injuries during his three seasons with the Rangers. He performed well in the 1982 playoffs, scoring 4 goals in 10 games. He broke his back in two spots and ended his career with the Tulsa Oilers.

== After hockey ==
Connor became the assistant coach of the American Hockey League's New Haven Nighthawks following his playing career.

For the first Heritage Classic, Connor was selected to the Montreal Canadiens legends team. He was one of two players present to have played on both the Oilers and Canadiens.

Connor was inducted into the Manitoba Hockey Hall of Fame in 2016.

Connor has been seen at charity events, does motivational speaking, and hosts a podcast, "View from the Penalty Box".

Connor competed on the All Athletes All Star edition of Wipeout Canada on April 24, 2011.

== Records and achievements ==
- Stanley Cup Champion with the Montreal Canadiens (1978–79)
- WCHL Rookie of Year 1973-74 Flin Flon Bombers
- WCHL All-Star Game 1973-74
- Selected to WHA All Star team in 1977
- Adams Cup 1983-84 CHL champion as a member of the Tulsa Oilers team coached by Tom Webster
- Represented the Montreal Canadiens legends team at the historic outdoor Heritage Classic hockey game in 2003.
- Inducted into the Manitoba Hockey Hall of Fame

== Career statistics ==
			Regular season					Playoffs
Season	Team	League	GP	G	A	Pts	PIM	GP	G	A	Pts	PIM
1971–72	St. Boniface Saints	MJHL	32	4	10	14	97	—	—	—	—	—
1971–72	Winnipeg Jets	WCHL	5	0	4	4	4	—	—	—	—	—
1972–73	St. Boniface Saints	MJHL	29	11	8	19	161	—	—	—	—	—
1972–73	Winnipeg Jets	WCHL	14	3	1	4	35	—	—	—	—	—
1973–74	Flin Flon Bombers	WCHL	65	47	44	91	376	7	4	9	13	28
1974–75	Phoenix Roadrunners	WHA	57	9	19	28	168	5	0	0	0	2
1975–76	Phoenix Roadrunners	WHA	73	18	21	39	295	5	1	0	1	21
1976–77	Houston Aeros	WHA	76	35	32	67	224	11	3	4	7	47
1977–78	Houston Aeros	WHA	68	21	16	37	217	2	1	0	1	22
1978–79	Montreal Canadiens	NHL	22	1	3	4	39	8	1	0	1	0
1979–80	Edmonton Oilers	NHL	38	7	13	20	136	—	—	—	—	—
1979–80	Houston Apollos	CHL	5	1	1	2	20	—	—	—	—	—
1979–80	New York Rangers	NHL	12	0	3	3	37	2	0	0	0	2
1980–81	New York Rangers	NHL	15	1	3	4	44	—	—	—	—	—
1980–81	New Haven Nighthawks	AHL	61	33	28	61	243	4	0	2	2	4
1981–82	Springfield Indians	AHL	78	17	34	51	195	—	—	—	—	—
1981–82	New York Rangers	NHL	—	—	—	—	—	10	4	0	4	4
1982–83	New York Rangers	NHL	1	0	0	0	0	—	—	—	—	—
1982–83	Tulsa Oilers	CHL	3	2	2	4	0	—	—	—	—	—
1983–84	Tulsa Oilers	CHL	64	18	32	50	218	6	1	1	2	34
WHA totals			274	83	88	171	904	23	5	4	9	92
NHL totals			89	9	22	31	256	20	5	0	5	6

Preceded by Bob Gainey	Montreal Canadiens first-round draft pick 1974	Succeeded by Doug Risebrough
