= Ron Low =

Canadian ice hockey player, coach (born 1950)

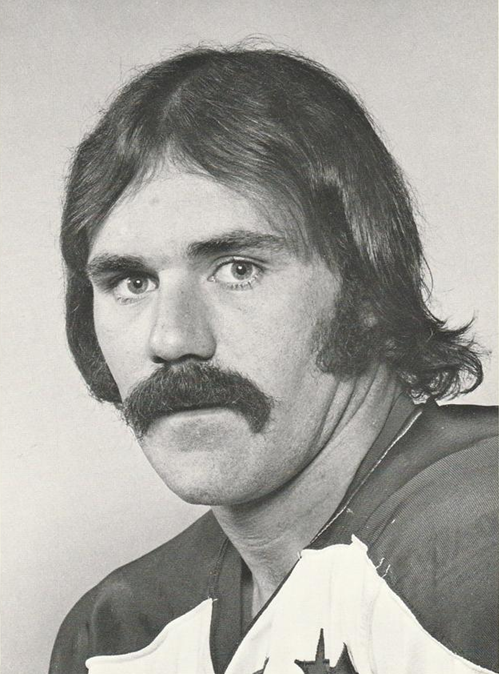
- Born: June 21, 1950 (age 76) Birtle, Manitoba, Canada
- Height: 6 ft 1 in (185 cm)
- Weight: 205 lb (93 kg; 14 st 9 lb)
- Position: Goaltender
- Caught: Left
- Played for: Toronto Maple Leafs; Washington Capitals; Detroit Red Wings; Quebec Nordiques; Edmonton Oilers; New Jersey Devils
- Coached for: Edmonton Oilers; New York Rangers
- NHL draft: 103rd overall, 1970; Toronto Maple Leafs
- Playing career: 1970–1985
- Coaching career: 1989–2007

Ronald Albert Low (born June 21, 1950) is a Canadian former ice hockey goaltender and coach. He played in the National Hockey League with six teams between 1972 and 1985. After retiring he became a coach and was head coach of Edmonton Oilers from 1995 to 1999 and the New York Rangers from 2000 to 2002. Low grew up in Foxwarren, Manitoba.

== Playing career ==
Low played for two years with the Dauphin Kings of the Manitoba Junior Hockey League (MJHL) before turning pro, leading the Kings to the Manitoba championship and the Memorial Cup playoffs each year.

Originally selected in the 1970 NHL Amateur Draft by the Toronto Maple Leafs, Low only played one season with Toronto before he was left exposed in the 1974 NHL Expansion Draft where he was claimed by the Washington Capitals. He spent three seasons with the Capitals and was the first goalie to get a shutout for the team on February 16, 1975, against the Kansas City Scouts.

After being traded to and spending two seasons in the Detroit Red Wings organization, he was claimed by the Quebec Nordiques in the 1979 NHL Expansion Draft. Low was traded to the Edmonton Oilers after playing only 15 games with the Nordiques. He was traded to the New Jersey Devils in 1983, where he completed his NHL career at the end of the 1984–85 NHL season.

== Coaching career ==
After playing six games with the Nova Scotia Oilers of the American Hockey League, he became an assistant coach for the team. During the 1987 season, Low was promoted to assistant coach with the Edmonton Oilers. In 1988, became the head coach of the Nova Scotia Oilers and would remain in that position until 1989 when the team was renamed the Cape Breton Oilers. In 1990, Low was named an assistant coach with the Edmonton Oilers. Seven years later he became the head coach of the Oilers, a position he held for four seasons. After coaching the Houston Aeros for a season, he was named the head coach of the New York Rangers; however, his tenure would last for only two seasons as the team's dismal performance led to regular chants of Low must go! at home games as the 2001–2002 season's second half wore on. At the time of his dismissal by general manager Glen Sather, the Rangers under Low had a combined record of 69-81-9-5, finished 4th in the Atlantic Division both years, and failed to qualify for the playoffs either year, marking a fifth consecutive year where the team failed to make the playoffs. After being relieved of his coaching duties with the Rangers, he would remain in the organization as a scout until 2004. During the summer of 2004, he became a scout and goaltender coach for the Ottawa Senators. In August 2007, Low was promoted to the position of assistant coach of the Ottawa Senators. He was fired from this position on February 27, 2008.

He won the Stanley Cup in 1987 and 1990 as an assistant coach with the Edmonton Oilers.

== Personal life ==
On March 17, 2010, Low was mugged in downtown Calgary. He had just left after meeting with fellow former Oiler Dave Hunter when the attack occurred. Low was able to make it back to his hotel and call an ambulance which brought him to Foothills Hospital where he required surgery for his organs damaged in the attack.

== Career statistics ==
=== Regular season and playoffs ===
Bold indicates led league

			Regular season									Playoffs
Season	Team	League	GP	W	L	T	MIN	GA	SO	GAA	SV%	GP	W	L	MIN	GA	SO	GAA	SV%
1967–68	Dauphin Kings	MJHL	—	—	—	—	—	—	—	—	—	—	—	—	—	—	—	—	—
1967–68	Winnipeg Jets	WCHL	16	—	—	—	960	92	0	5.75	—	—	—	—	—	—	—	—	—
1968–69	Dauphin Kings	MJHL	—	—	—	—	—	—	—	—	—	—	—	—	—	—	—	—	—
1968–69	Dauphin Kings	M-Cup	—	—	—	—	—	—	—	—	—	12	7	5	730	55	0	4.52	—
1969–70	Dauphin Kings	MJHL	33	—	—	—	2001	119	0	3.57	—	—	—	—	—	—	—	—	—
1969–70	Dauphin Kings	M-Cup	—	—	—	—	—	—	—	—	—	6	2	4	293	26	1	5.32	—
1970–71	Jacksonville Rockets	EHL	49	—	—	—	2940	293	1	5.98	—	—	—	—	—	—	—	—	—
1970–71	Tulsa Oilers	CHL	4	—	—	—	192	11	0	3.44	—	—	—	—	—	—	—	—	—
1971–72	Tulsa Oilers	CHL	43	21	18	2	2428	135	1	3.33	—	8	—	—	474	15	1	1.89	—
1971–72	Richmond Robins	AHL	1	1	0	0	60	2	0	2.00	—	—	—	—	—	—	—	—	—
1972–73	Toronto Maple Leafs	NHL	42	12	24	4	2339	152	1	3.90	.881	—	—	—	—	—	—	—	—
1973–74	Tulsa Oilers	CHL	56	23	23	8	3213	169	1	3.16	—	—	—	—	—	—	—	—	—
1974–75	Washington Capitals	NHL	48	8	**36**	2	2587	**235**	1	5.45	.855	—	—	—	—	—	—	—	—
1975–76	Washington Capitals	NHL	45	6	31	2	2285	208	0	5.46	.854	—	—	—	—	—	—	—	—
1976–77	Washington Capitals	NHL	54	16	27	5	2910	188	0	3.88	.881	—	—	—	—	—	—	—	—
1977–78	Detroit Red Wings	NHL	32	9	12	9	1813	102	1	3.37	.886	4	1	3	240	17	0	4.25	.879
1978–79	Kansas City Red Wings	CHL	63	33	28	2	3795	244	0	3.86	—	5	1	4	237	15	0	3.80	—
1979–80	Quebec Nordiques	NHL	15	5	7	2	826	51	0	3.71	.884	—	—	—	—	—	—	—	—
1979–80	Syracuse Firebirds	AHL	15	5	9	1	905	70	0	4.64	—	—	—	—	—	—	—	—	—
1979–80	Edmonton Oilers	NHL	11	8	2	1	650	37	0	3.42	.897	3	0	3	212	12	0	3.40	.906
1980–81	Edmonton Oilers	NHL	24	5	13	3	1258	93	0	4.44	.856	—	—	—	—	—	—	—	—
1980–81	Wichita Wind	CHL	2	0	2	0	120	10	0	5.00	—	—	—	—	—	—	—	—	—
1981–82	Edmonton Oilers	NHL	29	17	7	1	1554	100	0	3.86	.874	—	—	—	—	—	—	—	—
1982–83	Edmonton Oilers	NHL	3	0	1	0	104	10	0	5.78	.815	—	—	—	—	—	—	—	—
1982–83	Moncton Alpines	AHL	6	1	4	1	365	22	1	3.62	.877	—	—	—	—	—	—	—	—
1982–83	New Jersey Devils	NHL	11	2	7	1	604	41	0	4.37	.858	—	—	—	—	—	—	—	—
1983–84	New Jersey Devils	NHL	44	8	25	4	2211	161	0	4.37	.858	—	—	—	—	—	—	—	—
1984–85	New Jersey Devils	NHL	26	6	11	4	1325	85	1	3.85	.864	—	—	—	—	—	—	—	—
NHL totals			382	96	192	34	20,466	1463	4	4.29	.869	7	1	6	452	29	0	3.85	.892

== Coaching record ==
Team	Year	Regular season							Postseason
Team	Year	G	W	L	T	OTL	Pts	Division rank	Result
Edmonton Oilers	1994–95	13	5	7	1	—	11	5th in Pacific	Missed Playoffs
Edmonton Oilers	1995–96	82	30	44	8	—	68	5th in Pacific	Missed Playoffs
Edmonton Oilers	1996–97	82	36	37	9	—	81	3rd in Pacific	Lost in Second round (COL)
Edmonton Oilers	1997–98	82	35	37	10	—	80	3rd in Pacific	Lost in Second round (DAL)
Edmonton Oilers	1998–99	82	33	37	12	—	78	2nd in Northwest	Lost in First round (DAL)
New York Rangers	2000–01	82	33	43	5	1	74	4th in Atlantic	Missed Playoffs
New York Rangers	2001–02	82	36	38	4	4	80	4th in Atlantic	Missed Playoffs
NHL totals		505	208	243	49	5			

== Awards and achievements ==
- Turnbull Cup MJHL Championships (1969 & 1970)
- EHL South Rookie of the Year (1971)
- CHL Second All-Star Team (1974)
- CHL First All-Star Team (1979)
- CHL Most Valuable Player (1979)
- NHL – Stanley Cup (Edmonton) (1987 & 1990)
- Honoured Member of the Manitoba Hockey Hall of Fame

== See also ==
- List of NHL head coaches

Preceded by Doug Palazzari	Winner of the Tommy Ivan Trophy; 1978–79	Succeeded by Doug Palazzari
Preceded by George Burnett	Head coach of the Edmonton Oilers; 1995–99	Succeeded by Kevin Lowe
Preceded by John Tortorella	Head coach of the New York Rangers; 2000–02	Succeeded by Bryan Trottier
