= Mike Korney =

Canadian ice hockey player (born 1953)

- Born: September 15, 1953 (age 71); Dauphin, Manitoba, Canada
- Height: 6 ft 3 in (191 cm)
- Weight: 220 lb (100 kg; 15 st 10 lb)
- Position: Defence
- Shot: Right
- Played for: Detroit Red Wings; New York Rangers
- NHL draft: 59th overall, 1973; Detroit Red Wings
- WHA draft: 83rd overall, 1973; Vancouver Blazers
- Playing career: 1973–1981

Michael Wayne Korney (born September 15, 1953) is a Canadian retired professional ice hockey player. He played in 77 games in the National Hockey League with the Detroit Red Wings and New York Rangers between 1973 and 1978.

Mike played 2 years for his hometown Dauphin Kings, winning Manitoba in his final year (1971–72), before moving up to the Western Canada Hockey League with the Winnipeg Jets. He was selected by the Detroit Red Wings in 4th round (59th overall) in the 1973 NHL Amateur Draft.

== Career statistics ==
=== Regular season and playoffs ===
			Regular season					Playoffs
Season	Team	League	GP	G	A	Pts	PIM	GP	G	A	Pts	PIM
1970–71	Dauphin Kings	MJHL	45	15	31	46	38	—	—	—	—	—
1971–72	Dauphin Kings	MJHL	41	16	33	49	64	—	—	—	—	—
1972–73	Winnipeg Jets	WCHL	68	20	29	49	92	—	—	—	—	—
1973–74	Detroit Red Wings	NHL	2	0	0	0	0	—	—	—	—	—
1973–74	Virginia Wings	AHL	19	1	1	2	15	—	—	—	—	—
1973–74	Port Huron Wings	IHL	7	1	0	1	9	—	—	—	—	—
1973–74	London Lions	Intl	31	15	10	25	33	—	—	—	—	—
1974–75	Detroit Red Wings	NHL	30	8	2	10	18	—	—	—	—	—
1974–75	Virginia Wings	AHL	2	0	0	0	0	—	—	—	—	—
1974–75	Providence Reds	AHL	3	1	0	1	0	—	—	—	—	—
1974–75	Springfield Falcons	AHL	1	0	0	0	0	—	—	—	—	—
1974–75	Hampton Gulls	SHL	13	0	1	1	35	—	—	—	—	—
1975–76	Detroit Red Wings	NHL	27	1	7	8	23	—	—	—	—	—
1975–76	New Haven Nighthawks	AHL	21	8	9	17	31	—	—	—	—	—
1975–76	Oklahoma City Blazers	CHL	18	8	6	14	20	4	0	0	0	2
1976–77	Kansas City Blues	CHL	74	17	24	41	82	10	1	6	7	13
1977–78	Maine Mariners	AHL	15	2	4	6	20	—	—	—	—	—
1977–78	Milwaukee Admirals	IHL	3	0	0	0	2	—	—	—	—	—
1977–78	Salt Lake Golden Eagles	CHL	54	12	8	20	75	6	2	4	6	6
1978–79	New York Rangers	NHL	18	0	1	1	18	—	—	—	—	—
1978–79	New Haven Nighthawks	AHL	5	1	3	4	0	—	—	—	—	—
1978–79	Tulsa Oilers	CHL	11	0	9	9	36	—	—	—	—	—
1979–80	Syracuse Firebirds	AHL	73	11	16	27	87	4	1	2	3	18
1980–81	Cranbrook Royals	WIHL	—	—	—	—	—	—	—	—	—	—
1980–81	Trail Smoke Eaters	WIHL	15	1	10	11	24	—	—	—	—	—
1981–82	Cranbrook Royals	WIHL	—	—	—	—	—	—	—	—	—	—
1981–82	Cranbrook Royals	Al-Cup	—	—	—	—	—	5	1	6	7	2
AHL totals			139	24	33	57	153	4	1	2	3	18
NHL totals			77	9	10	19	59	—	—	—	—	—
