= Don Larway =

Canadian ice hockey player (1954–2019)

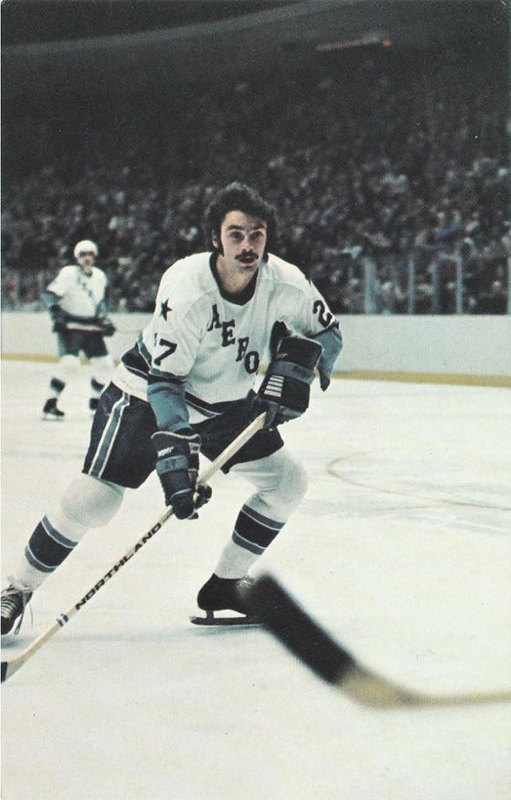
- Born: February 12, 1954 Oak Lake, Manitoba, Canada
- Died: November 9, 2019 (aged 65) Houston, Texas, U.S.
- Height: 6 ft 1 in (185 cm)
- Weight: 192 lb (87 kg; 13 st 10 lb)
- Position: Right Wing
- Shot: Right
- Played for: Houston Aeros; Indianapolis Racers
- NHL draft: 18th overall, 1974; Boston Bruins
- WHA draft: 3rd overall, 1974; Cincinnati Stingers
- Playing career: 1974–1980

John Donald "Don" Larway (February 12, 1954 – November 9, 2019) was a professional ice hockey player who played 324 games in the World Hockey Association (WHA).

== Playing career ==
Following two MJHL seasons with the Dauphin Kings, the Oak Lake, Manitoba native played two WCHL seasons, the first with the Winnipeg Jets and the second split between the Winnipeg Clubs and the Swift Current Broncos. Drafted 18th overall by the Boston Bruins, and third overall in the WHA by the Cincinnati Stingers, Larway spent his first four pro seasons with the Houston Aeros of the latter league. He joined the Indianapolis Racers in 1978–79, spending half the season in the minors with the Rochester Americans. Larway's final year in major pro hockey was split between the Kalamazoo Wings and the Adirondack Red Wings.

== Personal life ==
After retirement, he resided in Houston until his death, working as a professional videographer for the Houston Aeros of the American Hockey League, Houston Rockets and Houston Astros. He died on November 9, 2019, at the age of 65.

== Career statistics ==
=== Regular season and playoffs ===
			Regular season					Playoffs
Season	Team	League	GP	G	A	Pts	PIM	GP	G	A	Pts	PIM
1970–71	Dauphin Kings	MJHL	45	28	27	55	140	—	—	—	—	—
1971–72	Dauphin Kings	MJHL	40	26	29	55	123	—	—	—	—	—
1972–73	Winnipeg Jets	WCHL	67	35	31	66	147	—	—	—	—	—
1973–74	Winnipeg Clubs	WCHL	19	9	7	16	57	—	—	—	—	—
1973–74	Swift Current Broncos	WCHL	47	37	29	66	118	—	—	—	—	—
1974–75	Houston Aeros	WHA	76	21	14	35	59	13	3	1	4	8
1975–76	Houston Aeros	WHA	79	30	20	50	56	16	7	5	12	21
1976–77	Houston Aeros	WHA	75	11	13	24	112	3	1	0	1	0
1976–77	Oklahoma City Blazers	CHL	2	1	0	1	17	—	—	—	—	—
1977–78	Houston Aeros	WHA	69	24	35	59	52	6	1	2	3	4
1978–79	Rochester Americans	AHL	37	13	11	24	55	—	—	—	—	—
1978–79	Indianapolis Racers	WHA	25	8	10	18	39	—	—	—	—	—
1979–80	Adirondack Red Wings	AHL	48	12	15	27	15	5	1	1	2	0
1979–80	Kalamazoo Wings	IHL	12	3	3	6	16	—	—	—	—	—
WHA totals			324	94	92	186	318	38	12	8	20	3

Preceded by Andre Savard	Boston Bruins first-round draft pick 1974	Succeeded by Doug Halward
