= Manitoba Junior Hockey League =

Junior ice hockey league

- Current season or competition: 2026–27 MJHL season
- Countries: Canada
- Region: Manitoba
- Commissioner: Kevin Saurette
- Former names: Winnipeg and District League
- Founded: 1918
- No. of teams: 13
- Championship: Turnbull Cup
- Associated title: Centennial Cup
- Recent champions: Niverville Nighthawks
- Most successful club: Winnipeg Blues (17)
- Website: Official website

The Manitoba Junior Hockey League (MJHL) is a Junior 'A' ice hockey league operating in the Canadian province of Manitoba and one of nine member leagues of the Canadian Junior Hockey League (CJHL).

The MJHL consists of thirteen teams all based within the province of Manitoba, eight of which qualify for each year's playoffs. The playoff champion is awarded the Turnbull Cup, the Junior 'A' championship trophy for the province of Manitoba. The winner of the MJHL playoffs (Turnbull Cup) earns a berth in the national championship, the Centennial Cup.

== History ==
=== Early years (1918 to 1949) ===
The league's first year of operation was the 1918–19 season, making it the oldest junior league in Canada. It was known as the Winnipeg and District League until 1931, when it became the Manitoba Junior Hockey League. During the inaugural season, there were nine teams in two divisions, each playing a six-game schedule. The teams included the Winnipeg Pilgrims, Elmwood, Grand Trunk Pacific, Winnipeg Tigers, Young Men's Lutheran Club, Winnipeg Argonauts, Selkirk Fishermen, Weston, and Winnipeg Monarchs.

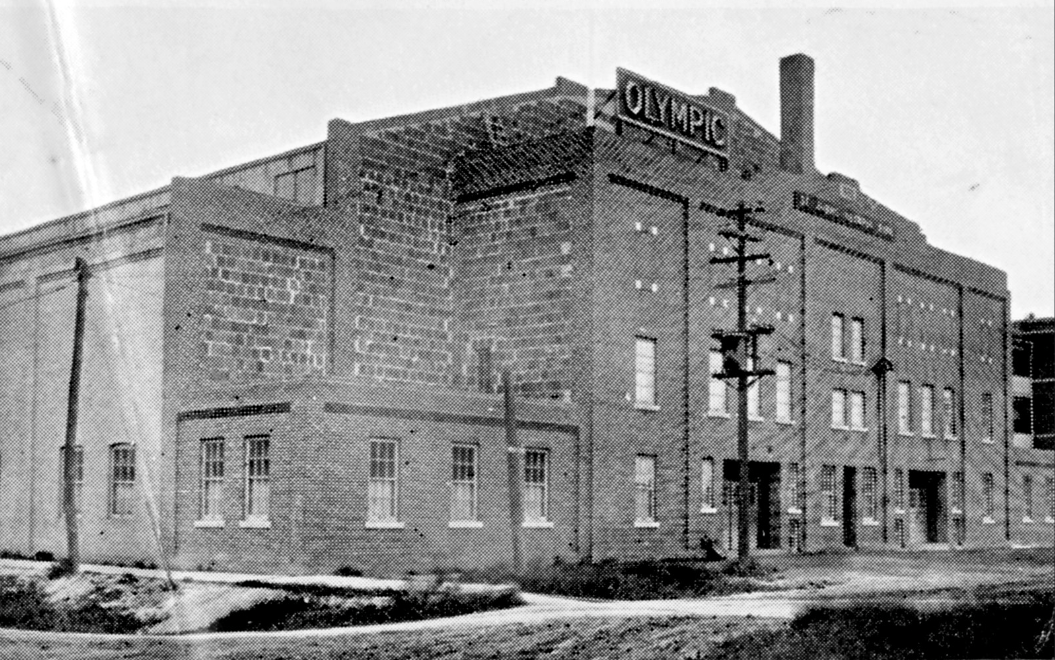
Olympic Rink

In the 1926–27 season, the Winnipeg Junior and Juvenile Hockey League became the north division of the MJHL, with Jimmy Dunn as its secretary, convenor and timekeeper at the Olympic Rink.

In the 1936–37 season, both the north and south MJHL divisions wanted to play games at the larger Winnipeg Amphitheatre since they could increase their share of the gate receipts. Multiple disputes arose over the scheduling of games, which led to Manitoba Amateur Hockey Association (MAHA) executives forming a special committee to arbitrate that all north division games be played at the Olympic Rink.

Teams in the north division struggled financially during World War II and sought a new financial arrangement for the 1940–41 season. The teams also disagreed on who played in which division, with some teams threatening to disband if their demands were not met. Jimmy Dunn recommended to split the gate receipts evenly between the teams and the rink owners, and for the MAHA to subsidize the teams as needed. The north division played the season reduced to four teams. The 1944–45 season was the first interlocking schedule between the north and south divisions, and the MAHA implemented of limits on the number of player transfers for balanced competition.

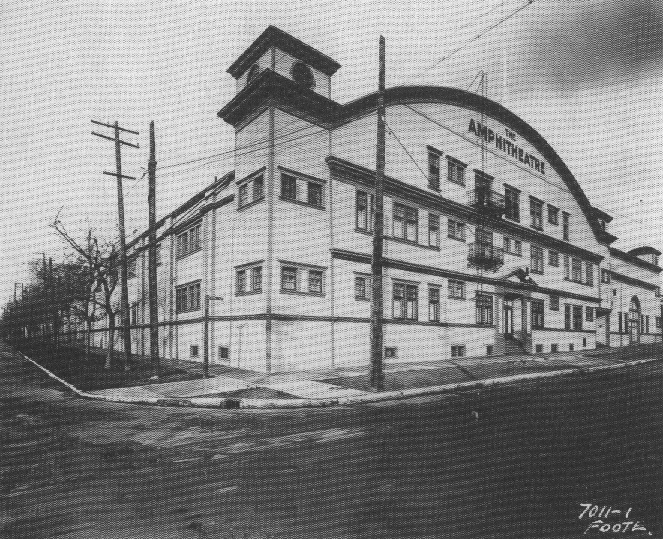
Winnipeg Amphitheatre

In the 1945–46 season, the north division teams threatened to withdraw from the MJHL unless several demands were met. They felt that the south division was given preferential treatment, and sought to equally share games at the larger Winnipeg Amphitheatre and the profits from gate receipts. The north division complained about the lack of available ice time for practices and the deplorable dressing room conditions at the Olympic Rink, and felt that the MAHA had an obligation to make the upgrades if the rink would not. After negotiations broke down, three junior teams withdrew and the MJHL operated with five teams in one division.

The stronger MJHL teams — the Winnipeg Rangers, Winnipeg Monarchs, Brandon Wheat Kings and Portage Terriers — were sponsored by National Hockey League (NHL) clubs and wanted to form an "A" division and play all games at the Winnipeg Amphitheatre for the 1946–47 season, and relegate all other teams to the "B" division at the Olympic Rink. The four teams were also opposed to any other teams being added to their division. The Winnipeg Tribune felt that these teams had pursued their own selfish interests with disregard for the general welfare of the league, and that creating the division would perpetuate the previous issues unless a "minor miracle" happened. The MAHA executive chose to include the St. James Orioles as a fifth team in the "A" division after being convinced that the team was soundly operated and would be able to compete.

=== 1950s and 1960s ===
In 1955, the brothers Art and Gordon Stratton of the Winnipeg Barons set a league record for most points in a single season with 76 each. In 1957, Ray Brunel of the St. Boniface Canadiens broke it with 105.

In the 1959–60 season, MAHA president Earl Dawson sought a better financial arrangement with the Saskatchewan Amateur Hockey Association (SAHA) to recuperate the costs of developing minor hockey players and on-ice officials in Flin Flon, after the Flin Flon Bombers affiliated with the Saskatchewan Junior Hockey League (SJHL) instead of the MJHL. When the Brandon Wheat Kings also wanted to play in the SJHL, the MAHA renegotiated the financial arrangement to prevent the loss of another team to an out-of-province league.

In the early 1960s, the powerhouse Brandon Wheat Kings, built by Jake Milford, won three titles in a row, and four in five years. In 1961, goalie Ernie Wakely of the Winnipeg Braves was named Canada's outstanding junior hockey player for the month of January.

The MJHL began the 1961–62 season using international ice hockey rules without body checking as an effort to attract more spectators, and hired a new promotional director. In November 1961, CAHA president Jack Roxburgh ordered the MJHL to revert to standard Canadian rules since it had not been approved by the national body.

In 1962, Clarence Campbell president of the NHL attended inaugural Manitoba–Saskatchewan all-star game in Winnipeg. In 1963, Jim Irving, captain of the Winnipeg Rangers, was named Manitoba's outstanding junior athlete and received the Carl Pederson Memorial Award.

Jimmy Dunn was hired as commissioner of the MJHL in May 1964. The league had been reduced to four teams based in the Greater Winnipeg area after the withdrawal of the Brandon Wheat Kings and the Fort Frances Royals. The MJHL transitioned from a draft of players in the Greater Winnipeg Minor Hockey Association, into a system where each team chose players from a set geographic district. The new "zoning" arrangement was planned to be in effect for three seasons to stimulate more localized interest in junior hockey and aimed to keep teammates together from the minor hockey level to the junior hockey level. Dunn supported the change and noted that the concept had produced forward lines on previous Memorial Cup championship teams from Winnipeg.

For the 1964–65 MJHL season, the Charlie Gardiner Memorial Trophy series was revived as a preseason tournament for the league's teams. Dunn reached an agreement to televise MJHL games on CJAY-TV, and the league experimented with playing games on Sunday evenings instead of afternoons to increase its attendance and avoid competing with televised football games. Dunn requested to the Canadian Amateur Hockey Association (CAHA) that the MJHL waive its bye into the Abbott Cup finals and its playoffs champion meet the Thunder Bay Junior A Hockey League champion in the first round. He felt that the loss of gate receipts from a bye was a financial hardship for the MJHL, and shorten the league's playoffs to accommodate the change approved by the CAHA. Goaltender Wayne Stephenson led the Winnipeg Braves to the MJHL Championship in 1965.

For the 1965–66 MJHL season, Dunn implemented an automatic one-game minimum suspension for any player who received a match penalty. He felt that professional hockey influenced fisticuffs in junior hockey and said that, "Any time there's a big fight in the National Hockey League, the kids drop their sticks and put up their dukes in the next game. It happens almost every time".

The MJHL expanded from four to six teams for the 1966–67 MJHL season when it readmitted the Brandon Wheat Kings and accepted the Selkirk Steelers. Dunn announced his resignation as commissioner on October 24, 1966, and cited personal reasons. Despite being offered a pay raise, he felt that the increase in teams made the job too much for him and had "taken the fun out of it". His resignation came shortly after a game between the Winnipeg Rangers and the Brandon Wheat Kings in which 242 penalty minutes were given in the first period.

In 1966–67, future Hall of Famer Bobby Clarke of the Flin Flon Bombers set league records for most goals (71), assists (112), and points (183) in a single season. Clarke led the Bombers to win the MJHL title.

On September 19, 1968, the Winnipeg Monarchs announced the signing of Hiroshi Hori, a defenceman from Japan. Hori, a high school all-star in his homeland, would spend a year with the team and then return home to pass on what he had learned. A Canadian missionary to Japan, Father Moran was behind the idea. With CAHA approval, Moran convinced the Japanese Skating Union to sponsor one player to a year in Canada. The CAHA chose Winnipeg as the site because of the added experience from watching the Canadian National Team, and the Monarchs volunteered.

=== The New MJHL ===
During the summer of 1967, the MAHA allowed three teams from Manitoba to enter the new Western Canadian Hockey League (WCHL): the Brandon Wheat Kings and Flin Flon Bombers from the MJHL, and Ben Hatskin's new Winnipeg Jets club. Hatskin already owned three MJHL teams, so as part of the agreement, divested his entire MJHL portfolio to local interests. The Winnipeg Warriors became the West Kildonan North Stars, the St. James Braves became the St. James Canadians, and the Winnipeg Rangers became the St. Boniface Saints. These three teams and the Winnipeg Monarchs became "the new MJHL". The Selkirk Steelers instead departed for the upstart Central Manitoba Junior Hockey League (CMJHL). The CMJHL was short-lived and its four teams were absorbed by the MJHL the following year. The Steelers, Portage Terriers, Dauphin Kings, and Kenora Muskies, who had operated out of Fort Garry the previous year, were placed in the MJHL's new North Division, while the existing MJHL teams made up the South Division.

On Sunday February 9, 1969, the MJHL held a special emergency meeting to discuss Butch Goring leaving the Winnipeg Jets of the WCHL and joining the Dauphin Kings. Goring played the night before in Kenora for the Kings during a regular season game. The MJHL gave the Kings approval to use Goring in regular season and playoff games. Goring was leading the WCHL in goals at the time. Monday, WCHL president Ron Butlin said a court injunction would be sought against Goring and another Jet forward Merv Haney from playing with the Dauphin Kings. Also saying the CHA would be "taking whatever action is necessary against Dauphin and the MAHA for damages." Goring and Haney would play for the Kings, all the way to the Western Memorial Cup Finals.

The reorganization of junior hockey in Canada in 1970 relegated the MJHL to Tier II status, now to be called Junior 'A'. MJHL champions would no longer play for the Memorial Cup; instead, a new national junior 'A' championship, the Manitoba Centennial Cup (now the Centennial Cup) was created. This new alignment would eventually lead to the formation of the Canadian Junior Hockey League in 1993.

=== 1970s, 1980s, and 1990s ===
The Dauphin Kings were the first "dynasty" of the new MJHL, winning the league three out of four years, 1969, 1970, and 1972, and boasting such stars as Ron Low, Butch Goring, and Ron Chipperfield. The Kings went to the Western Memorial Cup final in 1969, and in 1972 recorded 40 wins, a modern-day MJHL record. Charlie Simmer of the Kenora Muskies won the scoring title in 1973, the same year the Portage Terriers were crowned National Champs, winning the Centennial Cup. In 1974, the Selkirk Steelers won the national crown, giving the MJHL back to back "Canadian Championships". It was players such as Low, Goring, Chipperfield, Simmer, Chuck Arnason, Murray Bannerman, Paul Baxter, John Bednarski, Rick Blight, Dan Bonar, Brian Engblom, Glen Hanlon, Bob Joyce, Barry Legge, Perry Miller, Chris Oddleifson, Curt Ridley, Rick St. Croix, Blaine Stoughton, and Andy Van Hellemond who gave the new MJHL its foundation.

The Selkirk Steelers dominated, between 1974 and 1987, winning eight MJHL championships, including three in a row. The 1974 Steelers were inducted into the Manitoba Hockey Hall of Fame, as were the 1973 Portage Terriers. In 1975, Jim Misener of the Dauphin Kings led the league in goals with 73, breaking Bobby Clarke's single season record of 71. In 1977, the Dauphin Kings won their fourth MJHL title in a decade, led by Misener who became the MJHL career leader in goals, assists, and points.

In September 1971, Winnipeg Monarchs President Bob Westmacott announced 17-year-old Stephan Lindberg of Sweden had been invited to training camp. Jack Bownass, former coach of Canada's national team, recommended Lindberg to the Monarchs.

On April 5, 1977, MJHL commissioner Bill Addison called off the Turnbull Cup Finals between the Dauphin Kings and Kildonan North Stars, saying "No, I am not going to allow these characters an opportunity to beat on each other any longer. I am calling the series (a best-of-seven) and awarding it to Dauphin on the basis they won two of the three games completed." The decision came just hours after the two clubs had engaged in a pre-game brawl, in which two Kings players were taken to hospital and two North Stars were criminally charged. Chris Walby was convicted of common assault, and granted a conditional discharge. The Canadian Amateur Hockey Association was not as kind, suspending Walby for life.

Grant Ledyard led the Winnipeg South Blues to the first of four MJHL Championships in 8 years in 1982. In 1983, Mike Ridley of the St. Boniface Saints broke both Jim Misener's goal scoring record and Bobby Clarke's points record. In 95, Cory Cyrenne of the Saints was chosen Canadian Junior A Hockey League (CJAHL) Player of the Year, and the Winnipeg South Blues won their fifth championship, on their road to a second Anavet Cup, and an Abbott Cup. The 1995 Blues were inducted into Manitoba Hockey Hall of Fame. In 1998, Jedd Crumb of the Blues led the CJAHL in goals with 61.

In 1979, the rival NorMan Junior Hockey League was granted Junior 'A' status, putting it into Turnbull Cup competition alongside the MJHL. This arrangement lasted until the demise of the NJHL in 1985, although during this era, no NJHL was ever successful in the provincial playoffs.

The 1980s and 1990s saw the MJHL expand its footprint outside of Winnipeg with the addition of teams in Winkler, Neepawa, Swan River, and three First Nations communities: Sagkeeng, Opaskwayak (The Pas) and Waywayseecappo. Teams were also added in Steinbach and Thunder Bay, Ontario, however neither played more than three seasons before folding. At the same time, the league's presence in Winnipeg began a period decline with the demise of the Kildonan North Stars in 1990. This was the first of several Winnipeg-based teams to fold or relocate from the city; by 2012, only one team remained in the provincial capital.

=== 2000 to present ===
As the twenty first century dawned, the OCN Blizzard were dominating the MJHL, winning five straight MJHL championships from 1999 to 2003. This was a record previously achieved by only the legendary Elmwood Millionaires (1927–1931). Junior Lessard of the Portage Terriers was named CJAHL Player of the Year in 2000. Blizzard goaltenders Preston McKay (1998) and Marc Andre Leclerc (2001) led the CJAHL in goals against average, and left winger Andrew Coates (2003) led in goals. In 2004, Aaron Starr of the Blizzard became the first MJHL player to lead the CJAHL in scoring with 118 points.

As the Blizzard's dynasty came to an end, the Portage Terriers began their own golden age with a trip to the MJHL finals in 2003–04. The Terriers lost the series, but laid claim to the Turnbull Cup and ANAVET Cup titles the following season. This would start a run of nine championships over fifteen seasons, plus three ANAVET Cup wins and the 2015 national championship. The 2014-15 Terriers set a new league record for single-season winning percentage (.917) when they dominated the MJHL with a 53-3-4 record during the regular season and went undefeated in the playoffs to capture their ninth Turnbull Cup. The Terriers capped off their dream season by winning the 2015 Royal Bank Cup on home ice in Portage la Prairie. The Terriers dominated again the following season, putting up an impressive 31-game winning streak on their way to a second consecutive Turnbull Cup. The Steinbach Pistons have also been a dominant club since relocating to Steinbach in 2009, posting the top regular season record four times, three Turnbull Cup victories, and an ANAVET Cup championship in 2018.

The demise of the St. James Canadians in 2003 and the relocation of the Winnipeg Saints to Virden in 2012 left the Blues and Steelers as the only remaining clubs in the Winnipeg Metropolitan Region. The league reversed this trend in the 2020s by granting a second franchise (Winnipeg Freeze, now the Monarchs) to 50 Below Sports + Entertainment (which already owned the Blues). The Town of Niverville was also granted a franchise, the Niverville Nighthawks, to begin play in 2022. In only their fourth season, the Nighthawks posted their own memorable season, losing only eighth games all season on their way to their first Turnbull Cup, followed by the 2026 Centennial Cup championship in Summerside, Prince Edward Island.

==== Neepawa Natives hazing incident ====
In October 2011, the Neepawa Natives were involved a hazing incident that garnered significant negative publicity, both locally and nationally. After the league conducted its investigation, commissioner Kim Davis confirmed that a 15-year-old player had come forward with allegations of sexual-based rookie hazing in the team's locker room. A record $5,000 fine and 18 suspensions resulted from the incident and the matter was referred to the Royal Canadian Mounted Police, although no criminal charges resulted. The team gained even more negative press by benching and refusing to release or trade the 15-year-old who brought the issue to light.

==== COVID-19 pandemic ====
The onset of the COVID-19 pandemic during the first round of the MJHL playoffs in March 2020 forced the cancellation of the remainder of the 2019-20 season, marking the first time in its history that the Turnbull Cup was not awarded. The pandemic also forced the cancellation of the 2020 ANAVET and Centennial Cups, the latter of which was to be played in Portage la Prairie in honour of the national championship's 50th season. The league attempted a shortened schedule for the 2020-21 season but was thwarted when tightened health restrictions were enacted by the provincial government that November, requiring the cancellation of all remaining games for a second consecutive season. The MJHL returned to its regular format for the start of the 2021-22 season with a strict COVID-19 vaccination policy, in accordance with provincial health directives, requiring all players, coaches, officials to be immunized and all volunteers and spectators to provide proof of immunization before entering any league venue. This policy lasted until the provincial government dropped most of its public health measures in March 2022.

== Teams ==
=== Current ===
Map of MJHL teams
West Division East Division

The MJHL consists of thirteen teams separated geographically into two divisions. The league has gone to a single division format on occasion, most notably from 1945 to 1968 and more recently from 2014 to 2020. A three-division format was implemented for the partially completed 2020–21 season that was cancelled due to the COVID-19 pandemic.

East Division
Team	City	Arena	Joined
Niverville Nighthawks	Niverville	Niverville Community Resource & Recreation Centre	2022
Portage Terriers	Portage la Prairie	Stride Place	1942
Selkirk Steelers	Selkirk	Selkirk Recreation Complex	1966
Steinbach Pistons	Steinbach	Southeast Event Centre	1988
Winkler Flyers	Winkler	Winkler Arena	1980
Winnipeg Blues	Winnipeg	The Rink Training Centre	1930
Winnipeg Monarchs	Winnipeg	Hockey for All Centre	2020
West Division
Team	City	Arena	Joined
Dauphin Kings	Dauphin	Credit Union Place	1967
Neepawa Titans	Neepawa	Yellowhead Centre	1989
Northern Manitoba Blizzard	The Pas	Roy H Johnston Arena	1996
Swan Valley Stampeders	Swan River	Swan River Centennial Arena	1999
Virden Oil Capitals	Virden	Tundra Oil & Gas Place	1956
Waywayseecappo Wolverines	Waywayseecappo	Waywayseecappo Wolverines Complex	1999

=== Former/defunct ===
- Beausejour Blades
- Brandon Elks
- Brandon Travellers
- CUAC Blues
- East Kildonan Bisons
- Elmwood Maple Leafs
- Elmwood Millionaires
- Kenora Muskies
- Kildonan North Stars
- Southeast Blades/Thunderbirds
- St. Boniface Athletics
- St. Boniface Canadiens
- St. Boniface Seals
- Steinbach Hawks
- Stonewall Jets
- St. James Canadians (1936–45)
- St. James Canadians (1967–2003)
- St. James Orioles
- Thompson King Miners
- Thunder Bay Hornets
- Winnipeg Air Cadets
- Winnipeg Esquires
- Winnipeg Monarchs
- Winnipeg Rangers/Black Hawks/Barons
- Winnipeg Rangers (1956–67)
- Winnipeg Hockey Club
- Winnipeg Junior Falcons
- Winnipeg/St. Boniface Saints
- Winnipeg Wellingtons
- Wolseley Flyers

== Turnbull Cup Champions ==
The Turnbull Memorial Trophy (2018)

The Turnbull Cup (2006)

The Turnbull Memorial Trophy, or Turnbull Cup, is awarded by Hockey Manitoba to the provincial Junior 'A' hockey champion each season. As the MJHL is the only Junior 'A' league based in Manitoba, its playoffs also serve as the provincial championship. In past years, rival Junior 'A' leagues, namely the Central Manitoba Junior Hockey League (1968) and NorMan Junior Hockey League (1980–85), were sometimes included in Turnbull Cup competition, in which case a playoff series between the respective league champions was held to determine the provincial title.

The trophy was donated by the Winnipeg Hockey Club in 1920 to honour Walter James "Ollie" Turnbull, a captain in the 10th Brigade Canadian Field Artillery, who was killed in the First World War. The trophy underwent a major refurbishment in 2018.

Year	Champion	Runner-up
Winnipeg & District League Championship (Note: The league's two first two seasons predated the Turnbull Cup.)
1918	Selkirk Fishermen	Fort Rouge Wanderers
1919	Winnipeg YMLC	Winnipeg Pilgrims
Turnbull Cup (Memorial Cup Era)
1920	Selkirk Fishermen	Winnipeg YMLC
1921	Winnipeg Falcons	Portage la Prairie
1922	University of Manitoba	Brandon
1923	University of Manitoba	Brandon
1924	Winnipeg Tammany Tigers	Dauphin
1925	University of Manitoba	Portage la Prairie Vics
1926	Winnipeg Tammany Tigers	Portage la Prairie Vics
1927	Elmwood Millionaires	Dauphin
1928	Elmwood Millionaires	Neepawa
1929	Elmwood Millionaires	Birtle-Minnedosa
1930	Elmwood Millionaires	Brandon
1931	Elmwood Millionaires	Winnipeg Monarchs
1932	Winnipeg Monarchs	Brandon
1933	Brandon Native Sons	Winnipeg Winnipegs
1934	Kenora Thistles (Note: The Kenora Thistles are the only MJHL club from outside of Manitoba to win the Turnbull Cup.)	Brandon Native Sons
1935	Winnipeg Monarchs	The Pas Huskies
1936	Elmwood Maple Leafs	Emerson Aces
1937	Winnipeg Monarchs	St. Boniface Seals
1938	St. Boniface Seals	Winnipeg Monarchs
1939	Brandon Elks	Winnipeg Monarchs
1940	Kenora Thistles	Elmwood Maple Leafs
1941	Winnipeg Rangers	East Kildonan Bisons
1942	Portage Terriers	St. Boniface Athletics
1943	Winnipeg Rangers	St. Boniface Athletics
1944	St. James Canadians	St. Boniface Athletics
1945	Winnipeg Monarchs	Winnipeg Esquires-Red Wings
1946	Winnipeg Monarchs	Brandon Elks
1947	Brandon Elks	Winnipeg Monarchs
1948	Winnipeg Monarchs	Winnipeg Canadiens
1949	Brandon Wheat Kings	Winnipeg Canadiens
1950	Brandon Wheat Kings
1951	Winnipeg Monarchs	Brandon Wheat Kings
1952	Winnipeg Monarchs	Brandon Wheat Kings
1953	St. Boniface Canadiens	Brandon Wheat Kings
1954	St. Boniface Canadiens	Brandon Wheat Kings
1955	Winnipeg Monarchs	Winnipeg Barons
1956	St. Boniface Canadiens	Winnipeg Monarchs
1957	Winnipeg Monarchs	St. Boniface Canadiens
1958	St. Boniface Canadiens	Winnipeg Monarchs
1959	Winnipeg Braves	St. Boniface Canadiens
1960	Brandon Wheat Kings	Winnipeg Rangers
1961	Winnipeg Rangers	Brandon Wheat Kings
1962	Brandon Wheat Kings	Winnipeg Monarchs
1963	Brandon Wheat Kings	St. Boniface Canadiens
1964	Brandon Wheat Kings	Fort Frances Royals
1965	Winnipeg Braves	Winnipeg Monarchs
1966	Winnipeg Rangers	Winnipeg Braves
1967	Flin Flon Bombers	Brandon Wheat Kings
1968	St. James Canadians	Selkirk Steelers (CMJHL) (Note: For the 1967-68 season, the MJHL champion played the Central Manitoba Junior Hockey League champion for the Turnbull Cup.)
1969	Dauphin Kings	St. Boniface Saints
1970	Dauphin Kings	St. James Canadians
Turnbull Cup (Centennial Cup Era)
1971	St. Boniface Saints	Kenora Muskies
1972	Dauphin Kings	West Kildonan North Stars
1973	Portage Terriers	St. James Canadians
1974	Selkirk Steelers	West Kildonan North Stars
1975	Selkirk Steelers	West Kildonan North Stars
1976	Selkirk Steelers	West Kildonan North Stars
1977	Dauphin Kings	Kildonan North Stars
1978	Kildonan North Stars	Dauphin Kings
1979	Selkirk Steelers	Kildonan North Stars
1980	Selkirk Steelers	Thompson King Miners (NJHL) (Note: From 1980 to 1985, the MJHL champion played the NorMan Junior Hockey League champion for the Turnbull Cup.)
1981	St. Boniface Saints	Thompson King Miners (NJHL)
1982	Winnipeg South Blues	Flin Flon Bombers (NJHL)
1983	Dauphin Kings	The Pas Huskies (NJHL)
1984	Selkirk Steelers	Flin Flon Bombers (NJHL)
1985	Selkirk Steelers	Thompson King Miners (NJHL)
1986	Winnipeg South Blues	Selkirk Steelers
1987	Selkirk Steelers	Winnipeg South Blues
1988	Winnipeg South Blues	Portage Terriers
1989	Winnipeg South Blues	Selkirk Steelers
1990	Portage Terriers	Kildonan North Stars
1991	Winkler Flyers	Winnipeg South Blues
1992	Winkler Flyers	St. James Canadians
1993	Dauphin Kings	St. Boniface Saints
1994	St. Boniface Saints	Winkler Flyers
1995	Winnipeg South Blues	Winkler Flyers
1996	St. James Canadians	Neepawa Natives
1997	St. James Canadians	OCN Blizzard
1998	Winkler Flyers	St. James Canadians
1999	OCN Blizzard	Winnipeg South Blues
2000	OCN Blizzard	Winnipeg South Blues
2001	OCN Blizzard	Winkler Flyers
2002	OCN Blizzard	Winkler Flyers
2003	OCN Blizzard	Southeast Blades
2004	Selkirk Steelers	Portage Terriers
2005	Portage Terriers	Selkirk Steelers
2006	Winnipeg South Blues	OCN Blizzard
2007	Selkirk Steelers	Dauphin Kings
2008	Portage Terriers	Winnipeg Saints
2009	Portage Terriers	Selkirk Steelers
2010	Dauphin Kings	Winnipeg Saints
2011	Portage Terriers	Selkirk Steelers
2012	Portage Terriers	Winnipeg Saints
2013	Steinbach Pistons	Dauphin Kings
2014	Winnipeg Blues	Dauphin Kings
2015	Portage Terriers	Steinbach Pistons
2016	Portage Terriers	Steinbach Pistons
2017	Portage Terriers	OCN Blizzard
2018	Steinbach Pistons	Virden Oil Capitals
2019	Portage Terriers	Swan Valley Stampeders
2020	No champion (Note: The 2019-20 playoffs were cancelled midway through the first round in response to the COVID-19 pandemic)
2021	No champion (Note: The 2020-21 season was halted November 12, 2020 and officially cancelled February 12, 2021 because of the COVID-19 pandemic.)
2022	Dauphin Kings	Steinbach Pistons
2023	Steinbach Pistons	Virden Oil Capitals
2024	Winkler Flyers	Steinbach Pistons
2025	Northern Manitoba Blizzard	Dauphin Kings
2026	Niverville Nighthawks	Virden Oil Capitals

== Post MJHL Playoffs ==
=== Formats ===
Each season's Turnbull Cup champion advances to Centennial Cup, the Canadian National Junior 'A' championship. From 1970 to 2021, the Turnbull Cup champion first played the Saskatchewan champion, the winner of the Saskatchewan Junior Hockey League (SJHL) playoffs, for the ANAVET Cup. The winner of that series earns a berth in the Centennial Cup (known as the Royal Bank Cup from 1996 to 2018). Between 2013 and 2017, the ANAVET and Doyle Cups were replaced by the Western Canada Cup (WCC), a regional tournament that determined the two Western Canadian seeds at the national championship.

Prior to 1991, the ANAVET Cup champions advanced to the Abbott Cup against the winner of Doyle Cup with the winner going on to face the Eastern Canada champions for the national Junior 'A' title. Beginning in 1991, the national championship format was expanded to include both the ANAVET and Doyle Cup champions, after which the Abbott Cup series no longer was played and the champion was crowned from the results of the round robin part of the national championship. The Abbott Cup was formally retired in 1999.

Since the tournament format for the Centennial Cup began in 1985, MJHL clubs have hosted national championships on three occasions: 1992 in Winnipeg, 2010 in Dauphin, and 2015 in Portage la Prairie. Portage la Prairie was also selected to host the 2020 championship which was cancelled at the onset of the COVID-19 pandemic.

Prior to the reorganization of Canadian junior hockey in 1970, the MJHL champion played for the Memorial Cup, the former Canadian Tier I Junior championship. These post-MJHL playoffs were commonly known as the Memorial Cup playoffs. For the MJHL clubs, the road was firstly the western semi-finals and finals for the Abbott Cup, and then the Memorial Cup Finals. During this 53-year era (1918–1970), MJHL clubs won 18 Abbott Cups, and 11 Memorial Cups.

=== Manitoba/Saskatchewan Junior 'A' Hockey Championships ===
ANAVET Cup (1971–2012, 2017–2021)

- 1971 St. Boniface Saints
- 1973 Portage Terriers
- 1974 Selkirk Steelers
- 1975 Selkirk Steelers
- 1983 Dauphin Kings
- 1986 Winnipeg South Blues
- 1992 Winkler Flyers
- 1995 Winnipeg South Blues
- 2002 OCN Blizzard
- 2005 Portage Terriers
- 2007 Selkirk Steelers
- 2010 Dauphin Kings
- 2011 Portage Terriers
- 2018 Steinbach Pistons
- 2019 Portage Terriers

=== Western Canadian Junior Hockey Championships ===
Abbott Cup (1919–1970) Western Canadian Junior Championships

- 1920 Selkirk Fishermen
- 1921 Winnipeg Junior Falcons
- 1923 University of Manitoba
- 1929 Elmwood Millionaires
- 1931 Elmwood Millionaires
- 1932 Winnipeg Monarchs
- 1935 Winnipeg Monarchs
- 1937 Winnipeg Monarchs
- 1938 St. Boniface Seals
- 1940 Kenora Thistles
- 1941 Winnipeg Rangers
- 1942 Portage Terriers
- 1943 Winnipeg Rangers
- 1946 Winnipeg Monarchs
- 1949 Brandon Wheat Kings
- 1951 Winnipeg Monarchs
- 1953 St. Boniface Canadiens
- 1959 Winnipeg Braves

Abbott Cup (1971–1999) Western Canadian Junior 'A' Championships

- 1973 Portage Terriers
- 1974 Selkirk Steelers
- 1995 Winnipeg South Blues

=== National Junior Hockey Championships ===
Memorial Cup (1919–1970) National Junior Championships

- 1921 Winnipeg Junior Falcons
- 1923 University of Manitoba
- 1931 Elmwood Millionaires
- 1935 Winnipeg Monarchs
- 1937 Winnipeg Monarchs
- 1938 St. Boniface Seals
- 1941 Winnipeg Rangers
- 1942 Portage Terriers
- 1943 Winnipeg Rangers
- 1946 Winnipeg Monarchs
- 1959 Winnipeg Braves

Centennial Cup (1971–1995, 2019–present) / Royal Bank Cup (1996–2018) National Junior 'A' Championships

- 1973 Portage Terriers
- 1974 Selkirk Steelers
- 2015 Portage Terriers
- 2026 Niverville Nighthawks

== Notable players ==
Over the years, more than 200 MJHL players have gone on to the National Hockey League (NHL), and 11 of those MJHL graduates have been inducted into the Hockey Hall of Fame including; Andy Bathgate, Turk Broda, Art Coulter, Bobby Clarke, Charlie Gardiner, Bryan Hextall, Tom Johnson, Harry Oliver, Babe Pratt, Terry Sawchuk, and Jack Stewart.

== Awards and leaders ==
=== Individual awards ===
- Steve "Boomer" Hawrysh Award MVP
- Ed Belfour Top Goaltender Trophy Top Goaltender
- Brian Kozak Award Top Defenceman
- Kim Davis Trophy Rookie of the Year
- Frank McKinnon Memorial Trophy Hockey Ability and Sportsmanship
- Muzz McPherson Award Coach of the Year
- Mike Ridley Trophy Scoring Champion
- MJHL Top Goal Scorers
- MJHL All-Star Teams
- MJHL All Rookie Team
- MJHL Playoff MVP
- CJHL Player of the Year (MJHL)

=== Scholarships ===
- RBC Financial Group MJHL Scholarship
- Ed Belfour High Performance Award
- Frank McKinnon Scholarship

== Commissioners ==
- Jimmy Dunn, 1964–1966
- Bill Addison, 1972–1988
- Gary Cribbs, 1988–1992
- Frank McKinnon, 1992–2002
- Kim Davis, 2002–2020
- Kevin Saurette, 2020–present

== Timeline of teams ==
- 1917 – The league is founded as the Winnipeg & District League
- 1924 – Elmwood Millionaires join league
- 1930 – Winnipeg Monarchs and Kenora Thistles join league
- 1931 – Winnipeg & District League is renamed the Manitoba Junior Hockey League
- 1931 – Elmwood Millionaires fold
- 1933 – Elmwood Maple Leafs join league
- 1934 – St. Boniface Seals join league
- 1935 – Woodhaven Maple Leafs join league
- 1935 – Selkirk Fisherman fold
- 1936 – Woodhaven Maple Leafs become the St. James Canadians
- 1938 – Brandon Wheat Kings become the Brandon Elks
- 1939 – Winnipeg Rangers and CUAC Blues join league
- 1939 – St. Boniface Seals become St. Boniface Athletics
- 1940 – Brandon Elks become the Brandon Wheat Kings
- 1940 – Kenora Thistles and Elmwood Maple Leafs fold
- 1942 – Portage Terriers and Wolseley Flyers join league
- 1943 – Wolseley Flyers fold
- 1945 – St. James Canadians become St. James Orioles
- 1945 – St. Boniface Athletics and CUAC Blues fold
- 1946 – St. James Orioles relocate to Winnipeg and become the Winnipeg Canadiens
- 1947 – Portage Terriers fold
- 1947 – Winnipeg Rangers become the Winnipeg Black Hawks
- 1952 – Winnipeg Black Hawks become the Winnipeg Barons
- 1952 – Winnipeg Canadians relocate to St. Boniface and become the St. Boniface Canadiens
- 1956 – Winnipeg Braves and new Winnipeg Rangers join league
- 1957 – Winnipeg Barons fold
- 1957 – Winnipeg Rangers relocate to Brandon and become the Brandon Rangers
- 1958 – Brandon Rangers relocate to Transcona and become the Transcona Rangers
- 1959 – Transcona Rangers return to Winnipeg and become the Winnipeg Rangers
- 1963 – Fort Frances Royals join league for one season
- 1964 – Brandon Wheat Kings leave to join SJHL
- 1964 – St. Boniface Canadiens relocate to Winnipeg and become the Winnipeg Warriors
- 1966 – Brandon Wheat Kings rejoin league
- 1966 – Winnipeg Braves become the St. James Braves
- 1966 – Selkirk Steelers join league
- 1967 – Brandon Wheat Kings leave to join WCHL
- 1967 – Selkirk Steelers leave to join CMJHL
- 1967 – St. James Braves become the new St. James Canadians
- 1967 – Winnipeg Rangers relocate to St. Boniface and become the St. Boniface Saints
- 1967 – Winnipeg Warriors relocate to Kildonan and become the West Kildonan North Stars
- 1968 – MJHL/CMJHL merger: Dauphin Kings and Kenora Muskies join league, Portage Terriers and Selkirk Steelers rejoin league
- 1973 – Brandon Travellers join league
- 1975 – Kenora Muskies become the Kenora Thistles
- 1975 – Thompson King Miners join league
- 1976 – West Kildonan North Stars become Kildonan North Stars
- 1976 – Winnipeg Monarchs become the Assiniboine Park Monarchs
- 1977 – Assiniboine Park Monarchs become the Fort Garry Blues
- 1978 – Thompson King Miners leave to join NJHL
- 1980 – Brandon Travellers fold
- 1980 – Winkler Flyers join league
- 1982 – Kenora Thistles fold
- 1984 – Fort Garry Blues become the Winnipeg South Blues
- 1984 – Thunder Bay Hornets join league
- 1985 – Steinbach Hawks join league
- 1986 – Thunder Bay Hornets fold
- 1988 – Southeast Thunderbirds join league
- 1988 – Steinbach Hawks fold
- 1989 – Neepawa Natives join league
- 1990 – Kildonan North Stars fold
- 1992 – Southeast Thunderbirds relocate to Sakgeeng and became the Southeast Blades
- 1996 – OCN Blizzard join league
- 1999 – Waywayseecappo Wolverines and Swan Valley Stampeders join league
- 2000 – St. Boniface Saints become the Winnipeg Saints
- 2003 – St. James Canadians take a one-year leave of absence and fold one year later
- 2007 – Southeast Blades relocate to Beausejour and become the Beausejour Blades
- 2009 – Beausejour Blades relocate to Steinbach and become the Steinbach Pistons
- 2010 – Winnipeg Saints relocate to St. Adolphe
- 2010 – Winnipeg South Blues become the Winnipeg Blues
- 2011 – Winnipeg Saints relocate back to Winnipeg
- 2012 – Winnipeg Saints relocate to Virden and become the Virden Oil Capitals
- 2020 – Winnipeg Freeze join league
- 2021 - Neepawa Natives become the Neepawa Titans
- 2022 - Niverville Nighthawks join league
- 2024 - OCN Blizzard relocate to The Pas and become the Northern Manitoba Blizzard
- 2025 - Winnipeg Freeze renamed the Winnipeg Monarchs

== See also ==
- Hockey Manitoba
- Manitoba Hockey Hall of Fame
