= John Bednarski =

Canadian ice hockey player (born 1952)

- Born: July 4, 1952 (age 74) Thunder Bay, Ontario, Canada
- Height: 5 ft 10 in (178 cm)
- Weight: 185 lb (84 kg; 13 st 3 lb)
- Position: Defence
- Shot: Left
- Played for: New York Rangers; Edmonton Oilers
- NHL draft: Undrafted
- Playing career: 1972–1982

John Severn Bednarski (born July 4, 1952) is a Canadian former ice hockey defenceman, who played in the National Hockey League (NHL) for the New York Rangers and the Edmonton Oilers between 1974 and 1979.

Bednarski was born in Thunder Bay, Ontario. An alumnus of the Manitoba Junior Hockey League, he signed with the Rangers as a free agent in 1972 and began play in the American Hockey League (AHL) with the Rochester Americans. He made his NHL debut in 1974 with the Rangers, playing a total of 99 games over three seasons, and scored two goals and 18 assists. In 1977, he returned to the minor leagues before signing with the Oilers for their first year in the NHL, playing only one game before being sent back down to the minors.

He later signed a contract with the Buffalo Sabres but never played another NHL game. He eventually became the radio and TV analyst for the Americans for many years before resigning before the 2005–06 season. In 2007, Bednarski was inducted into the Americans Hall of Fame.

== Career statistics ==
=== Regular season and playoffs ===
			Regular season					Playoffs
Season	Team	League	GP	G	A	Pts	PIM	GP	G	A	Pts	PIM
1970–71	West Kildonan North Stars	MJHL	46	10	27	37	229	—	—	—	—	—
1970–71	Winnipeg Jets	WCHL	3	0	0	0	2	12	1	1	2	15
1971–72	Winnipeg Jets	WCHL	65	4	17	21	212	—	—	—	—	—
1972–73	Rochester Americans	AHL	72	14	24	38	205	6	1	8	9	16
1973–74	Providence Reds	AHL	76	15	46	61	222	15	3	11	14	35
1974–75	New York Rangers	NHL	35	1	10	11	37	1	0	0	0	17
1974–75	Providence Reds	AHL	25	6	5	11	37	1	0	0	0	6
1975–76	New York Rangers	NHL	59	1	8	9	77	—	—	—	—	—
1976–77	New York Rangers	NHL	5	0	0	0	0	—	—	—	—	—
1976–77	New Haven Nighthawks	AHL	74	10	48	58	110	6	2	6	8	4
1977–78	New Haven Nighthawks	AHL	64	12	40	52	98	15	0	6	6	21
1978–79	New Haven Nighthawks	AHL	77	13	41	54	146	10	2	5	7	28
1979–80	Edmonton Oilers	NHL	1	0	0	0	0	—	—	—	—	—
1979–80	Cincinnati Stingers	CHL	28	6	18	24	53	—	—	—	—	—
1979–80	Adirondack Red Wings	AHL	46	11	33	44	54	5	0	4	4	16
1980–81	Rochester Americans	AHL	76	3	18	21	156	—	—	—	—	—
1981–82	Erie Blades	AHL	66	10	30	40	59	—	—	—	—	—
AHL totals			576	94	285	379	1116	58	8	40	48	126
NHL totals			100	2	18	20	114	1	0	0	0	17
