= Wayne Chernecki =

Canadian ice hockey player (1949–2013)

- Born: August 12, 1949 Winnipeg, Manitoba, Canada
- Died: February 11, 2013 (aged 63) Winnipeg, Manitoba, Canada
- Height: 6 ft 1 in (185 cm)
- Weight: 190 lb (86 kg; 13 st 8 lb)
- Position: Centre
- Shot: Left
- Played for: Springfield Kings; Providence Reds
- NHL draft: 45th overall, 1969; Detroit Red Wings
- Playing career: 1971–1975

Wayne Chernecki (August 12, 1949—February 11, 2013) was a Canadian professional ice hockey player whose career spanned from 1971 to 1975.

== Career ==
Chernecki played junior hockey with the Winnipeg Jets of the Western Canada Hockey League (WCHL). In his final season with the Jets, Chernecki had a breakout performance, finishing among the league's most prolific scorers. He amassed an impressive 123 points, comprising goals and assists, throughout just 65 games.

Chernecki was chosen by the Detroit Red Wings in the fourth round (45th overall) of the 1969 NHL Amateur Draft, but opted to stay with the Jets while completing a business degree. After earning his degree in 1971, he began his professional hockey career, appearing in 263 regular-season games in the American Hockey League with the Springfield Kings and Providence Reds. His playing days were cut short in 1975 due to a significant knee injury.

== Post career ==
Following his playing career, Chernecki turned to coaching in the Manitoba Junior Hockey League, where he guided the St. James Canadians to back-to-back league championships. Simultaneously, he established himself in the business world, rising to an executive role within David Thomson's corporate network and serving on the board of directors for True North Sports & Entertainment.

== Personal ==
Chernecki died on February 11, 2013, at the age of 63 after a battle with esophageal cancer. In recognition of his contributions to the sport in Manitoba, both on the ice and behind the bench, Chernecki was posthumously inducted into the Manitoba Hockey Hall of Fame.

== Career statistics ==
			Regular season					Playoffs
Season	Team	League	GP	G	A	Pts	PIM	GP	G	A	Pts	PIM
1967–68	Winnipeg Jets	WCHL	3	2	2	4	2	—	—	—	—	—
1968–69	Winnipeg Jets	WCHL	53	35	30	65	25	—	—	—	—	—
1969–70	Winnipeg Jets	WCHL	30	14	10	24	12	—	—	—	—	—
1970–71	Winnipeg Jets	WCHL	65	50	73	123	56	—	—	—	—	—
1971–72	Springfield Kings	AHL	67	24	36	60	19	5	1	1	2	5
1972–73	Springfield Kings	AHL	57	22	24	46	19	—	—	—	—	—
1973–74	Springfield Kings	AHL	60	21	39	60	30	—	—	—	—	—
1973–74	Providence Reds	AHL	11	3	2	5	0	13	1	3	4	6
1974–75	Providence Reds	AHL	68	8	16	24	26	2	0	0	0	9
1977–78	Elmwood Millionaires	CSHL	—	1	0	1	—	—	—	—	—	—
AHL totals			263	78	117	195	94	20	2	4	6	20
