= Winnipeg Jets (disambiguation) =

The Winnipeg Jets, formerly Atlanta Thrashers, are a professional team in the National Hockey League.

Winnipeg Jets may also refer to:

- Winnipeg Jets (1972–96), a professional team in the World Hockey Association and National Hockey League
- Winnipeg Jets (WHL), a junior team in the Western Hockey League which used the name from 1967 to 1973
