= 2019–20 MJHL season =

- League: Manitoba Junior Hockey League
- Sport: Ice hockey
- Games: 330
- Teams: 11

Regular Season
- First Place: Steinbach Pistons
- Season MVP: Grady Hobbs
- Top scorer: Mikol Sartor

Turnbull Cup
- Champions: No champion
- Playoff MVP: Not awarded

List of MJHL seasons
- ← 2018–19 2020–21 →

The 2019–20 season was the Manitoba Junior Hockey League's (MJHL) 103rd year of operation. The league did not have a champion as the season was cancelled midway through the first round of the league playoffs due to the COVID-19 pandemic.

== Season notes ==
- The MJHL reduces the number of 20-year-old players permitted on each team's roster from eight to seven.
- The Portage Terriers are selected to host the 2020 Centennial Cup, the 50th season the National Junior 'A' Championship is to be played. This championship is later cancelled because of the COVID-19 pandemic.
- The Winnipeg Blues are sold to 50 Below Sports & Entertainment, Inc., which also owns the Winnipeg Ice of the Western Hockey League. The team relocates to The Rink Training Centre near Oak Bluff, just outside of Winnipeg.
- The annual Showcase takes place at Seven Oaks Arena in Winnipeg September 20–22, 2019.
- The MJHL and SJHL hold a joint showcase in Regina, Saskatchewan January 19–23, 2020.
- League Commissioner Kim Davis announces his retirement after 19 seasons.
- Hockey Canada and the Canadian Junior Hockey League cancel the remainder of the 2019-20 hockey season on March 12, 2020 due to the COVID-19 pandemic in Canada. This is the first season the Turnbull Cup has not been awarded since its creation in 1920.

== Standings ==
	GP	W	L	OTL	SOL	Pts	GF	GA
Steinbach Pistons	60	42	10	5	3	92	219	138
Portage Terriers	60	44	14	2	0	90	240	145
Winkler Flyers	60	38	17	2	3	81	223	185
Swan Valley Stampeders	60	35	19	5	1	76	222	186
Waywayseecappo Wolverines	60	32	21	5	3	71	206	199
Virden Oil Capitals	60	32	23	3	2	69	233	218
Dauphin Kings	60	31	24	3	2	67	223	213
Winnipeg Blues	60	24	29	6	1	55	197	236
Selkirk Steelers	60	23	30	6	1	53	178	219
OCN Blizzard	60	16	39	5	0	37	158	251
Neepawa Natives	60	13	43	1	3	30	137	246

== Playoffs ==
Playoff brackets at the time of cancellation on March 12, 2020.

Quarterfinals
1	Steinbach	4
8	Winnipeg	0
2	Portage	2
7	Dauphin	1
3	Winkler	1
6	Virden	2
4	Swan Valley	2
5	Waywayseecappo	1

Semifinals
1	Steinbach

Turnbull Cup Finals

=== Post MJHL playoffs ===
ANAVET Cup

- Cancelled as of March 12, 2020

Centennial Cup

- Portage Terriers (host team)
- Cancelled as of March 12, 2020

== League awards ==
- Steve "Boomer" Hawrysh Award (MVP): Grady Hobbs, Dauphin
- Ed Belfour Top Goaltender Trophy: Matt Lenz, Steinbach
- Brian Kozak Award (Top Defenceman): Drake Burgin, Winkler
- Vince Leah Trophy (Rookie of the Year): Carter Loney, Steinbach
- Frank McKinnon Memorial Trophy (Hockey Ability and Sportsmanship): Ty Naaykens, Steinbach
- Muzz McPherson Award (Coach of the Year): Kelvin Cech, Winkler
- Mike Ridley Trophy (Scoring Champion): Mikol Sartor, Winnipeg

== See also ==
- ANAVET Cup
- 2020 Centennial Cup
