= MJHL All Rookie Team =

The MJHL All-Rookie Team is chosen from the best rookies in the Manitoba Junior Hockey League. The All-Rookie team of individuals consists of one goalie, two defense-men and three forwards. Players on the team are selected at each position for the season based on their performance in that year. Selection for the team members occurs when the season ends in the Manitoba Junior Hockey League.

| Position | Player | Team |
1996
| Forward | Says Phrakonkham | Winnipeg Saints |
1999
| Forward | Junior Lessard | Portage Terriers |
2000
| Forward | Anders Strome | Winnipeg South Blues |
2001
| Defenceman | Steve Later | Winnipeg South Blues |
| Forward | Mark Agnew | Swan Valley Stampeders |
2002
| Goaltender | Karson Gillespie | Neepawa Natives |
| Forward | Blaine Jarvis | Neepawa Natives |
2003
| Defencemen | Riley Weselowski | Neepawa Natives |
| Defencemen | Nicholas Lubimiv | Portage Terriers |
| Forwards | Andrew Jackman | Portage Terriers |
| Forwards | Tim Hammell | Winnipeg Saints |
2004
| Forwards | Mark Magnowski | Winnipeg Saints |
| Forwards | Brock Trotter | Dauphin Kings |
2005
| Goaltender | Blaine Neufeld | Winkler Flyers |
| Defenceman | Jordan Pernarowski | Dauphin Kings |
| Forwards | Matt Ostash | Winkler Flyers |
| Forwards | Andrew Clark | Neepawa Natives |
| Forwards | Jordan Cyr | Selkirk Steelers |
2006
| Defenceman | Jeff Penner | Dauphin Kings |
| Forwards | Jason Gregoire | Winnipeg South Blues |
| Forwards | Matt Gingera | Winnipeg Saints |
2007
| Goaltender | Cody Pollon | Neepawa Natives |
| Defencemen | Remi Chartier | Winnipeg Saints |
| Defencemen | Edward Friesen | Waywayseecappo Wolverines |
| Forwards | Aaron Lewadniuk | Winkler Flyers |
| Forwards | Luke Stokotelny | Dauphin Kings |
| Forwards | Sean Collins | Waywayseecappo Wolverines |
2008
| Goaltender | Mathew Shenher | Selkirk Steelers |
| Defencemen | Scott Macaulay | Winnipeg Saints |
| Defencemen | Steven Shamanski | Dauphin Kings |
| Forwards | Stephan Vigier | Swan Valley Stampeders |
| Forwards | Eli Halcrow | Beausejour Blades |
| Forwards | Nick Lazorko | Winkler Flyers |
