= Perry Miller (ice hockey) =

Canadian ice hockey player

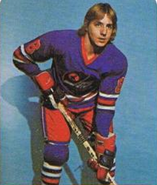
- Born: June 24, 1952 (age 74) Winnipeg, Manitoba, Canada
- Height: 6 ft 1 in (185 cm)
- Weight: 194 lb (88 kg; 13 st 12 lb)
- Position: Defence
- Shot: Left
- Played for: Winnipeg Jets; Minnesota Fighting Saints; Detroit Red Wings
- NHL draft: Undrafted
- WHA draft: Undrafted
- Playing career: 1972–1982

Perry Elvin Miller (born June 24, 1952, in Winnipeg, Manitoba) is a Canadian retired professional ice hockey player who played 201 games in the World Hockey Association and 217 games in the National Hockey League between 1974 and 1981. He played for the Minnesota Fighting Saints, Detroit Red Wings, and Winnipeg Jets. Following his hockey career, Miller joined GardaWorld in Winnipeg, where he serves as regional general manager.

== Awards and achievements ==
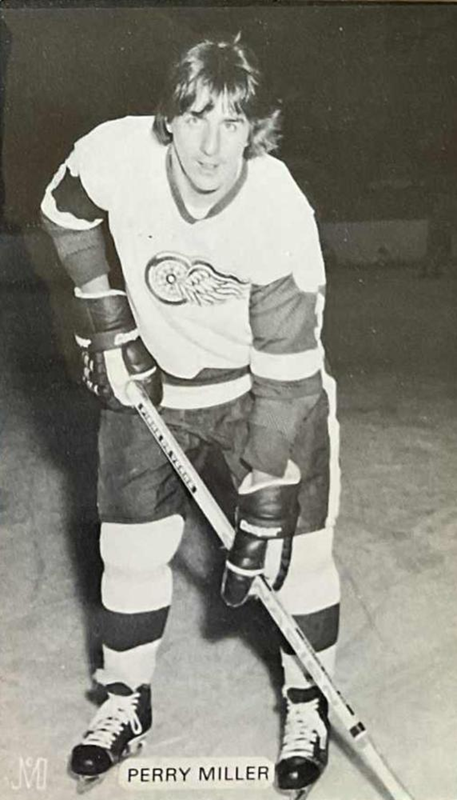
Miller with the Detroit Red Wings, c. 1977-1979

- SHL Second All-Star Team (1974)
- Honoured Member of the Manitoba Hockey Hall of Fame
- On 1 February 1977, Miller scored four times in an 11–1 rout over the Edmonton Oilers and set a WHA record for most goals by a defenceman in one game.

== Career statistics ==
=== Regular season and playoffs ===
			Regular season					Playoffs
Season	Team	League	GP	G	A	Pts	PIM	GP	G	A	Pts	PIM
1970–71	West Kildonan North Stars	MJHL	40	3	11	14	179	—	—	—	—	—
1971–72	West Kildonan North Stars	MJHL	39	15	23	38	187	—	—	—	—	—
1972–73	Charlotte Checkers	EHL	65	3	20	23	126	—	—	—	—	—
1973–74	Charlotte Checkers	SHL	66	12	31	43	203	13	5	8	13	35
1974–75	Winnipeg Jets	WHA	67	9	19	28	133	—	—	—	—	—
1975–76	Winnipeg Jets	WHA	47	7	6	13	41	—	—	—	—	—
1975–76	Minnesota Fighting Saints	WHA	13	1	4	5	11	—	—	—	—	—
1976–77	Winnipeg Jets	WHA	74	14	30	44	124	20	4	6	10	27
1977–78	Detroit Red Wings	NHL	62	4	17	21	120	—	—	—	—	—
1978–79	Detroit Red Wings	NHL	75	5	23	28	156	—	—	—	—	—
1979–80	Detroit Red Wings	NHL	16	0	3	3	41	—	—	—	—	—
1979–80	Adirondack Red Wings	AHL	55	9	27	36	155	5	3	0	3	6
1980–81	Detroit Red Wings	NHL	64	1	8	9	70	—	—	—	—	—
1980–81	Adirondack Red Wings	AHL	4	1	1	2	47	—	—	—	—	—
1981–82	Adirondack Red Wings	AHL	58	12	31	43	118	2	0	0	0	10
NHL totals			217	10	51	61	387	—	—	—	—	—
WHA totals			201	31	59	90	309	20	4	6	10	27
