= Murray Bannerman =

Canadian ice hockey player (born 1957)

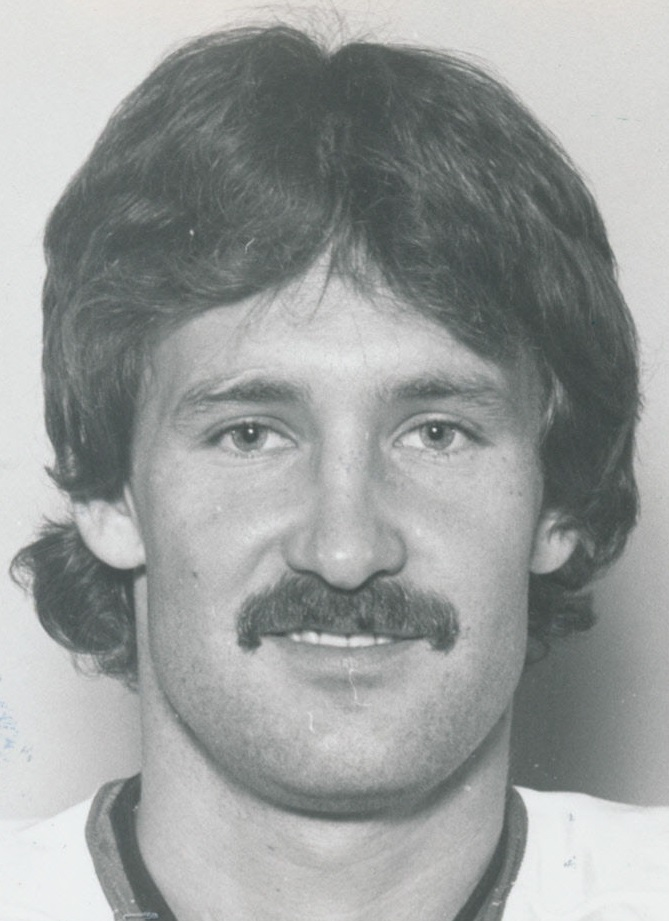
- Bannerman in 1985
- Born: April 27, 1957 (age 69) Fort Frances, Ontario, Canada
- Height: 5 ft 11 in (180 cm)
- Weight: 185 lb (84 kg; 13 st 3 lb)
- Position: Goaltender
- Caught: Left
- Played for: Vancouver Canucks; Chicago Blackhawks
- NHL draft: 58th overall, 1977; Vancouver Canucks
- WHA draft: 88th overall, 1977; Winnipeg Jets
- Playing career: 1977–1988

Murray Bannerman (born April 27, 1957) is a Canadian former ice hockey goaltender. He spent the majority of his career with the Chicago Blackhawks, though also briefly played for the Vancouver Canucks, who selected him in the 1977 NHL amateur draft.

== Playing career ==
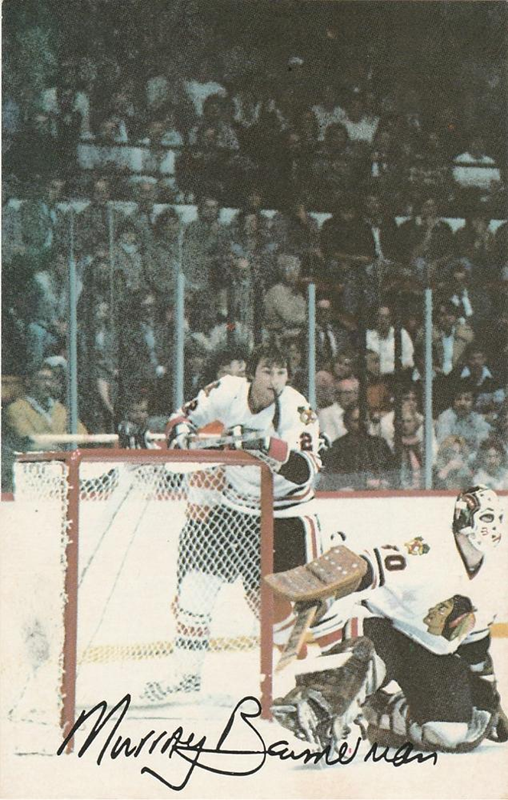
Bannerman in action for Chicago Blackhawks in 1981

Bannerman was born in Fort Frances, Ontario. As a youth, he played in the 1969 Quebec International Pee-Wee Hockey Tournament with a minor ice hockey team from Winnipeg.

His NHL career started with the Vancouver Canucks in the 1977 season, where he played one period for the team without allowing a goal making him the only goalie in Canucks history to not allow a goal. He spent most of his career with the Chicago Blackhawks. In 1983, he was a part of the Campbell Conference's roster at the 35th National Hockey League All-Star Game. Tony Esposito's backup for the early portion of his career, Bannerman finally got a chance to shine in the first round of the 1982 playoffs. He won his first two games-on the road-and powered his Chicago team to a series victory over the Minnesota North Stars. His career ended after the 1988 season.

He became the number one goaltender in Chicago the next season, with Esposito acting as his backup, and eventually tended goal twice in the NHL All-Star game for his yeoman work in the Chicago net. Bannerman was the 'player to be named later' when he came to Chicago in 1978. Pit Martin, once traded for Phil Esposito, was dealt by Chicago to Vancouver in 1977.

Bannerman sits fifth on the Blackhawks' all-time goaltender list with 116 wins and 288 games played. He finished with 3.83 goals against average and over 16,000 minutes played in a Chicago jersey. Bannerman is also fourth on the all-time Blackhawks' goaltender playoff statistics list with 20 wins and 40 games played.

== Post-playing career ==
Bannerman resides and works in the Chicago area. He still follows the Hawks and has many great memories of his time wearing the Indianhead. He fondly recalls the intensity of the fans back at the old Chicago Stadium. He also does periodic work for the Blackhawk Alumni Association.

As of 2019, Bannerman is the vice president of US sales for Traffic Tech, Inc. a Montreal-based transportation and logistics provider.

== Career statistics ==
=== Regular season and playoffs ===
| | | | Regular season | | | | | | | | | Playoffs |
| Season | Team | League | GP | W | L | T | Min | GA | SO | GAA | SV% | GP | W | L | T | Min | GA | SO | GAA | SV% |
|---|---|---|---|---|---|---|---|---|---|---|---|---|---|---|---|---|---|---|---|---|
| 1972–73 | St. James Canadians | MJHL | 31 | — | — | — | 1778 | 104 | 1 | 3.51 | — | — | — | — | — | — | — | — | — | — |
| 1973–74 | St. James Canadians | MJHL | 17 | — | — | — | 930 | 69 | 0 | 4.45 | .895 | — | — | — | — | — | — | — | — | — |
| 1973–74 | Winnipeg Clubs | WCHL | 6 | — | — | — | 258 | 29 | 0 | 6.74 | .793 | — | — | — | — | — | — | — | — | — |
| 1974–75 | Winnipeg Clubs | WCHL | 28 | 3 | 12 | 5 | 1351 | 113 | 0 | 5.02 | .847 | — | — | — | — | — | — | — | — | — |
| 1975–76 | Assiniboine Park Monarchs | MJHL | 8 | — | — | — | 480 | 22 | 1 | 2.75 | .904 | — | — | — | — | — | — | — | — | — |
| 1975–76 | Victoria Cougars | WCHL | 44 | 23 | 15 | 3 | 2450 | 178 | 1 | 4.36 | .860 | 15 | 7 | 5 | 3 | 878 | 50 | 0 | 3.42 | — |
| 1976–77 | Victoria Cougars | WCHL | 67 | — | — | — | 3893 | 262 | 2 | 4.04 | .893 | 4 | — | — | — | 234 | 20 | 0 | 5.13 | .861 |
| 1977–78 | Fort Wayne Komets | IHL | 44 | — | — | — | 2435 | 133 | 1 | 3.28 | — | 6 | — | — | — | 335 | 26 | 0 | 4.66 | — |
| 1977–78 | Vancouver Canucks | NHL | 1 | 0 | 0 | 0 | 20 | 0 | 0 | 0.00 | 1.000 | — | — | — | — | — | — | — | — | — |
| 1978–79 | New Brunswick Hawks | AHL | 47 | 22 | 14 | 5 | 2557 | 152 | 0 | 3.57 | .881 | 3 | 1 | 1 | — | 122 | 10 | 0 | 4.92 | — |
| 1979–80 | New Brunswick Hawks | AHL | 61 | 32 | 20 | 5 | 3361 | 186 | 3 | 3.32 | .874 | 17 | 10 | 6 | — | 1049 | 51 | 0 | 2.92 | — |
| 1980–81 | Chicago Black Hawks | NHL | 15 | 2 | 10 | 2 | 863 | 62 | 0 | 4.31 | .866 | — | — | — | — | — | — | — | — | — |
| 1981–82 | Chicago Black Hawks | NHL | 29 | 11 | 12 | 4 | 1667 | 116 | 1 | 4.18 | .867 | 10 | 5 | 4 | — | 555 | 35 | 0 | 3.79 | .886 |
| 1982–83 | Chicago Black Hawks | NHL | 41 | 24 | 12 | 5 | 2457 | 127 | 4 | 3.10 | .901 | 8 | 4 | 4 | — | 480 | 32 | 0 | 4.01 | .866 |
| 1983–84 | Chicago Black Hawks | NHL | 56 | 23 | 29 | 4 | 3326 | 188 | 2 | 3.39 | .887 | 5 | 2 | 3 | — | 299 | 17 | 0 | 3.41 | .900 |
| 1984–85 | Chicago Black Hawks | NHL | 60 | 27 | 25 | 4 | 3364 | 215 | 0 | 3.84 | .883 | 15 | 9 | 6 | — | 903 | 72 | 0 | 4.79 | .868 |
| 1985–86 | Chicago Black Hawks | NHL | 48 | 20 | 19 | 6 | 2680 | 201 | 1 | 4.50 | .869 | 2 | 0 | 1 | — | 82 | 9 | 0 | 6.65 | .775 |
| 1986–87 | Chicago Blackhawks | NHL | 39 | 9 | 18 | 8 | 2053 | 142 | 0 | 4.15 | .873 | — | — | — | — | — | — | — | — | — |
| 1987–88 | Baltimore Skipjacks | AHL | 41 | 6 | 21 | 5 | 2014 | 154 | 0 | 4.59 | .865 | — | — | — | — | — | — | — | — | — |
| 1987–88 | Saginaw Hawks | IHL | 3 | 0 | 2 | 0 | 140 | 15 | 0 | 6.43 | — | — | — | — | — | — | — | — | — | — |
| NHL totals | | | 289 | 116 | 125 | 33 | 16,427 | 1051 | 8 | 3.84 | .880 | 40 | 20 | 18 | — | 2319 | 165 | 0 | 4.27 | .873 |

== Awards and achievements ==
- MJHL Second All-Star Team (1973)
- MJHL top goaltender (1973)
