= Curt Ridley =

Canadian ice hockey player (1951–2021)

- Born: September 24, 1951 Minnedosa, Manitoba, Canada
- Died: December 19, 2021 (aged 70) Dallas, Texas, U.S.
- Height: 6 ft 0 in (183 cm)
- Weight: 180 lb (82 kg; 12 st 12 lb)
- Position: Goaltender
- Caught: Left
- Played for: New York Rangers; Vancouver Canucks; Toronto Maple Leafs
- NHL draft: 28th overall, 1971; Boston Bruins
- Playing career: 1971–1982

Charles Curtis Ridley (September 24, 1951 – December 19, 2021) was a Canadian ice hockey goaltender. He played in the National Hockey League between 1974 and 1981.

Ridley was born in Minnedosa, Manitoba, and raised in Portage la Prairie.

He started out playing for the Portage Terriers of the Manitoba Junior Hockey League, and was also called up to the Brandon Wheat Kings during the 1970-71 season. He was then drafted by the Boston Bruins in the second round of the 1971 NHL Amateur Draft. This made him the first player to ever be drafted directly from Tier II Junior A (now Junior A). He played for Bruins affiliates the Oklahoma City Blazers and Dayton Gems for three years.

He saw his first National Hockey League play time with the New York Rangers. Over the next few years, he played for several teams in the NHL as well as the Central Hockey League. His NHL career ultimately included 104 games between the New York Rangers, Vancouver Canucks, and Toronto Maple Leafs between 1974 and 1980.

He was inducted to the Manitoba Hockey Hall of Fame in 2015.

After finishing his playing career, Ridley lived in Winnipeg, and sold telephone systems and wireless communications. He later moved to Dallas. Curt Ridley died on December 19, 2021, at the age of 70.

== Career statistics ==
=== Regular season and playoffs ===
			Regular season									Playoffs
Season	Team	League	GP	W	L	T	MIN	GA	SO	GAA	SV%	GP	W	L	MIN	GA	SO	GAA	SV%
1968–69	Portage Terriers	MJHL	—	—	—	—	—	—	—	—	—	—	—	—	—	—	—	—	—
1969–70	Portage Terriers	MJHL	23	—	—	—	—	90	0	3.86	—	—	—	—	—	—	—	—	—
1970–71	Portage Terriers	MJHL	45	—	—	—	2685	148	5	3.31	.922	—	—	—	—	—	—	—	—
1970–71	Brandon Wheat Kings	WCHL	5	—	—	—	299	14	0	2.81	—	—	—	—	—	—	—	—	—
1971–72	Oklahoma City Blazers	CHL	41	12	18	4	1869	127	1	4.07	—	1	0	1	42	5	0	7.14	—
1972–73	Dayton Gems	IHL	56	—	—	—	3217	145	2	2.70	—	6	3	3	360	19	0	3.17	—
1972–73	Boston Braves	AHL	—	—	—	—	—	—	—	—	—	4	0	3	192	17	0	5.31	—
1973–74	Providence Reds	AHL	39	19	11	6	2234	107	1	2.87	—	1	1	0	60	4	0	4.00	—
1974–75	New York Rangers	NHL	2	1	1	0	81	7	0	5.19	.833	—	—	—	—	—	—	—	—
1974–75	Providence Reds	AHL	57	32	14	9	3311	181	1	3.27	.896	6	2	4	373	24	0	3.86	—
1975–76	Vancouver Canucks	NHL	9	6	0	2	500	19	1	2.28	.916	2	0	2	119	8	0	4.03	.875
1975–76	Tulsa Oilers	CHL	30	15	10	5	1779	79	2	2.66	—	—	—	—	—	—	—	—	—
1976–77	Vancouver Canucks	NHL	37	8	21	4	2070	134	0	3.88	.871	—	—	—	—	—	—	—	—
1977–78	Vancouver Canucks	NHL	40	9	17	8	2007	136	0	4.07	.868	—	—	—	—	—	—	—	—
1978–79	Dallas Black Hawks	CHL	33	22	10	0	1871	115	1	3.69	.821	9	8	1	520	26	0	3.00	—
1979–80	Vancouver Canucks	NHL	10	2	6	2	595	39	0	3.93	.865	—	—	—	—	—	—	—	—
1979–80	Toronto Maple Leafs	NHL	3	0	1	0	109	8	0	4.38	.890	—	—	—	—	—	—	—	—
1979–80	Dallas Black Hawks	CHL	4	0	4	0	218	0	21	5.78	.821	—	—	—	—	—	—	—	—
1980–81	Toronto Maple Leafs	NHL	3	1	1	0	124	12	0	5.80	.836	—	—	—	—	—	—	—	—
1980–81	New Brunswick Hawks	AHL	2	1	1	0	120	7	0	3.50	.854	—	—	—	—	—	—	—	—
1981–82	Cincinnati Tigers	CHL	22	10	6	1	1043	73	0	4.20	.862	1	0	1	63	3	0	2.86	—
NHL totals			104	27	47	16	5486	355	1	3.88	.872	2	0	2	119	8	0	4.03	.875

== Awards and achievements ==
- MJHL First All-Star Team (1971)
