= Rick Blight =

Canadian ice hockey player (1955–2005)

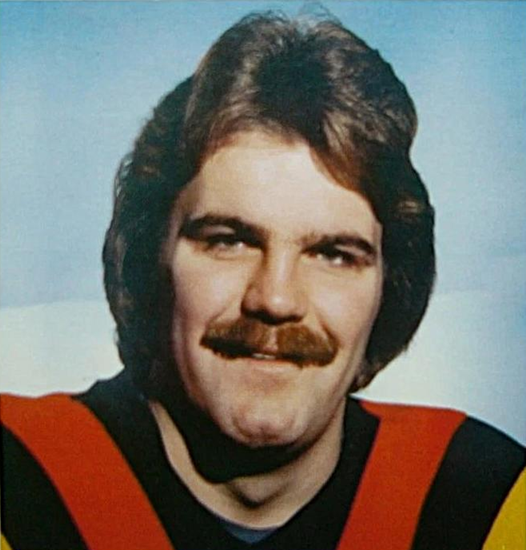
- Blight in 1979 photo
- Born: October 17, 1955 Portage la Prairie, Manitoba, Canada
- Died: April 3, 2005 (aged 49) Portage la Prairie, Manitoba, Canada
- Height: 6 ft 2 in (188 cm)
- Weight: 195 lb (88 kg; 13 st 13 lb)
- Position: Right wing
- Shot: Right
- Played for: Vancouver Canucks; Los Angeles Kings
- National team: Canada
- NHL draft: 10th overall, 1975; Vancouver Canucks
- WHA draft: 19th overall, 1974; Michigan Stags
- Playing career: 1975–1983

Richard Derek Blight (October 17, 1955 – April 3, 2005) was a Canadian ice hockey player.

A native of Portage la Prairie, Manitoba, Blight had a long and varied hockey career as a Right wing for teams in the National Hockey League (NHL), Central Hockey League (CHL) and the American Hockey League (AHL). After playing junior hockey in the Manitoba Junior Hockey League and the Western Hockey League, Blight was selected by the Vancouver Canucks in the first round of the 1975 NHL Amateur Draft. Blight was also drafted by the Michigan Stags in the second round of the 1974 WHA Amateur Draft, but did not play in the WHA. The name Blight is of Cornish origin.

== Playing career ==
Blight was the Canucks' top scorer over his first three years in the NHL, finishing fifth, first and second in team scoring in 1975, 1976 and 1977 with a total of 187 points.

Blight was the recipient of the WCHL Rookie of the Year Award in 1973 and was a member of the CHL Second All-Star Team in 1981.

Blight retired from playing hockey in 1983 and began a career as a stockbroker and marketing consultant, as well as managing his family farm in his native Manitoba. In 1995, Blight was inducted into the Manitoba Sports Hall of Fame. Blight also curled during this time, and was a member of the Don Spriggs curling team.

On April 3, 2005, Blight disappeared. Two weeks later, on April 18, after a Canada-wide search, Blight was found dead in a field on a farm near Lake Manitoba in his pickup truck. He had died by suicide.

== Awards and achievements ==
- 1973: WCHL Rookie of the Year
- 1981: CHL Second All-Star Team
- Honoured Member of the Manitoba Hockey Hall of Fame

== Career statistics ==
=== Regular season and playoffs ===
			Regular season					Playoffs
Season	Team	League	GP	G	A	Pts	PIM	GP	G	A	Pts	PIM
1970–71	Portage Terriers	MJHL	47	20	19	39	33	—	—	—	—	—
1971–72	Portage Terriers	MJHL	45	32	35	67	73	—	—	—	—	—
1971–72	Brandon Wheat Kings	WCHL	1	1	0	1	0	11	3	1	4	8
1972–73	Brandon Wheat Kings	WCHL	68	31	62	93	70	6	0	1	1	0
1973–74	Brandon Wheat Kings	WCHL	67	49	81	130	122	6	0	1	1	0
1974–75	Brandon Wheat Kings	WCHL	65	60	52	112	65	5	2	3	5	6
1975–76	Vancouver Canucks	NHL	74	25	31	56	29	2	0	1	1	0
1976–77	Vancouver Canucks	NHL	78	28	40	68	32	—	—	—	—	—
1977–78	Vancouver Canucks	NHL	80	25	38	63	33	—	—	—	—	—
1978–79	Dallas Black Hawks	CHL	15	8	7	15	7	—	—	—	—	—
1978–79	Vancouver Canucks	NHL	56	5	10	15	16	3	0	4	4	2
1979–80	Vancouver Canucks	NHL	33	12	6	18	54	—	—	—	—	—
1980–81	Dallas Black Hawks	CHL	74	46	49	95	122	6	0	3	3	9
1980–81	Vancouver Canucks	NHL	3	1	0	1	4	—	—	—	—	—
1981–82	Cincinnati Tigers	CHL	37	16	23	39	21	—	—	—	—	—
1981–82	SC Bern	NDA	—	—	—	—	—	—	—	—	—	—
1981–82	Wichita Wind	CHL	16	18	14	32	18	7	3	0	3	6
1982–83	Moncton Alpines	AHL	19	8	7	15	6	—	—	—	—	—
1982–83	New Haven Nighthawks	AHL	47	17	24	41	8	12	2	3	5	4
1982–83	Los Angeles Kings	NHL	2	0	0	0	2	—	—	—	—	—
NHL totals			326	96	125	221	170	5	0	5	5	2

=== International ===
Year	Team	Event	GP	G	A	Pts	PIM
1975	Canada	WJC	6	2	2	4	4
Junior totals			6	2	2	4	4

== Personal ==
His niece, Halli Krzyzaniak, played in the Canadian Women's Hockey League for the Calgary Inferno.

Preceded by Bob Dailey	Vancouver Canucks first-round draft pick 1975	Succeeded by Jere Gillis
