= 1968–69 MJHL season =

Manitoba ice hockey season

== Champion ==
On March 19, 1969, in St. Boniface, the Dauphin Kings were crowned MJHL Champions, capturing the Turnbull Memorial Trophy. The Kings trounced the St. Boniface Saints 5-1, to swept the best of seven in four straight games.

== League notes ==
The MJHL merged with the Central Manitoba Junior Hockey League creating a North Division to house all 4 new teams, the Selkirk Steelers, Portage Terriers, Dauphin Kings, and Kenora Muskies (who operated out of Fort Garry the previous year). The existing teams created the South Division.

== Regular season ==
North Division	GP	W	L	T	Pts	GF	GA
Dauphin Kings	34	25	8	1	51	226	122
Selkirk Steelers	34	23	9	2	48	195	116
Kenora Muskies	34	13	21	0	26	177	190
Portage Terriers	34	3	28	3	9	104	236

South Division	GP	W	L	T	Pts	GF	GA
Winnipeg Monarchs	34	17	12	5	39	145	157
St. Boniface Saints	34	18	14	2	38	145	126
St. James Canadians	34	16	14	4	36	142	146
West Kildonan North Stars	34	12	21	1	25	130	171

== All-Star Games ==
The League's North Division All-Stars pumped in three goals in the opening 20 minutes and then cruised their way to an easy 6-0 win over the South Division selects in Portage on a stormy January 8. Ken McCluskey, Curt Ridley and Ron Low shared the shut-out. Each handled 10 shots during their 20-minute stints. Mickey Walsh went all the way for the South facing 43 shots. Ken George scored a pair, Chuck Arnason, Ron Ramsey, Moe Brunel, and Clayton Kemp added singles.

North Division Lineup:

- Goal: Ken McCluskey (Selkirk); Curt Ridley (Portage); Ron Low (Dauphin)
- Defence: Hugh Moran (Portage); John Roy (Dauphin);
- Forwards: Chuck Arnason (Selkirk); Moe Brunel (Selkirk); Ken George (Kenora); Clayton Kemp (Dauphin); Ed Larkin (Portage); Ron Ramsey (Selkirk); Bob Saull (Portage); Tom Thomsen (Kenora);

South Division Lineup:

- Goal: Mickey Walsh (St. Boniface);
- Defence: John Neil (West Kildonan); Bill Palmer (St. Boniface); Rich Tathum (St. James)
- Coach: Muzz MacPherson (Winnipeg)

On January 10, the South Division All-Stars trounced their Japanese visitors, the Seibu hockey club, 7-2 at the St. James Civic Centre. The All-Stars led 3-1 and 4-2 by periods. Four St. Boniface players, Rick Sedgewick, Wayne Altomare, Brian Clague and Wayne Albo scored. Jim Johnston of St. James, John Neil of West Kildonan, and Brian Harding of Winnipeg scored the other Stars goals. Koji Iwimpto and Mel Wakabayashi replied for Seibu.
MJHL Lineup:

- Goal: Mickey Walsh (St. Boniface); Dan Stephens (St. James)
- Defence: Bob Winograd (Winnipeg); Terry Proctor (St. Boniface); Bill Palmer (St. Boniface);
  Rich Tathum (St. James); Terry Taylor (St. James); John Neil (West Kildonan)
- Centre: Wally McCheyne (Winnipeg); Pierre Chartier (St. James);
  Rick Sedgwick (St. Boniface); Wayne Altomare (St. Boniface)
- Leftwing: Brian Howie (West Kildonan); Lanny Gregory (Winnipeg);
  Wayne Albo (St. Boniface); Brian Clague (St. Boniface)
- Rightwing: Jim Johnston (St. James); Dan Hiebert (St. Boniface);
  Dave McConachy (St. James); Brian Harding (Winnipeg)
- Coach Al Tesoor (St. Boniface)

On January 24, in Dauphin Canadian born Mel Wakabayshi scored three goals to spark Seibu of Japan to an 8-6 victory over the North Division All-Stars before a capacity crowd of more than 2,500. Japan led 3-1 and 6-3 by periods. Rounding out the Japanese scoring were Norio Fukuda, Fumio Yamazaki, Isamu Owata, Tadashi Makawama and Koji Iwamato. Bob Leguilloux of Dauphin and Chuck Arnason of Selkirk scored two goals each. Jim Cahoon of Dauphin and Terry Hart of Selkirk got the other all-star goals.

== Playoffs ==
Divisional Semi-Finals

Selkirk lost to Kenora 4-games-to-1
St. Boniface defeated St. James 4-games-to-2

Divisional Finals

Dauphin defeated Kenora 4-games-to-2
Winnipeg lost to St. Boniface 4-games-to-3

Turnbull Cup Championship

Dauphin defeated St. Boniface 4-games-to-none

Western Memorial Cup Semi-Final

Dauphin defeated Westfort Hurricanes (TBJHL) 4-games-to-2

Western Memorial Cup Final (Abbott Cup)

Dauphin lost to Regina Pats (SJHL) 4-games-to-3

=== Scoring leaders ===
Player	Team	GP	G	A	Pts
Dennis Schick	Dauphin Kings	34	34	50	84
Jim Cahoon	Dauphin Kings	33	27	48	75
Chuck Arnason	Selkirk Steelers	34	36	37	73
Ron Ramsey	Selkirk Steelers	34	23	41	64
Bob Buchy	Dauphin Kings	34	22	41	63
Brian Harding	Winnipeg Monarchs	33	24	37	61
Bob Leguilloux	Dauphin Kings	29	32	24	56
Norm Cherrey	Selkirk Steelers	34	27	29	56
Ken George	Kenora Muskies	34	27	28	55
Terry Hart	Selkirk Steelers	32	25	26	51

== Awards ==
Trophy	Winner	Team
MVP		
Top Goaltender		
Rookie of the Year	Jim Cahoon	Dauphin Kings
Hockey Ability & Sportsmanship Award		
Scoring Champion	Dennis Schick	Dauphin Kings
