= Chuck Arnason =

Canadian ice hockey player (born 1951)

- Born: July 15, 1951 (age 75) Dauphin, Manitoba, Canada
- Height: 5 ft 10 in (178 cm)
- Weight: 180 lb (82 kg; 12 st 12 lb)
- Position: Right wing
- Shot: Right
- Played for: Montreal Canadiens; Atlanta Flames; Pittsburgh Penguins; Kansas City Scouts; Cleveland Barons; Colorado Rockies; Minnesota North Stars; Washington Capitals
- NHL draft: 7th overall, 1971; Montreal Canadiens
- Playing career: 1971–1980

Ernest Charles Arnason (born July 15, 1951) is a Canadian former professional ice hockey right wing who played 401 games over eight seasons in the National Hockey League (NHL) for the Montreal Canadiens, Atlanta Flames, Pittsburgh Penguins, Kansas City Scouts, Cleveland Barons, Colorado Rockies, Minnesota North Stars and Washington Capitals. He was the first player in NHL history to play for five defunct teams.

== Personal life ==
Arnason was born in Dauphin, Manitoba and raised in Ashern, Manitoba.

Arnason and his wife Leanne have two children, a son, Tyler who played in the NHL from 2001 to 2009 and a daughter, Aubrey who is an actress and screenwriter.

== Awards and achievements ==
- MJHL Goal Scoring Leader (1969)
- WCHL Scoring Champion (1971)
- WCHL Goals Leader (1971)
- WCHL All-Star Team (1971)
- Honoured Member of the Manitoba Hockey Hall of Fame

== Career statistics ==
=== Regular season and playoffs ===
			Regular season					Playoffs
Season	Team	League	GP	G	A	Pts	PIM	GP	G	A	Pts	PIM
1968–69	Selkirk Fishermen	CMJHL	34	36	37	73	—	—	—	—	—	—
1969–70	Flin Flon Bombers	WCHL	60	34	27	61	91	17	14	18	32	38
1970–71	Flin Flon Bombers	WCHL	66	79	84	163	153	17	15	22	37	30
1971–72	Nova Scotia Voyageurs	AHL	58	30	24	54	33	15	7	6	13	6
1971–72	Montreal Canadiens	NHL	17	3	0	3	4	—	—	—	—	—
1972–73	Nova Scotia Voyageurs	AHL	38	18	20	38	4	13	5	10	15	16
1972–73	Montreal Canadiens	NHL	19	1	1	2	2	—	—	—	—	—
1973–74	Atlanta Flames	NHL	33	7	6	13	13	—	—	—	—	—
1973–74	Pittsburgh Penguins	NHL	41	13	5	18	4	—	—	—	—	—
1974–75	Pittsburgh Penguins	NHL	78	26	32	58	32	9	2	4	6	4
1975–76	Pittsburgh Penguins	NHL	30	7	3	10	14	—	—	—	—	—
1975–76	Kansas City Scouts	NHL	39	14	10	24	21	—	—	—	—	—
1976–77	Colorado Rockies	NHL	61	13	10	23	10	—	—	—	—	—
1977–78	Colorado Rockies	NHL	29	4	8	12	10	—	—	—	—	—
1977–78	Cleveland Barons	NHL	40	21	13	34	8	—	—	—	—	—
1977–78	Phoenix Roadrunners	CHL	6	3	3	6	4	—	—	—	—	—
1978–79	Oklahoma City Stars	CHL	60	24	22	46	42	—	—	—	—	—
1978–79	Minnesota North Stars	NHL	1	0	0	0	0	—	—	—	—	—
1978–79	Washington Capitals	NHL	13	0	2	2	4	—	—	—	—	—
1979–80	Dallas Black Hawks	CHL	68	15	17	32	28	—	—	—	—	—
1980–81	Kölner EC	1.GBun	16	5	7	12	10	—	—	—	—	—
NHL totals			401	109	90	199	122	9	2	4	6	4

== Transactions ==
- On June 10, 1971 the Montreal Canadiens selected Chuck Arnason in the first-round (#7 overall) of the 1971 NHL draft.
- On May 29, 1973 the Montreal Canadiens traded Chuck Arnason to the Atlanta Flames in exchange for a 1974 first-round pick (#10-Rick Chartraw).
- On January 4, 1974 the Atlanta Flames traded Chuck Arnason and Bob Paradise to the Pittsburgh Penguins in exchange for Al McDonough.
- On January 9, 1976 the Pittsburgh Penguins traded Chuck Arnason, Steve Durbano and a 1976 first-round pick (#11-Paul Gardner) to the Kansas City Scouts in exchange for Simon Nolet, Ed Gilbert and a 1976 first-round pick (#2-Blair Chapman).
- On July 15, 1976 the Kansas City Scouts moved to Colorado and renamed Colorado Rockies.
- On January 9, 1978 the Colorado Rockies traded Chuck Arnason and Rick Jodzio to the Cleveland Barons in exchange for Ralph Klassen and Fred Ahern.
- On June 15, 1978 Chuck Arnason was placed on the Minnesota North Stars reserve list following Cleveland Barons/Minnesota North Stars merger.
- On March 12, 1979 the Minnesota North Stars traded Chuck Arnason to the Washington Capitals for future considerations.
- On April 24, 1979 the Washington Capitals traded Chuck Arnason to the Minnesota North Stars for future considerations.
- On July 19, 1979 the Minnesota North Stars traded Chuck Arnason to the Vancouver Canucks for cash.

Preceded by Guy Lafleur	Montreal Canadiens first-round draft pick 1971	Succeeded by Murray Wilson
