= 1967–68 MJHL season =

Manitoba ice hockey season

On March 14, 1968, at home in St. James, the St. James Canadians corralled the Manitoba Junior Hockey League championship, and on March 26, in Selkirk, the Canadians captured the Turnbull Cup defeating the Central Manitoba Junior Hockey League champions Selkirk Steelers.

== League notes ==
During the summer of 1967, the MAHA agreed to allow three teams to enter the WCHL: the Brandon Wheat Kings and the Flin Flon Bombers from the MJHL, and the Ben Hatskin-owned Winnipeg Jets. Hatskin also owned three MJHL teams. Part of the agreement was the continuation of the MJHL; Hatskin sold his three teams to local interests, and the Winnipeg Warriors became the West Kildonan North Stars, the St. James Braves became the St. James Canadians, and the Winnipeg Rangers became the St. Boniface Saints. These three teams joined the Winnipeg Monarchs to form the new MJHL. The Selkirk Steelers however joined the Central Manitoba Junior Hockey League.

The league dropped the final three games of the regular season in order to accommodate Memorial Cup playoff elimination series within the province with the Central Manitoba Junior Hockey League.

== Regular season ==
League Standings	GP	W	L	T	Pts	GF	GA
Winnipeg Monarchs	36	20	13	3	43	200	157
St. Boniface Saints	36	18	17	1	37	157	152
West Kildonan North Stars	35	17	18	0	34	151	189
St. James Canadians	37	14	21	2	30	155	165

== Playoffs ==
Semi-Finals

Winnipeg lost to West Kildonan 4-games-to-1
St. Boniface lost to St. James 4-games-to-1

Final

West Kildonan lost to St. James 4-games-to-none

Turnbull Cup Championship

St. James defeated Selkirk Steelers (CMJHL) 4-games-to-2

Western Memorial Cup Semi-Final

St. James lost to Westfort Hurricanes (TBJHL) 4-games-to-2

== Awards ==
Trophy	Winner	Team
MVP	Jim Trosky	St. Boniface Saints
Top Goaltender	Alan Hanna	Winnipeg Monarchs
Rookie of the Year	Wayne Chernecki	West Kildonan North Stars
Hockey Ability & Sportsmanship Award	Andy Miles	Winnipeg Monarchs
Scoring Champion	Wayne Chernecki	West Kildonan North Stars
Most Goals	Wayne Chernecki	West Kildonan North Stars
Coach of the Year	Jim Walker	St. James Canadians

== All-Star teams ==
1968 First All-Star Team
Goaltender	Alan Hanna	Winnipeg Monarchs
Defencemen	Jim Trosky	St. Boniface Saints
Defencemen	Al White	Winnipeg Monarchs
Centreman	Wayne Chernecki	West Kildonan North Stars
Leftwinger (tie)	Andy Van Hellemond	St. James Canadians
Leftwinger (tie)	Brian Howie	West Kildonan North Stars
Rightwinger	Brian Stephenson	Winnipeg Monarchs
1968 Second All-Star Team
Goaltender	Allan Loewen	St. James Canadians
Defencemen	Ken Friesen	St. Boniface Saints
Defencemen	Jim Gair	West Kildonan North Stars
Centreman	Chris Oddleifson	Winnipeg Monarchs
Wingers	Jim Malcolm	Winnipeg Monarchs
Wingers	Andy Miles	Winnipeg Monarchs
