= Ben Hatskin =

Canadian businessman (1917–1990)

Benjamin Hatskin (September 30, 1917 – October 18, 1990) was a Canadian businessman and the founder of the Winnipeg Jets.

Ben Hatskin

== Early life and education ==
Ben Hatskin was born in 1917 in Winnipeg to Russian-Jewish parents. As a standout football player in high school, he became one of the first Canadian students to win an athletic scholarship to an American university. He played football for the Sooners at the University of Oklahoma. He also played junior hockey in Winnipeg with the 1936 Kildonan Stars. In 1936, Hatskin signed with the Winnipeg Blue Bombers of the CFL, playing six years and helping the team win Grey Cup championships in 1939 and 1941.

== Business career ==
During World War II Hatskin began raising racehorses and his wealth grew as the Hatskin family invested in everything from lumber companies to juke box distributorships.

== Winnipeg Jets ==
Ben Hatskin founded the Winnipeg Jets who joined the Western Canada Junior Hockey League in 1967. In 1967, Hatskin tried to win a National Hockey League franchise during the league's expansion. His bid failed, which fueled his desire to help create a new, rival league, the World Hockey Association, in 1972. Hatskin knew that the credibility of the WHA depended on getting established hockey stars to join its teams. He aggressively sought out the services of Bobby Hull for his team, the Winnipeg Jets, and eventually signed Hull to a contract estimated to be worth at least $1.75 million.

Although it was one of the more successful teams in the WHA, winning 3 Avco Cups in 1976, 1978 and 1979. Hatskin had to ask for a public subsidy to keep the financially troubled Jets alive after 1974.

The team was absorbed into the NHL in 1979 with Hatskin selling the Jets to Barry Shenkarow. The club later relocated to Arizona and became the Phoenix Coyotes following the 1995-96 season.

== Honours ==
The Ben Hatskin Trophy given to the WHA's best goaltender was named in his honour.

In 2010, he was elected as an inaugural inductee into the World Hockey Association Hall of Fame in the builders category. He was also a member of the Manitoba Sports Hall of Fame.
