= 1976–77 MJHL season =

Manitoba ice hockey season

The following are the results of the 1976–77 MJHL season for the Canadian Manitoba Junior Hockey League ice hockey team.

== Champion ==
On April 5, 1977, Manitoba Junior Hockey League (MJHL) commissioner Bill Addison suspended the Turnbull Cup Finals between the Dauphin Kings and Kildonan North Stars, awarding it to Dauphin on the basis they won two of the three games completed.

== League notes ==
As of the 1976-77 season, the West Kildonan name was shorted to the Kildonan North Stars.
Jim Misener of the Dauphin Kings became the MJHL career leader in goals, assists, and points, with 205 goals, 208 assists, and 413 points.
League suspends Turnbull Cup Finals, awards it to Dauphin.

== Regular season ==
North Division	GP	W	L	T	Pts	GF	GA
Thompson King Miners	49	19	28	2	40	201	252
Portage Terriers	52	17	35	0	34	214	287

South Division	GP	W	L	T	Pts	GF	GA

== Playoffs ==
Division Semi-Finals

Dauphin defeated Thompson 4-games-to-none
Brandon defeated Selkirk 4-games-to-3
Kildonan defeated St. James 4-games-to-1
Kenora defeated St. Boniface 4-games-to-2

Divisional Finals

Dauphin defeated Brandon 4-games-to-none
Kildonan defeated Kenora 4-games-to-3

Turnbull Cup Championship

Dauphin defeated Kildonan 2-games-to-1

Anavet Cup Championship

Dauphin lost to Prince Albert Raiders (SJHL) 4-games-to-1

== Awards ==
Trophy	Winner	Team
MVP	Jim Misener	Dauphin Kings
Top Goaltender	Jim Tkachyk	Dauphin Kings
Top Defenceman	Mark Johnston	Portage Terriers
Rookie of the Year	Bruno Rogger	Brandon Travellers
Hockey Ability & Sportsmanship Award	Ken Krentz	Selkirk Steelers
Scoring Champion	Ken Krentz	Selkirk Steelers
Most Goals	Dale Maksymyk	Selkirk Steelers
Coach of the Year		

== All-Star Team ==
1977 First All-Star Team
Goaltender	Jim Tkachyk	Dauphin Kings
Defencemen	Mark Johnston	Portage Terriers
Defencemen	Dan Bryck	Kenora Thistles
Centreman	Ken Krentz	Selkirk Steelers
Leftwinger	Dale Maksymyk	Selkirk Steelers
Rightwinger	Jim Misener	Dauphin Kings
Coach	Phil Fafard	Kenora Thistles
Manager	Steve Hawrysh	Dauphin Kings
Trainer	Daryl Steen	St. Boniface Saints
