= Tomio Yamazaki =

Japanese ice hockey player

Personal information
- Nationality: Japanese
- Born: 7 August 1947 (age 78) Tochigi, Japan

Sport
- Sport: Ice hockey

Achievements and titles
- Olympic finals: 1972 Winter Olympics

Tomio Yamazaki (山崎 富美雄, Yamazaki Tomio; born 7 August 1947) is a Japanese ice hockey player. He competed in the men's tournament at the 1972 Winter Olympics.
