= Dauphin Kings =

Junior ice hockey team

- City: Dauphin, Manitoba
- League: MJHL
- Division: West
- Founded: 1967
- Home arena: Credit Union Place
- Colours
- General manager: Bryan Kromm
- Head coach: Bryan Kromm

Previous franchise history
- 1967–1968: CMJHL

Championships
- League: 1969; 1970; 1972; 1977; 1983; 1993; 2010; 2022
- Regional: 1983; 2010

The Dauphin Kings are a junior ice hockey club in the Manitoba Junior Hockey League (MJHL). The team plays its home games at the Credit Union Place in Dauphin, Manitoba.

== History ==
The Dauphin Kings joined the Manitoba Junior Hockey League (MJHL), along with the Selkirk Steelers, Portage Terriers and Fort Garry Frontiersmen, through the league's merger with the Central Manitoba Junior Hockey League (CMJHL), in 1968.

The Kings won the league championship Turnbull Cup in 1969, 1970, 1972, 1977, 1983, 1993, 2010 and 2022.

The Kings won the regional championship ANAVET Cup in 1983 and 2010.

The 2009–10 Kings competed in the 2010 Royal Bank Cup national championship tournament and lost in the final against the defending Vernon Vipers.

The 2013–14 Kings competed in the 2014 Royal Bank Cup national championship tournament and lost in overtime of the quarterfinal against the Yorkton Terriers.

The 2021–22 Kings competed in the 2022 Centennial Cup national championship tournament and lost in the semifinal against the Pickering Panthers.

Dauphin Kings logo (2001–2018)

== Season-by-season record ==
Statistics
Season	GP	W	L	T	OTL	SOL	GF	GA	Pts	Regular season	Post-season
1968–69	34	25	8	1	0	0	226	122	51	1st in division 1st overall	Won final against St. Boniface
1969–70	34	22	7	5	0	0	193	130	49	1st in division 1st overall	Won final
1970–71	48	28	17	3	0	0	224	176	59	3rd in division 3rd overall	Lost quarterfinal against Kenora (4:3)
1971–72	48	40	8	0	0	0	304	171	80	1st in division 1st overall	Won quarterfinal against Selkirk (4:0); Won semifinal against Portage (4:0); Won final against West Kildonan (4:0)
1972–73	48	18	30	0	0	0	201	266	36	4th in division 8th overall	Did not qualify
1973–74	48	15	32	1	0	0	206	278	31	4th in division 7th overall	Did not qualify
1974–75	48	25	23	0	0	0	289	277	50	3rd in division 5th overall	Lost quarterfinal against Portage (4:0)
1975–76	52	23	29	0	0	0	256	267	46	4th in division 8th overall	Lost quarterfinal against Selkirk (4:1)
1976–77	52	35	14	3	0	0	305	196	73	1st in division 1st overall	Won quarterfinal against Thompson (4:0); Won semifinal against Brandon (4:0); Won final against Kildonan (2:1, series suspended)
1977–78	52	33	16	3	0	0	262	194	69	2nd in division 2nd overall	Won quarterfinal against Brandon (4:2); Won semifinal against Selkirk (4:3); Lost final against Kildonan (4:3)
1978–79	48	22	25	1	0	0	247	272	45	3rd in division 6th overall	Lost quarterfinal against Portage (4:3)
1979–80	47	19	25	3	0	0	247	264	41	2nd in division 7th overall	Won quarterfinal against Brandon (4:2); Lost semifinal against Selkirk (4:1)
1980–81	48	18	27	3	0	0	243	313	39	3rd in division 6th overall	Won quarterfinal against Kildonan (4:0); Lost semifinal against Selkirk (4:1)
1981–82	48	28	20	0	0	0	275	248	56	2nd in division 4th overall	Won quarterfinal against Winkler (4:2); Won semifinal against Selkirk (4:0); Lost final against Fort Garry (4:0)
1982–83	48	34	13	1	0	0	353	234	69	1st in division 1st overall	Won quarterfinal against Portage (4:0); Won semifinal against Winkler (4:2); Won final against St. Boniface (4:1)
1983–84	48	36	12	0	0	0	304	193	72	1st in division 1st overall	Won quarterfinal against Portage (4:0); Lost semifinal against Selkirk (4:1)
1984–85	48	24	24	0	0	0	254	263	46	3rd in division 6th overall	Lost quarterfinal against Winkler (4:3)
1985–86	48	21	25	2	0	0	281	285	44	4th in division 7th overall	Lost quarterfinal against Selkirk (4:1)
1986–87	47	28	19	0	0	0	300	249	56	2nd in division 3rd overall	Won quarterfinal against Portage (4:1); Lost semifinal against Selkirk (4:3)
1987–88	48	32	16	0	0	0	301	233	64	1st in division 1st overall	Won quarterfinal against Winkler (4:1); Lost semifinal against Portage (4:1)
1988–89	48	25	22	1	0	0	292	246	51	4th in division 7th overall	Won quarterfinal against Winkler (4:2); Lost semifinal against Selkirk (4:1)
1989–90	52	35	17	0	0	0	310	246	70	2nd in division 4th overall	Won quarterfinal against Selkirk (4:1); Lost semifinal against Portage (4:1)
1990–91	48	40	7	1	0	0	325	166	81	1st in division 1st overall	Won quarterfinal against Selkirk; Lost semifinal against Winkler (4:1)
1991–92	48	36	10	1	0	1	265	169	74	2nd in division 2nd overall	Lost quarterfinal against Portage (4:1)
1992–93	48	24	22	1	1	0	225	220	50	3rd in division 5th overall	Won quarterfinal against Winkler (4:3); Won semifinal against Portage (4:1); Won final against St. Boniface (4:0)
1993–94	56	27	29	0	0	0	241	266	54	3rd in division 6th overall	Won quarterfinal against Neepawa (4:2); Lost semifinal against Winkler (4:3)
1994–95	56	28	26	1	0	1	203	199	58	3rd in division 4th overall	Lost quarterfinal against Winkler (4:3)
1995–96	56	34	19	2	0	1	286	206	71	1st in division 1st overall	Won quarterfinal against Winkler (4:1); Lost semifinal against Neepawa (4:2)
1996–97	56	16	38	1	0	1	204	291	34	5th in division 9th overall	Did not qualify
1997–98	62	24	38	0	0	0	226	285	48	5th in division 8th overall	Did not qualify
1998–99	62	18	39	1	4	0	236	329	41	4th in division 9th overall	Lost quarterfinal against OCN Blizzard (4:0)
1999–00	64	32	28	0	0	4	238	238	68	3rd in division 7th overall	Won quarterfinal against Portage (4:0); Lost semifinal against OCN Blizzard (4:0)
2000–01	64	26	31	0	6	1	212	249	59	6th in division 10th overall	Did not qualify
2001–02	64	26	32	0	3	3	220	268	58	5th in division 8th overall	Did not qualify
2002–03	64	33	27	0	2	2	254	263	70	4th in division 6th overall	Lost quarterfinal against OCN Blizzard (4:0)
2003–04	64	19	36	4	5	0	208	284	47	5th in division 9th overall	Did not qualify
2004–05	63	32	25	5	1	0	228	199	70	3rd in division 5th overall	Lost quarterfinal against Neepawa (4:1)
2005–06	63	41	17	5	0	0	283	185	87	1st in division 1st overall	Won quarterfinal against Portage (4:2); Lost semifinal against OCN Blizzard (4:3)
2006–07	63	41	16	2	4	0	263	189	88	1st in division 2nd overall	Won quarterfinal against Waywayseecappo (4:3); Won semifinal against Neepawa (4:2); Lost final against Selkirk (4:1)
2007–08	62	32	28	0	2	0	241	239	66	3rd in division 7th overall	Won quarterfinal against Waywayseecappo (4:3); Lost semifinal against Portage (4:0)
2008–09	62	42	16	0	2	2	253	191	88	2nd in division 4th overall	Won quarterfinal against OCN Blizzard (4:2); Lost semifinal against Portage (4:0)
2009–10	62	50	11	0	1	0	296	169	101	1st in division 1st overall	Won quarterfinal against Neepawa (4:0); Won semifinal against Swan Valley (4:1); Won final against Winnipeg (4:0)
2010–11	62	39	20	0	3	0	249	198	81	2nd in division 3rd overall	Won quarterfinal against OCN Blizzard (4:3); Lost semifinal against Portage (4:2)
2011–12	62	41	16	0	2	3	250	196	87	1st in division 2nd overall	Lost quarterfinal against Winnipeg (4:1)
2012–13	60	47	11	0	0	2	268	151	96	1st in division 1st overall	Won quarterfinal against Waywayseecappo (4:2); Won semifinal against OCN Blizzard (4:3); Lost final against Steinbach (4:2)
2013–14	60	40	17	0	3	0	227	171	83	1st in division 3rd overall	Won quarterfinal against OCN Blizzard (4:0); Won semifinal against Virden (4:0); Lost final against Winnipeg (4:1)
2014–15	60	23	31	0	2	4	166	216	52	9th overall	Lost Survivor Series against Waywayseecappo (2:0)
2015–16	60	21	33	0	4	2	181	246	48	9th overall	Lost Survivor Series against Selkirk (2:0)
2016–17	60	17	36	0	5	2	145	221	41	10th overall	Did not qualify
2017–18	60	14	44	0	1	1	148	289	30	10th overall	Did not qualify
2018–19	60	29	25	0	3	3	186	193	64	7th overall	Lost quarterfinal against Swan Valley (4:0)
2019–20	60	31	24	0	3	2	223	213	67	7th overall	Cancelled
2020–21	6	3	3	0	0	0	26	21	6	3rd in division 7th overall	Cancelled
2021–22	54	41	12	0	1	0	221	133	83	1st in division 2nd overall	Won quarterfinal against Swan Valley (4:2); Won semifinal against Winkler (4:1); Won final against Steinbach (4:3)
2022–23	58	32	21	0	3	2	201	189	69	4th in division 7th overall	Lost quarterfinal against Swan Valley (4:2)
2023–24	58	38	17	0	2	1	206	139	79	3rd in division 6th overall	Lost quarterfinal against OCN Blizzard (4:3)
2024–25	58	37	18	0	2	1	205	150	77	1st in division 4th overall	Won quarterfinal against Waywayseecappo (4:1); Won semifinal against Portage (4:2); Lost final against Northern Manitoba (4:3)
2025–26	58	33	23	0	2	0	199	170	68	2nd in division 6th overall	Lost quarterfinal against Waywayseecappo (4:0)

Source: "Dauphin Kings hockey team [MJHL] statistics and history". hockeydb.com.

== Notable alumni ==
- Butch Goring (1969)
- Ron Low (1967–1970)
- Ron Lemieux (1968–1970, 1971–72)
- Blaine Stoughton (1968–69)
- Mike Korney (1970–1972)
- Ron Chipperfield (1969–70)
- Don Larway (1969–1972)
- Jeff McDill (1972–73, coach: 1981–1985)
- Brad Church (1992–93)
- Darcy Hordichuk (1997–98)
- Mel Angelstad (1991–92)
- Dave Hrechkosy (1969–70)
- Kirby Law (1992–93)
- Daren Millard
- Jeff Penner (2005–2007)
- Barry Trotz (1982–83)

== See also ==
- List of ice hockey teams in Manitoba
- Manitoba Junior Hockey League
- Hockey Manitoba
