= 1972–73 MJHL season =

Manitoba ice hockey season

== Champion ==
On April 1, 1973, before a capacity crowd at St. James, the Portage Terriers captured the Turnbull Memorial Trophy as MJHL Champs. On April 18, 1973, the Terriers were declared winners of the Anavet Cup after the Humboldt Broncos of the Saskatchewan Junior Hockey League withdrew from the series. On May 3, 1973, in Portage, the Terriers won the Abbott Cup advancing to the national final by defeating the Penticton Broncos of the British Columbia Hockey League. At the Winnipeg Arena on May 14, 1973, the Portage Terriers were crowned national champs defeating the Pembroke Lumber Kings of the Central Junior A Hockey League to claim the Centennial Cup.

== League notes ==
The 1973 Portage Terriers were inducted into the Manitoba Hockey Hall of Fame.

== Regular season ==
North Division	GP	W	L	T	Pts	GF	GA
Portage Terriers	48	32	16	0	64	280	187
Kenora Muskies	48	21	26	1	43	288	296
Selkirk Steelers	48	20	26	2	42	202	253
Dauphin Kings	48	18	30	0	36	201	266

South Division	GP	W	L	T	Pts	GF	GA
St. James Canadians	48	27	20	1	55	225	187
West Kildonan North Stars	48	25	23	0	50	213	228
St. Boniface Saints	48	24	24	0	48	221	225
Winnipeg Monarchs	48	23	25	0	46	261	254

== All-Star game ==
On February 3, the MJHL staged its Allstar game at Portage with the North Division whipping their South Division counterparts 3-0. Neither team was able to score in the close checking first period, the North went ahead 1-0 in the middle stanza and added two more goals in the final period. Scoring for the North were Murray Thompson, Randy Hextall, and Kelly Secord.

North Division Lineup:

- Goal: John Memryk (Portage); Ty Langton (Dauphin)
- Defence: John Hewitt (Portage); Chuck Luska (Kenora);
  George Miller(Portage); Bill Robertson (Portage)
- Centre: Charlie Simmer (Kenora); Randy Hextall (Portage);
  Milt Longworth (Selkirk); Kelly Secord (Dauphin)
- Leftwing: Carl Haney (Kenora); Grant Farncombe (Portage);
  Murray Thompson (Selkirk); Randy Penner (Portage)
- Rightwing: Murray Fadden (Kenora); Chuck Naish (Selkirk);
  Gord Williams (Selkirk); Frank Leswick (Portage)
- Muzz MacPherson, Coach (Portage); Ron Scherza, Manager (Selkirk)

South Division Lineup:

- Goal: Norm Tesluk (West Kildonan); Murray Bannerman (St. James)
- Defence: Brian Engblom (Winnipeg); Doug Mabb (St. Boniface);
  Greg Tallon (St. James); Garry Bryck (West Kildonan)
- Centre: Jeff Dunsmore (St. Boniface); George Newbury (St. James); Wayne Gogal (Winnipeg)
- Leftwing: Pat Meagher (St. Boniface); Dan Moffat (St. James); Cam Connor (St. Boniface)
- Rightwing: Joey Cyr (St. Boniface); Perry Gosselin (St. James); Mike Flock (Winnipeg)
- Forwards: George Jacobson (West Kildonan); Mark Izzard (West Kildonan)
- Ron Russell, Coach (Winnipeg); George Kosarych, Manager (St. Boniface)

== Playoffs ==
Division Semi-Finals

Kenora defeated Selkirk 4-games-to-2
West Kildonan lost St. Boniface 9-points-to-7 points (8 point series)

Divisional Finals

Portage defeated Kenora 4-games-to-none
St. James defeated St. Boniface 4-games-to-none

Turnbull Cup Championship

Portage defeated St. James 4-games-to-none

Anavet Cup Championship

Portage defeated Humboldt Broncos (SJHL) 3-games-to-2 (Humboldt refuses to finish series)

Abbott Cup Championship

Portage defeated Penticton Broncos (BCHL) 4-games-to-3

Centennial Cup Championship

Portage defeated Pembroke Lumber Kings (CJHL) 4-games-to-1

== Awards ==
Trophy	Winner	Team
MVP	Brian Engblom	Winnipeg Monarchs
Top Goaltender (tie)	Murray Bannerman	St. James Canadians
Top Goaltender (tie)	John Memryk	Portage Terriers
Rookie of the Year		
Hockey Ability & Sportsmanship Award	George Newbury	St. James Canadians
Scoring Champion	Charlie Simmer	Kenora Muskies
Most Goals	Carl Haney	Kenora Muskies
Coach of the Year		

== All-Star teams ==
First All-Star Team
Defence	Chuck Luksa	Kenora Muskies
Left Wing	Charlie Simmer	Kenora Muskies
Second All-Star Team
Goaltender	Murray Bannerman	St. James Canadians
