= 1955–56 MJHL season =

Manitoba ice hockey season

== League notes ==
MJHL announced that each team will play six interlocking games against teams in the TBJHL as part of the regular season.

== Regular season ==
League Standings	GP	W	L	T	Pts	GF	GA
Winnipeg Monarchs	24	16	6	2	34	153	108
St. Boniface Canadiens	23	15	7	1	31	175	114
Winnipeg Barons	23	2	20	1	5	94	200

== Playoffs ==
Turnbull Cup Championship

Monarchs lost to St. Boniface 4-games-to-none

Western Memorial Cup Semi-Final

St. Boniface lost to Port Arthur North Stars (TBJHL) 4-games-to-2

== Awards ==
Trophy	Winner	Team
Top Goaltender		
Scoring Champion	Ray Brunel	St. Boniface Canadiens
