= 2020 Centennial Cup =

Ice hockey national championship

Tournament details
- Venue(s): Stride Place in Portage la Prairie, Manitoba
- Dates: May 9–17, 2020
- Host team: Portage Terriers

The 2020 Centennial Cup was to be the 50th Canadian junior A ice hockey national championship for the Canadian Junior Hockey League (CJHL) and the 50th consecutive year the national championship was awarded to this skill level since the breakaway of Major Junior hockey in 1970. The tournament was scheduled to be played at Stride Place in Portage la Prairie, Manitoba from May 9 to 17, 2020.

Hockey Canada and the CJHL elected to hold the tournament in Manitoba in honour of the 50th season of the Junior A championship, originally called the Manitoba Centennial Cup. The city of Portage la Prairie and Portage Terriers previously hosted the 2015 national championship, then known as the RBC Cup.

The 2020 Centennial Cup, regional championships, and member league playoffs were cancelled on March 12, 2020, due to the COVID-19 pandemic.

== See also ==
- 2015 Royal Bank Cup
- Impact of the COVID-19 pandemic on sports
