= 1971–72 MJHL season =

Manitoba ice hockey season

The 1971-1972 Manitoba Junior Hockey League season was won by the Dauphin Kings. Their rivals from the previous year, the St. Boniface Saints, did not proceed beyond the division semifinals.

== Champion ==
On March 28, 1972, at home in Dauphin, the Kings rule the roost for the third time in four years, capturing their third Turnbull Memorial Trophy as MJHL Champs.

== League notes ==
The Dauphin Kings established a MJHL record of 40 Wins in a season.

== Regular season ==
North Division	GP	W	L	T	Pts	GF	GA
Dauphin Kings	48	40	8	0	80	304	171
Portage Terriers	48	33	14	1	67	266	193
Kenora Muskies	47	25	22	0	50	230	223
Selkirk Steelers	48	13	34	1	27	211	278

South Division	GP	W	L	T	Pts	GF	GA
St. James Canadians	48	31	16	1	63	256	191
St. Boniface Saints	48	22	24	2	46	200	214
West Kildonan North Stars	47	15	32	0	30	208	284
Winnipeg Monarchs	48	9	38	1	19	163	284

== All-Star game ==
On February 1, the MJHL All-Stars played Toronto Marlboros of the Ontario Hockey League at the Winnipeg Arena. The Marlies led by Steve Shutt's 2 goals edged the All-Stars 8–7. Other Marlies goals were scored by Dave Gardner, Billy Harris, George Ferguson, Dennis Maruk, Tom Thomson, and Kevin Devine. Replying for the All-Stars were Rick Blight with a pair, Don Larway, Steve Craft, Brad Carefoot, Murray Fadden, and Kim Murphy added singles.

MJHL Lineup:

- Goal: Sandy Kuby (St. James); Rick St. Croix (Kenora)
- Defence: Drew Trapp (Dauphin); Mike Korney (Dauphin); Steve Craft (St. Boniface);
  Perry Miller (West Kildonan); Manley Dubroy (Kenora); Greg Tallon (St. James)
- Centre: Kim Murphy (Kenora); Jim Miller (Dauphin);
  Gary Hanson (St. James); Ed Tkachyk (Dauphin)
- Leftwing: Lothar Jochimski (Kenora); Grant Farncombe (Portage Terriers);
  Dave Marin (Dauphin); Harry Bell (Portage)
- Rightwing: Brad Carefoot (Dauphin); Don Larway (Dauphin);
  Murray Fadden (Kenora); Rick Blight (Portage)
- Coaches: Laurie Langrell (St. James); Steve Hawrysh (Dauphin)

== Playoffs ==
Division Semi-Finals

Dauphin defeated Selkirk 4-games-to-none
Portage defeated Kenora 4-games-to-1
St. James defeated Winnipeg 4-games-to-2
St. Boniface Saints lost to West Kildonan 4-games-to-1

Divisional Finals

Dauphin defeated Portage 4-games-to-none
St. James lost to West Kildonan 4-games-to-1

Turnbull Cup Championship

Dauphin defeated West Kildonan 4-games-to-none

Anavet Cup Championship

Dauphin Kings lost to Humboldt Broncos (SJHL) 4-games-to-2

== Awards ==
Trophy	Winner	Team
MVP		
Top Goaltender		
Rookie of the Year	Calvin Kitching	St. James Canadians
Hockey Ability & Sportsmanship Award		
Scoring Champion	Kim Murphy	Kenora Muskies
Most Goals	Kim Murphy	Kenora Muskies
Coach of the Year		
