= 1969–70 MJHL season =

Manitoba ice hockey season

== Champion ==
On March 22, 1970, in Dauphin, the Kings won their second consecutive MJHL title, capturing the Turnbull Memorial Trophy. The Kings completed a successful defense of the trophy by virtue of a 2–1 victory giving them a four-game sweep over the St. James Canadians.

== Regular season ==
North Division	GP	W	L	T	Pts	GF	GA
Dauphin Kings	34	22	7	5	49	195	130
Kenora Muskies	34	20	13	1	41	192	148
Portage Terriers	34	12	20	2	26	127	156
Selkirk Steelers	34	9	18	7	25	155	215

South Division	GP	W	L	T	Pts	GF	GA
Winnipeg Monarchs	34	17	12	5	39	136	120
St. James Canadians	34	16	12	6	38	146	136
West Kildonan North Stars	34	12	18	4	28	143	165
St. Boniface Saints	34	11	19	4	26	152	176

== Playoffs ==
Divisional Semi-Finals

Kenora defeated Portage 4-games-to-2
St. James defeated West Kildonan 4-games-to-2

Divisional Finals

Dauphin defeated Kenora 4-games-to-1
Winnipeg lost to St. James 4-games-to-3

Turnbull Cup Championship

Dauphin defeated St. James 4-games-to-none

Western Memorial Cup Semi-Final

Dauphin lost to Westfort Hurricanes (TBJHL) 4-games-to-2

== Awards ==
Trophy	Winner	Team
MVP		
Top Goaltender	Frank Turnbull	Winnipeg Monarchs
Rookie of the Year	Frank Turnbull	Winnipeg Monarchs
Hockey Ability & Sportsmanship Award		
Scoring Champion	Ken George	Kenora Muskies
