= 1970–71 MJHL season =

Manitoba ice hockey season

In the 1970–71 season of Canadian ice hockey, the Manitoba Junior Hockey League (MJHL) champions were Winnipeg Saints (St. Boniface Saints), who won the Turnbull Memorial Trophy in the final on March 30, 1971, at home in St. Boniface. The Saints went on to win the Anavet Cup by defeating the Weyburn Red Wings of the Saskatchewan Junior Hockey League on April 13, 1971, at the St. James ground in Winnipeg.

== Regular season ==
North Division	GP	W	L	T	Pts	GF	GA
Kenora Muskies	48	29	16	3	61	228	179
Portage Terriers	48	27	15	6	60	163	158
Dauphin Kings	48	28	17	3	59	224	185
Selkirk Steelers	48	8	34	6	22	142	241

South Division	GP	W	L	T	Pts	GF	GA
West Kildonan North Stars	48	21	19	8	50	210	211
St. James Canadians	48	21	22	5	47	160	184
St. Boniface Saints	48	19	22	7	45	208	195
Winnipeg Monarchs	48	16	24	8	40	210	221

== Playoffs ==
Divisional Semi-Finals

Kenora defeated Dauphin 4-games-to-3
Portage lost to Selkirk 4-games-to-2
West Kildonan lost to St. Boniface 4-games-to-3
St. James defeated Winnipeg 4-games-to-2

Divisional Finals

Kenora defeated Selkirk 4-games-to-1
St. James lost to St. Boniface 4-games-to-none

Turnbull Cup Championship

Kenora lost to St. Boniface 4-games-to-none

Anavet Cup Championship

St. Boniface defeated Weyburn Red Wings (SJHL) 4-games-to-2

Abbott Cup Championship

St. Boniface lost to Red Deer Rustlers (AJHL) 4-games-to-none

== Awards ==
Trophy	Winner	Team
MVP		
Top Goaltender		
Rookie of the Year	Bill Kriski	St. Boniface Saints
Hockey Ability & Sportsmanship Award		
Scoring Champion	Dan Tremblay	Dauphin Kings
Most Goals	Ken George	Kenora Muskies
Coach of the Year		

== All-Star teams ==
1971 First All-Star Team
Goaltender	Curt Ridley	Portage Terriers
