= Winnipeg Monarchs (WHL) =

Canadian junior ice hockey team

- City: Winnipeg, Manitoba
- League: Western Hockey League
- Operated: 1967–77
- Home arena: Winnipeg Arena
- Colours: Red and white

Franchise history
- 1967–1973: Winnipeg Jets
- 1973–1976: Winnipeg Clubs
- 1976–1977: Winnipeg Monarchs
- 1977–1987: Calgary Wranglers
- 1987–Present: Lethbridge Hurricanes

The Winnipeg Monarchs were a junior ice hockey team that played in the Western Canada Hockey League from 1967 to 1977 under three names. The team played as the Winnipeg Jets from 1967 to 1973; the Winnipeg Clubs from 1973 to 1976, and the Winnipeg Monarchs from 1976 to 1977. The Monarchs franchise played at Winnipeg Arena in Winnipeg, Manitoba. The team was the direct namesake for the Winnipeg Jets professional hockey club that began play in 1972; the junior Jets changed their name to disambiguate themselves in 1973.

In 1977 the Monarchs moved to Calgary to become the Calgary Wranglers. They are today the Lethbridge Hurricanes.

== Season-by-season record ==
Note: GP = Games played, W = Wins, L = Losses, T = Ties, Pts = Points, GF = Goals for, GA = Goals against

| Season | GP | W | L | T | Pts | GF | GA | Finish | Playoffs |
|---|---|---|---|---|---|---|---|---|---|
| 1967–68 | 60 | 27 | 26 | 7 | 61 | 276 | 362 | 6th overall | Lost quarter-final |
| 1968–69 | 60 | 29 | 31 | 0 | 58 | 290 | 268 | 3rd East | Lost quarter-final |
| 1969–70 | 60 | 25 | 33 | 2 | 52 | 226 | 235 | 3rd East | Lost semi-final |
| 1970–71 | 66 | 31 | 32 | 3 | 65 | 278 | 269 | 3rd East | Lost semi-final |
| 1971–72 | 68 | 24 | 43 | 1 | 49 | 238 | 273 | 6th East | Did not qualify |
| 1972–73 | 68 | 16 | 42 | 10 | 42 | 288 | 372 | 6th East | Did not qualify |
| 1973–74 | 68 | 23 | 38 | 7 | 53 | 258 | 338 | 6th East | Did not qualify |
| 1974–75 | 70 | 23 | 35 | 12 | 58 | 265 | 366 | 5th East | Did not qualify |
| 1975–76 | 72 | 27 | 39 | 6 | 60 | 302 | 378 | 4th East | Lost quarter-final |
| 1976–77 | 72 | 31 | 34 | 7 | 69 | 341 | 384 | 2nd Central | Lost quarter-final |

== See also ==
- List of ice hockey teams in Manitoba
- Lethbridge Hurricanes
