= List of Toronto Maple Leafs players =

This is a list of players who have played at least one game for the Toronto Maple Leafs, Toronto Arenas, and Toronto St. Patricks of the National Hockey League (NHL). It does not include players from the Toronto Blueshirts of the National Hockey Association (NHA). Players currently playing with the Maple Leafs (or currently playing with their AHL farm club, the Toronto Marlies, after playing at least one game with the parent club) are in bold.

== Key ==
- * Appeared in a Maple Leafs game during the 2025–2026 season.
- † Hockey Hall of Famer or member of a Stanley Cup Champion team.

Abbreviations
GP	Games played
Ret	Retired jersey
SC	Stanley Cup Champion

Goaltenders
W	Wins
SO	Shutouts
L	Losses
GAA	Goals against average
T	Ties
OTL ^{a}	Overtime losses
SV%	Save percentage

Skaters
Pos	Position	RW	Right wing	A	Assists
D	Defenseman	C	Center	P	Points
LW	Left wing	G	Goals	PIM	Penalty minutes

The "Seasons" column lists the first year of the season of the player's first game and the last year of the season of the player's last game. For example, a player who played one game in the 2000–2001 season would be listed as playing with the team from 2000–2001, regardless of what calendar year the game occurred within.

Statistics include only those accumulated while playing with Toronto.

Statistics complete as of the 2025–2026 NHL season.

== Goaltenders ==
Goalie	Nationality	Seasons	Regular season								Playoffs						Notes
Goalie	Nationality	Seasons	GP	W	L	T	OTL	SO	GAA	SV%	GP	W	L	SO	GAA	SV%	Notes
**Akhtyamov, Artur***	Russia	2025–2026	3	0	2	–	0	0	5.24	.864	–	–	–	–	–	–	
Alexander, Jett	Canada	2022–2023	1	0	0	–	0	0	0.00	.000	–	–	–	–	–	–	
Andersen, Frederik	Denmark	2016–2021	268	149	74	–	36	13	2.79	.914	25	10	14	1	2.78	.916	
Aubin, Jean-Sebastien	Canada	2005–2007	31	12	5	–	4	1	2.88	.899	–	–	–	–	–	–	
Barrasso, Tom	United States	2001–2002	4	2	2	0	–	0	2.74	.909	–	–	–	–	–	–	
Bastien, Baz	Canada	1945–1946	5	0	4	1	–	0	4.00	–	–	–	–	–	–	–	
Beaupre, Don	Canada	1995–1997	11	0	8	0	–	0	4.84	.843	–	–	–	–	–	–	
Belfour, Ed†	Canada	2002–2006	170	93	61	11	4	17	2.51	.912	20	9	11	3	2.40	.922	HHoF 2011
Bell, Gord	Canada	1945–1946	8	3	5	0	–	0	3.87	–	–	–	–	–	–	–	
Bernier, Jonathan	Canada	2013–2016	151	59	68	–	17	6	2.80	.915	–	–	–	–	–	–	
Bernhardt, Tim	Canada	1984–1987	61	17	31	7	–	0	4.26	.866	–	–	–	–	–	–	
Bester, Allan	Canada	1983–1991	205	69	91	16	–	7	4.06	.882	10	2	6	0	3.60	.889	
Bibeau, Antoine	Canada	2016–2017	2	1	1	–	0	0	1.98	.927	–	–	–	–	–	–	
Bibeault, Paul	Canada	1943–1944	29	13	14	2	–	5	3.00	–	5	1	4	0	3.44	–	
Bower, Johnny†	Canada	1958–1970	475	219	160	79	_	32	2.72	_	74	35	29	5	2.68	_	HHoF 1976; SC 1962, 1963, 1964, 1967
Broda, Turk†	Canada	1936–1952	609	302	224	102	_	61	2.53	_	101	60	39	13	1.98	_	HHoF 1967; SC 1942, 1947, 1948, 1949, 1951
Campbell, Jack	United States	2019–2022	77	51	14	–	9	7	2.50	.916	14	6	8	2	2.45	.915	
Centomo, Sebastien	Canada	2001–2002	1	0	0	0	–	0	4.50	.750	–	–	–	–	–	–	
Chabot, Lorne†	Canada	1928–1933	215	103	79	31	–	31	2.17	–	22	11	9	2	1.65	–	SC 1932
Chadwick, Ed	Canada	1955–1960	180	57	89	34	–	14	2.88	–	–	–	–	–	–	–	
Cheevers, Gerry†	Canada	1961–1962	2	1	1	0	–	0	3.00	–	–	–	–	–	–	–	HHoF 1985
Clemmensen, Scott	United States	2007–2008	3	1	1	–	0	0	3.90	.839	–	–	–	–	–	–	
Cousineau, Marcel	Canada	1996–1998	15	3	5	1	–	1	3.19	.905	–	–	–	–	–	–	
Crha, Jiri	Czechoslovakia	1979–1981	69	28	27	11	–	0	3.97	–	5	0	4	0	6.77	–	
Dowie, Bruce	Canada	1983–1984	2	0	1	0	–	0	3.33	.907	–	–	–	–	–	–	
Edwards, Don	Canada	1985–1986	38	12	23	0	–	0	4.78	.860	–	–	–	–	–	–	
Edwards, Marv	Canada	1969–1970	25	10	9	4	–	1	3.25	–	–	–	–	–	–	–	
Enroth, Jhonas	Sweden	2016–2017	6	0	3	–	1	0	3.94	.872	–	–	–	–	–	–	
Favell, Doug	Canada	1973–1976	74	26	26	16	–	1	3.54	.888	3	0	3	0	3.34	.912	
Forbes, Vernon	Canada	1919–1921	25	15	10	0	–	0	3.91	–	2	0	2	0	3.50	–	
Fuhr, Grant†	Canada	1991–1993	95	38	42	9	–	3	3.50	.885	–	–	–	–	–	–	HHoF 2003
Gamble, Bruce	Canada	1965–1971	210	83	84	31	–	19	2.95	.914	3	0	2	0	9.08	.803	
Gerber, Martin	Switzerland	2008–2009	12	6	5	–	0	0	3.23	.905	–	–	–	–	–	–	
Giguere, Jean-Sebastien	Canada	2009–2011	48	17	18	–	6	2	2.73	.906	–	–	–	–	–	–	
Grant, Benny	Canada	1928–1930; 1930–1932; 1943–1944	39	13	18	4	–	3	3.62	–	–	–	–	–	–	–	
Gustavsson, Jonas	Sweden	2009–2012	107	39	45	–	15	5	2.98	.900	–	–	–	–	–	–	
Hainsworth, George†	Canada	1933–1937	147	79	48	20	–	19	2.26	–	21	9	12	2	2.25	–	HHoF 1961
Hamel, Pierre	Canada	1974–1979	5	1	2	0	–	0	5.51	–	–	–	–	–	–	–	
Harrison, Paul	Canada	1978–1980	55	17	29	5	–	1	3.98	–	3	0	1	0	3.06	–	
Healy, Glenn	Canada	1997–2001	65	23	30	5	–	2	2.91	.887	1	0	0	0	0.00	1.000	
Hebert, Sammy	Canada	1917–1918	2	1	0	0	–	0	7.50	–	–	–	–	–	–	–	
**Hildeby, Dennis***	Sweden	2024–2026	26	8	10	–	4	1	2.98	.903	–	–	–	–	–	–	
Holmes, Harry†	Canada	1917–1919	18	9	9	0	–	0	4.70	–	2	1	1	0	3.50	–	HHoF 1972; SC 1918
Hutchinson, Michael	Canada	2018–2022	30	10	15	–	2	3	3.18	.898	–	–	–	–	–	–	
Ing, Peter	Canada	1989–1991	59	16	31	9	–	1	3.95	.880	–	–	–	–	–	–	
Ironstone, Joe	Canada	1927–1928	1	0	0	1	–	1	0.00	–	–	–	–	–	–	–	
Johnston, Eddie	Canada	1973–1974	26	12	9	4	–	1	3.09	–	1	0	1	0	6.00	–	
Jones, Martin	Canada	2023–2024	22	11	8	–	1	2	2.87	.902	–	–	–	–	–	–	
Joseph, Curtis	Canada	1998–2002; 2008–2009	270	138	97	27	1	17	2.49	.910	60	32	28	8	2.22	.920	
Kidd, Trevor	Canada	2002–2004	34	12	15	4	–	1	3.17	.888	1	0	0	0	1.82	.909	
Kallgren, Erik	Sweden	2021–2023	24	11	6	–	5	1	3.04	.892	1	0	0	0	0.00	1.000	
Kaskisuo, Kasimir	Finland	2019–2020	1	0	1	–	0	0	6.00	.842	–	–	–	–	–	–	
Laforest, Mark	Canada	1989–1990	27	9	14	0	–	0	3.89	.886	–	–	–	–	–	–	
Larocque, Michel	Canada	1980–1983	74	16	35	13	–	0	4.80	.859	2	0	1	0	6.36	.750	
Lindsay, Bert	Canada	1918–1919	16	5	11	0	–	0	4.99	–	–	–	–	–	–	–	
Lockhart, Howard	Canada	1919–1920; 1923–1924	8	4	3	0	–	0	4.86	–	–	–	–	–	–	–	
Low, Ron	Canada	1972–1973	42	12	24	4	–	1	3.89	–	–	–	–	–	–	–	
Lumley, Harry†	Canada	1952–1956	267	103	106	58	–	34	2.20	–	14	2	12	1	2.96	–	HHoF 1980
MacDonald, Joey	Canada	2009–2010	6	1	4	0	–	0	3.20	.892	–	–	–	–	–	–	
MacIntyre, Drew	Canada	2013–2014	2	0	1	–	0	0	2.54	.922	–	–	–	–	–	–	
Maniago, Cesare	Canada	1960–1961	7	4	2	1	–	0	2.43	–	2	1	1	0	2.48	–	
Marois, Jean	Canada	1943–1944	1	1	0	0	–	0	4.00	–	–	–	–	–	–	–	
Mayer, Gil	Canada	1949–1956	9	2	6	1	–	0	2.67	–	–	–	–	–	–	–	
McCool, Frank	Canada	1944–1946	72	34	31	7	–	4	3.36	–	13	8	5	4	2.23	–	
McElhinney, Curtis	Canada	2016–2018	32	17	12	–	1	4	2.45	.925	1	0	1	0	5.07	.826	
McLachlan, Murray	Canada	1970–1971	2	0	1	0	–	0	9.60	–	–	–	–	–	–	–	
McNamara, Gerry	Canada	1960–1961; 1969–1970	7	2	2	1	–	0	2.60	–	–	–	–	–	–	–	
McRae, Gord	Canada	1972–1978	71	30	22	10	–	1	3.49	–	8	2	5	0	2.91	–	
Mitchell, Ivan	Canada	1919–1922	22	10	9	0	–	0	4.44	–	–	–	–	–	–	–	
Mrazek, Petr	Czech Republic	2021–2022	20	12	6	–	0	0	3.34	.888	–	–	–	–	–	–	
Murray, Matt	Canada	2022–2025	28	15	9	–	2	1	3.05	.901	1	0	0	0	4.41	.857	
Palmateer, Mike	Canada	1976–1980	296	129	112	41	–	15	3.43	.849	29	12	17	2	3.03	–	
Parent, Bernie	Canada	1970–1972	65	24	25	12	–	3	3.67	–	8	3	5	0	2.76	–	HHoF 1984
Parent, Bob	Canada	1981–1983	3	0	2	0	–	0	5.63	–	–	–	–	–	–	–	
Pickard, Calvin	Canada	2017–2018	1	0	0	–	1	0	3.83	.857	–	–	–	–	–	–	
Plante, Jacques†	Canada	1970–1973	106	48	38	15	–	7	2.46	–	4	0	3	0	4.07	–	HHoF 1978
Pogge, Justin	Canada	2008–2009	7	1	4	–	1	0	4.35	.844	–	–	–	–	–	–	
Potvin, Félix	Canada	1991–1999	369	160	149	49	–	12	2.87	.908	52	25	27	5	2.85	.910	
**Primeau, Cayden***	United States	2025–2026	3	2	1	–	0	0	4.30	.838	–	–	–	–	–	–	
Puppa, Daren	Canada	1992–1993	8	6	2	0	–	2	2.25	.922	1	0	0	0	3.00	.857	
Raycroft, Andrew	Canada	2006–2008	91	39	34	–	14	3	3.17	.890	–	–	–	–	–	–	
Reese, Jeff	Canada	1987–1992; 1998–1999	76	20	33	9	–	2	4.09	.871	2	1	1	0	3.33	.880	
Reimer, James	Canada	2010–2016	207	85	76	–	23	11	2.83	.914	7	3	4	0	2.88	.923	
Rhodes, Damian	United States	1990–1996	47	20	18	5	–	0	2.64	.908	1	0	0	0	0.00	0.000	
Ridley, Curt	Canada	1979–1981	6	1	2	0	–	0	5.13	–	–	–	–	–	–	–	
Rittich, David	Czech Republic	2020–2021	4	1	1	–	1	0	2.72	.888	–	–	–	–	–	–	
Roach, John†	Canada	1921–1928	222	98	107	17	–	13	2.80	–	4	1	2	1	2.25	–	SC 1922
Rollins, Al†	Canada	1949–1952	112	57	30	24	–	11	2.06	–	6	3	3	0	2.36	–	SC 1951
Rutherford, Jim	Canada	1980–1981	18	4	10	2	–	0	5.12	–	–	–	–	–	–	–	
Rynnas, Jussi	Finland	2011–2013	3	1	0	–	1	0	3.85	.848	–	–	–	–	–	–	
Samsonov, Ilya	Russia	2022–2024	82	50	17	–	13	7	2.71	.905	14	5	8	0	3.09	.897	
Sawchuk, Terry†	Canada	1964–1967	91	42	29	13	–	4	2.81	–	13	6	6	0	2.88	–	HHoF 1971; SC 1967
Schwab, Corey	Canada	2001–2002	30	12	10	5	–	1	2.73	.894	1	0	0	0	0.00	1.000	
Scrivens, Ben	Canada	2011–2013	32	11	14	–	2	2	2.86	.910	–	–	–	–	–	–	
Simmons, Don†	Canada	1961–1964	58	29	20	7	–	5	2.69	–	3	2	1	0	2.91	–	SC 1962, 1963, 1964
Smith, Al	Canada	1965–1969	10	3	3	1	–	0	3.02	–	–	–	–	–	–	–	
Smith, Gary	Canada	1965–1967	5	0	4	0	–	0	3.61	–	–	–	–	–	–	–	
Sparks, Garret	United States	2015–2017; 2018–2019	37	14	18	–	2	2	3.09	.898	–	–	–	–	–	–	
St. Croix, Rick	Canada	1982–1985	48	11	28	2	–	0	4.63	.841	1	0	0	0	60.00	–	
Stein, Phil	Canada	1939–1940	1	0	0	1	–	0	1.71	–	–	–	–	–	–	–	
**Stolarz, Anthony***	United States	2024–2026	60	31	18	–	6	4	2.61	.912	7	4	2	0	2.19	.901	
Tellqvist, Mikael	Sweden	2002–2007	40	16	16	2	2	2	3.01	.895	–	–	–	–	–	–	
Thomas, Wayne	Canada	1975–1977	97	38	37	18	–	3	3.41	–	14	6	7	1	3.53	–	
Tremblay, Vincent	Canada	1979–1983	54	12	22	8	–	1	4.69	–	–	–	–	–	–	–	
Toskala, Vesa	Finland	2007–2010	145	62	54	–	20	5	3.08	.894	–	–	–	–	–	–	
Wamsley, Rick	Canada	1991–1993	11	4	6	0	–	0	4.29	.864	–	–	–	–	–	–	
Wregget, Ken	Canada	1983–1989	200	55	112	17	–	2	4.34	.871	25	13	11	2	3.85	.882	
Wilson, Dunc	Canada	1973–1975	49	17	22	7	–	1	3.29	–	–	–	–	–	–	–	
Wilson, Ross	Canada	1955–1956	1	0	0	0	–	0	0.00	–	–	–	–	–	–	–	
**Woll, Joseph***	United States	2021–2026	117	63	43	–	9	4	2.94	.906	14	6	6	1	2.73	.906	

== Skaters ==
Skater	Nat	Pos	Seasons	Regular season					Playoffs					Notes
Skater	Nat	Pos	Seasons	GP	G	A	P	PIM	GP	G	A	P	PIM	Notes
Abbott, Spencer	Canada	LW	2013–2014	1	0	0	0	0	—	—	—	—	—	
Aberg, Pontus	Sweden	LW	2019–2020	5	0	1	1	0	—	—	—	—	—	
Abruzzese, Nicholas	United States	C	2021–2023	11	1	2	3	2	—	—	—	—	—	
Acciari, Noel	United States	C	2022–2023	23	4	1	5	11	11	2	0	2	2	
Acomb, Doug	Canada	C	1969–1970	2	0	1	1	0	—	—	—	—	—	
Adam, Russ	Canada	C	1982–1983	8	1	2	3	11	—	—	—	—	—	
Adams, Jack†	Canada	C	1917–1926	133	78	31	109	300	4	2	0	2	13	SC 1918; HHoF 1959
Adams, Kevyn	United States	C	1997–2000	58	5	8	13	46	19	1	2	3	21	
Adams, Stewart	Canada	LW	1932–1933	8	0	2	2	0	—	—	—	—	—	
Agostino, Kenny	United States	LW	2020–2021	1	0	0	0	0	—	—	—	—	—	
Aldcorn, Gary	Canada	LW	1956–1959	86	15	18	33	18	—	—	—	—	—	
Alexander, Claire	Canada	D	1974–1977	123	10	29	39	30	16	2	4	6	4	
Allison, Jason	Canada	C	2005–2006	66	17	43	60	76	—	—	—	—	—	
Allison, Mike	Canada	LW	1986–1988	86	7	19	26	76	13	3	5	8	15	
Amadio, Michael	Canada	C	2021–2022	3	0	0	0	0	—	—	—	—	—	
Anderson, Glenn†	Canada	RW	1991–1994	221	63	94	157	267	21	7	11	18	31	HHoF 2008
Anderson, Joey	United States	RW	2020–2023	20	2	1	3	2	—	—	—	—	—	
Anderson, John	Canada	RW	1977–1985	534	189	204	393	168	17	3	7	10	0	
Andrews, Lloyd†	Canada	LW	1921–1925	53	8	5	13	10	2	0	0	0	0	SC 1922
Andreychuk, Dave	Canada	LW	1992–1996	223	120	99	219	194	46	20	12	32	76	
Andrusak, Greg	Canada	D	1999–2000	9	0	1	1	4	3	0	0	0	2	
Antropov, Nik	Kazakhstan	C	1999–2009	509	125	166	291	477	28	2	3	5	34	
Apps, Syl†	Canada	C	1936–1948	423	201	231	432	56	69	25	29	54	8	HHoF 1961; SC 1942, 1947, 1948
Arbour, Al†	Canada	D	1961–1966	66	2	7	9	74	10	0	0	0	8	HHoF 1996; SC 1962, 1964
Arbour, Amos	Canada	LW	1923–1924	21	1	3	4	4	—	—	—	—	—	
Arbour, Jack	Canada	D	1928–1929	10	1	0	1	10	—	—	—	—	—	
Arcobello, Mark	United States	RW	2015–2016	20	3	1	4	0	—	—	—	—	—	
Armstrong, Colby	Canada	RW	2010–2012	79	9	17	26	47	—	—	—	—	—	
Armstrong, George†	Canada	RW	1949–1971	1,187	296	417	713	721	110	26	34	60	52	HHoF 1975; SC 1962–1964, 1967
Armstrong, Murray	Canada	C	1937–1939	12	0	1	1	0	3	0	0	0	0	
Armstrong, Norm	Canada	RW/D	1962–1963	7	1	1	2	2	—	—	—	—	—	
Armstrong, Tim	Canada	C	1988–1989	11	1	0	1	6	—	—	—	—	—	
Arundel, John	Canada	D	1949–1950	3	0	0	0	9	—	—	—	—	—	
Ashby, Don	Canada	C	1975–1979	141	26	40	66	34	9	1	0	1	4	
Ashton, Carter	Canada	RW	2011–2015	54	0	3	3	32	—	—	—	—	—	
Aston-Reese, Zach	United States	C	2022–2023	77	10	4	14	25	6	1	0	1	0	
Aube-Kubel, Nicolas	Canada	RW	2022–2023	6	0	0	0	4	—	—	—	—	—	
Aubin, Norm	Canada	C	1981–1983	69	18	13	31	30	1	0	0	0	0	
Aulie, Keith	Canada	D	2010–2012	57	2	2	4	48	—	—	—	—	—	
Augusta, Patrik	Czech Republic	RW	1993–1994	2	0	0	0	0	—	—	—	—	—	
Backor, Pete	Canada	D	1944–1945	36	4	5	9	6	—	—	—	—	—	
Bailey, Ace†	Canada	RW	1926–1934	313	111	82	193	472	21	3	4	7	12	HHoF 1975; SC 1932
Bailey, Bob	Canada	RW	1953–1956	86	6	9	15	128	6	0	2	2	4	
Bailey, Casey	United States	RW	2014–2015	6	1	0	1	2	—	—	—	—	—	
Bailey, Reid	Canada	D	1982–1983	1	0	0	0	2	—	—	—	—	—	
Baker, Jamie	Canada	C	1996–1998	71	8	13	21	38	—	—	—	—	—	
Baldwin, Doug	Canada	D	1945–1946	15	0	1	1	6	—	—	—	—	—	
Balfour, Earl	Canada	LW	1951–1958	80	14	6	20	48	4	0	1	1	2	
Barabanov, Alexander	Russia	F	2020–2021	13	0	1	1	4	—	—	—	—	—	
Barbe, Andy	Canada	RW	1950–1951	1	0	0	0	2	—	—	—	—	—	
Barilko, Bill†	Canada	D	1946–1951	252	26	36	62	456	47	5	7	12	104	SC 1947—1949, 1951
Barrie, Tyson	Canada	D	2019–2020	70	5	34	39	16	5	0	0	0	2	
Bathgate, Andy†	Canada	RW	1963–1965	70	19	44	63	42	20	6	4	10	31	SC 1964; HHoF 1978
Battaglia, Bates	United States	LW	2006–2008	95	12	19	31	52	—	—	—	—	—	
Baumgartner, Ken	Canada	LW	1991–1996	200	7	7	14	520	17	1	0	1	18	
Baun, Bob†	Canada	D	1956–1967; 1970–1973	739	29	140	169	1,155	92	3	12	15	165	SC 1962—1964, 1967
Beauchemin, Francois	Canada	D	2009–2011	136	7	31	38	49	—	—	—	—	—	
Belak, Wade	Canada	RW	2000–2008	318	7	17	24	763	22	1	0	1	36	
Belanger, Alain	Canada	RW	1977–1978	9	0	1	1	6	—	—	—	—	—	
Belanger, Ken	Canada	LW	1994–1995	3	0	0	0	9	—	—	—	—	—	
Bell, Brendan	Canada	D	2005–2007	32	1	4	5	19	—	—	—	—	—	
Bell, Mark	Canada	C	2007–2008	35	4	6	10	60	—	—	—	—	—	
Bellefeuille, Pete	Canada	RW	1925–1927	49	14	2	16	34	—	—	—	—	—	
Benn, Jordie	Canada	D	2022–2023	12	1	1	2	12	—	—	—	—	—	
Benning, Jim	Canada	D	1981–1987	364	37	136	173	289	4	1	1	2	2	
**Benning, Matt***	Canada	D	2025–2026	1	0	0	0	0	—	—	—	—	—	
**Benoit, Simon***	Canada	D	2023–2026	215	2	19	21	156	20	1	1	2	14	
Bentley, Max†	Canada	C	1948–1953	354	122	134	256	132	40	14	24	38	8	SC 1948, 1949, 1951; HHoF 1966
Berard, Bryan	United States	D	1998–2000	102	8	41	49	64	17	1	8	9	8	
Berehowsky, Drake	Canada	D	1990–1995; 2003–2004	133	7	28	35	181	—	—	—	—	—	
Berezin, Sergei	Russia	LW	1996–2001	357	126	94	220	34	40	12	15	27	6	
Berg, Aki	Finland	D	2000–2006	325	10	32	42	172	48	1	4	5	45	
Berg, Bill	Canada	LW	1992–1996	196	21	21	42	206	46	2	4	6	32	
Berube, Craig	Canada	LW	1991–1992	40	5	7	12	109	—	—	—	—	—	
Bertuzzi, Tyler	Canada	LW	2023–2024	80	21	22	43	53	7	1	3	4	6	
Bialowas, Frank	Canada	LW	1993–1994	3	0	0	0	12	—	—	—	—	—	
Biega, Alex	Canada	D	2021–2022	2	0	0	0	0	—	—	—	—	—	
Bionda, Jack	Canada	D	1955–1956	13	0	1	1	18	—	—	—	—	—	
Blackwell, Colin	United States	C	2021–2022	19	2	1	3	10	7	1	1	2	0	
Blair, Andy†	Canada	C	1928–1936	358	74	83	157	290	38	6	6	12	32	SC 1932
Blair, Chuck	Canada	RW	1948–1949	1	0	0	0	0	—	—	—	—	—	
Blair, George	Canada	C	1950–1951	2	0	0	0	0	—	—	—	—	—	
**Blais, Sammy***	Canada	LW	2025–2026	8	1	2	3	4	—	—	—	—	—	
Blaisdell, Mike	Canada	RW	1987–1989	27	4	2	6	6	6	1	2	3	10	
Blake, Jason	United States	LW	2007–2010	216	50	91	141	94	—	—	—	—	—	
Blake, Mickey	Canada	LW/D	1935–1936	1	0	0	0	2	—	—	—	—	—	
Bodie, Troy	Canada	RW	2013–2015	52	3	7	10	31	—	—	—	—	—	
Bodnar, Gus†	Canada	C	1943–1947	187	48	105	153	60	19	3	1	4	4	SC 1945, 1947
Boesch, Garth	Canada	D	1946–1950	197	9	28	37	205	34	2	5	7	18	SC 1947—1949
Bogosian, Zach	United States	D	2020–2021	45	0	4	4	49	7	0	1	1	0	
Bohonos, Lonny	Canada	RW	1997–1999	13	6	3	9	8	9	3	6	9	2	
Boimistruck, Fred	Canada	D	1981–1983	83	4	14	18	45	—	—	—	—	—	
Borgman, Andreas	Sweden	D	2017–2018	48	3	8	11	28	—	—	—	—	—	
Borschevsky, Nikolai	Russia	RW	1992–1995	142	48	65	113	38	31	4	9	13	4	
Boyd, Travis	United States	C	2020–2021	20	3	5	8	2	—	—	—	—	—	
Boyes, Brad	Canada	RW	2015–2016	60	8	16	24	12	—	—	—	—	—	
Boyle, Brian	United States	C	2016–2017	21	0	3	3	18	6	0	2	2	6	
Bozak, Tyler	Canada	C	2009–2018	594	136	229	365	182	18	5	5	10	14	
Brennan, T. J.	United States	D	2014–2016	13	1	1	2	15	—	—	—	—	—	
Brewer, Carl†	Canada	D	1957–1965; 1979–1980	473	19	136	155	898	63	3	15	18	134	SC 1962, 1963, 1964
Brewer, Eric	Canada	D	2014–2015	18	2	3	5	12	—	—	—	—	—	
Brodie, T. J.	Canada	D	2020–2024	274	8	74	82	100	26	1	6	7	22	
Brooks, Adam	Canada	C	2019–2021	18	4	4	8	0	2	0	0	0	2	
Brown, Connor	Canada	RW	2015–2019	253	43	56	99	44	20	1	4	5	2	
Brown, Jeff	Canada	D	1997–1998	19	1	8	9	10	—	—	—	—	—	
Brown, Mike	United States	RW	2010–2013	112	5	8	13	213	—	—	—	—	—	
Brubaker, Jeff	United States	LW	1984–1986	89	8	4	12	276	—	—	—	—	—	
Brydge, Bill	Canada	D	1926–1927	41	6	3	9	76	—	—	—	—	—	
Brydson, Gord	Canada	C/RW	1929–1930	8	2	0	2	8	—	—	—	—	—	
Buchanan, Al	Canada	LW	1948–1950	4	0	1	1	2	—	—	—	—	—	
Bullard, Mike	Canada	C	1991–1992	65	14	14	28	40	—	—	—	—	—	
Bunting, Michael	Canada	LW	2021–2023	161	46	66	112	183	13	2	3	5	9	
Burega, Bill	Canada	D	1955–1956	4	0	1	1	4	—	—	—	—	—	
Burrows, Dave	Canada	D	1978–1981	151	5	27	32	72	9	0	2	2	9	
Butcher, Garth	Canada	D	1994–1995	45	1	7	8	59	7	0	0	0	8	
Butler, Jerry	Canada	RW	1977–1980	204	24	22	46	130	19	1	1	2	22	
Byers, Mike	Canada	RW	1967–1969	15	2	2	4	2	—	—	—	—	—	
Caffery, Jack	Canada	C	1954–1955	3	0	0	0	0	—	—	—	—	—	
Cahan, Larry	Canada	D	1954–1956	80	0	8	8	110	4	0	0	0	0	
Cain, Jim	Canada	D	1925–1926	23	0	0	0	8	—	—	—	—	—	
Cameron, Harry†	Canada	D	1917–1919; 1919–1920; 1920–1923	105	71	45	116	127	6	1	4	5	10	HHoF 1962; SC 1918, 1922
Campbell, Andrew	Canada	D	2015–2017	6	0	1	1	2	—	—	—	—	—	
Capuano, Jack	United States	D	1989–1990	1	0	0	0	0	—	—	—	—	—	
Caputi, Luca	Canada	LW	2009–2011	26	1	5	6	14	—	—	—	—	—	
Carey, George	Canada	RW	1923–1924	4	0	0	0	0	—	—	—	—	—	
Carleton, Wayne	Canada	LW	1965–1970	91	10	16	26	60	—	—	—	—	—	
**Carlo, Brandon***	United States	D	2024–2026	75	0	10	10	50	13	0	0	0	8	
Carlyle, Randy	Canada	D	1976–1978	94	2	16	18	82	16	0	2	2	28	
Carr, Lorne†	Canada	RW	1941–1946	236	105	121	226	37	37	6	7	13	11	SC 1942, 1945
Carr, Alfred	Canada	LW	1943–1944	5	0	1	1	2	—	—	—	—	—	
Carrick, Connor	United States	D	2015–2018	130	8	16	24	93	6	0	0	0	4	
Carrick, Sam	Canada	C	2014–2016	19	1	1	2	13	—	—	—	—	—	
Carriere, Larry	Canada	D	1979–1980	2	0	1	1	0	—	—	—	—	—	
Carson, Bill	Canada	C	1926–1929	96	43	18	61	122	—	—	—	—	—	
Ceci, Cody	Canada	D	2019–2020	56	1	7	8	20	5	1	0	1	4	
Ceresino, Ray	Canada	RW	1948–1949	12	1	1	2	2	—	—	—	—	—	
Chamberlain, Erwin	Canada	LW	1937–1940	131	19	45	64	146	18	2	5	7	6	
Champagne, Andre	Canada	LW	1962–1963	2	0	0	0	0	—	—	—	—	—	
Chase, Kelly	Canada	RW	1996–1997	2	0	0	0	27	—	—	—	—	—	
Chisholm, Lex	Canada	C/RW	1939–1941	54	10	8	18	19	3	1	0	1	0	
Church, Jack	Canada	D	1938–1942	72	1	10	11	116	16	1	1	2	14	
Cimetta, Rob	Canada	LW/RW	1990–1992	49	6	7	13	33	—	—	—	—	—	
Clancy, King†	Canada	D	1930–1937	286	52	78	130	383	37	6	6	12	54	HHoF 1958; SC 1932
Clancy, Terry	Canada	RW	1968–1970; 1972–1973	86	6	6	12	37	—	—	—	—	—	
Clark, Wendel	Canada	LW	1985–1994; 1995–1998; 1999–2000	608	260	181	441	1,535	79	34	17	51	185	
Clarkson, David	Canada	RW	2013–2015	118	15	11	26	185	—	—	—	—	—	
Cleghorn, Sprague†	Canada	D	1920–1921	13	3	5	8	31	1	0	0	0	0	HHoF 1958
Clifford, Kyle	Canada	LW	2019–2020; 2021–2023	41	2	5	7	56	6	0	0	0	15	
Clune, Rich	Canada	LW	2015–2016	19	0	4	4	22	—	—	—	—	—	
Colaiacovo, Carlo	Canada	D	2002–2009	111	12	21	33	57	—	—	—	—	—	
Colborne, Joe	Canada	C	2010–2013	16	1	5	6	6	2	0	0	0	0	
Collins, Gary	Canada	C	1958–1959	—	—	—	—	—	2	0	0	0	0	
Conacher, Brian	Canada	LW	1961–1968	133	25	27	52	80	12	3	2	5	21	
Conacher, Charlie†	Canada	RW	1929–1938	326	200	124	324	411	42	14	12	26	39	HHoF 1961; SC 1932
Conacher, Pete	Canada	LW	1957–1958	5	0	1	1	5	—	—	—	—	—	
Connolly, Tim	United States	C	2011–2012	70	13	23	36	40	—	—	—	—	—	
Convery, Brandon	Canada	C	1995–1997	50	7	10	17	24	5	0	0	0	2	
Cooper, David	Canada	D	1996–1998; 2000–2001	30	3	7	10	24	—	—	—	—	—	
Copp, Bob	Canada	D	1942–1943; 1950–1951	40	3	9	12	26	—	—	—	—	—	
Corbeau, Bert	Canada	D	1923–1927	131	18	19	37	338	2	0	0	0	10	
Corrado, Frank	Canada	D	2015–2017	41	1	5	6	32	—	—	—	—	—	
Corrigan, Chuck	Canada	RW	1937–1938	3	0	0	0	0	—	—	—	—	—	
Corson, Shayne	Canada	LW	2000–2003	197	27	47	74	358	32	2	7	9	49	
Costello, Les†	Canada	LW	1947–1950	15	2	3	5	11	6	2	2	4	2	SC 1948
Costello, Rich	United States	C	1983–1986	12	2	2	4	2	—	—	—	—	—	
Cotch, Charlie	Canada	LW	1924–1925	5	0	0	0	0	—	—	—	—	—	
Cote, Sylvain	Canada	D	1997–2000	94	8	31	39	34	17	2	1	3	10	
Cotton, Harold†	Canada	LW	1928–1935	285	68	88	156	252	39	2	8	10	44	SC 1932
Coughlin, John	Canada	RW	1917–1918	5	2	0	2	3	—	—	—	—	—	
Courtnall, Russ	Canada	RW	1983–1989	309	90	128	218	243	29	8	11	19	19	
**Cowan, Easton***	Canada	RW	2025–2026	66	11	18	29	45	—	—	—	—	—	
Cox, Danny	Canada	LW	1926–1930	115	22	18	40	63	4	0	1	1	4	
Crabb, Joey	United States	RW	2010–2012	115	14	27	41	57	—	—	—	—	—	
Craig, Mike	Canada	RW	1994–1997	172	20	30	50	116	8	0	1	1	20	
Craighead, John	Canada	RW	1996–1997	5	0	0	0	10	—	—	—	—	—	
Crawford, Rusty†	Canada	LW	1917–1919	26	8	6	14	102	2	2	1	3	9	SC 1918; HHoF 1971
Creighton, Dave	Canada	C	1954–1955; 1958–1960	62	6	15	21	16	5	0	1	1	0	
Cross, Cory	Canada	D	1999–2002	162	10	25	35	168	35	2	3	5	20	
Crozier, Joe	Canada	D	1959–1960	5	0	3	3	2	—	—	—	—	—	
Cullen, Barry	Canada	RW	1955–1959	164	28	43	71	88	2	0	0	0	0	
Cullen, Brian	Canada	C	1954–1959	220	37	60	97	80	19	3	0	3	2	
Cullen, John	Canada	C	1992–1994	100	26	45	71	120	15	2	3	5	0	
Curran, Brian	Canada	D	1987–1991	130	3	14	17	512	11	0	1	1	60	
Czerkawski, Mariusz	Poland	RW	2005–2006	19	4	1	5	6	—	—	—	—	—	
D'Amigo, Jerry	United States	RW	2013–2014	22	1	2	3	0	—	—	—	—	—	
Dahl, Kevin	Canada	D	1998–1999	3	0	0	0	2	—	—	—	—	—	
Dahlstrom, Carl	Sweden	D	2021–2022	3	0	2	2	2	—	—	—	—	—	
Dallman, Marty	Canada	C	1987–1989	6	0	1	1	0	—	—	—	—	—	
Damphousse, Vincent	Canada	C	1986–1991	394	118	211	329	262	23	1	8	9	20	
Daoust, Dan	Canada	C	1982–1990	518	87	166	253	540	32	7	5	12	83	
Darragh, Harold†	Canada	LW	1931–1933	67	6	12	18	6	7	0	1	1	2	SC 1932
Davidson, Bob†	Canada	LW	1934–1946	491	94	160	254	398	79	5	17	22	76	SC 1942, 1945
Davis, Kim	Canada	C	1980–1981	2	0	0	0	4	—	—	—	—	—	
Dawes, Bob†	Canada	D/C	1946–1950	17	2	2	4	2	9	0	0	0	2	SC 1949
Day, Clarence†	Canada	D	1924–1937	538	86	113	199	587	47	4	7	11	56	SC 1932; HHoF 1961
DeBlois, Lucien	Canada	C	1990–1992	92	18	23	41	69	—	—	—	—	—	
DeMarco, Ab	Canada	C	1942–1943	4	0	1	1	0	—	—	—	—	—	
DeGray, Dale	Canada	D	1987–1988	56	6	18	24	63	5	0	1	1	16	
Dempsey, Nathan	Canada	D	1996–2002	48	2	12	14	8	6	0	2	2	0	
Denneny, Corbett†	Canada	C	1917–1923; 1926–1927	135	98	41	139	130	6	1	0	1	7	SC 1918, 1922
Denoird, Gerry	Canada	C	1922–1923	17	0	1	1	0	—	—	—	—	—	
Der-Arguchintsev, Semyon	Russia	C	2022–2023	1	0	0	0	0	—	—	—	—	—	
Derlago, Bill	Canada	C	1979–1986	378	158	176	334	179	10	4	0	4	8	
Dermott, Travis	Canada	D	2017–2022	251	12	40	52	100	22	2	3	5	8	
Devane, Jamie	Canada	LW	2013–2014	2	0	0	0	0	—	—	—	—	—	
Deveaux, Andre	Canada	C	2008–2010	22	0	1	1	75	—	—	—	—	—	
Devereaux, Boyd	Canada	C	2006–2009	118	21	27	48	38	—	—	—	—	—	
Dewar, Connor	Canada	C	2023–2025	48	1	7	8	13	6	0	1	1	0	
Dickens, Ernie†	Canada	D	1941–1942; 1945–1946	25	3	5	8	12	13	0	0	0	4	SC 1942
Diduck, Gerald	Canada	D	1999–2000	26	0	3	3	33	10	0	1	1	14	
DiPietro, Paul	Canada	C	1994–1996	32	5	5	10	10	7	1	1	2	0	
**Domi, Max***	Canada	LW	2023–2026	234	29	87	116	289	20	4	7	11	39	
Domi, Tie	Canada	RW	1989–1990; 1994–2006	777	84	112	196	2,265	86	5	11	16	183	
Doraty, Ken	Canada	F	1932–1935	83	15	25	40	22	15	7	2	9	2	
Dorey, Jim	Canada	D	1968–1972	231	25	74	99	553	10	0	2	2	40	
Douglas, Kent†	Canada	D	1962–1967	283	20	65	85	408	19	1	3	4	33	SC 1963
Downie, Dave	Canada	C/RW	1932–1933	11	0	1	1	2	—	—	—	—	—	
Draper, Bruce	Canada	C	1962–1963	1	0	0	0	0	—	—	—	—	—	
Drillon, Gordie†	Canada	RW	1936–1942	262	127	117	244	42	45	22	13	35	10	SC 1942; HHoF 1975
Druken, Harold	Canada	C	2002–2004	14	0	6	6	4	—	—	—	—	—	
Duff, Dick†	Canada	LW	1954–1964	582	174	168	342	535	54	14	23	37	40	SC 1962–1963; HHoF 2006
Duncan, Art	Canada	D	1927–1931	122	15	14	29	199	5	0	0	0	4	
Duncas, Rocky	Canada	RW	1989–1990	5	0	0	0	14	—	—	—	—	—	
Dunlap, Frank	Canada	LW/RW	1943–1944	15	0	1	1	2	—	—	—	—	—	
Dunn, Dave	Canada	D	1974–1976	115	3	19	22	226	10	1	1	2	41	
Dupere, Denis	Canada	LW	1970–1975	192	29	44	73	26	14	0	0	0	0	
Dupont, Jerry	Canada	D	1986–1987	13	0	0	0	23	—	—	—	—	—	
Dupuis, Philippe	Canada	C	2011–2012	30	0	0	0	16	—	—	—	—	—	
Duris, Vitezslav	Czechoslovakia	D	1980–1983	89	3	20	23	62	3	0	1	1	2	
Dye, Babe†	Canada	RW	1919–1926; 1930–1931	177	173	42	215	190	6	2	0	2	9	SC 1922; HHoF 1962
Eakins, Dallas	United States	D	1998–1999	18	0	2	2	24	1	0	0	0	0	
Earl, Robbie	United States	LW	2007–2008	9	0	1	1	0	—	—	—	—	—	
Eastwood, Mike	Canada	C	1991–1995	111	14	23	37	85	28	4	4	8	20	
Ecclestone, Tim	Canada	LW	1973–1975	51	10	15	25	32	4	0	1	1	0	
Edmundson, Garry	Canada	LW	1959–1961	42	4	6	10	47	9	0	1	1	4	
Edmundson, Joel	Canada	D	2023–2024	9	0	0	0	4	7	0	1	1	6	
Ehman, Gerry†	Canada	RW	1958–1964	125	26	31	57	40	30	7	7	14	12	SC 1964
**Ekman-Larsson, Oliver***	Sweden	D	2024–2026	155	12	56	68	122	13	2	2	4	8	
Ellett, Dave	United States	D	1990–1997	446	51	172	223	371	52	7	25	32	43	
Ellis, Ron†	Canada	RW	1963–1981	1,034	332	308	640	207	70	18	8	26	20	SC 1967
Engvall, Pierre	Sweden	LW	2019–2023	226	42	41	83	67	17	0	4	4	26	
Ennis, Tyler	Canada	C	2018–2019	51	12	6	18	2	5	0	2	2	2	
Erickson, Aut†	Canada	D	1966–1967	—	—	—	—	—	1	0	0	0	2	SC 1967
Eriksson, Anders	Sweden	D	2001–2003	38	0	2	2	12	10	0	0	0	0	
Erixon, Tim	Sweden	D	2014–2015	15	1	0	1	6	—	—	—	—	—	
Esau, Len	Canada	D	1991–1992	2	0	0	0	0	—	—	—	—	—	
Evans, Chris	Canada	D	1969–1970	2	0	0	0	0	—	—	—	—	—	
Evans, Daryl	Canada	LW	1986–1987	2	1	0	1	0	1	0	0	0	0	
Evans, Paul	Canada	C/LW	1976–1978	11	1	1	2	21	2	0	0	0	0	
Exelby, Garnet	Canada	D	2009–2010	51	1	3	4	73	—	—	—	—	—	
Ezinicki, Bill†	Canada	RW	1944–1950	271	56	79	135	525	34	4	7	11	69	SC 1947—1949
Farkas, Jeff	United States	RW	2000–2002	8	0	2	2	6	5	1	0	1	0	
Fehr, Eric	Canada	RW	2016–2018	5	0	0	0	2	—	—	—	—	—	
Fergus, Tom	United States	C	1985–1992	357	118	179	297	324	23	9	12	21	14	
Finger, Jeff	United States	D	2008–2010	105	8	25	33	63	—	—	—	—	—	
Finnigan, Frank†	Canada	RW	1931–1932; 1934–1937	154	14	26	40	61	25	3	8	11	10	SC 1932
Fisher, Alvin	Canada	RW	1924–1925	9	1	0	1	4	—	—	—	—	—	
Fitzgerald, Tom	United States	RW	2002–2004	135	11	23	34	109	17	0	1	1	10	
Flaman, Fern†	Canada	D	1950–1954	228	4	27	31	368	15	1	2	3	26	HHoF 1990; SC 1951
Flett, Bill	Canada	RW	1974–1975	77	15	25	40	38	5	0	0	0	2	
Foley, Gerry	United States	RW	1954–1955	4	0	0	0	8	—	—	—	—	—	
Foligno, Mike	Canada	RW	1990–1994	129	27	20	47	203	18	2	6	8	42	
Foligno, Nick	United States	C	2020–2021	7	0	4	4	4	4	0	1	1	5	
Forsey, Jack	Canada	RW	1942–1943	19	7	9	16	10	3	0	1	1	0	
Fortier, Dave	Canada	D	1972–1973	23	1	4	5	63	—	—	—	—	—	
Foster, Alex	United States	C	2007–2008	3	0	0	0	0	—	—	—	—	—	
Fowler, Jimmy	Canada	D	1936–1939	135	18	29	47	39	18	0	3	3	2	
Franceschetti, Lou	Canada	RW	1989–1991	96	22	16	38	157	5	0	1	1	26	
Francis, Ron†	Canada	C	2003–2004	12	3	7	10	0	12	0	4	4	2	HHoF 2007
Franson, Cody	Canada	D	2011–2015	236	20	95	115	86	7	3	3	6	0	
Fraser, Mark	Canada	D	2012–2014	64	0	9	9	118	4	0	1	1	7	
Frattin, Matt	Canada	RW	2015–2016	9	0	0	0	4	—	—	—	—	—	
Froese, Byron	Canada	C	2015–2017	58	2	3	5	21	—	—	—	—	—	
Frogren, Jonas	Sweden	D	2008–2009	41	1	6	7	28	—	—	—	—	—	
Frycer, Miroslav	Czechoslovakia	RW	1981–1988	329	115	153	268	374	17	3	8	11	16	
Gagne, Paul	Canada	LW	1988–1989	16	3	2	5	6	—	—	—	—	—	
Gagner, Dave	Canada	C	1995–1996	28	7	15	22	59	6	0	2	2	6	
Galchenyuk, Alex	United States	C	2020–2021	26	4	8	12	14	6	1	3	4	4	
Gamache, Simon	Canada	C	2007–2008	11	2	2	4	6	—	—	—	—	—	
Gamble, Dick	Canada	LW	1965–1967	3	1	0	1	0	—	—	—	—	—	
Gardiner, Jake	United States	D	2011–2019	551	45	200	245	185	26	2	10	12	6	
Gardner, Cal†	Canada	C	1948–1952	220	58	95	153	129	30	4	6	10	10	SC 1949, 1951
Gardner, Paul	Canada	C	1978–1980	56	18	15	33	10	6	0	1	1	4	
Gariepy, Ray	Canada	D	1955–1956	1	0	0	0	4	—	—	—	—	—	
Garland, Scott	Canada	C	1975–1977	85	13	23	36	91	7	1	2	3	35	
Gartner, Mike†	Canada	RW	1993–1996	130	53	33	86	62	29	11	9	20	20	HHoF 2001
Gauthier, Frederik	Canada	C	2015–2020	168	13	18	31	45	8	0	0	0	2	
Gavey, Aaron	Canada	C	2002–2003	5	0	1	1	0	—	—	—	—	—	
Gavin, Stewart	Canada	LW	1980–1985	268	34	48	82	214	4	0	0	0	0	
Gibson, John	Canada	D	1981–1982	27	0	2	2	67	—	—	—	—	—	
Gill, Hal	United States	D	2006–2008	145	8	32	40	143	—	—	—	—	—	
Gill, Todd	Canada	D	1984–1996	639	59	210	269	922	77	5	26	31	171	
Gilmour, Doug†	Canada	C	1991–1997; 2002–2003	393	131	321	452	386	52	17	60	77	90	HHoF 2011
Gingras, Gaston	Canada	D	1982–1985	109	17	40	57	26	3	1	2	3	2	
Giordano, Mark	Canada	D	2021–2024	144	9	36	45	112	18	0	4	4	13	
Girard, Ken	Canada	RW	1956–1960	7	0	1	1	2	—	—	—	—	—	
Gleason, Tim	United States	D	2013–2014	39	1	4	5	55	—	—	—	—	—	
Glennie, Brian	Canada	D	1969–1978	554	12	98	110	599	32	0	1	1	66	
Godden, Ernie	Canada	C	1981–1982	5	1	1	2	6	—	—	—	—	—	
Godynyuk, Alexander	Soviet Union; Ukraine	D	1990–1992	49	3	9	12	75	—	—	—	—	—	
Goldham, Bob†	Canada	D	1941–1947	79	12	22	34	79	13	2	2	4	31	SC 1942
Goldup, Hank†	Canada	LW	1939–1943	99	29	34	63	28	26	5	1	6	6	SC 1942
Gorman, Edwin	Canada	D	1927–1928	19	0	1	1	30	—	—	—	—	—	
Govedaris, Chris	Canada	LW	1993–1994	12	2	2	4	14	2	0	0	0	0	
Grabner, Michael	Austria	RW	2015–2016	80	9	9	18	12	—	—	—	—	—	
Grabovski, Mikhail	Belarus	C	2008–2013	340	91	117	208	237	7	0	2	2	2	
Gracie, Bob	Canada	C/LW	1930–1933	104	26	23	49	60	18	3	2	5	0	
Graham, Pat	Canada	LW	1983–1984	41	4	4	8	65	—	—	—	—	—	
Granberg, Petter	Sweden	D	2013–2015	8	0	0	0	6	—	—	—	—	—	
Gravel, Kevin	United States	D	2019–2020	3	0	0	0	0	—	—	—	—	—	
Gray, Alex	Canada	RW	1928–1929	7	0	0	0	2	4	0	0	0	0	
Grebenkin, Nikita	Russia	RW	2024–2025	7	0	0	0	2	—	—	—	—	—	
Green, Travis	Canada	C	2001–2003; 2006–2007	181	23	35	58	149	24	5	7	12	36	
Greening, Colin	Canada	C/LW	2015–2017	30	7	8	15	13	—	—	—	—	—	
Gregor, Noah	Canada	C	2023–2024	63	6	6	12	17	2	0	0	0	0	
Greig, Mark	Canada	RW	1993–1994	13	2	2	4	10	—	—	—	—	—	
Griffith, Seth	Canada	C	2016–2017	3	0	0	0	0	—	—	—	—	—	
Grisdale, John	Canada	D	1972–1975	51	1	7	8	80	—	—	—	—	—	
Gross, Lloyd	Canada	LW	1926–1927	6	1	1	2	0	—	—	—	—	—	
**Groulx, Benoit-Olivier***	France	C	2025–2026	13	3	2	5	0	—	—	—	—	—	
Gunnarsson, Carl	Sweden	D	2009–2014	304	15	71	86	92	7	0	1	1	0	
Gustafsson, Erik	Sweden	D	2022–2023	9	0	4	4	2	2	1	0	1	0	
Gustafsson, Per	Sweden	D	1997–1998	22	1	4	5	10	—	—	—	—	—	
Haggerty, Sean	United States	LW	1995–1996	1	0	0	0	0	—	—	—	—	—	
Hagman, Niklas	Finland	LW	2008–2010	120	42	33	75	27	—	—	—	—	—	
Hainsey, Ron	United States	D	2017–2019	161	9	37	46	41	14	0	2	2	6	
Hakanpaa, Jani	Finland	D	2024–2025	2	0	0	0	0	—	—	—	—	—	
Halderson, Harold	Canada	D	1926–1927	25	1	2	3	36	—	—	—	—	—	
Halkidis, Bob	Canada	D	1991–1992	46	3	3	6	145	—	—	—	—	—	
Hamel, Herbert	Canada	RW	1930–1931	2	0	0	0	4	—	—	—	—	—	
Hamilton, Jackie	Canada	C	1942–1946	102	28	32	60	20	11	2	1	3	0	
Hamilton, Jeff	United States	C	2008–2009	15	3	3	6	4	—	—	—	—	—	
Hamilton, Reg†	Canada	D	1935–1945	366	20	77	97	379	60	3	7	10	38	SC 1945
Hamilton, Ryan	Canada	LW	2011–2013	12	0	3	3	2	2	0	1	1	0	
Hammarstrom, Inge	Sweden	LW	1973–1978	292	85	82	167	74	13	2	3	5	4	
Hammond, Ken	Canada	D	1988–1989	14	0	2	2	12	—	—	—	—	—	
Hampson, Ted	Canada	C	1959–1960	41	2	8	10	17	—	—	—	—	—	
Hannan, Dave	Canada	C	1989–1992	148	19	34	53	153	3	1	0	1	4	
Hannigan, Gord	Canada	C	1952–1956	161	29	31	60	117	9	2	0	2	8	
Hannigan, Pat	Canada	LW	1959–1960	1	0	0	0	0	—	—	—	—	—	
Hannigan, Ray	Canada	RW	1948–1949	3	0	0	0	2	—	—	—	—	—	
Hanson, Christian	United States	C	2008–2011	42	3	6	9	22	—	—	—	—	—	
Harrington, Scott	Canada	D	2015–2016	15	0	1	1	4	—	—	—	—	—	
Harlock, David	Canada	D	1993–1996	8	0	0	0	0	—	—	—	—	—	
Harris, Billy†	Canada	C	1955–1965	610	106	181	287	187	62	8	10	18	30	SC 1962–1964
Harris, Billy	Canada	RW	1981–1984	146	20	29	49	44	4	0	1	1	2	
Harris, Duke	Canada	RW	1967–1968	4	0	0	0	0	—	—	—	—	—	
Harrison, Jay	Canada	D	2005–2009	20	0	2	2	18	—	—	—	—	—	
Harrison, Jim	Canada	C	1969–1972	175	39	47	86	248	11	1	1	2	33	
Hassard, Bob	Canada	C	1949–1954	109	9	28	37	18	—	—	—	—	—	
Hawkins, Todd	Canada	LW/RW	1991–1992	2	0	0	0	0	—	—	—	—	—	
**Haymes, Luke***	Canada	F	2025–2026	4	0	1	1	2	—	—	—	—	—	
Healey, Paul	Canada	LW	2001–2003	65	6	14	20	18	22	0	2	2	4	
Hedin, Pierre	Sweden	D	2003–2004	3	0	1	1	0	—	—	—	—	—	
Heffernan, Frank	Canada	D	1919–1920	19	0	1	1	10	—	—	—	—	—	
Henderson, Paul	Canada	RW	1967–1974	408	162	156	318	166	19	6	6	12	12	
Hendrickson, Darby	United States	C	1994–1996; 1996–1999	233	27	20	47	195	2	0	0	0	0	
Herbert, Jimmy	Canada	C/RW	1927–1928	31	10	4	14	41	—	—	—	—	—	
Heron, Robert	Canada	C	1938–1941	83	20	17	37	24	18	2	2	4	6	
Heward, Jamie	Canada	D	1995–1997	25	1	4	5	6	—	—	—	—	—	
Hickey, Pat	Canada	LW	1979–1982	118	38	49	87	65	5	0	0	0	2	
Higgins, Paul	Canada	RW	1981–1983	25	0	0	0	152	1	0	0	0	0	
Hill, Mel	Canada	RW	1942–1946	146	49	61	110	77	19	5	3	8	6	
Hillman, Larry†	Canada	D	1961–1968	265	13	75	88	185	32	2	3	5	8	SC 1959, 1962, 1963, 1964, 1967, 1969; Youngest SC Player
Hinse, Andre	Canada	LW	1967–1968	4	0	0	0	0	—	—	—	—	—	
Hodgson, Dan	Canada	C	1985–1986	40	13	12	25	12	—	—	—	—	—	
Hoglund, Jonas	Sweden	LW	1999–2003	325	78	106	184	62	49	6	11	17	8	
Hogue, Benoit	Canada	C	1994–1996	56	15	28	43	68	7	0	0	0	6	
Holden, Josh	Canada	C	2002–2004	6	1	0	1	2	—	—	—	—	—	
Holl, Justin	United States	D	2017–2023	285	11	71	82	150	25	0	3	3	23	
Holland, Peter	Canada	C	2013–2017	174	25	38	63	79	—	—	—	—	—	
Hollett, William	Canada	D	1933–1934; 1934–1936	63	11	20	31	50	7	0	0	0	6	
Hollowell, Mac	Canada	D	2022–2023	6	0	2	2	2	—	—	—	—	—	
Hollweg, Ryan	United States	C	2008–2009	25	0	2	2	38	—	—	—	—	—	
Holmberg, Pontus	Sweden	RW	2022–2025	159	19	30	49	63	19	0	1	1	6	
Holway, Albert	Canada	D	1923–1926	42	3	2	5	20	2	0	0	0	0	
Holzer, Korbinian	Germany	D	2010–2015	58	2	7	9	55	—	—	—	—	—	
Hopkins, Larry	Canada	C	1967–1968	4	0	0	0	0	—	—	—	—	—	
Horne, George	Canada	RW	1928–1929	39	9	3	12	32	4	0	0	0	4	
Horner, Reginald†	Canada	D	1928–1940	490	42	110	152	1,254	71	7	10	17	170	HHoF 1965; SC 1932
Horton, Tim†	Canada	D	1949–1970	1,185	109	349	458	1,389	97	9	32	41	135	HHoF 1977; SC 1962–1964, 1967
Horvath, Bronco	Canada	C	1962–1963	10	0	4	4	12	—	—	—	—	—	
Hotham, Greg	Canada	D	1979–1982	60	4	11	15	21	—	—	—	—	—	
Housley, Phil†	United States	D	2002–2003	1	0	0	0	2	3	0	0	0	0	HHoF 2015
Howard, Jack	Canada	D	1936–1937	2	0	0	0	0	—	—	—	—	—	
Howe, Syd†	Canada	C/LW	1931–1932	3	0	0	0	0	—	—	—	—	—	HHoF 1965
Huard, Roland	Canada	C	1930–1931	1	1	0	1	0	—	—	—	—	—	
Hubick, Greg	Canada	D	1975–1976	72	6	8	14	10	—	—	—	—	—	
Hudson, Mike	Canada	C/LW	1995–1996	27	2	0	2	29	—	—	—	—	—	
Hunt, Dryden	Canada	LW	2022–2023	9	1	0	1	9	—	—	—	—	—	
Hunwick, Matt	United States	D	2015–2017	132	3	26	29	50	6	0	1	1	2	
Hurst, Ron	Canada	RW	1955–1957	64	9	7	16	70	3	0	2	2	4	
Hutchison, Dave	Canada	D	1978–1980; 1983–1984	157	5	24	29	400	6	0	3	3	23	
Hutton, Ben	Canada	D	2020–2021	4	0	0	0	0	—	—	—	—	—	
Hyman, Zach	Canada	C	2015–2021	345	86	99	185	201	32	5	8	13	14	
Iafrate, Al	United States	D	1984–1991	472	81	169	250	546	29	4	10	14	21	
Ihnacak, Miroslav	Czechoslovakia	LW	1985–1987	55	8	9	17	39	1	0	0	0	0	
Ihnacak, Peter	Czechoslovakia	C	1982–1990	417	102	165	267	175	28	4	10	14	25	
Imlach, Brent	Canada	F	1965–1967	3	0	0	0	0	—	—	—	—	—	
Ingoldsby, Jack	Canada	RW/D	1942–1944	29	5	1	6	15	—	—	—	—	—	
Intranuovo, Ralph	Canada	C	1996–1997	3	0	1	1	0	—	—	—	—	—	
Irwin, Brayden	Canada	RW	2009–2010	2	0	0	0	2	—	—	—	—	—	
Jackman, Ric	Canada	D	2002–2004	71	2	6	8	54	—	—	—	—	—	
Jackson, Art†	Canada	C	1934–1937; 1944–1945	113	17	31	48	26	17	0	3	3	4	SC 1945
Jackson, Busher†	Canada	LW	1929–1939	432	186	165	351	342	54	17	8	25	41	HHoF 1971; SC 1932
Jackson, Jeff	Canada	LW	1984–1987	77	9	10	19	90	—	—	—	—	—	
Jackson, Stan	Canada	LW	1921–1925	26	1	1	2	13	—	—	—	—	—	
Jacobs, Paul	Canada	D	1918–1919	1	0	0	0	0	—	—	—	—	—	
James, Gerry	Canada	RW	1954–1960	149	14	26	40	257	15	1	0	1	0	
James, Val	United States	LW	1986–1987	4	0	0	0	14	—	—	—	—	—	
**Jarnkrok, Calle***	Sweden	C	2022–2026	200	37	38	75	44	30	1	3	4	2	
Jarrett, Gary	Canada	LW	1960–1961	1	0	0	0	0	—	—	—	—	—	
Jarry, Pierre	Canada	LW	1971–1974	104	24	30	54	65	5	0	1	1	0	
Jarvis, James	Canada	LW	1936–1937	24	1	0	1	0	—	—	—	—	—	
Jarvis, Wes	Canada	C	1984–1988	29	1	1	2	4	2	0	0	0	2	
Jeffrey, Larry†	Canada	LW	1965–1967	76	12	18	30	49	6	0	1	1	4	SC 1967
Jenkins, Roger	United States	RW/D	1930–1931	21	0	0	0	12	—	—	—	—	—	
Jennings, Grant	Canada	D	1994–1995	10	0	2	2	7	4	0	0	0	0	
Johansen, Bill	Canada	C/RW	1949–1950	1	0	0	0	0	—	—	—	—	—	
Johansen, Trevor	Canada	D	1977–1979; 1981–1982	132	4	21	25	134	13	0	3	3	21	
Johansson, Calle	Sweden	D	2003–2004	8	0	6	6	0	—	—	—	—	—	
Johnson, Craig	United States	LW	2003–2004	10	1	1	2	6	—	—	—	—	—	
Johnson, Dan	Canada	C	1969–1970	1	0	0	0	0	—	—	—	—	—	
Johnson, Mike	Canada	RW	1996–2000	226	48	72	120	86	17	3	2	5	4	
Johnson, Terry	Canada	D	1986–1987	48	0	1	1	104	5	0	0	0	10	
Johnsson, Andreas	Sweden	LW	2017–2020	125	30	37	67	46	14	2	4	6	2	
Johnston, Greg	Canada	RW	1990–1992	4	0	1	1	5	—	—	—	—	—	
Johnstone, Ross	Canada	D	1943–1945	42	5	4	9	14	3	0	0	0	0	
Jokinen, Olli	Finland	C	2014–2015	6	0	1	1	2	—	—	—	—	—	
Jones, Alvin	Canada	D	1942–1943	16	0	0	0	22	6	0	0	0	8	
Jones, Jimmy	Canada	RW	1977–1980	148	13	18	31	68	19	1	5	6	11	
Jonsson, Kenny	Sweden	D	1994–1996	89	6	29	35	38	4	0	0	0	0	
**Joshua, Dakota***	United States	C	2025–2026	55	10	8	18	49	—	—	—	—	—	
Joyal, Eddie	Canada	C	1965–1966	14	0	2	2	2	—	—	—	—	—	
Juzda, Bill	Canada	D	1948–1952	211	3	29	32	220	30	0	2	2	33	
Kaberle, Tomas	Czech Republic	D	1998–2011	878	83	437	520	246	77	6	22	28	24	
Kadri, Nazem	Canada	C	2009–2019	561	161	196	357	387	19	3	7	10	56	
Kampf, David	Czech Republic	C	2021–2025	301	31	54	85	60	26	3	3	6	10	
Kampman, Rudolph†	Canada	D	1937–1942	189	14	30	44	287	47	1	4	5	38	SC 1942
Kapanen, Kasperi	Finland	RW	2015–2020	202	41	49	90	55	25	4	3	7	16	
Karpovtsev, Alexander	Russia	D	1998–2000	125	5	39	44	106	25	1	6	7	16	
Kaše, Ondřej	Czech Republic	RW	2021–2022	50	14	13	27	14	7	0	3	3	6	
Kaszycki, Mike	Canada	C	1979–1983	53	5	19	24	22	2	0	0	0	2	
Keeling, Melville	Canada	LW	1926–1928	73	21	8	29	81	—	—	—	—	—	
Keenan, Larry	Canada	LW	1961–1962	2	0	0	0	0	—	—	—	—	—	
Kehoe, Rick	Canada	RW	1971–1974	184	59	72	131	32	2	0	0	0	2	
Kelly, Leonard†	Canada	D/C	1959–1967	470	119	232	351	74	70	17	38	55	16	HHoF 1969; SC 1962–1964, 1967
Kelly, Pep	Canada	RW	1934–1937; 1937–1940	230	55	46	101	98	38	7	6	13	10	
Kemp, Stan	Canada	D	1948–1949	1	0	0	0	2	—	—	—	—	—	
Kerfoot, Alexander	Canada	C	2019–2023	285	40	94	134	94	30	4	9	13	14	
Kendall, Bill	Canada	RW	1936–1937	15	2	4	6	4	—	—	—	—	—	
Kennedy, Forbes	Canada	C	1968–1969	13	0	3	3	24	1	0	0	0	38	
Kennedy, Mike	Canada	C	1997–1998	13	0	1	1	14	—	—	—	—	—	
Kennedy, Ted†	Canada	C	1942–1957	696	231	329	560	432	78	29	31	60	32	HHoF 1966; SC 1945–1949, 1951
Keon, Dave†	Canada	C	1960–1975	1,062	365	493	858	75	89	32	35	67	6	HHoF 1986; SC 1962–1964, 1967
Kessel, Phil	United States	RW	2009–2015	446	181	213	394	140	7	4	2	6	2	
Khavanov, Alexander	Russia	D	2005–2006	64	6	6	12	60	—	—	—	—	—	
Khristich, Dmitri	Ukraine	LW/C	1999–2001	80	15	24	39	32	12	1	2	3	0	
Kilger, Chad	Canada	LW	2003–2008	219	42	33	75	141	13	2	1	3	0	
Kilrea, Hec	Canada	LW	1933–1935	89	21	26	47	31	11	2	0	2	6	
King, Derek	Canada	LW	1997–2000	161	45	53	98	65	16	1	3	4	4	
King, Kris	Canada	LW	1997–2000	188	7	9	16	359	18	1	1	2	27	
Kirton, Mark	Canada	C	1979–1981	13	1	0	1	2	—	—	—	—	—	
Kitchen, Bill	Canada	D	1984–1985	29	1	4	5	27	—	—	—	—	—	
Klee, Ken	United States	D	2003–2006	122	7	37	44	102	11	0	0	0	6	
Klingberg, John	Sweden	D	2023–2024	14	0	5	5	8	—	—	—	—	—	
Klukay, Joe†	Canada	LW	1946–1952; 1954–1956	416	76	94	170	138	56	12	8	20	16	SC 1947–1949, 1951
**Knies, Matthew***	United States	LW	2022–2026	240	67	93	160	119	27	8	6	14	12	
Knox, Paul	Canada	RW	1954–1955	1	0	0	0	0	—	—	—	—	—	
Kohn, Ladislav	Czech Republic	RW	1998–1999	16	1	3	4	4	2	0	0	0	0	
Kolesar, Mark	Canada	LW	1995–1997	28	2	2	4	14	3	1	0	1	2	
Komisarek, Mike	United States	D	2009–2013	158	2	17	19	169	—	—	—	—	—	
Komarov, Leo	Finland	C	2012–2018	327	52	70	122	138	15	0	1	1	19	
Kondratiev, Maxim	Russia	D	2003–2004	7	0	0	0	2	—	—	—	—	—	
Kordic, John	Canada	RW	1988–1991	104	10	6	16	446	5	0	1	1	33	
Korn, Jim	United States	D/LW	1981–1985	197	26	43	69	708	3	0	0	0	26	
Korolev, Igor	Russia	C	1997–2001	297	60	101	161	118	24	0	4	4	6	
Korshkov, Yegor	Russia	F	2019–2020	1	1	0	1	0	—	—	—	—	—	
Kostka, Mike	Canada	D	2012–2013	35	0	8	8	27	1	0	0	0	0	
Kotsopoulos, Chris	Canada	D	1985–1989	182	11	37	48	221	17	1	0	1	28	
Kozak, Les	Canada	LW	1961–1962	12	1	0	1	2	—	—	—	—	—	
Kozun, Brandon	United States	RW	2014–2015	20	2	2	4	6	—	—	—	—	—	
Kraftcheck, Steve	Canada	D	1958–1959	8	1	0	1	0	—	—	—	—	—	
Kral, Filip	Czech Republic	D	2022–2023	2	0	0	0	2	—	—	—	—	—	
Kronwall, Staffan	Sweden	D	2005–2008	52	0	1	1	21	—	—	—	—	—	
Krushelnyski, Mike	Canada	LW/C	1990–1994	269	50	63	113	210	22	3	7	10	8	
Kubina, Pavel	Czech Republic	D	2006–2009	215	32	69	101	258	—	—	—	—	—	
Kudashov, Alexei	Russia	C	1993–1994	25	1	0	1	4	—	—	—	—	—	
Kulemin, Nikolay	Russia	LW	2008–2014	421	84	111	195	112	7	0	1	1	0	
Kurtenbach, Orland	Canada	C	1965–1966	70	9	6	15	54	4	0	0	0	20	
Kurvers, Tom	United States	D	1989–1991	89	15	40	55	37	5	0	3	3	4	
Kypreos, Nick	Canada	LW	1995–1997	54	4	3	7	92	5	0	0	0	4	
Lacroix, Eric	Canada	LW	1993–1994	3	0	0	0	2	—	—	—	—	—	
Lafferty, Sam	United States	C/LW	2022–2023	19	2	4	6	9	9	1	2	3	2	
Lagesson, William	Sweden	D	2023–2024	30	0	4	4	19	—	—	—	—	—	
Laich, Brooks	Canada	C	2015–2016	21	1	6	7	2	—	—	—	—	—	
Lajoie, Maxime	Canada	D	2023–2024	7	0	1	1	0	—	—	—	—	—	
Landon, Larry	Canada	RW	1984–1985	7	0	0	0	2	—	—	—	—	—	
Langelle, Pete†	Canada	C	1938–1942	136	22	51	73	11	39	5	9	14	4	SC 1942
Lanz, Rick	Canada	D	1986–1989	151	9	50	59	115	14	1	3	4	29	
**Laughton, Scott***	Canada	C	2024–2026	63	10	6	16	28	13	0	2	2	8	
Leeman, Gary	Canada	RW	1983–1992	545	176	231	407	463	24	7	14	21	34	
Leetch, Brian†	United States	D	2003–2004	15	2	13	15	10	13	0	8	8	6	HHoF 2009
Lehtonen, Mikko	Finland	D	2020–2021	9	0	3	3	4	—	—	—	—	—	
Leivo, Josh	Canada	LW	2013–2019	84	14	14	28	27	—	—	—	—	—	
Leipsic, Brendan	Canada	LW	2015–2017	6	1	2	3	2	—	—	—	—	—	
Lefebvre, Sylvain	Canada	D	1992–1994	165	4	21	25	169	39	3	6	9	36	
Levinsky, Alex†	United States	D	1930–1934	150	11	21	32	130	18	1	0	1	20	SC 1932
Lewicki, Danny	Canada	LW	1950–1954	123	21	31	52	66	9	0	0	0	0	
Ley, Rick	Canada	D	1968–1972	229	8	54	62	416	14	0	2	2	20	
Liddington, Bob	Canada	LW	1970–1971	11	0	1	1	2	—	—	—	—	—	
Liles, John-Michael	United States	D	2011–2014	104	9	29	38	24	4	0	0	0	2	
Liljegren, Timothy	Sweden	D	2019–2025	197	14	51	65	66	13	0	1	1	2	
Lindberg, Tobias	Sweden	RW	2015–2017	6	0	2	2	4	—	—	—	—	—	
Lindholm, Par	Sweden	C	2018–2019	61	1	11	12	18	—	—	—	—	—	
Lindros, Eric†	Canada	C	2005–2006	33	11	11	22	43	—	—	—	—	—	HHoF 2016
Lindstrom, Joakim	Sweden	C	2014–2015	19	1	3	4	4	—	—	—	—	—	
Linseman, Ken	Canada	C	1991–1992	2	0	0	0	2	—	—	—	—	—	
Litzenberger, Ed†	Canada	C/RW	1961–1964	114	17	23	40	24	20	1	4	5	20	SC 1962–1964
Loiselle, Claude	Canada	C	1990–1992	71	7	10	17	104	—	—	—	—	—	
Lombardi, Matthew	Canada	C	2011–2012	62	8	10	18	10	—	—	—	—	—	
**Lorentz, Steven***	Canada	C/LW	2024–2026	151	15	22	37	25	13	0	2	2	4	
Loughlin, Wilf	Canada	D/LW	1923–1924	14	0	0	0	2	—	—	—	—	—	
Loov, Viktor	Sweden	D	2015–2016	4	0	2	2	0	—	—	—	—	—	
Lowrey, Gerry	Canada	LW	1927–1929	57	9	16	25	53	—	—	—	—	—	
Luce, Don	Canada	C	1981–1982	39	4	4	8	32	—	—	—	—	—	
Lumme, Jyrki	Finland	D	2001–2003	124	10	19	29	64	21	0	2	2	8	
Lundmark, Jamie	Canada	C	2009–2010	15	1	2	3	16	—	—	—	—	—	
Lundrigan, Joe	Canada	D	1972–1973	49	2	8	10	20	—	—	—	—	—	
Lupul, Joffrey	Canada	LW	2010–2017	280	88	94	182	161	7	3	1	4	4	
Lynn, Vic†	Canada	LW/D	1946–1950	213	32	58	90	172	35	6	9	15	40	SC 1947–1949
Lyubushkin, Ilya	Russia	D	2021–2022; 2023–2024	50	2	8	10	31	14	0	4	4	20	
MacArthur, Clarke	Canada	LW	2010–2013	195	49	76	125	100	5	2	1	3	2	
**Maccelli, Matias***	Finland	LW	2025–2026	71	14	25	39	16	—	—	—	—	—	
MacDonald, Parker	Canada	C	1952–1955	63	8	3	11	36	4	0	0	0	4	
MacKasey, Blair	Canada	D	1976–1977	1	0	0	0	2	—	—	—	—	—	
Mackell, Fleming†	Canada	C	1947–1952	152	22	35	57	88	27	5	8	13	24	SC 1949, 1951
MacLean, Donald	Canada	C	2000–2001	3	0	1	1	2	—	—	—	—	—	
MacMillan, Bill	Canada	RW	1970–1972	137	32	26	58	81	11	0	3	3	2	
MacMillan, John†	Canada	RW	1960–1964	81	5	6	11	26	8	0	0	0	0	SC 1962, 1963
MacNeil, Al	Canada	D	1955–1960	71	4	8	12	97	—	—	—	—	—	
Macoun, Jamie	Canada	D	1991–1998	466	13	88	101	506	52	2	11	13	64	
MacWilliam, Andrew	Canada	D	2014–2015	12	0	2	2	12	—	—	—	—	—	
Maggs, Darryl	Canada	D	1979–1980	5	0	0	0	0	—	—	—	—	—	
Magnan, Marc	Canada	LW	1982–1983	4	0	1	1	5	—	—	—	—	—	
Maguire, Kevin	Canada	RW	1986–1987; 1990–1992	88	10	5	15	258	1	0	0	0	0	
Mahovlich, Frank†	Canada	LW	1956–1968	720	296	301	597	782	84	24	36	60	135	SC 1962–1964, 1967; HHoF 1981
Mair, Adam	Canada	C	1999–2001	24	1	2	3	20	10	1	0	1	22	
Malgin, Denis	Switzerland	C	2019–2020; 2022—2023	31	2	2	4	6	—	—	—	—	—	
Maloney, Dan	Canada	LW	1977–1982	270	65	84	149	538	22	4	6	10	23	
Maloney, Phil	Canada	C	1950–1953	30	3	6	9	2	—	—	—	—	—	
Manderville, Kent	Canada	C	1991–1995	136	8	15	23	102	37	2	0	2	12	
Mann, Norman	Great Britain	RW/C	1939–1941	31	0	3	3	4	2	0	0	0	0	
Manno, Bob	Canada	D	1981–1982	72	9	41	50	67	—	—	—	—	—	
Manson, Dave	Canada	D	2000–2002	87	4	8	12	103	2	0	0	0	2	
Marcetta, Milan†	Canada	C	1966–1967	—	—	—	—	—	3	0	0	0	0	SC 1967
Marchenko, Alexey	Russia	D	2016–2017	11	1	1	2	8	—	—	—	—	—	
Marchinko, Brian	Canada	C	1970–1972	5	0	0	0	0	—	—	—	—	—	
Marchment, Bryan	Canada	D	2003–2004	75	1	3	4	106	13	0	0	0	8	
Marchment, Mason	Canada	F	2019–2020	4	0	1	1	0	—	—	—	—	—	
Marincin, Martin	Slovakia	D	2015–2020	142	4	19	23	78	9	0	0	0	2	
Marker, Gus	Canada	RW	1938–1941	98	23	20	43	36	27	3	5	8	28	
Markle, Jack	Canada	RW	1935–1936	8	0	1	1	0	—	—	—	—	—	
Markov, Danny	Russia	D	1997–2001	200	9	36	45	137	40	1	10	11	40	
Marleau, Patrick	Canada	C	2017–2019	164	43	41	84	44	14	4	3	7	6	
Marner, Mitch	Canada	RW	2016–2025	657	221	520	741	198	70	13	50	63	20	
Marks, Jack	Canada	LW/D	1917–1918	5	0	0	0	0	—	—	—	—	—	
Marois, Daniel	Canada	RW	1988–1992	285	106	80	186	346	8	3	2	5	12	
Marsh, Brad	Canada	D	1988–1991	181	2	28	30	189	5	1	0	1	2	
Marsh, Gary	Canada	LW	1968–1969	1	0	0	0	0	—	—	—	—	—	
Marshall, Don	Canada	LW	1971–1972	50	2	14	16	0	1	0	0	0	0	
Marshall, Paul	Canada	LW	1980–1982	23	2	4	6	4	—	—	—	—	—	
Marshall, Willie	Canada	C	1952–1959	33	1	5	6	2	—	—	—	—	—	
Martin, Jack	Canada	C	1960–1961	1	0	0	0	0	—	—	—	—	—	
Martin, Matt	United States	D	1993–1997	76	0	5	5	71	—	—	—	—	—	
Martin, Matt	Canada	LW	2016–2018	132	8	13	21	173	6	0	2	2	6	
Martin, Terry	Canada	LW	1979–1984	317	83	76	159	152	10	2	0	2	16	
Martin, Tom	Canada	RW	1967–1968	3	1	0	1	0	—	—	—	—	—	
Masnick, Paul	Canada	C	1957–1958	41	2	9	11	14	—	—	—	—	—	
Mathers, Frank†	Canada	D	1948–1952	23	1	3	4	4	—	—	—	—	—	HHoF 1992
Matte, Joe	Canada	D	1919–1920	17	8	3	11	19	—	—	—	—	—	
**Matthews, Auston***	United States	C	2016–2026	689	428	352	780	152	68	26	33	59	13	
Matthias, Shawn	Canada	C	2015–2016	51	6	11	17	12	—	—	—	—	—	
Maxwell, Brad	Canada	D	1985–1986	52	8	18	26	108	3	0	1	1	12	
Maxwell, Wally	Canada	C	1952–1953	2	0	0	0	0	—	—	—	—	—	
May, Brad	Canada	LW	2008–2009	38	1	1	2	61	—	—	—	—	—	
Mayer, Shep	Canada	RW	1942–1943	12	1	2	3	4	—	—	—	—	—	
Mayers, Jamal	Canada	RW	2008–2010	115	9	15	24	160	—	—	—	—	—	
McAdam, Gary	Canada	LW	1985–1986	15	1	6	7	0	—	—	—	—	—	
McAllister, Chris	Canada	D	1998–2000	56	0	5	5	107	6	0	1	1	4	
McBride, Cliff	Canada	RW/D	1929–1930	1	0	0	0	0	—	—	—	—	—	
McCabe, Bryan	Canada	D	2000–2008	523	83	214	297	785	51	10	16	26	70	
**McCabe, Jake***	United States	D	2022–2026	240	16	65	81	189	31	1	6	7	16	
McCaffrey, Bert	Canada	RW/D	1924–1928	118	29	19	48	106	2	1	0	1	4	
McCauley, Alyn	Canada	C	1997–2003	304	33	49	82	52	35	5	10	15	10	
McClelland, Kevin	Canada	RW	1991–1992	18	0	1	1	33	—	—	—	—	—	
McClement, Jay	Canada	C	2012–2014	129	12	15	27	43	7	0	0	0	0	
McCormack, John	Canada	C	1947–1951	84	12	13	25	2	6	1	0	1	0	
McCourt, Dale	Canada	C	1983–1984	72	19	24	43	10	—	—	—	—	—	
McCreary Jr., Bill	United States	RW	1980–1981	12	1	0	1	4	—	—	—	—	—	
McCreedy, John†	Canada	RW	1941–1945	64	17	12	29	25	21	4	3	7	16	SC 1942, 1945
McCutcheon, Darwin	Canada	D	1981–1982	1	0	0	0	2	—	—	—	—	—	
McDonald, Jack	Canada	LW	1920–1921	6	0	0	0	2	—	—	—	—	—	
McDonald, Lanny†	Canada	RW	1973–1980	477	219	240	459	150	45	20	17	37	22	HHoF 1992
McDonald, Wilfred†	Canada	D	1938–1944	195	17	53	70	116	33	3	2	5	12	SC 1942
McGill, Bob	Canada	D	1981–1987; 1992–1993	317	4	25	29	988	12	0	0	0	35	
McIntyre, John	Canada	C	1989–1991	72	5	15	20	142	2	0	0	0	2	
McIntyre, Larry	Canada	D	1969–1973	41	0	3	3	26	—	—	—	—	—	
McKechnie, Walt	Canada	C	1978–1980	133	32	72	104	22	6	4	3	7	7	
McKegg, Greg	Canada	C	2013–2015	4	0	0	0	0	—	—	—	—	—	
McKenna, Sean	Canada	RW	1987–1990	48	5	6	11	32	2	0	0	0	0	
McKenney, Don	Canada	C	1963–1965	67	15	19	34	8	18	4	8	12	0	
McKenny, Jim	Canada	D	1965–1978	594	81	246	327	292	37	7	9	16	10	
McLaren, Frazer	Canada	LW	2012–2014	62	3	2	5	179	1	0	0	0	2	
McLean, Jack†	Canada	C/RW	1942–1945	67	14	24	38	76	13	2	2	4	8	SC 1945
McLellan, John	Canada	C	1951–1952	2	0	0	0	0	—	—	—	—	—	
McLlwain, Dave	Canada	C/RW	1991–1993	77	15	6	21	34	4	0	0	0	0	
**McMann, Bobby***	Canada	F	2022–2026	200	54	37	91	121	13	0	3	3	16	
McRae, Basil	Canada	LW	1983–1985	4	0	0	0	19	—	—	—	—	—	
McRae, Chris	Canada	LW	1987–1989	14	0	0	0	77	—	—	—	—	—	
McRae, Ken	Canada	C	1992–1994	11	1	1	2	38	6	0	0	0	4	
Meehan, Gerry	Canada	C	1968–1969	25	0	2	2	2	—	—	—	—	—	
Meeker, Howie†	Canada	RW	1946–1954	346	83	102	185	329	42	6	9	15	50	SC 1947, 1948, 1951
Meeking, Harry†	Canada	LW	1917–1919	35	17	12	29	60	2	3	0	3	6	SC 1918
Melrose, Barry	Canada	D	1980–1983	173	5	15	20	420	7	0	2	2	38	
**Mermis, Dakota***	United States	D	2024–2026	14	1	1	2	11	—	—	—	—	—	
Mete, Victor	Canada	D	2022–2023	11	0	2	2	4	—	—	—	—	—	
Metz, Don†	Canada	RW	1939–1949	172	20	35	55	42	42	7	8	15	12	SC 1942, 1945, 1947–1949
Metz, Nick†	Canada	LW	1934–1948	518	131	119	250	149	76	19	20	39	31	SC 1942, 1945, 1947, 1948
Michalek, Milan	Czech Republic	RW	2015–2017	18	2	6	8	8	—	—	—	—	—	
Mickey, Larry	Canada	RW	1968–1969	55	8	19	27	43	3	0	0	0	5	
Migay, Rudy	Canada	C	1949–1960	418	59	92	151	293	15	1	0	1	20	
Mikheyev, Ilya	Russia	F	2019–2022	146	36	36	72	36	19	2	2	4	6	
Mikol, Jim	Canada	LW/D	1962–1963	4	0	1	1	2	—	—	—	—	—	
Millar, Mike	Canada	RW	1990–1991	7	2	2	4	2	—	—	—	—	—	
Miller, Earl†	Canada	LW	1931–1932	15	3	3	6	10	7	0	0	0	0	SC 1932
Minten, Fraser	Canada	C	2023–2025	19	2	2	4	2	—	—	—	—	—	
Mitchell, John	Canada	C	2008–2011	159	20	35	55	76	—	—	—	—	—	
Mironov, Dmitri	Soviet Union; Russia	D	1991–1995	175	22	63	85	146	38	9	12	21	10	
Modin, Fredrik	Sweden	LW	1996–1999	217	38	38	76	91	8	0	0	0	6	
Moffat, Lyle	Canada	LW	1972–1975	23	2	7	9	13	—	—	—	—	—	
Mogilny, Alexander	Russia	RW	2001–2004	176	65	101	166	32	39	15	9	24	20	
Momesso, Sergio	Canada	LW	1995–1996	54	7	8	15	112	—	—	—	—	—	
Monahan, Garry	Canada	LW	1970–1975	375	55	80	135	274	15	2	1	3	9	
Moore, Dickie†	Canada	LW	1964–1965	38	2	4	6	68	5	1	1	2	6	HHoF 1974
Moore, Dominic	Canada	C	2007–2009; 2017–2018	151	22	45	67	99	2	0	0	0	0	
Moore, Trevor	United States	LW	2018–2020	67	8	10	18	8	7	1	0	1	0	
Moro, Marc	Canada	D	2001–2002	2	0	0	0	2	—	—	—	—	—	
Morris, Elwyn†	Canada	D	1943–1946	117	13	28	41	50	18	4	2	6	16	SC 1945
Morrison, Jim	Canada	D	1951–1958	399	23	87	110	358	16	0	1	1	12	
Mortson, Gus	Canada	D	1946–1952	371	21	71	92	709	47	4	7	11	62	
Mueller, Marcel	Germany	LW	2010–2011	3	0	0	0	2	—	—	—	—	—	
Mulhern, Richard	Canada	D	1979–1980	26	0	10	10	11	1	0	0	0	0	
Muller, Kirk	Canada	LW	1995–1997	102	29	33	62	127	6	3	2	5	0	
Mummery, Harry†	United States	D	1917–1919	31	5	3	8	71	2	1	1	2	17	SC 1918
Muni, Craig	Canada	D	1981–1986	19	0	2	2	6	—	—	—	—	—	
Munro, Gerald	Canada	D	1925–1926	4	0	0	0	0	—	—	—	—	—	
Murphy, Larry†	Canada	D	1995–1997	151	19	81	100	54	6	0	2	2	4	HHoF 2004
Murray, Ken	Canada	D	1969–1971	5	0	1	1	2	—	—	—	—	—	
Murray, Randy	Canada	D	1969–1970	3	0	0	0	2	—	—	—	—	—	
Muzzin, Jake	Canada	D	2018–2023	187	18	63	81	101	22	4	4	8	6	
**Myers, Philippe***	Canada	D	2024–2026	75	2	5	7	37	—	—	—	—	—	
Nattress, Ric	Canada	D	1991–1992	36	2	14	16	32	—	—	—	—	—	
Nedved, Zdenek	Czech Republic	RW	1994–1997	31	4	6	10	14	—	—	—	—	—	
Neely, Bob	Canada	LW/D	1973–1978	261	36	53	89	264	26	5	7	12	15	
Nelson, Gord	Canada	D	1969–1970	3	0	0	0	11	—	—	—	—	—	
Nesterenko, Eric	Canada	RW	1951–1956	206	43	36	79	261	9	0	2	2	15	
Neville, Mike	Canada	C	1924–1926	46	4	5	9	12	2	0	0	0	0	
Nevin, Bob†	Canada	RW	1957–1964	250	55	100	155	55	27	6	4	10	10	SC 1962, 1963
Newbury, Kris	Canada	C	2006–2009	44	3	3	6	60	—	—	—	—	—	
Nieuwendyk, Joe†	Canada	C	2003–2004	64	22	28	50	26	9	6	0	6	4	HHoF 2011
Nighbor, Frank†	Canada	C	1929–1930	22	2	0	2	2	—	—	—	—	—	HHoF 1947
Nigro, Frank	Canada	C	1982–1984	68	8	18	26	39	3	0	0	0	2	
Noble, Reg†	Canada	C/D	1917–1925	160	125	59	184	329	6	1	1	2	21	SC 1918, 1922; HHoF 1962
Noesen, Stefan	United States	RW	2020–2021	1	0	0	0	0	—	—	—	—	—	
Nolan, Owen	Canada	C	2002–2004	79	26	34	60	126	7	0	2	2	2	
Nolan, Patrick	Canada	LW/D	1921–1922	2	0	0	0	0	—	—	—	—	—	
Nykoluk, Mike	Canada	RW	1956–1957	32	3	1	4	20	—	—	—	—	—	
Nylander, Alexander	Sweden	LW	2024–2025	5	0	0	0	4	—	—	—	—	—	
**Nylander, William***	Sweden	C	2015–2026	750	292	399	691	200	67	26	32	58	22	
Nylund, Gary	Canada	D	1982–1986	218	7	50	57	398	10	0	2	2	25	
O'Byrne, Ryan	Canada	D	2012–2013	8	1	1	2	6	6	0	0	0	2	
O'Flaherty, Gerry	United States	LW	1971–1972	2	0	0	0	0	—	—	—	—	—	
O'Neill, Jeff	Canada	RW	2005–2007	148	39	41	80	118	—	—	—	—	—	
O'Neill, Tom	Canada	RW	1943–1945	66	10	12	22	53	4	0	0	0	6	
O'Reilly, Ryan	Canada	C	2022–2023	13	4	7	11	6	11	3	6	9	5	
Olczyk, Ed	United States	C	1987–1991	257	116	151	267	221	11	6	6	12	16	
Oliver, Murray	Canada	C	1967–1970	226	44	90	134	50	4	1	2	3	0	
Olmstead, Bert†	Canada	LW	1958–1962	246	56	109	165	231	29	8	9	17	23	SC 1962; HHoF 1985
Ondrus, Ben	Canada	RW	2005–2009	52	0	2	2	77	—	—	—	—	—	
Oreskovic, Phil	Canada	D	2008–2009	10	1	1	2	21	—	—	—	—	—	
Orr, Colton	Canada	RW	2009–2015	232	8	5	13	637	7	0	0	0	18	
Osborne, Mark	Canada	LW	1986–1991; 1991–1994	426	94	160	254	563	57	9	12	21	102	
Osburn, Randy	Canada	LW	1972–1973	26	0	2	2	0	—	—	—	—	—	
Ozhiganov, Igor	Russia	D	2018–2019	53	3	4	7	14	—	—	—	—	—	
Pacioretty, Max	United States	LW	2024–2025	37	5	8	13	16	11	3	5	8	4	
Paiement, Wilf	Canada	RW	1979–1982	187	78	125	203	420	6	0	2	2	19	
Panik, Richard	Slovakia	RW	2014–2015	76	11	6	17	49	—	—	—	—	—	
Pappin, Jim†	Canada	RW	1963–1968	223	54	46	100	200	23	7	8	15	12	SC 1964, 1967
Parenteau, P. A.	Canada	LW	2015–2016	77	20	21	41	68	—	—	—	—	—	
Parise, J. P.	Canada	LW	1967–1968	1	0	1	1	0	—	—	—	—	—	
Parsons, George	Canada	LW	1936–1939	78	12	13	25	20	7	3	2	5	11	
Patterson, George	Canada	LW/RW	1926–1928	29	4	3	7	31	—	—	—	—	—	
Pearson, Rob	Canada	RW	1991–1994	192	49	42	91	458	28	3	2	5	63	
Pearson, Scott	Canada	LW	1988–1991; 1996–1997	63	5	11	16	114	2	2	0	2	10	
Peca, Michael	Canada	C	2006–2007	35	4	11	15	60	—	—	—	—	—	
Pederson, Tom	United States	D	1996–1997	15	1	2	3	9	—	—	—	—	—	
Percy, Stuart	Canada	D	2014–2016	12	0	3	3	2	—	—	—	—	—	
Pelyk, Mike	Canada	D	1967–1974; 1976–1978	441	26	88	114	566	40	0	3	3	41	
Perlini, Fred	Canada	C	1981–1984	8	2	3	5	0	—	—	—	—	—	
Perreault, Yanic	Canada	C	1993–1994; 1998–2001; 2006–2007	176	54	69	123	90	29	5	10	15	10	
Perrott, Nathan	Canada	RW	2003–2006	43	1	2	3	118	—	—	—	—	—	
Petan, Nic	Canada	C	2018–2021	28	1	4	5	8	—	—	—	—	—	
Petit, Michel	Canada	D	1990–1992	88	10	32	42	377	—	—	—	—	—	
Pettinger, Eric	Canada	LW/C	1928–1930	68	7	12	19	64	4	1	0	1	8	
**Pezzetta, Michael***	Canada	C	2025–2026	9	0	0	0	35	—	—	—	—	—	
Phaneuf, Dion	Canada	D	2009–2016	423	45	151	196	598	7	1	2	3	6	
Picard, Robert	Canada	D	1980–1981	59	6	19	25	68	—	—	—	—	—	
Pilar, Karel	Czech Republic	D	2001–2004	90	6	24	30	42	12	1	4	5	12	
Pilote, Pierre†	Canada	D	1968–1969	69	3	18	21	46	4	0	1	1	4	HHoF 1975
Plante, Cam	Canada	D	1984–1985	2	0	0	0	0	—	—	—	—	—	
Plekanec, Tomas	Czech Republic	C	2017–2018	17	0	2	2	6	7	2	2	4	2	
Poddubny, Walt	Canada	LW	1981–1986	186	59	86	145	178	13	7	2	9	4	
Podollan, Jason	Canada	RW	1996–1999	14	0	3	3	6	—	—	—	—	—	
Pohl, John	United States	C	2005–2008	114	17	21	38	24	—	—	—	—	—	
Poile, Bud†	Canada	RW	1942–1948	131	44	52	96	52	13	4	4	8	6	HHoF 1990; SC 1947
Polak, Roman	Czech Republic	D	2014–2016; 2016–2018	240	12	33	45	215	9	0	1	1	4	
Ponikarovsky, Alexei	Ukraine	LW	2000–2010	477	114	143	257	318	23	1	3	4	12	
Pratt, Tracy	United States	D	1976–1977	11	0	1	1	8	4	0	0	0	0	
Pratt, Walter†	Canada	D	1942–1946	181	52	108	160	149	24	3	9	12	20	HHoF 1966; SC 1945
Prentice, Eric	Canada	LW	1943–1944	5	0	0	0	4	—	—	—	—	—	
Presley, Wayne	United States	RW	1995–1996	19	2	2	4	14	5	0	0	0	2	
Price, Noel	Canada	D	1957–1959	29	0	0	0	9	5	0	0	0	2	
Primeau, Joe†	Canada	C	1927–1936	310	66	177	243	105	38	5	18	23	12	HHoF 1963; SC 1932
Primeau, Wayne	Canada	C	2009–2010	59	3	5	8	35	—	—	—	—	—	
Prochazka, Martin	Czech Republic	RW	1997–1998	29	2	4	6	8	—	—	—	—	—	
Prodgers, George	Canada	C	1919–1920	16	8	6	14	4	—	—	—	—	—	
Pronovost, Marcel†	Canada	D	1965–1970	223	8	40	48	134	16	1	0	1	14	HHoF 1978; SC 1967
Pudas, Albert	Canada	LW/RW	1926–1927	4	0	0	0	0	—	—	—	—	—	
Pulford, Bob†	Canada	LW	1956–1970	947	251	312	563	691	89	25	26	51	126	HHoF 1991; SC 1962–1964, 1967
Quenneville, Joel	Canada	D	1978–1980	93	3	13	16	84	6	0	1	1	4	
**Quillan, Jacob***	Canada	F	2024–2026	24	1	2	3	2	—	—	—	—	—	
Quinn, Pat†	Canada	D	1968–1970	99	2	12	14	183	4	0	0	0	13	HHoF 2016
Ramage, Rob	Canada	D	1989–1991	160	18	66	84	375	5	1	2	3	20	
Ramsay, Beattie	Canada	D	1927–1928	43	0	2	2	10	—	—	—	—	—	
Randall, Ken†	Canada	RW/D	1917–1923	127	49	32	81	329	6	2	1	3	27	SC 1918, 1922
Reaume, Marc	Canada	D	1954–1960	267	8	39	47	257	19	0	2	2	8	
Reaves, Ryan	Canada	RW	2023–2025	84	4	4	8	77	5	0	1	1	2	
Regan, Larry	Canada	RW	1958–1961	116	11	42	53	10	22	4	4	8	2	
Reichel, Robert	Czech Republic	C	2001–2004	228	43	80	123	82	37	2	6	8	12	
Reid, Dave	Canada	C	1952–1956	7	0	0	0	0	—	—	—	—	—	
Reid, Dave	Canada	LW	1988–1991	216	33	53	86	49	3	0	0	0	0	
Reid, Reg	Canada	LW	1924–1926	39	1	0	1	4	2	0	0	0	0	
Renberg, Mikael	Sweden	RW	2001–2004	197	40	72	112	122	12	1	0	1	14	
Reynolds, Bobby	United States	LW	1989–1990	7	1	1	2	0	—	—	—	—	—	
Ribble, Pat	Canada	D	1979–1980	13	0	2	2	8	—	—	—	—	—	
Richardson, Luke	Canada	D	1987–1991	299	11	39	50	597	7	0	0	0	22	
Ridley, Mike	Canada	C	1994–1995	48	10	27	37	14	7	3	1	4	2	
**Rielly, Morgan***	Canada	D	2013–2026	951	98	451	549	279	70	15	32	47	35	
**Rifai, Marshall***	Canada	D	2023–2026	3	0	0	0	0	—	—	—	—	—	
Ritchie, Dave	Canada	D	1918–1919	4	0	0	0	9	—	—	—	—	—	
Ritchie, Nick	Canada	LW	2021–2022	33	2	7	9	23	—	—	—	—	—	
Roach, Mickey	United States	C	1919–1921	30	12	3	15	6	—	—	—	—	—	
Robert, Rene	Canada	RW	1970–1971; 1980–1982	74	19	31	50	45	3	0	2	2	2	
Roberts, Gary	Canada	LW	2000–2004	237	83	74	157	266	50	14	26	40	74	
Robertson, Fred†	Canada	D	1931–1934	10	0	0	0	23	7	0	0	0	0	SC 1932
**Robertson, Nicholas***	United States	LW	2020–2026	234	48	40	88	34	13	2	1	3	8	
Robidas, Stephane	Canada	D	2014–2016	52	1	6	7	34	—	—	—	—	—	
Rodden, Eddie	Canada	C	1927–1928	25	3	6	9	36	—	—	—	—	—	
Romnes, Elwin	United States	LW/C	1938–1939	36	7	16	23	0	10	1	4	5	0	
Root, Bill	Canada	D	1984–1987	96	4	5	9	89	20	1	2	3	25	
Rosehill, Jay	Canada	LW	2009–2012	72	2	3	5	198	—	—	—	—	—	
Rosen, Calle	Sweden	D	2017–2020	12	1	2	3	4	—	—	—	—	—	
Rouse, Bob	Canada	D	1990–1994	237	13	45	58	338	39	3	11	14	38	
**Roy, Nicolas***	Canada	C	2025–2026	59	5	15	20	10	—	—	—	—	—	
Rubins, Kristians	Latvia	D	2021–2022	3	0	0	0	4	—	—	—	—	—	
Rupp, Duane	Canada	D	1964–1968	78	1	9	10	42	—	—	—	—	—	
Rychel, Warren	Canada	LW	1994–1995	26	1	6	7	101	3	0	0	0	0	
Sabourin, Scott	Canada	F	2020–2021	1	0	0	0	5	—	—	—	—	—	
Salming, Borje†	Sweden	D	1973–1989	1,099	148	620	768	1,292	81	12	37	49	91	HHoF 1996
Samis, Phil†	Canada	D	1947–1950	2	0	0	0	0	5	0	1	1	2	SC 1948
Sandin, Rasmus	Sweden	D	2019–2023	140	10	38	48	37	5	1	0	1	0	
Sands, Charlie	Canada	C/RW	1932–1934	48	8	11	19	2	14	3	2	5	2	
Santorelli, Mike	Canada	C	2014–2015	57	11	18	29	8	—	—	—	—	—	
Schenn, Luke	Canada	D	2008–2012; 2022–2023	325	15	61	76	230	11	0	1	1	11	
Schneider, Mathieu	United States	D	1995–1998	115	18	38	56	74	6	0	4	4	8	
Schriner, David†	Canada	LW	1939–1946	244	109	83	192	75	46	14	10	24	22	HHoF 1962; SC 1942, 1945
Schutt, Rod	Canada	LW	1985–1986	6	0	0	0	0	—	—	—	—	—	
Scott, Ganton	Canada	RW	1922–1924	21	0	0	0	0	—	—	—	—	—	
Secord, Al	Canada	LW	1987–1989	114	20	37	57	292	6	1	0	1	16	
Sedlbauer, Ron	Canada	LW	1980–1981	21	10	4	14	14	2	0	1	1	2	
Seiling, Rod	Canada	D	1962–1963; 1974–1976	138	8	29	37	86	17	0	1	1	6	
Selby, Brit	Canada	LW	1964–1967; 1968–1971	169	29	30	59	93	8	0	0	0	4	
Selwood, Brad	Canada	D	1970–1972	100	6	27	33	71	5	0	0	0	4	
Semenko, Dave	Canada	LW	1987–1988	70	2	3	5	107	—	—	—	—	—	
Semyonov, Kirill	Russia	C	2021–2022	3	0	0	0	0	—	—	—	—	—	
Seney, Brett	Canada	LW	2021–2022	2	0	0	0	0	—	—	—	—	—	
Serowik, Jeff	United States	D	1990–1991	1	0	0	0	0	—	—	—	—	—	
Shack, Eddie†	Canada	LW	1960–1967; 1973–1975	504	99	96	195	676	57	6	3	9	107	SC 1962–1964, 1967
Shand, David	Canada	D	1980–1983	48	0	5	5	62	7	1	0	1	13	
Shannon, Darryl	Canada	D	1988–1993	98	3	13	16	52	—	—	—	—	—	
Shay, Normand	Canada	D/RW	1925–1926	22	3	1	4	18	—	—	—	—	—	
Shedden, Doug	Canada	C	1988–1991	24	8	10	18	12	—	—	—	—	—	
Shill, Jack	Canada	C	1933–1934; 1935–1937	42	4	6	10	26	13	0	3	3	8	
Shore, Nick	United States	C	2019	21	2	1	3	12	—	—	—	—	—	
Sifers, Jaime	Canada	D	2008–2009	23	0	2	2	18	—	—	—	—	—	
Sill, Zach	Canada	C	2014–2015	21	0	1	1	24	—	—	—	—	—	
Simmonds, Wayne	Canada	RW	2020–2023	128	12	15	27	190	9	0	1	1	16	
Sittler, Darryl†	Canada	C	1970–1982	844	389	527	916	763	64	25	40	65	120	HHoF 1989
Sjostrom, Fredrik	Sweden	RW	2009–2011	85	4	6	10	18	—	—	—	—	—	
Skinner, Alf†	Canada	RW	1917–1919	37	25	9	34	54	2	0	1	1	9	SC 1918
Sloan, Tod†	Canada	C/RW	1947–1958	549	162	184	346	650	26	5	6	11	39	SC 1951
Sly, Darryl	Canada	D	1965–1968	19	0	0	0	4	—	—	—	—	—	
Smedsmo, Dale	United States	LW	1972–1973	4	0	0	0	0	—	—	—	—	—	
Smith, Art	Canada	D	1927–1930	101	13	6	19	188	4	1	1	2	8	
Smith, Ben	United States	RW	2015–2017	52	4	6	10	4	—	—	—	—	—	
Smith, Brad	Canada	RW	1985–1987	89	10	24	34	256	17	3	2	5	44	
Smith, D. J.	Canada	D	1996–1997; 1999–2000	11	0	1	1	12	—	—	—	—	—	
Smith, Floyd	Canada	RW	1967–1970	131	25	34	59	35	4	0	0	0	0	
Smith, George	Canada	D	1921–1922	9	0	0	0	0	—	—	—	—	—	
Smith, Jason	Canada	D	1996–1999	162	5	29	34	156	—	—	—	—	—	
Smith, Sid†	Canada	LW	1946–1958	601	186	183	369	94	44	17	10	27	2	SC 1948, 1949, 1951
Smith, Trevor	Canada	C	2013–2015	82	6	8	14	16	—	—	—	—	—	
Smyth, Greg	Canada	D	1993–1994; 1996–1997	13	0	1	1	38	—	—	—	—	—	
Snell, Chris	Canada	D	1993–1994	2	0	0	0	2	—	—	—	—	—	
Solinger, Bob	Canada	LW/RW	1951–1955	98	10	11	21	19	—	—	—	—	—	
Soshnikov, Nikita	Russia	RW	2015–2018	70	7	7	14	22	—	—	—	—	—	
Spaling, Nick	Canada	C	2015–2016	35	1	6	7	18	—	—	—	—	—	
Spence, Gord	Canada	LW	1925–1926	3	0	0	0	0	—	—	—	—	—	
Spencer, Brian	Canada	LW	1969–1972	95	10	20	30	192	6	0	1	1	17	
Speyer, Chris	Canada	D	1923–1925	5	0	0	0	0	—	—	—	—	—	
Spezza, Jason	Canada	C	2019–2022	183	31	49	80	50	17	3	3	6	15	
Spring, Jesse	United States	D	1926–1927	2	0	0	0	0	—	—	—	—	—	
Stackhouse, Ted†	Canada	D	1921–1922	13	0	0	0	2	1	0	0	0	0	SC 1922
Stajan, Matt	Canada	C	2002–2010	445	87	136	223	247	3	0	0	0	2	
Stalberg, Viktor	Sweden	RW	2009–2010	40	9	5	14	30	—	—	—	—	—	
Stamler, Lorne	Canada	LW	1978–1979	45	4	3	7	2	—	—	—	—	—	
Stanley, Allan†	Canada	D	1958–1969	633	47	186	233	318	85	4	28	32	66	HHoF 1981; SC 1962–1964, 1967
Stanowski, Wally†	Canada	D	1939–1948	282	20	74	94	106	60	3	14	17	13	SC 1942, 1945, 1947, 1948
Stapleton, Tim	United States	C	2008–2009	4	1	0	1	0	—	—	—	—	—	
Stastny, Marian	Czechoslovakia	RW	1985–1986	70	23	30	53	21	3	0	0	0	0	
**Stecher, Troy***	Canada	D	2025–2026	58	3	11	14	12	—	—	—	—	—	
Steckel, Dave	United States	C	2011–2013	89	8	6	14	10	—	—	—	—	—	
Steen, Alexander	Sweden	C	2005–2009	253	50	76	126	106	—	—	—	—	—	
Steeves, Alex	United States	F	2021–2025	14	1	2	3	0	—	—	—	—	—	
Stemkowski, Pete	Canada	C	1963–1968	221	29	64	93	247	22	5	7	12	53	
Stempniak, Lee	United States	RW	2008–2010	123	25	36	61	49	—	—	—	—	—	
Stephenson, Bob	Canada	RW	1979–1980	14	2	2	4	4	—	—	—	—	—	
Stewart, Bill	Canada	D	1983–1985	83	2	19	21	148	—	—	—	—	—	
Stevens, Mike	Canada	LW	1989–1990	1	0	0	0	0	—	—	—	—	—	
Stewart, Gaye†	Canada	LW	1942–1948	165	81	52	133	43	16	2	7	9	12	SC 1942, 1947
Stewart, Ron†	Canada	RW	1952–1965	838	186	182	368	413	82	10	18	28	56	SC 1962–1964
Stothers, Mike	Canada	D	1987–1988	18	0	1	1	42	—	—	—	—	—	
Stoughton, Blaine	Canada	RW	1974–1976	121	29	25	54	32	7	4	2	6	2	
Stralman, Anton	Sweden	D	2007–2009	88	4	18	22	38	—	—	—	—	—	
Strong, Ken	Canada	LW	1982–1985	15	2	2	4	6	—	—	—	—	—	
Stuart, Bill†	Canada	D	1920–1925	94	16	15	31	60	4	1	1	2	0	SC 1922
Suglobov, Aleksander	Russia	RW	2005–2007	16	0	0	0	4	—	—	—	—	—	
Sullivan, Frank	Canada	D	1949–1950; 1952–1953	6	0	0	0	2	—	—	—	—	—	
Sullivan, Steve	Canada	RW	1996–2000	154	35	50	85	95	13	3	3	6	14	
Sundin, Mats†	Sweden	C	1994–2008	981	420	567	987	748	77	32	38	70	66	HHoF 2012
Sutherland, Bill	Canada	C	1968–1969	44	7	5	12	14	—	—	—	—	—	
Sutter, Rich	Canada	RW	1994–1995	18	0	3	3	10	4	0	0	0	2	
Svehla, Robert	Slovakia	D	2002–2003	82	7	38	45	46	7	0	3	3	2	
Svoboda, Petr	Czech Republic	D	2000–2001	18	1	2	3	10	—	—	—	—	—	
Sykes, Bob	Canada	LW	1974–1975	2	0	0	0	0	—	—	—	—	—	
**Tanev, Chris***	Canada	D	2024–2026	86	3	17	20	24	13	1	2	3	2	
**Tavares, John***	Canada	C	2018–2026	597	253	311	564	242	51	17	14	31	18	
Taylor, Billy†	Canada	C	1939–1946	222	66	118	184	60	28	5	13	18	9	SC 1942
Taylor, Harry†	Canada	C	1946–1949	51	4	9	13	30	1	0	0	0	0	SC 1949
Terrion, Greg	Canada	LW	1982–1988	427	66	103	169	217	32	1	9	10	37	
Thibaudeau, Gilles	Canada	C	1989–1991	41	9	18	27	17	—	—	—	—	—	
Thomas, Cy	Canada	LW/RW	1947–1948	8	1	2	3	4	—	—	—	—	—	
Thomas, Steve	Canada	LW	1984–1987; 1998–2001	377	118	173	291	299	53	26	20	46	48	
Thompson, Errol	Canada	LW	1970–1978	365	126	119	245	70	27	5	4	9	9	
Thoms, Bill	Canada	C	1932–1939	279	68	92	160	115	39	6	9	15	4	
Thomson, Jimmy†	Canada	D	1945–1957	717	15	208	223	845	63	2	13	15	135	SC 1947–1949, 1951
Thomson, Rhys	Canada	D	1942–1943	18	0	2	2	22	—	—	—	—	—	
Thornton, Joe	Canada	C	2020–2021	44	5	15	20	14	7	1	0	1	2	
Thornton, Scott	Canada	LW	1990–1991	33	1	3	4	30	—	—	—	—	—	
**Thrun, Henry***	United States	D	2025–2026	4	0	0	0	0	—	—	—	—	—	
Timashov, Dmytro	Sweden	LW	2019–2020	44	4	5	9	16	—	—	—	—	—	
Timgren, Ray†	Canada	LW	1948–1955	237	13	43	56	68	30	3	9	12	6	SC 1949, 1951
Timmins, Conor	Canada	D	2022–2025	101	5	27	32	50	—	—	—	—	—	
Tlusty, Jiri	Czech Republic	C	2007–2010	74	10	10	20	14	—	—	—	—	—	
Tomlinson, Dave	Canada	C	1991–1993	6	0	0	0	4	—	—	—	—	—	
Toporowski, Shayne	Canada	RW	1996–1997	3	0	0	0	7	—	—	—	—	—	
Tremblay, Yannick	Canada	D	1996–1999	78	4	11	15	22	—	—	—	—	—	
Trottier, Guy	Canada	RW	1970–1972	113	28	17	45	37	9	1	0	1	16	
Tucker, Darcy	Canada	RW	1999–2008	531	148	171	319	756	58	10	11	21	79	
Turnbull, Ian	Canada	D	1973–1982	580	112	302	414	651	55	13	32	45	94	
**Tverberg, Ryan***	Canada	C	2025–2026	2	0	0	0	2	—	—	—	—	—	
Ullman, Norm†	Canada	C	1967–1975	535	166	305	471	160	26	3	6	9	6	HHoF 1982
Unger, Garry	Canada	C	1967–1968	15	1	1	2	4	—	—	—	—	—	
Vaive, Rick	Canada	RW	1979–1987	534	299	238	537	940	32	14	9	23	53	
Valiquette, Jack	Canada	C	1974–1978	172	33	66	99	52	23	3	6	9	4	
Valk, Garry	Canada	RW	1998–2001	287	31	63	94	171	45	6	6	12	42	
Valiev, Rinat	Russia	D	2015–2017	10	0	0	0	0	—	—	—	—	—	
Van Riemsdyk, James	United States	LW	2012–2018	413	154	140	294	192	20	7	7	14	8	
Van Ryn, Mike	Canada	D	2008–2009	27	3	8	11	14	—	—	—	—	—	
Veitch, Darren	Canada	D	1988–1991	39	3	8	11	16	—	—	—	—	—	
Versteeg, Kris	Canada	RW	2010–2011	53	14	21	35	29	—	—	—	—	—	
Verstraete, Leigh	Canada	RW	1982–1983; 1984–1985; 1987–1988	8	0	1	1	14	—	—	—	—	—	
Vesey, Jimmy	United States	LW	2020–2021	30	5	2	7	4	—	—	—	—	—	
**Villeneuve, William***	Canada	D	2025–2026	3	0	0	0	0	—	—	—	—	—	
Voss, Carl†	United States	C	1926–1927; 1928–1929	14	0	0	0	0	—	—	—	—	—	HHoF 1974
Walker, Kurt	United States	D	1975–1978	71	4	5	9	142	16	0	0	0	34	
Wallin, Rickard	Sweden	C	2009–2010	60	2	7	9	20	—	—	—	—	—	
Walton, Mike†	Canada	C	1965–1971	257	84	107	191	184	16	4	3	7	2	SC 1967
Ward, Dixon	Canada	RW	1994–1995	22	0	3	3	31	—	—	—	—	—	
Ward, Ron	Canada	C	1969–1970	18	0	1	1	2	—	—	—	—	—	
Ware, Jeff	Canada	D	1996–1998	15	0	0	0	6	—	—	—	—	—	
Warner, Bob	Canada	D	1975–1977	10	1	1	2	4	4	0	0	0	0	
Warriner, Todd	Canada	LW	1994–2000	253	36	48	84	117	15	1	1	2	4	
Watson, Harry†	Canada	LW	1946–1955	500	163	122	285	111	50	14	9	23	27	SC 1947–1949, 1951
Webster, Don	Canada	LW	1943–1944	27	7	6	13	28	5	0	0	0	12	
Weir, Stan	Canada	C	1975–1978	159	42	56	98	40	29	6	5	11	0	
Wellwood, Kyle	Canada	C	2003–2008	189	31	77	108	14	—	—	—	—	—	
Wesley, Glen	Canada	D	2002–2003	7	0	3	3	4	5	0	1	1	2	
Westrum, Erik	United States	C	2006–2007	2	0	0	0	0	—	—	—	—	—	
White, Ian	Canada	D	2005–2010	296	28	77	105	190	—	—	—	—	—	
White, Peter	Canada	C	1995–1996	1	0	0	0	0	—	—	—	—	—	
Willard, Rod	Canada	LW	1982–1983	1	0	0	0	0	—	—	—	—	—	
Williams, Jeremy	Canada	RW	2005–2009	31	9	2	11	6	—	—	—	—	—	
Williams, Tiger	Canada	LW	1974–1980	407	109	132	241	1,670	44	5	11	16	240	
Wilm, Clarke	Canada	C	2003–2006	70	1	7	8	50	5	0	1	1	2	
Wilson, Carol	Canada	RW	1919–1921	31	22	9	31	108	—	—	—	—	—	
Wilson, Johnny	Canada	LW	1959–1961	73	15	17	32	8	10	1	2	3	2	
Wilson, Ron	Canada	D	1977–1980	64	7	15	22	6	6	1	3	4	2	
Winnik, Daniel	Canada	C/LW	2014–2015; 2015–2016	114	11	28	39	35	—	—	—	—	—	
Wiseman, Brian	Canada	C	1996–1997	3	0	0	0	0	—	—	—	—	—	
Wolanin, Craig	United States	D	1996–1998	33	0	4	4	19	—	—	—	—	—	
Wood, Randy	United States	LW/C	1994–1996	94	20	20	40	70	7	2	0	2	6	
Wozniewski, Andy	United States	D	2005–2008	76	2	10	12	81	—	—	—	—	—	
Wren, Bob	Canada	C	2001–2002	1	0	0	0	0	1	0	0	0	0	
Yake, Terry	Canada	C	1994–1995	19	3	2	5	2	—	—	—	—	—	
Yakushkin, Dmitriy	Ukraine	D	1999–2000	2	0	0	0	2	—	—	—	—	—	
Yaremchuk, Gary	Canada	C	1981–1985	34	1	4	5	28	—	—	—	—	—	
Yaremchuk, Ken	Canada	C	1986–1989	47	6	13	19	28	12	0	2	2	10	
Yushkevich, Dmitri	Russia	D	1995–2002	506	25	110	135	409	44	2	10	12	38	
Zaitsev, Nikita	Russia	D	2016–2019	223	12	51	63	87	18	0	2	2	4	
Zanussi, Ron	Canada	RW	1980–1982	55	3	8	11	20	3	0	0	0	0	
Zettler, Rob	Canada	D	1995–1998	136	2	20	22	207	2	0	0	0	0	
Zezel, Peter	Canada	C	1990–1994	207	50	78	128	73	38	4	5	9	14	
Zigomanis, Michael	Canada	C	2010–2011	8	0	1	1	4	—	—	—	—	—	
Zohorna, Radim	Czech Republic	F	2022–2023	2	1	0	1	0	—	—	—	—	—	
