= 1946 Memorial Cup =

Canadian junior ice hockey championship

The Memorial Cup trophy

The 1946 Memorial Cup final was the 28th junior ice hockey championship of the Canadian Amateur Hockey Association. The George Richardson Memorial Trophy champions Toronto St. Michael's Majors of the Ontario Hockey Association in Eastern Canada competed against the Abbott Cup champions Winnipeg Monarchs of the Manitoba Junior Hockey League in Western Canada. In a best-of-seven series, held at Maple Leaf Gardens in Toronto, Ontario, Winnipeg won their 3rd Memorial Cup, defeating St. Michael's 4 games to 3.

== Scores ==
- Game 1: Winnipeg 3-2 St. Michael's
- Game 2: St. Michael's 5-3 Winnipeg
- Game 3: St. Michael's 7-3 Winnipeg
- Game 4: Winnipeg 4-3 St. Michael's
- Game 5: St. Michael's 7-4 Winnipeg
- Game 6: Winnipeg 4-2 St. Michael's
- Game 7: Winnipeg 4-2 St. Michael's

== Winning roster ==
Clint Albright, Hy Beatty, Al Buchanan, Ted Chitty, Dunc Daniels, Gord Fashoway, Jack Gibson, Tank Kummerfield, Eddie Marchant, Laurie May, Red McRae, Cam Millar, George Robertson, Tom Rockey, Gord Scott, Harry Taylor, Bill Tindall. Coach: Walter Monson
