= Cam Millar =

Cam Millar may refer to:

- Cam Millar (Canadian sportsman) (1927–2020), Canadian athlete
- Cam Millar (rugby union) (born 2002), New Zealand rugby union player

== See also ==
- Cam Miller (born 2001), American football player
- Cam Miller (cornerback)
- Cameron Miller, member of the Nevada Assembly
