= Clint Albright =

Canadian ice hockey player

- Born: February 28, 1926 Winnipeg, Manitoba, Canada
- Died: December 30, 1999 (aged 73)
- Height: 6 ft 2 in (188 cm)
- Weight: 180 lb (82 kg; 12 st 12 lb)
- Position: Centre
- Shot: Left
- Played for: New York Rangers
- Playing career: 1948–1951

Clinton Howard "The Professor" Albright (February 28, 1926 – December 30, 1999) was a Canadian professional ice hockey centre. Born in Winnipeg, Manitoba, Albright played 59 games in the National Hockey League (NHL) for the New York Rangers in the 1948–49 season, wearing the number fifteen on his jersey. He was one of few players to wear glasses on the ice.

== Playing career ==
Albright played junior hockey for the Winnipeg Monarchs, and twice went to the Memorial Cup with them, winning the tournament in 1946. At the University of Manitoba to study mechanical engineering, Albright played for the university team, and also played for the Allan Cup with the Winnipeg Flyers. After his single season with the Rangers, Albright returned to school to complete his degree, and was out of hockey all together by 1954.

== Career statistics ==
=== Regular season and playoffs ===
			Regular season					Playoffs
Season	Team	League	GP	G	A	Pts	PIM	GP	G	A	Pts	PIM
1944–45	Winnipeg Monarchs	MJHL	8	10	6	16	8	8	9	6	15	4
1944–45	Winnipeg Monarchs	M-Cup	—	—	—	—	—	9	5	3	8	18
1945–46	Winnipeg Monarchs	MJHL	6	5	3	8	12	7	6	1	7	9
1945–46	Winnipeg Monarchs	M-Cup	—	—	—	—	—	15	6	5	11	10
1946–47	University of Manitoba	WSrHL	4	8	7	15	0	—	—	—	—	—
1946–47	Winnipeg Flyers	MHL	10	11	6	17	16	5	6	0	6	8
1946–47	Winnipeg Flyers	Al-Cup	—	—	—	—	—	7	3	2	5	7
1947–48	Winnipeg Flyers	MHL	16	17	12	29	21	7	2	3	5	7
1947–48	Winnipeg Flyers	Al-Cup	—	—	—	—	—	1	0	0	0	0
1948–49	New York Rangers	NHL	59	14	5	19	19	—	—	—	—	—
1950–51	St. Paul Saints	USHL	62	21	19	40	36	4	1	1	2	4
1953–54	Trail Smoke Eaters	WIHL	8	0	2	2	0	—	—	—	—	—
NHL totals			59	14	5	19	19	—	—	—	—	—

== Awards and achievements ==
- Memorial Cup Championships (1946)
