= Harry Taylor (ice hockey) =

Canadian ice hockey player

- Born: March 28, 1926 St. James, Manitoba, Canada
- Died: November 16, 2009 (aged 83) Sidney, British Columbia, Canada
- Height: 5 ft 8 in (173 cm)
- Weight: 165 lb (75 kg; 11 st 11 lb)
- Position: Centre
- Shot: Right
- Played for: Toronto Maple Leafs; Chicago Black Hawks
- Playing career: 1944–1958

Harold Taylor (March 28, 1926 – November 16, 2009) was a professional ice hockey player who played 66 games in the National Hockey League with the Toronto Maple Leafs and Chicago Black Hawks between 1946 and 1952, winning the Stanley Cup in 1949 with Toronto. The rest of his career, which lasted from 1944 to 1958, was spent in the minor leagues. Taylor was born in St. James, Manitoba in 1926 and died in Sidney, British Columbia 2009.

== Career statistics ==
=== Regular season and playoffs ===
			Regular season					Playoffs
Season	Team	League	GP	G	A	Pts	PIM	GP	G	A	Pts	PIM
1939–40	Linwood St. James	HS-MB	2	0	0	0	0	—	—	—	—	—
1939–40	St. James Deer Lodge	MAHA	—	—	—	—	—	4	8	1	9	0
1940–41	St. James Deer Lodge	MAHA	4	10	0	10	—	—	—	—	—	—
1941–42	St. James Collegiate	HS-MB	5	3	1	4	—	1	2	0	2	—
1941–42	St. James Canadians	MAHA	6	5	1	6	—	5	1	0	1	0
1942–43	St. James Collegiate	HS-MB	6	6	1	7	—	4	4	2	6	—
1942–43	St. James Canadians	MAHA	11	7	0	7	—	7	4	6	10	4
1943–44	St. James Canadians	MJHL	10	9	7	16	4	10	14	5	19	2
1944–45	St. James Canadians	MJHL	—	—	—	—	—	—	—	—	—	—
1944–45	Winnipeg CPR	WNDHL	8	5	2	7	—	3	2	3	5	—
1944–45	Winnipeg Monarchs	M-Cup	—	—	—	—	—	1	1	2	3	0
1945–46	Winnipeg Monarchs	MJHL	8	5	10	15	4	17	3	6	9	4
1945–46	Winnipeg CPR	WNDHL	5	18	13	33	—	2	0	0	0	—
1945–46	Winnipeg Monarchs	M-Cup	—	—	—	—	—	17	16	18	34	8
1946–47	Toronto Maple Leafs	NHL	9	0	2	2	0	—	—	—	—	—
1946–47	Tulsa Oilers	USHL	5	2	6	8	2	—	—	—	—	—
1946–47	Pittsburgh Hornets	AHL	38	4	10	14	18	12	1	0	1	8
1947–48	Providence Reds	AHL	54	24	39	63	44	5	1	0	1	4
1948–49	Toronto Maple Leafs	NHL	42	4	7	11	30	1	0	0	0	0
1948–49	Pittsburgh Hornets	AHL	16	2	8	10	15	—	—	—	—	—
1949–50	Cleveland Barons	AHL	57	27	27	54	39	9	1	3	4	10
1950–51	Cleveland Barons	AHL	61	9	31	41	15	10	4	5	9	4
1951–52	Chicago Black Hawks	NHL	15	1	1	2	0	—	—	—	—	—
1951–52	St. Louis Flyers	AHL	46	19	22	41	30	—	—	—	—	—
1952–53	St. Louis Flyers	AHL	39	14	14	28	16	—	—	—	—	—
1953–54	Buffalo Bisons	AHL	70	10	31	41	24	2	0	1	1	0
1954–55	Buffalo Bisons	AHL	1	0	0	0	0	—	—	—	—	—
1954–55	Ottawa Senators	QSHL	12	0	4	4	4	—	—	—	—	—
1954–55	Sault Ste. Marie Greyhounds	NOHA	24	5	9	14	18	14	3	3	6	4
1955–56	Sault Ste. Marie Greyhounds	NOHA	48	12	21	33	28	5	3	1	4	0
1956–57	Dauphin Kings	MIHA	10	12	0	12	—	10	5	8	13	—
1957–58	St. Boniface Saints	MIHA	5	5	0	5	—	10	10	2	12	—
AHL totals			382	109	182	291	201	38	7	9	16	26
NHL totals			66	5	10	15	30	1	0	0	0	0

== Awards and achievements ==
- Memorial Cup Championship (1946)
- Stanley Cup Championship (1949)
- Calder Cup (AHL) Championship (1951)
- Honoured Member of the Manitoba Hockey Hall of Fame
