= Pete Backor =

Canadian ice hockey player (1919–1988)

- Born: April 29, 1919 Fort William, Ontario, Canada
- Died: June 30, 1988 (aged 69)
- Height: 6 ft 0 in (183 cm)
- Weight: 190 lb (86 kg; 13 st 8 lb)
- Position: Defence
- Shot: Left
- Played for: Toronto Maple Leafs
- Playing career: 1938–1956

Peter Joseph Backor (April 29, 1919 – June 30, 1988) was a Canadian professional ice hockey defenceman who played 36 games in the National Hockey League for the Toronto Maple Leafs during the 1944–45 season The rest of his career, which lasted from 1939 to 1956, was spent in the minor leagues. he won the Stanley Cup with Toronto in 1945.

== Career ==
Pete Backor was born in 1919 in Fort William, Ontario to Slovak parents who emigrated from Orava in northern Slovakia to Canada. Although he played just a single season in the NHL, Backor made it count as he helped the Toronto Maple Leafs win the Stanley Cup in 1945. After that season he spent the next 11 years playing in the minor leagues for the Pittsburgh Hornets of the AHL with whom he won the Calder Cup in 1952, the Hollywood Wolves of the PCHL and the Sault Ste. Marie Indians of the NOHA. Backor retired from hockey in 1956.

He was one of the first players of Slovak descent in the NHL.

== Personal life ==
He was brother-in-law to another NHL player of Slovak descent Rudy Migay who played for Toronto Maple Leafs.

== Career statistics ==
=== Regular season and playoffs ===
			Regular season					Playoffs
Season	Team	League	GP	G	A	Pts	PIM	GP	G	A	Pts	PIM
1938–39	Fort William Forts	TBSHL	23	9	6	15	6	—	—	—	—	—
1939–40	St. Catharines Saints	OHA Sr	29	27	17	44	28	8	2	2	4	6
1940–41	St. Catharines Saints	OHA Sr	31	14	9	23	20	12	2	7	9	12
1941–42	St. Catharines Saints	OHA Sr	27	7	7	14	26	11	2	4	6	11
1942–43	St. Catharines Saints	OHA Sr	21	8	12	20	26	3	2	1	3	9
1943–44	St. Catharines Saints	OHA Sr	28	11	12	23	27	5	0	1	1	4
1943–44	Montreal Royals	QSHL	—	—	—	—	—	1	1	0	1	—
1943–44	Port Arthur Shipbuilders	TBSHL	—	—	—	—	—	9	1	1	2	4
1944–45	Toronto Maple Leafs	NHL	36	4	5	9	6	—	—	—	—	—
1945–46	Pittsburgh Hornets	AHL	61	5	26	31	65	6	1	1	2	4
1946–47	Hollywood Wolves	PCHL	16	5	5	10	24	—	—	—	—	—
1946–47	Pittsburgh Hornets	AHL	48	9	10	19	30	12	2	1	3	6
1947–48	Pittsburgh Hornets	AHL	68	14	39	53	63	2	0	0	0	0
1948–49	Pittsburgh Hornets	AHL	68	10	42	52	64	—	—	—	—	—
1949–50	Pittsburgh Hornets	AHL	63	8	29	37	34	—	—	—	—	—
1950–51	Pittsburgh Hornets	AHL	71	7	33	40	80	13	0	4	4	8
1951–52	Pittsburgh Hornets	AHL	57	3	18	21	49	11	0	0	0	10
1952–53	Pittsburgh Hornets	AHL	53	1	10	11	36	3	0	1	1	16
1953–54	Pittsburgh Hornets	AHL	45	3	11	14	21	5	0	0	0	4
1954–55	Sault Ste. Marie Indians	NOHA	34	6	8	14	24	6	3	0	3	6
1955–56	Sault Ste. Marie Indians	NOHA	2	0	1	1	0	2	0	0	0	2
AHL totals			534	60	218	278	442	52	3	7	10	48
NHL totals			36	4	5	9	6	—	—	—	—	—

== Achievements ==
- AHL First All-Star Team (1946, 1948, 1949, 1950, 1951)
- Stanley Cup Champions 1945 (with Toronto)
