= Rudy Migay =

Canadian ice hockey player (1928–2016)

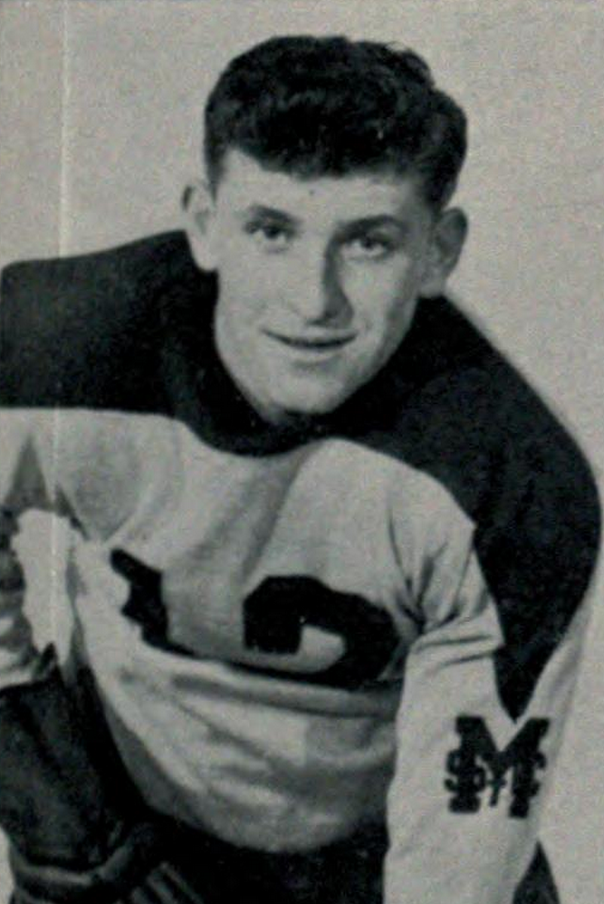
- Migay at St. Michael's College, c. 1947
- Born: November 18, 1928; Fort William, Ontario, Canada
- Died: January 16, 2016 (aged 87); Thunder Bay, Ontario, Canada
- Height: 5 ft 10 in (178 cm)
- Weight: 175 lb (79 kg; 12 st 7 lb)
- Position: Centre
- Shot: Left
- Played for: Toronto Maple Leafs
- Playing career: 1947–1965

Rudolph Joseph Migay (November 18, 1928 – January 16, 2016) was a Canadian ice hockey forward. He played for the Toronto Maple Leafs of the National Hockey League between 1949 and 1959.

== Playing career ==
Migay turned professional in 1948. He spent three years with Pittsburgh's American Hockey League (AHL) club before joining the National Hockey League (NHL)'s Toronto Maple Leafs for a seven-year tenure. This was followed by a couple of years in Rochester and later two seasons in Denver. With both knees considerably weakened by numerous collisions, Rudy moved into coaching with the Tulsa Oilers in the Central Hockey League (CHL) and later with other teams.

Migay coached the following teams - Rochester Americans AHL 1962-1963, Tulsa Oilers CHL 1964-1965, Amarillo Wranglers CHL 1968-1969, Baltimore Clippers AHL 1969-1970, Amarillo Wranglers CHL 1970-1971. The Wranglers were a farm team for the NHL Pittsburgh Penguins.

Following his playing career Migay turned his talents to scouting. He briefly scouted for the Pittsburgh Penguins and Central scouting of the NHL. Migay then joined the Buffalo Sabres scouting staff for 25 years and retired in 2004.

== Personal life ==
He was brother-in-law to the first Stanley Cup winner of Slovak descent, Pete Backor who played for the Toronto Maple Leafs. Migay himself was also of Slovak descent, having both parents born in what is today Slovakia (Orava region). Migay died January 16, 2016, at the age of 87.

== Career statistics ==
=== Regular season and playoffs ===
			Regular season					Playoffs
Season	Team	League	GP	G	A	Pts	PIM	GP	G	A	Pts	PIM
1944–45	Port Arthur Flyers	TBJHL	11	22	10	32	22	3	2	2	4	6
1945–46	Port Arthur Flyers	TBJHL	6	11	17	28	0	10	7	10	17	6
1946–47	Toronto St. Michael's Majors	OHA	29	25	18	43	15	9	2	11	13	0
1946–47	Toronto St. Michael's Majors	M-Cup	—	—	—	—	—	10	7	16	23	2
1947–48	Port Arthur Bruins	TBJHL	7	12	8	20	12	24	17	30	47	18
1947–48	Port Arthur Bruins	M-Cup	—	—	—	—	—	17	13	24	37	16
1948–49	Pittsburgh Hornets	AHL	64	21	31	52	38	—	—	—	—	—
1949–50	Toronto Maple Leafs	NHL	18	1	5	6	8	—	—	—	—	—
1949–50	Pittsburgh Hornets	AHL	44	11	25	36	31	—	—	—	—	—
1950–51	Pittsburgh Hornets	AHL	58	20	38	58	45	13	1	15	16	11
1951–52	Toronto Maple Leafs	NHL	19	2	1	3	12	—	—	—	—	—
1951–52	Pittsburgh Hornets	AHL	32	20	26	46	10	11	7	4	11	8
1952–53	Toronto Maple Leafs	NHL	40	5	4	9	22	—	—	—	—	—
1953–54	Toronto Maple Leafs	NHL	70	8	15	23	60	5	1	0	1	4
1954–55	Toronto Maple Leafs	NHL	67	8	16	24	66	3	0	0	0	10
1955–56	Toronto Maple Leafs	NHL	70	12	16	28	52	5	0	0	0	6
1956–57	Toronto Maple Leafs	NHL	66	15	20	35	51	—	—	—	—	—
1957–58	Toronto Maple Leafs	NHL	48	7	14	21	18	—	—	—	—	—
1957–58	Rochester Americans	AHL	15	5	8	13	18	—	—	—	—	—
1958–59	Toronto Maple Leafs	NHL	19	1	1	2	4	2	0	0	0	0
1958–59	Rochester Americans	AHL	51	24	58	82	100	3	1	0	1	6
1959–60	Toronto Maple Leafs	NHL	1	0	0	0	0	—	—	—	—	—
1959–60	Rochester Americans	AHL	50	16	48	64	50	12	3	10	13	19
1960–61	Port Arthur Bearcats	TBSHL	—	—	—	—	—	—	—	—	—	—
1961–62	Port Arthur Bearcats	TBSHL	—	—	—	—	—	—	—	—	—	—
1962–63	Rochester Americans	AHL	2	1	1	2	4	—	—	—	—	—
1963–64	Denver Invaders	WHL	56	20	31	51	30	6	0	3	3	32
1964–65	Tulsa Oilers	CPHL	50	5	26	31	53	—	—	—	—	—
NHL totals			417	59	92	151	293	15	1	0	1	20

== See also ==
- List of NHL players who spent their entire career with one franchise
