= Al Buchanan =

Canadian ice hockey player

- Born: May 17, 1927; Winnipeg, Manitoba, Canada
- Died: January 17, 1994 (aged 66)
- Height: 5 ft 8 in (173 cm)
- Weight: 160 lb (73 kg; 11 st 6 lb)
- Position: Left wing
- Shot: Left
- Played for: Toronto Maple Leafs
- Playing career: 1948–1955

Allaster William Buchanan (May 17, 1927 – January 17, 1994) was a Canadian professional ice hockey left winger who played four games in the National Hockey League with the Toronto Maple Leafs during the 1948–49 and 1949–50 seasons. The rest of his career, which lasted from 1948 to 1955, was spent in the minor leagues.

== Career statistics ==
=== Regular season and playoffs ===
			Regular season					Playoffs
Season	Team	League	GP	G	A	Pts	PIM	GP	G	A	Pts	PIM
1944–45	Winnipeg Monarchs	MJHL	6	5	5	10	0	6	5	2	7	4
1944–45	Winnipeg Monarchs	M-Cup	—	—	—	—	—	10	4	2	6	4
1945–46	Winnipeg Monarchs	MJHL	9	7	0	7	0	7	2	1	3	0
1945–46	Winnipeg Monarchs	M-Cup	—	—	—	—	—	17	6	4	10	14
1946–47	Winnipeg Monarchs	MJHL	15	16	9	25	11	6	1	4	5	7
1947–48	Toronto Marlboros	OHA	34	22	24	46	0	5	0	0	0	0
1948–49	Toronto Maple Leafs	NHL	3	0	1	1	2	—	—	—	—	—
1948–49	Toronto Marlboros	OHA Sr	37	21	16	37	33	10	1	3	4	26
1948–49	Toronto Marlboros	Al-Cup	—	—	—	—	—	13	3	8	11	15
1949–50	Toronto Maple Leafs	NHL	1	0	0	0	0	—	—	—	—	—
1949–50	Toronto Marlboros	OHA Sr	35	21	24	45	21	14	7	4	11	4
1949–50	Toronto Marlboros	Al-Cup	—	—	—	—	—	16	10	11	21	2
1950–51	Toronto Marlboros	OMHL	32	14	19	33	25	3	1	1	2	2
1951–52	Saint John Beavers	MMHL	77	21	33	54	44	3	1	1	2	0
1952–53	Kitchener-Waterloo Dutchmen	OHA Sr	46	20	21	41	24	11	1	2	3	8
1952–53	Kitchener-Waterloo Dutchmen	Al-Cup	—	—	—	—	—	17	3	9	12	11
1954–55	Niagara Falls Cataracts	OHA Sr	36	8	10	18	10	—	—	—	—	—
OHA Sr totals			154	70	71	141	88	35	9	9	18	38
NHL totals			4	0	1	1	2	—	—	—	—	—

== Awards and achievements ==
- Memorial Cup Championship (1946)
