= Gord Nelson =

Canadian ice hockey player

- Born: May 10, 1947 (age 77); Kinistino, Saskatchewan, Canada
- Height: 5 ft 8 in (173 cm)
- Weight: 180 lb (82 kg; 12 st 12 lb)
- Position: Defenceman
- Shot: Left
- Played for: Toronto Maple Leafs
- Playing career: 1967–1973

Gordon William "Gordie" Nelson (born May 10, 1947) is a Canadian retired professional ice hockey player who played three games in the National Hockey League for the Toronto Maple Leafs during the 1969–70 season.

== Career statistics ==
=== Regular season and playoffs ===
			Regular season					Playoffs
Season	Team	League	GP	G	A	Pts	PIM	GP	G	A	Pts	PIM
1964–65	Melville Millionaires	SJHL	55	3	16	19	99	—	—	—	—	—
1965–66	Melville Millionaires	SJHL	60	11	24	35	91	—	—	—	—	—
1966–67	Trois-Rivieres Reds	QJHL	14	3	8	11	35	7	2	5	7	19
1967–68	Tulsa Oilers	CHL	62	4	18	22	114	10	0	5	5	4
1968–69	Tulsa Oilers	CHL	71	8	22	30	136	7	2	3	5	25
1969–70	Toronto Maple Leafs	NHL	3	0	0	0	11	—	—	—	—	—
1969–70	Tulsa Oilers	CHL	69	10	38	48	158	6	2	4	6	10
1970–71	Tulsa Oilers	CHL	57	4	26	30	23	—	—	—	—	—
1971–72	Phoenix Roadrunners	WHL	67	7	35	42	102	6	0	2	2	16
1972–73	Phoenix Roadrunners	WHL	9	1	3	4	28	—	—	—	—	—
1972–73	Portland Buckaroos	WHL	65	5	25	30	143	—	—	—	—	—
CHL totals			197	22	86	108	317	13	4	7	11	35
WHL totals			141	13	63	76	273	6	0	2	2	16
NHL totals			3	0	0	0	11	—	—	—	—	—
