= Cam Millar (Canadian sportsman) =

Canadian athlete (1927–2020)

Profile
- Positions: Halfback, Defensive back

Personal information
- Born: September 9, 1927; Portage la Prairie, Manitoba
- Died: 9 July 2020 (aged 92); Orangeville, Ontario
- Listed height: 5 ft 11 in (1.80 m)
- Listed weight: 170 lb (77 kg)

Career history
- 1946: Calgary Stampeders
- 1949–1950: Winnipeg Blue Bombers

Campbell Millar (September 9, 1927 – July 9, 2020) was an athlete in football, hockey and golf. He was born in Portage La Prairie. He was a Canadian professional football 1946 to 1950 player who played for the Calgary Stampeders and Winnipeg Blue Bombers and University of Manitoba. He also played ice hockey and captained the Winnipeg Monarchs, who won the Memorial Cup in 1946. Golfer and Manitoba Junior Golf Champion in 1941. He was inducted into the Manitoba Sports Hall of Fame in 2000. Millar was a lawyer after his sporting days, working in the oil and gas industry while living in Calgary, Alberta.
