= Rene Trudell =

Canadian ice hockey player

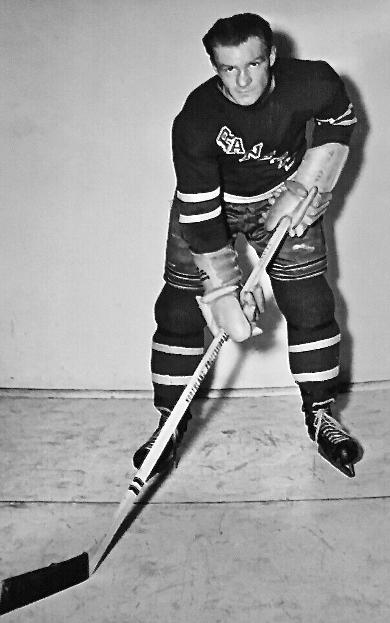
- Trudell with the Rangers, c. 1947
- Born: January 31, 1919; Transcona, Manitoba, Canada
- Died: July 25, 1984 (aged 65); San Francisco, California, United States
- Height: 5 ft 9 in (175 cm)
- Weight: 165 lb (75 kg; 11 st 11 lb)
- Position: Right wing
- Shot: Right
- Played for: New York Rangers; Harringay Racers
- Playing career: 1938–1949

Joseph Rene Edward Trudell (January 31, 1919 – July 25, 1984) was a Canadian professional ice hockey player who played 129 games in the National Hockey League with the New York Rangers between 1946 and 1948. The rest of his career, which lasted from 1938 to 1949, was spent in the minor leagues.

== Biography ==
Born in Mariapolis, Manitoba, Trudell served in the Canadian military during the Second World War. Following the war, Trudell joined the New York Rangers senior affiliate, the New York Rovers playing on a line with fellow Manitobans Cal Gardner and Church Russell. Described by the press as 'flashy', the trio were dominate, with all three players being called up to the Rangers and making their debuts on February 10, 1946. From their debut, the three remained intact as a line until December 1947, with the unit being nicknamed 'Whiz Kids' and the 'rover-boy line.'

After spending parts of three seasons with the Rangers, on April 26, 1948, Trudell was traded to the reigning Stanley Cup champion Toronto Maple Leafs, alongside Gardner, Bill Juzda, and the rights to Frank Mathers for Wally Stanowski and Elwyn Morris, who subsequently sold him to the Springfield Indians, where he would play for a final season before retiring at the age of 30.

Ultimately Trudell spent his entire NHL career with the Rangers, scoring 24 goals and 28 assists for 52 points across 129 career games.

== Career statistics ==
=== Regular season and playoffs ===
| | | | Regular season | | | | | Playoffs |
| Season | Team | League | GP | G | A | Pts | PIM | GP | G | A | Pts | PIM |
|---|---|---|---|---|---|---|---|---|---|---|---|---|
| 1935–36 | West Kildonan North Stars | MJHL | 2 | 0 | 0 | 0 | 2 | — | — | — | — | — |
| 1936–37 | Winnipeg Canadians | MJHL | 15 | 17 | 7 | 24 | 7 | — | — | — | — | — |
| 1937–38 | Portage la Prairie Terriers | MJHL | 21 | 14 | 14 | 28 | 20 | — | — | — | — | — |
| 1937–38 | Hudson's Bay Seniors | MJHL | 5 | 0 | 1 | 1 | 0 | 4 | 0 | 0 | 0 | 4 |
| 1938–39 | Portage la Prairie Terriers | MJHL | 18 | 12 | 11 | 23 | 40 | 3 | 1 | 0 | 1 | 6 |
| 1939–40 | Harringay Racers | ENL | — | 20 | 15 | 35 | — | — | — | — | — | — |
| 1940–41 | Toledo Babcocks | MOHL | 22 | 8 | 21 | 29 | 46 | 2 | 2 | 0 | 2 | 4 |
| 1941–42 | Yorkton Terriers | S–SSHL | 30 | 11 | 28 | 39 | 62 | — | — | — | — | — |
| 1942–43 | Winnipeg RCAF | WNDHL | 13 | 6 | 12 | 18 | 26 | 5 | 1 | 1 | 2 | 6 |
| 1942–43 | Winnipeg RCAF | Al-Cup | — | — | — | — | — | 12 | 4 | 13 | 17 | 30 |
| 1943–44 | Winnipeg RCAF | WNDHL | 9 | 5 | 0 | 5 | 20 | — | — | — | — | — |
| 1944–45 | Winnipeg RCAF | WNDHL | 10 | 12 | 3 | 15 | 6 | 2 | 0 | 0 | 0 | 6 |
| 1945–46 | New York Rovers | EAHL | 40 | 29 | 32 | 61 | 44 | — | — | — | — | — |
| 1945–46 | New York Rangers | NHL | 16 | 3 | 5 | 8 | 4 | — | — | — | — | — |
| 1946–47 | New York Rangers | NHL | 59 | 8 | 16 | 24 | 38 | — | — | — | — | — |
| 1947–48 | New York Rangers | NHL | 54 | 13 | 7 | 20 | 30 | 5 | 0 | 0 | 0 | 2 |
| 1948–49 | Springfield Indians | AHL | 48 | 18 | 28 | 46 | 34 | 3 | 3 | 3 | 6 | 0 |
| NHL totals | | | 129 | 24 | 28 | 52 | 72 | 5 | 0 | 0 | 0 | 2 |
