= 1952–53 MJHL season =

Manitoba ice hockey season

== League notes ==
The Winnipeg Black Hawks change their name to the Winnipeg Barons.

== Regular season ==
League Standings	GP	W	L	T	Pts	GF	GA
Brandon Wheat Kings	36	24	11	1	49	164	123
St. Boniface Canadiens	36	22	13	1	45	179	120
Winnipeg Monarchs	36	16	19	1	33	132	152
Winnipeg Barons	36	8	27	1	17	111	191

== Playoffs ==
Semi-Finals

St. Boniface defeated Monarchs 4-games-to-0

Turnbull Cup Championship

St. Boniface defeated Brandon 4-games-to-none

Western Memorial Cup Semi-Final

St. Boniface defeated Fort William Canadiens (TBJHL) 4-games-to-1

Western Memorial Cup Final (Abbott Cup)

St. Boniface defeated Lethbridge Native Sons (WCJHL) 4-games-to-2 with 1 game tied

Memorial Cup Championship

St. Boniface lost to Barrie Flyers (OHA) 4-games-to-1 game

== Awards ==
Trophy	Winner	Team
Scoring Champion	Ross Jones	Brandon Wheat Kings
Most Goals	Len Thornson	St. Boniface Canadiens

== All-Star teams ==
First All-Star Team
Goaltender	Julian Klymkiw	Brandon Wheat Kings
Defencemen	Elton Taylor	Winnipeg Monarchs
Defencemen	Bill Short	St. Boniface Canadiens
Centreman	Clare Smith	Brandon Wheat Kings
Leftwinger	Leo Konyk	St. Boniface Canadiens
Rightwinger	Ross Jones	Brandon Wheat Kings
Coach	Walter Monson	Winnipeg Monarchs
Manager	Peter Thompson	Brandon Wheat Kings
Second All-Star Team
Goaltender	Don Dawson	Winnipeg Barons
Defenceman	Gord Lawson	Brandon Wheat Kings
Defencemen (tie)	Ed Willems	Winnipeg Monarchs
Defencemen (tie)	Frank Holliday	St. Boniface Canadiens
Centreman	Len Thornson	St. Boniface Canadiens
Leftwinger	Bunt Hubchik	Brandon Wheat Kings
Rightwinger	Ab McDonald	St. Boniface Canadiens
Coach	Bill McKenzie	Winnipeg Barons
Manager	Pat Lyon	Winnipeg Monarchs
