= Gerry Brisson =

Canadian ice hockey player (1937–2013)

- Born: September 3, 1937 Saint Boniface, Manitoba, Canada
- Died: January 16, 2013 (aged 75) Mesa, Arizona, U.S.
- Height: 5 ft 8 in (173 cm)
- Weight: 160 lb (73 kg; 11 st 6 lb)
- Position: Left wing
- Shot: Left
- Played for: Montreal Canadiens
- Playing career: 1957–1970

Gerald Joseph Brisson (September 3, 1937 – January 16, 2013) was a Canadian professional ice hockey left winger. He played 4 games in the National Hockey League with the Montreal Canadiens during the 1962–63 season. The rest of his career, which lasted from 1957 to 1970, was spent in the minor leagues. He was born in Saint Boniface, Manitoba. He died at his home in Mesa, Arizona on January 16, 2013.

== Playing career ==
Signed by the Montreal Canadiens organization at age 16, Brisson came up through the minor hockey ranks in St. Boniface, Manitoba to star with the St. Boniface Canadiens in the Manitoba Junior Hockey League, and later another Montreal Canadiens farm team, the Peterborough TPT's of the Ontario Junior Hockey Association, where he led the team in scoring with 51 points in 52 games. He started his professional hockey career in 1958 in the Western Hockey League (WHL), playing for the Winnipeg Warriors where he was one of the league's top rookies, earning 83 points in his first season, and compiling 91 goals and 103 assists in 3 full seasons with the Warriors. He next played for the WHL Spokane Comets for two seasons, matching his best season with another 83 points and earning a call-up to the Montreal Canadiens where he played four games in the 1962-63 season, earning two assists. He made his National Hockey League (NHL) debut in the Montreal Forum against the Boston Bruins. He then went on to play in the WHL for the San Francisco Seals where he won a WHL Championship (1963–64), the Seattle Totems, and again with the San Francisco Seals. He had a short stint in the American Hockey League (AHL) with the Quebec Aces and led the MSHL St. Boniface Mohawks to an MSHL championship (1968–69) as a player-coach. Brisson was selected to numerous WHL All-Star Teams during his career.

== Coaching career ==
After an 11-year career as a professional hockey player, Brisson embarked on a 10-year career as a coach, general manager, and Western Canada Hockey League (WCHL) franchise owner. He began as a player-coach for the St. Boniface Mohawks (1968–69), then coached the Manitoba Junior Hockey League (MJHL) West Kildonan North Stars for one season (1969–70), and made his WCHL coaching debut with the Brandon Wheat Kings (1970–71). Brisson returned to the MJHL for one season to coach the Winnipeg Monarchs (1971–72), then back to the WCHL to coach the Winnipeg Junior Jets (1972–73), Winnipeg Clubs (1973–76), Winnipeg Monarchs (1976–77) and finally the Calgary Wranglers (1977–78). Brisson later went on to coach the Innisfil Eagles of the Chinook Hockey League where he won a provincial title in the 1992-93 season.

== Owner/builder career ==
Brisson was an owner in the Western Canada Hockey League (WCHL) for six years. After one year as coach, Brisson bought the Winnipeg Junior Jets in 1972. To differentiate from the newly-formed Winnipeg Jets of the WHA, he renamed his team the Winnipeg Clubs (1973–76), and later the Winnipeg Monarchs (1976–77). In 1977 he moved the franchise to Calgary, Alberta as the Calgary Wranglers. He sold the Wranglers franchise in 1979 and retired from hockey to pursue other business interests.

== Awards and achievements ==
- WHL Prairie Division First All-Star Team (1959)

== Career statistics ==
=== Regular season and playoffs ===
			Regular season					Playoffs
Season	Team	League	GP	G	A	Pts	PIM	GP	G	A	Pts	PIM
1953–54	St. Boniface Canadiens	MJHL	1	0	0	0	0	—	—	—	—	—
1954–55	St. Boniface Canadiens	MJHL	29	20	21	41	14	—	—	—	—	—
1955–56	St. Boniface Canadiens	MJHL	21	30	19	49	45	10	12	3	15	4
1955–56	St. Boniface Canadiens	M-Cup	—	—	—	—	—	6	6	3	9	2
1956–57	St. Boniface Canadiens	MJHL	22	21	19	40	60	7	4	6	10	2
1957–58	Peterborough TPT's	OHA	52	28	23	51	0	5	3	0	3	2
1957–58	Montreal Royals	QHL	2	0	0	0	0	—	—	—	—	—
1957–58	Winnipeg Warriors	WHL	1	1	0	1	0	—	—	—	—	—
1958–59	Winnipeg Warriors	WHL	62	38	45	83	20	7	5	0	5	2
1959–60	Winnipeg Warriors	WHL	66	24	32	56	20	—	—	—	—	—
1960–61	Winnipeg Warriors	WHL	70	29	26	55	35	—	—	—	—	—
1961–62	Spokane Comets	WHL	70	44	39	83	60	16	7	9	16	16
1962–63	Montreal Canadiens	NHL	4	0	2	2	4	—	—	—	—	—
1962–63	Spokane Comets	WHL	66	26	21	47	44	—	—	—	—	—
1963–64	San Francisco Seals	WHL	50	18	25	43	15	11	6	2	8	4
1963–64	Quebec Aces	AHL	12	0	1	1	6	—	—	—	—	—
1964–65	Seattle Totems	WHL	63	19	19	38	35	7	0	1	1	2
1965–66	San Francisco Seals	WHL	65	22	15	37	23	3	0	0	0	0
1966–67	California Seals	WHL	7	1	1	2	2	—	—	—	—	—
1968–69	St. Boniface Mohawks	MSHL	—	—	—	—	—	—	—	—	—	—
1969–70	St. Boniface Mohawks	MSHL	—	—	—	—	—	—	—	—	—	—
WHL totals			520	222	223	445	254	44	18	12	30	24
NHL totals			4	0	2	2	4	—	—	—	—	—

=== Coach ===
			Regular season					Playoffs
Season	Team	League	GP	W	L	T	OTL	Result
1968–69	St. Boniface Mohawks	MSHL	24	11	10	3	0	—
1969–70	West Kildonan North Stars	MJHL	34	12	18	4	0	—
1976–77	Winnipeg Monarchs	WCHL	72	31	34	7	0	Lost Round 2
1977–78	Calgary Wranglers	WCHL	72	18	40	4	0	Did not qualify
