= 1972 NHL expansion draft =

Player selection draft

General information
- Date(s): June 6, 1972

Overview
- League: National Hockey League
- Expansion teams: New York Islanders; Atlanta Flames
- Expansion season: 1972–73

The 1972 NHL expansion draft was held on June 6, 1972. The draft took place to fill the rosters of the league's two then-new expansion teams for the 1972–73 season, the New York Islanders and the Atlanta Flames.

== Rules ==
Each expansion team was to select twenty-one players from the established clubs, three players from each of the fourteen existing teams: two goaltenders and nineteen skaters. Thus, a total of 42 players were selected.

The existing teams could protect two goalies and fifteen skaters. First-year pros were exempt. The existing teams could lose only a maximum of three players, including a maximum of one goaltender. The Seals, Canadiens, Flyers and Blues could exempt themselves from losing a goaltender because they had each lost a goalie in the 1970 Expansion Draft; however, the Canadiens and Blues chose to expose a goalie.

In the first two rounds, goaltenders were selected; skaters were selected in rounds three through twenty-one. After each of the first, third and subsequent rounds in which any of the established teams lost a player, the team in question moved one unprotected player to their protected list.

The draft order was to be determined by two coin tosses: one for the expansion draft and the other for the amateur draft. The two general managers, Cliff Fletcher for the Flames and Bill Torrey for the Islanders, agreed to have a single coin toss for first overall in the amateur draft. The winner would pick first in the amateur draft and the first choice of skaters in the expansion draft. The loser would have the first choice of goaltenders and the first choice in the inter-league draft (drafting minor-league professionals). The Islanders won the toss to select first in the amateur draft leaving the Flames to pick first in the expansion draft.

=== Protected lists ===
Boston: goaltenders - Gerry Cheevers and Eddie Johnston; skaters - Don Awrey, Garnet Bailey, Johnny Bucyk, Wayne Cashman, Phil Esposito, Ken Hodge, Don Marcotte, Fred O'Donnell, Ron Plumb, Bobby Orr, Derek Sanderson, Dallas Smith, Fred Stanfield, Carol Vadnais and Mike Walton.

Buffalo: goaltenders - Roger Crozier and Dave Dryden; skaters - Steve Atkinson, Mike Byers, Butch Deadmarsh, Al Hamilton, Tim Horton, Jim Lorentz, Don Luce, Ray McKay, Gerry Meehan, Gilbert Perreault, Tracy Pratt, Rene Robert, Paul Terbenche, Jim Watson and Randy Wyrozub.

California goaltenders - exempt; skaters - Ivan Boldirev, Gary Croteau, Stan Gilbertson, Joey Johnston, Pete Laframboise, Reggie Leach, Bert Marshall, Walt McKechnie, Gerry Pinder, Dick Redmond, Bobby Sheehan, Paul Shmyr, Rick Smith, Bob Stewart and Tom Webster.

Chicago: goaltenders - Tony Esposito and Gary Smith; skaters - Christian Bordeleau, J. P. Bordeleau, Bobby Hull, Dennis Hull, Doug Jarrett, Jerry Korab, Cliff Koroll, Darryl Maggs, Keith Magnuson, Chico Maki, Pit Martin, Stan Mikita, Jim Pappin, Pat Stapleton and Bill White.

Detroit: goaltenders - Andy Brown and Al Smith; skaters - Red Berenson, Gary Bergman, Arnie Brown, Guy Charron, Bill Collins, Alex Delvecchio, Gary Doak, Tim Ecclestone, Tom Gilmore, Larry Johnston, Al Karlander, Serge Lajeunesse, Nick Libett, Mickey Redmond and Ron Stackhouse.

Los Angeles: goaltenders - Gary Edwards and Rogie Vachon; skaters - Ralph Backstrom, Doug Barrie, Serge Bernier, Bob Berry, Larry Brown, Mike Corrigan, Paul Curtis, Butch Goring, Jim Johnson, Real Lemieux, Bill Lesuk, Barry Long, Gilles Marotte, Doug Volmar and Juha Widing.

Minnesota: goaltenders - Cesare Maniago and Gump Worsley; skaters - Fred Barrett, Jude Drouin, Barry Gibbs, Bill Goldsworthy, Danny Grant, Ted Harris, Buster Harvey, Dennis Hextall, Doug Mohns, Lou Nanne, Bob Nevin, Dennis O'Brien, Murray Oliver, J. P. Parise and Tom Reid.

Montreal: goaltenders - Ken Dryden and Michel Plasse; skaters - Pierre Bouchard, Yvan Cournoyer, Terry Harper, Rejean Houle, Jacques Laperriere, Guy Lapointe, Claude Larose, Jacques Lemaire, Frank Mahovlich, Pete Mahovlich, Henri Richard, Jim Roberts, Serge Savard, Marc Tardif and J. C. Tremblay.

NY Rangers: goaltenders - Eddie Giacomin and Gilles Villemure; skaters - Ab DeMarco, Jim Dorey, Bill Fairbairn, Rod Gilbert, Vic Hadfield, Ted Irvine, Bruce MacGregor, Jim Neilson, Brad Park, Jean Ratelle, Dale Rolfe, Bobby Rousseau, Rod Seiling, Pete Stemkowski and Walt Tkaczuk.

Philadelphia: goaltenders - exempt; skaters - Barry Ashbee, Willie Brossart, Bobby Clarke, Bill Clement, Gary Dornhoefer, Rick Foley, Bob Kelly, Ross Lonsberry, Rick MacLeish, Simon Nolet, Jean Potvin, Don Saleski, Dave Schultz, Ed Van Impe and Joe Watson.

Pittsburgh: goaltenders - Cam Newton and Jim Rutherford; skaters - Syl Apps Jr, Larry Bignell, Dave Burrows, Steve Cardwell, Darryl Edestrand, Nick Harbaruk, Bryan Hextall Jr, Sheldon Kannegiesser, Rick Kessell, Al McDonough, Greg Polis, Jean Pronovost, Duane Rupp, Ron Schock and Bryan Watson.

St. Louis: goaltenders - Jacques Caron and Peter McDuffe; skaters - Curt Bennett, Andre Dupont, Jack Egers, Chris Evans, Fran Huck, Mike Murphy, Danny O'Shea, Kevin O'Shea, Barclay Plager, Bob Plager, Phil Roberto, Gary Sabourin, Frank St. Marseille, Floyd Thomson and Garry Unger.

Toronto: goaltenders - Bernie Parent and Jacques Plante; skaters - Bobby Baun, Ron Ellis, Brian Glennie, Jim Harrison, Paul Henderson, Pierre Jarry, Dave Keon, Rick Ley, Jim McKenny, Garry Monahan, Mike Pelyk, Larry Pleau, Darryl Sittler, Errol Thompson and Norm Ullman.

Vancouver: goaltenders - George Gardner and Dunc Wilson; skaters - Dave Balon, Gregg Boddy, Andre Boudrias, Dave Dunn, Jim Hargreaves, Dennis Kearns, Orland Kurtenbach, Wayne Maki, Gerry O'Flaherty, Rosie Paiement, Poul Popiel, Bobby Schmautz, Dale Tallon, Don Tannahill and Barry Wilkins.

== Draft results ==
=== Atlanta Flames ===
Pick #	Player	Position	Drafted from
1.	Phil Myre	Goaltender	Montreal Canadiens
3.	Dan Bouchard	Goaltender	Boston Bruins
6.	Kerry Ketter	Defenceman	Montreal Canadiens
8.	Norm Gratton	Left wing	New York Rangers
10.	Ron Harris	Defenceman	Detroit Red Wings
12.	Larry Romanchych	Right wing	Chicago Black Hawks
14.	Bill MacMillan	Left wing	Toronto Maple Leafs
16.	Randy Manery	Defenceman	Detroit Red Wings
18.	Keith McCreary	Right wing	Pittsburgh Penguins
20.	Ernie Hicke	Centre	California Golden Seals
22.	Lew Morrison	Right wing	Philadelphia Flyers
24.	Lucien Grenier	Left wing	Los Angeles Kings
26.	Bill Plager	Defenceman	St. Louis Blues
28.	Morris Stefaniw	Centre	New York Rangers
30.	John Stewart	Left wing	Pittsburgh Penguins
32.	Bob Leiter	Centre	Pittsburgh Penguins
34.	Pat Quinn	Defenceman	Vancouver Canucks
36.	Larry Hale	Defenceman	Philadelphia Flyers
38.	Bill Heindl	Left wing	Minnesota North Stars
40.	Frank Hughes	Left wing	California Golden Seals
42.	Rod Zaine	Centre	Buffalo Sabres

=== New York Islanders ===
Pick #	Player	Position	Drafted from
2.	Gerry Desjardins	Goaltender	Chicago Black Hawks
4.	Billy Smith	Goaltender	Los Angeles Kings
5.	Bart Crashley	Defenceman	Montreal Canadiens
7.	Dave Hudson	Centre	Chicago Black Hawks
9.	Ed Westfall	Right wing	Boston Bruins
11.	Garry Peters	Centre	Boston Bruins
13.	Larry Hornung	Defenceman	St. Louis Blues
15.	Bryan Lefley	Defenceman	New York Rangers
17.	Brian Spencer	Left wing	Toronto Maple Leafs
19.	Terry Crisp	Centre	St. Louis Blues
21.	Ted Hampson	Centre	Minnesota North Stars
23.	Gerry Hart	Defenceman	Detroit Red Wings
25.	John Schella	Defenceman	Vancouver Canucks
27.	Bill Mikkelson	Defenceman	Los Angeles Kings
29.	Craig Cameron	Right wing	Minnesota North Stars
31.	Tom Miller	Centre	Toronto Maple Leafs
33.	Brian Marchinko	Centre	Buffalo Sabres
35.	Ted Taylor	Left wing	Vancouver Canucks
37.	Norm Ferguson	Right wing	California Golden Seals
39.	Jim Mair	Defenceman	Philadelphia Flyers
41.	Ken Murray	Defenceman	Buffalo Sabres

== See also ==
- 1972 NHL amateur draft
- 1972–73 NHL season
