= Cal Gardner =

Canadian ice hockey player (1924–2001)

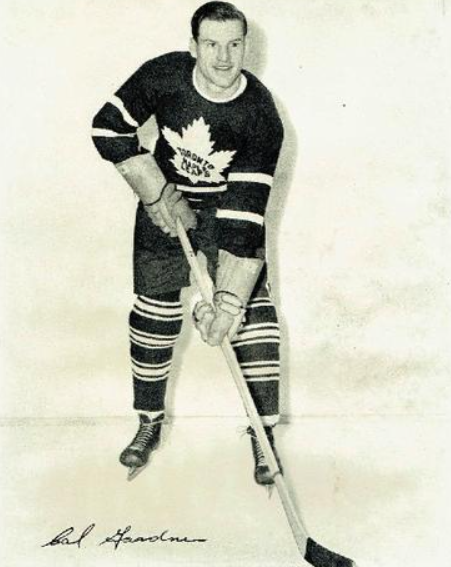
- Gardner in 1950s card
- Born: October 30, 1924 Transcona, Manitoba, Canada
- Died: October 10, 2001 (aged 76) Toronto, Ontario, Canada
- Height: 6 ft 1 in (185 cm)
- Weight: 175 lb (79 kg; 12 st 7 lb)
- Position: Centre
- Shot: Left
- Played for: New York Rangers; Toronto Maple Leafs; Chicago Black Hawks; Boston Bruins
- Playing career: 1945–1961

Calvin Pearly "Ginger, Red, Torchy" Gardner (October 30, 1924 – October 10, 2001) was a Canadian professional ice hockey player. In 1943, after playing professional hockey for three years and winning the Memorial Cup, he joined the Canadian military and took part in World War II. After the war, he returned to professional hockey, joining the New York Rangers affiliate, the New York Rovers. With the Rovers, Gardner centred a line with fellow Manitobans Church Russell and Rene Trudell. The trio were dominant, with all three players being called up to the Rangers and making their National Hockey League debut on February 10, 1946. From their debut, the trio remained intact as a line until December 1947, with the unit being nicknamed "Whiz Kids" and the "rover-boy line." Following the 1948 season, the Rangers traded Gardner to the Toronto Maple Leafs, with whom he won two Stanley Cup championships.

Gardner was later a hockey announcer with Toronto radio station CKFH in the 1970s.

He died in 2001. His two sons Paul and Dave were also professional ice hockey players.

While playing for the Springfield Indians of the AHL in the 1957–58 season, Gardner served as an assistant coach. Gardner also served as a player-head coach while with the Kingston Frontenacs of the EPHL in 1959-60.

== NHL Transactions ==
- 1945: Signed as a free agent with the New York Rovers (EHL).
- April 26, 1948: Traded to the Toronto Maple Leafs (along with Bill Juzda, Rene Trudel and the rights to Frank Mathers) for Wally Stanowski and Elwyn Morris.
- September 11, 1952: Traded to the Chicago Black Hawks (along with Ray Hannigan, Gus Mortson and Al Rollins) for Harry Lumley.
- June 26, 1953: Traded to the Boston Bruins in exchange for cash.

Sources: Legends of Hockey NHLTradeTracker.com

== Awards and achievements ==
- Memorial Cup Championship (1943)
- EHL First All-Star Team (1946)
- EHL Scoring Champion (1946)
- Played in NHL All-Star game (1948 & 1949)
- Stanley Cup Championships (1949 & 1951)
- AHL Second All-Star Team (1958)
- Honoured Member of the Manitoba Hockey Hall of Fame

== Career statistics ==
=== Regular season and playoffs ===
			Regular season					Playoffs
Season	Team	League	GP	G	A	Pts	PIM	GP	G	A	Pts	PIM
1940–41	St. Boniface Canadiens	WJrHL	—	—	—	—	—	—	—	—	—	—
1941–42	Winnipeg CUAC	WJrHL	9	6	3	9	11	—	—	—	—	—
1942–43	Winnipeg Esquires	WJrHL	15	18	9	27	37	6	8	5	13	2
1942–43	Winnipeg Rangers	M-Cup	—	—	—	—	—	10	11	3	14	30
1943–44	Port Arthur Navy	TBSHL	10	18	24	42	15	2	5	3	8	4
1943–44	Port Arthur Navy	M-Cup	—	—	—	—	—	2	5	2	7	4
1945–46	New York Rangers	NHL	16	8	2	10	2	—	—	—	—	—
1945–46	New York Rovers	EHL	40	41	32	73	28	—	—	—	—	—
1946–47	New York Rangers	NHL	52	13	16	29	30	—	—	—	—	—
1947–48	New York Rangers	NHL	57	7	18	25	71	5	0	0	0	0
1948–49	Toronto Maple Leafs	NHL	53	13	22	35	35	9	2	5	7	0
1949–50	Toronto Maple Leafs	NHL	31	7	19	26	12	7	1	0	1	4
1950–51	Toronto Maple Leafs	NHL	66	23	28	51	42	11	1	1	2	4
1951–52	Toronto Maple Leafs	NHL	70	15	26	41	40	3	0	0	0	2
1952–53	Chicago Black Hawks	NHL	70	11	24	35	60	7	0	2	2	4
1953–54	Boston Bruins	NHL	70	14	20	34	62	4	1	1	2	0
1954–55	Boston Bruins	NHL	70	16	22	38	40	5	0	0	0	4
1955–56	Boston Bruins	NHL	70	15	21	36	57	—	—	—	—	—
1956–57	Boston Bruins	NHL	70	12	20	32	66	10	2	1	3	2
1957–58	Springfield Indians	AHL	69	24	57	81	49	13	4	12	16	5
1958–59	Providence Reds	AHL	68	24	39	63	73	—	—	—	—	—
1959–60	Kingston Frontenacs	EPHL	65	32	61	93	57	—	—	—	—	—
1960–61	Cleveland Barons	AHL	72	25	39	64	24	4	1	0	1	0
NHL totals			696	154	238	392	517	61	7	10	17	20

== Coaching record ==
Cal Gardner EPHL coaching statistics
Team	Year	Regular season						Post season
Team	Year	G	W	L	T	Winning %	Finish	Result
Kingston Frontenacs	1959-1960	70	28	39	3	.421	6th in league	Out of playoffs
