= Bill Sutherland (ice hockey) =

Canadian ice hockey player

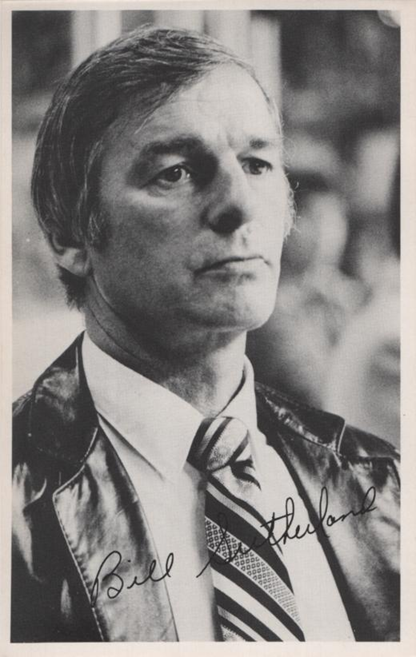
- Born: November 10, 1934 Regina, Saskatchewan, Canada
- Died: April 9, 2017 (aged 82) Winnipeg, Manitoba, Canada
- Height: 5 ft 10 in (178 cm)
- Weight: 160 lb (73 kg; 11 st 6 lb)
- Position: Centre
- Shot: Left
- Played for: Montreal Canadiens; Philadelphia Flyers; Toronto Maple Leafs; St. Louis Blues; Detroit Red Wings; Winnipeg Jets
- Playing career: 1955–1974

William Fraser Sutherland (November 10, 1934 – April 9, 2017) was a Canadian professional ice hockey centre and a National Hockey League (NHL) coach. He played in the NHL for five teams between 1963 and 1972, and then in the World Hockey Association with the Winnipeg Jets between 1972 and 1974. After his playing career he briefly coached the Jets between 1980 and 1981. He scored the first goal in Philadelphia Flyers history in 1967 in a 1–0 victory over the Pittsburgh Penguins.

== Playing career ==
=== Minor league career ===
Sutherland played two seasons with the St. Boniface Canadiens of the Manitoba Junior Hockey League, scoring 60 points in 25 games during the 1954–55 season. He then embarked on a long minor league career, serving stints with the Cincinnati Mohawks, Montreal Royals, Cleveland Barons, and Quebec Aces. He made his NHL debut in 1963, playing two playoff games after a series of injuries to the Montreal Canadiens forward unit.

=== NHL ===
The 1967 expansion gave Sutherland a chance to finally break into hockey's top league, as the Philadelphia Flyers purchased the Aces as their new top farm team and transferred Quebec's best players to the NHL squad. He scored the first goal in Flyers history on October 11, 1967. He became the first player in NHL history to score the first NHL goal in two arenas in the same season. He scored the first goal at the Long Beach Sports Arena in a 4–2 loss to the Los Angeles Kings. Five days later he scored the only goal in a 1–0 victory against the Pittsburgh Penguins at the first game at the Philadelphia Spectrum.

The next season, the Minnesota North Stars selected Sutherland in the 1968 NHL Intra-League Draft. However, he never played for this franchise, and instead was dealt to the Toronto Maple Leafs. After 44 games with Toronto, he was traded back to the Flyers. He spent the next year as a Flyers starter, and he then scored an NHL career-high 39 points in 1970–71 with the St. Louis Blues. The next year, he saw limited playing time with the Blues and the Detroit Red Wings. He ended his playing career with the Winnipeg Jets during their World Hockey Association days.

== Coaching career ==
After retirement, Sutherland was involved with sports broadcasting until his hiring by the Jets as an assistant coach in 1979. After the firing of Tom McVie with three games left in the 1979–80 season, Sutherland became head coach. However, he was fired 29 games into the next season.

== Death ==
Sutherland died on April 9, 2017, at the age of 82.

== Career statistics ==
=== Regular season and playoffs ===
			Regular season					Playoffs
Season	Team	League	GP	G	A	Pts	PIM	GP	G	A	Pts	PIM
1952–53	St. Boniface Canadiens	MJHL	1	0	1	1	0	—	—	—	—	—
1953–54	St. Boniface Canadiens	MJHL	25	25	18	43	42	10	5	12	17	14
1953–54	St. Boniface Canadiens	M-Cup	—	—	—	—	—	8	6	6	12	10
1954–55	St. Boniface Canadiens	MJHL	25	25	35	60	33	—	—	—	—	—
1955–56	Cincinnati Mohawks	IHL	53	25	31	56	24	—	—	—	—	—
1956–57	Cincinnati Mohawks	IHL	58	27	26	53	30	7	1	1	2	4
1957–58	Cincinnati Mohawks	IHL	60	55	39	94	43	—	—	—	—	—
1957–58	Shawinigan Falls Cataracts	QSHL	2	0	1	1	0	—	—	—	—	—
1958–59	Rochester Americans	AHL	1	0	0	0	0	—	—	—	—	—
1958–59	Montreal Royals	QSHL	47	27	16	43	32	7	7	3	10	13
1959–60	Montreal Royals	EPHL	65	35	40	75	40	14	3	7	10	13
1960–61	Cleveland Barons	AHL	58	19	14	33	30	4	0	0	0	12
1961–62	Cleveland Barons	AHL	70	20	28	48	49	6	0	2	2	4
1962–63	Quebec Aces	AHL	45	21	17	38	22	—	—	—	—	—
1962–63	Montreal Canadiens	NHL	—	—	—	—	—	2	0	0	0	0
1963–64	Quebec Aces	AHL	49	22	33	55	32	9	2	7	9	22
1964–65	Quebec Aces	AHL	58	25	35	60	50	5	3	2	5	6
1965–66	Quebec Aces	AHL	48	24	25	49	24	6	3	3	6	2
1966–67	Quebec Aces	AHL	67	40	38	78	27	5	3	4	7	4
1967–68	Philadelphia Flyers	NHL	60	20	9	29	6	7	1	3	4	0
1968–69	Toronto Maple Leafs	NHL	44	7	5	12	14	—	—	—	—	—
1968–69	Philadelphia Flyers	NHL	12	7	3	10	4	4	1	1	2	0
1969–70	Philadelphia Flyers	NHL	51	15	17	32	30	—	—	—	—	—
1970–71	Philadelphia Flyers	NHL	1	0	0	0	0	—	—	—	—	—
1970–71	St. Louis Blues	NHL	68	19	20	39	41	1	0	0	0	0
1971–72	St. Louis Blues	NHL	9	2	3	5	2	—	—	—	—	—
1971–72	Detroit Red Wings	NHL	5	0	1	1	2	—	—	—	—	—
1971–72	Tidewater Wings	AHL	40	6	10	16	26	—	—	—	—	—
1972–73	Winnipeg Jets	WHA	48	6	16	22	34	14	5	9	14	9
1973–74	Winnipeg Jets	WHA	12	4	5	9	6	4	0	0	0	4
WHA totals			60	10	21	31	40	18	5	9	14	13
NHL totals			250	70	58	128	99	14	2	4	6	0

=== Head coaching record ===
Team	Year	Regular season						Postseason
Team	Year	G	W	L	T	Pts	Finish	Result
Winnipeg Jets	1979–80	3	1	2	0	2	5th in Smythe	Missed playoffs
Winnipeg Jets	1980–81	29	6	20	3	15	Fired	—
NHL totals		32	7	22	3	—	—	—

==== Awards ====
- MJHL Second Team All-Star (1955)
- IHL goal scoring leader (1958)
- IHL Second All-Star Team (1958)
- Honoured Member of the Manitoba Hockey Hall of Fame
