= 1954–55 MJHL season =

Manitoba ice hockey season

== League notes ==
Brandon granted a leave of absence.
The Stratton brothers Art and Gord set a league record for most points (76) in a single season.

== Playoffs ==
Turnbull Cup Championship

Monarchs defeated Barons 4-games-to-1

Western Memorial Cup Semi-Final

Monarchs defeated Fort William Canadiens (TBJHL) 4-games-to-3

Western Memorial Cup Final (Abbott Cup)

Monarchs lost to Regina Pats (WCJHL) 4-games-to-1

== Awards ==
Trophy	Winner	Team
Top Goaltender	Ted Derrett	Winnipeg Monarchs
Scoring Champion	Art Stratton	Winnipeg Barons
Scoring Champion	Gordon Stratton	Winnipeg Barons
Most Goals	Art Stratton	Winnipeg Barons

== All-Star teams ==
First All-Star Team
Goaltender	Ted Derrett	Winnipeg Monarchs
Defencemen	Ted Harris	Winnipeg Monarchs
Defencemen	Bob Currie	Winnipeg Monarchs
Centreman	Art Stratton	Winnipeg Barons
Leftwinger	Gerry Wilson	St. Boniface Canadiens
Rightwinger	Gordon Stratton	Winnipeg Barons
Second All-Star Team
Goaltender	Gord Dibley	St. Boniface Canadiens
Defencemen	Gary Bird	Winnipeg Barons
Defencemen	Bert Aikens	St. Boniface Canadiens
Centreman	Bill Sutherland	St. Boniface Canadiens
Leftwinger	Gary Starr	Winnipeg Monarchs
Rightwinger	Curly Melanchuk	Winnipeg Monarchs
