= Ed Kullman =

Canadian ice hockey player (1923–1997)

- Born: December 11, 1923 Winnipeg, Manitoba, Canada
- Died: March 19, 1997 (aged 73) Winnipeg, Manitoba, Canada
- Height: 5 ft 10 in (178 cm)
- Weight: 175 lb (79 kg; 12 st 7 lb)
- Position: Right Wing
- Shot: Right
- Played for: New York Rangers
- Playing career: 1944–1955

Edward George "Eddie" Kullman (December 11, 1923 – March 19, 1997) was a Canadian professional ice hockey player who played 343 games in the National Hockey League with the New York Rangers from 1947 to 1954. Kullman is related to former Hershey Bears player Arnie Kullman.

== Playing career ==
Kullman played six seasons for the Rangers, including three seasons where he suited up for all 70 regular-season games. He participated in one playoff series, in which the Rangers were eliminated by the Detroit Red Wings in six games.

A memorable incident in Kullman's career occurred against Maurice Richard and the Montreal Canadiens. While Kullman was being restrained by an official, Richard took the opportunity to attack him with his stick, sending Kullman to the ice on his knees.

== Career statistics ==
=== Regular season and playoffs ===
			Regular season					Playoffs
Season	Team	League	GP	G	A	Pts	PIM	GP	G	A	Pts	PIM
1941–42	Winnipeg Rangers	MJHL	18	14	5	19	9	—	—	—	—	—
1942–43	Winnipeg Rangers	MJHL	14	15	12	27	15	6	5	8	13	8
1942–43	Winnipeg Rangers	M-Cup	—	—	—	—	—	13	21	12	33	8
1943–44	Winnipeg Rangers	MJHL	2	0	0	0	0	—	—	—	—	—
1943–44	Toronto Maher Jewels	TIHL	2	1	1	2	0	—	—	—	—	—
1943–44	Stratford Kroehlers	OHA	3	4	1	5	2	—	—	—	—	—
1943–44	St. Thomas RCAF	TNDHL	1	0	0	0	0	—	—	—	—	—
1944–45	Winnipeg Rangers	MJHL	1	0	0	0	0	—	—	—	—	—
1945–46	Winnipeg Rangers	MJHL	10	6	4	10	4	—	—	—	—	—
1946–47	Portland Eagles	PCHL	60	56	46	102	135	12	3	7	10	6
1947–48	New York Rangers	NHL	51	15	17	32	32	6	1	0	1	2
1947–48	New Haven Ramblers	AHL	12	5	4	9	8	—	—	—	—	—
1948–49	New York Rangers	NHL	18	4	5	9	14	—	—	—	—	—
1948–49	Providence Reds	AHL	41	16	24	40	22	10	5	4	9	6
1949–50	Providence Reds	AHL	69	32	34	66	62	4	2	2	4	2
1950–51	New York Rangers	NHL	70	14	18	32	88	—	—	—	—	—
1951–52	New York Rangers	NHL	64	11	10	21	61	—	—	—	—	—
1951–52	Cincinnati Mohawks	AHL	7	3	1	4	22	—	—	—	—	—
1952–53	New York Rangers	NHL	70	8	10	18	61	—	—	—	—	—
1953–54	New York Rangers	NHL	70	4	10	14	44	—	—	—	—	—
1954–55	Vancouver Canucks	WHL	53	9	21	30	52	5	0	2	2	6
1954–55	Windsor Bulldogs	OHA Sr	3	0	1	1	6	—	—	—	—	—
NHL totals			343	56	70	126	300	6	1	0	1	2

== Awards and achievements ==
- Turnbull Cup MJHL Championship (1943)
- Memorial Cup Championship (1943)
- Calder Cup Championship (1949)
- Honoured Member of the Manitoba Hockey Hall of Fame
