= Arthur Chipman =

Canadian football executive

Arthur Uniacke Chipman (October 2, 1902 – December 14, 1993) was a Canadian football executive who was president of the Winnipeg Blue Bombers from 1944 to 1948 and president of the Canadian Rugby Union in 1952.

== Early life and business career ==
Chipman was born in Winnipeg on October 2, 1902, to Percy Howard and Bertha M. (Iredale) Chipman. He was involved with a number of business enterprises, including Sterling Securities Corporation, Standard Finance Corporation, and Brathwaite's Limited. He was a member of the Manitoba Liquor Control Commission and served as acting chairman following the retirement of Norman Elliot Rodger.

== Football ==
Chipman became involved with the Winnipeg Blue Bombers in 1936 and was an executive when the club won the 1939 and 1941 Grey Cups. He was chairman of the Winnipeg Rugby Football Club's management committee in 1942 and 1943, when the club sponsored the Winnipeg RCAF Bombers. In 1944, Chipman, as vice president of the Winnipeg Rugby Football Club, announced the organization would not sponsor senior football that season. He was president of the Winnipeg Blue Bombers from 1945 to 1948, during which time the team appeared in three straight Grey Cups. In 1949, he was elected president of the Western Interprovincial Football Union. Three of the conference's teams supported Chipman for a second term, but he did not want to return for another season. During the 1952 season, he was president of the Canadian Rugby Union.

== Other sports ==
Chipman was president of the Winnipeg Rangers of the Manitoba Junior Hockey League from 1942 to 1946. Under his leadership, the club won the 1943 Memorial Cup. He was part of the founding ownership group of the Winnipeg Goldeyes minor league baseball team. He owned several racehorses and was president of the Assiniboia Downs Turf Club. He was a director of the Winnipeg Enterprises Corporation, which owned and operated Winnipeg Stadium and Winnipeg Arena. He was also a member of the board of directors for the 1967 Pan American Games.

== Honours ==
Chipman received the Manitoba Golden Boy Award in 1960. He inducted into the Canadian Football Hall of Fame in 1969, the Winnipeg Football Club Hall of Fame in 1984, and the Manitoba Sports Hall of Fame in 1997. He died on December 14, 1993 in Winnipeg.
