= Mikkelson =

Mikkelson is a surname of Scandinavian origin. Notable people with the surname include:

- Bill Mikkelson (born 1948), Canadian ice hockey player
- Brendan Mikkelson (born 1987), Canadian ice hockey player
- Meaghan Mikkelson (born 1985), Canadian ice hockey player
- Tim Mikkelson (born 1986), New Zealand rugby player
- Barbara and David Mikkelson, founders of Snopes.com, a fact-checking website
