= Carey Wilson (ice hockey) =

Canadian ice hockey player (born 1962)

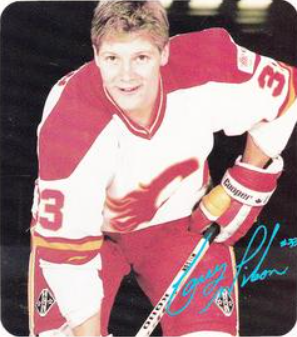
- Born: May 19, 1962 (age 64) Winnipeg, Manitoba, Canada
- Height: 6 ft 2 in (188 cm)
- Weight: 205 lb (93 kg; 14 st 9 lb)
- Position: Centre
- Shot: Right
- Played for: Calgary Flames; Hartford Whalers; New York Rangers; HIFK
- National team: Canada
- NHL draft: 67th overall, 1980; Chicago Black Hawks
- Playing career: 1981–1993; 1996–1997

Carey John Wilson (born May 19, 1962) is a Canadian former professional ice hockey centre who played in the National Hockey League for ten seasons. His father, Jerry Wilson, played three games in the NHL for the Montreal Canadiens in the 1950s, and later was the team doctor for the Winnipeg Jets.

== Playing career ==
Wilson is a rarity in that he played in the Canadian Hockey League, NCAA, Division I hockey in Europe, and the Canadian National Team all before playing his first game in the NHL. He started his career by playing five games for the Calgary Wranglers of the Western Hockey League in 1978–79, then moved on to play for Dartmouth College for two seasons. He was drafted 67th overall by the Chicago Blackhawks in the 1980 NHL entry draft. In 1982 he was a member of the first Canadian World Junior Hockey team to win a gold medal. After playing college hockey, he played two more seasons for HIFK in Finland's SM-liiga and then finally played the 1983–84 season for the Canadian National Hockey team which resulted in him playing in the 1984 Winter Olympics in Sarajevo, Yugoslavia. He scored a hat trick in a 4–2 victory of the United States in the opening game. After the Olympics he joined the Calgary Flames, having been traded in 1982 by the Blackhawks for Denis Cyr.

Wilson made an impact right away, scoring in only his second NHL shift on his first shot in his first game, against Bob Froese of the Philadelphia Flyers. He finished the season with the Flames, and the next season scored 72 points, and won the Rookie of the Month award for October 1984. Wilson was a solid contributor for the Flames until he was traded to the Hartford Whalers in the middle of the 1987–88 season. A little less than a year later, he was traded again, this time to the New York Rangers. He finished the season on a tear, scoring 55 points in the 41 games he played in 1988–89 for the Rangers. Wilson played one more season with them, before being traded back to the Whalers. He only played 45 games with the Whalers in 1990–91 before being traded back to the Flames, where he played a few more seasons before retiring in 1992–93 because of a knee injury. Wilson came out of retirement in 1996–97 to play seven games for the Manitoba Moose of the IHL, the only time he ever played in the minor leagues.

Wilson is the son of NHL player Jerry Wilson. His twin brother Geoff Wilson was also a hockey player and played for HIFK in Finland's SM-liiga (1982–83) with him.

== Awards and achievements ==
- World Junior gold medalist (1982)
- Matti Keinonen trophy for the best plus/minus rating in the SM-liiga (1982–83)
- Played in the 1984 Winter Olympics for Canada
- Honoured Member of the Manitoba Hockey Hall of Fame.

== Personal life ==
In the early 1970s Wilson spent time in Sweden, where his father was a medical researcher. Wilson attended school in Sweden and played on local hockey teams with his brothers.

Wilson was a pre-med student at Dartmouth, and finished his degree in the off-seasons of his playing career. After his retirement, he founded the Carey Wilson Development Program and has his own hockey school in Winnipeg.

His son Colin is a former professional hockey player who played 11 seasons in the NHL with the Colorado Avalanche and the Nashville Predators. The Predators selected Colin with the seventh overall pick in the 2008 NHL entry draft. The BU Terriers won the national championship during Colin's sophomore season in 2009.

== Career statistics ==
=== Regular season and playoffs ===
			Regular season					Playoffs
Season	Team	League	GP	G	A	Pts	PIM	GP	G	A	Pts	PIM
1978–79	Calgary Chinooks	AJHL	60	30	34	64	—	—	—	—	—	—
1978–79	Calgary Wranglers	WHL	5	1	1	2	0	—	—	—	—	—
1979–80	Dartmouth College	ECAC	31	16	22	38	20	—	—	—	—	—
1980–81	Dartmouth College	ECAC	24	9	13	22	52	—	—	—	—	—
1981–82	HIFK	SM-l	29	15	17	32	58	6	1	4	5	4
1982–83	HIFK	SM-l	36	16	24	40	62	4	2	0	2	12
1983–84	Canadian National Team	Intl	66	24	26	50	40	—	—	—	—	—
1983–84	Calgary Flames	NHL	15	2	5	7	2	6	3	1	4	2
1984–85	Calgary Flames	NHL	74	24	48	72	27	4	0	0	0	0
1985–86	Calgary Flames	NHL	76	29	29	58	24	9	0	2	2	2
1986–87	Calgary Flames	NHL	80	20	36	56	42	6	1	1	2	6
1987–88	Calgary Flames	NHL	34	9	21	30	18	—	—	—	—	—
1987–88	Hartford Whalers	NHL	36	18	20	38	22	6	2	4	6	2
1988–89	Hartford Whalers	NHL	34	11	11	22	14	—	—	—	—	—
1988–89	New York Rangers	NHL	41	21	34	55	45	4	1	2	3	2
1989–90	New York Rangers	NHL	41	9	17	26	57	10	2	1	3	0
1990–91	Hartford Whalers	NHL	45	8	15	23	16	—	—	—	—	—
1990–91	Calgary Flames	NHL	12	3	3	6	2	7	2	2	4	0
1991–92	Calgary Flames	NHL	42	11	12	23	37	—	—	—	—	—
1992–93	Calgary Flames	NHL	22	4	7	11	8	—	—	—	—	—
1996–97	Manitoba Moose	IHL	7	0	4	4	2	—	—	—	—	—
NHL totals			552	169	258	427	314	52	11	13	24	14

=== International ===
Year	Team	Event	GP	G	A	Pts	PIM
1982	Canada	WJC	7	4	1	5	6
1984	Canada	OG	7	3	3	6	6
Junior totals			7	4	1	5	6
Senior totals			7	3	3	6	6

Preceded by Timo Nummelin	Winner of the Matti Keinonen trophy 1982–83	Succeeded by Arto Sirviö
