= Arnie Kullman =

Canadian ice hockey player (1927–1999)

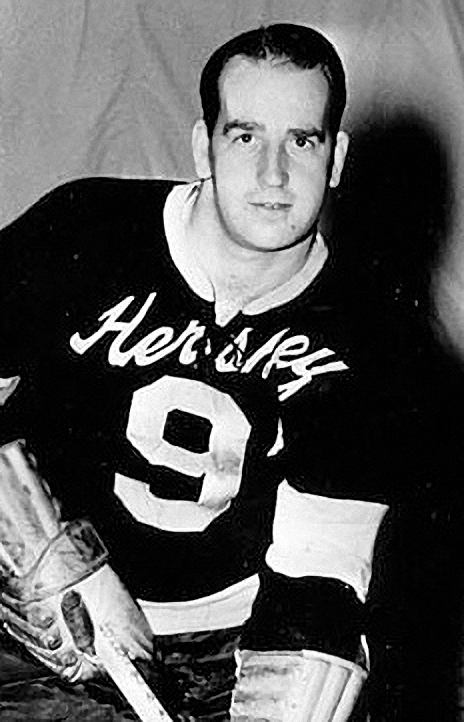
- Born: October 9, 1927 Winnipeg, Manitoba, Canada
- Died: June 11, 1999 (aged 71) Hershey, Pennsylvania, USA
- Height: 5 ft 7 in (170 cm)
- Weight: 170 lb (77 kg; 12 st 2 lb)
- Position: Centre
- Shot: Left
- Played for: Boston Bruins; Hershey Bears
- Playing career: 1948–1960

Arnold Edwin Kullman (October 9, 1927 – June 11, 1999) was a Canadian ice hockey forward who played 13 National Hockey League (NHL) games with the Boston Bruins between 1948 and 1950 and 12 American Hockey League (AHL) seasons with Hershey Bears between 1948 and 1960. His jersey #9 is retired by the Bears.

== Personal life ==
Kullman was born in Winnipeg, Manitoba. Kullman's grandson Justin is the former equipment manager of the Hershey Bears. He was also related (1st Cousin) to the late Eddie Kullman of the New York Rangers. and also a "blood relative" of Cole Avery Sillinger ("VICE WORLD CUP WINNER" 2022 with "CANADA") !!!

== Career ==
Kullman made his professional ice hockey career debut with the Boston Bruins American Hockey League (AHL) affiliate, the Hershey Bears, during the 1948–49 AHL season. In the following season, he was called up for a 14 game stint with the Boston Bruins of the National Hockey League, but was subsequently returned to Hershey on January 11, 1950. Kullman continued his dominance of the American Hockey League and recorded seven consecutive 20 goal seasons until 1956. Although his game slid after the 1955–56 season, he remained one of the few active 200 goal scorers and played on the Bears' penalty kill. He had a career-high season during the 1953–54 campaign in which he recorded 81 points; 40 goals and 41 assists.

Throughout his 12 seasons with the Bears, Kullman dominated the Hershey Bears and set multiple records before officially retiring in April 1960. At the time of his retirement, Kullman ranked second in games played and goals, third in points, and fourth in assists. Kullman died on June 11, 1999, in Hershey, Pennsylvania.

== Career statistics ==
=== Regular season and playoffs ===
			Regular season					Playoffs
Season	Team	League	GP	G	A	Pts	PIM	GP	G	A	Pts	PIM
1943–44	Winnipeg Rangers	MJHL	2	0	0	0	0	—	—	—	—	—
1944–45	Winnipeg Rangers	MJHL	10	11	6	17	12	4	4	1	5	0
1945–46	Brandon Elks	MJHL	4	4	3	7	4	7	4	3	7	8
1946–47	Stratford Kroehlers	OHA	28	29	15	44	26	2	0	1	1	1
1947–48	Boston Bruins	NHL	1	0	0	0	0	—	—	—	—	—
1947–48	Boston Olympics	QSHL	45	24	18	42	45	—	—	—	—	—
1947–48	Boston Olympics	EAHL	17	4	5	9	24	—	—	—	—	—
1948–49	Hershey Bears	AHL	66	20	36	56	29	9	5	7	12	8
1949–50	Hershey Bears	AHL	42	13	14	27	42	—	—	—	—	—
1949–50	Boston Bruins	NHL	12	0	1	1	11	—	—	—	—	—
1950–51	Hershey Bears	AHL	69	32	33	65	52	4	3	2	5	4
1951–52	Hershey Bears	AHL	63	25	31	56	45	1	0	0	0	10
1952–53	Hershey Bears	AHL	64	25	39	64	22	3	0	1	1	4
1953–54	Hershey Bears	AHL	69	40	41	81	35	11	4	8	12	8
1954–55	Hershey Bears	AHL	62	23	48	71	67	—	—	—	—	—
1955–56	Hershey Bears	AHL	63	22	30	52	83	—	—	—	—	—
1956–57	Hershey Bears	AHL	57	18	24	42	53	7	0	1	1	29
1957–58	Hershey Bears	AHL	67	16	29	45	47	11	2	1	3	5
1958–59	Hershey Bears	AHL	59	10	17	27	70	13	2	4	6	16
1959–60	Hershey Bears	AHL	72	9	24	33	57	—	—	—	—	—
AHL totals			753	253	366	619	602	59	16	24	40	84
NHL totals			13	0	1	1	11	—	—	—	—	—

== Awards and achievements ==
- Calder Cup (AHL) Championships (1958 & 1959)
- Honoured Member of the Manitoba Hockey Hall of Fame
- AHL All-Stars (1955)
