= Donald Dawson (disambiguation) =

Donald Dawson was an American lawyer.

Donald Dawson may also refer to:

- Donald A. Dawson, Canadian mathematician
- Don Dawson, in 1953–54 MJHL season
