= Gerry Wilson =

Canadian ice hockey player (1937–2011)

Dr Gerry Wilson
- Born: April 10, 1937 Edmonton, Alberta, Canada
- Died: March 22, 2011 (aged 73) Winnipeg, Manitoba, Canada
- Height: 6 ft 2 in (188 cm)
- Weight: 200 lb (91 kg; 14 st 4 lb)
- Position: Center
- Caught: Left
- Played for: Montreal Canadiens; Minneapolis Millers (IHL)
- Playing career: 1956–1960

Jerold (Gerry) Joseph Wilson (April 10, 1937 — March 22, 2011) was a Canadian professional ice hockey player and physician. Wilson played three games in the National Hockey League (NHL) for the Montreal Canadiens during the 1956–57 season. His son, Carey Wilson, also played in the NHL, and his grandson Colin was most recently a member of the Colorado Avalanche of the NHL.

Credited with recruiting Swedish hockey stars Anders Hedberg and Ulf Nilsson to the Winnipeg Jets of the World Hockey Association, Wilson is said to be the man most responsible for pioneering the arrival of European hockey players to North America. He later worked as the team doctor for the Jets and the Winnipeg Blue Bombers of the Canadian Football League. He died on March 22, 2011, in Winnipeg, Manitoba.

== Hockey career ==
Wilson played three games in the National Hockey League (NHL) for the Montreal Canadiens during the 1956–57 season. He mainly played in the minor leagues and retired in 1960.

== Post-playing career ==
Wilson retired from hockey as a result of injuries to his shoulders and knees. He then enrolled in pre-medical courses at the University of Manitoba, also coaching their hockey team. Specializing in orthopedics, Wilson was given a grant in 1973 to study the subject, along with physical education, at an institute in Stockholm, Sweden. As part of his research, Wilson would study the physiology of hockey players, specifically their heart and lung conditioning. As a result, he was asked by the Winnipeg Jets of the World Hockey Association to watch out for any notable Swedish hockey players. In Stockholm one of Wilson's interns was Anders Hedberg, a hockey player, and he also tested Ulf Nilsson. Wilson informed the Jets of both Hedberg and Nilsson in 1974, and they would join the team that year. Dr Gerry Wilson died peacefully on Tuesday March 22, 2011 at the age of 73.

== Career statistics ==
=== Regular season and playoffs ===
			Regular season					Playoffs
Season	Team	League	GP	G	A	Pts	PIM	GP	G	A	Pts	PIM
1951–52	Winnipeg Canadians	MAHA	20	12	7	19	19	—	—	—	—	—
1952–53	Winnipeg Canadians	WJrHL	—	—	—	—	—	—	—	—	—	—
1953–54	St. Boniface Canadiens	MJHL	31	12	16	28	50	10	6	8	14	19
1953–54	St. Boniface Canadiens	M-Cup	—	—	—	—	—	8	2	3	5	4
1954–55	St. Boniface Canadiens	MJHL	31	35	32	67	59	—	—	—	—	—
1955–56	Montreal Junior Canadiens	M-Cup	—	—	—	—	—	10	3	4	7	10
1956–57	Montreal Canadiens	NHL	3	0	0	0	2	—	—	—	—	—
1956–57	Hull-Ottawa Canadiens	OHA	24	9	19	28	47	—	—	—	—	—
1956–57	Hull-Ottawa Canadiens	QSHL	12	5	5	10	8	—	—	—	—	—
1956–57	Hull-Ottawa Canadiens	EOHL	14	10	8	18	13	—	—	—	—	—
1956–57	Hull-Ottawa Canadiens	M-Cup	—	—	—	—	—	3	0	0	0	0
1959–60	Minneapolis Millers	IHL	2	0	3	3	2	—	—	—	—	—
NHL totals			3	0	0	0	2	—	—	—	—	—
