= Bill Heindl Jr. =

Canadian ice hockey player

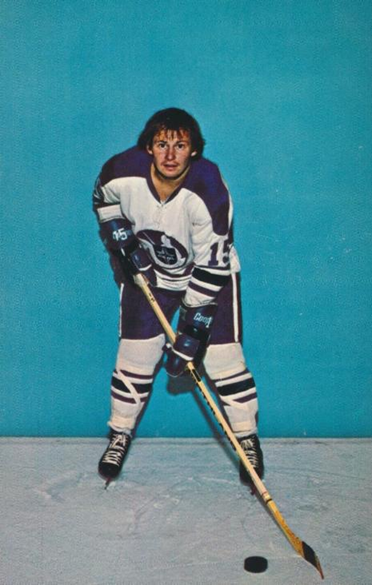
- Born: May 13, 1946 Sherbrooke, Quebec, Canada
- Died: March 1, 1992 (aged 45) Richmond, British Columbia, Canada
- Height: 5 ft 10 in (178 cm)
- Weight: 175 lb (79 kg; 12 st 7 lb)
- Position: Left Wing
- Shot: Left
- Played for: Minnesota North Stars; New York Rangers; Cleveland Crusaders
- National team: Canada
- Playing career: 1966–1977

William Wayne Heindl Jr. (May 13, 1946 – March 1, 1992) was a Canadian professional ice hockey left winger who played 18 games in the National Hockey League for the Minnesota North Stars and New York Rangers between 1970 and 1972, and in the World Hockey Association with the Cleveland Crusaders during the 1973–74 season. Internationally he played for the Canadian national team at the 1969 World Championships.

== Playing career ==
Heindl began his junior hockey career in Winnipeg, Manitoba, playing for the Winnipeg Braves, and then joined the Oshawa Generals of the Ontario Hockey Association for the 1965–66 season. That year Oshawa played in the Memorial Cup, and Heindl put up impressive numbers, scoring 13 goals and 21 points in the playoffs that year. After one season in Oshawa, Heindl joined the Eastern Hockey League's Clinton Comets, where he had his most productive season as a professional scoring 52 goals in 1967–68. He then spent a couple years with the Canadian National Team and was a member of the squad that played in the 1969 World Ice Hockey Championships. He had four goals and an assist in nine games for the fourth place Canadians.

While his NHL rights were held by the Boston Bruins, Heindl never played for the parent club, and in 1970 was claimed by the Minnesota North Stars from Boston in the NHL reverse draft. Over the next two seasons, Heindl spent more time playing for Minnesota's American Hockey League affiliate the Cleveland Barons than in the NHL, and was left unprotected for the 1972 NHL Expansion Draft, where he was claimed by the incoming Atlanta Flames. Atlanta quickly traded him to the New York Rangers for Bill Hogaboam, and he played four games for New York, which was the end of his NHL career. The following season Heindl joined the World Hockey Association's Cleveland Crusaders, who had acquired his WHA rights from the Winnipeg Jets. After two seasons playing in Sweden with BK Backen, Heindl retired from professional hockey in 1977. He turned to coaching, serving for a time as the bench boss of the Steinbach Huskies who reached the 1979 Allan Cup final, but lost the Canadian senior championship to the Petrolia Squires.

His father was Manitoba Hockey Hall of Fame and Manitoba Sports Hall of Fame and Museum Honoured Member Bill Heindl Sr., who also played for – and won – the Memorial Cup in 1941 with the Winnipeg Rangers.

== Personal life ==
Heindl's coaching career was ended by a car accident in which he suffered a serious back injury. Coupled with the death of his father and a failed marriage, he fell into alcoholism and depression. He attempted suicide in 1980 by jumping off a bridge in Winnipeg. Heindl survived, but was left a paraplegic. He was supported by his former hockey teammates, including Bobby Orr, with whom he played in Oshawa as a junior. Orr organized a charity game in Winnipeg to raise money for Heindl. The game, played April 25, 1980, was played between former professional players and former members of the Canadian National Team and was attended by over 15,000 people at the Winnipeg Arena. Over $85,000 was raised for Heindl's recovery. Among the players to join Orr was Wayne Gretzky, and the event marked the only time the two NHL superstars played in the same game.

Heindl's outlook improved, and he became an administrative assistant with the Canadian Paraplegic Association. He encouraged his friends and associates to help raise money for spinal cord research, the result of which became an annual golf tournament in Winnipeg which had raised over $200,000 in its first nine years. The event, called "The Will To Win" helped fund Winnipeg's Spinal Cord Research Centre.

== Career statistics ==
=== Regular season and playoffs ===
			Regular season					Playoffs
Season	Team	League	GP	G	A	Pts	PIM	GP	G	A	Pts	PIM
1963–64	Winnipeg Braves	MJHL	26	7	7	14	18	—	—	—	—	—
1963–64	Victoriaville Bruins	M-Cup	—	—	—	—	—	11	3	4	7	10
1964–65	Winnipeg Braves	MJHL	45	27	33	60	22	15	5	5	10	10
1965–66	Oshawa Generals	OHA	48	15	26	41	46	17	4	5	9	10
1965–66	Oshawa Generals	M-Cup	—	—	—	—	—	14	13	8	21	8
1966–67	Clinton Comets	EHL	72	17	20	37	7	9	3	2	5	13
1967–68	Clinton Comets	EHL	72	52	53	105	20	14	10	5	15	7
1968–69	Canadian National Team	Intl	—	—	—	—	—	—	—	—	—	—
1969–70	Canadian National Team	Intl	—	—	—	—	—	—	—	—	—	—
1970–71	Minnesota North Stars	NHL	12	1	1	2	0	—	—	—	—	—
1970–71	Cleveland Barons	AHL	60	25	11	36	22	8	3	5	8	0
1971–72	Cleveland Barons	AHL	70	22	25	47	19	6	0	3	3	2
1972–73	New York Rangers	NHL	4	1	0	1	0	—	—	—	—	—
1972–73	Providence Reds	AHL	66	21	43	64	10	4	1	0	1	2
1973–74	Cleveland Crusaders	WHA	67	4	14	18	4	5	0	1	1	2
1973–74	Jacksonville Barons	AHL	9	3	2	5	0	—	—	—	—	—
1974–75	Cape Codders	NAHL	74	23	36	59	8	—	—	—	—	—
1975–76	BK Backen	SWE-2	20	16	16	32	48	—	—	—	—	—
1976–77	BK Backen	SWE-2	33	14	3	17	—	—	—	—	—	—
1977–78	Augsburger EV	GER-2	—	—	—	—	—	—	—	—	—	—
WHA totals			67	4	14	18	4	5	0	1	1	2
NHL totals			18	2	1	3	0	—	—	—	—	—

=== International ===
Year	Team	Event	GP	G	A	Pts	PIM
1969	Canada	WC	9	4	1	5	2
Senior totals			9	4	1	5	2

Source: Legends Of Hockey (HHOF)

== Awards and achievements ==
- MJHL Second All-Star Team (1965)
- Turnbull Cup MJHL Championship (1965)
