= Julian Klymkiw =

Canadian ice hockey player (1933–2022)

- Born: July 16, 1933 Winnipeg, Manitoba, Canada
- Died: August 10, 2022 (aged 89) Winnipeg, Manitoba, Canada
- Height: 5 ft 11 in (180 cm)
- Weight: 180 lb (82 kg; 12 st 12 lb)
- Position: Goaltender
- Caught: Right
- Played for: New York Rangers
- Playing career: 1953–1965

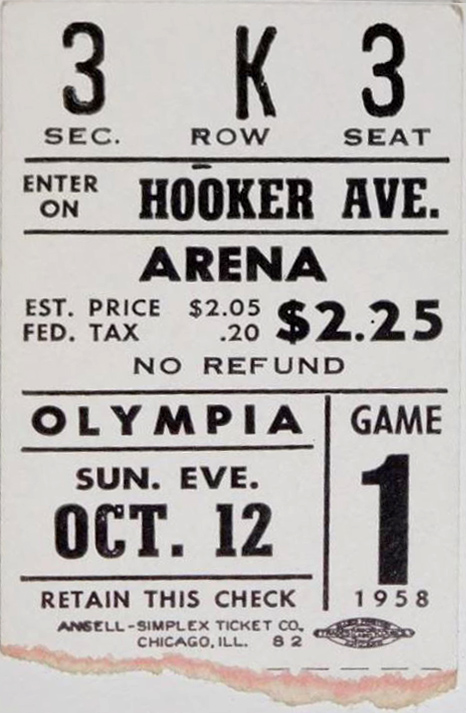
Stub from Klymkiw's one game

Julian Gregory Klymkiw (July 16, 1933 – August 10, 2022) was a Canadian ice hockey goaltender. He played one game in the National Hockey League for the New York Rangers during the 1958–59 season as an emergency replacement. The rest of his career, which lasted from 1953 to 1965, was spent in the minor and senior leagues.

== Biography ==
Klymkiw was working as the Detroit Red Wings's assistant trainer during the October 12, 1958 game between the Rangers and Red Wings at the Detroit Olympia. Early in the third period, Rangers goaltender Gump Worsley was tripped up and crashed into his own net by Gordie Howe, pulling a tendon in his left leg. Worsley was removed from the ice on a stretcher, and the Wings offered the Rangers the use of Klymkiw for the remainder of the game. Klymkiw had been a goaltender during his amateur hockey career and participated in Detroit practices. He entered the game with the Red Wings leading 1–0 and gave up two goals, one to Marcel Pronovost and one to Gordie Howe, for a 3–0 loss.

Klymkiw was also the resident goaltender for the CBS show Shootout in the NHL, which ran in the gaps between periods of games broadcast by CBS.

Klymkiw died on August 10, 2022.

== Career statistics ==
=== Regular season and playoffs ===
			Regular season									Playoffs
Season	Team	League	GP	W	L	T	MIN	GA	SO	GAA	SV%	GP	W	L	MIN	GA	SO	GAA	SV%
1951–52	Brandon Wheat Kings	MJHL	16	8	8	0	960	66	0	4.13	—	—	—	—	—	—	—	—	—
1952–53	Brandon Wheat Kings	MJHL	36	23	11	1	2160	123	1	3.36	—	4	—	—	240	18	0	4.50	—
1953–54	Roving Goalie	EAHL	57	—	—	—	3420	239	1	4.19	—	—	—	—	—	—	—	—	—
1954–55	Brandon Regals	MHL	24	—	—	—	1440	95	2	3.96	—	—	—	—	—	—	—	—	—
1956–57	Winnipeg Warriors	WHL	4	2	2	0	240	20	0	5.00	—	—	—	—	—	—	—	—	—
1956–57	Sault Ste. Marie Greyhounds	NOHA	33	—	—	—	1980	133	1	4.03	—	—	—	—	—	—	—	—	—
1957–58	Winnipeg Warriors	WHL	3	0	2	1	180	8	0	2.67	—	—	—	—	—	—	—	—	—
1957–58	Winnipeg Maroons	Al-Cup	—	—	—	—	—	—	—	—	—	1	1	0	60	2	0	2.00	—
1958–59	New York Rangers	NHL	1	0	0	0	19	2	0	6.37	.778	—	—	—	—	—	—	—	—
1961–62	Warroad Lakers	OSMHL	1	—	—	—	60	3	0	3.00	—	—	—	—	—	—	—	—	—
1961–62	Winnipeg Maroons	Al-Cup	—	—	—	—	—	—	—	—	—	2	—	—	110	7	0	3.82	—
1962–63	Winnipeg Maroons	SSHL	6	—	—	—	360	25	0	4.17	—	—	—	—	—	—	—	—	—
1962–63	Winnipeg Maroons	Al-Cup	—	—	—	—	—	—	—	—	—	10	—	—	610	35	0	3.44	—
1964–65	Winnipeg Maroons	SSHL	2	—	—	—	120	8	0	4.00	—	—	—	—	—	—	—	—	—
NHL totals			1	0	0	0	19	2	0	6.37	.778	—	—	—	—	—	—	—	—

== See also ==
- List of players who played only one game in the NHL
