= 1943 Memorial Cup =

Canadian junior ice hockey championship

The Memorial Cup trophy

The 1943 Memorial Cup final was the 25th junior ice hockey championship of the Canadian Amateur Hockey Association (CAHA). The finals were held at Maple Leaf Gardens in Toronto. CAHA president Frank Sargent chose the location to maximize profits, which were reinvested into minor ice hockey in Canada.

The George Richardson Memorial Trophy champions Oshawa Generals of the Ontario Hockey Association in Eastern Canada competed against the Abbott Cup champions Winnipeg Rangers of the Manitoba Junior Hockey League in Western Canada. It was the first Memorial Cup final series to use a best-of-seven series format. Winnipeg won their second Memorial Cup, defeating Oshawa 4 games to 2.

== Scores ==
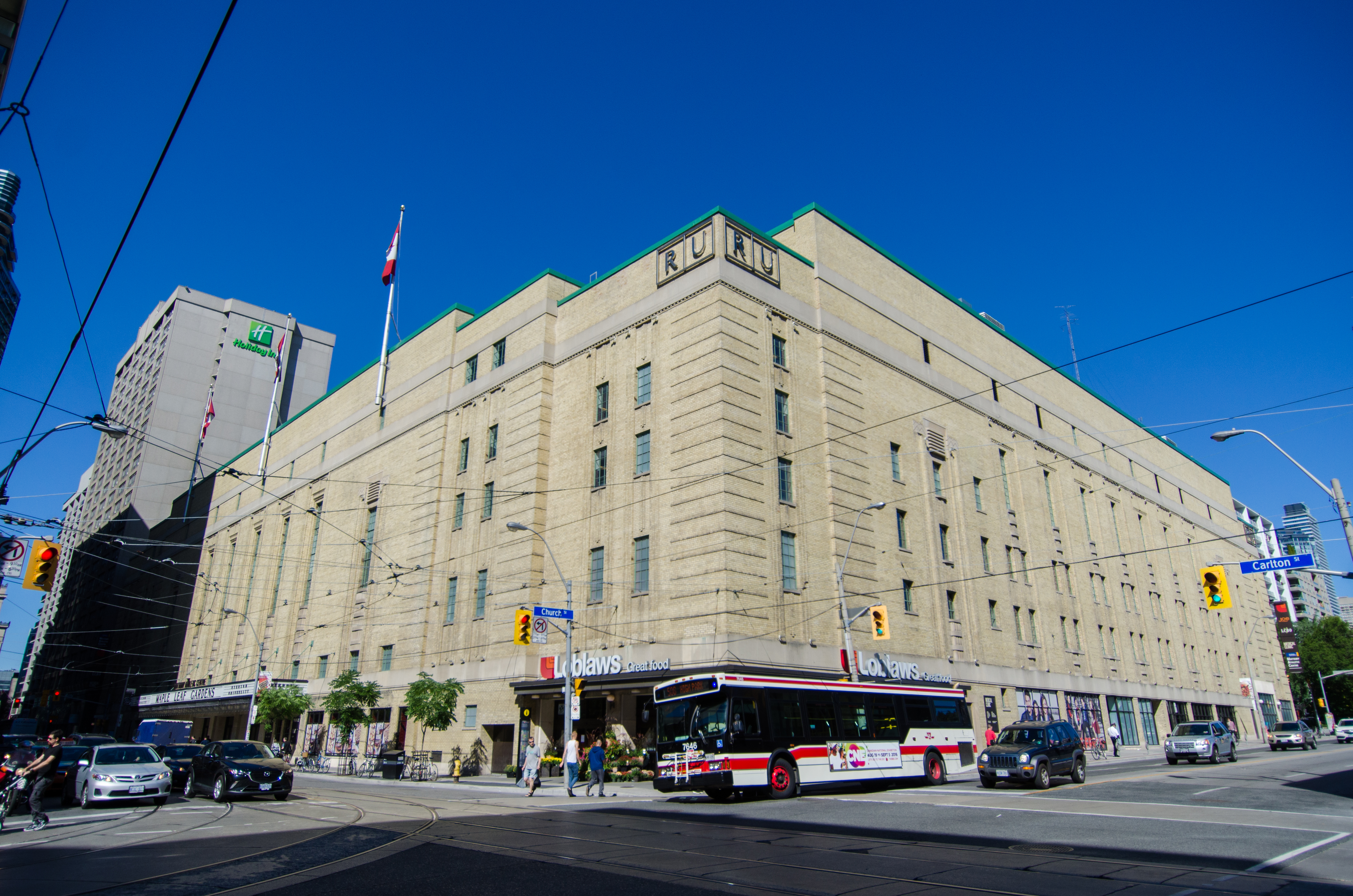
Maple Leaf Gardens

- Game 1: Winnipeg 6-5 Oshawa
- Game 2: Oshawa 6-2 Winnipeg
- Game 3: Oshawa 5-3 Winnipeg
- Game 4: Winnipeg 7-4 Oshawa
- Game 5: Winnipeg 7-3 Oshawa
- Game 6: Winnipeg 6-3 Oshawa

== Winning roster ==
Bill Boorman, Eddie Coleman, Tom Fowler, Cal Gardner, Jack Irvine, Doug Jackson, Ben Judza, Ritchie MacDonald, Frank Mathers, George Mundrick, Joe Peterson, Church Russell, Gus Schwartz, Jack Taggart, Bill Tindall, Bill Vickers, Stan Warecki. Coach: Bob Kinnear
