= Lake Placid Roamers =

American senior ice hockey team

The Lake Placid Roamers were an American senior ice hockey team from Lake Placid, New York. The Roamers operated from 1946 to 1952, and were a farm team of the New York Rangers, and produced future National Hockey League goaltender Gilles Mayer. The team was coached by Aurel Myre and Doug Keenan. The Roamers participated in the first games at the opening of the Olympic Center in Lake Placid, playing two exhibition games versus the Crescent Athletic Club. The Roamers defeated Spokane, Washington's Eagle Electric team in a two-game total goal series played at Lake Placid for the 1967–68 national senior ice hockey title, by scores of 13–7 and 8–3.
