= Bill Heindl Sr. =

Canadian ice hockey and gridiron football player

Bill Heindl

Profile
- Positions: Halfback, Fullback

Personal information
- Born: May 16, 1922; Winnipeg, Manitoba, Canada
- Died: April 13, 1979 (aged 56); Winnipeg, Manitoba, Canada

Career information
- College: St. Paul's

Career history
- 1941: Vancouver Grizzlies
- 1942: Winnipeg Blue Bombers

William Heindl Sr. (May 16, 1922 – April 13, 1979) was a Canadian ice hockey and gridiron football player. As a hockey defenceman from 1940 to 1957, he played on two Memorial Cup championship teams in 1941 and 1942. In football, he played for the Vancouver Grizzlies in 1941 and the Winnipeg Blue Bombers in 1942.

== Early life ==
Heindl was born in 1922 at Winnipeg, Manitoba. He grew up in Winnipeg and attended St. Paul's College High School and St. Paul's College.

== Junior hockey and gridiron football ==
Heindl played junior hockey for the Winnipeg Rangers during the 1940-41 season during which the club won the 1941 Memorial Cup. He also played for the Portage Terriers during the 1941-42 season during which that club also won the 1942 Memorial Cup. The Winnipeg Tribune called him "the best man on the ice" in Portage's championship game and the team's "inspirational force." In postseason voting, he tied with Gord Bell as most valuable player of the 1941-42 Portage Terriers. The Winnipeg Tribune described his unusual checking technique as follows:

Willie is the No. 1 man on the Terrier backline . . . There has been a lot of discussion about the way Heindl takes out incoming forwards. His bodychecking has the tinge of a football block to it. He takes a man out of the play with the side of his body. Football men call it a straight cross-body block. Nobody seems to know whether it is legal or not on skates.

Heindl also played gridiron football at St. Paul's College. In the summer of 1941, Greg Kabat, star player for the Winnipeg Blue Bombers, took the 19-year-old Heindl with him to play for the newly-formed Vancouver Grizzlies of the Western Interprovincial Football Union, forerunner of the Canadian Football League West Division. Heindl played at the halfback position for the Grizzlies during the 1941 season. He threw a pass to Kabat for Vancouver's second touchdown of the 1941 season, described by The Vancouver Sun as follows:

Fifty yards in four plays carried the Grizzlies to their first score. Bill Heindl, who played a sweet chucking and plunging game in the backfield all night, heaved a long 25-yard forward to Gilkes, who scampered a few feet with it. Then Heindl grabbed a couple of yards on plunges, finally heaving to Kabat just over the Winnipeg goal line.

In September 1942, Heindl joined the Winnipeg Blue Bombers as a fullback.

== Military service and post-war hockey career ==
Heindl's athletic career was interrupted by service in the Royal Canadian Navy during World War II.

After the war, Heindl played hockey for the Ottawa Senators (1945-1946), Sherbrooke St. Francis (1946-1949), Sherbrooke Saints (1949-1950), and Saskatoon Quakers (1950-1954).

In 1950, he jumped from Sherbrooke of the Quebec Senior Hockey League (QSHL) to Saskatoon of the Western Canada Senior Hockey League. The Sherbrooke club protested to the Canadian Amateur Hockey Association (CAHA). Sherbrooke relied on a prior ruling that players were not permitted to transfer without the consent of the prior team. The CAHA initially suspended Heindl, but Heindl appealed, and the full CAHA board of governors awarded Heindl to Saskatoon. In response to the ruling, the Sherbrooke club recommended that the QSHL withdraw from the CAHA.

Heindl also served for five months as the coach of the Trail Smoke Eaters hockey club from February through June 1955.

== Later life ==
Starting in 1954, Heindl was employed in the planning and designing department of the Manitoba Highways Department in Winnipeg. He died in 1979 at age 56 at the Grace Hospital in Winnipeg.

Heindl and his wife, Lillian, had three sons. His son, Bill Heindl Jr., played 18 games in the National Hockey League in the early 1970s.

== Awards and achievements ==
- Turnbull Cup MJHL Championship (1941 & 1942)
- Memorial Cup Championship (1941 & 1942)
- QSHL Second All-Star Team (1950)
- WCSHL First All-Star Team (1951)
- Honoured Member of the Manitoba Hockey Hall of Fame

In 2004, Heindl was posthumously inducted into the Manitoba Sports Hall of Fame for his contributions as an all-around athlete.
