= Frank Mathers Trophy =

Ice hockey award given by the American Hockey League

- Sport: Ice hockey
- Awarded for: 2020–21: Canadian Division champions of the American Hockey League

History
- First award: 1995–96 AHL season
- Most recent: Providence Bruins

The Frank Mathers Trophy is to be presented to the American Hockey League (AHL) team that finishes with the best regular season record in the Eastern Conference for the 2020–21 AHL season.

Prior to the impact of the COVID-19 pandemic on the 2020–21 season, the Frank Mathers Trophy was awarded annually to the AHL team that finished with the best regular season record in the Southern Division (1996), Mid-Atlantic Division (1997–2001), South Division (2002–2003), East Division (2012–2015) and Eastern Conference (2004–2011, 2016–2020, 2022-present).

The award is named after former Hershey Bears player, coach, general manager, and team president Frank Mathers.

== Winners ==
Total awards won
Wins	Team
4	Hershey Bears
4	Providence Bruins
3	Norfolk Admirals
3	Philadelphia Phantoms
2	Laval Rocket
2	Toronto Marlies
2	Wilkes-Barre/Scranton Penguins
1	Binghamton Rangers
1	Binghamton Senators
1	Charlotte Checkers
1	Hartford Wolf Pack
1	Kentucky Thoroughblades
1	Manchester Monarchs
1	Philadelphia Phantoms
1	Portland Pirates
1	Rochester Americans
1	Syracuse Crunch

=== Winner by season ===
Key

- ‡ = Eventual Calder Cup champions

Awarded for	Season	Team	Win
Southern Division champion	1995–96	Binghamton Rangers	1
Mid-Atlantic Division champion
Mid-Atlantic Division champion	1996–97	Philadelphia Phantoms	1
Mid-Atlantic Division champion	1997–98	Philadelphia Phantoms‡	2
Mid-Atlantic Division champion	1998–99	Philadelphia Phantoms	3
Mid-Atlantic Division champion	1999–00	Kentucky Thoroughblades	1
Mid-Atlantic Division champion	2000–01	Rochester Americans	1
South Division champion
South Division champion	2001–02	Norfolk Admirals	1
South Division champion	2002–03	Norfolk Admirals	2
Eastern Conference champion
Eastern Conference champion	2003–04	Hartford Wolf Pack	1
Eastern Conference champion	2004–05	Manchester Monarchs	1
Eastern Conference champion	2005–06	Portland Pirates	1
Eastern Conference champion	2006–07	Hershey Bears	1
Eastern Conference champion	2007–08	Providence Bruins	1
Eastern Conference champion	2008–09	Hershey Bears‡	2
Eastern Conference champion	2009–10	Hershey Bears‡	3
Eastern Conference champion	2010–11	Wilkes-Barre/Scranton Penguins	1
East Division champion
East Division champion	2011–12	Norfolk Admirals‡	3
East Division champion	2012–13	Syracuse Crunch	1
East Division champion	2013–14	Binghamton Senators	1
East Division champion	2014–15	Hershey Bears	4
Eastern Conference champion
Eastern Conference champion	2015–16	Toronto Marlies	1
Eastern Conference champion	2016–17	Wilkes-Barre/Scranton Penguins	2
Eastern Conference champion	2017–18	Toronto Marlies‡	2
Eastern Conference champion	2018–19	Charlotte Checkers‡	1
Eastern Conference champion	2019–20	Providence Bruins	2
Canadian Division champion	2020–21	Laval Rocket	1
Eastern Conference champion
Eastern Conference champion	2021-22	Utica Comets	1
Eastern Conference champion	2022-23	Providence Bruins	3
Eastern Conference champion	2023-24	Hershey Bears‡	4
Eastern Conference champion	2024-25	Laval Rocket	2
Eastern Conference champion	2025-26	Providence Bruins	4
