= Tom Fowler (ice hockey) =

Canadian ice hockey player

- Born: May 18, 1924 Winnipeg, Manitoba, Canada
- Died: June 14, 1994 (aged 70) San Diego, California, United States
- Height: 6 ft 0 in (183 cm)
- Weight: 170 lb (77 kg; 12 st 2 lb)
- Position: Centre
- Shot: Left
- Played for: Chicago Black Hawks
- Playing career: 1944–1953

Thomas Fowler (May 18, 1924 – June 14, 1994) was a Canadian professional ice hockey centre who played 24 games in the National Hockey League with the Chicago Black Hawks during the 1946–47 season. The rest of his career, which lasted from 1944 to 1952, was spent in various minor leagues. He was born in Winnipeg, Manitoba.

== Career statistics ==
=== Regular season and playoffs ===
			Regular season					Playoffs
Season	Team	League	GP	G	A	Pts	PIM	GP	G	A	Pts	PIM
1941–42	Winnipeg Monarchs	MJHL	5	0	0	0	0	2	0	0	0	2
1942–43	Winnipeg Monarchs	MJHL	13	4	12	16	0	2	0	0	0	0
1942–43	Winnipeg Monarchs	M-Cup	—	—	—	—	—	8	3	3	6	2
1943–44	Winnipeg Monarchs	MJHL	10	9	16	25	12	3	5	1	6	2
1943–44	Winnipeg Esquires	MJHL	—	—	—	—	—	3	3	1	4	0
1944–45	Winnipeg Navy	WNDHL	16	10	7	17	12	6	3	1	4	6
1945–46	Kansas City Pla-Mors	USHL	54	12	33	45	34	12	1	5	6	2
1946–47	Chicago Black Hawks	NHL	24	0	1	1	18	—	—	—	—	—
1946–47	Kansas City Pla-Mors	USHL	22	8	10	18	14	—	—	—	—	—
1947–48	Tulsa Oilers	USHL	14	1	4	5	8	—	—	—	—	—
1947–48	Fort Worth Rangers	USHL	49	9	28	37	33	4	1	2	3	0
1948–49	Oakland Oaks	PCHL	63	29	57	86	32	3	0	1	1	0
1949–50	Oakland Oaks	PCHL	—	—	—	—	—	—	—	—	—	—
1949–50	Los Angeles Monarchs	PCHL	66	19	32	51	23	17	2	18	20	15
1950–51	St. Michael's Monarchs	OMHL	32	9	19	28	32	9	2	2	4	4
1951–52	Saskatoon Quakers	PCHL	57	8	18	26	22	13	3	3	6	4
1952–53	Saskatoon Quakers	WHL	1	0	1	1	0	—	—	—	—	—
1952–53	Moose Jaw Millers	SSHL	35	25	58	83	8	10	6	6	12	4
USHL totals			139	30	75	105	89	16	2	7	9	2
NHL totals			24	0	1	1	18	—	—	—	—	—

== Awards and achievements ==
- PCHL Southern First All-Star Team (1949)
- PCHL Southern Division MVP (1949)
- SSHL First All-Star Team (1953)
