= Gilles Mayer =

- Born: August 24, 1930; Ottawa, Ontario, Canada
- Died: September 29, 2015 (aged 86); Rhode Island, US
- Height: 5 ft 6 in (168 cm)
- Weight: 135 lb (61 kg; 9 st 9 lb)
- Position: Goaltender
- Caught: Left
- Played for: Toronto Maple Leafs
- Playing career: 1946–1963

Joseph Gilles Camille Mayer (August 24, 1930 – September 29, 2015) was a Canadian professional ice hockey goaltender. He played 9 games in the National Hockey League with the Toronto Maple Leafs between 1949 and 1956. The rest of his career, which lasted from 1946 to 1963, was mainly spent in the American Hockey League (AHL). Mayer stood 5'6" tall, and weighed 128 lbs, which earned him the nickname "The Needle." During his time with the Cleveland Barons, Mayer became the first AHL goaltender to wear a mask.

== Early life and junior career ==
Mayer was born in Ottawa, Ontario, Canada. He began playing goaltender at the age of six due to liking the position. Mayer then played amateur hockey with the Hull Volants of the Ottawa City Hockey League and Lake Placid Roamers, an independent, intermediate senior level ice hockey team. During his time with the Roamers, he was noticed by Johnny Gagnon who helped place him with the Barrie Flyers.

Mayer subsequently made the jump from amateur hockey with the Lake Placid Roamers to junior ice hockey in 1949. He was the goalie of the Barrie Flyers who lost the Eastern Canada championship final series 5-4 to the Montreal Royals. He was subsequently the recipient of the George Richardson Memorial Trophy and Red Tilson Trophy. He began his professional hockey career in 1949 with the Pittsburgh Hornets after his playing rights were purchased from the Montreal Canadiens. Due to his short stature, he was given the nickname "Needle" by the team.

== Professional career ==
=== Pittsburgh Hornets and Toronto Maple Leafs ===
During his first year with the Hornets in the American Hockey League (AHL), Mayer led all goaltenders with an average of 2.50 goals in 22 games after replacing Baz Bastien. As a result of his play, Mayer made his NHL debut with the Toronto Maple Leafs against the Detroit Red Wings on December 1, 1949. During his debut, the Ottawa Citizen reported that they received dozens of telephone calls for the score of the Detroit-Toronto game and to know whether or not Mayer was in the Leafs' nets in place of Turk Broda.

During the 1950–51 season, Mayer nearly surpassed Nick Damore's league shutout record after recording three consecutive shutouts. During a game against the Providence Reds on December 16, 1950, Mayer required a shutout within the first period to beat the record. However, Reds winger Chuck Scherza scored a goal after 12 minutes of play and the Hornets lost 3–2. As a result of his play during the season, Mayer was named to the 1951 AHL All-Star Team.

Early in the second period of Pittsburgh's game against the Syracuse Warriors, on February 6, 1952, Mayer was cut by a puck that struck his face. His nose haemorrhaged but he returned to the ice after thirty minutes. He finished the season second to Johnny Bower in goals against average with 2.57 goals within 68 games and topped the league in shutouts. The following year, he won the Harry "Hap" Holmes Memorial Award and a $300 bonus with a 3.25 goals against average. He allowed 146 goals in 52 games. During his career he was on 3 Calder Cup winning teams; 2 with the Pittsburgh Hornets and 1 with the Hershey Bears.

During his final season with the Hornets, coach Howie Meeker began to become frustrated with his "indifferent play." Following two losses, Meeker fined Mayer $100 for his play and sent him home before a game against the Springfield Indians. In response, Mayer said, "I try awfully hard, but I'm not the only player on the team." Despite this, Mayer was the 1956 recipient of the Harry "Hap" Holmes Memorial Award for the fourth time in five seasons after averaging 2.70 goals per game.

=== Hershey Bears ===
Mayer was traded to the Hershey Bears on July 5, 1956. The Bears also obtained from Pittsburgh defenceman Jack Price, centres Willie Marshall, Bob Hassard, and forward Bobby Solinger. After being dissatisfied with the terms of his contract, Mayer left Hershey's pre-season training camp and was placed under suspension. As a result, his debut season was held off for a few days due to a contract dispute. During his first season with the Bears, Mayer suffered a knee injury and required weeks to recover. As part of his rehabilitation, Mayer traveled to Harrisburg, Pennsylvania, every day to get into a whirlpool bath at the Harrisburg hospital.

In 1958, the Detroit Red Wings asked the Bears to loan Mayer to the Edmonton Flyers as an emergency goaltender. After refusing to travel to Edmonton, Mayer was benched by coach Frank Mathers and fined $200 as a disciplinary measure.

=== Cleveland Barons and Providence Reds ===
As goalie of the Cleveland Barons he sustained a broken jaw during practice and missed three weeks of competition in 1959. Following this, Mayer became the first goalie in the AHL to wear a Goalie mask. The mask had been sent to him from Jacques Plante, the first NHL goaltender to wear a mask.

During the 1962–63 season, Mayer was replaced by Eddie Giacomin as the starting goaltender and subsequently found a stable job with a rug company. As the Reds lost 12 of their 15 games the following season with Giacomin in net, they asked Mayer to step in as the starting goaltender but he refused. Mayer listed his age, a good job, and his long period of inactivity as the reasons for his refusal. As a result, he was suspended from the team.

== Size ==
Gil stood 5'6" and weighed between 128 and 135 pounds during his career. He was "nicknamed "The Needle". Mayer had a natural weight of 128 pounds but tipped the scales at 166 pounds wearing all of his equipment. The 38 pounds of steel, wood, leather, and wool cost $300 and required 30 minutes for dressing and removal.

== Career statistics ==
=== Regular season and playoffs ===
			Regular season									Playoffs
Season	Team	League	GP	W	L	T	MIN	GA	SO	GAA	SV%	GP	W	L	MIN	GA	SO	GAA	SV%
1944–45	Hull Volants	OCHL	7	6	1	0	420	15	1	2.14	—	—	—	—	—	—	—	—	—
1945–46	Hull Volants	OCHL	5	—	—	—	300	35	0	7.00	—	—	—	—	—	—	—	—	—
1947–48	Barrie Flyers	OHA	19	—	—	—	1140	59	3	3.11	—	10	8	2	600	36	0	3.60	—
1947–48	Barrie Flyers	M-Cup	—	—	—	—	—	—	—	—	—	5	4	1	300	20	0	4.00	—
1948–49	Barrie Flyers	OHA	46	26	16	4	2760	134	5	2.91	—	8	8	0	480	21	1	2.63	—
1948–49	Barrie Flyers	M-Cup	—	—	—	—	—	—	—	—	—	8	4	4	490	22	1	2.69	—
1949–50	Pittsburgh Hornets	AHL	50	20	19	11	3000	142	4	2.84	—	—	—	—	—	—	—	—	—
1949–50	Toronto Maple Leafs	NHL	1	0	1	0	60	2	0	2.00	—	—	—	—	—	—	—	—	—
1950–51	Pittsburgh Hornets	AHL	71	31	33	7	4350	174	6	2.40	—	13	9	4	835	26	2	1.87	—
1951–52	Pittsburgh Hornets	AHL	68	46	19	3	4120	175	5	2.57	—	11	8	3	753	24	1	1.91	—
1952–53	Pittsburgh Hornets	AHL	62	36	20	6	3760	146	6	2.33	—	10	6	4	695	20	0	1.73	—
1953–54	Pittsburgh Hornets	AHL	68	33	30	5	4080	212	3	3.12	—	5	2	3	330	13	1	2.36	—
1953–54	Toronto Maple Leafs	NHL	1	0	0	1	60	3	0	3.00	—	—	—	—	—	—	—	—	—
1954–55	Pittsburgh Hornets	AHL	64	31	25	8	3840	179	3	2.80	—	20	7	3	639	28	1	2.63	—
1954–55	Toronto Maple Leafs	NHL	1	1	0	0	60	1	0	1.00	.947	—	—	—	—	—	—	—	—
1955–56	Pittsburgh Hornets	AHL	56	40	12	4	3360	151	5	2.70	—	4	1	3	312	14	0	2.69	—
1955–56	Toronto Maple Leafs	NHL	6	1	5	0	360	18	0	3.00	.871	—	—	—	—	—	—	—	—
1956–57	Hershey Bears	AHL	29	14	12	3	1740	103	1	3.55	—	—	—	—	—	—	—	—	—
1957–58	Hershey Bears	AHL	22	12	7	3	1358	62	0	2.82	—	—	—	—	—	—	—	—	—
1958–59	Hershey Bears	AHL	19	—	—	—	1140	61	0	3.21	—	—	—	—	—	—	—	—	—
1959–60	Cleveland Barons	AHL	41	19	19	3	2460	126	3	3.07	—	7	3	4	420	22	1	3.14	—
1960–61	Cleveland Barons	AHL	66	32	34	0	3960	222	3	3.36	—	—	—	—	—	—	—	—	—
1961–62	Providence Reds	AHL	30	16	13	1	1800	122	1	4.07	—	3	1	2	185	11	0	3.57	—
1962–63	Providence Reds	AHL	34	16	15	3	2040	99	1	2.91	—	—	—	—	—	—	—	—	—
AHL totals			680	346	258	57	41008	1974	40	2.89	—	63	37	26	6	4169	158	2.27	—
NHL totals			9	2	6	1	540	24	0	2.67	—	—	—	—	—	—	—	—	—
