= 1953–54 MJHL season =

Manitoba ice hockey season

== Regular season ==
League Standings	GP	W	L	T	Pts	GF	GA
St. Boniface Canadiens	36	31	3	2	64	225	128
Winnipeg Barons	36	13	22	1	27	125	178
Brandon Wheat Kings	36	13	22	1	27	132	151
Winnipeg Monarchs	36	13	23	0	26	147	172

== Playoffs ==
Semi-Finals

St. Boniface defeated Monarchs 4-games-to-1
Brandon defeated Barons 4-games-to-1

Turnbull Cup Championship

St. Boniface defeated Brandon 4-games-to-none with 1 game tied

Western Memorial Cup Semi-Final

St. Boniface lost to Fort William Canadiens (TBJHL) 4-games-to-3 with 1 game tied

== Awards ==
Trophy	Winner	Team
Top Goaltender	Don Dawson	St. Boniface Canadiens
Scoring Champion	Ab McDonald	St. Boniface Canadiens
Most Goals	Gordon Stratton	Winnipeg Barons
