= Bill Mikkelson =

Canadian ice hockey player

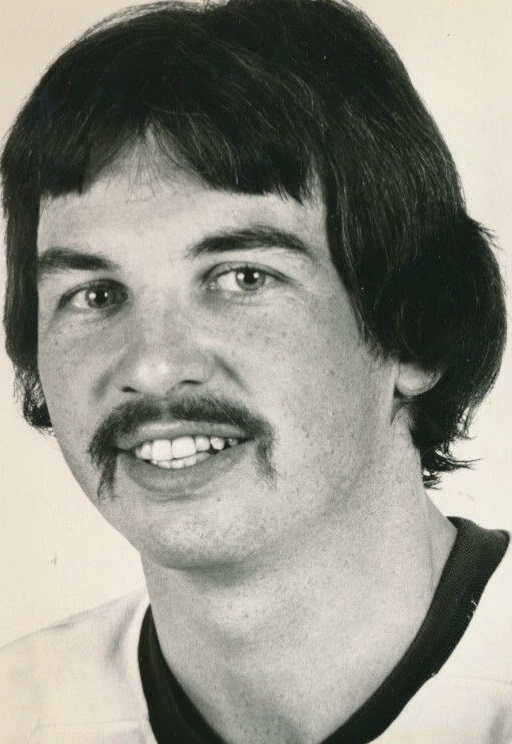
- Mikkelson with the New York Islanders in 1972
- Born: May 21, 1948 (age 78) Neepawa, Manitoba, Canada
- Height: 6 ft 0 in (183 cm)
- Weight: 185 lb (84 kg; 13 st 3 lb)
- Position: Defence
- Shot: Left
- Played for: Los Angeles Kings; New York Islanders; Washington Capitals
- NHL draft: Undrafted
- Playing career: 1970–1977

William Robert Mikkelson (born May 21, 1948) is a Canadian former professional ice hockey defenceman who played in the National Hockey League from 1971 to 1977. Mikkelson is known for posting the worst plus/minus rating in single-season NHL history at -82 for the Washington Capitals in 1974–75.

== Playing career ==
Born in Neepawa, Manitoba, Mikkelson played his junior hockey for the Brandon Wheat Kings and Winnipeg Jets, and was signed as a free agent by the Los Angeles Kings in 1970. He spent two years in the minors in LA's system, earning a 15-game callup to their NHL squad in 1971–72.

In the 1972 NHL Expansion Draft, Mikkelson was exposed by the Kings and claimed by the New York Islanders. In their inaugural season of 1972–73, Mikkelson emerged as one of the icetime leaders on the blueline for the Islanders, and posted 1 goal and 10 assists for 11 points in 72 games. In a sign of things to come, he also posted a plus/minus rating of -54, the third-worst mark ever recorded at the time since the NHL had begun recording the stat in 1967. For the 1973–74 season, Mikkelson lost his spot on the Islanders with the arrival of rookies Denis Potvin and Dave Lewis, and ended up spending the entire season in the American Hockey League with the Baltimore Clippers.

Mikkelson was exposed again in the 1974 NHL Expansion Draft and this time was claimed by the Washington Capitals. His first season with the expansion Capitals would play out almost identically to his first season with the expansion Islanders, as he emerged as an icetime leader on a struggling team. Despite being assigned to the minors late in the year and appearing in only 59 games, he ended up posting an all-time NHL worst plus/minus rating of -82. More than four decades later, this remains an NHL record and no one has posted a mark worse than -69 since.

Mikkelson would spend two more seasons in the minors, appearing in only a single NHL game for the Capitals in 1976–77 before retiring in 1977, playing out the final year of his Capitals contract with Mannheim in Germany. In his NHL career, he appeared in 147 games, recording 4 goals and 18 assists for 22 points, along with 105 penalty minutes.

== Family ==
Mikkelson comes from a prominent hockey-playing family in Manitoba. His uncle Jim McFadden was a star center for the Detroit Red Wings and Chicago Black Hawks and won the Calder Memorial Trophy in 1947–48 and the Stanley Cup with Detroit in 1950. His cousin Glen was drafted 140th overall in the 1972 NHL Amateur Draft by the Minnesota North Stars, although he never played an NHL game.

Mikkelson's son Brendan Mikkelson, a defenceman, was selected 31st overall in the 2005 NHL entry draft by the Anaheim Ducks. He has spent NHL time with the Ducks, Calgary Flames, Tampa Bay Lightning and Pittsburgh Penguins. His daughter Meaghan plays for the Canadian national women's team, with whom she won a gold medal at the 2010 and 2014 Winter Olympics. He also has another daughter, Jillian.

After his NHL career Mikkelson finished his senior year at the University of Manitoba, earning a degree in commerce, and went to work at IBM.

== Career statistics ==
=== Regular season and playoffs ===
			Regular season					Playoffs
Season	Team	League	GP	G	A	Pts	PIM	GP	G	A	Pts	PIM
1964–65	Brandon Wheat Kings	SJHL	3	0	1	1		5	0	1	1	0
1965–66	Brandon Wheat Kings	SJHL	60	9	14	23	92	11	1	3	4	12
1966–67	Brandon Wheat Kings	MJHL	60	9	14	23	92	11	1	3	4	12
1967–68	Brandon Wheat Kings	WCHL	56	14	27	41	119	8	0	1	1	4
1968–69	Winnipeg Jets	WCHL	53	5	26	31	43	7	0	1	1	0
1969–70	Winnipeg Jets	WCHL	59	5	34	39	76	14	1	5	6	16
1970–71	Springfield Kings	AHL	69	2	9	11	50	12	1	2	3	14
1971–72	Los Angeles Kings	NHL	15	0	1	1	6	—	—	—	—	—
1971–72	Springfield Kings	AHL	32	2	3	5	36	—	—	—	—	—
1972–73	New York Islanders	NHL	72	1	10	11	45	—	—	—	—	—
1973–74	Baltimore Clippers	AHL	75	1	21	22	77	7	0	1	1	6
1974–75	Washington Capitals	NHL	59	3	7	10	52	—	—	—	—	—
1974–75	Richmond Robins	AHL	10	0	0	0	16	3	0	0	0	4
1975–76	Baltimore Clippers	AHL	76	3	18	21	52	—	—	—	—	—
1976–77	Washington Capitals	NHL	1	0	0	0	2	—	—	—	—	—
1976–77	Rhode Island Reds	AHL	51	3	7	10	2	—	—	—	—	—
1976–77	Hershey Bears	AHL	22	1	2	3	28	6	0	1	1	4
AHL totals			335	12	60	72	277	28	1	4	5	28
NHL totals			147	4	18	22	105	—	—	—	—	—
