= Elton Taylor =

Canadian football player

Profile
- Position: Halfback

Personal information
- Born: December 5, 1932; Winnipeg, Manitoba
- Died: September 26, 1997 (aged 64); Winnipeg, Manitoba
- Listed height: 5 ft 11 in (1.80 m)
- Listed weight: 185 lb (84 kg)

Career history
- 1954–1957: Winnipeg Blue Bombers

Elton Taylor (December 5, 1932 – September 26, 1997) was a Canadian professional football player who played for the Winnipeg Blue Bombers. He previously played for the junior Weston Wildcats.
