= Arto Sirviö =

Finnish ice hockey player

- Born: 6 January 1962 (age 64) Sotkamo, FIN
- Height: 5 ft 10 in (178 cm)
- Weight: 180 lb (82 kg; 12 st 12 lb)
- Position: Right wing
- Shot: Right
- Played for: HIFK; Jokerit; KalPa; Kiekko-Espoo
- Playing career: 1979–1998

Arto Tapio Ilmari Sirviö (born 6 January 1962) is a retired professional Finnish ice hockey player. Currently he is the head coach of Kristianstads IK.

Sirviö was born in Sotkamo, and began his professional career in 1979 with HIFK where he stayed for two seasons before joining Jokerit in 1981 where he remained for four seasons. Sirviö then moved to Sweden in 1986 where in a seven-year spell, he played for Mora IK and Västra Frölunda. In 1992, he returned to SM-liiga and spent four seasons with KalPa before having short spells with Kiekko-Espoo and Haukat. He moved to Germany in 1996 with Rote Teufel Bad Nauheim and then returned to Sweden in 1997 with Gislaveds SK before retiring.

== Career statistics ==
=== Regular season and playoffs ===
			Regular season					Playoffs
Season	Team	League	GP	G	A	Pts	PIM	GP	G	A	Pts	PIM
1978–79	Jäähonka	FIN.2	35	12	10	22	10	—	—	—	—	—
1979–80	HIFK	SM-l	25	1	1	2	2	1	0	0	0	0
1980–81	HIFK	SM-l	35	7	7	14	6	7	1	3	4	2
1981–82	Jokerit	SM-l	35	16	7	23	26	—	—	—	—	—
1982–83	Jokerit	SM-l	35	16	12	28	4	8	5	0	5	9
1983–84	Jokerit	SM-l	37	22	18	40	12	—	—	—	—	—
1984–85	Jokerit	SM-l	36	23	10	33	4	—	—	—	—	—
1985–86	Jokerit	SM-l	36	18	14	32	14	—	—	—	—	—
1986–87	Mora IK	SWE.2	32	44	11	55	10	—	—	—	—	—
1987–88	Mora IK	SWE.2	32	24	18	42	14	—	—	—	—	—
1988–89	Västra Frölunda HC	SWE.2	36	29	17	46	12	—	—	—	—	—
1989–90	Västra Frölunda HC	SEL	35	16	8	24	8	—	—	—	—	—
1990–91	Västra Frölunda HC	SEL	22	4	4	8	6	—	—	—	—	—
1990–91	Västra Frölunda HC	Allsv	18	3	5	8	0	10	2	1	3	2
1991–92	Mora IK	SWE.2	36	13	12	25	10	—	—	—	—	—
1992–93	KalPa	SM-l	48	15	9	24	18	—	—	—	—	—
1993–94	KalPa	SM-l	45	14	9	23	20	—	—	—	—	—
1994–95	KalPa	SM-l	50	15	21	36	26	3	0	0	0	0
1995–96	Kiekko-Espoo	SM-l	8	0	1	1	6	—	—	—	—	—
1995–96	KalPa	SM-l	15	2	2	4	6	—	—	—	—	—
1996–97	EC Bad Nauheim	GER.2
1997–98	Gislaveds SK	SWE.3	31	13	8	21		—	—	—	—	—
SM-l totals			405	149	111	260	144	19	6	3	9	11
SWE.2 totals			136	110	58	168	46	—	—	—	—	—
SEL totals			57	20	12	32	14	—	—	—	—	—

=== International ===
Year	Team	Event	GP	G	A	Pts	PIM
1979	Finland	EJC	5	6	1	7	2
1980	Finland	EJC	5	1	3	4	2
1981	Finland	WJC	5	2	2	4	0
1982	Finland	WJC	7	3	2	5	0
1983	Finland	WC	10	1	0	1	2
1984	Finland	OG	6	3	0	3	0
Junior totals			22	12	8	20	4
Senior totals			16	4	0	4	2
