= Pierre Jarry =

Canadian ice hockey player (born 1949)

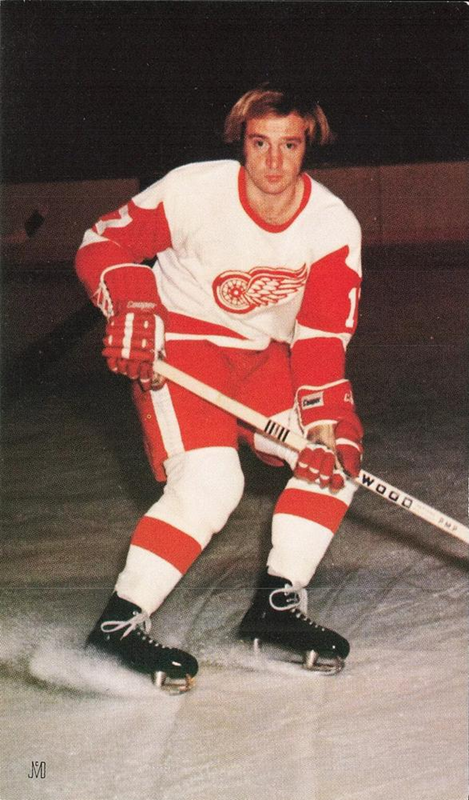
- Born: March 30, 1949 (age 77) Montreal, Quebec, Canada
- Height: 5 ft 11 in (180 cm)
- Weight: 180 lb (82 kg; 12 st 12 lb)
- Position: Right wing
- Shot: Left
- Played for: New York Rangers; Toronto Maple Leafs; Detroit Red Wings; Minnesota North Stars; Edmonton Oilers
- NHL draft: 12th overall, 1969; New York Rangers
- Playing career: 1969–1978

Pierre Joseph Raynald Jarry (born March 30, 1949) is a Canadian former professional ice hockey player who played 344 games in the National Hockey League and 18 games in the World Hockey Association between 1971 and 1978. He played for the Toronto Maple Leafs, New York Rangers, Minnesota North Stars, Detroit Red Wings, and Edmonton Oilers.

== Career statistics ==
=== Regular season and playoffs ===
			Regular season					Playoffs
Season	Team	League	GP	G	A	Pts	PIM	GP	G	A	Pts	PIM
1967–68	Ottawa 67's	OHA	50	36	21	57	61	—	—	—	—	—
1968–69	Ottawa 67's	OHA	53	41	57	98	75	—	—	—	—	—
1969–70	Omaha Knights	CHL	70	26	27	53	62	8	1	2	3	22
1970–71	Omaha Knights	CHL	71	46	46	92	94	11	4	5	9	8
1971–72	New York Rangers	NHL	34	3	3	6	20	—	—	—	—	—
1971–72	Toronto Maple Leafs	NHL	18	3	4	7	13	5	0	1	1	0
1972–73	Toronto Maple Leafs	NHL	74	19	18	37	42	—	—	—	—	—
1973–74	Toronto Maple Leafs	NHL	12	2	8	10	10	—	—	—	—	—
1973–74	Detroit Red Wings	NHL	52	15	23	38	17	—	—	—	—	—
1974–75	Detroit Red Wings	NHL	39	8	13	21	4	—	—	—	—	—
1974–75	Virginia Red Wings	AHL	20	11	12	23	17	—	—	—	—	—
1975–76	New Haven Nighthawks	AHL	13	5	7	12	18	—	—	—	—	—
1975–76	Minnesota North Stars	NHL	59	21	18	39	32	—	—	—	—	—
1976–77	Minnesota North Stars	NHL	21	8	13	21	2	—	—	—	—	—
1977–78	Fort Worth Texans	CHL	15	4	8	12	14	—	—	—	—	—
1977–78	Minnesota North Stars	NHL	35	9	17	26	2	—	—	—	—	—
1977–78	Edmonton Oilers	WHA	18	4	10	14	4	5	1	0	1	4
WHA totals			18	4	10	14	4	5	1	0	1	0
NHL totals			344	88	117	205	142	5	0	1	1	0

Preceded by André Dupont	New York Rangers first-round draft pick 1969	Succeeded by Norm Gratton
Preceded by Jack Egers	CHL Leading Scorer; 1970–71	Succeeded by Ross Perkins
