= Norm Gratton =

Canadian ice hockey player (1950–2010)

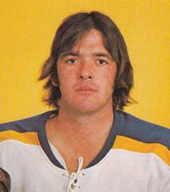
- Born: December 22, 1950 LaSalle, Quebec, Canada
- Died: December 10, 2010 (aged 59) Montreal, Quebec, Canada
- Height: 5 ft 11 in (180 cm)
- Weight: 165 lb (75 kg; 11 st 11 lb)
- Position: Left wing
- Shot: Left
- Played for: New York Rangers; Atlanta Flames; Buffalo Sabres; Minnesota North Stars
- NHL draft: 11th overall, 1970; New York Rangers
- Playing career: 1970–1977

Normand Lionel Gratton (December 22, 1950 – December 10, 2010) was a Canadian professional ice hockey right winger. He played six seasons in the National Hockey League (NHL) with the New York Rangers, Atlanta Flames, Buffalo Sabres and Minnesota North Stars. He played 201 games in the NHL, scoring 39 goals and 44 assists. His brother Gilles also played in the NHL. He died in 2010 at the age of 59.

== Career statistics ==
=== Regular season and playoffs ===
			Regular season					Playoffs
Season	Team	League	GP	G	A	Pts	PIM	GP	G	A	Pts	PIM
1967–68	Thetford Mines Canadiens	QJAHL	50	21	47	68	—	7	4	6	10	2
1968–69	Montreal Junior Canadiens	OHA	53	10	23	33	37	14	7	10	17	4
1968–69	Montreal Junior Canadiens	M-Cup	—	—	—	—	—	8	2	6	8	16
1969–70	Montreal Junior Canadiens	OHA	54	32	41	73	65	16	10	14	24	12
1969–70	Montreal Junior Canadiens	M-Cup	—	—	—	—	—	12	8	15	23	12
1970–71	Omaha Knights	CHL	70	19	31	50	52	11	6	2	8	0
1971–72	New York Rangers	NHL	3	0	1	1	0	—	—	—	—	—
1971–72	Omaha Knights	CHL	68	32	42	74	82	—	—	—	—	—
1972–73	Atlanta Flames	NHL	29	3	6	9	12	—	—	—	—	—
1972–73	Omaha Knights	CHL	11	5	8	13	4	—	—	—	—	—
1972–73	Buffalo Sabres	NHL	21	6	5	11	12	6	0	1	1	2
1973–74	Buffalo Sabres	NHL	57	6	11	17	16	—	—	—	—	—
1974–75	Buffalo Sabres	NHL	25	3	6	9	2	—	—	—	—	—
1974–75	Minnesota North Stars	NHL	34	14	12	26	8	—	—	—	—	—
1975–76	Minnesota North Stars	NHL	32	7	3	10	14	—	—	—	—	—
1975–76	New Haven Nighthawks	AHL	29	7	7	14	4	3	0	0	0	0
1976–77	Maine Nordiques	NAHL	52	15	26	41	16	11	1	3	4	0
NHL totals			201	39	44	83	64	6	0	1	1	2

== See also ==
- List of family relations in the NHL

Preceded by Pierre Jarry	New York Rangers first-round draft pick 1970	Succeeded by Steve Vickers
