= Gordon Stratton =

Canadian ice hockey player (1934–2015)

Gordon Stratton (October 4, 1934 – July 3, 2015) was a Canadian ice hockey right winger who recording 474 goals and 502 assists for 976 points as a pro. Stratton was born in Winnipeg, Manitoba, Canada. Stratton died on July 3, 2015, at the age of 80.

== Awards and achievements ==
- MJHL Goal Scoring Leader (1954)
- MJHL Co-Scoring Champion (1955)
- MJHL First Team Allstar (1955)
- EHL Championship (1965)
- "Honoured Member" of the Manitoba Hockey Hall of Fame
