= Frank Mathers =

Canadian ice hockey player (1924–2005)

- Hockey Hall of Fame, 1992 (Builder)
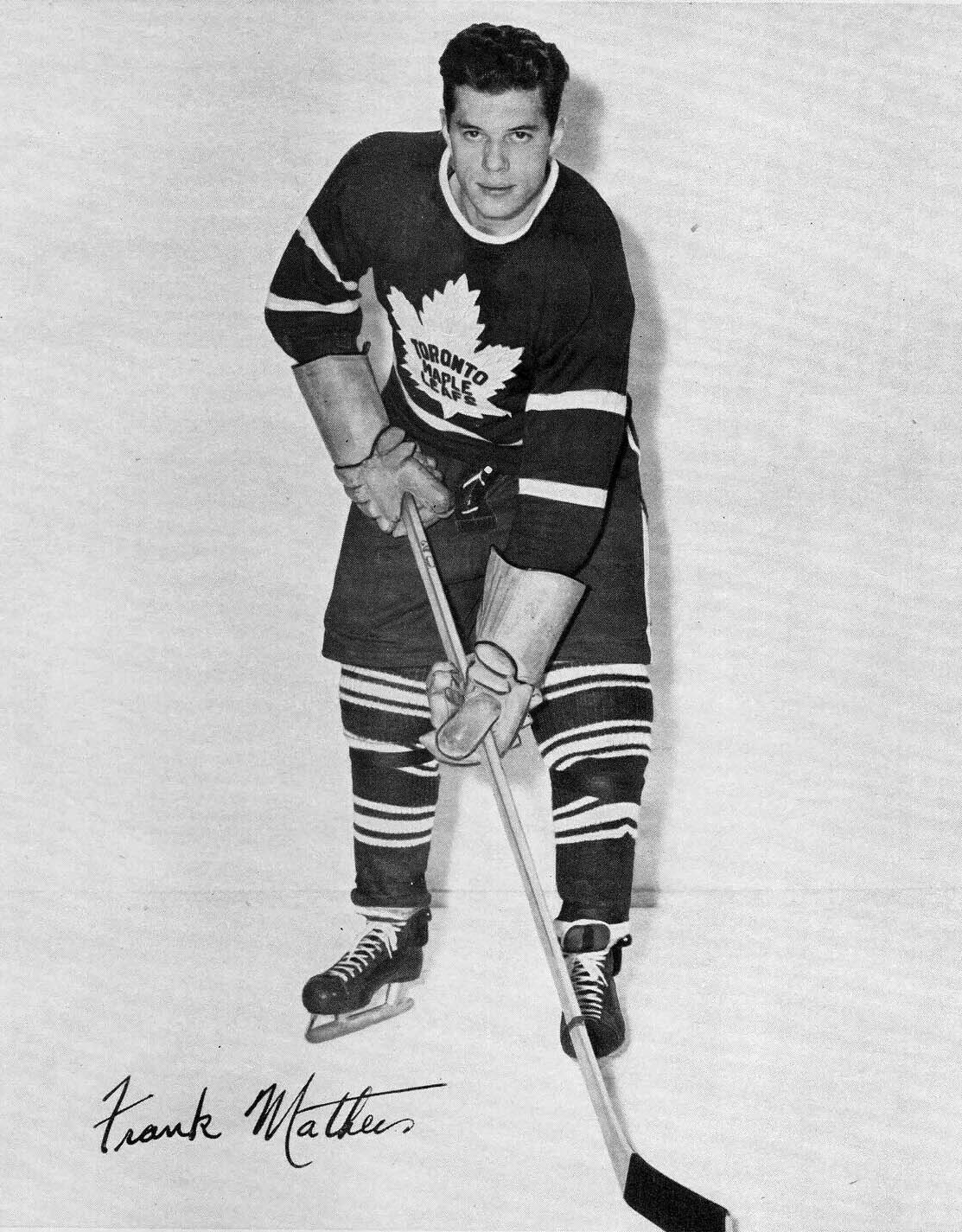
- Mathers with the Toronto Maple Leafs
- Born: March 29, 1924 Winnipeg, Manitoba, Canada
- Died: February 9, 2005 (aged 80) Hershey, Pennsylvania, USA
- Height: 6 ft 1 in (185 cm)
- Weight: 182 lb (83 kg; 13 st 0 lb)
- Position: Defence
- Shot: Left
- Played for: Toronto Maple Leafs
- Playing career: 1948–1962

Frank Sydney Mathers (March 29, 1924 – February 9, 2005) was a Canadian professional ice hockey player during the 1940s and 1950s. He competed with the National Hockey League's Toronto Maple Leafs and the American Hockey League's Pittsburgh Hornets and Hershey Bears. He is best known for his 35-year association with the Bears as a player, coach, GM, and President and was elected as a member of the Hockey Hall of Fame in the builder's category in 1992.

One of the AHL's most accomplished players, Mathers stood as the all-time assist- and point-scoring leader among AHL defencemen upon his retirement as a player in 1962. He was selected to the AHL All-Star Team for five consecutive years. As a player or executive, he won eight Calder Cups—two as a player for Pittsburgh (1952 and 1955), two as a player/coach for Hershey (1958 and 1959), one as a coach for Hershey (1969), and three as a general manager for Hershey (1974, 1980 and 1988). In 1987, he was awarded the Lester Patrick Trophy for his lifelong commitment to hockey in the United States. Mathers retired from the Bears in 1991 after 35 years with the Hershey Bears (17 as a coach, with the first 6 as a player/coach, and 18 as general manager/team president). The Bears have retired number 3 in his honor.

He is one of few Honored Members of the Hockey Hall of Fame whose North American career was almost entirely outside of the NHL (having played just 23 NHL games), having been enshrined in 1992 in the builders' category. Mathers was also inducted as a charter member of the AHL Hall of Fame in 2006 in Winnipeg.

== Early life ==
Mathers was born on March 29, 1924, in Winnipeg, Manitoba. Growing up in Wolseley, Winnipeg, Mathers played junior ice hockey for the Excelsiors Hockey Club and Winnipeg Rangers with whom he won a provincial bantam B and two midget championships and two juvenile titles. While attending Gordon Bell High School, Mathers competed in the City High School football league. At the start of the 1941 season, he led the team to a 31–0 win, the most decisive victory in the school's history. The Winnipeg Tribune reporter Vince Leah described Mathers as "a big, bulky, likeable kid, modest almost to a fault, extremely good-natured and best of all a true gentleman."

While competing with the Rangers during the 1943–44 season, Mathers began to draw attention from National Hockey League (NHL) scouts. However, he enlisted in the Royal Canadian Air Force (RCAF) and attended St. Patricks College. During his time in the Air Force, Mathers was a fullback for the Winnipeg Blue Bombers and Ottawa Rough Riders in the Canadian Football League. In 1942, at the age of 18, Mathers played for the Winnipeg RCAF Bombers in the first-ever non-civilian Grey Cup game, losing 8–5 to the Toronto RCAF Hurricanes. He eventually quit football to concentrate on hockey but rejoined the Blue Bombers in 1943 before transferring to the Ottawa Rough Riders. Later, Mathers said he thought he played football better than hockey but chose hockey due to finances.

Mathers was encouraged by Toronto Maple Leafs owner Conn Smythe to play for the Leafs instead of continuing his pursuit of a degree. Smythe told him he could earn around $100,000 with the Leafs, which could then pay for his dream of attending dentistry school. In response, Mathers told Maple Leafs executives he would only play for the team if it was certain he would make it to the professional level. While playing for the Ottawa All-Stars during the 1946–47 season, he travelled with them to England for some exhibition games and was given a proposition to stay in the country. However, he turned it down and returned to North America. Mathers eventually agreed to play with the Leafs after he was told he lacked sufficient credits to enroll at the University of Ottawa.

== Career ==
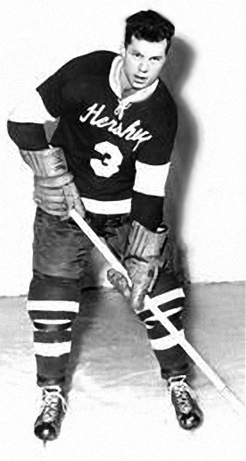
Mathers with the Hershey Bears in the 1950s

Mathers attended the Maple Leafs' training camp before their 1948–49 season and signed a three-year contract with the team. Although he committed to play in the professional league, he announced he would attend summer school either in Ottawa or Manitoba to complete his Bachelor of Science degree and enroll at a dentistry school. After playing 15 games with the Maple Leafs, Mathers agreed to be re-assigned to their American Hockey League (AHL) affiliate, the Pittsburgh Hornets, so he could continue to play ice hockey. On December 3, 1948, Smythe officially re-assigned Mathers and Les Costello to the Hornets. After spending the season with the Hornets, Mathers attended the Leafs' training camp before the 1949–50 season where he subsequently fractured his toe.

In 1952, Mathers announced he had plans to leave the AHL and settle down in Pittsburgh with his family. Although a friend said he had plans to pursue his dentistry degree, Mathers later announced he just wanted to find a stable job in Pittsburgh. In 1954, Mathers and teammate Gilles Mayer were chosen for the American Hockey League's all-star team. He received 24 votes to beat out Emile Francis of the Cleveland Barons. The following year, he was the only unanimous choice for the 1954-55 American Hockey League all-star team.

After announcing his plans for retirement and pursuit of his dentistry degree, Hershey Bears president John Sollenberger convinced Mathers to sign with the Bears as a player-coach. He took Mathers to Hershey Park, where they rode rollercoasters while he pitched the team to him and his wife. When he joined the Bears, they had missed the playoffs for two consecutive seasons. Upon taking over, the team qualified for the playoffs in 1957 and then earned back-to-back Calder Cup championships in 1958 and 1959. During his tenure with the Bears, Mather led them to the playoffs 30 out of 35 years; resulting in six Calder Cup championships and five times runners-up. In recognition of his efforts, he was the recipient of the 1987 Lester Patrick Trophy for his "contribution to ice hockey in the United States."

== Legacy ==
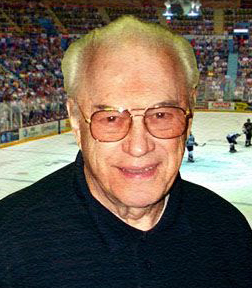
Mathers in the 2000s

In 1992, Mathers was inducted into the builders' category of the Hockey Hall of Fame. In 1994, Mathers was named an honorary life member of the AHL's Board of Governors and was the namesake of a league-wide trophy. In 1996, the Frank Mathers Trophy was awarded for the first time to the winner of the Eastern Conference regular season championship. Following his death, the league inducted him into the AHL Hall of Fame and the Bears retired number 3 in his honor.

Mathers was inducted into the Manitoba Sports Hall of Fame in 2009.

== Career statistics ==
=== Regular season and playoffs ===
			Regular season					Playoffs
Season	Team	League	GP	G	A	Pts	PIM	GP	G	A	Pts	PIM
1942–43	Winnipeg Rangers	MJHL	10	7	8	15	0	—	—	—	—	—
1943–44	Regina Commandos	RNDHL	4	5	5	10	2	1	2	3	5	0
1943–44	Regina Pats	M-Cup	—	—	—	—	—	1	1	2	3	0
1945–46	Ottawa Senators	QSHL	27	3	9	12	10	4	2	0	2	8
1946–47	Ottawa Senators	QSHL	36	5	7	12	27	10	5	1	6	12
1947–48	Ottawa Senators	QSHL	58	16	32	48	48	12	4	5	9	12
1948–49	Toronto Maple Leafs	NHL	15	1	2	3	2	—	—	—	—	—
1948–49	Pittsburgh Hornets	AHL	46	7	23	30	50	—	—	—	—	—
1949–50	Toronto Maple Leafs	NHL	6	0	1	1	2	—	—	—	—	—
1949–50	Pittsburgh Hornets	AHL	58	3	20	23	28	—	—	—	—	—
1950–51	Pittsburgh Hornets	AHL	70	7	17	24	74	13	2	10	12	6
1951–52	Toronto Maple Leafs	NHL	2	0	0	0	0	—	—	—	—	—
1951–52	Pittsburgh Hornets	AHL	66	5	43	48	59	8	1	0	1	8
1952–53	Pittsburgh Hornets	AHL	55	8	26	34	46	10	1	4	5	18
1953–54	Pittsburgh Hornets	AHL	69	9	43	52	73	5	0	2	2	12
1954–55	Pittsburgh Hornets	AHL	62	10	30	40	38	10	2	3	5	0
1955–56	Pittsburgh Hornets	AHL	64	12	51	63	61	4	1	2	3	2
1956–57	Hershey Bears	AHL	49	1	15	16	51	7	1	2	3	6
1957–58	Hershey Bears	AHL	64	1	28	29	42	11	1	5	6	4
1958–59	Hershey Bears	AHL	64	1	22	23	62	3	0	1	1	0
1959–60	Hershey Bears	AHL	57	2	12	14	24	—	—	—	—	—
1960–61	Hershey Bears	AHL	62	1	7	8	22	8	0	5	5	2
1961–62	Hershey Bears	AHL	13	0	3	3	6	7	0	1	1	6
AHL totals			799	67	340	407	636	86	9	35	44	64
NHL totals			23	1	3	4	4	—	—	—	—	—

Awards
Preceded by Vic Stasiuk	Winner of the Louis A.R. Pieri Memorial Award; 1968–1969	Succeeded by Fred Shero
