= Church Russell =

Canadian ice hockey player

- Born: March 16, 1923 Winnipeg, Manitoba, Canada
- Died: March 31, 1999 (aged 76)
- Height: 5 ft 11 in (180 cm)
- Weight: 175 lb (79 kg; 12 st 7 lb)
- Position: Centre
- Shot: Left
- Played for: New York Rangers
- Playing career: 1943–1955

Churchill Davidson Russell (March 16, 1923 – March 31, 1999) was a Canadian professional ice hockey player. Russell played 90 games in the National Hockey League (NHL) for the New York Rangers over three seasons between 1945 and 1947. The rest of his career, which lasted from 1943 to 1955, was spent in various minor leagues.

== Playing career ==
Born in Winnipeg, Manitoba, Russell played junior hockey for the Winnipeg Rangers from 1940 to 1943. In his final season, Russell helped his team win the Memorial Cup junior ice hockey championship. Russell played one season for the Victoria Navy team, then served in the military during World War II.

Upon his return in 1945, Russell was signed by the New York Rangers organization. He started with the New York Rovers but played 17 games for the Rangers in 1945–46. The following season, he played for the Rangers, scoring 20 goals and 8 assists. In 1947–48, he played only 19 games for the Rangers.

In 1947, the Rangers traded him to the Cleveland Barons for George Johnston. Russell played two seasons for the Barons, then moved on to the Pittsburgh Hornets for one season and the minor-league Vancouver Canucks for a season. He played in some playoff games the next season for the Winnipeg Maroons. He did not play for two seasons, then played a final eight games for the Brandon Wheat Kings senior ice hockey team in the 1954–55 season to finish his playing career.

== Career statistics ==
=== Regular season and playoffs ===
| | | | Regular season | | | | | Playoffs |
| Season | Team | League | GP | G | A | Pts | PIM | GP | G | A | Pts | PIM |
|---|---|---|---|---|---|---|---|---|---|---|---|---|
| 1940–41 | Winnipeg Rangers | MJHL | — | — | — | — | — | — | — | — | — | — |
| 1941–42 | Winnipeg Rangers | MJHL | 18 | 6 | 11 | 17 | 0 | — | — | — | — | — |
| 1942–43 | Winnipeg Rangers | MJHL | 12 | 23 | 13 | 36 | 0 | 6 | 16 | 4 | 20 | 2 |
| 1943–44 | Victoria Navy | PCHL | 15 | 4 | 6 | 10 | 4 | — | — | — | — | — |
| 1945–46 | New York Rangers | NHL | 17 | 0 | 5 | 5 | 2 | — | — | — | — | — |
| 1945–46 | New York Rovers | EAHL | 38 | 27 | 43 | 70 | 4 | — | — | — | — | — |
| 1946–47 | New York Rangers | NHL | 54 | 20 | 8 | 28 | 8 | — | — | — | — | — |
| 1947–48 | New York Rangers | NHL | 19 | 0 | 3 | 3 | 2 | — | — | — | — | — |
| 1947–48 | New York Rovers | QSHL | 2 | 0 | 0 | 0 | 0 | — | — | — | — | — |
| 1947–48 | Cleveland Barons | AHL | 40 | 13 | 18 | 31 | 8 | 9 | 3 | 5 | 8 | 0 |
| 1948–49 | Cleveland Barons | AHL | 56 | 17 | 22 | 39 | 10 | 5 | 1 | 1 | 2 | 2 |
| 1949–50 | Pittsburgh Hornets | AHL | 67 | 7 | 22 | 29 | 15 | — | — | — | — | — |
| 1950–51 | Vancouver Canucks | PCHL | 58 | 12 | 21 | 33 | 8 | — | — | — | — | — |
| 1951–52 | Winnipeg Maroons | Al-Cup | — | — | — | — | — | 6 | 5 | 4 | 9 | 2 |
| 1952–53 | Winnipeg Maroons | Al-Cup | — | — | — | — | — | 4 | 1 | 1 | 2 | 5 |
| 1953–54 | Brandon Regals | MHL | — | — | — | — | — | — | — | — | — | — |
| 1954–55 | Brandon Regals | MHL | 8 | 5 | 4 | 9 | 2 | — | — | — | — | — |
| AHL totals | | | 163 | 37 | 62 | 99 | 33 | 14 | 4 | 6 | 10 | 2 |
| NHL totals | | | 90 | 20 | 16 | 36 | 12 | — | — | — | — | — |

== Awards and achievements ==
- Memorial Cup Championship (1943)
- EAHL First All-Star Team (1946)
- Honoured Member of the Manitoba Hockey Hall of Fame
