= St. Boniface Canadiens =

Manitoba former ice hockey team

- City: Winnipeg, Manitoba
- League: Manitoba Junior Hockey League
- Operated: 1952-1964

Franchise history
- 1935-1936: Woodhaven Maple Leafs
- 1936-1945: St. James Canadians
- 1945-1946: St. James Orioles
- 1946-1952: Winnipeg Canadiens
- 1952-1964: St. Boniface Canadiens
- 1964-1967: Winnipeg Warriors
- 1967-1976: West Kildonan North Stars
- 1976-1990: Kildonan North Stars

The St. Boniface Canadiens was a Manitoba Junior Hockey League team that operated from 1952-1964. The St. Boniface Canadiens won four Turnbull Cup Championships as Manitoba Junior Champions, 1953, 1954, 1956, and 1958.

The franchise was founded in 1935 and moved from Winnipeg to St. Boniface, Manitoba in 1952. It had previously played as the Woodhaven Maple Leafs, St. James Canadians, St. James Orioles, and Winnipeg Canadiens.

The 1953 St. Boniface Canadiens won the Abbott Cup as western Canadian champions by defeating the Lethbridge Native Sons. They played the 1953 Memorial Cup final against the Barrie Flyers, losing the best-of-seven series in six games. The 1953 Canadiens were inducted into the Manitoba Hockey Hall of Fame in the team category.

The Canadiens became the Winnipeg Warriors from 1964 to 1967.

During the summer of 1967, community-minded sports group purchased the Winnipeg Warriors from Ben Hatskin; after the sale, the team became known as the Kildonan North Stars.

== Season-by-season record ==
Note: GP = Games Played, W = Wins, L = Losses, T = Ties, OTL = Overtime Losses, GF = Goals for, GA = Goals against

Season	GP	W	L	T	OTL	GF	GA	Points	Finish	Playoffs
1935-36	12	1	10	1	-	32	59	13	8th MJHL	
1936-37	16	6	9	1	-	72	97	13	6th MJHL	
1937-38	16	4	9	3	-	70	119	11	7th MJHL	
1938-39	18	8	9	1	-	77	73	17	4th MJHL	
1939-40	18	8	10	0	-	--	--	16	6th MJHL	
1940-41	11	2	9	0	-	47	92	4	8th MJHL	
1941-42	18	9	9	0	-	106	107	18	4th MJHL	
1942-43	16	6	10	0	-	82	89	12	6th MJHL	
1943-44	10	4	6	0	-	36	48	10	4th MJHL	Won League
1944-45	9	3	6	0	-	56	69	6	4th MJHL	
1945-46	10	7	3	0	-	59	57	14	3rd MJHL	
1946-47	16	6	10	0	-	59	93	12	4th MJHL	
1947-48	24	15	7	2	-	137	99	32	1st MJHL	
1948-49	30	12	17	1	-	136	160	25	2nd MJHL	
1949-50	36	13	22	1	-	141	175	27	4th MJHL	
1950-51	36	8	28	0	-	129	206	16	4th MJHL	
1951-52	36	18	17	1	-	131	112	37	3rd MJHL	
1952-53	36	22	13	1	-	179	120	45	2nd MJHL	Won League, Won AbC
1953-54	36	31	3	2	-	225	128	64	1st MJHL	Won League
1954-55	32	13	18	1	-	187	154	27	3rd MJHL	
1955-56	23	15	7	1	-	175	114	31	2nd MJHL	Won League
1956-57	30	26	4	0	-	260	100	52	1st MJHL	
1957-58	30	17	11	2	-	146	132	36	2nd MJHL	Won League
1958-59	31	21	8	2	-	143	96	44	2nd MJHL	
1959-60	31	21	9	1	-	140	93	43	2nd MJHL	
1960-61	32	10	21	1	-	141	191	21	4th MJHL	
1961-62	40	17	17	6	-	135	152	40	3rd MJHL	
1962-63	39	19	16	4	-	186	148	42	2nd MJHL	
1963-64	30	1	28	1	-	97	210	3	6th MJHL	
1964-65	44	13	27	4	-	152	222	30	4th MJHL	
1965-66	48	19	22	7	-	207	229	45	2nd MJHL	
1966-67	58	10	45	3	-	162	390	23	7th MJHL	

== NHL alumni ==
- Garry Blaine
- Gerry Brisson
- Rosie Couture
- Cal Gardner
- Jean Gauthier
- Ted Green
- Andy Hebenton
- Cecil Hoekstra
- Howie Hughes
- Ted Irvine
- Al Johnson
- Gord Labossiere
- Ted Lanyon
- Ray Manson
- Bill Masterton
- Ab McDonald
- Cliff Pennington
- Bill Sutherland
- Jerry Wilson
