= Winnipeg Rangers (1939–1957) =

Manitoba former ice hockey team

- City: Winnipeg, Manitoba
- League: Manitoba Junior Hockey League
- Operated: 1939-1957

Franchise history
- 1939-1947: Winnipeg Rangers
- 1947-1952: Winnipeg Black Hawks
- 1952-1957: Winnipeg Barons

Championships
- Playoff championships: 1941, 1943; Memorial Cup Champions

The Winnipeg Rangers, later known as the Black Hawks and Barons, were a Canadian junior hockey team in the Manitoba Junior Hockey League. They were two-time Memorial Cup and Turnbull Cup champions (1941 and 1943).

== History ==
=== 1941 Memorial Cup ===
The 1941 Winnipeg Rangers Hockey Club defeated the Saskatoon Quakers to win the Abbott Cup and earned the right to represent the west in the Memorial Cup. They went on to defeat the Montreal Royals 7–4 in the fifth and deciding game to capture the national title.

The roster of this team included: Baldy Northcott (Coach), Mike Peters (Spare Goal), Hugh Millar (Defence), Glen Harmon (Defence), Bernie Bathgate (Forward), Bill Heindl Sr. (Defence), R.A. "Sammy" Fabro (Forward), Les Hickey (Forward), Bob Ballance (Forward), Hub Macey (Forward), Manning "Babe" Hobday (Defence), Lou Medynski (Forward), Earl Fast (Forward), Doug Baldwin (Defence), Bill Mortimer (Defence), Alan Hay (Forward), Billy Robinson (Forward), and Hal Thompson (Goal), and Tommy Bredin (Forward).

=== 1943 Memorial Cup ===
The 1943 Winnipeg Rangers defeated the Saskatoon Quakers to win the Abbott Cup. They then went on to beat the Oshawa Generals in the sixth game of the best of seven Memorial Cup championship.

The roster of this team included: Vernon Smith (Mascot), Joe Peters, Frank Mathers, Ben Juzda, Jack Irvine, Bill Tindall, Stan Warecki, Ritchie McDonald, Bill Boorman (Captain), George Mundrick, Tom Fowler, Cal Gardner, Jack Taggert, Bill Vickers, Joe Peterson, Church Russell, Ed Kullman, Doug Jackson, Spence Tatchell, Gus Schwartz, Johnny Gross (Trainer), Henry Borger (VP), Arthur Chipman (President), Baldy Northcott (Executive), Bob Kinnear (Coach), and Scotty Oliver (GM).

=== Name ===
The hockey club's affiliation changed from the New York Rangers to the Chicago Black Hawks after the 1946–47 season; as such, the team was renamed the Winnipeg Black Hawks. In 1952, the name was changed again, this time to the Winnipeg Barons. The hockey club folded after the 1956–57 season.

=== Legacy ===
The 1941 and 1943 Winnipeg Rangers have been inducted into the Manitoba Hockey Hall of Fame under the team category.

A separate team called the Winnipeg Rangers played in the MJHL from 1956 to 1967.

== See also ==
- Winnipeg Rangers (1956–67)
