= MJHL All-Star Teams =

This is a list of all-star teams for the Manitoba Junior Hockey League, an ice hockey league based in Manitoba, Canada. There have been all-star teams since 1942.

== From 1941 to 1950 ==
1942 First All-Star Team
Centreman	Lin Bend	Portage Terriers
Rightwinger	Ed Slowinski	Winnipeg Monarchs
1948 Second All-Star Team
Goaltender	Ray Frederick	Brandon Wheat Kings
Defenceman	Joe Crozier	Brandon Wheat Kings
Centreman	Edward Leier	Winnipeg Black Hawks
1949 First All-Star Team
Goaltender	Ray Frederick	Brandon Wheat Kings
Defencemen	Joe Crozier	Brandon Wheat Kings
Defencemen	Bob Chrystal	Brandon Wheat Kings
Centreman	Alf Francis	Brandon Wheat Kings
Leftwinger	Bob Kaye	Winnipeg Monarchs
Rightwinger	Jack McKenzie	Brandon Wheat Kings
Coach	Bill MacKenzie	Brandon Wheat Kings
Manager	Jim Kennedy	Winnipeg Canadians
1949 Second All-Star Team
Goaltender	George Allard	Winnipeg Black Hawks
Defenceman	Milt Swindlehurst	Winnipeg Monarchs
Defencemen (tie)	Jack Bownass	Winnipeg Black Hawks
Defencemen (tie)	Reg Shave	Winnipeg Black Hawks
Centreman	Vic Love	Winnipeg Black Hawks
Leftwinger	Glen Sonmor	Brandon Wheat Kings
Rightwinger	Andy Hebenton	Winnipeg Canadians
Coach	Walter Monson	Winnipeg Monarchs
Manager (tie)	Bill Webber	Winnipeg Black Hawks
Manager (tie)	Glen Sutherland	Brandon Wheat Kings
1950 First All-Star Team
Goaltender	Laurie Brethauer	Winnipeg Black Hawks
Defencemen	Ron Robertson	Winnipeg Canadians
Defencemen	Bob Chrystal	Brandon Wheat Kings
Centreman	Reg Abbott	Brandon Wheat Kings
Leftwinger	Gus Juckes	Brandon Wheat Kings
Rightwinger	Elliot Chorley	Winnipeg Monarchs
Coach	Les Cunningham	Brandon Wheat Kings
Manager	Barney Mollot	Brandon Wheat Kings
1950 Second All-Star Team
Goaltender	George Allard	Brandon Wheat Kings
Defencemen	Jack Bownass	Winnipeg Black Hawks
Defencemen	Chuck Lumsden	Winnipeg Monarchs
Centreman	Ron Castelane	Winnipeg Canadians
Leftwinger	John Warren	Winnipeg Canadians
Rightwinger	Brian Roche	Brandon Wheat Kings
Coach	Walter Monson	Winnipeg Monarchs
Manager	Bill Webber	Winnipeg Black Hawks

== From 1951 to 1960 ==
1951 First All-Star Team
Goaltender	Jim Mattson	Brandon Wheat Kings
Defencemen (3-way tie)	Tom Marshall	Winnipeg Black Hawks
Defencemen (3-way tie)	Bill Burega	Winnipeg Monarchs
Defencemen (3-way tie)	Don Johnston	Winnipeg Monarchs
Centreman	Vic Love	Brandon Wheat Kings
Wingers	Elliot Chorley	Winnipeg Monarchs
Wingers	Ronald Rohmer	Brandon Wheat Kings
Coach	Les Cunningham	Brandon Wheat Kings
Manager	Pat Lyons	Winnipeg Monarchs
1951 Second All-Star Team
Goaltender	Don Dawson	Winnipeg Black Hawks
Defencemen	Dune McLennan	Brandon Wheat Kings
Defencemen	Bill Allison	Brandon Wheat Kings
Centreman	Timmy Young	Brandon Wheat Kings
Wingers	Joe Reichart	Winnipeg Black Hawks
Wingers	Jim Zarie	Winnipeg Monarchs
1952 First All-Star Team
Goaltender	Don Dawson	Winnipeg Black Hawks
Defencemen	Phil Hilton	Brandon Wheat Kings
Defencemen	Don Johnston	Winnipeg Monarchs
Centreman	Del Topoll	Brandon Wheat Kings
Wingers	Murray Wilkie	Brandon Wheat Kings
Wingers	Ken Smith	Winnipeg Black Hawks
Coach	Riley Mullen	Brandon Wheat Kings
Manager	Pat Lyons	Winnipeg Monarchs
1952 Second All-Star Team
Goaltender	Don Collins	Winnipeg Monarchs
Defencemen	Frank Arnett	Brandon Wheat Kings
Defencemen	Syd White	St. Boniface Canadiens
Centreman	Jim Zarie	Winnipeg Monarchs
Wingers	Joe Reichart	Winnipeg Black Hawks
Wingers	Bill Maslanko	Brandon Wheat Kings
1953 First All-Star Team
Goaltender	Julian Klymkiw	Brandon Wheat Kings
Defencemen	Elton Taylor	Winnipeg Monarchs
Defencemen	Bill Short	St. Boniface Canadiens
Centreman	Clare Smith	Brandon Wheat Kings
Leftwinger	Leo Konyk	St. Boniface Canadiens
Rightwinger	Ross Jones	Brandon Wheat Kings
Coach	Walter Monson	Winnipeg Monarchs
Manager	Peter Thompson	Brandon Wheat Kings
1953 Second All-Star Team
Goaltender	Don Dawson	Winnipeg Barons
Defenceman	Gord Lawson	Brandon Wheat Kings
Defencemen (tie)	Ed Willems	Winnipeg Monarchs
Defencemen (tie)	Frank Holliday	St. Boniface Canadiens
Centreman	Len Thornson	St. Boniface Canadiens
Leftwinger	Bunt Hubchik	Brandon Wheat Kings
Rightwinger	Ab McDonald	St. Boniface Canadiens
Coach	Bill McKenzie	Winnipeg Barons
Manager	Pat Lyon	Winnipeg Monarchs
1955 First All-Star Team
Goaltender	Ted Derrett	Winnipeg Monarchs
Defencemen	Ted Harris	Winnipeg Monarchs
Defencemen	Bob Currie	Winnipeg Monarchs
Centreman	Art Stratton	Winnipeg Barons
Leftwinger	Gerry Wilson	St. Boniface Canadiens
Rightwinger	Gordon Stratton	Winnipeg Barons
1955 Second All-Star Team
Goaltender	Gord Dibley	St. Boniface Canadiens
Defencemen	Gary Bird	Winnipeg Barons
Defencemen	Bert Aikens	St. Boniface Canadiens
Centreman	Bill Sutherland	St. Boniface Canadiens
Leftwinger	Gary Starr	Winnipeg Monarchs
Rightwinger	Curly Melanchuk	Winnipeg Monarchs
1956 First All-Star Team
Centreman	Ray Brunel	St. Boniface Canadiens
1957 First All-Star Team
Centreman	Ray Brunel	St. Boniface Canadiens
1958 First All-Star Team
Goaltender	Ron Mathers	Winnipeg Monarchs
Defencemen	Bill McDowell	Winnipeg Monarchs
Defencemen	Connie Neil	Transcona Rangers
Centreman	Gord Labossiere	Transcona Rangers
Leftwinger	Laurie Langrell	Winnipeg Braves
Rightwinger	Claude Normandeau	St. Boniface Canadiens
Coach	Bill Allum	Winnipeg Braves
Manager	Lloyd Frihager	St. Boniface Canadiens
1958 Second All-Star Team
Goaltender	Don Shalley	St. Boniface Canadiens
Defencemen	Ted Lanyon	St. Boniface Canadiens
Defencemen	Bob Donas	St. Boniface Canadiens
Centreman	Bill Saunders	Winnipeg Monarchs
Leftwinger	Al LeBlanc	Winnipeg Braves
Rightwinger	Bill Colpitts	Winnipeg Monarchs
Coach	Bill Leask	Winnipeg Monarchs
Manager	Ray Frost	Transcona Rangers

== From 1961 to 1970 ==
1964 First All-Star Team
Goaltender	Ken Kachulak	Brandon Wheat Kings
Defencemen	Bob Ash	Brandon Wheat Kings
Defencemen	Jim Murray	Brandon Wheat Kings
Centreman	Felix LaVallee	Brandon Wheat Kings
Leftwinger	Ted Irvine	Winnipeg Braves
Rightwinger	John Vopni	Brandon Wheat Kings
Coach	Ron Maxwell	Brandon Wheat Kings
1964 Second All-Star Team
Goaltender	Ben Harper	Fort Frances Royals
Defencemen (tie)	Terry Ball	Winnipeg Rangers
Defencemen (tie)	Bob Howard	Winnipeg Rangers
Defencemen (tie)	George Hayes	Brandon Wheat Kings
Centreman	Dan Johnson	Fort Frances Royals
Leftwinger	Jim Irving	Winnipeg Rangers
Rightwinger	Freeman Asmundson	Winnipeg Monarchs
1965 First All-Star Team
Goaltender	Wayne Stephenson	Winnipeg Braves
Defencemen	Al Dylcer	Winnipeg Monarchs
Defencemen	Jim Lane	Winnipeg Rangers
Centreman	Ken Sucharski	Winnipeg Warriors
Leftwinger	Doug Overton	Winnipeg Warriors
Rightwinger	Bill Cooper	Winnipeg Warriors
1965 Second All-Star Team
Goaltender	Gary Thornton	Winnipeg Warriors
Defencemen	Mike Kolody	Winnipeg Rangers
Defencemen	Brian Dyck	Winnipeg Braves
Centreman	Bill Heindl Jr.	Winnipeg Braves
Leftwinger	Dunc Rousseau	Winnipeg Braves
Rightwinger	George Anderson	Winnipeg Braves
1966 First All-Star Team
Goaltender	George Surmay	Winnipeg Rangers
Defencemen	Gord Malinosk	Brandon Wheat Kings
Defencemen	Mel Shewchuk	Winnipeg Warriors
Centreman	Terry Jones	Winnipeg Rangers
Leftwinger	Brent McLean	Winnipeg Monarchs
Rightwinger	Bob Anderson	Winnipeg Rangers
Coach	Jack Bownass	Winnipeg Rangers
1966 Second All-Star Team
Goaltender	Bob Tole	Winnipeg Monarchs
Defencemen	Tom Freeman	Winnipeg Rangers
Defencemen	Jim Woloshyn	Winnipeg Braves
Centreman	Ken Sucharski	Winnipeg Braves
Leftwinger	Glen Beckett	Winnipeg Rangers
Rightwinger	George Anderson	Winnipeg Braves
1967 First All-Star Team
Goaltender	Chris Worthy	Flin Flon Bombers
Defencemen	Gerry Hart	Flin Flon Bombers
Defencemen	Jim Pritchard	Winnipeg Monarchs
Centreman	Bobby Clarke	Flin Flon Bombers
Leftwinger	Cal Swenson	Brandon Wheat Kings
Rightwinger	Reggie Leach	Flin Flon Bombers
Coach	Ed Dorohoy	Brandon Wheat Kings
1967 Second All-Star Team
Goaltender	George Surmay	Winnipeg Rangers
Defencemen	Jack Criel	Flin Flon Bombers
Defencemen	Larry Brown	Brandon Wheat Kings
Centreman	Juha Widing	Brandon Wheat Kings
Leftwinger	Murray Klein	Winnipeg Rangers
Rightwinger	Bill Fairbairn	Brandon Wheat Kings
1968 First All-Star Team
Goaltender	Alan Hanna	Winnipeg Monarchs
Defencemen	Jim Trosky	St. Boniface Saints
Defencemen	Al White	Winnipeg Monarchs
Centreman	Wayne Chernecki	West Kildonan North Stars
Leftwinger (tie)	Andy Van Hellemond	St. James Canadians
Leftwinger (tie)	Brian Howie	West Kildonan North Stars
Rightwinger	Brian Stephenson	Winnipeg Monarchs
1968 Second All-Star Team
Goaltender	Allan Loewen	St. James Canadians
Defencemen	Ken Friesen	St. Boniface Saints
Defencemen	Jim Gair	West Kildonan North Stars
Centreman	Chris Oddleifson	Winnipeg Monarchs
Wingers	Jim Malcolm	Winnipeg Monarchs
Wingers	Andy Miles	Winnipeg Monarchs

== From 1971 to 1980 ==
1971 First All-Star Team
Goaltender	Curt Ridley	Portage Terriers
1973 First All-Star Team
Defence	Chuck Luksa	Kenora Muskies
Left Wing	Charlie Simmer	Kenora Muskies
1973 Second All-Star Team
Goaltender	Murray Bannerman	St. James Canadians
1977 First All-Star Team
Goaltender	Jim Tkachyk	Dauphin Kings
Defencemen	Mark Johnston	Portage Terriers
Defencemen	Dan Bryck	Kenora Thistles
Centreman	Ken Krentz	Selkirk Steelers
Leftwinger	Dale Maksymyk	Selkirk Steelers
Rightwinger	Jim Misener	Dauphin Kings
Coach	Phil Fafard	Kenora Thistles
Manager	Steve Hawrysh	Dauphin Kings
Trainer	Daryl Steen	St. Boniface Saints

== From 1981 to 1990 ==
First All-Star Team
1981	Forward	Darren Boyko	St. Boniface Saints			
1982	Defence	Grant Ledyard	Fort Garry Blues			
1983	Forward	Mike Ridley	St. Boniface Saints			
1986	Goaltender	Ed Belfour	Winkler Flyers | 1990	Goaltender	Robin Cook	Winkler Flyers

1986 // Goaltender // Ron Cossette // Wpg South Blues

== From 1991 to 2000 ==
1992 First All-Star Team
Goaltender	Robin Cook	Winkler Flyers
1994 First All-Star Team
Goaltender	Ryan Tempel	St. Boniface Saints
Defencemen	Laird Lidster	Portage Terriers
Defencemen	Cory Francis	St. Boniface Saints
Forwards	Ryan Smith	St. James Canadians
Forwards	Jason Gudmundson	Winkler Flyers
Forwards	Darcy Pelletier	Southeast Blades
1995 First All-Star Team
Defenceman	Troy Christensen	Winnipeg Saints
Forward	Cory Cyrenne	Winnipeg Saints
1996 First All-Star Team
Goaltender	Duane Hoey	Winnipeg Saints
Defenceman	Troy Christensen	Winnipeg Saints
Forward	Mike Dick	Winkler Flyers
1996 Second All-Star Team
Defenceman	Ryan Vermette	Winnipeg Saints
1997 First All-Star Team
Goaltender	Eric Pateman	Winkler Flyers
1998 First All-Star Team
Goaltender	Eric Pateman	Winkler Flyers
1999 Second All-Star Team
Goaltender	Rej Lagace	Winkler Flyers
2000 First All-Star Team
Forward	Junior Lessard	Portage Terriers
2000 Second All-Star Team
Goaltender	Rej Lagace	Winkler Flyers

== From 2001 ==
2001 First All-Star Team
Defencemen	Derek Miller	Neepawa Natives
Forward	Andrew Murray	Selkirk Steelers
2001 Second All-Star Team
Goaltender	Rej Lagace	Winkler Flyers
2002 First All-Star Team
Defenceman	Steve Mullin	Winkler Flyers
2002 Second All-Star Team
Goaltender	Ian Vigier	Winkler Flyers
Defenceman	Steve Later	Winnipeg South Blues
Forward	Ross Oldcorn	Winkler Flyers
2003 First All-Star Team
Defencemen	Colin Tetrault	Southeast Blades
Defencemen	Jamie Dowhayko	Selkirk Steelers
2004 First All-Star Team
Goaltender	Greg Goodwin	Neepawa Natives
Forwards	Jordan Pietrus	Winnipeg Saints
Forwards	Aaron Starr	OCN Blizzard
Forwards	Michael Young	OCN Blizzard
2004 Second All-Star Team
Goaltender	Pierre-Olivier Girouard	OCN Blizzard
Defencemen	Jared Lang	OCN Blizzard
Forwards	Josh Froese	Winkler Flyers
Forwards	Cory Baldwin	Dauphin Kings
Forwards	Cliff Ketchen	Portage Terriers
2005 First All-Star Team
Goaltender	Brett Koscielny	Dauphin Kings
Defencemen	Devrin Stonehouse	Neepawa Natives
Defencemen	Kip Workman	Portage Terriers
Forwards	Ryan Garbutt	Winnipeg South Blues
Forwards	Steve Haddon	Portage Terriers
2005 Second All-Star Team
Goaltender	Stefan Drew	Portage Terriers
Forward	Josh Froese	Winkler Flyers
2006 First All-Star Team
Goaltender	Justin Harris	Selkirk Steelers
Defenceman	Ryan Constant	OCN Blizzard
Forward	Tyler Czuba	Swan Valley Stampeders
2006 Second All-Star Team
Defenceman	David Anning	Winnipeg Saints
2007 First All-Star Team
Goaltender	Brant Hilton	Winnipeg South Blues
Defencemen	Wade Poplawski	Winnipeg South Blues
Defencemen	Jeff Penner	Dauphin Kings
Forwards	Kyle Howarth	Selkirk Steelers
Forwards	Brent Howarth	Selkirk Steelers
Forwards	Matt Summers	OCN Blizzard
2007 Second All-Star Team
Goaltender	Shawn Monette	Dauphin Kings
Defencemen	Andrew Fernandez	Selkirk Steelers
Defencemen	Tyler Harder	Dauphin Kings
Forwards	Adam Sergerie	Selkirk Steelers
Forwards	Ian Lowe	Swan Valley Stampeders
Forwards	Lem Randall	OCN Blizzard
2008 First All-Star Team
Goaltender	Gavin McHale	Portage Terriers
Defencemen	Jason Gray	Winnipeg South Blues
Defencemen	Brock Turner	Waywayseecappo Wolverines
Forwards	Bryan Kauk	Dauphin Kings
Forwards	Matt Gingera	Winnipeg Saints
Forwards	Jeremy Dawes	Portage Terriers
2008 Second All-Star Team
Goaltender	Alan Armour	Selkirk Steelers
Defencemen	A.J. Spiller	Portage Terriers
Defencemen	Drew Ellement	Winnipeg South Blues
Forwards	Russ Payne	Selkirk Steelers
Forwards	Sean Collins	Waywayseecappo Wolverines
Forwards	Adam Pleskach	Selkirk Steelers
