= Kim Davis Trophy =

Manitoba Junior Hockey League award

The Kim Davis Trophy is an annual award given to the player selected as the most proficient in his first year of competition in the Manitoba Junior Hockey League during the regular season. The trophy is named after former MJHL commissioner Kim Davis.

== History ==
The Rookie of the Year award was created in 1950. From 1967 to 1977, the award winner was presented the Gordon Petrie Memorial Trophy and from 1978 to 2022 was named the Vince Leah Trophy. Vince Leah was a sportswriter for The Winnipeg Tribune and the Winnipeg Free Press, founded the Excelsior Hockey Club in 1934, which produced forty future professional hockey players and won thirteen provincial championships.

The current award was first awarded for the 2022–23 MJHL season.

== Recipients ==
Season	Winner	Team
2015	James Shearer	Steinbach Pistons
2014	Tyler Jeanson	Portage Terriers
2013	Tristan Keck	Winkler Flyers
2012	Tanner Jago	Winkler Flyers
2011	Bryn Chyzyk	Dauphin Kings
2010	Brendan O'Donnell	Winnipeg South Blues
2009	Jordan DePape	Winnipeg Saints
2008	Stephan Vigier	Swan Valley Stampeders
2007	Aaron Lewadniuk	Winkler Flyers
2006	Jason Gregoire	Winnipeg South Blues
2005	Matt Ostash	Winkler Flyers
2004	Mark Magnowski	Winnipeg Saints
2003	Andrew Jackman	Portage Terriers
2002	Blaine Jarvis	Neepawa Natives
2001	Mark Agnew	Swan Valley Stampeders
2000	D.J. Huver	St. James Canadians
1997	Tyler Arnason	Winnipeg South Blues
1994	Cory Cyrenne	St. Boniface Saints
1977	Bruno Rogger	Brandon Travellers
1976	Anthony Gurniak	West Kildonan North Stars
1975	Ken Krentz	Selkirk Steelers
1972	Calvin Kitching	St. James Canadians
1971	Bill Kriski	St. Boniface Saints
1970	Frank Turnbull	Winnipeg Monarchs
1969	Jim Cahoon	Dauphin Kings
1968	Wayne Chernecki	West Kildonan North Stars
1967	Bobby Clarke	Flin Flon Bombers
1966	Chuck Lefley	Winnipeg Rangers
1965	Bill Ramsay	Winnipeg Monarchs
1963	Ken Kachulak	Brandon Wheat Kings
1960	George Hill	Brandon Wheat Kings
