= 1974–75 MJHL season =

Manitoba ice hockey season

== Champion ==
On April 9, 1975, at home in Selkirk, the Steelers won their second consecutive MJHL title, capturing the Turnbull Memorial Trophy. On April 16, 1975, in Swift Current, the Steelers beat the hometown Broncos of the Saskatchewan Junior Hockey League to win the Anavet Cup.

== League notes ==
Jim Misener of the Dauphin Kings led the league in goals with 73, breaking Bobby Clarke's single season record of 71.

== Regular season ==
North Division	GP	W	L	T	Pts	GF	GA
Selkirk Steelers	48	35	12	1	71	283	175
Portage Terriers	48	25	22	1	51	223	209
Dauphin Kings	48	25	23	0	50	289	277
Kenora Muskies	48	15	33	0	30	243	331
Brandon Travellers	48	13	25	0	26	208	314

South Division	GP	W	L	T	Pts	GF	GA
West Kildonan North Stars	48	30	16	2	62	289	212
St. James Canadians	48	29	19	0	58	281	238
St. Boniface Saints	48	23	25	0	46	234	251
Winnipeg Monarchs	48	19	29	0	38	244	286

== Playoffs ==
Division Semi-Finals

Portage defeated Dauphin
St. James defeated St. Boniface 4-games-to-none

Divisional Finals

Selkirk defeated Portage 4-games-to-1
West Kildonan defeated St. James 4-games-to-2

Turnbull Cup Championship

Selkirk defeated West Kildonan 4-games-to-3

Anavet Cup Championship

Selkirk defeated Swift Current Broncos (SJHL) 4-games-to-none

Abbott Cup Championship

Selkirk lost to Spruce Grove Mets (AJHL) 4-games-to-2

== Awards ==
Trophy	Winner	Team
MVP		
Top Goaltender		
Rookie of the Year	Ken Krentz	Selkirk Steelers
Hockey Ability & Sportsmanship Award		
Scoring Champion	Jim Misener	Dauphin Kings
Most Goals	Jim Misener	Dauphin Kings
Coach of the Year		
