= 1973–74 MJHL season =

Manitoba ice hockey season

In Winnipeg on April 5, 1974, the Selkirk Steelers won the MJHL title claiming the Turnbull Memorial Trophy. There was no stopping the Selkirk Steelers on April 19, 1974, in Prince Albert, as the Steelers defeated the Prince Albert Raiders of the Saskatchewan Junior Hockey League winning the Anavet Cup. On May 1, 1974, with a 5-2 win over Kelowna Buckaroos of the British Columbia Hockey League in the seventh and deciding game, held in Kelowna, the Steelers captured the Abbott Cup and advanced into the national final for the Centennial Cup. In the seventh and deciding game, on May 14, 1974, in Ottawa, the Selkirk Steelers scored a dramatic 1-0 overtime victory over the Smiths Falls Bears of the Central Junior A Hockey League to capture the Centennial Cup, emblematic of junior A hockey supremacy in Canada.

== League notes ==
The MJHL returns to Brandon, as the Brandon Travellers join the North Division. The Travellers were owned and operated by the Brandon Wheat Kings of the Western Canada Hockey League.

The 1974 Selkirk Steelers were inducted into the Manitoba Hockey Hall of Fame.

== Regular season ==
North Division	GP	W	L	T	Pts	GF	GA
Selkirk Steelers	48	32	15	1	65	245	182
Brandon Travellers	48	31	16	1	63	225	174
Portage Terriers	48	29	18	1	59	225	201
Dauphin Kings	48	15	32	1	31	206	278
Kenora Muskies	48	10	38	0	20	200	343

South Division	GP	W	L	T	Pts	GF	GA
West Kildonan North Stars	48	33	14	1	67	274	188
St. Boniface Saints	48	28	18	2	58	228	188
St. James Canadians	48	19	27	2	40	216	223
Winnipeg Monarchs	48	14	33	1	29	180	252

== All-Star game ==
The Manitoba Junior Hockey League All-Stars took a 3-0 lead in the first period and then received a lesson in the Finnish technique of playing hockey as the Finnish National Juniors skated away to a 6-3 victory at the Winnipeg Arena Thursday night, December 20.Carl Haney opened the scoring at the 0:31 second mark with an unassisted goal, John Mazur then made it 2-0 at 14:17 and 52 seconds later Don Hansford completed the Manitoba club's scoring. Finland's Jarmo Haellfors scored a power-play goal at 18:24 and Jonni Rinne completed a neat three-way passing play 17 seconds later and the first period ended 3-2. Rinne scored his second goal of the game at 3:29 of the second period to tie the game and that's the way the second period ended. In the final period, the Finns dominated every aspect of the game, scoring three unanswered goals. Kari Eloranta gave his club the lead and Haellfors completed his hat trick with a pair of goals.

MJHL Lineup:

- Goal: Blaine Peterson (Brandon); Norm Tesluk (West Kildonan); Glen Hanlon (Brandon)
- Defence: Jamie Bannerman (St. James);
- Forwards: Dan Bonar (Portage); Mike Bradbury (Brandon); Bob Clemmens (Kenora);
  Jim Gustafson (Kenora); Carl Haney (Kenora); Gary Kaluzniak (Selkirk);
  John Mazur (St. Boniface); Murray McCarthy (St. James); Bob Miller (Portage);
  Jim Misener (Dauphin); Marlin Vanrobaeys (Selkirk); Keith Yann (Winnipeg)
- Doug Overton, Coach; Doug Clarke, Assistant Coach (Brandon)

== Playoffs ==
Division Semi-Finals

Brandon lost to Portage 4-games-to-2
St. Boniface defeated St. James 4-games-to-2

Divisional Finals

Selkirk defeated Portage 4-games-to-3
West Kildonan defeated St. Boniface 4-games-to-none

Turnbull Cup Championship

West Kildonan lost to Selkirk 4-games-to-1

Anavet Cup Championship

Selkirk defeated Prince Albert Raiders (SJHL) 4-games-to-2

Abbott Cup Championship

Selkirk defeated Kelowna Buckaroos (BCHL) 4-games-to-3

Centennial Cup Championship

Selkirk defeated Smiths Falls Bears (CJHL) 4-games-to-3

== Awards ==
Trophy	Winner	Team
MVP	Mark Izzard	West Kildonan North Stars
Top Goaltender	Andy Stoesz	Selkirk Steelers
Rookie of the Year		
Hockey Ability & Sportsmanship Award	Gord Lidstone	West Kildonan North Stars
Scoring Champion	Steve Ford	Portage Terriers
Most Goals	Murray McCarthy	St. James Canadians
Coach of the Year		
