= 1975–76 MJHL season =

Manitoba ice hockey season

== Champion ==
On April 2, 1976, at home in Selkirk, the Steelers won the MJHL title for the third consecutive year, capturing the Turnbull Memorial Trophy.

== League notes ==
The MJHL expands to Thompson, the Thompson King Miners join the league's North Division. Kenora Muskies will shift to the South Division. A pair of teams change their names, the Winnipeg Monarchs become the Assiniboine Park Monarchs and the Kenora Muskies are renamed the Kenora Thistles, in honor of the Stanley Cup winning team.

== Regular season ==
North Division	GP	W	L	T	Pts	GF	GA
Selkirk Steelers	52	29	23	0	58	318	277
Brandon Travellers	52	27	23	2	56	271	237
Portage Terriers	52	25	27	0	50	236	245
Dauphin Kings	52	23	29	0	46	256	268
Thompson King Miners	52	14	38	0	28	188	299

South Division	GP	W	L	T	Pts	GF	GA
West Kildonan North Stars	52	34	18	0	68	287	243
St. Boniface Saints	52	30	18	4	64	244	209
St. James Canadians	52	29	22	1	59	259	227
Assiniboine Park Monarchs	52	27	24	1	55	253	255
Kenora Thistles	52	16	32	4	36	253	317

== Playoffs ==
Division Semi-Finals

Selkirk defeated Dauphin 4-games-to-1
Brandon defeated Portage 4-games-to-1
West Kildonan defeated Assiniboine Park 4-games-to-1
St. Boniface lost to St. James 4-games-to-1

Divisional Finals

Selkirk defeated Brandon 4-games-to-1
West Kildonan defeated St James 4-games-to-3

Turnbull Cup Championship

West Kildonan lost to Selkirk 4-games-to-none

Anavet Cup Championship

Selkirk lost to Prince Albert Raiders (SJHL) 4-games-to-1

== Awards ==
Trophy	Winner	Team
MVP	Darryl Einarson	Selkirk Steelers
Top Goaltender		
Rookie of the Year	Anthony Gurniak	West Kildonan North Stars
Hockey Ability & Sportsmanship Award		
Scoring Champion	Ken Krentz	Selkirk Steelers
Most Goals	Ken Krentz	Selkirk Steelers
Coach of the Year		
