= 2007–08 MJHL season =

Manitoba ice hockey season

- League: Manitoba Junior Hockey League
- Sport: Ice hockey
- Games: 341
- Teams: 11

Regular Season
- First Place: Selkirk Steelers

Playoffs
- Addison Division champions: Winnipeg Saints
- Sherwood Division champions: Portage Terriers

Turnbull Cup
- Champions: Portage Terriers

List of MJHL seasons
- ← 2006–07 2008–09 →

The 2007–08 season was the Manitoba Junior Hockey League's (MJHL) 91st season of operation.

== Season highlights ==
- The Southeast Blades are sold and relocated from Sagkeeng First Nation to Beausejour, Manitoba. The team is renamed the Beausejour Blades.
- 2008 NHL entry draft: Sean Collins of Waywayseecappo Wolverines is selected 187 overall by the Columbus Blue Jackets.

== Standings ==
Addison Division	GP	W	L	OTL	SOL	Pts	GF	GA
Selkirk Steelers	62	44	12	1	5	94	260	168
Winnipeg Saints	62	45	14	1	2	93	345	191
Winnipeg South Blues	62	38	17	5	2	83	260	228
Winkler Flyers	62	33	23	2	4	72	235	224
Beausejour Blades	62	7	50	1	4	19	165	400
Sherwood Division	GP	W	L	OTL	SOL	Pts	GF	GA
Portage Terriers	62	42	15	0	5	89	278	188
Waywayseecappo Wolverines	62	37	23	1	1	76	302	210
Dauphin Kings	62	32	28	2	0	66	241	239
Swan Valley Stampeders	62	25	28	5	4	59	219	273
OCN Blizzard	62	22	36	4	0	48	204	272
Neepawa Natives	62	16	40	4	2	38	172	288

== Playoffs ==
Quarter Finals
1	Selkirk	1
2	Winkler	4
Addison Division
2	Winnipeg	4
3	Winnipeg South	1
1	Portage	4
4	Swan Valley	2
Sherwood Division
2	Waywayseecappo	3
3	Dauphin	4

Semi-Finals
4	Winkler	1
2	Winnipeg	4
2	Portage	4
3	Dauphin	0

Turnbull Cup Finals
2	Winnipeg	1
1	Portage	4

=== Post MJHL playoffs ===
Anavet Cup

- Portage Terriers defeated by the Humboldt Broncos from the SJHL 4-games-to-0.

== League awards ==
- Steve "Boomer" Hawrysh Award (MVP): Bryan Kauk, Dauphin
- MJHL Top Goaltender Award: Gavin McHale, Portage
- Brian Kozak Award (Top Defenceman): Jason Gray, Winnipeg South
- Vince Leah Trophy (Rookie of the Year): Stephan Vigier, Swan Valley
- Lorne Lyndon Memorial Trophy (Hockey Ability and Sportsmanship): Sean Collins, Waywayyseecappo
- Muzz McPherson Award (Coach of the Year): Blake Spiller, Portage
- Mike Ridley Trophy (Scoring Champion): Bryan Kauk, Dauphin
- MJHL Playoff MVP: Cody Pollon

=== CJHL awards ===
- CJAHL Player of the Year (MJHL): Stephan Vigier, Swan Valley
