= Wayne Ramsey =

Canadian ice hockey player

- Born: January 31, 1957 (age 68); Hamiota, Manitoba, Canada
- Height: 6 ft 0 in (183 cm)
- Weight: 195 lb (88 kg; 13 st 13 lb)
- Position: Defence
- Shot: Left
- Played for: Buffalo Sabres
- NHL draft: 104th overall, 1977; Buffalo Sabres
- WHA draft: 16th overall, 1977; Indianapolis Racers
- Playing career: 1977–1981

Wayne Ramsey (born January 31, 1957) is a Canadian former professional ice hockey defenceman. He was drafted in the sixth round, 104th overall, by the Buffalo Sabres in the 1977 NHL Amateur Draft; he played two games in the National Hockey League with Buffalo in the 1977–78 season, going scoreless. He was also drafted by the World Hockey Association's Indianapolis Racers, but never played in that league.

== Career statistics ==
=== Regular season and playoffs ===
			Regular season					Playoffs
Season	Team	League	GP	G	A	Pts	PIM	GP	G	A	Pts	PIM
1973–74	Brandon Wheat Kings	WCHL	53	1	11	12	37	—	—	—	—	—
1973–74	Brandon Travellers	MJHL	15	0	9	9	35	—	—	—	—	—
1974–75	Brandon Wheat Kings	WCHL	21	1	0	1	17	5	1	2	3	7
1974–75	Brandon Travellers	MJHL	38	11	25	36	42	—	—	—	—	—
1975–76	Brandon Wheat Kings	WCHL	63	11	37	48	75	5	0	2	2	6
1975–76	Brandon Travellers	MJHL	1	0	0	0	2	—	—	—	—	—
1976–77	Brandon Wheat Kings	WCHL	72	16	60	76	136	16	4	16	20	33
1977–78	Buffalo Sabres	NHL	2	0	0	0	0	—	—	—	—	—
1977–78	Hershey Bears	AHL	56	10	18	28	35	—	—	—	—	—
1978–79	Milwaukee Admirals	IHL	3	1	2	3	2	—	—	—	—	—
1978–79	Springfield Indians	AHL	15	4	5	9	8	—	—	—	—	—
1978–79	Toledo Goaldiggers	IHL	61	9	30	39	63	6	0	4	4	6
1979–80	Rochester Americans	AHL	68	6	29	35	58	—	—	—	—	—
1980–81	Port Huron Flags	IHL	61	9	29	38	53	4	1	1	2	4
AHL totals			139	20	52	72	101	—	—	—	—	—
IHL totals			125	19	61	80	118	10	1	5	6	10
NHL totals			2	0	0	0	0	—	—	—	—	—
