= Tim Coulis =

Canadian ice hockey player (born 1958)

- Born: February 24, 1958 (age 68) Kenora, Ontario, Canada
- Height: 6 ft 0 in (183 cm)
- Weight: 200 lb (91 kg; 14 st 4 lb)
- Position: Forward
- Shot: Left Wing
- Played for: Washington Capitals; Minnesota North Stars
- NHL draft: 18th overall, 1978; Washington Capitals
- Playing career: 1979–1988

Timothy W. Coulis (born February 24, 1958) is a Canadian retired ice hockey forward. He played 47 games in the National Hockey League with the Washington Capitals and Minnesota North Stars from 1979 to 1986. The rest of his career, which lasted from 1979 to 1988, was spent in the minor leagues.

== Career ==
Coulis was selected 18th overall by the Washington Capitals in the 1978 NHL entry draft. He would play 19 games with the Capitals and spent most of his tenure with the team in the minor leagues. Coulis also played 28 games for the Minnesota North Stars over three seasons between 1983 and 1986.

== Career statistics ==
=== Regular season and playoffs ===
			Regular season					Playoffs
Season	Team	League	GP	G	A	Pts	PIM	GP	G	A	Pts	PIM
1973–74	Kenora Muskies	MJHL	3	0	0	0	8	—	—	—	—	—
1975–76	Kenora Thistles	MJHL	3	5	1	6	28	—	—	—	—	—
1975–76	Sault Ste. Marie Greyhounds	OMJHL	37	15	18	33	226	4	1	1	2	16
1976–77	Sault Ste. Marie Greyhounds	OMJHL	27	13	20	33	114	—	—	—	—	—
1976–77	St. Catharines Fincups	OMJHL	28	10	22	32	136	14	4	5	9	20
1977–78	Hamilton Fincups	OMJHL	46	27	25	52	203	11	6	3	9	64
1979–80	Washington Capitals	NHL	19	1	2	3	27	—	—	—	—	—
1979–80	Hershey Bears	AHL	47	6	12	18	138	—	—	—	—	—
1980–81	Dallas Black Hawks	CHL	63	16	15	31	149	6	2	1	3	24
1981–82	Dallas Black Hawks	CHL	68	20	32	52	209	9	5	1	6	92
1983–84	Minnesota North Stars	NHL	2	0	0	0	4	—	—	—	—	—
1983–84	Salt Lake Golden Eagles	CHL	63	25	35	60	225	4	1	2	3	35
1984–85	Minnesota North Stars	NHL	7	1	1	2	34	3	1	0	1	2
1984–85	Springfield Indians	AHL	52	13	17	30	86	—	—	—	—	—
1985–86	Minnesota North Stars	NHL	19	2	2	4	73	—	—	—	—	—
1985–86	Springfield Indians	AHL	13	5	7	12	42	—	—	—	—	—
1986–87	Springfield Indians	AHL	38	12	19	31	212	—	—	—	—	—
1987–88	Kalamazoo Wings	IHL	18	2	6	8	23	—	—	—	—	—
AHL totals			150	36	55	91	478	—	—	—	—	—
CHL totals			194	61	82	143	583	19	8	4	12	151
NHL totals			47	4	5	9	138	3	1	0	1	2

Preceded by Ryan Walter	Washington Capitals first-round draft pick 1978	Succeeded by Mike Gartner
