= 2008–09 MJHL season =

Manitoba ice hockey season

- League: Manitoba Junior Hockey League
- Sport: Ice hockey
- Games: 341
- Teams: 11

Regular Season
- First Place: Winnipeg Saints

Playoffs
- Addison Division champions: Selkirk Steelers
- Sherwood Division champions: Portage Terriers

Turnbull Cup
- Champions: Portage Terriers

List of MJHL seasons
- ← 2007–08 2009–10 →

The 2008–09 season was the Manitoba Junior Hockey League's (MJHL) 92nd season of operation.

== Season highlights ==
- The MJHL adopted the crossover format for the playoffs. In this format the top 8 teams make it to the playoffs regardless of the division.

== Standings ==
Addison Division	GP	W	L	OTL	SOL	Pts	GF	GA
Winnipeg Saints	62	48	11	0	3	99	381	192
Selkirk Steelers	62	45	17	0	0	90	315	186
Winkler Flyers	62	33	25	2	2	70	285	227
Winnipeg South Blues	62	20	42	0	0	40	195	313
Beausejour Blades	62	6	52	2	2	16	147	424
Sherwood Division	GP	W	L	OTL	SOL	Pts	GF	GA
Portage Terriers	62	46	13	3	0	95	287	195
Dauphin Kings	62	42	16	2	2	88	253	191
OCN Blizzard	62	32	22	5	3	72	214	211
Waywayseecappo Wolverines	62	26	27	3	6	61	192	200
Neepawa Natives	61	24	29	3	5	56	182	237
Swan Valley Stampeders	61	18	39	3	1	40	165	260

== Playoffs ==
Quarter Finals
1	Winnipeg Saints	4
8	Neepawa Natives	0
3	Selkirk Steelers	4
6	Winkler Flyers	2
4	Dauphin Kings	4
5	OCN Blizzard	2
2	Portage Terriers	4
7	Waywayseecappo Wolverines	0

Semi-Finals
1	Winnipeg Saints	2
3	Selkirk Steelers	4
2	Portage Terriers	4
4	Dauphin Kings	0

Turnbull Cup Finals
3	Selkirk Steelers	1
2	Portage Terriers	4

=== Post MJHL playoffs ===
Anavet Cup

- Portage Terriers defeated by the Humboldt Broncos from the SJHL.
