= Misener =

Misener is a surname. Notable people with the surname include:

- Zeola Hershey Misener (1878–1966), American suffragist and one of the first women elected to the Indiana General Assembly
- Dorothy Misener Jurney (1909–2002), American journalist
- Jim Misener (born 1956), Canadian ice hockey player
