= Alfred Francis (disambiguation) =

Alfred Francis was a rugby player.

Alfred or Alf Francis may also refer to:

- Alf Francis, motor racing mechanic
- Alf Francis (ice hockey) in MJHL All-Star Teams
