= Mark Izzard =

Canadian ice hockey player

Mark Izzard (born September 23, 1954 in Winnipeg, Manitoba) is a Canadian former ice hockey centre. Izzard's career spanned a decade, and he played more than 430 total games. His career started with the Winnipeg Jets in 1972 and ended with the Grand Rapids Grizzlies in 1982.

- 1972-73 Winnipeg Jets WCHL
- 1972-73 West Kildonan North Stars MJHL
- 1973-74 Winnipeg Clubs WCHL
- 1973-74 West Kildonan North Stars MJHL
- 1974-75 West Kildonan North Stars MJHL
- 1975-76 Syracuse Blazers NAHL
- 1976-77 Columbus Owls IHL
- 1977-78 Dayton/Grand Rapids Owls IHL
- 1978-79 Grand-Rapids Owls IHL
- 1979-80 Grand-Rapids Owls IHL
- 1980-81 Grand-Rapids Grizzlies CnHL
- 1981-82 Grand-Rapids Grizzlies CnHL

After his playing career ended, Izzard worked with the Grand Rapids Amateur Hockey Association (G.R.A.H.A.) for over 10 years as the director of hockey operations and as a coach.

After leaving G.R.A.H.A., Izzard went to work for the Grand Rapids Griffins of the American Hockey League (AHL). During his career with the Griffins, he was a director of the youth foundation.

Currently, Izzard resides in Grand Rapids, Michigan and owns a company doing home repair and construction.
