= Steinbach Hawks =

Manitoba former ice hockey team

- City: Steinbach, Manitoba
- League: Manitoba Junior Hockey League
- Operated: 1985-1988
- Home arena: Steinbach Centennial Arena (capacity: 1,250)

The Steinbach Hawks were a Canadian junior 'A' ice hockey team based in Steinbach, Manitoba that played in the Manitoba Junior Hockey League (MJHL) from 1985 to 1988.

After only three seasons in the MJHL, the Hawks took leave of absence following the 1987–1988 season and formally ceased operations two years later. The league added the Winnipeg-based Southeast Thunderbirds for the 1988–1989 season to counter the loss of the Hawks. That team eventually relocated to Steinbach in 2009 is today known as the Steinbach Pistons.

== Season-by-season record ==
Note: GP = Games Played, W = Wins, L = Losses, T = Ties, OTL = Overtime Losses, GF = Goals for, GA = Goals against

Season	GP	W	L	T	OTL	GF	GA	Points	Finish	Playoffs
1985-86	48	14	34	0	-	231	338	28	7th MJHL	Lost quarter-final
1986-87	48	14	33	1	-	272	320	29	8th MJHL	Lost quarter-final
1987-88	48	11	36	1	-	258	388	23	9th MJHL	DNQ

=== Playoffs ===
- 1986 Lost quarter-final

Winkler Flyers defeated Steinbach Hawks 4-games-to-none

- 1987 Lost quarter-final

St. Boniface Saints defeated Steinbach Hawks 4-games-to-none

- 1988 DNQ
