= Bruno Rogger =

Canadian-born Swiss ice hockey player

- Born: January 19, 1959 (age 66); Quesnel, British Columbia, Canada
- Height: 5 ft 10 in (178 cm)
- Weight: 168 lb (76 kg; 12 st 0 lb)
- Position: Defence
- Played for: HC Lugano
- National team: Switzerland
- Playing career: 1981–1992

Bruno Rogger (born January 19, 1959) is a retired Canadian-born Swiss professional ice hockey defenceman who played for HC Lugano in the National League A. He also represented the Swiss national team at the 1988 Winter Olympics.
