= Chuck Luksa =

Canadian ice hockey player

- Born: February 19, 1954 (age 71); Toronto, Ontario, Canada
- Height: 6 ft 1 in (185 cm)
- Weight: 190 lb (86 kg; 13 st 8 lb)
- Position: Defence
- Shot: Left
- Played for: Cincinnati Stingers; Hartford Whalers; Jokerit
- NHL draft: 172nd overall, 1974; Montreal Canadiens
- WHA draft: 177th overall, 1974; Phoenix Roadrunners
- Playing career: 1974–1982

Charles Luksa (born July 15, 1954) is a Canadian former ice hockey defenceman. He played 78 games in the World Hockey Association with the Cincinnati Stingers and 8 games in the National Hockey League with the Hartford Whalers between 1978 and 1980.

As a youth, Luksa played in the 1967 Quebec International Pee-Wee Hockey Tournament with a minor ice hockey team from Wexford, Toronto. Born in Toronto, Ontario, Luksa was drafted 172nd overall by the Montreal Canadiens in the 1974 NHL amateur draft and 177th by the Phoenix Roadrunners in the 1974 WHA Amateur Draft but never played for either team as Luska went on to spend four seasons in the American Hockey League for the Nova Scotia Voyageurs, winning the Calder Cup in successive years in 1977 and 1978. In 1978, the Roadrunners folded and Luksa signed with the Cincinnati Stingers as a free agent, playing 78 regular-season games for the team, scoring 8 goals and twelve assists for 20 points. The WHA folded at the end of the season and Luksa was signed by the Hartford Whalers. Luksa would only play eight games for the Whalers, scoring one assist, as he spent much of the season in the AHL with the Springfield Indians and would later spend another full season in the league with the Binghamton Whalers.

Luksa moved to Finland's SM-liiga in 1981 and signed with Jokerit before returning to the AHL the same season and signing with the Rochester Americans before retiring from the sport.

Luksa subsequently began selling real estate in Brampton, Ontario.

== Career statistics ==
=== Regular season and playoffs ===
			Regular season					Playoffs
Season	Team	League	GP	G	A	Pts	PIM	GP	G	A	Pts	PIM
1971–72	Ottawa M&W Rangers	CJHL	—	—	—	—	—	—	—	—	—	—
1971–72	Oshawa Generals	OHA	1	0	0	0	0	—	—	—	—	—
1972–73	Kenora Muskies	MJHL	47	7	37	44	119	—	—	—	—	—
1973–74	University of Toronto	CIAU	22	3	19	22	50	—	—	—	—	—
1973–74	Kitchener Rangers	OHA	10	2	7	9	—	—	—	—	—	—
1974–75	Nova Scotia Voyageurs	AHL	32	0	4	4	54	6	1	0	1	5
1975–76	Nova Scotia Voyageurs	AHL	73	5	13	18	75	9	0	2	2	6
1976–77	Nova Scotia Voyageurs	AHL	80	9	31	40	72	12	1	5	6	7
1977–78	Nova Scotia Voyageurs	AHL	66	3	23	26	89	11	1	4	5	25
1978–79	Cincinnati Stingers	WHA	78	8	12	20	116	3	0	0	0	7
1979–80	Hartford Whalers	NHL	8	0	1	1	4	—	—	—	—	—
1979–80	Springfield Indians	AHL	72	10	39	49	83	—	—	—	—	—
1980–81	Binghamton Whalers	AHL	63	3	18	21	104	6	0	2	2	12
1981–82	Jokerit	FIN	21	1	2	3	58	—	—	—	—	—
1981–82	Rochester Americans	AHL	33	2	8	10	33	6	0	2	2	4
WHA totals			78	8	12	20	116	3	0	0	0	7
NHL totals			8	0	1	1	4	—	—	—	—	—
