= Selkirk Steelers =

Junior ice hockey club

- City: Selkirk, Manitoba
- League: MJHL
- Division: East
- Founded: 1966
- Home arena: Selkirk Recreation Complex
- Colours: Red; Black
- General manager: Tim Schick
- Head coach: Hudson Friesen
- Website: Official website

Championships
- League: 1968; 1974; 1975; 1976; 1979; 1980; 1984; 1985; 1987; 2004; 2007
- Regional: 1974; 1975; 2007
- National: 1974

The Selkirk Steelers are a Junior "A" ice hockey team from Selkirk, Manitoba, Canada. They are members of the Manitoba Junior Hockey League, a part of the Canadian Junior Hockey League and Hockey Canada.

== History ==
Junior "A" hockey in Selkirk dates back to at least 1918, the founding of the MJHL. As one of the original members of the MJHL, the Selkirk Fishermen became the second Turnbull Cup, MJHL Champions by winning the 1920 playoffs. The Fishermen were crowned Western Junior "A" Champions and given the Abbott Cup. They moved on to the Memorial Cup for the national championship, but were defeated by the Toronto Canoe Club Paddlers. The 1920 Selkirk Fishermen were inducted into the Manitoba Hockey Hall of Fame in the team category.

In 1967, the Steelers joined the new Central Manitoba Junior Hockey League. The Steelers won the CMJHL title in its first year, but lost to the MJHL champion St. James Canadians in the Turnbull Cup finals. The CMJHL merged with the MJHL after only one year.

To date, the Steelers have won a total of ten MJHL Turnbull Cup Championships. Three of these championship teams went on to win the Anavet Cup. The 1973-74 season was the Steelers' most successful season. which saw them win the MJHL title and then defeat the Prince Albert Raiders 4-games-to-2 to win the Anavet Cup. They went on to compete for the Abbott Cup against the Kelowna Buckaroos of the British Columbia Junior Hockey League and defeated them 4-games-to-3. This advanced the Steelers to the national championship against the Smiths Falls Bears of the Central Junior A Hockey League for the Manitoba Centennial Cup, the National Junior "A" Championship. The series went seven games, with the Steelers stealing Game 7 1-0 in overtime to clinch their first and, so far, only national title. The 1974 Selkirk Steelers were inducted into the Manitoba Hockey Hall of Fame in the team category.

The Steelers last captured the MJHL championship in 2006-07. The Steelers defeated the Humboldt Broncos of the Saskatchewan Junior Hockey League four games to three for the Anavet Cup and advanced to the 2007 Royal Bank Cup, but were unable to advance past the round robin.

== List of championships ==
Championship	Years won
Turnbull Cup	1968, 1974, 1975, 1976, 1979, 1980, 1984, 1985, 1987, 2004, & 2007
Anavet Cup	1974, 1975, 2007
Abbott Cup	1974
Centennial Cup	1974

== Season-by-season record ==
Note: GP = Games Played, W = Wins, L = Losses, T = Ties, OTL = Overtime Losses, GF = Goals for, GA = Goals against

Season	GP	W	L	T	OTL	GF	GA	Points	Finish	Playoffs
1966-67	57	14	42	1	-	216	382	29	6th MJHL	
1967-68	23	19	3	1	-	159	77	39	1st CMJHL	Won League
1968-69	34	23	9	2	-	195	116	48	2nd MJHL	
1969-70	34	9	18	7	-	155	215	25	8th MJHL	
1970-71	48	8	34	6	-	142	241	22	8th MJHL	
1971-72	48	13	34	1	-	211	278	27	7th MJHL	
1972-73	48	20	26	2	-	202	253	42	7th MJHL	
1973-74	48	32	15	1	-	245	182	65	2nd MJHL	Won League, won AC, won AbC, won MCC
1974-75	48	35	12	1	-	283	175	71	1st MJHL	Won League, won AC
1975-76	52	29	23	0	-	318	277	58	4th MJHL	Won League
1976-77	51	22	27	2	-	249	263	48	6th MJHL	
1977-78	52	36	15	1	-	317	234	73	1st MJHL	
1978-79	46	29	16	1	-	254	194	59	2nd MJHL	Won League
1979-80	48	35	12	1	-	344	200	71	1st MJHL	Won League
1980-81	46	30	15	1	-	262	207	61	3rd MJHL	
1981-82	48	31	15	2	-	279	249	64	2nd MJHL	
1982-83	48	26	22	0	-	284	255	52	5th MJHL	
1983-84	48	35	12	1	-	340	230	71	2nd MJHL	Won League
1984-85	48	28	20	0	-	286	243	56	3rd MJHL	Won League
1985-86	49	33	15	1	-	308	217	67	3rd MJHL	
1986-87	47	35	12	0	-	300	176	70	1st MJHL	Won League
1987-88	48	26	20	2	-	260	234	54	5th MJHL	
1988-89	48	26	22	0	-	286	274	52	6th MJHL	
1989-90	52	28	24	0	-	295	271	56	5th MJHL	
1990-91	48	19	26	3	-	220	232	41	6th MJHL	
1991-92	48	22	24	0	2	200	228	46	5th MJHL	
1992-93	48	21	26	1	0	212	247	43	7th MJHL	
1993-94	56	16	34	5	1	--	--	38	8th MJHL	
1994-95	54	19	32	1	2	195	218	41	9th MJHL	
1995-96	56	24	27	3	2	280	279	53	7th MJHL	
1996-97	54	25	26	2	1	240	273	53	5th MJHL	
1997-98	62	26	35	0	1	226	271	53	7th MJHL	
1998-99	62	30	29	3	0	247	261	63	5th MJHL	
1999-00	64	32	25	-	7	314	305	71	6th MJHL	
2000-01	64	30	30	-	4	295	278	64	8th MJHL	
2001-02	64	23	36	-	5	216	269	51	9th MJHL	
2002-03	63	46	14	-	3	390	184	95	3rd MJHL	
2003-04	64	44	18	1	1	335	236	90	2nd MJHL	Won League, lost AC
2004-05	63	34	23	4	2	254	224	74	3rd MJHL	Lost final
2005-06	63	36	19	5	3	262	205	80	5th MJHL	Lost semi-final
2006-07	63	49	9	4	1	370	188	103	1st MJHL	Won League, won AC
2007-08	62	44	12	-	6	260	168	94	1st MJHL	
2008-09	62	45	17	-	0	315	186	90	3rd MJHL	
2009-10	62	36	25	-	1	253	221	73	5th MJHL	Lost quarter-final
2010-11	62	36	17	-	9	254	222	81	4th MJHL	Lost final
2011-12	62	37	23	-	2	246	214	76	5th MJHL	Lost quarter-final
2012-13	60	25	30	-	5	208	212	55	9th MJHL	DNQ
2013-14	60	49	7	-	4	243	122	102	1st MJHL	Lost quarter-final
2014-15	60	29	29	-	2	181	201	60	7th MJHL	Lost quarter-final
2015-16	60	23	31	-	6	196	255	52	8th MJHL	Lost quarter-final
2016-17	60	39	18	-	3	220	177	81	4th MJHL	Lost quarter-final
2017-18	60	31	25	-	4	192	206	66	7th MJHL	Lost quarter-final
2018-19	60	34	20	-	6	202	183	74	4th MJHL	Lost quarter-final
2019-20	60	23	30	-	7	178	219	53	9th MJHL	DNQ
2020-21	8	3	5	-	0	16	29	6	8th MJHL	cancelled
2021-22	54	24	24	-	8	185	200	54	7th MJHL	Lost quarter-final
2022-23	58	23	28	-	6	188	219	52	11th MJHL	DNQ
2023-24	58	25	23	5	5	161	174	60	5th of 7 East; 8th of 13 MJHL	DNQ
2024-25	58	29	23	3	3	206	192	64	5th of 7 East; 8th of 13 MJHL	DNQ

=== Playoffs ===
- 1971 Lost semi-final

Selkirk Steelers defeated Portage Terriers 4-games-to-2
Kenora Muskies defeated Selkirk Steelers 4-games-to-1

- 1972 Lost quarter-final

Dauphin Kings defeated Selkirk Steelers 4-games-to-none

- 1973 Lost quarter-final

Kenora Muskies defeated Selkirk Steelers 4-games-to-2

- 1974 Won League, won Anavet Cup, won Abbott Cup, won 1974 Centennial Cup

Selkirk Steelers defeated Portage Terriers 4-games-to-3
Selkirk Steelers defeated West Kildonan North Stars 4-games-to-1 MJHL CHAMPIONS
Selkirk Steelers defeated Prince Albert Raiders (SJHL) 4-games-to-2 ANAVET CUP CHAMPIONS
Selkirk Steelers defeated Kelowna Buckaroos (BCJHL) 4-games-to-3 ABBOTT CUP CHAMPIONS
Selkirk Steelers defeated Smiths Falls Bears (CJHL) 4-games-to-3 CENTENNIAL CUP CHAMPIONS

- 1975 Won League, won Anavet Cup, lost Abbott Cup

Selkirk Steelers defeated Portage Terriers 4-games-to-1
Selkirk Steelers defeated West Kildonan North Stars 4-games-to-3 MJHL CHAMPIONS
Selkirk Steelers defeated Swift Current Broncos (SJHL) 4-games-to-none ANAVET CUP CHAMPIONS
Spruce Grove Mets defeated Selkirk Steelers (AJHL) 4-games-to-2

- 1976 Won League, lost Anavet Cup

Selkirk Steelers defeated Dauphin Kings 4-games-to-1
Selkirk Steelers defeated Brandon Travellers 4-games-to-1
Selkirk Steelers defeated West Kildonan North Stars 4-games-to-none MJHL CHAMPIONS
Prince Albert Raiders (SJHL) defeated Selkirk Steelers 4-games-to-1

- 1977 Lost quarter-final

Brandon Travellers defeated Selkirk Steelers 4-games-to-3

- 1978 Lost semi-final

Selkirk Steelers defeated Portage Terriers 4-games-to-none
Dauphin Kings defeated Selkirk Steelers 4-games-to-3

- 1979 Won League, lost Anavet Cup

Selkirk Steelers defeated Brandon Travellers 4-games-to-2
Selkirk Steelers defeated Portage Terriers 4-games-to-none
Selkirk Steelers defeated Kildonan North Stars 4-games-to-2 MJHL CHAMPIONS
Prince Albert Raiders defeated Selkirk Steelers 3-games-to-1 and a default

- 1980 Won League, won Turnbull Cup, lost Anavet Cup

Selkirk Steelers defeated Kenora Thistles 4-games-to-none
Selkirk Steelers defeated Dauphin Kings 4-games-to-1
Selkirk Steelers defeated Kildonan North Stars 4-games-to-none MJHL CHAMPIONS
Selkirk Steelers defeated Thompson King Miners (NJHL) 3-games-to-none TURNBULL CUP CHAMPIONS
Prince Albert Raiders (SJHL) defeated Selkirk Steelers 4-games-to-2

- 1981 Lost final

Selkirk Steelers defeated Kildonan North Stars 4-games-to-none
Selkirk Steelers defeated Dauphin Kings 4-games-to-1
St. Boniface Saints defeated Selkirk Steelers 4-games-to-1

- 1982 Lost semi-final

Selkirk Steelers defeated Portage Terriers 4-games-to-none
Dauphin Kings defeated Selkirk Steelers 4-games-to-none

- 1983 Lost quarter-final

Winkler Flyers defeated Selkirk Steelers 4-games-to-3

- 1984 Won League, won Turnbull Cup, lost Anavet Cup

Selkirk Steelers defeated Winkler Flyers 4-games-to-1
Selkirk Steelers defeated Dauphin Kings 4-games-to-1
Selkirk Steelers defeated Kildonan North Stars 4-games-to-1 MJHL CHAMPIONS
Selkirk Steelers defeated Flin Flon Bombers (NJHL) 4-games-to-1 TURNBULL CUP CHAMPIONS
Weyburn Red Wings (SJHL) defeated Selkirk Steelers 4-games-to-2

- 1985 Won League, won Turnbull Cup, lost Anavet Cup

Selkirk Steelers defeated St. Boniface Saints 4-games-to-1
Selkirk Steelers defeated Winkler Flyers 4-games-to-1
Selkirk Steelers defeated Winnipeg South Blues 4-games-to-1 MJHL CHAMPIONS
Selkirk Steelers defeated Thompson King Miners (NJHL) 3-games-to-none TURNBULL CUP CHAMPIONS
Estevan Bruins (SJHL) defeated Selkirk Steelers 4-games-to-1

- 1986 Lost final

Selkirk Steelers defeated Dauphin Kings 4-games-to-1
Selkirk Steelers defeated Winkler Flyers 4-games-to-2
Winnipeg South Blues defeated Selkirk Steelers 4-games-to-none

- 1987 Won League, lost Anavet Cup

Selkirk Steelers defeated Winkler Flyers 4-games-to-2
Selkirk Steelers defeated Dauphin Kings 4-games-to-3
Selkirk Steelers defeated Winnipeg South Blues 4-games-to-3 MJHL CHAMPIONS
Humboldt Broncos (SJHL) defeated Selkirk Steelers 4-games-to-none

- 1988 Lost quarter-final

Portage Terriers defeated Selkirk Steelers 4-games-to-1

- 1989 Lost final

Selkirk Steelers defeated Portage Terriers 4-games-to-3
Selkirk Steelers defeated Dauphin Kings 4-games-to-1
Winnipeg South Blues defeated Selkirk Steelers 4-games-to-none

- 1990 Lost quarter-final

Dauphin Kings defeated Selkirk Steelers 4-games-to-1

- 1991 Lost quarter-final

Dauphin Kings defeated Selkirk Steelers

- 1992 Lost quarter-final

Winkler Flyers defeated Selkirk Steelers

- 1993 Lost quarter-final

St. Boniface Saints defeated Selkirk Steelers 4-games-to-none

- 1994 DNQ
- 1995 DNQ
- 1996 Lost quarter-final

St. James Canadians defeated Selkirk Steelers 4-games-to-3

- 1997 Lost semi-final

Selkirk Steelers defeated St. Boniface Saints 4-games-to-3
St. James Canadians defeated Selkirk Steelers 4-games-to-none

- 1998 Lost quarter-final

St. James Canadians defeated Selkirk Steelers 4-games-to-2

- 1999 Lost quarter-final

Winnipeg South Blues defeated Selkirk Steelers 4-games-to-1

- 2000 Lost quarter-final

Winnipeg South Blues defeated Selkirk Steelers 4-games-to-2

- 2001 Lost quarter-final

Winkler Flyers defeated Selkirk Steelers 4-games-to-1

- 2002 Lost quarter-final

Winkler Flyers defeated Selkirk Steelers 4-games-to-1

- 2003 Lost quarter-final

Winnipeg South Blues defeated Selkirk Steelers 4-games-to-2

- 2004 Won League, lost Anavet Cup

Selkirk Steelers defeated Winnipeg South Blues 4-games-to-3
Selkirk Steelers defeated Winnipeg Saints 4-games-to-2
Selkirk Steelers defeated Portage Terriers MJHL CHAMPIONS
Kindersley Klippers (SJHL) defeated Selkirk Steelers 4-games-to-3

- 2005 Lost final

Selkirk Steelers defeated Winnipeg Saints 4-games-to-1
Selkirk Steelers defeated Winnipeg South Blues 4-games-to-3
Portage Terriers defeated Selkirk Steelers 4-games-to-2

- 2006 Lost semi-final

Selkirk Steelers defeated Winnipeg Saints 4-games-to-2
Winnipeg South Blues defeated Selkirk Steelers 4-games-to-none

- 2007 Won League, won Anavet Cup, lost in 2007 Royal Bank Cup round robin

Selkirk Steelers defeated Winkler Flyers 4-games-to-1
Selkirk Steelers defeated Winnipeg Saints 4-games-to-none
Selkirk Steelers defeated Dauphin Kings 4-games-to-1 MJHL CHAMPIONS
Selkirk Steelers defeated Humboldt Broncos (SJHL) 4-games-to-3 ANAVET CUP CHAMPIONS
Fifth and eliminated from 2007 Royal Bank Cup round robin (0-4)

- 2008 Lost quarter-final

Winkler Flyers defeated Selkirk Steelers 4-games-to-1

- 2009 Lost final

Selkirk Steelers defeated Winkler Flyers 4-games-to-2
Selkirk Steelers defeated Winnipeg Saints 4-games-to-2
Portage Terriers defeated Selkirk Steelers 4-games-to-1

- 2010 Lost quarter-final

Winkler Flyers defeated Selkirk Steelers 4-games-to-2

- 2011 Lost final

Selkirk Steelers defeated Winnipeg Saints 4-games-to-1
Selkirk Steelers defeated Winkler Flyers 4-games-to-2
Portage Terriers defeated Selkirk Steelers 4-games-to-1

- 2012 Lost quarter-final

Portage Terriers defeated Selkirk Steelers 4-games-to-0

- 2013 DNQ
- 2014 Lost quarter-final

Winnipeg Blues defeated Selkirk Steelers 4-games-to-1

- 2015 Lost quarter-final

Selkirk Steelers defeated OCN Blizzard 2-games-to-0
Steinbach Pistons defeated Selkirk Steelers 4-games-to-0

- 2016 Lost quarter-final

Selkirk Steelers defeated Dauphin Kings 2-games-to-0
Portage Terriers defeated Selkirk Steelers 4-games-to-0

- 2017 Lost quarter-final

Portage Terriers defeated Selkirk Steelers 4-games-to-2

- 2018 Lost quarter-final

Virden Oil Capitals defeated Selkirk Steelers 4-games-to-1

- 2019 Lost quarter-final

Virden Oil Capitals defeated Selkirk Steelers 4-games-to-2

- 2020 DNQ
- 2021 Playoffs cancelled
- 2022 Lost quarter-final

Steinbach Pistons defeated Selkirk Steelers 4-games-to-1

- 2023 DNQ

== NHL alumni ==
- Murray Anderson
- Joe Cooper
- Gerry Hogue
- Dale Krentz
- Keith McCambridge
- Lyle Phair
- Johnny Sheppard
- Alex Shibicky
- Joe Thorsteinson
- Nick Wasnie
- Neil Wilkinson
- Darren Helm
- Andrew Murray
- Chuck Arnason
- Rob Martell (NHL Referee)

== See also ==
- List of ice hockey teams in Manitoba
- Manitoba Junior Hockey League
- Hockey Manitoba

Preceded by Portage Terriers	Centennial Cup Champions; 1974	Succeeded by Spruce Grove Mets
