= Winkler Flyers =

Junior ice hockey club

- City: Winkler, Manitoba
- League: MJHL
- Division: East
- Founded: 1980
- Home arena: Winkler Arena
- General manager: Matt Melo
- Head coach: Matt Melo
- Website: winklerflyers.com

Championships
- League: 1991; 1992; 1998; 2024
- Regional: 1992

The Winkler Flyers are a junior ice hockey club and franchise of the Manitoba Junior Hockey League (MJHL). The team plays its home games at the Centennial Arena in Winkler, Manitoba.

The club joined the league as an expansion franchise in the 1980–81 MJHL season. They won Turnbull Cup league championships in 1991, 1992, 1998 and 2024 and a regional ANAVET Cup championship in 1992.

== Season-by-season record ==
Statistics
Season	GP	W	L	T	OTL	GF	GA	Pts	Regular season	Post-season
1980-81	46	11	34	1	-	186	286	23	9th MJHL	
1981-82	48	23	25	0	-	240	231	46	6th MJHL	
1982-83	48	26	22	0	-	263	219	52	4th MJHL	
1983-84	48	31	16	1	-	301	262	63	4th MJHL	
1984-85	48	26	20	2	-	252	218	54	4th MJHL	
1985-86	48	37	10	1	-	369	194	73	1st MJHL	
1986-87	48	26	20	2	-	252	218	54	6th MJHL	
1987-88	48	20	26	2	-	259	254	42	7th MJHL	
1988-89	48	30	15	3	-	253	200	63	3rd MJHL	
1989-90	52	24	28	0	-	289	274	48	6th MJHL	
1990-91	48	37	10	1	-	321	216	75	2nd MJHL	Won League
1991-92	48	42	5	1	0	363	191	85	1st MJHL	Won League
1992-93	48	27	20	0	1	223	209	55	2nd MJHL	
1993-94	56	22	30	0	4	--	--	48	7th MJHL	
1994-95	55	30	22	1	2	254	216	63	3rd MJHL	
1995-96	56	28	24	3	1	238	212	60	6th MJHL	
1996-97	55	41	12	1	1	288	180	84	1st MJHL	
1997-98	62	44	15	2	1	286	197	91	1st MJHL	Won League
1998-99	62	41	18	2	1	275	199	85	3rd MJHL	
1999-00	64	37	22	-	5	253	233	79	4th MJHL	
2000-01	64	45	16	-	3	279	172	93	2nd MJHL	
2001-02	64	47	15	-	2	264	106	96	2nd MJHL	
2002-03	64	32	30	-	2	222	244	66	7th MJHL	
2003-04	64	32	21	-	11	263	238	75	5th MJHL	
2004-05	63	29	23	-	11	225	203	69	7th MJHL	
2005-06	63	33	23	-	7	231	208	73	6th MJHL	
2006-07	63	23	32	-	8	227	273	54	8th MJHL	
2007-08	62	33	23	-	6	235	224	72	6th MJHL	
2008-09	62	33	25	-	4	285	227	70	6th MJHL	
2009-10	62	29	27	-	8	216	216	66	7th MJHL	Lost semi-final
2010-11	62	38	17	-	7	231	196	83	2nd MJHL	Lost semi-final
2011-12	62	37	21	-	4	270	221	78	4th MJHL	Lost quarter-final
2012-13	60	22	27	-	11	200	227	78	8th MJHL	Lost quarter-final
2013-14	60	20	36	-	4	173	227	44	9th MJHL	Lost Survivor series
2014-15	60	31	17	-	12	204	185	74	4th MJHL	Lost quarter-finals
2015-16	60	42	13	-	5	260	153	89	3rd MJHL	Lost semi-final
2016-17	60	41	16	-	3	219	148	85	2nd MJHL	Lost semi-final
2017-18	60	35	25	-	0	205	175	70	5th MJHL	Lost semi-final
2018-19	60	23	32	-	5	152	221	51	9th MJHL	DNQ
2019-20	60	38	17	-	5	223	185	81	3rd MJHL	cancelled
2020-21	8	3	5	-	0	23	28	6	9th MJHL	cancelled
2021-22	54	33	16	-	5	201	153	71	3rd MJHL	Lost semi-final
2022-23	58	35	16	-	6	223	173	77	4th MJHL	Lost quarter-final
2023–24	58	42	11	2	3	234	122	89	2nd MJHL	Won League
2024–25	58	46	8	3	1	254	197	96	1st overall	Won quarterfinal against Niverville (4:2); Lost semifinal against Northern Manitoba (4:0)
2025–26	58	34	20	0	2	237	158	72	4th in division 5th overall	Lost quarterfinal against Niverville (4:0)

Source: "Winkler Flyers statistics and history". hockeydb.com.

=== Playoffs ===
- 1981 DNQ
- 1982 Lost quarter-final

Dauphin Kings defeated Winkler Flyers 4-games-to-2

- 1983 Lost semi-final

Winkler Flyers defeated Selkirk Steelers 4-games-to-3
Dauphin Kings defeated Winkler Flyers 4-games-to-2

- 1984 Lost quarter-final

Selkirk Steelers defeated Winkler Flyers 4-games-to-1

- 1985 Lost semi-final

Winkler Flyers defeated Dauphin Kings 4-games-to-3
Selkirk Steelers defeated Winkler Flyers 4-games-to-1

- 1986 Lost semi-final

Winkler Flyers defeated Steinbach Hawks 4-games-to-none
Selkirk Steelers defeated Winkler Flyers 4-games-to-2

- 1987 Lost quarter-final

Selkirk Steelers defeated Winkler Flyers 4-games-to-2

- 1988 Lost quarter-final

Dauphin Kings defeated Winkler Flyers 4-games-to-1

- 1989 Lost quarter-final

Dauphin Kings defeated Winkler Flyers 4-games-to-2

- 1990 Lost quarter-final

Portage Terriers defeated Winkler Flyers 4-games-to-1

- 1991 Won League, lost Anavet Cup

Winkler Flyers defeated Selkirk Steelers
Winkler Flyers defeated Dauphin Kings 4-games-to-1
Winkler Flyers defeated Winnipeg South Blues 4-games-to-none MJHL CHAMPIONS
Yorkton Terriers (SJHL) defeated Winkler Flyers 4-games-to-1

- 1992 Won League, won Anavet Cup, lost 1992 Centennial Cup final

Winkler Flyers defeated Selkirk Steelers
Winkler Flyers defeated Portage Terriers 4-games-to-1
Winkler Flyers defeated St. James Canadians 4-games-to-1 MJHL CHAMPIONS
Winkler Flyers defeated Melfort Mustangs (SJHL) 4-games-to-1 ANAVET CUP CHAMPIONS
Fourth in 1992 Centennial Cup round robin (2-2)
Winkler Flyers defeated Vernon Lakers (BCHL) 5-2 in semi-final
Thunder Bay Flyers (USHL) defeated Winkler Flyers 10-1 in final

- 1993 Lost quarter-final

Dauphin Kings defeated Winkler Flyers 4-games-to-3

- 1994 Lost final

Winkler Flyers defeated Portage Terriers 4-games-to-1
Winkler Flyers defeated Dauphin Kings 4-games-to-3
St. Boniface Saints defeated Winkler Flyers 4-games-to-2

- 1995 Lost final

Winkler Flyers defeated Dauphin Kings 4-games-to-3
Winkler Flyers defeated Neepawa Natives 4-games-to-3
Winnipeg South Blues defeated Winkler Flyers 4-games-to-2

- 1996 Lost quarter-final

Dauphin Kings defeated Winkler Flyers 4-games-to-1

- 1997 Lost semi-final

Winkler Flyers defeated Neepawa Natives 4-games-to-3
OCN Blizzard defeated Winkler Flyers 4-games-to-none

- 1998 Won League, lost Anavet Cup

Winkler Flyers defeated Neepawa Natives 4-games-to-1
Winkler Flyers defeated OCN Blizzard 4-games-to-1
Winkler Flyers defeated St. James Canadians 4-games-to-1 MJHL CHAMPIONS
Weyburn Red Wings (SJHL) defeated Winkler Flyers 4-games-to-3

- 1999 Lost semi-final

Winkler Flyers defeated Portage Terriers 4-games-to-2
OCN Blizzard defeated Winkler Flyers 4-games-to-1

- 2000 Lost semi-final

Winkler Flyers defeated St. James Canadians 4-games-to-3
Winnipeg South Blues defeated Winkler Flyers 4-games-to-1

- 2001 Lost final

Winkler Flyers defeated Selkirk Steelers 4-games-to-1
Winkler Flyers defeated Winnipeg South Blues 4-games-to-none
OCN Blizzard defeated Winkler Flyers 4-games-to-none

- 2002 Lost final

Winkler Flyers defeated Selkirk Steelers 4-games-to-1
Winkler Flyers defeated St. James Canadians 4-games-to-none
OCN Blizzard defeated Winkler Flyers 4-games-to-none

- 2003 Lost quarter-final

Southeast Blades defeated Winkler Flyers 4-games-to-3

- 2004 Lost quarter-final

Winnipeg Saints defeated Winkler Flyers 4-games-to-2

- 2005 Lost quarter-final

Winnipeg South Blues defeated Winkler Flyers 4-games-to-1

- 2006 Lost quarter-final

Winnipeg South Blues defeated Winkler Flyers 4-games-to-1

- 2007 Lost quarter-final

Selkirk Steelers defeated Winkler Flyers 4-games-to-1

- 2008 Lost semi-final

Winkler Flyers defeated Selkirk Steelers 4-games-to-1
Winnipeg Saints defeated Winkler Flyers 4-games-to-1

- 2009 Lost quarter-final

Selkirk Steelers defeated Winkler Flyers 4-games-to-2

- 2010 Lost semi-final

Winkler Flyers defeated Selkirk Steelers 4-games-to-2
Winnipeg Saints defeated Winkler Flyers 4-games-to-none

- 2011 Lost semi-final

Winkler Flyers defeated Waywayseecappo Wolverines 4-games-to-2
Selkirk Steelers defeated Winkler Flyers 4-games-to-2

- 2012 Lost quarter-final

Winnipeg Blues defeated Winkler Flyers 4-games-to-0

- 2013 Lost quarter-final

Winnipeg Blues defeated Winkler Flyers 4-games-to-2

- 2014 Lost Survivor series

Winnipeg Blues defeated Winkler Flyers 2-games-to-0

- 2015 Lost quarter-final

Virden Oil Capitals defeated Winkler Flyers 4-games-to-2

- 2016 Lost semi-final

Winkler Flyers defeated OCN Blizzard 4-games-to-1
Steinbach Pistons defeated Winkler Flyers 4-games-to-3

- 2017 Lost semi-final

Winkler Flyers defeated Virden Oil Capitals 4-games-2
OCN Blizzard defeated winkler Flyers 4-games-0

- 2018 Lost semi-final

Winkler Flyers defeated OCN Blizzard 4-games-to-2
Virden Oil Capitals defeated Winkler Flyers 4-games-to-0

- 2019 DNQ
- 2020 Playoffs cancelled

Virden Oil Capitals leading Winkler Flyers 2-games-to-1 when playoffs were cancelled due to COVID-19 pandemic

- 2021 Playoffs cancelled
- 2022 Lost semi-final

Winkler Flyers defeated Winnipeg Blues 4-games-to-2
Dauphin Kings defeated Winkler Flyers 4-games-to-1

- 2023 Lost quarter-final

Steinbach Pistons defeated Winkler Flyers 4-games-to-3

- 2024 Won Finals

Winkler Flyers defeated Steinbach Pistons 4-games-to-0

== List of Championships ==
Championship	Years won
Turnbull Cup	1991, 1992, 1998 & 2024
ANAVET Cup	1992

== National championships ==
The Centennial Cup is awarded to the national championship team from among the Maritime Junior Hockey League, Quebec Junior Hockey League, Central Canada Hockey League, Ontario Junior Hockey League, Northern Ontario Junior Hockey League, Superior International Junior Hockey League, Manitoba Junior Hockey League, Saskatchewan Junior Hockey League, and the Alberta Junior Hockey League league champions. The competition involves round-robin play in two 5-team pools with top three in each pool advancing to the finals. The BC and Yukon region has not been represented in the competition since 2021 when the BCHL declared itself an independent league.

Year	Round-robin	Record	Standing	Quarterfinal	Semifinal	Championship
2024	W, Sioux Lookout Bombers (NOJHL), 4-2; SOL, Melfort Mustangs (SJHL), 5-6; W, Oakville Blades (Host), 4-0; SOL, Miramichi Timberwolves (MarJHL), 2-3	2-0-0-2	3rd of 5 Group B	Lost 2-4; Calgary Canucks	did not qualified	did not qualified

== Notable alumni ==
Hockey Hall of Fame goaltender, Ed Belfour played in 81 games for the Flyers during the 1983–84, 1984–85 and 1985–86 seasons.

== See also ==
- Centennial Cup
- List of ice hockey teams in Manitoba
- Hockey Canada
