= Winnipeg Blues =

Manitoba ice hockey team

- City: Winnipeg, Manitoba
- League: Manitoba Junior Hockey League
- Division: MGEU-East
- Founded: 1930
- Home arena: The Rink Training Centre
- Colours: Black, Blue, Gold, White
- Owner: 50 Below Sports + Entertainment
- General manager: Josh Gratton
- Head coach: Josh Gratton
- Media: Winnipeg Sun; Winnipeg Free Press

Franchise history
- 1930–1976: Winnipeg Monarchs
- 1976–1977: Assiniboine Park Monarchs
- 1977–1978: Winnipeg Monarchs
- 1978–1984: Fort Garry Blues
- 1984–2010: Winnipeg South Blues
- 2010-present: Winnipeg Blues

The Winnipeg Blues are a Manitoba Junior Hockey League team based in Oak Bluff, a suburban area of Winnipeg, Manitoba, Canada. The team was founded in 1930 as the Winnipeg Monarchs and also formerly known as the Fort Garry Blues (1978-1984) and Winnipeg South Blues (1984-2010).

The Blues/Monarchs hockey club has won 17 Turnbull Cups as MJHL champions, two ANAVET Cups, and six Abbott Cups. The Monarchs were also three-time Memorial Cup champions before the reorganization of Canadian junior hockey in 1970. The 1995 Winnipeg South Blues have been inducted into the Manitoba Hockey Hall of Fame under the team category.

== History ==
=== Winnipeg Monarchs (1930–1978) ===
The Winnipeg Monarchs won the Memorial Cup as Canadian junior hockey champions three times: in 1935, 1937 and 1946. In 1946, George Robertson scored the winning goal in the seventh game of the 1946 Memorial Cup Final before a sell out crowd at Maple Leaf Gardens in Toronto, Ontario. The Monarchs were also finalists in 1932, losing to Sudbury Wolves in the final, and 1951, losing to the Barrie Flyers.

In addition to the three Memorial Cup titles, the Monarchs won ten Turnbull Cups as MJHL champions and five Abbott Cups as Western Canadian junior hockey champions.

=== Winnipeg Blues (1978–present) ===
The Monarchs were sold and relocated to the Century Arena in Fort Garry in 1978 and adopted a new name, the Fort Garry Blues. The team rebranded itself as the Winnipeg South Blues in 1984. The Blues captured six league championships while playing out of Fort Garry.

The Blues moved into the new MTS Iceplex in 2010 and shortened their name to the Winnipeg Blues. The team won its 17th Turnbull Cup in 2014 and made their only Western Canada Cup appearance that year.

In April 2019, the MJHL Board of Governors approved the sale of the team to 50 Below Sports + Entertainment Inc, owners of the Western Hockey League's Winnipeg Ice. The Blues relocated to The Rink Training Centre in the Rural Municipality of Macdonald for the 2019–20 season. The Blues returned to the Iceplex, now called the hockey for all centre, in 2023, before returning back to The Rink Training Centre beginning in the 2025-26 season.

The Blues were the sole Junior "A" club based in the Winnipeg area after the Winnipeg Saints relocated to Virden in 2012. They were joined by the Winnipeg Freeze, also owned by 50 Below Sports + Entertainment Inc, for the 2020–21 season.

== List of championships ==
Championship	Years won
Turnbull Cup	1982, 1986, 1988, 1989, 1995, 2006, 2014
ANAVET Cup	1986, 1995
Abbott Cup	1995
Memorial Cup	

== Season-by-season record ==
Note: GP = Games Played, W = Wins, L = Losses, T = Ties, OTL = Overtime Losses, GF = Goals for, GA = Goals against

Season	GP	W	L	T	OTL	GF	GA	Points	Finish	Playoffs
1978-79	44	10	32	2	-	175	281	22	9th MJHL	
1979-80	47	29	18	0	-	270	220	58	3rd MJHL	
1980-81	48	22	25	1	-	228	235	45	4th MJHL	
1981-82	48	38	9	1	-	310	167	77	1st MJHL	Won League
1982-83	48	31	16	1	-	255	199	63	3rd MJHL	
1983-84	48	33	15	0	-	242	176	66	3rd MJHL	
1984-85	48	37	10	1	-	292	174	75	1st MJHL	
1985-86	48	36	12	0	-	312	157	72	2nd MJHL	Won League, won AC
1986-87	48	27	20	1	-	318	232	55	4th MJHL	
1987-88	48	32	16	0	-	253	192	64	2nd MJHL	Won League
1988-89	48	34	8	6	-	286	178	74	1st MJHL	Won League
1989-90	52	36	16	0	-	348	202	72	2nd MJHL	
1990-91	48	30	17	1	-	246	212	61	3rd MJHL	
1991-92	48	17	29	0	2	219	246	36	7th MJHL	
1992-93	48	19	25	3	1	207	234	42	8th MJHL	
1993-94	55	33	21	1	0	--	--	67	3rd MJHL	
1994-95	55	24	26	3	2	207	230	53	5th MJHL	Won League, won AC, won AbC
1995-96	56	21	28	4	3	246	267	49	8th MJHL	
1996-97	55	19	31	2	3	234	275	43	8th MJHL	
1997-98	62	30	30	2	0	247	259	62	4th MJHL	
1998-99	62	27	33	2	0	223	289	56	6th MJHL	
1999-00	64	38	20	-	6	281	239	82	2nd MJHL	
2000-01	64	29	27	-	8	221	252	66	7th MJHL	
2001-02	64	31	28	-	5	237	246	67	7th MJHL	
2002-03	64	30	29	-	5	234	277	65	8th MJHL	
2003-04	64	25	31	-	8	252	248	58	8th MJHL	
2004-05	63	32	23	-	8	251	217	72	4th MJHL	
2005-06	63	39	20	-	4	245	198	82	3rd MJHL	Won League
2006-07	63	40	16	-	7	251	171	87	3rd MJHL	
2007-08	62	38	17	-	7	260	228	83	4th MJHL	
2008-09	62	20	42	-	0	195	313	40	10th MJHL	
2009-10	62	27	27	-	8	211	242	62	8th MJHL	Lost quarter-final
2010-11	62	18	32	-	12	215	292	48	10th MJHL	DNQ
2011-12	62	38	19	-	5	252	204	81	3rd MJHL	Lost semi-final
2012-13	60	45	14	-	1	269	165	91	2nd MJHL	Lost semi-final
2013-14	60	31	23	-	6	199	175	68	6th MJHL	Won League
2014-15	60	38	15	-	7	231	181	83	3rd MJHL	Lost semi-final
2015-16	60	32	18	-	10	212	174	74	5th MJHL	Lost semi-final
2016-17	60	27	27	-	6	193	202	60	6th MJHL	Lost quarter-final
2017-18	60	31	22	-	7	215	220	69	6th MJHL	Lost semi-final
2018-19	60	31	22	-	7	195	182	69	6th MJHL	Lost quarter-final
2019-20	60	24	29	-	7	197	126	55	8th MJHL	Lost quarter-final
2020-21	6	5	0	-	1	30	10	11	2nd MJHL	cancelled
2021-22	54	29	22	-	3	174	173	61	6th MJHL	Lost quarter-final
2022-23	58	17	33	-	8	170	262	42	12th MJHL	DNQ
2023-24	58	9	44	4	1	117	297	23	6TH OF 7 East; 12th OF 13 MJHL	DNQ
2024-25	58	9	43	4	2	108	250	24	6TH OF 7 East; 12th OF 13 MJHL	DNQ

=== Playoffs ===
- 1979 DNQ
- 1980 Lost quarter-final

St. James Canadians defeated Fort Garry Blues 4-games-to-2

- 1981 Lost quarter-final

St. James Canadians defeated Fort Garry Blues 4-games-to-1

- 1982 Won League, won Turnbull Cup, lost Anavet Cup

Fort Garry Blues defeated Kenora Thistles 4-games-to-none
Fort Garry Blues defeated St. Boniface Saints 4-games-to-none
Fort Garry Blues defeated Dauphin Kings 4-games-to-none MJHL CHAMPIONS
Fort Garry Blues defeated Flin Flon Bombers (NJHL) 3-games-to-none TURNBULL CUP CHAMPIONS
Prince Albert Raiders (SJHL) defeated Fort Garry Blues 4-games-to-2

- 1983 Lost semi-final

Fort Garry Blues defeated St. James Canadians 4-games-to-none
St. Boniface Saints defeated Fort Garry Blues 4-games-to-2

- 1984 Lost semi-final

Fort Garry Blues defeated St. James Canadians 4-games-to-1
Kildonan North Stars defeated Fort Garry Blues 4-games-to-2

- 1985 Lost final

Winnipeg South Blues defeated Kildonan North Stars 4-games-to-none
Winnipeg South Blues defeated St. James Canadians 4-games-to-1
Selkirk Steelers defeated Winnipeg South Blues 4-games-to-1

- 1986 Won League, won Anavet Cup, lost Abbott Cup

Winnipeg South Blues defeated Thunder Bay Hornets 4-games-to-none
Winnipeg South Blues defeated St. James Canadians 4-games-to-none
Winnipeg South Blues defeated Selkirk Steelers 4-games-to-none MJHL CHAMPIONS
Winnipeg South Blues defeated Humboldt Broncos (SJHL) 4-games-to-3 ANAVET CUP CHAMPIONS
Penticton Knights (BCJHL) defeated Winnipeg South Blues 4-games-to-1

- 1987 Lost final

Winnipeg South Blues defeated St. James Canadians 4-games-to-none
Winnipeg South Blues defeated St. Boniface Saints 4-games-to-none
Selkirk Steelers defeated Winnipeg South Blues 4-games-to-3

- 1988 Won League, lost Anavet Cup

Winnipeg South Blues defeated Kildonan North Stars 4-games-to-none
Winnipeg South Blues defeated St. James Canadians 4-games-to-2
Winnipeg South Blues defeated Portage Terriers 4-games-to-none MJHL CHAMPIONS
Notre Dame Hounds (SJHL) defeated Winnipeg South Blues 4-games-to-none

- 1989 Won League, lost Anavet Cup

Winnipeg South Blues defeated St. James Canadians 4-games-to-1
Winnipeg South Blues defeated Kildonan North Stars 4-games-to-none
Winnipeg South Blues defeated Selkirk Steelers 4-games-to-none MJHL CHAMPIONS
Humboldt Broncos (SJHL) defeated Winnipeg South Blues 4-games-to-1

- 1990 Lost quarter-final

St. James Canadians defeated Winnipeg South Blues 4-games-to-none

- 1991 Lost final

Winnipeg South Blues defeated Neepawa Natives 4-games-to-none
Winnipeg South Blues defeated St. James Canadians 4-games-to-1
Winkler Flyers defeated Winnipeg South Blues 4-games-to-none

- 1992 Lost semi-final

Winnipeg South Blues defeated St. Boniface Saints 4-games-to-2
St. James Canadians defeated Winnipeg South Blues 4-games-to-none

- 1993 Lost semi-final

Winnipeg South Blues defeated St. James Canadians 4-games-to-2
St. Boniface Saints defeated Winnipeg South Blues 4-games-to-1

- 1994 Lost quarter-final

St. James Canadians defeated Winnipeg South Blues 4-games-to-3

- 1995 Won League, won Anavet Cup, won Abbott Cup, lost 1995 Centennial Cup semi-final

Winnipeg South Blues defeated St. James Canadians 4-games-to-1
Winnipeg South Blues defeated Kildonan North Stars 4-games-to-none
Winnipeg South Blues defeated Selkirk Steelers 4-games-to-none MJHL CHAMPIONS
Winnipeg South Blues defeated Weyburn Red Wings (SJHL) 4-games-to-2 ANAVET CUP CHAMPIONS
Third in 1995 Centennial Cup round robin (2-2) ABBOTT CUP CHAMPIONS
Gloucester Rangers (CJHL) defeated Winnipeg South Blues 4-1 in semi-final

- 1996 Lost semi-final

Winnipeg South Blues defeated St. Boniface Saints 4-games-to-3
St. James Canadians defeated Winnipeg South Blues 4-games-to-none

- 1997 Lost quarter-final

St. James Canadians defeated Winnipeg South Blues 4-games-to-1

- 1998 Lost semi-final

Winnipeg South Blues defeated St. Boniface Saints 4-games-to-3
St. James Canadians defeated Winnipeg South Blues

- 1999 Lost final

Winnipeg South Blues defeated Selkirk Steelers 4-games-to-1
Winnipeg South Blues defeated St. Boniface Saints 4-games-to-3
OCN Blizzard defeated Winnipeg South Blues 4-games-to-none

- 2000 Lost final

Winnipeg South Blues defeated Selkirk Steelers 4-games-to-2
Winnipeg South Blues defeated Winkler Flyers 4-games-to-1
OCN Blizzard defeated Winnipeg South Blues 4-games-to-1

- 2001 Lost semi-final

Winnipeg South Blues defeated Winnipeg Saints 4-games-to-3
Winkler Flyers defeated Winnipeg South Blues 4-games-to-none

- 2002 Lost quarter-final

St. James Canadians defeated Winnipeg South Blues 4-games-to-3

- 2003 Lost semi-final

Winnipeg South Blues defeated Selkirk Steelers 4-games-to-2
Southeast Blades defeated Winnipeg South Blues 4-games-to-1

- 2004 Lost quarter-final

Selkirk Steelers defeated Winnipeg South Blues 4-games-to-3

- 2005 Lost semi-final

Winnipeg South Blues defeated Winkler Flyers 4-games-to-1
Selkirk Steelers defeated Winnipeg South Blues 4-games-to-3

- 2006 Won League, lost Anavet Cup

Winnipeg South Blues defeated Winkler Flyers 4-games-to-1
Winnipeg South Blues defeated Selkirk Steelers 4-games-to-none
Winnipeg South Blues defeated OCN Blizzard 4-games-to-1 MJHL CHAMPIONS
Yorkton Terriers (SJHL) defeated Winnipeg South Blues 4-games-to-1

- 2007 Lost quarter-final

Winnipeg Saints defeated Winnipeg South Blues 4-games-to-3

- 2008 Lost quarter-final

Winnipeg Saints defeated Winnipeg South Blues 4-games-to-1

- 2009 DNQ
- 2010 Lost quarter-final

Winnipeg Saints defeated Winnipeg South Blues 4-games-to-none

- 2011 DNQ
- 2012 Lost semi-final

Winnipeg Blues defeated Winkler Flyers 4-games-to-none
Portage Terriers defeated Winnipeg Blues 4-games-to-2

- 2013 Lost semi-final

Winnipeg Blues defeated Winkler Flyers 4-games-to-2
Steinbach Pistons defeated Winnipeg Blues 4-games-to-2

- 2014 Won League, Lost in 2014 Western Canada Cup round robin

Winnipeg Blues defeated Winkler Flyers 2-games-to-0
Winnipeg Blues defeated Selkirk Steelers 4-games-to-1
Winnipeg Blues defeated Steinbach Pistons 4-games-to-1
Winnipeg Blues defeated Dauphin Kings 4-games-to-1 MJHL Champions
Fifth and eliminated from Western Canada Cup round robin (1-3)

- 2015 Lost semi-final

Winnipeg Blues defeated Swan Valley Stampeders 4-games-to-0
Steinbach Pistons defeated Winnipeg Blues 4-games-to-1

- 2016 Lost semi-final

Winnipeg Blues defeated Virden Oil Capitals 4-games-to-3
Portage Terriers defeated Winnipeg Blues 4-games-to-0

- 2017 Lost quarter-final

OCN Blizzard defeated Winnipeg Blues 4-games-1

- 2018 Lost semi-final

Winnipeg Blues defeated Portage Terriers 4-games-to-2
Steinbach Pistons defeated Winnipeg Blues 4-games-to-2

- 2019 Lost quarter-final

Steinbach Pistons defeated Winnipeg Blues 4-games-to-2

- 2020 Lost quarter-final

Steinbach Pistons defeated Winnipeg Blues 4-games-to-0

- 2021 Playoffs cancelled
- 2022 Lost quarter-final

Winkler Flyers defeated Winnipeg Blues 4-games-to-2

- 2023 DNQ

== NHL alumni ==
- Tyler Arnason
- Lonny Bohonos
- Garnet Exelby
- Ryan Garbutt
- Sheldon Kennedy
- Grant Ledyard
- Duvie Westcott

== Retired numbers ==
- 3 - Grant Ledyard

== See also ==
- List of ice hockey teams in Manitoba
