= Brandon Travellers =

Manitoba former ice hockey team

- City: Brandon, Manitoba
- League: Manitoba Junior Hockey League
- Operated: 1973-1980
- Home arena: Keystone Centre

Franchise history
- 1973-1980: Brandon Travellers

The Brandon Travellers were a Canadian junior 'A' ice hockey team based in Brandon, Manitoba that played in the Manitoba Junior Hockey League from 1973 to 1980. The team was owned by the Western Hockey League's Brandon Wheat Kings.

Travellers' alumni to play in the National Hockey League included Dave Semenko, Ron Hextall, Glen Hanlon, and Laurie Boschman. Former NHL coach and scout Andy Murray started his coaching career with the Travellers.

== Season-by-season record ==
Note: GP = Games Played, W = Wins, L = Losses, T = Ties, OTL = Overtime Losses, GF = Goals for, GA = Goals against

Season	GP	W	L	T	OTL	GF	GA	Points	Finish	Playoffs
1973-74	48	31	16	1	-	225	174	63	3rd MJHL	Lost quarter-final
1974-75	48	13	35	0	-	208	314	26	9th MJHL	DNQ
1975-76	52	27	23	2	-	270	237	56	5th MJHL	Lost semi-final
1976-77	52	30	21	1	-	276	249	61	3rd MJHL	Lost semi-final
1977-78	52	34	17	1	-	297	231	69	2nd MJHL	Lost quarter-final
1978-79	48	17	30	1	-	254	202	35	8th MJHL	Lost quarter-final
1979-80	46	13	33	0	-	207	310	28	8th MJHL	Lost quarter-final

=== Playoffs ===
- 1974 Lost quarter-final

Portage Terriers defeated Brandon Travellers 4-games-to-none

- 1975 DNQ
- 1976 Lost semi-final

Brandon Travellers defeated Portage Terriers 4-games-to-2
Selkirk Steelers defeated Brandon Travellers 4-games-to-1

- 1977 Lost semi-final

Brandon Travellers defeated Selkirk Steelers 4-games-to-3
Dauphin Kings defeated Brandon Travellers 4-games-to-0

- 1978 Lost quarter-final

Dauphin Kings defeated Brandon Travellers 4-games-to-2

- 1979 Lost quarter-final

Selkirk Steelers defeated Brandon Travellers 4-games-to-2

- 1980 Lost quarter-final

Dauphin Kings defeated Brandon Travellers 4-games-to-2
