= Kenora Muskies =

Former Canadian ice hockey team

Kenora Thistles
- City: Kenora, Ontario
- League: Manitoba Junior Hockey League
- Home arena: Kenora Recreation Centre
- Colors: Maroon, White

Franchise history
- 1968-1975: Kenora Muskies
- 1975-1982: Kenora Thistles

The Kenora Muskies, known as the Kenora Thistles from 1975 to 1982, are a defunct Manitoba Junior Hockey League team that played in Kenora, Ontario between 1968 and 1982.

== History ==
The Kenora Muskies were granted expansion into the Memorial Cup-eligible Manitoba Junior Hockey League in 1968. Two season later, the league was relegated to Tier II Junior A and competed for the Manitoba Centennial Cup.

The Muskies best year in the league came in 1970-71 when they finished first place in the regular season but failed to win the Turnbull Cup as playoff champions.

In 1975, the Muskies were renamed to the traditional Kenora namesake, the Thistles. The original Kenora Thistles were 1906 Stanley Cup champions.

In 1982, the Thistles folded after three progressively worse losing seasons.

== Season-by-season record ==
Note: GP = Games Played, W = Wins, L = Losses, T = Ties, OTL = Overtime Losses, GF = Goals for, GA = Goals against

Season	GP	W	L	T	OTL	GF	GA	Points	Finish	Playoffs
1968-69	34	13	21	0	-	177	190	26	6th MJHL	
1969-70	34	20	13	1	-	192	148	41	2nd MJHL	
1970-71	48	29	16	3	-	228	179	61	1st MJHL	
1971-72	47	25	22	0	-	230	223	50	4th MJHL	
1972-73	48	21	26	1	-	288	296	43	6th MJHL	
1973-74	48	10	38	0	-	199	343	20	9th MJHL	
1974-75	48	15	33	0	-	243	331	30	8th MJHL	
1975-76	52	16	32	4	-	253	217	36	9th MJHL	
1976-77	52	28	24	0	-	258	244	56	4th MJHL	
1977-78	52	32	18	2	-	312	233	66	4th MJHL	
1978-79	45	24	20	1	-	299	274	49	5th MJHL	
1979-80	46	20	25	1	-	252	278	41	6th MJHL	
1980-81	47	13	31	3	-	238	327	29	7th MJHL	
1981-82	48	12	35	1	-	193	297	25	8th MJHL	

=== Playoffs ===
- 1969 Lost semi-final

Kenora Muskies defeated Selkirk Steelers 4-games-to-1
Dauphin Kings defeated Kenora Muskies 4-games-to-2

- 1970 Lost semi-final

Kenora Muskies defeated Portage Terriers 4-games-to-2
Dauphin Kings defeated Kenora Muskies 4-games-to-1

- 1971 Lost final

Kenora Muskies defeated Dauphin Kings 4-games-to-3
Kenora Muskies defeated Selkirk Steelers 4-games-to-1
St. Boniface Saints defeated Kenora Muskies 4-games-to-none

- 1972 Lost quarter-final

Portage Terriers defeated Kenora Muskies 4-games-to-1

- 1973 Lost semi-final

Kenora Muskies defeated Selkirk Steelers 4-games-to-2
Portage Terriers defeated Kenora Muskies 4-games-to-none

- 1974 DNQ
- 1975 DNQ
- 1976 DNQ
- 1977 Lost semi-final

Kenora Thistles defeated St. Boniface Saints 4-games-to-2
Kildonan North Stars defeated Kenora Thistles 4-games-to-3

- 1978 Lost semi-final

Kenora Thistles defeated St. James Canadians 4-games-to-1
Kildonan North Stars defeated Kenora Thistles 4-games-to-2

- 1979 Lost quarter-final

Kildonan North Stars defeated Kenora Thistles 4-games-to-3

- 1980 Lost quarter-final

Selkirk Steelers defeated Kenora Thistles 4-games-to-none

- 1981 Lost quarter-final

St. Boniface Saints defeated Kenora Thistles 4-games-to-none

- 1982 Lost quarter-final

Fort Garry Blues defeated Kenora Thistles 4-games-to-none

== Notable alumni ==
Muskies

- Mitch Babin
- Charlie Luksa
- Charlie Simmer
- Rick St. Croix

Thistles

- Mike Allison
- Ted Nolan

== See also ==
- List of ice hockey teams in Ontario
