= St. James Canadians =

Manitoba former ice hockey team

- City: Winnipeg, Manitoba
- League: Manitoba Junior Hockey League
- Operated: 1956-2004
- Home arena: St. James Civic Centre
- Colours: Red, Blue, White

Franchise history
- 1956–1966: Winnipeg Braves
- 1966-1967: St. James Braves
- 1967-2003: St. James Canadians
- 1978-present: St. James Canucks

Championships
- Playoff championships: 1959 Memorial Cup Champions

The St. James Canadians were a Canadian junior hockey team in the Manitoba Junior Hockey League until 2003, folding officially in 2004. The Canadians played out of the St. James Civic Centre, in Winnipeg, Manitoba. As the Winnipeg Braves, they won the 1959 Memorial Cup as National Junior Hockey champions.

== History ==
=== Winnipeg Braves ===
The Winnipeg Braves were founded in 1956 and affiliated with the Winnipeg Warriors (minor pro) of the Western Hockey League. The Braves played regular season games at Winnipeg's Olympic Rink and won two Turnbull Cup Championships as Manitoba Junior Champions (1959 and 1965).

The 1958-59, Braves won the Abbott Cup as Western Canadian Junior ‘A’ Champions, and were the last team from Winnipeg to win the Memorial Cup as National Champions. Under the leadership of manager Bill Addison and coach Bill Allum, the Braves defeated the Peterborough Petes coached by 25-year-old Scotty Bowman. In the championship series, the Petes won the first game 5-4, and the Braves came back to win four straight games 5-2, 5-2, 5-3 and 6-2. The final game of the series was played in Brandon, Manitoba due to the Shrine Circus appearing at Winnipeg Arena. The team included future NHL'ers Ted Green and Ernie Wakely.

Roster: Pat Angers, Don Atamanchuk, Al Baty, Gary Bergman, Ernie Bradawaski, Rene Brunel, Ted Green, Howie Hughes, Allan Ingimundson, Ken King, Ted Knight, Jerry Kruk, Laurie Langrell, Wayne Larkin, Al LeBlanc, Bob Leiter, Doug Monro, Zenon Moroz, Lew Mueller, John Rodger, Paul Sexsmith, John Sutherland, Bob Wales, Wayne Winstone, Ernie Wakely, J. D. (Jack) Perrin Jr. (President), Bill Addison (Manager), Bill Allum (Coach), Jim Drury (Trainer).

The Memorial Cup Championship team was inducted into the Manitoba Sports Hall of Fame and Museum in 2003, and inducted into the Manitoba Hockey Hall of Fame in the team category.

Prior to the 1966-67 season, the team moved to St. James and changed its name to the St. James Braves.

=== St. James Canadians ===
During the summer of 1967, a community-minded sports group purchased the St. James Braves from Ben Hatskin. The team relocated to the brand new St. James Civic Centre, where they played as the St. James Canadians.

The Canadians won the Turnbull Cup three times (1968, 1996, 1997) throughout their 35 years in the MJHL. They played until the end of the 2002-03 season. The team took a one-year leave of absence from the MJHL in 2003-04 before ceasing operations.

=== St. James Canucks ===
The St. James Junior Canucks joined the league in 1978-1979 to help complement the St. James Junior Canadians of the MJHL. The team moved to the Civic Centre and had a dressing room built on the home side of the rink and occupied that until the St. James Canadians folded and the Canucks, with the blessing of Diane Woods, president of the Canadians, took over the dressing room the Canucks call home today.

The Canucks have won the Art Moug Trophy (regular season winner) four times and the Jack McKenzie Trophy (playoff champion) four times.

== Season-by-season record ==
Note: GP = Games Played, W = Wins, L = Losses, T = Ties, OTL = Overtime Losses, GF = Goals for, GA = Goals against

Season	GP	W	L	T	OTL	GF	GA	Points	Finish	Playoffs
1957-58	30	13	16	1	-	146	135	27	3rd MJHL	
1958-59	31	22	7	2	-	177	111	46	1st MJHL	Won League, won AbC, won MC
1959-60	31	16	14	1	-	141	126	33	3rd MJHL	
1960-61	32	18	14	0	-	145	117	36	3rd MJHL	
1961-62	40	9	23	8	-	110	177	26	5th MJHL	
1962-63	39	14	22	3	-	127	156	31	4th MJHL	
1963-64	30	11	16	3	-	92	120	25	5th MJHL	
1964-65	44	26	13	5	-	184	140	57	1st MJHL	Won League
1965-66	48	20	24	4	-	207	219	44	3rd MJHL	
1966-67	56	21	34	1	-	254	361	43	5th MJHL	
1967-68	39	16	21	2	-	155	165	34	4th MJHL	Won League
1968-69	34	16	14	4	-	142	146	36	5th MJHL	
1969-70	34	16	12	6	-	146	136	38	4th MJHL	
1970-71	48	21	22	5	-	170	184	47	5th MJHL	
1971-72	48	31	16	1	-	256	191	63	3rd MJHL	
1972-73	48	27	20	1	-	225	187	55	2nd MJHL	
1973-74	48	19	27	2	-	216	223	38	6th MJHL	
1974-75	48	29	19	0	-	281	238	58	3rd MJHL	
1975-76	52	29	22	1	-	259	227	59	3rd MJHL	
1976-77	51	21	30	0	-	239	249	44	7th MJHL	
1977-78	52	25	27	0	-	265	258	50	7th MJHL	
1978-79	48	30	18	0	-	273	219	60	1st MJHL	
1979-80	47	28	18	1	-	236	191	57	4th MJHL	
1980-81	47	38	8	1	-	353	210	77	2nd MJHL	
1981-82	48	26	20	2	-	305	261	54	5th MJHL	
1982-83	48	12	34	2	-	221	301	26	7th MJHL	
1983-84	48	11	37	0	-	201	312	22	7th MJHL	
1984-85	48	29	18	1	-	266	224	59	2nd MJHL	
1985-86	48	29	18	1	-	276	221	59	4th MJHL	
1986-87	47	23	22	2	-	226	230	48	7th MJHL	
1987-88	48	21	25	2	-	223	215	44	6th MJHL	
1988-89	48	10	35	3	-	186	305	23	8th MJHL	
1989-90	52	24	28	0	-	253	275	48	7th MJHL	
1990-91	48	25	20	3	-	267	249	53	4th MJHL	
1991-92	48	30	16	1	1	242	207	62	3rd MJHL	
1992-93	48	25	20	2	1	241	233	53	4th MJHL	
1993-94	55	32	19	3	1	--	--	68	2nd MJHL	
1994-95	54	21	27	2	4	199	221	48	7th MJHL	
1995-96	56	34	21	1	0	266	194	69	4th MJHL	Won League
1996-97	55	31	22	0	2	226	183	64	4th MJHL	Won League
1997-98	62	29	30	2	1	254	247	61	5th MJHL	
1998-99	62	35	25	1	1	262	229	72	4th MJHL	
1999-00	64	38	23	-	3	285	243	79	3rd MJHL	
2000-01	64	26	31	-	7	224	240	59	10th MJHL	
2001-02	64	33	25	-	6	228	200	72	6th MJHL	
2002-03	63	6	56	-	1	166	405	13	11th MJHL	
2003-04	Did Not Participate									
St James Canucks
2004 - 2022 seasons not entered
2022-23	45	40	4	-	1	270	175	81	1st of 10	Won quarterfinal, 4-1 (Riels; Won semifinals, 4-1 (Railer Express); Won League Finals, 4-0 (Victorias); MMJHL CHAMPIONS
2023-24	45	37	7	-	1	220	110	75	1st of 10	Won quarterfinal, 4-0 (Railer Express); Won Div Semifinal, 4-0 (Hawks); Won League Finals 4-1 (Twisters); MMJHL CHAMPIONS
2024-25	45	23	19	2	1	184	175	49	6th of 10	Lost quarterfinal, 2-4 (Railer Express)
2025-26	45	23	19	2	1	184	175	49	6th of 10	Won quarterfinal, 4-2 (Hawks); Lost Div Semifinal, 1-4 (Riels)

=== Playoffs ===
- 1971 Lost semi-final

St. James Canadians defeated Winnipeg Monarchs 4-games-to-2
St. Boniface Saints defeated St. James Canadians 4-games-to-none

- 1972 Lost semi-final

St. James Canadians defeated Winnipeg Monarchs 4-games-to-2
West Kildonan North Stars defeated St. James Canadians 4-games-to-1

- 1973 Lost semi-final

St. James Canadians defeated West Kildonan North Stars 9-points-to-7
St. Boniface Saints defeated St. James Canadians 4-games-to-none

- 1974 Lost quarter-final

St. Boniface Saints defeated St. James Canadians 4-games-to-2

- 1975 Lost semi-final

St. James Canadians defeated St. Boniface Saints 4-games-to-none
West Kildonan North Stars defeated St. James Canadians 4-games-to-2

- 1976 Lost semi-final

St. James Canadians defeated St. Boniface Saints 4-games-to-1
West Kildonan North Stars defeated St. James Canadians 4-games-to-3

- 1977 Lost quarter-final

Kildonan North Stars defeated St. James Canadians 4-games-to-1

- 1978 Lost quarter-final

Kenora Thistles defeated St. James Canadians 4-games-to-1

- 1979 Lost quarter-final

St. Boniface Saints defeated St. James Canadians 4-games-to-1

- 1980 Lost semi-final

St. James Canadians defeated Fort Garry Blues 4-games-to-2
Kildonan North Stars defeated St. James Canadians 4-games-to-2

- 1981 Lost semi-final

St. James Canadians defeated Fort Garry Blues 4-games-to-1
St. Boniface Saints defeated St. James Canadians 4-games-to-1

- 1982 Lost quarter-final

St. Boniface Saints defeated St. James Canadians 4-games-to-2

- 1983 Lost quarter-final

Fort Garry Blues defeated St. James Canadians 4-games-to-none

- 1984 Lost quarter-final

Fort Garry Blues defeated St. James Canadians 4-games-to-1

- 1985 Lost semi-final

St. James Canadians defeated Thunder Bay Hornets 4-games-to-2
Winnipeg South Blues defeated St. James Canadians 4-games-to-1

- 1986 Lost semi-final

St. James Canadians defeated St. Boniface Saints 4-games-to-3
Winnipeg South Blues defeated St. James Canadians 4-games-to-none

- 1987 Lost quarter-final

Winnipeg South Blues defeated St. James Canadians 4-games-to-none

- 1988 Lost semi-final

St. James Canadians defeated St. Boniface Saints 4-games-to-1
Winnipeg South Blues defeated St. James Canadians 4-games-to-2

- 1989 Lost quarter-final

Winnipeg South Blues defeated St. James Canadians 4-games-to-1

- 1990 Lost semi-final

St. James Canadians defeated Winnipeg South Blues 4-games-to-none
Kildonan North Stars defeated St. James Canadians 4-games-to-3

- 1991 Lost semi-final

St. James Canadians defeated St. Boniface Saints 4-games-to-3
Winnipeg South Blues defeated St. James Canadians 4-games-to-1

- 1992 Lost final, Hosted and Eliminated in 1992 Centennial Cup round robin

St. James Canadians defeated Neepawa Natives 4-games-to-1
St. James Canadians defeated Winnipeg South Blues 4-games-to-none
Winkler Flyers defeated St. James Canadians 4-games-to-1
Fifth and eliminated in 1992 Centennial Cup round robin (1-3)

- 1993 Lost quarter-final

Winnipeg South Blues defeated St. James Canadians 4-games-to-2

- 1994 Lost semi-final

St. James Canadians defeated Southeast Blades 4-games-to-1
St. Boniface Saints defeated St. James Canadians 4-games-to-1

- 1995 Lost quarter-final

Winnipeg South Blues defeated St. James Canadians 4-games-to-2

- 1996 Won League, lost Anavet Cup

St. James Canadians defeated Selkirk Steelers 4-games-to-3
St. James Canadians defeated Winnipeg South Blues 4-games-to-none
St. James Canadians defeated Neepawa Natives 4-games-to-3 MJHL CHAMPIONS
Melfort Mustangs (SJHL) defeated St. James Canadians 4-games-to-none

- 1997 Won League, lost Anavet Cup

St. James Canadians defeated Winnipeg South Blues 4-games-to-1
St. James Canadians defeated Selkirk Steelers 4-games-to-none
St. James Canadians defeated OCN Blizzard 4-games-to-1 MJHL CHAMPIONS
Weyburn Red Wings (SJHL) defeated St. James Canadians 4-games-to-1

- 1998 Lost final

St. James Canadians defeated Selkirk Steelers 4-games-to-2
St. James Canadians defeated Winnipeg South Blues
Winkler Flyers defeated St. James Canadians 4-games-to-1

- 1999 Lost quarter-final

St. Boniface Saints defeated St. James Canadians 4-games-to-2

- 2000 Lost quarter-final

Winkler Flyers defeated St. James Canadians 4-games-to-3

- 2001 DNQ
- 2002 Lost semi-final

St. James Canadians defeated Winnipeg South Blues 4-games-to-3
Winkler Flyers defeated St. James Canadians 4-games-to-none

- 2003 DNQ

== Notable alumni ==
- Gary Bergman
- Kyle Brazeau
- Theo Fleury
- Ted Green
- Bill Heindl Jr.
- Howie Hughes
- Ted Irvine
- Barry Legge
- Bob Leiter
- Kurt MacDonald
- Dave McDonald
- Wayne Stephenson
- Ernie Wakely
- Murray Bannerman

== League championships ==
=== Jack Mackenzie Trophy (playoffs) ===
- 1997-98, 2021–22, 2022–23, 2023–24,

=== Art Moug Trophy (regular season) ===
- 1971-72, 1972–73, 1975–76, 1981–82, 1984–85, 1985–86, 2013–14
