= Jim Misener =

Canadian ice hockey player (born 1956)

Jim Misener (born July 1, 1956, in Roblin, Manitoba) is a Canadian former ice hockey winger who became the MJHL career leader in points, assists, and goals by the end of the 1976–77 MJHL season.

== Awards and achievements ==
- MJHL Scoring Champion (1975)
- MJHL Goal Scoring Leader (1975)
- MJHL First All-Star Team (1977)
- MJHL Most Valuable Player (1977)
