= Steinbach Pistons =

Manitoba ice hockey team

- City: Steinbach, Manitoba
- League: Manitoba Junior Hockey League
- Division: East
- Founded: 1988
- Home arena: Southeast Event Centre
- Colours: Navy blue, blue, white
- Owners: Steinbach Pistons, Inc.
- General manager: Paul Dyck
- Head coach: Paul Dyck
- Media: FloSports
- Website: steinbachpistons.ca

Franchise history
- 1988–1991: Southeast Thunderbirds
- 1991–1992: Southeast T-Birds
- 1992–2007: Southeast Blades
- 2007–2009: Beausejour Blades
- 2009–present: Steinbach Pistons

The Steinbach Pistons are a junior ice hockey franchise in the Manitoba Junior Hockey League (MJHL) based in Steinbach, Manitoba.

== History ==
=== Southeast Thunderbirds/T-Birds/Blades ===
The MJHL granted an expansion team to the Southeast Tribal Council, a group of First Nation bands in southeastern Manitoba, to begin play in the 1988–89 season. The team was known as the Southeast Thunderbirds and played out of the Notre Dame Arena in Winnipeg. The team was renamed the Southeast Blades in 1992. After taking a leave of absence for the 1996–97 season, the Blades moved northeast of Winnipeg to Sagkeeng First Nation. The Blades played ten seasons in Sagkeeng, the most successful being the 2002–03 season when they advanced to the Turnbull Cup finals which they lost to the OCN Blizzard.

Season	GP	W	L	T	OTL	GF	GA	Points	Finish	Playoffs
1988-89	48	1	47	0	-	177	449	2	9th MJHL	DNQ
1989-90	52	20	31	1	-	282	342	41	8th MJHL	Lost Round 1
1990-91	48	8	38	2	-	216	347	18	9th MJHL	DNQ
1991-92	48	2	46	0	0	106	453	4	9th MJHL	DNQ
1992-93	48	16	29	3	0	224	307	35	9th MJHL	DNQ
1993-94	56	10	34	1	1	--	--	22	9th MJHL	DNQ
1994-95	55	21	30	1	3	196	271	46	8th MJHL	Lost Round 1
1995-96	56	5	49	2	0	144	404	12	9th MJHL	Lost Round 1
1996-97	Did not participate									
1997-98	62	20	38	2	2	231	300	44	10th MJHL	DNQ
1998-99	61	21	38	2	0	234	265	44	8th MJHL	DNQ
1999-00	64	29	26	-	9	282	285	67	8th MJHL	DNQ
2000-01	64	7	55	-	2	160	405	16	12th MJHL	DNQ
2001-02	64	23	36	-	5	202	286	51	10th MJHL	DNQ
2002-03	63	40	18	-	5	265	210	85	5th MJHL	Lost final
2003-04	64	12	50	0	2	184	389	26	11th MJHL	DNQ
2004-05	63	7	50	2	4	165	331	20	11th MJHL	DNQ
2005-06	63	18	34	5	6	198	293	47	9th MJHL	DNQ
2006-07	63	9	46	5	3	181	356	26	11th MJHL	DNQ

"MJHL history and statistics". hockeydb.com.

=== Beausejour Blades ===
The Beausejour Blades were formed in 2007 following the sale and relocation of the team to the Sun Gro Centre in Beausejour. The move did not improve the team's fortunes; the Blades managed to win only 13 games over the two seasons of their existence.

Beausejour Blades
Season	GP	W	L	OTL	SOL	GF	GA	Pts	Season	Postseason
2007–08	62	7	50	1	4	165	400	19	5th in division 11th overall	Did not qualify
2008–09	62	6	52	2	2	147	424	16	5th in division 11th overall	Did not qualify

"MJHL history and statistics". hockeydb.com.

=== Steinbach Pistons ===
During the 2009 Allan Cup in Steinbach, Manitoba, the City of Steinbach, together with Blades management, announced that the team would be relocating to the T.G. Smith Centre in Steinbach for the 2009–10 MJHL season. The team was renamed the Steinbach Pistons, in recognition of the city's reputation as "The Automobile City". Steinbach was previously home to a MJHL team called the Hawks from 1985 to 1988.

Despite the team's improved record after the move to Steinbach, the Pistons failed to qualify for the playoffs in each of their first three seasons. The team's continued poor performance and strained financial position spurred a group of investors from the local business community to purchase the Pistons in 2012 and convert it to a community-owned organization. The next season, the Pistons ended the franchise's ten year playoff drought and captured their first Turnbull Cup.

The Pistons enjoyed their best seasons in 2017–18 and 2022–23, when the team won Turnbull Cups and advanced as far as the national championship. The team relocated to the Hylife Centre in nearby La Broquerie, Manitoba following the 2022–23 season to allow demolition of their home arena and construction of the Southeast Event Centre, which became their new home in March 2025.

Steinbach Pistons
Season	GP	W	L	OTL	SOL	GF	GA	Pts	Season	Postseason
2009–10	62	13	43	5	1	185	308	32	5th in division 11th overall	Did not qualify
2010–11	62	19	40	3	-	203	277	41	5th in division 11th overall	Did not qualify
2011–12	62	15	41	3	3	188	319	36	6th in division 10th overall	Did not qualify
2012–13	60	31	25	-	4	224	211	66	2nd in division 5th overall	Won quarterfinal against Portage (4:3); Won semifinal round against Winnipeg Blues (4:2); Won final against Dauphin (4:2)
2013–14	60	42	16	2	1	216	147	86	2nd in division 2nd overall	Won quarterfinal round against Portage (4:3); Lost semifinal against Winnipeg Blues (4:1)
2014–15	60	39	14	2	5	218	150	85	2nd overall	Won quarterfinal against Selkirk (4:0); Won semifinal against Winnipeg Blues (4:1); Lost final against Portage (4:0)
2015–16	60	45	10	-	5	251	138	95	2nd overall	Won quarterfinal against Swan Valley (4:0); Won semifinal against Winkler (4:3); Lost final against Portage (4:1)
2016–17	60	49	10	1	-	249	124	99	1st overall	Won quarterfinal against Neepawa Natives (4:2); Lost semifinal against Portage (4:2)
2017–18	60	48	8	2	2	296	130	100	1st overall	Won quarterfinal against Swan Valley (4:0); Won semifinal against Winnipeg Blues (4:2); Won final against Virden (4:2); Won ANAVET Cup against Nipawin Hawks (4:2)
2018–19	60	34	17	4	-	197	127	82	3rd overall	Won quarterfinal against Winnipeg Blues (4:2); Lost semifinal against Swan Valley (4:2)
2019–20	60	42	10	5	3	219	138	92	1st overall	Playoffs cancelled
2020–21	7	5	1	-	1	29	12	11	1st in division 3rd overall	Season cancelled
2021–22	54	42	9	2	1	239	122	87	1st in division 1st overall	Won quarterfinal against Selkirk (4:1); Won semifinal against Virden; Lost final against Dauphin (4:3)
2022–23	58	42	15	-	1	227	139	85	2nd in division 2nd overall	Won quarterfinal against Winkler (4:3); Won semifinal against Swan Valley (4:2); Won final against Virden (4:1)
2023–24	58	47	8	3	-	224	103	97	1st in division 1st overall	Won quarterfinal against Niverville (4:0); Won semifinal against OCN Blizzard (4:3); Lost final against Winkler (4:0)
2024–25	58	42	11	2	3	261	138	89	2nd in division 2nd overall	Lost quarterfinal against Portage (4:2)
2025–26	58	47	9	2	0	278	131	96	2nd in division 2nd overall	Won quarterfinal against Portage (4:1)

Source: "MJHL history and statistics". hockeydb.com.

=== Head coaches ===
The following is a list of the franchise's head coaches:

- Wayne Babych, 1988-90
- Rick Buffie, 1990-91
- Bob Cook, 1991-92
- Gord Malinoski, 1992
- Don MacGillivray, 1992-93
- David Roulston, 1993-95
- Dan Gregovski, 1995
- Dan Bourbonnais, 1996
- Bruce Schmidt, 1997-99
- Heavy Evason, 1999-2000
- Kelly Zacharias, 2000
- Steve Brown, 2000-01
- Jamie Leach, 2001-03
- Troy Kennedy, 2003-04
- Lyle Loewen, 2004-05
- Ray Neufeld, 2005-07
- Jamie Watts, 2007
- Kurt Walsten, 2007-09
- Rich Gosselin, 2009-11
- Paul Dyck, 2011-present

=== Gallery ===
Beausejour Blades logo 2007–2009

Steinbach Pistons logo 2012–present

== See also ==
- List of ice hockey teams in Manitoba
