= Kildonan North Stars =

Manitoba former ice hockey team

- City: Winnipeg, Manitoba
- League: Manitoba Junior Hockey League
- Operated: 1936-1990
- Home arena: West Kildonan Arena; Keewatin Arena

Franchise history
- 1936-1945: St. James Canadians
- 1945-1946: St. James Orioles
- 1946-1952: Winnipeg Canadiens
- 1952-1964: St. Boniface Canadiens
- 1964-1967: Winnipeg Warriors
- 1967-1976: West Kildonan North Stars
- 1976-1990: Kildonan North Stars

The Kildonan North Stars were a Canadian Junior ice hockey Team in the Manitoba Junior Hockey League from Winnipeg, Manitoba.

== History ==
During the summer of 1967, community-minded sports group purchased the Winnipeg Warriors from Ben Hatskin, renaming them the West Kildonan North Stars. The team was located in Northwest Winnipeg.

In 1967-68 Centre Wayne Chernecki led the MJHL in both points and goals, and was also voted Rookie of the Year, and earned First Team All-Star honors.

For the 1976–77 season the Team's name was shorted to the Kildonan North Stars.

In 1978, the Kildonan North Stars captured the Turnbull Cup as Manitoba Junior "A" Hockey Champions.

During the 1986–87 season, the North Stars became infamous for a completely winless 48-game season. During the stretch from the beginning of the 1985–86 season to the end of the 1986–87 season, the North Stars had 6 wins, 90 losses, and no ties. Over the two Seasons the Kildonan North Stars would set a record for the all time losing streak, 64 games without a point, passing the Regina Silver Foxes record of 58 losses from their 1975 season. Three years later the team was dissolved despite two consecutive winning seasons.

== Season-by-season record ==
Note: GP = Games Played, W = Wins, L = Losses, T = Ties, OTL = Overtime Losses, GF = Goals for, GA = Goals against

Season	GP	W	L	T	OTL	GF	GA	Points	Finish	Playoffs
1936-37	16	6	9	1	-	72	97	13	6th MJHL	
1937-38	16	4	9	3	-	70	119	11	7th MJHL	
1938-39	18	8	9	1	-	77	73	17	4th MJHL	
1939-40	18	8	10	0	-	--	--	16	6th MJHL	
1940-41	11	2	9	0	-	47	92	4	8th MJHL	
1941-42	18	9	9	0	-	106	107	18	4th MJHL	
1942-43	16	6	10	0	-	82	89	12	6th MJHL	
1943-44	10	4	6	0	-	36	48	10	4th MJHL	Won League
1944-45	9	3	6	0	-	56	69	6	4th MJHL	
1945-46	10	7	3	0	-	59	57	14	3rd MJHL	
1946-47	16	6	10	0	-	59	93	12	4th MJHL	
1947-48	24	15	7	2	-	137	99	32	1st MJHL	
1948-49	30	12	17	1	-	136	160	25	2nd MJHL	
1949-50	36	13	22	1	-	141	175	27	4th MJHL	
1950-51	36	8	28	0	-	129	206	16	4th MJHL	
1951-52	36	18	17	1	-	131	112	37	3rd MJHL	
1952-53	36	22	13	1	-	179	120	45	2nd MJHL	Won League, won AbC
1953-54	36	31	3	2	-	225	128	64	1st MJHL	Won League
1954-55	32	13	18	1	-	187	154	27	3rd MJHL	
1955-56	23	15	7	1	-	175	114	31	2nd MJHL	Won League
1956-57	30	26	4	0	-	260	100	52	1st MJHL	
1957-58	30	17	11	2	-	146	132	36	2nd MJHL	Won League
1958-59	31	21	8	2	-	143	96	44	2nd MJHL	
1959-60	31	21	9	1	-	140	93	43	2nd MJHL	
1960-61	32	10	21	1	-	141	191	21	4th MJHL	
1961-62	40	17	17	6	-	135	152	40	3rd MJHL	
1962-63	39	19	16	4	-	186	148	42	2nd MJHL	
1963-64	30	1	28	1	-	97	210	3	6th MJHL	
1964-65	44	13	27	4	-	152	222	30	4th MJHL	
1965-66	48	19	22	7	-	207	229	45	2nd MJHL	
1966-67	58	10	45	3	-	162	390	23	7th MJHL	
1967-68	35	17	18	0	-	151	189	34	3rd MJHL	
1968-69	34	12	21	1	-	130	171	25	7th MJHL	
1969-70	34	12	18	4	-	143	165	28	5th MJHL	
1970-71	48	21	19	8	-	210	211	50	4th MJHL	
1971-72	47	15	32	0	-	208	284	30	6th MJHL	
1972-73	48	25	23	0	-	213	228	50	3rd MJHL	
1973-74	48	33	14	1	-	274	168	67	1st MJHL	
1974-75	48	30	16	2	-	289	213	62	2nd MJHL	
1975-76	52	34	18	0	-	287	243	68	1st MJHL	
1976-77	52	36	16	0	-	277	204	72	2nd MJHL	
1977-78	52	27	25	0	-	246	273	54	6th MJHL	Won League
1978-79	47	27	18	2	-	255	214	56	3rd MJHL	
1979-80	49	24	22	3	-	242	239	51	5th MJHL	
1980-81	47	14	33	0	-	224	318	28	8th MJHL	
1981-82	48	9	36	3	-	208	209	21	9th MJHL	
1982-83	48	4	44	0	-	152	452	8	8th MJHL	
1983-84	48	18	30	0	-	244	306	36	5th MJHL	
1984-85	48	21	25	2	-	273	263	44	7th MJHL	
1985-86	48	6	42	0	-	194	455	12	10th MJHL	
1986-87	48	0	48	0	-	188	507	0	9th MJHL	
1987-88	48	11	36	1	-	204	317	23	8th MJHL	
1988-89	48	26	22	0	-	278	231	52	5th MJHL	
1989-90	52	36	16	0	-	332	246	72	3rd MJHL	

=== Playoffs ===
- 1971 Lost quarter-final

St. Boniface Saints defeated West Kildonan North Stars 4-games-to-3

- 1972 Lost final

West Kildonan North Stars defeated St. Boniface Saints 4-games-to-1
West Kildonan North Stars defeated St. James Canadians 4-games-to-1
Dauphin Kings defeated West Kildonan North Stars 4-games-to-none

- 1973 Lost quarter-final

St. Boniface Saints defeated West Kildonan North Stars 9-points-to-7

- 1974 Lost final

West Kildonan North Stars defeated St. Boniface Saints 4-games-to-none
Selkirk Steelers defeated West Kildonan North Stars 4-games-to-1

- 1975 Lost final

West Kildonan North Stars defeated St. James Canadians 4-games-to-2
Selkirk Steelers defeated West Kildonan North Stars 4-games-to-3

- 1976 Lost final

West Kildonan North Stars defeated Assiniboine Park Monarchs 4-games-to-1
West Kildonan North Stars defeated St. James Canadians 4-games-to-3
Selkirk Steelers defeated West Kildonan North Stars 4-games-to-none

- 1977 Lost final

Kildonan North Stars defeated St. James Canadians 4-games-to-1
Kildonan North Stars defeated Kenora Thistles 4-games-to-3
Dauphin Kings defeated Kildonan North Stars 2-games-to-1 (Series suspended, awarded to Dauphin)

- 1978 Won League, lost Anavet Cup

Kildonan North Stars defeated St. Boniface Saints 4-games-to-1
Kildonan North Stars defeated Kenora Thistles 4-games-to-2
Kildonan North Stars defeated Dauphin Kings 4-games-to-3 MJHL CHAMPIONS
Prince Albert Raiders (SJHL) defeated Kildonan North Stars 4-games-to-none

- 1979 Lost final

Kildonan North Stars defeated Kenora Thistles 4-games-to-3
Kildonan North Stars defeated St. Boniface Saints 4-games-to-none
Selkirk Steelers defeated Kildonan North Stars 4-games-to-2

- 1980 Lost final

Kildonan North Stars defeated St. Boniface Saints 4-games-to-2
Kildonan North Stars defeated St. James Canadians 4-games-to-2
Selkirk Steelers defeated Kildonan North Stars 4-games-to-none

- 1981 Lost quarter-final

Selkirk Steelers defeated Kildonan North Stars 4-games-to-none

- 1982 DNQ
- 1983 Lost quarter-final

St. Boniface Saints defeated Kildonan North Stars 4-games-to-none

- 1984 Lost final

Kildonan North Stars defeated St. Boniface Saints 4-games-to-none
Kildonan North Stars defeated Fort Garry Blues 4-games-to-2
Selkirk Steelers defeated Kildonan North Stars 4-games-to-1

- 1985 Lost quarter-final

Winnipeg South Blues defeated Kildonan North Stars 4-games-to-none

- 1986 DNQ
- 1987 DNQ
- 1988 Lost quarter-final

Winnipeg South Blues defeated Kildonan North Stars 4-games-to-none

- 1989 Lost semi-final

Kildonan North Stars defeated St. Boniface Saints 4-games-to-none
Winnipeg South Blues defeated Kildonan North Stars 4-games-to-none

- 1990 Lost final

Kildonan North Stars defeated Southeast Thunderbirds 4-games-to-none
Kildonan North Stars defeated St. James Canadians 4-games-to-3
Portage Terriers defeated Kildonan North Stars 4-games-to-none
