= ANAVET Cup =

Ice hockey trophy

- Portage Terriers hoist ANAVET Cup (2005)
- Sport: Ice hockey
- League: Canadian Junior Hockey League
- Awarded for: Western region champion
- Country: Canada

History
- First award: 1971
- Final award: 2019
- First winner: St. Boniface Saints
- Most wins: Humboldt Broncos (7); Prince Albert Raiders (7)
- Most recent: Portage Terriers (2019)

The ANAVET Cup was an ice hockey trophy awarded by the Canadian Junior Hockey League to the winners of a best-of-seven series between the championship teams of the SJHL and the MJHL. The winner also earned a berth in the Centennial Cup national championship tournament. The cup was first awarded in 1971, excluding the years from 2013 to 2017, when it was replaced by the Western Canada Cup, and 2020–2021, when the competition was cancelled as a result of the COVID-19 pandemic and then subsequently rendered inactive with the revised Centennial Cup format that took effect in 2022.

The term "ANAVET" comes from the Canadian non-for-profit organization ANAVETS, or Army, Navy and Air Force Veterans in Canada.

The Western region's ANAVET Cup Champion traditionally played against the Pacific region's Doyle Cup champion for the Abbott Cup, the Western Canadian Championship. However, the Abbott Cup diminished in importance following the reorganization of the national championship in 1990. The Abbott Cup was then presented to the winner of the round-robin game, between the Pacific champion and Western champion, during the larger national competition; this practice ended, and the Abbott Cup was retired, after the 1999 season.

== Champions ==
- Champions in **bold**

**Western Junior "A" Champions**
Year	MJHL Champion	SJHL Champion	Series
1971	**St. Boniface Saints**	Weyburn Red Wings	4–2
1972	Dauphin Kings	**Humboldt Broncos**	2–4
1973	**Portage Terriers**	Humboldt Broncos	3–2 (D)
1974	**Selkirk Steelers**	Prince Albert Raiders	4–2
1975	**Selkirk Steelers**	Swift Current Broncos	4–0
1976	Selkirk Steelers	**Prince Albert Raiders**	1–4
1977	Dauphin Kings	**Prince Albert Raiders**	1–4
1978	Kildonan North Stars	**Prince Albert Raiders**	0–4
1979	Selkirk Steelers	**Prince Albert Raiders**	1–4
1980	Selkirk Steelers	**Prince Albert Raiders**	2–4
1981	St. Boniface Saints	**Prince Albert Raiders**	1–4
1982	Winnipeg South Blues	**Prince Albert Raiders**	2–4
1983	**Dauphin Kings**	Yorkton Terriers	4–1
1984	Selkirk Steelers	**Weyburn Red Wings**	2–4
1985	Selkirk Steelers	**Estevan Bruins**	1–4
1986	**Winnipeg South Blues**	Humboldt Broncos	4–3
1987	Selkirk Steelers	**Humboldt Broncos**	0–4
1988	Winnipeg South Blues	**Notre Dame Hounds**	0–4
1989	Winnipeg South Blues	**Humboldt Broncos**	1–4
1990	Portage Terriers	**Nipawin Hawks**	2–4
1991	Winkler Flyers	**Yorkton Terriers**	1–4
1992	**Winkler Flyers**	Melfort Mustangs	4–1
1993	Dauphin Kings	**Flin Flon Bombers**	2–4
1994	St. Boniface Saints	**Weyburn Red Wings**	3–4
1995	**Winnipeg South Blues**	Weyburn Red Wings	4–2
1996	St. James Canadians	**Melfort Mustangs**	0–4
1997	St. James Canadians	**Weyburn Red Wings**	1–4
1998	Winkler Flyers	**Weyburn Red Wings**	3–4
1999	OCN Blizzard	**Estevan Bruins**	2–4
2000	OCN Blizzard	**North Battleford North Stars**	1–4
2001	OCN Blizzard	**Weyburn Red Wings**	2–4
2002	**OCN Blizzard**	Kindersley Klippers	4–1
2003	OCN Blizzard	**Humboldt Broncos**	1–4
2004	Selkirk Steelers	**Kindersley Klippers**	3–4
2005	**Portage Terriers**	Yorkton Terriers	4–2
2006	Winnipeg South Blues	**Yorkton Terriers**	1–4
2007	**Selkirk Steelers**	Humboldt Broncos	4–3
2008	Portage Terriers	**Humboldt Broncos**	0–4
2009	Portage Terriers	**Humboldt Broncos**	3–4
2010	**Dauphin Kings**	La Ronge Ice Wolves	4–1
2011	**Portage Terriers**	La Ronge Ice Wolves	4–3
2012	Portage Terriers	**Humboldt Broncos**	3–4
2013-2017: replaced by Western Canada Cup
2018	**Steinbach Pistons**	Nipawin Hawks	4–2
2019	**Portage Terriers**	Battlefords North Stars	4–1
2020-2022: not awarded

== Results by team ==
- results as of 2019 ANAVET Cup

Team	League	Champions	Runners-up	Total
Humboldt Broncos	SJHL	7	3	10
Prince Albert Raiders*	SJHL	7	1	8
Weyburn Red Wings	SJHL	5	2	7
Portage Terriers	MJHL	4	4	8
Selkirk Steelers	MJHL	3	7	10
Winnipeg Blues	MJHL	2	4	6
Dauphin Kings	MJHL	2	3	5
Yorkton Terriers	SJHL	2	2	4
Estevan Bruins	SJHL	2		2
OCN Blizzard	MJHL	1	4	5
St. Boniface Saints	MJHL	1	2	3
Winkler Flyers	MJHL	1	2	3
Kindersley Klippers	SJHL	1	1	2
Melfort Mustangs	SJHL	1	1	2
Nipawin Hawks	SJHL	1	1	2
North Battleford North Stars	SJHL	1	1	2
Flin Flon Bombers	SJHL	1		1
Notre Dame Hounds	SJHL	1		1
Steinbach Pistons	MJHL	1		1
La Ronge Ice Wolves	SJHL		2	2
St. James Canadians*	MJHL		2	2
Swift Current Broncos*	SJHL		1	1
Kildonan North Stars*	MJHL		1	1

* denotes team is defunct or no longer part of the league

== Results by league ==
- results as of 2019 ANAVET Cup

League	Champions	Runners-up	Total
Saskatchewan Junior Hockey League	29	15	44
Manitoba Junior Hockey League	15	29	
