= Winnipeg Saints =

Manitoba former ice hockey team

- City: Winnipeg, Manitoba
- League: Manitoba Junior Hockey League
- Operated: 1967-2012
- Colours: Black, Red, White

Franchise history
- 1956-1957: Winnipeg Rangers
- 1957-1958: Brandon Rangers
- 1958-1959: Transcona Rangers
- 1959-1967: Winnipeg Rangers
- 1967-2000: St.Boniface Saints
- 2000-2012: Winnipeg Saints
- 2012-Present: Virden Oil Capitals

The Winnipeg Saints were a Manitoba Junior Hockey League team based in Winnipeg, Manitoba. The team was known for most of its existence as the St. Boniface Saints and exists today as the Virden Oil Capitals.

== History ==
The St. Boniface Saints were formed in 1967 when the Winnipeg Rangers were purchased by a local group and relocated to St. Boniface. The Saints won three Turnbull Cups as Manitoba Junior 'A' champions (1971, 1981, and 1994), and the Anavet Cup in 1971.

The team became the Winnipeg Saints in 2000 after moving to the Dakota Community Centre in St. Vital, which would be their home until the end of the 2009–2010 season. They played one season out of St. Adolphe arena and then returned to Winnipeg, playing out of the St. James Civic Centre for the 2011–2012 season. In the spring of 2012, the Saints franchise was purchased by a group from Virden and subsequently relocated to the southwestern Manitoba town for the start of the 2012–13 season.

Notable Saints alumni include Mike Ridley, Colton Orr, Russ Romaniuk, and Travis Hamonic.

== List of championships ==
| Championship | Years won |
|---|---|
| Turnbull Cup | 1966, 1971, 1981, & 1994 |
| Anavet Cup | 1971 |

== Season-by-season record ==
Note: GP = Games Played, W = Wins, L = Losses, T = Ties, OTL = Overtime Losses, GF = Goals for, GA = Goals against

| Season | GP | W | L | T | OTL | GF | GA | Points | Finish | Playoffs |
| 1956-57 | 29 | 7 | 21 | 1 | - | 95 | 203 | 15 | 3rd MJHL | |
| 1957-58 | 30 | 10 | 20 | 0 | - | 128 | 193 | 20 | 4th MJHL | |
| 1958-59 | 32 | 10 | 19 | 3 | - | 110 | 166 | 23 | 4th MJHL | |
| 1959-60 | 32 | 10 | 21 | 1 | - | 100 | 144 | 21 | 4th MJHL | |
| 1960-61 | 32 | 21 | 11 | 0 | - | 157 | 120 | 42 | 2nd MJHL | Won League |
| 1961-62 | 40 | 16 | 20 | 4 | - | 128 | 150 | 36 | 4th MJHL | |
| 1962-63 | 40 | 11 | 25 | 4 | - | 141 | 196 | 26 | 5th MJHL | |
| 1963-64 | 30 | 15 | 12 | 3 | - | 120 | 91 | 33 | 3rd MJHL | |
| 1964-65 | 45 | 21 | 18 | 6 | - | 202 | 170 | 48 | 2nd MJHL | |
| 1965-66 | 48 | 27 | 16 | 5 | - | 219 | 186 | 59 | 1st MJHL | Won League |
| 1966-67 | 57 | 34 | 19 | 4 | - | 263 | 201 | 74 | 3rd MJHL | |
| 1967-68 | 36 | 18 | 17 | 1 | - | 157 | 152 | 37 | 2nd MJHL | |
| 1968-69 | 34 | 18 | 14 | 2 | - | 145 | 126 | 38 | 4th MJHL | |
| 1969-70 | 34 | 11 | 19 | 4 | - | 152 | 176 | 26 | 7th MJHL | |
| 1970-71 | 48 | 19 | 22 | 7 | - | 208 | 195 | 45 | 6th MJHL | Won League, won AC |
| 1971-72 | 48 | 22 | 24 | 2 | - | 200 | 214 | 46 | 5th MJHL | |
| 1972-73 | 48 | 24 | 24 | 0 | - | 221 | 225 | 48 | 4th MJHL | |
| 1973-74 | 47 | 28 | 18 | 1 | - | 228 | 188 | 57 | 5th MJHL | |
| 1974-75 | 48 | 23 | 25 | 0 | - | 234 | 251 | 46 | 6th MJHL | |
| 1975-76 | 52 | 30 | 18 | 4 | - | 244 | 209 | 64 | 2nd MJHL | |
| 1976-77 | 52 | 23 | 27 | 2 | - | 225 | 262 | 48 | 5th MJHL | |
| 1977-78 | 52 | 31 | 21 | 0 | - | 289 | 260 | 62 | 5th MJHL | |
| 1978-79 | 48 | 21 | 26 | 1 | - | 227 | 225 | 43 | 7th MJHL | |
| 1979-80 | 48 | 32 | 15 | 1 | - | 294 | 214 | 65 | 2nd MJHL | |
| 1980-81 | 48 | 41 | 6 | 1 | - | 342 | 164 | 83 | 1st MJHL | Won League |
| 1981-82 | 48 | 30 | 18 | 0 | - | 284 | 232 | 60 | 3rd MJHL | |
| 1982-83 | 48 | 33 | 14 | 1 | - | 369 | 242 | 67 | 2nd MJHL | |
| 1983-84 | 48 | 17 | 31 | 0 | - | 238 | 266 | 34 | 6th MJHL | |
| 1984-85 | 48 | 17 | 29 | 2 | - | 215 | 278 | 36 | 8th MJHL | |
| 1985-86 | 48 | 29 | 19 | 0 | - | 317 | 265 | 58 | 5th MJHL | |
| 1986-87 | 48 | 31 | 17 | 0 | - | 306 | 273 | 62 | 2nd MJHL | |
| 1987-88 | 48 | 32 | 16 | 0 | - | 275 | 215 | 64 | 3rd MJHL | |
| 1988-89 | 48 | 29 | 10 | 9 | - | 290 | 209 | 67 | 2nd MJHL | |
| 1989-90 | 52 | 3 | 48 | 1 | - | 175 | 427 | 7 | 10th MJHL | |
| 1990-91 | 48 | 15 | 32 | 1 | - | 212 | 267 | 31 | 7th MJHL | |
| 1991-92 | 48 | 21 | 26 | 0 | 1 | 202 | 228 | 43 | 6th MJHL | |
| 1992-93 | 48 | 26 | 19 | 2 | 1 | 197 | 189 | 55 | 3rd MJHL | |
| 1993-94 | 56 | 38 | 16 | 1 | 1 | -- | -- | 78 | 1st MJHL | Won League |
| 1994-95 | 56 | 43 | 10 | 2 | 1 | 283 | 160 | 90 | 1st MJHL | |
| 1995-96 | 56 | 33 | 18 | 2 | 3 | 244 | 215 | 71 | 2nd MJHL | |
| 1996-97 | 55 | 24 | 29 | 1 | 1 | 245 | 272 | 50 | 6th MJHL | |
| 1997-98 | 62 | 22 | 37 | 2 | 1 | 214 | 262 | 47 | 9th MJHL | |
| 1998-99 | 62 | 26 | 33 | 2 | 1 | 239 | 319 | 55 | 7th MJHL | |
| 1999-00 | 64 | 21 | 40 | - | 3 | 230 | 372 | 45 | 11th MJHL | |
| 2000-01 | 64 | 33 | 28 | - | 3 | 281 | 263 | 69 | 6th MJHL | |
| 2001-02 | 64 | 20 | 40 | - | 4 | 178 | 293 | 44 | 11th MJHL | |
| 2002-03 | 64 | 23 | 34 | - | 7 | 225 | 278 | 53 | 10th MJHL | |
| 2003-04 | 64 | 33 | 29 | - | 2 | 267 | 238 | 68 | 7th MJHL | |
| 2004-05 | 63 | 28 | 24 | - | 11 | 214 | 209 | 67 | 8th MJHL | |
| 2005-06 | 63 | 37 | 20 | - | 6 | 279 | 206 | 80 | 4th MJHL | |
| 2006-07 | 63 | 31 | 31 | - | 1 | 259 | 281 | 63 | 6th MJHL | |
| 2007-08 | 62 | 45 | 14 | - | 3 | 345 | 191 | 93 | 2nd MJHL | Lost final |
| 2008-09 | 62 | 48 | 11 | - | 3 | 381 | 192 | 99 | 1st MJHL | Lost Addison 1st Rd |
| 2009-10 | 62 | 36 | 19 | - | 7 | 228 | 199 | 79 | 3rd MJHL | Lost final |
| 2010-11 | 62 | 31 | 30 | - | 1 | 225 | 229 | 63 | 8th MJHL | Lost quarter-final |
| 2011-12 | 62 | 34 | 22 | - | 6 | 230 | 215 | 74 | 6th MJHL | Lost final |

=== Playoffs ===
- 1971 Won League, won Man/Sask Championship, lost Abbott Cup

St. Boniface Saints defeated West Kildonan North Stars 4-games-to-3
St. Boniface Saints defeated St. James Canadians 4-games-to-none
St. Boniface Saints defeated Kenora Muskies 4-games-to-none MJHL CHAMPIONS
St. Boniface Saints defeated Weyburn Red Wings (SJHL) 4-games-to-2 MAN/SASK CHAMPIONS
Red Deer Rustlers (AJHL) defeated St. Boniface Saints 4-games-to-none

- 1972 Lost quarter-final

West Kildonan North Stars defeated St. Boniface Saints 4-games-to-1

- 1973 Lost semi-final

St. Boniface Saints defeated West Kildonan North Stars 9-points-to-7
St. James Canadians defeated St. Boniface Saints 4-games-to-none

- 1974 Lost semi-final

St. Boniface Saints defeated St. James Canadians 4-games-to-2
West Kildonan North Stars defeated St. Boniface Saints 4-games-to-none

- 1975 Lost quarter-final

St. James Canadians defeated St. Boniface Saints 4-games-to-none

- 1976 Lost quarter-final

St. James Canadians defeated St. Boniface Saints 4-games-to-1

- 1977 Lost quarter-final

Kenora Thistles defeated St. Boniface Saints 4-games-to-2

- 1978 Lost quarter-final

Kildonan North Stars defeated St. Boniface Saints 4-games-to-1

- 1979 Lost semi-final

St. Boniface Saints defeated St. James Canadians 4-games-to-1
Kildonan North Stars defeated St. Boniface Saints 4-games-to-none

- 1980 Lost quarter-final

Kildonan North Stars defeated St. Boniface Saints 4-games-to-2

- 1981 Won League, won Turnbull Cup, lost Anavet Cup

St. Boniface Saints defeated Kenora Thistles 4-games-to-none
St. Boniface Saints defeated St. James Canadians 4-games-to-1
St. Boniface Saints defeated Selkirk Steelers 4-games-to-1 MJHL CHAMPIONS
St. Boniface Saints defeated Thompson King Miners (NJHL) 3-games-to-none TURNBULL CUP CHAMPIONS
Prince Albert Raiders (SJHL) defeated St. Boniface Saints 4-games-to-1

- 1982 Lost semi-final

St. Boniface Saints defeated St. James Canadians 4-games-to-2
Fort Garry Blues defeated St. Boniface Saints 4-games-to-none

- 1983 Lost final

St. Boniface Saints defeated Kildonan North Stars 4-games-to-none
St. Boniface Saints defeated Fort Garry Blues 4-games-to-2
Dauphin Kings defeated St. Boniface Saints 4-games-to-1

- 1984 Lost quarter-final

Kildonan North Stars defeated St. Boniface Saints 4-games-to-none

- 1985 Lost quarter-final

Selkirk Steelers defeated St. Boniface Saints 4-games-to-1

- 1986 Lost quarter-final

St. James Canadians defeated St. Boniface Saints 4-games-to-3

- 1987 Lost semi-final

St. Boniface Saints defeated Steinbach Hawks 4-games-to-none
Winnipeg South Blues defeated St. Boniface Saints 4-games-to-none

- 1988 Lost quarter-final

St. James Canadians defeated St. Boniface Saints 4-games-to-1

- 1989 Lost quarter-final

Kildonan North Stars defeated St. Boniface Saints 4-games-to-none

- 1990 DNQ
- 1991 Lost quarter-final

St. James Canadians defeated St. Boniface Saints 4-games-to-3

- 1992 Lost quarter-final

Winnipeg South Blues defeated St. Boniface Saints 4-games-to-2

- 1993 Lost final

St. Boniface Saints defeated Selkirk Steelers 4-games-to-none
St. Boniface Saints defeated Winnipeg South Blues 4-games-to-1
Dauphin Kings defeated St. Boniface Saints 4-games-to-none

- 1994 Won League, lost Anavet Cup

St. Boniface Saints defeated Southeast Blades 4-games-to-1
St. Boniface Saints defeated St. James Canadians 4-games-to-1
St. Boniface Saints defeated Winkler Flyers 4-games-to-2 MJHL CHAMPIONS
Weyburn Red Wings (SJHL) defeated St. Boniface Saints 4-games-to-3

- 1995 Lost semi-final

St. Boniface Saints defeated Southeast Blades 4-games-to-none
Winnipeg South Blues defeated St. Boniface Saints 4-games-to-3

- 1996 Lost quarter-final

Winnipeg South Blues defeated St. Boniface Saints 4-games-to-3

- 1997 Lost quarter-final

Selkirk Steelers defeated St. Boniface Saints 4-games-to-3

- 1998 Lost quarter-final

Winnipeg South Blues defeated St. Boniface Saints 4-games-to-3

- 1999 Lost semi-final

St. Boniface Saints defeated St. James Canadians 4-games-to-2
Winnipeg South Blues defeated St. Boniface Saints 4-games-to-3

- 2000 DNQ
- 2001 Lost quarter-final

Winnipeg South Blues defeated Winnipeg Saints 4-games-to-3

- 2002 DNQ
- 2003 DNQ
- 2004 Lost semi-final

Winnipeg Saints defeated Winkler Flyers 4-games-to-2
Selkirk Steelers defeated Winnipeg Saints 4-games-to-2

- 2005 Lost quarter-final

Selkirk Steelers defeated Winnipeg Saints 4-games-to-1

- 2006 Lost quarter-final

Selkirk Steelers defeated Winnipeg Saints 4-games-to-2

- 2007 Lost semi-final

Winnipeg Saints defeated Winnipeg South Blues 4-games-to-3
Selkirk Steelers defeated Winnipeg Saints 4-games-to-none

- 2008 Lost final

Winnipeg Saints defeated Winnipeg South Blues 4-games-to-1
Winnipeg Saints defeated Winkler Flyers 4-games-to-1
Portage Terriers defeated Winnipeg Saints 4-games-to-1

- 2009 Lost semi-final

Winnipeg Saints defeated Neepawa Natives 4-games-to-none
Selkirk Steelers defeated Winnipeg Saints 4-games-to-2

- 2010 Lost final

Winnipeg Saints defeated Winnipeg South Blues 4-games-to-none
Winnipeg Saints defeated Winkler Flyers 4-games-to-none
Dauphin Kings defeated Winnipeg Saints 4-games-to-none

- 2011 Lost quarter-final

Selkirk Steelers defeated Winnipeg Saints 4-games-to-1

- 2012 Lost final

Winnipeg Saints defeated Dauphin Kings 4-games-to-1
Winnipeg Saints defeated OCN Blizzard 4-games-to-2
Portage Terriers defeated Winnipeg Saints 4-games-to-1

== See also ==
- List of ice hockey teams in Manitoba
