= 2013–14 MJHL season =

- League: Manitoba Junior Hockey League
- Sport: Ice hockey
- Games: 330
- Teams: 11

Regular Season
- First Place: Selkirk Steelers
- Season MVP: Parker Thomas
- Top scorer: Parker Thomas

Playoffs
- Addison Division champions: Winnipeg Blues
- Sherwood Division champions: Dauphin Kings

Turnbull Cup
- Champions: Winnipeg Blues

List of MJHL seasons
- ← 2012–13 2014–15 →

The 2013–14 season was the Manitoba Junior Hockey League's (MJHL) 97th season of operation.

The Selkirk Steelers posted the best record in the regular season with 49 win and 102 points. The Steelers, however, could not advance past the first round, as they were defeated by the Winnipeg Blues, the eventual Turnbull Cup champions. This was the Blues' 17th MJHL championship in franchise history.

The Winnipeg Blues and Dauphin Kings both participated in the 2014 Western Canada Cup in Dauphin. The Kings advanced as far as the 2014 Royal Bank Cup semi-finals before being eliminated.

== Season highlights ==
- The league changes its playoff structure, adding a best-of-three "survivor series" where the fourth and fifth place teams compete for the final playoff berth in each division.
- This is the last year of divisional play in the MJHL. The league moves to a one-division format next year.

== Standings ==
| Addison Division | GP | W | L | OTL | Pts | GF | GA |
|---|---|---|---|---|---|---|---|
| Selkirk Steelers | 60 | 49 | 7 | 4 | 102 | 224 | 119 |
| Steinbach Pistons | 60 | 42 | 16 | 2 | 86 | 213 | 146 |
| Portage Terriers | 60 | 36 | 16 | 8 | 80 | 205 | 150 |
| Winnipeg Blues | 60 | 31 | 23 | 6 | 68 | 198 | 172 |
| Winkler Flyers | 60 | 20 | 36 | 4 | 44 | 171 | 226 |
| Sherwood Division | GP | W | L | OTL | Pts | GF | GA |
| Dauphin Kings | 60 | 40 | 17 | 3 | 83 | 222 | 168 |
| Virden Oil Capitals | 60 | 32 | 24 | 4 | 68 | 202 | 175 |
| Swan Valley Stampeders | 60 | 27 | 30 | 3 | 57 | 206 | 240 |
| OCN Blizzard | 60 | 21 | 34 | 5 | 47 | 170 | 233 |
| Waywayseecappo Wolverines | 60 | 18 | 39 | 3 | 39 | 147 | 219 |
| Neepawa Natives | 60 | 14 | 41 | 5 | 33 | 146 | 272 |

== Playoffs ==
Survivor series
4 | Winnipeg | 2
5 | Winkler | 0
4 | OCN | 2
5 | Waywayseecappo | 0

Division semi-finals
1 | Selkirk | 1
4 | Winnipeg | 4
2 | Steinbach | 4
3 | Portage | 3
2 | Virden | 4
3 | Swan Valley | 2
1 | Dauphin | 4
4 | OCN | 0

Division finals
4 | Winnipeg | 4
2 | Steinbach | 1
2 | Virden | 0
1 | Dauphin | 4

Finals
4 | Winnipeg | 4
1 | Dauphin | 1

=== Most MJHL playoffs ===
Western Canada Cup

- Dauphin hosts the 2014 Western Canada Cup
- Dauphin Kings finish first in round robin; defeated by Yorkton Terriers 5–4 in championship game; defeat Spruce Grove Saints 4–3 in runner-up game to claim the second Western seed for the Royal Bank Cup.
- Winnipeg Blues finish fifth in round robin and eliminated from playoffs.

Royal Bank Cup

- Kings finish first in round robin; defeated 6–3 by Vernon Vipers in semi-final.

== League awards ==
- Steve "Boomer" Hawrysh Award (MVP): Parker Thomas, Selkirk
- MJHL Top Goaltender Award: Braeden Ostepchuk, Selkirk
- Brian Kozak Award (Top Defenceman): Joel Messner, Selkirk
- Vince Leah Trophy (Rookie of the Year): Tyler Jeanson, Portage
- Lorne Lyndon Memorial Trophy (Hockey Ability and Sportsmanship): Max Flanagan, Swan Valley
- Muzz McPherson Award (Coach of the Year): Ryan Smith, Selkirk
- Mike Ridley Trophy (Scoring Champion): Parker Thomas, Selkirk
- MJHL Playoff MVP: Byron Spriggs, Winnipeg

=== CJHL awards ===
- CJHL Player of the Year (MJHL): Braeden Ostepchuk, Selkirk
