= 2016–17 MJHL season =

- League: Manitoba Junior Hockey League
- Sport: Ice hockey
- Games: 330
- Teams: 11

Regular Season
- First Place: Steinbach Pistons
- Season MVP: Brady Keeper
- Top scorer: Jeremy Leipsic

Turnbull Cup
- Champions: Portage Terriers
- Runners-up: OCN Blizzard
- Playoff MVP: Jeremey Leipsic

List of MJHL seasons
- ← 2015–16 2017–18 →

The 2016–17 season was the Manitoba Junior Hockey League's (MJHL) 100th season of operation. Players and officials wore patches to commemorate Hockey Manitoba and the MJHL's centennial anniversary.

The Steinbach Pistons finished with league's best regular season record for the first time in their franchise's history, however were defeated by the two-time defending champion Portage Terriers in the semi-finals. The Terriers, despite finishing fifth overall in the regular season, won the Turnbull Cup for a third consecutive season by defeating the OCN Blizzard in the final.

== Season highlights ==
- The league announces the discontinuation of the Survivor Series playoff round. Only the top eight teams now advance to the playoffs.
- Three-on-three play is adopted for overtime during the regular season.
- The annual Showcase moves from October to December, with this year's event held December 12–14 at the MTS Iceplex.
- In December 2016, the Opaskwayak Cree Nation band council announce their intention to fold the OCN Blizzard following the conclusion of the season. After the Blizzard's board of directors make a pitch to operate the team independently, the council permits the team to continue but without funding from the band.

== Standings ==
	GP	W	L	OTL	SOL	Pts	GF	GA
Steinbach Pistons	60	49	10	1	0	99	249	124
Winkler Flyers	60	41	16	2	1	85	219	148
OCN Blizzard	60	39	17	3	1	82	200	153
Selkirk Steelers	60	39	18	3	0	81	220	177
Portage Terriers	60	37	19	1	3	78	256	198
Winnipeg Blues	60	27	27	3	3	60	193	202
Virden Oil Capitals	60	26	26	5	3	60	167	198
Neepawa Natives	60	21	33	3	3	48	173	229
Swan Valley Stampeders	60	20	34	5	1	46	160	236
Dauphin Kings	60	17	35	5	2	41	145	221
Waywayseecappo Wolverines	60	14	42	4	0	32	177	273

== Playoffs ==
Quarterfinals
1	Steinbach	4
8	Neepawa	2
2	Winkler	4
7	Virden	2
3	OCN	4
6	Winnipeg	1
4	Selkirk	2
5	Portage	4

Semifinals
1	Steinbach	2
5	Portage	4
2	Winkler	0
3	OCN	4

Turnbull Cup Finals
3	OCN	2
5	Portage	4

=== Post MJHL playoffs ===
Western Canada Cup

- Portage Terriers finish fifth in round robin and are eliminated from playoffs.
- Hockey Canada announces the end of the Western Canada Cup format. The MJHL and Saskatchewan Junior Hockey League will resume their Anavet Cup rivalry next season.

== League awards ==
- Steve "Boomer" Hawrysh Award (MVP): Brady Keeper, OCN
- MJHL Top Goaltender Award: Roman Bengert, Steinbach
- Brian Kozak Award (Top Defenceman): Brady Keeper, OCN
- Vince Leah Trophy (Rookie of the Year): Cole Weaver, Winkler
- Lorne Lyndon Memorial Trophy (Hockey Ability and Sportsmanship): Jeremey Leipsic, Portage
- Muzz McPherson Award (Coach of the Year): Paul Dyck, Steinbach
- Mike Ridley Trophy (Scoring Champion): Jeremey Leipsic, Portage
- MJHL Playoff MVP: Jeremey Leipsic, Portage

== See also ==
- 2017 Western Canada Cup
- 2017 Royal Bank Cup
