= 2015–16 MJHL season =

- League: Manitoba Junior Hockey League
- Sport: Ice hockey
- Games: 330
- Teams: 11

Regular Season
- First Place: Portage Terriers
- Season MVP: Brad Bowles
- Top scorer: Brad Bowles

Turnbull Cup
- Champions: Portage Terriers
- Runners-up: Steinbach Pistons
- Playoff MVP: Brad Bowles

List of MJHL seasons
- ← 2014–15 2016–17 →

The 2015–16 season was the Manitoba Junior Hockey League's (MJHL) 99th season of operation.

This season was a near carbon copy of the previous season as the Portage Terriers dominated the league for the second year in a row. The Terriers posted the best regular season record with 106 points and defeated the second-place team, the Steinbach Pistons, in the finals for their tenth Turnbull Cup. Unlike the previous season, the Terriers were not able to advance past the 2016 Western Canada Cup.

== Highlights ==
- Terriers' head coach Blake Spiller wins the Canadian Junior Hockey League Coach of the Year award for the second consecutive season.
- 2016 NHL entry draft: Portage Terriers defenceman Dean Stewart is selected 188th overall by the Arizona Coyotes.

== Standings ==
| | GP | W | L | OTL | SOL | Pts | GF | GA |
|---|---|---|---|---|---|---|---|---|
| Portage Terriers | 60 | 52 | 6 | 1 | 1 | 106 | 276 | 123 |
| Steinbach Pistons | 60 | 45 | 10 | 0 | 5 | 95 | 251 | 138 |
| Winkler Flyers | 60 | 42 | 13 | 1 | 4 | 89 | 260 | 153 |
| Virden Oil Capitals | 60 | 37 | 21 | 2 | 0 | 76 | 195 | 141 |
| Winnipeg Blues | 60 | 32 | 18 | 4 | 6 | 74 | 212 | 174 |
| OCN Blizzard | 60 | 27 | 30 | 2 | 1 | 57 | 185 | 214 |
| Swan Valley Stampeders | 60 | 22 | 29 | 6 | 3 | 53 | 174 | 207 |
| Selkirk Steelers | 60 | 23 | 31 | 3 | 3 | 52 | 196 | 255 |
| Dauphin Kings | 60 | 21 | 33 | 4 | 2 | 48 | 181 | 246 |
| Waywayseecappo Wolverines | 60 | 16 | 39 | 2 | 3 | 37 | 151 | 250 |
| Neepawa Natives | 60 | 13 | 45 | 2 | 0 | 28 | 132 | 312 |

== Playoffs ==
Survivor Series
7 | Swan Valley | 2
10 | Waywayseecappo | 0
8 | Selkirk | 2
9 | Dauphin | 0

Quarterfinals
1 | Portage | 4
8 | Selkirk | 0
2 | Steinbach | 4
7 | Swan Valley | 0
3 | Winkler | 4
6 | OCN | 1
4 | Virden | 3
5 | Winnipeg | 4

Semifinals
1 | Portage | 4
5 | Winnipeg | 0
2 | Steinbach | 4
3 | Winkler | 3

Turnbull Cup Finals
1 | Portage | 4
2 | Steinbach | 1

=== Post MJHL playoffs ===
Western Canada Cup

- Portage Terriers finish third in round robin; defeated by Melfort Mustangs 3–2 in semi-final; defeated by Brooks Bandits 2–1 in runner-up game.

== League awards ==
- Steve "Boomer" Hawrysh Award (MVP): Brad Bowles, Portage
- MJHL Top Goaltender Award: Nathan Park, Portage
- Brian Kozak Award (Top Defenceman): Brett Orr, Portage
- Vince Leah Trophy (Rookie of the Year): Nick Henry, Portage
- Lorne Lyndon Memorial Trophy (Hockey Ability and Sportsmanship): Dan Taillefer, Steinbach
- Muzz McPherson Award (Coach of the Year): Blake Spiller, Portage
- Mike Ridley Trophy (Scoring Champion): Brad Bowles, Portage
- MJHL Playoff MVP: Brad Bowles, Portage

=== CJHL awards ===
- CJHL Player of the Year (MJHL): Chase Brakel, Portage
- CJHL Coach of the Year: Blake Spiller, Portage
- CJHL Western All-star Team: Brad Bowles, Portage
