= 2010–11 MJHL season =

- League: Manitoba Junior Hockey League
- Sport: Ice hockey
- Games: 341
- Teams: 11

Regular Season
- First Place: Portage Terriers
- Season MVP: Shane Luke
- Top scorer: Shane Luke

Playoffs
- Addison Division champions: Selkirk Steelers
- Sherwood Division champions: Portage Terriers
- Playoffs MVP: Tyler Moore

Turnbull Cup
- Champions: Portage Terriers

List of MJHL seasons
- ← 2009–10 2011–12 →

The 2010–11 season was the Manitoba Junior Hockey League's (MJHL) 94th season of operation.

The Portage Terriers posted the best record in the regular season and won their seventh Turnbull Cup. The Terriers advanced as far as the 2011 Royal Bank Cup, but did not qualify for the national semi-finals.

== Season highlights ==
- Three teams relocate to new arenas:
  - The Winnipeg Saints move to the St. Adolphe Arena for one season.
  - The Winnipeg South Blues move to the MTS Iceplex and change name to the Winnipeg Blues.
  - The Portage Terriers move to the newly constructed 1,975-seat Portage Credit Union Centre in Portage la Prairie.
- The Waywayseecappo Wolverines crossover to qualify for the Addison Division semi-finals.
- The league holds its annual showcase event October 8–10 at the MTS Iceplex.
- 2011 NHL entry draft: Portage Terriers goaltender Jason Kasdorf is selected 157th overall by the Winnipeg Jets.

== Standings ==
Addison Division	GP	W	L	OTL	Pts	GF	GA
Winkler Flyers	62	38	17	7	83	228	191
Selkirk Steelers	62	36	17	8	81	246	215
Winnipeg Saints	62	31	30	1	63	220	229
Winnipeg Blues	62	18	32	12	48	215	284
Steinbach Pistons	62	19	40	3	41	202	276
Sherwood Division	GP	W	L	OTL	Pts	GF	GA
Portage Terriers	62	40	15	7	87	225	163
Dauphin Kings	62	39	20	3	81	244	197
OCN Blizzard	62	34	18	10	78	178	158
Swan Valley Stampeders	62	33	23	6	72	174	185
Waywayseecappo Wolverines	62	29	26	7	65	207	203
Neepawa Natives	62	24	32	6	54	170	204

== Playoffs ==
Division semi-finals
1	Winkler	4
4*	Waywayseecappo	2
Addison Division
2	Selkirk	4
3	Wpg Saints	1
1	Portage	4
4	Swan Valley	2
Sherwood Division
2	Dauphin	4
3	OCN	3

Division finals
1	Winkler	2
2	Selkirk	4
1	Portage	4
2	Dauphin	2

Finals
2	Selkirk	1
1	Portage	4

=== Post MJHL playoffs ===
Anavet Cup

- Portage Terriers defeat La Ronge Ice Wolves 4-games-to-3

Royal Bank Cup

- Terriers finish fifth in the round robin and are eliminated from playoffs.

== League awards ==
- Steve "Boomer" Hawrysh Award (MVP): Shane Luke, Dauphin
- MJHL Top Goaltender Award: Matthew Krahn, OCN
- Brian Kozak Award (Top Defenceman): Clark Bzczynski, Swan Valley
- Vince Leah Trophy (Rookie of the Year): Bryn Chyzyk, Dauphin
- Lorne Lyndon Memorial Trophy (Hockey Ability and Sportsmanship): Shane Luke, Dauphin
- Muzz McPherson Award (Coach of the Year): Scott McMillan, OCN
- Mike Ridley Trophy (Scoring Champion): Shane Luke, Dauphin
- MJHL Playoff MVP: Tyler Moore, Portage

=== CJHL awards ===
- CJAHL Player of the Year (MJHL): Shane Luke, Dauphin
