= 2011–12 MJHL season =

- League: Manitoba Junior Hockey League
- Sport: Ice hockey
- Games: 341
- Teams: 11

Regular Season
- First Place: Dauphin Kings
- Season MVP: Jayson Argue
- Top scorer: Jesse Sinatynski

Playoffs
- Addison Division champions: Portage Terriers
- Sherwood Division champions: Winnipeg Saints
- Playoffs MVP: Kajon McKay

Turnbull Cup
- Champions: Portage Terriers

List of MJHL seasons
- ← 2010–11 2012–13 →

The 2011–12 season was the Manitoba Junior Hockey League's (MJHL) 95th season of operation.

== Season highlights ==
- The Winnipeg Saints relocate to the St. James Civic Centre in Winnipeg. This is the final season for the Saints, who permanently relocate to Virden after season's end.
- The Portage Terriers switch to the Addison division.
- The Terriers defeat the Saints in the final to win their second consecutive Turnbull Cup. The Saints are the first (and only) team in MJHL history to win a playoff round as a crossover team.
- The Neepawa Natives are involved in a hazing scandal after a 15-year-old player comes forward with allegations of sexual-based rookie hazing in the team's locker room. A $5,000 fine and 18 player suspensions are handed down by the league following an investigation. Neepawa's head coach/general manager and assistant coach are later handed indefinite suspensions. The club gains further negative publicity when they refuse to release or trade the player who brought the issue to light.

== Standings ==
Addison Division	GP	W	L	OTL	Pts	GF	GA
Portage Terriers	62	42	15	5	89	265	185
Winnipeg Blues	62	38	19	5	81	249	202
Winkler Flyers	62	37	21	4	78	268	219
Selkirk Steelers	62	37	23	2	76	241	213
Winnipeg Saints	62	34	22	6	74	224	214
Steinbach Pistons	62	15	41	6	36	185	316
Sherwood Division	GP	W	L	OTL	Pts	GF	GA
Dauphin Kings	62	42	15	5	87	248	193
OCN Blizzard	61	31	23	7	69	173	179
Swan Valley Stampeders	62	27	27	8	62	200	216
Waywayseecappo Wolverines	62	26	27	9	61	207	201
Neepawa Natives	61	12	45	4	28	166	288

== Playoffs ==
Division semi-finals
1	Portage	4
4	Selkirk	0
Addision Division
2	Wpg Blues	4
3	Winkler	0
1	Dauphin	1
4*	Wpg Saints	4
Sherwood Division
2	OCN	4
3	Swan Valley	2

Division finals
1	Portage	4
2	Wpg Blues	2
4*	Wpg Saints	4
2	OCN	2

Finals
1	Portage	4
4*	Wpg Saints	1

=== Post MJHL playoffs ===
Anavet Cup

- Portage Terriers defeated by Humboldt Broncos 4-games-to-3. Terriers advance to Royal Bank Cup as Humboldt is the host team.

Royal Bank Cup

- Terriers finish fifth and eliminated from playoffs.

== League awards ==
- Steve "Boomer" Hawrysh Award (MVP): Jayson Argue, Swan Valley
- MJHL Top Goaltender Award: Jayson Argue, Swan Valley
- Brian Kozak Award (Top Defenceman): Brendan Kotyk, Dauphin
- Vince Leah Trophy (Rookie of the Year): Tanner Jago, Winkler
- Lorne Lyndon Memorial Trophy (Hockey Ability and Sportsmanship): Derek Gingera, Wpg Blues
- Muzz McPherson Award (Coach of the Year): Don MacGillivray, Wpg Blues
- Mike Ridley Trophy (Scoring Champion): Jesse Sinatynski, Dauphin
- MJHL Playoff MVP: Kajon McKay, Portage
- CJAHL Player of the Year (MJHL): Jayson Argue, Swan Valley
