= 2017–18 MJHL season =

- League: Manitoba Junior Hockey League
- Sport: Ice hockey
- Games: 330
- Teams: 11

Regular Season
- First Place: Steinbach Pistons
- Season MVP: Dexter Kuczek
- Top scorer: Dexter Kuczek

Turnbull Cup
- Champions: Steinbach Pistons
- Runners-up: Virden Oil Capitals
- Playoff MVP: Drew Worrad

List of MJHL seasons
- ← 2016–17 2018–19 →

The 2017–18 season was the Manitoba Junior Hockey League's (MJHL) 101st year of operation. The Steinbach Pistons finished with best regular season record for the second consecutive year and defeated the Virden Oil Capitals to win their second Turnbull Cup.

== Season notes ==
- The annual Showcase takes place at the MTS Iceplex December 10–11, 2017.
- The MJHL and SJHL hold a joint showcase in Regina, Saskatchewan January 15–16, 2018.
- The league announces the annual Prospects Development Camp takes place in Winnipeg July 26–29, 2018. A U.S. Prospects Camp is held in Grand Forks, North Dakota in May 2018.
- The MJHL announces that the Lyndon Lorne Memorial Trophy will be retired and replaced by the Frank McKinnon Memorial Trophy.
- The league reduces the number of 20-year old players each team can play in a game from nine to eight.
- Steinbach Pistons head coach Paul Dyck registers his 250th MJHL win as a coach in his 376th game, the fastest to reach that milestone in league history.
- The MJHL delays the second game of the Turnbull Cup finals by four days in response to the Humboldt Broncos bus crash in Saskatchewan on April 6, 2018. The Steinbach Pistons defeat the Virden Oil Capitals 4-games-to-2 to win their second league championship.
- The ANAVET Cup is re-instated after Hockey Canada and the Canadian Junior Hockey League discontinue the Western Canada Cup. The Steinbach Pistons defeat the Nipawin Hawks 4-games-to-2 to win the ANAVET Cup.
- 2018 NHL entry draft: Steinbach Pistons goaltender Matthew Thiessen is selected in 7th round, 192nd pick overall by the Vancouver Canucks.

== Standings ==
	GP	W	L	OTL	SOL	Pts	GF	GA
Steinbach Pistons	60	48	8	2	2	100	296	130
Virden Oil Capitals	60	40	17	2	1	83	268	181
Portage Terriers	60	38	16	3	3	82	251	163
OCN Blizzard	60	32	20	5	3	72	209	192
Winkler Flyers	60	35	25	0	0	70	205	175
Winnipeg Blues	60	31	22	5	2	69	215	220
Selkirk Steelers	60	31	25	3	1	66	192	206
Swan Valley Stampeders	60	28	25	6	1	63	206	206
Neepawa Natives	60	25	31	3	1	54	215	250
Dauphin Kings	60	14	44	1	1	30	148	289
Waywayseecappo Wolverines	60	8	48	3	1	20	130	323

== Playoffs ==
Quarterfinals
1	Steinbach	4
8	Swan Valley	0
2	Virden	4
7	Selkirk	1
3	Portage	2
6	Winnipeg	4
4	OCN	2
5	Winkler	4

Semifinals
1	Steinbach	4
6	Winnipeg	2
2	Virden	4
5	Winkler	0

Turnbull Cup Finals
1	Steinbach	4
2	Virden	2

=== Post MJHL playoffs ===
ANAVET Cup

- Steinbach Pistons defeated Nipawin Hawks 4-games-to-2

2018 Royal Bank Cup

- Steinbach Pistons finish fifth in the round robin and are eliminated from playoffs.

== League awards ==
- Steve "Boomer" Hawrysh Award (MVP): Dexter Kuczek, Winnipeg
- MJHL Top Goaltender Award: Troy Martyniuk, Winkler
- Brian Kozak Award (Top Defenceman): Darby Gula, Steinbach
- Vince Leah Trophy (Rookie of the Year): Justin Lee, Virden
- Frank McKinnon Memorial Trophy (Hockey Ability and Sportsmanship): Drew Worrad, Steinbach
- Muzz McPherson Award (Coach of the Year): Paul Dyck, Steinbach
- Mike Ridley Trophy (Scoring Champion): Dexter Kuczek, Winnipeg
- MJHL Playoff MVP: Drew Worrad, Steinbach

== See also ==
- ANAVET Cup
- 2018 Royal Bank Cup
