= 2012–13 MJHL season =

- League: Manitoba Junior Hockey League
- Sport: Ice hockey
- Games: 330
- Teams: 11

Regular Season
- First Place: Dauphin Kings
- Season MVP: Guillaume Naud
- Top scorer: Jesse Sinatynski

Playoffs
- Addison Division champions: Steinbach Pistons
- Sherwood Division champions: Dauphin Kings
- Playoffs MVP: Corey Koop

Turnbull Cup
- Champions: Steinbach Pistons

List of MJHL seasons
- ← 2011–12 2013–14 →

The 2012–13 season was the Manitoba Junior Hockey League's (MJHL) 96th season of operation.

== Season highlights ==
- The Winnipeg Saints are sold to a group from Virden in April 2012 and relocate to the southwestern Manitoba community. The team is renamed the Virden Oil Capitals and moves to the Sherwood Division. The Winnipeg Blues are now the sole team based in Winnipeg.
- The Steinbach Pistons are purchased by a group of local investors and become a community-owned organization.
- The league shortens its regular season schedule from 341 games to 330. Each team plays two fewer games as a result.
- The league holds its annual showcase event October 4–6 at the MTS Iceplex.
- The Steinbach Pistons join the MJHL playoffs for the first time in ten years, defeat the two-time defending champion Portage Terriers, and then upset the league's top two teams from the regular season, the Winnipeg Blues and Dauphin Kings, to win their organization's first ever Turnbull Cup.
- The Pistons qualify for the newly created Western Canada Cup, but do not advance past the round robin.

== Standings ==
| Addison Division | GP | W | L | OTL | Pts | GF | GA |
|---|---|---|---|---|---|---|---|
| Winnipeg Blues | 60 | 45 | 14 | 1 | 91 | 266 | 164 |
| Steinbach Pistons | 60 | 31 | 25 | 4 | 66 | 224 | 207 |
| Portage Terriers | 60 | 32 | 27 | 1 | 65 | 187 | 187 |
| Winkler Flyers | 60 | 22 | 27 | 11 | 55 | 199 | 224 |
| Selkirk Steelers | 60 | 25 | 30 | 5 | 55 | 203 | 210 |
| Sherwood Division | GP | W | L | OTL | Pts | GF | GA |
| Dauphin Kings | 60 | 47 | 11 | 2 | 96 | 266 | 149 |
| OCN Blizzard | 60 | 39 | 16 | 5 | 83 | 221 | 190 |
| Swan Valley Stampeders | 60 | 33 | 23 | 4 | 70 | 221 | 221 |
| Waywayseecappo Wolverines | 60 | 25 | 30 | 5 | 55 | 188 | 220 |
| Virden Oil Capitals | 60 | 18 | 34 | 8 | 44 | 155 | 212 |
| Neepawa Natives | 60 | 13 | 40 | 7 | 33 | 142 | 288 |

== Playoffs ==
Division semi-finals
1 | Winnipeg | 4
4 | Winkler | 2
Addision Division
2 | Steinbach | 4
3 | Portage | 3
1 | Dauphin | 4
4 | Waywayseecappo | 2
Sherwood Division
2 | OCN | 4
3 | Swan Valley | 1

Division finals
1 | Winnipeg | 2
2 | Steinbach | 4
1 | Dauphin | 4
2 | OCN | 3

Finals
2 | Steinbach | 4
1 | Dauphin | 2

=== Post MJHL playoffs ===
Western Canada Cup

- First year of the new format involving the four western leagues of the CJHL.
- Steinbach Pistons finish fifth in the round robin and are eliminated from playoffs.

== League awards ==
- Steve "Boomer" Hawrysh Award (MVP): Guillaume Naud, Dauphin
- MJHL Top Goaltender Award: Adam Iwan, Portage
- Brian Kozak Award (Top Defenceman): Tanner Butler, Dauphin
- Vince Leah Trophy (Rookie of the Year): Tristan Keck, Winkler
- Lorne Lyndon Memorial Trophy (Hockey Ability and Sportsmanship): Connor Cleverly, Winnipeg
- Muzz McPherson Award (Coach of the Year): Don MacGillivray, Winnipeg
- Mike Ridley Trophy (Scoring Champion): Jesse Sinatynski, Dauphin
- MJHL Playoff MVP: Corey Koop, Steinbach

=== CJHL awards ===
- CJHL Player of the Year (MJHL): Guillaume Naud, Dauphin
- CJHL Rookie of the Year: Tristan Keck, Winkler
