= 2009–10 MJHL season =

Manitoba ice hockey season

- League: Manitoba Junior Hockey League
- Sport: Ice hockey
- Games: 341
- Teams: 11

Regular Season
- First Place: Dauphin Kings
- Season MVP: Taylor Dickin
- Top scorer: Shane Luke

Playoffs
- Addison Division champions: Winnipeg Saints
- Sherwood Division champions: Dauphin Kings
- Playoffs MVP: Joe Caligiuri

Turnbull Cup
- Champions: Dauphin Kings

List of MJHL seasons
- ← 2008–09 2010–11 →

The 2009–10 season was the Manitoba Junior Hockey League's (MJHL) 93rd season of operation.

The Dauphin Kings were the best team in both the regular season and playoffs. The Kings hosted the 2010 Royal Bank Cup in Dauphin and advanced to the national championship game, but lost to the Vernon Vipers.

== Season highlights ==
- The Beausejour Blades relocate to Steinbach and are renamed the Steinbach Pistons.
- The MJHL showcase event is held Oct 9-11 at the Dakota Community Centre.
- Winkler hosts the CJHL Prospects game.
- The 2010 Royal Bank Cup is held in Dauphin, where the Dauphin Kings finish second overall.
- 2010 NHL entry draft
  - Winnipeg South Blues forward Brendan O'Donnell is selected 156th overall by the Tampa Bay Lightning.
  - Winnipeg South Blues defenceman Peter Stoykewych is selected 199th overall by the Atlanta Thrashers.

== Standings ==
Addison Division	GP	W	L	OTL	Pts	GF	GA
Winnipeg Saints	62	36	19	7	79	228	199
Selkirk Steelers	62	36	25	1	73	253	221
Winkler Flyers	62	29	25	8	66	216	216
Winnipeg South Blues	62	27	27	8	62	211	242
Steinbach Pistons	62	16	43	6	32	185	308
Sherwood Division	GP	W	L	OTL	Pts	GF	GA
Dauphin Kings	62	50	11	1	101	296	169
Portage Terriers	62	35	17	10	80	223	173
Swan Valley Stampeders	62	34	22	6	74	232	228
Neepawa Natives	62	34	24	4	72	205	189
OCN Blizzard	62	24	30	8	56	181	202
Waywayseecappo Wolverines	62	23	37	2	48	154	237

== Playoffs ==
Division semi-finals
1	Winnipeg	4
4	Winnipeg South	0
Addison Division
2	Selkirk	2
3	Winkler	4
1	Dauphin	4
4	Neepawa	0
Sherwood Division
2	Portage	1
3	Swan Valley	4

Division finals
1	Winnipeg	4
3	Winkler	0
1	Dauphin	4
3	Swan Valley	1

Finals
1	Winnipeg	0
1	Dauphin	4

=== Post MJHL playoffs ===
Anavet Cup

- Dauphin Kings defeat La Ronge Ice Wolves 4-games-to-1

Royal Bank Cup

- Dauphin hosts the 2010 Royal Bank Cup.
- The Dauphin Kings finish first in the round robin; defeat La Ronge Ice Wolves 6-2 in semi-final; defeated by Vernon Vipers 6-1 in national championship game.

== League awards ==
- Steve "Boomer" Hawrysh Award (MVP): Taylor Dickin, Selkirk
- MJHL Top Goaltender Award: David Aime, OCN
- Brian Kozak Award (Top Defenceman): Seven Shamanksi, Dauphin
- Vince Leah Trophy (Rookie of the Year): Brendan O'Donnell, Winnipeg South
- Lorne Lyndon Memorial Trophy (Hockey Ability and Sportsmanship): Shane Luke, Dauphin
- Muzz McPherson Award (Coach of the Year): Dwayne Kirkup, Swan Valley
- Mike Ridley Trophy (Scoring Champion): Shane Luke, Dauphin
- MJHL Playoff MVP: Joe Caliguiri, Dauphin

=== CJHL awards ===
- CJAHL Player of the Year (MJHL): Seven Shamanksi, Dauphin
