= Jason Kasdorf =

Canadian ice hockey player (born 1992)

- Born: May 18, 1992 (age 34) Winnipeg, Manitoba, Canada
- Height: 6 ft 4 in (193 cm)
- Weight: 200 lb (91 kg; 14 st 4 lb)
- Position: Goaltender
- Caught: Left
- Played for: Buffalo Sabres; Lausitzer Füchse
- NHL draft: 157th overall, 2011; Winnipeg Jets
- Playing career: 2016–2019

Jason Kasdorf (born May 18, 1992) is a Canadian former professional ice hockey goaltender. He was most recently under contract to the Manitoba Moose of the American Hockey League (AHL). Kasdorf was originally selected by the Winnipeg Jets in the sixth round (157th overall) of the 2011 NHL entry draft.

== Playing career ==
=== Amateur ===
Kasdorf attended Rensselaer Polytechnic Institute where he played with the NCAA Men's Division I RPI Engineers of the ECAC Hockey conference. In his freshman year, Kasdorf's outstanding play was rewarded when he was selected as the 2012–13 ECAC Hockey Rookie of the Year and was named to the All-ECAC Second Team.

=== Professional ===
On February 11, 2015, the Winnipeg Jets traded Kasdorf, along with Evander Kane and Zach Bogosian, to the Sabres in exchange for Tyler Myers, Drew Stafford, Joel Armia, Brendan Lemieux, and a conditional first-round pick in the 2015 NHL entry draft.

On March 14, 2016, Kasdorf signed a one-year, entry-level contract with the Buffalo Sabres of the National Hockey League. He made his NHL debut on April 8, 2016. At the conclusion of the season, Kasdorf having completed his brief rookie contract, agreed to a two-year extension on July 18, 2016.

Kasdorf failed to add to his lone appearance with the Sabres through the duration of his contract, and was further unable to gain a footing with primary affiliate, the Rochester Americans in the American Hockey League. He was assigned to the ECHL with secondary affiliates, the Elmira Jackals and the Cincinnati Cyclones.

As a restricted free agent, Kasdorf was not qualified by the Sabres and was released as a free agent on June 26, 2018. Un-signed over the summer, Kasdorf signed a professional tryout contract to join the Lehigh Valley Phantoms training camp on September 28, 2018 before he was released from his tryout on October 8. With limited contract offers, Kasdorf briefly signed in Europe with German club, Lausitzer Füchse of the DEL2. He made 2 appearances with the Foxes, both losses, in his only action for the 2018–19 season.

Kasdorf remained a free agent into the 2019–20 season, Kasdorf returned to his hometown in Winnipeg, Manitoba. On March 1, 2020, he was signed to a professional try-out with hometown club, the Manitoba Moose, to provide cover at the backup position.

== Career statistics ==
			Regular season									Playoffs
Season	Team	League	GP	W	L	T/OT	MIN	GA	SO	GAA	SV%	GP	W	L	MIN	GA	SO	GAA	SV%
2009–10	Portage Terriers	MJHL	35	19	10	5	2094	89	2	2.55	.911	3	0	3	191	11	0	3.46	.892
2010–11	Portage Terriers	MJHL	34	24	10	0	2018	85	2	2.53	.912	10	7	3	630	22	1	2.10	.919
2011–12	Des Moines Buccaneers	USHL	33	10	16	5	1750	100	3	3.43	.894	—	—	—	—	—	—	—	—
2012–13	R.P.I.	ECAC	23	14	5	2	1329	36	3	1.62	.935	—	—	—	—	—	—	—	—
2013–14	R.P.I.	ECAC	2	1	1	0	103	6	1	3.49	.786	—	—	—	—	—	—	—	—
2014–15	R.P.I.	ECAC	33	11	19	2	1816	90	1	2.97	.902	—	—	—	—	—	—	—	—
2015–16	R.P.I.	ECAC	30	12	12	5	1777	68	3	2.30	.931	—	—	—	—	—	—	—	—
2015–16	Buffalo Sabres	NHL	1	0	1	0	60	4	0	4.00	.867	—	—	—	—	—	—	—	—
2016–17	Rochester Americans	AHL	3	0	3	0	177	17	0	5.75	.828	—	—	—	—	—	—	—	—
2016–17	Elmira Jackals	ECHL	31	5	20	1	1621	107	1	3.96	.877	—	—	—	—	—	—	—	—
2017–18	Cincinnati Cyclones	ECHL	28	13	11	1	1520	77	1	3.04	.903	—	—	—	—	—	—	—	—
2017–18	Rochester Americans	AHL	1	0	0	0	20	1	0	3.00	.900	—	—	—	—	—	—	—	—
2018–19	Lausitzer Füchse	DEL2	2	0	2	0	98	8	0	4.88	.852	—	—	—	—	—	—	—	—
NHL totals			1	0	1	0	60	4	0	4.00	.867	—	—	—	—	—	—	—	—

== Awards and honors ==
Award	Year
College
ECAC Hockey Rookie of the Year	2012–13
All-ECAC Hockey Second Team	2012–13; 2015–16

Awards and achievements
Preceded by Brian Ferlin	ECAC Hockey Rookie of the Year; 2012–13	Succeeded by Sam Anas; Gavin Bayreuther
