= Peter Stoykewych =

Canadian ice hockey player

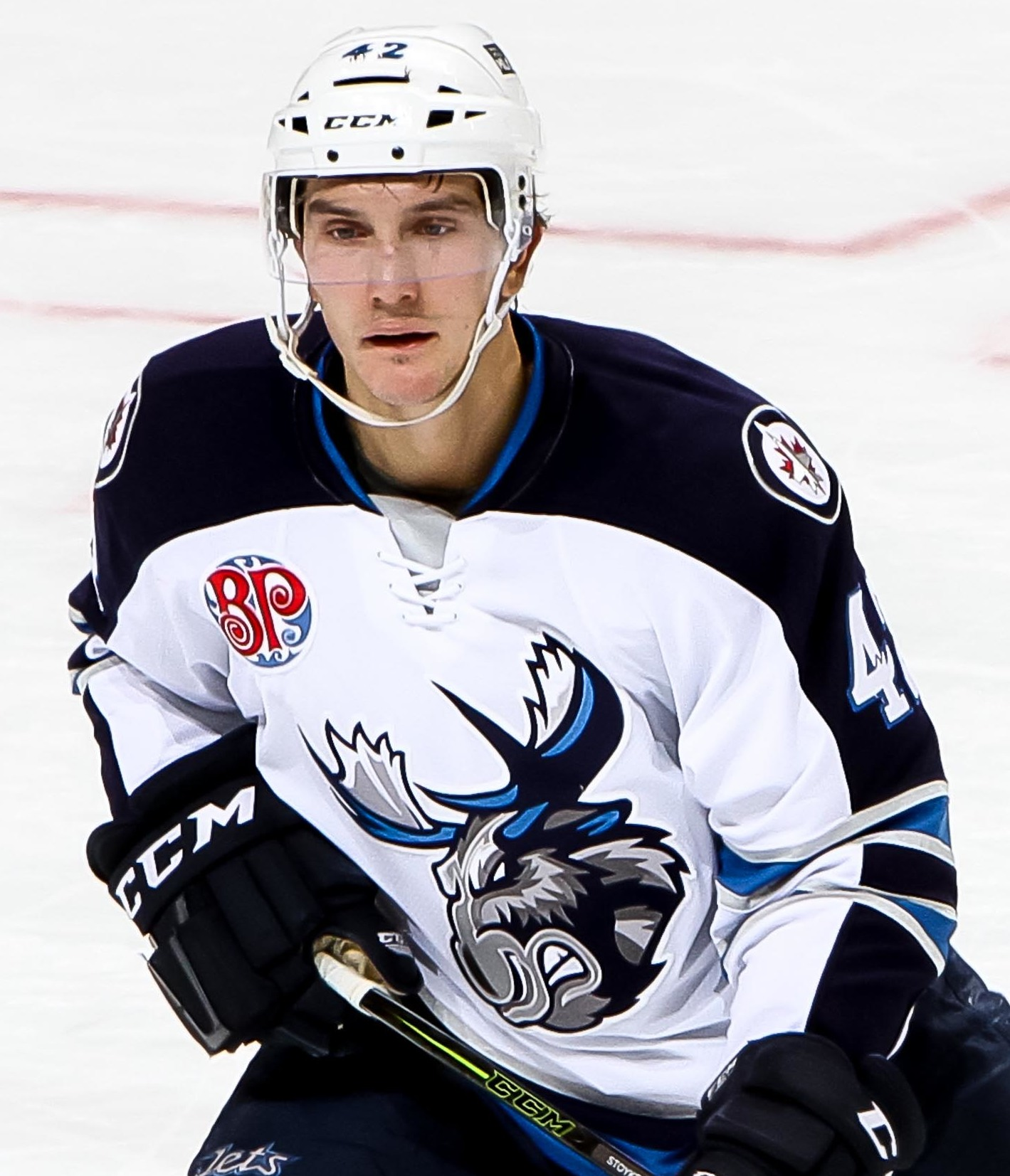
- Stoykewych with the Manitoba Moose during the 2015-16 season
- Born: 14 July 1992 (age 34) Winnipeg, Manitoba, Canada
- Height: 6 ft 3 in (191 cm)
- Weight: 200 lb (91 kg; 14 st 4 lb)
- Position: Defence
- Shot: Left
- Played for: St. John's IceCaps; Manitoba Moose
- NHL draft: 199th overall, 2010; Atlanta Thrashers
- Playing career: 2014–2020

Peter Justin Stoykewych (born July 14, 1992) is a Canadian former professional ice hockey defenceman and current American Hockey League (AHL) linesman. He most notably played for and served as captain with the Manitoba Moose of the AHL after being drafted by the Atlanta Thrashers in the 2010 NHL entry draft.

== Early life ==
Stoykewych was born on July 14, 1992, in Winnipeg, Manitoba to parents Andrew and Sheryl Stoykewych. His father serves on the staff of the Department of Surgery at the Health Sciences Centre and the Faculty of Dentistry at the University of Manitoba. Stoykewych is the middle child of three brothers, Adam and Paul, who also played hockey.

== Playing career ==
=== Junior ===
Growing up in Manitoba, Stoykewych played in the Assiniboine Park Minor Hockey Association with the Bantam AA Assiniboine Park Rangers and Bantam AAA Winnipeg Monarchs. Following this, he joined the Midget AAA Winnipeg Wild where he won the Top Defenceman Award during the month of October 2007. Stoykewych also played for the Manitoba Junior Hockey League’s Winnipeg Blues before being drafted by the Des Moines Buccaneers in the United States Hockey League (USHL).

He was selected by the Atlanta Thrashers in the seventh round, 199th overall, of the 2010 NHL entry draft, ultimately becoming the Thrashers' final ever draft pick before their relocation to Winnipeg, Manitoba to become the Winnipeg Jets. Despite his draft selection, Stoykewych opted to join the Colorado College Tigers to play four seasons of collegiate hockey.

=== Professional ===
In 2014, Stoykewych joined the American Hockey League's St. John's IceCaps, now the Manitoba Moose, in 2014 on a two-year contract. He signed one-year contracts with the Moose in 2016 and 2017, and signed another two-year contract in July 2018.

Prior to the start of the 2018–19 season, Stoykewych was named the captain of the Moose alongside alternatives JC Lipon and Cameron Schilling. On January 18, 2019, Stoykewych was suspended two games by the AHL as a result of an illegal check to the head on Milwaukee Admirals forward Phil Di Giuseppe. During the game, he had been assessed a two-minute minor penalty. Following his fifth season with the Moose and second as captain, Stoykewych announced his retirement from professional hockey on June 9, 2020, after the cancellation of the 2019–20 season due to the COVID-19 pandemic. At the time of his retirement, he ranked 10th amongst the teams' defencemen in games played with 267. Following his retirement, he was hired by the AHL as a linesman for the 2020–21 season.

== Career statistics ==
			Regular season					Playoffs
Season	Team	League	GP	G	A	Pts	PIM	GP	G	A	Pts	PIM
2007–08	Winnipeg Wild	MMHL	39	1	21	22	22	—	—	—	—	—
2008–09	Winnipeg South Blues	MJHL	53	4	12	16	33	—	—	—	—	—
2009–10	Winnipeg South Blues	MJHL	56	6	25	31	63	4	1	1	2	2
2010–11	Des Moines Buccaneers	USHL	58	5	10	15	77	—	—	—	—	—
2011–12	Colorado College	WCHA	26	0	3	3	14	—	—	—	—	—
2012–13	Colorado College	WCHA	42	2	9	11	20	—	—	—	—	—
2013–14	Colorado College	NCHC	37	1	8	9	46	—	—	—	—	—
2014–15	Colorado College	NCHC	34	3	8	11	42	—	—	—	—	—
2014–15	St. John's IceCaps	AHL	6	0	1	1	11	—	—	—	—	—
2015–16	Manitoba Moose	AHL	47	0	7	7	38	—	—	—	—	—
2016–17	Manitoba Moose	AHL	72	5	15	20	47	—	—	—	—	—
2017–18	Manitoba Moose	AHL	70	9	18	27	44	7	0	1	1	16
2018–19	Manitoba Moose	AHL	60	5	11	16	39	—	—	—	—	—
2019–20	Manitoba Moose	AHL	12	0	1	1	10	—	—	—	—	—
AHL totals			267	19	53	72	189	7	0	1	1	16

== Awards and honours ==
Award	Year
MJHL
All-Rookie Team	2009
Second All-Star Team	2010
College
WCHA All-Academic Team	2013
WCHA All-Tournament Team	2013
