= Frank McKinnon =

Canadian sports administrator (1934–2015)

- Born: June 16, 1934; Wellwood, Manitoba, Canada
- Died: May 31, 2015 (aged 80); Calgary, Alberta, Canada
- Occupations: Sports administrator; Educator

Frank Lorne McKinnon, CM (June 16, 1934 – May 31, 2015) was a Canadian sports administrator. He was a member of the International Ice Hockey Federation Congress, chairman of the Canadian Amateur Hockey Association (CAHA), and vice-president of the Canadian Olympic Association for one term. McKinnon was named a Member of the Order of Canada in June 2014 in recognition of his extensive volunteer work and contributions to amateur sport in Canada.

== Career ==
A teacher by trade, McKinnon received his post-secondary education at Brandon University, where he also starred on the school's hockey team. He became the principal of the high school in Carman, Manitoba in 1964 and later helped create the Manitoba High School Athletics Association, the governing body for high school athletics in the province. As the coach of Carman's high school hockey team, he once benched young star goaltender Ed Belfour, who went on to a Hall of Fame career in the National Hockey League.

McKinnon served on the board on the Manitoba Amateur Hockey Association (MAHA, now Hockey Manitoba) for 18 years (non-consecutive), five as president, during the 1960s, 1970s, and 1980s. As an advocate for youth sports, McKinnon played a significant role in the overhaul of Canadian junior hockey and the creation of a national Junior "A" championship in 1970. McKinnon was Canada's representative at the IIHF Congress during the mid-1970s and a member of the organizing committee for the first IIHF World Junior Ice Hockey Championships in 1974.

McKinnon was elected to the Canadian Amateur Hockey Association (CAHA) executive in 1975, as the vice-president of senior international hockey. He then served as first vice-president of the CAHA from 1977 to 1979. When the CAHA created an elected board of governors and restructured the role of president to a full-time, salaried position in 1979, McKinnon and then-president Gord Renwick both declared they would not apply for the paid position. Murray Costello was hired as the president, and McKinnon was elected the first chairman of the board of governors in 1979. He was succeeded by Tubby Schmalz in May 1981, but returned to the chairman's role upon Schmalz's death in December 1981. McKinnon retired again as CAHA chairman in May 1982.

After retiring from his education career in 1992, McKinnon took on the role of Commissioner for the Manitoba Junior Hockey League (MJHL), a position he held until 2002.

== Awards ==
Hockey Canada, the Canadian Junior Hockey League, and several national and provincial sport bodies have bestowed McKinnon with their awards and honours, including Hockey Canada's highest award, the Order of Merit. The MJHL has created the Frank McKinnon Memorial Trophy and the Frank McKinnon Scholarship in his honour. McKinnon has also been honoured for his volunteer work in other sports, including an induction into the Manitoba Baseball Hall of Fame.

McKinnon was named a member of the Order of Canada by His Excellency, the Right Honourable David Johnston, Governor General of Canada, in 2014 and formally inducted in a ceremony shortly before his death in 2015.

== Death ==
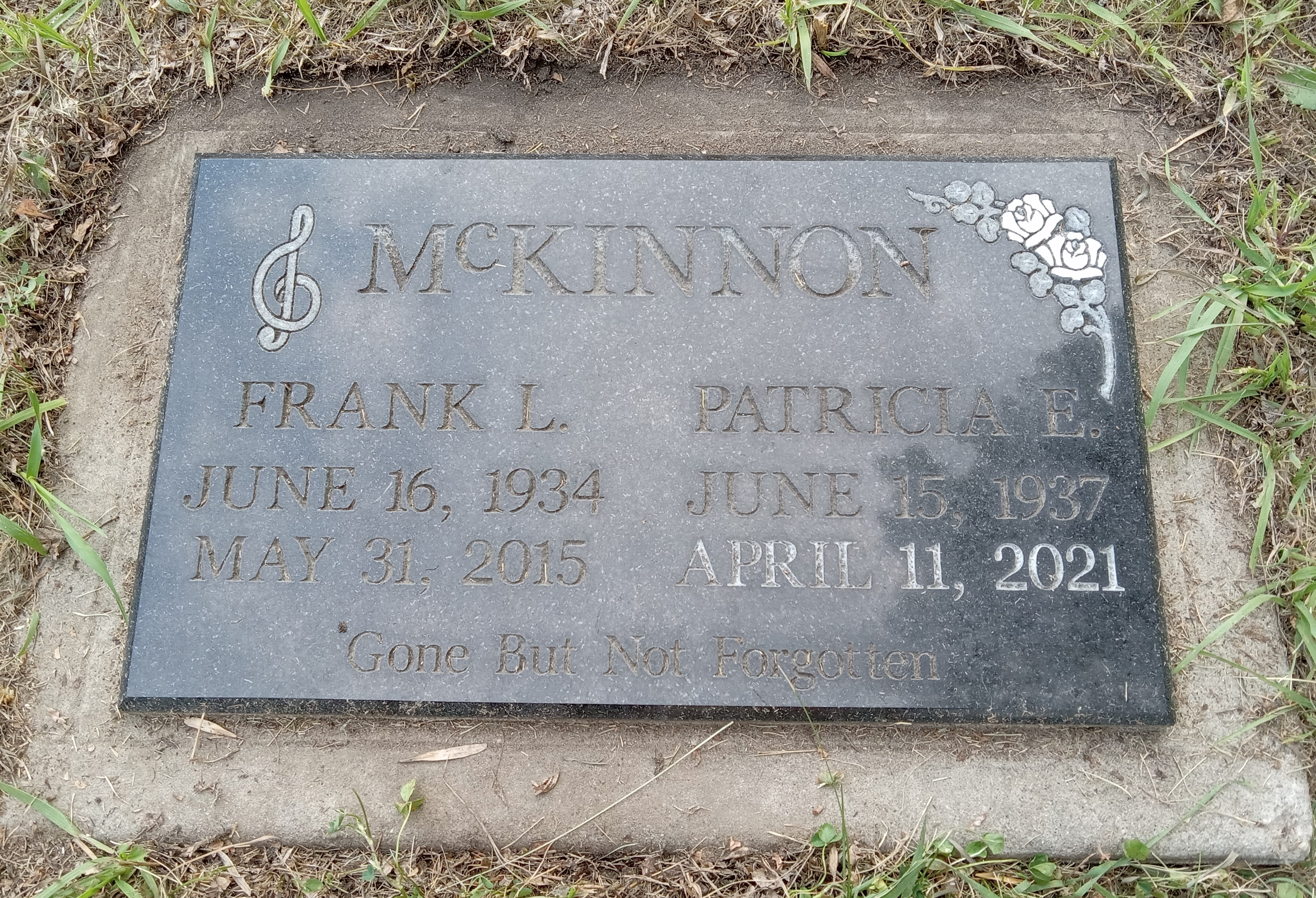
McKinnon's grave at Brandon Municipal Cemetery, Manitoba

McKinnon died in Calgary, Alberta on May 31, 2015, at the age of 80.
