= Brendan Lemieux =

Canadian ice hockey player (born 1996)

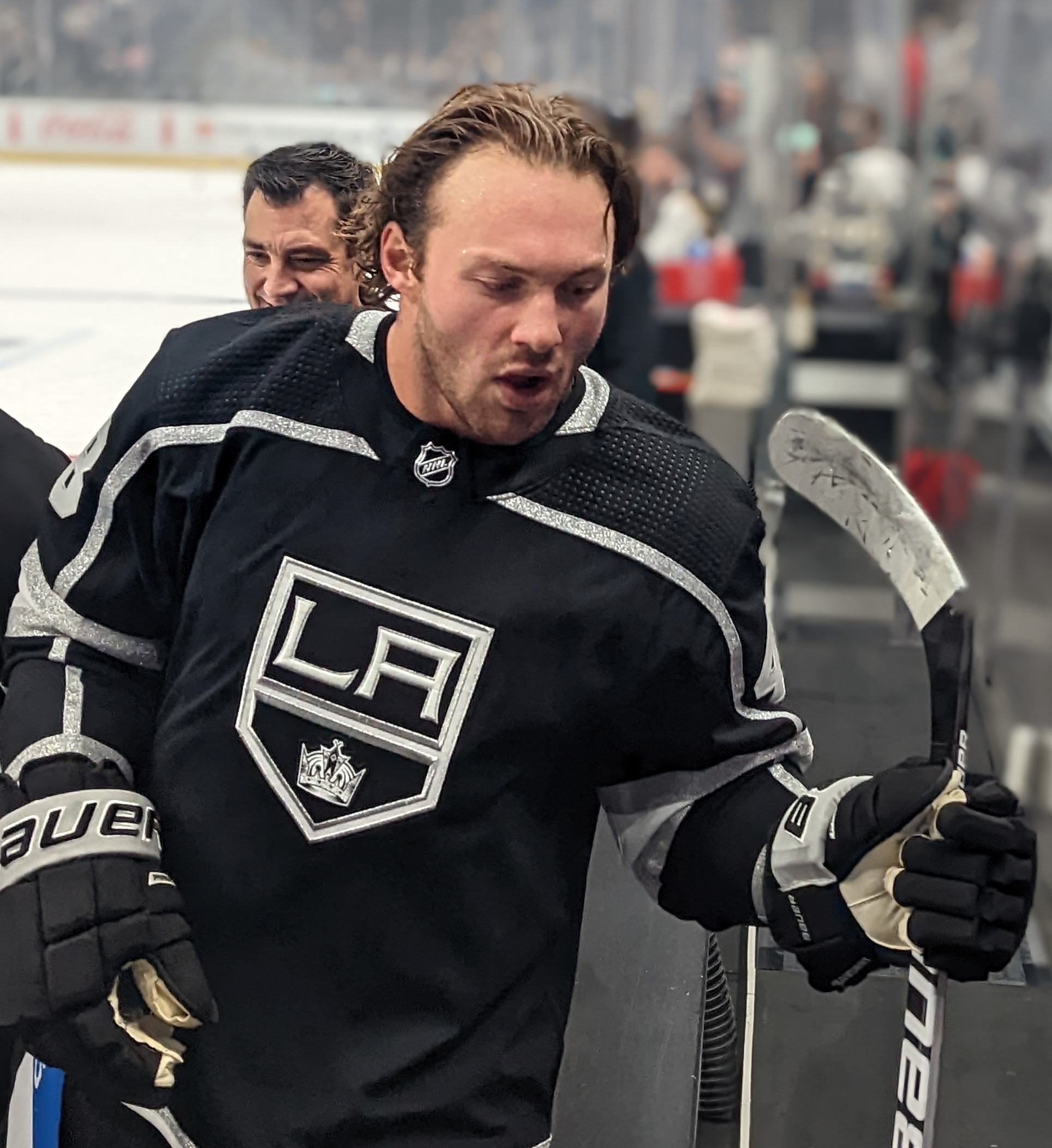
- Lemieux with the Los Angeles Kings in 2022.
- Born: March 15, 1996 (age 30) Denver, Colorado, U.S.
- Height: 6 ft 1 in (185 cm)
- Weight: 215 lb (98 kg; 15 st 5 lb)
- Position: Left wing
- Shoots: Left
- NL team Former teams: HC Davos; Winnipeg Jets; New York Rangers; Los Angeles Kings; Philadelphia Flyers; Carolina Hurricanes
- NHL draft: 31st overall, 2014; Buffalo Sabres
- Playing career: 2016–present

Brendan Lemieux (born March 15, 1996) is an American-Canadian professional ice hockey player who is a left winger for HC Davos in the National League (NL). He previously played for the Winnipeg Jets, New York Rangers, Los Angeles Kings, Philadelphia Flyers, and Carolina Hurricanes of the National Hockey League (NHL). He was selected by the Buffalo Sabres in the second round, 31st overall, of the 2014 NHL entry draft.

The son of the late former NHL player Claude Lemieux, Lemieux began playing hockey at a young age despite his father's wishes, and spent his minor ice hockey career in the Greater Toronto Hockey League and The Hill Academy. He agreed to spend two years with the Green Bay Gamblers of the United States Hockey League before attending the University of North Dakota, but abandoned both commitments after being drafted by the Barrie Colts of the Ontario Hockey League (OHL) in 2012. Lemieux's strong performance during his second year of junior ice hockey made him an attractive prospect going into the 2014 NHL draft, and his family was disappointed that he was not taken in the first round. While still playing with Barrie, Lemieux was traded to Winnipeg, with which he signed a contract in July 2015. He finished his junior hockey career with the Windsor Spitfires after a midseason trade during the 2015–16 OHL season.

Lemieux began his professional hockey career with the Manitoba Moose of the American Hockey League during the 2016–17 AHL season. He was selected to Winnipeg's NHL roster for the 2018–19 season, but received only limited ice time, and was traded to the Rangers that February for Kevin Hayes. His development during the 2019–20 NHL season was impeded by a fractured hand and the COVID-19 pandemic. During the 2020–21 season, Lemieux was traded to the Kings, where he followed his father into becoming a pest and agitator on the lower offensive lines.

== Early life ==
Lemieux was born on March 15, 1996, in Denver, where his father Claude was playing with the Colorado Avalanche of the National Hockey League (NHL). He was named after his father's former teammate with the New Jersey Devils, Brendan Shanahan. The oldest son of Claude and his second wife Deborah, Lemieux was a childhood friend of Wayne Gretzky's children. Lemieux was a competitive child and began playing ice hockey and baseball at a young age. Claude tried to steer his son away from hockey, worried that it would be difficult for a second-generation player to follow his successful father, especially considering Claude's reputation as a pest and enforcer, but he relented upon seeing Brendan's early skill at the sport.

In both 2008 and 2009, Lemieux participated in the Quebec International Pee-Wee Hockey Tournament with the Lemieux Academy team of Phoenix, Arizona. The following year, he played minor ice hockey with the Toronto Red Wings of the Greater Toronto Hockey League (GTHL), which was coached by his father. In addition to playing on these minor hockey teams, Lemieux also attended The Hill Academy, an independent Ontario-based high school for student athletes.

== Playing career ==
=== Junior ===
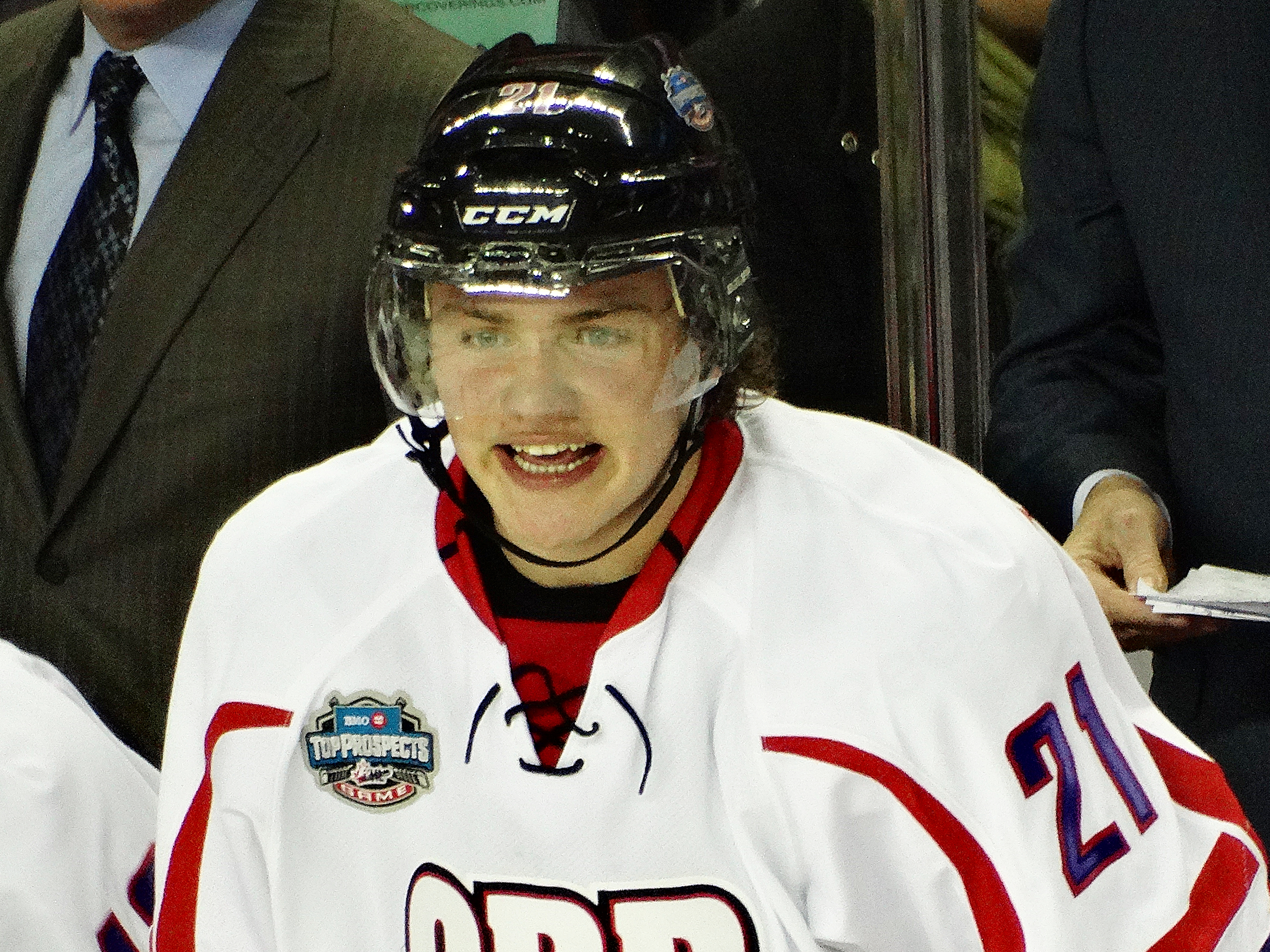
Lemieux in 2014

Upon the conclusion of his minor hockey career, Lemieux agreed to play for two years with the Green Bay Gamblers of the United States Hockey League (USHL), beginning in the 2012–13 season, before attending the University of North Dakota and playing college ice hockey for the Fighting Hawks, starting in 2014. Instead, when the Barrie Colts of the Ontario Hockey League (OHL) selected Lemieux in the fourth round, 69th overall, of the 2012 OHL Priority Selection, he forwent his commitment to UND and left Green Bay after only 11 games in order to pursue a junior ice hockey career in the OHL. At the time of his departure, Lemieux had recorded one goal and one assist apiece for Green Bay, as well as 34 penalty minutes. In addition to beginning the OHL season late, Lemieux received an eight-game suspension in December for an illegal check on Roland McKeown of the Kingston Frontenacs. The hit, which caused McKeown to suffer a separated shoulder and jeopardized his chances at playing in the 2013 World U-17 Hockey Challenge, was not initially penalized, a decision criticized by Frontenacs coach Todd Gill. Playing in 42 games during his rookie OHL season, Lemieux scored six goals and 14 points while recording 52 penalty minutes. He added an additional two goals in 21 playoff games before the Colts were eliminated by the Belleville Bulls in Game 7 of the Eastern Conference finals of the J. Ross Robertson Cup.

Going into the 2013–14 season, as well as his NHL draft year, Lemieux was promoted to a top-six role as a winger for Barrie. He recorded his first hat-trick on November 13, 2013, in a 7–1 win over the Sudbury Wolves. That winter, Lemieux and Aaron Ekblad were the two Colts selected for the 2014 CHL/NHL Top Prospects Game, where they played for Team Orr. In his second full season in Barrie, Lemieux scored 27 goals and 53 points while registering 145 penalty minutes in 65 regular season games. He also had seven goals and 10 points in 11 postseason games, including the game-winning goal in Game 4 against the Bulls, before the Colts were eliminated by the North Bay Battalion in the Eastern Conference semifinals. Over the course of the year, Lemieux jumped from No. 35 on the NHL Central Scouting Bureau's list of North American hockey prospects to No. 25 in the final rankings. Both Lemieux and his father were disappointed when Lemieux was not a first-round selection in the 2014 NHL entry draft – instead, he was the first pick of the second round, taken 31st overall by the Buffalo Sabres.

Although he practiced with Buffalo during their 2014 training camp, the Sabres returned Lemieux to Barrie for the 2014–15 season, where he served as one of four alternate captains. On February 11, 2015, Lemieux was part of a massive trade that saw him, Tyler Myers, Drew Stafford, Joel Armia, and a first-round pick in the 2015 NHL entry draft go to the Winnipeg Jets in exchange for Evander Kane, Zach Bogosian, and Jason Kasdorf. He was thrilled by the trade, which meant a reunion with former Barrie teammate and mentor Mark Scheifele, who had mentored Lemieux when the latter was a rookie. After scoring 41 goals and 60 points in 57 regular season OHL games, Lemieux signed a three-year, $3.375 million entry-level contract with the Jets on July 3, 2015. Although he missed several games, Lemieux also set a franchise record with 25 power play goals, one more than previous record holder Ryan Hamilton.

After he skated with Winnipeg during their training camp, the Jets returned Lemieux to Barrie for the 2015–16 season, his final year of junior hockey eligibility. On December 10, 2015, the Windsor Spitfires traded Anthony Stefano to Barrie in exchange for Lemieux; a number of picks in future OHL drafts were also exchanged. The Spitfires had considered acquiring Lemieux when he was playing in the USHL, even though the Colts were the ones who drafted him. At the time of the trade, Lemieux had played in only 11 games that season, missing 16 for a number of suspensions, including a 10-game benching for an illegal check to the head of an opponent. He was named the OHL Player of the Month for December, with 12 goals and six assists in nine games. All but one of those goals came with Windsor. Shortly afterwards, on January 24, Lemieux scored his 100th OHL goal in a 5–3 win over the Sault Ste. Marie Greyhounds. Between Barrie and Windsor, Lemieux scored 32 goals and 62 points in 45 regular season games. He was suspended for Games 2 and 3 of the Spitfires' opening-round playoff series against the Kitchener Rangers after slew footing Frank Hora, but returned to net a hat-trick in Game 4 to keep Windsor from elimination. The Rangers took the series in the next game, and Lemieux finished his junior ice hockey career with 106 goals, 189 assists, and 295 points in four seasons.

=== Professional ===
==== Winnipeg Jets (2016–2019) ====
Upon the completion of his junior hockey career, Lemieux was called up to join the Manitoba Moose, the Jets' American Hockey League (AHL) affiliate, for the conclusion of their 2015–16 season. He scored two goals and three points in the last five games of the season. Although he hoped to have a chance at making Winnipeg's 2016–17 roster, Lemieux suffered a lower body injury over the summer at the NHL Young Stars Classic and missed all of training camp; on October 11, he was formally assigned to Manitoba so that the Jets could submit their final 23-man roster. In his first full season of professional ice hockey, Lemieux played in 61 games for the Moose, scoring 12 goals and 19 points while accumulating 130 penalty minutes.

After scoring three goals and two assists through the first five games of the 2017–18 AHL season, Lemieux was called up to the NHL for the first time on October 17, 2017, to replace an injured Adam Lowry. He made his debut on October 20, 2017, skating in the Jets' 4–3 victory over the Minnesota Wild. Lemieux recorded his first NHL goal on October 30, scoring on a slapshot during a 7–1 rout of the Pittsburgh Penguins. His first NHL fight came three days later, when he battled Gemel Smith of the Dallas Stars. When it became clear that a fight would break out, Lemieux told reporters, "I decided, well, if I'm gonna fight, I better win." After playing in seven games for Winnipeg, Lemieux was reassigned to the Moose on November 13. Alternating between Winnipeg and Manitoba, Lemieux was more successful in the latter; while his goal against the Penguins was his only point in nine NHL games, he recorded 19 goals and 43 points in 51 AHL games while also posting 170 penalty minutes. He also appeared in eight postseason games during the 2018 Calder Cup playoffs, with three goals, five points, and 22 penalty minutes.

Although he made the Jets' opening night roster for the first time in the 2018–19 season, Lemieux was a healthy scratch for the first two games of the year, blocked from an everyday roster position by Kristian Vesalainen. Lemieux received his first career suspension that November, only 18 games into his NHL tenure, following an illegal check to the head of Florida Panthers skater Vincent Trocheck. He did not score a goal until November 24, his 10th game of the season. Playing primarily on Winnipeg's fourth line alongside Andrew Copp and Mason Appleton, Lemieux recorded only nine goals and two assists in 44 games. He said later that many of his difficulties with the Jets came from the fact that "there just wasn't enough ice to go around", and his development was limited when he was only playing eight minutes per game.

==== New York Rangers (2019–2021) ====
On February 25, 2019, Lemieux was traded to the New York Rangers along with a first-round selection in the 2019 NHL entry draft, and a conditional fourth-round pick in the 2022 draft in exchange for Kevin Hayes. He scored his first goal with his new team in his second game, which the Rangers lost 4–2 to the Montreal Canadiens. He produced his first Gordie Howe hat trick on March 11, with a first-period goal, an assist on Brett Howden's third-period goal, and a fight with Jujhar Khaira during a 3–2 loss to the Edmonton Oilers. Playing in 19 games for the Rangers after his trade, Lemieux added another six points to his season totals. Between Winnipeg and New York, he scored 12 goals and five assists while recording 108 penalty minutes in 63 regular season games.

A restricted free agent after the 2018–19 season, Lemieux agreed to a one-year, $925,000 deal with the Rangers on September 11, 2019. He was the oldest player on the Rangers' third line for the 2019–20 season, which also featured Filip Chytil and Kaapo Kakko, and was protective over his younger linemates, often fighting opponents that would target the 18-year-old Kakko. On December 27, he suffered a fractured hand during a game against the Carolina Hurricanes. He missed a total of nine games with the injury, returning to the lineup for the Rangers' 2–1 loss to the Columbus Blue Jackets on January 20, 2020. The rhythm that Lemieux had found alongside Chytil and Kakko was disrupted by the fracture: in his absence, Brett Howden had filled his position on the third line, and coach David Quinn was reluctant to move him after Lemieux returned. Instead, Lemieux was shuffled around the fourth, third, and even first offensive line. The day before the COVID-19 pandemic forced the NHL to prematurely suspend the 2019–20 season, Lemieux illegally checked Joonas Donskoi of the Colorado Avalanche, who did not return to the game; the NHL said that Lemieux would be suspended for the hit, and that the details of such suspension would be finalized once the league returned to play. When the 2020 Stanley Cup playoffs began, the Department of Player Safety announced that Lemieux would be suspended for the first two games of the qualifying round. The Rangers were swept by the Hurricanes in the best-of-five qualifier, and Lemieux, who had a career-high six goals and 18 points in 59 regular season games, was held scoreless in the one game that he did play.

On November 6, 2020, Lemieux agreed to a two-year, $3.1 million contract extension with the Rangers. He ran into a number of difficulties with the Rangers during the 2020–21 season. First, after taking what Quinn deemed to be a "bad [tripping] penalty" in a game against the New Jersey Devils in January, Quinn took Lemieux out of the lineup in order to "get a look at [Colin] Blackwell". That March, with only four points in 23 appearances and riding a 12-game scoring drought, Lemieux was a leading candidate to be taken out of the lineup once Artemi Panarin returned from personal leave. Continuing his gritty, physical style of play from previous seasons, Lemieux had seven points and 65 penalty minutes in 31 games with the Rangers during the pandemic-shortened season.

==== Los Angeles Kings (2021–2023) ====
The Rangers traded Lemieux to the Los Angeles Kings on March 29, 2021, in exchange for a fourth-round choice in the 2021 NHL entry draft, but he could not begin with his new team until he cleared the COVID-19 protocols that he had entered just before the trade. He cleared protocols on April 5 and joined the team two days later, replacing the slumping Gabriel Vilardi for a 4–3 win over the Arizona Coyotes. In the 18 games that Lemieux played for the Kings at the end of the 2020–21 season, he recorded two goals and four points, as well as 14 penalty minutes.

After returning from another stint in COVID-19 protocols at the beginning of the 2021–22 season, Lemieux became a staple of the Kings' lower offensive lines, his return coinciding with a winning streak for the Kings. On November 27, 2021, Brady Tkachuk of the Ottawa Senators accused Lemieux of twice biting his hand hard enough to draw blood during a scrum. Lemieux was ejected from the game and subsequently received a five-game suspension. Lemieux argued that the tooth marks on Tkachuk's hand were from Tkachuk punching Lemieux in the face, which the Department of Player Safety argued was not supported by video of the incident.

Lemieux and his father Claude became the first father-son duo in NHL history to be suspended for biting.

On July 13, 2022, the Kings re-signed Lemieux to a one-year, $1.35 million contract for the 2022–23 season.

==== Philadelphia Flyers (2023) ====
On March 3, 2023, the Kings traded Brendan Lemieux and a fifth-round pick in the 2024 NHL entry draft to the Philadelphia Flyers in exchange for Zack MacEwen.

==== Carolina Hurricanes (2023–2024) ====
On July 11, 2023, the Hurricanes signed Lemieux as a free agent to a one-year $800,000 contract for the 2023–24 season.

On March 11, 2024, Lemieux signed a one-year, $775,000 extension with the Hurricanes.

Through the first two months of the 2024–25 season, Lemieux did not play in any NHL games and was held pointless in 12 AHL games with the Chicago Wolves, playing his last game with the team on November 20. On December 6, at Lemieux's request, the Hurricanes placed him on unconditional waivers for the purpose of terminating his contract. It was rumoured that, if he cleared waivers, he intended to sign with Swiss club HC Davos.

==== HC Davos (2024–present) ====
On December 9, 2024, Lemieux as a free agent signed a three-year contract with HC Davos.

== International play ==
Medal record

Men's ice hockey

Representing Canada

Ivan Hlinka Memorial Tournament
Gold medal – first place	2015 Czech Republic/Slovakia	

Lemieux was part of the gold medal-winning Canada under-18 team at the 2013 Ivan Hlinka Memorial Tournament in the Czech Republic and Slovakia. He had one goal and one assist in five games, including a goal in the 4–0 shutout victory over the United States team in the tournament finals.

== Playing style ==
Lemieux has referred to his father as his "biggest role model on and off the ice", and has modeled his style of play after Claude, a notorious pest and agitator. He has said that he puts little effort into making comments and motions that irritate his opponents, and that agitation is "the part that comes natural [sic]" to playing hockey. His role as an agitator, in coercing opponents into taking penalties, has proven effective: during the 2019–20 season, Lemieux took seven penalties of his own while drawing 19 from opposing teams. Some sportswriters have criticized Lemieux for focusing solely on developing his aggressive playing style rather than producing offensively: through 109 games with the Rangers, he recorded only 11 goals and 31 points. Lemieux's aggressive style of play has also been criticized by opposing skaters. After Lemieux bit him during a game, Ottawa Senators captain Brady Tkachuk referred to Lemieux as "gutless", saying he was "just a complete brick head".

== Personal life ==
In addition to being the son of Claude Lemieux, Brendan is the nephew of NHL player Jocelyn Lemieux, who was selected by the St. Louis Blues in the 1986 NHL entry draft. Both Brendan and Claude are nicknamed "Pepe", a pun on their surname and on the cartoon character of Pepe Le Pew. In addition to his younger sister Claudia, he has two half-siblings from his father's previous marriage. Although the Lemieux family is of Canadian heritage, Brendan is an American citizen. Brendan holds dual citizenship in the United States and in Canada.

== Career statistics ==
=== Regular season and playoffs ===
			Regular season					Playoffs
Season	Team	League	GP	G	A	Pts	PIM	GP	G	A	Pts	PIM
2012–13	Green Bay Gamblers	USHL	11	1	1	2	34	—	—	—	—	—
2012–13	Barrie Colts	OHL	42	6	8	14	52	21	2	0	2	36
2013–14	Barrie Colts	OHL	65	27	26	53	145	11	7	3	10	16
2014–15	Barrie Colts	OHL	57	41	19	60	145	5	1	2	3	12
2015–16	Barrie Colts	OHL	11	9	5	14	28	—	—	—	—	—
2015–16	Windsor Spitfires	OHL	34	23	25	48	37	3	4	1	5	13
2015–16	Manitoba Moose	AHL	5	2	1	3	6	—	—	—	—	—
2016–17	Manitoba Moose	AHL	61	12	7	19	130	—	—	—	—	—
2017–18	Manitoba Moose	AHL	51	19	24	43	170	8	3	2	5	22
2017–18	Winnipeg Jets	NHL	9	1	0	1	21	—	—	—	—	—
2018–19	Winnipeg Jets	NHL	44	9	2	11	64	—	—	—	—	—
2018–19	New York Rangers	NHL	19	3	3	6	44	—	—	—	—	—
2019–20	New York Rangers	NHL	59	6	12	18	111	1	0	0	0	0
2020–21	New York Rangers	NHL	31	2	5	7	59	—	—	—	—	—
2020–21	Los Angeles Kings	NHL	18	2	2	4	14	—	—	—	—	—
2021–22	Los Angeles Kings	NHL	50	8	5	13	97	7	1	0	1	18
2022–23	Los Angeles Kings	NHL	27	0	3	3	53	—	—	—	—	—
2022–23	Philadelphia Flyers	NHL	18	2	4	6	21	—	—	—	—	—
2023–24	Carolina Hurricanes	NHL	32	3	2	5	64	—	—	—	—	—
2024–25	Chicago Wolves	AHL	12	2	0	2	30	—	—	—	—	—
2024–25	HC Davos	NL	15	0	0	0	10	3	0	1	1	26
2025–26	HC Davos	NL	29	13	8	21	51	11	3	5	8	29
NHL totals			307	36	38	74	548	8	0	1	1	18

=== International ===
Year	Team	Event	Result	GP	G	A	Pts	PIM
2013	Canada	IH18	1st place, gold medalist(s)	5	1	1	2	4
Junior totals				5	1	1	2	4

== Awards and honours ==
Award	Year	Ref
OHL
CHL/NHL Top Prospects Game	2014	
International
Ivan Hlinka Memorial Tournament gold medal	2013	
