= Evander Kane =

Canadian ice hockey player (born 1991)

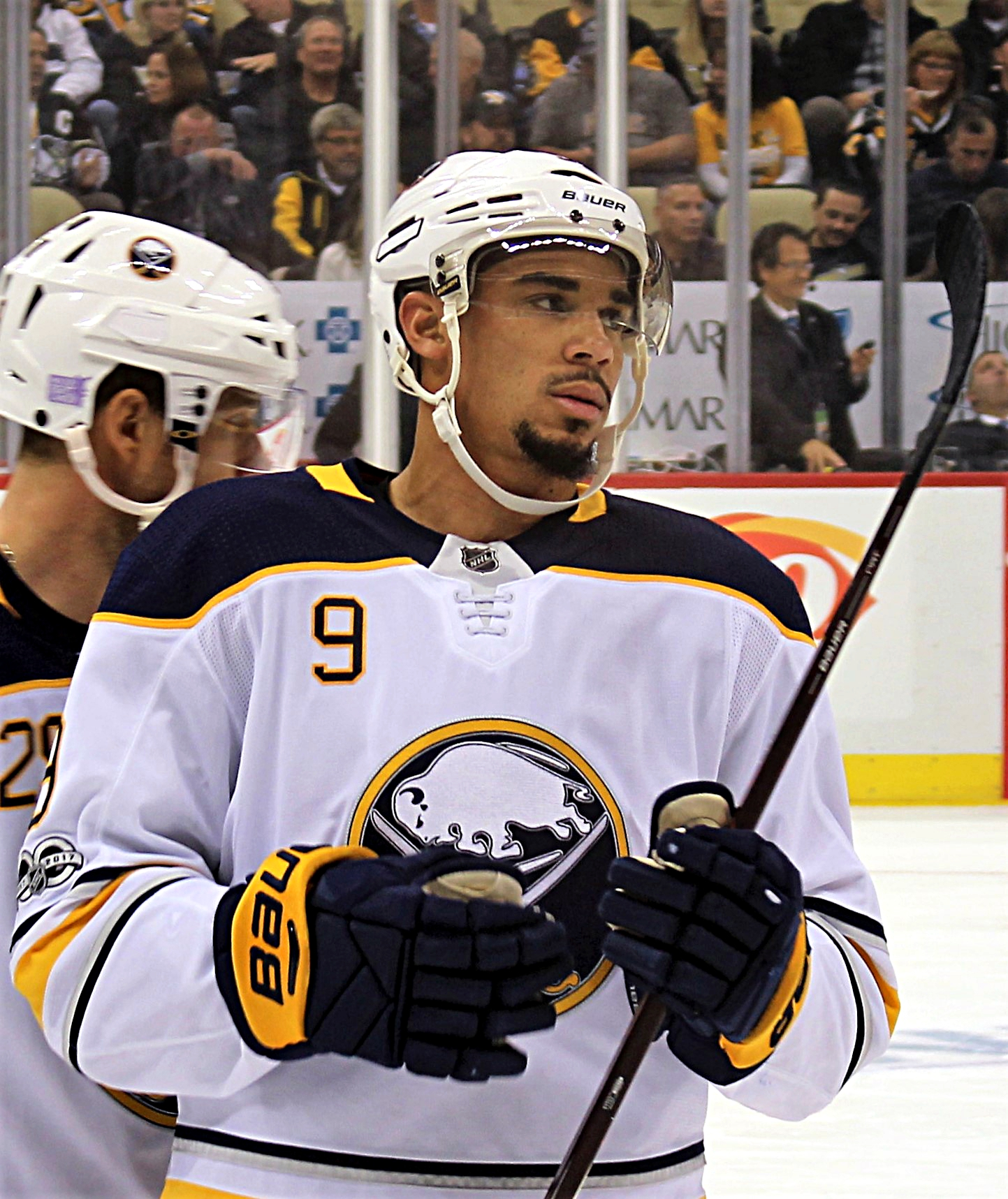
- Kane with the Buffalo Sabres in 2017
- Born: August 2, 1991 (age 35) Vancouver, British Columbia, Canada
- Height: 6 ft 2 in (188 cm)
- Weight: 218 lb (99 kg; 15 st 8 lb)
- Position: Winger
- Shoots: Left
- KHL team Former teams: Sibir Novosibirsk; Atlanta Thrashers; Winnipeg Jets; Dinamo Minsk; Buffalo Sabres; San Jose Sharks; Edmonton Oilers; Vancouver Canucks
- National team: Canada
- NHL draft: 4th overall, 2009; Atlanta Thrashers
- Playing career: 2009–present

Evander Frank Kane (born August 2, 1991) is a Canadian professional ice hockey winger who plays for Sibir Novosibirsk of the Kontinental Hockey League (KHL). He has played for the Atlanta Thrashers, Winnipeg Jets, Buffalo Sabres, San Jose Sharks, Edmonton Oilers, and Vancouver Canucks of the National Hockey League (NHL). Kane was selected fourth overall by the Thrashers in the first round of the 2009 NHL entry draft.

During his major junior career, Kane won the Memorial Cup with the Vancouver Giants of the Western Hockey League (WHL) in 2007, finished as runner-up for the Jim Piggott Memorial Trophy as WHL rookie of the year in 2008 and was named to the WHL West First All-Star Team in 2009. Kane also set the Giants' franchise record for single-season goals in 2008–09. He set career highs in the NHL for both points and goals in 2011–12 as a member of the Jets. He also led the league in penalties in minutes for both the 2018–19 and 2019–20 seasons.

Internationally, Kane received gold medals as a member of Team Canada at the 2008 Ivan Hlinka Memorial Tournament and 2009 World Junior Championships. He has also competed in the 2010, 2011, 2012, and 2014 IIHF World Championships.

Off the ice, he has been involved in several legal disputes including assault, game-betting, and domestic violence claims along with a chapter 7 bankruptcy filing.

== Early life ==
Kane was born on August 2, 1991, in Vancouver, British Columbia, to Perry and Sheri Kane, who named him after American boxer Evander Holyfield (he later met Holyfield at age 18).

Kane comes from an athletic lineage; his father was an amateur boxer and hockey player, while Kane's mother was a college volleyball player. His uncle, Leonard Kane, is a member of the Canadian Ball Hockey Hall of Fame. Kane's cousin, Dwayne Provo, played in the Canadian Football League (CFL) for seven years and spent one season with the New England Patriots of the National Football League (NFL). Another cousin, Kirk Johnson, boxed for Canada at the 1992 Summer Olympics in Barcelona and later fought John Ruiz for the 2002 World Boxing Association (WBA) Heavyweight title.

Growing up in East Vancouver, Kane attended high school at John Oliver Secondary. In addition to hockey, he played baseball, basketball, and soccer growing up. After beginning to skate at the age of three, he began playing minor ice hockey at eight. His father instructed him in his early years and initially wanted to keep him out of organized hockey until Kane was ten. Kane played in the 2003 and 2004 Quebec International Pee-Wee Hockey Tournaments with a team from North Vancouver. At the age of 14, Kane recorded 140 points in 66 games with the bantam North Shore Winter Club, followed by a 22-goal, 54-point campaign to finish fourth in league scoring with the Greater Vancouver Canadians of the BC Hockey Major Midget League (BCMML). Kane also played minor hockey with the Vancouver Giants, prior to bantam and midget.

== Playing career ==
=== Amateur ===
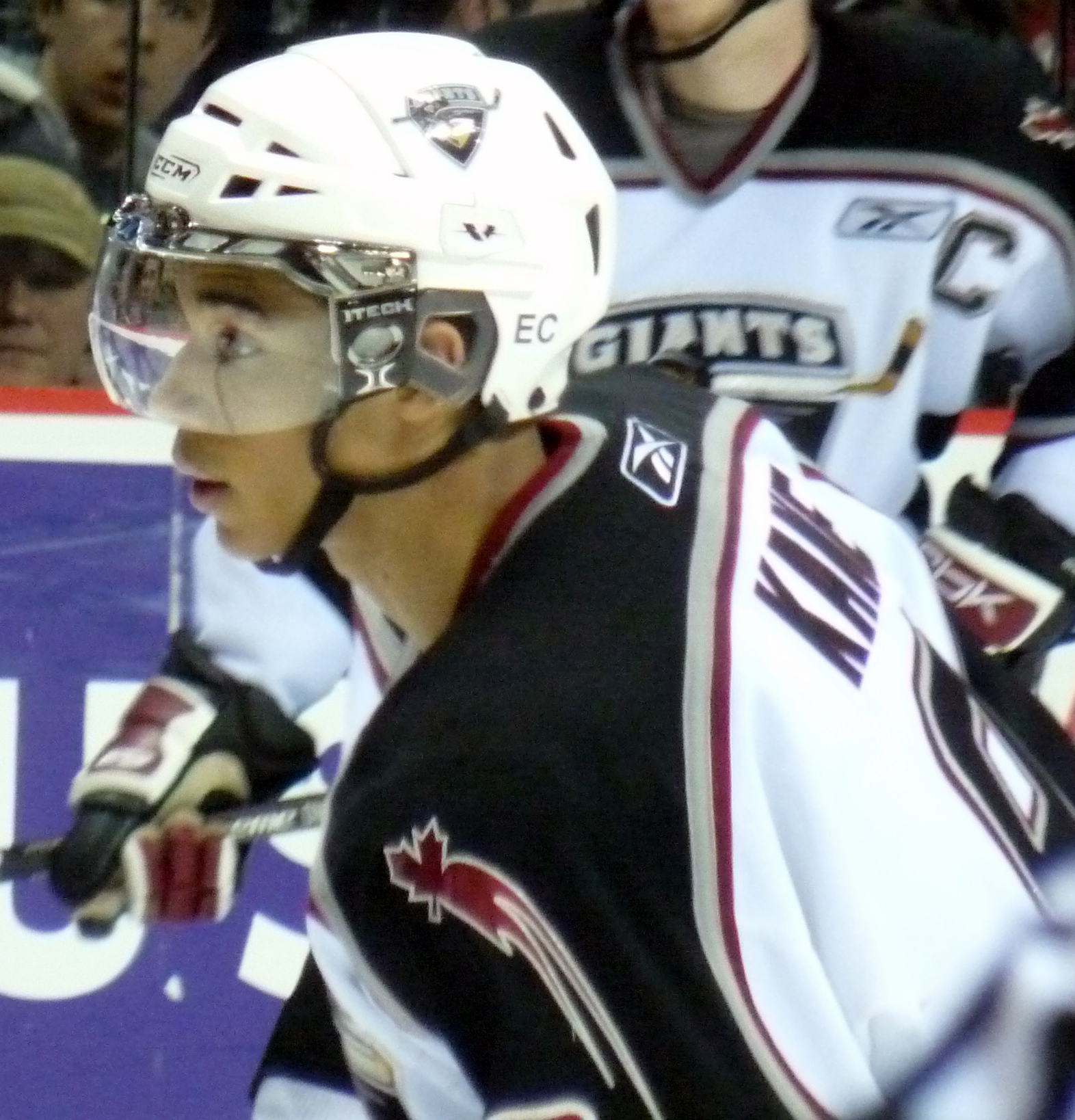
Kane during the 2009 WHL playoffs

Kane was drafted 19th overall in the 2006 WHL bantam draft by the Vancouver Giants. He received his first WHL call-up for a game against the Seattle Thunderbirds on December 13, 2006, due to other Giants players international commitments in the World Junior Championships. Kane scored his first WHL goal, a game-tying marker, on March 25, 2007, the last game of the regular season. He also suited up for five WHL postseason games, being originally called up for the playoffs after Giants forward Tim Kraus was suspended for game three of the opening round. He later appeared in two Memorial Cup games, tallying an assist, as part of the Giants' 2007 Memorial Cup championship.

Set to begin his rookie campaign with the Giants the following season, Kane experienced a minor setback, as he was forced to miss the start of training camp with a case of mononucleosis. He nevertheless recovered and joined the Giants full-time to tally 24 goals – third in team scoring – and 41 points in his first WHL season. Finishing tenth in rookie scoring, he was nominated for the Jim Piggott Memorial Trophy as WHL rookie of the year, which was awarded to Brayden Schenn of the Brandon Wheat Kings.

Kane emerged with an impressive start to the 2008–09 season, registering at least a point in each of his first 22 games. After recording his first WHL hat-trick on October 10, 2008, against the Kelowna Rockets, he was named WHL Player of the Week on October 12, succeeding line-mate Casey Pierro-Zabotel, who had been chosen the previous week. Kane earned a spot as an injury replacement at the 2009 World Junior Championships with Team Canada. Upon returning with a gold medal, Kane was named player of the week for the second time in the season on January 12, 2009, after scoring six points in two games immediately following the World Juniors. Later that month, he participated in the 2009 CHL Top Prospects Game as captain for Team Cherry.

Kane finished his second WHL season with 48 goals and 96 points, fourth in league scoring. He surpassed Adam Courchaine's team record of 43 goals in a single season, set in 2002–03. Second in team scoring to Pierro-Zabotel's 115 points, the line-mates finished one-two in all-time Giants' single-season scoring as Pierro-Zabotel and Kane both surpassed Gilbert Brulé's previous 87-point mark. Kane received WHL West First Team All-Star honors along with teammates Pierro-Zabotel and Jonathon Blum. In the subsequent 2009 playoffs, after the Giants swept the Prince George Cougars in the first round, Kane scored a double-overtime game-winner to force a seventh game in the second round against the Spokane Chiefs. After eliminating the Chiefs in the seventh game, the Giants were then defeated by the Kelowna Rockets in six games in the semifinals. In 17 postseason games, Kane accumulated 15 points.

=== Professional ===
==== Atlanta Thrashers/Winnipeg Jets (2009–2015) ====
Kane was selected fourth overall by the Atlanta Thrashers. Less than a month later, the Thrashers signed Kane to an entry-level contract on July 20, 2009.

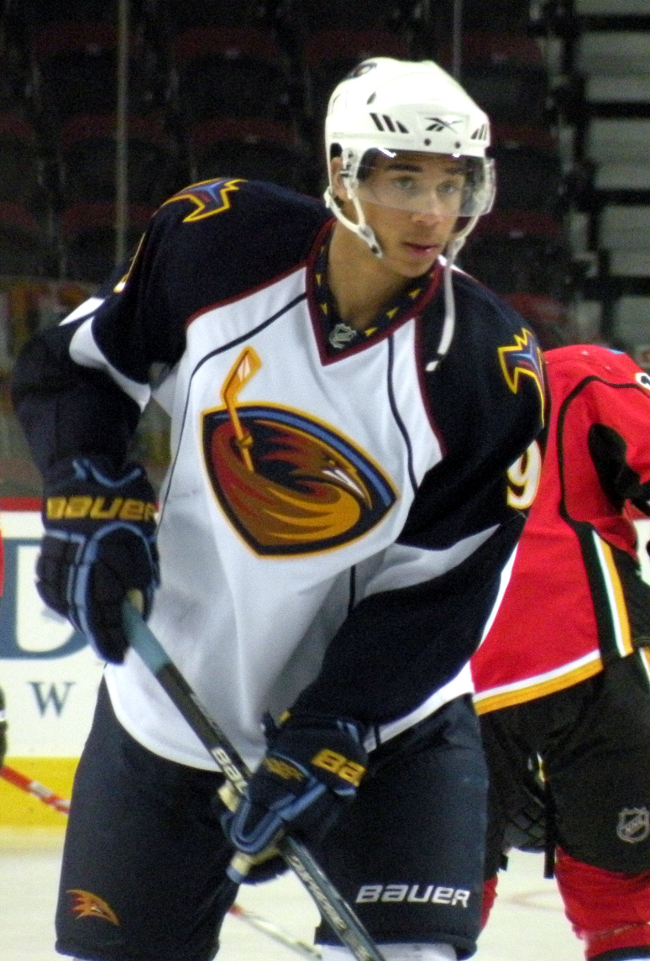
Kane as a member of the Atlanta Thrashers in 2009

Kane made the Thrashers' lineup out of his first NHL training camp for the 2009–10 season. He recorded his first career NHL point in his debut on October 3, 2009, earning an assist on a goal by Rich Peverley against the Tampa Bay Lightning. His first goal was scored five days later, on October 8, beating Chris Mason with a snap shot in a 4–2 win over the St. Louis Blues. He suffered a bone fracture, late in his rookie season, blocking a shot during a game against the Tampa Bay Lightning on March 6, 2010. Kane missed 15 games before returning to the lineup on April 3. Kane finished his NHL rookie campaign with 14 goals and 26 points in 66 games, ranked 12th among first-year point-scorers.

Kane suffered several minor injuries during his second NHL season in 2010–11 season. During a game against the Colorado Avalanche on November 30, 2010, Kane suffered a left knee injury after he was struck by a shot from teammate Tobias Enström; he missed two games. The following month, he missed one game due to an arm injury, sustained during a game against the Pittsburgh Penguins on December 7. In January 2011, he missed an additional six games due to a lower-body injury. Kept from the lineup for a total nine games, Kane increased his points total to 43 with 19 goals and 24 assists. He ranked fifth in team point-scoring – third among forward behind captain Andrew Ladd and Bryan Little.

During the off-season, the Thrashers were bought and relocated by True North Sports and Entertainment, becoming the new Winnipeg Jets. Kane was enjoying a successful first season as a Jet, leading his team in scoring with 18 goals and 31 points by mid-January 2012. During that month, however, he was sidelined with a concussion that was reported on January 21. Later in the season, he recorded a four-point game (two goals and two assists) in a 7–0 win against the Florida Panthers on March 1, 2012. On September 15, Kane signed a six-year, $31.5 million contract extension with the Jets.

As a result of the 2012–13 NHL lockout, Kane joined Dinamo Minsk of the Kontinental Hockey League (KHL). He was the first Canadian NHL player to sign a contract with the KHL. However, after 12 games with the club, in which he recorded one goal, Kane was released. The club's athletic director suggested that Kane "could not adapt to hockey in the KHL", but also said that both sides mutually agreed to end the contract.

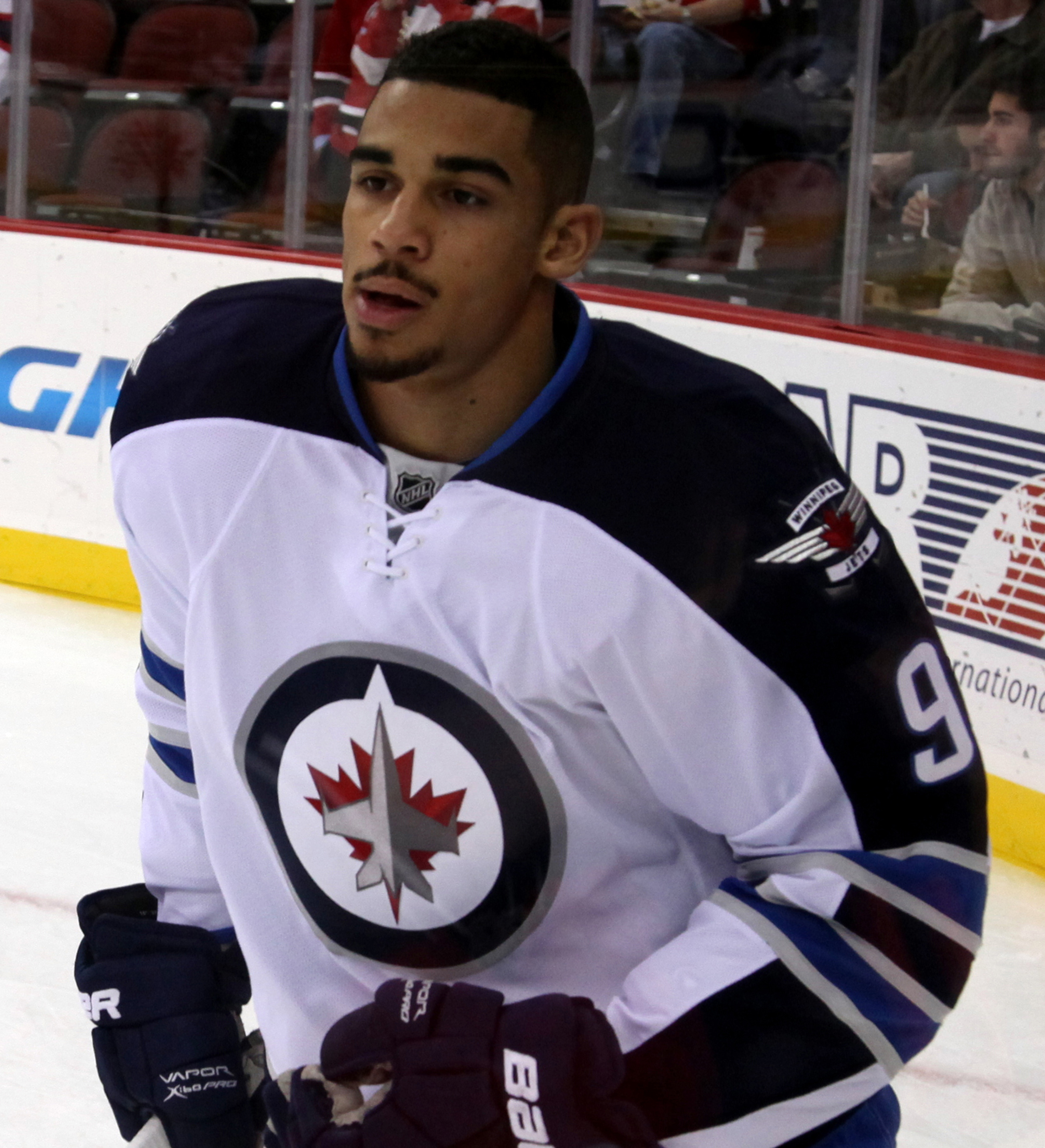
Kane with the Jets in November 2014, his final season with the franchise

On April 3, 2014, Kane was accused of assault, after an incident in Vancouver; he was later sued for financial damages. On April 5, 2014, Kane was a healthy scratch under new head coach Paul Maurice, in a game against the Toronto Maple Leafs. After the game, Maurice said it was a coach's decision, and that if Kane wanted back in the lineup, all he needed to do was "probably just come to the rink." On February 3, 2015, Kane was a healthy scratch against the Vancouver Canucks. It was later determined that he was scratched because of an incident with his teammates. Kane revealed in an October 2015 interview that he felt the Jets did not "have his back" throughout his legal and behavioral issues.

==== Buffalo Sabres (2015–2018) ====
The Jets traded Kane on February 11, 2015, as well as Zach Bogosian and the rights to Jason Kasdorf, to the Buffalo Sabres in exchange for Tyler Myers, Drew Stafford, Joel Armia, Brendan Lemieux, and a conditional first-round pick in the 2015 NHL entry draft (Jack Roslovic). On October 14, 2016, Kane cracked three ribs in the season-opening game when he crashed into boards while fighting for the puck with Alexei Emelin of the Montreal Canadiens, which left him unable to play for weeks. After returning to the lineup on December 1, 2016, Kane scored 28 goals for the Sabres.

==== San Jose Sharks (2018–2022) ====
Amid declining performance and approaching the end of his contract, Sabres management benched him ahead of the 2018 trade deadline. On February 26, 2018, the Sabres traded Kane to the San Jose Sharks in exchange for Danny O'Regan, a conditional first-round or second-round pick in 2019, and a conditional fourth-round pick in 2020. In his Sharks debut, Kane had two assists in a 5–2 win against the Edmonton Oilers. On March 16, 2018, Kane scored his first NHL hat-trick against the Calgary Flames, and then later added a fourth goal, contributing more than half the goals in the Sharks 7–4 win. Kane played 78 games and scored 54 points in his time with Buffalo and San Jose in the 2017–18 season. The 78 games played is the most in a season for Kane. The 54 points was the second-highest season total in Kane's career to that point.

On April 26, 2018, Kane received a one-game suspension for cross-checking Vegas Golden Knights forward Pierre-Édouard Bellemare during game 1 of the Western Conference second round. Through nine playoffs games, Kane recorded four goals and five points. On May 24, 2018, the Sharks re-signed Kane to a seven-year, $49 million contract worth $7 million annually. Kane said that he would like to remain with the Sharks for the rest of his career.

During the 2018–19 season, Kane totaled 56 points (the second-highest point total of his career) and led the NHL in penalty minutes with 153.

During the 2019–20 pre-season, Kane was suspended for the first three games of the regular season due to abusing officials. Two games after returning from his suspension, Kane became the first Sharks player in franchise history to record a first period hat-trick in a 5–2 win over the Carolina Hurricanes. Kane recorded another natural hat-trick later that season when the Sharks visited the Washington Capitals on January 5, 2020, scoring three straight goals in just over 10 minutes during the second period in a 5–4 overtime loss. After an elbowing hit in a game against the Winnipeg Jets on February 14, 2020, Kane was suspended for three games. Kane repeated as league leader in penalty minutes with 122 while registering 26 goals and 47 points, marking his fifth consecutive season with at least 20 goals.

On October 18, 2021, Kane was suspended by the NHL for the opening 21 games of the 2021–22 season for "violation of, and lack of compliance with, the NHL/NHLPA COVID-19 protocols". On November 28, 2021, following the completion of his suspension, the Sharks placed Kane on waivers and was re-assigned to AHL for the first time in his career, joining the San Jose Barracuda the following day.

On January 8, 2022, it was announced that the Sharks had placed Kane on unconditional waivers for the purpose of terminating his contract, due to violation of AHL COVID-19 protocols.

==== Edmonton Oilers (2022–2025) ====
Shortly after news of San Jose's effort to terminate Kane's contract broke, reports began to circulate that the Edmonton Oilers were interested in signing Kane. The Oilers had begun the season strongly, but entered a prolonged slide that had seen them drop out of playoff position by the midpoint, and pressure had built on general manager Ken Holland to take action to improve the team's fortunes. The addition of Kane, a proficient goal-scorer, was seen as a potential answer. On January 27, 2022, Kane signed a one-year contract with the Oilers. The decision to sign Kane generated some controversy, but was defended by Oilers star Connor McDavid. McDavid said "we're a team that is looking to go on a run. If he can come in and add to that any way possible, that's what we’re looking for. He was great in acknowledging that there might be some backlash, but it's a good opportunity for both sides. For him to re-establish himself in the NHL and for us to add a player of his calibre."

Kane made his Oilers debut on January 29, scoring the game's opening goal in a 7–2 victory over the Montreal Canadiens. Through the regular season, Kane played primarily on the team's top line with McDavid and Jesse Puljujärvi. Playing with McDavid helped Kane record the highest shooting percentage of his career, and he was credited with improving the team's even-strength play. He finished the 2021–22 season with 22 goals and 17 assists, while the Oilers finished second in the Pacific Division and qualified for the 2022 Stanley Cup playoffs. Kane was dynamic in the team's first round matchup with the Los Angeles Kings, notably recording his first ever playoff hat-trick in game 3. He finished the series with seven goals, one more than he had scored in all prior playoff games. The Oilers drew the Calgary Flames in the second round, the first playoff "Battle of Alberta" in 31 years. He recorded his second playoff hat-trick, this time a natural one, in six minutes during the second period of game 3 of the second round. Kane attracted controversy in game 3 of the Western Conference finals against the Colorado Avalanche when he cross-checked Avalanche centre Nazem Kadri into the boards, receiving a five-minute major penalty for boarding, and causing Kadri to be ruled out for the remainder of the series due to injury. The NHL suspended Kane for one game as a result.

On July 12, 2022, Kane signed a four-year, $20.5 million contract extension with the Oilers. He notched 5 goals and 8 assists in the first fourteen games of the 2022–23 season, before exiting a November 8 game against the Tampa Bay Lightning after his wrist was cut open by the skate of Tampa forward Patrick Maroon. Kane underwent emergency surgery, and it was subsequently reported that he would miss three to four months of the season. His recovery proceeded better than initially expected, allowing him to return to the lineup for a January 17 game against the Seattle Kraken.

After sitting out the 2024–25 season recovering from surgery, Kane made his return in that year's playoffs in game 2 of the first round against the Kings. He scored 2 goals in that series, while also collecting a point in each subsequent series leading up to the 2025 Stanley Cup Final. Following the team's loss to the Florida Panthers at the end of game 6 of the Stanley Cup Final, Kane did not appear in the traditional handshake lineup with his Oilers teammates, which was met with criticism.

==== Vancouver Canucks (2025–2026) ====
On June 25, 2025, Kane was traded to the hometown Vancouver Canucks in exchange for a fourth-round pick in the 2025 draft.

On March 30, 2026, Kane played his 1,000th NHL game, becoming the 424th player to reach the mark.

==== Sibir Novosibirsk (2026–present) ====
On November 10, 2026, Kane signed a contract with Sibir Novosibirsk for the remainder of the season.

== Personal life ==
Kane and his ex-wife have one daughter. On March 14, 2019, Kane announced that his wife had a miscarriage at 26 weeks. His ex-wife is Anna Kane who, in December 2024, accused Sean Combs of rape.

On June 8, 2020, Kane co-founded the Hockey Diversity Alliance, alongside former player Akim Aliu, to address intolerance and racism in hockey.

== Controversies and legal issues ==
=== Assault and harassment charges ===
On July 1, 2016, Kane was sued by a 21-year-old woman who accused him of assaulting her in the hotel room where he lived. According to court documents, the woman alleged that Kane "met her in a bar, invited her to what he said was a party and then attacked her, causing cuts and bleeding that required multiple surgeries."

On August 1, 2016, Kane pleaded not guilty to one count of criminal trespassing and four counts of non-criminal harassment after confrontations with four separate people at a downtown Buffalo bar in June 2016. At that time, Kane was a member of the Buffalo Sabres. According to a police report, Kane became involved in a fight with a bouncer at a bar called Bottoms Up, after allegedly grabbing an unnamed woman by the throat and attempting to force her into a car outside the nightclub. A second police report alleged that, in a separate incident, Kane grabbed a woman by the arms inside the nightclub and attempted to force her outside. Kane surrendered to Buffalo police in late July 2016. Said Sabres GM Tim Murray of the incident, "Whether he has done these things or not, or he's guilty of these things or not, it's not something I like getting up in the morning and reading about, that's for sure." The incident came after another incident in February, in which Kane was suspended by the team for missing practice after attending the NBA All-Star Game in Toronto. GM Murray noted that Kane's off-ice behaviour has been very negative for both the player and the Sabres' organization. The Bottoms Up case was later adjourned and dismissed. Referred to as an Adjournment in Contemplation of Dismissal, a case can be adjourned for more than six months and after a set period of time, the charges are dismissed if the defendant can display and maintain good behavior.

=== Gambling debts and bankruptcy ===
On November 4, 2019, Kane was sued by The Cosmopolitan casino in Las Vegas after he walked out on a half-million-dollar gambling debt. The suit alleged that Kane had received $500,000 in gambling markers from the casino in April while the Sharks were in Las Vegas for a playoff series against the Vegas Golden Knights. Such markers are essentially lines of credit to allow casino guests to continue gambling, and those extended to Kane were disbursed in eight separate installments, ranging from $20,000 to $100,000. The suit claims that Kane left the casino without making arrangements to settle the debt. The casino sought full restitution plus repayment of legal fees.

On January 11, 2021, Kane reportedly filed for chapter 7 bankruptcy in California after amassing $26.8 million of debt.

=== NHL game betting allegations ===
In July 2021, Kane's estranged wife, in an Instagram post, publicly accused her husband of betting on games involving his own team, and of "throwing games with bookies to win money". The NHL announced that it would investigate the allegation. Kane later published a statement offering his full cooperation and categorically denied his involvement in any hockey-related betting, suggesting that his wife's claims were motivated by distress related to their ongoing divorce process. In a later interview with ESPN's Linda Cohn, he admitted that he did have a gambling addiction that led to large personal debts, for which he had sought professional help. In a January 2021 bankruptcy filing, Evander Kane listed that he owed $1.5 million in gambling debts.

On September 22, 2021, the NHL released its findings into the investigation into the claims and found no evidence of game betting allegations and also stated "To the contrary, the evidence raises doubts about the veracity of the allegations."

=== Domestic violence and sexual assault allegations ===
In September 2021, Kane's ex-wife filed a domestic violence restraining order application including accusations against Kane of sexual assault and domestic battery. Kane's attorney denied the allegations. In August 2021, Kane received a temporary restraining order against his ex-wife, with Kane claiming that she has physically abused him in the past, and sought a permanent restraining order. The NHL announced that it was investigating the domestic violence claims. On October 18, 2021 the NHL ruled that the domestic violence accusations could not be substantiated.

=== Violation of NHL COVID-19 protocols ===
On the same day that Kane was cleared of gambling, the NHL revealed that it was investigating claims that Kane engaged in "inappropriate behavior potentially jeopardizing the health and safety" of his teammates. On October 5, 2021, Front Office Sports reported that the NHL was investigating claims that Kane had submitted a fake COVID-19 vaccine card as proof that he had been vaccinated. This was subsequently corroborated by The Associated Press, The Athletic, and ESPN. On October 18, 2021, the NHL suspended Kane for 21 games over the issue. Following the suspension, Kane was placed on waivers by the Sharks, and was sent down to the San Jose Barracuda of the AHL. After only five games with the Barracuda, Kane tested positive for COVID-19 and entered the AHL COVID-19 protocol. On January 8, 2022, the Sharks placed Kane on unconditional waivers with intent to terminate the contract for violating the AHL protocol as well.

== International play ==
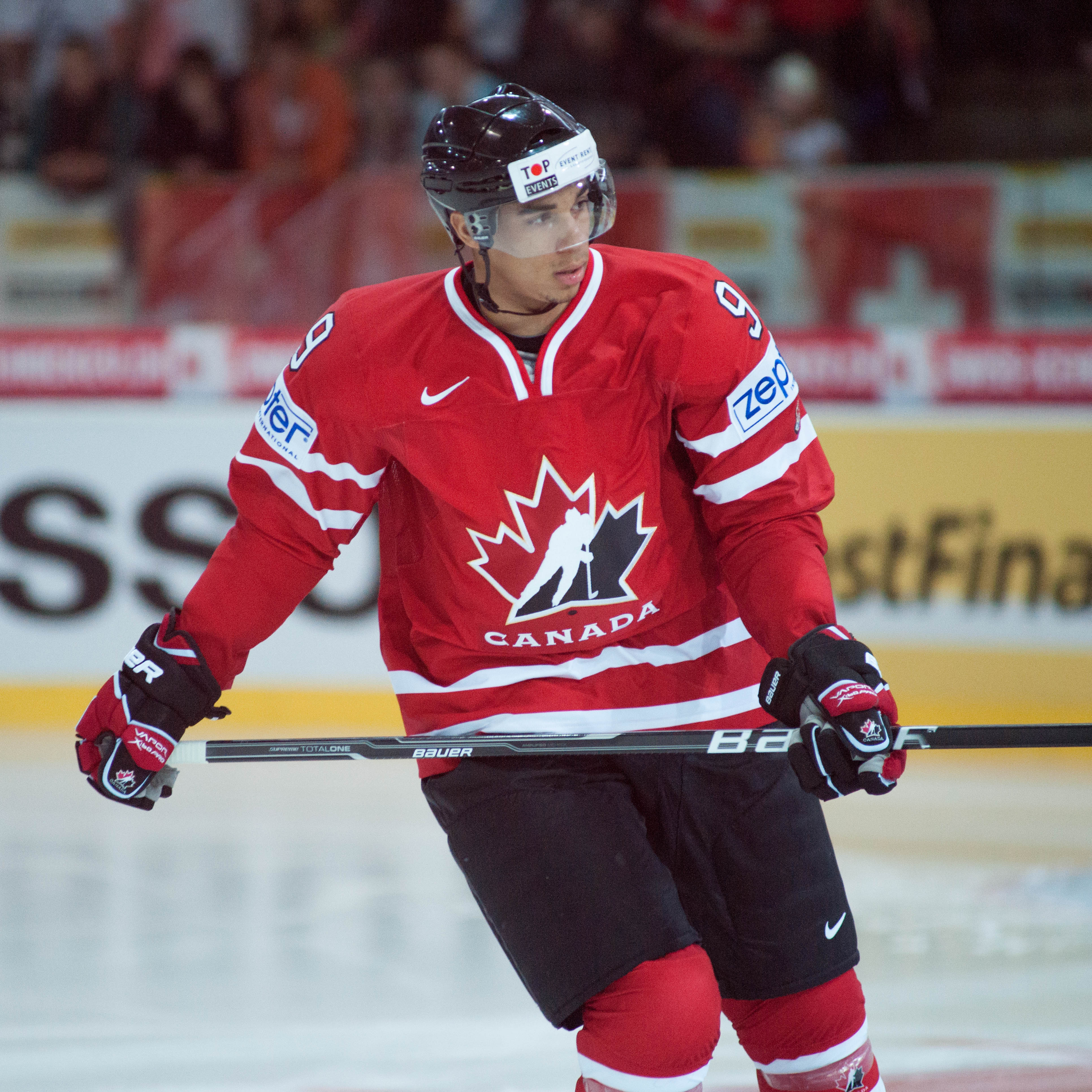
- Kane with the Canada national team in 2012

Medal record

Men's ice hockey

Representing Canada

World Junior Championships
Gold medal – first place	2009 Ottawa	

Ivan Hlinka Memorial Tournament
Gold medal – first place	2008 Pardubice	

Kane competed in the 2008 Ivan Hlinka Memorial Tournament, capturing gold with Canada's under-18 team. He totaled four points in four games, including an assist in the 6–3 gold medal game win against Russia. Later that year, Kane competed on Team Canada during the 2009 World Junior Ice Hockey Championships. As the youngest player on the team, Kane contributed six points in six games, helping Canada to a fifth-straight gold medal with a 5–1 victory over Sweden in the final.

Following his rookie season in the NHL, Kane was named to the Canadian men's team for the 2010 IIHF World Championship in Germany. General manager Mark Messier made a specific effort to assemble a young team; as a result, Kane was one of five teenagers on the roster. He finished the tournament with two goals and two assists in seven games. Canada was eliminated in the quarterfinal by Russia and finished in seventh place.

The following year, Kane returned to the national team for the 2011 IIHF World Championship in Slovakia. Kane recorded two assists over seven games as Canada suffered a second consecutive defeat in the quarterfinal to Russia.

== Career statistics ==
=== Regular season and playoffs ===
Bold indicates led league

			Regular season					Playoffs
Season	Team	League	GP	G	A	Pts	PIM	GP	G	A	Pts	PIM
2005–06	North Shore Winter Club A1	Bantam	66	72	96	168	125	—	—	—	—	—
2006–07	Greater Vancouver Canadians AAA	BCMML	30	22	32	54	150	—	—	—	—	—
2006–07	Vancouver Giants	WHL	8	1	0	1	11	5	0	0	0	0
2007–08	Vancouver Giants	WHL	65	24	17	41	66	10	1	2	3	8
2008–09	Vancouver Giants	WHL	61	48	48	96	89	17	7	8	15	45
2009–10	Atlanta Thrashers	NHL	66	14	12	26	62	—	—	—	—	—
2010–11	Atlanta Thrashers	NHL	72	19	24	43	68	—	—	—	—	—
2011–12	Winnipeg Jets	NHL	74	30	27	57	53	—	—	—	—	—
2012–13	Dinamo Minsk	KHL	12	1	1	2	47	—	—	—	—	—
2012–13	Winnipeg Jets	NHL	48	17	16	33	80	—	—	—	—	—
2013–14	Winnipeg Jets	NHL	63	19	22	41	66	—	—	—	—	—
2014–15	Winnipeg Jets	NHL	37	10	12	22	56	—	—	—	—	—
2015–16	Buffalo Sabres	NHL	65	20	15	35	91	—	—	—	—	—
2016–17	Buffalo Sabres	NHL	70	28	15	43	113	—	—	—	—	—
2017–18	Buffalo Sabres	NHL	61	20	20	40	57	—	—	—	—	—
2017–18	San Jose Sharks	NHL	17	9	5	14	25	9	4	1	5	23
2018–19	San Jose Sharks	NHL	75	30	26	56	**153**	20	2	6	8	61
2019–20	San Jose Sharks	NHL	64	26	21	47	**122**	—	—	—	—	—
2020–21	San Jose Sharks	NHL	56	22	27	49	42	—	—	—	—	—
2021–22	San Jose Barracuda	AHL	5	2	6	8	2	—	—	—	—	—
2021–22	Edmonton Oilers	NHL	43	22	17	39	60	15	**13**	4	17	37
2022–23	Edmonton Oilers	NHL	41	16	12	28	69	12	3	2	5	46
2023–24	Edmonton Oilers	NHL	77	24	20	44	85	20	4	4	8	37
2024–25	Edmonton Oilers	NHL	—	—	—	—	—	21	6	6	12	44
2025–26	Vancouver Canucks	NHL	71	13	18	31	92	—	—	—	—	—
NHL totals			1,001	339	309	648	1,278	97	32	23	55	248

=== International ===
Year	Team	Event	Result	GP	G	A	Pts	PIM
2008	Canada Pacific	U17	4th	6	4	3	7	10
2008	Canada	IH18	1st place, gold medalist(s)	4	1	3	4	6
2009	Canada	WJC	1st place, gold medalist(s)	6	2	4	6	2
2010	Canada	WC	7th	7	2	2	4	6
2011	Canada	WC	5th	7	0	2	2	4
2012	Canada	WC	5th	7	4	4	8	2
Junior totals				16	7	10	17	18
Senior totals				21	6	8	14	12

== Awards and honours ==
Award	Year	Ref
CHL
Memorial Cup champion	2007	
WHL
West First All-Star Team	2009	
San Jose Sharks
Sharks Player of the Year	2021	

== See also ==
- List of black NHL players

Awards and achievements
Preceded by Daultan Leveille	Atlanta Thrashers first-round draft pick 2009	Succeeded by Alexander Burmistrov
