= Lin Bend =

Canadian ice hockey player (1922–1987)

- Born: December 20, 1922 Poplar Point, Manitoba, Canada
- Died: April 6, 1978 (aged 55) Winnipeg, Manitoba, Canada
- Height: 5 ft 10 in (178 cm)
- Weight: 165 lb (75 kg; 11 st 11 lb)
- Position: Centre
- Shot: Left
- Played for: New York Rangers
- Playing career: 1942–1951

John Linthwaite Bend (December 20, 1922 – April 6, 1978) was a Canadian ice hockey centre who played eight games in the National Hockey League with the New York Rangers during the 1942–43 season. The rest of his career, which lasted from 1942 to 1951, was mainly spent in the United States Hockey League. He was born in Poplar Point, Manitoba.

== Career statistics ==
=== Regular season and playoffs ===
			Regular season					Playoffs
Season	Team	League	GP	G	A	Pts	PIM	GP	G	A	Pts	PIM
1939–40	Portage Terriers	MJHL	1	0	0	0	0	—	—	—	—	—
1940–41	Portage Terriers	MJHL	19	16	15	31	10	6	4	2	6	2
1941–42	Portage Terriers	MJHL	17	27	31	58	24	5	9	7	16	8
1941–42	Portage Terriers	M-Cup	—	—	—	—	—	10	13	8	21	7
1942–43	New York Rangers	NHL	8	3	1	4	2	—	—	—	—	—
1942–43	Winnipeg Army Grenades	WNDHL	7	3	1	4	4	—	—	—	—	—
1944–45	Winnipeg Army Grenades	WNDHL	16	16	14	30	17	2	2	0	2	2
1945–46	St. Paul Saints	USHL	56	18	25	43	25	6	2	2	4	4
1946–47	New Haven Ramblers	AHL	64	18	25	43	25	6	2	2	4	4
1947–48	St. Paul Saints	USHL	66	22	27	49	25	—	—	—	—	—
1948–49	St. Paul Saints	USHL	66	29	35	64	20	7	2	3	5	0
1949–50	St. Paul Saints	USHL	70	21	23	44	34	3	1	1	2	2
1950–51	Kansas City Royals	USHL	39	10	11	21	24	—	—	—	—	—
USHL totals			297	100	121	221	128	16	5	6	11	6
NHL totals			8	3	1	4	2	—	—	—	—	—

== Awards and achievements ==
- Turnbull Cup (MJHL) Championship (1942)
- Memorial Cup Championship (1942)
- MJHL First All-Star Team (1942)
- MJHL Scoring Champion (1942)
- Paul W. Loudon (USHL) Championship (1949)
- Honoured Member of the Manitoba Hockey Hall of Fame
