= 2014 Western Canada Cup =

Ice hockey tournament

The 2014 Western Canada Cup was played at Credit Union Place in Dauphin, Manitoba from April 26 to May 4, 2014. The Yorkton Terriers and host Dauphin Kings finished first and second, respectively, to each earn a berth in the 2014 Royal Bank Cup.

== Round robin ==
WCC Round Robin
Rank	Team	League	W-L-OTL	GF	GA
1	Dauphin Kings	Host	3-1-0	19	16
2	Yorkton Terriers	SJHL	2-1-1	15	13
3	Spruce Grove Saints	AJHL	2-2-0	11	12
4	Coquitlam Express	BCHL	2-2-0	9	11
5	Winnipeg Blues	MJHL	1-2-1	10	12

Tie Breaker: Head-to-Head, then 3-way +/-.

=== Results ===
Round Robin results
Game	Away Team	Score	Home Team	Score	Notes
1	Yorkton	1	Winnipeg	3	Final
2	Spruce Grove	2	Dauphin	4	Final
3	Coquitlam	3	Spruce Grove	1	Final
4	Dauphin	6	Yorkton	8	Final
5	Winnipeg	1	Coquitlam	2	Final
6	Yorkton	2	Spruce Grove	3	OT Final
7	Winnipeg	3	Dauphin	4	OT Final
8	Coquitlam	1	Yorkton	4	Final
9	Spruce Grove	5	Winnipeg	3	Final
10	Dauphin	5	Coquitlam	3	Final

Schedule and results can be found on the official website.

== Semi and Finals ==
Championship Round
Game	Away Team	Score	Home Team	Score	Notes
Semi-final	Coquitlam	3	Spruce Grove	5	Final
Final	Yorkton	5	Dauphin	4	Final
Runner-Up	Spruce Grove	3	Dauphin	4	Final

== See also ==
- Western Canada Cup
- 2014 Royal Bank Cup
