= 1973 Centennial Cup =

Canadian Ice hockey tournament

1973 Manitoba Centennial Cup
Tournament details
- Venue(s): Brandon, Manitoba; Winnipeg, Manitoba
- Dates: May 1973
- Teams: 2

Final positions
- Champions: Portage Terriers (1st title)
- Runners-up: Pembroke Lumber Kings

Tournament statistics
- Games played: 5

The 1973 Centennial Cup is the third Tier II Junior "A" 1973 ice hockey National Championship for the Canadian Junior A Hockey League.

The Centennial Cup was competed for by the winners of the Western Canadian Champions and the Eastern Canadian Champions.

The finals were hosted by the Portage la Prairie Terriers in the city of Brandon, Manitoba and Winnipeg Arena.

== The Playoffs ==
Regionals
Sask	Humboldt Broncos	1
Man	Portage Terriers	4
Western Canada
BC	Penticton Broncos	4
Alta	Calgary Canucks	1
Ont	Pembroke L. Kings	4
Ont	Chatham Maroons	3
Eastern Canada
PQ	St. Jerome Alouettes	4
NB	Moncton Hawks	1

Semi-finals
Man	Portage Terriers	4
BC	Penticton Broncos	3
Ont	Pembroke L. Kings	4
PQ	St. Jerome Alouettes	1

Finals
Ont	Pembroke Lumber Kings	1
Man	Portage Terriers	4

Prior to Regionals

Chatham Maroons (SOJHL) defeated Wexford Raiders (OPJHL) 4-games-to-3
Moncton Hawks (NBJHL) defeated Buchans Miners (NLJHL) 4-games-to-none
Pembroke Lumber Kings (CJHL) defeated St. Paul Vulcans (CAJHL) 4-games-to-1

=== MCC Finals ===
Centennial Cup Results
Game	Team	Score	Team	Score
1	Portage la Prairie Terriers	6	Pembroke Lumber Kings	5 OT
2	Portage la Prairie Terriers	4	Pembroke Lumber Kings	2
3	Portage la Prairie Terriers	3	Pembroke Lumber Kings	1
4	Portage la Prairie Terriers	4	Pembroke Lumber Kings	6
5	Portage la Prairie Terriers	4	Pembroke Lumber Kings	2

== Regional Championships ==
Manitoba Centennial Cup: Portage la Prairie Terriers

Abbott Cup: Portage la Prairie Terriers
Eastern Champions: Pembroke Lumber Kings

Doyle Cup: Penticton Broncos
Anavet Cup: Portage la Prairie Terriers
Dudley Hewitt Cup: Chatham Maroons
Callaghan Cup: Pembroke Lumber Kings

== Roll of League Champions ==
AJHL: Calgary Canucks
BCJHL: Penticton Broncos
CAJHL: St. Paul Vulcans
CJHL: Pembroke Lumber Kings
MJHL: Portage Terriers
NBJHL: Moncton Hawks
NJAHL: Buchans Miners
OPJHL: Wexford Raiders
QJAHL: St. Jerome Alouettes
SJHL: Humboldt Broncos
SOJAHL: Chatham Maroons

== See also ==
- Canadian Junior A Hockey League
- Royal Bank Cup
- Anavet Cup
- Doyle Cup
- Dudley Hewitt Cup
- Fred Page Cup
- Abbott Cup
- Mowat Cup
