= Ed Belfour Top Goaltender Trophy =

MJHL Top Goaltender Award 84

The Ed Belfour Top Goaltender Trophy is presented annually to the Manitoba Junior Hockey League's goaltender judged to be the best at his position during the regular season. The trophy was formerly called the MJHL Top Goaltender Award and was renamed in 2018 after former MJHL goaltender and Hockey Hall of Fame inductee Ed Belfour.

== Award winners ==
Season	Winner	Team
2015	Nick Deery	Steinbach Pistons
2014	Braeden Ostepchuk	Selkirk Steelers
2013	Adam Iwan	Portage Terriers
2012	Jayson Argue	Swan Valley Stampeders
2011	Matthew Krahn	OCN Blizzard
2010	David Aime	OCN Blizzard
2009	Alan Armour	Selkirk Steelers
2008	Gavin McHale	Portage Terriers
2007	Brant Hilton	Winnipeg South Blues
2006	Justin Harris	Selkirk Steelers
2005	Brett Koscielny	Dauphin Kings
2004	Greg Goodwin	Neepawa Natives
1998	Eric Pateman	Winkler Flyers
1997	Eric Pateman	Winkler Flyers
1996	Duane Hoey	Winnipeg Saints
1994	Ryan Tempel	St. Boniface Saints
1992	Robin Cook	Winkler Flyers
1990	Robin Cook	Winkler Flyers
1986	Ed Belfour	Winkler Flyers
1977	Jim Tkachyk	Dauphin Kings
1974	Andy Stoesz	Selkirk Steelers
1973	Murray Bannerman	St. James Canadians
1973	John Memryk	Portage Terriers
1968	Alan Hanna	Winnipeg Monarchs
1967	Chris Worthy	Flin Flon Bombers
1966	George Surmay	Winnipeg Rangers
1965	Wayne Stephenson	Winnipeg Braves
1964	Ken Kachulak	Brandon Wheat Kings
1963	Ken Kachulak	Brandon Wheat Kings
1962	Gary McAlpine	Brandon Wheat Kings
1961	Ernie Wakely	Winnipeg Braves
1960	Don Holmes	Brandon Wheat Kings
1959	Paul Sexsmith	St. Boniface Canadiens
1955	Ted Derrett	Winnipeg Monarchs
1954	Don Dawson	St. Boniface Canadiens
