= Portage Terriers =

Manitoba ice hockey team

- City: Portage la Prairie, Manitoba
- League: Manitoba Junior Hockey League
- Division: East
- Founded: 1932
- Home arena: Stride Place (capacity: 1,975)
- Colours: Green, black, white
- General manager: Blake Spiller
- Head coach: Blake Spiller
- Media: CFRY Radio; PortageOnline.com; Portage Daily Graphic

Championships
- Playoff championships: 1942 Memorial Cup Champions; 1973 Centennial Cup Champions; 2015 Royal Bank Cup Champions

The Portage Terriers are a Canadian junior "A" ice hockey team from Portage la Prairie, Manitoba, Canada. They are members of the Manitoba Junior Hockey League, a part of the Canadian Junior Hockey League.

== History ==
The Portage Terriers were founded in 1932. Ten years later the Terriers won the Turnbull Cup as Manitoba junior champions and went on to defeat the Oshawa Generals to win the Memorial Cup. Their roster included Joe Bell, Gordon Bell, Billy Gooden, Lin Bend, Jack MacDonald, Wally Stefaniw, Bobby Love, Oliver "Bud" Ritchie, Bill Heindl Sr., Jack O'Reilly, Joe Ledoux, Lloyd Smith and Don Campbell.

A shortage of players following World War II forced the Terriers to cease operations in 1947. The Portage Terriers would be reborn twenty years later as members of the new Central Manitoba Junior Hockey League. The CMJHL lasted only one season before it merged with the MJHL. The Terriers became a Junior 'A' club following the reorganization of Canadian junior hockey in 1970. In 1972-73, the Terriers won the ANAVET Cup as Manitoba-Saskatchewan champions and Abbott Cup as Western Canadian champions, and then defeated the Pembroke Lumber Kings to win the 1973 Centennial Cup.

The team endured some tough years following their Centennial Cup appearance and it was not until 1989 that the Terriers would recapture the league title. Since the mid-2000s, the Terriers have been the MJHL's most dominant franchise, winning nine Turnbull Cups, three ANAVET Cups, and one national championship (2015).

During the 2014-15 season, the Terriers set a new league record by posting a winning percentage of .917 during the regular season, after which they went undefeated through the playoffs to capture the Turnbull Cup. The Terriers finished second at the Western Canada Cup and then moved on to host the 2015 Royal Bank Cup in Portage la Prairie, where they captured the national title with a victory over the Carleton Place Canadians in the championship game. The 2020 national championship, rechristened as the Centennial Cup, was also to be played in Portage la Prairie but cancelled because of the coronavirus pandemic.

The Terriers have played at Stride Place, originally named the Portage Credit Union Centre, since 2010. Prior to this, the Terriers played at the Portage Centennial Arena. The team's head coach and general manager is Blake Spiller, who has held the position since 2006. Spiller is the winningest coach in the team's history.

The 1942 and 1972-73 Portage Terriers have been inducted into the Manitoba Hockey Hall of Fame under the team category.

== List of championships ==
Championship	Years won
Turnbull Cup	1942, 1973, 1990, 2005, 2008, 2009, 2011, 2012, 2015, 2016, 2017, 2019
Abbott Cup	1942, 1973
Memorial Cup	1942
ANAVET Cup	1973, 2005, 2011, 2019
Royal Bank/Centennial Cup	1973, 2015

== Season-by-season record ==
Note: GP = Games Played, W = Wins, L = Losses, T = Ties, OTL = Overtime Losses, GF = Goals for, GA = Goals against

Season	GP	W	L	T	OTL	GF	GA	Points	Finish	Playoffs
1967-68	23	6	17	0	-	72	147	12	4th CMJHL	
1968-69	34	3	28	3	-	104	236	9	8th MJHL	
1969-70	34	12	20	2	-	127	156	26	6th MJHL	
1970-71	48	27	15	6	-	163	158	60	2nd MJHL	
1971-72	48	33	14	1	-	266	193	67	2nd MJHL	
1972-73	48	32	16	0	-	280	187	62	1st MJHL	Won League, won AC, won AbC, won MCC
1973-74	48	29	18	1	-	255	201	59	4th MJHL	
1974-75	48	25	22	1	-	223	209	51	4th MJHL	
1975-76	52	25	27	0	-	236	245	50	7th MJHL	
1976-77	52	17	35	0	-	214	287	34	10th MJHL	
1977-78	52	18	33	1	-	244	335	37	8th MJHL	
1978-79	48	26	22	0	-	267	289	52	4th MJHL	
1979-80	44	5	37	2	-	186	399	12	9th MJHL	
1980-81	48	20	27	1	-	240	271	41	5th MJHL	
1981-82	48	15	32	1	-	215	288	31	7th MJHL	
1982-83	48	23	24	1	-	259	254	47	6th MJHL	
1983-84	48	10	38	0	-	156	371	20	8th MJHL	
1984-85	48	6	42	0	-	184	370	12	9th MJHL	
1985-86	48	12	35	1	-	209	326	25	9th MJHL	
1986-87	47	27	20	0	-	299	245	54	5th MJHL	
1987-88	48	27	21	0	-	293	278	54	4th MJHL	
1988-89	48	28	19	1	-	276	232	57	4th MJHL	
1989-90	52	43	9	0	-	352	194	86	1st MJHL	Won League
1990-91	48	23	25	0	-	268	267	46	5th MJHL	
1991-92	48	29	18	0	1	310	203	59	4th MJHL	
1992-93	48	34	12	2	0	282	188	70	1st MJHL	
1993-94	56	31	24	1	0	--	--	63	4th MJHL	
1994-95	56	24	27	1	4	218	249	53	6th MJHL	
1995-96	56	34	20	1	1	255	196	70	3rd MJHL	Lost quarter-final
1996-97	56	31	22	2	1	243	200	65	3rd MJHL	Lost quarter-final
1997-98	62	39	17	5	1	271	204	84	3rd MJHL	
1998-99	62	42	16	2	2	310	214	88	2nd MJHL	
1999-00	64	34	23	-	7	291	254	75	5th MJHL	
2000-01	64	36	23	-	5	226	210	77	4th MJHL	
2001-02	64	43	19	-	2	275	169	88	3rd MJHL	
2002-03	64	44	12	-	8	331	181	96	2nd MJHL	
2003-04	64	32	26	-	6	232	230	70	6th MJHL	Lost final
2004-05	63	39	18	-	6	237	191	84	1st MJHL	Won League, won AC
2005-06	63	23	30	-	10	196	218	56	8th MJHL	Lost quarter-final
2006-07	62	34	20	-	8	271	231	76	5th MJHL	Lost quarter-final
2007-08	62	42	15	-	5	278	188	89	3rd MJHL	Won League
2008-09	62	46	13	-	3	287	175	95	2nd MJHL	Won League
2009-10	62	35	17	-	10	223	173	80	2nd MJHL	Lost quarter-final
2010-11	62	40	15	-	7	227	164	87	1st MJHL	Won League, won AC
2011-12	62	42	15	-	5	266	189	89	1st MJHL	Won League
2012-13	60	32	27	-	1	188	188	65	6th MJHL	Lost quarter-final
2013-14	60	36	16	-	8	206	155	80	4th MJHL	Lost quarter-final
2014-15	60	53	3	-	4	285	120	110	1st MJHL	Won League, Won RBC
2015-16	60	52	6	-	2	276	123	106	1st MJHL	Won League
2016-17	60	37	19	-	4	256	198	78	5th MJHL	Won League
2017-18	60	38	16	-	6	251	163	78	3rd MJHL	Lost quarter-final
2018-19	60	46	11	-	3	277	150	95	1st MJHL	Won League, won AC
2019-20	60	44	14	-	2	240	145	90	2nd MJHL	Cancelled
2020-21	8	4	3	-	1	25	25	9	5th MJHL	Cancelled
2021-22	54	23	24	-	7	169	186	53	8th MJHL	DNQ
2022-23	58	43	11	-	4	181	206	86	1st MJHL	Lost-Semi-final
2023–24	58	36	14	-	4	213	156	80	3rd MJHL	Lost quarter-final
2024–25	58	40	17	-	1	197	152	81	3rd of 7 East Div; 3rd of 13 MJHL	Won Div Semifinal 4-3 (Steinbach Pistons); Lost League Semifinals 2-4 (Dauphin Kings)

=== Playoffs ===
- 1971 Lost quarter-final

Selkirk Steelers defeated Portage Terriers 4-games-to-2

- 1972 Lost semi-final

Portage Terriers defeated Kenora Muskies 4-games-to-1
Dauphin Kings defeated Portage Terriers 4-games-to-none

- 1973 Won League, won Man/Sask Championship, won Abbott Cup, won 1973 Centennial Cup

Portage Terriers defeated Kenora Muskies 4-games-to-none
Portage Terriers defeated St. James Canadians 4-games-to-none MJHL CHAMPIONS
Portage Terriers defeated Humboldt Broncos (SJHL) 3-games-to-2 and a default MAN/SASK CHAMPIONS
Portage Terriers defeated Penticton Broncos (BCJHL) 4-games-to-3 ABBOTT CUP CHAMPIONS
Portage Terriers defeated Pembroke Lumber Kings (CJHL) 4-games-to-1 CENTENNIAL CUP CHAMPIONS

- 1974 Lost semi-final

Portage Terriers defeated Brandon Travellers 4-games-to-2
Selkirk Steelers defeated Portage Terriers 4-games-to-3

- 1975 Lost semi-final

Portage Terriers defeated Dauphin Kings 4-games-to-none
Selkirk Steelers defeated Portage Terriers 4-games-to-1

- 1976 Lost quarter-final

Brandon Travellers defeated Portage Terriers 4-games-to-1

- 1977 DNQ
- 1978 Lost quarter-final

Selkirk Steelers defeated Portage Terriers 4-games-to-none

- 1979 Lost semi-final

Portage Terriers defeated Dauphin Kings 4-games-to-3
Selkirk Steelers defeated Portage Terriers 4-games-to-none

- 1980 DNQ
- 1981 Lost quarter-final

Dauphin Kings defeated Portage Terriers 4-games-to-none

- 1982 Lost quarter-final

Selkirk Steelers defeated Portage Terriers 4-games-to-none

- 1983 Lost quarter-final

Dauphin Kings defeated Portage Terriers 4-games-to-none

- 1984 Lost quarter-final

Dauphin Kings defeated Portage Terriers 4-games-to-none

- 1985 DNQ
- 1986 DNQ
- 1987 Lost quarter-final

Dauphin Kings defeated Portage Terriers 4-games-to-1

- 1988 Lost final

Portage Terriers defeated Selkirk Steelers 4-games-to-1
Portage Terriers defeated Dauphin Kings 4-games-to-1
Winnipeg South Blues defeated Portage Terriers 4-games-to-none

- 1989 Lost quarter-final

Selkirk Steelers defeated Portage Terriers 4-games-to-3

- 1990 Won League, lost Anavet Cup

Portage Terriers defeated Winkler Flyers 4-games-to-1
Portage Terriers defeated Dauphin Kings 4-games-to-1
Portage Terriers defeated Kildonan North Stars 4-games-to-none MJHL CHAMPIONS
Nipawin Hawks (SJHL) defeated Portage Terriers 4-games-to-2

- 1991 Lost quarter-final

Winkler Flyers defeated Portage Terriers 4-games-to-1

- 1992 Lost semi-final

Portage Terriers defeated Dauphin Kings 4-games-to-1
Winkler Flyers defeated Portage Terriers 4-games-to-1

- 1993 Lost semi-final

Portage Terriers defeated Neepawa Natives 4-games-to-none
Dauphin Kings defeated Portage Terriers 4-games-to-1

- 1994 Lost quarter-final

Winkler Flyers defeated Portage Terriers 4-games-to-1

- 1995 Lost quarter-final

Neepawa Natives defeated Portage Terriers 4-games-to-none

- 1996 Lost quarter-final

Neepawa Natives defeated Portage Terriers 4-games-to-3

- 1997 Lost quarter-final

OCN Blizzard defeated Portage Terriers 4-games-to-1

- 1998 Lost quarter-final

OCN Blizzard defeated Portage Terriers 4-games-to-2

- 1999 Lost quarter-final

Winkler Flyers defeated Portage Terriers 4-games-to-2

- 2000 Lost quarter-final

Dauphin Kings defeated Portage Terriers 4-games-to-none

- 2001 Lost quarter-final

Neepawa Natives defeated Portage Terriers 4-games-to-3

- 2002 Lost semi-final

Portage Terriers defeated Neepawa Natives 4-games-to-1
OCN Blizzard defeated Portage Terriers 4-games-to-3

- 2003 Lost semi-final

Portage Terriers defeated Swan Valley Stampeders 4-games-to-3
OCN Blizzard defeated Portage Terriers 4-games-to-1

- 2004 Lost final

Portage Terriers defeated OCN Blizzard 4-games-to-none
Portage Terriers defeated Swan Valley Stampeders 4-games-to-2
Selkirk Steelers defeated Portage Terriers 4-games-to-none

- 2005 Won League, won Anavet Cup, lost in 2005 Royal Bank Cup round robin

Portage Terriers defeated OCN Blizzard 4-games-to-2
Portage Terriers defeated Neepawa Natives 4-games-to-1
Portage Terriers defeated Selkirk Steelers 4-games-to-2 MJHL CHAMPIONS
Portage Terriers defeated Yorkton Terriers (SJHL) 4-games-to-2 ANAVET CUP CHAMPIONS
Fifth and eliminated in 2005 Royal Bank Cup round robin (1-3)

- 2006 Lost quarter-final

Dauphin Kings defeated Portage Terriers 4-games-to-2

- 2007 Lost quarter-final

Neepawa Natives defeated Portage Terriers 4-games-to-3

- 2008 Won League, lost Anavet Cup

Portage Terriers defeated Swan Valley Stampeders 4-games-to-3
Portage Terriers defeated Dauphin Kings 4-games-to-none
Portage Terriers defeated Winnipeg Saints 4-games-to-1 MJHL CHAMPIONS
Humboldt Broncos defeated Portage Terriers 4-games-to-none

- 2009 Won League, lost Anavet Cup

Portage Terriers defeated Waywayseecappo Wolverines 4-games-to-none
Portage Terriers defeated Dauphin Kings 4-games-to-none
Portage Terriers defeated Selkirk Steelers 4-games-to-1 MJHL CHAMPIONS
Humboldt Broncos defeated Portage Terriers 4-games-to-3

- 2010 Lost quarter-final

Swan Valley Stampeders defeated Portage Terriers 4-games-to-1

- 2011 Won League, won Anavet Cup, lost in 2011 Royal Bank Cup round robin

Portage Terriers defeated Swan Valley Stampeders 4-games-to-2
Portage Terriers defeated Dauphin Kings 4-games-to-2
Portage Terriers defeated Selkirk Steelers 4-games-to-1 MJHL CHAMPIONS
Portage Terriers defeated La Ronge Ice Wolves 4-games-to-3 ANAVET CUP CHAMPIONS
Fifth and eliminated from 2011 Royal Bank Cup round robin (1-3)

- 2012 Won League, lost in 2012 Royal Bank Cup round robin

Portage Terriers defeated Selkirk Steelers 4-games-to-0
Portage Terriers defeated Winnipeg Blues 4-games-to-2
Portage Terriers defeated Winnipeg Saints 4-games-to-1 MJHL CHAMPIONS
Humboldt Broncos defeated Portage Terriers 4-games-to-3
Fifth and eliminated from 2012 Royal Bank Cup round robin (1-3)

- 2013 Lost quarter-final

Steinbach Pistons defeated Portage Terriers 4-games-to-3

- 2014 Lost quarter-final

Steinbach Pistons defeated Portage Terriers 4-games-to-3

- 2015 Won League, WCC Runner-up, Won Royal Bank Cup

Portage Terriers defeated Waywayseecappo Wolverines 4-games-to-none
Portage Terriers defeated Virden Oil Capitals 4-games-to-none
Portage Terriers defeated Steinbach Pistons 4-games-to-none MJHL CHAMPIONS
Second in the 2015 Western Canada Cup round robin (3-1)
Penticton Vees defeated Portage Terriers 4-3 in WCC final
Portage Terriers defeated Melfort Mustangs 4-2 in WCC runner-up game
First in the 2015 Royal Bank Cup round robin (3-1)
Portage Terriers defeated Melfort Mustangs 6-1 in semi-final
Portage Terriers defeated Carleton Place Canadians 5-2 in final ROYAL BANK CUP CHAMPIONS

- 2016 Won League, lost in WCC runner-up game

Portage Terriers defeated Selkirk Steelers 4-games-to-none
Portage Terriers defeated Winnipeg Blues 4-games-to-none
Portage Terriers defeated Steinbach Pistons 4-games-to-1 MJHL CHAMPIONS
Fourth in the 2016 Western Canada Cup round robin (2-1-1)
Melfort Mustangs defeated Portage Terriers 3-2 in runner-up game

- 2017 Won League, lost in WCC round robin

Portage Terriers defeated Selkirk Steelers 4-games-to-2
Portage Terriers defeated Steinbach Pistons 4-games-to-2
Portage Terriers defeated OCN Blizzard 4-games-to-2 MJHL CHAMPIONS
Fifth and eliminated from 2017 Western Canada Cup round robin (1-3)

- 2018 Lost quarter-final

Winnipeg Blues defeated Portage Terriers 4-games-to-2

- 2019 Won League, won Anavet Cup, lost in 2019 National Junior A Championship round robin

Portage Terriers defeated Waywayseecappo Wolverines 4-games-to-0
Portage Terriers defeated Virden Oil Capitals 4-games-to-0
Portage Terriers defeated Swan Valley Stampeders 4-games-to-3 MJHL CHAMPIONS
Portage Terriers defeated Battlefords North Stars 4-games-to-1 ANAVET CUP CHAMPIONS
Fifth and eliminated from 2019 National Junior A Championship round robin (0-4)

- 2020 Playoffs cancelled

Portage Terriers leading Dauphin Kings 2-games-to-1 when playoffs were cancelled due to COVID-19 pandemic

- 2021 Playoffs cancelled
- 2022 DNQ
- 2023 Lost semi-final

Portage Terriers defeated Niverville Nighthawks 4-games-to-1
Virden Oil Capitals defeated Portage Terriers 4-games-to-3

- 2024 Lost quarter-final

Winkler Flyers defeated Portage Terriers 4-games-to-1

== Notable executives ==
- E. A. Gilroy, manager of the Terriers for the 1938–39 season

== Notable alumni ==
- Lin Bend
- Rick Blight
- Bryan Hextall
- Jason Kasdorf
- Junior Lessard
- Dave McDonald
- Curt Ridley
- Black Jack Stewart
- J. P. Vigier

== See also ==
- List of ice hockey teams in Manitoba

Preceded by Guelph CMC's	Centennial Cup Champions; 1973	Succeeded by Selkirk Steelers
Preceded by Yorkton Terriers	Royal Bank Cup Champions; 2015	Succeeded by West Kelowna Warriors
