= Muzz MacPherson Award =

The Muzz MacPherson Award is a trophy that is presented to the Manitoba Junior Hockey League coach judged to have contributed the most to his team’s success. The trophy is named after former coach Murray MacPherson, who led the Portage Terriers to the 1973 Centennial Cup national championship.

== MJHL Coaches of the Year ==
Season	Winner	Team
2008	Blake Spiller	Portage Terriers
2007	Craig Atkinson	Neepawa Natives
2006	Drew Schoneck	OCN Blizzard
2005	Don MacGillivray	Portage Terriers
2003	Darryl Einarson	Winkler Flyers
1999	Gardiner MacDougall	OCN Blizzard
1997	Gardiner MacDougall	OCN Blizzard
1995	Don MacGillivray	Neepawa Natives
1994	Bob Miller	Portage Terriers
1968	Jim Walker	St. James Canadians
