= Frank McKinnon Memorial Trophy =

The Frank McKinnon Memorial Trophy is an annual award given by the Manitoba Junior Hockey League (MJHL) to the player adjudged to have exhibited the best type of sportsmanship and gentlemanly conduct combined with a high standard of playing ability during the regular season. The trophy is named after the late former MJHL commissioner and Hockey Canada executive.

== History ==
The first trophy awarded by the MJHL for sportsmanship was the Cadet Trophy. It was succeeded by the Lorne Lyndon Memorial Trophy in 1966, named in honour of one of Canada's most renowned officials who officiated from 1933 to 1953, including six Allan Cup finals, three Memorial Cup finals, and the 1951 Alexander Cup. The Lyndon Trophy was retired in favour of the current trophy, which awarded for the first time during the 2017–18 season.

=== Winners Riley Saunders:1989:st James Canadians ===
Season	Winner	Team
2008	Sean Collins	Waywayseecappo Wolverines
2007	Jeff Penner	Dauphin Kings
2006	Travis Kornelsen	Selkirk Steelers
2005	Adam Corrin	Winnipeg South Blues
1977	Ken Krentz	Selkirk Steelers
1974	Gord Lidstone	West Kildonan North Stars
1973	George Newbury	St. James Canadians
1968	Andy Miles	Winnipeg Monarchs
1967	Butch Goring	Winnipeg Rangers
1966	Gerry Mazur	Winnipeg Rangers
1965	Bill Scott	Winnipeg Monarchs
1964	Jim Irving	Winnipeg Rangers
1963	Bruce Wright	Winnipeg Monarchs
