= MJHL Playoff MVP =

The MJHL Playoff Most Valuable Player Award is presented to the player judged most valuable player to his team in each season's Manitoba Junior Hockey League ice hockey playoff competition.

== MJHL Playoff MVP ==
Season	Winner	Team
2024	Malachi Klassen	Winkler Flyers
2012	Kajon McKay	Portage Terriers
2011	Tyler Moore	Portage Terriers
2010	Joe Caligiuri	Dauphin Kings
2009	Drew Ellement	Portage Terriers
2008	Cody Pollon	Portage Terriers
2007	Russ Payne	Selkirk Steelers
2006	Andrew Loewen	Winnipeg South Blues
2005	Steve Haddon	Portage Terriers
2004	Dustin Hughes	Selkirk Steelers
