= Brian Kozak Award =

The Brian Kozak Award is presented annually to the Manitoba Junior Hockey League's defenceman who demonstrates throughout the season the greatest all-round ability in the position during the regular season. The award was first presented in 1977.

== MJHL Top Defencemen ==
| Season | Winner | Team |
|---|---|---|
| 2014 | Joel Messner | Selkirk Steelers |
| 2008 | Jason Gray | Winnipeg South Blues |
| 2007 | Wade Poplawski | Winnipeg South Blues |
| 2006 | Ryan Constant | OCN Blizzard |
| 2005 | Devrin Stonehouse | Neepawa Natives |
| 2003 | Colin Tetrault | Southeast Blades |
| 2002 | Steve Mullin | Winkler Flyers |
| 2001 | Derek Miller | Neepawa Natives |
| 1996 | Troy Christensen | Winnipeg Saints |
| 1995 | Troy Christensen | St. Boniface Saints |
| 1982 | Grant Ledyard | Fort Garry Blues |
| 1977 | Mark Johnston | Portage Terriers |
