= 2022–23 MJHL season =

- League: Manitoba Junior Hockey League
- Sport: Ice hockey
- Games: 377
- Teams: 13

Regular Season
- First Place: Portage Terriers
- Season MVP: Lucas Brennan
- Top scorer: Lucas Brennan

Playoffs
- Playoffs MVP: Dawson Milliken

Turnbull Cup
- Champions: Steinbach Pistons

List of MJHL seasons
- ← 2021–22 2023–24 →

The 2022–23 season was the Manitoba Junior Hockey League's (MJHL) 106th season of operation.

== Season Highlights ==
- The Niverville Nighthawks join the MJHL, playing in the East Division.
- The Winnipeg Blues and Winnipeg Freeze relocate to the hockey for all centre (formerly the Bell MTS Iceplex) in west Winnipeg.
- The Steinbach Pistons win their third Turnbull Cup.
- The Portage Terriers and the city of Portage la Prairie host the 2023 Centennial Cup.

== Standings ==
East Division	GP	W	L	OTL	SO	Pts	GF	GA
Portage Terriers	58	43	11	1	3	90	249	163
Steinbach Pistons	58	42	15	0	1	85	227	139
Winkler Flyers	58	35	16	6	1	77	193	140
Niverville Nighthawks	58	26	28	1	3	56	214	212
Selkirk Steelers	58	23	29	4	2	52	188	219
Winnipeg Blues	58	17	33	7	1	42	170	262
Winnipeg Freeze	58	4	51	3	0	11	113	290
West Division	GP	W	L	OTL	SO	Pts	GF	GA
Swan Valley Stampeders	58	36	16	5	1	78	223	173
OCN Blizzard	58	33	19	2	4	72	201	157
Virden Oil Capitals	58	35	22	1	0	71	182	185
Dauphin Kings	58	32	21	3	2	69	201	189
Waywayseecappo Wolverines	58	29	24	3	2	63	186	193
Neepawa Titans	58	22	27	8	1	53	181	206

== Playoffs ==
=== Brackets ===
Quarterfinals
E1	Portage	4
E4	Niverville	1
E2	Steinbach	4
E3	Winkler	3
(Pairings are reseeded after the first round)
W1	Swan Valley	4
W4	Dauphin	2
W2	OCN	2
W3	Virden	4

Semi-finals
Portage	3
Virden	4
Steinbach	4
Swan Valley	2

Finals
Virden	1
Steinbach	4

== League awards ==
- Steve "Boomer" Hawrysh Award (MVP): Lucas Brennan, Selkirk Steelers
- Ed Belfour Top Goaltender Trophy: Kobe Grant, Swan Valley Stampeders
- Brian Kozak Award (Top Defenceman): Trent Sambrook, Winkler Flyers
- Kim Davis Trophy (Rookie of the Year): Carter Cormier, Selkirk Steelers
- Frank McKinnon Memorial Trophy (Hockey Ability and Sportsmanship): Ryan Botterill, Portage Terriers
- Muzz McPherson Award (Coach of the Year): Tyson Ramsey, Virden Oil Capitals
- Mike Ridley Trophy (Scoring Champion): Lucas Brennan, Selkirk Steelers
- MJHL Playoff MVP: Dawson Milliken, Steinbach Pistons
