= 2020–21 MJHL season =

- League: Manitoba Junior Hockey League
- Sport: Ice hockey
- Games: 46
- Teams: 12

Regular Season
- First Place: not awarded
- Season MVP: not awarded
- Top scorer: not awarded

Turnbull Cup
- Champions: Not awarded
- Playoff MVP: Not awarded

List of MJHL seasons
- ← 2019–20 2021–22 →

The 2020–21 season was the Manitoba Junior Hockey League's (MJHL) 104th year of operation. The league was unable to complete the season for the second consecutive year due to the COVID-19 pandemic.

== Season notes ==
- The Winnipeg Freeze join the MJHL, bringing the league back to twelve teams for the first time since the St. James Canadians folded after the 2002–03 season.
- Kevin Saurette succeeds Kim Davis as commissioner.
- COVID-19 pandemic measures:
  - The league adopts a three division format with each team scheduled to play forty games instead of the customary sixty. Standings are based on winning percentage instead of points earned.
  - All showcase events are cancelled.
  - The league suspends play on November 12, 2020 due to provincial health orders requiring the shutdown of all public sporting events. The remainder of the season and playoffs are officially cancelled on February 12, 2021.
  - Hockey Canada and the Canadian Junior Hockey League cancel the 2021 ANAVET and Centennial Cups for the second consecutive year.

== Standings ==
Standings when play halted on November 12, 2020:

Interior Division	GP	W	L	OTL	SOL	Pts	Win %	GF	GA
Virden Oil Capitals	9	8	0	1	0	17	.944	39	24
Portage Terriers	8	4	3	1	0	9	.563	25	25
Winkler Flyers	8	3	5	0	0	6	.375	23	28
Neepawa Natives	10	2	6	2	0	4	.300	23	38
Northwest Division	GP	W	L	OTL	SOL	Pts	Win %	GF	GA
Waywayseecappo Wolverines	10	7	3	0	0	14	.700	40	35
Swan Valley Stampeders	9	5	4	0	0	10	.556	41	37
Dauphin Kings	6	3	3	0	0	6	.500	26	21
OCN Blizzard	6	1	4	1	0	3	.250	23	32
Southeast Division	GP	W	L	OTL	SOL	Pts	Win %	GF	GA
Winnipeg Blues	6	5	0	0	1	11	.917	30	10
Steinbach Pistons	7	5	1	0	0	11	.786	29	12
Selkirk Steelers	8	3	5	0	0	6	.375	16	29
Winnipeg Freeze	5	0	4	0	1	1	.100	6	30
