= 2025–26 MJHL season =

109th season of the MJHL

- League: MJHL
- Sport: Junior ice hockey
- Duration: Preseason; September; Regular season September–March; Playoffs; March–April
- Games: 377
- Teams: 13
- Total attendance: 200,175
- Streaming partner: FloSports

Turnbull Cup
- Champions: Niverville Nighthawks
- Runners-up: Virden Oil Capitals

List of MJHL seasons
- ← 2024–25 2026–27 →

The 2025–26 MJHL season was the 109th season of the Manitoba Junior Hockey League (MJHL).

The franchise formerly known as the Winnipeg Freeze were rebranded as the Winnipeg Monarchs.

The Steinbach Pistons moved into a new home arena at the Southeast Event Centre in March 2025. The Pistons' former home at the T.G. Smith Arena in Steinbach closed in mid-2023. During the construction of the new arena, the Pistons played their home games at the HyLife Centre in La Broquerie.

The Niverville Nighthawks won their first Turnbull Cup as league champions and went on to capture the Centennial Cup as Canadian Junior Hockey League champions.

Austin Dubinsky of Niverville was named Goaltender of the Year by the Canadian Junior Hockey League (CJHL).

== Regular season ==
Each team played a 58-game regular season schedule. The top 4 teams from each division advanced to the playoffs.

East division
Rank	Team	GP	W	L	OTL	SOL	Pts
1	Niverville Nighthawks	58	51	6	1	0	103
2	Steinbach Pistons	58	47	9	2	0	96
3	Portage Terriers	58	39	18	1	0	79
4	Winkler Flyers	58	34	20	2	2	72
5	Selkirk Steelers	58	20	35	2	1	43
6	Winnipeg Blues	58	18	36	4	0	40
7	Winnipeg Monarchs	58	11	45	2	0	24

Source: "2025–26 MJHL standings". hockeydb.com.

West division
Rank	Team	GP	W	L	OTL	SOL	Pts
1	Virden Oil Capitals	58	39	14	3	2	83
2	Dauphin Kings	58	33	23	2	0	68
3	Waywayseecappo Wolverines	58	29	24	3	2	63
4	Neepawa Titans	58	28	28	1	1	58
5	Swan Valley Stampeders	58	20	33	3	2	45
6	Northern Manitoba Blizzard	58	8	43	4	3	23

Source: "2025–26 MJHL standings". hockeydb.com.

== Playoffs ==
2026 League championship
Turnbull Cup

Tournament details
- Dates: 20 March – 23 April 2026
- Teams: 8

Final positions
- Champions: Niverville Nighthawks (1st title)
- Runners-up: Virden Oil Capitals
- Semifinalists: Steinbach Pistons; Waywayseecappo Wolverines

Tournament statistics
- Games played: 32
- Goals scored: 203 (6.34 per game)
- Attendance: 36,681 (1,146 per game)

Official website
- 2026 MJHL playoffs

The top 4 teams in each division at the end of the regular season advanced to the post-season, which consisted of three best-of-7 play-off rounds.

Quarterfinals
W1	Virden	4
W4	Neepawa	0
E2	Steinbach	4
E3	Portage	1
E1	Niverville	4
E4	Winkler	0
W2	Dauphin	0
W3	Waywayseecappo	4

Semifinals
W1	Virden	3
E2	Steinbach	2
E1	Niverville	4
W3	Waywayseecappo	1

Finals
W1	Virden	0
E1	Niverville	4

Source: "MJHL 2026 playoffs". Manitoba Junior Hockey League.

== National championship ==
2026 National championship
Centennial Cup

Tournament details
- City: Summerside, Prince Edward Island
- Venue: Consolidated Credit Union Place
- Dates: 7–17 May 2026
- Teams: 10
- Host team: Summerside Western Capitals

Final positions
- Champions: Niverville Nighthawks (1st title)
- Runners-up: Summerside Western Capitals
- Semifinalists: Collège Français de Longueuil; Toronto Patriots

Tournament statistics
- Games played: 25
- Goals scored: 178 (7.12 per game)

Awards
- MVP: Adam Vigfusson

Official website
- Hockey Canada

The championship Niverville Nighthawks went on to win the national championship 2026 Centennial Cup in Summerside, Prince Edward Island. After going undefeated in the round robin, the Nighthawks defeated the Toronto Patriots in the semifinal and Summerside Western Capitals in the championship game. This was the first national championship for the Nighthawks and only the fourth time that an MJHL team won the national Junior 'A' championship.

=== Round robin ===
Teams were randomly assigned to Group A or Group B. During the preliminary round robin phase, each team played each other team in their group once. Three points were awarded for a win in regulation time, two points for a win in overtime or shootout, one point for a loss in overtime or shootout, and no points were awarded for a loss in regulation time.

The Niverville Nighthawks and Collège Français de Longueuil advanced to the semifinals after placing first in their respective groups. The Summerside Western Capitals, Canmore Eagles, Toronto Patriots and Truro Bearcats advanced to the quarterfinals.

	Group A	NN	SW	CE	RN	TN
1	Niverville		5-4	6-4	7-6	7-2
2	Summerside	4-5		1-5	4-2	5-3
3	Canmore Eagles	4-6	5-1		3-2	3-2
4	Rockland Nationals	6-7	2-4	2-3		8-2
5	Thunder Bay	2-7	3-5	2-3	2-8	

	Group B	CF	TP	TB	FB	GC
1	Longueuil		7-4	1-2	1-0	3-1
2	Toronto Patriots	4-7		1-6	7-2	8-3
3	Truro Bearcats	2-1	6-1		1-3	6-4
4	Flin Flon Bombers	0-1	2-7	3-1		6-4
5	Greater Sudbury Cubs	1-3	3-8	4-6	4-6	

=== Playoffs ===
The Niverville Nighthawks and Collège Français de Longueuil each had a bye in the quarterfinal round. The Summerside Western Capitals defeated the Truro Bearcats and the Toronto Patriots defeated the Canmore Eagles. In the semifinals, Summerside defeated Longueuil and Niverville defeated Toronto.

Quarterfinals
Summerside Western Capitals	3
Truro Bearcats	1
Toronto Patriots	7
Canmore Eagles	3

Semifinals
Summerside Western Capitals	5
Collège Français de Longueuil	2
Niverville Nighthawks	4
Toronto Patriots	3

Finals
Summerside Western Capitals	1
Niverville Nighthawks	4

== Sources ==
- "2025–26 MJHL standings". hockeydb.com.
- Cash, Martin (10 January 2025). "'Game-changer for the province, not just for Steinbach': Manitoba's Southeast Event Centre to open in spring". Winnipeg Free Press.
- Thiessen, Jared (13 June 2025). "MJHL coaching wins record holder signs on for another three seasons". PortageOnline.
- Dankochik, Cassidy (18 September 2025). "Team storylines to follow as the Manitoba Junior Hockey League regular season starts Friday". Winnipeg Free Press.
- "MJHL, SJHL announce Western All-Star Challenge". mjhlhockey.ca (Press release). Winnipeg, MB: Manitoba Junior Hockey League. 25 September 2025.
- Douglas, Cooper (6 November 2025). "SJHL falls to MJHL in final All-Star Challenge game in Martensville". WestCentralOnline.com.
- Walchuk, Benny (6 November 2025). "MJHL rallies late to defeat SJHL in Western All Star Challenge finale". SaskToday.ca. Harvard Media.
- "MJHL splits Western All-Star Challenge". mjhlhockey.ca. Martensville, SK: Manitoba Junior Hockey League. 6 November 2025.
- Dankochik, Cassidy (6 November 2025). "MJHL's top players aiming for spot on Team Canada". The Carillon.
- Shin, Harrison (18 May 2026). "Niverville Nighthawks win Centennial Cup national championship". CTVNews. Bell Media.
