= 2023–24 MJHL season =

- League: Manitoba Junior Hockey League
- Sport: Ice hockey
- Duration: September–March
- Games: 58
- Teams: 13

2023 Draft
- Top draft pick: Noah Oughton
- Picked by: Winnipeg Freeze

Turnbull Cup
- League champions: Winkler Flyers
- Runners-up: Steinbach Pistons
- Top scorer: Dalton Andrew

ANAVET Cup
- Manitoba champions: Winkler Flyers
- Saskatchewan champions: Melfort Mustangs

List of MJHL seasons
- ← 2022–23 2024–25 →

The 2023–24 season was the 107th season of the Manitoba Junior Hockey League (MJHL).

== Season Highlights ==
The Winkler Flyers won their first league championship since 1998 after sweeping the Steinbach Pistons in the finals.

Portage Terriers Head Coach, Blake Spiller, became the all-time winningest coach in MJHL regular season history.

=== Awards ===
The annual award recipients for the 2023–24 MJHL season are listed below:

- Steve "Boomer" Hawrysh MVP Award: Trent Penner
- Ed Belfour Top Goaltender Trophy: Tomas Anderson
- Brian Kozak Top Defenceman Award: Noah Szabo
- Kim Davis Rookie of the Year Award: Grady Hoffman
- Frank McKinnon Memorial Award for Hockey Ability and Sportsmanship: Josh Lehto
- Muzz McPherson Coach of the Year Award: Eric Labrosse
- Mike Ridley Trophy for the league scoring champion: Dalton Andrew
- MJHL Playoff MVP: Malachi Klassen

== Standings ==
Note: GP = Games Played, W = Wins, L = Losses, OTL = Overtime Losses, SOL = Shootout Losses, Pts = Points, GF = Goals For, GA = Goals Against

East Division	GP	W	L	OTL	SOL	Pts	GF	GA
Steinbach Pistons	58	47	8	3	0	97	244	103
Winkler Flyers	58	42	11	2	3	89	234	122
Portage Terriers	58	36	14	4	4	80	213	156
Niverville Nighthawks	58	30	24	3	1	64	181	184
Selkirk Steelers	58	25	23	5	5	60	161	174
Winnipeg Blues	58	9	44	4	1	23	117	297
Winnipeg Freeze	58	8	45	5	0	21	125	306
West Division	GP	W	L	OTL	SOL	Pts	GF	GA
Virden Oil Capitals	58	40	12	3	3	86	229	134
OCN Blizzard	58	39	15	1	3	82	186	134
Dauphin Kings	58	38	17	2	1	79	206	139
Neepawa Titans	58	28	29	1	0	57	194	201
Waywayseecappo Wolverines	58	24	30	1	3	52	190	217
Swan Valley Stampeders	58	11	44	3	0	25	143	256

== Playoff results ==
Quarterfinals
Steinbach	4
Niverville	0
Portage	1
Winkler	4
(Pairings are reseeded after the first round)
Virden	4
Neepawa	2
OCN	4
Dauphin	3

Semi-finals
Winkler	4
Virden	2
Steinbach	4
OCN	3

Finals
Winkler	4
Steinbach	0
