= 2018–19 MJHL season =

- League: Manitoba Junior Hockey League
- Sport: Ice hockey
- Games: 330
- Teams: 11

Regular Season
- First Place: Portage Terriers
- Season MVP: Josh Tripp
- Top scorer: Josh Tripp

Turnbull Cup
- Champions: Portage Terriers
- Runners-up: Swan Valley Stampeders

List of MJHL seasons
- ← 2017–18 2019–20 →

The 2018–19 season was the Manitoba Junior Hockey League's (MJHL) 102nd year of operation. The Portage Terriers defeated the Swan Valley Stampeders to win the Turnbull Cup for the ninth time in fifteen years.

== Season notes ==
- The MJHL reduces the number of 20-year-old players permitted on each team's roster from nine to eight, with the ultimate target of six by 2021.
- The MJHL renames the MJHL Top Goaltender Award as the Ed Belfour Top Goaltender Trophy.
- The annual Showcase takes place at Seven Oaks Arena in Winnipeg from December 9-12, 2018.
- The MJHL and SJHL hold a joint showcase in Regina, Saskatchewan January 14-15, 2019.
- Former OCN Blizzard player Brady Keeper signs a National Hockey League entry-level contract with the Florida Panthers.
- The Portage Terriers win their fourth Turnbull Cup in five seasons after defeating the Swan Valley Stampeders 4-games-to-3 in the finals.

== Standings ==
	GP	W	L	OTL	SOL	Pts	GF	GA
Portage Terriers	60	46	11	2	1	95	277	150
Swan Valley Stampeders	60	42	13	3	2	89	251	167
Steinbach Pistons	60	39	17	4	0	82	197	127
Selkirk Steelers	60	34	20	4	3	74	202	183
Virden Oil Capitals	60	31	21	4	4	70	214	196
Winnipeg Blues	60	31	22	2	5	69	195	182
Dauphin Kings	60	29	25	3	3	66	186	193
Waywayseecappo Wolverines	60	28	27	2	3	61	161	177
Winkler Flyers	60	23	32	5	0	51	152	221
OCN Blizzard	60	18	40	2	0	38	153	258
Neepawa Natives	60	9	43	4	4	26	130	264

== Playoffs ==
Quarterfinals
1	Portage	4
8	Waywayseecappo	0
2	Swan Valley	4
7	Dauphin	0
3	Steinbach	4
6	Winnipeg	2
4	Selkirk	2
5	Virden	4

Semifinals
1	Portage	4
5	Virden	0
2	Swan Valley	4
3	Steinbach	2

Turnbull Cup Finals
1	Portage	4
2	Swan Valley	3

=== Post MJHL playoffs ===
ANAVET Cup

- Portage Terriers defeated Battlefords North Stars 4-games-to-1

2019 National Junior A Championship

- Portage Terriers finish fifth (0-4-0) in the round robin and are eliminated from the playoffs

== League awards ==
- Steve "Boomer" Hawrysh Award (MVP): Josh Tripp, Swan Valley
- Ed Belfour Top Goaltender Trophy: Jeremy Link, Winnipeg
- Brian Kozak Award (Top Defenceman): Quinton Sudom, Swan Valley
- Vince Leah Trophy (Rookie of the Year): Owen Murray, Portage
- Frank McKinnon Memorial Trophy (Hockey Ability and Sportsmanship): Ben Dalke, Virden
- Muzz McPherson Award (Coach of the Year): Blake Spiller, Portage
- Mike Ridley Trophy (Scoring Champion): Josh Tripp, Swan Valley
- MJHL Playoff MVP:

== See also ==
- ANAVET Cup
- 2019 National Junior A Championship
