= 2021–22 MJHL season =

- League: Manitoba Junior Hockey League
- Sport: Ice hockey
- Games: 324
- Teams: 12

Regular Season
- First Place: Steinbach Pistons
- Season MVP: Braden Fischer
- Top scorer: Justin Svenson

Playoffs
- Playoffs MVP: Carson Cherepak

Turnbull Cup
- Champions: Dauphin Kings

List of MJHL seasons
- ← 2020–21 2022–23 →

The 2021–22 season was the Manitoba Junior Hockey League's (MJHL) 105th season of operation.

== Season Highlights ==
- The MJHL returned to a two-division format.
- The Neepawa Natives changed their team name to the Titans.
- This was the first full season of play for the Winnipeg Freeze after the abbreviated 2020–21 season. The Freeze relocated to the Jonathon Toews Sportsplex in St. Vital, Winnipeg prior to the season.
- The MJHL Showcase was played from November 22 to 24, 2021 at Stride Place in Portage la Prairie.
- The Dauphin Kings defeated the Steinbach Pistons 4-games-to-3 to win the Turnbull Cup.

== Standings ==
| East Division | GP | W | L | OTL | SO | Pts | GF | GA |
|---|---|---|---|---|---|---|---|---|
| Steinbach Pistons | 54 | 42 | 9 | 2 | 1 | 87 | 239 | 122 |
| Winkler Flyers | 54 | 33 | 16 | 3 | 2 | 71 | 201 | 153 |
| Winnipeg Blues | 54 | 29 | 22 | 1 | 2 | 61 | 174 | 173 |
| Selkirk Steelers | 54 | 24 | 24 | 4 | 4 | 54 | 185 | 200 |
| Portage Terriers | 54 | 23 | 24 | 5 | 2 | 53 | 169 | 186 |
| Winnipeg Freeze | 54 | 10 | 40 | 4 | 0 | 24 | 146 | 297 |
| West Division | GP | W | L | OTL | SO | Pts | GF | GA |
| Dauphin Kings | 54 | 41 | 12 | 1 | 0 | 83 | 221 | 133 |
| Waywayseecappo Wolverines | 54 | 33 | 18 | 2 | 1 | 69 | 241 | 187 |
| Virden Oil Capitals | 54 | 30 | 20 | 4 | 0 | 64 | 203 | 183 |
| Swan Valley Stampeders | 54 | 22 | 27 | 1 | 4 | 49 | 169 | 192 |
| Neepawa Titans | 54 | 19 | 26 | 4 | 5 | 47 | 178 | 222 |
| OCN Blizzard | 54 | 18 | 29 | 3 | 4 | 43 | 148 | 226 |

== Playoffs ==
=== Brackets ===
Quarterfinals
E1 | Steinbach | 4
E4 | Selkirk | 1
E2 | Winkler | 4
E3 | Winnipeg Blues | 2
(Pairings are reseeded after the first round)
W1 | Dauphin | 4
W4 | Swan Valley | 2
W2 | Waywayseecappo | 0
W3 | Virden | 4

Semi-finals
Steinbach | 4
Virden | 2
Dauphin | 4
Winkler | 1

Finals
Steinbach | 3
Dauphin | 4

=== Quarter-final round results ===
Series A - (E1) Steinbach Pistons vs (E4) Selkirk Steelers

| Fri Mar 25 | Steinbach Pistons | 5-2 | Selkirk Steelers | T.G. Smith Centre | Recap |

| Sun Mar 27 | Selkirk Steelers | 3-1 | Steinbach Pistons | Selkirk Recreation Complex | Recap |

| Fri Apr 1 | Steinbach Pistons | 3-0 | Selkirk Steelers | T.G. Smith Centre | Recap |

| Sun Apr 3 | Selkirk Steelers | 5-6 | Steinbach Pistons | Selkirk Recreation Complex | Recap |

| Wed Apr 6 | Steinbach Pistons | 4-3 | Selkirk Steelers | T.G. Smith Centre | Recap |

| Steinbach wins 4-1 |

Series B - (E2) Winkler Flyers vs (E3) Winnipeg Blues

| Fri Mar 25 | Winkler Flyers | 9-3 | Winnipeg Blues | Winkler Arena | Recap |

| Mon Mar 28 | Winnipeg Blues | 1-0 | Winkler Flyers | The Rink Training Centre | Recap |

| Wed Mar 30 | Winnipeg Blues | 5-3 | Winkler Flyers | The Rink Training Centre | Recap |

| Fri Apr 1 | Winkler Flyers | 4-3 | 2OT | Winnipeg Blues | Winkler Arena | Recap |

| Sun Apr 3 | Winkler Flyers | 3-1 | Winnipeg Blues | Winkler Arena | Recap |

| Wed Apr 6 | Winnipeg Blues | 2-4 | Winkler Flyers | The Rink Training Centre | Recap |

| Winkler wins 4-2 |

Series C - (W1) Dauphin Kings vs (W4) Swan Valley Stampeders

| Sat Mar 26 | Dauphin Kings | 5-1 | Swan Valley Stampeders | Credit Union Place | Recap |

| Tue Mar 29 | Dauphin Kings | 3-2 | Swan Valley Stampeders | Credit Union Place | Recap |

| Fri Apr 1 | Swan Valley Stampeders | 1-6 | Dauphin Kings | Swan River Centennial Arena | Recap |

| Mon Apr 4 | Swan Valley Stampeders | 6-3 | Dauphin Kings | Swan River Centennial Arena | Recap |

| Fri Apr 8 | Dauphin Kings | 4-5 | 2OT | Swan Valley Stampeders | Credit Union Place | Recap |

| Sun Apr 10 | Swan Valley Stampeders | 2-3 | 2OT | Dauphin Kings | Swan River Centennial Arena | Recap |

| Dauphin wins 4-2 |

Series D - (W2) Waywayseecappo Wolverines vs (W3) Virden Oil Capitals

| Fri Mar 25 | Waywayseecappo Wolverines | 2-3 | OT | Virden Oil Capitals | Waywayseecappo Arena | Recap |

| Sun Mar 27 | Virden Oil Capitals | 4-3 | Waywayseecappo Wolverines | Tundra Oil & Gas Place | Recap |

| Thu Mar 31 | Waywayseecappo Wolverines | 4-5 | OT | Virden Oil Capitals | Waywayseecappo Arena | Recap |

| Sat Apr 2 | Virden Oil Capitals | 4-2 | Waywayseecappo Wolverines | Tundra Oil & Gas Place | Recap |

| Virden Wins 4-0 |

=== Semi-final round results ===
Series E - (E1) Steinbach Pistons vs (W3) Virden Oil Capitals

| Fri Apr 15 | Steinbach Pistons | 5-4 | OT | Virden Oil Capitals | T.G. Smith Centre | Recap |

| Sat Apr 16 | Steinbach Pistons | 2-4 | Virden Oil Capitals | T.G. Smith Centre | Recap |

| Tue Apr 19 | Virden Oil Capitals | 4-5 | OT | Steinbach Pistons | Tundra Oil & Gas Place | Recap |

| Wed Apr 20 | Virden Oil Capitals | 2-1 | Steinbach Pistons | Tundra Oil & Gas Place | Recap |

| Fri Apr 22 | Steinbach Pistons | 8-2 | Virden Oil Capitals | T.G. Smith Centre | Recap |

| Sun Apr 24 | Virden Oil Capitals | 2-4 | Steinbach Pistons | Tundra Oil & Gas Place | Recap |

| Steinbach wins 4-2 |

Series F - (W1) Dauphin Kings vs. (E2) Winkler Flyers

| Sat Apr 16 | Dauphin Kings | 4-2 | Winkler Flyers | Credit Union Place | Recap |

| Sun Apr 17 | Dauphin Kings | 3-1 | Winkler Flyers | Credit Union Place | Recap |

| Wed Apr 20 | Winkler Flyers | 5-4 | Dauphin Kings | Winkler Arena | Recap |

| Tue Apr 22 | Winkler Flyers | 2-5 | Dauphin Kings | Winkler Arena | Recap |

| Sat Apr 23 | Dauphin Kings | 5-1 | Winkler Flyers | Credit Union Place | Recap |

| Dauphin wins 4-1 |

=== Final round results ===
Series G - (E1) Steinbach Pistons vs. (W1) Dauphin Kings

| Fri Apr 29 | Steinbach Pistons | 5-1 | Dauphin Kings | T.G. Smith Centre | Recap |

| Sat Apr 30 | Steinbach Pistons | 1-5 | Dauphin Kings | T.G. Smith Centre | Recap |

| Tues May 3 | Dauphin Kings | 4-5 | OT | Steinbach Pistons | Credit Union Place | Recap |

| Wed May 4 | Dauphin Kings | 5-2 | Steinbach Pistons | Credit Union Place | Recap |

| Fri May 6 | Steinbach Pistons | 2-0 | Dauphin Kings | T.G. Smith Centre | Recap |

| Sun May 8 | Dauphin Kings | 2-0 | Steinbach Pistons | Credit Union Place | Recap |

| Wed May 11 | Steinbach Pistons | 1-2 | Dauphin Kings | T.G. Smith Centre | Recap |

| Dauphin wins 4-3 |

=== Post MJHL playoffs ===
- Hockey Canada and the Canadian Junior Hockey League cancel all regional playoffs, including the ANAVET Cup, in favour of having all league champions advance directly to the 2022 Centennial Cup.
- The Dauphin Kings advance to the semi-final of the Centennial Cup, losing 2-0 to the Pickering Panthers. Carson Cherepak of the Kings, the Most Valuable Player (MVP) of the MJHL playoffs, is named tournament MVP.

== League awards ==
- Steve "Boomer" Hawrysh Award (MVP): Braden Fischer, Virden Oil Capitals
- Ed Belfour Top Goaltender Trophy: Carson Cherepak, Dauphin Kings
- Brian Kozak Award (Top Defenceman): Parker Malchuk, Dauphin Kings
- Vince Leah Trophy (Rookie of the Year): Carson Buydens, Virden Oil Capitals
- Frank McKinnon Memorial Trophy (Hockey Ability and Sportsmanship): Brayden Foreman, Winnipeg Blues
- Muzz McPherson Award (Coach of the Year): Doug Hedley, Dauphin Kings
- Mike Ridley Trophy (Scoring Champion): Justin Svenson, Winkler Flyers
- MJHL Playoff MVP: Carson Cherepak, Dauphin Kings
