= 2026 Centennial Cup =

Ice hockey national championship

2026 National championship
Centennial Cup
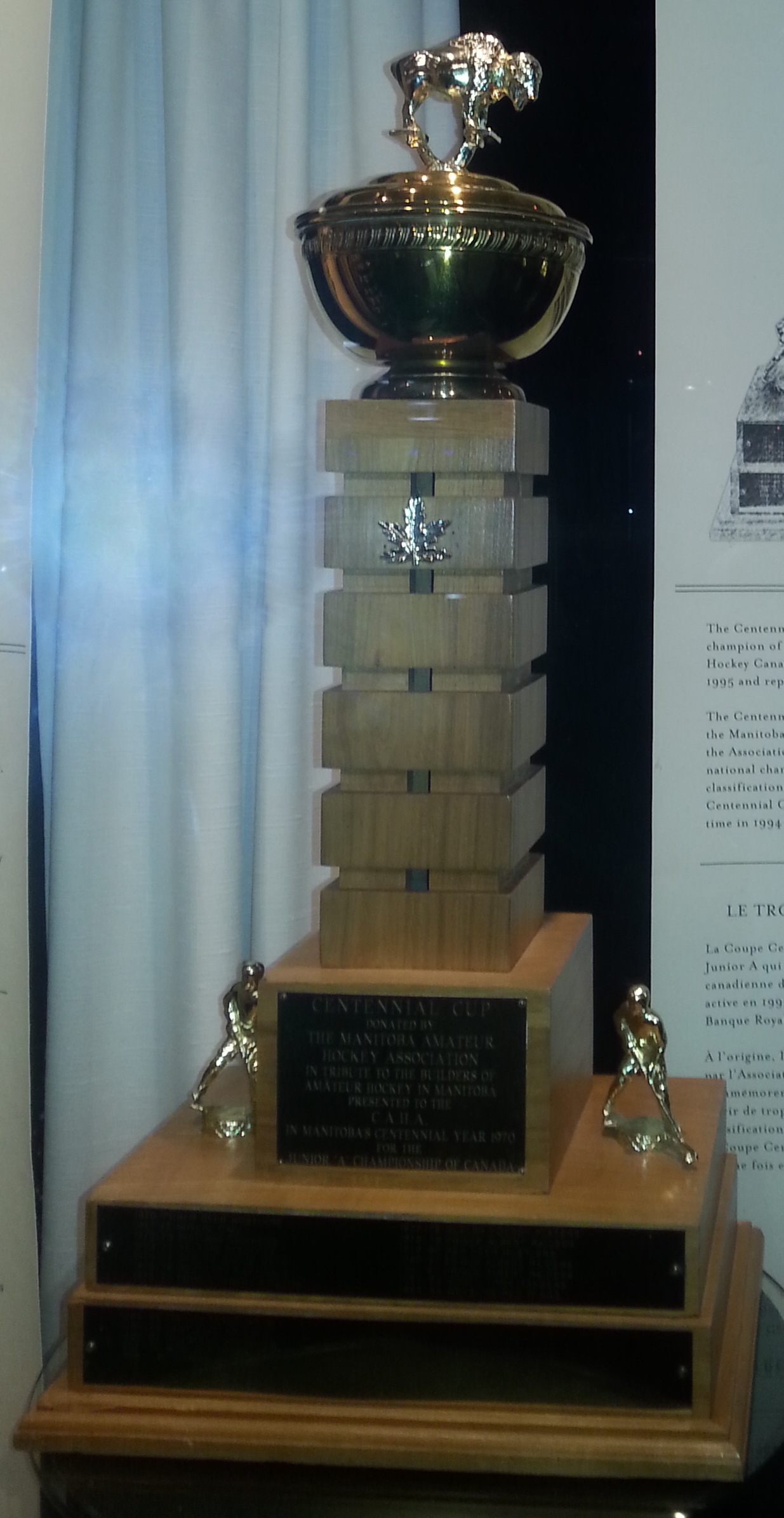

Tournament details
- City: Summerside, Prince Edward Island
- Venue: Consolidated Credit Union Place
- Dates: 7–17 May 2026
- Teams: 10
- Host team: Summerside Western Capitals

Final positions
- Champions: Niverville Nighthawks (1st title)
- Runners-up: Summerside Western Capitals
- Semifinalists: Collège Français de Longueuil; Toronto Patriots

Tournament statistics
- Games played: 25
- Goals scored: 178 (7.12 per game)

Awards
- MVP: Adam Vigfusson

Official website
- Hockey Canada

The 2026 Centennial Cup was the 55th annual Junior A national championship tournament of Hockey Canada. The Niverville Nighthawks of the Manitoba Junior Hockey League (MJHL) won the tournament after beating the host Summerside Western Capitals of the Maritime Junior Hockey League (MHL) in the final. Games were played at Credit Union Place in Summerside, Prince Edward Island. It was Summerside's fourth time hosting the tournament, more than any other city, having hosted in 1989, 1997 and 2013.

== Competition ==
The field of competition includes the championship teams from each of the 9 leagues that collectively make up the Canadian Junior Hockey League (CJHL), namely the Alberta Junior Hockey League (AJHL), Central Canada Hockey League (CCHL), Manitoba Junior Hockey League (MJHL), Maritime Junior Hockey League (MHL), Northern Ontario Junior Hockey League (NOJHL), Ontario Junior Hockey League (OJHL), Quebec Junior Hockey League (LHAAAJQ), Saskatchewan Junior Hockey League (SJHL), Superior International Junior Hockey League (SIJHL), and the host team.

=== Canmore Eagles ===
The Canmore Eagles won their first Alberta Junior Hockey League (AJHL) championship, the Inter Pipeline Cup, in 2026. During the playoffs, the Eagles defeated the defending Centennial Cup champion Calgary Canucks in the first round.

Regular season: 32-19-3-1 (W-L-OTL)
Playoffs: Defeated Calgary Canucks 4-2; defeated Drumheller Dragons 4-0; defeated Whitecourt Wolverines 4-1.

=== Rockland Nationals ===
The Rockland Nationals won their second straight Central Canada Hockey League championship after a strong regular season and playoff performance, losing only four games in league play. The team also appeared in the semifinal of the 2025 Centennial Cup, losing to the host and eventual champion Calgary Canucks.

Regular season: 52-3-0 (W-L-OTL)
Playoffs: Defeated Carleton Place Canadiens 4-1; defeated Kemptville 73's 4-0; defeated Smith Falls Bears 4-0.

=== Niverville Nighthawks ===
A relative newcomer to the Manitoba Junior Hockey League (MJHL), the Niverville Nighthawks won their first Turnbull Cup in 2026. Over both the playoffs and the regular season, the team recorded only eight losses against MJHL opponents. The Nighthawks won out in their first Centennial Cup appearance, completing a dominant season as national champions.

Regular season: 58-6-1 (W-L-OTL)
Playoffs: Defeated Winkler Flyers 4-0; defeated Waywayseecappo Wolverines 4-1; defeated Virden Oil Capitals 4-0.

=== Truro Bearcats ===
In 2026, the Truro Bearcats won their first Maritime Hockey League (MHL) championship since 2017, with 2026 marking the team's first Centennial Cup appearance since 2013.

The Bearcats narrowly finished in second place in the regular season standings behind the host Summerside Western Capitals. Truro would get their revenge in the playoffs, eliminating the host team in a seven-game second round series.

Regular season: 34-14-3-1 (W-L-OTL)
Playoffs: Defeated Pictou County Crushers 4-1; defeated Summerside Western Capitals 4-3; defeated Edmunston Blizzard 4-1.

=== Greater Sudbury Cubs ===
The Greater Sudbury Cubs finished the NOJHL regular season in first place and were undefeated in the league playoffs. It was the club's third consecutive league championship. They were eliminated from the 2026 Centennial Cup after losing three out of four matches in the prelimary round.

Regular season: 39-8-3-2 (W-L-T-OTL)
NOJHL playoffs: Defeated Kirkland Lake Gold Miners 4:0; defeated Soo Eagles 4:0; defeated Timmins Rock 4:0.
Preliminary round: Lost against Collège Français de Longueuil (3:1); lost against the Toronto Patriots (8:3); won against the Truro Bearcats (4:1); lost against the Flin Flon Bombers (6:4).

=== Toronto Patriots ===
The Toronto Patriots returned to the Centennial Cup for the first time in 12 years after winning the Ontario Junior Hockey League championship in 2026.

Regular season: 47-8-0-1 (W-L-T-OTL)
Playoffs: Defeated Mississauga Chargers 4-0; defeated Milton Menace 4-0; defeated Collingwood Blues 4-3; defeated Newmarket Hurricanes 4-1.

=== Collège Français de Longueuil ===
Collège Français de Longueuil of the Quebec Junior Hockey League (LHAAAJ) returned to the Centennial Cup in 2026 as NAPA Cup champions for the third time in five years after a one-year absence, last appearing in 2024.

Regular season: 41-6-1 (W-L-OTL)
Playoffs: Defeated Valleyfield Braves 4-1; defeated 4-0; defeated Everest de la Côte-du-Sud 4-0; Condors du Cégep Beauce-Appalaches 4-0.

=== Flin Flon Bombers ===
After more than 30 years without an Saskatchewan Junior Hockey League (SJHL) championship, the Flin Flon Bombers took home the 2026 Canterra Seeds Cup after a dominant season.

Prior to 2026, the Bombers most recently entered the 2022 Centennial Cup as the host team after losing in the final to the Estevan Bruins.

Regular season: 41-11-4 (W-L-OTL)
SJHL playoffs: Defeated Estevan Bruins (4:0); defeated Weyburn Red Wings (4:3); defeated Yorkton Terriers (4:0).
Preliminary round: Lost against Collège Français de Longueuil (1:0); lost against the Toronto Patriots (7:2); won against the Greater Sudbury Cubs (6:4); won against the Truro Bearcats (3:1).

=== Thunder Bay North Stars ===
After finishing the regular season in third place, the Thunder Bay North Stars defeated the first-place Fort Frances Lakers in game 7 of the final to win the SIJHL championship Bill Salonen Cup.

Regular season: 30-14-4 (W-L-OTL)
Playoffs: Defeated Ironwood Lumberjacks (4:0); defeated Dryden Ice Dogs (4:1); defeated Fort Frances Lakers (4:3).
Preliminary round: Lost against Canmore Eagles (3:2); lost against Niverville Nighthawks (7:2); lost against Rockland Nationals (8:2); lost against Summerside Western Capitals (5:3).

=== Summerside Western Capitals ===
Summerside finished the regular season in first place in the MHL before being eliminated in the league quarterfinal by the second-place Truro Bearcats. As the host team, the Summerside's admission to the tournament was guaranteed.

Regular season: 32-12-8 (W-L-OTL)
Playoffs: Defeated Amherst Ramblers 4–3; lost to Truro Bearcats 4–3.

== Round robin ==
Teams were randomly assigned to Group A or Group B. During the preliminary round robin phase, each team played each other team in their group once. Three points were awarded for a win in regulation time, two points for a win in overtime or shootout, one point for a loss in overtime or shootout, and no points were awarded for a loss in regulation time.

The Niverville Nighthawks and Collège Français de Longueuil advanced to the semifinals after placing first in their respective groups. The Summerside Western Capitals, Canmore Eagles, Toronto Patriots and Truro Bearcats advanced to the quarterfinals.

	Group A	NN	SW	CE	RN	TN
1	Niverville		5-4	6-4	7-6	7-2
2	Summerside	4-5		1-5	4-2	5-3
3	Canmore Eagles	4-6	5-1		3-2	3-2
4	Rockland Nationals	6-7	2-4	2-3		8-2
5	Thunder Bay	2-7	3-5	2-3	2-8	

	Group B	CF	TP	TB	FB	GC
1	Longueuil		7-4	1-2	1-0	3-1
2	Toronto Patriots	4-7		1-6	7-2	8-3
3	Truro Bearcats	2-1	6-1		1-3	1-4
4	Flin Flon Bombers	0-1	2-7	3-1		6-4
5	Greater Sudbury Cubs	1-3	3-8	4-1	4-6	

== Playoffs ==
The Niverville Nighthawks and Collège Français de Longueuil each had a bye in the quarterfinal round. The Summerside Western Capitals defeated the Truro Bearcats and the Toronto Patriots defeated the Canmore Eagles. In the semifinals, Summerside defeated Longueuil and Niverville defeated Toronto.

Quarterfinals
Summerside Western Capitals	3
Truro Bearcats	1
Toronto Patriots	7
Canmore Eagles	3

Semifinals
Summerside Western Capitals	5
Collège Français de Longueuil	2
Niverville Nighthawks	4
Toronto Patriots	3

Finals
Summerside Western Capitals	1
Niverville Nighthawks	4

== Sources ==
- "2026 Centennial Cup Guide & Record Book" (PDF). hockeycanada.ca. Hockey Canada.
- "2026 Centennial Cup bid guidelines" (PDF). Hockey Canada.
- "2025 Centennial Cup Guide & Record Book" (PDF). hockeycanada.ca. Hockey Canada.
- DiRisio, Haeley (1 October 2025). "Summerside, P.E.I., to host 2026 Canadian Junior Hockey League Centennial Cup". CTV News Atlantic. Bell Media.
- "Summerside, P.E.I., to host 2026 Centennial Cup, presented by Tim Hortons". hockeycanada.ca. Calgary, AB: Hockey Canada. 1 October 2025.
- Lavigne, Carl (3 April 2026). "En route pour la Coupe du centenaire". lhjaaaq.com (in French). Montréal: Ligue de Hockey Junior AAA du Québec.
- "Schedule | 2026 Centennial Cup". hockeycanada.ca. Hockey Canada.
- Weyland, Blaine (14 May 2026). "Bombers run at Centennial Cup comes to an end". discoverhumboldt.com.
- "Rockland misses Centennial Cup playoffs". Brockville Recorder and Times. Postmedia. 15 May 2026.
- "Niverville defeat Summerside 4-1 in Centennial Cup Final". Maritime Junior Hockey League. 17 May 2026.
- Burfoot, Bill (17 May 2026). "Small Town, National Crown: Nighthawks Win Centennial Cup". NivervilleOnline.
- Anthony, Dave (17 May 2026). "The Niverville Nighthawks are National Champions!". SteinbachOnline.
- La Rose, Jason (17 May 2026). "#Road2Centennial: By the numbers". hockeycanada.ca. Hockey Canada.
- Shin, Harrison (18 May 2026). "Niverville Nighthawks win Centennial Cup national championship". CTVNews. Bell Media.
- Bernhardt, Darren (18 May 2026). "Niverville Nighthawks crowned national Junior A champions for 1st time". CBC News. CBC/Radio-Canada.
- Villagracia, Reuben (13 May 2026). "North Stars finish winless at Centennial Cup". The Chronicle-Journal.
