= 1956–57 MJHL season =

Manitoba ice hockey season

== League notes ==
The League admits the Winnipeg Rangers. This team is not to be confused with the Winnipeg Barons, who were formerly called the Winnipeg Rangers.
Ray Brunel (St. Boniface) set a league record for most points (105) in a single season.

== Regular season ==
League Standings	GP	W	L	T	Pts	GF	GA
St. Boniface Canadiens	30	26	4	0	52	260	100
Winnipeg Monarchs	29	17	8	4	38	175	146
Winnipeg Rangers	29	7	21	1	15	95	203
Winnipeg Barons	30	5	22	3	13	127	208

== Playoffs ==
Semi-Final

Monarchs defeated Rangers 3-games-to-1

Turnbull Cup Championship

St. Boniface lost to Monarchs 4-games-to-2 with 1 game tied

Western Memorial Cup Semi-Final

Monarchs lost to Fort William Canadiens (TBJHL) 4-games-to-3 with 1 game tied

== Awards ==
Trophy	Winner	Team
MVP	Ray Brunel	St. Boniface Canadiens
Top Goaltender		
Scoring Champion	Ray Brunel	St. Boniface Canadiens
Most Goals	Ray Brunel	St. Boniface Canadiens
