= Winnipeg Monarchs (2025) =

Junior ice hockey team

- City: Winnipeg
- League: MJHL
- Division: East
- Founded: 2020
- Home arena: Hockey for All Centre
- Colours: Purple; Gold
- Owners: 50 Below Sports & Entertainment
- General manager: Riley Dudar
- Head coach: Riley Dudar
- Website: winnipegmonarchs.ca

Franchise history
- 2020–2025: Winnipeg Freeze
- Since 2025: Winnipeg Monarchs

The Winnipeg Monarchs are a junior ice hockey franchise of the Manitoba Junior Hockey League (MJHL). The team plays its home games at the Hockey for All Centre in Winnipeg.

The club was founded in 2020 as an expansion franchise called the Winnipeg Freeze. It was rebranded as the Monarchs in 2025.

The club's inaugural season was cancelled midseason due to health restrictions related to the COVID-19 pandemic. Each year since, up to and including 2025–26, the team has finished in last place and failed to qualify for the playoffs.

Statistics
Season	GP	W	L	T	OTL	GF	GA	Pts	Finish	Playoffs
2020–21	5	0	4	-	1	6	30	1	4th in division 12th overall	Cancelled
2021–22	54	10	40	-	4	146	297	24	6th in division 12th overall	Did not qualify
2022–23	58	4	51	-	3	113	290	11	7th in division 13th overall	Did not qualify
2023–24	58	8	45	-	5	125	306	21	7th in division 13th overall	Did not qualify
2024–25	58	6	49	1	2	118	327	15	7th in division 13th overall	Did not qualify
2025–26	58	11	45	0	2	117	273	24	7th in division 12th overall	Did not qualify

Source: "Winnipeg Monarchs statistics and history". hockeydb.com.

== See also ==
- List of ice hockey teams in Manitoba
