= Niverville Nighthawks =

Manitoba junior ice hockey team

- City: Niverville, Manitoba
- League: MJHL
- Division: East
- Founded: 2022
- Home arena: Niverville Community Resource & Recreation Centre
- Colours: Navy; Red; Yellow; Grey
- Owner: Niverville Jr. A Hockey Club
- General manager: Mike McAulay
- Head coach: Dwight Hirst
- Website: mjhlnighthawks.ca

Championships
- League: 2026
- National: 2026

The Niverville Nighthawks are a junior ice hockey franchise of the Manitoba Junior Hockey League (MJHL) based in Niverville, Manitoba. The club debuted as an expansion franchise in the 2022–23 MJHL season.

The club's colours are navy, red, grey, and yellow. Its primary logo features a three-quarters view of a hawk head inside a shield. The secondary logo features an intercrossed double-N design.

The Nighthawks play their home games at the Niverville Community Resource & Recreation Centre (CRRC) arena which opened in 2021 and is owned by the Town of Niverville. In 2023, the seating capacity was increased from 750 to 1,000 to comply with the MJHL standard.

The Nighthawks won their first Turnbull Cup as league champions in 2026 and subsequently went undefeated at the 2026 Centennial Cup to win the Canadian Junior Hockey League championship.

Season-by-season record
Season	GP	W	L	T	OTL	GF	GA	Pts	Finish	Playoffs
2022–23	58	26	28	-	4	214	212	56	4th in division 9th overall	Lost quarterfinal against Portage (4:1)
2023–24	58	30	24	3	1	181	184	56	4th in division 9th overall	Lost quarterfinal against Steinbach (4:0)
2024–25	58	35	20	1	2	207	159	73	4th in division 5th overall	Lost quarterfinal against Winkler (4:2)
2025–26	58	51	6	0	1	280	117	103	1st in division 1st overall	Won quarterfinal against Winkler (4:0); Won semifinal against Waywayseecappo (4:1); Won final against Virden (4:0); Won Centennial Cup

Source: "Niverville Nighthawks hockey team statistics and history". hockeydb.com.

== See also ==
- List of ice hockey teams in Manitoba
- Manitoba Junior Hockey League
