= Mike Ridley =

Canadian ice hockey player

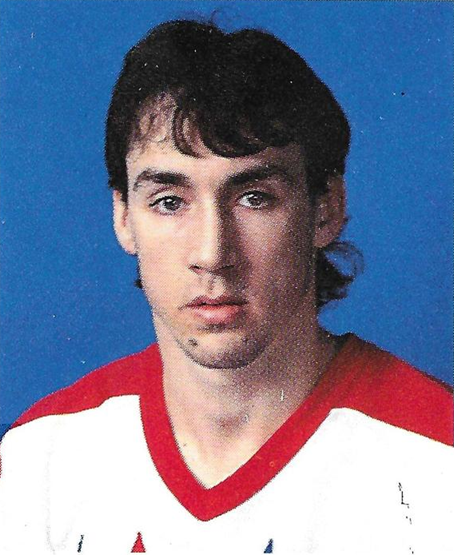
- Ridley in 1986
- Born: July 8, 1963 (age 62) Winnipeg, Manitoba, Canada
- Height: 6 ft 1 in (185 cm)
- Weight: 195 lb (88 kg; 13 st 13 lb)
- Position: Centre
- Shot: Left
- Played for: New York Rangers; Washington Capitals; Toronto Maple Leafs; Vancouver Canucks
- NHL draft: Undrafted
- Playing career: 1985–1997

Michael Owen Guy Ridley (born July 8, 1963) is a Canadian former professional ice hockey centre who played in the NHL for 12 seasons from 1985 until 1997.

Ridley signed with the New York Rangers as an undrafted free agent in September 1985. Ridley played 866 career games, scoring 292 goals and 466 assists for 758 points. His best offensive season was the 1988–89 season, when playing with the Washington Capitals, he scored 41 goals and 89 points, both career highs.

He scored the first Canuck goal ever in General Motors Place, the home of the Vancouver Canucks.

== Career statistics ==
			Regular season					Playoffs
Season	Team	League	GP	G	A	Pts	PIM	GP	G	A	Pts	PIM
1980–81	St. Boniface Saints	MJHL	9	2	1	3	2	—	—	—	—	—
1981–82	St. Boniface Saints	MJHL	48	37	32	69	48	—	—	—	—	—
1982–83	St. Boniface Saints	MJHL	48	91	100	191	49	—	—	—	—	—
1983–84	University of Manitoba	GPAC	46	39	41	80	—	—	—	—	—	—
1984–85	University of Manitoba	GPAC	23	23	36	59	40	7	6	2	8	38
1985–86	New York Rangers	NHL	80	22	43	65	69	16	6	8	14	26
1986–87	New York Rangers	NHL	38	16	20	36	20	—	—	—	—	—
1986–87	Washington Capitals	NHL	40	15	19	34	20	7	2	1	3	6
1987–88	Washington Capitals	NHL	70	28	31	59	22	14	6	5	11	10
1988–89	Washington Capitals	NHL	80	41	48	89	49	6	0	5	5	2
1989–90	Washington Capitals	NHL	74	30	43	73	27	14	3	4	7	8
1990–91	Washington Capitals	NHL	79	23	48	71	26	11	3	4	7	8
1991–92	Washington Capitals	NHL	80	29	40	69	38	7	0	11	11	0
1992–93	Washington Capitals	NHL	84	26	56	82	44	6	1	5	6	0
1993–94	Washington Capitals	NHL	81	26	44	70	24	11	4	6	10	6
1994–95	Toronto Maple Leafs	NHL	48	10	27	37	14	7	3	1	4	2
1995–96	Vancouver Canucks	NHL	37	6	15	21	29	5	0	0	0	2
1996–97	Vancouver Canucks	NHL	75	20	32	52	42	—	—	—	—	—
1997–98	Manitoba Moose	IHL	4	2	2	4	0	—	—	—	—	—
NHL totals			866	292	466	758	424	104	28	50	78	70

== Awards and achievements ==
- MJHL First All-Star Team (1983)
- MJHL Scoring Champion (1983)
- MJHL Goal Scoring Leader (1983)
- GPAC First All-Star Team (1984 and 1985)
- GPAC MVP (1984)
- CIAU All-Canadian (1984 and 1985)
- Canadian University Player of the Year (1984)
- NHL All-Rookie Team (1986)
- Played in NHL All-Star Game (1989)
- "Honoured Member" of the Manitoba Hockey Hall of Fame
- Mike Ridley Trophy named in his honor; awarded annually to the MJHL's top scorer
