= Hockey for All Centre =

Ice hockey venue in Winnipeg, Manitoba, Canada

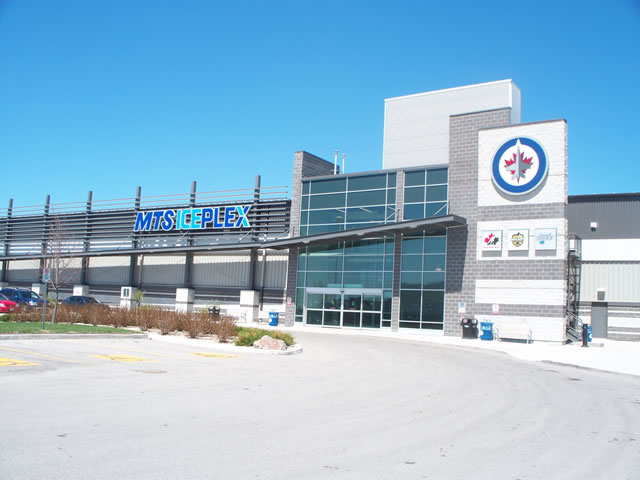
- Interactive map of Hockey for All Centre
- Former names: MTS Iceplex (2010–2017); Bell MTS Iceplex (2017–2022)
- Location: 3969 Portage Avenue; Winnipeg, Manitoba
- Coordinates: 49°53′8″N 97°19′41″W
- Owner: True North Sports & Entertainment Limited
- Operator: Winnipeg Jets

Construction
- Groundbreaking: July 2009
- Opened: August 2010
- Cost: $26.6 million ($37.5 million in 2025 dollars)

Tenants
- Winnipeg Jets (NHL) 2011–present; Manitoba Moose (AHL) 2010–2011; 2015–present; Winnipeg Wild (MU18HL) 2010–present; St. Pauls Crusaders (WHSHL) 2010–present; Balmoral Hall Blazers (JWHL) 2010–present; Winnipeg Monarchs (MJHL) 2022–present; Manitoba Maple Leafs (WWHL) 2010–2011; Winnipeg Blues (MJHL) 2010–2019; 2023–2025; St. Boniface Riels (MMJHL) 2018–2019

Website
- hockeyforallcentre.com

Hockey for All Centre (stylized as hockey for all centre) is an ice hockey facility in Winnipeg, Manitoba, Canada, near the Red River Exhibition.

Owned by True North Sports & Entertainment, the 172,000-square-foot (16,000 m^{2}) complex contains four arenas, and serves as the practice and training facilities of the Winnipeg Jets of the National Hockey League and Manitoba Moose of the American Hockey League, and host of various minor hockey teams and competitions.

== History ==
Initially known as True North MoosePlex Hockey Canada Centre, the facility was built on time and within its budget, at a cost of $26.6 million. The federal and provincial governments contributed $11.7 million, while True North provided the remaining $14.9 million. In exchange for public funding, True North guaranteed use of the facility for local amateur and recreational hockey.

In April 2010, as an extension of its naming rights relationship with Manitoba Telecom Services (MTS) for the MTS Centre, the facility was renamed the MTS Iceplex.

A 21,000-square-foot (2,000 m^{2}) addition to the centre was completed in 2016. As part of this expansion, new training facilities and office space were built for the Jets and Moose.

The facility was renamed Bell MTS Iceplex following Bell Canada's acquisition of MTS in 2017. On November 14, 2022, Scotiabank acquired the naming rights to the facility, renaming it Hockey for All Centre (stylized in lowercase) as an extension of Scotiabank's diversity initiative of the same name.

== Facilities ==
Hockey for All Centre is on the western edge of the city, near the junction of Portage Avenue and the west Perimeter Highway. It is surrounded by the Perimeter Highway to the east, Assiniboia Downs to the north, Pointe West AutoPark to the south, and the Red River Exhibition grounds to the west. The facility is open year-round and consists of four arenas, dryland training facilities, 22 dressing rooms, a pro shop, a restaurant and bar, a conference room, concessions stand and office space for Hockey Manitoba, Hockey Canada, and True North.

Each of the four arenas has an NHL regulation-size ice surface and is sponsored by a local business. The PCL Arena seats 1,512 spectators, while the Flynn, Western Marble, Granite & Tile, and Merit arenas each seat 225 spectators.

== Events ==
The Iceplex was one of three venues that hosted the 2011 World U-17 Hockey Challenge, a major international hockey tournament held annually by Hockey Canada. It was slated to host the 2012 tournament also, but Hockey Canada, at the request of True North, decided to relocate the tournament to Windsor, Ontario.

Some of the annual events taking place at the Iceplex include the Manitoba Senior 'A' hockey championship, the Winnipeg High School Hockey League Rookie Classic and the Hockey Manitoba Cup.

Due to the COVID-19 pandemic and to minimize disruption to Bell MTS Place under NHL COVID-19 protocol, the Manitoba Moose played all but four home games for the shortened 2020–21 AHL season at the Assiniboine Credit Union Arena, with all games played behind closed doors and in compliance with Manitoba public health orders. The arena received upgrades in order to meet AHL standards.
