= 2024–25 MJHL season =

Manitoba Junior Hockey League season

- League: Manitoba Junior Hockey League
- Sport: Ice hockey
- Duration: Regular season September–March; Playoffs; March–April
- Games: 377
- Teams: 13
- Total attendance: 155,972

2024 draft
- Top draft pick: Layne Schofield
- Picked by: Winkler Flyers

Turnbull Cup
- Champions: Northern Manitoba Blizzard
- Runners-up: Dauphin Kings

List of MJHL seasons
- ← 2023–24 2025–26 →

The 2024–25 season was the 108th season of the Manitoba Junior Hockey League (MJHL), a Junior A ice hockey league in Manitoba. The league's 13 teams played a 58-game regular season schedule beginning on 20 September 2024. The Northern Manitoba Blizzard won the league championship Turnbull Trophy and went on to represent the league at the national championship tournament in Calgary.

The 2024 MJHL draft took place on 2 June 2024. The league announced that it would discontinue the player draft in 2025. Consequently, prospects who were born in Manitoba in 2009 will be eligible to sign with any MJHL team. 2023 draft picks who remain unsigned as of August 1, 2024, and 2024 draft picks who remain unsigned as of August 1, 2025, will also be eligible to sign with any MJHL team.

The governing body, Hockey Canada, and its four western regional affiliates – BC Hockey, Hockey Alberta, Hockey Saskatchewan and Hockey Manitoba – will pilot the Western Canadian Development Model (WCDM). Under the WCDM, junior leagues will adopt most of the Western Hockey League rulebook, excluding some sections, and restrictions on 15-year-old affiliate players in the Western Hockey League will be loosened. Players that will be 18-years of age or older in the calendar year will be allowed to choose whether to use full-face protection or half-face protection, whilst younger players will be required to use full-face protection.

The team formerly known as the OCN Blizzard was renamed the Northern Manitoba Blizzard following a change in ownership.

== Regular season ==
Teams played a 58-game regular season schedule. The top 4 teams in each division advanced to the playoffs.

East division
Rank	Team	GP	W	L	OTL	SOL	Pts
1	Winkler Flyers	58	46	8	3	1	96
2	Steinbach Pistons	58	42	11	2	3	89
3	Portage Terriers	58	40	17	0	1	81
4	Niverville Nighthawks	58	35	20	2	1	73
5	Selkirk Steelers	58	29	23	3	3	64
6	Winnipeg Blues	58	9	43	4	2	24
7	Winnipeg Freeze	58	6	49	1	2	15

Source: "2024-25 MJHL standings". hockeydb.com.

West division
Rank	Team	GP	W	L	OTL	SOL	Pts
1	Dauphin Kings	58	37	18	2	1	77
2	Northern Manitoba Blizzard	58	35	22	0	1	71
3	Neepawa Titans	58	32	21	2	3	69
4	Waywayseecappo Wolverines	58	25	30	2	1	53
5	Virden Oil Capitals	58	24	31	2	1	51
6	Swan Valley Stampeders	58	17	34	5	2	41

Source: "2024-25 MJHL standings". hockeydb.com.

== Playoffs ==
2025 League championship
Turnbull Cup

Tournament details
- Dates: 21 March – 27 April
- Teams: 8
- Defending champions: Winkler Flyers

Final positions
- Champions: Northern Manitoba Blizzard
- Runners-up: Dauphin Kings
- Semifinalists: Portage Terriers; Winkler Flyers

Tournament statistics
- Games played: 37
- Goals scored: 205 (5.54 per game)
- Attendance: 47,647 (1,288 per game)

The top 4 teams in each division at the end of the regular season advanced to the post-season, which consisted of three best-of-7 play-off rounds. The Northern Manitoba Blizzard won the league championship Turnbull Trophy and went on to compete for the national championship Centennial Cup.

Quarterfinals
W1	Dauphin Kings	4
W4	Waywayseecappo	1
E2	Steinbach Pistons	2
E3	Portage Terriers	4
W2	Northern Manitoba	4
W3	Neepawa Titans	1
E1	Winkler Flyers	4
E4	Niverville Nighthawks	2

Semifinals
W1	Dauphin Kings	4
E3	Portage Terriers	2
W2	Northern Manitoba	4
E1	Winkler Flyers	0

Finals
W1	Dauphin Kings	3
W2	Northern Manitoba	4

Source: "2025 MJHL playoff results". mjhlhockey.ca. Manitoba Junior Hockey League.

2025 National championship
Centennial Cup
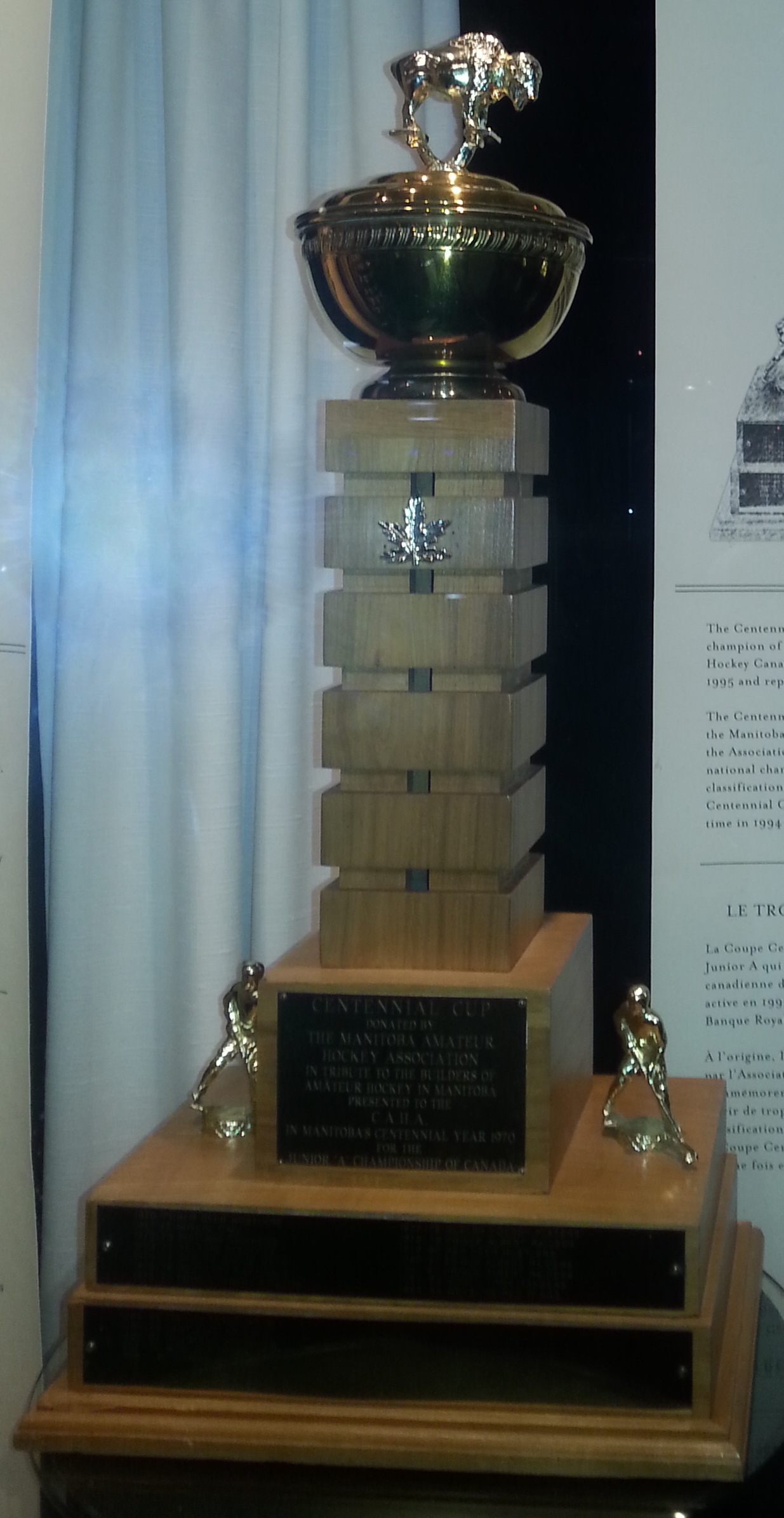

Tournament details
- City: Calgary, AB
- Venue: Max Bell Centre
- Dates: 8–18 May 2025
- Teams: 10
- Host team: Calgary Canucks

Official website
- Hockey Canada
