= Northern Manitoba Blizzard =

Junior ice hockey team

- City: The Pas
- League: MJHL
- Division: West
- Founded: 1996
- Home arena: Roy H. Johnston Arena
- Colours
- Owners: Rob & Bonnie White
- General manager: Mark Patton
- Head coach: Josh Gratton
- Website: normanblizzard.com

Franchise history
- 1996–2024: OCN Blizzard
- Since 2024: Northern Manitoba Blizzard

Championships
- League: 1999; 2000; 2001; 2002; 2003; 2025
- Regional: 2002

The Northern Manitoba Blizzard are a junior ice hockey club and franchise of the Manitoba Junior Hockey League (MJHL). The team plays its home games at the Roy H. Johnston Arena in The Pas.

== History ==
The team was founded by the Opaskwayak Cree Nation as the OCN Blizzard in 1996. It was a year in the making with the Cree Nation's goal to enter the Saskatchewan Junior Hockey League (SJHL). Their hockey development and recreation department spent many months prior getting the community members on board through community meetings and house to house visits. Boh Kubrakovich, Jim Smith and Nathan McGillivary spent time working with the SJHL prior to entering their current league, the Manitoba Junior Hockey League (MJHL).

The Blizzard name and jersey was styled after the Utica Blizzard of the Colonial Hockey League. It was through a Blizzard like snow storm that the new directors of the team made it to Winnipeg to announce the team. During the press conference the directors decided to call the team the OCN (Opaskwayak Cree Nation) Blizzard.

Founding directors were James Smith, Chief Frances Flett, Gordon Lathlin, Gilbert Lathlin, Nathan McGillivary and recreation director/director of hockey Boh Kubrakovich. They selected Gardiner MacDougall as their first head coach and director of hockey. Leonard Strandberg was then hired as the general manager in 1996. Wayne Hawrysh was also a large contributor to the formation of the Club, acting over his tenure as a founder, governor, assistant coach, marketing director, and more.

From the 1998–99 season until 2002–03, the Blizzard became the second team in MJHL history and the first team in over sixty years to win five straight Turnbull Cup titles as MJHL playoff champions. At the ANAVET Cup regional tournament, in succession, the Blizzard lost to the SJHL's Estevan Bruins in 1999, to the Battlefords North Stars in 2000, the Weyburn Red Wings in 2001, defeated the Kindersley Klippers in 2002, and then lost in 2003 to the Humboldt Broncos. By winning the ANAVET Cup in 2002 the Blizzard earned them the right to compete in the 2002 Royal Bank Cup. They finished the Junior A national championship round-robin with a 2–2 record. In the semi-final OCN defeated the British Columbia Hockey League's Chilliwack Chiefs 4–3. They would go on to lose in the national final to the Halifax Exports 3–1.

In December 2016, the OCN council declared its intention to cease team operations following the 2016–17 season. The Blizzard board of directors were later granted permission to operate the team for another season, but without funding from the band council.

In 2018 a pair of businessmen, brothers Salman Safdar Dhillon and Usman Tahir Dhillon, jumped in to save the club. A proposal was presented in front of elected chief and council of Opaskwayak Cree Nation and it was unanimously approved and a sale agreement was signed. That sale was brought before the MJHL board of governors and after meeting a few more conditions was approved.

In 2024, the team was sold to Rob & Bonnie White, of The Pas, Manitoba, and the team name was changed to Northern Manitoba Blizzard.

Statistics
| Season | GP | W | L | T | T/OTL | Pts | GF | GA | Finish | Playoffs |
|---|---|---|---|---|---|---|---|---|---|---|
| 1996–97 | 55 | 32 | 18 | 4 | 1 | 274 | 228 | 69 | 2nd MJHL | Lost final |
| 1997–98 | 61 | 42 | 18 | 1 | 0 | 285 | 202 | 85 | 2nd MJHL | Lost semi-final |
| 1998–99 | 62 | 53 | 7 | 1 | 1 | 401 | 149 | 108 | 1st MJHL | Won league |
| 1999–00 | 64 | 44 | 16 | — | 4 | 305 | 194 | 92 | 1st MJHL | Won league |
| 2000–01 | 64 | 50 | 10 | — | 4 | 334 | 192 | 104 | 1st MJHL | Won league |
| 2001–02 | 64 | 56 | 6 | — | 3 | 379 | 149 | 115 | 1st MJHL | Won league, won ANAVET Cup |
| 2002–03 | 63 | 54 | 8 | — | 1 | 380 | 160 | 109 | 1st MJHL | Won league |
| 2003–04 | 64 | 46 | 10 | — | 8 | 355 | 177 | 100 | 1st MJHL | Lost quarter-final |
| 2004–05 | 63 | 29 | 22 | — | 12 | 221 | 221 | 70 | 5th MJHL | Lost quarter-final |
| 2005–06 | 63 | 37 | 17 | — | 9 | 232 | 181 | 83 | 2nd MJHL | Lost final |
| 2006–07 | 63 | 16 | 35 | — | 12 | 223 | 281 | 44 | 10th MJHL | Did not qualify |
| 2007–08 | 62 | 22 | 36 | — | 4 | 204 | 272 | 48 | 9th MJHL | Did not qualify |
| 2008–09 | 62 | 32 | 22 | — | 8 | 214 | 211 | 72 | 5th MJHL | Lost quarter-final |
| 2009–10 | 62 | 24 | 30 | — | 8 | 181 | 202 | 56 | 9th MJHL | Did not qualify |
| 2010–11 | 62 | 34 | 18 | — | 10 | 182 | 164 | 78 | 5th MJHL | Lost quarter-final |
| 2011–12 | 61 | 31 | 23 | — | 7 | 176 | 183 | 69 | 7th MJHL | Lost semi-final |
| 2012–13 | 60 | 39 | 16 | — | 5 | 226 | 193 | 83 | 3rd MJHL | Lost semi-final |
| 2013–14 | 60 | 21 | 34 | — | 5 | 171 | 235 | 47 | 8th MJHL | Lost quarter-final |
| 2014–15 | 60 | 20 | 35 | — | 5 | 167 | 203 | 45 | 10th MJHL | Lost survivor series |
| 2015–16 | 60 | 27 | 30 | — | 3 | 185 | 214 | 57 | 6th MJHL | Lost quarter-final |
| 2016–17 | 60 | 39 | 17 | — | 4 | 200 | 153 | 82 | 3rd MJHL | Lost final |
| 2017–18 | 60 | 32 | 20 | — | 8 | 209 | 192 | 72 | 4th MJHL | Lost quarter-final |
| 2018–19 | 60 | 18 | 40 | — | 2 | 153 | 258 | 38 | 10th MJHL | Did not qualify |
| 2019–20 | 60 | 16 | 39 | — | 5 | 158 | 251 | 37 | 10th MJHL | Did not qualify |
| 2020–21 | 6 | 1 | 4 | — | 1 | 23 | 32 | 3 | 11th MJHL | Cancelled |
| 2021–22 | 54 | 18 | 29 | — | 7 | 148 | 226 | 43 | 11th MJHL | Did not qualify |
| 2022-23 | 58 | 33 | 19 | - | 6 | 201 | 157 | 72 | 5th MJHL | Lost quarter-final |
| 2023–24 | 58 | 39 | 15 | 1 | 3 | 186 | 134 | 82 | 2nd of 6 West; 4th of 13 MJHL | Won Div Semifinal 4-3 (Dauphin Kings); Lost Semifinals 3-4 (Steinbach Pistons) |
| 2024–25 | 58 | 35 | 22 | 0 | 1 | 188 | 150 | 71 | 2nd of 6 West; 6th of 13 MJHL | Won Div Semifinal 4-1 (Neepawa Titans); Won league Semifinals 4-0 (Winkler Flyers); Won League Finals 4-3 (Dauphin Kings); ManJHL Champions; Advance to Centennial Cup |
| 2025–26 | 58 | 8 | 43 | 0 | 4 | 23 | 124 | 283 | 6th in division 13th overall | Did not qualify |

Source: "OCN Blizzard hockey team statistics and history". hockeydb.com.

=== Playoffs ===
- 1997 Lost final

OCN Blizzard defeated Portage Terriers 4-games-to-1
OCN Blizzard defeated Winkler Flyers 4-games-to-none
St. James Canadians defeated OCN Blizzard 4-games-to-1

- 1998 Lost semi-final

OCN Blizzard defeated Portage Terriers 4-games-to-2
Winkler Flyers defeated OCN Blizzard 4-games-to-1

- 1999 Won League, lost Anavet Cup

OCN Blizzard defeated Dauphin Kings 4-games-to-none
OCN Blizzard defeated Winkler Flyers 4-games-to-1
OCN Blizzard defeated Winnipeg South Blues 4-games-to-none MJHL CHAMPIONS
Estevan Bruins (SJHL) defeated OCN Blizzard 4-games-to-2

- 2000 Won League, lost Anavet Cup

OCN Blizzard defeated Swan Valley Stampeders
OCN Blizzard defeated Dauphin Kings 4-games-to-none
OCN Blizzard defeated Winnipeg South Blues 4-games-to-1 MJHL CHAMPIONS
Battlefords North Stars (SJHL) defeated OCN Blizzard 4-games-to-1

- 2001 Won League, lost Anavet Cup

OCN Blizzard defeated Swan Valley Stampeders 4-games-to-1
OCN Blizzard defeated Neepawa Natives 4-games-to-1
OCN Blizzard defeated Winkler Flyers 4-games-to-none MJHL CHAMPIONS
Weyburn Red Wings (SJHL) defeated OCN Blizzard 4-games-to-2

- 2002 Won League, won Anavet Cup, lost 2002 Royal Bank Cup final

OCN Blizzard defeated Swan Valley Stampeders 4-games-to-none
OCN Blizzard defeated Portage Terriers 4-games-to-3
OCN Blizzard defeated Winkler Flyers 4-games-to-none MJHL CHAMPIONS
OCN Blizzard defeated Kindersley Klippers (SJHL) 4-games-to-1 ANAVET CUP CHAMPIONS
Third in 2002 Royal Bank Cup round robin (2-2)
OCN Blizzard defeated Chilliwack Chiefs (BCHL) 4-3 in semi-final
Halifax Oland Exports (MJAHL) defeated OCN Blizzard 3-1 in final

- 2003 Won League, lost Anavet Cup

OCN Blizzard defeated Dauphin Kings 4-games-to-none
OCN Blizzard defeated Portage Terriers 4-games-to-1
OCN Blizzard defeated Southeast Blades 4-games-to-none MJHL CHAMPIONS
Humboldt Broncos (SJHL) defeated OCN Blizzard 4-games-to-1

- 2004 Lost quarter-final

Portage Terriers defeated OCN Blizzard 4-games-to-none

- 2005 Lost quarter-final

Portage Terriers defeated OCN Blizzard 4-games-to-2

- 2006 Lost final

OCN Blizzard defeated Swan Valley Stampeders 4-games-to-1
OCN Blizzard defeated Dauphin Kings 4-games-to-3
Winnipeg South Blues defeated OCN Blizzard 4-games-to-1

- 2009 Lost quarter-final

Dauphin Kings defeated OCN Blizzard 4-games-to-2

- 2011 Lost quarter-final

Dauphin Kings defeated OCN Blizzard 4-games-to-3

- 2012 Lost semi-final

OCN Blizzard defeated Swan Valley Stampeders 4-games-to-2
Winnipeg Saints defeated OCN Blizzard 4-games-to-2

- 2013 Lost semi-final

OCN Blizzard defeated Swan Valley Stampeders 4-games-to-1
Dauphin Kings defeated OCN Blizzard 4-games-to-3

- 2014 Lost quarter-final

OCN Blizzard defeated Waywayseecappo Wolverines 2-games-to-1
Dauphin Kings defeated OCN Blizzard 4-games-to-0

- 2015 Lost Survivor Series

Selkirk Steelers defeated OCN Blizzard 2-games-to-0

- 2016 Lost quarter-final

Winkler Flyers defeated OCN Blizzard 4-games-to-1

- 2017 Lost final

OCN Blizzard defeated Winnipeg Blues 4-games-to-1
OCN Blizzard defeated Winkler Flyers 4-games-to-0
Portage Terriers defeated OCN Blizzard 4-games-to-2

- 2018 Lost quarter-final

Winkler Flyers defeated OCN Blizzard 4-games-to-2

- 2019 DNQ
- 2020 DNQ
- 2021 Playoffs cancelled
- 2022 DNQ
- 2023 Lost quarter-final

Virden Oil Capitals defeated OCN Blizzard 4-games-to-2

== League and regional championships ==
| Championship | Years won |
|---|---|
| Turnbull Cup | 1999, 2000, 2001, 2002, 2003, 2025 |
| ANAVET Cup | 2002 |

== National championships ==
| Year | Round-robin | Record | Standing | Quarterfinal | Semifinal | Championship |
|---|---|---|---|---|---|---|
| 2025 | OTL, Trenton Golden Hawks (MJHL), 4-5; W, Greater Sudbury Cubs (NOJHL), 6-3; W, Kam River Fighting Walleye (SIJHL) 3-2; L, Grande Prairie Storm (AJHL), 3-6 | 2-0-1-1 | 2nd of 5 Pool A | Lost, 0-4; Rockland Nationals (CCHL) | Did not qualify | Did not qualify |

== Retired numbers ==
- #10 Gary Constant Jr.
- #18 Cliff Duschesne
- #22 Terence Tootoo

== Notable alumni ==
Many players have used the OCN Blizzard as a stepping stone into a career in the professional leagues across Canada, the United States, and Europe.

| Name | Team(s) |
| Ryan Constant | Hartford Wolfpack (AHL) |
| Josh Elmes | Rapid City Rush (ECHL) |
| Derek Ernest | Wheeling Nailers (ECHL) |
| Andrew Gallant | Elmira Jackals (ECHL) |
| Mike Gooch | Wheeling Nailers (ECHL) |
| Kristjan Jefkins | Victoria Salmon Kings (ECHL)/Amsterdam Tijgers (BeNe League) |
| Darcy Johnson | Long Beach Ice Dogs (ECHL) |
| Brady Keeper | Florida Panthers (NHL) |
| Charles Lachance | Tulsa Oilers (ECHL) |
| Steve MacIntyre | Edmonton Oilers (NHL) |
| Jon Mirasty | Syracuse Crunch (AHL)/HC Vityaz (KHL) |
| Konrad McKay | Bridgeport Sound Tigers (AHL) |
| Chris Murphy | Greenville Grrrowl (ECHL) |
| Jamie Muswagon | Wheeling Nailers (ECHL) |
| Mike Ouellet | Long Beach Ice Dogs (ECHL)/VisbyRoma |
| Ryan Person | Greenville Grrrowl (ECHL) |
| Russell Spence | Greenville Grrrowl (ECHL)/RT Bad Nauheim |
| Jordin Tootoo | Chicago Blackhawks (NHL) |
| Terence Tootoo | Roanoke Express (ECHL) |
| Dale Warkentin | Bakersfield Condors (ECHL) |
| Wally Wuttunee | Wheeling Nailers (ECHL) |

== See also ==
- List of ice hockey teams in Manitoba
- Manitoba Junior Hockey League
- Hockey Manitoba
