= 2002 Royal Bank Cup =

Tournament details
- Venue: Halifax Forum in Halifax, Nova Scotia
- Dates: May 4, 2002 – May 12, 2002
- Teams: 5

Final positions
- Champions: Halifax Oland Exports (1st title)
- Runners-up: OCN Blizzard

Tournament statistics
- Games played: 13
- Scoring leader: Jeff Tambellini (Chilliwack)

Awards
- MVP: Jeff Tambellini (Chilliwack)

The 2002 Royal Bank Cup is the 32nd Junior "A" 2002 ice hockey National Championship for the Canadian Junior A Hockey League.

The Royal Bank Cup was competed for by the winners of the Doyle Cup, Anavet Cup, Dudley Hewitt Cup, the Fred Page Cup and a host city.

The tournament will be hosted by the Halifax Oland Exports in Halifax, Nova Scotia.

== The Playoffs ==
=== Round Robin ===
Pos	League (Ticket)	Team	Pld	W	L	GF	GA	GD	Qualification
1	MJAHL (Host)	Halifax Exports	4	4	0	16	10	+6	Semi-final
2	BCHL (Doyle Cup)	Chilliwack Chiefs	4	3	1	25	14	+11	Semi-final
3	MJHL (Anavet Cup)	OCN Blizzard	4	2	2	17	15	+2	Semi-final
4	CJHL (Fred Page Cup)	Ottawa Jr. Senators	4	1	3	11	14	−3	Semi-final
5	NOJHL (Dudley Hewitt Cup)	Rayside-Balfour Sabrecats	4	0	4	8	24	−16	

==== Results ====
Halifax Exports defeat Chilliwack Chiefs 4-3 in Overtime
Ottawa Jr. Senators defeat Rayside-Balfour Sabrecats 4-3
Halifax Exports defeat OCN Blizzard 4-3 in Overtime
Chilliwack Chiefs defeat Rayside-Balfour Sabrecats 9-2
OCN Blizzard defeat Ottawa Jr. Senators 4-3 in Overtime
Halifax Exports defeat Ottawa Jr. Senators 2-1
Chilliwack Chiefs defeat OCN Blizzard 8-5
Halifax Exports defeat Rayside-Balfour Sabrecats 6-3
OCN Blizzard defeat Rayside-Balfour Sabrecats 5-0
Chilliwack Chiefs defeat Ottawa Jr. Senators 5-3

=== Semi and Finals ===
Semi-finals
1	Halifax Oland Exports	9
4	Ottawa Jr. Senators	7
2	Chilliwack Chiefs	3
3	OCN Blizzard	4

Royal Bank Cup Finals
1	Halifax Oland Exports	3
3	OCN Blizzard	1

== Awards ==
Most Valuable Player: Jeff Tambellini (Chilliwack Chiefs)
Top Scorer: Jeff Tambellini (Chilliwack Chiefs)
Most Sportsmanlike Player: Jason Snow (Halifax Oland Exports)
Top Goalie: Scott Gouthro (Halifax Oland Exports)
Top Forward: Matt Quinn (Halifax Oland Exports)
Top Defenceman: Jeff Barlow (Chilliwack Chiefs)

== Roll of League Champions ==
AJHL: Drayton Valley Thunder
BCHL: Chilliwack Chiefs
CJHL: Ottawa Jr. Senators
MJHL: OCN Blizzard
MJAHL: Halifax Oland Exports
NOJHL: Rayside-Balfour Sabrecats
OPJHL: Brampton Capitals
QJAAAHL: Valleyfield Braves
SJHL: Kindersley Klippers
SIJHL: Dryden Ice Dogs

== See also ==
- Canadian Junior A Hockey League
- Royal Bank Cup
- Anavet Cup
- Doyle Cup
- Dudley Hewitt Cup
- Fred Page Cup
