= Neepawa Titans =

Manitoba ice hockey team

- City: Neepawa, Manitoba
- League: Manitoba Junior Hockey League
- Division: West
- Founded: 1989
- Home arena: Yellowhead Centre
- Colours: Black, Gold, Silver
- General manager: Ken Pearson
- Head coach: Ken Pearson

Franchise history
- 1989–2021: Neepawa Natives
- 2021–present: Neepawa Titans

The Neepawa Titans (formerly the Neepawa Natives) are a Canadian Junior "A" ice hockey team from Neepawa, Manitoba. They are members of the Manitoba Junior Hockey League (MJHL), a part of the Canadian Junior Hockey League, and play home games at the Yellowhead Centre.

== History ==
=== Neepawa Natives (1989–2021) ===
Neepawa Natives logo (1989–2020)

Neepawa's MJHL team was founded in 1989 as the Neepawa Natives. The creation of the original team name was rooted in the early 1960s, with the then-named Neepawa Intermediates hockey team. In 1963, Ron Guinn and Cecil Pittman suggested the Neepawa Intermediates should create an actual team name for the Neepawa-based hockey club. A name that would connect to Neepawa (a Cree name meaning abundance or plenty) was explored. The name 'Natives' was selected because Neepawa and Natives both start with the letter 'N', and were seven letters long, which led Pittman and Guinn to believe it was a good fit for the team. They were also influenced by the many sports teams, throughout all of North America, that already had logos and team names that were Native American-themed. For example, the Cleveland Indians took their name in 1915. Scores of North American high schools and colleges also adopted Native American-themed team names and logos in the 1920s and 1930s.

The name would go on to be used by the intermediate team, who would play in the Inter Ridge Hockey League, the Central Plains Hockey League and the South West Hockey League in the 1960s and 1970s. In 1989, Neepawa was accepted into the MJHL and was in need of creating its own team name and identity. Wanting to respect the hockey history created by that Neepawa Intermediates team, it was decided to use the Natives name for the community's new Junior 'A' Hockey club. The Natives name was gradually adopted by Neepawa Minor Hockey for its youth teams.

The Neepawa Natives had many successful seasons reaching the MJHL Finals in 1996 and the meeting in the division finals seven times.

==== Hazing incident ====
In October 2011, a 15-year-old player came forward with allegations of sexual-based rookie hazing within the team's locker room. The victim's mother said her son was forced to walk around the team locker room with a set of water bottles tied to his scrotum and that assistant coach Brad Biggers was allegedly present in the dressing room at the time. As a result, the Royal Canadian Mounted Police opened an investigation of the incident and the MJHL hired an independent investigator to look into the incident.

Following its investigation, the MJHL levied a record $5000 fine against the team and a total of 18 suspensions to team players and personnel, as well an indefinite suspension to Biggers, preventing him from coaching for any team affiliated with Hockey Canada. Head coach and general manager Bryant Perrier, who initially reported the incident to the league, left his post shortly thereafter and also received an indefinite ban from the MJHL (which has since been rescinded). The team later issued an apology to the hazing victims, its staff, sponsors, fans, and local community. No criminal charges were laid by the RCMP.

=== Neepawa Titans (2021–present) ===
In July 2020, the team announced the intention to change its name and logo in response to growing pressure for sports teams to remove names and logos considered offensive to Indigenous peoples. The team's new name (Neepawa Titans) and logo, inspired by the Vegas Golden Knights theme, were unveiled in June 2021. Among the other nicknames considered were the Bulls, Thunder, Salt Dogs and Generals.

== Season-by-season record ==
Note: GP = games played, W = wins, L = losses, T = ties, OTL = overtime losses, GF = goals for, GA = goals against, DNQ = did not qualify

Season	GP	W	L	T	OTL	GF	GA	Points	Finish	Playoffs
1989–90	52	10	42	0	-	240	291	20	9th MJHL	
1990–91	48	12	34	2	-	212	331	26	8th MJHL	
1991–92	48	15	31	1	1	198	252	32	8th MJHL	
1992–93	49	21	25	2	1	222	206	45	6th MJHL	
1993–94	56	27	25	2	2	–	–	58	5th MJHL	
1994–95	56	32	20	2	2	237	218	68	2nd MJHL	
1995–96	56	28	22	4	2	248	241	62	5th MJHL	
1996–97	55	23	30	1	1	242	280	48	7th MJHL	
1997–98	60	28	29	3	0	264	272	59	6th MJHL	
1998–99	62	12	49	0	1	187	360	25	10th MJHL	
1999–00	64	30	30	-	4	244	270	64	10th MJHL	
2000–01	64	41	20	-	3	286	246	85	3rd MJHL	
2001–02	64	40	20	-	4	271	221	84	4th MJHL	
2002–03	64	28	30	-	6	286	300	62	9th MJHL	
2003–04	64	37	18	-	9	236	193	83	3rd MJHL	
2004–05	63	37	18	-	8	251	194	82	2nd MJHL	
2005–06	63	14	41	-	8	179	269	36	10th MJHL	DNQ
2006–07	63	41	19	-	3	266	220	85	4th MJHL	Lost semi-final
2007–08	62	16	40	-	6	172	288	38	10th MJHL	DNQ
2008–09	61	24	29	-	8	182	237	56	8th MJHL	Lost quarter-final
2009–10	62	34	24	-	4	205	189	72	6th MJHL	Lost quarter-final
2010–11	62	24	32	-	6	170	208	54	9th MJHL	DNQ
2011–12	61	12	45	-	4	168	289	28	11th MJHL	DNQ
2012-13	60	13	40	-	7	143	293	33	11th MJHL	DNQ
2013–14	60	14	41	-	5	149	274	33	11th MJHL	DNQ
2014–15	60	15	42	-	3	141	255	33	11th MJHL	DNQ
2015–16	60	13	45	-	2	132	312	28	11th MJHL	DNQ
2016–17	60	21	33	-	6	173	229	48	8th MJHL	Lost quarter-final
2017–18	60	25	31	-	4	215	250	54	9th MJHL	DNQ
2018–19	60	9	43	-	8	130	264	26	11th MJHL	DNQ
2019–20	60	13	43	-	4	137	246	30	11th MJHL	DNQ
2020–21	10	2	6	-	2	23	38	6	10th MJHL	Cancelled
Neepawa Titans
2021–22	54	19	26	-	9	178	222	47	10th MJHL	DNQ
2022-23	58	22	27	-	9	181	206	53	10th MJHL	DNQ
2023–24	58	28	29	1	0	194	201	57	4th of 6 West; 9th of 13 MJHL	Lost Div Semifinals 2-4 (Virden Oil Capitals)
2024–25	58	32	21	2	3	196	189	69	3rd of 6 West; 7th of 13 MJHL	Lost Div Semifinals 1-4 (Northern Manitoba Blizzard)

=== Playoffs ===
- 1990 DNQ
- 1991 Lost quarter-final
  Winnipeg South Blues defeated Neepawa Natives 4-games-to-none
- 1992 Lost quarter-final
  St. James Canadians defeated Neepawa Natives 4-games-to-1
- 1993 Lost quarter-final
  Portage Terriers defeated Neepawa Natives 4-games-to-none
- 1994 Lost quarter-final
  Dauphin Kings defeated Neepawa Natives 4-games-to-2
- 1995 Lost semi-final
  Neepawa Natives defeated Portage Terriers 4-games-to-none
  Winkler Flyers defeated Neepawa Natives 4-games-to-3
- 1996 Lost final
  Neepawa Natives defeated Portage Terriers 4-games-to-3
  Neepawa Natives defeated Dauphin Kings 4-games-to-2
  St. James Canadians defeated Neepawa Natives 4-games-to-3
- 1997 Lost quarter-final
  Winkler Flyers defeated Neepawa Natives 4-games-to-3
- 1998 Lost quarter-final
  Winkler Flyers defeated Neepawa Natives 4-games-to-1
- 1999 DNQ
- 2000 DNQ
- 2001 Lost semi-final
  Neepawa Natives defeated Portage Terriers 4-games-to-3
  OCN Blizzard defeated Neepawa Natives 4-games-to-1
- 2002 Lost quarter-final
  Portage Terriers defeated Neepawa Natives 4-games-to-1
- 2003 DNQ
- 2004 Lost quarter-final
  Swan Valley Stampeders defeated Neepawa Natives 4-games-to-2
- 2005 Lost semi-final
  Neepawa Natives defeated Dauphin Kings 4-games-to-2
  Portage Terriers defeated Neepawa Natives 4-games-to-1
- 2006 DNQ
- 2007 Lost semi-final
  Neepawa Natives defeated Portage Terriers 4-games-to-3
  Dauphin Kings defeated Neepawa Natives 4-games-to-2
- 2008 DNQ
- 2009 Lost quarter-final
  Winnipeg Saints defeated Neepawa Natives 4-games-to-none
- 2010 Lost quarter-final
  Dauphin Kings defeated Neepawa Natives 4-games-to-none
- 2011 DNQ
- 2012 DNQ
- 2013 DNQ
- 2014 DNQ
- 2015 DNQ
- 2016 DNQ
- 2017 Lost quarter-final
  Steinbach Pistons defeated Neepawa Natives 4-games-to-2
- 2018 DNQ
- 2019 DNQ
- 2020 DNQ
- 2021 Playoffs cancelled
- 2022 DNQ
- 2023 DNQ

== Players ==
People who have played for the Neepawa Titans or Neepawa Natives include:

- Matt Bailey
- Morgan Geekie
- Triston Grant
- Shane Hnidy
- Mark Kolesar
- Patrick Köppchen
- Peter Leboutillier
- Riley Weselowski

== See also ==
- List of ice hockey teams in Manitoba
- Manitoba Junior Hockey League
- Hockey Manitoba
