= Konrad McKay =

Canadian ice hockey player

- Born: December 15, 1979 (age 46) Wabowden, Manitoba, Canada
- Height: 5 ft 11 in (180 cm)
- Weight: 190 lb (86 kg; 13 st 8 lb)
- Position: Centre
- Shot: Left
- Played for: AHL; Hartford Wolf Pack; Bridgeport Sound Tigers; WPHL; Odessa Jackalopes; ECHL; Charlotte Checkers; CHL; New Mexico Scorpions; LNAH; Verdun Dragons; Trois-Rivières Caron & Guay
- Playing career: 2000–2009

Konrad McKay (born December 15, 1979) is a Canadian former professional ice hockey player. Between 2001 and 2004 he played 170 games in the ECHL with the Charlotte Checkers.

== Awards and honours ==
Award	Year
Mike Ridley Trophy – MJHL leading scorer	1998–99
