= Virden Oil Capitals =

Junior ice hockey club

- City: Virden, Manitoba
- League: MJHL
- Division: West
- Founded: 2012
- Home arena: Tundra Oil & Gas Place
- Colors
- Owner: Virden Hockey Ventures Inc.
- General manager: Tyson Ramsey
- Head coach: Tyson Ramsey
- Website: oilcapshockey.com

Franchise history
- 1956–1957: Winnipeg Rangers
- 1957–1958: Brandon Rangers
- 1958–1959: Transcona Rangers
- 1959–1967: Winnipeg Rangers
- 1967–2000: St. Boniface Saints
- 2000–2012: Winnipeg Saints
- Since 2012: Virden Oil Capitals

The Virden Oil Capitals are a junior ice hockey club in the Manitoba Junior Hockey League (MJHL). The team plays its home games at the Tundra Oil & Gas Place arena in Virden, Manitoba.

== History ==
In 2012, the club formerly known as the Winnipeg Saints relocated to Virden and was rebranded as the Virden Oil Capitals following a change in ownership.

The team has won five Turnbull Cups (Rangers in 1961 and 1966; Saints in 1971, 1981, and 1994) and finished runner-up on seven occasions (Rangers in 1960; Saints in 1969, 1993, 2008, 2010, and 2012; Oil Capitals in 2018).

Statistics
| Season | GP | W | L | T | OTL | GF | GA | Pts | Regular season | Post-season |
|---|---|---|---|---|---|---|---|---|---|---|
| 2012–13 | 60 | 18 | 34 | 0 | 8 | 159 | 217 | 44 | 10th overall | Did not qualify |
| 2013–14 | 60 | 32 | 24 | 0 | 4 | 202 | 179 | 68 | 5th overall | Won quarterfinal against Swan Valley (4:2); Lost semifinal against Dauphin (4:0) |
| 2014–15 | 60 | 30 | 20 | 0 | 10 | 202 | 191 | 70 | 5th overall | Won quarterfinal against Winkler (4:2); Lost semifinal against Portage (4:0) |
| 2015–16 | 60 | 37 | 21 | 0 | 2 | 195 | 141 | 76 | 4th overall | Lost quarterfinal against Winnipeg Blues (4:3) |
| 2016–17 | 60 | 26 | 26 | 0 | 8 | 167 | 198 | 60 | 7th overall | Lost quarterfinal against Winkler (4:2) |
| 2017–18 | 60 | 40 | 17 | 0 | 3 | 268 | 181 | 83 | 2nd overall | Won quarterfinal against Selkirk (4:1); Won semifinal against Winkler (4:0); Lost final against Steinbach (4:2) |
| 2018–19 | 60 | 31 | 21 | 0 | 8 | 214 | 196 | 70 | 5th overall | Won quarterfinal against Selkirk (4:2); Lost semifinal against Portage (4:0) |
| 2019–20 | 60 | 32 | 23 | 0 | 5 | 233 | 218 | 69 | 6th overall | Cancelled |
| 2020–21 | 9 | 8 | 0 | 0 | 1 | 39 | 24 | 17 | 1st overall | Cancelled |
| 2021–22 | 54 | 30 | 20 | 0 | 4 | 203 | 183 | 64 | 5th overall | Won quarterfinal against Waywayseecappo (4:0); Lost semifinal against Steinbach (4:2) |
| 2022–23 | 58 | 35 | 22 | 0 | 1 | 182 | 185 | 71 | 6th overall | Won quarterfinal against OCN Blizzard (4:2); Won semifinal against Portage (4:3); Lost final against Steinbach (4:1) |
| 2023–24 | 58 | 40 | 12 | 3 | 3 | 229 | 134 | 86 | 1st in division 3rd overall | Won quarterfinal against Neepawa (4:2); Lost semifinal against Winkler (4:2) |
| 2024–25 | 58 | 24 | 31 | 2 | 1 | 170 | 189 | 51 | 5th in division 10 overall | Did not qualify |
| 2025–26 | 58 | 39 | 14 | 0 | 3 | 257 | 156 | 83 | 1st in division 3rd overall | Won quarterfinal against Neepawa (4:0); Won semifinal against Steinbach (4:2); Lost final against Niverville (4:0) |

Source: "Virden Oil Capitals hockey team statistics and history". hockeydb.com.
