= Swan Valley Stampeders =

Junior ice hockey club

- City: Swan River, Manitoba
- League: MJHL
- Division: West
- Founded: 1999
- Home arena: Centennial Arena
- Colours
- General manager: Joshua Tripp
- Head coach: Joshua Tripp
- Website: stampedershockey.com

The Swan Valley Stampeders are a junior ice hockey club in the Manitoba Junior Hockey League (MJHL). The team plays its home games at the Centennial Arena in Swan River, Manitoba.

== Season-by-season record ==
Statistics
Season	GP	W	L	T	OTL	GF	GA	Pts	Regular season	Post-season
1999–00	64	31	31	0	2	209	237	64	9th overall	
2000–01	64	32	26	0	6	237	233	70	5th overall	
2001–02	64	34	20	0	10	272	203	78	5th overall	
2002–03	64	43	13	0	8	301	218	94	4th overall	
2003–04	64	36	22	0	6	255	224	78	4th overall	
2004–05	63	30	28	0	5	210	230	65	9th overall	
2005–06	63	31	21	0	11	230	204	73	7th overall	Lost quarterfinal
2006–07	63	19	37	0	7	203	282	45	9th overall	Did not qualify
2007–08	62	25	28	0	9	219	273	59	8th overall	
2008–09	61	18	39	0	4	165	260	40	9th overall	
2009–10	62	34	22	0	6	232	228	74	4th overall	Lost semifinal
2010–11	62	33	23	0	6	178	187	72	6th overall	Lost quarterfinal
2011–12	62	27	27	0	8	204	222	62	8th overall	Lost quarterfinal
2012–13	60	33	23	0	4	227	224	70	4th overall	Lost quarterfinal
2013–14	60	27	30	0	3	208	242	57	7th overall	Lost quarterfinal
2014–15	60	28	26	0	6	176	198	62	6th overall	Lost quarterfinal
2015–16	60	22	29	0	9	174	237	53	7th overall	Lost quarterfinal
2016–17	60	20	34	0	6	160	236	48	9th overall	Did not qualify
2017–18	60	28	25	0	7	206	206	63	8th overall	Lost quarterfinal
2018–19	60	42	13	0	5	251	167	89	2nd overall	Lost final
2019–20	60	35	17	0	6	222	186	76	4th overall	Cancelled
2020–21	9	5	4	0	0	41	37	4	6th overall	Cancelled
2021–22	54	22	27	0	5	169	192	49	9th overall	Lost quarterfinal
2022–23	58	36	16	0	6	223	176	78	3rd overall	Lost semifinal
2023–24	58	11	44	3	0	143	256	25	6th in division 11th overall	Did not qualify
2024–25	58	17	34	5	2	170	252	41	6th in division 11th overall	Did not qualify
2025–26	58	20	33	0	3	173	255	45	5th in division 9th overall	Did not qualify

Source: "Swan Valley Stampeders hockey team statistics and history". hockeydb.com.

=== Playoffs ===
- 2000 Lost quarterfinal

OCN Blizzard defeated Swan Valley Stampeders

- 2001 Lost quarterfinal

OCN Blizzard defeated Swan Valley Stampeders 4-games-to-1

- 2002 Lost quarterfinal

OCN Blizzard defeated Swan Valley Stampeders 4-games-to-none

- 2003 Lost quarterfinal

Portage Terriers defeated Swan Valley Stampeders 4-games-to-3

- 2004 Lost semifinal

Swan Valley Stampeders defeated Neepawa Natives 4-games-to-2
Portage Terriers defeated Swan Valley Stampeders 4-games-to-2

- 2005 DNQ
- 2006 Lost quarterfinal

OCN Blizzard defeated Swan Valley Stampeders 4-games-to-1

- 2007 DNQ
- 2008 Lost quarterfinal

Portage Terriers defeated Swan Valley Stampeders 4-games-to-3

- 2009 DNQ
- 2010 Lost semifinal

Swan Valley Stampeders defeated Portage Terriers 4-games-to-1
Dauphin Kings defeated Swan Valley Stampeders 4-games-to-1

- 2011 Lost quarterfinal

Portage Terriers defeated Swan Valley Stampeders 4-games-to-2

- 2012 Lost quarterfinal

OCN Blizzard defeated Swan Valley Stampeders 4-games-to-1

- 2013 Lost quarterfinal

OCN Blizzard defeated Swan Valley Stampeders 4-games-to-1

- 2014 Lost quarterfinal

Virden Oil Capitals defeated Swan Valley Stampeders 4-games-to-1

- 2015 Lost quarterfinal

Swan Valley Stampeders defeated Dauphin Kings 2-games-to-0
Winnipeg Blues defeated Swan Valley Stampeders 4-games-to-0

- 2016 Lost quarterfinal

Swan Valley Stampeders defeated Waywayseecappo Wolverines 2-games-to-0
Steinbach Pistons defeated Swan Valley Stampeders 4-games-to-0

- 2017 DNQ
- 2018 Lost quarterfinal

Steinbach Pistons defeated Swan Valley Stampeders 4-games-to-0

- 2019 Lost final

Swan Valley Stampeders defeated Dauphin Kings 4-games-to-0
Swan Valley Stampeders defeated Steinbach Pistons 4-games-to-2
Portage Terriers defeated Swan Valley Stampeders 4-games-to-3

- 2020 Playoffs cancelled

Swan Valley Stampeders leading Waywayseecappo Wolverines 2-games-to-1 when playoffs were cancelled due to COVID-19 pandemic

- 2021 Playoffs cancelled
- 2022 Lost quarterfinal

Dauphin Kings defeated Swan Valley Stampeders 4-games-to-2

- 2023 Lost semifinal

Swan Valley Stampeders defeated Dauphin Kings 4-games-to-2
Steinbach Pistons defeated Swan Valley Stampeders 4-games-to-2

== See also ==
- List of ice hockey teams in Manitoba
- Manitoba Junior Hockey League
- Hockey Manitoba
