= Mike Ridley Trophy =

The Mike Ridley Trophy is awarded to the player who leads the Manitoba Junior Hockey League in points scoring during the regular season. The trophy is named after former National Hockey League star Mike Ridley, who holds the MJHL single season scoring records for points (191) and goals (91), which were set with the St. Boniface Saints during the 1982–83 season.

The current trophy was first awarded in 2003, replacing the Selkirk Steelers Trophy previous awarded to the scoring champion.

== MJHL Scoring Champions ==
CJHL Leaders highlined

Season	Winner	Team	GP	Goals	Assists	Points
2009	Dan Watt	Winnipeg Saints	60	62	74	136
2008	Bryan Kauk	Dauphin Kings	54	46	72	118
2007	Kyle Howarth	Selkirk Steelers	58	38	103	141
2006	Joey Moggach	Dauphin Kings	63	55	63	118
2005	A.J. Tucker	Waywayseecappo Wolverines	62	27	55	82
2004	Aaron Starr	OCN Blizzard	60	59	59	118
2001	Lee Stubbs	Winnipeg Saints	63	43	67	110
1999	Konrad McKay	OCN Blizzard	NA	NA	NA	NA
1998	Jedd Crumb	Winnipeg South Blues	61	61	51	112
1997	Chris Thomas	Winkler Flyers	NA	NA	NA	NA
1995	Cory Cyrenne	St. Boniface Saints	54	35	77	112
1994	Ryan Smith	St. James Canadians	50	58	67	125
1992	Jamie Penner	Winkler Flyers	NA	NA	NA	NA
1985	Brian Thompson	Dauphin Kings	NA	53	57	110
1983	Mike Ridley	St. Boniface Saints	48	91	100	191
1981	Darren Boyko	St. Boniface Saints	48	48	68	116
1977	Ken Krentz	Selkirk Steelers	51	35	93	128
1976	Ken Krentz	Selkirk Steelers	52	45	61	109
1975	Jim Misener	Dauphin Kings	47	73	62	135
1974	Steve Ford	Portage Terriers	43	33	58	91
1973	Charlie Simmer	Kenora Muskies	48	43	68	111
1972	Kim Murphy	Kenora Muskies	41	40	51	91
1971	Dan Tremblay	Dauphin Kings	48	37	72	109
1970	Ken George	Kenora Muskies	NA	39	41	80
1969	Dennis Schick	Dauphin Kings	34	34	50	84
1968	Wayne Chernecki	West Kildonan North Stars	NA	42	35	77
1967	Bobby Clarke	Flin Flon Bombers	45	71	112	183
1966	Terry Jones	Winnipeg Rangers	NA	43	48	91
1965	Ken Sucharski	Winnipeg Rangers	45	35	37	72
1964	John Vopni	Brandon Wheat Kings	30	35	35	70
1963	Bob Stoyko	Brandon Wheat Kings	39	28	40	68
1962	Gerry Kell	Brandon Wheat Kings	40	29	53	82
1961	George Hill	Brandon Wheat Kings	NA	45	38	83
1960	George Hill	Brandon Wheat Kings	30	31	31	62
1959	Laurie Langrell	Winnipeg Braves	NA	42	21	63
1958	Gord Labossiere	Transcona Rangers	30	44	35	79
1957	Ray Brunel	St. Boniface Canadiens	30	57	48	105
1956	Ray Brunel	St. Boniface Canadiens	NA	NA	NA	NA
1955	Art Stratton	Winnipeg Barons	32	50	26	76
1955	Gordon Stratton	Winnipeg Barons	NA	39	37	76
1954	Ab McDonald	St. Boniface Canadiens	35	33	25	58
1953	Ross Jones	Brandon Wheat Kings	NA	31	26	57
1952	Del Topoll	Brandon Wheat Kings	NA	24	28	52
1951	Ron Rohmer	Brandon Wheat Kings	NA	37	36	73
1950	Reg Abbott	Brandon Wheat Kings	36	27	27	54
1949	Bill McCracken	Winnipeg Monarchs	NA	NA	NA	NA
1948	Odie Lowe	Winnipeg Canadiens	NA	23	28	51
1947	Ray Manson	Winnipeg Rangers	16	22	19	41
1946	Don Raleigh	Brandon Elks	10	24	24	48
1943	Mike Yaschuk	St. Boniface Athletics	NA	NA	NA	NA
1942	Lin Bend	Portage Terriers	17	27	31	58
1940	Bill Benson	Winnipeg Monarchs	24	19	20	39
1938	Terry Reardon	Brandon Wheat Kings	16	29	16	45
1937	William Meronek	Portage Terriers	16	21	20	41
1935	Babe Pratt	Kenora Thistles	18	19	23	42
1934	Babe Pratt	Kenora Thistles	16	14	7	21
1933	Bryan Hextall	Portage Terriers	12	10	8	18
