= COVID-19 pandemic in Manitoba =

Ongoing COVID-19 viral pandemic in Manitoba, Canada

- Disease: COVID-19
- Pathogen: SARS-CoV-2
- Location: Manitoba, Canada
- First outbreak: Wuhan, Hubei, China
- Index case: Winnipeg
- Arrival date: March 12, 2020 (6 years, 3 months, 3 weeks and 6 days)
- Confirmed cases: 56,482
- Active cases: 1,022
- Recovered: 54309
- Deaths: 1,151
- Fatality rate: 2.08%

Government website
- Government of Manitoba

The COVID-19 pandemic in Manitoba is a viral pandemic of coronavirus disease 2019 (COVID-19), a novel infectious disease caused by severe acute respiratory syndrome coronavirus 2 (SARS-CoV-2).

Manitoba officially reported its first cases on March 12, 2020. A state of emergency was declared on March 20, and implemented its first lockdown on April 1—ordering the closure of all non-essential businesses. In comparison to other provinces, case counts remained relatively low in Manitoba throughout the spring and summer months, and the province began lifting some of its health orders on May 4. Some isolated outbreaks occurred in communal Hutterite colonies and in the Brandon, Manitoba area in late-July and August respectively.

By September 2020, the province had begun to develop a harsher second wave, which led to restrictions being reimplemented in parts of the province (including the city of Winnipeg), and by November 12, all of Manitoba being placed under the highest, "Critical" (red) level of the province's tier-based response system, which reintroduced strong restrictions on gatherings and non-essential activities similar to the first wave.

While some restrictions were eased in early-2021 while remaining under the Critical tier, strong restrictions on gatherings, retail capacity, and specific non-essential sectors of businesses were reintroduced in May 2021 due to a harsher third wave of COVID-19 fuelled by variants of SARS-CoV-2. The province's healthcare system was overwhelmed, which required it to send some of its COVID-19 intensive care patients to neighbouring provinces, and seek federal aid. By June 2021, the province had begun to lift some of its restrictions due to vaccination progress. However, due to Omicron variant, the province began to reintroduce restrictions on gatherings in late-2021. These restrictions were phased out in February and March 2022.

== Timeline ==
=== March–April 2020 ===
On March 12, 2020, Manitoba Health reported three presumptive cases of COVID-19, all among residents of Winnipeg that had recently returned from travel.

Officials initially announced the first probable case that could not be linked to travel or contact with known patients on March 18, but the case was later determined to be a false positive. On March 20, a state of emergency was issued by Premier Brian Pallister, which implemented enforceable restrictions on gatherings and business sectors. The province reported its first death from COVID-19 on March 27. The first two recoveries were reported on March 29.

The province confirmed on April 1 that they had seen evidence of community transmission in Winnipeg. On April 2, officials announced that a worker at a personal care home in Gimli had tested positive, and that nine residents were showing symptoms of respiratory illness, but later confirmed on April 5 that the worker's case was a false positive.

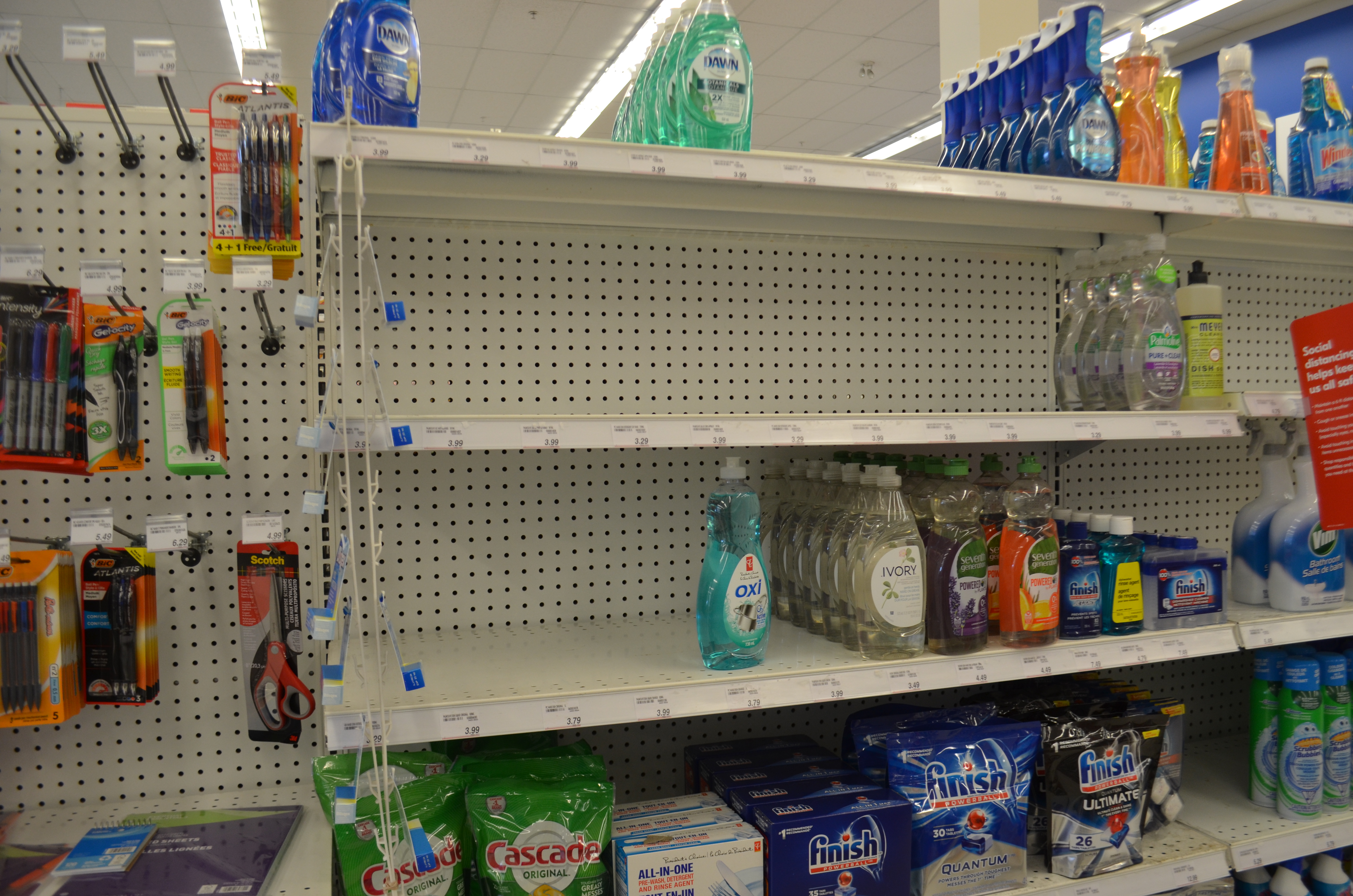
Shelves void of disinfectant and sanitizer in a Winnipeg supermarket.

An incident at the Health Sciences Centre in Winnipeg exposed numerous employees to the virus, including nurses, doctors, therapists, health care aides, and security guards. By April 3, approximately 100 HSC employees had been required to isolate themselves. Following the event, four nurses at the HSC had tested positive for COVID-19, as well as health care workers at Saint Boniface Hospital and Grace Hospital in Winnipeg, a hospital in Selkirk, and a personal care home in the St. Vital area of Winnipeg.

By April 5, Manitoba reached 200 confirmed cases. On April 16, the province stated that about 56% of the 250 known cases were directly linked to travel. The number of daily new cases diminished through mid-April, and on April 17, the province announced that the number of known recoveries from COVID-19 had overtaken the number of known cases in Manitoba.

On April 29, Premier Pallister announced that the province would begin a phased lifting of restrictions beginning May 4, beginning with outdoor recreation, retail businesses, patio restaurants, non-urgent healthcare, day-camps, libraries, galleries, and museums. He emphasized that this would not be a "return to normal", but told residents that "You stuck to the fundamentals, and those fundamentals are what will take us forward. But this isn't a victory lap. Today is a celebration because of what you've done and tomorrow will be a celebration because of what you'll continue to do."

The province's Chief Public Health Officer Brent Roussin stated based on modelling, that Manitoba had 666 fewer confirmed cases as of April 25 than it would have had without public health measures.

=== May–June 2020 ===
In May, the number of new cases continued to decline, with 13 reported in the first 27 days of the month, and only 6 new cases reported after May 12. On May 23, the province announced that there were no COVID-19 patients remaining in the province's hospitals.

In July, a spike of new clusters began to emerge in Manitoba, centred primarily among communal Hutterite colonies. Representatives of the colonies criticized health officials for publicly linking them to these outbreaks, as they were facing stigmatization from the public as a result. The province announced on July 25 that it would no longer publicly link outbreaks to colonies unless they pose a risk to the general public. On July 28, the province reported its first new death from the virus since May 5.

On August 5, an employee of a Maple Leaf Foods facility in Brandon was reported to have tested positive for COVID-19. The next day, the province announced its second-largest increase in daily new cases since the pandemic began, with a cluster of 18 cases being connected to the facility, although transmission was reported to not be occurring within the facility itself. This cluster grew to 64 cases on August 8, which the province announced had developed into community spread within Brandon. By August 12, Manitoba's active case count surpassed 200 for the first time since the pandemic began.

On August 19, the province announced "RestartMB", a colour-coded response system that would classify risks and restrictions on a regional basis. The province was initially placed under the yellow "Caution" tier. On August 20, the Prairie Mountain Health Region became the first region to move to the orange "Restricted" tier, due to increasing community transmission. Face masks became mandatory in public places, and gathering sizes were restricted to 10.

On August 28, Winnipeg mandated the wearing of masks on Winnipeg Transit and at city-owned facilities.

=== September–November 2020 ===
As of September 3, an outbreak at the Bethesda Place long-term care facility in Steinbach, Manitoba had accounted for four deaths (bringing the provincial total to 16), and at least 17 positive cases among residents and staff. On September 11, the first probable cases within First Nations colonies were reported, including three cases in the Fisher River Cree Nation and Peguis First Nation.

In mid-September, testing capacity in Winnipeg was exhausted for two consecutive days amid a growth in community transmission. Multiple cohorts at the John Pritchard School were also quarantined and switched to remote classes amid cases involving students and staff.

By late-September, a major surge had emerged in Winnipeg. The Winnipeg Metropolitan Region was placed under the "Restricted" (orange) tier of the response system on September 28, restricting the size of gatherings and mandating the wearing of face masks within indoor public spaces; on October 13, the province experienced a triple-digit gain in new cases for the first time, at 124, with 95 of them being within the Winnipeg Health Region. This was surpassed the next day with 146 new cases.

On October 19, new restrictions were instituted in Winnipeg for 14 days on top of the existing Orange-tier restrictions. All gatherings were limited to five people. Retail establishments, restaurants, libraries, galleries, and museums were restricted to 50% capacity, while gyms, libraries, galleries, and museums must also take contact tracing logs. Sports venues were limited to 25% capacity, and bars, gaming establishments, and live entertainment facilities were ordered closed.

==== Province-wide critical alert ====
On October 30, 2020, after announcing a total of 480 new cases, it was announced that effective November 3, Winnipeg would be moved to the "Critical" (red) tier of the response system, and all other regions of Manitoba moved to the "Restricted" tier, for at least 14 days. Under the Critical tier dine-in bars and restaurants, cinemas, and concert halls were ordered closed. Retail establishments were capped at 25% capacity, and faith-based gatherings were capped at 15% capacity or 100 people (whichever is lower). Most elective and non-urgent medical procedures were suspended. The mask mandate extended to gyms while exercising, The Orange tier restrictions elsewhere mirrored the restrictions that had been in place in Winnipeg since October 19.

On November 9, the Southern health region was moved to Critical tier. Chief Medical Health Officer Brent Roussin stated that a circuit breaker was being considered due to widespread community transmission province-wide, with the province having reported over 2,000 cases in the past week alone.

On November 10, it was announced that the entire province would be moved to Critical on the response system effective November 12, prohibiting any social, religious, or cultural gathering, and ordering the closure of all non-critical businesses (with critical businesses restricted to 25% capacity), dine-in bars and restaurants, cinemas, concert halls, gaming facilities (casinos and video lottery), gyms, sports and recreation facilities, and personal care services. K-12 schools remained open to in-person classes, with Roussin arguing that the province was "not seeing a lot of transmission within schools."

On November 20, additional restrictions were added province-wide: visitors at homes are prohibited unless they are providing a critical service or are otherwise covered by an exception, while critical retailers may only admit a maximum of 250 customers at once, and are prohibited from displaying or selling non-critical goods to in-store customers. On November 23, the province reported its largest increase in cases to-date, at 546.

=== December 2020 – January 2021 ===
On December 8, all present health orders were extended through January 8, 2021 to discourage holiday gatherings. Amendments were also announced effective December 12, making school supplies considered critical goods, and a "seasonal exception" for goods related to holidays. Thrift stores were allowed to reopen without restrictions on goods to reduce disproportionate impact on low-income families. Drive-in events would also be permitted, provided that vehicle passengers are from the same household only, and must remain in the vehicle at all times.

On January 21, 2021, it was announced that restrictions would be modified in the Interlake-Eastern, Prairie Mountain Health, Southern Health, and Winnipeg regions effective January 23, to allow households to have up to two designated visitors, non-critical retail to resume (25% capacity or 250 customers, whichever is lower), and hair salons and non-regulated health services to resume operations with restrictions. Due to a surge in the area, Northern Manitoba remained under the existing restrictions.

=== February–March 2021 ===
On February 12, 2021, the health orders were modified to allow some indoor businesses (besides casinos and concert venues) to reopen at 25% capacity, including restaurants (same household at tables only), gyms, indoor sports facilities (individual instruction only), outdoor sports facilities to resume operations (multi-team tournaments prohibited), weddings to be held with 10 guests, and places of worship to hold in-person services with a limited capacity (10% capacity or 50 people, whichever is lower). The province remained at the "Critical" tier.

On March 5, 2021, the health orders were modified, so that a household may now form a bubble with a second household, and outdoor gatherings of 10 people are now allowed. Any business that was still closed could resume operations, excluding bingo halls, casinos, and indoor theatre or concert venues. Capacity limits for retail stores were raised to 50% or 250 customers (whichever is lower). Restaurants were also raised to 50% capacity and may resume video lottery. Places of worship are increased to 25% capacity or 100 people (whichever is lower), and dance companies, operas, symphonies, and theatre groups are allowed to resume private rehearsals. Indoor sports facilities are relieved from the previous restriction to individual instruction only. Roussin stated that these changes were not a "return to normal", but "a sign that as we continue to follow the fundamentals, and our case numbers continue to decline, we can ensure access to businesses, activities and services that may make our lives better."

On March 18, the province issued a survey asking for feedback on a future downgrade to the "Restricted" (orange) tier.

On April 19, new restrictions were announced due to a third wave and increasing cases of variants of SARS-CoV-2; beginning April 20, gatherings were limited to 10 people, households may only have two designated visitors, places of worship are limited to 25% capacity or 50 people (whichever is lower), and weddings and funerals are limited to 10 people. Beginning April 21, all retail outlets must operate at a maximum of ^{1}/_{3} capacity or 333 people (whichever is lower).

=== April–May 2021 ===
On April 26, Pallister announced further restrictions to lasting for at least four weeks, including prohibiting indoor gatherings and household visitors, restricting gyms, faith-based gatherings, and retail to 25% capacity, and personal services to 50% by-appointment only. Roussin stated that "we need Manitobans to understand how critical we are right now in a race between vaccinations and the variants of concern."

On May 7, Pallister announced that it would impose further and "significant" restrictions effective May 9–30. They restrict retail stores to 10% capacity or 100 people (whichever is fewer), and order the closure of all dine-in restaurants (even outdoors), dance, music, and performing arts schools, galleries, gyms and fitness centres, libraries, museums, and personal care services. Indoor community, cultural, and religious gatherings, indoor sports and recreation, and outdoor sports and recreation with more than five people are prohibited. Outdoor gatherings are limited to five people,

On May 20, ahead of the Victoria Day long weekend and after recording a record 603 new cases (with 409 being in Winnipeg alone), Pallister announced new restrictions that were to be in effect from May 22 through May 26. They prohibit all outdoor gatherings (including outdoor recreation) with people from outside the immediate household, and restrict entry into retail stores to one person per-household (with an exception for a caregiver and their patient), in addition to all other public health orders. These health orders were extended through June 12.

Manitoba sought aid from the federal government due to the current surge. As of May 25, 79 COVID-19 patients in Manitoba were in intensive care. To preserve critical care capacity, the province has had to send ICU patients to hospitals in the neighbouring provinces of Ontario and Saskatchewan.

=== June 2021 ===
On June 8, Pallister announced that the province would offer cards to verify those who have been fully vaccinated. They will initially allow for exceptions from restrictions on health care visitation.

On June 9, Roussin announced that outdoor gatherings of up to five people from up to two households would be allowed beginning June 12. All other public health orders remain in force through at least June 26.

On June 10, Pallister announced plans to ease the current public health orders if certain targets for vaccination (both first and second doses) are met, with the first phase expected to begin by July 1. Roussin emphasized that "the goal is to get to a post-pandemic Manitoba where we have public health recommendations and not restrictions".

On June 26, Manitoba entered milestone 1 of the new framework, allowing some restrictions on gatherings and businesses to be eased to 25% capacity.

=== July 2021 ===
On July 3, the province reported its lowest single-day increase in cases since March, with only 48 new cases.

On July 7, ahead of schedule, the province announced that it had reached the vaccination thresholds required for the second milestone, and that details for the next phase could be revealed as soon as the following week. The province also announced plans for a one-day "vax-a-thon" with a "festive" atmosphere on July 14, during which all of Manitoba's "supersite" vaccine clinics would have an expanded capacity for walk-in appointments.

Details were announced for milestone 2 on July 14, taking effect on July 17.

=== August 2021 ===
Details were announced for milestone 3 on August 3, taking effect on August 7; this phase lifted the indoor mask mandate and further eased some restrictions on gatherings and retail.

On August 11, the province announced that its "supersite" vaccine clinics would also begin to offer youth "catch-up" appointments for other immunizations such as Hepatitis B and HPV, as school-based immunization programs had been suspended due to the pandemic.

On August 24, Pallister announced that new pre-emptive public health orders would be implemented to reduce spread of Delta variant and prevent a fourth wave, including the reinstatement of mask mandates province-wide, new vaccination requirements for various provincial employees who do not agree to regular COVID-19 testing, and plans to restrict further activities to the fully-vaccinated only.

=== September 2021 ===
Effective September 3, proof of vaccination is required for entry to any dining area and all licensed premises (also including food courts effective September 7), casinos and VLT lounges, gyms, cinemas, indoor recreational businesses and activities, and any ticketed concert or sporting event. Furthermore, outdoor gatherings will be capped at 500 unless otherwise exempted by public health.

By late-September, a fourth wave had begun to develop; the Southern health region, which has had some of the lowest vaccination rates province-wide, was noted as having the larger proportion of new cases in the province.

=== October 2021 ===
On October 1, all of Manitoba was moved back to Orange on the Pandemic Response System, and new public health orders were announced effective October 5 to further restrict gatherings involving unvaccinated residents. The province also announced capacity restrictions for retail in the Southern health region.

On October 25, all existing public health orders were renewed for an additional three weeks beginning November 2. In addition, it was stated that due to vaccination rates, as well as their proximity to Winnipeg, the rural municipalities of Cartier, Headingley, Macdonald, Niverville-Ritchot, St. Francois Xavier, and Tache would be excluded from the existing health orders in effect for the Southern health region, and would follow the regulations in effect for the rest of the province (and in particular Winnipeg).

=== February–March 2022 ===
In February 2022, Manitoba began phasing out its remaining COVID-19 public health restrictions. Proof of vaccination requirements were removed for most settings on March 1, and most remaining public health orders were lifted on March 15, 2022.[114][115]

== Provincial government response ==
=== First wave ===
On March 20, a provincial state of emergency was declared under the Emergency Measures Act by Premier Brian Pallister, effective for 30 days. The order restricted public gatherings to no more than 50 people, required retail stores and public transit to enforce social distancing, limited hospitality businesses and theatres to 50% capacity or 50 people (whichever is fewer), and shut down all fitness facilities. Breaches of the order could trigger fines of up to $50,000 or six months imprisonment. On March 30, further directives under the Public Health Act came into effect, which reduced the maximum size of public gatherings to 10 people, and required retail businesses to ensure one to two metres of social distancing between customers.

On April 1, the province ordered the closure of all non-critical businesses to the public, including bars, hair salons, massage clinics, and dine-in restaurants (delivery and take-out would still be allowed, with some restaurants having already done so voluntarily). The order would last for at least 14 days, but could be extended. On April 3, Pallister appealed to people refusing to comply with social distancing recommendations, calling them "thoughtless and stupid" during a press conference.

As of April 9, health orders issued pursuant to the state of emergency became enforceable under provincial law, starting at $486 for individuals and $2,542 for businesses. In Winnipeg, by-law officers were authorized to issue fines of up to $1,000 to those violating the orders in municipal parks, and Winnipeg mayor Brian Bowman warned that a penalty of up to six months in jail would be possible in extreme circumstances. On April 13, the province extended the closure on non-essential businesses by an additional two weeks, and stated that distancing measures would likely continue into the summer.

On April 15, an emergency sitting of the Legislative Assembly of Manitoba was held, in which legislation was passed that granted province's chief public health officer the power to restrict travel within Manitoba and to order individuals to take precautionary measures, such as self-isolation. It also gave the cabinet the authority to fix prices for essential goods, and to establish penalties for price gouging.

On April 20, Pallister announced a 30-day extension of the province's state of emergency, while also setting a goal for Manitoba to be the first Canadian province to reopen its economy.

==== Lifting of first wave health orders ====
On May 4, Manitoba began the first phase of lifting its public health orders.

Phase	Effective date	Restrictions eased
1	May 4, 2020	Non-essential medical services, outdoor recreation facilities, barber shops and hair salons, museums, art galleries, libraries, retail businesses (including shopping malls), and campgrounds were allowed to re-open, subject to social distancing and other guidelines issued by the province.; Restaurants allowed to offer outdoor dine-in on patios.; On May 22, the group size restrictions were loosened to allow 25 people at indoor locations and 50 people at outdoor gatherings. Practices in professional sports could also resume.
2	June 1, 2020	Restaurants and bars allowed to offer indoor dine-in service at 50% capacity.; Pools and fitness facilities allowed to reopen.; Direct travel allowed to parks, campgrounds, lodges, etc. in Northern Manitoba.; Daycare capacity expanded to 24 children.; One-on-one tutoring and small group assessments in elementary and secondary schools became allowed (but still remaining closed for regular in-class instruction for the rest of the school year).; Post-secondary art studios and labs allowed to operate with a maximum capacity of 25.; Spas, manicurists and estheticians allowed to resume service.; Outdoor "drive-in" religious services allowed.; Outdoor recreation facilities allowed to expand to full capacity with social distancing.
3	June 21, 2020	Group size limits increased to 50 indoors and 100 outdoors (though larger gatherings are allowable if participants are cohorted into groups, with a maximum indoor capacity of 30% of licensed capacity).; Hard capacity limits lifted for retail establishments, restaurants, bars, and health care/therapy businesses; may admit as many customers as they can while maintaining appropriate physical distancing. Bars may not offer standing service or dance floors.; Daycares allowed to expand to full capacity.; Indoor recreation facilities (including bingo halls and VLT lounges, but excluding cinemas and casinos) and permanent outdoor amusement parks were allowed to open at half capacity.; Some interprovincial travel restrictions lifted for those travelling from Western Canada or Northwest Ontario.
4	July 25, 2020	Casinos, cinemas, and theatres allowed to reopen at 30% capacity.; Religious and spiritual services increased to a maximum capacity of 30%, with the requirement for cohorting removed.; Based on feedback from a survey conducted by provincial officials, several planned changes were adjusted and deferred, including casinos and cinemas opening at 50% capacity (rather than 30%), lifting of self-isolation requirements for travel east of Terrace Bay, Ontario, and allowing standing service at bars.

=== Health care and testing ===
By March 14, the province was testing 500 patients per-day. All patients in Manitoba's intensive care units, as well as those admitted to a hospital for respiratory illnesses, have also been tested.

On March 21, a drive-through testing centre opened in Winnipeg, at a site close to the Victoria General Hospital. As with walk-in testing centres, a referral is necessary to use the drive-through testing centre. As of March 21, 2020, there were four other walk-in test centres in Winnipeg, as well as test centres in Brandon, Thompson, Selkirk, Flin Flon, Steinbach and The Pas.

On April 16, testing became available by-request for essential workers. The province also established an online cognitive behavioural therapy program for those with anxiety as a result of the pandemic. On April 28, testing became available to any resident showing symptoms. On May 4, the province began to increase its testing of asymptomatic patients.

By August, the province expected a testing capacity of 2500 per day.

=== Travel advisories and restrictions ===
On March 15, Roussin issued an advisory against international travel, and recommended 14 days of self-isolation on return.

On March 27, informational checkpoints were established at the Ontario and Saskatchewan borders on the Trans-Canada Highway, and on the Saskatchewan border on highways 16, 5, and 2. Vehicles entering Manitoba would be briefly stopped, and their drivers provided with an informational pamphlet on health risks and international travel restrictions.

On April 17, it was announced that anyone travelling to Manitoba from outside the province (including interprovincial travel) would be required by law to self-isolate for 14 days on arrival, although a 50-kilometre "buffer zone" exists in Northwestern Ontario. To protect vulnerable and remote northern communities, the province also restricted non-essential travel across the 53rd parallel. In Phase 2, these restrictions were softened to allow "direct" travel to sites such as campgrounds in the region.

The self-isolation requirement for interprovincial travel was removed in Phase 3 for those travelling into Manitoba from Western Canada, Northern Canada, or Ontario west of Terrace Bay. Interprovincial travel from outside these regions will also be exempted for those participating in a film production or professional sporting event, provided that 14 days of self-isolation are completed before travel, and that proper hygiene is practised while travelling to Manitoba.

On August 12, Peguis First Nation re-introduced self-isolation restrictions for individuals travelling from Brandon and Steinbach, due to increasing COVID-19 spread in those areas.

On January 26, 2021, due to concerns surrounding variants of SARS-CoV-2, Premier Pallister announced that the 14-day self-isolation requirement for interprovincial travel into Manitoba would be reinstated effective at 11:59 p.m. CT on January 28, 2021. Essential travel, medical travel, and those who regularly perform essential cross-border travel will be exempt.

=== RestartMB system ===
On August 19, 2020, the provincial government migrated to a tier-based response framework known as the #RestartMB Pandemic Response System, which would classify local risk of COVID-19 transmission based on health metrics such as test positivity, the rate of new cases, contact tracing, and health care capacity. It would allow restrictions to be imposed at the local level and by-sector to control outbreaks, without the need to impose more province-wide restrictions. All of Manitoba was initially placed at the "Caution" (yellow) tier, and it was stated that the "Restricted" (orange) and "Critical" (red) tiers would involve the reimplementation of wider restrictions.

#RestartMB Pandemic Response System
Level	Criteria
Limited Risk (green)	COVID-19 is "broadly contained", community transmission is "low to undetectable", and effective treatments and/or vaccines are available.
Caution (yellow)	Community transmission exists at low levels with small outbreaks.
Restricted (orange)	Community transmission is occurring at higher levels, but is capable of being managed by the public health system.
Critical (red)	Community transmission is uncontained; the public health system is at or near capacity, and cannot control outbreaks with contact tracing or testing.

=== 4-3-2-One Great Summer ===
In June 2021, Premier Pallister and Roussin announced a new reopening plan replacing RestartMB known as 4-3-2-One Great Summer, which is based on vaccination progress. The plan is named for four categories of activities that residents "want most" ("Gathering and socializing", "Travel and tourism", "Shopping and services", and "Dining out and entertainment"), three milestones with targets around holidays (Canada Day, Civic Holiday, and Labour Day), and two responsibilities for all residents to receive a COVID-19 vaccine and continue following all public health orders. Roussin stated that details on restrictions lifted for each milestone would not be immediately revealed, to allow for flexibility,

4-3-2-One Great Summer plan
Milestone	Prerequisites	Restrictions	Effective
1	70% of eligible residents have received at least one vaccine dose, and 25% of eligible residents are fully vaccinated.	Private outdoor gatherings limited to 10 people, people from out of the immediate household may enter a home for "essential" activities.; Public outdoor gatherings limited to 25 people.; Retail capped at 25% capacity or 250 people (whichever is fewer); Personal care services by appointment only at 50% capacity.; Restaurants and bars allowed to operate at 25% capacity indoors and 50% outdoors. Outdoor tables limited to eight people. Indoor tables restricted to members of the immediate household unless fully vaccinated.; Organized recreation activities capped at 25 people outdoors, and 5 people indoors.; Gyms may operate classes at 25% capacity with masks and three metres social distancing between patrons required.; Indoor faith-based and spiritual gatherings capped at 25% or 25 people (whichever is fewer), outdoor limited to 50 people.; Those who are fully vaccinated may travel out of province without mandatory self-isolation on return, visit family members at personal care homes and hospitals, and participate in social activities at personal care homes or communal living settings.	June 26, 2021
2	75% of eligible residents have received at least one vaccine dose, and 50% of eligible residents are fully vaccinated.	Private gatherings limited to 10 people indoors, and 25 outdoors.; Public indoor gatherings limited to 25 people.; Public outdoor gatherings limited to 150 people.; Retail capped at 50% capacity or 500 people (whichever is fewer); Indoor restaurants allowed to operate at 50% capacity. Indoor tables restricted to members of the immediate household unless fully vaccinated. Video lottery may resume.; Personal care services may offer walk-in appointments.; Bingo halls, casinos, cinemas, galleries and museums, and VLT lounges may operate at 50% capacity for fully-vaccinated patrons only. Where appropriate, children under 12 must be accompanied by fully-vaccinated family members.; Gyms may operate classes at 50% capacity with three metres social distancing between patrons.; Indoor faith-based and spiritual gatherings capped at 50% or 150 people (whichever is fewer), outdoor limited to 150 people.; Outdoor and funerals weddings capped at 150 attendees, indoor weddings and funerals capped at 25 attendees.; "large-scale, outdoor professional sports or performing arts events" may be held pursuant to government consent and approval of biosecurity protocols.	July 17, 2021
3	80% of eligible residents have received at least one vaccine dose, and 75% of eligible residents are fully vaccinated.	Indoor mask mandate lifted, but are still strongly recommended for those who are not yet vaccinated.; Indoor gatherings and organized events limited to 50 people or 50% capacity, whichever is greater.; Outdoor gatherings and organized events limited to 1,500 people or 50% capacity, whichever is lesser.; Spectator capacity for sports and recreation are capped at 50%; outdoor events with a larger capacity may be held pursuant to government consent and approval of biosecurity protocols.; Dance floors remain prohibited at organized gatherings, and attendees are recommended not to mingle or engage in close gatherings.; Capacity restrictions for private gatherings, retail, gyms, personal care services, and day camps lifted.; Restaurants may operate at full capacity without restrictions on group sizes, vaccination status, or operating hours. Patrons are to remain at their tables as much as possible, not socialize between tables, and maintain two metres social distancing when not at their table.; Cinemas, art galleries, and museums may operate at 50% capacity.; Bingo halls, casinos, concert halls, professional sporting events, racing facilities, and VLT lounges may operate at full capacity for fully-vaccinated patrons only. Where appropriate, children under 12 must be accompanied by fully-vaccinated family members.	August 7, 2021

=== Fourth wave health orders ===
Effective	Restrictions
September 7, 2021 Some restrictions in effect September 3.	Face masks are mandatory when in a public indoor space.; Indoor gatherings and organized events limited to 50 people or 50% capacity, whichever is greater.; Public outdoor gatherings are limited to 500 people. Outdoor events with a larger capacity may be held pursuant to government consent and approval of biosecurity protocols.; Bingo halls, casinos, concert halls, gyms, restaurants and licensed premises, indoor sports and recreation facilities, ticketed concerts and sporting events, and VLT lounges may only admit patrons presenting proof of full vaccination. Where appropriate, children under 12 must be accompanied by fully-vaccinated family members.
October 5, 2021	All other aforementioned health orders apply unless otherwise noted.; If any participant is eligible to be vaccinated but has not yet been: Private indoor gatherings are restricted to guests from one other household.; Private outdoor gatherings are restricted to 10 people.; Public indoor gatherings are restricted to 25 people or 25% capacity (whichever is lower).; Faith-based gatherings are restricted to 25 people or 33% capacity (whichever is greater) .; Public outdoor gatherings are limited to 50 people. Outdoor events with a larger capacity may be held pursuant to government approval, including the requirement for all participants to be fully-vaccinated.; Retail stores in the Southern health region capped at 50% capacity.
November 2, 2021	All other aforementioned health orders apply unless otherwise noted.; Retail stores in the Southern health region capped at 50% capacity outside.; The rural municipalities of Cartier, St. Francois Xavier, Headingley, Macdonald, Ritchot, and Tache are removed from public health orders affecting the Southern region
November 13, 2021	Proof of at least one vaccine dose is required for participants 12–17 in indoor recreational sports (effective December 6); If any participant is eligible to be vaccinated but has not yet been: Faith-based gatherings in restricted areas of the Southern region are restricted to cohorts of 25 people per-room, to a maximum of 250 attendees.
December 20, 2021	Private indoor gatherings are restricted to up to 10 guests provided that all guests over age 12 are fully vaccinated.; Bars and restaurants, gyms, cinemas and theatres, faith-based gatherings, museums, libraries, sports and performing arts events, are limited to 50% capacity.; Faith-based gatherings are restricted to 25% or 25 people (whichever is lower) if a service admits guests who are not vaccinated.; Sports tournaments are prohibited. Games and practices remain allowed.
December 28, 2021	Public gatherings are limited to 50% capacity or 250 people, whichever is fewer.; Bars and restaurants, gyms, cinemas and theatres, faith-based gatherings, museums, libraries, sports and performing arts events, recreation facilities, gaming facilities, and seasonal facilities are limited to 50% capacity or 250 people, whichever is fewer.; Alcohol sales must end at 10:00 p.m. nightly.
February 8, 2022	Gyms, cinemas and theatres, museums, libraries, and sports and performing arts events, may increase to 50% capacity.; Alcohol sales must end at 12:00 a.m. nightly.; Provided that all guests over age 12 are fully vaccinated.; Private indoor gatherings are restricted to up to 25 people; Private outdoor gatherings are restricted to up to 50 people (plus the household); Faith-based gatherings are restricted to 50% capacity; If any participant over age 12 is not fully vaccinated; Private indoor gatherings are restricted to 10 people.; Private outdoor gatherings are restricted to 20 people (plus the household); Faith-based gatherings are restricted to 50% capacity or 250 people, whichever is fewer
February 15, 2022	Pandemic Response System moved to Yellow ("Caution"); Capacity limits removed for bars and restaurants, gyms, cinemas and theatres, museums, libraries, and sports and performing arts events. Proof of vaccination is still required where applicable.; Capacity limits removed for public outdoor gatherings; Capacity limits removed all private gatherings; If any participant over age 12 is not fully vaccinated; Public indoor gatherings are restricted to up to 50 people; Faith-based gatherings are restricted to 50% capacity or 500 people, whichever is fewer; Proof of vaccination no longer required for participants 12–17 in indoor recreational sports.; Close contacts of positive cases no longer required to self-isolate.
March 1, 2022	Proof of vaccination requirement removed for "most settings".
March 15, 2022	Most remaining public health orders lifted.; Face masks no longer mandatory in most places, besides health care facilities; Mandatory self-isolation no longer required after a positive test.; COVID Alert app is deprecated; positive cases can no longer be reported to the app in Manitoba.; Pandemic Response System moved to Green ("Limited Risk")

== See also ==
- COVID-19 pandemic in Canada
