= Ray Brunel =

Canadian ice hockey centreman (1936–2010)

Raymond Edward Joseph Brunel (September 28, 1936 – February 24, 2010) was a Canadian ice hockey centreman who played 842 professional games with 272 goals, 420 assists for 692 career points.

Brunel was born in St. Lupicin, Manitoba, and resided in Winnipeg, Manitoba. He was an avid golfer at the St Boniface Golf Club. Brunel died in February 2010.

== Awards and achievements ==
- MJHL First Team All-Star (1956 & 1957)
- MJHL Scoring Champion (1956 & 1957)
- MJHL Goal Leader (1957)
- MJHL MVP (1957)
- Calder Cup (AHL) Championship (1964)
- “Honoured Member” of the Manitoba Hockey Hall of Fame
