= Steve "Boomer" Hawrysh Award =

The Steve "Boomer" Hawrysh Award is an ice hockey trophy that is presented annually to the Most Valuable Player of the Manitoba Junior Hockey League (MJHL) during the regular season.

Steve “Boomer” Hawrysh reached a milestone in 1992 with 60 consecutive years in total hockey involvement in Dauphin. As a player, Hawrysh was on three Manitoba championship winners with the Dauphin intermediates. He began coaching in 1952 in Dauphin, Manitoba. Steve Hawrysh was one of the original architects of the new Manitoba Junior Hockey League.

== MJHL Most Valuable Players ==
Season	Winner	Team
2014	Parker Thomas	Selkirk Steelers
2013	Guillaume Naud	Dauphin Kings
2012	Jayson Argue	Swan Valley Stampeders
2011	Shane Luke	Dauphin Kings
2010	Taylor Dickin	Selkirk Steelers
2009	Eric Delong	Portage Terriers
2008	Bryan Kauk	Dauphin Kings
2007	Brant Hilton	Winnipeg South Blues
2006	Tyler Czuba	Swan Valley Stampeders
2005	Ryan Garbutt	Winnipeg South Blues
2000	Junior Lessard	Portage Terriers
1998	Jedd Crumb	Winnipeg South Blues
1997	Chris Thomas	Winkler Flyers
1995	Cory Cyrenne	St. Boniface Saints
1994	Ryan Smith	St. James Canadians
1982	Grant Ledyard	Fort Garry Blues
1977	Jim Misener	Dauphin Kings
1976	Darryl Einarson	Selkirk Steelers
1974	Mark Izzard	West Kildonan North Stars
1973	Brian Engblom	Winnipeg Monarchs
1968	Jim Trosky	St. Boniface Saints
1966	Terry Jones	Winnipeg Rangers
1965	Wayne Stephenson	Winnipeg Braves
1960	George Hill	Brandon Wheat Kings
1958	Gord Labossiere	Transcona Rangers
1957	Ray Brunel	St. Boniface Canadiens
