= Waywayseecappo Wolverines =

Manitoba ice hockey team

- City: Waywayseecappo First Nation
- League: MJHL
- Division: West
- Founded: 1999
- Home arena: Waywayseecappo Arena
- Colours: Amber; Black
- General manager: Landyn Cochrane
- Head coach: Landyn Cochrane
- Website: waywaywolverines.com

The Waywayseecappo Wolverines are a Junior ice hockey team in the Manitoba Junior Hockey League. They play their home games in the Waywayseecappo Arena in Waywayseecappo First Nation.

== History ==
Statistics
Season	GP	W	L	T	OTL	SOL	GF	GA	Pts	Finish	Playoffs
1999–00	64	18	42	0	4	4	167	279	40	12th overall	Did not qualify
2000–01	64	29	31	0	4	1	237	252	62	9th overall	Did not qualify
2001–02	64	8	51	0	5	4	166	443	21	12th overall	Did not qualify
2002–03	62	2	57	0	3	2	186	512	7	12th overall	Did not qualify
2003–04	64	17	45	0	2	0	201	331	36	10th overall	Did not qualify
2004–05	63	20	32	0	11	0	202	240	51	10th overall	Did not qualify
2005–06	63	10	47	0	6	0	139	310	26	11th overall	Did not qualify
2006–07	62	25	33	0	4	0	209	250	54	7th overall	Lost quarterfinal against Dauphin (4:3)
2007–08	62	37	23	0	2	1	302	210	76	5th overall	Lost quarterfinal against Dauphin (4:3)
2008–09	62	26	27	0	9	6	192	200	61	7th overall	Lost quarterfinal against Portage La Prairie (4:0)
2009–10	62	23	37	0	2	2	154	237	48	10th overall	Did not qualify
2010–11	62	29	26	0	7	0	207	204	65	7th overall	Lost quarterfinal against Winkler (4:2)
2011–12	62	26	27	0	9	6	209	207	61	9th overall	Did not qualify
2012–13	60	25	30	0	5	2	191	222	55	7th overall	Lost quarterfinal against Dauphin (4:2)
2013–14	60	18	39	0	3	0	152	219	39	10th overall	Lost in first round against OCN (2:1)
2014–15	60	24	41	0	5	5	148	192	53	8th overall	Won first round against Dauphin (2:0); Lost quarterfinal against Portage la Prairie (4:0)
2015–16	60	16	39	0	5	3	151	250	37	10th overall	Lost in first round against Swan Valley (2:0)
2016–17	60	14	42	0	4	0	177	273	32	11th overall	Did not qualify
2017–18	60	8	48	0	4	1	130	323	20	11th overall	Did not qualify
2018–19	60	28	27	0	5	3	161	177	61	8th overall	Lost quarterfinal against Portage la Prairie (4:0)
2019–20	60	32	21	0	7	2	206	199	71	5th overall	Playoffs cancelled
2020–21	10	7	3	0	0	0	40	35	14	4th overall	Playoffs cancelled
2021–22	54	33	18	0	3	1	241	187	69	4th overall	Lost quarterfinal against Virden (4:0)
2022–23	58	29	24	0	5	2	186	193	63	8th overall	Did not qualify
2023–24	58	24	30	1	3	3	190	217	52	5th in division 10th overall	Did not qualify
2024–25	58	25	30	2	1	1	167	192	53	4th in division 9th overall	Lost quarterfinal against Dauphin (4:1)

Source: "Waywayseecappo Wolverines statistics and history". hockeydb.com.

== See also ==
- List of ice hockey teams in Manitoba

== Sources ==
- MacNeil, John (6 February 2011). "Van De Velde shows Wayway as junior leader". Brandon Sun.
- Bryksa, Joe (19 February 2016). "Gallery: Waywayseecappo rink". Winnipeg Free Press.
- Friesen, Thomas (19 September 2019). "Waywayseecappo looking for more playoff action". Brandon Sun.
- Stelter, Ryan (30 March 2020). "Harnett helps lead Wolverines resurgence". Brandon Sun.
- Duff, Darnell (6 April 2020). "Wolverines Continue Growth". 730ckdm.com.
- Anthony, Dave (26 November 2020). "Convo with the Coach | Taylor Harnett". mjhlhockey.ca. Manitoba Junior Hockey League.
- Shewchuk, Devon (17 March 2021). "Wolverines look back on junior hockey careers". Brandon Sun.
- Bernhardt, Darren (21 February 2022). "Manitoba hockey player suspended amid allegations of racist gesture". CBC News. CBC/Radio-Canada.
- Peacock, Angela (21 March 2025). "'Unashamed': Manitoba hockey team's post-game prayer goes viral". CHVN Radio.
