= 2014–15 MJHL season =

- League: Manitoba Junior Hockey League
- Sport: Ice hockey
- Games: 330
- Teams: 11

Regular Season
- First Place: Portage Terriers
- Season MVP: Tristan Keck
- Top scorer: Zach Waldvogel

Turnbull Cup
- Champions: Portage Terriers
- Runners-up: Steinbach Pistons
- Playoff MVP: Dane Schioler

List of MJHL seasons
- ← 2013–14 2015–16 →

The 2014–15 season was the Manitoba Junior Hockey League's (MJHL) 98th season of operation.

The Portage Terriers dominated the MJHL from start to finish this season, posting the best winning percentage in league history and going undefeated in the playoffs, to win their ninth Turnbull Cup. After finishing second at the 2015 Western Canada Cup, the Terriers hosted the 2015 Royal Bank Cup in Portage la Prairie and became the first Manitoba team since 1974 to win the national Junior "A" championship.

== Season highlights ==
- The league eliminates the Addison and Sherwood Divisions and adopts a balanced 60-game schedule for each team.
- Rule change: in accordance with Canadian Junior Hockey League (CJHL) guidelines, players penalized for fighting are assessed a game misconduct penalty. This rule change is part of a multi-year initiative to reduce fighting in junior hockey.
- Portage Terriers national championship season
  - Set MJHL record for highest single-season winning percentage.
  - Go undefeated in the MJHL playoffs to win the Turnbull Cup.
  - Host and win the 2015 Royal Bank Cup in Portage la Prairie, the first national Junior "A" champion from Manitoba since 1974.
  - Head coach Blake Spiller is named CJHL Coach of the Year.

== Standings ==
	GP	W	L	OTL	SOL	Pts	GF	GA
Portage Terriers	60	53	3	1	3	110	285	120
Steinbach Pistons	60	39	14	2	5	85	218	150
Winnipeg Blues	60	38	15	2	5	83	231	181
Winkler Flyers	60	31	17	3	9	74	204	185
Virden Oil Capitals	60	30	20	6	4	70	202	191
Swan Valley Stampeders	60	29	26	3	3	64	177	198
Selkirk Steelers	60	29	29	1	1	60	181	201
Waywayseecappo Wolverines	60	24	31	0	5	53	148	192
Dauphin Kings	60	23	32	2	4	52	166	217
OCN Blizzard	60	20	35	2	3	45	167	230
Neepawa Natives	60	15	42	2	1	33	141	255

== Playoffs ==
Survivor Series
7	Selkirk	2
10	OCN	0
8	Waywayseecappo	2
9	Dauphin	0

Quarterfinals
1	Portage	4
8	Waywayseecappo	0
2	Steinbach	4
7	Selkirk	0
3	Winnipeg	4
6	Swan Valley	0
4	Winkler	2
5	Virden	4

Semifinals
1	Portage	4
5	Virden	0
2	Steinbach	4
3	Winnipeg	1

Turnbull Cup Finals
1	Portage	4
2	Steinbach	0

=== Post MJHL playoffs ===
Western Canada Cup

- Portage Terriers finish second in the round robin; defeated by Penticton Vees 4–3 in championship game; defeat Melfort Mustangs 3–2 in runner-up game.

Royal Bank Cup

- Portage Terriers (host team) finish first in the round robin; defeat Melfort Mustangs 6–1 in semi-final; defeat Carleton Place Canadians 5–2 in the final to win the national Junior 'A' championship.

== League awards ==
- Steve "Boomer" Hawrysh Award (MVP): Tristan Keck, Winkler
- MJHL Top Goaltender Award: Nick Deery, Steinbach
- Brian Kozak Award (Top Defenceman): Tanner Jago, Portage
- Vince Leah Trophy (Rookie of the Year): James Shearer, Steinbach
- Lorne Lyndon Memorial Trophy (Hockey Ability and Sportsmanship): Brad Bowles, Portage
- Muzz McPherson Award (Coach of the Year): Blake Spiller, Portage
- Mike Ridley Trophy (Scoring Champion): Zack Waldvogel, Portage
- MJHL Playoff MVP: Dane Schioler, Portage

=== CJHL awards ===
- CJHL Player of the Year (MJHL): Tristan Keck, Winkler
- CJHL Coach of the Year: Blake Spiller, Portage
- CJHL Western All-star Team: Tanner Jago, Portage
