= Mario Ferraro =

Canadian ice hockey player (born 1998)

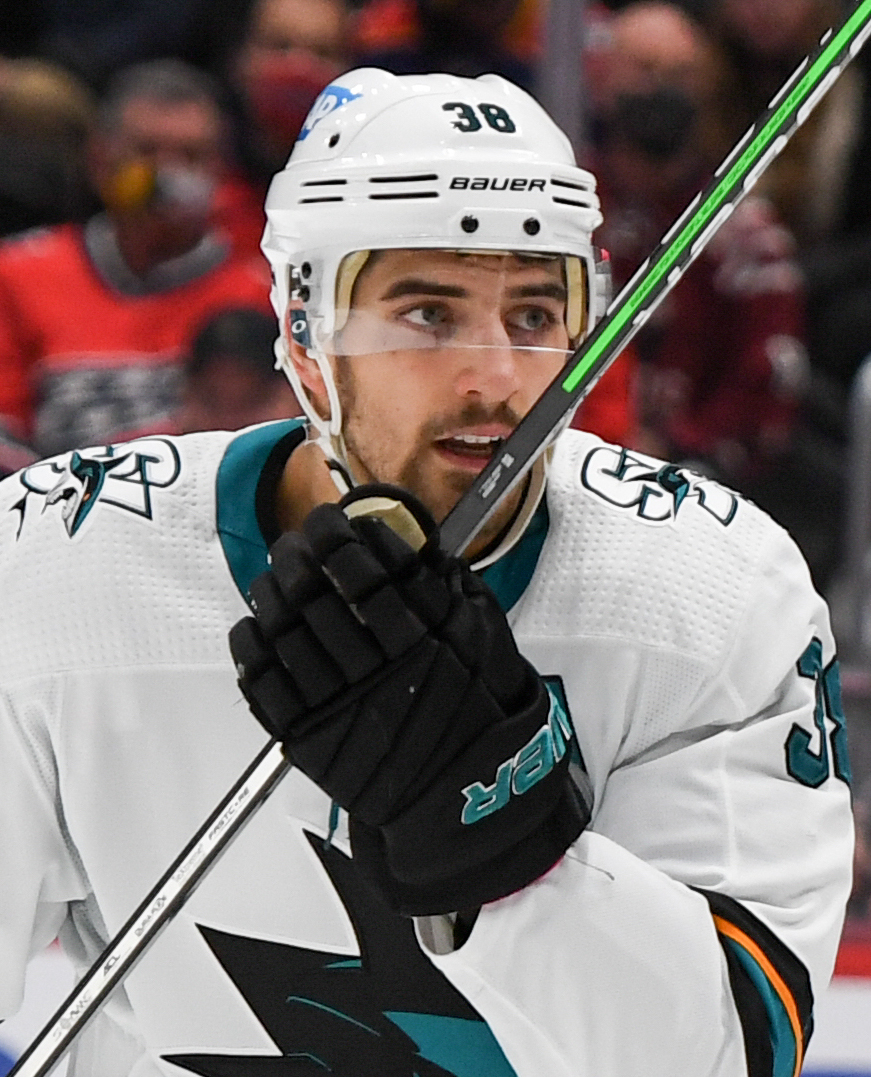
- Ferraro with the San Jose Sharks in 2022
- Born: September 17, 1998 (age 28) King City, Ontario, Canada
- Height: 5 ft 11 in (180 cm)
- Weight: 200 lb (91 kg; 14 st 4 lb)
- Position: Defence
- Shoots: Left
- NHL team Former teams: Winnipeg Jets; San Jose Sharks
- National team: Canada
- NHL draft: 49th overall, 2017; San Jose Sharks
- Playing career: 2019–present

Mario Ferraro (born September 17, 1998) is a Canadian professional ice hockey player who is a defenceman for the Winnipeg Jets of the National Hockey League (NHL). After one season with the Des Moines Buccaneers of the junior United States Hockey League, he was selected by the San Jose Sharks 49th overall in the 2017 NHL entry draft. He joined the University of Massachusetts Amherst following the draft, spending two seasons there before signing with the Sharks. Ferraro made his NHL debut with the Sharks in 2019.

== Playing career ==
Ferraro spent the 2016–17 season with the Des Moines Buccaneers of the United States Hockey League. He scored 41 points in 60 games with the Buccaneers, tying for first among defencemen for goals and second in assists and points. As a result he was named to the USHL First-All Star Team and All-Rookie Team. After the season Ferraro was selected in the second round, 49th overall, by the San Jose Sharks at the 2017 NHL entry draft. He subsequently went to the University of Massachusetts Amherst, and set a team record for points by a freshman defenceman with 23 points in 39 games. He spent a second season at the university, recording 14 points in 41 games. After the conclusion of the 2018–19 season he was signed to a contract by the Sharks.

He joined the Sharks for the start of the 2019–20 NHL season and made his debut on October 2, 2019, against the Vegas Golden Knights. His first point, an assist, came in his second game on October 5, also against Vegas.

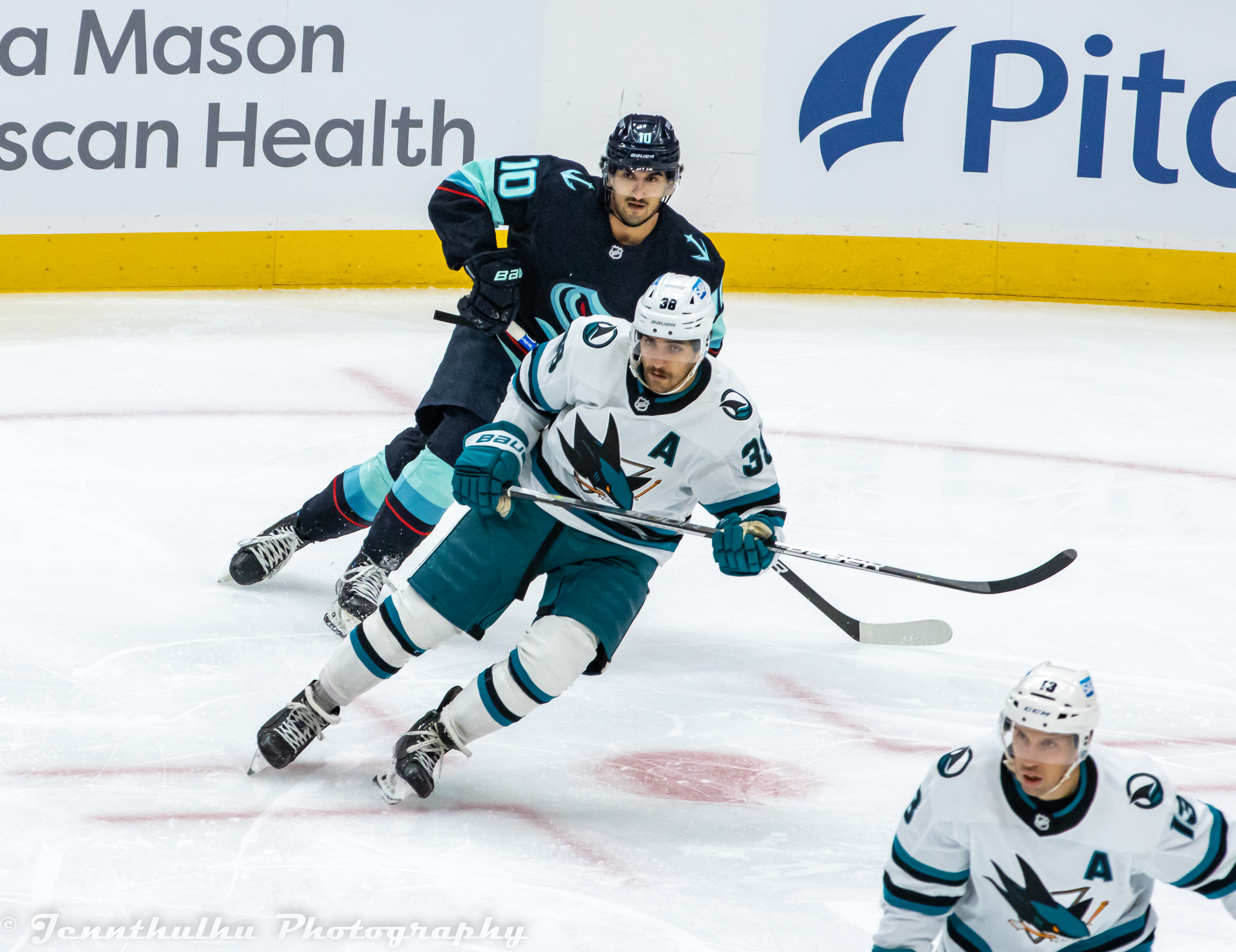
Ferraro during a game against the Seattle Kraken.

His first career NHL goal came on December 28, 2019, in a 6–1 win against the Philadelphia Flyers.

He re-signed to a four-year contract with the Sharks on August 4, 2022.

On July 1, 2026, Ferraro signed a three-year, $12 million contract with the Winnipeg Jets. Later, on October 2nd, 2026- Ferraro scored his first goal as a Winnipeg Jet- in his first game as a Winnipeg Jet- in a 4-3 Jets overtime loss to the visiting Boston Bruins.

== Personal life ==
Ferraro, the son of Robert and Diana Ferraro, was born in Toronto, Ontario and grew up in King City, Ontario.

Ferraro creates tech reviews on his Youtube channel, Youngest of Plugs.

Ferraro married in February 2025 and he welcomed his first child in autumn of 2025.

== Career statistics ==
=== Regular season and playoffs ===
			Regular season					Playoffs
Season	Team	League	GP	G	A	Pts	PIM	GP	G	A	Pts	PIM
2012–13	Toronto Marlboros Bantam AAA	GTBHL	—	—	—	—	—	—	—	—	—	—
2013–14	Don Mills Flyers Minor Midget AAA	GTMMHL	33	6	5	11	8	2	0	0	0	0
2013–14	Don Mills Flyers Midget AAA	GTHL	1	0	0	0	0	—	—	—	—	—
2014–15	Toronto Patriots	OJHL	43	1	11	12	28	22	1	3	4	16
2015–16	Toronto Patriots	OJHL	51	6	34	40	46	—	—	—	—	—
2016–17	Des Moines Buccaneers	USHL	60	8	33	41	42	3	0	0	0	0
2017–18	UMass-Amherst	HE	39	4	19	23	20	—	—	—	—	—
2018–19	UMass-Amherst	HE	41	2	12	14	23	—	—	—	—	—
2019–20	San Jose Sharks	NHL	61	2	9	11	30	—	—	—	—	—
2020–21	San Jose Sharks	NHL	56	1	16	17	22	—	—	—	—	—
2021–22	San Jose Sharks	NHL	63	2	12	14	16	—	—	—	—	—
2022–23	San Jose Sharks	NHL	72	4	7	11	24	—	—	—	—	—
2023–24	San Jose Sharks	NHL	78	3	18	21	26	—	—	—	—	—
2024–25	San Jose Sharks	NHL	78	5	12	17	53	—	—	—	—	—
2025–26	San Jose Sharks	NHL	82	7	16	23	35	—	—	—	—	—
NHL totals			490	24	90	114	216	—	—	—	—	—

Medal record

Representing Canada

Ice hockey

World Championships
Gold medal – first place	2021 Latvia	

=== International ===
Year	Team	Event	Result	GP	G	A	Pts	PIM
2021	Canada	WC	1st place, gold medalist(s)	10	0	2	2	0
Senior totals				10	0	2	2	0

== Awards and achievements ==
Award	Year
USHL
First All-Star Team	2016–17
All-Rookie Team	2017
College
All-Rookie Team	2017–18
Third All-Star Team	2018–19
