= 2014–15 SIJHL season =

- League: Superior International Junior Hockey League
- Sport: Hockey
- Duration: Regular season 2014-09-19 – 2015-03-14; Playoffs; 2015-03-17 – 2015-04-22
- Teams: 5
- Finals champions: Fort Frances Lakers

SIJHL seasons
- 2013–14 2015–16

The 2014–15 SIJHL season is the 14th season of the Superior International Junior Hockey League (SIJHL). The five teams of the SIJHL will play 56-game schedules.

Come February, the top teams of the league will play down for the Bill Salonen Cup, the SIJHL championship. The winner of the Bill Salonen Cup will compete in the Central Canadian Junior "A" championship, the Dudley Hewitt Cup. If successful against the winners of the Ontario Junior Hockey League and Northern Ontario Junior Hockey League, the champion would then move on to play in the Canadian Junior Hockey League championship, the 2015 Royal Bank Cup.

== Changes ==
- Wisconsin Wilderness fold due to lack of arena.

== Final standings ==
Note: GP = Games played; W = Wins; L = Losses; OTL = Overtime losses; SL = Shootout losses; GF = Goals for; GA = Goals against; PTS = Points; x = clinched playoff berth; y = clinched division title; z = clinched conference title

Standings
Team	Centre	W–L–OTL	GF–GA	Points
Fort Frances Lakers	Fort Frances, Ontario	43-11-2	254-197	88
Minnesota Iron Rangers	Hoyt Lakes, Minnesota	30-20-6	246-198	66
Dryden Ice Dogs	Dryden, Ontario	30-21-5	244-204	65
Thunder Bay North Stars	Thunder Bay, Ontario	27-25-4	200-227	58
English River Miners	Ear Falls, Ontario	10-41-5	159-295	25

Teams listed on the official league website.

Standings listed on official league website.

== 2015 Bill Salonen Cup Playoffs ==
Quarter-finals
4	Thunder Bay	3
5	English River	0

Semi-finals
1	Fort Frances	4
4	Thunder Bay	1
2	Minnesota	2
3	Dryden	4

Bill Salonen Cup Finals
1	Fort Frances	4
2	Dryden	2

Playoff results are listed on the official league website.

== Dudley Hewitt Cup Championship ==
Hosted by the Fort Frances Lakers in Fort Frances, Ontario.

== 2015 Royal Bank Cup Championship ==
Hosted by the Portage Terriers in Portage la Prairie, Manitoba.

== Scoring leaders ==
Note: GP = Games played; G = Goals; A = Assists; Pts = Points; PIM = Penalty minutes

Player / Team / GP / G / A / Pts / PIM

== Leading goaltenders ==
Note: GP = Games played; Mins = Minutes played; W = Wins; L = Losses: OTL = Overtime losses; SL = Shootout losses; GA = Goals Allowed; SO = Shutouts; GAA = Goals against average

Player / Team / GP / Mins / W / L / OTL / SOL / GA / SO / Sv% / GAA

== Players selected in 2015 NHL entry draft ==
To be decided after season concludes.

== Awards ==
To be decided after season concludes.

== See also ==
- 2015 Royal Bank Cup
- Dudley Hewitt Cup
- Ontario Junior Hockey League
- Northern Ontario Junior Hockey League
- Greater Ontario Junior Hockey League
- 2014 in ice hockey
- 2015 in ice hockey

Preceded by 2013–14 SIJHL season	SIJHL seasons	Succeeded by 2015–16 SIJHL season
