= 2017 Dudley Hewitt Cup =

Central Region Jr A Championship

Tournament details
- Venue: Duncan Memorial Community Gardens in Trenton, Ontario
- Host team: Trenton Golden Hawks

Final positions
- Champions: Trenton Golden Hawks
- Runners-up: Georgetown Raiders

Tournament statistics
- Games played: 8

The 2017 Dudley Hewitt Cup was the 46th Central Canadian Jr A Ice Hockey championship for the Canadian Junior Hockey League. The winners represented the central region in the 2017 Royal Bank Cup in Cobourg, ON.

== Teams ==
- Trenton Golden Hawks (Host)

Regular Season: 42-9-2-1 (1st OJHL East Division)
Playoffs: Defeated Newmarket Hurricanes 4-2, Defeated Stouffville Spirit 4-0, Defeated Cobourg Cougars 4-0, Defeated by Georgetown Raiders 4-3.

- Georgetown Raiders (OJHL Champions)

Regular Season: 45-5-2-2 (1st OJHL West Division)
Playoffs: Defeated Buffalo Jr. Sabres 4-1, Defeated Toronto Jr. Canadiens 4-0, Defeated Oakville Blades 4-2, Defeated Trenton Golden Hawks 4-3 to win league championship.

- Powassan Voodoos (NOJHL Champions)

Regular Season: 46-7-2-1 (1st in NOJHL East Division)
Playoffs: Defeated Kirkland Lake Gold Miners 4-0, Defeated Timmins Rock 4-0, Defeated Blind River Beavers 4-0 to win the league.

- Dryden Ice Dogs (SIJHL Champions)

Regular Season: 45-7-4-0 (1st in SIJHL)
Playoffs: Defeated Fort France Lakers 4-0, Defeated English River Miners 4-0 to win league.

== Tournament ==
=== Round Robin ===
x = Clinched championship round berth; y = Clinched first overall

DHC Round Robin
Rank	Team	League	W-OTW-L-OTL	GF	GA	Pts.
1	Trenton Golden Hawks	(Host) OJHL	2-0-0-1	15	6	7
2	Georgetown Raiders	OJHL	1-1-1-0	10	7	5
3	Powassan Voodoos	NOJHL	1-0-2-0	7	14	3
4	Dryden Ice Dogs	SIJHL	0-0-2-1	12	18	2

Tie Breaker: Head-to-Head, then 3-way +/-.

==== Results ====
Round Robin results
Game	Away team	Score	Home team	Score	Notes
1	Dryden Ice Dogs	5	Georgetown Raiders	4	OT
2	Powassan Voodoos	1	Trenton Golden Hawks	5	
3	Powassan Voodoos	4	Dryden Ice Dogs	3	
4	Trenton Golden Hawks	0	Georgetown Raiders	1	2OT
5	Georgetown Raiders	5	Powassan Voodoos	2	
6	Dryden Ice Dogs	4	Trenton Golden Hawks	10	

=== Semifinals and final ===
Championship Round
Game	Away team	Score	Home team	Score	Notes
Friday May 3
Semi-final	Powassan Voodoos	1	Georgetown Raiders	2	
Saturday May 4
Final	Georgetown Raiders	1	Trenton Golden Hawks	2	
