= Jeff McLean =

Jeff McLean may refer to:

- Jeff McLean (rugby union) (1947—2010), Australian rugby union player
- Jeff McLean (ice hockey) (born 1969), Canadian ice hockey player
