= 2013 Royal Bank Cup =

National Junior A Championship

Tournament details
- Venue: Consolidated Credit Union Place in Summerside, Prince Edward Island
- Dates: May 11, 2013 – May 19, 2013
- Host team: Summerside Western Capitals

Final positions
- Champions: Brooks Bandits (1st title)
- Runners-up: Summerside Western Capitals

Tournament statistics
- Games played: 13
- Scoring leader: Anthony Paskaruk (Brooks)

Awards
- MVP: Cam Maclise (Brooks)

The 2013 Royal Bank Cup was the 43rd Junior "A" ice hockey National Championship for the Canadian Junior Hockey League. The 2013 Royal Bank Cup marks the 43rd consecutive year a national championship has been awarded to this skill level since the breakaway of Major Junior hockey in 1970.

The five competitors competing in the Royal Bank Cup included the host Summerside Western Capitals, the winners of the Fred Page Cup (Truro Bearcats), Dudley Hewitt Cup (Minnesota Wilderness), and the top two teams from the Western Canada Cup (Champion Surrey Eagles and runner-up Brooks Bandits).

The tournament was hosted by the Summerside Western Capitals which saw the round robin begin on May 11, 2013 and the final played on May 19, 2013. Tournament games were played at the Consolidated Credit Union Place in Summerside, Prince Edward Island.

== History ==
The Royal Bank Cup in 2013 presented three historical moments. The Minnesota Wilderness, in having won the Dudley Hewitt Cup, became the first American club to compete at the Royal Bank Cup. Secondly, the 2013 final, for the first time ever, involved two teams that were not regional champions. The Summerside Western Capitals lost the Fred Page Cup to the Truro Bearcats but hosted the Royal Bank Cup, while the Brooks Bandits lost the Western Canada Cup to the Surrey Eagles and were admitted as runner-up by defeating the Yorkton Terriers due to the page playoff system. Additionally, as Brooks won the cup, they became the first team to win it without being a regional champion or host.

== Teams ==
- Summerside Western Capitals (Host)

Regular season: 43-7-2-0 (1st overall)
Playoffs: Defeated Miramichi 4-0, Defeated Woodstock 4-0, Defeated Truro 4-1 (MHL Champions), Fred Page Cup Runner-up (3-2).

- Truro Bearcats (Fred Page Cup)

Regular season: 38-9-0-5 (2nd overall)
Playoffs: Defeated Pictou County Crushers 4-3, Defeated Amherst Ramblers 4-2, Lost to Summerside Western Capitals 4-1 (MHL Runner-up), Won Fred Page Cup (4-0).

- Surrey Eagles (Western Canada Cup Winner)

Regular season: 35-13-3-5 (1st overall)
Playoffs: Defeated Langley 3-1, Defeated Chilliwack 3-0, Defeated Alberni Valley 4-0, Defeated Penticton 4-2 (BCHL Champions), Won Western Canada Cup (4-1).

- Brooks Bandits (Western Canada Cup Runner-up)

Regular season: 53-4-3 (1st overall)
Playoffs: Defeated Drumheller 4-1, Defeated Okotoks, Defeated Spruce Grove 4-1 (AJHL Champions), Western Canada Cup Runner-up (4-2).

- Minnesota Wilderness (Dudley Hewitt Cup)

Regular season: 51-3-0-2 (1st overall)
Playoffs: Defeated Minnesota Iron Rangers 4-0, Defeated Fort Frances Lakers 4-2 (SIJHL Champions), Won Dudley Hewitt Cup (3-1).

== Tournament ==
=== Round Robin ===
Royal Bank Cup Round Robin
Rank	Team	League	Ticket	W–L–OTL	GF	GA
1	x-Brooks Bandits	AJHL	Western Canada Cup #2	3-1-0	19	9
2	x-Surrey Eagles	BCHL	Western Canada Cup #1	3-1-0	19	9
3	x-Summerside Western Capitals	MHL	Host	2-1-1	14	11
4	x-Minnesota Wilderness	SIJHL	Dudley Hewitt Cup	1-3-0	9	19
5	Truro Bearcats	MHL	Fred Page Cup	1-3-0	8	21

(x-) Denotes semi-final berth.

==== Results ====
All games played at the Consolidated Credit Union Place, in Summerside, P.E.I .

Game	Team	Score	Team	Score	Notes
Saturday, May 11, 2013
1	Brooks Bandits	7	Truro Bearcats	1	Final - Shots: 27-18 BRK
2	Summerside Western Capitals	5	Minnesota Wilderness	1	Final - Shots: 26-26 EVEN
Sunday, May 12, 2013
3	Surrey Eagles	7	Truro Bearcats	0	Final - Shots: 34-24 SUR
4	Minnesota Wilderness	3	Brooks Bandits	6	Final - Shots: 32-28 BRK
Monday, May 13, 2013
5	Surrey Eagles	5	Summerside Western Capitals	4	OT Final - Shots: 47-37 SUR
Tuesday, May 14, 2013
6	Truro Bearcats	3	Minnesota Wilderness	5	Final - Shots: 23-23 EVEN
7	Summerside Western Capitals	3	Brooks Bandits	1	Final - Shots: 28-16 BRK
Wednesday, May 15, 2013
8	Minnesota Wilderness	0	Surrey Eagles	5	Final - Shots: 36-29 SUR
Thursday, May 16, 2013
9	Brooks Bandits	5	Surrey Eagles	2	Final - Shots: 36-24 BRK
10	Truro Bearcats	4	Summerside Western Capitals	2	Final - Shots: 37-21 TRU

=== Semi-final ===
Game	Team	Score	Team	Score	Notes
Saturday, May 18, 2013
11	Brooks Bandits	5	Minnesota Wilderness	4	OT Final - Shots: 29-26 BRK
12	Surrey Eagles	2	Summerside Western Capitals	3	OT Final - Shots: 52-45 SUR

=== Final ===
Game	Team	Score	Team	Score	Notes
Sunday, May 19, 2013
13	Brooks Bandits	3	Summerside Western Capitals	1	Final - Shots: 36-18 BRK

== Awards ==
Roland Mercier Trophy (Tournament MVP): Cam Maclise (Brooks Bandits)
Top Forward: Adam Tambellini (Surrey Eagles)
Top Defencemen: Devon Toews (Surrey Eagles)
Top Goaltender: Kevin Bailie (Summerside Western Capitals)
Tubby Smaltz Trophy (Sportsmanship): Mike Dietrich (Minnesota Wilderness)
Top Scorer: Anthony Paskaruk (Brooks Bandits)

== Roll of League Champions ==
AJHL: Brooks Bandits
BCHL: Surrey Eagles
CCHL: Cornwall Colts
MHL: Summerside Western Capitals
MJHL: Steinbach Pistons
NOJHL: North Bay Trappers
OJHL: St. Michael's Buzzers
QJAAAHL: Longueuil College Francais
SJHL: Yorkton Terriers
SIJHL: Minnesota Wilderness

== See also ==
- Canadian Junior A Hockey League
- Royal Bank Cup
- Western Canada Cup
- Dudley Hewitt Cup
- Fred Page Cup
