= 2014–15 OJHL season =

- League: Ontario Junior Hockey League
- Sport: Hockey
- Duration: Regular season 2014-09-05 – 2015-02-21; Playoffs; TBD – TBD
- Teams: 22
- Finals champions: Toronto Patriots

OJHL seasons
- 2013–14 OJHL 2015–16 OJHL

The 2014–15 OJHL season is the 21st season of the Ontario Junior Hockey League (OJHL) and the fifth since the league existed as two separate bodies in 2009–10. The twenty-two teams of the North, South, East and West Divisions will play 55-game schedules.

The top teams of each division played for the Frank L. Buckland Trophy, the OJHL championship. The winner of the Buckland Cup will compete in the Central Canadian Junior "A" championship, the Dudley Hewitt Cup. If successful against the winners of the Northern Ontario Junior Hockey League and Superior International Junior Hockey League, the champion would then move on to play in the Canadian Junior Hockey League championship, the 2015 Royal Bank Cup.

== Changes ==
- Toronto Lakeshore Patriots shorten their name to Toronto Patriots.

== Standings ==
Note: GP = Games played; W = Wins; L = Losses; OTL = Overtime losses; SOL = Shootout losses; GF = Goals for; GA = Goals against; PTS = Points; x = clinched playoff berth; y = clinched division title; z = clinched conference title.

Final Standings

North-East Conference
North Division
| Team | Centre | W–L–T-OTL | Points |
| xyz - Aurora Tigers | Aurora, Ontario | 44-7-0-3 | 91 |
| x - Stouffville Spirit | Stouffville, Ontario | 30-20-2-2 | 64 |
| x - Newmarket Hurricanes | Newmarket, Ontario | 23-23-3-5 | 54 |
| Pickering Panthers | Pickering, Ontario | 20-26-1-7 | 48 |
| Lindsay Muskies | Lindsay, Ontario | 18-29-1-6 | 43 |
East Division
| Team | Centre | W–L–OTL–SOL | Points |
| xy - Trenton Golden Hawks | Trenton, Ontario | 41-10-2-1 | 85 |
| x - Cobourg Cougars | Cobourg, Ontario | 36-13-1-4 | 77 |
| x - Kingston Voyageurs | Kingston, Ontario | 31-17-2-4 | 68 |
| x - Whitby Fury | Whitby, Ontario | 27-21-2-4 | 60 |
| x - Wellington Dukes | Wellington, Ontario | 27-24-0-3 | 57 |
South-West Conference
South Division
| Team | Centre | W–L–OTL–SOL | Points |
| xy - Toronto Patriots | Toronto, Ontario | 35-18-0-1 | 71 |
| x - Oakville Blades | Oakville, Ontario | 31-19-2-2 | 66 |
| x - Toronto Jr. Canadiens | Toronto, Ontario | 31-22-0-1 | 63 |
| x - North York Rangers | Toronto, Ontario | 28-24-0-2 | 58 |
| x - St. Michael's Buzzers | Toronto, Ontario | 22-23-0-9 | 53 |
| Mississauga Chargers | Mississauga, Ontario | 11-42-0-1 | 23 |
West Division
| Team | Centre | W–L–OTL–SOL | Points |
| xyz - Georgetown Raiders | Georgetown, Ontario | 37-9-3-5 | 82 |
| x - Orangeville Flyers | Orangeville, Ontario | 25-25-1-3 | 54 |
| x - Buffalo Jr. Sabres | Amherst, New York | 22-29-1-2 | 47 |
| Hamilton Red Wings | Hamilton, Ontario | 21-32-0-1 | 43 |
| Milton Icehawks | Milton, Ontario | 12-37-1-4 | 29 |
| Burlington Cougars | Burlington, Ontario | 11-41-0-2 | 24 |

Teams listed on the official league website.

Standings listed by Pointstreak on official league website.

== 2015 Frank L. Buckland Trophy Playoffs ==
Playoff results are listed by Pointstreak on the official league website.

== Dudley Hewitt Cup Championship ==
Hosted by the Fort Frances Lakers in Fort Frances, Ontario.

== Scoring leaders ==
Note: GP = Games played; G = Goals; A = Assists; Pts = Points; PIM = Penalty minutes

| Player / Team / GP / G / A / Pts / PIM |

== Leading goaltenders ==
Note: GP = Games played; Mins = Minutes played; W = Wins; L = Losses: OTL = Overtime losses; SL = Shootout losses; GA = Goals Allowed; SO = Shutouts; GAA = Goals against average

| Player / Team / GP / Mins / W / L / OTL / SOL / GA / SO / Sv% / GAA |

== Award winners ==
- Top Scorer -
- Best Defenceman -
- Most Gentlemanly Player -
- Most Improved Player -
- Most Valuable Player -
- Rookie of the Year -
- Coach of the Year -
- Best Goaltender -
- Humanitarian -
- Scholastic -
- Top Prospect -
- Playoff MVP -
- Top Executive -
- Top Trainer -
- Volunteer of the Year -

== Players selected in 2015 NHL entry draft ==
To be decided at the end of the 2014-15 NHL season.

== See also ==
- 2015 Royal Bank Cup
- Dudley Hewitt Cup
- List of OJHL seasons
- Northern Ontario Junior Hockey League
- Superior International Junior Hockey League
- Greater Ontario Junior Hockey League
- 2014 in ice hockey
- 2015 in ice hockey

| Preceded by 2013–14 OJHL season | OJHL seasons | Succeeded by 2015–16 OJHL season |
