= 2016 Dudley Hewitt Cup =

Central Region Jr A Championship

Tournament details
- Venue: Joe Mavrinac Community Complex in Kirkland Lake
- Host team: Kirkland Lake Gold Miners

Final positions
- Champions: Trenton Golden Hawks
- Runners-up: Soo Thunderbirds

Tournament statistics
- Games played: 8

The 2016 Dudley Hewitt Cup was the 45th Central Canadian Jr. A Ice Hockey championship for the Canadian Junior Hockey League. The winners went on to represent the central region in the 2016 Royal Bank Cup in Lloydminster, Saskatechewan.

== Teams ==
- Trenton Golden Hawks (OJHL Champions)

Regular Season: 44-6-1-3 (1st OJHL East Division)
Playoffs: Defeated Newmarket Hurricanes (4-0), Defeated Wellington Dukes (4-1), Defeated Kingston Voyageurs (4-0), Defeated Georgetown Raiders (4-1) to win the league

- Kirkland Lake Gold Miners (Host)

Regular Season: 39-12-2-1 (3rd in NOJHL East Division
Playoffs: Defeated Defeated Powassan Voodoos 4-2, Defeated Cochrane Crunch 4-1, Defeated by Soo Thunderbirds 4-0.

- Soo Thunderbirds (NOJHL Champions)

Regular Season: 47-6-1-0 (1st in NOJHL West Division)
Playoffs: Defeated Soo Eagles 4-0, Defeated Elliot Lake Wildcats 4-1, Defeated Kirkland Lake Gold Miners 4-0 to win the league.

- Fort Frances Lakers (SIJHL Champions)

Regular Season: 46-8-0-2 (1st in SIJHL)
Playoffs: Defeated English River Miners 4-0, Defeated Dryden Ice Dogs to win league.

== Tournament ==
=== Round Robin ===
x = Clinched championship round berth; y = Clinched first overall

DHC Round Robin
Rank	Team	League	W-OTW-L-OTL	GF	GA	Pts.
1	Trenton Golden Hawks	OJHL	3-0-0-0	12	3	9
2	Soo Thunderbirds	NOJHL	2-0-1-0	11	11	6
3	Kirkland Lake Gold Miners	NOJHL	1-0-2-0	11	13	3
4	Fort Frances Lakers	SIJHL	0-0-3-0	10	17	0

Tie Breaker: Head-to-Head, then 3-way +/-.

==== Results ====
Round Robin results
Game	Away team	Score	Home team	Score	Notes
1	Trenton Golden Hawks	4	Soo Thunderbirds	2	
2	Fort Frances Lakers	5	Kirkland Lake Gold Miners	8	
3	Soo Thunderbirds	6	Fort Frances Lakers	5	
4	Trenton Golden Hawks	5	Kirkland Lake Gold Miners	1	
5	Fort Frances Lakers	0	Trenton Golden Hawks	3	
6	Kirkland Lake Gold Miners	2	Soo Thunderbirds	3	

=== Semifinals and finals ===
Championship Round
Game	Away team	Score	Home team	Score	Notes
Friday May 3
Semi-final	Kirkland Lake Gold Miners	1	Soo Thunderbirds	4	
Saturday May 4
Final	Soo Thunderbirds	0	Trenton Golden Hawks	4	
