= Barry Wilcox =

Barry Wilcox may refer to:

- Barry Wilcox (ice hockey)
- Barry Wilcox (cyclist)
