= 2016 Royal Bank Cup =

National Junior A Championship

Tournament details
- Venue: Lloydminster Centennial Civic Centre in Lloydminster, Saskatchewan
- Dates: May 14, 2016 – May 22, 2016
- Teams: 5 (4 regional champions + host)
- Host team: Lloydminster Bobcats

Final positions
- Champions: West Kelowna Warriors
- Runners-up: Lloydminster Bobcats

Tournament statistics
- Games played: 13
- Scoring leader: Cale Makar (Brooks)

Awards
- MVP: Cale Makar (Brooks)

The 2016 Royal Bank Cup was the 46th Canadian junior A Ice Hockey National Championship for the Canadian Junior Hockey League. It was the 46th consecutive year a national championship was awarded to this skill level since the breakaway of Major Junior hockey in 1970. Hockey Canada junior hockey council chairman Brent Ladds served as chairman of the 2016 Royal Bank Cup organizing committee.

== Teams ==
- Lloydminster Bobcats (Host)

Regular Season: 44-14-2 (3rd AJHL North Division)
Playoffs: Defeated Drayton Valley (3-0), Defeated Whitecourt (4-0), Defeated by Spruce Grove (4-1).

- West Kelowna Warriors (Western #1)

Regular Season: 38-17-2-1 (2nd BCHL Interior Division)
Playoffs: Defeated Salmon Arm (4-2), Defeated Penticton (4-2), Finished 2nd BCHL Round 3 (3-3), Defeated Chilliwack (4-2), Won Western Canada Cup (4-1)

- Brooks Bandits (Western #2)

Regular Season: 49-9-2 (1st AJHL South Division)
Playoffs: Defeated Canmore (4-0), Defeated Camrose (4-0), Defeated Spruce Grove (4-1), Finished 2nd at Western Canada Cup (5-1)

- Trenton Golden Hawks (Central)

Regular Season: 44-6-1-3 (1st OJHL East Division)
Playoffs: Defeated Newmarket (4-0), Defeated Wellington (4-1), Defeated Kingston (4-0), Defeated Georgetown (4-1), Won Dudley Hewitt Cup (4-0)

- Carleton Place Canadians (Eastern)

Regular Season: 43-16-2-1 (1st CCHL Robinson Division)
Playoffs: Defeated Pembroke (4-1), Defeated Brockville (4-0), Defeated Ottawa (4-3), Won Fred Page Cup (4-0)

== Tournament ==
=== Round Robin ===
Royal Bank Cup Round Robin
Rank	Team	League	Ticket	W–OTW-OTL-L	GF	GA	Pts
1	Trenton Golden Hawks	OJHL	Central	3-0-1-0	13	8	10
2	Brooks Bandits	AJHL	West 2	3-0-0-1	16	11	9
3	West Kelowna Warriors	BCHL	West 1	2-1-0-1	14	11	8
4	Lloydminster Bobcats	AJHL	Host	0-1-0-3	10	16	2
5	Carleton Place Canadians	CCHL	East	0-0-1-3	9	16	1

==== Schedule and results ====
All games played in Lloydminster, SK.

Game	Away team	Score	Home team	Score	Notes
May 14, 2016
1	Brooks Bandits	2	Trenton Golden Hawks	3	Final - Shots 31-22 BRO
2	West Kelowna Warriors	5	Lloydminster Bobcats	2	Final - Shots 35-30 LLO
May 15, 2016
3	Trenton Golden Hawks	3	Carleton Place Canadians	1	Final - Shots 41-21 TRE
4	West Kelowna Warriors	1	Brooks Bandits	5	Final - Shots 46-37 BRO
May 16, 2016
5	Lloydminster Bobcats	4	Carleton Place Canadians	3 OT	Final - Shots 43-29 LLO
May 17, 2016
6	Trenton Golden Hawks	3	West Kelowna Warriors	4 SO	Final - Shots 35-34 TRE
7	Brooks Bandits	4	Lloydminster Bobcats	3	Final - Shots 29-27 LLO
May 18, 2016
8	Carleton Place Canadians	1	West Kelowna Warriors	4	Final - Shots 32-20 WKW
May 19, 2016
9	Carleton Place Canadians	4	Brooks Bandits	5	Final - Shots 40-27 BRO
10	Lloydminster Bobcats	1	Trenton Golden Hawks	4	Final - Shots 35-28 LLO

==== Semifinal Results ====
Game	Away team	Score	Home team	Score	Notes
May 21, 2016
SF1	Lloydminster Bobcats	6	Trenton Golden Hawks	2	Final - Shots 38-20 LLO
SF2	West Kelowna Warriors	4	Brooks Bandits	1	Final - Shots 34-32 BRO

==== Final results ====
Game	Away team	Score	Home team	Score	Notes
May 22, 2016
Final	Lloydminster Bobcats	0	West Kelowna Warriors	4	Final - 48-27 LLO

== Awards ==
Roland Mercier Trophy (Tournament MVP): Cale Makar, Brooks
Top Forward: Bryce Van Horn, Carleton Place
Top Defencemen: Cale Makar, Brooks
Top Goaltender: Daniel Urbani, Trenton
Tubby Schmalz Trophy (Sportsmanship): Christian Lloyd, Lloydminster
Top Scorer: Cale Makar, Brooks

== Roll of League Champions ==
AJHL: Brooks Bandits
BCHL: West Kelowna Warriors
CCHL: Carleton Place Canadians
MHL: Pictou County Crushers
MJHL: Portage Terriers
NOJHL: Soo Thunderbirds
OJHL: Trenton Golden Hawks
QJHL: Longueuil Collège Français
SJHL: Melfort Mustangs
SIJHL: Fort Frances Lakers
