= Surrey Eagles =

Junior ice hockey team

- City: Surrey, British Columbia, Canada
- League: British Columbia Hockey League
- Division: Coastal
- Founded: 1962
- Home arena: South Surrey Arena
- Colours: Oxford blue Spanish green
- General manager: Brian Passmore
- Head coach: Brian Passmore
- Website: surreyeagles.net

Franchise history
- 1962–1971: New Westminster Royals
- 1981–1983: New Westminster Royals
- 1988–1991: New Westminster Royals
- 1991–1996: Surrey Eagles
- 1996–2003: South Surrey Eagles
- 2003–present: Surrey Eagles

Championships
- League champions: 6

The Surrey Eagles are a junior ice hockey team based in Surrey, British Columbia, Canada. They are members of the Coastal East Division of the British Columbia Hockey League (BCHL). They play their home games at South Surrey Arena.

The Eagles franchise has won the Fred Page Cup, the BCHL championship, 6 times, once as New Westminster in 1990, and five times in Surrey, in 1997, 1998, 2005, 2013, and 2024. They are also one time national champions, winning the Royal Bank Cup in 1997.

== History ==
=== New Westminster Royals ===
New Westminster was home to several professional ice hockey teams, all named the New Westminster Royals, in the 1910s, 1940s, and 1950s. In 1962, a New Westminster Royals junior ice hockey team joined the Pacific Coast Junior Hockey League (PCJHL). After the Royals won five straight league championships, the PCJHL merged with the British Columbia Junior Hockey League (BCJHL) in 1967. They were Abbott Cup finalists in 1967 during the 1967 Memorial Cup playdowns. In 1971, the now Junior A Royals franchise went dormant when the major junior Western Canada Hockey League's Estevan franchise relocated and became the New Westminster Bruins. In 1981 the Bruins left New Westminster, and the Royals were reactivated for two seasons. In 1983, a different major junior Bruins' team relocated from Nanaimo to New Westminster, and the Royals again went dormant. In 1988, the Bruins left, and the Royals were reactivated. The Royals won the 1989–90 Fred Page Cup as BCHL playoff champions.

Future NHL star Cliff Ronning was a notable early 1980s Royals' squad member. Future convicted fraudster Frank Biller played for the Royals from 1988 to 1990.

=== Surrey ===
In 1991, the New Westminster Royals relocated to Surrey, British Columbia. The Eagles did not make it past the quarterfinals in the playoffs for the first four seasons in South Surrey. In 1997, their fifth season, the Eagles finished with a record of 47–7–6 for 100 points and won the BCHL championship by defeating the Vernon Vipers in the Subway Cup. The Eagles beat the Rocky Mountain Junior Hockey League champions Cranbrook Colts and the Fort McMurray Oil Barons of the Alberta Junior Hockey League to earn a berth in the Royal Bank Cup. In the tournament, held in Summerside, Prince Edward Island, the Eagles went 3–1 in the round-robin and beat the Kanata Valley Lasers 4–2 in the semifinal before losing to the host Summerside Western Capitals 4–3 in the championship game.

In the following 1997–98 season, the South Surrey Eagles won the Royal Bank Cup with the tournament held in Nanaimo, British Columbia, defeating the Weyburn Red Wings 4–1 in the final.

The Eagles' following seasons not as were successful, losing the Coastal Conference finals to the Chilliwack Chiefs in 7 games in 1999. They led that series 3-1 and lost game 7 in overtime. They then missed the playoffs the next season(1999/2000). The following season 2000-2001 they lost in the 2nd round to the Victoria Salsa. In the 2001/2002 season they lost in the coastal conference semi-finals 3-0 to the Chilliwack Chiefs. The next season 02/03 they saw more success but ended up losing in the Coastal Conference finals to the Chilliwack Chiefs. They returned to the Conference finals again in 03/04 but were defeated by the Nanaimo Clippers. The Eagles won the league title in 2005 over the Vernon Vipers four games to one. In the 2005 Doyle Cup series, they lost to the Camrose Kodiaks four games to one.

In 2012–13, the Eagles won the British Columbia Hockey League championship by defeating the Penticton Vees in six games. They then won the inaugural Western Canada Cup with a 4–2 win over the Brooks Bandits in the championship game. At the Royal Bank Cup, the Surrey Eagles went 3–1 in the round-robin to finish in second place but lost to the host Summerside Western Capitals in overtime in the semifinal game.

In 2024, the Eagles beat the Penticton Vees in six games to win the BCHL Fred Page Cup championship. The Brooks Bandits then defeated the Eagles two games to none to win the Rocky Mountain Challenge.

== Season-by-season record ==
Note: GP = Games played, W = Wins, L = Losses, T = Ties, OTL = Overtime Losses, Pts = Points, GF = Goals for, GA = Goals against, PIM = Penalties in minutes

Season	GP	W	L	T	OTL	GF	GA	Pts	PIM	Finish	Playoffs
New Westminster Royals
1962–63 to 1966–67	New Westminster Royals PCJHL statistics not available										
1967–68	40	15	23	2	—	186	234	32		5th, BCJHL	did not qualify
1968–69	40	10	23	7	—	158	200	27		5th, BCJHL	did not qualify
1969–70	48	2	44	2	—	151	320	6		7th, BCJHL	did not qualify
1970–71	60	25	29	6	—	261	270	56		3rd, Central	Lost in Quarterfinals, 2–4 (Centennials)
1971–72 to 1980–81	dormant during existence of major junior New Westminster Bruins										
1981–82	48	39	9	0	—	362	196	78		1st, Coastal	Lost in Finals, 1–4 (Knights)
1982–83	56	41	14	1	—	363	246	83		2nd, Coastal	Lost in Semifinals, 2–4 (Flyers)
1983–84 to 1987–88	dormant during second iteration of major junior New Westminster Bruins										
1988–89	60	45	14	1	—	458	283	91		1st, Coastal	Lost in Finals, 1–4 (Lakers)
1989–90	59	52	3	4	—	444	181	108		1st, Coastal	Fred Page Cup Champions, 4–2 (Lakers); Mowat Cup, Doyle Cup, Abbott Cup Champions
1990–91	60	38	21	1	—	310	236	77		1st, Coastal	Lost in Quarterfinals, 1–4 (Warriors)
Surrey Eagles
1991–92	60	22	37	1	—	256	356	45		5th, Coastal	did not qualify
1992–93	60	29	26	5	—	328	288	71		2nd, Coastal	Lost in Quarterfinals, 1–4 (Clippers)
1993–94	60	29	30	1	—	289	324	59		3rd, Coastal	Lost in Quarterfinals, 1–4 (Capitals)
1994–95	60	37	21	2	—	316	259	76		3rd, Mainland	Lost in Quarterfinals, 2–4 (Chiefs)
1995–96	60	32	27	1	—	267	276	65		3rd, Mainland	Lost in Preliminary, 0–2 (Centennials)
1996–97	60	47	7	6	—	374	178	100		1st, Coastal	Fred Page Cup Champions, 4–1 (Vipers); Mowat Cup, Doyle Cup, Abbott Cup Champions
1997–98	60	43	15	2	—	322	200	88		1st, Coastal	Fred Page Cup Champions, 4–1 (Panthers); Mowat Cup, Doyle Cup, Abbott Cup, RBC Cup Champions
1998–99	60	40	19	—	1	323	244	81		1st, Mainland	Lost in Division Finals, 3–4 (Chiefs)
1999–00	60	27	27	6	—	258	283	60		4th, Mainland	did not qualify
2000–01	60	29	22	9	—	247	247	67		3rd, Mainland	Lost in Quarterfinals, 0–3 (Salsa)
2001–02	60	31	24	5	—	251	263	67		2nd, Mainland	Lost in Quarterfinals, 0–3 (Chiefs)
2002–03	60	29	24	1	6	211	209	65		3rd, Mainland	Lost in Semifinals, 1–4 (Chiefs)
2003–04	60	38	16	1	5	276	212	82	2275	1st, Mainland	Lost in Semifinals, 0–4 (Clippers)
2004–05	60	37	18	0	5	246	194	79	1859	1st, Mainland	Fred Page Cup Champions, 4–1 (Vipers); Mowat Cup Champions
2005–06	60	16	39	2	3	163	259	37	1236	4th, Mainland	did not qualify
2006–07	60	17	39	1	3	192	288	38	1008	8th, Coastal	Lost in Preliminary, 1–4 (Clippers)
2007–08	60	33	23	1	3	234	213	70	994	3rd, Coastal	Lost in Preliminary, 1–3 (Kings)
2008–09	60	28	25	1	6	199	205	63	1034	3rd, Mainland	Lost in Division Semifinals, 1–4 (Kings)
2009–10	60	30	24	0	6	196	190	66	1076	5th, Coastal	Lost in Division Quarterfinals, 2–4 (Chiefs)
2010–11	60	35	22	1	2	216	187	73		2nd, Coastal	Lost division finals, 2–4 Kings
2011–12	60	36	15	2	7	217	187	81		2nd, Coastal	Lost division finals, 1–4 Kings
2012–13	56	35	13	3	5	195	149	78		1st, Mainland	Fred Page Cup Champions, 4–2 (Vees); Western Canada Cup Champions (Brooks Bandits) (Note: 2013 Western Canada Cup 3–1–0 round-robin second place – advanced to finals and defeated Brooks Bandits 4–1.); Royal Bank Cup lost semifinals (Summerside) (Note: 2013 Royal Bank Cup 3–1–0 round-robin second place – advance to semifinals and lost to Summerside Western Capitals 3–2 (OT).)
2013–14	58	25	30	1	2	201	232	53		4th, Mainland	Lost div. semi-finals, 2–4 (Rivermen)
2014–15	58	9	45	1	3	144	285	22		5th, Mainland	did not qualify
2015–16	58	7	48	1	2	139	308	17		6th, Mainland; 17th, BCHL	did not qualify
2016–17	58	18	36	4	0	187	269	40		5th of 6, Mainland; 16th of 17, BCHL	did not qualify
2017–18	58	26	22	8	2	189	208	62		3rd of 5, Mainland; 10th of 17, BCHL	Won Div. Semifinals, 4–2 (Rivermen); Lost Div. Finals, 3–4 (Spruce Kings)
2018–19	58	13	41	—	4	143	259	30	761	5th of 5, Mainland; 17th of 17, BCHL	did not qualify
2019–20	58	27	23	0	8	178	176	62	686	3rd of 5, Mainland; 11th of 17, BCHL	Won First Round, 4–3 (Chiefs); Season cancelled due to the COVID-19 Pandemic
2020–21	20	17	2	1	0	102	44	35	224	1st of 3, Coquitlam Pod; 2nd of 16, BCHL	Covid-19 "pod season" - no playoffs
2021–22	54	28	26	0	0	165	170	56	465	6th of 9, Coastal; 12th of 18, BCHL	Lost division quarterfinals, 0-4 (Clippers)
2022–23	54	35	16	0	3	200	151	73	350	2nd of 9, Coastal; 4th of 18, BCHL	Won division quarterfinals, 4–1 (Kings); Lost division semifinals, 3–4 (Bulldogs)
2023–24	54	44	8	0	2	225	128	90		1st of 9, Coastal; 1st of 18, BCHL	Won division quarterfinals, 4-1 (Capitals)Won division semifinals, 4-2 (Grizzlies) Won league semifinals, 4-3 (Bulldogs) Fred Page Cup Champions, 4-2 (Vees) Lost Rocky Mountain Challenge, 0-2 (Bandits)
2024–25	54	31	18	5	0	206	182	57	655	2nd of 10, Coastal; 7th of 21, BCHL	Lost Div Quarterfinals, 1-4 (Bulldogs)
2025-26	54	8	40	0	6	142	283	22	833	5th of 5, Coastal West; 10th of 10, Coastal; 20th of 20, BCHL	Did not qualify

== NHL alumni ==
- Mike Bishai
- Andrew Hammond
- Danton Heinen
- Tyler Eckford
- Jakub Ficenec
- Colton Gillies
- Scott Gomez
- Scott Hannan
- Mark Janssens
- Andrew Kozek
- Jordan Krestanovich
- Rick Lanz
- Ben Maxwell
- Jack McIlhargey
- Jeff McLean
- Mike Moore
- T. J. Mulock
- John Negrin
- John Olver
- Nathan Oystrick
- Cliff Ronning
- Dustin Slade
- Brandon Tanev
- Devon Toews
- Ryan Watson
- Barry Wilcox

== Awards and trophies ==
Royal Bank Cup

- 1998

Western Canada Cup

- 2013

Abbott Cup

- 1998
- 1997
- 1990

Doyle Cup

- 1998
- 1997
- 1990

Mowat Cup

- 2005
- 1998
- 1997
- 1990

Fred Page Cup

- 2024
- 2013
- 2005
- 1998
- 1997
- 1990

Cliff McNabb Memorial Trophy

- 2013
- 2005
- 1998
- 1997
- 1990
- 1989
- 1982

Ron Boileau Memorial Trophy

- 2024
- 2013

Chevrolet Cup

- 1997
- 1990
- 1989

Top Goaltender Trophy

- Michael Santaguida: 2013
- Bob Bell: 1991
- Cory Cadden: 1990

Brett Hull Trophy

- John McNabb: 1999
- Shane Kuss: 1997
- Mark Karpen: 1990
- Jeff McLean: 1989

Wally Forslund Memorial Trophy

- Peter Wishloff/Chris Peck: 1997
- Bob Bell/Todd Jones: 1991
- Cory Cadden/Todd Jones: 1990

Joe Tennant Memorial Trophy

- Mark Holick: 1999
- Rick Lanz: 1997
- Pat Smith: 1993
- Harvey Smyl: 1991
- John Olver: 1990

Bob Fenton Trophy

- Scott Knowles: 2008
- Shane Kuss: 1997

Top Defenceman Trophy

- Brian Drapluk : 2014
- Devon Toews : 2013
- Nathan Oystrick: 2002
- Jacob Ficenec: 1998
- Derry Menard: 1991

Vern Dye Memorial Trophy

- John McNabb: 1999
- Greg Hadden: 1991
- Jeff McLean: 1989

Bruce Allison Memorial Trophy

- Scott Gomez: 1997

== See also ==
- List of ice hockey teams in British Columbia

Preceded by Summerside Western Capitals	Royal Bank Cup Champions; 1998	Succeeded by Vernon Vipers
