= Jakub Ficenec =

Czech-German ice hockey player

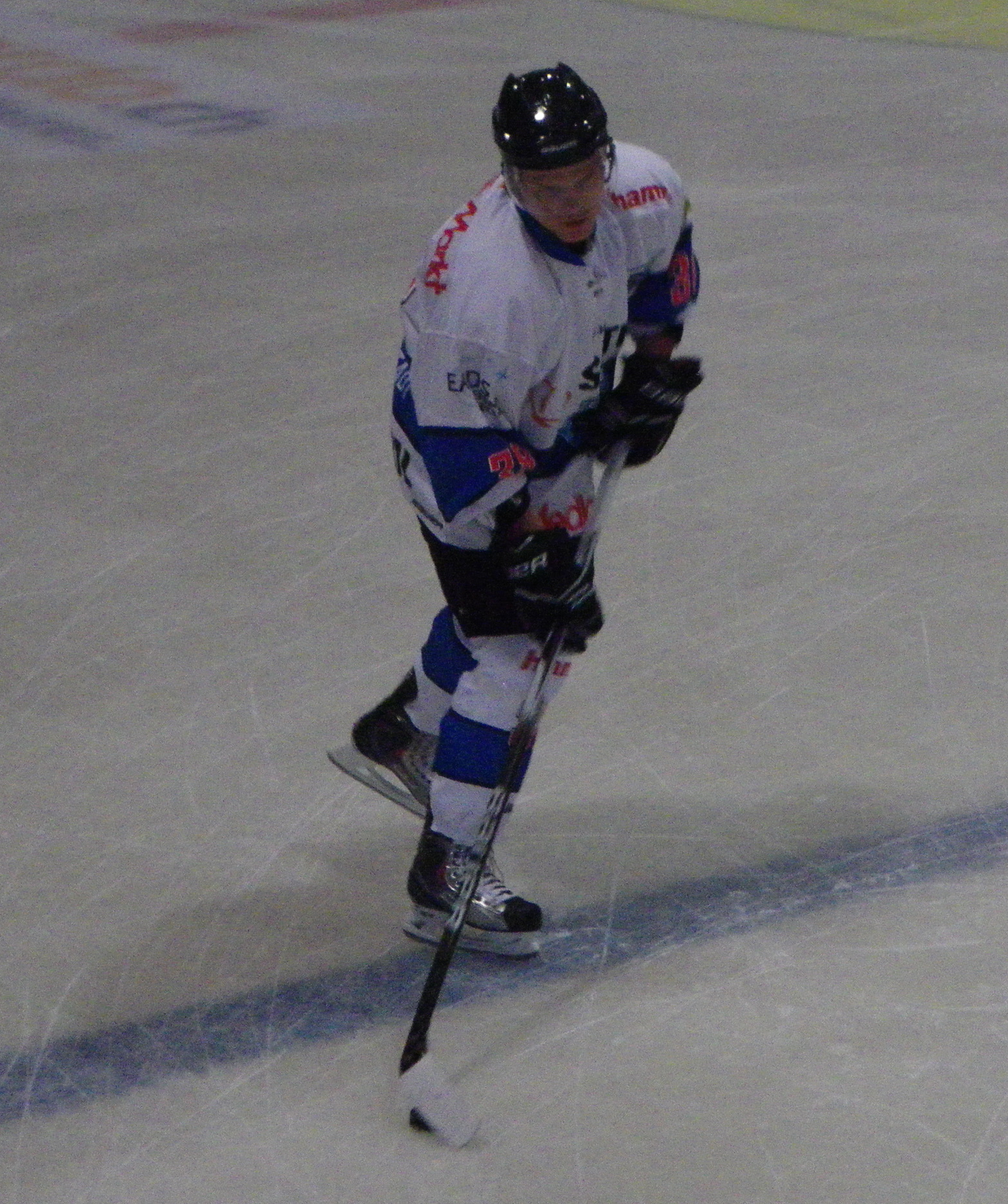
- Born: February 11, 1977 (age 48) Hradec Králové, Czechoslovakia
- Height: 5 ft 10 in (178 cm)
- Weight: 196 lb (89 kg; 14 st 0 lb)
- Position: Defense
- Shot: Right
- DEL team Former teams: Düsseldorfer EG; HC Slavia Praha; Augsburger Panther; ERC Ingolstadt
- National team: Germany
- Playing career: 1996–2015

Jakub Ficenec (born February 11, 1977) is a Czech-German professional ice hockey defenceman currently playing for Düsseldorfer EG of the Deutsche Eishockey Liga (DEL).

== Playing career ==
Ficenec made his professional debut during the 1993–94 season, appearing in two games in the Czech Extraliga. In 1995–96 he appeared in three games with HC Slavia Praha.

Beginning in 1996, Ficenec played five season in North America. He played two seasons of junior ice hockey with the South Surrey Eagles of the British Columbia Hockey League. During the 1998–99 season he made his American professional debut, playing 59 games with the Johnstown Chiefs of the ECHL, and five with the Portland Pirates of the American Hockey League. The next two seasons he played in Portland.

In 2001, he began playing in the German league with the Augsburger Panthers. The next season, he played with DEG Metro Stars. In 2003, he joined ERC Ingolstadt.

Ficenec competed at the 2010 Winter Olympics as a member of the Germany men's national ice hockey team.

== Career statistics ==
=== Regular season and playoffs ===
			Regular season					Playoffs
Season	Team	League	GP	G	A	Pts	PIM	GP	G	A	Pts	PIM
1991–92	TJ Stadion Hradec Králové	TCH U18	33	9	13	22		—	—	—	—	—
1993–94	HC Stadion Hradec Králové	ELH	2	0	0	0	0	—	—	—	—	—
1995–96	HC Slavia Praha	ELH	3	0	0	0	0	—	—	—	—	—
1996–97	South Surrey Eagles	BCHL	59	28	60	88	90	—	—	—	—	—
1997–98	South Surrey Eagles	BCHL	55	35	56	91	121	—	—	—	—	—
1998–99	Johnstown Chiefs	ECHL	59	18	23	41	54	—	—	—	—	—
1998–99	Portland Pirates	AHL	5	3	2	5	4	—	—	—	—	—
1999–2000	Portland Pirates	AHL	58	11	9	20	32	4	0	0	0	4
2000–01	Portland Pirates	AHL	62	10	16	26	41	3	0	1	1	2
2001–02	Augsburger Panther	DEL	57	8	29	37	134	4	0	1	1	4
2002–03	DEG Metro Stars	DEL	41	9	19	28	61	5	0	2	2	4
2003–04	ERC Ingolstadt	DEL	51	13	19	32	60	8	4	2	6	31
2004–05	ERC Ingolstadt	DEL	46	16	26	42	50	11	3	4	7	28
2005–06	ERC Ingolstadt	DEL	46	13	22	35	121	7	4	2	6	14
2006–07	ERC Ingolstadt	DEL	48	11	34	45	97	5	0	1	1	6
2007–08	ERC Ingolstadt	DEL	51	8	31	39	44	3	1	1	2	6
2008–09	ERC Ingolstadt	DEL	42	11	19	30	56	—	—	—	—	—
2009–10	ERC Ingolstadt	DEL	51	4	24	28	36	10	4	2	6	2
2010–11	ERC Ingolstadt	DEL	51	11	31	42	36	—	—	—	—	—
2011–12	ERC Ingolstadt	DEL	34	7	15	22	28	9	0	1	1	6
2012–13	ERC Ingolstadt	DEL	40	5	14	19	24	4	0	0	0	4
2013–14	ERC Ingolstadt	DEL	34	2	15	17	41	9	0	0	0	4
2014–15	Düsseldorfer EG	DEL	43	3	10	13	26	10	0	0	0	4
DEL totals			635	121	308	429	814	85	16	16	32	113

=== International ===
Year	Team	Event	GP	G	A	Pts	PIM
1995	Czech Republic	EJC	5	0	0	0	0
2010	Germany	OG	4	0	0	0	4
Junior totals			5	0	0	0	0
Senior totals			4	0	0	0	4
