= 2017 Western Canada Cup =

The 2017 Western Canada Cup was the Western Canadian Junior A ice hockey championship played at the South Okanagan Events Centre in Penticton, British Columbia from April 29 to May 7, 2017. It determined the two Western seeds for the 2017 Royal Bank Cup. Hockey Canada confirmed after the tournament's conclusion that the all-Western format was being scrapped and that the four participating leagues would resume their Doyle and Anavet Cup rivalries, making this the final Western Canada Cup.

== Round robin ==
WCC Round Robin
Rank	Team	League	W-OTW-L-OTL	GF	GA	Pts.
1	Brooks Bandits	AJHL	3-1-0-0	18	6	11
2	Chilliwack Chiefs	BCHL	2-0-2-0	8	11	6
3	Penticton Vees	Host	1-1-1-1	10	10	6
4	Battlefords North Stars	SJHL	1-0-2-1	8	11	4
5	Portage Terriers	MJHL	1-0-3-0	9	15	3

Tie Breaker: Head-to-Head, then 3-way +/-.

=== Results ===
Round Robin results
Game	Away Team	Score	Home Team	Score	Notes
1	Brooks	5	Chilliwack	2	April 29
2	Battlefords	1	Penticton	2 OT	April 29
3	Portage	5	Battlefords	3	April 30
4	Penticton	1	Brooks	2 OT	April 30
5	Chilliwack	2	Portage	1	May 1
6	Brooks	4	Battlefords	1	May 2
7	Chilliwack	4	Penticton	2	May 2
8	Portage	0	Brooks	5	May 3
9	Battlefords	3	Chilliwack	0	May 4
10	Penticton	5	Portage	3	May 4

=== Semi and Finals ===
Championship Round
Game	Away Team	Score	Home Team	Score	Notes
Semi-final	Battlefords	0	Penticton	4	May 6
Final	Chilliwack	1	Brooks	6	May 6
Runner-Up	Penticton	3	Chilliwack	2	May 7

== See also ==
- 2017 Royal Bank Cup
- Western Canada Cup
