= 2016 Western Canada Cup =

The 2016 Western Canada Cup was the Western Canadian Junior A ice hockey championship played at Affinity Place in Estevan, Saskatchewan from April 30 to May 8, 2016. It determined the two Western seeds for the 2016 Royal Bank Cup, the West Kelowna Warriors and Brooks Bandits.

== Round robin ==
WCC Round Robin
Rank	Team	League	W-L-OTW-OTL	GF	GA	Pts.
1	Brooks Bandits	AJHL	4-0-0-0	22	9	12
2	West Kelowna Warriors	BCHL	2-1-1-0	12	7	8
3	Portage Terriers	MJHL	2-1-0-1	10	15	7
4	Melfort Mustangs	SJHL	1-3-0-0	4	10	3
5	Estevan Bruins	Host	0-4-0-0	7	14	0

Tie Breaker: Head-to-Head, then 3-way +/-.

=== Results ===
Round Robin results
Game	Away Team	Score	Home Team	Score	Notes
1	Portage	2	Melfort	1	Final
2	West Kelowna	3	Estevan	0	Final
3	Brooks	4	West Kelowna	2	Final
4	Estevan	2	Portage	3	Final
5	Melfort	0	Brooks	3	Final
6	Portage	2	West Kelowna	3	OT Final
7	Melfort	2	Estevan	1	Final
8	Brooks	9	Portage	3	Final
9	West Kelowna	4	Melfort	1	Final
10	Estevan	4	Brooks	6	Final

Schedule and results can be found on the official website.

=== Semi and Finals ===
Championship Round
Game	Away Team	Score	Home Team	Score	Notes
Semi-final	Melfort	2	Portage	3	OT Final
Final	West Kelowna	6	Brooks	0	Final
Runner-Up	Portage	1	Brooks	2	Final

== See also ==
- 2016 Royal Bank Cup
- Western Canada Cup
