= 1998 Royal Bank Cup =

Tournament details
- Venue(s): Nanaimo, British Columbia
- Dates: May 2, 1998 – May 10, 1998
- Teams: 5

Final positions
- Champions: South Surrey Eagles (1st title)
- Runners-up: Weyburn Red Wings

Tournament statistics
- Games played: 13
- Scoring leader: Kris Wilson (South Surrey)

Awards
- MVP: Peter Wishloff (South Surrey)

The 1998 Royal Bank Cup is the 28th Junior "A" 1998 ice hockey National Championship for the Canadian Junior A Hockey League.

The Royal Bank Cup was competed for by the winners of the Doyle Cup, Anavet Cup, Dudley Hewitt Cup, the Fred Page Cup and a host city.

The tournament was hosted by the Nanaimo Clippers and Nanaimo, British Columbia.

== The Playoffs ==
=== Round Robin ===
Pos	League (Ticket)	Team	Pld	W	L	GF	GA	GD	Qualification
1	BCHL (Doyle Cup)	South Surrey Eagles	4	4	0	14	4	+10	Semi-final
2	BCHL (Host)	Nanaimo Clippers	4	3	1	12	8	+4	Semi-final
3	SJHL (Anavet Cup)	Weyburn Red Wings	4	2	2	16	13	+3	Semi-final
4	OPJHL (Dudley Hewitt Cup)	Milton Merchants	4	1	3	11	15	−4	Semi-final
5	CJHL (Fred Page Cup)	Brockville Braves	4	0	4	11	17	−6	

==== Results ====
Nanaimo Clippers defeat Milton Merchants 6–2
South Surrey Eagles defeat Weyburn Red Wings 6–2 for the Abbott Cup
Nanaimo Clippers defeat Brockville Braves 4–3 in Overtime
Weyburn Red Wings defeat Brockville Braves 5–1
South Surrey Eagles defeat Milton Merchants 3–0
Milton Merchants defeat Brockville Braves 5–2
Weyburn Red Wings defeat Milton Merchants 6–2
South Surrey Eagles defeat Nanaimo Clippers 4–0
South Surrey Eagles defeat Brockville Braves 9–2
Nanaimo Clippers defeat Weyburn Red Wings 5–2

=== Semi-finals and Final ===
Semi-finals
1	South Surrey Eagles	6
4	Milton Merchants	2
2	Nanaimo Clippers	1
3	Weyburn Red Wings	4

Royal Bank Cup Finals
1	South Surrey Eagles	4
3	Weyburn Red Wings	1

== Awards ==
Most Valuable Player: Peter Wishloff (South Surrey Eagles)
Top Scorer: Kris Wilson (South Surrey Eagles)
Most Sportsmanlike Player: Kirk Feasey (Weyburn Red Wings)
Top Goalie: Peter Wishloff (South Surrey Eagles)
Top forward: Kris Wilson (South Surrey Eagles)
Top Defenceman: Robin Sochan (Nanaimo Clippers)

== Roll of League Champions ==
AJHL: St. Albert Saints
BCHL: South Surrey Eagles
CJHL: Brockville Braves
MJHL: Winkler Flyers
MJAHL: Restigouche River Rats
MetJHL: Wexford Raiders
NOJHL: Rayside-Balfour Sabrecats
OPJHL: Milton Merchants
QJAAAHL: Coaticook Frontaliers
RMJHL: Cranbrook Colts
SJHL: Weyburn Red Wings

== See also ==
- Canadian Junior A Hockey League
- Royal Bank Cup
- Anavet Cup
- Doyle Cup
- Dudley Hewitt Cup
- Fred Page Cup
- Abbott Cup
- Mowat Cup
