= Steven King (ice hockey) =

American ice hockey player (born 1969)

- Born: July 22, 1969 (age 57) East Greenwich, Rhode Island, U.S.
- Height: 6 ft 1 in (185 cm)
- Weight: 190 lb (86 kg; 13 st 8 lb)
- Position: Right wing
- Shot: Right
- Played for: New York Rangers; Mighty Ducks of Anaheim
- NHL draft: 1991 NHL Supplemental Draft; New York Rangers
- Playing career: 1991–2000

Steven Andrew King (born July 22, 1969) is an American former professional ice hockey forward who played professionally from 1991 to 2000. He played 67 games in the National Hockey League for the New York Rangers and Mighty Ducks of Anaheim, as well as time in both the minor American Hockey League and International Hockey League.

== Playing career ==
King played collegiate hockey at Brown University for 4 seasons, and during his senior year (1990–1991) he was selected by the New York Rangers in the 1991 NHL Supplemental Draft. During his first two professional seasons, King played 119 games for the Binghamton Rangers of the American Hockey League, and he was called up to the National Hockey League by New York for 24 games in the 1992–93 NHL season. The Mighty Ducks of Anaheim entered the league during 1993–94 NHL season and they claimed King from the Rangers in the 1993 NHL Expansion Draft. King played 43 more NHL games from 1993 to 1995 and then finished his career playing for the Baltimore Bandits, Philadelphia Phantoms, Rochester Americans, Providence Bruins, and Springfield Falcons of the AHL and the Michigan K-Wings and Cincinnati Cyclones of the International Hockey League.

During his career, King played in 67 NHL games, scoring 17 goals along with 8 assists. His other professional hockey statistics included 135 goals and 94 assists during 257 AHL games and 32 goals and 20 assists in 80 IHL games. At Brown University, he scored 56 goals and added 33 assists in 104 games.

== Post-playing career ==
After he retired as a player, King returned to Brown University and served as an assistant coach during the 2000–2001 and 2001–2002 collegiate seasons. He then worked as a financial advisor for three years before returning to Brown in 2006 to succeed his former classmate, Ron Dalgliesh, as the Executive Director of the Brown University Sports Foundation.

King now works as the Assistant Vice President of Advancement at Stonehill College and has shown interest in changing the school’s nickname to the Shovelmakers.

King was inducted into the Rhode Island Hockey Hall of Fame in 2023.

== Career statistics ==
=== Regular season and playoffs ===
			Regular season					Playoffs
Season	Team	League	GP	G	A	Pts	PIM	GP	G	A	Pts	PIM
1986–87	Bishop Hendricken High School	HS-RI	—	—	—	—	—	—	—	—	—	—
1987–88	Brown University	ECAC	24	10	5	15	30	—	—	—	—	—
1988–89	Brown University	ECAC	26	8	5	13	73	—	—	—	—	—
1989–90	Brown University	ECAC	27	19	8	27	53	—	—	—	—	—
1990–91	Brown University	ECAC	27	19	15	34	76	—	—	—	—	—
1991–92	Binghamton Rangers	AHL	66	27	15	42	56	10	2	0	2	14
1992–93	New York Rangers	NHL	24	7	5	12	16	—	—	—	—	—
1992–93	Binghamton Rangers	AHL	53	35	33	68	100	14	7	9	16	26
1993–94	Mighty Ducks of Anaheim	NHL	36	8	3	11	44	—	—	—	—	—
1995–96	Mighty Ducks of Anaheim	NHL	7	2	0	2	15	—	—	—	—	—
1995–96	Baltimore Bandits	AHL	68	40	21	61	95	12	7	5	12	20
1996–97	Philadelphia Phantoms	AHL	39	17	10	27	47	—	—	—	—	—
1996–97	Michigan K-Wings	IHL	39	15	11	26	39	4	1	2	3	12
1997–98	Cincinnati Cyclones	IHL	41	17	9	26	22	—	—	—	—	—
1997–98	Rochester Americans	AHL	28	15	15	30	28	4	1	1	2	4
1998–99	Providence Bruins	AHL	3	1	0	1	0	13	7	4	11	12
1999–00	Springfield Falcons	AHL	23	10	6	16	20	—	—	—	—	—
AHL totals			280	145	100	245	346	53	24	19	43	76
NHL totals			67	17	8	25	75	—	—	—	—	—
