= 2015–16 OJHL season =

- League: Ontario Junior Hockey League
- Sport: Hockey
- Number of teams: 22
- Finals champions: Trenton Golden Hawks

OJHL seasons
- ← 2014–15 OJHL 2016–17 OJHL →

The 2015–16 season was the 22nd season for the Ontario Junior Hockey League.

== Team Change ==
The Hamilton Red Wings relocated to Markham, Ontario and were renamed the Markham Royals.

== Standings ==
Note: GP = Games played; W = Wins; L = Losses; OTL = Overtime losses; SL = Shootout losses; GF = Goals for; GA = Goals against; PTS = Points; x = clinched playoff berth; y = clinched division title; z = clinched conference title

=== North East Conference ===
North division	GP	W	L	T	OTL	PTS
y-Markham Royals	54	31	17	3	3	68
x-Aurora Tigers	54	28	17	1	8	65
x-Newmarket Hurricanes	54	23	22	3	6	55
Stouffville Spirit	54	24	24	3	3	54
Pickering Panthers	54	15	32	2	5	37
Lindsay Muskies	54	12	36	0	6	30
East division	GP	W	L	T	OTL	PTS
z-Trenton Golden Hawks	54	44	6	1	3	92
x-Kingston Voyageurs	54	34	14	2	4	74
x-Wellington Dukes	54	32	19	2	1	67
x-Cobourg Cougars	54	27	21	0	6	60
x-Whitby Fury	54	25	23	1	5	56

=== South West Conference ===
South division	GP	W	L	T	OTL	PTS
y-Oakville Blades	54	34	17	2	1	71
x-North York Rangers	54	30	16	2	6	68
x-Toronto Jr. Canadiens	54	30	16	3	5	68
x-St. Michael's Buzzers	54	28	23	1	2	59
Toronto Patriots	54	18	28	1	7	44
Mississauga Chargers	54	10	41	0	3	23
West division	GP	W	L	T	OTL	PTS
z-Georgetown Raiders	54	37	13	3	1	78
x-Burlington Cougars	54	34	17	1	2	71
x-Buffalo Jr. Sabres	54	33	17	1	3	70
x-Orangeville Flyers	54	23	24	2	5	53
Milton Icehawks	54	5	48	0	1	11

== Playoffs ==
Conference quarterfinals	Conference semifinals
1	Trenton	4
8	Newmarket	0
1	Trenton	4
4	Wellington	1
2	Markham	4
7	Whitby	1
North-East conference
3	Kingston	4
6	Cobourg	0
2	Markham	0
3	Kingston	4
4	Wellington	4
5	Aurora	2
Note: Pairings are re-seeded after the first round.
1	Georgetown	4
8	Orangeville	1
1	Georgetown	4
5	North York	1
2	Oakville	4
7	St. Michael's	2
South-West conference
3	Burlington	4
6	Toronto Jr. Canadiens	1
2	Oakville	3
3	Burlington	4
4	Buffalo	1
5	North York	4

Conference finals
1	Trenton	4
3	Kingston	0
1	Georgetown	4
3	Burlington	2

Finals
1	Trenton	4
1	Georgetown	0
