= 1991 NHL supplemental draft =

Player selection draft

General information
- Date(s): June 21, 1991

Overview
- 28 total selections in 2 rounds
- First selection: (Canada) Jeff McLean (San Jose Sharks)

The 1991 NHL supplemental draft was the sixth NHL supplemental draft. It was held on June 21, 1991.

== Selections by round ==
=== Round one ===
The first round was limited to the expansion San Jose Sharks and teams that missed the 1991 Stanley Cup playoffs.

Pick #	Player	Nationality	NHL team	College (league)
1	Jeff McLean (C)	Canada	San Jose Sharks	University of North Dakota (WCHA)
2	Dave Trombley (C)	Canada	Quebec Nordiques	Clarkson University (ECAC)
3	Patrick McGarry (G)	Canada	Toronto Maple Leafs	Dalhousie University (CIAU)
4	Jim Bonner (D)	United States	New York Islanders	Michigan Technological University (WCHA)
5	Brad Mullahy (G)	United States	Winnipeg Jets	Providence College (Hockey East)
6	Angelo Libertucci (G)	Canada	Philadelphia Flyers	Bowling Green State University (CCHA)

=== Round two ===
Pick #	Player	Nationality	NHL team	College (league)
7	Mark Beaufait (C)	United States	San Jose Sharks	Northern Michigan University (WCHA)
8	Chris Hynnes (D)	Canada	Quebec Nordiques	Colorado College (WCHA)
9	Joe McCarthy (LW)	United States	Toronto Maple Leafs	University of Vermont (ECAC)
10	Jack Duffy (D)	United States	New York Islanders	Yale University (ECAC)
11	Jeff Jestadt (LW)	United States	Winnipeg Jets	Ferris State University (CCHA)
12	Brendan Locke (RW)	United States	Philadelphia Flyers	Merrimack College (Hockey East)
13	Scott Meehan (D)	United States	Vancouver Canucks	University of Massachusetts Lowell (Hockey East)
14	Dan O'Shea (RW)	United States	Minnesota North Stars	St. Cloud State University (WCHA)
15	Shaun Gravistin (G)	Canada	Hartford Whalers	University of Alaska Anchorage (NCAA)
16	Kelly Sorensen (RW)	Canada	Detroit Red Wings	Ferris State University (CCHA)
17	Rob Kruhlak (G)	Canada	New Jersey Devils	Northern Michigan University (WCHA)
18	Tom Holdeman (RW)	United States	Edmonton Oilers	Miami University (CCHA)
19	Jamie Steer (RW)	Canada	Buffalo Sabres	Michigan Technological University (WCHA)
20	Mike Brewer (C)	Canada	Washington Capitals	Brown University (ECAC)
21	Steven King (RW)	United States	New York Rangers	Brown University (ECAC)
22	Greg Carvel (C)	United States	Pittsburgh Penguins	St. Lawrence University (ECAC)
23	Jeff Torrey (RW)	United States	Montreal Canadiens	Clarkson University (ECAC)
24	Peter Allen (D)	Canada	Boston Bruins	Yale University (ECAC)
25	Dean Larson (C)	Canada	Calgary Flames	University of Alaska Anchorage (NCAA)
26	Brendan Creagh (D)	United States	Los Angeles Kings	University of Vermont (ECAC)
27	Chris McGee (F)	United States	St. Louis Blues	Babson College (ECAC East)
28	Dan Gravelle (LW)	Canada	Chicago Blackhawks	Merrimack College (Hockey East)

== See also ==
- 1991 NHL entry draft
- 1991 NHL dispersal and expansion drafts
- 1991–92 NHL season
- List of NHL players
