= Ryan Watson (ice hockey) =

Canadian-born Italian ice hockey player (born 1981)

- Born: June 12, 1981 (age 44) Lethbridge, Alberta, Canada
- Height: 6 ft 3 in (191 cm)
- Weight: 200 lb (91 kg; 14 st 4 lb)
- Position: Forward
- Shot: Left
- Played for: Oklahoma City Blazers; Victoria Salmon Kings; Memphis RiverKings; Manchester Phoenix; SG Cortina; Ritten/Renon; HC Pustertal Wölfe
- National team: Italy
- NHL draft: Undrafted
- Playing career: 2002–2012

Ryan Watson (born June 12, 1981) is a Canadian-born Italian former professional ice hockey player. He played the prime of his career in Italy's Serie A.

== Playing career ==
Watson began his career in 1998 playing for his local team, the Lethbridge Hurricanes at junior level in the WHL. Watson did not start particularly well though, and managed just one point in 22 games in his first season.

For the 2000–01 season, Watson played at the lower junior level of the AJHL for the Drayton Valley Thunder. His performances were much improved, and a ratio of over a point per game was established during a season in which Watson played almost 60 times totalling over 100 points.

Watson began his professional career with the Oklahoma City Blazers of the CHL. He settled well and established himself as an important first team player, turning out in 118 games in the two seasons, and totalling 74 points in that time. His performances brought him to the attention of the Victoria Salmon Kings. The Salmon Kings signed Watson for the 2004–05 season. Watson managed 33 games and 29 points.

Despite his positive points return, he did not re-sign with the Salmon Kings and so returned to the CHL with the then named Memphis Riverkings. Watson again proved his quality, totalling 59 points in 64 games. In the summer of 2006, Watson moved to Europe and was signed by the Manchester Phoenix of the EIHL, the highest tier of club hockey in Britain. However, Watson played in only 10 games for the Phoenix before returning to North America.

On his return he re-signed for one of his old teams, the Oklahoma City Blazers. Watson continued to score points regularly for the Blazers throughout both the regular and post-season periods, managing a point per game ratio. This productivity meant that the Blazers re-signed Watson for the 2007–08 season. It was again a positive season for Watson, who scored 55 points in 63 games.

He returned to Europe and Italy to sign for Cortina SG of the Serie A. Despite the language barrier, Watson settled well and began once again to clock up regular goals and assists. Watson began to play for the Italian nation team and became a pivotal player in there success to winning a world championship. After four seasons in Italy, Watson announced his retirement from professional hockey at the conclusion of the 2011–12 season, finishing his career with three world championships, multiple team championships and individual awards. After retirement Watson was inducted into the Lethbridge Sports Hall of Fame in 2013.

== Career statistics ==
			Regular season					Playoffs
Season	Team	League	GP	G	A	Pts	PIM	GP	G	A	Pts	PIM
1998–99	Lethbridge Hurricanes	WHL	22	1	0	1	2	—	—	—	—	—
1999–00	Lethbridge Hurricanes	WHL	20	3	1	4	2	—	—	—	—	—
1999–00	Drayton Valley Thunder	AJHL	23	7	7	14	51	—	—	—	—	—
2000–01	Drayton Valley Thunder	AJHL	57	43	57	100	85	—	—	—	—	—
2001–02	South Surrey Eagles	BCHL	52	39	50	89	56	—	—	—	—	—
2002–03	Oklahoma City Blazers	CHL	54	15	15	30	42	5	1	2	3	2
2003–04	Oklahoma City Blazers	CHL	64	23	21	44	57	—	—	—	—	—
2004–05	Victoria Salmon Kings	ECHL	33	12	7	19	34	—	—	—	—	—
2005–06	Memphis RiverKings	CHL	64	25	34	59	48	—	—	—	—	—
2006–07	Manchester Phoenix	EIHL	9	2	3	5	8	—	—	—	—	—
2006–07	Oklahoma City Blazers	CHL	55	16	33	49	81	14	6	8	14	12
2007–08	Oklahoma City Blazers	CHL	63	25	30	55	46	—	—	—	—	—
2008–09	SG Cortina	Italy	45	17	36	53	22	—	—	—	—	—
2009–10	SG Cortina	Italy	37	16	18	34	12	—	—	—	—	—
2010–11	Ritten Sport	Italy	38	19	21	40	34	5	4	1	5	6
2011–12	HC Pustertal Wölfe	Italy	18	8	8	16	18	11	3	7	10	6
CHL totals			300	104	133	237	274	19	7	10	17	14
Italy totals			138	60	83	143	86	16	7	8	15	12
