= 2013 Western Canada Cup =

The 2013 Western Canada Cup was played April 26–May 5, 2013 at Nanaimo, British Columbia. This was the first season for the Western Canada Cup, which succeeded the Anavet and Doyle Cups to decide the two western Canada entries in the Royal Bank Cup, Canada's Junior A ice hockey championship.

The Surrey Eagles (British Columbia) and Brooks Bandits (Alberta) finished first and second, respectively, and thereby qualified for the 2013 Royal Bank Cup. The other teams competing were the Yorkton Terriers (Saskatchewan), Steinbach Pistons (Manitoba), and the host Nanaimo Clippers.

== Round robin ==
WCC Round Robin
Rank	Team	League	W-L-OTL	GF	GA
1	Brooks Bandits	AJHL	3-1-0	11	10
2	Surrey Eagles	BCHL	3-1-0	14	8
3	Yorkton Terriers	SJHL	2-1-1	9	10
4	Nanaimo Clippers	Host	2-2-0	14	11
5	Steinbach Pistons	MJHL	0-4-0	6	15

Tie Breaker: Head-to-Head, then 3-way +/-.

=== Results ===
Round Robin results
Game	Away Team	Score	Home Team	Score	Notes
1	Brooks Bandits	4	Surrey Eagles	2	Final
2	Yorkton Terriers	4	Nanaimo Clippers	3	Final
3	Steinbach Pistons	2	Yorkton Terriers	3	Final
4	Nanaimo Clippers	7	Brooks Bandits	2	Final
5	Surrey Eagles	5	Steinbach Pistons	3	Final
6	Brooks Bandits	2	Yorkton Terriers	1	OT Final
7	Surrey Eagles	4	Nanaimo Clippers	0	Final
8	Steinbach Pistons	0	Brooks Bandits	3	Final
9	Yorkton Terriers	1	Surrey Eagles	3	Final
10	Nanaimo Clippers	4	Steinbach Pistons	1	Final

== Semi and Finals ==
Championship Round
Game	Away Team	Score	Home Team	Score	Notes
Semi-final	Nanaimo Clippers	3	Yorkton Terriers	5	Final
Final	Surrey Eagles	4	Brooks Bandits	1	Final
Runner-Up	Brooks Bandits	1	Yorkton Terriers	0	Final

== See also ==
- Western Canada Cup
- 2013 Royal Bank Cup
