= Barry Wilcox (ice hockey) =

Canadian ice hockey player (b. 1948)

- Born: April 23, 1948 (age 77) New Westminster, British Columbia, Canada
- Height: 6 ft 1 in (185 cm)
- Weight: 190 lb (86 kg; 13 st 8 lb)
- Position: Right wing
- Shot: Left
- Played for: Vancouver Canucks
- NHL draft: Undrafted
- Playing career: 1972–1975

Barry Fredrick Wilcox (born April 23, 1948, in New Westminster, British Columbia) is a Canadian former professional ice hockey player who played in the National Hockey League for the Vancouver Canucks between 1972 and 1975. He also played several years in the minor leagues before retiring in 1975.

== Playing career ==
Wilcox spent parts of two seasons with the Vancouver Canucks in the 1970s.

He played for the hometown Royals of the British Columbia Hockey League in 1967–69 before spending three years at the University of British Columbia, where he played for the UBC Thunderbirds. Following his tenure with the Thunderbirds, Vancouver signed Wilcox as a free agent. Wilcox scored 17 goals as a rookie in 1971–72 with the Rochester Americans of the minor pro American Hockey League. The following season, he played 31 NHL games for the Canucks as an injury replacement before he was sent down to the Canucks' farm team Seattle Totems in the Western Hockey League (WHL). Wilcox spent most of the next three years in the WHL and Central Hockey League before retiring in 1976.

== Career statistics ==
=== Regular season and playoffs ===
			Regular season					Playoffs
Season	Team	League	GP	G	A	Pts	PIM	GP	G	A	Pts	PIM
1967–68	New Westminster Royals	BCJHL	28	25	25	50	—	—	—	—	—	—
1968–69	New Westminster Royals	BCJHL	—	—	—	—	—	—	—	—	—	—
1969–70	UBC Thunderbirds	CIAU	—	15	18	33	28	—	—	—	—	—
1970–71	UBC Thunderbirds	CIAU	—	15	24	39	42	—	—	—	—	—
1971–72	Rochester Americans	AHL	73	17	10	27	95	—	—	—	—	—
1972–73	Vancouver Canucks	NHL	31	3	2	5	15	—	—	—	—	—
1972–73	Seattle Totems	WHL	47	19	22	41	38	—	—	—	—	—
1973–74	Seattle Totems	WHL	6	0	1	1	10	—	—	—	—	—
1974–75	Seattle Totems	CHL	55	12	17	29	68	—	—	—	—	—
1974–75	Vancouver Canucks	NHL	2	0	0	0	0	—	—	—	—	—
1975–76	Tulsa Oilers	CHL	44	8	8	16	36	—	—	—	—	—
NHL totals			33	3	2	5	15	—	—	—	—	—
