= 2015 Western Canada Cup =

The 2015 Western Canada Cup was the Western Canadian Junior A ice hockey championship played at the Casman Centre in Fort McMurray, Alberta from April 25 to May 3, 2015. It determined the two Western seeds for the 2015 Royal Bank Cup, the Canadian Junior A National Championship. The Penticton Vees and Portage Terriers finished first and second, respectively. As the Terriers already secured a berth in the Royal Bank Cup as the host team, the second runner-up Melfort Mustangs were awarded the second Western seed.

== Round robin ==
x = Clinched championship round berth

WCC Round Robin
Rank	Team	League	W-L	GF	GA	Pts.
1	x - Penticton Vees	BCHL	3-1	22	7	6
2	x - Portage Terriers	MJHL	3-1	14	10	6
3	x - Fort McMurray Oil Barons	Host	3-1	11	13	6
4	x - Melfort Mustangs	SJHL	1-3	10	15	2
5	Spruce Grove Saints	AJHL	0-4	12	24	0

Tie Breaker: Head-to-Head, then 3-way +/-.

=== Results ===
Round Robin results
Game	Away Team	Score	Home Team	Score	Notes
1	Penticton	11	Spruce Grove	3	Final
2	Portage	1	Fort McMurray	3	Final
3	Melfort	3	Portage	6	Final
4	Fort McMurray	0	Penticton	6	Final
5	Spruce Grove	3	Melfort	4	Final - OT
6	Penticton	2	Portage	3	Final
7	Spruce Grove	4	Fort McMurray	5	Final
8	Melfort	1	Penticton	3	Final
9	Portage	4	Spruce Grove	2	Final
10	Fort McMurray	3	Melfort	2	Final - OT

Schedule and results can be found on the official website.

=== Semi and Finals ===
Championship Round
Game	Away Team	Score	Home Team	Score	Notes
Semi-final	Melfort	4	Fort McMurray	2	Final
Final	Portage	3	Penticton	4	Final - OT
Runner-Up	Melfort	2	Portage	4	Final

== See also ==
- 2015 Royal Bank Cup
- Western Canada Cup
