= 2017 Royal Bank Cup =

National Junior A Championship

Tournament details
- Venue: Cobourg Community Centre in Cobourg, Ontario
- Dates: May 13 – 21, 2017
- Teams: 5 (4 regional champions + host)
- Host team: Cobourg Cougars

Final positions
- Champions: Cobourg Cougars
- Runners-up: Brooks Bandits

Tournament statistics
- Games played: 13
- Scoring leader(s): Spencer Roberts, Cobourg

Awards
- MVP: Cale Makar, Brooks

The 2017 Royal Bank Cup was the 47th Canadian junior A Ice Hockey National Championship for the Canadian Junior Hockey League and the 47th consecutive year a national championship was awarded to this skill level since the breakaway of Major Junior hockey in 1970. The tournament was played at the Cobourg Community Centre in Cobourg, Ontario.

== Teams ==
- Cobourg Cougars (Host)

Regular Season: 39-11-0-4 (3rd OJHL North East Conference)
Playoffs: Defeated Kingston (4-0), Defeated Wellington (4-1), Defeated by Trenton (0-4).

- Brooks Bandits (Western #1)

Regular Season: 51-5-4 (1st AJHL Viterra South)
Playoffs: Defeated Olds (4-0), Defeated Okotoks (4-1), Defeated Whitecourt (4-0) to win league.
Western Canada Cup Champions: Round Robin Games - Defeated Chilliwack Chiefs (5-2), Shootout win Penticton Vees (4-3),
Defeated Battlefords North Stars (4-1), Defeated Portage Terriers (5-0).
Championship Game Defeated Chilliwack Chiefs (6-1).

- Penticton Vees (Western #2)

Regular Season 41-13-4 (1st BCHL Interior Division)
Playoffs: Defeated Merritt Centennials (4-3) Defeated Vernon Vipers (4-3), Defeated Chilliwack Chiefs (4-3)
Western Canada Cup: Defeated Battlefords North Stars (2-1), Shootout loss Brooks Bandits (3-4), Defeated by Chilliwack Chiefs (4-2), Defeated Portage Terriers (5-3). Semi-final Game: Defeated Battlefords North Stars (4-0). Runner-Up Game Defeated Chilliwack Chiefs (3-2).

- Trenton Golden Hawks (Central)

Regular Season: 42-9-2-1 (1st OJHL North East Conference)
Playoffs: Defeated Newmarket Hurricanes (4-0), Defeated Stouffville Spirit (4-0), Defeated Cobourg Cougars (4-0), Defeated by Georgetown Raiders (3-4).
Dudley Hewitt Cup hosts.
Dudley Hewitt Cup: Round Robin Games - Defeated Powassan Voodoos (5-1), Shootout loss Georgetown Raiders (0-1)
Defeated Dryden Ice Dogs (10-4). Championship Game! Defeated Georgetown Raiders (2-1)

- Terrebonne Cobras (Eastern)

Regular Season: 44-5-0 (1st LHJQ Alexandre Burrows Division)
Playoffs: Defeated Princeville (4-0), Defeated St-Leonard (4-1), Defeated Longueuil (4-1) to win the league. (Eastern)
Fred Page Cup: Defeated Truro Bearcats (8-2), Defeated Carleton Place Canadians (8-7), Defeated Collège Français de Longueuil (3-2). Championship Game Defeated Carleton Place Canadians (5-2).

== Tournament ==
=== Round Robin ===
Royal Bank Cup Round Robin
Rank	Team	League	Ticket	W–OTW-OTL-L	GF	GA	Pts
1	Cobourg Cougars	OJHL	Host	2-1-1-0	16	8	9
2	Brooks Bandits	AJHL	Western 1	2-1-0-1	18	9	8
3	Terrebonne Cobras	LHJQ	Eastern	2-0-0-2	10	15	6
4	Penticton Vees	BCHL	Western 2	1-1-1-1	9	7	6
5	Trenton Golden Hawks	OJHL	Central	0-0-1-3	4	18	1

==== Schedule and results ====
All games played at Cobourg Community Centre

Game	Away team	Score	Home team	Score	Notes
May 13, 2017
1	Terrebonne Cobras	3	Brooks Bandits	6	Final - Shots: 39-30 BRO
2	Trenton Golden Hawks	2	Cobourg Cougars	3	OT Final - Shots: 39-27 COB
May 14, 2017
3	Brooks Bandits	2	Penticton Vees	1	OT Final - Shots: 33-21 BRO
4	Trenton Golden Hawks	2	Terrebonne Cobras	3	Final - Shots: 37-27 TGH
May 15, 2017
5	Cobourg Cougars	2	Penticton Vees	3	OT Final - Shots: 33-33
May 16, 2017
6	Brooks Bandits	8	Trenton Golden Hawks	0	Final - Shots: 43-23 BRO
7	Terrebonne Cobras	1	Cobourg Cougars	6	Final - Shots: 35-25 COB
May 17, 2017
8	Penticton Vees	4	Trenton Golden Hawks	0	Final - Shots: 32-21 PEN
May 18, 2017
9	Penticton Vees	1	Terrebonne Cobras	3	Final - Shots: 38-34 PEN
10	Cobourg Cougars	5	Brooks Bandits	2	Final - Shots: 30-27 COB

==== Semifinal results ====
Game	Away team	Score	Home team	Score	Notes
May 20, 2017
SF1	Penticton Vees	1	Cobourg Cougars	3	Final - Shots: 28-28
SF2	Terrebonne Cobras	0	Brooks Bandits	4	Final - Shots: 46-28 BRO

==== Final results ====
Game	Away team	Score	Home team	Score	Notes
May 21, 2017
Final	Cobourg Cougars	3	Brooks Bandits	2	OT Final - Shots: 43-23 BRO

== Awards ==
Roland Mercier Trophy (Tournament MVP): Cale Makar, Brooks
Top Forward: Spencer Roberts, Cobourg
Top Defencemen: Cale Makar, Brooks
Top Goaltender: Stefano Durante, Cobourg
Tubby Schmalz Trophy (Sportsmanship): Nickolas Jones, Penticton
Top Scorer: Spencer Roberts, Cobourg

== Roll of League Champions ==
AJHL: Brooks Bandits
BCHL: Penticton Vees
CCHL: Carleton Place Canadians
MHL: Truro Bearcats
MJHL: Portage Terriers
NOJHL: Powassan Voodoos
OJHL: Georgetown Raiders
QJHL: Terrebonne Cobras
SJHL: Battlefords North Stars
SIJHL: Dryden Ice Dogs
