= Jeff McLean (ice hockey) =

Canadian ice hockey player

- Born: October 6, 1969 (age 56) Vancouver, British Columbia, Canada
- Height: 5 ft 10 in (178 cm)
- Weight: 190 lb (86 kg; 13 st 8 lb)
- Position: Centre
- Shot: Left
- Played for: San Jose Sharks
- NHL draft: 1991 NHL Supplemental Draft; San Jose Sharks
- Playing career: 1992–2000

Jeffrey A. McLean (born October 6, 1969) is a Canadian former professional ice hockey centre who played six games in the National Hockey League (NHL) with the San Jose Sharks during the 1993–94 season. The rest of his career, which lasted from 1992 to 2000, was spent in various minor leagues.

== Early life ==
McLean was born in Vancouver, British Columbia. He played junior in the BCHL, then moved on to the University of North Dakota.

== Career ==
After university, McLean turned pro with the Kansas City Blades in 1992. In 1992–93, McLean made his NHL debut, playing six games with the San Jose Sharks. McLean returned to the minor leagues and did not play in the NHL again. McLean played until the 1999–2000 season.

== Career statistics ==
=== Regular season and playoffs ===
			Regular season					Playoffs
Season	Team	League	GP	G	A	Pts	PIM	GP	G	A	Pts	PIM
1986–87	Langley Eagles	BCJHL	43	17	20	37	8	—	—	—	—	—
1986–87	Richmond Sockeyes	BCJHL	17	9	11	20	0	—	—	—	—	—
1987–88	University of North Dakota	WCHA	37	0	3	3	14	—	—	—	—	—
1988–89	New Westminster Royals	BCJHL	60	70	91	161	128	—	—	—	—	—
1989–90	University of North Dakota	WCHA	45	10	16	26	42	—	—	—	—	—
1990–91	University of North Dakota	WCHA	42	19	26	45	22	—	—	—	—	—
1991–92	University of North Dakota	WCHA	39	27	43	70	40	—	—	—	—	—
1992–93	Kansas City Blades	IHL	60	21	23	44	45	10	3	1	4	2
1993–94	San Jose Sharks	NHL	6	1	0	1	0	—	—	—	—	—
1993–94	Kansas City Blades	IHL	69	27	30	57	44	—	—	—	—	—
1994–95	Kalamazoo Wings	IHL	41	16	18	34	22	4	1	4	5	0
1995–96	Kansas City Blades	IHL	71	17	27	44	34	3	0	3	3	2
1996–97	Kansas City Blades	IHL	39	8	15	23	14	—	—	—	—	—
1996–97	Cincinnati Cyclones	IHL	9	1	3	4	2	—	—	—	—	—
1996–97	Fort Wayne Komets	IHL	6	1	1	2	2	—	—	—	—	—
1997–98	Kassel Huskies	DEL	12	3	5	8	12	—	—	—	—	—
1998–99	South Carolina Stingrays	ECHL	28	8	11	19	17	—	—	—	—	—
1998–99	Tallahassee Tiger Sharks	ECHL	21	16	15	31	12	—	—	—	—	—
1999–00	Tallahassee Tiger Sharks	ECHL	16	3	15	18	2	—	—	—	—	—
1999–00	Quebec Citadelles	AHL	2	0	1	1	0	—	—	—	—	—
IHL totals			295	91	117	208	163	17	4	8	12	4
NHL totals			6	1	0	1	0	—	—	—	—	—

== Post Hockey Life ==
After playing for the South Carolina Stingrays, Jeff and his wife moved to Charleston, SC, where they still reside. Jeff opened his business, SC Health Insurance. He has been a top 10 nominee in Charleston's Choice Awards since 2022 and has received the highest accolades for his outstanding commitment to service excellence. Since 2018, he has been a Health Insurance Marketplace Elite Plus Circle of Champions member. Jeff is also a UnitedHealthcare Premier Producer and an Aetna Front Runner Agent.
