= Western Canada Cup =

Ice hockey championship

- Official logo for 2013 WCC
- Sport: Ice hockey
- League: Canadian Junior Hockey League
- Awarded for: Western Canadian champion
- Country: Canada

History
- First award: 2013
- Final award: 2017

The Western Canada Cup (WCC); was the Junior 'A' ice hockey championship for western Canada from 2013 to 2017. The annual five-team event consisted of the host team and the champions from the four western leagues (Alberta Junior Hockey League, British Columbia Hockey League, Manitoba Junior Hockey League, and Saskatchewan Junior Hockey League), and was used to determine the two Western seeds for the national championship, known at that time as the RBC Cup.

== History ==
Much like the Abbott Cup, the WCC was the championship for all of Western Canada. The Abbott Cup was a playdown championship consisting of a best-of-7 series played between the winners of the Doyle Cup (AJHL and BCHL) and ANAVET Cup (MJHL and SJHL) to determine a single seed into the old national championship, the Centennial Cup. The Abbott Cup winner from 1971 until 1979 played the Eastern Canada Champion, the winner of the Dudley Hewitt Cup. From 1979 until 1989, the Abbott Cup winner played a round robin against the winner of the Dudley Hewitt Cup (Central Canada) and the J. Pius Callaghan Cup (Atlantic Canada). In 1989, the Abbott Cup was divided up and both the Doyle Cup and ANAVET Cup winner were allowed into the Nationals. From 1995 until 2012, the format included the winners of the Doyle Cup, Anavet Cup, Dudley Hewitt Cup, and an Eastern Canada Championship called the Fred Page Cup.

In 2011, the four western leagues proposed to Hockey Canada and the Canadian Junior Hockey League that the Doyle Cup and ANAVET Cup be discontinued in favour of a new tournament named the Western Canada Cup. Hockey Canada announced the tournament's creation in January 2012. Plans for the new tournament were first reported by the Estevan Mercury in October 2011. The trophy presented to the WCC Champion was unveiled in March 2013 and was named in honour of Crescent Point Energy, the title sponsor.

Crescent Point Energy pulled its support of the 2017 WCC despite at least two of the four previous tournaments had turned a profit. In addition, the four participating leagues reported challenges in finding hosts for the event, expressed concern that the tournament format might be preventing the best teams from advancing to the RBC Cup, and that the WCC detracted from longstanding territorial rivalries. Sun Life Financial replaced Crescent Point Energy as the title sponsor for 2017.

Hockey Canada, together with the four leagues, scrapped the WCC format following the 2017 tournament and re-instated the ANAVET and Doyle Cups for the 2017-18 season.

== WCC Champions ==
Western Canadian Champions
Year	Champion	Runner-Up	Series/Host
2013	Surrey Eagles	Brooks Bandits	Nanaimo, British Columbia
2014	Yorkton Terriers	Dauphin Kings	Dauphin, Manitoba
2015	Penticton Vees	Portage Terriers (Note: The second Western seed was awarded to the second runner-up, Melfort Mustangs (SJHL), as the Portage Terriers were the host team for the 2015 RBC Cup.)	Fort McMurray, Alberta
2016	West Kelowna Warriors	Brooks Bandits	Estevan, Saskatchewan
2017	Brooks Bandits	Penticton Vees	Penticton, British Columbia

== See also ==
- Canadian Junior Hockey League
- Abbott Cup
