= Trenton Golden Hawks =

Junior ice hockey team

- City: Trenton, Ontario
- League: Ontario Junior Hockey League
- Conference: East
- Founded: 1996
- Home arena: Duncan Memorial Community Gardens
- Colours: Tan; Black; Cardinal red
- General manager: Connor Armour
- Head coach: Connor Armour
- Website: trentongoldenhawks.ojhl.ca

Franchise history
- 1996–2000: Port Hope Buzzards
- 2000–2001: Port Hope Clippers
- 2001–2009: Port Hope Predators
- 2009–present: Trenton Golden Hawks

The Trenton Golden Hawks are a Junior ice hockey team in the Ontario Junior Hockey League (OJHL) based in Trenton, Ontario. The franchise relocated to Trenton from Port Hope, Ontario in 2009. It had previously been known as the Port Hope Predators and the Port Hope Buzzards of the Metro Junior A Hockey League.

== History ==
Previous to Junior A coming to Port Hope, and subsequently leaving it, the town has operated a series of Junior C teams by the name Port Hope Panthers.

Branding

Port Hope Predators
2001–2009

Trenton Golden Hawks
2009–present

=== Port Hope (1996–2009) ===
In 1996, the Port Hope Buzzards were founded in the Metro Junior A Hockey League. The league only lasted until 1998, when the Metro was absorbed by the larger and healthier Ontario Provincial Junior A Hockey League.

In November 2005, coach Bret Meyers was suspended for one season and the team was fined $4000 after the Ontario Hockey Association investigated the Predators over allegations of hazing and irresponsible public behaviour by the players of the team. In January 2006, the Predators were fined $1000 and their director of operations Tim Clayden was suspended for one month for signing a player to a Junior C card without his knowledge. In June 2007, the Ontario Hockey Association found Clayden guilty of tampering with players from the Cobourg Cougars' roster. He was suspended for one year and the team was fined $5000. In September 2007, Port Hope coach Brian Drumm was suspended for 20 games for striking a Lindsay Muskies player in the face during a game. The team was also fined $3500.

=== Trenton (2009–present) ===
In early 2009, the Trenton Hercs announced that they were folding mid-season and leaving the Ontario Junior Hockey League. In March, rumblings of team moving into the Trenton market came afloat. It turned out to be the Port Hope Predators. According to OJHL commissioner Bob Hooper: "The league never really wanted a team in Port Hope in the first place." In the 2008–09 season, Port Hope was second in league attendance, while Trenton was ninth.

The Trenton Golden Hawks won their first Frank L Buckland Cup Trophy as OJHL playoff champions in 2016, by defeating the Georgetown Raiders in 7 games. From there, the Golden Hawks traveled north to Kirkland Lake to compete for the Dudley Hewitt Cup, where they went 3–0 in round-robin play and defeated the defending champions Soo Thunderbirds in the final. The Golden Hawks went on to compete in the 2016 Royal Bank Cup national championship tournament in Lloydminster where they were eliminated by the Lloydminster Bobcats of the Alberta Junior Hockey League in the semifinal.

== Season-by-season results ==
Season	GP	W	L	T	OTL	GF	GA	P	Results	Playoffs
1996–97	50	13	35	2	-	162	269	28	13th Metro A	
1997–98	50	19	28	3	-	190	226	41	10th Metro A	
1998–99	51	16	27	6	2	193	266	40	11th OPJHL-E	
1999-00	49	11	37	0	1	158	303	23	9th OPJHL-E	
2000–01	49	4	44	1	0	99	338	9	10th OPJHL-E	
2001–02	49	8	40	1	0	119	268	17	10th OPJHL-E	
2002–03	49	10	36	1	2	119	251	23	9th OPJHL-E	
2003–04	49	18	26	2	3	188	197	41	9th OPJHL-E	
2004–05	49	38	5	3	3	226	113	82	1st OPJHL-E	Lost semi-final
2005–06	49	39	6	4	0	300	111	82	2nd OPJHL-E	Lost Conf. Final
2006–07	49	31	11	5	2	209	138	69	3rd OPJHL-E	Lost Conf. SF
2007–08	49	30	13	-	6	198	156	66	3rd OPJHL-E	
2008–09	49	20	26	-	3	189	221	43	6th OJHL-R	
2009–10	56	35	18	-	3	241	190	73	4th OJAHL	Lost semi-final
2010–11	50	19	27	-	4	162	222	42	7th OJHL-E	DNQ
2011–12	49	36	7	-	6	215	128	78	1st OJHL-E	Lost Division SF
2012–13	55	40	10	-	5	228	134	85	1st OJHL-E	Lost Conf. QF
2013–14	53	34	17	-	2	217	152	70	5th OJHL-E	Lost Conf. SF
2014–15	54	41	10	-	1	268	131	85	1st OJHL-E	Lost Conf. Final
2015–16	54	44	6	1	3	193	102	92	1st of 5 East Div; 1st of 11 NE Conf; 1st of 22 OJHL	Won Conf. Quarters 4–0 (Hurricanes); Won Conf. Semifinals 4–1 (Dukes); Won Conf. Finals, 4–0 (Voyageurs); Won OHJL Championship 4–1 (Raiders)); OJHL CHAMPIONS
2016–17	54	42	9	2	1	255	119	87	1st of 5 East Div; 1st of 11 NE Conf; 2nd of 22 OJHL	Won Conf. Quarters 4–2 (Hurricanes); Won Conf. Semifinals, 4–0 (Spirit); Won Conf. Finals, 4–0 (Cougars); Lost League Finals 3–4 (Raiders)
2017–18	54	24	26	2	2	167	192	52	4th of 5 East Div; 8th of 11 NE Conf; 15 of 22 OJHL	Lost Conf. Quarters 2–4 (Tigers)
2018–19	54	33	14	4	3	189	120	73	2nd of 5 East Div; 3rd of 11 SE Conf; 4th of 22 OJHL	Lost Conf. Quarters 2–4 (Whitby)
2019–20	54	40	10	1	3	228	134	84	2nd of 5 East Div; 3rd of 11 SE Conf; 4th of 22 OJHL	Won Conf. Quarters 4–1 (Whitby); Playoffs canceled after round 1 due to COVID-19 pandemic
2020–21	Season cancelled									
2021–22	54	36	16	0	2	219	156	74	2nd of 5 East Div; 4th of 11 SE Conf; 7th of 22 OJHL	Lost Conf. Quarters 1–2 (Haliburton)
2022–23	54	35	15	1	3	233	155	74	4th of 11 SE Conf; 7th of 22 OJHL	Won Conf. Quarters 4–1 (Cougars); Won Conf. Semifinals 4–3 (Jr. Canadiens); Won Conf. Finals 4–1 (Dukes); Lost LEAGUE Finals 1–4 (Blues)
2023–24	56	43	11	1	1	289	134	88	1st of 12 East Conf; 2nd of 24 OJHL	Won Conf. Quarters 4–0 (Spirit); Won Conf. Semifinals 4–0 (Jr. Canadiens); Won Conf. Finals 4–2 (Cougars); Lost League Finals 2–4 (Blues)
2024–25	56	47	6	2	1	265	136	97	1st of 12 East Conf; 1st of 24 OJHL	Won Conf. Quarters 4–1 (Panthers); Won Conf. Semifinals 4–1 (Spirit); Won Conf. Finals 4–1 (Huskies); Won League Finals 4–2 (Menace); Advance to Centennial Cup
2025–26	56	45	9	0	2	288	147	92	1st of 12 East Conf; 2nd of 24 OJHL	Won Conf. Quarters 4–0 (Muskies); Lost Conf. Semifinals 4–2 (Hurricanes)

== Regional championships ==
The Dudley Hewitt Cup (also known as the Dudley Hewitt Memorial Trophy) was awarded annually from 1971–2019 to the championship Junior 'A' ice hockey team for the Central/East region of Canada. That region initially extended east from Ontario to The Maritimes. Later, the field of competition was limited to the championship teams from the Ontario Junior Hockey League (OJHL), Northern Ontario Junior Hockey League (NOJHL) and Superior International Junior Hockey League (SIJHL), and a preselected host team. The tournament format began with a round-robin to determine seeding, followed by a semifinal elimination round played between the second and third seeds, followed by a final best-of-3 elimination round played between the first-place team and the winner of the semifinal. The winners of the Dudley Hewitt Cup went on to compete for the national championship Centennial Cup.

The award's namesakes were George Dudley and W. A. Hewitt, who served as administrators for the Ontario Hockey Association and are inductees of the Hockey Hall of Fame.

Year	Round Robin	Record	Standing	Semifinal	Gold Medal Game
2016	W, Soo Thunderbirds 4–2; W, Kirkland Lake Gold Miners 5–1; W, Fort Frances Lakers 3–0	3–0–0	1st of 4	bye to finals	W, Soo Thunderbirds 4–0; DHC Champions to Royal Bank Cup
2017; HOST	W, Powassan Voodoos 5–1; SOL, Georgetown Raiders 0–1; W, Dryden Ice Dogs 10–4	2–0–1	1st of 4	bye to finals	W, Georgetown Raiders 2–1; DHC Champions to Royal Bank Cup

== National championships ==
Year	Round Robin	Record W-OTW-OTL-L	Standing	Semifinal	Gold Medal Game
2016	W, Brooks Bandits 3–2; W, Carleton Place Canadians 3–1; SOL, West Kelowna Warriors 3–4; W, Lloydminster Bobcats 4–1	3–0–1–0	1st of 5	L, Lloydminster Bobcats 2–6	n/a
2017	OTL, Cobourg Cougars 2–3; L, Terrebonne Cobras 2–3; L, Brooks Bandits 0–8; L, Penticton Vees 0–4	0–0–1–3	5th of 5	did not qualify for playoffs	

Year	Round-robin	Record	Standing	Quarterfinal	Semifinal	Championship
2025	OTW, Northern Manitoba Blizzard (ManJHL), 5–4; OTL Kam River Fighting Walleye (SIJHL), 1–2; W, Greater Sudbury Cubs (NOJHL), 5–2; W, Grande Prairie Storm (AJHL), 6–2	2–1–0–1	1st of 5 Pool A	Earned bye	Lost, 3–4; Melfort Mustangs (SJHL)	Did not qualify
