= 2015 Royal Bank Cup =

National Junior A Championship

Tournament details
- Venue: PCU Centre in Portage la Prairie, Manitoba
- Dates: May 9, 2015 – May 17, 2015
- Teams: 5 (4 regional champions + host)
- Host team: Portage Terriers

Final positions
- Champions: Portage Terriers (2nd title)
- Runners-up: Carleton Place Canadians

Tournament statistics
- Games played: 13
- Scoring leader: Brad Bowles (Portage)

Awards
- MVP: Brad Bowles (Portage)

The 2015 Royal Bank Cup was the 45th Canadian junior A Ice Hockey National Championship for the Canadian Junior Hockey League. It was the 45th consecutive year a national championship was awarded to this skill level since the breakaway of Major Junior hockey in 1970.

The host Portage Terriers defeated Carleton Place Canadians in the final to win their first championship since 1973.

== Teams ==
- Portage Terriers (Host)

Regular Season: 53-3-4 (1st MJHL)
Playoffs: Defeated Waywayseecappo (4-0), Defeated Virden (4-0), Defeated Steinbach (4-0) to win league, Runner-up at Western Canada Cup (4-2).

- Penticton Vees (Western #1)

Regular Season: 44-9-3-2 (1st BCHL)
Playoffs: Defeated West Kelowna (4-1), Defeated Vernon (4-3), 1st Semi-final round robin (3-1), Defeated Nanaimo (4-2) to win league, Won Western Canada Cup (4-1).

- Melfort Mustangs (Western #2)

Regular Season: 39-8-9 (1st SJHL)
Playoffs: Defeated Weyburn (4-1), Defeated Nipawin (4-1), Defeated Notre Dame (4-0) to win league, Second runner-up at Western Canada Cup (2-4).

- Soo Thunderbirds (Central)

Regular Season: 38-7-1-6 (1st NOJHL)
Playoffs: Defeated Blind River (4-0), Defeated Elliot Lake (4-1), Defeated Cochrane (4-1) to win league, Won Dudley Hewitt Cup (4-1).

- Carleton Place Canadians (Eastern)

Regular Season: 49-10-3 (1st CCHL)
Playoffs: Defeated Nepean (4-0), Defeated Cornwall (4-2), Defeated Pembroke (4-1) to win league, Won Fred Page Cup (3-1)

== Tournament ==
=== Round Robin ===
Royal Bank Cup Round Robin
Rank	Team	League	Ticket	W–OTW-OTL-L	GF	GA	Pts
1	Portage Terriers	MJHL	Host	3-0-0-1	13	9	9
2	Penticton Vees	BCHL	Western Canada Cup #1	3-0-0-1	15	8	9
3	Carleton Place Canadians	CCHL	Fred Page Cup	2-0-1-1	13	8	7
4	Melfort Mustangs	SJHL	Western Canada Cup #2	1-1-0-2	11	13	5
5	Soo Thunderbirds	NOJHL	Dudley Hewitt Cup	0-0-0-4	7	21	0

==== Schedule and results ====
All games played in Portage la Prairie, MB.

Game	Away team	Score	Home team	Score	Notes
May 9, 2015
1	Penticton Vees	2	Portage Terriers	3	Final - Shots 33-32 PEN
2	Soo Thunderbirds	0	Carleton Place Canadians	4	Final - Shots 36-27 CPC
May 10, 2015
3	Melfort Mustangs	0	Penticton Vees	4	Final - Shots 30-17 PEN
4	Portage Terriers	0	Carleton Place Canadians	3	Final - Shots 18-13 CPC
May 11, 2015
5	Melfort Mustangs	5	Soo Thunderbirds	3	Final - Shots 32-19 MEL
May 12, 2015
6	Carleton Place Canadians	3	Penticton Vees	4	Final - Shots 29-18 PEN
7	Soo Thunderbirds	2	Portage Terriers	7	Final - Shots 34-17 POR
May 13, 2015
8	Carleton Place Canadians	3	Melfort Mustangs	4	OT Final - Shots 50-27 MEL
May 14, 2015
9	Penticton Vees	5	Soo Thunderbirds	2	Final - Shots 42-22 PEN
10	Portage Terriers	3	Melfort Mustangs	2	Final - Shots 30-28 POR

==== Semifinal results ====
Game	Away team	Score	Home team	Score	Notes
May 16, 2015
SF1	Carleton Place Canadians	2	Penticton Vees	1	2OT Final - Shots 40-37 CPC
SF2	Melfort Mustangs	1	Portage Terriers	6	Final - Shots 30-13 POR

==== Final results ====
Game	Away team	Score	Home team	Score	Notes
May 17, 2015
Final	Carleton Place Canadians	2	Portage Terriers	5	Final - Shots 28-28 TIE

== Awards ==
Roland Mercier Trophy (Tournament MVP): Brad Bowles (Portage)
Top Forward: Brad Bowles (Portage)
Top Defencemen: Dante Fabbro (Penticton)
Top Goaltender: Guillaume Therien (Carleton Place)
Tubby Schmalz Trophy (Sportsmanship): Patrick Newell (Penticton)
Top Scorer: Brad Bowles (Portage)

== Roll of League Champions ==
AJHL: Spruce Grove Saints
BCHL: Penticton Vees
CCHL: Carleton Place Canadians
MHL: Dieppe Commandos
MJHL: Portage Terriers
NOJHL: Soo Thunderbirds
OJHL: Toronto Patriots
QJHL: Longueuil Collège Français
SJHL: Melfort Mustangs
SIJHL: Fort Frances Lakers
