= 2019 Telus Cup =

Major National Hockey tournament in Canada

Tournament details
- Venue: Fort Williams Gardens in Thunder Bay, ON
- Dates: April 22 – 28, 2019
- Teams: 6

Final positions
- Champions: Toronto Young Nationals
- Runners-up: Cantonniers de Magog
- Third place: Tisdale Trojans

Tournament statistics
- Scoring leader: Justin Robidas

Awards
- MVP: Justin Robidas

The 2019 Telus Cup was Canada's 41st annual national midget 'AAA' hockey championship contested April 22 – 28, 2019 at the Fort Williams Gardens in Thunder Bay, ON, Ontario. The Toronto Young Nationals defeated the Cantonniers de Magog in the gold medal game to win their second national championship in five years. This was also Magog's second finals appearance in a row. Thunder Bay previously hosted the event in 1988.

== Teams ==
Result	Team	Region	City
1st place, gold medalist(s)	Toronto Young Nationals	Central	Etobicoke, ON
2nd place, silver medalist(s)	Cantonniers de Magog	Quebec	Magog, QC
3rd place, bronze medalist(s)	Tisdale Trojans	West	Tisdale, SK
4	Calgary Buffaloes	Pacific	Calgary, AB
5	Halifax McDonald's	Atlantic	Halifax, NS
6	Thunder Bay Kings	Host	Thunder Bay, ON

== Round robin ==
Pos	Team	Pld	W	L	D	GF	GA	GD	Pts
1	Cantonniers de Magog	5	5	0	0	19	4	+15	10
2	Toronto Young Nationals	5	3	2	0	12	11	+1	6
3	Calgary Buffaloes	5	3	2	0	21	16	+5	6
4	Tisdale Trojans	5	2	3	0	12	18	−6	4
5	Halifax McDonald's	5	1	3	1	6	12	−6	3
6	Thunder Bay Kings	5	0	4	1	9	18	−9	1

Tiebreaker: Head-to-head record, most wins, highest goal differential.

Schedule and Results
Game	Away team	Score	Home team	Score	Notes	Date
1	Toronto	1	Halifax	2	Final	April 22
2	Magog	6	Tisdale	0	Final	April 22
3	Thunder Bay	4	Calgary	7	Final	April 22
4	Magog	3	Halifax	1	Final	April 23
5	Calgary	1	Toronto	3	Final	April 23
6	Tisdale	4	Thunder Bay	2	Final	April 23
7	Calgary	2	Magog	3	Final	April 24
8	Halifax	0	Tisdale	2	Final	April 24
9	Thunder Bay Kings	2	Toronto	3	Final	April 24
10	Tisdale	4	Calgary	6	Final	April 25
11	Toronto	1	Magog	4	Final	April 25
12	Halifax	1	Thunder Bay	1	Final	April 25
13	Toronto	4	Tisdale	2	Final	April 26
14	Halifax	2	Calgary	5	Final	April 26
15	Thunder Bay	0	Magog	3	Final	April 26

== Playoffs ==
Results
Game	Away team	Score	Home team	Score	Notes	Date
Semi 1	Calgary	2	Toronto	4	Final	April 27
Semi 2	Tisdale	2	Magog	4	Final	April 27
Bronze	Tisdale	3	Calgary	2	Final	April 28
Gold	Toronto	2	Magog	1	Final OT2	April 28

== Individual awards ==
- Most Valuable Player: Justin Robidas (Magog)
- Top Scorer(s): Justin Robidas (Magog)
- Top Forward: Justin Ross (Calgary)
- Top Defensive Player: Landon Kosior (Tisdale)
- Top Goaltender: Olivier Adam (Magog)
- Most Sportsmanlike Player: Nicholas DeGrazia (Thunder Bay)
- Most Dedicated: Brant King (Halifax)

== Road to the Telus Cup ==
=== Atlantic Region ===
Halifax McDonald's advance by winning regional championship played April 4-7, 2019 at Charlottetown, PEI.

Round Robin
Pos	Qualification	Team	Pld	W	OTW	OTL	L	GF	GA	GD	Pts
1	NBPEIMMHL	Kensington Wild	4	2	2	0	0	23	9	+14	10
2	NSMMHL	Halifax McDonald's	4	2	1	0	1	13	9	+4	8
3	Host	Charlottetown Pride	4	2	0	1	1	15	11	+4	7
4	NBPEIMMHL	Moncton Flyers	4	1	0	1	2	18	14	+4	4
5	NLMMHL	Western Kings	4	0	0	0	4	3	29	−26	0

Championship Game
Away team	Score	Home team	Score
Halifax	4	Kensington	1

=== Québec ===
Cantonniers de Magog advance by winning Quebec Midget AAA Hockey League championship.

Best-of-7 series
Pos	Team	Pld	W	L	GF	GA	GD
1	Cantonniers de Magog	4	4	0	16	10	+6
2	Lions du Lac St-Louis	4	0	4	10	16	−6

=== Central Region ===
Toronto Young Nationals advance by winning the regional championship played April 1–7, 2019 at Clarington, Ontario.

Round Robin
Pos	Qualification	Team	Pld	W	L	D	GF	GA	GD	Pts
1	GNML	North Bay Trappers	5	3	0	2	14	7	+7	8
2	GTHL	Toronto Young Nationals	5	3	0	2	18	11	+7	8
3	Alliance	Elgin-Middlesex Chiefs	5	3	2	0	14	10	+4	6
4	Host	Clarington Toros	5	2	2	1	17	13	+4	5
5	HEO	Pembroke Lumber Kings	5	1	4	0	13	26	−13	2
6	OMHA	Kingston Jr. Frontenacs	5	0	4	1	12	21	−9	1

Playoff Round
Game	Away team	Score	Home team	Score
SF 1	Elgin-Middlesex	3	Toronto	5
SF 2	Clarington	1	North Bay	4
Final	Toronto	4	North Bay	0

=== West Region ===
Tisdale Trojans advanced by winning the regional championship played April 4–7, 2019 at Fort William First Nation near Thunder Bay, Ontario.

Round Robin
Pos	Qualification	Team	Pld	W	L	D	GF	GA	GD	Pts
1	Host	Tisdale Trojans	3	3	0	0	12	2	+10	6
2	HNO	Thunder Bay Kings	3	1	1	1	7	8	−1	3
3	SMAAAHL	Notre Dame Hounds	3	1	1	1	5	6	−1	3
4	MMAAAHL	Brandon Wheat Kings	3	0	3	0	7	15	−8	0

Championship Game
Away team	Score	Home team	Score
Thunder Bay	5	Tisdale	6

Full standings and statistics available at Pointstreak.com.

=== Pacific Region ===
Calgary Buffaloes advance by winning best-of-three series played April 5–6, 2018 in Calgary, Alberta.

Best-of-3 series
Pos	Team	Pld	W	L	GF	GA	GD
1	Calgary Buffaloes	2	2	0	8	4	+4
2	Cariboo Cougars	2	0	2	4	8	−4

== See also ==
- Telus Cup
