= John Paris Jr. =

Canadian ice hockey player and coach

- Hockey Hall of Fame, 2023
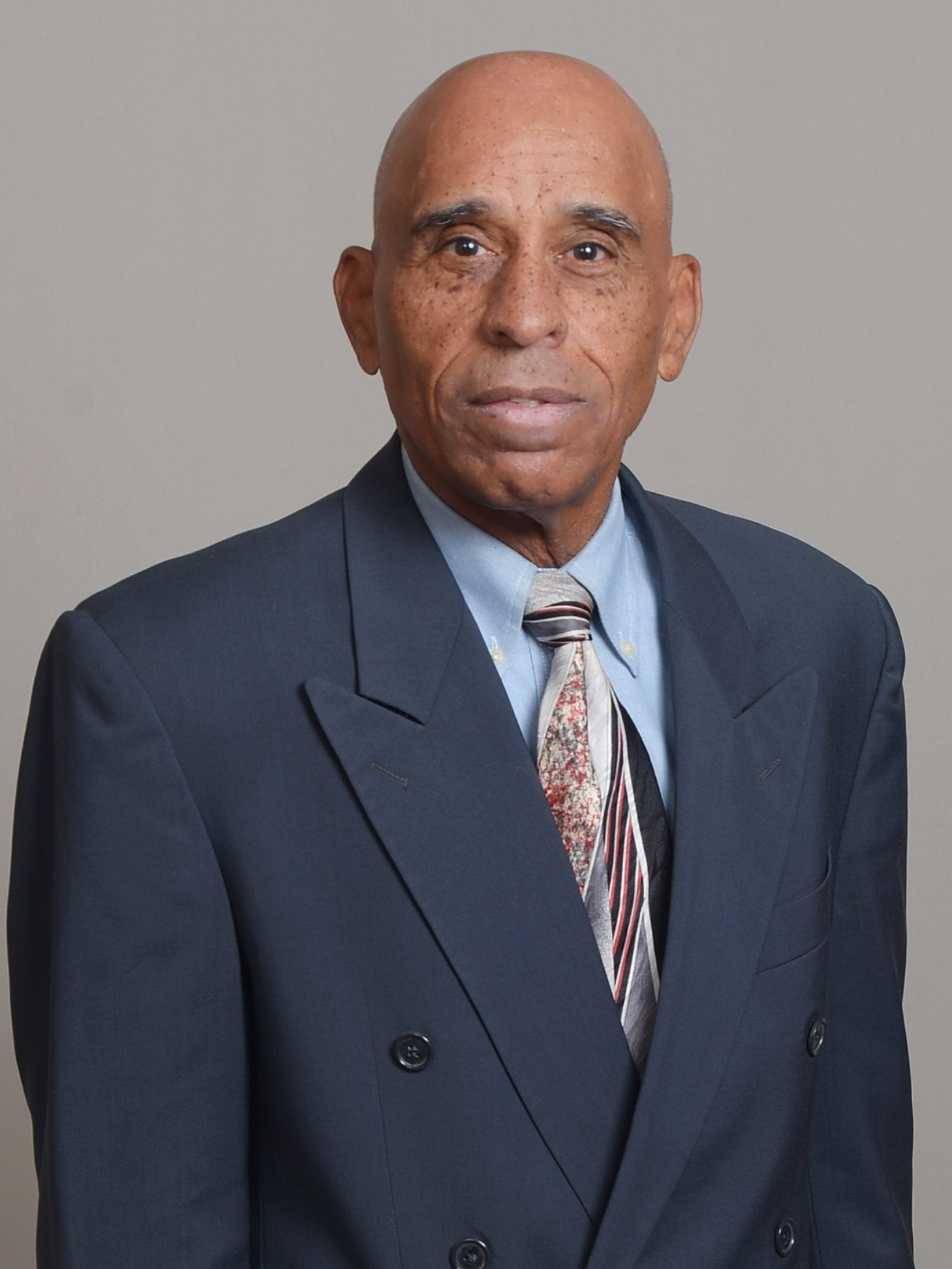
- Born: August 1, 1946 (age 80) Windsor, Nova Scotia, Canada
- Height: 5 ft 5 in (165 cm)

John Paris Jr. (born August 1, 1946) is a Canadian former professional ice hockey player, coach, and scout. He is a Windsor, Nova Scotia, native who stands at 5-foot-5. He played hockey on championship teams at many levels. John is a member of the Nova Scotia Sport Hall of Fame.

== Career ==
=== Hockey player career ===
From 1962–64, John played hockey for the Windsor Royals Midgets junior hockey club. He later received invitation letters to attend the camps of several NHL teams. In May 1963, the Paris family received a visit at home from Montreal Canadiens scout Scotty Bowman, who had taken a 17-hour train ride to meet Paris. Paris then tried out for the Junior Canadiens and began training at the Montreal Forum.

At 17 years old, suffering from an unknown health condition, and weighing only 135 pounds, Paris didn’t make the team. Instead, he played the following season in the Montreal Metropolitan Junior Hockey League with the Maisonneuve Braves. In the 1966 season, he played with the Junior A Quebec Aces, together with Guy Lafleur and Gilles Gilbert. He earned the nickname "Chocolate Rocket".

John later entered the minor professional leagues in the 1967–68 season when he joined the Knoxville Knights in the Eastern Hockey League (EHL). Due to his health issues, John's playing career ended with only nine games played for the Knights. He has Hodgkin lymphoma and ulcerative colitis.

=== Coaching career ===
During the 1970–71 season, Paris began coaching minor hockey in Sorel, in Midget, and in junior hockey with the Black Hawks (renamed Les Éperviers).

In the 1986–1987 season, Paris led his team, the Riverains du Richelieu, to win the Air Canada Cup, the national midget 'AAA' hockey championship, and was named coach of the year. He was the first Black coach in Midget AAA Major. In 1987, he became the first Black scout in the NHL for the St. Louis Blues of the NHL and the first Black Coach and first Black General Manager in the Quebec Major Junior Hockey League (QMJHL), initially with the Trois-Rivières Draveurs, followed by the Granby Bisons. In the 1993–94 season, Paris was hired by the Atlanta Knights of the International Hockey League (IHL), the farm team of the NHL's Tampa Bay Lightning. His move to Atlanta made him the first Black coach in professional hockey. The Knights won the Turner Cup with him.

In 1996, Paris was named Head Coach and General Manager of the new Macon Whoopee, a new team from the Central Hockey League (CHL). From 2000 to 2003, Paris was the director of the hockey program at IMG Academy and the assistant director of the United States Junior Development Program (USJDP), where he coached for 19 years.

== Personal life ==
He is currently living in Fort Worth, Texas, with his wife and daughter.

In February 2023, Hockey Nova Scotia launched a petition to have Paris considered by the Hockey Hall of Fame Selection Committee as an inductee into the Hockey Hall of Fame as a Builder. It was presented through social media under the slogan "Paris to Toronto".
