= 2014 Telus Cup =

Tournament details
- Venue: Mosaic Place in Moose Jaw, SK
- Dates: April 21 – 27, 2014
- Teams: 6

Final positions
- Champions: Prince Albert Mintos
- Runners-up: Grenadiers de Châteauguay
- Third place: Okanagan Rockets

Tournament statistics
- Scoring leader: Tanner Wishnowski (3G 12A 15P)

Awards
- MVP: Lane Michasiw

The 2014 Telus Cup was Canada's 36th annual national midget 'AAA' hockey championship, played April 21 – 27, 2014 at Mosaic Place in Moose Jaw, Saskatchewan. The Prince Albert Mintos defeated the Grenadiers de Châteauguay in the third overtime period of the gold medal game, which was the longest in Telus Cup history. It was the third national title for the Mintos. The Okanagan Rockets won the bronze medal game, becoming the first British Columbian team to win a medal since 1996.

== Teams ==
Result	Team	Region	City
1st place, gold medalist(s)	Prince Albert Mintos	West	Prince Albert, SK
2nd place, silver medalist(s)	Grenadiers de Châteauguay	Quebec	Châteauguay, QC
3rd place, bronze medalist(s)	Okaganan Rockets	Pacific	Kelowna, BC
4	Toronto Young Nationals	Central	Toronto, ON
5	Halifax McDonald's	Atlantic	Halifax, NS
6	Moose Jaw Generals	Host	Moose Jaw, SK

== Round robin ==
=== Standings ===
Pos	Team	Pld	W	L	D	GF	GA	GD	Pts	Qualification
1	Prince Albert Mintos	5	3	0	2	11	3	+8	8	First overall
2	Toronto Young Nationals	5	3	2	0	13	18	−5	6	Semi-final berth
3	Grenadiers de Châteauguay	5	2	1	2	16	12	+4	6	Semi-final berth
4	Okanagan Rockets	5	1	1	3	22	14	+8	5	Semi-final berth
5	Halifax McDonald's	5	1	3	1	10	19	−9	3	
6	Moose Jaw Generals	5	0	3	2	9	15	−6	2	

=== Schedule ===
Round Robin Schedule
Game	Away team	Score	Home team	Score	Notes	Date
1	Prince Albert	4	Toronto	1	Final	April, 21
2	Châteauguay	3	Okanagan	3	Final	April, 21
3	Halifax	2	Moose Jaw	2	Final	April, 21
4	Prince Albert	1	Châteauguay	1	Final	April, 22
5	Toronto	3	Halifax	0	Final	April, 22
6	Moose Jaw	3	Okanagan	3	Final	April, 22
7	Halifax	3	Châteauguay	7	Final	April, 23
8	Okanagan	1	Prince Albert	1	Final	April, 23
9	Toronto	4	Moose Jaw	2	Final	April, 23
10	Okanagan	4	Halifax	5	Final	April, 24
11	Châteauguay	1	Toronto	3	Final	April, 24
12	Moose Jaw	0	Prince Albert	2	Final	April, 24
13	Okanagan	11	Toronto	2	Final	April, 25
14	Halifax	0	Prince Albert	3	Final	April, 25
15	Châteauguay	4	Moose Jaw	2	Final	April, 25

== Playoffs ==
Semifinals
1	Prince Albert	6
4	Okanagan	3
2	Toronto	1
3	Châteauguay	6

Gold Medal Game
1	Prince Albert	4
3	Châteauguay	3
Bronze Medal Game
2	Toronto	2
4	Okanagan	3

== Individual awards ==
- Most Valuable Player: Lane Michasiw (Prince Albert)
- Top Scorer: Tanner Wishnowski (Okanagan)
- Top Forward: Tanner Wishnowski (Okanagan)
- Top Defenceman: Dawson Davidson (Moose Jaw)
- Top Goaltender: Lane Michasiw and Connor Ingram (Prince Albert)
- Most Sportsmanlike Player: Liam Finlay (Okanagan)
- Esso Scholarship: Oliver Jacobs (Toronto)

== Road to the Telus Cup ==
=== Atlantic Region ===
Tournament held April 3 – 6, 2014 at the Pictou County Wellness Centre in, New Glasgow, Nova Scotia.

Round Robin
Pos	Qualification	Team	Pld	W	L	D	GF	GA	GD	Pts
1	NSMMHL	Halifax McDonald's	5	5	0	0	16	3	+13	10
2	NBPEIMMHL	Saint John Vitos	5	3	2	0	14	11	+3	6
3	Host	Pictou County Weeks	4	2	2	0	9	9	0	4
4	NLMMHL	Central IcePak	4	1	3	0	10	8	+2	2
5	NBPEIMMHL	Kensington Wild	4	0	4	0	8	16	−8	0

Championship Game

Halifax 5 - Saint John 4
Halifax advances to Telus Cup

=== Québec ===
Ligue de Hockey Midget AAA du Quebec championship series

Best-of-7 series
Pos	Team	Pld	W	L	GF	GA	GD
1	Grenadiers de Châteauguay	7	4	3	28	24	+4
2	Phénix du Collège Esther-Blondin	7	3	4	24	28	−4

Châteauguay advances to Telus Cup

=== Central Region ===
Tournament held March 31 – April 6, 2014 at the Markham Centennial Centre in Markham, Ontario.

Round Robin
Pos	Qualification	Team	Pld	W	L	D	GF	GA	GD	Pts
1	OMHA	Ajax-Pickering Raiders	5	5	0	0	22	11	+11	10
2	Host	Markham Waxers	5	4	1	0	26	12	+14	8
3	GTHL	Toronto Nationals	5	3	2	0	18	18	0	6
4	OEMHL	Ottawa Senators	5	2	3	0	17	21	−4	4
5	GNML	Sudbury Nickel Capital Wolves	5	1	4	0	9	16	−7	2
6	Alliance	London Jr. Knights	5	0	5	0	14	28	−14	0

Semi-finals

Ottawa 1 - Ajax-Pickering 0
Toronto 6 - Markham 1

Bronze Medal Game

Ajax-Pickering 6 - Markham 0

Gold Medal Game

Toronto 4 - Ottawa 2
Toronto advances to Telus Cup

=== West Region ===
Tournament held April 3 – 6, 2014 at the Art Hauser Centre in Prince Albert, Saskatchewan.

Round Robin
Pos	Qualification	Team	Pld	W	L	D	GF	GA	GD	Pts
1	SMAAAHL	Notre Dame Argos	3	2	0	1	10	4	+6	5
2	Host	Prince Albert Mintos	3	2	1	0	6	8	−2	4
3	MMAAAHL	Winnipeg Wild	3	1	2	0	13	8	+5	2
4	HNO	Thunder Bay Kings	3	0	2	1	5	14	−9	1

Championship Game

Prince Albert 4 - Notre Dame 3
Prince Albert advances to Telus Cup

=== Pacific Region ===
Best-of-3 playoff series held April 4–6, 2014 played at the Red Deer Arena in Red Deer, Alberta

Best-of-3 series
Pos	Qualification	Team	Pld	W	L	GF	GA	GD
1	BCMML	Okanagan Rockets	3	2	1	7	10	−3
2	AMHL	Red Deer Chiefs	3	1	2	10	7	+3

Okanagan advances to Telus Cup

== See also ==
- Telus Cup
