= 2013 Telus Cup =

Tournament details
- Venue: Essar Centre in Sault Ste. Marie, ON
- Dates: April 22 – 28, 2013
- Teams: 6

Final positions
- Champions: Red Deer Optimist Chiefs
- Runners-up: Ottawa Jr. 67's
- Third place: Laval-Montréal

Tournament statistics
- Scoring leader: Massimo Carozza (6G 5A 11P)

Awards
- MVP: Matthew Hudson

The 2013 Telus Cup was Canada's 35th annual national midget 'AAA' hockey championship, held April 22 – 28, 2013 at the Essar Centre in Sault Ste. Marie, Ontario. The Red Deer Chiefs defeated the Ottawa Junior 67's in the gold medal game to win their second straight national title. The Rousseau Royal de Laval-Montréal won the bronze medal. This was Sault Ste. Marie's second time hosting the national championship – the 2003 Air Canada Cup was played at the old Sault Memorial Gardens.

== Teams ==
Result	Team	Region	City
1st place, gold medalist(s)	Red Deer Chiefs	Pacific	Red Deer, AB
2nd place, silver medalist(s)	Ottawa Junior 67's	Central	Ottawa, ON
3rd place, bronze medalist(s)	Rousseau Royal de Laval-Montréal	Québec	Laval, QC
4	Saskatoon Contacts	West	Saskatoon, SK
5	Sault Ste. Marie North Stars	Host	Sault Ste. Marie, ON
6	Valley Wildcats	Atlantic	Berwick, NS

== Round robin ==
=== Standings ===
Pos	Team	Pld	W	L	D	GF	GA	GD	Pts
1	Rousseau Royal de Laval-Montréal	5	4	1	0	28	11	+17	8
2	Red Deer Chiefs	5	2	1	2	21	11	+10	6
3	Saskatoon Contacts	5	2	1	2	19	17	+2	6
4	Ottawa Junior 67's	5	2	2	1	17	13	+4	5
5	Sault Ste. Marie North Stars	5	2	2	1	14	19	−5	5
6	Valley Wildcats	5	0	5	0	7	34	−27	0

=== Schedule ===
Monday, April 22

- Saskatoon 4 - Ottawa 2
- Red Deer 5 - Laval-Montréal 1
- Sault Ste Marie 6 - Valley 2

Tuesday, April 23

- Laval-Montréal 7 - Saskatoon 0
- Ottawa 4 - Valley 2
- Sault Ste. Marie 4 - Red Deer 3

Wednesday, April 24

- Laval-Montréal 7 - Valley 1
- Red Deer 5 - Saskatoon 5
- Ottawa 6 - Sault Ste. Marie 1

Thursday, April 25

- Red Deer 8 - Valley 1
- Laval-Montréal 4 - Ottawa 3
- Sault Ste. Marie 1 - Saskatoon 1

Friday, April 26

- Red Deer 2 - Ottawa 2
- Saskatoon 9 - Valley 1
- Laval-Montréal 9 - Sault Ste. Marie 2

== Playoffs ==
Semifinals
3	Saskatoon	1
2	Red Deer	5
4	Ottawa	4
1	Laval-Montréal	1

Gold Medal Game
4	Ottawa	0
2	Red Deer	5
Bronze Medal Game
3	Saskatoon	2
1	Laval-Montréal	3

== Individual awards ==
- Most Valuable Player: Matthew Hudson (Ottawa)
- Top Scorer: Massimo Carozza (Laval-Montréal)
- Top Forward: Kolten Olynek (Saskatoon)
- Top Defenceman: Gabe Bast (Red Deer)
- Top Goaltender: Simon Hofley (Ottawa)
- Most Sportsmanlike Player: Massimo Carozza (Laval-Montréal)
- Esso Scholarship: Joshua Bergen (Saskatoon)

== Road to the Telus Cup ==
=== Atlantic Region ===
Tournament held April 4 – 7, 2013 at the Red Ball Internet Centre in Moncton, New Brunswick

Round Robin
Pos	Qualification	Team	Pld	W	L	D	GF	GA	GD	Pts
1	NSMMHL	Valley Wildcats	4	3	1	0	15	10	+5	6
2	NBPEIMMHL	Cornwall Thunder	4	2	1	1	15	10	+5	5
3	Host	Moncton Flyers	4	2	2	0	14	11	+3	4
4	NBPEIMMHL	Saint John Vitos	4	1	2	1	11	14	−3	3
5	NLMMHL	Western Kings	4	1	3	0	9	19	−10	2

Championship Game
Valley 4 - Cornwall 3
Valley Wildcats advance to Telus Cup

=== Quebec ===
Ligue de Hockey Midget AAA du Quebec championship series played March 28 – April 9, 2013

Best-of-7 series
Pos	Team	Pld	W	L	GF	GA	GD
1	Rousseau Royal de Laval-Montréal	4	4	0	21	7	+14
2	Blizzard du Séminiaire Saint-François	4	0	4	7	21	−14

Rousseau Royal de Laval-Montréal advance to Telus Cup

=== Central Region ===
Tournament held March 30 – April 5, 2013 at the Brockville Memorial Centre in Brockville, Ontario

Round Robin
Pos	Qualification	Team	Pld	W	L	D	GF	GA	GD	Pts
1	OMHA	Whitby Wildcats	5	4	1	0	24	11	+13	8
2	OEMHL	Ottawa Jr. 67's	5	3	1	1	17	15	+2	7
3	GTHL	Vaughan Kings	5	3	2	0	19	18	+1	6
4	GNML	Sault Ste. Marie North Stars	5	2	2	1	19	16	+3	5
5	Host	Upper Canada Cyclones	5	1	4	0	12	20	−8	2
6	Alliance	London Jr. Knights	5	1	4	0	12	23	−11	2

Semi-finals
Whitby 4 - Sault Ste. Marie 3 OT
Ottawa 2 - Vaughan 1

Bronze Medal Game
Vaughan 7 - Sault Ste. Marie 3

Gold Medal Game
Ottawa 6 - Whitby 5 OT
Ottawa Jr. 67's advance to Telus Cup

=== West Region ===
Tournament held April 4 – 7, 2013 at the Kenora Recreation Centre in Kenora, Ontario

Round Robin
Pos	Qualification	Team	Pld	W	L	D	GF	GA	GD	Pts
1	SMAAAHL	Saskatoon Contacts	3	2	1	0	10	6	+4	4
2	HNO	Thunder Bay Kings	3	2	1	0	10	8	+2	4
3	MMAAAHL	Winnipeg Wild	3	2	1	0	7	7	0	4
4	Host	Kenora Thistles	3	0	3	0	5	11	−6	0

Championship Game
Saskatoon 3 - Thunder Bay 0
Saskatoon Contacts advance to Telus Cup

=== Pacific Region ===
Best-of-3 playoff series played April 5 – 7, 2013 at the Burnaby Winter Club in Burnaby, British Columbia.

Best-of-3 series
Pos	Qualification	Team	Pld	W	L	GF	GA	GD
1	AMHL	Red Deer Chiefs	3	2	1	10	9	+1
2	BCMML	Vancouver North West Giants	3	1	2	9	10	−1

Red Deer Chiefs advance to Telus Cup

== See also ==
- Telus Cup
