= 2018 Telus Cup =

Tournament details
- Venue: Sudbury Community Arena in Sudbury, ON
- Dates: April 23 – 29, 2018
- Teams: 6

Final positions
- Champions: Notre Dame Hounds
- Runners-up: Cantonniers de Magog
- Third place: Lethbridge Hurricanes

Tournament statistics
- Scoring leader(s): Brad Morrissey; Jeremey Rainville

Awards
- MVP: Ronan Seeley

The 2018 Telus Cup was Canada's 40th annual national midget 'AAA' hockey championship contested April 23 – 29, 2018 at the Sudbury Community Arena in Sudbury, Ontario. The Notre Dame Hounds defeated the Cantonniers de Magog in the gold medal game to win their fifth national championship. Sudbury previously hosted the event in 1998.

== Teams ==
Result	Team	Region	City
1st place, gold medalist(s)	Notre Dame Hounds	West	Wilcox, SK
2nd place, silver medalist(s)	Cantonniers de Magog	Quebec	Magog, QC
3rd place, bronze medalist(s)	Lethbridge Hurricanes	Pacific	Lethbridge, AB
4	Toronto Young Nationals	Central	Toronto, ON
5	Moncton Flyers	Atlantic	Moncton, NB
6	Sudbury Nickel Capital Wolves	Host	Sudbury, ON

== Round robin ==
Pos	Team	Pld	W	L	D	GF	GA	GD	Pts
1	Notre Dame Hounds	5	5	0	0	20	7	+13	10
2	Lethbridge Hurricanes	5	3	1	1	13	9	+4	7
3	Cantonniers de Magog	5	2	2	1	18	16	+2	5
4	Toronto Young Nationals	5	1	2	2	15	16	−1	4
5	Moncton Flyers	5	1	4	0	8	17	−9	2
6	Sudbury Nickel Capital Wolves	5	0	3	2	6	15	−9	2

Tiebreaker: Head-to-head record, most wins, highest goal differential.

Schedule and Results
Game	Away team	Score	Home team	Score	Notes	Date
1	Moncton	1	Magog	4	Final	April 23
2	Toronto	3	Notre Dame	5	Final	April 23
3	Sudbury	1	Lethbridge	2	Final	April 23
4	Toronto	4	Magog	7	Final	April 24
5	Lethbridge	2	Moncton	0	Final	April 24
6	Notre Dame	4	Sudbury	0	Final	April 24
7	Lethbridge	3	Toronto	3	Final	April 25
8	Magog	2	Notre Dame	4	Final	April 25
9	Sudbury	1	Moncton	5	Final	April 25
10	Notre Dame	2	Lethbridge	1	Final	April 26
11	Moncton	1	Toronto	5	Final	April 26
12	Magog	2	Sudbury	2	Final	April 26
13	Moncton	1	Notre Dame	5	Final	April 27
14	Magog	3	Lethbridge	5	Final	April 27
15	Sudbury	2	Toronto	2	Final	April 27

== Playoffs ==
Results
Game	Away team	Score	Home team	Score	Notes	Date
Semi 1	Magog	5	Lethbridge	4	Final (OT)	April 28
Semi 2	Toronto	2	Notre Dame	3	Final	April 28
Bronze	Toronto	0	Lethbridge	4	Final	April 29
Gold	Magog	1	Notre Dame	5	Final	April 29

== Individual awards ==
- Most Valuable Player: Ronan Seeley (Lethbridge)
- Top Scorer(s): Brad Morrissey (Notre Dame), Jeremey Rainville (Magog)
- Top Forward: Zach Stinger (Lethbridge)
- Top Defensive Player: Thomas Lucas (Notre Dame)
- Top Goaltender: Alex Vendette (Sudbury)
- Most Sportsmanlike Player: Brad Morrissey (Notre Dame)
- Most Dedicated: Joel Mongeon (Sudbury)

== Road to the Telus Cup ==
=== Atlantic Region ===
Moncton Flyers advance by winning regional championship played March 29-April 1, 2018 at Lantz, Nova Scotia.

Round Robin
Pos	Qualification	Team	Pld	W	OTW	OTL	L	GF	GA	GD	Pts
1	NSMMHL	Dartmouth Major Midgets	4	3	0	1	0	21	9	+12	10
2	NBPEIMMHL	Moncton Flyers	4	2	1	0	1	15	11	+4	8
3	Host	Cole Harbour Wolfpack	4	2	0	0	2	8	17	−9	6
4	NLMMHL	St. John's Maple Leafs	4	1	0	0	3	11	14	−3	3
5	NBPEIMMHL	Kensington Wild	4	1	0	0	3	13	17	−4	3

Championship Game
Away team	Score	Home team	Score
Moncton	3	Dartmouth	2

=== Québec ===
Cantonniers de Magog advance by winning Quebec Midget AAA Hockey League championship.

Best-of-7 series
Pos	Team	Pld	W	L	GF	GA	GD
1	Cantonniers de Magog	4	4	0	17	8	+9
2	Estacades de Trois-Rivières	4	0	4	8	17	−9

=== Central Region ===
Toronto Young Nationals advance by winning the regional championship played April 1–8, 2018 at Rockland, Ontario.

Round Robin
Pos	Qualification	Team	Pld	W	L	D	GF	GA	GD	Pts
1	Host	Rockland Nationals	5	5	0	0	20	7	+13	10
2	Alliance	Waterloo Wolves	5	4	1	0	16	8	+8	8
3	OMHA	Ajax-Pickering Raiders	5	2	3	0	10	16	−6	4
4	GTHL	Toronto Young Nationals	5	2	3	0	21	18	+3	4
5	GNML	Sudbury Nickel Capital Wolves	5	1	4	0	12	14	−2	2
6	HEO	Hawkesbury Hawks	5	1	4	0	8	24	−16	2

Playoff Round
Game	Away team	Score	Home team	Score
SF 1	Ajax-Pickering	4	Waterloo	3
SF 2	Toronto	4	Rockland	3
Final	Toronto	6	Ajax-Pickering	2

=== West Region ===
Notre Dame Hounds advanced by winning the regional championship played April 5–8, 2018 at Fort William First Nation near Thunder Bay, Ontario.

Round Robin
Pos	Qualification	Team	Pld	W	L	D	GF	GA	GD	Pts
1	SMAAAHL	Notre Dame Hounds	3	3	0	0	22	4	+18	6
2	MMAAAHL	Winnipeg Wild	3	2	1	0	15	6	+9	4
3	Host	Thunder Bay Kings	3	1	2	0	5	11	−6	2
4	HNO	Kenora Thistles	3	0	3	0	1	22	−21	0

Championship Game
Away team	Score	Home team	Score
Winnipeg	2	Notre Dame	5

Full standings and statistics available at Pointstreak.com.

=== Pacific Region ===
Lethbridge Hurriances advance by winning best-of-three series played April 6–7, 2018 at Prospera Centre in Chilliwack, British Columbia.

Best-of-3 series
Pos	Team	Pld	W	L	GF	GA	GD
1	Lethbridge Hurricanes	2	2	0	11	4	+7
2	Fraser Valley Thunderbirds	2	0	2	4	11	−7

== See also ==
- Telus Cup
