= 1983 Air Canada Cup =

Tournament details
- Venue: PEPS in Ste-Foy, QC
- Dates: April 17 – 24, 1983
- Teams: 12

Final positions
- Champions: Regina Pat Canadians
- Runners-up: Gouverneurs de Ste-Foy
- Third place: Andrews Maroons

Tournament statistics
- Scoring leader: Tony Hrkac

Awards
- MVP: Donnie Porter

The 1983 Air Canada Cup was Canada's fifth annual national midget 'AAA' hockey championship, which was played April 17 – 24, 1983 at the Laval University Sports and Physical Education Pavilion (PEPS) in Ste-Foy, Quebec. The Regina Pat Canadians defeated the Gouverneurs de Ste-Foy to win the gold medal. The Andrew Maroons, representing the Thunder Bay District, captured the bronze medal. Tony Hrkac of the Andrews Maroons led the tournament in scoring, while Kirk McLean of the Don Mills Flyers was named the Top Goaltender. Other future National Hockey League players competing in this tournament were Alain Côté, Peter Douris, Brent Fedyk, Wade Flaherty, Ian Herbers, Dale Kushner, Scott Mellanby, and Don Sweeney.

== Teams ==
Result	Team	Branch	City
1st place, gold medalist(s)	Regina Pat Canadians	Saskatchewan	Regina, SK
2nd place, silver medalist(s)	Gouverneurs de Ste-Foy	Quebec	Ste-Foy, QC
3rd place, bronze medalist(s)	Andrews Maroons	Thunder Bay District	Thunder Bay, ON
4	Sherwood Park Chain Gang	Alberta	Sherwood Park, AB
5	Don Mills Flyers	Ontario	Toronto, ON
6	Sherwood-Parkdale	Prince Edward Island	Sherwood, PE
7	Corner Brook	Newfoundland	Corner Brook, NL
8	Halifax McDonald's	Nova Scotia	Halifax, NS
9	Winnipeg Monarchs	Manitoba	Winnipeg, MB
10	Ottawa West Golden Knights	Ottawa District	Ottawa, ON
11	Saint John Pepsi	New Brunswick	Saint John, NB
12	Terrace Totem	British Columbia	Terrace, BC

== Round robin ==
=== DC8 Flight ===
==== Standings ====
Pos	Team	Pld	W	L	D	GF	GA	GD	Pts
1	Gouverneurs de Ste-Foy	5	4	1	0	22	9	+13	8
2	Don Mills Flyers	5	4	1	0	37	15	+22	8
3	Regina Pat Canadians	5	3	2	0	22	17	+5	6
4	Halifax McDonald's	5	2	3	0	12	29	−17	4
5	Winnipeg Monarchs	5	2	3	0	14	21	−7	4
6	Terrace Totem	5	0	5	0	12	28	−16	0

==== Scores ====
- Don Mills 5 - Regina 1
- Ste-Foy 7 - Winnipeg 2
- Halifax 5 - Terrace 3
- Regina 6 - Halifax 1
- Don Mills 6 - Winnipeg 3
- Ste-Foy 1 - Terrace 0
- Winnipeg 4 - Regina 3
- Don Mills 12 - Terrace 4
- Ste-Foy 6 - Halifax 0
- Don Mills 11 - Halifax 2
- Winnipeg 2 - Terrace 1
- Regina 4 - Ste-Foy 3
- Halifax 4 - Winnipeg 3
- Regina 8 - Terrace 4
- Ste-Foy 8 - Don Mills 3

=== DC9 Flight ===
==== Standings ====
Pos	Team	Pld	W	L	D	GF	GA	GD	Pts
1	Andrews Maroons	5	5	0	0	27	11	+16	10
2	Sherwood Park Chain Gang	5	3	2	0	24	14	+10	6
3	Sherwood-Parkdale	5	3	2	0	20	15	+5	6
4	Corner Brook	5	3	2	0	18	22	−4	6
5	Ottawa West Golden Knights	5	1	4	0	18	29	−11	2
6	Saint John Pepsi	5	0	5	0	14	30	−16	0

==== Scores ====
- Ottawa West 6 - Saint John 4
- Corner Brook 4 - Sherwood-Parkdale 1
- Andrews 4 - Sherwood Park 3
- Sherwood Park 9 - Corner Brook 1
- Andrews 6 - Saint John 2
- Sherwood-Parkdale 9 - Ottawa West 3
- Andrews 6 - Corner Brook 2
- Sherwood-Parkdale 6 - Saint John 2
- Sherwood Park 6 - Ottawa West 4
- Sherwood Park 5 - Saint John 1
- Andrews 5 - Sherwood-Parkdale 1
- Corner Brook 4 - Ottawa West 2
- Andrews 6 - Ottawa West 3
- Sherwood-Parkdale 3 - Sherwood Park 1
- Corner Brook 7 - Saint John 4

== Playoffs ==
=== Quarter-finals ===
- Andrews 8 - Corner Brook 5
- Regina 4 - Don Mills 3
- Sherwood Park 8 - Sherwood-Parkdale 1
- Ste-Foy 8 - Halifax 1

=== Semi-finals ===
- Regina 6 - Andrews 2
- Ste-Foy 5 - Sherwood Park 1

=== Bronze-medal game ===
- Andrews 6 - Sherwood Park 1

=== Gold-medal game ===
- Regina 5 - Ste-Foy 4

== Individual awards ==
- Most Valuable Player: Donnie Porter (Andrews)
- Top Scorer: Tony Hrkac (Andrews)
- Top Forward: Tim Iannone (Regina)
- Top Defenceman: Selmar Odelein (Regina)
- Top Goaltender: Kirk McLean (Don Mills)
- Most Sportsmanlike Player: Rejean Boivin (Ste-Foy)

== See also ==
- Telus Cup
