= 1979 Air Canada Cup =

Tournament details
- Venue: Winnipeg Arena in Winnipeg, MB
- Dates: April 16 – 22, 1979
- Teams: 12

Final positions
- Champions: Couillard de Ste-Foy
- Runners-up: St. Michael's College
- Third place: Notre Dame Hounds

Tournament statistics
- Scoring leader: Claude Drouin

Awards
- MVP: Pierre Rioux

The 1979 Air Canada Cup was Canada's inaugural national midget 'AAA' hockey championship. It took place April 16 – 22, 1979 at the Winnipeg Arena in Winnipeg, Manitoba. The Canadian Amateur Hockey Association established the Air Canada Cup for the 1978–79 season as the new official midget championship, replacing the invitational Wrigley National Midget Tournament.

The Couillard de Ste-Foy (Quebec) captured the first national championship, defeating St. Michael's College Buzzers (Ontario) in the gold medal game. The Notre Dame Hounds (Saskatchewan) took the bronze medal.

Future National Hockey League players competing at the inaugural Air Canada Cup were Garry Galley, Paul Gillis, Mike Moller, Randy Moller, Tony Tanti, James Patrick, and future Hall of Fame defenceman Al MacInnis.

== Teams ==
Result	Team	Branch	City
1st place, gold medalist(s)	Couillard de Ste-Foy	Quebec	Ste-Foy, QC
2nd place, silver medalist(s)	St. Michael's College Buzzers	Ontario	Toronto, ON
3rd place, bronze medalist(s)	Notre Dame Hounds	Saskatchewan	Wilcox, SK
4	Ottawa West 79's	Ottawa District	Ottawa, ON
5	North Shore Winter Club	British Columbia	North Vancouver, BC
6	Antigonish Novas	Nova Scotia	Antigonish, NS
7	PEI Eastern	Prince Edward Island	Charlottetown, PE
8	St. James Canadians	Manitoba	Winnipeg, MB
9	Moncton Flyers	New Brunswick	Moncton, NB
10	Red Deer Chiefs	Alberta	Red Deer, AB
11	Corner Brook	Newfoundland	Corner Brook, NL
12	Andrews Maroons	Thunder Bay District	Thunder Bay, ON

== Round robin ==
=== DC8 Flight ===
==== Standings ====
Pos	Team	Pld	W	L	D	GF	GA	GD	Pts
1	St. Michael's College Buzzers	5	4	1	0	24	11	+13	8
2	Notre Dame Hounds	5	4	1	0	25	14	+11	8
3	North Shore Winter Club	5	4	1	0	27	18	+9	8
4	St. James Canadians	5	1	3	1	15	18	−3	3
5	Red Deer Chiefs	5	1	4	0	20	25	−5	2
6	Andrews Maroons	5	0	4	1	10	35	−25	1

==== Scores ====
- St. Michael's College 6 - Red Deer 0
- Notre Dame 11 - Andrews 2
- North Shore 4 - St. James 3
- North Shore 8 - Red Deer 8
- St. Michael's College 5 - Notre Dame 3
- St. James 2 - Andrews 2
- Notre Dame 3 - North Shore 2
- St. Michael's College 5 - Andrews 2
- St. James 5 - Red Deer 3
- North Shore 4 - St. Michael's College 3
- Red Deer 8 - Andrews 2
- Notre Dame 4 - St. James 3
- North Shore 9 - Andrews 2
- Notre Dame 4 - Red Deer 2
- St. Michael's College 5 - St. James 2

=== DC9 Flight ===
==== Standings ====
Pos	Team	Pld	W	L	D	GF	GA	GD	Pts
1	Couillard de Ste-Foy	5	5	0	0	41	5	+36	10
2	Ottawa West 79's	5	3	1	1	19	13	+6	7
3	Antigonish Pirates	5	2	3	0	20	23	−3	4
4	PEI Eastern	5	2	3	0	16	29	−13	4
5	Moncton Flyers	5	1	3	1	16	22	−6	3
6	Corner Brook	5	1	4	0	10	30	−20	2

==== Scores ====
- Ottawa West 5 - Antigonish 4
- Ste-Foy 14 - Corner Brook 1
- Eastern 4 - Moncton 3
- Ottawa West 5 - Corner Brook 1
- Ste-Foy 9 - Eastern 1
- Antigonish 5 - Moncton 4
- Ste-Foy 8 - Moncton 1
- Ottawa West 5 - Eastern 2
- Corner Brook 4 - Antigonish 2
- Ottawa West 3 - Moncton 3
- Ste-Foy 7 - Antigonish 2
- Eastern 5 - Corner Brook 4
- Antigonish 7 - Eastern 3
- Moncton 4 - Corner Brook 1
- Ste-Foy 3 - Ottawa West 1

== Playoffs ==
=== Bronze medal game ===
- Notre Dame 7 - Ottawa West 2

=== Gold medal game ===
- Ste-Foy 9 - St. Michael's College 7

== Individual awards ==
- Most Valuable Player: Pierre Rioux (Ste-Foy)
- Top Scorer: Claude Drouin (Ste-Foy)
- Most Sportsmanlike Player: Paul Houck (North Shore)

== See also ==
- Telus Cup
