= 1981 Air Canada Cup =

Tournament details
- Venue: Halifax Metro Centre in Halifax, NS
- Dates: April 14 – 19, 1981
- Teams: 12

Final positions
- Champions: Lions du Lac St-Louis
- Runners-up: Kitchener Greenshirts
- Third place: Antigonish Novas

Tournament statistics
- Scoring leader: Normand Lacombe

Awards
- MVP: Dale Derkatch

The 1981 Air Canada Cup was Canada's third annual national midget 'AAA' hockey championship, which was played April 14 – 19, 1981 at the Halifax Metro Centre in Halifax, Nova Scotia. The Lions du Lac St-Louis won their first national championship, defeating the Kitchener Greenshirts in the gold medal game. The Antigonish Novas from Nova Scotia won the bronze medal. Future National Hockey League players competing in this tournament were Lyndon Byers, Bobby Dollas, Normand Lacombe, Gary Leeman, Darryl Reaugh, Mike Tomlak and Brad Shaw.

== Teams ==
Result	Team	Branch	City
1st place, gold medalist(s)	Lions du Lac St-Louis	Quebec	Dollard-des-Ormeaux, QC
2nd place, silver medalist(s)	Kitchener Greenshirts	Ontario	Kitchener, ON
3rd place, bronze medalist(s)	Antigonish Novas	Nova Scotia	Antigonish, NS
4	Current River Comets	Thunder Bay District	Thunder Bay, ON
5	Notre Dame Hounds	Saskatchewan	Wilcox, SK
6	Gloucester Rangers	Ottawa District	Gloucester, ON
7	Calgary Northstars	Alberta	Calgary, AB
8	North River Atlantic Insulators	Prince Edward Island	North River, PE
9	M.N.S. Stars	Manitoba	Winnipeg, MB
10	Saint John Pepsi	New Brunswick	Saint John, NB
11	Corner Brook Royals	Newfoundland	Corner Brook, NL
12	Prince George Kings	British Columbia	Prince George, BC

== Round robin ==
=== DC8 Flight ===
==== Standings ====
Pos	Team	Pld	W	L	D	GF	GA	GD	Pts
1	Kitchener Greenshirts	5	4	1	0	24	15	+9	8
2	Lions du Lac St-Louis	5	3	1	1	29	15	+14	7
3	Notre Dame Hounds	5	3	1	1	22	12	+10	7
4	Calgary Northstars	5	2	3	0	19	25	−6	4
5	M.N.S. Stars	5	2	3	0	12	18	−6	4
6	Prince George Kings	5	0	5	0	7	28	−21	0

==== Scores ====
- M.N.S. 4 - Kitchener 2
- Calgary 5 - Prince George 1
- Lac St-Louis 3 - Notre Dame 3
- Notre Dame 4 - M.N.S. 0
- Lac St-Louis 8 - Prince George 2
- Kitchener 6 - Calgary 4
- Lac St-Louis 7 - M.N.S. 1
- Notre Dame 6 - Calgary 4
- Kitchener 5 - Prince George 2
- Lac St-Louis 8 - Calgary 2
- M.N.S. 3 - Prince George 0
- Kitchener 4 - Notre Dame 2
- Calgary 5 - M.N.S. 4
- Notre Dame 7 - Prince George 2
- Kitchener 7 - Lac St-Louis 3

=== DC9 Flight ===
==== Standings ====
Pos	Team	Pld	W	L	D	GF	GA	GD	Pts
1	Antigonish Novas	5	4	1	0	25	11	+14	8
2	Current River Comets	5	3	2	0	15	14	+1	6
3	Gloucester Rangers	5	3	2	0	16	8	+8	6
4	North River Atlantic Insulators	5	1	2	2	13	16	−3	4
5	Saint John Pepsi	5	1	3	1	12	20	−8	3
6	Corner Brook Royals	5	1	3	1	9	21	−12	3

==== Scores ====
- Corner Brook 2 - North River 2
- Current River 2 - Gloucester 0
- Anigonish 7 - Saint John 3
- Current River 5 - Saint John 3
- Gloucester 6 - Corner Brook 1
- Antigonish 4 - North River 1
- Gloucester 4 - Saint John 0
- Current River 4 - North River 2
- Antigonish 8 - Corner Brook 2
- North River 4 - Gloucester 2
- Saint John 2 - Corner Brook 0
- Antigonish 5 - Current River 1
- Saint John 4 - North River 4
- Corner Brook 4 - Current River 3
- Gloucester 4 - Antigonish 1

== Playoffs ==
=== Quarter-finals ===
- Antigonish 5 - Gloucester 3
- Lac St-Louis 8 - Calgary 2
- Current River 7 - North River 6
- Kitchener 5 - Notre Dame 2

=== Semi-finals ===
- Lac St-Louis 3 - Antigonish 2
- Kitchener 6 - Current River 0

=== Bronze-medal game ===
- Antigonish 9 - Current River 3

=== Gold-medal game ===
- Lac St-Louis 7 - Kitchener 2

== Individual awards ==
- Most Valuable Player: Dale Derkatch (Notre Dame)
- Top Scorer: Normand Lacombe (Lac St-Louis)
- Top Forward: Dale Derkatch (Notre Dame)
- Top Defenceman: Calvin Fraser (Antigonish)
- Top Goaltender: James Falle (Gloucester)
- Most Sportsmanlike Player: Mike Vinsky (M.N.S.)

== See also ==
- Telus Cup
