= 1980 Air Canada Cup =

Tournament details
- Venue: Cornwall Civic Complex in Cornwall, ON
- Dates: April 15 – 20, 1980
- Teams: 12

Final positions
- Champions: Notre Dame Hounds
- Runners-up: Gouverneurs de Ste-Foy
- Third place: North Shore WC

Tournament statistics
- Scoring leader: Richard Linteau

Awards
- MVP: Gord Flegel

The 1980 Air Canada Cup was Canada's second annual national midget 'AAA' hockey championship, which was played April 15 – 20, 1980 at the Cornwall Civic Complex in Cornwall, Ontario. The Notre Dame Hounds won their first national championship, defeating the Gouverneurs de Ste-Foy in the gold medal game. The North Shore Winter Club of North Vancouver, British Columbia won the bronze medal.

The two most notable players in this tournament were future Hall of Famers Steve Yzerman of the Nepean Raiders and Ron Francis of the Sault Ste. Marie Legion. Other future National Hockey League players competing were Lyndon Byers, Brian Curran, Dean Evason, Gary Leeman, Gerard Gallant, Ron Hextall, James Patrick, Darren Pang, and Gord Kluzak Michel Petit.

== Teams ==
| Result | Team | Branch | City |
|---|---|---|---|
| 1st place, gold medalist(s) | Notre Dame Hounds | Saskatchewan | Wilcox, SK |
| 2nd place, silver medalist(s) | Gouverneurs de Ste-Foy | Quebec | Ste-Foy, QC |
| 3rd place, bronze medalist(s) | North Shore Winter Club | British Columbia | North Vancouver, BC |
| 4 | Halifax McDonald's | Nova Scotia | Halifax, NS |
| 5 | Nepean Raiders | Ottawa District | Nepean, ON |
| 6 | Sault Ste. Marie Legion | Ontario | Sault Ste. Marie, ON |
| 7 | Calgary Northstars | Alberta | Calgary, AB |
| 8 | Moncton Flyers | New Brunswick | Moncton, NB |
| 9 | Brandon Wheat Kings | Manitoba | Brandon, MB |
| 10 | St. John's Christian Brothers | Newfoundland | St. John's, NL |
| 11 | Sherwood-Parkdale | Prince Edward Island | Sherwood, PE |
| 12 | Fort Frances Boise Cascade | Thunder Bay District | Fort Frances, ON |

== Round robin ==
=== DC8 Flight ===
==== Standings ====
| Pos | Team | Pld | W | L | D | GF | GA | GD | Pts |
|---|---|---|---|---|---|---|---|---|---|
| 1 | Notre Dame Hounds | 5 | 5 | 0 | 0 | 31 | 14 | +17 | 10 |
| 2 | North Shore Winter Club | 5 | 3 | 2 | 0 | 26 | 13 | +13 | 6 |
| 3 | Sault Ste. Marie Legion | 5 | 3 | 2 | 0 | 19 | 15 | +4 | 6 |
| 4 | Calgary Northstars | 5 | 3 | 2 | 0 | 22 | 14 | +8 | 6 |
| 5 | Brandon Wheat Kings | 5 | 1 | 4 | 0 | 13 | 23 | −10 | 2 |
| 6 | Fort Frances Boise Cascade | 5 | 0 | 5 | 0 | 8 | 40 | −32 | 0 |

==== Scores ====
- Notre Dame 9 - Fort Frances 3
- North Shore 9 - Brandon 0
- Sault Ste. Marie 5 - Calgary 2
- North Shore 7 - Fort Frances 1
- Notre Dame 7 - Calgary 2
- Sault Ste. Marie 4 - Brandon 2
- Calgary 3 - Brandon 1
- Sault Ste. Marie 5 - Fort Frances 0
- Notre Dame 6 - North Shore 4
- Calgary 12 - Fort Frances 1
- Notre Dame 4 - Brandon 2
- North Shore 6 - Sault Ste. Marie 2
- Calgary 3 - North Shore 0
- Brandon 7 - Fort Frances 3
- Notre Dame 5 - Sault Ste. Marie 3

=== DC9 Flight ===
==== Standings ====
| Pos | Team | Pld | W | L | D | GF | GA | GD | Pts |
|---|---|---|---|---|---|---|---|---|---|
| 1 | Gouverneurs de Ste-Foy | 5 | 5 | 0 | 0 | 37 | 8 | +29 | 10 |
| 2 | Halifax McDonald's | 5 | 3 | 2 | 0 | 14 | 12 | +2 | 6 |
| 3 | Nepean Rangers | 5 | 3 | 2 | 0 | 29 | 15 | +14 | 6 |
| 4 | Moncton Flyers | 5 | 2 | 3 | 0 | 17 | 20 | −3 | 4 |
| 5 | St. John's Christian Brothers | 5 | 1 | 4 | 0 | 15 | 37 | −22 | 2 |
| 6 | Sherwood-Parkdale | 5 | 1 | 4 | 0 | 17 | 37 | −20 | 2 |

==== Scores ====
- Moncton 6 - Sherwood-Parkdale 3
- Ste-Foy 11 - St. John's 1
- Halifax 3 - Nepean 2
- Halifax 3 - Moncton 1
- Ste-Foy 12 - Sherwood-Parkdale 2
- Nepean 9 - St. John's 2
- Halifax 5 - St. John's 2
- Ste-Foy 5 - Moncton 2
- Nepean 10 - Sherwood-Parkdale 3
- Ste-Foy 4 - Halifax 1
- St. John's 7 - Sherwood-Parkdale 6
- Nepean 6 - Moncton 2
- Moncton 6 - St. John's 3
- Sherwood-Parkdale 3 - Halifax 2
- Ste-Foy 5 - Nepean 2

== Playoffs ==
=== Bronze medal game ===
- North Shore 5 - Halifax 1

=== Gold medal game ===
- Notre Dame 5 - Ste-Foy 1

== Individual awards ==
- Most Valuable Player: Gord Flegel (Notre Dame)
- Top Scorer: Richard Linteau (Ste-Foy)
- Top Forward: Rejean Bignola (Ste-Foy)
- Top Defenceman: James Patrick (Notre Dame)
- Top Goaltender: Robbie Richardson (Halifax)
- Most Sportsmanlike Player: Randy Heath (North Shore)

== See also ==
- Telus Cup
