= 1989 Air Canada Cup =

Tournament details
- Venue: Memorial Stadium in St. John's, NL
- Dates: April 1989
- Teams: 6

Final positions
- Champions: Calgary Buffaloes
- Runners-up: Regina Pat Canadians
- Third place: Wexford Raiders

Awards
- MVP: Steve Smith

The 1989 Air Canada Cup was Canada's 11th annual national midget 'AAA' hockey championship, which was played in April 1989 at Memorial Stadium in St. John's, Newfoundland. In a rematch of the previous year's gold medal game, the Calgary Buffaloes defeated the defending champion Regina Pat Canadians to win the gold medal. The Wexford Raiders from Ontario won the bronze.

== Teams ==
Result	Team	Region	City
1st place, gold medalist(s)	Calgary Buffaloes	Pacific	Calgary, AB
2nd place, silver medalist(s)	Regina Pat Canadians	West	Regina, SK
3rd place, bronze medalist(s)	Wexford Raiders	Central	Scarborough, ON
4	Gouverneurs de Ste-Foy	Quebec	Ste-Foy, QC
5	Antigonish Novas	Atlantic	Antigonish, NS
6	St. John's Capitals	Host	St. John's, NL

== Round robin ==
=== Standings ===
Pos	Team	Pld	W	L	D	GF	GA	GD	Pts
1	Wexford Raiders	5	5	0	0	18	10	+8	10
2	Gouverneurs de Ste-Foy	5	3	2	0	21	9	+12	6
3	Regina Pat Canadiens	5	3	2	0	22	13	+9	6
4	Calgary Buffaloes	5	3	2	0	17	11	+6	6
5	Antigonish Novas	5	1	4	0	8	21	−13	2
6	St. John's Capitals	5	0	5	0	7	29	−22	0

=== Scores ===
- Wexford 7 - St. John's 4
- Ste-Foy 7 - Antigonish 0
- Regina 6 - Calgary 2
- Antigonish 4 - St. John's 0
- Wexford 3 - Ste-Foy 2
- Regina 7 - St. John's 1
- Calgary 3 - Ste. Foy 1
- Wexford 3 - Antigonish 2
- Calgary 6 - St. John's 1
- Ste-Foy 6 - Regina 2
- Wexford 3 - Calgary 2
- Ste-Foy 5 - St. John'[s 1
- Wexford 2 - Regina 1
- Calgary 5 - Antigonish 0

== Playoffs ==
=== Semi-finals ===
- Calgary 5 - Wexford 4
- Regina 3 - Ste-Foy 2

=== Bronze-medal game ===
- Wexford 7 - Ste-Foy 2

=== Gold-medal game ===
- Calgary 4 - Regina 3

== Individual awards ==
- Most Valuable Player: Steve Smith (Wexford)
- Most Sportsmanlike Player: Kelly Harper (Wexford)

== See also ==
- Telus Cup
