= 2010 Telus Cup =

Tournament details
- Venue(s): Lévis Arena in Lévis, QC
- Dates: April 19–25, 2010
- Teams: 6

Final positions
- Champions: Notre Dame Hounds
- Runners-up: Mississauga Reps
- Third place: St. John's Fog Devils

Tournament statistics
- Scoring leader(s): Zach O'Brien (11G 6A 17P)

Awards
- MVP: Slater Koekkoek

The 2010 Telus Cup was Canada's 32nd annual national midget 'AAA' hockey championship, played April 19–25, 2010 at Lévis, Quebec. The Notre Dame Hounds defeated the Mississauga Reps 3–2 in the gold medal game to win their second straight national title and fourth overall.

The tournament featured four future National Hockey League players: Morgan Rielly, Slater Koekkoek, Liam O'Brien and Malcolm Subban. Koekkoek was named the tournament's Top Defenceman and Most Valuable Player.

== Teams ==
| Result | Team | Region | City |
|---|---|---|---|
| 1st place, gold medalist(s) | Notre Dame Hounds | West | Wilcox, SK |
| 2nd place, silver medalist(s) | Mississauga Reps | Central | Mississauga, ON |
| 3rd place, bronze medalist(s) | St. John's Fog Devils | Atlantic | St. John's, NL |
| 4 | Gaulois du Collège Antoine-Girouard | Québec | Saint-Hyacinthe, QC |
| 5 | Red Deer Optimist Rebels | Pacific | Red Deer, AB |
| 6 | Commandeurs de Lévis | Host | Lévis, QC |

== Round robin ==
=== Standings ===
| Pos | Team | Pld | W | L | D | GF | GA | GD | Pts |
|---|---|---|---|---|---|---|---|---|---|
| 1 | Gaulois du Collège Antoine-Girouard | 5 | 3 | 0 | 2 | 23 | 10 | +13 | 8 |
| 2 | Notre Dame Hounds | 5 | 2 | 0 | 3 | 21 | 17 | +4 | 7 |
| 3 | St. John's Fog Devils | 5 | 2 | 1 | 2 | 20 | 14 | +6 | 6 |
| 4 | Mississauga Reps | 5 | 2 | 2 | 1 | 19 | 18 | +1 | 5 |
| 5 | Red Deer Optimist Rebels | 5 | 1 | 4 | 0 | 12 | 24 | −12 | 2 |
| 6 | Commandeurs de Lévis | 5 | 1 | 4 | 0 | 11 | 23 | −12 | 2 |

=== Scores ===
- Notre Dame 5 - Red Deer 3
- Collège Antoine-Girouard 3 - St. John's 3
- Lévis 4 - Mississauga 1
- Mississauga 5 - Red Deer 2
- Notre Dame 2 - Collège Antoine-Girouard 2
- St. John's 6 - Lévis 2
- Collège Antoine-Girouard 6 - Mississauga 4
- Notre Dame 3 - St. John's 3
- Red Deer 4 - Lévis 1
- Collège Antoine-Girouard 6 - Red Deer 1
- Mississauga 4 - St. John's 1
- Notre Dame 6 - Lévis 4
- Notre Dame 5 - Mississauga 5
- St. John's 7 - Red Deer 2
- Collège Antoine-Girouard 6 - Lévis 0

== Playoffs ==
=== Semifinals ===
- Notre Dame 5 - St. John's 3
- Mississauga 4 - Collège Antoine-Girouard 3 (OT)

=== Bronze medal game ===
- St. John's 5 - Collège Antoine-Girouard 4

=== Gold medal game ===
- Notre Dame 3 - Mississauga 2

== Individual awards ==
- Most Valuable Player: Slater Koekkoek (Notre Dame)
- Top Scorer: Zach O'Brien (St. John's)
- Top Forward: Zach O'Brien (St. John's)
- Top Defenceman: Slater Koekkoek (Notre Dame)
- Top Goaltender: Scott Bray (St. John's)
- Most Sportsmanlike Player: Alexandre Lemieux (Collège Antoine-Girouard)

== Road to the Telus Cup ==
=== Atlantic Region ===
Tournament held March 31-April 3, 2010 at Halifax, Nova Scotia

Round Robin
| Pos | Team | Pld | W | L | D | GF | GA | GD | Pts |
|---|---|---|---|---|---|---|---|---|---|
| 1 | St. John's Fog Devils | 4 | 3 | 1 | 0 | 22 | 11 | +11 | 6 |
| 2 | Miramichi Rivermen | 4 | 3 | 1 | 0 | 15 | 10 | +5 | 6 |
| 3 | Halifax Titans (host) | 4 | 3 | 1 | 0 | 17 | 13 | +4 | 6 |
| 4 | Cole Harbour Major Midgets | 4 | 1 | 3 | 0 | 5 | 13 | −8 | 2 |
| 5 | Charlottetown Islanders | 4 | 0 | 4 | 0 | 7 | 19 | −12 | 0 |

Championship Game
St. John's 6 - Miramichi 3
St. John's advances to Telus Cup

=== Quebec ===
Ligue de Hockey Midget AAA du Quebec Championship

Gaulois du Collège Antoine-Girouard vs Lions du Lac St-Louis

Best-of-7 series played March 30-April 6, 2010

- Game 1: Collège Antoine-Girouard 4 - Lac St-Louis 3
- Game 2: Collège Antoine-Girouard 8 - Lac St-Louis 3
- Game 3: Collège Antoine-Girouard 3 - Lac St-Louis 2
- Game 4: Lac St-Louis 4 - Collège Antoine-Girouard 3
- Game 5: Collège Antoine-Girouard 2 - Lac St-Louis 1

Collège Antoine-Girouard wins series and advances to Telus Cup

=== Central Region ===
Tournament held March 29-April 4, 2010 at Vaughan, Ontario

Round Robin
| Pos | Team | Pld | W | L | D | GF | GA | GD | Pts |
|---|---|---|---|---|---|---|---|---|---|
| 1 | Mississauga Reps | 6 | 6 | 0 | 0 | 31 | 17 | +14 | 12 |
| 2 | Oakville Rangers | 6 | 3 | 1 | 2 | 28 | 21 | +7 | 8 |
| 3 | Ottawa Jr. 67's | 6 | 3 | 3 | 0 | 27 | 24 | +3 | 6 |
| 4 | Sault Ste. Marie North Stars | 6 | 2 | 3 | 1 | 21 | 23 | −2 | 5 |
| 5 | Vaughan Kings (host) | 6 | 2 | 3 | 1 | 19 | 22 | −3 | 5 |
| 6 | London Jr. Knights | 6 | 2 | 3 | 1 | 20 | 24 | −4 | 5 |
| 7 | Ottawa Senators | 6 | 0 | 5 | 1 | 16 | 29 | −13 | 1 |

Semi-finals
Ottawa 67's 7 - Oakville 5
Mississauga 2 - Sault Ste. Marie 1

Championship Game
Mississauga 7 - Ottawa 67's 3
Mississauga advances to Telus Cup

=== West Region ===
Tournament held April 1–4, 2010 at Morden, Manitoba

Round Robin
| Pos | Team | Pld | W | L | D | GF | GA | GD | Pts |
|---|---|---|---|---|---|---|---|---|---|
| 1 | Notre Dame Hounds | 3 | 3 | 0 | 0 | 17 | 12 | +5 | 6 |
| 2 | Pembina Valley Hawks (host) | 3 | 1 | 1 | 1 | 12 | 13 | −1 | 3 |
| 3 | Thunder Bay Kings | 3 | 1 | 2 | 0 | 10 | 11 | −1 | 2 |
| 4 | Eastman Selects | 3 | 0 | 2 | 1 | 12 | 15 | −3 | 1 |

Championship Game
Notre Dame 6 - Pembina Valley 3
Notre Dame advances to Telus Cup

=== Pacific Region ===
Red Deer Optimist Rebels vs Vancouver North West Giants

Best-of-3 series played April 2–4, 2010

- Game 1: Vancouver 7 - Red Deer 4
- Game 2: Red Deer 5 - Vancouver 2
- Game 2: Red Deer 2 - Vancouver 1

Red Deer wins series and advances to Telus Cup

== See also ==
- Telus Cup
