= John Brother MacDonald Stadium =

Coordinates: 45.5782°N 62.6444°W

The John Brother MacDonald Stadium (formerly New Glasgow Stadium) was a multi-purpose arena in New Glasgow, Nova Scotia, Canada. With ice in, the capacity including mezzanine was 3,013, while without ice the arena held 3,723. It was home to the Weeks Crushers of the Maritime Junior Hockey League from 2004 to 2012 and was home the Weeks Major Midgets of the Nova Scotia Major Midget Hockey League (NSMMHL), as well as the high school North Nova Education Centre Gryphons of the NSSAF Division I Hockey League. The venue hosted the Air Canada Cup (now Telus Cup), in 1997, and the 2001 World Under 17 Hockey Championships (co-hosted with Truro). In May 2008, it hosted the Fred Page Cup, the Eastern Canadian Junior A Championship tournament.

The facility was renamed John Brother MacDonald Stadium after the long-time local coach and gym teacher at New Glasgow High School died in 2004, prior to which it was known as the New Glasgow Stadium. Demolition of the John Brother MacDonald Stadium began in January 2019.
