= 1997 Air Canada Cup =

Tournament details
- Venue: New Glasgow Stadium in New Glasgow, NS
- Dates: April 22–27, 1997
- Teams: 6

Final positions
- Champions: Thunder Bay Kings
- Runners-up: New Liskeard Cubs
- Third place: Calgary Royals

Tournament statistics
- Scoring leader: Tim Zafiris

Awards
- MVP: Tim Zafiris

The 1997 Air Canada Cup was Canada's 19th annual national midget 'AAA' hockey championship, played April 22–27, 1997 at the New Glasgow Stadium in New Glasgow, Nova Scotia. The Thunder Bay Kings defeated the New Liskeard Cubs in the championship game to win their second gold medal in three years. The Calgary Royals won the bronze medal.

== Teams ==
Result	Team	Region	City
1st place, gold medalist(s)	Thunder Bay Kings	West	Thunder Bay, ON
2nd place, silver medalist(s)	New Liskeard Cubs	Central	New Liskeard, ON
3rd place, bronze medalist(s)	Calgary Royals	Pacific	Calgary, Alberta
4	Riverains de Collège Charles-Lemoyne	Quebec	Sainte-Catherine, QC
5	Charlottetown Abbies	Atlantic	Charlottetown, PE
6	Pictou County Weeks	Host	New Glasgow, NS

== Round robin ==
=== Standings ===
Pos	Team	Pld	W	L	D	GF	GA	GD	Pts
1	Thunder Bay Kings	5	4	1	0	23	13	+10	8
2	Riverains de Collège Charles-Lemoyne	5	3	1	1	28	11	+17	7
3	New Liskeard Cubs	5	3	2	0	23	14	+9	6
4	Calgary Royals	5	2	2	1	18	19	−1	5
5	Charlottetown Abbies	5	1	4	0	12	36	−24	2
6	Pictou County Weeks	5	0	3	2	15	26	−11	2

=== Scores ===
- New Liskeard 5 - Collège Charles-Lemoyne 2
- Calgary 9 - Charlotteown 2
- Thunder Bay 6 - Pictou County 3
- Collège Charles-Lemoyne 13 - Charlottetown 1
- Thunder Bay 6 - New Liskeard 3
- Calgary 4 - Pictou County 4
- New Liskeard 5 - Charlottetown 1
- Collège Charles-Lemoyne 4 - Thunder Bay 1
- Calgary 4 - New Liskeard 2
- Charlottetown 5 - Pictou County 4
- Thunder Bay 4 - Calgary 0
- New Liskeard 8 - Pictou County 1
- Collège Charles-Lemoyne 7 - Calgary 1
- Thunder Bay 6 - Charlottetown 3
- Pictou County 3 - Collège Charles-Lemoyne 3

== Playoffs ==
=== Semi-finals ===
- New Liskeard 4 - Collège Charles-Lemoyne 3
- Thunder Bay 3 - Calgary 2 (OT)

=== Bronze-medal game ===
- Calgary 3 - Collège Charles-Lemoyne 2

=== Gold-medal game ===
- Thunder Bay 4 - New Liskeard 1

== Individual awards ==
- Most Valuable Player: Tim Zafiris (New Liskeard)
- Top Scorer: Tim Zafiris (New Liskeard)
- Top Forward: John Bistihas (Calgary)
- Top Defenceman: Erik Adams (Thunder Bay)
- Top Goaltender: David St. Germain (Collège Charles-Lemoyne)
- Most Sportsmanlike Player: Derek Field (Pictou County)
- Air Canada Scholarship: Tim Zafiris (New Liskeard)
- Esso Scholarship: Vincent Blanchette (Collège Charles-Lemoyne)

== See also ==
- Telus Cup
