= 1992 Air Canada Cup =

Tournament details
- Venue: Dartmouth Sportsplex in Dartmouth, NS
- Dates: April 21 – 26, 1992
- Teams: 6

Final positions
- Champions: Lions du Lac St-Louis
- Runners-up: Thunder Bay Kings
- Third place: Dartmouth Kings

Awards
- MVP: Dustin Kelly

The 1992 Air Canada Cup was Canada's 14th annual national midget 'AAA' hockey championship, which was played April 21 – 26, 1992 at the Dartmouth Sportsplex in Dartmouth, Nova Scotia. The Lions du Lac-St Louis from Quebec defeated the Thunder Bay Kings to win their third gold medal. The host Dartmouth Kings took the bronze medal.

== Teams ==
| Result | Team | Region | City |
|---|---|---|---|
| 1st place, gold medalist(s) | Lions du Lac-St Louis | Quebec | Dollard-des-Ormeaux, QC |
| 2nd place, silver medalist(s) | Thunder Bay Kings | West | Thunder Bay, ON |
| 3rd place, bronze medalist(s) | Dartmouth Kings | Host | Dartmouth, NS |
| 4 | Mississauga Blackhawks | Central | Mississauga, ON |
| 5 | North Kamloops Lions | Pacific | Kamploops, BC |
| 6 | Miramichi Rivermen | Atlantic | Miramichi, NB |

== Round robin ==
=== Standings ===
| Pos | Team | Pld | W | L | D | GF | GA | GD | Pts |
|---|---|---|---|---|---|---|---|---|---|
| 1 | Lions du Lac-St Louis | 5 | 3 | 1 | 1 | 21 | 7 | +14 | 7 |
| 2 | Dartmouth Kings | 5 | 3 | 2 | 0 | 14 | 12 | +2 | 6 |
| 3 | Thunder Bay Kings | 5 | 3 | 2 | 0 | 10 | 13 | −3 | 6 |
| 4 | Mississauga Blackhawks | 5 | 2 | 1 | 2 | 20 | 18 | +2 | 6 |
| 5 | North Kamloops Lions | 5 | 2 | 2 | 1 | 20 | 18 | +2 | 5 |
| 6 | Miramichi Rivermen | 5 | 0 | 5 | 0 | 13 | 30 | −17 | 0 |

=== Scores ===
- Lac St-Louis 4 - Dartmouth 0
- Thunder Bay 3 - Miramichi 2
- North Kamloops 5 - Mississauga 5
- Dartmouth 3 - Thunder Bay 0
- Lac St-Louis 8 - Miramichi 1
- Thunder Bay 3 - North Kamloops 0
- Mississauga 1 - Lac St-Louis 1
- Dartmouth 4 - Miramichi 1
- North Kamloops 5 - Lac St-Louis 2
- Thunder Bay 4 - Mississauga 2
- Dartmouth 4 - North Kamloops 3
- Mississauga 8 - Miramichi 5
- Lac St-Louis 6 - Thunder Bay 0
- Mississauga 4 - Dartmouth 3
- North Kamloops 7 - Miramichi 4

== Playoffs ==
=== Semi-final ===
- (3) Thunder Bay 2 - (2) Dartmouth 1 OT

=== Gold-medal game ===
- (1) Lac St Louis 6 - (3) Thunder Bay 1

== Individual awards ==
- Most Valuable Player: Dustin Kelly (North Kamloops Lions)

== See also ==
- Telus Cup
