= 1999 Air Canada Cup =

Tournament details
- Venue: Prince Albert Comuniplex in Prince Albert, SK
- Dates: April 19–25, 1999
- Teams: 6

Final positions
- Champions: Regina Pat Canadians
- Runners-up: Calgary Flames
- Third place: Gouverneurs de Ste-Foy

Tournament statistics
- Scoring leader: Curtis Markewich

Awards
- MVP: Curtis Markewich

The 1999 Air Canada Cup was Canada's 21st annual national midget 'AAA' hockey championship, played April 19–25, 1999 at the Prince Albert Comuniplex in Prince Albert, Saskatchewan. The Regina Pat Canadians defeated the Calgary AAA Midget Flames in double overtime in the championship game to win the gold medal. The Gouverneurs de Ste-Foy from Quebec took home the bronze medal in their tenth Air Canada Cup appearance.

== Teams ==
Result	Team	Region	City
1st place, gold medalist(s)	Regina Pat Canadians	West	Regina, SK
2nd place, silver medalist(s)	Calgary AAA Midget Flames	Pacific	Calgary, AB
3rd place, bronze medalist(s)	Gouverneurs de Ste-Foy	Quebec	Sainte Foy, QC
4	Prince Albert Mintos	Host	Prince Albert, SK
5	Cape Breton Jeans Experts	Atlantic	Sydney, NS
6	Sault Ste. Marie North Stars	Central	Sault Ste. Marie, ON

== Round robin ==
=== Standings ===
Pos	Team	Pld	W	L	D	GF	GA	GD	Pts
1	Calgary AAA Midget Flames	5	4	1	0	18	11	+7	8
2	Regina Pat Canadians	5	4	1	0	31	9	+22	8
3	Gouverneurs de Ste-Foy	5	4	1	0	26	12	+14	8
4	Prince Albert Mintos	5	2	3	0	14	19	−5	4
5	Cape Breton Jeans Experts	5	1	4	0	10	29	−19	2
6	Sault Ste. Marie North Stars	5	0	5	0	14	33	−19	0

=== Scores ===
- Ste-Foy 7 - Sault Ste. Marie 1
- Calgary 4 - Regina 2
- Prince Albert 2 - Cape Breton 1
- Regina 9 - Sault Ste. Marie 2
- Ste-Foy 9 - Cape Breton 3
- Calgary 2 - Prince Albert 1
- Regina 10 - Cape Breton 0
- Calgary 5 - Sault Ste. Marie 3
- Ste_Foy 5 - Prince Albert 2
- Cape Breton 5 - Sault Ste. Marie 4
- Ste-Foy 4 - Calgary 4
- Regina 7 - Prince Albert 2
- Calgary 4 - Cape Breton 1
- Regina 3 - Ste-Foy 1
- Prince Albert 7 - Sault Ste. Marie 4

== Playoffs ==
=== Semi-finals ===
- Calgary 3 - Prince Albert 1
- Regina 3 - Ste-Foy 2 (2OT)

=== Bronze-medal game ===
- Ste-Foy 6 - Prince Albert 2

=== Gold-medal game ===
- Regina 5 - Calgary 4 (2OT)

== Individual awards ==
- Most Valuable Player: Curtis Markewich (Regina)
- Top Scorer: Curtis Markewich (Regina)
- Top Forward: Jean-Phillippe Briere (Ste-Foy)
- Top Defenceman: Jean-Philippe Côté (Ste-Foy)
- Top Goaltender: Paul Valaitis (Regina)
- Most Sportsmanlike Player: David Borrelli (Sault Ste. Marie)

== Regional Playdowns ==
=== Atlantic Region ===
- The Cape Breton Jeans Experts advanced by winning their regional tournament, which was played April 1–4, 1999 in Dartmouth, Nova Scotia.

=== Quebec ===
- The Gouverneurs de Ste-Foy advanced by capturing the Quebec Midget AAA League title.

=== Central Region ===
- The Sault Ste. Marie North Stars advanced by winning their regional tournament, which was played April 6–11, 1999 in Belleville, Ontario.

=== West Region ===
- The Regina Pat Canadians advanced by winning their regional tournament, which was played April 8–11, 1999 in Saskatoon, Saskatchewan.

=== Pacific Region ===
- The Calgary AAA Midget Flames advanced by winning their regional tournament, which was played April 9–11, 1999 in Calgary, Alberta.

== See also ==
- Telus Cup
