= 1993 Air Canada Cup =

Tournament details
- Venue: Kitchener Memorial Auditorium Complex in Kitchener, ON
- Dates: April 19 – 25, 1993
- Teams: 6

Final positions
- Champions: Yorkton Mallers
- Runners-up: Gouverneurs de Ste-Foy
- Third place: Sault Ste. Marie Legion

Tournament statistics
- Scoring leader: David Reynold

Awards
- MVP: Martin Chouinard

The 1993 Air Canada Cup was Canada's 15th annual national midget 'AAA' hockey championship, which was played April 19 – 25, 1993 at the Kitchener Memorial Auditorium Complex in Kitchener, Ontario. The Yorkton Mallers from Saskatchewan won the gold medal with a 5-4 overtime victory over the Gouverneurs de Ste-Foy. The Sault Ste. Marie Legion took the bronze medal. Marty Turco of Sault Ste. Marie was named the Top Goaltender of the tournament.

== Teams ==
Result	Team	Region	City
1st place, gold medalist(s)	Yorkton Mallers	West	Yorkton, SK
2nd place, silver medalist(s)	Gouverneurs de Ste-Foy	Quebec	Ste-Foy, QC
3rd place, bronze medalist(s)	Sault Ste. Marie Legion	Central	Sault Ste. Marie, ON
4	Calgary Northstars	Pacific	Calgary, AB
5	Fredericton Canadiens	Atlantic	Fredericton, NB
6	Kitchener Greenshirts	Host	Kitchener, ON

== Round robin ==
=== Standings ===
Pos	Team	Pld	W	L	D	GF	GA	GD	Pts
1	Gouverneurs de Ste-Foy	5	3	0	2	17	10	+7	8
2	Sault Ste. Marie Legion	5	4	1	0	20	11	+9	8
3	Yorkton Mallers	5	2	2	1	18	16	+2	5
4	Calgary Northstars	5	2	3	0	19	27	−8	4
5	Fredericton Canadiens	5	1	2	2	22	18	+4	4
6	Kitchener Greenshirts	5	0	4	1	11	25	−14	1

=== Scores ===
- Kitchener 2 - Ste-Foy 2
- Sault Ste. Marie 3 - Yorkton 2
- Calgary 6 - Fredericton 5
- Yorkton 3 - Kitchener 1
- Ste-Foy 3 - Sault Ste. Marie 2
- Calgary 5 - Kitchener 4
- Sault Ste. Marie 3 - Fredericton 2
- Ste-Foy 3 - Yorkton 0
- Fredericton 7 - Kitchener 1
- Sault Ste. Marie 4 - Calgary 1
- Yorkton 8 - Calgary 4
- Ste-Foy 3 - Fredericton 3
- Sault Ste. Marie 8 - Kitchener 3
- Ste-Foy 6 - Calgary 3
- Fredericton 5 - Yorkton 5

== Playoffs ==
=== Semi-final ===
- (2) Yorkton 4 - (3) Sault Ste. Marie 1

=== Gold-medal game ===
- (2) Yorkton 5 - (1) Ste-Foy 4 OT

== Individual awards ==
- Most Valuable Player: Martin Chouinard (Ste-Foy)
- Top Scorer: David Reynolds (Fredericton)
- Top Forward: David Reynolds (Fredericton)
- Top Defenceman: Jim Drolet (Ste-Foy)
- Top Goaltender: Marty Turco (Sault Ste. Marie)
- Most Sportsmanlike Player: Jeremy Rebek (Sault Ste. Marie)

== See also ==
- Telus Cup
