= 2000 Air Canada Cup =

Hockey tournament

Tournament details
- Venue: Maurice Richard Arena in Montréal, QC
- Dates: April 24–30, 2000
- Teams: 6

Final positions
- Champions: Cantonniers de Magog
- Runners-up: Collége Français de Montréal-Bourassa
- Third place: Saskatoon Contacts

Tournament statistics
- Scoring leader: Josh Welter

Awards
- MVP: Jean-François Kingsley

The 2000 Air Canada Cup was Canada's 22nd annual national midget 'AAA' hockey championship, played April 24–30, 2000 at the Maurice Richard Arena in Montreal, Quebec. The championship game was an all-Quebec showdown as the Quebec champions Cantonniers de Magog shutout the host Collége Français de Montréal-Bourassa 6–0 in the gold medal game to win the national championship.

Future National Hockey League players competing in this tournament were Joffrey Lupul and Ryane Clowe.

== Teams ==
Result	Team	Region	City
1st place, gold medalist(s)	Cantonniers de Magog	Quebec	Magog, Quebec
2nd place, silver medalist(s)	Collége Français de Montréal-Bourassa	Host	Montreal, QC
3rd place, bronze medalist(s)	Saskatoon Contacts	West	Saskatoon, SK
4	Fort Saskatchewan Rangers	Pacific	Fort Saskatchewan, AB
5	Richmond Hill Stars	Central	Richmond Hill, ON
6	St. John's Maple Leafs	Atlantic	St. John's, NL

== Round robin ==
=== Standings ===
Pos	Team	Pld	W	L	D	GF	GA	GD	Pts
1	Cantonniers de Magog	5	4	1	0	36	13	+23	8
2	Collége Français de Montréal-Bourassa	5	4	1	0	25	14	+11	8
3	Fort Saskatchewan Rangers	5	4	1	0	25	12	+13	8
4	Saskatoon Contacts	5	1	3	1	19	19	0	3
5	Richmond Hill Stars	5	1	4	0	9	41	−32	2
6	St. John's Maple Leafs	5	0	4	1	13	27	−14	1

=== Scores ===
- Fort Saskatchewan 6 - Saskatoon 4
- Magog 14 - Richmond Hill 3
- Montréal-Bourassa 6 - St. John's 4
- Saskatoon 7 - Richmond Hill 0
- Fort Saskatchewan 5 - St. John's 1
- Magog 5 - Montréal-Bourassa 3
- Richmond Hill 4 - St. John's 2
- Magog 7 - Saskatoon 3
- Montréal-Bourassa 5 - Fort Saskatchewan 2
- Magog 8 - St. John's 2
- Fort Saskatchewan 9 - Richmond Hill 0
- Montréal-Bourassa 2 - Saskatoon 1
- Fort Saskatchewan 3 - Magog 2
- St. John's 4 - Saskatoon 4
- Montréal-Bourassa 9 - Richmond Hill 2

== Playoffs ==
=== Semi-finals ===
- Magog 4 - Saskatoon 3
- Montréal-Bourassa 4 - Fort Saskatchewan 1

=== Bronze-medal game ===
- Saskatoon 6 - Fort Saskatchewan 5

=== Gold-medal game ===
- Magog 6 - Montréal-Bourassa 0

== Individual awards ==
- Most Valuable Player: Jean-François Kingsley (Montréal-Bourassa)
- Top Scorer: Josh Welter (Fort Saskatchewan)
- Top Forward: Josh Welter (Fort Saskatchewan)
- Top Defenceman: Francis Trudel (Magog)
- Top Goaltender: Geoff McIntosh (Saskatoon)
- Most Sportsmanlike Player: Brent Roach (St. John's)

== Regional Playdowns ==
=== Atlantic Region ===
- The St. John's Maple Leafs advanced by winning their regional tournament, which was played April 6–9, 2000 in St. John's, Newfoundland.

=== Quebec ===
- The Cantonniers de Magog advanced by capturing the Quebec Midget AAA League title.

=== Central Region ===
- The Richmond Hill Stars advanced by winning their regional tournament, which was played April 4–9, 2000 in Toronto, Ontario.
- Teams competing

Don Mills Flyers (host)
Lambton Lightning
Mississauga Reps
Ottawa Sting
Richmond Hill Stars
Southwest Storm
Timmins Majors

=== West Region ===
- The Saskatoon Contacts advanced by winning their regional tournament, which was played April 6–9, 2000 in Souris, Manitoba.
- Teams competing

Eastman Selects
Saskatoon Contacts
Southwest Cougars (host)
Thunder Bay Kings

=== Pacific Region ===
- The Fort Saskatchewan Rangers advanced by winning their regional tournament, which was played April 7–9, 2000 in Kamloops, British Columbia.
- Teams competing

Fort Saskatchewan Rangers
Kamloops
Northwest Territories

== See also ==
- Telus Cup
