= 1985 Air Canada Cup =

Hockey championship in Canada

Tournament details
- Venue: Regina Agridome in Regina, SK
- Dates: April 16 – 20, 1985
- Teams: 6

Final positions
- Champions: Lions du Lac St-Louis
- Runners-up: Regina Pat Canadians
- Third place: Calgary Buffaloes

Tournament statistics
- Scoring leader(s): Hal Turner; Colin Power

Awards
- MVP: Craig Suchan

The 1985 Air Canada Cup was Canada's seventh annual national midget 'AAA' hockey championship, which was played April 16 – 20, 1985 at the Regina Agridome in Regina, Saskatchewan province. The Lions du Lac St-Louis from Quebec won their second national title, defeating the host Regina Pat Canadians in the gold medal game. The Calgary Buffaloes won the bronze medal. Future National Hockey League players playing in this tournament were Benoit Brunet, Dean Chynoweth, Kevin Dahl, Claude Lapointe, Don MacLean, Lyle Odelein, Cam Russell, and Peter White.

== Teams ==
Result	Team	Region	City
1st place, gold medalist(s)	Lions du Lac St-Louis	Quebec	Dollard-des-Ormeaux, QC
2nd place, silver medalist(s)	Regina Pat Canadians	Host	Regina, SK
3rd place, bronze medalist(s)	Calgary Buffaloes	Pacific	Calgary, AB
4	Dartmouth Forbes	Atlantic	Dartmouth, NS
5	Toronto Red Wings	Central	Toronto, ON
6	Thunder Bay Comets	West	Thunder Bay, ON

== Round robin ==
=== Standings ===
Pos	Team	Pld	W	L	D	GF	GA	GD	Pts
1	Regina Pat Canadians	5	4	1	0	24	12	+12	8
2	Lions du Lac St-Louis	5	4	1	0	28	15	+13	8
3	Dartmouth Forbes	5	2	2	1	24	26	−2	5
4	Calgary Buffaloes	5	2	2	1	20	17	+3	5
5	Toronto Red Wings	5	1	2	2	14	18	−4	4
6	Thunder Bay Comets	5	0	5	0	7	29	−22	0

=== Scores ===
- Calgary 4 - Regina 1
- Toronto 4 - Thunder Bay 1
- Lac St-Louis 7 - Dartmouth 4
- Regina 4 - Toronto 2
- Lac St-Louis 5 - Thunder Bay 1
- Dartmouth 5 - Toronto 5
- Lac St-Louis 7 - Calgary 2
- Regina 10 - Dartmouth 3
- Calgary 11 - Thunder Bay 2
- Regina 7 - Lac St-Louis 3
- Calgary 2 - Toronto 2
- Dartmouth 7 - Thunder Bay 3
- Lac St-Louis 6 - Toronto 1
- Regina 2 - Thunder Bay 0
- Dartmouth 5 - Calgary 1

== Playoffs ==
=== Semi-finals ===
- Regina 5 - Calgary 1
- Lac St-Louis 5 - Dartmouth 4 (2OT)

=== Bronze-medal game ===
- Calgary 4 - Dartmouth 1

=== Gold-medal game ===
- Lac St-Louis 5 - Regina 2

== Individual awards ==
- Most Valuable Player: Craig Suchan (Regina)
- Top Scorer: Hal Turner (Dartmouth), Colin Power (Dartmouth)
- Top Forward: Claude Lapointe (Lac St-Louis)
- Top Defenceman: Shawn Anderson (Lac St-Louis)
- Top Goaltender: Craig Suchan (Regina)
- Most Sportsmanlike Player: Bryan Bosch (Calgary)

== See also ==
- Telus Cup
