= 2007 Telus Cup =

Hockey championship

Tournament details
- Venue(s): Red Deer Arena and ENMAX Centrium in Red Deer, AB
- Dates: April 23–29, 2007
- Teams: 6

Final positions
- Champions: Prince Albert Mintos
- Runners-up: Red Deer Optimist Rebels
- Third place: Blizzard de Sèminiaire Saint-François

Tournament statistics
- Scoring leader: Kyle Reynolds

Awards
- MVP: Marc Boulanger

The 2007 Telus Cup was Canada's 29th annual national midget 'AAA' hockey championship, played April 23–29, 2007 at Red Deer, Alberta. The Prince Albert Mintos went undefeated throughout the Telus Cup national tournament for the second consecutive year to defend their title, defeating the host Red Deer Optimist Rebels 3-2 in the gold medal game.

== Teams ==
| Result | Team | Region | City |
|---|---|---|---|
| 1st place, gold medalist(s) | Prince Albert Mintos | West | Prince Albert, SK |
| 2nd place, silver medalist(s) | Red Deer Optimist Rebels | Host | Red Deer, AB |
| 3rd place, bronze medalist(s) | Blizzard de Séminiaire Saint-François | Québec | Québec City, QC |
| 4 | Vancouver North West Giants | Pacific | Burnaby, BC |
| 5 | St. John's Maple Leafs | Atlantic | St. John's, NL |
| 6 | Sault Ste. Marie North Stars | Central | Sault Ste. Marie, ON |

== Round robin ==
=== Standings ===
| Pos | Team | Pld | W | L | D | GF | GA | GD | Pts |
|---|---|---|---|---|---|---|---|---|---|
| 1 | Prince Albert Mintos | 5 | 5 | 0 | 0 | 14 | 5 | +9 | 10 |
| 2 | Red Deer Optimist Rebels | 5 | 4 | 1 | 0 | 23 | 4 | +19 | 8 |
| 3 | Vancouver North West Giants | 5 | 3 | 2 | 0 | 11 | 11 | 0 | 6 |
| 4 | Blizzard de Sèminiaire Saint-François | 5 | 2 | 3 | 0 | 14 | 14 | 0 | 4 |
| 5 | St. John's Maple Leafs | 5 | 1 | 4 | 0 | 9 | 21 | −12 | 2 |
| 6 | Sault Ste. Marie North Stars | 5 | 0 | 5 | 0 | 3 | 19 | −16 | 0 |

=== Scores ===
- Prince Albert 2 - Vancouver 1
- Saint-François 3 - St. John's 1
- Red Deer 2 - Sault Ste. Marie 0
- Vancouver 2 - Sault Ste. Marie 1
- Red Deer 10 - St. John's 0
- Prince Albert 3 - Saint-François 1
- Prince Albert 3 - St. John's 2
- Red Deer 5 - Vancouver 0
- Saint-François 7 - Sault Ste. Marie 0
- Vancouver 4 - Saint-François 1
- Prince Albert 2 - Red Deer 0
- St. John's 4 - Sault Ste. Marie 1
- Prince Albert 4 - Sault Ste. Marie 1
- Vancouver 4 - St. John's 2
- Red Deer 6 - Saint-François 2

== Playoffs ==
=== Semi-finals ===
- Prince Albert 4 - Saint-François 2
- Red Deer 3 - Vancouver 2

=== Bronze-medal game ===
- Saint-François 3 - Vancouver 1

=== Gold-medal game ===
- Prince Albert 3 - Red Deer 2 (2OT)

== Individual awards ==
- Most Valuable Player: Marc Boulanger (Red Deer)
- Top Scorer: Kyle Reynolds (Red Deer)
- Top Forward: Tyler Fiddler (Prince Albert)
- Top Defenceman: Lewis Laczko (Prince Albert)
- Top Goaltender: Carsen Chubak (Prince Albert)
- Most Sportsmanlike Player: Matthew Bell (Vancouver)

== See also ==
- Telus Cup
