= 1990 Air Canada Cup =

Tournament details
- Venue: Colisée Cardin in Sorel, QC
- Dates: April 18 – 22, 1990
- Teams: 6

Final positions
- Champions: Riverains du Richelieu
- Runners-up: Gouverneurs de Ste-Foy
- Third place: Notre Dame Hounds

Awards
- MVP: Rene Corbet

The 1990 Air Canada Cup was Canada's 12th annual national midget 'AAA' hockey championship, which was played April 18 – 22, 1990 at the Colisée Cardin in Sorel, Quebec. The gold medal game was an all-Quebec showdown, as the Riverains du Richelieu defeated the Gouverneurs de Ste-Foy to become the second host team to win the national midget title. The Notre Dame Hounds took the bronze medal. Rene Corbet of Richelieu was named the tournament's Most Valuable Player. Other future National Hockey League players competing in this tournament were Philippe Boucher, Michael Peca, Scott Fraser, and Pascal Rhéaume.

== Teams ==
Result	Team	Region	City
1st place, gold medalist(s)	Riverains du Richelieu	Host	Sorel, QC
2nd place, silver medalist(s)	Gouverneurs de Ste-Foy	Quebec	Ste-Foy, QC
3rd place, bronze medalist(s)	Notre Dame Hounds	West	Wilcox, SK
4	St. Albert Eagle Raiders	Pacific	St. Albert, AB
5	Toronto Red Wings	Central	Toronto, ON
6	Fredericton Red Wings	Atlantic	Fredericton, NB

== Round robin ==
=== Standings ===
Pos	Team	Pld	W	L	D	GF	GA	GD	Pts
1	Gouverneurs de Ste-Foy	5	4	0	1	22	13	+9	9
2	Notre Dame Hounds	5	3	1	1	16	9	+7	7
3	Riverains du Richelieu	5	3	1	1	11	11	0	7
4	St. Albert Eagle Raiders	5	2	3	0	20	30	−10	4
5	Toronto Red Wings	5	1	3	1	17	23	−6	3
6	Fredericton Red Wings	5	0	5	0	11	21	−10	0

=== Scores ===
- Richelieu 5 - Toronto 2
- Ste-Foy 4 - Fredericton 2
- Notre Dame 5 - St. Albert 0
- Richelieu 2 - Fredericton 0
- Ste-Foy 5 - Toronto 2
- Notre Dame 3 - Richelieu 1
- Ste-Foy 6 - St. Albert 5
- Toronto 6 - Fredericton 3
- Richelieu 10 - St. Albert 2
- Ste-Foy 4 - Notre Dame 1
- St. Albert 8 - Toronto 5
- Notre Dame 4 - Fredericton 2
- Richelieu 3 - Ste. Foy 3
- Toronto 2 - Notre Dame 2
- St. Albert 5 - Fredericton 4

== Playoffs ==
=== Semi-finals ===
- Ste-Foy 2 - St. Albert 0
- Richelieu 5 - Notre Dame 4 OT

=== Bronze-medal game ===
- Notre Dame 5 - St. Albert 3

=== Gold-medal game ===
- Richelieu 7 - Ste-Foy 2

== Individual awards ==
- Most Valuable Player: Rene Corbet (Richelieu)
- Most Sportsmanlike Player: Normand Paquet (Ste-Foy)

== See also ==
- Telus Cup
