= 1984 Air Canada Cup =

Tournament details
- Venue: North Bay Memorial Gardens in North Bay, ON
- Dates: April 17 – 21, 1984
- Teams: 6

Final positions
- Champions: North Bay Pinehill
- Runners-up: Notre Dame Hounds
- Third place: Lions du Lac St-Louis

Tournament statistics
- Scoring leader: Barry Gilberson

Awards
- MVP: Guy Girouard

The 1984 Air Canada Cup was Canada's sixth annual national midget 'AAA' hockey championship, which was played April 17 – 21, 1984 at the North Bay Memorial Gardens in North Bay, Ontario. Prior to the season, the Canadian Amateur Hockey Association overhauled the format of the Air Canada Cup. Under the new format, the twelve branch champions would compete in five regional playoffs to qualify for the national championship. They would be joined by the host team to round out the six-team field.

The host North Bay Pinehill ended up winning the first gold medal under the Air Canada Cup's new format. The Notre Dame Hounds and Lions du Lac St-Louis took silver and bronze, respectively. Future National Hockey League players competing in the 1984 tournament were Shawn Anderson, Ian Herbers, Claude Lapointe, Don MacLean, Mike O'Neill, Randy McKay, Myles O'Connor, Luke Richardson, Cam Russell, Darren Turcotte, and Brad Werenka.

== Teams ==
Result	Team	Region	City
1st place, gold medalist(s)	North Bay Pinehill	Host	North Bay, ON
2nd place, silver medalist(s)	Notre Dame Hounds	West	Wilcox, SK
3rd place, bronze medalist(s)	Lions du Lac St-Louis	Quebec	Dollard-des-Ormeaux, QC
4	Sherwood Park Chain Gang	Pacific	Sherwood Park, AB
5	Ottawa West Golden Knights	Central	Ottawa, ON
6	Dartmouth Forbes	Atlantic	Dartmouth, NS

== Round robin ==
=== Standings ===
Pos	Team	Pld	W	L	D	GF	GA	GD	Pts
1	North Bay Pinehill	5	4	0	1	23	7	+16	9
2	Lions du Lac St-Louis	5	4	0	1	18	6	+12	9
3	Notre Dame Hounds	5	3	2	0	16	7	+9	6
4	Sherwood Park Chain Gang	5	1	3	1	14	15	−1	3
5	Ottawa West Golden Knights	5	0	3	2	14	23	−9	2
6	Dartmouth Forbes	5	0	4	1	6	33	−27	1

=== Scores ===
- North Bay 5 - Ottawa West 3
- Notre Dane 3 - Sherwood Park 0
- Lac St-Louis 6 - Dartmouth 1
- North Bay 5 - Sherwood Park 1
- Notre Dame 4 - Ottawa West 0
- Ottawa West 5 - Sherwood Park 5
- Notre Dame 7 - Dartmouth 0
- Lac St-Louis 1 - Sherwood Park 0
- North Bay 9 - Dartmouth 1
- Lac St-Louis 6 - Ottawa West 3
- North Bay 3 - Notre Dame 1
- Sherwood Park 8 - Dartmouth 1
- Lac St-Louis 4 - Notre Dame 1
- Ottawa West 3 - Dartmouth 3
- Lac St-Louis 1 - North Bay 1

== Playoffs ==
=== Semi-finals ===
- North Bay 5 - Sherwood Park 4 (2OT)
- Notre Dame 7 - Lac St-Louis 4

=== Bronze-medal game ===
- Lac St-Louis 5 - Sherwood Park 4 (2OT)

=== Gold-medal game ===
- North Bay 5 - Notre Dame 3

== Individual awards ==
- Most Valuable Player: Guy Girouard (North Bay)
- Top Scorer: Barry Gilberson (Ottawa West)
- Top Forward: Steve Rosebrook (Ottawa West)
- Top Defenceman: Sean Whitham (Sherwood Park)
- Top Goaltender: Bill Horn (Notre Dame)
- Most Sportsmanlike Player: Ron Pitre (Dartmouth)

== See also ==
- Telus Cup
