= 1986 Air Canada Cup =

Tournament details
- Venue: Moncton Coliseum in Moncton, NB
- Dates: April 15–19, 1986
- Teams: 6

Final positions
- Champions: Notre Dame Hounds
- Runners-up: Toronto Redwings
- Third place: Gouverneurs de Ste-Foy

Tournament statistics
- Scoring leader: Michel Picard

Awards
- MVP: Brent Bobyck

The 1986 Air Canada Cup was Canada's eighth annual national midget 'AAA' hockey championship, which was played April 15–19, 1986 at the Moncton Coliseum in Moncton, New Brunswick. The Notre Dame Hounds from Wilcox, Saskatchewan won their second national title, defeating the Toronto Redwings in the gold medal game. The Gouverneurs de Ste-Foy won the bronze medal. Future National Hockey League players competing in this tournament were Rod Brind'Amour, Scott Pellerin, Frédéric Chabot, Michel Picard, Yves Racine, and most notably, future Hall of Famer Joe Sakic, who was a member of the Burnaby Hawks.

== Teams ==
Result	Team	Region	City
1st place, gold medalist(s)	Notre Dame Hounds	West	Wilcox, Saskatchewan
2nd place, silver medalist(s)	Toronto Redwings	Central	Toronto
3rd place, bronze medalist(s)	Gouverneurs de Ste-Foy	Quebec	Ste-Foy, Quebec
4	St. John's Avalon	Atlantic	St. John's, Newfoundland and Labrador
5	Moncton Flyers	Host	Moncton, New Brunswick
6	Burnaby Hawks	Pacific	Burnaby, BC

== Round robin ==
=== Standings ===
Pos	Team	Pld	W	L	D	GF	GA	GD	Pts
1	Notre Dame Hounds	5	5	0	0	33	10	+23	10
2	Gouverneurs de Ste-Foy	5	4	1	0	31	14	+17	8
3	Toronto Red Wings	5	2	2	1	20	26	−6	5
4	St. John's Avalon	5	1	3	1	18	34	−16	3
5	Moncton Flyers	5	1	4	0	24	34	−10	2
6	Burnaby Hawks	5	1	4	0	16	24	−8	2

=== Scores ===
- Moncton 8 – Burnaby 5
- Toronto 4 – St. John's 4
- Notre Dame 3 – Ste-Foy 1
- Toronto 6 – Moncton 2
- Ste-Foy 11 – St. John's 2
- Notre Dame 10 – Toronto 1
- Ste-Foy 4 – Burnaby 1
- Notre Dame 7 – Moncton 4
- Burnaby 5 – St. John's 2
- Ste-Foy 9 – Moncton 5
- Toronto 6 – Burnaby 4
- Ste-Foy 6 – Toronto 3
- Notre Dame 9 – St. John's 3
- St. John's 7 – Moncton 5
- Notre Dame 4 – Burnaby 1

== Playoffs ==
=== Semi-finals ===
- Notre Dame 10 – St. John's 1
- Toronto 7 – Ste- Foy 4

=== Bronze-medal game ===
- Ste-Foy 7 – St. John's 6

=== Gold-medal game ===
- Notre Dame 8 – Toronto 5

== Individual awards ==
- Most Valuable Player: Brent Bobyck (Notre Dame)
- Top Scorer: Michel Picard (Ste-Foy)
- Top Forward: Benoit Groulx (Ste-Foy)
- Top Defenceman: Brent Bobyck (Notre Dame)
- Top Goaltender: Frédéric Chabot (Ste-Foy)
- Most Sportsmanlike Player: Andrew McKim (Moncton)

== See also ==
- Telus Cup
