= 1995 Air Canada Cup =

Tournament details
- Venue: Sherbrooke, QC
- Dates: April 19 – 25, 1995
- Teams: 6

Final positions
- Champions: Thunder Bay Kings
- Runners-up: Red Deer Chiefs
- Third place: Gouverneurs de Ste-Foy

Tournament statistics
- Scoring leader: Jesse Heerema

Awards
- MVP: David Cinelli

The 1995 Air Canada Cup was Canada's 17th annual national midget 'AAA' hockey championship, which was played April 19 – 25, 1995 at Sherbrooke, Quebec. The Thunder Bay Kings defeated the Red Deer Chiefs in the championship game to win the gold medal. The Gouverneurs de Ste-Foy won the bronze medal. Future National Hockey League players competing in this tournament were Brad Leeb and Derek Morris.

== Teams ==
Result	Team	Region	City
1st place, gold medalist(s)	Thunder Bay Kings	West	Thunder Bay, ON
2nd place, silver medalist(s)	Red Deer Optimist Chiefs	Pacific	Red Deer, AB
3rd place, bronze medalist(s)	Gouverneurs de Ste-Foy	Quebec	Sainte-Foy, QC
4	Wexford Raiders	Central	Scarborough, ON
5	Cantonniers de Magog	Host	Magog, QC
6	Dartmouth Subways	Atlantic	Dartmouth, NS

== Round robin ==
=== Standings ===
Pos	Team	Pld	W	L	D	GF	GA	GD	Pts
1	Thunder Bay Kings	5	4	0	1	15	8	+7	9
2	Gouverneurs de Ste-Foy	5	3	2	0	14	9	+5	6
3	Red Deer Chiefs	5	2	2	1	17	8	+9	5
4	Wexford Raiders	5	2	3	0	13	17	−4	4
5	Cantonniers de Magog	5	2	3	0	7	12	−5	4
6	Dartmouth Subways	5	1	4	0	7	20	−13	2

=== Scores ===
- Thunder Bay 2 - Red Deer 2
- Ste-Foy 4 - Dartmouth 0
- Wexford 3 - Magog 0
- Ste-Foy 2 - Red Deer 1
- Thunder Bay 2 - Magog 1
- Dartmouth 4 - Wexford 2
- Magog 2 - Ste-Foy 1
- Thunder Bay 5 - Wexford 3
- Red Deer 8 - Dartmouth 1
- Ste-Foy 6 - Wexford 3
- Magog 3 - Dartmouth 1
- Wexford 2 - Red Deer 1
- Thunder Bay 3 - Dartmouth 1
- Red Deer 5 - Magog 1
- Thunder Bay 3 - Ste-Foy 1

== Playoffs ==
=== Semi-finals ===
- Thunder Bay 5 - Wexford 1
- Red Deer 6 - Ste-Foy 4

=== Bronze-medal game ===
- Ste-Foy 4 - Wexford 3

=== Gold-medal game ===
- Thunder Bay 4 - Red Deer 3

== Individual awards ==
- Most Valuable Player: David Cinelli (Wexford)
- Top Scorer: Jesse Heerema (Thunder Bay)
- Top Forward: Josh Lazzari (Red Deer)
- Top Defenceman: Derek Morris (Red Deer)
- Top Goaltender: David Cinelli (Wexford)
- Most Sportsmanlike Player: Bryan Boorman (Red Deer)

== See also ==
- Telus Cup
