= 1996 Air Canada Cup =

Tournament details
- Venue: Kamloops Memorial Arena in Kamloops, BC
- Dates: April 16–21, 1996
- Teams: 6

Final positions
- Champions: Gouverneurs de Ste-Foy
- Runners-up: Thunder Bay Kings
- Third place: North Kamloops Lions

Tournament statistics
- Scoring leader: Ken MacPherson

Awards
- MVP: Derek Paget

The 1996 Air Canada Cup was Canada's 18th annual national midget 'AAA' hockey championship, played April 16–21, 1996 at the Kamloops Memorial Arena in Kamloops, British Columbia. The Gouverneurs de Ste-Foy defeated the Thunder Bay Kings in the championship game to win the gold medal. The host North Kamloops Lions won the bronze medal. Future National Hockey League players competing in this tournament were Brad Stuart and Simon Gagné.

== Teams ==
Result	Team	Region	City
1st place, gold medalist(s)	Gouverneurs de Ste-Foy	Quebec	Sainte-Foy, QC
2nd place, silver medalist(s)	Thunder Bay Kings	West	Thunder Bay, ON
3rd place, bronze medalist(s)	North Kamloops Lions	Host	Kamloops, BC
4	Red Deer Optimist Chiefs	Pacific	Red Deer, AB
5	Dartmouth Subways	Atlantic	Dartmouth, NS
6	New Liskeard Cubs	Central	New Liskeard, ON

== Round robin ==
=== Standings ===
Pos	Team	Pld	W	L	D	GF	GA	GD	Pts
1	Thunder Bay Kings	5	3	2	0	22	19	+3	6
2	North Kamloops Lions	5	3	2	0	27	15	+12	6
3	Gouverneurs de Ste-Foy	5	3	2	0	24	20	+4	6
4	Red Deer Optimist Chiefs	5	2	2	1	17	15	+2	5
5	Dartmouth Subways	5	1	2	2	18	25	−7	4
6	New Liskeard Cubs	5	1	3	1	16	30	−14	3

=== Scores ===
- New Liskeard 6 - Dartmouth 6
- Ste-Foy 3 - Red Deer 1
- Thunder Bay 6 - North Kamloops 3
- Ste-Foy 4 - Dartmouth 2
- Thunder Bay 6 - New Liskeard 3
- North Kamloops 6 - Red Deer 2
- Ste-Foy 10 - New Liskeard 2
- Red Deer 4 - Dartmouth 4
- Thunder Bay 8 - Ste-Foy 5
- New Liskeard 3 - North Kamloops 2
- Red Deer 4 - Thunder Bay 0
- North Kamloops 7 - Ste-Foy 2
- Dartmouth 4 - Thunder Bay 2
- Red Deer 6 - New Liskeard 2
- North Kamloops 9 - Dartmouth 2

== Playoffs ==
=== Semi-finals ===
- Thunder Bay 6 - Red Deer 2
- Ste-Foy 2 - North Kamloops 1

=== Bronze-medal game ===
- North Kamloops 2 - Red Deer 1

=== Gold-medal game ===
- Ste-Foy 6 - Thunder Bay 4

== Individual awards ==
- Most Valuable Player: Derek Paget (North Kamloops)
- Top Scorer: Ken MacPherson (Dartmouth)
- Top Forward: Francois Fortier (Ste-Foy)
- Top Defenceman: Paul Manning (Red Deer)
- Top Goaltender: Joey Stephenson (Red Deer)
- Most Sportsmanlike Player: Jesse Pyatt (Thunder Bay)
- Air Canada Scholarship: Derek Paget (North Kamloops)
- Esso Scholarship: Shawn Hebert (Thunder Bay)

== See also ==
- Telus Cup
