= Telus Cup =

Canadian under-18 ice hockey club championships

- Current season, competition or edition: 2025 Telus Cup
- Formerly: Air Canada Cup (1979–2003)
- Sport: Ice hockey
- First season: 1979
- Country: Canada
- Most recent champion: Regina Pat Canadians (2025)
- Most titles: Regina Pat Canadians, Notre Dame Hounds (5)
- Broadcasters: TSN (English); RDS (French)
- Sponsors: Hockey Canada; Telus
- Website: Telus Cup website

The Telus Cup is Canada's national under-18 ice hockey club championship. It is an annual event, held by Hockey Canada each April. From 1979 to 2003, the national championship was sponsored by Air Canada.

The current champions are the Regina Pat Canadians who won the 2025 Telus Cup.

== History ==
=== Wrigley Cup (1973–1978) ===
The forerunner to the Canadian national under-18 championship was the Wrigley National Midget Hockey Tournament, which ran from 1974 though 1978. Canadian Amateur Hockey Association president Jack Devine announced the sanction of the new national midget hockey tournament for the top 12 teams in the country, with the Wrigley Company being the initial sponsor. Gord Renwick organized the first event in 1974, and served as the tournament chairman. The 1974 Wrigley Cup was scheduled at the Oshawa Civic Auditorium, with the winning team would earn a trip to the Soviet Union, and future events would be rotated around Canada.

In 1973, prior to Wrigley, the Prince Edward Island provincial government co-sponsored it as part of their "Come Home Year" celebrations. The Wrigley was an invitational event, with each of Canadian Hockey's branches declaring their respective champions through playdowns held during the Christmas and New Year's holidays. The champions were invited to take part in the Wrigley each January, a host team comprised the final competitor.

Each year, the winning team represented Canada in the Soviet Union for a series of games against elite teams, including the Soviet Midget Red Army in Moscow, Leningrad, and Riga. The Verdun Midget Maple Leafs won the first Wrigley championship in 1974, defeating Kingston Gurnsey Realtors of Ontario 5–3. The final game was televised live coast-to-coast by the CTV Television Network. Media in USSR reported that the last game between the Leafs and the Red Army team in Moscow was viewed by more than 100 million people on Soviet television, although there were only two television channels in Russia at that time. Verdun lost to the National Russian Team, 6–5.

=== Air Canada Cup (1979–2003) ===
Canada's official national midget championship, the Air Canada Cup, was established in 1979. The inaugural tournament was held in Winnipeg, Manitoba and used a format similar to the Wrigley. Each of Canada's twelve branches determined their champions through their own playoff system. The branch champions advanced to the national tournament to play for the Air Canada Cup.

In 1984, the Air Canada Cup was revised to the current six-team format. Five regional champions, decided by inter-branch competition (except for Québec), and a predetermined host team play a round-robin with the top four teams qualifying for the playoff round. A total of 19 games are played over six days of competition.

=== Telus Cup (2004–present) ===
After Air Canada's sponsorship ended in 2003, Telus Communications Inc, a subsidiary of Telus Corporation signed on as the new title sponsor and the national championship was rechristened as the Telus Cup in October 2004.

Teams from Saskatchewan and Quebec have been dominant at this event and have captured the most medals. The most successful teams include the Notre Dame Hounds, Regina Pat Canadians, Prince Albert Mintos, Lac St-Louis Lions, Richelieu Riverains (now Collège Charles-Lemoyne), and Red Deer Rebels/Chiefs.

Each year's gold medal game is televised nationally on TSN (English) and RDS (French).

== Winners and hosts ==
Wrigley Cup
Year	Gold Medal	Silver Medal	Bronze Medal	Location
1974	Verdun Leafs	Kingston Realtors	Hull Kiwanis	Oshawa, ON
1975	Barrie Co-ops	Verdun Leafs	Oshawa Parkway	Oshawa, ON
1976	Calgary Spurs	Toronto Nationals	Swift Current Legionnaires	Calgary, AB
1977	Don Mills Flyers	Lions du Lac St-Louis	Burnaby Winter Club	Moncton, NB
1978	Couillard de Ste-Foy	East Ottawa Voyageurs	Toronto-Wexford	Verdun, QC

Air Canada/Telus Cup
Year	Gold Medal	Silver Medal	Bronze Medal	Location
1979	Couillard de Ste-Foy	St. Michael's College Buzzers	Notre Dame Hounds	Winnipeg, MB
1980	Notre Dame Hounds	Gouverneurs de Ste-Foy	North Shore Winter Club	Cornwall, ON
1981	Lions du Lac St-Louis	Kitchener Greenshirts	Antigonish Novas	Halifax, NS
1982	Burnaby Winter Club	Gouverneurs de Ste-Foy	Cape Breton Colonels; South Ottawa Warriors (tie)	Victoria, BC
1983	Regina Pat Canadians	Gouverneurs de Ste-Foy	Andrews Maroons	Ste-Foy, QC
1984	North Bay Pine Hill	Notre Dame Hounds	Lions du Lac St-Louis	North Bay, ON
1985	Lions du Lac St-Louis	Regina Pat Canadians	Calgary Buffaloes	Regina, SK
1986	Notre Dame Hounds	Toronto Redwings	Gouverneurs de Ste-Foy	Moncton, NB
1987	Riverains du Richelieu	Notre Dame Hounds	Calgary Buffaloes	Gloucester, ON
1988	Regina Pat Canadians	Calgary Northstars	Thunder Bay Bearcats	Thunder Bay, ON
1989	Calgary Buffaloes	Regina Pat Canadians	Wexford Raiders	St. John's, NL
1990	Riverains du Richelieu	Gouverneurs de Ste-Foy	Notre Dame Hounds	Sorel, QC
1991	Calgary Northstars	Sherwood Park Chain Gang	Lions du Lac St-Louis	Calgary, AB
1992	Lions du Lac St-Louis	Thunder Bay Kings	Dartmouth Kings	Dartmouth, NS
1993	Yorkton Mallers	Gouverneurs de Ste-Foy	Sault Ste Marie Legion	Kitchener, ON
1994	Regina Pat Canadians	Red Deer Chiefs	L'Intrepide de Gatineau	Brandon, MB
1995	Thunder Bay Kings	Red Deer Chiefs	Gouverneurs de Ste-Foy	Sherbrooke, QC
1996	Gouverneurs de Ste-Foy	Thunder Bay Kings	North Kamloops Lions	Kamloops, BC
1997	Thunder Bay Kings	New Liskeard Cubs	Calgary Royals	New Glasgow, NS
1998	Riverains du C.C. Lemoyne	Sudbury Nickel Capitals	Calgary Buffaloes	Sudbury, ON
1999	Regina Pat Canadians	Calgary Flames	Gouverneurs de Ste-Foy	Prince Albert, SK
2000	Cantonniers de Magog	C.F. de Montréal-Bourassa	Saskatoon Contacts	Montréal, QC
2001	Gouverneurs de Ste-Foy	Calgary Royals	Toronto Young Nationals	Prince George, BC
2002	Tisdale Trojans	Dartmouth Subways	Riverains du C.C. Lemoyne	Bathurst, NB
2003	Calgary Northstars	Gaulois du Collège Antoine-Girouard	St. John's Maple Leafs	Sault Ste Marie, ON
2004	Brandon Wheat Kings	Riverains du C.C. Lemoyne	Red Deer Chiefs	Kenora, ON
2005	Saskatoon Contacts	L'Intrépide de Gatineau	Commandeurs de Lévis	Gatineau, QC
2006	Prince Albert Mintos	Calgary Buffaloes	Patriotes de Châteauguay	Charlottetown, PEI
2007	Prince Albert Mintos	Red Deer Chiefs	Blizzard du Sém. St-François	Red Deer, AB
2008	Sudbury Nickel Capital Wolves	Winnipeg Thrashers	Blizzard du Sém. St-François	Arnprior, Ontario
2009	Notre Dame Hounds	Calgary Buffaloes	R.S. de Laval-Bourassa	Selkirk, MB
2010	Notre Dame Hounds	Mississauga Reps	St. John's Fog Devils	Lévis, QC
2011	Winnipeg Thrashers	London Jr. Knights	Lac St-Louis Lions	St. John's, NL
2012	Red Deer Chiefs	Phénix du Collège Esther-Blondin	Saskatoon Contacts	Leduc, AB
2013	Red Deer Chiefs	Ottawa Junior 67's	R.R. de Laval-Montréal	Sault Ste Marie, ON
2014	Prince Albert Mintos	Grenadiers de Châteauguay	Okanagan Rockets	Moose Jaw, SK
2015	Toronto Young Nationals	Grenadiers de Châteauguay	Regina Pat Canadians	Rivière-du-Loup, QC
2016	North York Rangers	Saint John Vito's	Lac St-Louis Lions	Quispamsis, NB
2017	Cape Breton West Islanders	Blizzard du Sém. St-François	Mississauga Rebels	Prince George, BC
2018	Notre Dame Hounds	Cantonniers de Magog	Lethbridge Hurricanes	Sudbury, ON
2019	Toronto Young Nationals	Cantonniers de Magog	Tisdale Trojans	Thunder Bay, ON
2020	cancelled (Note: Hockey Canada cancelled the 2020 and 2021 Telus Cups in response to the COVID-19 pandemic)			Saint-Hyacinthe, QC (Note: Saint-Hyacinthe, QC was to be the host of the cancelled 2020 Telus Cup and hosted it in 2023.)
2021	cancelled			Saint-Hyacinthe, QC
2022	Moncton Flyers	Cantonniers de Magog		Okotoks, AB (Note: Membertou, NS, was originally selected to host the 2021 Telus Cup, but was moved to 2022 because of the COVID-19 pandemic. In 2022 Hockey Canada moved the location of the tournament to Okotoks, AB, however the Sydney Rush of Nova Scotia remained the host team.)
2023	Blizzard du Sém. St-François	Gaulois de Saint-Hyacinthe	Saskatoon Blazers	Saint-Hyacinthe, QC
2024	Cantonniers de Magog	Brandon Wheat Kings	Calgary Buffaloes	Membertou, NS
2025	Regina Pat Canadians	Chevaliers de Lévis	Moncton Flyers	Chilliwack, BC
