= Kamloops Memorial Arena =

Ice hockey arena in Kamloops, British Columbia

Coordinates: 50.6763°N 120.3232°W

The Kamloops Memorial Arena is an ice hockey arena built in 1948 in Kamloops, British Columbia. It hosted the Western Hockey League teams including the Kamloops Chiefs, Kamloops Junior Oilers and, most notably, the Kamloops Blazers. It was replaced in 1992 by the new Riverside Coliseum (now known as the Sandman Centre). However, the old arena still stands and is used for other levels of hockey, as well as lacrosse.

Memorial Arena was the result of a number of community organizations banding together. Innovative fundraising strategies, such as raffles, were strongly supported by the community at large. Accomplishing a project of this magnitude, largely as the result of the efforts by the community, is a testament to how Kamloopsians can come together as well as how much they supported another memorial to World War I and World War II. The arena was designed by architect, C.B.K. Norman and was constructed by J.C. Taylor & Son. opened in 1949.

The arena is now home to the North Kamloops Midget AAA Lions who have won the British Columbia Midget AAA championship nine times (1959–69, 1960–61, 1965–66, 1975–76, 1991–92, 1992–93, 1994–95, 1998–99, and 1999–00); the arena is also home to Thompson Rivers University Hockey, who played their first season in 2009–2010.

== Gallery ==
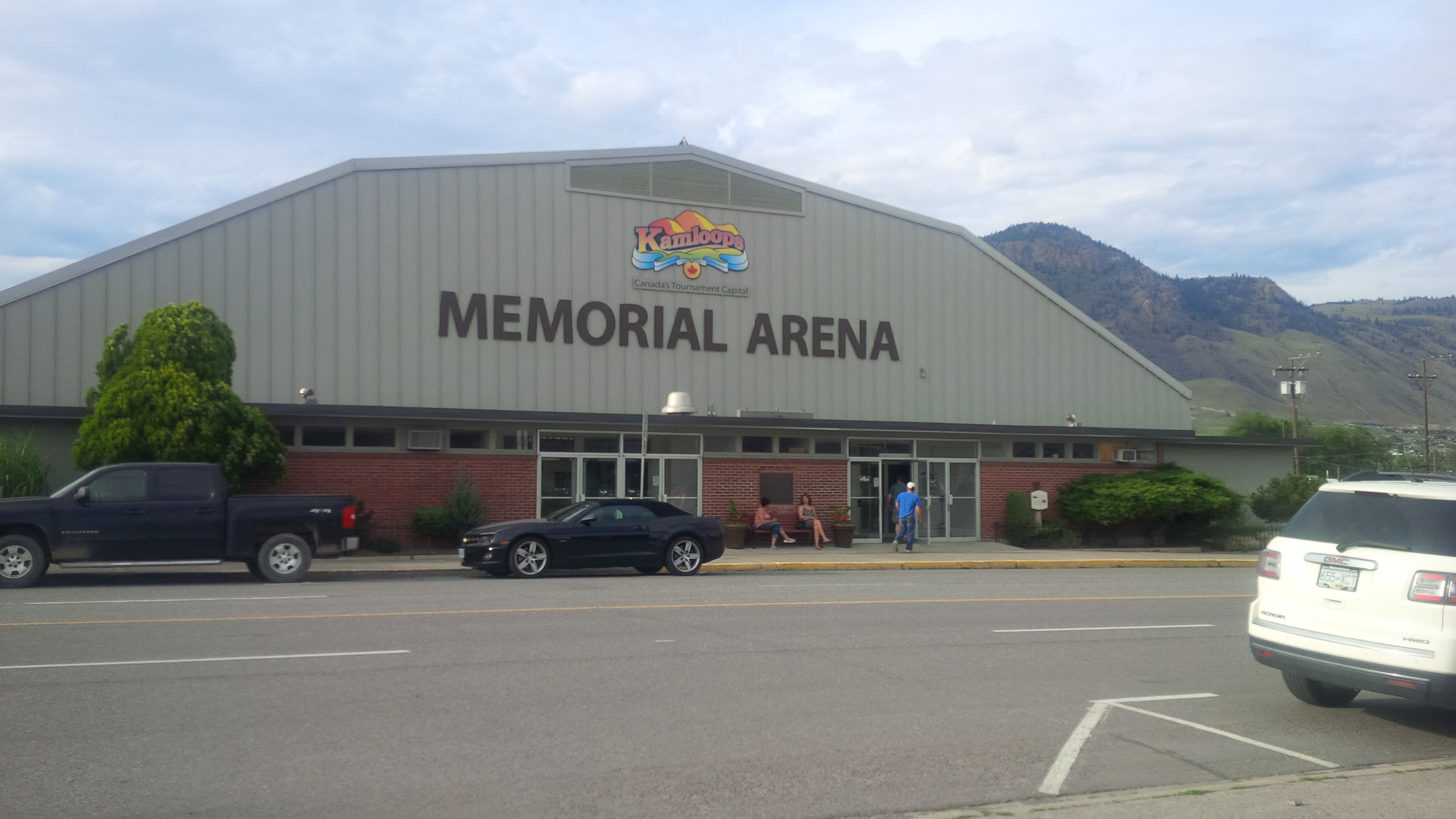
Exterior

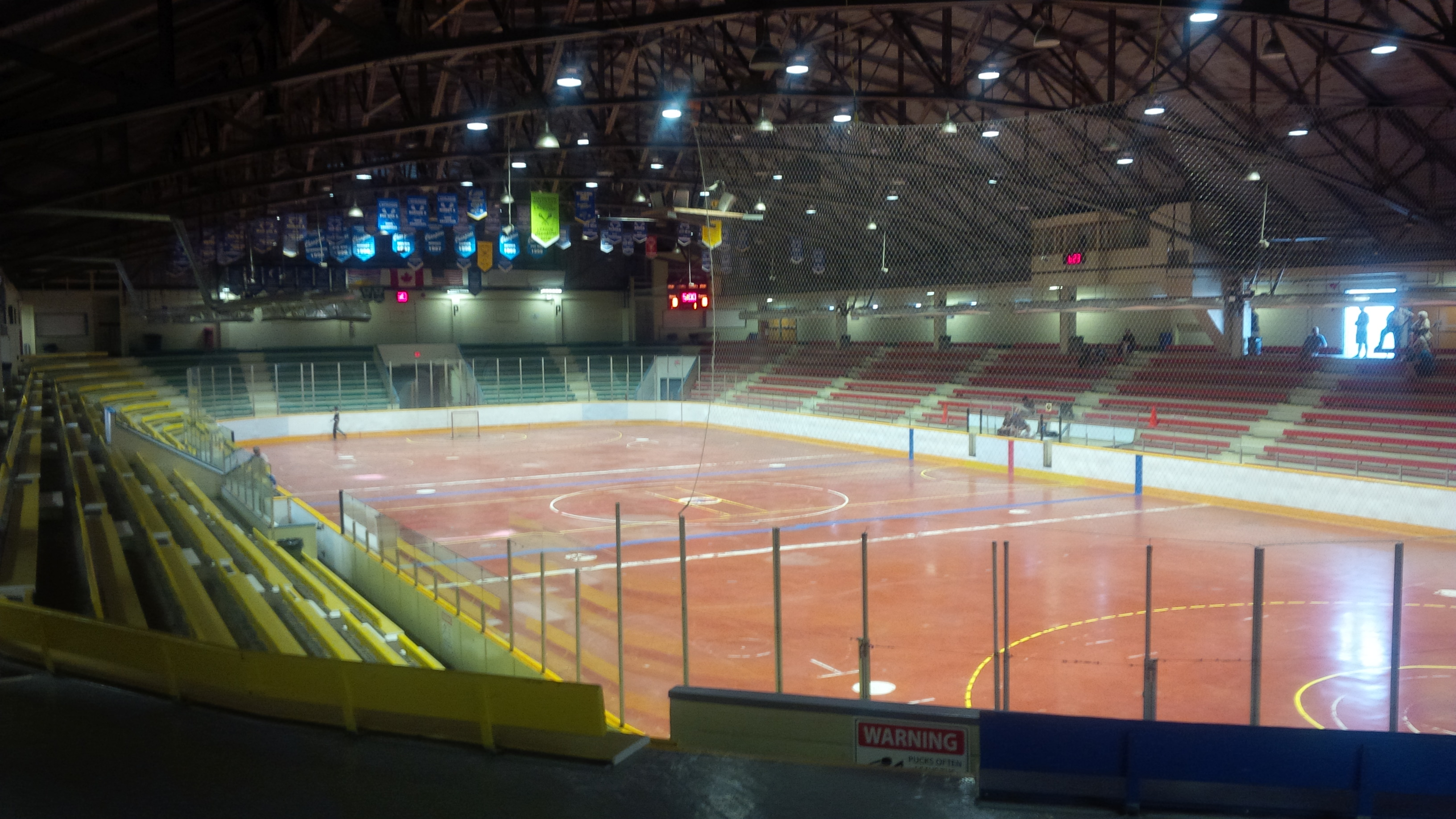
Interior
