= 2003 Air Canada Cup =

Tournament details
- Venue: Sault Memorial Gardens in Sault Ste. Marie, ON
- Dates: April 21–27, 2003
- Teams: 6

Final positions
- Champions: Calgary Northstars
- Runners-up: Collège Antoine-Girouard
- Third place: St. John's Maple Leafs

Tournament statistics
- Scoring leader: Mathieu Aubin

Awards
- MVP: Ted Purcell

The 2003 Air Canada Cup was Canada's 25th annual national midget 'AAA' hockey championship, played April 21–27, 2003 at the Sault Memorial Gardens in Sault Ste. Marie, Ontario. The Calgary Northstars defeated the Gaulois du Collège Antoine-Girouard 5-1 in the gold medal game to win the national title. It also marked the last season that the midget championship was known as the Air Canada Cup; it would be renamed the Telus Cup.

Future National Hockey League players competing in this tournament were Kris Letang, Jay Beagle, Colin Greening, and Teddy Purcell, who was named the most valuable player of the tournament.

== Teams ==
Result	Team	Region	City
1st place, gold medalist(s)	Calgary Northstars	Pacific	Calgary, AB
2nd place, silver medalist(s)	Gaulois du Collège Antoine-Girouard	Quebec	Saint-Hyacinthe, QC
3rd place, bronze medalist(s)	St. John's Maple Leafs	Atlantic	St. John's, NL
4	Yorkton Harvest	West	Yorkton, SK
5	Waterloo Wolves	Central	Waterloo, ON
6	Sault Ste. Marie North Stars	Host	Sault Ste. Marie, ON

== Round robin ==
=== Standings ===
Pos	Team	Pld	W	L	D	GF	GA	GD	Pts
1	Gaulois du Collège Antoine-Girouard	5	5	0	0	23	6	+17	10
2	Calgary Northstars	5	4	1	0	15	12	+3	8
3	Yorkton Harvest	5	3	2	0	14	13	+1	6
4	St. John's Maple Leafs	5	2	3	0	12	15	−3	4
5	Waterloo Wolves	5	1	4	0	13	18	−5	2
6	Sault Ste. Marie North Stars	5	0	5	0	10	23	−13	0

=== Scores ===
- Collège Antoine-Girouard 7 - Calgary 0
- Yorkton 4 - St. John's 0
- Waterloo 4 - Sault Ste Marie 3
- Calgary 4 - Waterloo 3
- Collège Antoine-Girouard 7 - Yorkton 3
- St. John's 6 - Sault Ste. Marie 2
- Collège Antoine-Girouard 2 - St. John's 1
- Yorkton 2 - Waterloo 1
- Calgary 6 - Sault Ste. Marie 2
- Calgary 2 - Yorkton 1
- St. John's 4 - Waterloo 3
- Collège Antoine-Girouard 2 - Sault Ste. Marie 0
- Collège Antoine-Girouard 5 - Waterloo 2
- Yorkton 5 - Sault Ste. Marie 3
- Calgary 4 - St. John's 0

== Playoffs ==
=== Semi-finals ===
- Collège Antoine-Girouard 3 - St. John's 2
- Calgary 2 - Yorkton 1

=== Bronze-medal game ===
- St. John's 5 - Yorkton 4

=== Gold-medal game ===
- Calgary 5 - Collège Antoine-Girouard 1

== Individual awards ==
- Most Valuable Player: Ted Purcell (St. John's)
- Top Scorer: Mathieu Aubin (Collège Antoine-Girouard)
- Top Forward: Alexandre Imbeault (Collège Antoine-Girouard)
- Top Defenceman: Dustin Nehring (Yorkton)
- Top Goaltender: Justin Mzarek (Yorkton)
- Most Sportsmanlike Player: Justin St. Louis (Calgary)

== See also ==
- Telus Cup
