= 1987 Air Canada Cup =

Tournament details
- Venue: Earl Armstrong Arena in Gloucester, ON
- Dates: April 1987
- Teams: 6

Final positions
- Champions: Riverains du Richelieu
- Runners-up: Notre Dame Hounds
- Third place: Calgary Buffaloes

Tournament statistics
- Scoring leader: Reggie Savage

Awards
- MVP: Reggie Savage

The 1987 Air Canada Cup was Canada's ninth annual national midget 'AAA' hockey championship, which was played in April 1987 at the Earl Armstrong Arena in Gloucester, Ottawa city, Ontario province. The Riverains du Richelieu defeated the Notre Dame Hounds to win their first national title. The Calgary Buffaloes won the bronze medal. Future National Hockey League players competing in this tournament were Rod Brind'Amour, Scott Pellerin, Reggie Savage, Olaf Kölzig, and Stephane Fiset. Savage, playing for Richelieu, was the tournament's top scorer and named Most Valuable Player.

== Teams ==
Result	Team	Region	City
1st place, gold medalist(s)	Riverains du Richelieu	Quebec	Sorel, QC
2nd place, silver medalist(s)	Notre Dame Hounds	West	Wilcox, SK
3rd place, bronze medalist(s)	Calgary Buffaloes	Pacific	Calgary, AB
4	Sudbury Burgess Powertrains	Central	Sudbury, ON
5	Gloucester Rangers	Host	Gloucester, ON
6	Dartmouth Forbes	Atlantic	Dartmouth, NS

== Round robin ==
=== Standings ===
Pos	Team	Pld	W	L	D	GF	GA	GD	Pts
1	Riverains du Richelieu	5	5	0	0	19	8	+11	10
2	Notre Dame Hounds	5	3	1	1	21	9	+12	7
3	Calgary Buffaloes	5	3	2	0	16	14	+2	6
4	Sudbury Burgess Powertrains	5	2	3	0	13	16	−3	4
5	Gloucester Rangers	5	1	4	0	14	24	−10	2
6	Dartmouth Forbes	5	1	4	0	14	25	−11	2

=== Scores ===
- Notre Dame 9 - Gloucester 5
- Richelieu 5 - Dartmouth 1
- Calgary 4 - Sudbury 2
- Gloucester 3 - Dartmouth 2
- Richelieu 2 - Notre Dame 1
- Sudbury 3 - Gloucester 2
- Richelieu 3 - Calgary 2
- Notre Dame 7 - Dartmouth 2
- Calgary 5 - Gloucester 2
- Richelieu 4 - Sudbury 2
- Notre Dame 4 - Calgary 0
- Dartmouth 6 - Sudbury 5
- Richelieu 5 - Gloucester 2
- Sudbury 1 - Notre Dame 0
- Calgary 5 - Dartmouth 3

== Playoffs ==
=== Semi-finals ===
- Richelieu 7 - Sudbury 5
- Notre Dame 5 - Calgary 4 (2OT)

=== Bronze-medal game ===
- Calgary 8 - Sudbury 2

=== Gold-medal game ===
- Richelieu 6 - Notre Dame 2

== Individual awards ==
- Most Valuable Player: Reggie Savage (Richelieu)
- Top Scorer: Reggie Savage (Richelieu)
- Top Forward: Jamie Steer (Calgary)
- Top Defenceman: Jason Herter (Notre Dame)
- Top Goaltender: Patrick Daigneault (Richelieu)
- Most Sportsmanlike Player: David McGahan (Gloucester)

== See also ==
- Telus Cup
