= 1988 Air Canada Cup =

Tournament details
- Venue: Fort William Gardens in Thunder Bay, ON
- Dates: April 1988
- Teams: 6

Final positions
- Champions: Regina Pat Canadians
- Runners-up: Calgary NorthStars
- Third place: Thunder Bay Bearcats

Awards
- MVP: Wes Walz

The 1988 Air Canada Cup was Canada's 10th annual national midget 'AAA' hockey championship, which was played in April 1988 at the Fort William Gardens in Thunder Bay, Ontario. The Regina Pat Canadians defeated the Calgary NorthStars to win their second national title. The host Thunder Bay Bearcats won the bronze medal. Calgary's Wes Walz was named Most Valuable Player. Other future National Hockey League players playing in this tournament were Greg Johnson, Rob Pearson, Chris Snell, Brent Thompson, and Dale Craigwell.

== Teams ==
Result	Team	Region	City
1st place, gold medalist(s)	Regina Pat Canadians	West	Regina, SK
2nd place, silver medalist(s)	Calgary NorthStars	Pacific	Calgary, AB
3rd place, bronze medalist(s)	Thunder Bay Bearcats	Host	Thunder Bay, ON
4	Oshawa Kiwanis	Central	Oshawa, ON
5	Fredericton Redwings	Atlantic	Fredericton, NB
6	Laval Laurentides-Lanaudiere	Quebec	Laval, QC

== Round robin ==
=== Standings ===
Pos	Team	Pld	W	L	D	GF	GA	GD	Pts
1	Calgary Northstars	5	4	1	0	26	14	+12	8
2	Regina Pat Canadians	5	3	1	1	27	17	+10	7
3	Thunder Bay Bearcats	5	3	2	0	18	15	+3	6
4	Oshawa Kiwanis	5	3	2	0	14	15	−1	6
5	Fredericton Redwings	5	1	4	0	10	24	−14	2
6	Laval Laurentides-Lanaudiere	5	0	4	1	18	28	−10	1

=== Scores ===
- Regina 5 - Thunder Bay 1
- Fredericton 4 - Laval Laurentides-Lanaudiere 3
- Oshawa 2 - Calgary 1
- Thunder Bay 4 - Fredericton 2
- Regina 6 - Laval Laurentides-Lanaudiere 6
- Thunder Bay 3 - Oshawa 1
- Calgary 8 - Laval Laurentides-Lanaudiere 5
- Regina 7 -Fredericton 2
- Calgary 6 - Thunder Bay 4
- Oshawa 4 - Laval Laurentides-Lanaudiere 3
- Calgary 6 - Regina 3
- Oshawa 5 - Fredericton 2
- Thunder Bay 6 - Laval Laurentides-Lanaudiere 1
- Regina 6 - Oshawa 2
- Calgary 5 - Fredericton 0

== Playoffs ==
=== Semi-finals ===
- Calgary 6 - Oshawa 4
- Regina 4 - Thunder Bay 3 (2OT)

=== Bronze-medal game ===
- Thunder Bay 5 - Oshawa 4

=== Gold-medal game ===
- Regina 7 - Calgary 4

== Individual awards ==
- Most Valuable Player: Wes Walz (Calgary)
- Most Sportsmanlike Player: Jason Bortolussi (Thunder Bay)

== See also ==
- Telus Cup
