= Collège Antoine-Girouard =

- Séminaire de Saint-Hyacinthe
- Seminarium S. Hyacinihi.

Location
- Saint-Hyacinthe, Quebec; Canada
- 45.633933°N 72.94304°W

Information
- School type: Private Secondary School
- Motto: Fides et scientia (Faith and Knowledge)
- Religious affiliation: Catholic
- Established: 1811; 215 years ago
- Principal: Dominique Lestage
- Enrollment: 800
- Sports: Hockey, Soccer, Golf
- Team name: Les Gaulois
- Website: antoinegirouard.com

Collège Antoine-Girouard is a private mixed-sex high school located in Saint-Hyacinthe, Quebec, Canada.

== History ==
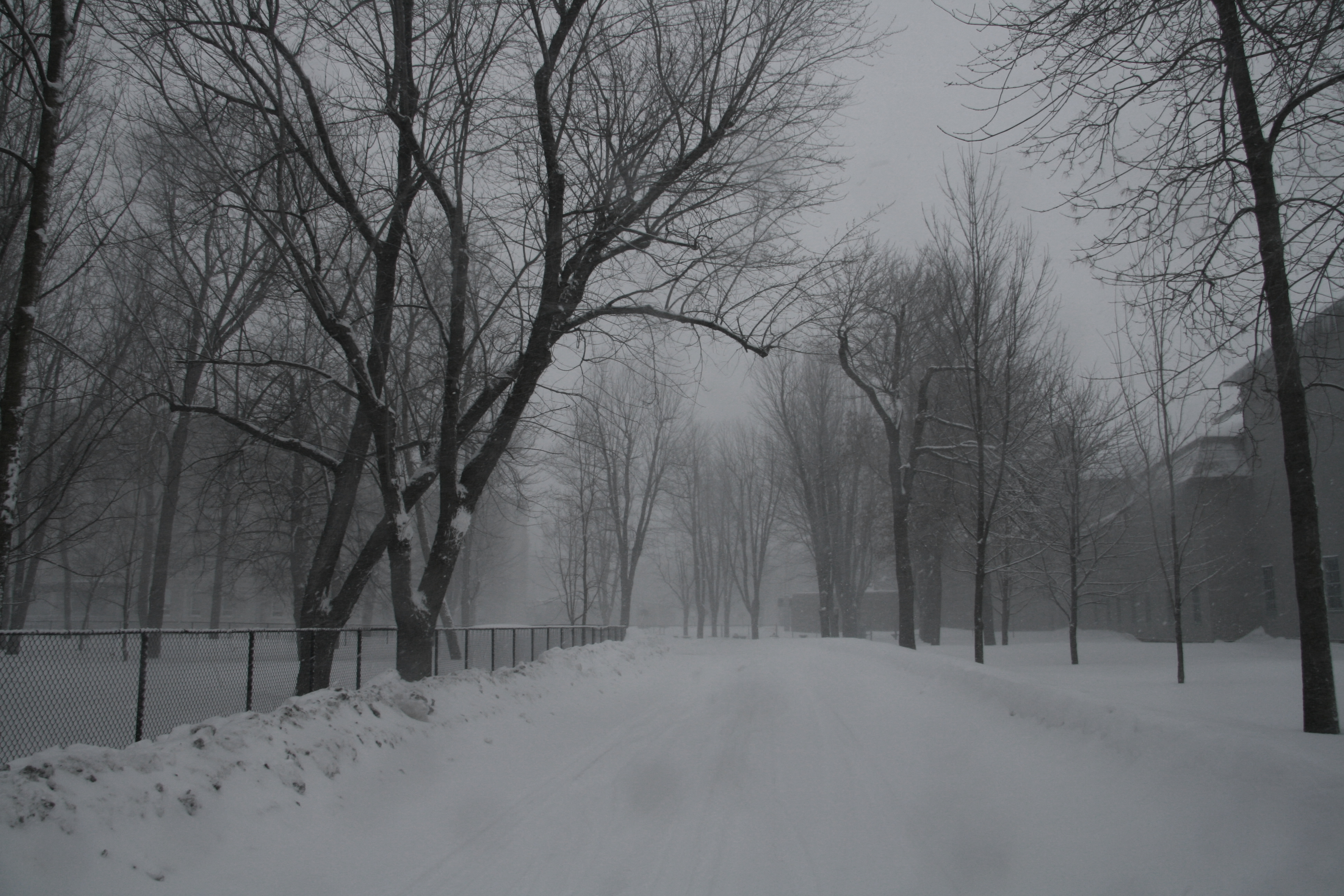
Saint-Hyacinthe seminary, winter 2008

It was founded in 1811 by Antoine Girouard.

- 1811: Séminaire de Saint-Hyacinthe
- 1970: École du Séminaire de Saint-Hyacinthe
- 1992: Collège Antoine-Girouard

The school's ice hockey team is the Collège Antoine-Girouard Gaulois, playing in the Quebec AAA Midget Hockey League. The team appeared in the 2003 Air Canada Cup, coached by Mario Pouliot.

== Notable alumni ==
- Paul Arcand (born 1960), journalist
- François Avard (born 1968), writer
- Pierre Corbeil (born 1955), politician and dentist
- Jean Cournoyer (born 1934), politician
- Bruno Gervais (born 1984), National Hockey League player
- David La Haye (born 1966), actor
- Charles Laberge (1827–1874), politician
- Kristopher Letang (born 1987), National Hockey League player
- Michael J. McGivney (1852–1890), founder of the Knights of Columbus
- Marc Messier (born 1947), actor
- Jean-Charles Prince (1804–1860), Bishop of Saint-Hyacinthe
- Maxime Talbot (born 1984), National Hockey League player
