= Nova Scotia U18 Major Hockey League =

Canadian major hockey league

- Current season, competition or edition: 2022–23 MHL season
- u18logo3d.jpg
- Sport: Ice hockey
- Founded: 1978
- President: Paul Graham
- No. of teams: 8
- Countries: Canada
- Headquarters: Halifax, Nova Scotia
- Continent: North America
- Broadcaster: High Button Sports
- Website: NSU18MHL Website

The Nova Scotia U18 Major Hockey League (NSU18MHL, formerly NSMMHL) is a Nova Scotian ice hockey league for Major AAA players under 18 years old. It is a part of and follows the regulations set by the Hockey Nova Scotia organisation. Successful players in this league often go on to play in the MHL and QMJHL.

== History ==
The league was founded and began playing in the 1978–79 season as the Maritime Midget Hockey League. During the first season there were seven teams in the league with four based in Nova Scotia and three based in New Brunswick. Since its founding the league has rebranded multiple times, first as the Nova Scotia AAA Midget Hockey League (NSAAAMHL) in 1983, then as the Nova Scotia Major Midget Hockey League (NSMMHL) in 2002, and finally as the Nova Scotia U18 Major Hockey League in 2019. It was founded to offer an opportunity for under 18 players from the Maritimes to compete at the highest possible level for their age group, with many associations spinning off their AAA teams to play in the broader Nova Scotia league.

== Teams ==
2025-26 Season
Team	Joined	Centre	Arena
Cape Breton West Islanders	-	Cape Breton, Nova Scotia	Al MacInnis Sports Centre
Halifax Macs	1978	Halifax, Nova Scotia	Halifax Forum
South Shore Mustangs	1985	Bridgewater, Nova Scotia	Lunenburg County Lifestyle Centre
Sydney Rush	-	Sydney, Nova Scotia	Membertou
Dartmouth Steele Subarus	2011	Dartmouth, Nova Scotia	Dartmouth Sportsplex
Weeks Major U18 Majors	1986	Pictou County, Nova Scotia	Pictou County Wellness Centre
Valley Wildcats (U18)	-	Berwick, Nova Scotia	Kings Mutual Century Center
March & Mill Co. Hunters Hockey	-	Cole Harbour, Nova Scotia	Cole Harbour Place

== League champions ==
During the regular season the league tracks the teams with the most wins who then go on to compete in the league finals for the champion title.

For the 2019–20 and 2020–21 seasons no league champion was crowned due to the finals being cancelled by COVID-19 pandemic related lock-downs.

Season	Season Champions	Provincial Champions
2024–25	Halifax Macs	Halifax Macs
2023–24	Halifax Macs	Halifax Macs	2022–23	Weeks U18 Majors	Weeks U18 Majors
2021–22	Halifax Macs	Halifax Macs
2020–21	Halifax Macs	Playoffs Cancelled due to Covid-19
2019–20	South Shore Mustangs	Playoffs Cancelled due to Covid-19
2018–19	Cole Harbour	Halifax Macs
2017–18	Halifax Macs	Steele Subaru
2016–17	Cape Breton West Islanders	Cape Breton West Islanders
2015–16	Cole Harbour	Steele Subaru
2014–15	Halifax Macs	Newbridge Academy
2013–14	Halifax Macs	Halifax Macs
2012–13	Valley Wildcats	Valley Wildcats
2011-12	Halifax Titans	Halifax Titans
2010-11	Dartmouth Ice Dawgs	Halifax Titans
2009-10	Halifax Titans	Cole Harbour McCains
2008-09	Cole Harbour McCains	Cole Harbour McCains
2007-08	Dartmouth Subways	Cole Harbour McCains
2006-07	Pictou County Weeks	Dartmouth Subways

== Notable players ==
- Morgan Barron
- Shane Bowers
- Sidney Crosby
- Ryan Graves
- Nathan MacKinnon
- Brad Marchand
- Glen Murray
- Logan Shaw
- James Sheppard
