= Alliance Hockey =

Minor ice hockey organization in Canada

Alliance Emblem

Alliance Hockey, stylized as ALLIANCE Hockey, is a minor level ice hockey organization based in Southern Ontario. Founded in 1993, the league is jointly sanctioned by the Ontario Hockey Federation (OHF) and Hockey Canada.

== Member organizations ==
=== "AAA" ===
- Brantford 99'ers
- Cambridge Hawks
- Chatham-Kent Cyclones
- Elgin Middlesex Canucks
- Huron Perth Lakers
- Kitchener Jr. Rangers
- Sarnia-Lambton Jr. Sting
- London Jr. Knights
- Sun County Panthers
- Waterloo Wolves
- Windsor Jr. Spitfires

=== "AA/A" ===
- Brantford 99'ers
- Burlington Jr. Raiders
- Cambridge Hawks
- Hamilton Huskies
- Kitchener Jr. Rangers
- London Jr. Knights Green
- London Jr. Knights White
- GLHA Jr. Mustangs White
- GLHA Jr. Mustangs Purple
- Sarnia Jr. Sting
- Stratford Warriors
- Waterloo Wolves
- Woodstock Jr. Navy-Vets

=== East/Central Development ===
- Brantford 99ers
- Burlington Bulldogs
- Cambridge Hawks
- Hamilton Huskies
- Kitchener Jr. Rangers
- Woodstock Jr Navy-Vets
- Waterloo Wolves

=== West Development ===
- London Bandits
- North London Nationals
- Oakridge Aeros
- Sarnia Jr. Sting
- Stratford Warriors
- West London Hawks
