= Hockey Nova Scotia =

Canadian ice hockey governing body

- Sport: Ice hockey
- Jurisdiction: Nova Scotia
- Founded: 1974
- Headquarters: Halifax

Official website
- hockeynovascotia.ca
- (Canada)
- (Nova Scotia)

Hockey Nova Scotia is the governing body of all ice hockey in Nova Scotia, Canada. Hockey Nova Scotia is a branch of Hockey Canada.

== History ==
The Maritime Amateur Hockey Association (MAHA) was granted a branch membership within the Canadian Amateur Hockey Association (CAHA) in 1928, with its jurisdiction including the Maritimes provinces of New Brunswick, Nova Scotia and Prince Edward Island.

The New Brunswick Amateur Hockey Association separated from the MAHA and became its own branch of the CAHA in 1968. The MAHA ceased to exist when the Nova Scotia Hockey Association was granted branch status in the CAHA in 1974, and then the Prince Edward Island Hockey Association was formed and also granted branch status in the CAHA.

== Leagues ==
- Maritime Junior A Hockey League (Tier II Junior "A")
- Nova Scotia Junior Hockey League (Junior "B")
- Nova Scotia Junior C Hockey League (Junior "C")

== Notable executives ==
- Hanson Dowell – treasurer of the Nova Scotia Hockey Association from 1974 to 1986, and a past president of the Canadian Amateur Hockey Association

== See also ==
- List of ice hockey teams in Nova Scotia
