= Hockey New Brunswick =

Canadian ice hockey governing body

- Sport: Ice hockey
- Jurisdiction: New Brunswick
- Founded: 1968

Official website
- hnb.ca
- (Canada)
- (New Brunswick)

Hockey New Brunswick (HNB) is the governing body of all ice hockey in New Brunswick, Canada. Hockey New Brunswick is a branch of Hockey Canada.

== History ==
The Maritime Amateur Hockey Association (MAHA) was granted a branch membership within the Canadian Amateur Hockey Association (CAHA) in 1928, with its jurisdiction including the Maritimes provinces of New Brunswick, Nova Scotia and Prince Edward Island.

New Brunswick first attempted to become a separate branch of the CAHA in 1953. A second attempt was made in 1967, and after a trial run of one year as its own association, the New Brunswick Amateur Hockey Association separated from the MAHA and became its own branch of the CAHA in 1968.

== Notable leagues ==
- Maritime Junior A Hockey League (Tier II Junior "A")
- New Brunswick Junior B Hockey League (Junior "B")
- New Brunswick-Prince Edward Island Major Midget Hockey League (Major-Minor)

== See also ==
- List of ice hockey teams in New Brunswick
