= 2013–14 Toronto Maple Leafs season =

NHL franchise season

2013–14 Toronto Maple Leafs
- Division: 6th Atlantic
- Conference: 12th Eastern
- 2013–14 record: 38–36–8
- Home record: 24–16–1
- Road record: 14–20–7
- Goals for: 231
- Goals against: 256

Team information
- General manager: Dave Nonis
- Coach: Randy Carlyle
- Captain: Dion Phaneuf
- Alternate captains: Carl Gunnarsson (Nov.–Apr.); Joffrey Lupul; Jay McClement
- Arena: Air Canada Centre
- Average attendance: 19,439 (105.6%) (39 games)
- Minor league affiliates: Toronto Marlies (AHL); Orlando Solar Bears (ECHL)

Team leaders
- Goals: Phil Kessel (37)
- Assists: Phil Kessel (43)
- Points: Phil Kessel (80)
- Penalty minutes: Dion Phaneuf (137)
- Plus/minus: Carl Gunnarsson (+12)
- Wins: Jonathan Bernier (26)
- Goals against average: Jonathan Bernier (2.69)

The 2013–14 Toronto Maple Leafs season was the 97th season for the National Hockey League (NHL) franchise that was established on November 22, 1917. Due to a realignment that was approved on March 14, 2013, by the NHL's Board of Governors, the Maple Leafs played this season in the eight-team Atlantic Division of the Eastern Conference. For the first time since the 1997–98 season, they played every team in the league at least once both home and away. In fact, they played the Montreal Canadiens and the Buffalo Sabres five times each, every other team in their own division four times each, teams in the Metropolitan Division of the Eastern Conference three times each, and every team from the Western Conference twice.

The Maple Leafs played in the NHL Winter Classic against the Detroit Red Wings on January 1, 2014, at Michigan Stadium, the home of the University of Michigan football team. The Leafs won 3–2.

The Leafs were in a playoff position for much of the season, but a 2–12 record in the final 14 games of the season caused them to miss the playoffs for the first time since the 2011–12 season.

== Standings ==
Atlantic Division
Pos	Team	GP	W	L	OTL	ROW	GF	GA	GD	Pts
1	p – Boston Bruins	82	54	19	9	51	261	177	+84	117
2	x – Tampa Bay Lightning	82	46	27	9	38	240	215	+25	101
3	x – Montreal Canadiens	82	46	28	8	40	215	204	+11	100
4	x – Detroit Red Wings	82	39	28	15	34	222	230	−8	93
5	Ottawa Senators	82	37	31	14	30	236	265	−29	88
6	Toronto Maple Leafs	82	38	36	8	29	231	256	−25	84
7	Florida Panthers	82	29	45	8	21	196	268	−72	66
8	Buffalo Sabres	82	21	51	10	14	157	248	−91	52

Source: National Hockey League
p – Clinched Presidents' Trophy; x – Clinched playoff spot

Eastern Conference Wild Card
Pos	Div	Team	GP	W	L	OTL	ROW	GF	GA	GD	Pts
1	ME	x – Columbus Blue Jackets	82	43	32	7	38	231	216	+15	93
2	AT	x – Detroit Red Wings	82	39	28	15	34	222	230	−8	93
3	ME	Washington Capitals	82	38	30	14	28	235	240	−5	90
4	ME	New Jersey Devils	82	35	29	18	35	197	208	−11	88
5	AT	Ottawa Senators	82	37	31	14	30	236	265	−29	88
6	AT	Toronto Maple Leafs	82	38	36	8	29	231	256	−25	84
7	ME	Carolina Hurricanes	82	36	35	11	34	207	230	−23	83
8	ME	New York Islanders	82	34	37	11	25	225	267	−42	79
9	AT	Florida Panthers	82	29	45	8	21	196	268	−72	66
10	AT	Buffalo Sabres	82	21	51	10	14	157	248	−91	52

Source: National Hockey League
x – Clinched playoff spot

== Schedule and results ==
=== Pre-season ===
2013 Pre-Season: 5–2–1 (home: 2–1–1; road: 3–1–0)

Game	September	Opponent	Score	Location (Attendance)	Record	Decision
1	15	@ Philadelphia Flyers	4–3	Budweiser Gardens	1–0–0	Gibson (1–0–0)
2	16	Philadelphia Flyers	2–3 (SO)	Air Canada Centre	1–0–1	MacIntyre (0–0–1)
3	19	@ Ottawa Senators	3–2	Canadian Tire Centre	2–0–1	MacIntyre (1–0–1)
4	21	@ Buffalo Sabres	3–2 (SO)	First Niagara Center	3–0–1	Reimer (1–0–0)
5	22	Buffalo Sabres	5–3	Air Canada Centre	4–0–1	Bernier (1–0–0)
6	24	Ottawa Senators	2–3	Air Canada Centre	4–1–1	Reimer (1–1–0)
7	27	@ Detroit Red Wings	2–5	Joe Louis Arena	4–2–1	Bernier (1–1–0)
8	28	Detroit Red Wings	3–1	Air Canada Centre	5–2–1	Reimer (2–1–0)

=== Regular season ===
2013–14 Game Log: 38–36–8, 84 Points (home: 24–16–1; road: 14–20–7)
October: 10–4–0, 20 Points (home: 5–2–0; road: 5–2–0)

Game	October	Opponent	Score	Location (Attendance)	Record	Points	Decision	Recap
1	1	@ Montreal Canadiens	4–3	Bell Centre (21,273)	1–0–0	2	Reimer (1–0–0)	
2	2	@ Philadelphia Flyers	3–1	Wells Fargo Center (19,872)	2–0–0	4	Bernier (1–0–0)	
3	5	Ottawa Senators	5–4 (SO)	Air Canada Centre (19,552)	3–0–0	6	Bernier (2–0–0)	
4	8	Colorado Avalanche	1–2	Air Canada Centre (19,388)	3–1–0	6	Bernier (2–1–0)	
5	10	@ Nashville Predators	4–0	Bridgestone Arena (16,671)	4–1–0	8	Bernier (3–1–0)	
6	12	Edmonton Oilers	6–5 (OT)	Air Canada Centre (19,379)	5–1–0	10	Bernier (4–1–0)	
7	15	Minnesota Wild	4–1	Air Canada Centre (19,283)	6–1–0	12	Reimer (2–0–0)	
8	17	Carolina Hurricanes	2–3	Air Canada Centre (19,277)	6–2–0	12	Bernier (4–2–0)	
9	19	@ Chicago Blackhawks	1–3	United Center (21,801)	6–3–0	12	Bernier (4–3–0)	
10	22	Anaheim Ducks	4–2	Air Canada Centre (19,408)	7–3–0	14	Bernier (5–3–0)	
11	25	@ Columbus Blue Jackets	2–5	Nationwide Arena (13,930)	7–4–0	14	Bernier (5–4–0)	
12	26	Pittsburgh Penguins	4–1	Air Canada Centre (19,539)	8–4–0	16	Reimer (3–0–0)	
13	29	@ Edmonton Oilers	4–0	Rexall Place (16,839)	9–4–0	18	Reimer (4–0–0)	
14	30	@ Calgary Flames	4–2	Scotiabank Saddledome (19,289)	10–4–0	20	Bernier (6–4–0)	

November: 4–6–3, 11 Points (home: 4–2–0; road: 0–4–3)

Game	November	Opponent	Score	Location/Attendance	Record	Points	Decision	Recap
15	2	@ Vancouver Canucks	0–4	Rogers Arena (18,910)	10–5–0	20	Reimer (4–1–0)	
16	8	New Jersey Devils	2–1 (SO)	Air Canada Centre (19,377)	11–5–0	22	Bernier (7–4–0)	
17	9	@ Boston Bruins	1–3	TD Garden (17,565)	11–6–0	22	Reimer (4–2–0)	
18	13	@ Minnesota Wild	1–2 (SO)	Xcel Energy Center (17,897)	11–6–1	23	Bernier (7–4–1)	
19	15	@ Buffalo Sabres	1–3	First Niagara Center (19,070)	11–7–1	23	Bernier (7–5–1)	
20	16	Buffalo Sabres	4–2	Air Canada Centre (19,447)	12–7–1	25	Reimer (5–2–0)	
21	19	New York Islanders	5–2	Air Canada Centre (19,446)	13–7–1	27	Bernier (8–5–1)	
22	21	Nashville Predators	2–4	Air Canada Centre (19,256)	13–8–1	27	Bernier (8–6–1)	
23	23	Washington Capitals	2–1 (SO)	Air Canada Centre (19,473)	14–8–1	29	Reimer (6–2–0)	
24	25	Columbus Blue Jackets	0–6	Air Canada Centre (19,241)	14–9–1	29	Reimer (6–3–0)	
25	27	@ Pittsburgh Penguins	5–6 (SO)	Consol Energy Center (18,660)	14–9–2	30	Bernier (8–6–2)	
26	29	@ Buffalo Sabres	2–3 (OT)	First Niagara Center (19,070)	14–9–3	31	Reimer (6–3–1)	
27	30	@ Montreal Canadiens	2–4	Bell Centre (21,273)	14–10–3	31	Bernier (8–7–2)	

December: 6–6–2, 14 Points (home: 5–4–1; road: 1–2–1)

Game	December	Opponent	Score	Location/Attendance	Record	Points	Decision	Recap
28	3	San Jose Sharks	2–4	Air Canada Centre (19,360)	14–11–3	31	Reimer (6–4–1)	
29	5	Dallas Stars	3–2 (OT)	Air Canada Centre (19,164)	15–11–3	33	Bernier (9–7–2)	
30	7	@ Ottawa Senators	4–3 (SO)	Canadian Tire Centre (19,559)	16–11–3	35	Reimer (7–4–1)	
31	8	Boston Bruins	2–5	Air Canada Centre (19,165)	16–12–3	35	Bernier (9–8–2)	
32	11	Los Angeles Kings	1–3	Air Canada Centre (19,375)	16–13–3	35	Bernier (9–9–2)	
33	12	@ St. Louis Blues	3–6	Scottrade Center (16,073)	16–14–3	35	Bernier (9–10–2)	
34	14	Chicago Blackhawks	7–3	Air Canada Centre (19,603)	17–14–3	37	Bernier (10–10–2)	
35	16	@ Pittsburgh Penguins	1–3	Consol Energy Center (18,573)	17–15–3	37	Bernier (10–11–2)	
36	17	Florida Panthers	1–3	Air Canada Centre (19,076)	17–16–3	37	Reimer (7–5–1)	
37	19	Phoenix Coyotes	2–1 (SO)	Air Canada Centre (19,254)	18–16–3	39	Reimer (8–5–1)	
38	21	Detroit Red Wings	4–5 (SO)	Air Canada Centre (19,508)	18–16–4	40	Bernier (10–11–3)	
39	23	@ New York Rangers	1–2 (SO)	Madison Square Garden (18,006)	18–16–5	41	Bernier (10–11–4)	
40	27	Buffalo Sabres	4–3 (SO)	Air Canada Centre (19,405)	19–16–5	43	Bernier (11–11–4)	
41	29	Carolina Hurricanes	5–2	Air Canada Centre (19,452)	20–16–5	45	Bernier (12–11–4)	

January: 9–5–1, 19 Points (home: 5–2–0; road: 4–3–1)

Game	January	Opponent	Score	Location/Attendance	Record	Points	Decision	Recap
42	1	@ Detroit Red Wings	3–2 (SO)	Michigan Stadium (105,491)	21–16–5	47	Bernier (13–11–4)	
43	4	New York Rangers	1–7	Air Canada Centre (19,362)	21–17–5	47	Bernier (13–12–4)	
44	7	New York Islanders	3–5	Air Canada Centre (19,164)	21–18–5	47	Bernier (13–13–4)	
45	9	@ Carolina Hurricanes	1–6	PNC Arena (16,583)	21–19–5	47	Reimer (8–6–1)	
46	10	@ Washington Capitals	2–3	Verizon Center (18,506)	21–20–5	47	Bernier (13–14–4)	
47	12	New Jersey Devils	3–2 (SO)	Air Canada Centre (19,175)	22–20–5	49	Bernier (14–14–4)	
48	14	@ Boston Bruins	4–3	TD Garden (17,565)	23–20–5	51	Bernier (15–14–4)	
49	15	Buffalo Sabres	4–3 (SO)	Air Canada Centre (19,372)	24–20–5	53	Reimer (9–6–1)	
50	18	Montreal Canadiens	5–3	Air Canada Centre (19,667)	25–20–5	55	Bernier (16–14–4)	
51	20	@ Phoenix Coyotes	4–2	Jobing.com Arena (14,476)	26–20–5	57	Bernier (17–14–4)	
52	21	@ Colorado Avalanche	5–2	Pepsi Center (14,877)	27–20–5	59	Reimer (10–6–1)	
53	23	@ Dallas Stars	1–7	American Airlines Center (13,678)	27–21–5	59	Bernier (17–15–4)	
54	25	@ Winnipeg Jets	4–5 (OT)	MTS Centre (15,004)	27–21–6	60	Bernier (17–15–5)	
55	28	Tampa Bay Lightning	3–2	Air Canada Centre (19,475)	28–21–6	62	Bernier (18–15–5)	
56	30	Florida Panthers	6–3	Air Canada Centre (19,448)	29–21–6	64	Bernier (19–15–5)	

February: 3–1–1, 7 Points (home: 2–0–0; road: 1–1–1)

Game	February	Opponent	Score	Location/Attendance	Record	Points	Decision	Recap
57	1	Ottawa Senators	6–3	Air Canada Centre (19,613)	30–21–6	66	Bernier (20–15–5)	
58	4	@ Florida Panthers	1–4	BB&T Center (15,583)	30–22–6	66	Bernier (20–16–5)	
59	6	@ Tampa Bay Lightning	4–1	Tampa Bay Times Forum (19,204)	31–22–6	68	Bernier (21–16–5)	
60	8	Vancouver Canucks	3–1	Air Canada Centre (19,662)	32–22–6	70	Bernier (22–16–5)	
61	27	@ New York Islanders	4–5 (OT)	Nassau Veterans Memorial Coliseum (13,922)	32–22–7	71	Bernier (22–16–6)	

March: 4–10–1, 9 Points (home: 1–5–0; road: 3–5–1)

Game	March	Opponent	Score	Location/Attendance	Record	Points	Decision	Recap
62	1	@ Montreal Canadiens	3–4 (OT)	Bell Centre (21,273)	32–22–8	72	Bernier (22–16–7)	
63	3	Columbus Blue Jackets	1–2	Air Canada Centre (19,577)	32–23–8	72	Reimer (10–7–1)	
64	5	@ New York Rangers	3–2 (OT)	Madison Square Garden (18,006)	33–23–8	74	Bernier (23–16–7)	
65	8	Philadelphia Flyers	4–3 (OT)	Air Canada Centre (19,583)	34–23–8	76	Bernier (24–16–7)	
66	10	@ Anaheim Ducks	3–1	Honda Center (17,229)	35–23–8	78	Bernier (25–16–7)	
67	11	@ San Jose Sharks	2–6	SAP Center at San Jose (17,562)	35–24–8	78	Reimer (10–8–1)	
68	13	@ Los Angeles Kings	3–2	Staples Center (18,319)	36–24–8	80	Reimer (11–8–1)	
69	16	@ Washington Capitals	2–4	Verizon Center (18,506)	36–25–8	80	Reimer (11–9–1)	
70	18	@ Detroit Red Wings	2–3	Joe Louis Arena (20,066)	36–26–8	80	Reimer (11–10–1)	
71	19	Tampa Bay Lightning	3–5	Air Canada Centre (19,585)	36–27–8	80	Reimer (11–11–1)	
72	22	Montreal Canadiens	3–4	Air Canada Centre (19,789)	36–28–8	80	Reimer (11–12–1)	
73	23	@ New Jersey Devils	2–3	Prudential Center (15,328)	36–29–8	80	Reimer (11–13–1)	
74	25	St. Louis Blues	3–5	Air Canada Centre (19,505)	36–30–8	80	Bernier (25–17–7)	
75	28	@ Philadelphia Flyers	2–4	Wells Fargo Center (19,963)	36–31–8	80	Bernier (25–18–7)	
76	29	Detroit Red Wings	2–4	Air Canada Centre (20,270)	36–32–8	80	Bernier (25–19–7)	

April: 2–4–0, 4 Points (home: 2–1–0; road: 0–3–0)

Game	April	Opponent	Score	Location/Attendance	Record	Points	Decision	Recap
77	1	Calgary Flames	3–2	Air Canada Centre (19,482)	37–32–8	82	Bernier (26–19–7)	
78	3	Boston Bruins	4–3 (OT)	Air Canada Centre (19,609)	38–32–8	84	Reimer (12–13–1)	
79	5	Winnipeg Jets	2–4	Air Canada Centre (19,544)	38–33–8	84	Reimer (12–14–1)	
80	8	@ Tampa Bay Lightning	0–3	Tampa Bay Times Forum (18,896)	38–34–8	84	Reimer (12–15–1)	
81	10	@ Florida Panthers	2–4	BB&T Center (13,110)	38–35–8	84	MacIntyre (0–1–0)	
82	12	@ Ottawa Senators	0–1	Canadian Tire Centre (20,500)	38–36–8	84	Reimer (12–16–1)	

== Player statistics ==
Final stats

=== Skaters ===
Regular season
Player	GP	G	A	Pts	+/−	PIM
Phil Kessel	82	37	43	80	−5	27
James van Riemsdyk	80	30	31	61	−9	50
Nazem Kadri	78	20	30	50	−11	67
Tyler Bozak	58	19	30	49	2	14
Mason Raymond	82	19	26	45	−6	22
Joffrey Lupul	69	22	22	44	−15	44
Cody Franson	79	5	28	33	−20	30
Jake Gardiner	80	10	21	31	−3	19
Dion Phaneuf	80	8	23	31	2	144
Morgan Rielly	73	2	25	27	−13	12
Nikolai Kulemin	70	9	11	20	−4	24
Carl Gunnarsson	80	3	14	17	12	34
Paul Ranger	53	6	8	14	−1	36
Dave Bolland	23	8	4	12	−1	24
David Clarkson	60	5	6	11	−14	93
Peter Holland^{†}	39	5	5	10	1	16
Jay McClement	81	4	6	10	−8	32
Troy Bodie	47	3	7	10	6	26
Trevor Smith	28	4	5	9	−3	4
Tim Gleason^{†}	39	1	4	5	−14	55
Jerry D'Amigo	22	1	2	3	−1	0
Carter Ashton	32	0	3	3	1	19
Josh Leivo	7	1	1	2	0	0
David Broll	5	0	1	1	1	5
Mark Fraser^{‡}	19	0	1	1	−8	33
Jerred Smithson	18	0	0	0	−5	9
Colton Orr	54	0	0	0	−3	110
Frazer McLaren	27	0	0	0	−2	77
Jamie Devane	2	0	0	0	−1	0
Greg McKegg	1	0	0	0	0	0
Petter Granberg	1	0	0	0	0	0
Spencer Abbott	1	0	0	0	−2	0
John-Michael Liles^{‡}	6	0	0	0	−2	0

=== Goaltenders ===
Regular season
Player	GP	GS	TOI	W	L	OT	GA	GAA	SA	SV%	SO	G	A	PIM
Jonathan Bernier	55	49	3,083:34	26	19	7	138	2.68	1,787	.923	1	0	1	4
James Reimer	36	32	1,784:39	12	16	1	98	3.29	1,095	.911	1	0	0	2
Drew MacIntyre	2	1	94:35	0	1	0	4	2.53	51	.922	0	0	0	0

^{†}Denotes player spent time with another team before joining the Maple Leafs. Stats reflect time with the Maple Leafs only.
^{‡}Denotes player was traded mid-season. Stats reflect time with the Maple Leafs only.
Bold/italics denotes franchise record.

== Awards and records ==
=== Awards ===
Regular Season
Player	Award	Reached
Phil Kessel	NHL Second Star of the Week	October 28, 2013
Phil Kessel	NHL Second Star of the Month	January, 2014
Phil Kessel	NHL Second Star of the Week	February 3, 2014

=== Milestones ===
Updated as of February 9, 2014

Regular Season
Player	Milestone	Reached
Dion Phaneuf	600th Career NHL Game	October 1, 2013
Nazem Kadri	100th Career NHL Game	October 1, 2013
Mason Raymond	100th Career NHL Assist	October 5, 2013
Spencer Abbott	1st Career NHL Game	October 5, 2013
Jamie Devane	1st Career NHL Game	October 5, 2013
Morgan Rielly	1st Career NHL Game	October 5, 2013
Carter Ashton	1st Career NHL Assist; 1st Career NHL Point	October 8, 2013
David Broll	1st Career NHL Game	October 10, 2013
Josh Leivo	1st Career NHL Game	October 10, 2013
Morgan Rielly	1st Career NHL Assist; 1st Career NHL Point	October 10, 2013
David Broll	1st Career NHL Assist; 1st Career NHL Point	October 12, 2013
Phil Kessel	200th Career NHL Assist	October 15, 2013
Dave Bolland	100th Career NHL Assist	October 15, 2013
Josh Leivo	1st Career NHL Goal; 1st Career NHL Point	October 17, 2013
Josh Leivo	1st Career NHL Assist	October 22, 2013
Jake Gardiner	100th Career NHL Game	October 29, 2013
Phil Kessel	400th Career NHL Point	November 19, 2013
Mason Raymond	400th Career NHL Game	November 29, 2013
Jerred Smithson	600th Career NHL Game	November 30, 2013
Phil Kessel	200th Career NHL Goal	December 3, 2013
Jerry D'Amigo	1st Career NHL Game	December 5, 2013
Paul Ranger	300th Career NHL Game	December 12, 2013
Mason Raymond	200th Career NHL Point	December 14, 2013
Jerry D'Amigo	1st Career NHL Goal; 1st Career NHL Point; 1st Career NHL Assist	December 14, 2013
Morgan Rielly	1st Career NHL Goal	December 16, 2013
David Clarkson	100th Career NHL Goal	December 21, 2013
Paul Ranger	100th Career NHL Point	December 29, 2013
Jay McClement	200th Career NHL Point	January 21, 2014
Jonathan Bernier	100th Career NHL Game	January 25, 2014
Nazem Kadri	100th Career NHL Point	January 30, 2014
Tyler Bozak	100th Career NHL Assist	February 8, 2014

== Transactions ==
The Maple Leafs have been involved in the following transactions during the 2013–14 season.

=== Trades ===
Date	Details
June 30, 2013	To Chicago Blackhawks 2nd round pick in 2013 – Carl Dahlstrom; 4th round pick in 2013 (Note: Pick subsequently traded to San Jose Sharks.) – Fredrik Bergvik; 4th round pick in 2014 – Fredrik Olofsson	To Toronto Maple Leafs Dave Bolland
September 29, 2013	To Calgary Flames Joe Colborne	To Toronto Maple Leafs Conditional 4th-round pick in 2014 (Note: Condition satisfied; pick subsequently traded to St. Louis Blues.) – Ville Husso
November 16, 2013	To Anaheim Ducks Jesse Blacker; Conditional 3rd-round pick in 2014 (Note: Pick converted to a 2nd-round pick after condition satisfied.) – Marcus Pettersson; 7th-round pick in 2014 – Ondrej Kase	To Toronto Maple Leafs Peter Holland; Brad Staubitz
January 1, 2014	To Carolina Hurricanes John-Michael Liles; Dennis Robertson	To Toronto Maple Leafs Tim Gleason
January 22, 2014	To Los Angeles Kings Andrew Crescenzi	To Toronto Maple Leafs Brandon Kozun
January 31, 2014	To Edmonton Oilers Mark Fraser	To Toronto Maple Leafs Cameron Abney; Teemu Hartikainen

=== Free agents acquired ===
Player	Former team	Contract terms
David Clarkson	New Jersey Devils	7 years, $36.75 million
Trevor Smith	Pittsburgh Penguins	1 year, $550,000
T. J. Brennan	Nashville Predators	1 year, $600,000
Troy Bodie	Portland Pirates	1 year, $600,000
Paul Ranger	Toronto Marlies	1 year, $1 million
Spencer Abbott	Toronto Marlies	1 year, $650,000
Mason Raymond	Vancouver Canucks	1 year, $1 million
Jerred Smithson	Toronto Marlies	1 year, $550,000

=== Free agents lost ===
Player	New team	Contract terms
Mike Komisarek	Carolina Hurricanes	1 year, $700,000
Clarke MacArthur	Ottawa Senators	2 years, $6.5 million
Ryan Hamilton	Edmonton Oilers	2 years, $1.2 million
Mike Kostka	Chicago Blackhawks	1 year, $625,000
Mikhail Grabovski	Washington Capitals	1 year, $3 million
Ryan O'Byrne	Lev Prague	2 years

=== Player signings ===
Player	Date	Contract terms
Tyler Bozak	July 5, 2013	5 years, $21 million
Frazer McLaren	July 5, 2013	2 years, $1.4 million
Kevin Marshall	July 5, 2013	2 years, $1.125 million
Jonathan Bernier	July 5, 2013	2 years, $5.8 million
Joe Colborne	July 10, 2013	1 year, $600,000
Carl Gunnarsson	July 22, 2013	3 years, $9.45 million
Mark Fraser	July 30, 2013	1 year, $1.275 million
Nazem Kadri	September 10, 2013	2 years, $5.8 million
Cody Franson	September 26, 2013	1 year, $2 million
Phil Kessel	October 1, 2013	8 years, $64 million contract extension
Matt Finn	November 19, 2013	3 years, $2.575 million entry-level contract
Connor Brown	November 22, 2013	3 years, $2.1525 million entry-level contract
Frederik Gauthier	November 27, 2013	3 years, $2.775 million entry-level contract
Dion Phaneuf	December 31, 2013	7 years, $49 million contract extension
Eric Knodel	March 25, 2014	1 year, $690,000 entry-level contract
Carter Verhaeghe	April 2, 2014	3 years, $2.4275 million entry-level contract
Ryan Rupert	April 10, 2014	3 years, $1.895 million entry-level contract
Viktor Loov	April 16, 2014	3 years, $2.0775 million entry-level contract
Antoine Bibeau	June 3, 2014	3 years, entry-level contract
Brandon Kozun	June 20, 2014	1 year, $550,000

== Draft picks ==
Toronto Maple Leafs' picks at the 2013 NHL entry draft, held in Newark, New Jersey on June 30, 2013.

Round	#	Player	Pos	Nationality	College/Junior/Club team (League)
1	21	Frederik Gauthier	C	Canada	Rimouski Océanic (QMJHL)
3	82	Carter Verhaeghe	C	Canada	Niagara IceDogs (OHL)
5	142	Fabrice Herzog	RW	Switzerland	EV Zug (NLA)
6	172	Antoine Bibeau	G	Canada	P.E.I. Rocket (QMJHL)
7	202	Andreas Johnsson	LW	Sweden	Frölunda HC (SHL)

=== Draft notes ===
- The Toronto Maple Leafs' second-round pick went to the Chicago Blackhawks as the result of a trade on June 30, 2013, that sent Dave Bolland to Toronto in exchange for Anaheim's fourth-round pick in 2013 (117th overall), Edmonton's fourth-round pick in 2014 and this pick.
- The Toronto Maple Leafs' fourth-round pick went to the St. Louis Blues as the result of a trade on June 30, 2013, that sent a seventh-round pick in 2013 (203rd overall) and a fourth-round pick in 2014 to Nashville in exchange for this pick. The Nashville Predators had previously acquired this pick as the result of a July 3, 2011 trade that sent Matthew Lombardi and Cody Franson to the Maple Leafs in exchange for Brett Lebda, Robert Slaney and this pick.
- The Anaheim Ducks' fourth-round pick went to the San Jose Sharks as the result of a trade on June 30, 2013, that sent a fourth-round pick in 2013 (111th overall) and a fifth-round pick in 2014 to Chicago in exchange for a fifth-round pick in 2013 (151st overall) and this pick. Chicago previously acquired this pick as the result of a trade on June 30, 2013, that sent Dave Bolland to Toronto in exchange for a second-round pick in 2013 (51st overall), Edmonton's fourth-round pick in 2014 and this pick. The Toronto Maple Leafs had previously acquired this pick as a result of a February 9, 2011, trade that sent Francois Beauchemin to the Ducks in exchange for Joffrey Lupul, Jake Gardiner and this pick.
