= Saskatchewan Male U18 AAA Hockey League =

Canadian ice hockey league

- Formerly: Saskatchewan Midget 'AAA' Hockey League
- Sport: Ice hockey
- No. of teams: 12
- Related competitions: Telus Cup
- Website: smaaahl.com/

The Saskatchewan Male U18 'AAA' Hockey League (SMAAAHL), formerly the Saskatchewan Midget AAA Hockey League,) is a U-18 'AAA' ice hockey league, with teams based in the province of Saskatchewan, Canada. It is the highest level of minor hockey in the province. Players in this league are 18 years of age or younger and often move on to play major junior hockey in the Western Hockey League or junior 'A' hockey in the Saskatchewan Junior Hockey League followed by college hockey in the United States. Several have eventually gone on to professional hockey careers in the National Hockey League or in Europe.

Each year's playoff champion advances to the regional U-18 'AAA' championship, the winner of which earns a spot in the Telus Cup national championship. Saskatchewan teams have won a combined 14 national titles since 1979. The Notre Dame Hounds won the 2018 Telus Cup becoming the first 5-time Champion.

== Teams ==
Team	City	Arena	National Titles
Battlefords Stars	North Battleford	North Battleford Civic Centre	0
Estevan Bears	Estevan	Affinity Place	0
Moose Jaw AAA Warriors	Moose Jaw	Mosaic Place	0
Notre Dame Hounds	Wilcox	Duncan McNeill Arena	5
Prince Albert Mintos	Prince Albert	Art Hauser Centre	2
Regina Pat Canadians	Regina	Co-operators Centre	4
Saskatoon Blazers	Saskatoon	Harold Latrace Arena/Rod Hamm Memorial Arena	0
Saskatoon Contacts	Saskatoon	Merlis Belsher Place	1
Swift Current Legionnaires	Swift Current	Credit Union iPlex	0
Tisdale Trojans	Tisdale	Tisdale RECplex	1
Warman Wildcats	Warman	Legends Centre	0
Yorkton SECON Maulers	Yorkton	Farrell Agencies Arena	1

== SMAAAHL Alumni ==
- Carter Ashton – Saskatoon Contacts
- James Wright – Saskatoon Contacts
- Jared Cowen – Saskatoon Contacts
- Jaden Schwartz – Notre Dame Hounds
- Brad Richards – Notre Dame Hounds
- Tyler Myers – Notre Dame Hounds
- Vincent Lecavalier – Notre Dame Hounds
- Jarret Stoll – Saskatoon Blazers
- Rhett Warrener – Saskatoon Blazers
- Brent Sopel – Saskatoon Contacts
- Colby Armstrong – Saskatoon Blazers
- Riley Armstrong – Yorkton Harvest
- Cory Sarich – Saskatoon Contacts
- Ryan Bayda – Saskatoon Contacts
- Brayden Schenn – Saskatoon Contacts
- Luke Schenn – Saskatoon Contacts
- Patrick Marleau – Swift Current Legionnaires
- Nolan Schaefer – Yorkton Harvest
- Peter Schaefer – Yorkton Harvest
- Nick Schultz – Yorkton Harvest
- Nathan Paetsch – Tisdale Trojans
- Brooks Laich – Tisdale Trojans
- Jordan Hendry – Tisdale Trojans
- Tyson Strachan – Tisdale Trojans
- Wendel Clark – Notre Dame Hounds
- Rod Brind'Amour – Notre Dame Hounds
- Sean Couturier – Notre Dame Hounds
- Morgan Rielly – Notre Dame Hounds
- Dwight King – Beardy's Blackhawks
- Josh Manson – Prince Albert Mintos
- Chris Kunitz – Yorkton Maulers
- Dillon Dubé – Notre Dame Argos
