= Jake Gardiner =

American ice hockey player (born 1990)

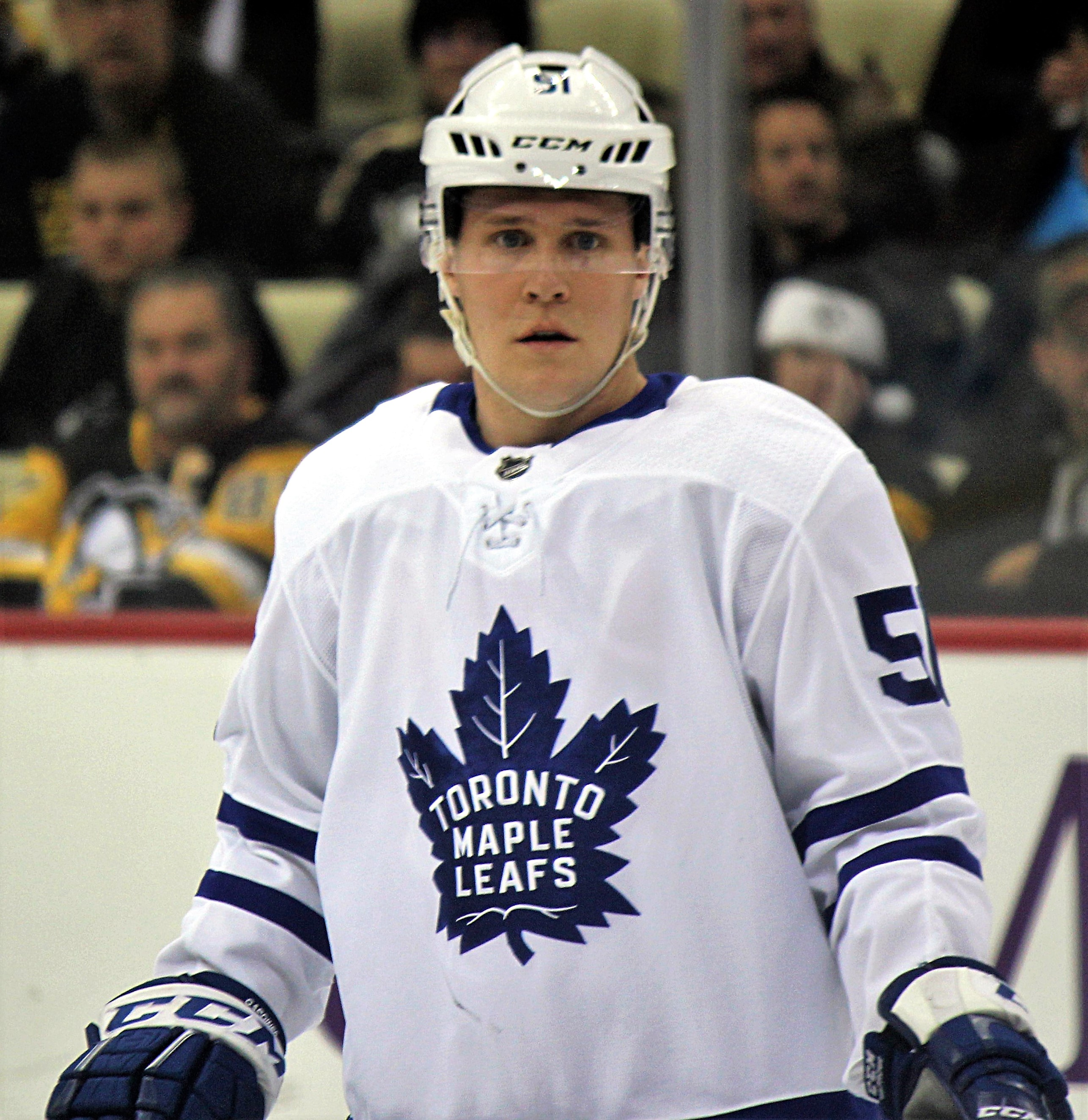
- Gardiner with the Toronto Maple Leafs in 2017
- Born: July 4, 1990 (age 36) Minneapolis, Minnesota, U.S.
- Height: 6 ft 2 in (188 cm)
- Weight: 203 lb (92 kg; 14 st 7 lb)
- Position: Defense
- Shot: Left
- Played for: Toronto Maple Leafs; Carolina Hurricanes
- National team: United States
- NHL draft: 17th overall, 2008; Anaheim Ducks
- Playing career: 2011–2021

Jake William Gardiner (born July 4, 1990) is an American former professional ice hockey defenseman. He played for the Toronto Maple Leafs and Carolina Hurricanes of the National Hockey League (NHL). He was drafted 17th overall by the Anaheim Ducks in the 2008 NHL entry draft.

== Early life ==
Gardiner was born on July 4, 1990, in Minneapolis, Minnesota, to businessman John and John Gardiner. While he was born in Minneapolis, Gardiner considers Hopkins, Minnesota his hometown. His father played high school ice hockey and his brother and uncle played college hockey. He also grew up alongside a younger sister, Paige.

== Playing career ==
=== Early career ===
Gardiner began playing organized ice hockey in Hopkins, Minnesota. During his minor hockey career, Gardiner wore jersey #19 and played as a forward like his childhood idol Joe Sakic. He played as a forward until his senior season at Minnetonka High School. Before his senior year, his coach was advised by Minnesota State Mankato coach Troy Jutting to move Gardiner to a defenceman position. Gardiner practiced as a defeceman over the summer and played for Team USA's under-18 Select team in his new position. As a defenseman full-time in his senior year, Gardiner scored a career-high and team-leading 20 goals and 28 assists. He was named the Minnesota Star Tribune's Metro Player of the Year and a top-10 finalist for the Minnesota Mr. Hockey Award. Gardiner quickly became a projected first round pick in the 2008 NHL entry draft and interviewed with the New Jersey Devils, Florida Panthers, Anaheim Ducks, and Ottawa Senators. He was eventually drafted in the first round, 17th overall, by the Anaheim Ducks. Despite his high draft place, he still chose to enroll at the University of Wisconsin–Madison for the 2008–09 season.

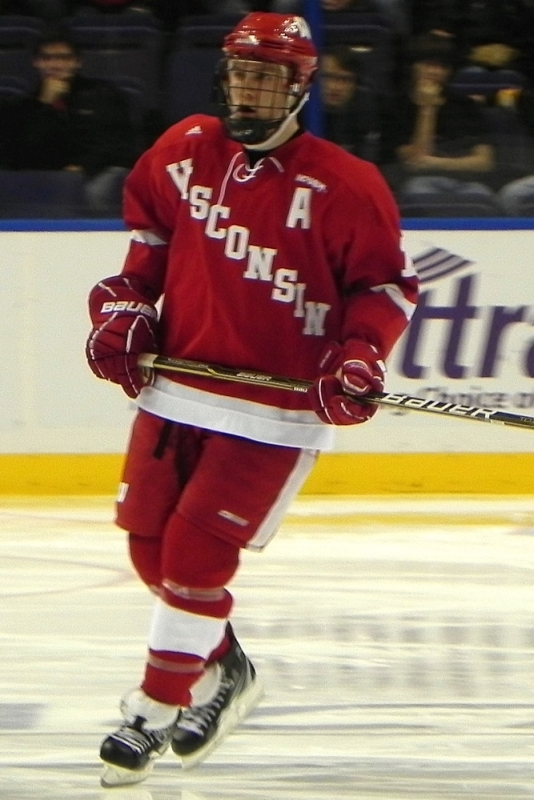
Gardiner with the Badgers during his third year at the University of Wisconsin

=== Collegiate ===
Gardiner played three seasons with the University of Wisconsin Badgers and finished with 19 goals, 56 assists, and 75 points through 121 games. Gardiner began the 2008–09 season as the team's scoring leader with five points through four games. He finished with three goals and 18 assists for 21 points and was named to the WCHA All-Rookie Team. Gardiner experienced a dip in production during his sophomore season and finished with 13 points through 41 games.

Gardiner returned to the Badgers for the 2010–11 season as an assistant captain. After Gardiner and the Badgers participated in the College Hockey Showcase, he earned WCHA offensive player of the week honors. In early February, Gardiner's playing rights were traded to the Toronto Maple Leafs along with Joffrey Lupul and a fourth-round draft pick in exchange for defenseman François Beauchemin. Gardiner scored a career-high 10 goals and 31 assists as the Badgers advanced to the NCAA championship against Boston University. He forfeited his final collegiate season on March 15, 2011, by signing a three-year entry-level contract with the Maple Leafs. Gardiner was also named to the West Second-Team All-American team and All-WCHA Second Team.

=== Professional ===
==== Toronto Maple Leafs ====
Gardiner participated in the Leafs' rookie camp and training camp ahead of the 2011–12 season. After performing poorly at the rookie camp, Gardiner greatly impressed the Leafs coaching staff at training camp, with head coach Ron Wilson calling him "the biggest surprise." He was subsequently named to the Leafs' final roster and made his NHL debut on October 6, 2011, against the Montreal Canadiens. He played in one more game for the Leafs before sitting as a healthy scratch for a few games. By December, Gardiner's ice time had greatly increased and he was one of only four NHL rookies to play over 20 minutes per game. However, after going scoreless and sitting as a healthy scratch for four consecutive games, Gardiner was reassigned to the Leafs' American Hockey League (AHL) affiliate, the Toronto Marlies, on January 15, 2012. He played one game with the Marlies before being recalled to the NHL level. Shortly after rejoining the team, Gardiner scored his first career NHL goal on January 24, against the New York Islanders. While teams inquired about a trade for Gardiner, Leafs general manager Brian Burke refused to move him. Gardiner finished the season leading all NHL rookie defensemen in scoring with 30 points and ranked third among rookies in average ice time per game. After his rookie campaign, Gardiner was named to the NHL All-Rookie Team.

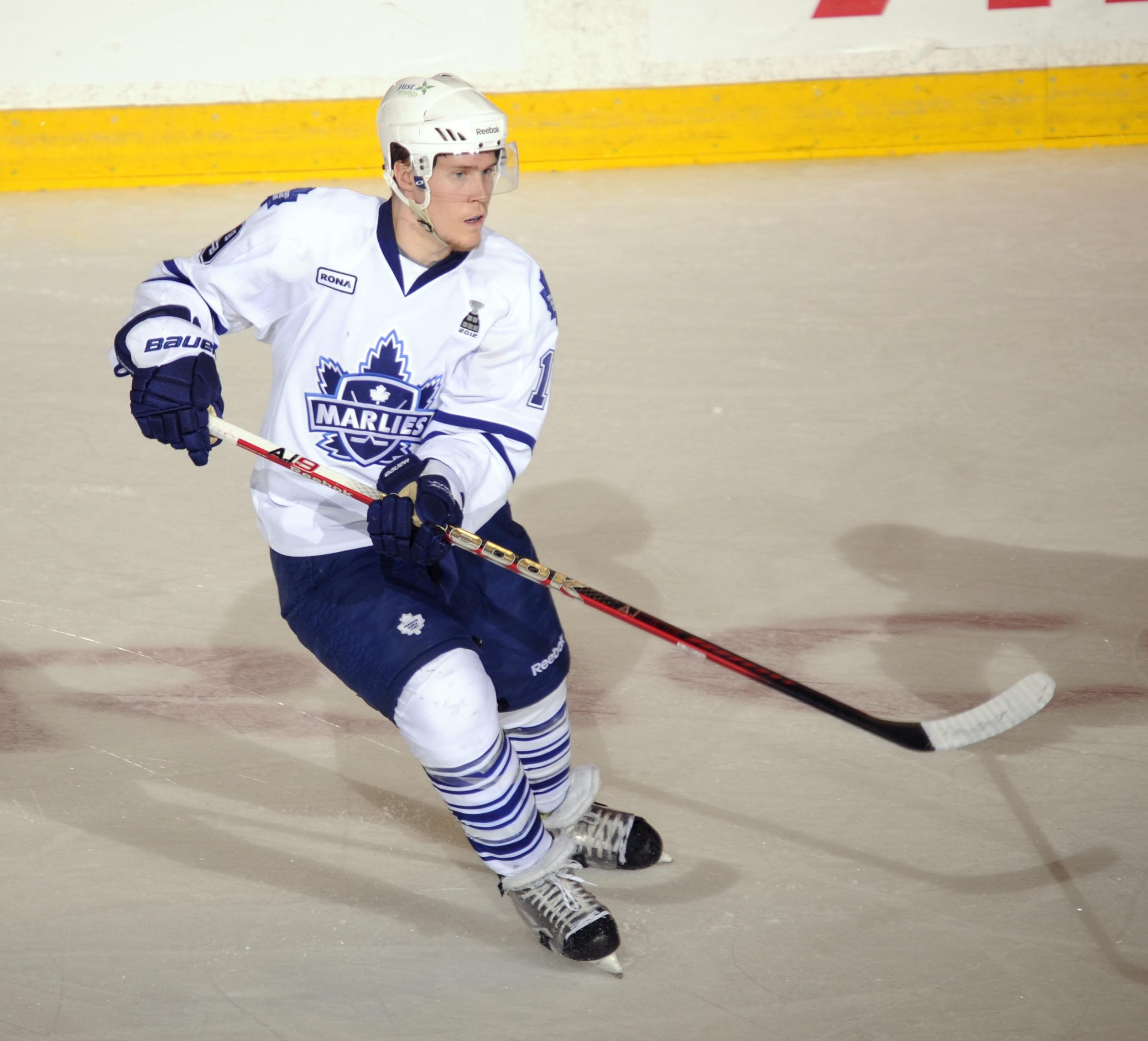
Gardiner with the Toronto Marlies in 2012.

Due to the 2012–13 NHL lockout, Gardiner started his second professional season in the AHL with the Toronto Marlies. He quickly formed a defensive partnership with Michael Kostka and scored three goals in his first six games of the season. He quickly amassed 17 points through 22 games before suffering from a sore neck and headaches due to a hit on December 8. He missed over a month of game play to recover. Gardiner played two games for the Maple Leafs in January, once the lockout ended, before being returned to the Marlies. In protest of Gardiner's lengthy stay in the AHL, Gardiner's agent tweeted #FreeJakeGardiner on social media. Marlies coach Dallas Eakins said that he took offence to the "notion that Jake Gardiner is locked up somewhere that he needs to be freed from." Shortly after this, Gardiner called Maple Leafs general manager Dave Nonis to discuss his intentions and reiterate that he was happy with the Marlies. Unbeknownst to Gardiner, the Leafs planned on calling him up to the NHL level that day. Gardiner remained with the Leafs for the remainder of the 2012–13 season and appeared in his first Stanley Cup playoffs game. He was scratched for the final four games of the regular season and Game 1 of the 2013 Stanley Cup playoffs before making his postseason debut in Game 2. He scored one assist in 17:45 minutes of ice time in his debut to help lead the Leafs to a win over the Boston Bruins. Gardiner remained in the Leafs lineup and joined Cody Franson as the team's second defensive pairing. In Game 3, Gardiner became the first Maple Leaf player to score a home playoff goal since Mats Sundin in 2004. He finished the series fourth on the team in scoring with five points through six games. Despite only playing six out of the team's seven games, he also ranked fourth in ice time.

Gardiner played the entirety of the 2013–14 season in the NHL for the first time in his career. He began the season with three points through 15 games while playing alongside Paul Ranger. After sitting as a healthy scratch for a week in January, Gardiner was promoted to the Leafs top power-play unit. He was also paired with fellow young defenceman Morgan Rielly. They played 10 games together before head coach Randy Carlyle reunited Gardiner with Franson. Gardiner finished the season with a career-high 31 points through 80 games, including 11 goals on the power-play. After the Maple Leafs failed to make a playoff run, Gardiner was selected to represent Team USA at the 2014 IIHF World Championship. As a restricted free agent, Gardiner signed a five-year, $20.25 million contract extension with the Maple Leafs on July 29, 2014.

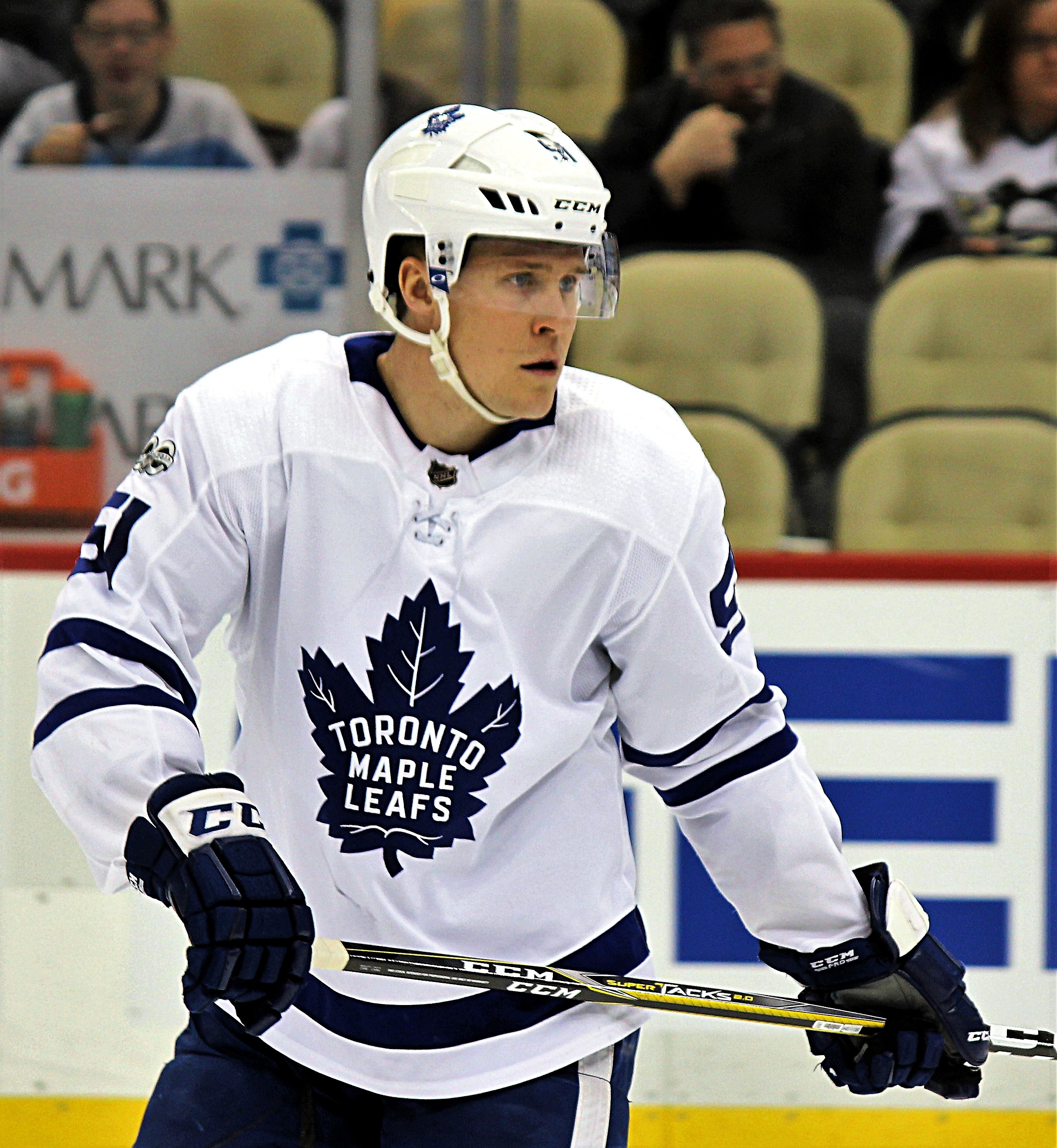
Gardiner with the Maple Leafs in 2017.

Gardiner and the Leafs struggled in the 2014–15 season, and Gardiner managed only 4 goals and 24 points in 79 games.

For the 2015–16 season, the Leafs hired a new head coach, Mike Babcock, and cleared out Dion Phaneuf by the trade deadline. Gardiner had 7 goals and 31 points, second to Morgan Rielly among Leafs' defenders, taking a step forward under a new coach, even though the team lost the scoring presence of Phil Kessel.

In 2016–17, the Leafs became a winning team once again, an especially high scoring one with the addition of scoring phenoms Auston Matthews, William Nylander, and Mitch Marner, among others. Gardiner posted a career high of 43 points, and was a +24, leading all Leafs' defenders in both categories.

During the 2017–18 season, Gardiner recorded his 50th point of the season on April 2, 2018, in a game against the Buffalo Sabres. With his 50th point, and fellow defenceman Morgan Rielly already having 51 points, they became the first two Leafs defensemen with at least 50 points in a season since Tomáš Kaberle and Bryan McCabe did it in 2006–07. Both Gardiner and Rielly ended the regular season with a career high 52 points to help the Leafs to their second consecutive playoff showing, in which they would lose to the Boston Bruins in seven games in the first round.

The following season, Gardiner played in his 500th career NHL game on October 27, 2018, against the Winnipeg Jets. In the game, he scored the tying goal in the third period to help the Leafs defeat the Jets 3–2.

==== Carolina Hurricanes ====
On September 6, 2019, Gardiner signed a four-year, $16.2 million contract with the Carolina Hurricanes.

Prior to entering his third season with the Hurricanes on September 7, 2021, it was announced that Gardiner was to undergo hip and back surgeries, which ruled him out for the entirety of the 2021–22 season. Gardiner was reported to be healthy prior to the 2022–23 season, but suffered a setback with his recovery and missed an entire second season. Gardiner's contract with the Hurricanes expired following the 2022–23 season, and he has not played professionally since his second season with the Hurricanes.

== International play ==
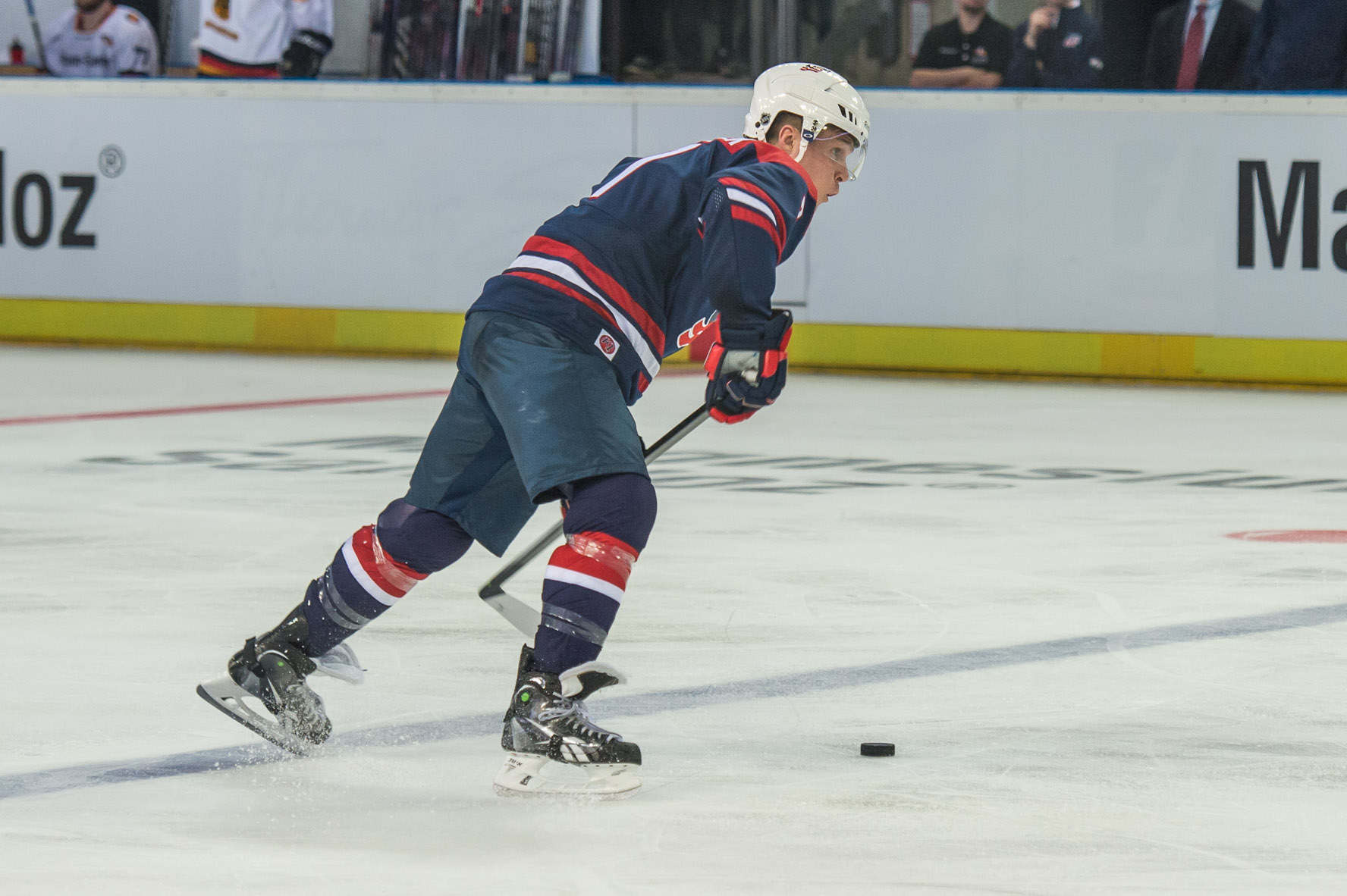
- Gardiner with the U.S. national ice hockey team during the 2014 IIHF World Championship

Medal record

Representing United States

Ice hockey

World Championships
Bronze medal – third place	2015 Czech Republic	

World Junior Championships
Gold medal – first place	2010 Canada	

After the Toronto Maple Leafs failed to make a playoff run in the 2013–14 season, Gardiner joined teammates Nazem Kadri, James Reimer and Morgan Rielly to compete in the 2014 IIHF World Championship. He joined Team USA under coach Peter Laviolette, where the nation lost in the quarter-finals. The following year, Gardiner was again named to Team USA for the 2015 IIHF World Championship, where they placed third.

== Personal life ==
On July 9, 2017, Gardiner married his long-time girlfriend Lucy, a fitness instructor, businesswoman, and social media influencer. In September 2018, Lucy gave birth to their first child, a son.

== Career statistics ==
=== Regular season and playoffs ===
			Regular season					Playoffs
Season	Team	League	GP	G	A	Pts	PIM	GP	G	A	Pts	PIM
2005–06	Minnetonka High	USHS	21	2	14	16	6	—	—	—	—	—
2006–07	Minnetonka High	USHS	19	10	22	32	20	—	—	—	—	—
2007–08	Minnetonka High	USHS	24	20	28	48	14	—	—	—	—	—
2008–09	University of Wisconsin	WCHA	39	3	18	21	16	—	—	—	—	—
2009–10	University of Wisconsin	WCHA	41	6	7	13	20	—	—	—	—	—
2010–11	University of Wisconsin	WCHA	41	10	31	41	24	—	—	—	—	—
2010–11	Toronto Marlies	AHL	10	0	3	3	4	—	—	—	—	—
2011–12	Toronto Marlies	AHL	4	0	2	2	2	17	2	9	11	10
2011–12	Toronto Maple Leafs	NHL	75	7	23	30	18	—	—	—	—	—
2012–13	Toronto Marlies	AHL	43	10	21	31	12	—	—	—	—	—
2012–13	Toronto Maple Leafs	NHL	12	0	4	4	0	6	1	4	5	0
2013–14	Toronto Maple Leafs	NHL	80	10	21	31	19	—	—	—	—	—
2014–15	Toronto Maple Leafs	NHL	79	4	20	24	24	—	—	—	—	—
2015–16	Toronto Maple Leafs	NHL	79	7	24	31	32	—	—	—	—	—
2016–17	Toronto Maple Leafs	NHL	82	9	34	43	34	6	1	2	3	4
2017–18	Toronto Maple Leafs	NHL	82	5	47	52	32	7	0	2	2	2
2018–19	Toronto Maple Leafs	NHL	62	3	27	30	26	7	0	2	2	0
2019–20	Carolina Hurricanes	NHL	68	4	20	24	30	6	0	1	1	2
2020–21	Carolina Hurricanes	NHL	26	0	8	8	11	1	0	0	0	0
NHL totals			645	49	228	277	226	33	2	11	13	8

=== International ===
Year	Team	Event	Result	GP	G	A	Pts	PIM
2010	United States	WJC	1st place, gold medalist(s)	7	0	3	3	4
2014	United States	WC	6th	8	1	3	4	0
2015	United States	WC	3rd place, bronze medalist(s)	8	1	0	1	0
Junior totals				7	0	3	3	4
Senior totals				16	2	3	5	0

== Awards and honors ==
Award	Year
College
All-WCHA Rookie Team	2008–09
All-WCHA Second Team	2010–11
AHCA West Second-Team All-American	2010–11
NHL
NHL All-Rookie Team	2011–12

Awards and achievements
Preceded by Logan MacMillan	Anaheim Ducks first-round draft pick 2008	Succeeded by Peter Holland
