= Morgan Rielly =

Canadian ice hockey player (born 1994)

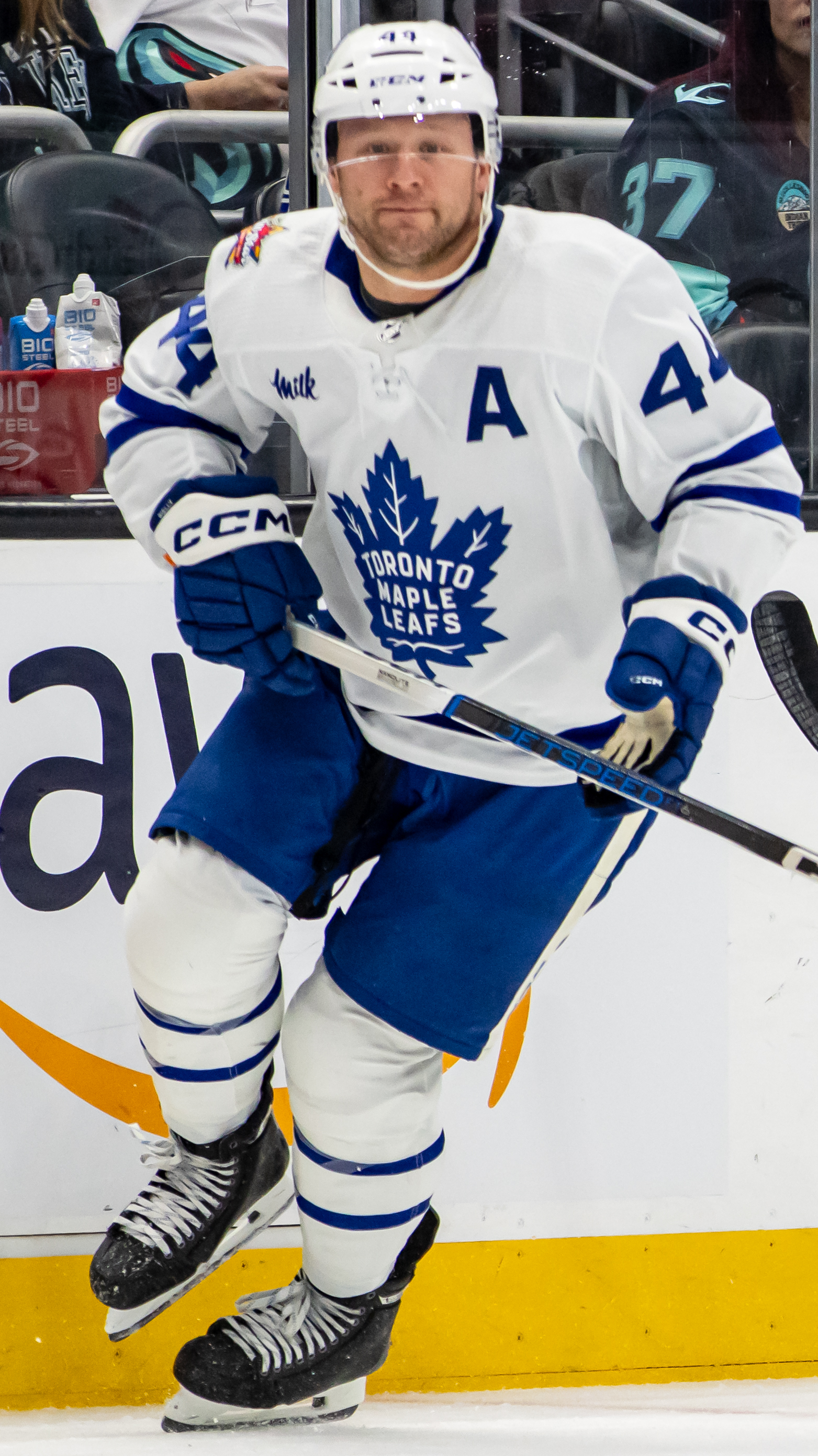
- Rielly with the Toronto Maple Leafs in 2024
- Born: March 9, 1994 (age 32) Vancouver, British Columbia, Canada
- Height: 6 ft 1 in (185 cm)
- Weight: 219 lb (99 kg; 15 st 9 lb)
- Position: Defence
- Shoots: Left
- NHL team: Toronto Maple Leafs
- National team: Canada
- NHL draft: 5th overall, 2012; Toronto Maple Leafs
- Playing career: 2013–present

Morgan Frederick Rielly /ˈraɪli/ (born March 9, 1994) is a Canadian professional ice hockey player who is a defenceman and alternate captain for the Toronto Maple Leafs of the National Hockey League (NHL). He was drafted by the Maple Leafs in the first round, fifth overall, of the 2012 NHL entry draft. Before being drafted, Rielly played with the Moose Jaw Warriors of the Western Hockey League (WHL). He has represented Canada internationally on several occasions, most notably at the 2016 World Championship, where he won a gold medal.

== Playing career ==
=== Amateur ===
Rielly was selected second overall by the Moose Jaw Warriors of the Western Hockey League (WHL) in the 2009 WHL bantam draft. Before entering the WHL, Rielly played minor ice hockey for the Notre Dame Hounds in Wilcox, Saskatchewan. In his final season with the Hounds, Rielly was the top-scoring defenceman in the Saskatchewan Midget AAA Hockey League, with 55 points in 43 games. His team captured Canada's national midget championship. Rielly joined the Warriors for the 2010–11 WHL season, playing in 65 games and recording 28 points. Heading into the 2011–12 WHL season, Rielly was a highly ranked prospect for the 2012 NHL entry draft. He suffered a serious knee injury, a torn anterior cruciate ligament, causing him to miss most of the season. He returned for the tail end of the Warriors playoff run against the Edmonton Oil Kings. Despite the injury, Rielly still finished the season ranked fifth among North American skaters by the NHL Central Scouting Bureau. Rielly was selected by the Toronto Maple Leafs in the first round, fifth overall, and he signed a contract with the club shortly before the 2012–13 NHL lockout. He spent the 2012–13 season with the Warriors, with a stint in January 2013 at the Toronto Maple Leafs' training camp, but eventually was returned to finish the season in the WHL.

=== Professional ===
Rielly made his professional debut at the end of the 2012–13 season with the Toronto Marlies of the American Hockey League (AHL). At the start of the 2013–14 NHL season, Rielly made the Maple Leafs' roster out of training camp. He made his NHL debut on October 5, 2013, against the Ottawa Senators. On December 16, Rielly scored his first NHL goal, against Marc-André Fleury of the Pittsburgh Penguins.

Rielly recorded his first multi-goal game with two goals against Cam Talbot of the New York Rangers on February 10, 2015.

Throughout the 2015–16 season, Rielly earned much praise from Maple Leafs' head coach Mike Babcock, as well as other figures of management. In addition, he would see an increase in ice time, often appearing on the top pairing for the club. He also set career highs in multiple offensive categories such as goals, assists and points. Rielly signed a six-year, $30 million contract on April 13, 2016, carrying an average value of $5 million a season. Before the 2016–17 season, Rielly was named as one of the Maple Leafs' alternate captains, along with teammates Tyler Bozak, Leo Komarov, and Matt Hunwick. He had his first career four-point game (one goal and three assists), on November 11, 2016, during a 6–3 win against the Philadelphia Flyers. He spent most of the 2016–17 season with rookie Nikita Zaitsev on the Maple Leafs' shutdown defence pairing, and finished the season with 27 points in 76 games. Rielly was nominated for the Bill Masterton Memorial Trophy at the end of the 2016–17 season.

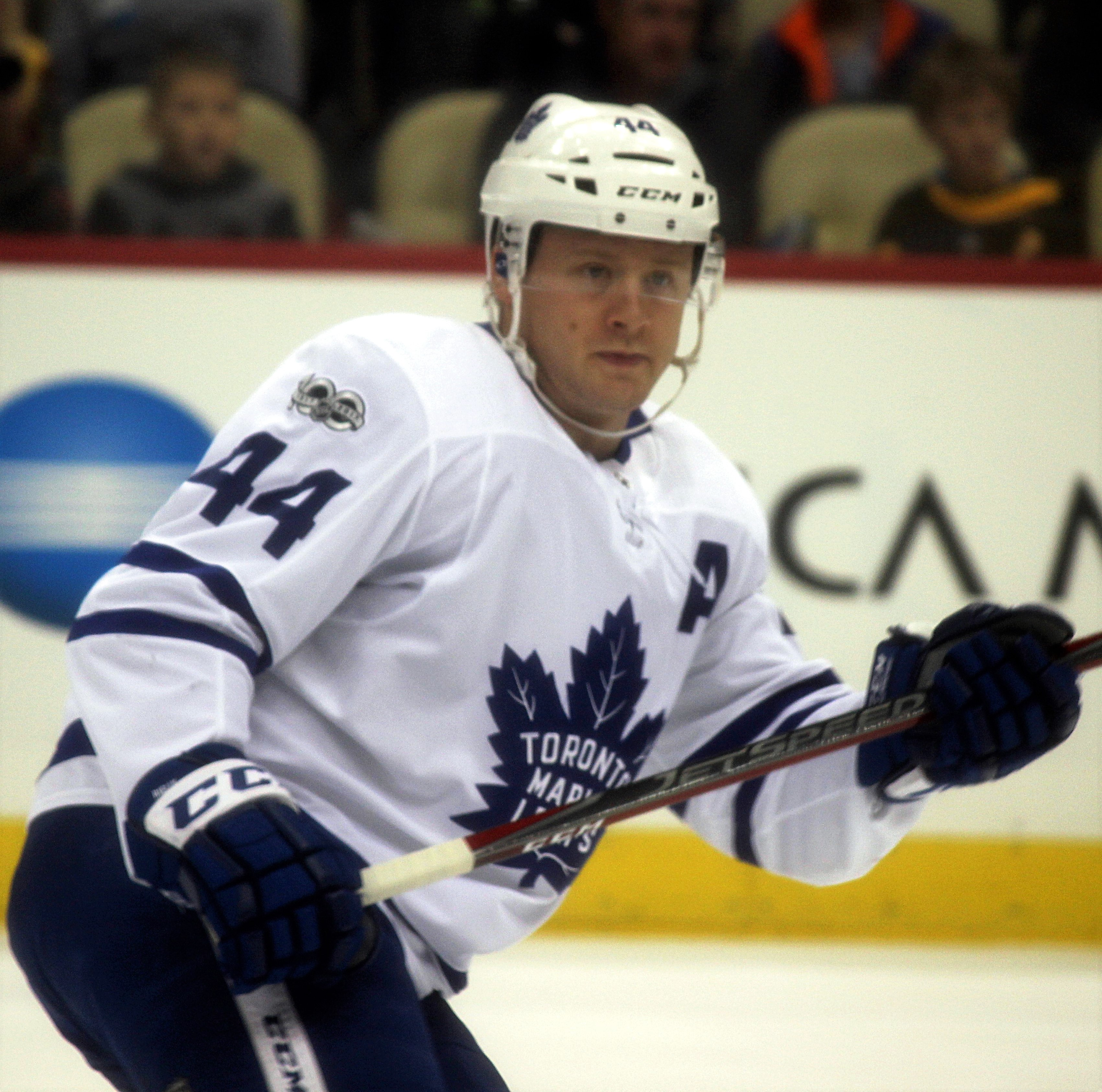
Rielly during the 2017–18 season. Rielly ended the season with a then-career high 52 points, helping the Leafs make their second consecutive playoffs.

During the 2017–18 season, Rielly was injured in a game against the Philadelphia Flyers on January 19, 2018, and was placed on injured reserve on January 22. He was back in the Maple Leafs' lineup on February 3, after missing six games. Despite his injury, Rielly and fellow defenceman Jake Gardiner became the first two Toronto's defencemen to record at least 50 points in a season since Tomáš Kaberle and Bryan McCabe accomplished the feat in 2006–07. He ended the regular season with a career-high 46 assists and 52 points, tying Gardiner for the team points leader amongst Maple Leafs' defencemen, and helped propel the team to their second consecutive playoff showing. Despite pushing the Boston Bruins to seven games, the Maple Leafs lost the series in the first round, as Rielly finished the playoffs with five points.

During the 2018–19 season, on October 9, 2018, Rielly recorded a career-high four assists in a 7–4 win over the Dallas Stars, bringing him to 10 points in his first four games, tying him for the NHL lead in points alongside teammate Auston Matthews. In the following game, on October 11, against the Detroit Red Wings, Rielly passed Bobby Orr for most points by a defenceman in a team's first five games, with 12 points. By picking up an assist the next game, he established the longest season-opening point streak by a defenceman in franchise history. On October 14, Rielly was named as one of the NHL's 3 Stars of the Week for the first time in his career. He had an NHL-leading six assists, along with an overtime goal against the Chicago Blackhawks, during a four-game Maple Leafs' win streak. He was named as the NHL's second star of the week for his accomplishments. On December 20, during a 6–1 win over the Florida Panthers, Rielly recorded his second four-assist game of the season, becoming the first NHL defenceman that year to reach the 40-point mark. On December 24, Rielly was again named as NHL's second star of the week. He led the NHL with three goals, six assists, nine points and a +10 rating the previous week to propel the Maple Leafs to a perfect week and into second place in the overall league standings. On January 23, 2019, Rielly became the first Maple Leafs' defenceman to post consecutive 50-point seasons since Tomáš Kaberle in 2005–06, 2006–07 and 2007–08 seasons. Rielly reached the 50-point mark while skating in his 49th personal game of 2018–19. Only three other Maple Leafs' defencemen have reached the mark faster – Börje Salming (42 games in 1976–77), Babe Pratt (44 games in 1943–44), and Bryan McCabe (45 games in 2005–06). He scored his 20th goal of the season on March 16, against the Ottawa Senators. With his 20th goal of the season, Rielly became the first Maple Leafs' defenceman to score 20 goals in a season since Al Iafrate in the 1989–90 season. Rielly ended the season with a career-high 20 goals and 52 assists for 72 points, the first 70+ point season by a Maple Leafs' defenceman since Börje Salming in 1980. He was one of only three defencemen under 25 to record at least 50 points that season, along with Thomas Chabot and Jacob Trouba.

On October 29, 2021, Rielly signed an eight-year, $60 million extension with the Maple Leafs.

The 2022–23 regular season was considered disappointing for Rielly by his prior standards, even notwithstanding a knee injury that caused him to miss 15 games in November and December. However, after the team had experienced years of disappointments in the playoffs, serially failing to make it past the first round, Rielly proved critical to the Maple Leafs' success in the first round of the 2023 Stanley Cup playoffs against the Tampa Bay Lightning. Notably, he scored the game-winning overtime goal in game 3 to give Toronto the lead in the series for the first time, and then scored the game-tying goal in the closing minutes of game 4, which would ultimately allow them to take a 3–1 lead. The Maples Leafs later won the series in six games, the franchise's first series win since 2004.

On February 10, 2024, at the end of a 5–3 loss to the Ottawa Senators, Rielly received a five-minute major and a game misconduct for cross checking Ridly Greig in the head after Greig took a slap shot to score an empty net goal. Following a league hearing, Rielly was suspended for five games.

During the 2024–NHL season, Rielly experienced an inconsistent regular season while adjusting to new head coach Craig Berube's system. Despite this, he remained durable, appearing in all 82 games and recording 41 points. Rielly again elevated his play in the postseason, leading all Maple Leafs defencemen with four goals and seven points in 13 games. He scored in each of the first two games of the opening round against the Ottawa Senators, helping Toronto take a 2–0 series lead before winning the matchup 4–2. In the second round against the Florida Panthers, Rielly scored in a game 1 victory, added two assists in a game 2 win, and later tallied a game-tying goal in game 3, which Florida ultimately won in overtime. However, Toronto was eliminated in seven games.

During the 2025–26 season, Rielly became the second-highest scoring defenceman in franchise history when he recorded an assist in a 5–3 loss to the Boston Bruins on November 11, 2025. The assist was his 438th NHL assist, moving him past Tomáš Kaberle on the franchise leaderboard.

== International play ==
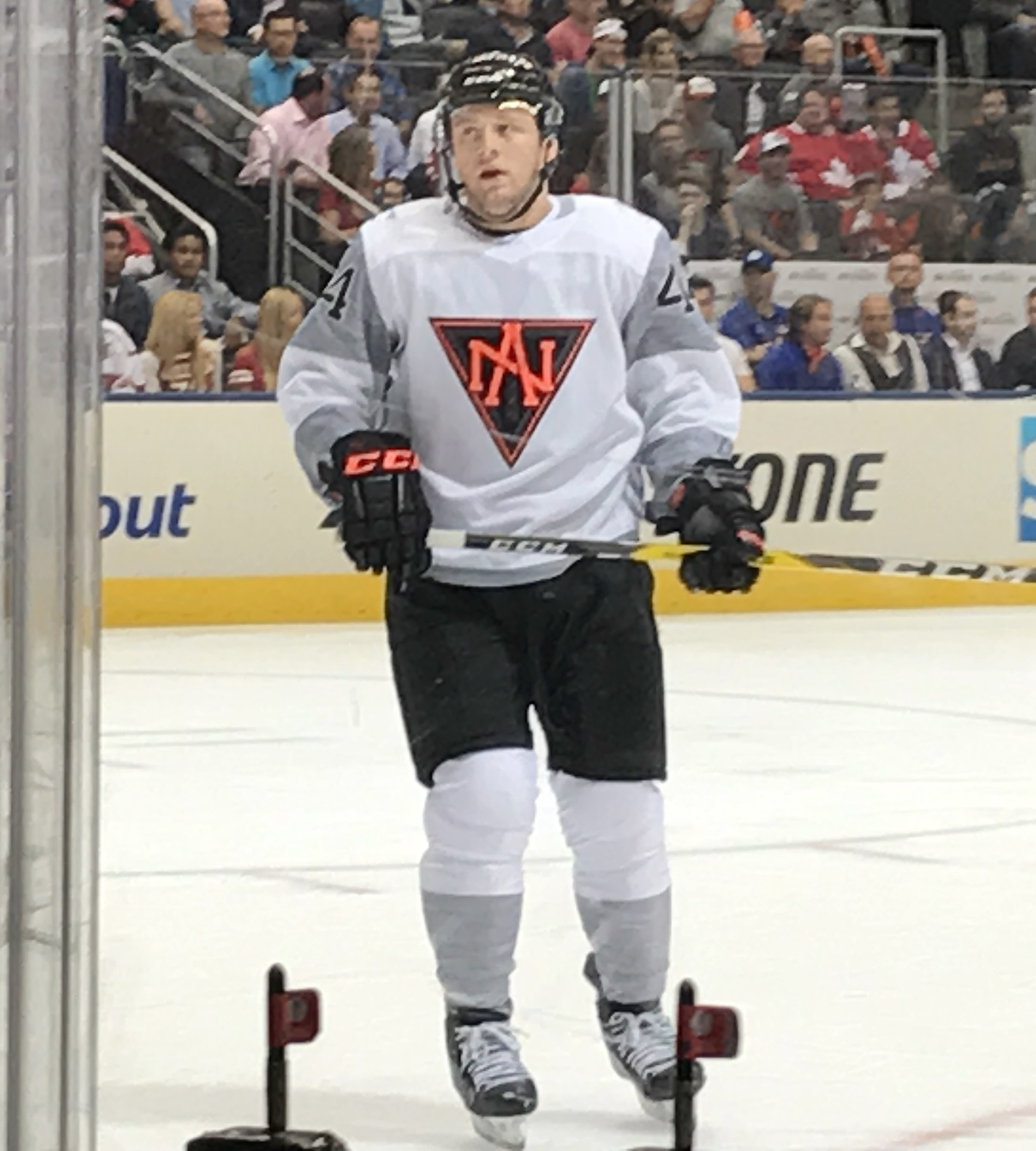
- Rielly at the 2016 World Cup of Hockey

Medal record

Men's ice hockey

Representing Canada

World Championships
Gold medal – first place	2016 Russia	

Ivan Hlinka Memorial Tournament
Gold medal – first place	2011 Czech Republic/Slovakia	

Representing Canada Pacific

World U-17 Hockey Challenge
Bronze medal – third place	2011 Canada	

Rielly represents Canada internationally. He started out in regional and age-group competitions. When he was representing Team Pacific at the 2011 World U-17 Hockey Challenge, Rielly scored two goals in five games and helped his team capture a bronze medal. Later that year, Rielly was part of Canada's gold medal-winning squad at the 2011 Ivan Hlinka Memorial Tournament. Rielly's first experience at an International Ice Hockey Federation-sanctioned event was the 2011 World U18 Championships, where he recorded two goals and one assist in seven games. Canada finished fourth at the tournament.

During the 2012–13 NHL lockout, Rielly was selected to represent Canada at the 2013 World Junior Championships, again finishing in fourth place. In 2014, Rielly was named to Canada's roster for the 2014 World Championship. Again in 2016, Rielly was named to Canada's roster for the 2016 World Championship, where he was named one of Canada's most valuable players. Canada would go on to win the tournament with a 2–0 victory over Finland in the final. Throughout the tournament, Rielly recorded the most ice time of any player on Canada. For this accomplishment, he was named to the tournament All-Star team.

For the 2016 World Cup of Hockey, Rielly was placed on Team North America, a team of North American players aged 23 or younger. In three games with Team North America, Rielly tallied two points (one goal and one assist). Team North America went 2–1–0 in the tournament, scoring 10 goals and conceding eight, suffering elimination following Finland's loss to Russia.

== Personal life ==
Growing up, Rielly was a fan of the Toronto Maple Leafs. His paternal family is from Hamilton, Ontario, and are fans of the Maple Leafs. His mother, Shirley, is a cancer researcher and owns a medical company. He has an older brother. He is of Irish descent.

Until September 2015, Rielly and then-teammate Jake Gardiner were roommates. Despite parting ways, the two remained friends and Rielly was a groomsman at Gardiner's wedding.

After several years of dating, Rielly's engagement to Canadian ice dancer Tessa Virtue was reported in early 2023. According to Rielly, they met one another via a mutual friend. The couple married later in 2023, and their wedding was covered by Hello! In July 2024, Virtue gave birth to their first child.

In response to the NHL banning themed jerseys and specifically pride tape for LGBT Pride Nights, Rielly told media, "It's unfortunate. But I think as players and as people we're going to continue to support those people and those causes that we think need it or are worthy and very deserving of it. Whatever statement was made is fine, but as players, we're going to continue to offer support and be allies. We want to be a part of this community."

== Career statistics ==
=== Regular season and playoffs ===
			Regular season					Playoffs
Season	Team	League	GP	G	A	Pts	PIM	GP	G	A	Pts	PIM
2008–09	Notre Dame Hounds	SMAAAHL	4	0	2	2	4	—	—	—	—	—
2009–10	Notre Dame Hounds	SMAAAHL	43	18	37	55	20	13	7	2	11	0
2010–11	Moose Jaw Warriors	WHL	65	6	22	28	21	6	0	6	6	0
2011–12	Moose Jaw Warriors	WHL	18	3	15	18	2	5	0	3	3	0
2012–13	Moose Jaw Warriors	WHL	60	12	42	54	19	—	—	—	—	—
2012–13	Toronto Marlies	AHL	14	1	2	3	0	8	1	0	1	0
2013–14	Toronto Maple Leafs	NHL	73	2	25	27	12	—	—	—	—	—
2014–15	Toronto Maple Leafs	NHL	81	8	21	29	14	—	—	—	—	—
2015–16	Toronto Maple Leafs	NHL	82	9	27	36	28	—	—	—	—	—
2016–17	Toronto Maple Leafs	NHL	76	6	21	27	21	6	1	4	5	2
2017–18	Toronto Maple Leafs	NHL	76	6	46	52	14	7	0	5	5	4
2018–19	Toronto Maple Leafs	NHL	82	20	52	72	14	7	1	4	5	0
2019–20	Toronto Maple Leafs	NHL	47	3	24	27	24	5	1	0	1	2
2020–21	Toronto Maple Leafs	NHL	55	5	30	35	14	7	1	2	3	0
2021–22	Toronto Maple Leafs	NHL	82	10	58	68	40	7	3	3	6	17
2022–23	Toronto Maple Leafs	NHL	65	4	37	41	21	11	4	8	12	6
2023–24	Toronto Maple Leafs	NHL	72	7	51	58	27	7	0	3	3	0
2024–25	Toronto Maple Leafs	NHL	82	7	34	41	21	13	4	3	7	4
2025–26	Toronto Maple Leafs	NHL	78	11	25	36	29	—	—	—	—	—
NHL totals			951	98	451	549	279	70	15	32	47	35

=== International ===
Year	Team	Event	Result	GP	G	A	Pts	PIM
2011	Canada Pacific	WHC17	3rd place, bronze medalist(s)	6	2	3	5	4
2011	Canada	WJC18	4th	7	2	1	3	0
2012	Canada	IH18	1st place, gold medalist(s)	5	1	3	4	2
2013	Canada	WJC	4th	6	1	2	3	0
2014	Canada	WC	5th	8	1	2	3	0
2016	Canada	WC	1st place, gold medalist(s)	10	1	2	3	2
2016	Team North America	WCH	5th	3	1	1	2	0
2026	Canada	WC	4th	10	0	3	3	0
Junior totals				24	6	9	15	6
Senior totals				31	3	8	11	2

== Awards and honours ==
Award	Year	Ref
NHL
NHL All-Star Game	2024	
International
IIHF World Championships All-Star Team	2016	

Awards and achievements
Preceded by Stuart Percy	Toronto Maple Leafs first-round draft pick 2012	Succeeded by Frédérik Gauthier
