= Frédérik Gauthier =

Canadian ice hockey player (born 1995)

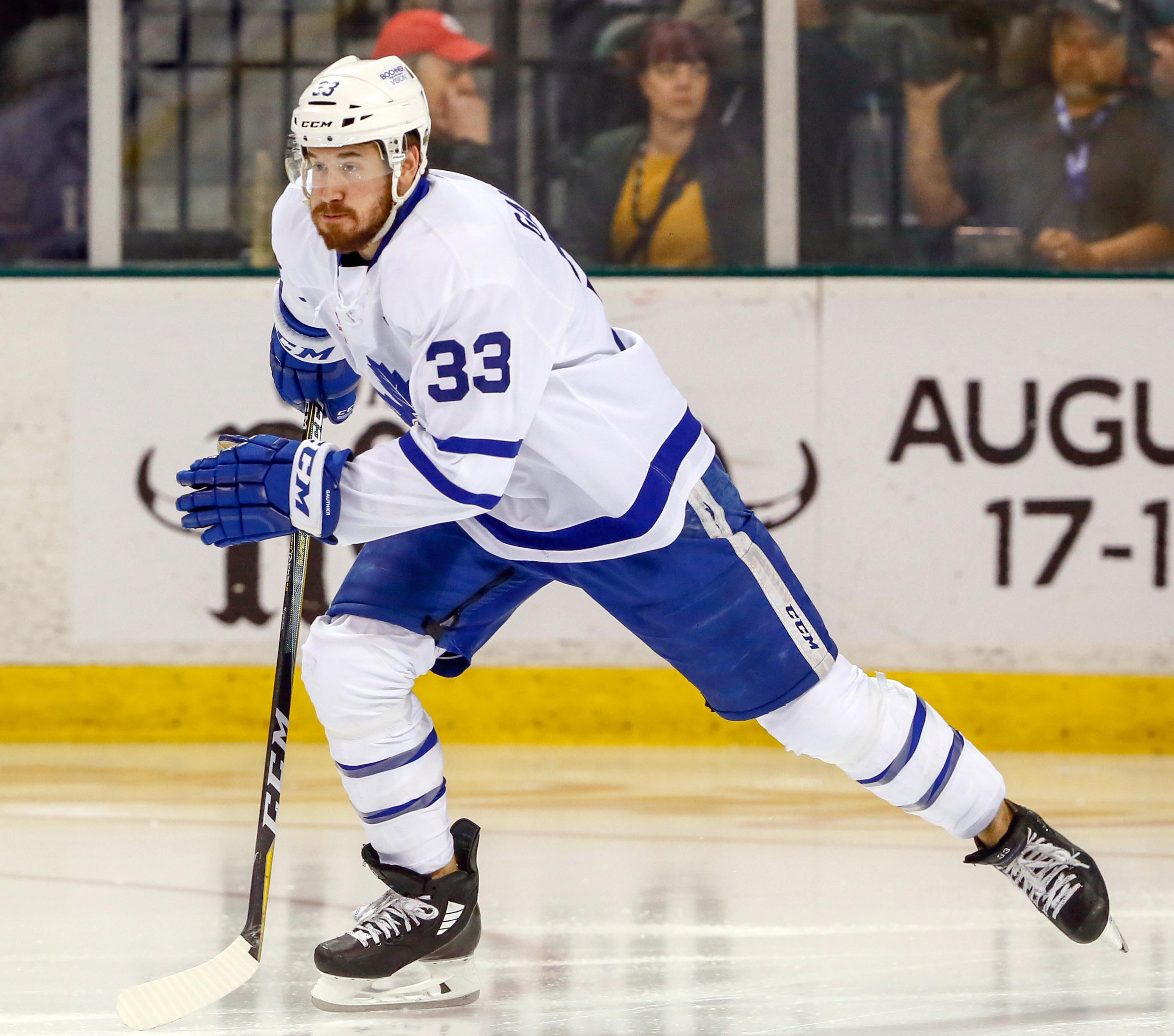
- Gauthier with the Toronto Marlies in 2018
- Born: April 26, 1995 (age 31) Laval, Quebec, Canada
- Height: 6 ft 5 in (196 cm)
- Weight: 235 lb (107 kg; 16 st 11 lb)
- Position: Forward
- Shoots: Left
- National League team Former teams: HC Ajoie; Toronto Maple Leafs; Arizona Coyotes; New Jersey Devils; HC Vityaz
- NHL draft: 21st overall, 2013; Toronto Maple Leafs
- Playing career: 2015–present

Frédérik Gauthier (born April 26, 1995) is a Canadian professional ice hockey centre who plays for HC Ajoie of the National League (NL). Gauthier was selected by the Toronto Maple Leafs of the National Hockey League (NHL) in the first round, 21st overall, of the 2013 NHL entry draft. He previously spent three years with the Rimouski Océanic in the Quebec Major Junior Hockey League (QMJHL). During his developmental years with the Maple Leafs' American Hockey League affiliate, the Toronto Marlies, he helped them clinch their first Calder Cup in franchise history.

A native of Quebec, Gauthier developed in its local minor ice hockey programs and intended to pursue a collegiate career rather than the QMJHL. After his selection by the Océanic in the QMJHL and Youngstown Phantoms in the United States Hockey League, he was encouraged by Sidney Crosby to pursue a career in his native province. During his tenure with the team, Gauthier competed for Team Canada at various international tournaments. He won a gold medal at the 2013 IIHF World U18 Championships and 2015 World Junior Ice Hockey Championships.

== Early life ==
Gauthier was born on April 26, 1995, in Laval, Quebec, Canada to parents Stéphane and Sophie Gauthier. He grew up in Mascouche, Quebec and cheered for the Montreal Canadiens growing up.

== Playing career ==
=== Youth ===
As a youth, Gauthier played in the 2008 Quebec International Pee-Wee Hockey Tournament with the Montreal Canadiens minor ice hockey team. He played alongside Anthony Duclair, although they were eventually eliminated by a team with Jonathan Drouin on its roster. Gauthier eventually advanced to the Collège Esther-Blondin Phénix in midget AAA and led the team to the 2012 Telus Cup. During the tournament, he recorded two goals and nine assist in seven games. As a teenager attending Académie Antoine-Manseau, Gauthier played quarterback on their football team in addition to hockey. He was eventually drafted by the Rimouski Océanic of the Quebec Major Junior Hockey League (QMJHL) during the 2011 QMJHL Entry Draft, although he intended to study at Harvard University and play for their Division 1 ice hockey team. In spite of this, Penguins captain Sidney Crosby, who was an Océanic alumni, convinced Gauthier to play junior ice hockey with Rimouski Océanic in the QMJHL. Gauthier also turned down the opportunity to play in the United States Hockey League with the Youngstown Phantoms.

In his rookie season with the Océanic, Gauthier was considered a top prospect after recording 60 points in 62 games. He competed in the CHL Top Prospects Game and received a final ranking of eighth amongst North American skaters from the NHL Central Scouting Bureau. Prior to the draft, he was praised as a proficient skater who could use his 6'5 body to control the puck. He fulfilled the expectation to be a first-round selection at the 2013 NHL entry draft, when he was selected 21st overall by the Toronto Maple Leafs. As his family was from Quebec, his grandfather was unhappy with his draft team and cursed out loud when he heard the news. After the draft, Gauthier was invited to their training camps in September, but returned to Rimouski for the 2013–14 season. While with the Leafs organization, he partook skating lessons with coach Barb Underhill. During that season, the Leafs signed Gauthier to a three-year, entry-level contract on November 28, 2013. Although Gauthier helped lead Rimouski to the QMJHL playoffs, they were eliminated in the second round by the Blainville-Boisbriand Armada.

Although Gauthier played less games in his final junior season, he was the recipient of the Guy Carbonneau Trophy at the conclusion of the 2014–15 season. He also led the team to the President's Cup Trophy by scoring the game winning goal in double overtime of Game 7 against the Quebec Remparts. On April 21, 2014, he signed an amateur tryout contract with the Toronto Marlies of the American Hockey League (AHL).

=== Professional ===
==== Toronto Maple Leafs ====
After attending the Maple Leafs' training camp, Gauthier joined the American Hockey League Toronto Marlies for the 2015–16 season. He recorded his first professional point on October 21, 2016, against the Rochester Americans and his first professional goal in a 3–1 win over the Lehigh Valley Phantoms. He received a call-up by the Toronto Maple Leafs on March 19, 2016, and made his NHL debut on March 19, 2016, in a game against the Buffalo Sabres. He played seven games with the Maple Leafs before being sent back to the AHL. During those seven games, Gauthier recorded his first career NHL point on April 6, 2016, with an assist on Morgan Rielly's second period goal.

After attending the Maple Leafs training camp, Gauthier was assigned to the Toronto Marlies for the 2016–17 season. After playing 16 games with the Marlies, Gauthier was recalled to the NHL on December 16, to replace an injured Martin Marincin. Gauthier would eventually record his first career NHL goal on December 22, 2016, against the Colorado Avalanche. Gauthier was subsequently recalled periodically throughout the season but played with the Marlies during their 2017 Calder Cup playoffs run. While playing in the second-round against the Syracuse Crunch, Gauthier suffered an avulsion of the hamstring injury which required surgery, ending his season. Although his projected recovery time was six months, he was back skating in less than three months. As a result of the surgery, Gauthier lost some hamstring muscles and became a bit shorter.

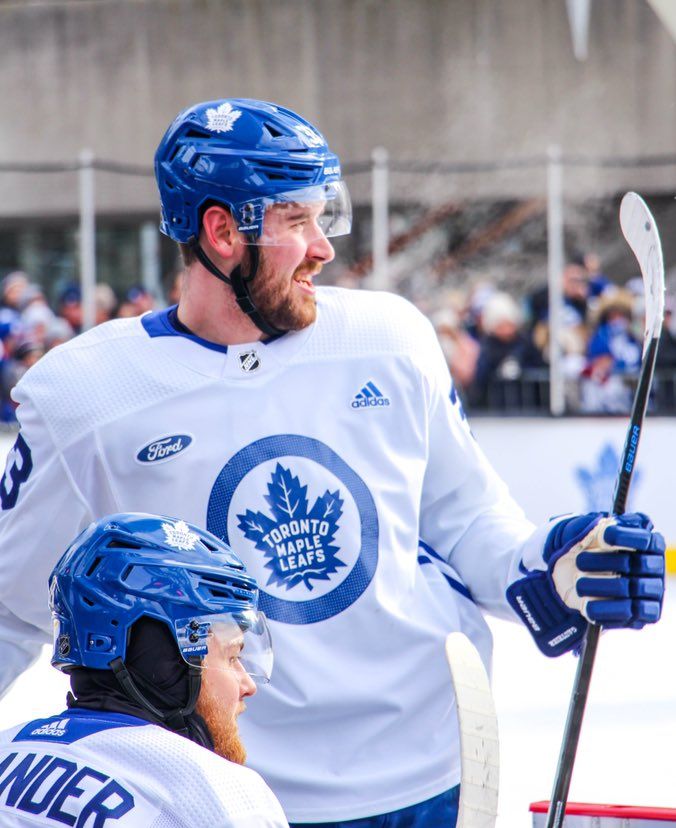
Gauthier with the Toronto Maple Leafs during their outdoor practice in 2020

Gauthier was invited to participate in the Toronto Maple Leafs training camp prior to the 2017–18 season, although he was reassigned to the Marlies. On January 2, 2018, Gauthier was called-up to the Maple Leafs to play against the Tampa Bay Lightning, a 2–0 loss. He was sent back down to the AHL on January 11 after playing five games in the NHL so that he could continue playing hockey while the Leafs were on a bye week. Gauthier and fellow Marlies player Travis Dermott were recalled on January 15. On January 23, after playing a total of nine games in the NHL during which he scored one goal, Gauthier was returned to the Marlies. He competed with the Marlies during their 2018 Calder Cup playoffs run where he helped them clinch the Calder Cup.

On July 11, 2018, Gauthier signed a two-year, two-way contract extension with the Maple Leafs. After making the team out of training camp, Gauthier stayed on the NHL roster for the entirety of the season. Gauthier played 62 games for the Maple Leafs before suffering a foot injury in March which kept him out of two games. He recovered in time to make his post-season debut with the Leafs, playing in all seven games during the first round against the Boston Bruins.

Although the 2019–20 season would eventually be delayed due to COVID-19, Gauthier started the season strong. He partook in skating lessons with Leafs coach Barb Underhill and captain John Tavares spoke highly of his progress; "He’s making plays more, feeling good about finding the open man and what’s going on in the open ice, and getting to the net." Upon the hiring of Sheldon Keefe on November 20, 2019, he experienced his first healthy scratch of the season after playing in 29 games. When inquired about his choice, Keefe stated "[w]e've liked how Fred's played, he's done well but we're trying to find the right mix for our team & we've got to try some different things. In the interim he's going to have to take a step back a little bit." After sitting as a healthy scratch for four consecutive nights, Gauthier returned to the Leafs lineup to reach a new career-high in goals.

==== Arizona Coyotes ====
As a free agent from the Maple Leafs, Gauthier remained un-signed as the 2020–21 season was delayed due to the ongoing pandemic. He was signed to a professional tryout contract to join the Arizona Coyotes training camp on December 27, 2020. After a successful training camp, Gauthier was signed by the Coyotes to a one-year, two-way contract on January 11, 2021.

==== New Jersey Devils ====
As a free agent over the summer and approaching the 2021–22 season, Gauthier for the second consecutive year signed a Professional Tryout contract in accepting an invitation to attend the New Jersey Devils training camp on September 18, 2021.

==== Europe ====
Following the conclusion of his contract with the Devils, Gauthier left the NHL as a free agent and signed his first contract abroad in agreeing to a one-year contract with Swiss club, HC Ajoie of the National League (NL), on August 2, 2022.

After two seasons in Switzerland with Ajoie, Gauthier left as a free agent and opted to sign a one-year deal with Russian club, Vityaz Moscow Region of the Kontinental Hockey League (KHL), on May 29, 2024. After one year with Vityaz, Gauthier returned to Ajoie. On September 5, 2025, the Swiss club announced Gauthier would be signing a deal through mid-November of that year with an option to extend through the end of the 2025-26 season. On November 11, 2025, the option was exercised.

== International play ==
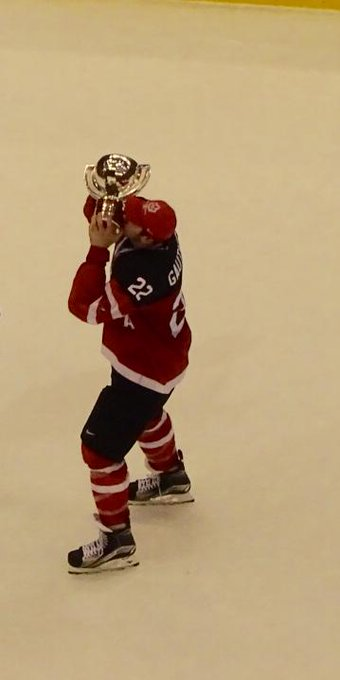
- Gauthier kissing the championship trophy at the 2015 IIHF U20 Worlds

Medal record

Representing Canada

Ice hockey

IIHF World U18 Championship
Gold medal – first place	2013 Russia	

IIHF World U20 Championship
Gold medal – first place	2015 Canada	

Following a successful season with the College Esther-Blondin Phenix midget AAA team, Gauthier was selected to play for Team Quebec at the Canadian Winter Games. He ended the tournament with one assist in six games.

On June 28, 2013, Gauthier was invited to the Canadian National Junior Team summer development camp. After making the roster, he was a member of the gold medal-winning Canadian team at the 2013 IIHF World U18 Championships. The following year, he was again invited to the Canadian National Junior Team summer development camp prior to the 2014 World Junior Ice Hockey Championships. After making the final roster, Team Canada lost in the semi-finals to Finland and failed to medal against Russia. While playing in six games, Gauthier recorded one assist and ended with a -2 Plus–minus.

On December 21, 2014, Gauthier was selected to compete for Team Canada during the 2015 World Junior Ice Hockey Championships. He played on a line with Lawson Crouse and Nick Ritchie during the tournament, as Team Canada won a gold medal.

== Career statistics ==
=== Regular season and playoffs ===
			Regular season					Playoffs
Season	Team	League	GP	G	A	Pts	PIM	GP	G	A	Pts	PIM
2012–13	Rimouski Océanic	QMJHL	62	22	38	60	26	6	0	2	2	2
2013–14	Rimouski Océanic	QMJHL	54	18	34	52	27	11	3	6	9	6
2014–15	Rimouski Océanic	QMJHL	37	16	16	32	21	20	2	14	16	4
2015–16	Toronto Marlies	AHL	56	6	12	18	10	9	0	0	0	4
2015–16	Toronto Maple Leafs	NHL	7	0	1	1	0	—	—	—	—	—
2016–17	Toronto Marlies	AHL	46	4	9	13	14	6	1	3	4	2
2016–17	Toronto Maple Leafs	NHL	21	2	1	3	23	—	—	—	—	—
2017–18	Toronto Maple Leafs	NHL	9	1	0	1	0	—	—	—	—	—
2017–18	Toronto Marlies	AHL	57	7	11	18	10	20	2	6	8	4
2018–19	Toronto Maple Leafs	NHL	70	3	11	14	12	7	0	0	0	2
2019–20	Toronto Maple Leafs	NHL	61	7	5	12	10	1	0	0	0	0
2020–21	Tucson Roadrunners	AHL	18	2	5	7	6	1	0	0	0	0
2020–21	Arizona Coyotes	NHL	2	0	0	0	2	—	—	—	—	—
2021–22	New Jersey Devils	NHL	8	0	0	0	0	—	—	—	—	—
2021–22	Utica Comets	AHL	51	8	24	32	15	—	—	—	—	—
2022–23	HC Ajoie	NL	52	9	14	23	32	—	—	—	—	—
2023–24	HC Ajoie	NL	44	10	8	18	18	—	—	—	—	—
2024–25	HC Vityaz	KHL	54	13	8	21	20	—	—	—	—	—
NHL totals			178	13	18	31	47	8	0	0	0	2

=== International ===
Year	Team	Event	Result	GP	G	A	Pts	PIM
2012	Canada Quebec	U17	6th	5	1	2	3	2
2013	Canada	U18	1st place, gold medalist(s)	7	1	3	4	2
2014	Canada	WJC	4th	7	0	1	1	2
2015	Canada	WJC	1st place, gold medalist(s)	7	0	1	1	0
Junior totals				26	2	7	9	6

== Awards and honours ==
Award	Year	Ref
QMJHL
CHL Top Prospects Game	2013	
Guy Carbonneau Trophy	2015	
AHL
Calder Cup (Toronto Marlies)	2018	
International
IIHF World U18 Championship Gold Medal (Team Canada)	2013	
IIHF World U20 Championships – Gold Medal	2015	

Awards and achievements
Preceded by Morgan Rielly	Toronto Maple Leafs first-round draft pick 2013	Succeeded by William Nylander
