= Carter Ashton =

Canadian ice hockey player (born 1991)

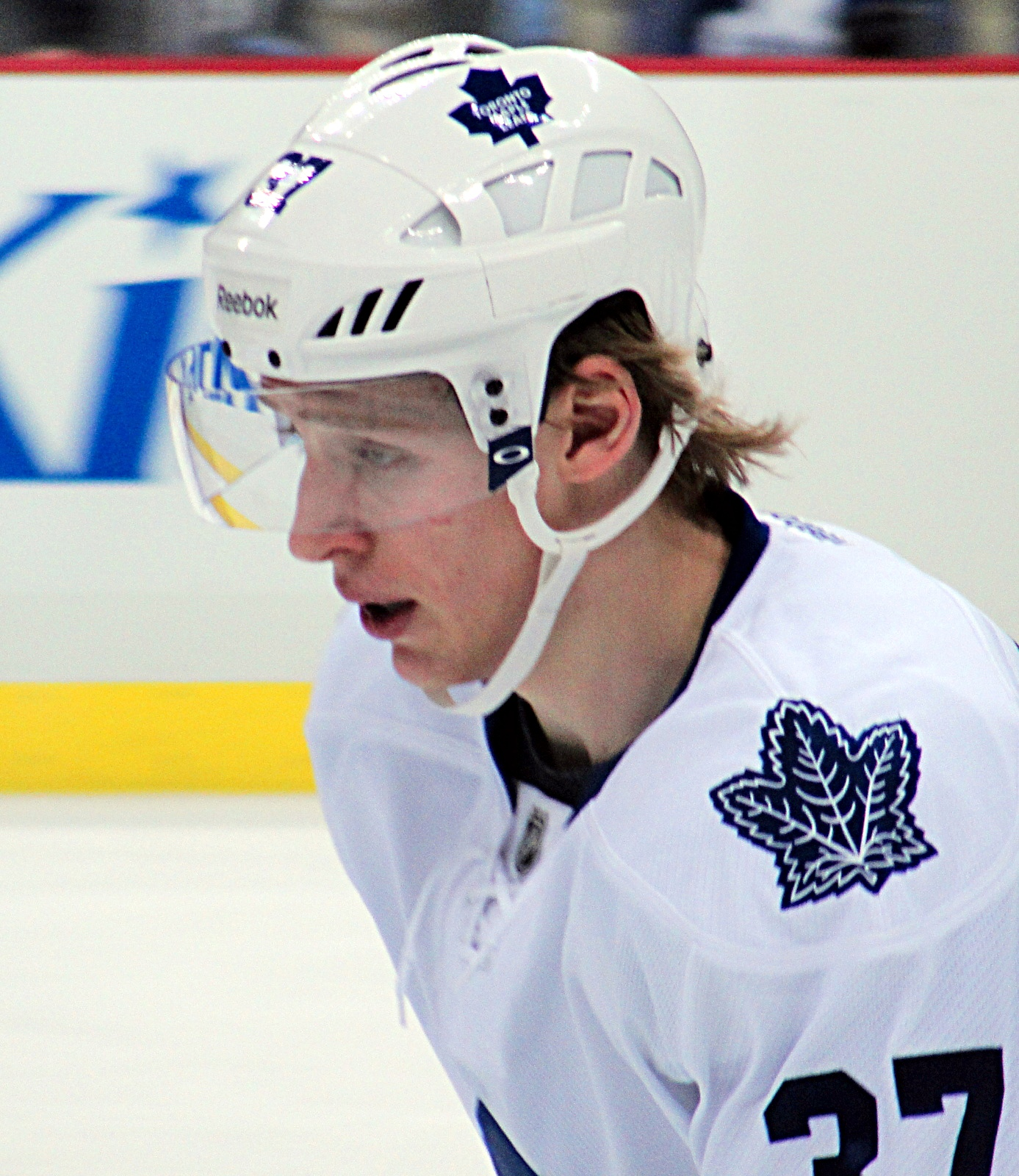
- Ashton with the Toronto Maple Leafs in 2012
- Born: April 1, 1991 (age 35) Winnipeg, Manitoba, Canada
- Height: 6 ft 3 in (191 cm)
- Weight: 215 lb (98 kg; 15 st 5 lb)
- Position: Right wing
- Shoots: Left
- SHL team Former teams: Rögle BK; Toronto Maple Leafs; Torpedo Nizhny Novgorod; Lada Togliatti; Severstal Cherepovets; Dinamo Riga; Leksands IF
- NHL draft: 29th overall, 2009; Tampa Bay Lightning
- Playing career: 2009–present

Carter Ashton (born April 1, 1991) is a Canadian professional ice hockey player currently playing for Södertälje SK of the HockeyAllsvenskan . Ashton was drafted 29th overall by the Tampa Bay Lightning in the 2009 NHL entry draft. He was born in Winnipeg, Manitoba, but grew up in Saskatoon, Saskatchewan.

== Playing career ==
=== Junior ===
Ashton was drafted by the Lethbridge Hurricanes of the Western Hockey League (WHL) in the first round, seventh overall, in the 2006 WHL bantam draft. He appeared in two games with the Hurricanes in the 2006–07 season, earning no points. Ashton's rookie season in the WHL was in 2007–08. He played only 40 games, missing significant time due to injury. During the WHL playoffs that season, Ashton helped the Hurricanes reach the finals of the WHL playoffs.

Ashton had a breakout season in 2008–09, appearing in 70 games with the Hurricanes and scoring a team-high 30 goals while adding 20 assists for 50 points, which was the fourth-highest total on the club. In the post-season, Ashton appeared in 11 games, earning three points. During the 2008–09 season, Ashton played for Team Cherry in the CHL Top Prospects Game. After the season, Ashton was selected 29th overall by the Tampa Bay Lightning in the 2009 NHL entry draft. He attended training camp with the Lightning and the team signed him to an entry-level contract on October 2, 2009.

Ashton began the 2009–10 season with the Hurricanes, and after recording 13 goals and 26 points in 28 games, the Hurricanes traded him to the Regina Pats. With Regina, Ashton had 11 goals and 25 points in 37 games, as the Pats failed to qualify for the playoffs. On December 10, 2010, Ashton was traded to the Tri-City Americans.

=== Professional ===
In the 2011–12 season, on February 27, 2012, Ashton was traded from the Tampa Bay Lightning to the Toronto Maple Leafs in exchange for defenceman Keith Aulie. Ten days later, on March 7, 2012, Ashton made his debut with the Maple Leafs and played in his first NHL game in a 3–2 loss to the Pittsburgh Penguins. He played 15 games with the Leafs in his first season and 32 games in the 2013–14 season registering 3 points. He also played 24 games registering 23 points with the Leafs' American Hockey League affiliate Toronto Marlies. He was re-signed to a one-year two-way contract worth $850,000 in July 2014.

On November 6, 2014, Ashton was suspended for 20 games, without pay, for violating the terms of the NHL/NHLPA Performance Enhancing Substances Program. Ashton claimed to have unknowingly ingested a banned substance while using an un-prescribed inhaler for exercise-induced asthma. The suspension came with a mandatory referral to the NHL/NHLPA Program for Substance Abuse and Behavioral Health for evaluation and possible treatment. At the time, he had played in three games for the Maple Leafs and did not register a point. He had also played in 24 games for the Marlies and accumulated 23 points. On February 6, 2015, Ashton was traded from the Maple Leafs back to Tampa Bay in a deal that included David Broll and a conditional seventh-round draft pick in 2016 entry draft from the Lightning.

On July 21, 2015, as a restricted free agent from the Lightning, Ashton signed with the Russian club Torpedo Nizhny Novgorod of the Kontinental Hockey League (KHL). After two seasons with Torpedo and having established himself in the KHL, Ashton moved to fellow KHL club, HC Lada Togliatti, in a trade for the final year of his contract on June 2, 2017. At the completion of the 2017–18 season, Ashton left Lada as a free agent, signing a two-year contract with his third KHL club, Severstal Cherepovets on June 15, 2018.

Ashton played four seasons with Leksands IF in the Swedish Hockey League from 2020 to 2024 and then on October 21, 2024, he signed a one-year contract with Rögle BK in the same league. After recording eight points in 22 games with Rögle, Ashton suffered a season-ending injury on January 28, 2025.

== International play ==
Medal record

Representing Canada

Ice hockey

World Junior Championships
Silver medal – second place	2011 United States	

Ashton played for Team Saskatchewan at the 2007 Canada Winter Games which were held in Whitehorse, Yukon. He also played for Team West at the 2007 World U-17 Hockey Challenge, where he served as an alternate captain on the team that won the bronze medal.

After his rookie season in the WHL, Ashton played for Team Canada at the 2008 Ivan Hlinka Memorial Tournament, helping the team to a gold medal. Ashton finished the tournament with one goal and two assists in four games, including a goal in the gold medal win against Russia.

He was later invited to take part in Canada's 2011 national junior team selection camp Carter played for Team Canada at the 2011 World Junior Ice Hockey Championships held in Buffalo, New York. He finished with one goal and two assists as Canada won the silver medal.

== Personal life ==
Ashton's father, Brent, played in 998 NHL games in a career that spanned from 1979 to 1993. His father held the record for the most traded player in NHL history until the record was tied by Mike Sillinger. Carter was born in Winnipeg during his father's stint with the Jets. Ashton has one older brother, Taylor.

Carter is close friends with Luke and Brayden Schenn, Jared Cowen and Jimmy Bubnick from their minor hockey days in Saskatoon.

== Career statistics ==
=== Regular season and playoffs ===
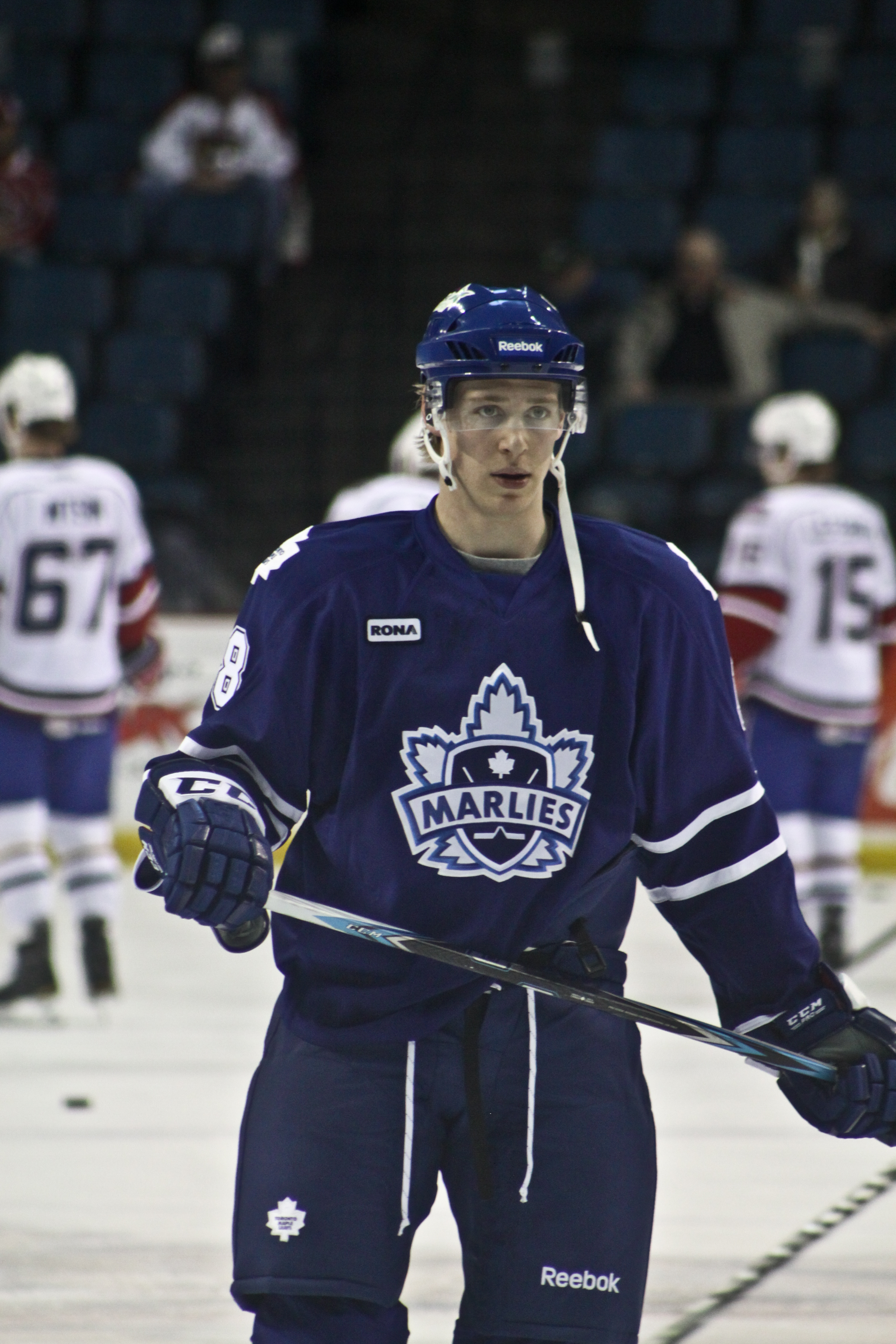
Carter Ashton warming up in his first AHL game with the Toronto Marlies

			Regular season					Playoffs
Season	Team	League	GP	G	A	Pts	PIM	GP	G	A	Pts	PIM
2006–07	Saskatoon Contacts AAA	SMHL	41	28	38	66	99	3	3	5	8	6
2006–07	Lethbridge Hurricanes	WHL	2	0	0	0	0	—	—	—	—	—
2007–08	Lethbridge Hurricanes	WHL	40	5	4	9	21	19	0	1	1	12
2008–09	Lethbridge Hurricanes	WHL	70	30	20	50	93	11	1	2	3	15
2009–10	Lethbridge Hurricanes	WHL	28	13	13	26	52	—	—	—	—	—
2009–10	Regina Pats	WHL	37	11	14	25	57	—	—	—	—	—
2009–10	Norfolk Admirals	AHL	11	1	0	1	6	—	—	—	—	—
2010–11	Regina Pats	WHL	29	16	11	27	44	—	—	—	—	—
2010–11	Tri-City Americans	WHL	33	17	27	44	62	10	3	5	8	4
2010–11	Norfolk Admirals	AHL	—	—	—	—	—	2	0	0	0	0
2011–12	Norfolk Admirals	AHL	56	19	16	35	58	—	—	—	—	—
2011–12	Toronto Marlies	AHL	7	2	1	3	8	6	1	2	3	8
2011–12	Toronto Maple Leafs	NHL	15	0	0	0	13	—	—	—	—	—
2012–13	Toronto Marlies	AHL	53	11	8	19	67	9	3	2	5	4
2013–14	Toronto Marlies	AHL	24	16	7	23	30	12	4	5	9	16
2013–14	Toronto Maple Leafs	NHL	32	0	3	3	19	—	—	—	—	—
2014–15	Toronto Maple Leafs	NHL	7	0	0	0	0	—	—	—	—	—
2014–15	Toronto Marlies	AHL	12	4	4	8	8	—	—	—	—	—
2014–15	Syracuse Crunch	AHL	29	3	11	14	61	3	0	0	0	7
2015–16	Torpedo Nizhny Novgorod	KHL	46	13	10	23	61	9	0	0	0	33
2016–17	Torpedo Nizhny Novgorod	KHL	59	18	10	28	48	5	0	0	0	4
2017–18	Lada Togliatti	KHL	6	2	1	3	4	—	—	—	—	—
2018–19	Severstal Cherepovets	KHL	36	9	5	14	26	—	—	—	—	—
2019–20	Dinamo Riga	KHL	62	15	10	25	39	—	—	—	—	—
2020–21	Leksands IF	SHL	24	13	6	19	16	4	1	0	1	0
2021–22	Leksands IF	SHL	52	7	15	22	18	3	0	0	0	0
2022–23	Leksands IF	SHL	37	5	6	11	26	3	0	0	0	4
2023-24	Leksands IF	SHL	26	4	4	8	6	6	0	1	1	4
NHL totals			54	0	3	3	32	—	—	—	—	—
KHL totals			209	57	36	93	178	14	0	0	0	42
SHL totals			139	29	31	60	66	16	1	1	2	8

=== International ===
Year	Team	Event	Result	GP	G	A	Pts	PIM
2008	Canada Western	U17	3rd place, bronze medalist(s)	6	1	5	6	2
2009	Canada	IH18	1st place, gold medalist(s)	4	1	2	3	0
2011	Canada	WJC	2nd place, silver medalist(s)	7	1	2	3	6
Junior totals				17	3	9	12	8

== Awards and honours ==
Award	Year
WHL
CHL Top Prospects Game	2009
AHL
Reebok/AHL Player of the Week (October 2–9)	2011
Reebok/AHL Rookie of the Month (November)	2011

Awards and achievements
Preceded by Victor Hedman	Tampa Bay Lightning first-round draft pick 2009	Succeeded by Brett Connolly
