= David Broll =

Canadian ice hockey player (born 1993)

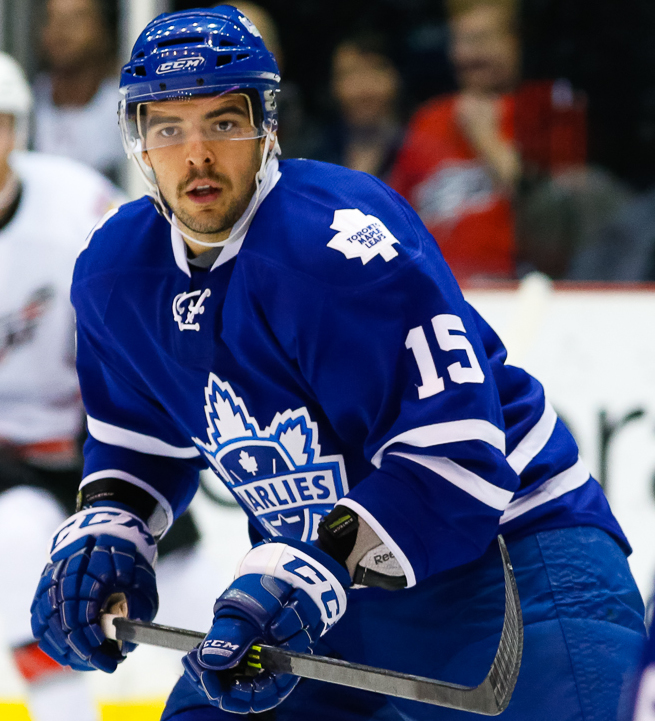
- Broll with the Toronto Marlies in 2013
- Born: January 4, 1993 (age 33) Mississauga, Ontario, Canada
- Height: 6 ft 2 in (188 cm)
- Weight: 216 lb (98 kg; 15 st 6 lb)
- Position: Left wing
- Shot: Left
- Played for: Toronto Maple Leafs; Toronto Marlies; Orlando Solar Bears; Syracuse Crunch; St John's IceCaps; Laval Rocket; Providence Bruins; Jacksonville Icemen; Indy Fuel; Greenville Swamp Rabbits; Coventry Blaze
- NHL draft: 152nd overall, 2011; Toronto Maple Leafs
- Playing career: 2012–2022

David Broll (born January 4, 1993) is a retired Canadian professional ice hockey player. He last played with the Coventry Blaze in the EIHL. Broll was selected by the Toronto Maple Leafs in the sixth round (152nd overall) of the 2011 NHL entry draft.

== Playing career ==
Broll played four seasons (2009–2013) of major junior hockey in the Ontario Hockey League (OHL), scoring 47 goals and 92 assists for 139 points, while earning 285 penalty minutes, in 255 games played with the Erie Otters and Sault Ste. Marie Greyhounds. He was selected by the Toronto Maple Leafs 152nd overall in the 2011 NHL entry draft.

The Maple Leafs signed Broll to an entry-level contract on July 31, 2011. He was assigned to the Maple Leafs's American Hockey League (AHL) affiliate, the Toronto Marlies. Broll was recalled by the Maple Leafs at the beginning of the 2013–14 season after an injury to Joffrey Lupul forced them to make line changes and on October 10, 2013, he made his NHL debut skating with the Maple Leafs in a 4–0 victory over the Nashville Predators. He played in five games with Leafs before being sent down to the Marlies. In the 2014–15 season, Broll was assigned to the Toronto Marlies out of training camp. After 21 scoreless games with the Marlies, Broll was assigned to ECHL affiliate the Orlando Solar Bears on December 8, 2014. He played in 16 games with the Solar Bears, scoring two goals and 9 points. He was named to the ECHL All-Star Game roster for his time in Orlando. While with the Solar Bears, Broll was traded by the Maple Leafs along with Carter Ashton to the Tampa Bay Lightning in exchange for a conditional seventh-round pick in the 2016 NHL entry draft on February 6, 2015. He was assigned to the Lightning's AHL affiliate, the Syracuse Crunch. He had 8 points in 60 games with the Crunch.

As a free agent from the Lightning following the conclusion of his entry-level deal, Broll was unable to attain another NHL deal. On September 21, 2016, he signed a professional try-out contract to attend the Montreal Canadiens training camp. He was later signed to a one-year contract with ECHL affiliate, the Brampton Beast on September 27, 2016. Before playing a game with the Beast, Broll was signed to a professional try-out contract to begin the 2016–17 season with the Canadiens AHL affiliate, the St. John's IceCaps. After 43 games with the IceCaps, Broll signed to a one-year contract extension through the 2017–18 season on February 16, 2017. For the 2017–18 season, the Canadiens moved their AHL affiliate from St. John's to Laval, renaming the team the Laval Rocket. At the end of his contract, Broll was released and signed a professional try-out contract with the Providence Bruins of the AHL ahead of the 2018–19 season. He made the team out of camp, but spent part of the season with the Jacksonville Icemen of the ECHL.

On June 18, 2019, Broll opted to sign his first contract abroad, agreeing to a one-year contract with English club, Coventry Blaze of the Elite Ice Hockey League. He collected 18 points in 35 regular season games with the Blaze and served as an alternate captain. Having returned to North America during the COVID-19 pandemic, Broll opted to return to the ECHL, agreeing to a contract with the Indy Fuel on October 1, 2020. Posting 10 points through 28 games with the Fuel in March 2021, Broll was traded to fellow ECHL side, the Greenville Swamp Rabbits. In August 2021, Broll returned to Coventry ahead of the 2021–22 season. He retired from hockey in January 2022 to pursue a career as a firefighter in his native Ontario.

== Career statistics ==
=== Regular season and playoffs ===
			Regular season					Playoffs
Season	Team	League	GP	G	A	Pts	PIM	GP	G	A	Pts	PIM
2009–10	Erie Otters	OHL	64	9	9	18	42	4	0	0	0	2
2010–11	Erie Otters	OHL	41	8	14	22	51	—	—	—	—	—
2010–11	Sault Ste. Marie Greyhounds	OHL	24	5	7	12	34	—	—	—	—	—
2011–12	Sault Ste. Marie Greyhounds	OHL	59	8	25	33	81	—	—	—	—	—
2011–12	Toronto Marlies	AHL	3	0	0	0	5	2	0	0	0	0
2012–13	Sault Ste. Marie Greyhounds	OHL	67	17	37	54	77	6	0	2	2	21
2012–13	Toronto Marlies	AHL	7	0	0	0	15	3	0	0	0	2
2013–14	Toronto Marlies	AHL	63	3	13	16	120	4	0	0	0	6
2013–14	Toronto Maple Leafs	NHL	5	0	1	1	5	—	—	—	—	—
2014–15	Toronto Marlies	AHL	21	0	0	0	79	—	—	—	—	—
2014–15	Orlando Solar Bears	ECHL	16	2	7	9	9	—	—	—	—	—
2014–15	Syracuse Crunch	AHL	20	0	3	3	40	2	0	0	0	2
2015–16	Syracuse Crunch	AHL	60	2	6	8	112	—	—	—	—	—
2016–17	St. John's IceCaps	AHL	54	5	3	8	115	—	—	—	—	—
2017–18	Laval Rocket	AHL	45	3	1	4	99	—	—	—	—	—
2018–19	Providence Bruins	AHL	1	0	0	0	7	—	—	—	—	—
2018–19	Jacksonville Icemen	ECHL	29	6	7	13	10	—	—	—	—	—
2019–20	Coventry Blaze	EIHL	35	9	9	18	94	—	—	—	—	—
2020–21	Indy Fuel	ECHL	28	2	8	10	27	—	—	—	—	—
2020–21	Greenville Swamp Rabbits	ECHL	12	1	4	5	4	4	1	0	1	2
2021–22	Coventry Blaze	EIHL	5	0	3	3	14	—	—	—	—	—
NHL totals			5	0	1	1	5	—	—	—	—	—

=== International ===
Year	Team	Event	Result	GP	G	A	Pts	PIM
2010	Canada Ontario	U17	2nd place, silver medalist(s)	6	0	2	2	14
Junior totals				6	0	2	2	14
