= Paul Ranger =

Canadian ice hockey player (born 1984)

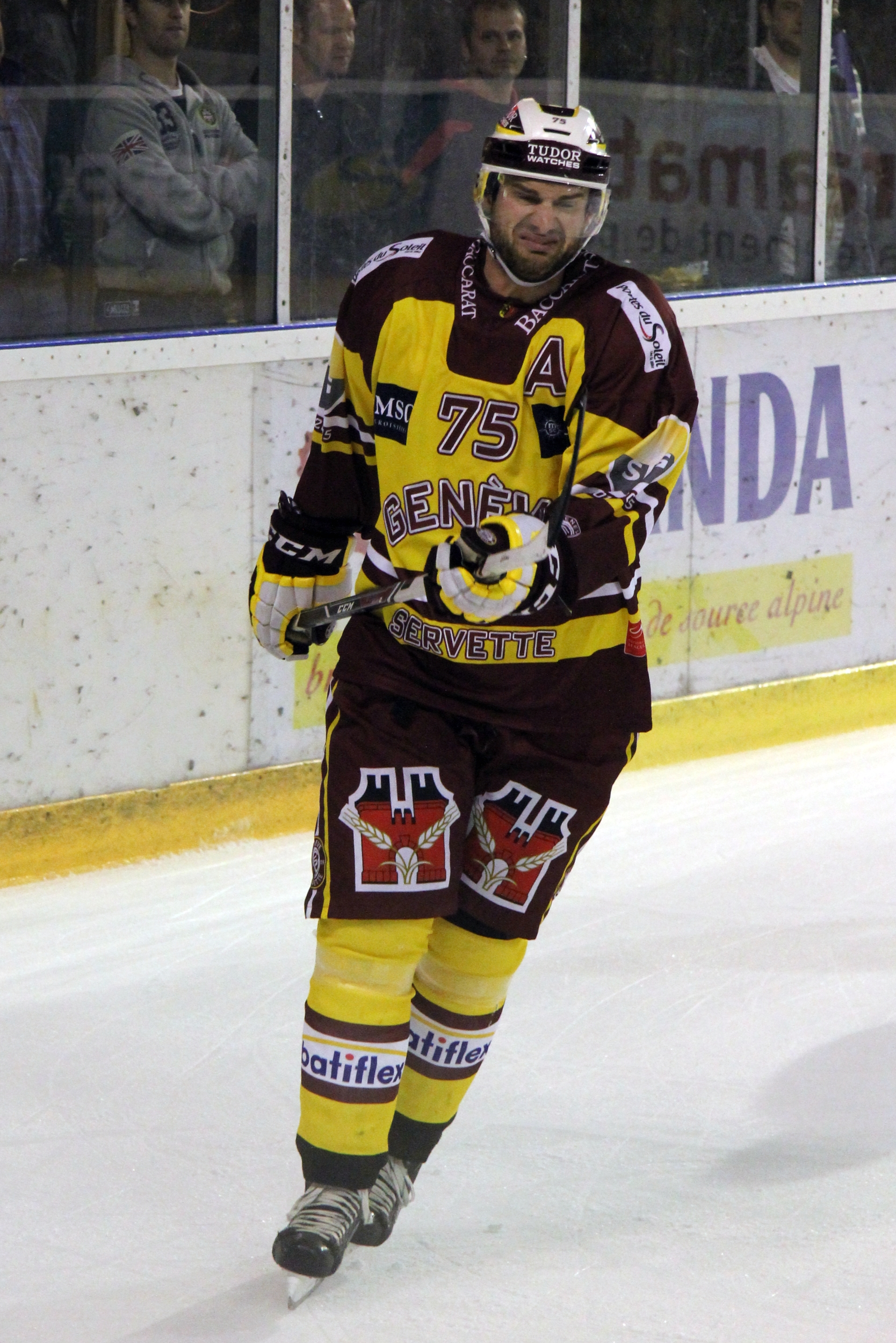
- Ranger with Genève-Servette HC in 2014
- Born: September 12, 1984 (age 41) Whitby, Ontario, Canada
- Height: 6 ft 3 in (191 cm)
- Weight: 210 lb (95 kg; 15 st 0 lb)
- Position: Defence
- Shot: Left
- Played for: Tampa Bay Lightning; Toronto Maple Leafs; Genève-Servette HC; Kloten Flyers
- NHL draft: 183rd overall, 2002; Tampa Bay Lightning
- Playing career: 2004–2015

Paul D. Ranger (born September 12, 1984) is a Canadian former professional ice hockey defenceman. He most recently served as an assistant coach for the Ontario Tech University of the U Sports. He spent the majority of his playing career with the Tampa Bay Lightning of the National Hockey League (NHL) before leaving the sport at the professional level for almost three years due to severe depression. Ranger returned to professional ice hockey at the American Hockey League (AHL) with the Toronto Marlies during the 2012–13 season, and subsequently signed a one-year contract with the Toronto Maple Leafs on July 24, 2013, to return to the NHL.

== Playing career ==
Ranger played his junior career with the Oshawa Generals of the Ontario Hockey League (OHL). After being drafted 183rd overall in the 2002 NHL entry draft by the Tampa Bay Lightning, he played two more seasons with the Generals before signing with the Springfield Falcons of the American Hockey League (AHL) during the 2004–05 NHL lockout. After the lockout, he played 76 games with the Lightning, recording 18 points.

In October 2009, Ranger approached Lightning team personnel before practice and requested a leave of absence without pay, which the team agreed to. During his time away from playing, he attended the University of Ottawa and helped coach bantam ice hockey in his hometown, with help from David Branch, commissioner of the OHL.

On August 21, 2012, after almost three seasons after last playing at professional level, Ranger signed a minor league deal with the Toronto Marlies of the AHL. His agent approached the team to inquire about his return to the NHL. Even after his return, Ranger has declined to talk about the specific details about why he chose to return to professional ice hockey. After a successful return to playing with the Marlies, Ranger signed with the Toronto Maple Leafs for the 2013–14 season.

On July 17, 2014, after a single season with the Maple Leafs, Ranger opted to continue his career abroad, signing a two-year contract to help solidify the defence of Genève-Servette HC in the Swiss National League A. He played only 23 games in his first season with the team and was a healthy scratch for most of the 2014–15 season before being loaned to the Kloten Flyers for four games on January 2, 2015.

In 2018, he was the subject of "The Mystery of Paul Ranger", a documentary feature on TSN. The segment's creators, Matt Dorman, Darren Dreger, James Judges, Nigel Akam, Kevin Fallis and Darren Oliver, received a Canadian Screen Award nomination for Best Sports Feature Segment at the 7th Canadian Screen Awards.

== Career statistics ==
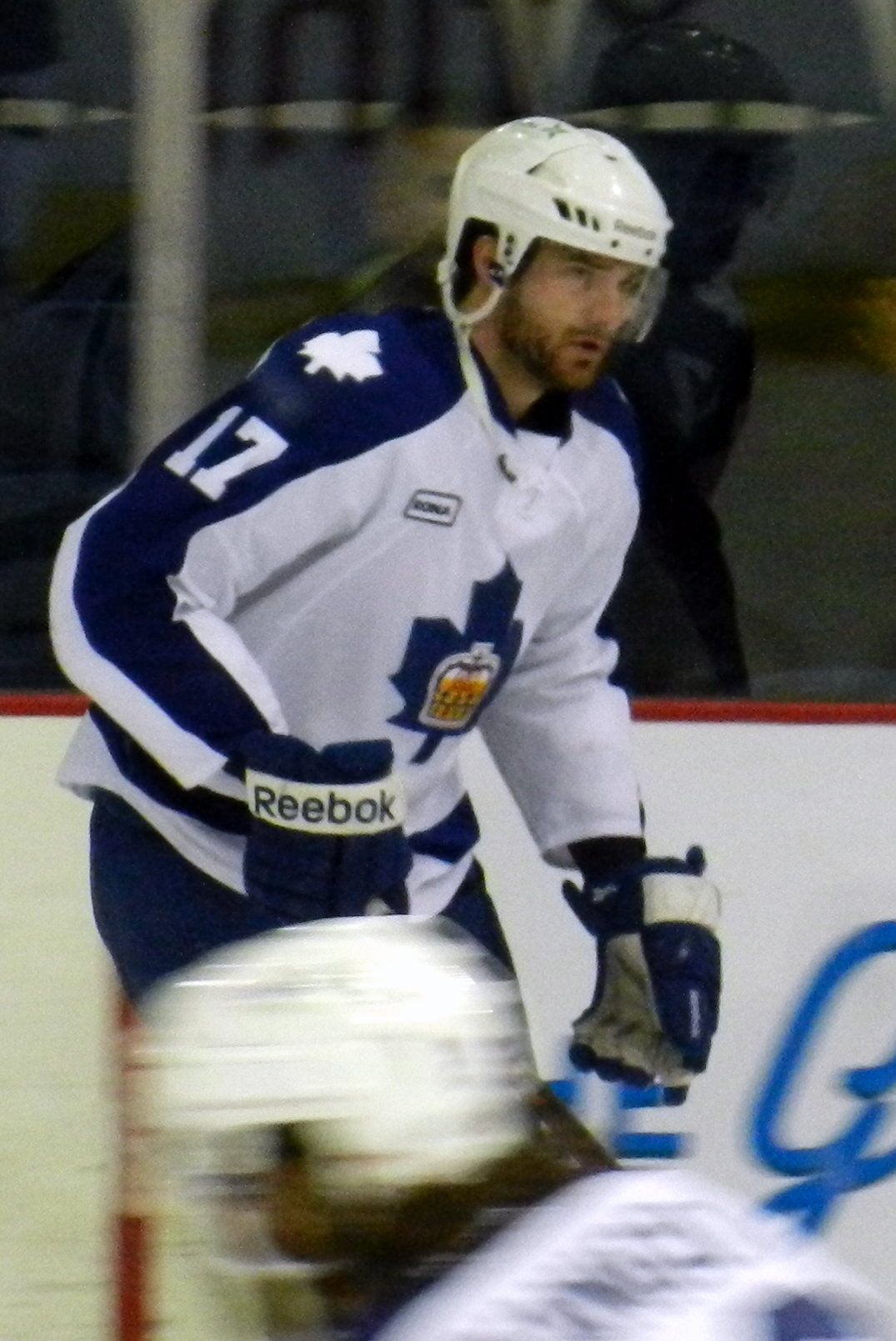
Ranger with the Toronto Marlies.

| | | | Regular season | | | | | Playoffs |
| Season | Team | League | GP | G | A | Pts | PIM | GP | G | A | Pts | PIM |
|---|---|---|---|---|---|---|---|---|---|---|---|---|
| 2000–01 | Oshawa Generals | OHL | 32 | 0 | 1 | 1 | 2 | — | — | — | — | — |
| 2001–02 | Oshawa Generals | OHL | 62 | 0 | 9 | 9 | 49 | 5 | 0 | 0 | 0 | 4 |
| 2002–03 | Oshawa Generals | OHL | 68 | 10 | 28 | 38 | 70 | 13 | 0 | 3 | 3 | 10 |
| 2003–04 | Oshawa Generals | OHL | 62 | 12 | 31 | 43 | 72 | 7 | 0 | 1 | 1 | 10 |
| 2004–05 | Springfield Falcons | AHL | 69 | 3 | 8 | 11 | 46 | — | — | — | — | — |
| 2005–06 | Springfield Falcons | AHL | 1 | 1 | 2 | 3 | 0 | — | — | — | — | — |
| 2005–06 | Tampa Bay Lightning | NHL | 76 | 1 | 17 | 18 | 58 | 5 | 2 | 4 | 6 | 0 |
| 2006–07 | Tampa Bay Lightning | NHL | 72 | 4 | 24 | 28 | 42 | 6 | 0 | 1 | 1 | 4 |
| 2007–08 | Tampa Bay Lightning | NHL | 72 | 10 | 21 | 31 | 56 | — | — | — | — | — |
| 2008–09 | Tampa Bay Lightning | NHL | 42 | 2 | 11 | 13 | 56 | — | — | — | — | — |
| 2009–10 | Tampa Bay Lightning | NHL | 8 | 1 | 1 | 2 | 6 | — | — | — | — | — |
| 2012–13 | Toronto Marlies | AHL | 51 | 8 | 17 | 25 | 54 | 9 | 2 | 2 | 4 | 14 |
| 2013–14 | Toronto Maple Leafs | NHL | 53 | 6 | 8 | 14 | 36 | — | — | — | — | — |
| 2014–15 | Genève–Servette HC | NLA | 23 | 1 | 3 | 4 | 16 | — | — | — | — | — |
| 2014–15 | Kloten Flyers | NLA | 4 | 1 | 1 | 2 | 2 | — | — | — | — | — |
| AHL totals | | | 121 | 12 | 27 | 39 | 100 | 9 | 2 | 2 | 4 | 14 |
| NHL totals | | | 323 | 24 | 82 | 106 | 254 | 11 | 2 | 5 | 7 | 4 |
