= 1957 Memorial Cup =

1957 Canadian junior ice hockey championship

The Memorial Cup trophy

The 1957 Memorial Cup final was the 39th junior ice hockey championship of the Canadian Amateur Hockey Association (CAHA). The Flin Flon Bombers won their first Memorial Cup championship by defeating the Ottawa Junior Canadiens four games to three in a best-of-seven final series held at the Whitney Forum and the Regina Exhibition Stadium. CAHA second vice-president Gordon Juckes oversaw the scheduling and discipline for the national playoffs.

== Western Canada playoffs ==
Prior to the playoffs, the Manitoba Junior Hockey League (MJHL) requested permission for its champion to be allowed three additional players on its roster if the team reached the Western Canada final. When the request was approved by a vote of Canadian Amateur Hockey Association (CAHA) branch presidents, the Flin Flon Bombers and the Saskatchewan Junior Hockey League (SJHL) objected despite a ruling by CAHA president Jimmy Dunn that the decision was made according to the CAHA constitution.

The Winnipeg Tribune reported that the decision had "started the old country-city mud-slinging campaign". Flin Flon Daily Miner editor Harry Miles wrote that, "Jimmy Dunn in Winnipeg [was] shovelling new players into the Winnipeg junior club with reckless abandon", and implied that Winnipeg had long dominated amateur sports in Manitoba and that the decisions of various sports associations made it more difficult for Flin Flon to compete. When supporters of the Bombers hanged Dunn in effigy, he responded by saying "All I hope is that the effigy looked like me. I'd hate to think they had hanged somebody else by mistake".

The Bombers defeated the Edmonton Oil Kings four wins to two in their best-of-seven semifinal series, and the Fort William Canadians defeated the Winnipeg Monarchs four wins to three with one tied game in the other semifinal. The SJHL requested permission for the Bombers to add players to its roster for the Western Canada final which was declined in a vote by CAHA branch presidents. In the best-of-seven final, the Bombers defeated the Canadians in four consecutive games to capture the Abbott Cup as champions of Western Canada and advance to the Memorial Cup final.

== Eastern Canada playoffs ==
The Ottawa Junior Canadiens participated in the Eastern Canada junior playoffs as an independent team which played exhibition games instead of scheduled league games. The Junior Canadiens won the first two games of the semifinal series by scores of 9–3 and 14–0 over the Ottawa Shamrocks, and the best-of-five series was aborted. In the Eastern Canada final, the Junior Canadiens defeated the Guelph Biltmores with four wins and a tie in a best-of-seven series to capture the George Richardson Memorial Trophy and advance to the Memorial Cup final.

== Memorial Cup final ==
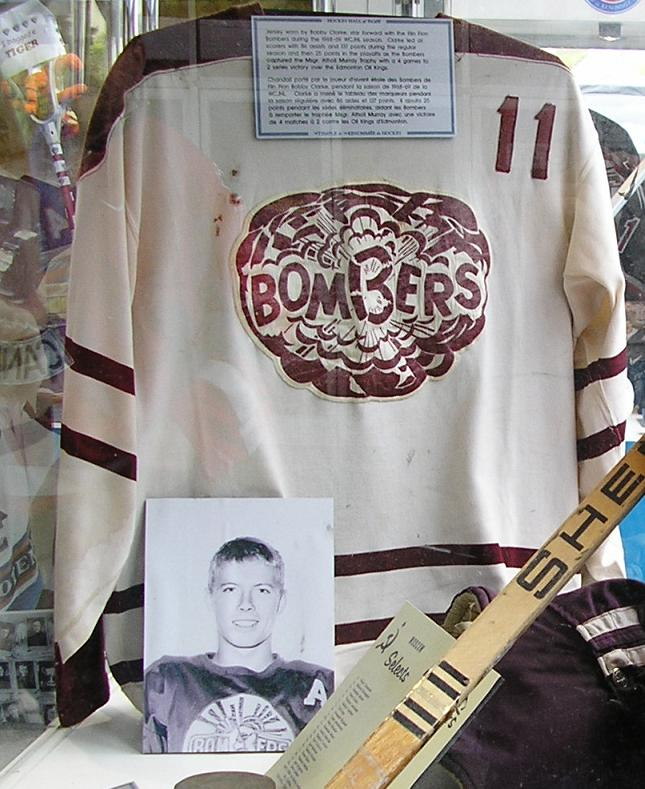
Flin Flon Bombers jersey c. 1967

The Junior Canadiens arrived late for the first scheduled match in the best-of-seven final series. Ottawa's coach Sam Pollock stated that the CAHA advised the team to fly to Winnipeg, despite that flying was against team policy. The team was further delayed after the first two attempts for a charter from Winnipeg to Flin Flon both failed, and the third attempt was not available until a day later. CAHA second vice-president Gordon Juckes oversaw the playoffs and admitted that mistakes were made in planning transportation.

Pollock criticized the CAHA for scheduling games in Flin Flon, which he felt gave the Bombers an unfair advantage as opposed to playing at a neutral location. He was also critical of the hospitality and amenities in the town which upset the local community. Bombers' president Jimmy Wardle responded by saying, "Flin Flon citizens are up in arms over criticism levelled at the town and its facilities by Ottawa [Junior Canadiens] officials who do not recognize, apparently, any part of Canada west of Ottawa".

Pollock was ejected from game five for excessive vocal criticism on the on-ice officials during the second period, and later said that Flin Flon "can't win it honestly with that type of refereeing". Ernie Fedoruk wrote in the Regina Leader-Post that Pollock had "questioned the ancestry of the referees". The CAHA felt that Pollock's comments had a detrimental effect on the on-ice officials, and warned him that he would be suspended for any repeat incident.

The Bombers became the first team from Western Canada since 1948 to win the Memorial Cup, when they defeated the Junior Canadiens by a 3–2 score in the seventh game. The Bombers were welcomed at the train station in Flin Flon by an estimated 4,000 cheering fans, the Hudbay Pipe Band, the Flin Flon School Band, and the local Navy League Cadet Corps drum and bugle band.

At the 1957 CAHA general meeting, delegates agreed to recommendations to prevent a repeat of mistakes and verbal outbursts by team officials. Motions were approved to have written policies for choosing the location of the finals, the methods of travel used by the teams, and for disciplinary sanctions.

=== Scores ===
Game-by-game scores:

- Game 1: Flin Flon 3–1 Ottawa (in Flin Flon)
- Game 2: Ottawa 4–3 Flin Flon (in Flin Flon)
- Game 3: Ottawa 5–2 Flin Flon (in Flin Flon)
- Game 4: Flin Flon 3–1 Ottawa (in Regina)
- Game 5: Flin Flon 3–2 Ottawa (in Regina)
- Game 6: Ottawa 4–2 Flin Flon (in Regina)
- Game 7: Flin Flon 3–2 Ottawa (in Regina)

=== Winning roster ===
Flin Flon Bombers roster:

Coach: Bobby Kirk

Players: Barry Beatty, Jean Gauthier, Patty Ginnell, Harvey Fleming, Carl Forster, Ted Hampson, Ron Hutchinson, Mike Kardash, George Konik, Orland Kurtenbach, Rod Lee, Cliff Lennartz, Mel Pearson, Duane Rupp, Ken Wiley, George Wood
