= Flin Flon Bombers =

Manitoba junior ice hockey team founded 1927

- City: Flin Flon, Manitoba, Canada
- League: SJHL
- Division: Sherwood Division
- Founded: 1927
- Home arena: Whitney Forum
- Colours: Maroon and White
- General manager: Cole McCaig
- Head coach: Cole McCaig
- Website: http://www.bombers.ca

Franchise history
- 1978–1984: Flin Flon Bombers
- 1984–1986: Creighton Bombers
- 1986–present: Flin Flon Bombers

Previous franchise history
- 1927–1978: Flin Flon Bombers
- 1978–1979: Edmonton Oil Kings
- 1979–1980: Great Falls Americans
- 1980–1982: Spokane Flyers

The Flin Flon Bombers are a Canadian junior ice hockey team in Flin Flon, a city located on the Manitoba–Saskatchewan provincial border. The Bombers are members of the Saskatchewan Junior Hockey League (SJHL), which is a member of the Canadian Junior Hockey League, and they play home games at the Whitney Forum on the Manitoba side of the city. The team's history dates back to 1927 and includes a decade-long run in the major junior Western Hockey League in the late 1960s and 1970s. The team has won two national championships, including the 1957 Memorial Cup and the 1969 James Piggott National Championship, and has a tradition of throwing a moose leg onto the ice after every home-game win.

== History ==
=== Early years ===
The Bombers date back to 1927. Their trademark colours are maroon and white. The team originally played at the Flin Flon Community Club Arena until the construction of the Whitney Forum, known locally as "the zoo", in 1958. The Bombers originated as a senior team, competing in the Northern Saskatchewan Senior Hockey League and the Saskatchewan Senior Hockey League between 1937 and 1948.

=== SJHL dynasty ===
In the postwar period, the Bombers became charter members of the Saskatchewan Junior Hockey League (SJHL). The team quickly established a dynasty, winning seven league titles in a nine-year span between 1952 and 1960. The team's biggest success during this period came in the 1956–57 season. The Bombers lost only five games in the regular season. In the playoffs, the Bombers beat the Humboldt Indians four games to none in the semifinals, then won the final over the Prince Albert Mintos four games to two. As SJHL champions, the Bombers then advanced to the Abbott Cup to determine the champion for Western Canada. They defeated the Edmonton Oil Kings, a team of junior-aged players competing in the senior Central Alberta Hockey League, four games to two, then the Thunder Bay Junior A Hockey League's Fort William Canadiens in four games to win the Abbott Cup and advance to the Memorial Cup national tournament.

As per Memorial Cup rules, the Bombers were permitted to add three players to their roster for the 1957 national playoffs, picking up goalie Lynn Davis and defenceman Jean Gauthier from the Fort William Canadiens and centre Orland Kurtenbach from Prince Albert Mintos. There, they faced the Eastern Canadian champion Ottawa Canadiens, coached by Sam Pollock and assistant Scotty Bowman. The first three games were in Flin Flon, with the remaining games played in Regina, Saskatchewan with Pollock drawing the ire of Flin Flon residents for criticizing the remoteness and size of the community. The Bombers won the series four games to three to claim the Memorial Cup championship. The win by the Bombers was considered a considerable upset over the favoured Canadiens. The team was greeted by 4,000 people when they returned to Flin Flon after the series.

The 1956–57 Bombers were inducted into both the Manitoba Sports Hall of Fame (1999) and the Saskatchewan Sports Hall of Fame (2009), as well as the Manitoba Hockey Hall of Fame.

The Bombers played in the SJHL until 1966, when the launch of the Canadian Major Junior Hockey League (CMJHL) led the SJHL to fold with several of its teams joining the new league. The Bombers spent the 1966–67 season in the Manitoba Junior Hockey League (MJHL) instead. Led by coach Paddy Ginnell and star players Reggie Leach and Bobby Clarke, who won the league scoring title, the Bombers dominated the MJHL and won the Turnbull Cup as league champions, before losing the Abbott Cup final to Port Arthur. Clarke recorded 71 goals and 183 points in 45 games, while Leach recorded 67 goals and 113 points. Ginnell was credited with turning the Bombers into a hard-working and physically tough team. The arrangement with the MJHL would last just one season, with the Bombers leaving the league in 1967.

=== Western Canada Hockey League ===
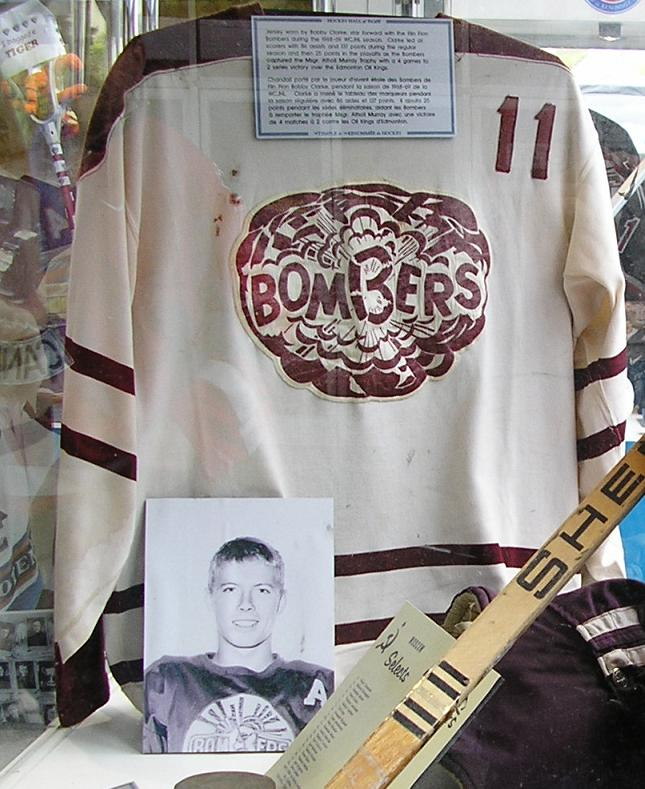
Bobby Clarke's Bombers jersey on display at the 2007 Memorial Cup in Vancouver.

After its inaugural season, the CMJHL was renamed the Western Canada Junior Hockey League, which was then simplified to the Western Canada Hockey league one year later. After their one season in the MJHL, the Bombers joined the WCHL, now the top level of junior hockey in Western Canada, for the 1967–68 season, and they immediately built on their previous success.

The Clarke-led Bombers continued to dominate, finishing in first place for the 1967–68 regular season before losing in the President's Cup finals to the Estevan Bruins. The Bombers again finished in first place in the 1968–69 season, going on to win that season's playoffs to become President's Cup champions, defeating the Edmonton Oil Kings. Clarke led the league in scoring both seasons (1967-68 and 1968-69) with 168 and 137 points respectively, while Leach recorded 87 goals and 131 points in 1967–68. As 1969 WCHL champion, the Bombers proceeded to win a national championship in 1969 by defeating the St. Thomas Barons of the Western Ontario Junior A Hockey League; the best-of-seven series was unsanctioned by the Canadian Amateur Hockey Association (CAHA), which at the time had barred the WCHL from competing for the Memorial Cup. The short-lived Canadian Hockey Association organized an alternate championship; despite being a best-of-seven, St. Thomas withdrew from the series during the fourth game while trailing the game and the series two games to one, protesting the Bombers' physical style of play, and the Bombers were awarded the title. After the series, Flin Flon challenged the Memorial Cup-champion Montreal Junior Canadiens to a showdown, but the Montreal club declined. The following season, with Clarke having graduated to the professional ranks, the Bombers repeated as league champions, again defeating Edmonton, with Leach leading the league in scoring. Due to the controversy surrounding the previous years series against St. Thomas, there was no national series in 1970.

The growing financial demands of major junior hockey, notably extensive travel expenses, became a strain for the Bombers, who played in one of the league's smallest and most remote communities. Not only was the travel difficult for the Bombers, but was also difficult for any team visiting Flin Flon. The franchise departed Flin Flon after the 1977–78 season. The franchise played three and a half seasons after leaving Flin Flon with iterations as the Edmonton Oil Kings—after the original Oil Kings departed Edmonton in 1976 due to pressure from the Edmonton Oilers—for the 1978–79 season, the Great Falls Americans for part of 1979–80 before suspending operations, and the Spokane Flyers for 1980–81 and start of the 1981–82 season before folding in December 1981.

=== Return to Junior A ===
In 1977, the WCHL Bombers had formed an affiliate Junior B team. The Jr. B Bombers would win the 1977–78 Baldy Northcott Trophy as Manitoba Provincial Champions. When the WCHL Bombers departed to Edmonton, the Bombers' ownership retained the Junior B Bombers. The Flin Flon ownership, along with the owners of the Thompson King Miners, banded together with people from The Pas and Snow Lake, Manitoba to create the NorMan Junior Hockey League (NJHL), a rival to the Manitoba Junior League; the following year, the NJHL—along with the Bombers—would be promoted to Junior A status and the right to compete for a national Junior A championship. Flin Flon won NJHL titles in 1979, 1982, and 1984.

For the 1984–85 season, the Bombers were granted expansion into the Saskatchewan Junior Hockey League (SJHL), which had been revived in 1968 following the 1966 demise of the original SJHL. For two seasons, due to SJHL rules requiring teams to be located in Saskatchewan, the team was re-named the Creighton Bombers after the adjacent community of Creighton, Saskatchewan, despite Flin Flon straddling the provincial border. After two seasons, the league allowed the team to re-adopt the Flin Flon moniker.

=== Modern era ===
Success was not immediate for the Bombers following their entry into the SJHL. The team made the playoffs in its first season in 1985, but fell to a quarterfinal sweep by the Weyburn Red Wings. The Bombers would miss the playoffs the following two seasons before suffering three straight exits in the first round. The team won its first SJHL playoff game of the modern era in 1992 against the Nipawin Hawks - but fell in five games.

The following season, playoff success for the Bombers who won the 1993 league championship in a seven game series with the Melville Millionaires, going on to win the ANAVET Cup over the Dauphin Kings but finishing fifth at that year's Centennial Cup. In the years following, the Bombers struggled to recapture postseason success until the 2000-01 season, when the team won its first regular season pennant. The Bombers were defeated by Nipawin in the semi finals, but still qualified for the 2001 Royal Bank Cup as the host team. At the tournament, Flin Flon made the final, defeating the SJHL champion Weyburn Red Wings in the semi finals before falling to the Camrose Kodiaks of the Alberta Junior Hockey League in the final.

After the Royal Bank Cup, the Bombers missed the playoffs in four straight seasons and did not return to the league final until 2015-16, losing in a six game series to the Melfort Mustangs. The Bombers would return to the final the following season, losing to the Battlefords North Stars.

Following a two-season SJHL hiatus due to the COVID-19 pandemic, the Bombers returned to the league final in 2021-22 and fell to the Estevan Bruins. Despite being the league runners-up, the Bombers would still appear in the 2022 Centennial Cup where Estevan was the host. It was the first of three consecutive seasons where the Bombers made the final, but a championship still eluded the team.

In 2025-26, Flin Flon completed a dominant SJHL season where the team finished first in the regular season standings and won the SJHL Championship, the Canterra Seeds Cup, for the first time since 1993 with a sweep of the Yorkton Terriers in four games.

At the 2026 Centennial Cup the Bombers did not qualify for the playoff round, finishing the tournament with a record of 2-2.

== Notable alumni ==
- Murray Anderson
- Steve Andrascik
- Ron Andruff
- Chuck Arnason
- Ron Barkwell
- Wayne Bianchin
- Ken Block
- Gene Carr
- Bobby Clarke
- Kim Clackson
- Cam Connor
- Jordy Douglas
- Gerry Ehman
- George Forgie
- Jean Gauthier
- Tom Gilmore
- Patty Ginnell
- Ted Hampson
- Gerry Hart
- Doug Hicks
- Glenn Hicks
- Garry Howatt
- Connor Ingram
- Dan Johnson
- Robert Kabel
- Mickey Keating
- George Konik
- Orland Kurtenbach
- Reggie Leach
- Ken Macdonald
- Ray Martyniuk
- Jack McIlhargey
- Lew Morrison
- Mel Pearson
- Cliff Pennington
- Dennis Polonich
- Tracy Pratt
- Mike Reagan
- Larry Romanchych
- Duane Rupp
- Pat Rupp
- John Stewart
- Blaine Stoughton
- Chris Worthy
- Ray Neufeld

=== League and Championship Summary ===
League	Years	Seasons	League Championships	Most Recent Championship	Intraprovincial Championships
NSSHL	1937-1938	2	1	1938	-
SSHL	1937-1944	8	2	1944	-
NSJHL	1949-1950	2	0	-	-
SJHL (1948-1966)	1951-1966	16	7	1960	Abbot Cup, Memorial Cup (1957)
MJHL	1967	1	0	-	-
WCHL	1968-1978	11	2	1970	James Piggot (1969)
NJHL	1979-1984	6	3	1984	-
SJHL (est. 1968)	1985-Present	42	2	2026	Anavet Cup (1993); 3 Centennial Cup appearances (1993, 2022, 2026)

=== Season-by-season record ===
Flin Flon Bombers Franchise Record
Season	GP	W	L	T	OTL	SOL	GF	GA	P	PCT	Coach	Final Ranking		Playoffs
Season	GP	W	L	T	OTL	SOL	GF	GA	P	PCT	Coach	Division	League	Playoffs
1936–1938: Northern Saskatchewan Senior Hockey League (part of the Saskatchewan Senior Hockey League)
1936–37	18	8	9	1	—	—	56	58	17	.471	Oldie Lowe	—	3rd of 4	Lost final
1937–38	24	15	8	1	—	—	80	59	31	.652	Oldie Lowe	—	1st of 3	Won NSSHL Won SSHL
1939–1944: Saskatchewan Senior Hockey League
1938–39	30	14	13	3	—	—	105	88	31	.517	Oldie Lowe	—	4th of 6	Lost semifinal
1939–40	32	13	18	1	—	—	114	125	27	.419	Oldie Lowe	—	5th of 5	DNQ
1940–41	32	14	16	2	—	—	121	148	30	.469	Oldie Lowe	—	4th of 5	Lost semifinal
1941–42	32	13	19	0	—	—	105	131	26	.406	Jack Holmes	—	4th of 5	Lost semifinal
1942–43	24	10	12	2	—	—	96	94	22	.455	Jack Holmes	—	3rd of 5	Lost final
1943–44	24	10	14	0	—	—	120	123	20	.417	Transitional	—	2nd of 3	Won SSHL
1945–1948: Did not play in an organized league
1949–1950: North Saskatchewan Junior Hockey League
1948–49	24	5	18	1	—	—	76	119	11	.229	Jack Holmes	—	4th of 4	Lost semifinal
1949–50	24	14	9	1	—	—	129	109	29	.604	Jack Holmes	—	2nd of 4	Lost final
1951–1966: Saskatchewan Junior Hockey League
1950–51	26	24	11	1	—	—	189	147	49	.681	Alex Shibicky	—	1st of 4	Lost final
1951–52	50	18	27	5	—	—	211	236	41	.410	Alex Shibicky	—	4th of 4	Won SJHL
1952–53	45	30	13	2	—	—	200	183	62	.689	Alex Shibicky	—	1st of 4	Won SJHL
1953–54	48	27	21	0	—	—	297	204	54	.563	Alex Shibicky	—	2nd of 4	Won SJHL
1954–55	48	23	24	1	—	—	218	215	47	.490	Bobby Kirk	—	2nd of 4	Lost semifinal
1955–56	48	37	10	1	—	—	301	149	75	.781	Bobby Kirk	—	1st of 5	Won SJHL
1956–57	53	48	5	2	—	—	309	108	94	.891	Bobby Kirk	—	1st of 6	Won SJHL; Won Abbott Cup; Won Memorial Cup
1957–58	55	28	25	2	—	—	220	177	58	.527	Bobby Kirk	—	3rd of 6	Lost final
1958–59	48	35	12	1	—	—	269	144	71	.740	Emmanuel McLean	—	1st of 7	Won SJHL
1959–60	54	35	16	3	—	—	301	189	82	.676	Bobby Kirk	—	1st of 7	Won SJHL
1960–61	60	25	28	7	—	—	184	203	57	.475	Bobby Kirk	—	5th of 7	DNQ
1961–62	56	29	22	5	—	—	244	199	63	.563	Bobby Kirk	—	3rd of 8	Lost semifinal
1962–63	54	17	35	2	—	—	152	237	36	.333	Bobby Kirk	—	6th of 7	Lost quarterfinal
1963–64	62	19	32	11	—	—	262	304	49	.395	Bobby Kirk	—	6th of 8	Lost quarterfinal
1964–65	56	21	29	6	—	—	255	298	48	.429	Tom Baird	—	5th of 8	Lost quarterfinal
1965–66	60	8	51	1	—	—	199	490	17	.142	Tom Baird	—	8th of 8	DNQ
1967: Manitoba Junior Hockey League
1966–67	58	52	6	0	—	—	406	125	104	.929	Pat Ginnell	—	1st of 7	Won MJHL
1968–1978: Western Canada Hockey League
1967–68 (CMJHL)	60	47	8	5	—	—	361	143	99	.825	Pat Ginnell	—	1st of 11	Lost final
1968–69	60	47	13	0	—	—	343	159	94	.783	Pat Ginnell	1st East	1st of 8	Won WHL; Won James Piggott National Championship
1969–70	60	42	18	0	—	—	257	176	84	.700	Pat Ginnell	1st East	1st of 8	Won WHL
1970–71	66	41	23	2	—	—	306	224	84	.636	Pat Ginnell	2nd East	3rd of 10	Lost final
1971–72	68	31	36	1	—	—	265	307	63	.463	Pat Ginnell	4th East	8th of 12	Lost quarterfinal
1972–73	68	39	19	10	—	—	334	228	88	.647	Pat Ginnell	2nd East	3rd of 12	Lost semi-final
1973–74	68	34	21	13	—	—	322	259	81	.596	Pat Ginnell	2nd East	4th of 12	Lost quarterfinal
1974–75	70	19	42	9	—	—	262	389	47	.336	Mel Pearson	6th East	11th of 12	DNQ
1975–76	72	18	44	10	—	—	279	441	46	.319	Mickey Keating	6th East	12th of 12	DNQ
1976–77	72	16	42	14	—	—	294	411	46	.319	Mickey Keating	3rd East	11th of 12	DNQ
1977–78	72	33	30	9	—	—	396	380	75	.521	Mickey Keating	2nd East	7th of 12	Lost semifinal
1979–1984: NorMan Junior Hockey League
1978–79	24	20	2	2	—	—	210	—	42	.909	Jim Wood	—	1st of 3	Won NMJHL
1979–80	36	22	12	2	—	—	221	201	46	.647	Tom Skinner	—	2nd of 4	Lost final
1980–81	42	27	12	3	—	—	314	209	57	.692	Tom Skinner	—	1st of 4	Lost final
1981–82	42	42	0	0	—	—	544	146	84	1.000	Tom Skinner	—	2nd of 4	Won NMJHL
1982–83	Statistics not available											—	2nd of 4	Lost final
1983–84	Statistics not available											—	2nd of 4	Won NMJHL
1985–present: Saskatchewan Junior Hockey League
As Creighton Bombers
1984–85	64	16	48	0	—	—	294	495	32	.250	Mel Pearson	—	8th of 9	Lost quarterfinal
1985–86	60	13	46	1	—	—	234	452	27	.220	—	—	10th of 10	DNQ
As Flin Flon Bombers
1986–87	64	13	50	1	—	—	249	430	27	.211	—	—	9th of 9	DNQ
1987–88	60	21	35	4	—	—	207	337	46	.383	Leo MacDonald	—	8th of 11	Lost quarterfinal
1988–89	64	36	26	2	—	—	342	303	74	.578	Leo MacDonald	3rd North	5th of 11	Lost quarterfinal
1989–90	68	30	33	5	—	—	293	325	65	.478	Leo MacDonald	4th North	8th of 11	Lost quarterfinal
1990–91	68	27	36	5	—	—	208	286	59	.434	Norm Johnston	5th North	9th of 11	DNQ
1991–92	64	27	32	5	—	—	206	243	59	.461	Norm Johnston	3rd North	8th of 12	Lost division semifinal
1992–93	64	35	23	6	—	—	277	215	76	.594	Norm Johnston	2nd North	4th of 12	Won SJHL; Won Anavet Cup
1993–94	68	36	28	4	—	—	272	259	76	.559	Norm Johnston	4th North	7th of 13	Lost division quarterfinal
1994–95	64	14	44	6	—	—	184	336	34	.266	—	6th North	13th of 13	DNQ
1995–96	64	21	38	5	—	—	201	280	47	.367	—	5th North	9th of 13	Lost division quarterfinal
1996–97	64	23	37	4	—	—	204	250	50	.391	Ray Maluta	6th North	10th of 13	DNQ
1997–98	64	23	33	8	—	—	191	249	54	.422	Larry Wintoneak	6th North	11th of 13	DNQ
1998–99	66	34	29	3	—	—	194	224	71	.538	Larry Wintoneak	5th North	9th of 14	Lost division quarterfinal
1999–2000	60	29	27	4	—	—	215	180	62	.517	Larry Wintoneak	5th North	8th of 13	Lost division semifinal
2000–01	62	44	15	3	0	—	271	182	91	.734	Larry Wintoneak	1st Dodge	1st of 13	Lost Division final
2001–02	64	10	46	6	2	—	170	334	28	.219	Troy Walkington	6th Dodge	12th of 12	DNQ
2002–03	60	10	41	6	3	—	168	290	29	.242	Troy Walkington	7th Dodge	12th of 12	DNQ
2003–04	60	17	28	12	3	—	183	238	49	.408	Ryan Hoffman	5th Dodge	10th of 12	DNQ
2004–05	55	10	36	6	3	—	138	244	29	.264	Ryan Hoffman	6th Itech	12th of 12	DNQ
2005–06	55	19	33	1	2	—	173	216	41	.373	Ryan Hoffman / Stokes	5th Itech	10th of 12	Lost division semifinal
2006–07	58	18	38	—	2	—	168	264	38	.328	Doug Stokes	6th Itech	12th of 12	DNQ
2007–08	58	33	21	—	4	—	219	172	70	.603	Mike Reagan	3rd Itech	5th of 12	Lost Division final
2008–09	56	32	20	—	4	—	213	168	68	.607	Mike Reagan	2nd Itech	4th of 12	Lost Division final
2009–10	58	37	17	—	4	—	214	157	78	.672	Mike Reagan	1st Itech	2nd of 12	Lost division semifinal
2010–11	58	25	31	—	2	0	196	212	52	.448	Mike Reagan	5th Bauer	9th of 12	Lost division semifinal
2011–12	58	28	21	—	3	6	205	214	65	.560	Mike Reagan	5th Bauer	8th of 12	Lost division quarterfinal
2012–13	54	34	19	—	1	0	198	143	69	.639	Mike Reagan	3rd North	5th of 12	Lost Division final
2013–14	56	23	30	—	1	2	139	169	49	.438	Mike Reagan	3rd Sherwood	10th of 12	Lost Wild Card
2014–15	56	31	13	—	6	6	207	159	74	.661	Mike Reagan	2nd Sherwood	5th of 12	Lost quarterfinal
2015–16	58	34	20	—	0	4	216	169	72	.621	Mike Reagan	3rd Sherwood	6th of 12	Lost final
2016–17	58	39	14	—	2	3	245	150	83	.716	Mike Reagan	1st Sherwood	2nd of 12	Lost final
2017–18	58	24	26	—	3	5	194	216	56	.483	Mike Reagan	3rd Sherwood	9th of 12	Lost quarterfinal
2018–19	58	36	16	—	1	3	233	186	72	.621	Mike Reagan	3rd Sherwood	6th of 12	Lost quarterfinal
2019–20	58	36	15	—	7	0	265	192	79	.681	Mike Reagan	1st Sherwood	2nd of 12	Cancelled (COVID-19)
2020–21	2	0	2	—	0	0	4	11	0	.000	Mike Reagan	n/a	n/a	Cancelled (COVID-19)
2021–22	58	34	21	—	2	1	206	158	71	.612	Mike Reagan	2nd Sherwood	5th of 12	Lost final
2022–23	56	37	15	—	2	2	200	153	78	.696	Mike Reagan	1st Sherwood	4th of 12	Lost final
2023–24	56	44	9	—	2	1	244	129	91	.813	Mike Reagan	1st Sherwood	1st of 12	Lost final
2024–25	56	38	13	—	4	1	207	131	81	.723	Mike Reagan	2nd Sherwood	2nd of 12	Lost semifinal
2025–26	56	41	11	—	3	1	234	135	86	.768	Mike Reagan	1st UPL	1st of 12	Won SJHL
2026-27	—	—	—	—	—	—	—	—	—	—	Cole McCaig	—	—	—

=== Playoff record ===
Northern Saskatchewan Senior Hockey League, 1937–1938

- 1937

Semifinal: Flin Flon Bombers defeated Prince Albert Mintos 2 games to 0
Final: North Battleford Beavers defeated Flin Flon Bombers 3 games to 1

- 1938

Semifinal: Flin Flon Bombers received a bye to the league final
Final: Flin Flon Bombers defeated Saskatoon Quakers 4 games to 3 Won NSHL Championship
SSHL Final: Flin Flon Bombers defeated Moose Jaw Millers 2 games to 1 (1 tie) WON SSHL Championship
Allan Cup: Trail Smoke Eaters defeated Flin Flon Bombers 2 games to 1

Saskatchewan Senior Hockey League, 1939–1944

- 1939

Semifinal: Moose Jaw Millers defeated Flin Flon Bombers 3 games to 1 (1 tie)

- 1940 Did not qualify
- 1941

Semifinal: Regina Rangers defeated Flin Flon Bombers 3 games to 0

- 1942

Semifinal: Saskatoon Quakers defeated Flin Flon Bombers 3 games to 0

- 1943

Semifinal: Flin Flon Bombers defeated Saskatoon RCAF Flyers 3 games to 0
Final: Regina Army Capitals defeated Flin Flon Bombers 4 games to 2

- 1944

Semifinal: Flin Flon Bombers defeated Moose Jaw Victorias 2 games to 0
Final: Flin Flon Bombers defeated Saskatoon Navy 3 games to 1 Won SSHL Championship
Allan Cup Playoffs: New Westminster CPA Lodestars defeated Flin Flon Bombers 3 games to 1

- 1945 to 1948: No information available

North Saskatchewan Junior Hockey League, 1949–50

- 1949

Semifinal: Prince Albert Mintos defeated Flin Flon Bombers 2 games to 1

- 1950

Semifinal: Prince Albert Mintos defeated Flin Flon Bombers 3 games to 1

Saskatchewan Junior Hockey League, 1951–1966

- 1951

Semifinal: Flin Flon Bombers defeated Humboldt Indians 3 games to 0 (1 tie)
Final: Prince Albert Mintos defeated Flin Flon Bombers 3 games to 0

- 1952

Semifinal: Flin Flon Bombers defeated Saskatoon Wesleys 4 games to 1
Final: Flin Flon Bombers defeated Humboldt Indians 3 games to 2 Won SJHL Championship
Western Canada Memorial Cup Playoffs: Regina Pats defeated Flin Flon Bombers 4 games to 0

- 1953

Semifinal: Flin Flon Bombers defeated Prince Albert Mintos 4 games to 2
Final: Flin Flon Bombers defeated Humboldt Indians 4 games to 1 Won SJHL Championship
Western Canada Memorial Cup Playoffs: Lethbridge Native Sons defeated Flin Flon Bombers 4 games to 0

- 1954

Semifinal: Flin Flon Bombers defeated Saskatoon Wesleys 4 games to 3
Final: Flin Flon Bombers defeated Prince Albert Mintos 5 games to 4 (1 tie) Won SJHL Championship
Western Canada Memorial Cup Playoffs: Edmonton Oil Kings defeated Flin Flon Bombers 4 games to 0

- 1955

Semifinal: Prince Albert Mintos defeated Flin Flon Bombers 4 games to 1

- 1956

Semifinal: Flin Flon Bombers defeated Humboldt–Melfort Indians 4 games to 1
Final: Flin Flon Bombers defeated Prince Albert Mintos 3 games to 2 (2 ties) Won SJHL Championship
Western Canada Memorial Cup Playoffs: Regina Pats defeated Flin Flon Bombers 4 games to 3

- 1957

Semifinal: Flin Flon Bombers defeated Humboldt–Melfort Indians 4 games to 0
Final: Flin Flon Bombers defeated Prince Albert Mintos 4 games to 2 Won SJHL Championship
Western Canada Memorial Cup Semifinal: Flin Flon Bombers defeated Edmonton Oil Kings 4 games to 2
Abbot Cup: Flin Flon Bombers defeated Fort William Canadiens 4 games to 0 Won Abbott Cup
Memorial Cup: Flin Flon Bombers defeated Ottawa-Hull Canadiens 4 games to 3 Won Memorial Cup

- 1958

Semifinal: Flin Flon Bombers defeated Prince Albert Mintos 3 games to 1 (2 ties)
Final: Regina Pats defeated Flin Flon Bombers 4 games to 2

- 1959

Semifinal: Flin Flon Bombers defeated Saskatoon Quakers 4 games to 1
Final: Flin Flon Bombers defeated Estevan Bruins 4 games to 2 Won SJHL Championship
Western Canada Memorial Cup Semifinal: Flin Flon Bombers defeated Edmonton Oil Kings 4 games to 0
Western Canada Memorial Cup Final: Winnipeg Braves defeated Flin Flon Bombers 4 games to 2

- 1960

Semifinal: Flin Flon Bombers defeated Saskatoon Quakers 4 games to 2 (1 tie)
Final: Flin Flon Bombers defeated Regina Pats 4 games to 1 (1 tie) Won SJHL Championship
Western Canada Memorial Cup Semifinal: Edmonton Oil Kings defeated Flin Flon Bombers 4 games to 2

- 1961 Did not qualify
- 1962

Flin Flon Bombers placed 5th place of 6 (2–8–0) in round robin

- 1963 Did not qualify
- 1964

Quarterfinal: Saskatoon Blades defeated Flin Flon Bombers 4 games to 3

- 1965

Quarterfinal:Weyburn Red Wings defeated Flin Flon Bombers 4 games to 1

- 1966 Did not qualify

Manitoba Junior Hockey League, 1967

- 1967

Semifinal: Flin Flon Bombers defeated Winnipeg Monarchs 3 games to 0
Final: Flin Flon Bombers defeated Brandon Wheat Kings 3 games to 2 Won MJHL Championship (Turnbull Cup)
Western Canada Memorial Cup Final: Port Arthur Marrs defeated Flin Flon Bombers 4 games to 2

Western Canada Hockey League, 1968–1978

- 1968 (CMJHL)

Quarterfinal: Flin Flon Bombers defeated Regina Pats 4 games to 0
Semifinal: Flin Flon Bombers defeated Edmonton Oil Kings 4 games to 1 (1 tie)
Final: Estevan Bruins defeated Flin Flon Bombers 4 games to 0 (1 tie)

- 1969

Quarterfinal: Flin Flon Bombers defeated Winnipeg Jets 4 games to 2 (1 tie)
Semifinal: Flin Flon Bombers defeated Estevan Bruins 4 games to 0 (1 tie)
Final: Flin Flon Bombers defeated Edmonton Oil Kings 4 games to 2 Won WHL Championship
James Piggott National Championship: Flin Flon Bombers defeated St. Thomas Barons 2 games to 1^{†} Won James Piggott National Championship

^{†}Series forfeited by St. Thomas while down two games to one, and losing 4–0 at 10:10 of the second period of the fourth game

- 1970

Quarterfinal: Flin Flon Bombers defeated Brandon Wheat Kings 5 games to 0
Semifinal: Flin Flon Bombers defeated Winnipeg Jets 5 games to 4
Final: Flin Flon Bombers defeated Edmonton Oil Kings 4 games to 0 Won WHL Championship

- 1971

Quarterfinal: Flin Flon Bombers defeated Regina Pats 4 games to 1 (1 tie)
Semifinal: Flin Flon Bombers defeated Winnipeg 5 games to 2
Final: Edmonton Oil Kings defeated Flin Flon Bombers 4 games to 1 (1 tie)

- 1972

Quarterfinal: Regina Pats defeated Flin Flon Bombers 3 games to 2 (2 ties)

- 1973

Quarterfinal: Flin Flon Bombers defeated Regina Pats 4 games to 0
Semifinal: Saskatoon Blades defeated Flin Flon Bombers 4 games to 1

- 1974

Quarterfinal: Swift Current Broncos defeated Flin Flon Bombers 4 games to 3

- 1975 Did not qualify
- 1976 Did not qualify
- 1977 Did not qualify
- 1978

Flin Flon Bombers advanced in Division round robin to Semifinal (4–4)
Semifinal: Flin Flon Bombers defeated Regina Pats 4 games to 1
Flin Flon Bombers eliminated in semifinal round robin (0–4)

NorMan Junior Hockey League, 1979–1984

- 1979

Final: Flin Flon Bombers defeated Thompson Nickel Knights Won NMJHL Championship
Baldy Northcott Trophy: Transcona Railers defeated Flin Flon Bombers

- 1980

Semifinal: Flin Flon Bombers defeated The Pas Lumber Kings 3 games to 0
Final: Thompson King Miners defeated Flin Flon Bombers 3 games to 1

- 1981

Semifinal: Flin Flon Bombers defeated The Pas Lumber Kings
Final: Thompson King Miners defeated Flin Flon Bombers 4 games to 2

- 1982

Final: Flin Flon Bombers defeated Thompson King Miners 4 games to 0 Won NMJHL Championship
Turnbull Cup: Winnipeg South Blues defeated Flin Flon Bombers 3 games to 0

- 1983

Final: The Pas Huskies defeated Flin Flon Bombers 4 games to 3

- 1984

Final: Flin Flon Bombers defeated Thompson King Miners 4 games to 2 Won NMJHL Championship
Turnbull Cup: Selkirk Steelers defeated Flin Flon Bombers 4 games to 1

Saskatchewan Junior Hockey League, 1985–present

- 1985

Quarterfinal: Weyburn Red Wings defeated Flin Flon Bombers 4 games to 0

- 1986 Did not qualify
- 1987 Did not qualify
- 1988

Quarterfinal: Nipawin Hawks defeated Flin Flon Bombers 4 games to 0

- 1989

Quarterfinal: Yorkton Terriers defeated Flin Flon Bombers 4 games to 0

- 1990

Quarterfinal: Nipawin Hawks defeated Flin Flon Bombers 4 games to 0

- 1991 Did not qualify
- 1992

Quarterfinal: Humboldt Broncos defeated Flin Flon Bombers 4 games to 1

- 1993

Quarterfinal: Flin Flon Bombers defeated Humboldt Broncos 4 games to 1
Semifinal: Flin Flon Bombers defeated Nipawin Hawks 4 games to 1
Final: Flin Flon Bombers defeated Melville Millionaires 4 games to 3 Won SJHL Championship (Hanbidge Cup)
Anavet Cup: Flin Flon Bombers defeated Dauphin Kings 4 games to 2 Won Anavet Cup
Centennial Cup Round Robin: Flin Flon Bombers placed fifth in 1993 Centennial Cup round robin (0–4)

- 1994

Preliminary round: Nipawin Hawks defeated Flin Flon Bombers 2 games to 0

- 1995 Did not qualify
- 1996

Preliminary round: Humboldt Broncos defeated Flin Flon Bombers 2 games to 0

- 1997 Did not qualify
- 1998 Did not qualify
- 1999

Preliminary round: Battlefords North Stars defeated Flin Flon Bombers 2 games to 0

- 2000

Quarterfinal: Humboldt Broncos defeated Flin Flon Bombers 4 games to 0

- 2001

Quarterfinal: Flin Flon Bombers defeated Humboldt Broncos 4 games to 1
Semifinal: Nipawin Hawks defeated Flin Flon Bombers 4 games to 1
RBC Cup Round Robin^{†}: Third in 2001 Royal Bank Cup round robin (2–2)
RBC Cup Semi-Final: Flin Flon Bombers defeated Weyburn Red Wings 4–0
RBC Final: Camrose Kodiaks defeated Flin Flon Bombers 5–0

^{†}Qualified for RBC Cup as hosts

- 2002 Did not qualify
- 2003 Did not qualify
- 2004 Did not qualify
- 2005 Did not qualify
- 2006

Quarterfinal: Flin Flon Bombers defeated Melfort Mustangs 4 games to 3
Semifinal: Battlefords North Stars defeated Flin Flon Bombers 4 games to 1

- 2007 Did not qualify
- 2008

Quarterfinal: Flin Flon Bombers defeated Melfort Mustangs 4 games to 2
Semifinal: Humboldt Broncos defeated 4 games to 0

- 2009

Quarterfinal: Flin Flon Bombers defeated Melfort Mustangs 4 games to 0
Semifinal: Humboldt Broncos defeated Flin Flon Bombers 4 games to 0

- 2010

Quarterfinal: La Ronge Ice Wolves defeated Flin Flon Bombers 4 games to 2

- 2011

Survivor Series: Flin Flon Bombers defeated Battlefords North Stars 3 games to 1
Quarterfinal: La Ronge Ice Wolves defeated Flin Flon Bombers 4 games to 1

- 2012

Survivor Series: La Ronge Ice Wolves defeated Flin Flon Bombers 3 games to 0

- 2013

Quarterfinal: Flin Flon Bombers defeated Nipawin Hawks 4 games to 2
Semifinal: Humboldt Broncos defeated Flin Flon Bombers 4 games to 1

- 2014

Wildcard Series: Estevan Bruins defeated Flin Flon Bombers 3 games to 2

- 2015

Quarterfinal: Notre Dame Hounds defeated Flin Flon Bombers 4 games to 3

- 2016

Quarterfinal: Flin Flon Bombers defeated Weyburn Red Wings 4 games to 1
Semifinal: Flin Flon Bombers defeated Battlefords North Stars 4 games to 1
Final: Melfort Mustangs defeated Flin Flon Bombers 4 games to 2

- 2017

Quarterfinal: Flin Flon Bombers defeated Notre Dame Hounds 4 games to 1
Semifinal: Flin Flon Bombers defeated Nipawin Hawks 4 games to 3
Final: Battlefords North Stars defeated Flin Flon Bombers 4 games to 0

- 2018

Wildcard Series: Flin Flon Bombers defeated Notre Dame Hounds 2 games to 1
Quarterfinal: Nipawin Hawks defeated Flin Flon Bombers 4 games to 1

- 2019

Wildcard Series: Flin Flon Bombers defeated Weyburn Red Wings 2 games to 0
Quarterfinal: Battlefords North Stars defeated Flin Flon Bombers 4 games to 3

- 2020

Quarterfinal: Flin Flon Bombers defeated Humboldt Broncos 4 games to 0
Playoffs cancelled due to COVID-19 pandemic

- 2021 Season cancelled due to COVID-19 pandemic
- 2022

Quarterfinal: Flin Flon Bombers defeated Battlefords North Stars 4 games to 2
Semifinal: Flin Flon Bombers defeated Humboldt Broncos 4 games to 1
Final: Estevan Bruins defeated Flin Flon Bombers 4 games to 3
Centennial Cup Round Robin^{†}: Flin Flon Bombers advanced to playoff round
Centennial Cup Quarterfinal: Pickering Panthers defeated Flin Flon Bombers 3 to 2 (2OT)

^{†}Qualified for Centennial Cup due to Estevan's host status

- 2023

Quarterfinal: Flin Flon Bombers defeated Estevan Bruins 4 games to 3
Semifinal: Flin Flon Bombers defeated Humboldt Broncos 4 games to 1
Final: Battlefords North Stars defeated Flin Flon Bombers 4 games to 0

- 2024

Quarterfinal: Flin Flon Bombers defeated Kindersley Klippers 4 games to 0
Semifinal: Flin Flon Bombers defeated Battlefords North Stars 4 games to 0
Final: Melfort Mustangs defeated Flin Flon Bombers 4 games to 2

- 2025

Quarterfinal: Flin Flon Bombers defeated Humboldt Broncos 4 games to 2
Semifinal: Weyburn Red Wings defeated Flin Flon Bombers 4 games to 2

- 2026

Quarterfinal: Flin Flon Bombers defeated Estevan Bruins 4 games to 0
Semifinal: Flin Flon Bombers defeated Weyburn Red Wings 4 games to 3
Final: Flin Flon Bombers defeated Yorkton Terriers 4 games to 0 Won SJHL Championship (Canterra Seeds Cup)
Centennial Cup Round Robin: Flin Flon Bombers eliminated in round robin (4th place Group B via 3-way team tiebreaker)

== Player awards ==
1957 Memorial Cup Champions

Harvey Fleming, Carl Forster, Cliff Lennartz, Barry Beatty, Mike Kardash, Duane Rupp, George Konik, Mel Pearson, Ken Willey, Rod Lee, Wayne Sproxton, Ted Hampson (captain), George Wood, Lynn Davis, Jean Gauthier, Ron Hutchinson, Orland Kurtenbach, Pat Ginnell, Doug Dawson (manager), Bobby Kirk (coach), Hec McCaig (trainer), Jim Wardle (executive), Pinkie Davie (executive), Ken Cunningham (stickboy), Rees Jones (stickboy), and Dan McCaig (mascot) were with the team through the SJHL and Abbott Cup championships, and were joined by Lynn Davis, Jean Gauthier, and Orland Kurtenbach for the Memorial Cup national championship.

Scoring champions

Season	League	Winner	GP	Goals	Assists	Points
1967-68	WCJHL	Bobby Clarke	59	51	117	168
1968-69	WCJHL	Bobby Clarke	58	51	86	137
1969-70	WCHL	Reggie Leach	57	65	46	111
1970-71	WCHL	Chuck Arnason	66	79	84	163
2007-08	SJHL	Reid MacLeod	57	47	42	89
2016-17	SJHL	Greyson Reitmeyer	58	28	51	79

Most Valuable Player

Season	League	Winner	GP	G/W	A/GAA	P/SV%
1968-69	WCJHL	Bobby Clarke	58	51	86	137
1969-70	WCHL	Reggie Leach	57	65	46	111
2000-01	SJHL	Morgan Cey	53	35	2.62	0.916
2024-25	SJHL	Matthew Kieper	27	23	1.80	0.935

Player of the Year

Season	League	Winner	GP	G	A	P
2015-16	SJHL	Alex Smith	56	32	52	84
2016-17	SJHL	Greyson Reitmeyer	58	28	51	79

Goaltender of the Year

Season	League	Winner	GP	Wins	Shutouts	GAA	Save %
1967-68	WCJHL	Chris Worthy	60	47	10	2.39	NA
1968-69	WCJHL	Ray Martyniuk	41	NA	6	2.52	NA
1969-70	WCHL	Ray Martyniuk	43	NA	4	2.58	NA
2023-24	SJHL	Harmon Laser-Hume	38	28	6	2.20	0.930
2024-25	SJHL	Matthew Kieper	27	23	3	1.80	0.935
2025-26	SJHL	Charlie Tritt	34	23	5	2.12	0.934

Defenceman of the Year

Season	League	Winner	GP	Goals	Assists	Points
1967-68	WCJHL	Gerry Hart	58	13	38	51
2012-13	SJHL	Josh Roach	53	13	41	54
2016-17	SJHL	Eric Sinclair	46	17	34	51
2021-22	SJHL	Xavier Lapointe	58	19	31	50
2023-24	SJHL	Noah Houle	52	12	56	68

Rookie of the Year

Season	League	Winner	Position	GP	G/W	A/GAA	PTS/SV%
1969-70	WCHL	Gene Carr	Center	60	22	51	73
1973-74	WCHL	Cam Connor	Right Wing	65	47	44	91
2006-07	SJHL	Reid MacLeod	Forward	58	24	37	61
2011-12	SJHL	Devin Buffalo	Goalie	38	18	3.37	.909
2012-13	SJHL	Brett Boehm	Right Wing	49	25	29	54
2019-20	SJHL	Tristan Lemyre	Center	44	30	32	62

Coach of the Year

Season	League	Winner
1969-70	WCHL	Paddy Ginnell
1970-71	WCHL	Paddy Ginnell
1972-73	WCHL	Paddy Ginnell
2023-24	SJHL	Mike Reagan

== See also ==
- List of ice hockey teams in Manitoba
- List of ice hockey teams in Saskatchewan
