= Orland Kurtenbach =

Canadian ice hockey player and coach

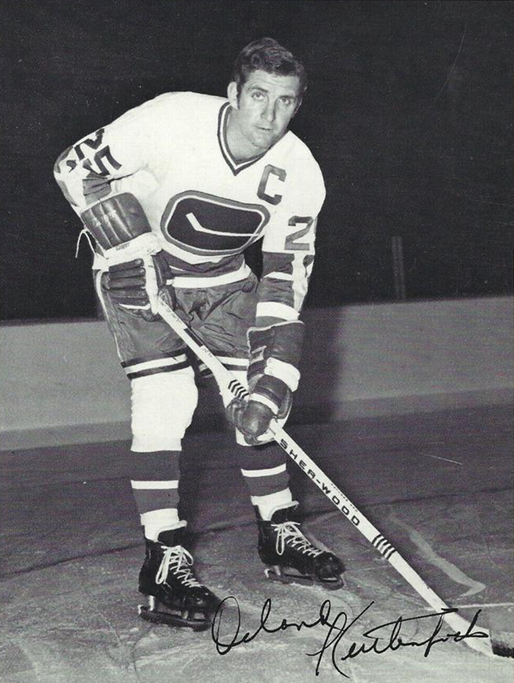
- Kurtenbach with the Vancouver Canucks in their inaugural season of 1970
- Born: September 7, 1936 (age 90) Cudworth, Saskatchewan, Canada
- Height: 6 ft 2 in (188 cm)
- Weight: 195 lb (88 kg; 13 st 13 lb)
- Position: Centre
- Shot: Left
- Played for: New York Rangers; Boston Bruins; Toronto Maple Leafs; Vancouver Canucks
- Playing career: 1954–1974

Orland John Kurtenbach (born September 7, 1936) is a Canadian former professional ice hockey player and coach. A centre notable for his defensive skill and as one of the toughest fighters in the game, he played for several National Hockey League (NHL) teams during his twenty professional seasons, principally the Vancouver Canucks, with whom he became the NHL franchise's inaugural captain.

== Early life ==
Kurtenbach was born in Cudworth, Saskatchewan. He grew up on a farm until his family moved to Prince Albert, Saskatchewan, at age 10. It was at this time that Kurtenbach began playing organized hockey. Beginning as a defenceman, he moved to the centre position later in his career.

== Playing career ==
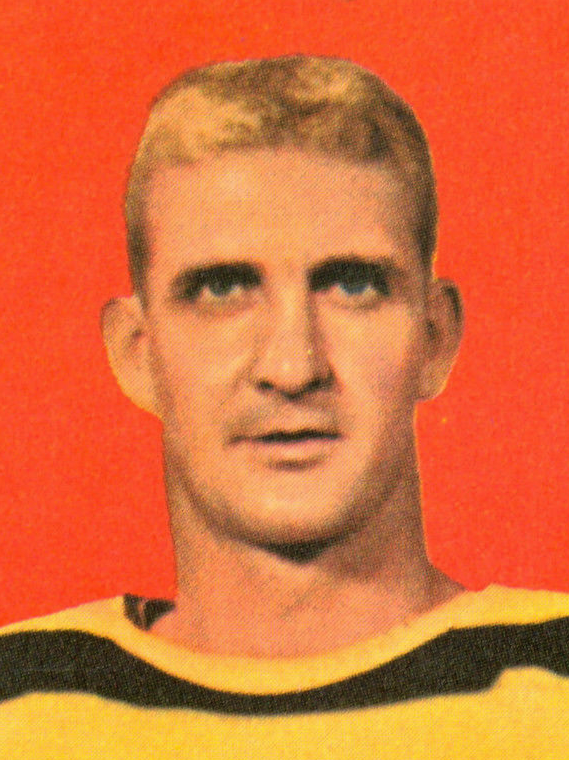
Kurtenbach during his time with the Boston Bruins

Kurtenbach played in the Saskatchewan Junior Hockey League (SJHL) with the Prince Albert Mintos for two seasons, also making brief appearances with the Saskatoon Quakers of the minor professional Western Hockey League (WHL) during that time. In 1957, after Prince Albert was eliminated from the SJHL playoffs, Kurtenbach finished the season with the Flin Flon Bombers, where he helped the team win a Memorial Cup.

Kurtenbach turned professional in 1957–58, signing a C-form with the Vancouver Canucks of the WHL. He scored 54 points in 52 games en route to earning Rookie of the Year honours. In the playoffs, he helped the Canucks to a President's Cup championship.

The majority of Kurtenbach's early professional career was spent in the minors, splitting time between the AHL with the Buffalo Bisons, Springfield Indians and Providence Reds, and the WHL with the San Francisco Seals and the Canucks. His best season in this stretch was 1962–63 when he notched 87 points for the Seals in 70 games and led the team in scoring in the playoffs en route to winning the league championship.

During his time in the minors, Kurtenbach made two brief appearances in the National Hockey League with the New York Rangers and Boston Bruins, totaling eighteen games, but he did not play his first full NHL season until 1963–64 with the Bruins. In 1965–66, he became a member of the Toronto Maple Leafs, where he played a primarily defensive role. Toronto coach Punch Imlach designated Kurtenbach to the bottom two offensive lines while earning mostly penalty killing time. The following season, he joined the New York Rangers, where he spent four seasons. In the 1970 off-season, he was told by Rangers management he would be unprotected for the upcoming NHL Expansion Draft to be picked up by either the Buffalo Sabres or the Vancouver Canucks (the franchise left the WHL to join the NHL).

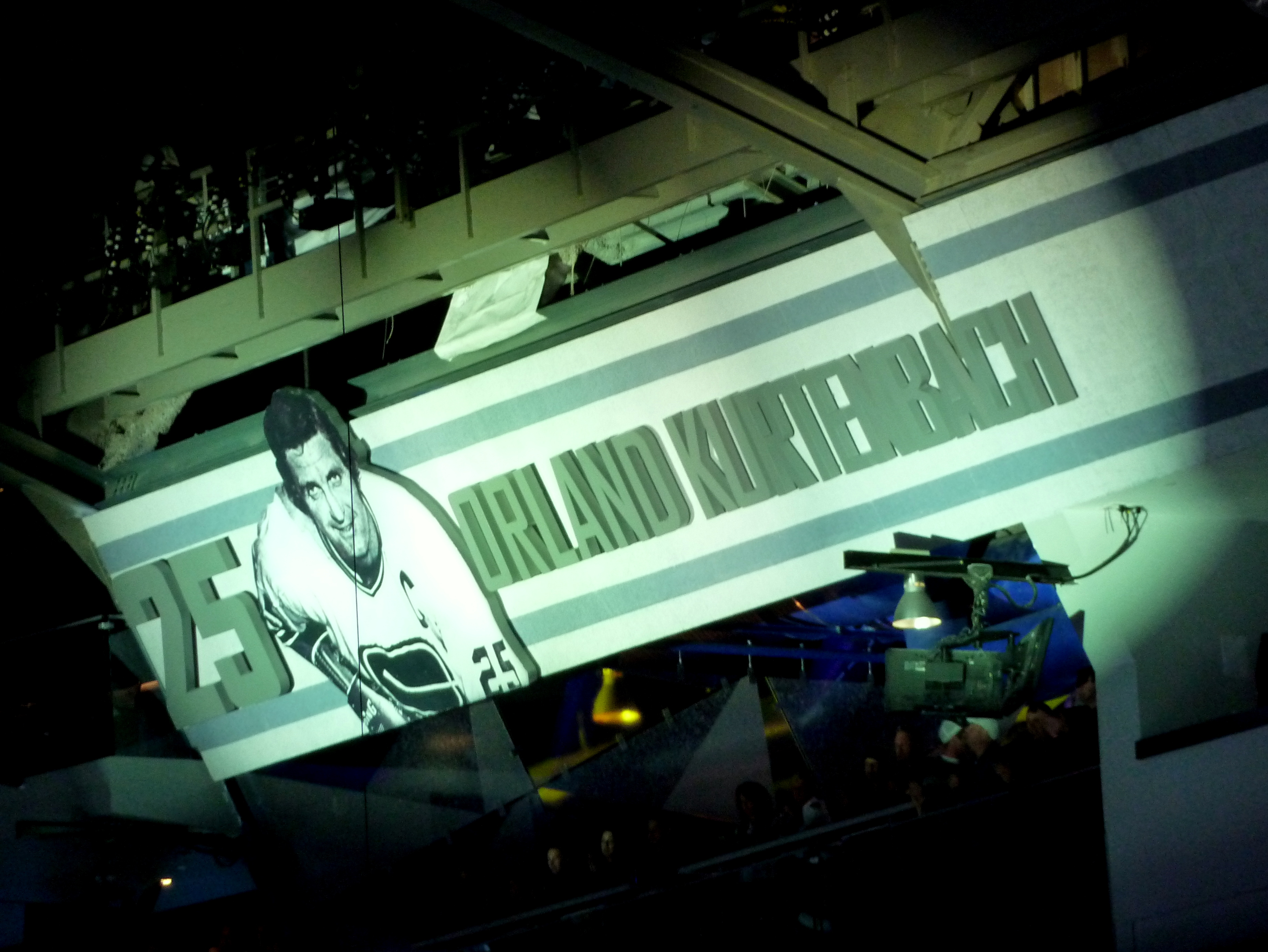
Kurtenbach's plaque on the Canucks' Ring of Honour in Rogers Arena.

Kurtenbach was obtained by the Canucks and was named the franchise's first NHL captain. On December 12, 1970, he recorded the first hat trick in Canucks history in a 5-2 victory over the California Golden Seals, it was also the only hat trick he ever recorded in his career. He recorded an NHL career-high point-per-game pace with 53 points in 52 games, despite suffering a serious injury on December 23 that sidelined him until March 3. The following season, he registered a career-high 61 points in 78 games. Many of Vancouver's players left the club that season, defecting to the nascent World Hockey Association (WHA) for larger salaries. Kurtenbach himself was offered a $150,000 contract with the Los Angeles Sharks, but he declined. He often played on a line with Wayne Maki and Murray Hall. Kurtenbach retired from the NHL after his fourth season with Vancouver.

Kurtenbach finished his NHL career with 119 goals and 213 assists for 332 points in 639 games, adding 628 penalty minutes. On October 26, 2010, Kurtenbach was the first Canucks player inducted into the team's Ring of Honour. A ceremony was held before a Canucks' game against the Colorado Avalanche.

== Coaching career ==
The season after his NHL retirement, Kurtenbach joined the Seattle Totems of the Central Hockey League, moving behind the bench as head coach. After a losing season with Seattle, he coached two seasons with the Tulsa Oilers of the same league and won a championship in his first season with them, 1975–76, being awarded the Jake Milford Trophy as CHL coach of the year.

In 1976–77, Kurtenbach returned to the NHL to replace Phil Maloney midway through the season as head coach of the Vancouver Canucks. This marked the third time in his playing and coaching career that he would represent Vancouver. However, after one and a half seasons and a 36–62–27 record, Kurtenbach was replaced by Harry Neale at the end of the 1977–78 season. Upon his replacement, Kurtenbach only returned to coaching to represent the Springfield Indians of the AHL in 1982 and the Richmond Sockeyes of the BCHL in 1986 (whom he guided to the 1987 Centennial Cup) before retiring.

== Personal life ==
During his time with the Vancouver Canucks of the WHL, he met his wife. In the 1970s he lived in north Burnaby with his wife Laurel and kids. In 1980s and 1990s he lived in White Rock, BC and operated a south Surrey, BC golf driving range.

== Career statistics ==
=== Regular season and playoffs ===
			Regular season					Playoffs
Season	Team	League	GP	G	A	Pts	PIM	GP	G	A	Pts	PIM
1953–54	Prince Albert Mintos	SJHL	47	29	40	69	48	15	11	10	21	14
1954–55	Prince Albert Mintos	SJHL	48	30	41	71	57	10	8	7	15	0
1954–55	Saskatoon Quakers	WHL	1	0	0	0	0	—	—	—	—	—
1955–56	Prince Albert Mintos	SJHL	43	41	38	79	66	12	5	12	17	13
1955–56	Saskatoon Quakers	WHL	3	0	0	0	4	2	0	0	0	0
1955–56	Flin Flon Bombers	M-Cup	—	—	—	—	—	5	1	3	4	2
1956–57	Prince Albert Mintos	SJHL	50	48	54	102	115	13	5	11	16	13
1956–57	Prince Albert Mintos	M-Cup	—	—	—	—	—	5	1	3	4	2
1957–58	Vancouver Canucks	WHL	52	15	39	54	58	8	3	3	6	8
1958–59	Buffalo Bisons	AHL	70	9	14	23	73	7	0	0	0	0
1959–60	Vancouver Canucks	WHL	42	11	27	38	51	11	1	5	6	11
1959–60	Springfield Indians	AHL	14	0	6	6	17	—	—	—	—	—
1960–61	Vancouver Canucks	WHL	55	20	27	47	31	—	—	—	—	—
1960–61	New York Rangers	NHL	10	0	6	6	2	—	—	—	—	—
1961–62	Boston Bruins	NHL	8	0	0	0	6	—	—	—	—	—
1961–62	Providence Reds	AHL	64	31	33	64	51	3	1	1	2	5
1962–63	San Francisco Seals	WHL	70	30	57	87	94	17	4	13	17	51
1963–64	Boston Bruins	NHL	70	12	25	37	91	—	—	—	—	—
1964–65	Boston Bruins	NHL	64	6	20	26	86	—	—	—	—	—
1965–66	Toronto Maple Leafs	NHL	70	9	6	15	54	4	0	0	0	20
1966–67	New York Rangers	NHL	60	11	25	36	58	3	0	2	2	0
1967–68	New York Rangers	NHL	73	15	20	35	82	6	1	0	1	26
1968–69	Omaha Knights	CHL	1	0	0	0	0	—	—	—	—	—
1968–69	New York Rangers	NHL	2	0	0	0	2	—	—	—	—	—
1969–70	New York Rangers	NHL	53	4	10	14	47	6	1	2	3	24
1969–70	Buffalo Bisons	AHL	6	1	5	6	2	—	—	—	—	—
1970–71	Vancouver Canucks	NHL	52	21	32	53	84	—	—	—	—	—
1971–72	Vancouver Canucks	NHL	78	24	37	61	48	—	—	—	—	—
1972–73	Vancouver Canucks	NHL	47	9	19	28	38	—	—	—	—	—
1973–74	Vancouver Canucks	NHL	52	8	13	21	30	—	—	—	—	—
WHL totals			223	76	150	226	238	38	8	21	29	70
NHL totals			639	119	213	332	628	19	2	4	6	70

== Awards and achievements ==
=== Player ===
- WHL Rookie of the Year - 1958
- Cyclone Taylor Trophy (Vancouver Canucks' MVP) - 1971, 1972, 1973
- Cyrus H. McLean Trophy (Vancouver Canucks' leading scorer) - 1972 (tied with André Boudrias)

=== Coach ===
- Jake Milford Trophy (CHL coach of the year) - 1976

== Coaching record ==
Team	Year	Regular season						Postseason
Team	Year	G	W	L	T	Pts	Division rank	Result
VAN	1976-77	45	16	19	10	(42)	4th in Smythe	Missed playoffs
VAN	1977-78	80	20	43	17	57	3rd in Smythe	Missed playoffs
Total		125	36	62	27			

Preceded by Position created	NHL Vancouver Canucks captain 1971–74	Succeeded by Andre Boudrias
Preceded by Phil Maloney	Head coach of the Vancouver Canucks; 1977–78	Succeeded by Harry Neale
