= Jean Gauthier =

Canadian ice hockey player

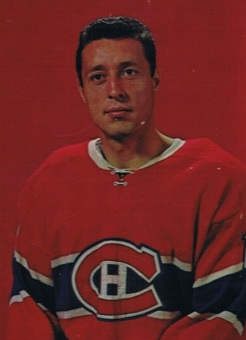
- Born: April 29, 1937 Montreal, Quebec, Canada
- Died: February 20, 2013 (aged 75) Kirkland, Quebec, Canada
- Height: 6 ft 1 in (185 cm)
- Weight: 196 lb (89 kg; 14 st 0 lb)
- Position: Defence
- Shot: Right
- Played for: Montreal Canadiens; Philadelphia Flyers; Boston Bruins; New York Raiders
- Playing career: 1959–1974

Joseph Jean-Philippe Gauthier (April 29, 1937 – February 20, 2013) was a Canadian professional ice hockey defenceman who played 166 games in the National Hockey League (NHL) with the Montreal Canadiens, Boston Bruins and Philadelphia Flyers and 31 games in the World Hockey Association (WHA) with the New York Raiders between 1960 and 1973. Gauthier was born in Montreal, Quebec. He died in 2013, at the age of 75.

== Awards ==
- Memorial Cup Championships (1957)
- CPHL First All-Star Team (1965)
- CPHL Second All-Star Team (1966)
- Stanley Cup champions (1965)

== Career statistics ==
=== Regular season and playoffs ===
| | | | Regular season | | | | | Playoffs |
| Season | Team | League | GP | G | A | Pts | PIM | GP | G | A | Pts | PIM |
|---|---|---|---|---|---|---|---|---|---|---|---|---|
| 1955–56 | St. Boniface Canadiens | MJHL | 23 | 1 | 9 | 10 | 99 | 4 | 2 | 1 | 3 | 27 |
| 1955–56 | St. Boniface Canadiens | M-Cup | — | — | — | — | — | 6 | 0 | 2 | 2 | 10 |
| 1956–57 | Fort William Canadiens | TBJHL | — | 9 | 16 | 25 | 133 | — | — | — | — | — |
| 1956–57 | Fort William Canadiens | M-Cup | — | — | — | — | — | 12 | 1 | 5 | 6 | 28 |
| 1956–57 | Flin Flon Bombers | M-Cup | — | — | — | — | — | 7 | 0 | 4 | 4 | 14 |
| 1957–58 | Kingston CKLCs | OHA Sr | 46 | 8 | 20 | 28 | 118 | 7 | 0 | 3 | 3 | 12 |
| 1958–59 | Hull-Ottawa Canadiens | OHA Sr | 52 | 5 | 5 | 10 | 110 | 8 | 2 | 3 | 5 | 29 |
| 1959–60 | Hull-Ottawa Canadiens | EPHL | 68 | 2 | 23 | 25 | 152 | 7 | 0 | 1 | 1 | 8 |
| 1960–61 | Montreal Canadiens | NHL | 4 | 0 | 1 | 1 | 8 | — | — | — | — | — |
| 1960–61 | Hull-Ottawa Canadiens | EPHL | 64 | 8 | 13 | 21 | 138 | 14 | 0 | 5 | 5 | 42 |
| 1961–62 | Montreal Canadiens | NHL | 12 | 0 | 1 | 1 | 10 | — | — | — | — | — |
| 1961–62 | Hull-Ottawa Canadiens | EPHL | 47 | 11 | 20 | 31 | 85 | 13 | 5 | 4 | 9 | 38 |
| 1962–63 | Montreal Canadiens | NHL | 65 | 1 | 17 | 18 | 46 | 5 | 0 | 0 | 0 | 12 |
| 1963–64 | Montreal Canadiens | NHL | 1 | 0 | 0 | 0 | 2 | — | — | — | — | — |
| 1963–64 | Quebec Aces | AHL | 29 | 3 | 7 | 10 | 58 | 9 | 1 | 2 | 3 | 4 |
| 1964–65 | Omaha Knights | CHL | 70 | 14 | 37 | 51 | 182 | 6 | 4 | 1 | 5 | 10 |
| 1964–65 | Montreal Canadiens | NHL | — | — | — | — | — | 2 | 0 | 0 | 0 | 4 |
| 1965–66 | Montreal Canadiens | NHL | 2 | 0 | 0 | 0 | 0 | — | — | — | — | — |
| 1965–66 | Quebec Aces | AHL | 3 | 0 | 0 | 0 | 2 | 6 | 0 | 3 | 3 | 4 |
| 1965–66 | Houston Apollos | CHL | 66 | 13 | 9 | 22 | 4 | — | — | — | — | — |
| 1966–67 | Montreal Canadiens | NHL | 2 | 0 | 0 | 0 | 2 | — | — | — | — | — |
| 1966–67 | Seattle Totems | WHL | 69 | 9 | 22 | 31 | 68 | 10 | 1 | 3 | 4 | 12 |
| 1967–68 | Philadelphia Flyers | NHL | 65 | 5 | 7 | 12 | 74 | 7 | 1 | 3 | 4 | 6 |
| 1968–69 | Boston Bruins | NHL | 11 | 0 | 2 | 2 | 8 | — | — | — | — | — |
| 1968–69 | Providence Reds | AHL | 39 | 5 | 14 | 19 | 58 | — | — | — | — | — |
| 1969–70 | Montreal Canadiens | NHL | 4 | 0 | 1 | 1 | 0 | — | — | — | — | — |
| 1969–70 | Montreal Voyageurs | AHL | 54 | 6 | 22 | 28 | 70 | 8 | 3 | 2 | 5 | 18 |
| 1970–71 | Montreal Voyageurs | AHL | 52 | 3 | 19 | 22 | 80 | 3 | 0 | 1 | 1 | 2 |
| 1971–72 | Baltimore Clippers | AHL | 64 | 3 | 37 | 40 | 104 | 18 | 5 | 7 | 12 | 38 |
| 1972–73 | New York Raiders | WHA | 31 | 2 | 1 | 3 | 21 | — | — | — | — | — |
| 1972–73 | Long Island Ducks | EHL | 4 | 1 | 1 | 2 | 10 | — | — | — | — | — |
| 1973–74 | Rochester Americans | AHL | 41 | 3 | 9 | 12 | 63 | 5 | 0 | 2 | 2 | 6 |
| WHA totals | | | 31 | 2 | 1 | 3 | 21 | — | — | — | — | — |
| NHL totals | | | 166 | 6 | 29 | 35 | 150 | 14 | 1 | 3 | 4 | 22 |
