= Thompson King Miners =

Manitoba former ice hockey team

- City: Thompson, Manitoba
- League: Manitoba Junior Hockey League; NorMan Junior Hockey League
- Operated: 1975-1985
- Home arena: C. A. Nesbitt Arena
- Colours: Orange, Black, and White
- General manager: unknown
- Head coach: unknown

The Thompson King Miners were a junior ice hockey team from Thompson, Manitoba, Canada. The King Miners were members of the Manitoba Junior Hockey League and the NorMan Junior Hockey League.

== History ==
The Thompson King Miners joined the Manitoba Junior Hockey League in 1975. After three rough seasons, the King Miners folded in 1978. One of the big problems for the team was that they were fairly remote compared to the rest of the teams in the MJHL due to their distance from Winnipeg, the central-point of the MJHL.

In the summer of 1978, the people of Thompson did not want to lose their Junior team, so along with the people of Flin Flon (who just dropped out of the Western Canada Junior Hockey League) formed a Junior B league (NorMan Junior Hockey League) with The Pas Huskies and the Snow Lake Spartans. Flin Flon would be the first league champion and eventually win the Manitoba Provincial Junior B Hockey Championship in 1979. In the summer of 1979, based on the strength of the Flin Flon and Thompson clubs, the league was promoted to Junior "A" to compete for the Centennial Cup. That first season of the NorMan League, the team would be known as the "Nickel Knights", but the name was soon dropped.

=== 1979–80 ===
The King Miners would win the first ever NorMan Junior "A" title by defeating the Flin Flon Bombers three games to none. They then faced the MJHL Champion for the Turnbull Cup, the Manitoba Junior Championship. The MJHL Champion Selkirk Steelers defeated them three games to none (6–2, 13–2, and 7–4) to move on to the Anavet Cup against the Saskatchewan Junior Hockey League champion.

=== 1980–81 ===
The King Miners take their second straight NJHL crown by defeating the Flin Flon Bombers four games to two, despite finishing second to them in the league standings. In the Turnbull Cup, the MJHL's St. Boniface Saints defeated them three games to none (6–4, 11–4, and 9–2) to move on to the Anavet Cup.

=== 1984–85 ===
After not winning the league for three straight seasons, the King Miners won what would be the last NJHL championship in 1985. At the Turnbull Cup, the Selkirk Steelers of the MJHL defeated them (8–3, 5–0, and 6–3) to move on to the Anavet Cup.

=== The End ===
With Flin Flon moving to the Saskatchewan Junior Hockey League in 1984, the NorMan League with Thompson, The Pas, and Snow Lake folded unceremoniously at the end of the 1984–85 season. Although there were attempts to expand the league into Saskatchewan, the league was never able to come back from the lack of teams and never played another season. This would be the end of Junior hockey in Thompson.

== Season-by-season standings ==
Season	GP	W	L	T	GF	GA	Points	Finish	Playoffs
1975–76	52	14	38	0	188	300	28	5th MJHL North	DNQ
1976–77	49	19	28	2	201	252	40	4th MJHL North	Lost div semi-final
1977–78 a	52	7	45	0	134	219	14	MJHL (Folded)	-
1978–79	22	6	14	2	108	–	14	2nd NJHL	Lost semi-final
1979–80	36	29	7	0	–	–	58	1st NJHL	Won League
1980–81	42	24	12	6	–	–	54	2nd NJHL	Won League
1981–85	Statistics Not Available

Note a: Withdrew from League Jan 9, 1978. 19 games were counted as default losses.

=== Playoffs ===
MJHL Years

- 1976 DNQ
- 1977 Lost quarter-final

Dauphin Kings defeated Thompson King Miners 4-games-to-none

- 1978 Did not compete Season

NJHL Years

- 1979 Lost final

Thompson King Miners defeated Snow Lake Spartans 13-goals-to-2 in 2 games
Flin Flon Bombers defeated Thompson King Miners

- 1980 Won League, lost Turnbull Cup

Thompson King Miners defeated Snow Lake Spartans 3-games-to-2
Thompson King Miners defeated Flin Flon Bombers 3-games-to-none NJHL CHAMPIONS
Selkirk Steelers (MJHL) defeated Thompson King Miners 3-games-to-none

- 1981 Won League, lost Turnbull Cup

Thompson King Miners defeated Snow Lake Spartans 4-games-to-none
Thompson King Miners defeated Flin Flon Bombers 4-games-to-2 NJHL CHAMPIONS
St. Boniface Saints (MJHL) defeated Thompson King Miners 3-games-to-none

- 1982 Lost final

Thompson King Miners defeated Snow Lake Spartans
Flin Flon Bombers defeated Thompson King Miners 4-games-to-none

- 1983 Possibly DNQ
- 1984 Lost final

Flin Flon Bombers defeated Thompson King Miners 4-games-to-3

- 1985 Won League, lost Turnbull Cup

Thompson King Miners defeated Snow Lake Spartans 4-games-to-1 NJHL CHAMPIONS
Selkirk Steelers (MJHL) defeated Thompson King Miners 3-games-to-none
