= NorMan Junior Hockey League =

Manitoba, Canada hockey League, 1978-1985

NorMan Junior Hockey League

Commissioner
Gordon Mitchell (1979–82)
Ron Chalmers (1982–83)
Rick Semeniuk (1984–85)
Founded
1978
Ceased
1985
Regional Jr. A Champions
0
National Jr. A Champions
0
Final Champion
Thompson King Miners (1985)

The NorMan Junior Hockey League (NJHL) was Junior A hockey league in Northern Manitoba, Canada from 1978 until 1985. The NJHL was a member of the Manitoba Amateur Hockey Association, a part of the Canadian Amateur Hockey Association.

The winner of the NJHL was allowed to compete against the champion of the Manitoba Junior Hockey League for the Turnbull Cup and a berth into the Centennial Cup national playdowns.

== History ==
The NJHL was formed in the summer of 1978 as a Junior B League which comprised the Flin Flon Bombers, Snow Lake Spartans, The Pas Lumber Kings and Thompson King Miners as a result of Flin Flon and Thompson seeking new leagues after leaving the Western Canada Junior Hockey League and Manitoba Junior Hockey League respectively.

Previously, Flin Flon had experimented with a Jr. B farm team when they were playing Major Junior and had won the 1978 Baldy Northcott Trophy as provincial champions. For the 1979–80 season, the league was promoted to Junior "A". Churchill, Manitoba was interested in expanding into the league in 1980, but the team never materialized.

During the 1981–82 season, the Flin Flon Bombers pulled off a perfect regular season record of 42 wins, no losses, and no ties. The Bombers were such a powerhouse in the NJHL that The Pas Huskies refused to play them in the league semi-finals. In the finals, the Bombers swept the Thompson King Miners in four games to claim the league title. Next was to challenge the Manitoba Junior Hockey League champion Fort Garry Blues. Much to the dismay of the Bombers, the Blues were from a much stronger league and crushed the Bombers in a 3-game sweep by scores of 11–2, 9–1, and 10–4.

In 1984, Flin Flon made the jump to the more talent-laden Saskatchewan Junior Hockey League. The NJHL survived one more season before folding. During the last season, there was interest from groups in Melfort and Nipawin, Saskatchewan to join the league but both were eventually granted franchises in the Saskatchewan Junior Hockey League. Cross Lake, Manitoba also showed interest in joining the league, but never did. In the final season, the Cranberry Portage Winter Hawks joined the league to help balance out the schedule. Additionally, the NJHL began the season with an interlocking schedule with the Kelsey Intermediate Hockey League, including the Thompson Hawks, Snow Lake North Stars, and Cross Lake Selects, but this schedule was complete cancelled in December when the Hawks and North Stars withdrew from the interlock. All results were thrown out at this point and the NJHL season was restarted.

Late in the 1984–85 season, The Pas left the league hoping to play Junior B. The finals were played between Thompson and Snow Lake, won by Thompson 4-games-to-1. In the summer the NJHL closed its doors. Thompson was still hopefully to play Junior A hockey in the region in 1986-87 or to play in the MJHL, but nothing ever transpired.

From 1980 until 1985, the champion of the NJHL played the winner of the MJHL for the Turnbull Cup, but never won a series.

== Teams ==
- Cranberry Portage Winter Hawks
- Flin Flon Bombers
- Snow Lake Spartans
- The Pas Huskies/Lumber Kings
- Thompson King Miners/Nickel Knights

== Standings ==
=== 1978-79 ===
Team                        GP   W    L    T   GF    GA    P
Flin Flon Bombers           24   20   2    2   210   --    42
Thompson Nickel Knights     22   6    14   2   108   --    14
Snow Lake Spartans          22   6    14   2   96    --    14

Please note: Final two games cancelled because they would not affect playoff setup.

=== 1979-80 ===
Team                        GP   W    L    T   GF    GA    P
Thompson King Miners        36   27    9   0   207  158    54
Flin Flon Bombers           36   22   12   2   221  201    46
Snow Lake Spartans          36   14   19   3   261  242    31
The Pas Lumber Kings        36    6   29   1   167  297    13    

=== 1980-81 ===
Team                        GP   W    L    T   GF    GA    P
Flin Flon Bombers           42   27   12   3   314   209   57
Thompson King Miners        42   24   12   6   290   233   54
The Pas Lumber Kings        42   15   25   2   244   322   32
Snow Lake Spartans          42    9   26   7   225   309   25

=== 1981-82 ===
Team                        GP   W    L    T   GF    GA    P
Flin Flon Bombers           42   42   0    0   544   146   84
Thompson King Miners        37   17   17   3   267   256   37
The Pas Huskies             38   14   23   1   253   319   29       
Snow Lake Spartans          38   3    29   4   161   253   10

== Champions ==
Year	Champion	Finalist
1979	Flin Flon Bombers	Snow Lake Spartans
1980	Thompson King Miners	Flin Flon Bombers
1981	Thompson King Miners	Flin Flon Bombers
1982	Flin Flon Bombers	Thompson King Miners
1983	The Pas Huskies	Flin Flon Bombers
1984	Flin Flon Bombers	Thompson King Miners
1985	Thompson King Miners	Snow Lake Spartans
