= 2001 Royal Bank Cup =

Tournament details
- Venue(s): Whitney Forum in Flin Flon, Manitoba
- Dates: May 5, 2001 – May 12, 2001
- Teams: 5

Final positions
- Champions: Camrose Kodiaks (1st title)
- Runners-up: Flin Flon Bombers

Tournament statistics
- Games played: 13
- Scoring leader: Darrell Stoddard (Camrose)

Awards
- MVP: Darrell Stoddard (Camrose)

The 2001 Royal Bank Cup is the 31st Junior "A" 2001 ice hockey National Championship for the Canadian Junior A Hockey League.

The Royal Bank Cup was competed for by the winners of the Doyle Cup, Anavet Cup, Dudley Hewitt Cup, the Fred Page Cup and a host city.

The tournament was hosted by the Flin Flon Bombers and Flin Flon, Manitoba.

== The Playoffs ==
=== Round Robin ===
Pos	League (Ticket)	Team	Pld	W	L	GF	GA	GD	Qualification
1	AJHL (Doyle Cup)	Camrose Kodiaks	4	4	0	17	8	+9	Semi-final
2	SJHL (Anavet Cup)	Weyburn Red Wings	4	3	1	22	10	+12	Semi-final
3	SJHL (Host)	Flin Flon Bombers	4	2	2	14	15	−1	Semi-final
4	LHJAAAQ (Fred Page Cup)	St. Jerome Panthers	4	1	3	11	22	−11	Semi-final
5	OPJHL (Dudley Hewitt Cup)	Thornhill Rattlers	4	0	4	10	19	−9	

==== Results ====
Flin Flon Bombers defeat St. Jerome Panthers 6-2
Camrose Kodiaks defeat Thornhill Rattlers 4-1
Weyburn Red Wings defeat Flin Flon Bombers 6-2
St. Jerome Panthers defeat Thornhill Rattlers 5-4
Camrose Kodiaks defeat Weyburn Red Wings 4-3
Camrose Kodiaks defeat Flin Flon Bombers 5-1
Weyburn Red Wings defeat St. Jerome Panthers 8-1
Flin Flon Bombers defeat Thornhill Rattlers 5-2
Camrose Kodiaks defeat St. Jerome Panthers 4-3
Weyburn Red Wings defeat Thornhill Rattlers 5-3

=== Semi and Finals ===
Semi-finals
1	Camrose Kodiaks	7
4	St. Jerome Panthers	1
2	Weyburn Red Wings	0
3	Flin Flon Bombers	4

Royal Bank Cup Finals
1	Camrose Kodiaks	5
3	Flin Flon Bombers	0

== Awards ==
Most Valuable Player: Darrell Stoddard (Camrose Kodiaks)
Top Scorer: Darrell Stoddard (Camrose Kodiaks)
Most Sportsmanlike Player: Mark Debusschere (Flin Flon Bombers)
Top Goalie: Scott Galenza (Camrose Kodiaks)
Top Forward: Jason Vermeulen (Weyburn Red Wings)
Top Defenceman: James Laux (Weyburn Red Wings)

== Roll of League Champions ==
AJHL: Camrose Kodiaks
BCHL: Victoria Salsa
CJHL: Cornwall Colts
MJHL: OCN Blizzard
MJAHL: Antigonish Bulldogs
NOJHL: Rayside-Balfour Sabrecats
OPJHL: Thornhill Rattlers
QJAAAHL: St. Jerome Panthers
SJHL: Weyburn Red Wings

== See also ==
- Canadian Junior A Hockey League
- Royal Bank Cup
- Anavet Cup
- Doyle Cup
- Dudley Hewitt Cup
- Fred Page Cup
