= Duane Rupp =

Canadian ice hockey player (born 1938)

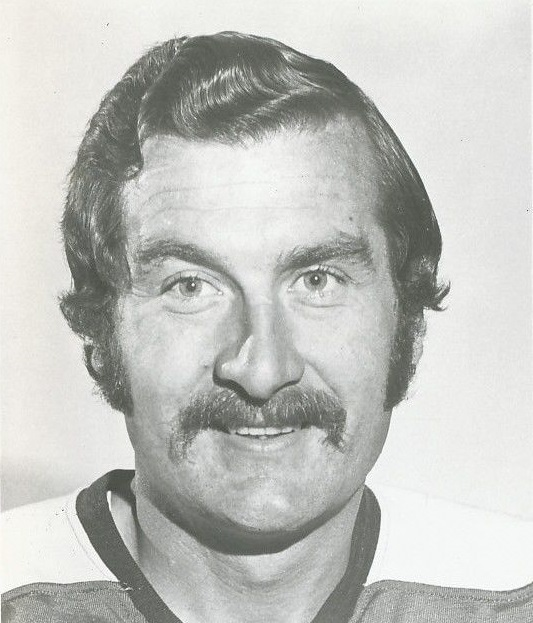
- Rupp in 1974
- Born: March 29, 1938 (age 88) MacNutt, Saskatchewan, Canada
- Height: 6 ft 1 in (185 cm)
- Weight: 195 lb (88 kg; 13 st 13 lb)
- Position: Defence
- Shot: Left
- Played for: New York Rangers; Toronto Maple Leafs; Minnesota North Stars; Pittsburgh Penguins; Vancouver Blazers; Calgary Cowboys
- Playing career: 1958–1977

Duane Edward Franklin Rupp (born March 29, 1938) is a Canadian former professional ice hockey defenceman. He played in the National Hockey League from 1963 to 1973 and then in the World Hockey Association from 1974 to 1976.

== Playing career ==
Rupp started his National Hockey League career with the New York Rangers. He would also play with the Toronto Maple Leafs, Minnesota North Stars, and the Pittsburgh Penguins. His NHL career would last from 1963 to 1973.

After playing the 1973–74 season with the Hershey Bears of the American Hockey League (AHL), Rupp played for two seasons with the Vancouver Blazers and Calgary Cowboys in the World Hockey Association before concluding his career in 1977 with the Rochester Americans of the AHL.

He was inducted into the Manitoba Hockey Hall of Fame.

== Post-playing career ==
After his retirement as a player, Rupp owned a sporting goods shop in Pittsburgh.

== Career statistics ==
=== Regular season and playoffs ===
			Regular season					Playoffs
Season	Team	League	GP	G	A	Pts	PIM	GP	G	A	Pts	PIM
1955–56	Melville Millionaires	SJHL	1	0	1	1	0	—	—	—	—	—
1956–57	Flin Flon Bombers	SJHL	55	4	20	24	20	10	2	1	3	2
1956–57	Flin Flon Bombers	M-Cup	—	—	—	—	—	17	0	1	1	8
1957–58	Flin Flon Bombers	SJHL	55	9	25	34	27	12	0	0	0	4
1958–59	Fort Wayne Komets	IHL	56	5	11	16	22	11	0	1	1	11
1959–60	Fort Wayne Komets	IHL	67	10	44	54	22	13	1	6	7	8
1960–6	Kitchener Beavers	EPHL	69	10	14	24	26	7	1	1	2	6
1961–62	Springfield Indians	AHL	27	7	9	16	10	—	—	—	—	—
1961–62	Vancouver Canucks	WHL	35	3	13	16	14	—	—	—	—	—
1962–63	New York Rangers	NHL	2	0	0	0	0	—	—	—	—	—
1962–63	Baltimore Clippers	AHL	71	4	17	21	42	3	0	2	2	11
1963–64	Baltimore Clippers	AHL	61	2	9	11	65	—	—	—	—	—
1963–64	Rochester Americans	AHL	15	1	4	5	16	2	0	1	1	0
1964–65	Toronto Maple Leafs	NHL	2	0	0	0	0	—	—	—	—	—
1964–65	Rochester Americans	AHL	71	4	30	34	50	10	1	7	8	18
1965–66	Toronto Maple Leafs	NHL	2	0	1	1	0	—	—	—	—	—
1965–66	Rochester Americans	AHL	70	7	34	41	86	12	0	8	8	30
1966–67	Toronto Maple Leafs	NHL	3	0	0	0	0	—	—	—	—	—
1966–67	Rochester Americans	AHL	59	7	35	42	84	13	0	5	5	13
1967–68	Toronto Maple Leafs	NHL	71	1	8	9	42	—	—	—	—	—
1968–69	Minnesota North Stars	NHL	29	2	1	3	8	—	—	—	—	—
1968–69	Pittsburgh Penguins	NHL	30	3	10	13	24	—	—	—	—	—
1968–69	Cleveland Barons	AHL	13	3	6	9	38	—	—	—	—	—
1969–70	Pittsburgh Penguins	NHL	64	2	14	16	18	6	2	2	4	2
1970–71	Pittsburgh Penguins	NHL	59	5	28	33	34	—	—	—	—	—
1971–72	Pittsburgh Penguins	NHL	34	4	18	22	32	4	0	0	0	6
1971–72	Hershey Bears	AHL	38	2	21	23	36	—	—	—	—	—
1972–73	Pittsburgh Penguins	NHL	78	7	13	20	62	—	—	—	—	—
1973–74	Hershey Bears	AHL	67	7	27	34	32	14	1	5	6	8
1974–75	Vancouver Blazers	WHA	72	3	26	29	45	—	—	—	—	—
1975–76	Calgary Cowboys	WHA	42	0	16	16	33	7	0	2	2	8
1975–76	Rochester Americans	AHL	4	1	6	7	2	2	0	0	0	0
1976–77	Rochester Americans	AHL	41	3	8	11	12	—	—	—	—	—
WHA totals			114	3	42	45	78	7	0	2	2	8
NHL totals			374	24	93	117	220	10	2	2	4	8

== Awards and achievements ==
- Memorial Cup Championship (1957)
- AHL Second All-Star Team (1966, 1967, 1974)
- Played in NHL All-Star Game (1968)
- First defenceman to score a hat trick in Pittsburgh Penguin team history.
- Calder Cup (AHL) Championship (1974)
- Honoured Member of the Manitoba Hockey Hall of Fame
