= Dennis Polonich =

Canadian ice hockey player (born 1953)

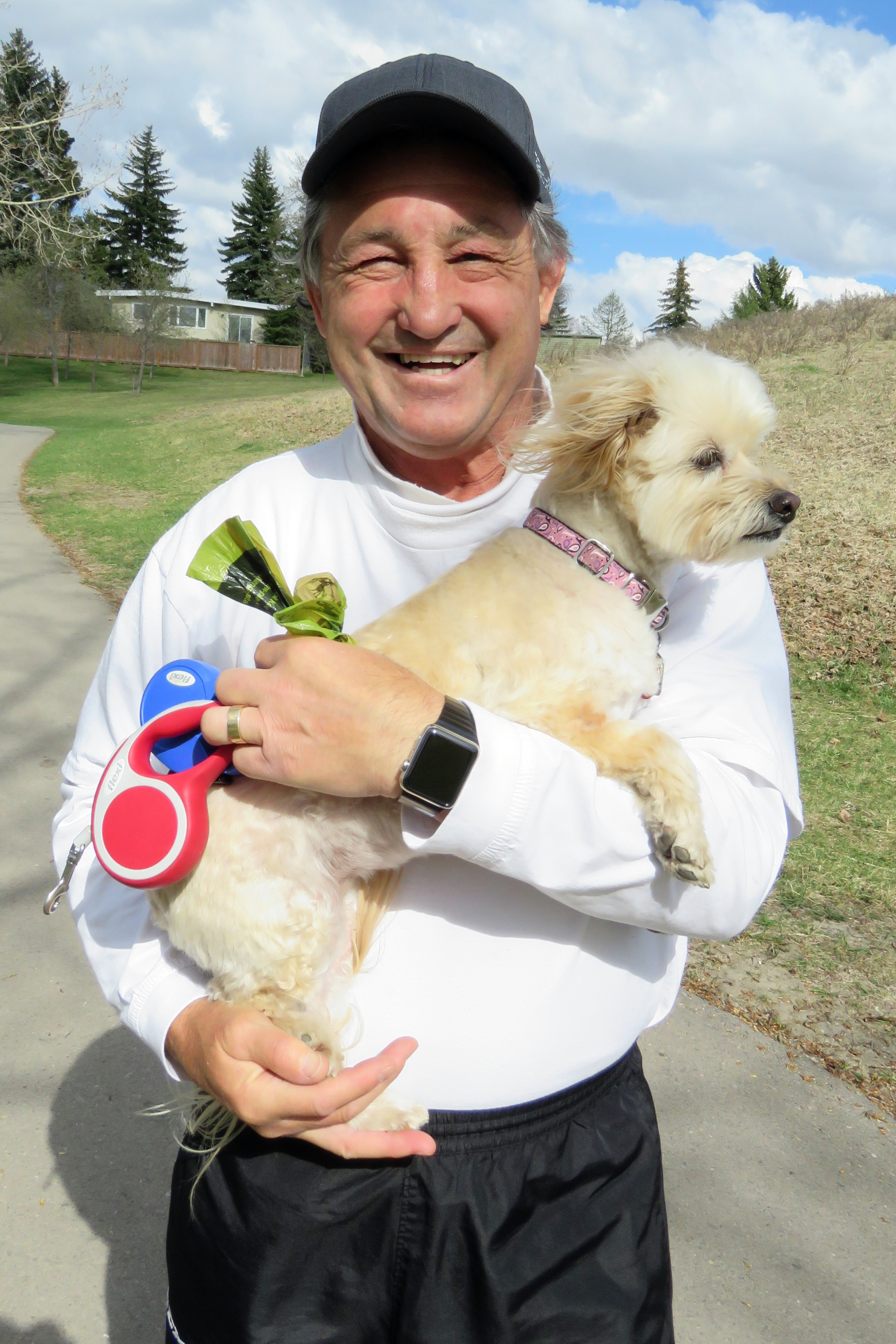
- Polonich in 2017.
- Born: December 4, 1953 (age 72) Foam Lake, Saskatchewan, Canada
- Height: 5 ft 6 in (168 cm)
- Weight: 166 lb (75 kg; 11 st 12 lb)
- Position: Centre/Right wing
- Shot: Right
- Played for: Detroit Red Wings
- NHL draft: 118th overall, 1973; Detroit Red Wings
- Playing career: 1973–1987

Dennis Daniel "Polo" Polonich (born December 4, 1953) is a Canadian former professional ice hockey centre who spent his entire National Hockey League (NHL) career with the Detroit Red Wings. He was selected in the eighth round, 118th overall, by the Detroit Red Wings in the 1973 NHL Amateur Draft. Polonich was the first NHL player to be awarded damages from a civil suit for an on-ice incident.

== Playing career ==
=== Junior hockey ===
Standing only five feet, six inches, and while playing for the Flin Flon Bombers of the Western Canadian Hockey League, Polonich attracted attention of scouts by being a pest, antagonizing opposing players while scoring occasional goals. During the 1972–73 season Polonich was known for his relentless trash-talking, and racked up 222 penalty minutes along with 74 points. Polonich was drafted 118th by the Detroit Red Wings in 1973. However, the Wings wanted to see if Polonich could be as effective in a higher-level league, and sent him play a season with the London Lions in Britain. He impressed and was brought back for the 1974–75 season. Polonich signed his first professional contract with a $7,500 signing bonus and salary of $55,000 if he made the Detroit Red Wings, or $15,500 if he played in the minors.

=== Professional hockey ===
In the 1974–75 season, Polonich joined the Virginia Wings of the American Hockey League (AHL). He led the Wings in penalty minutes, and his 34 points helped them reach the playoffs, where he was the team's leading scorer in their short playoff appearance. Towards the end of the regular season, Polonich joined the Red Wings for his first four NHL games, recording no points or penalty minutes. After a quick stint with the Kalamazoo Wings of the International Hockey League (IHL), Polonich became a full-time Red Wing in the 1975–76 NHL season. The Red Wings were retooling, adding toughness and grit to their roster after a few disappointing seasons and Polonich fit the bill. Although small, Polonich brought an instant force to the team. Polonich set a club record on March 24, 1976 by sitting out eight penalties – five minors, a major and a misconduct. Polonich became the first rookie to be penalized more than 300 minutes in one season.

"If I had stayed out of the box a little more, I might have scored 20 or 25 goals, you have to have a mighty long stick to score from the penalty box."

In the 1976–77 NHL season Polonich had a short tenure as captain of the Detroit Red Wings while Danny Grant was injured. He finished second in team scoring with 46 points and led the team (second in the league behind Tiger Williams) in penalty minutes with 274. He again led the team in penalty minutes the following season.

On October 25, 1978, Polonich got under the skin of the Colorado Rockies' Wilf Paiement. In what has been termed as the worst-ever case of brutality in the NHL, Paiement smashed the diminutive Polonich across the face with his stick, leaving Polonich with a concussion, severe facial lacerations, and a broken nose requiring reconstructive surgery. Paiement argued that Polonich had intentionally struck him with his stick in the follow-through of a slap shot. Wayne County Prosecutor's Office investigated the incident and decided not to prosecute Paiement. Polonich missed about 20 games due to the incident.

In 1982, Polonich filed a civil suit against Paiement in U.S. Federal Court before Judge Horace Weldon Gilmore. Prior to proceeding to court a Wayne County mediation panel recommended a settlement of $85,000, which Polonich accepted, however the Colorado Rockies' insurance company countered with $50,000 which Polonich refused. Judge Gilmore did not allow evidence to be heard about Polonich's penalty-filled career and physical style of play. Ultimately Polonich was awarded $500,000 for "pain and suffering" and $350,000 in punitive damages which would be paid by Paiement and not be covered by the Colorado Rockies' insurance.

Polonich suffered from breathing problems for the remainder of his career. The Detroit Red Wings general ganager Ted Lindsay testified at the trial that Paiement hit Polonich with a baseball-type swing. Wilf Paiement was fined $500 (the maximum permitted under NHL rules) and suspended by the NHL for 15 games, the longest NHL suspension since the beginning of the "Original Six" era.

Polonich's career would taper off following the incident, playing just 109 more NHL games with 4 goals during that time, compared to the 55 goals in his previous 277 NHL games.

After five and a half seasons with the Red Wings, Polonich was sent down to the AHL after the 1980–81 season and, besides 11 games in 1982, remained there. He helped the Adirondack Red Wings reach the playoffs twice, winning the Calder Cup in 1981, in the following four years before jumping to the Muskegon Lumberjacks of the IHL. Polonich retired in 1987 one year after winning the Turner Cup.

== Post-playing career ==
Following his retirement from professional hockey, Polonich was hired as the General Manager and Head Coach of the Yorkton Terriers of the Saskatchewan Junior Hockey League (SJHL) in the middle of the 1986-87 season, a position he held for six seasons. Polonich was named the SJHL Coach of the Year in 1987-88, and with the Terriers lost the SJHL championship in the 1989-90 season, and followed that with a SJHL championship in 1990-91 and winning the ANAVET Cup. Polonich made the jump to the Western Hockey League in 1992 when he was hired as the General Manager of the Medicine Hat Tigers. Polonich spent four seasons with the Tigers until he was hired on the Prince George Cougars as General Manager in 1996, a position he held for two seasons.

Polonich became a player agent following his hockey management career.

Polonich played in the 2009 NHL Winter Classic alumni game.

== Records ==
- Red Wings club record: Sitting out eight penalties in one game - five minors, a major and a misconduct. (1976)

== Career statistics ==
			Regular season					Playoffs
Season	Team	League	GP	G	A	Pts	PIM	GP	G	A	Pts	PIM
1971–72	Flin Flon Bombers	WCJHL	65	9	21	30	200	7	0	1	1	41
1972–73	Flin Flon Bombers	WCJHL	68	26	48	74	222	9	1	5	6	38
1973–74	London Lions	Britain	67	17	43	60	57	—	—	—	—	—
1974–75	Detroit Red Wings	NHL	4	0	0	0	0	—	—	—	—	—
1974–75	Virginia Wings	AHL	60	14	20	34	194	5	0	2	2	30
1975–76	Detroit Red Wings	NHL	57	11	12	23	302	—	—	—	—	—
1975–76	Kalamazoo Wings	IHL	5	1	8	9	32	—	—	—	—	—
1976–77	Detroit Red Wings	NHL	79	18	28	46	274	—	—	—	—	—
1977–78	Detroit Red Wings	NHL	79	16	19	35	254	7	1	0	1	19
1978–79	Detroit Red Wings	NHL	62	10	12	22	208	—	—	—	—	—
1979–80	Detroit Red Wings	NHL	66	2	8	10	127	—	—	—	—	—
1980–81	Detroit Red Wings	NHL	32	2	2	4	77	—	—	—	—	—
1980–81	Adirondack Red Wings	AHL	40	16	13	29	99	14	9	5	14	95
1981–82	Adirondack Red Wings	AHL	80	30	26	56	202	5	2	2	4	0
1982–83	Detroit Red Wings	NHL	11	0	1	1	0	—	—	—	—	—
1982–83	Adirondack Red Wings	AHL	61	18	22	40	128	6	2	2	4	10
1983–84	Adirondack Red Wings	AHL	66	14	26	40	122	—	—	—	—	—
1984–85	Adirondack Red Wings	AHL	53	18	17	35	133	—	—	—	—	—
1985–86	Muskegon Lumberjacks	IHL	78	32	36	68	222	14	8	10	18	36
1986–87	Muskegon Lumberjacks	IHL	22	2	9	11	24	—	—	—	—	—
NHL totals			390	59	82	141	1242	7	1	0	1	19
AHL totals			360	110	124	234	878	30	13	11	24	135

Preceded by Danny Grant	Detroit Red Wings captain 1976–77	Succeeded by Danny Grant
