= Pat Ginnell =

Canadian ice hockey player and coach (1937–2003)

- Born: March 3, 1937 Dauphin, Manitoba, Canada
- Died: November 17, 2003 (aged 66) Vernon, British Columbia, Canada
- Height: 6 ft 0 in (183 cm)
- Weight: 180 lb (82 kg; 12 st 12 lb)
- Position: Right wing
- Shot: Left
- Played for: WHL; Edmonton Flyers; Vancouver Canucks; Seattle Totems; Portland Buckaroos; Victoria Cougars; IHL; Troy Bruins; Omaha Knights; Des Moines Oak Leafs
- Playing career: 1957–1966

Patrick "Paddy" Ginnell (March 3, 1937 – November 17, 2003) was a Canadian professional ice hockey player and junior league coach.

== Career ==
=== Playing career ===
Ginnell played a total of ten seasons professionally in the Western Hockey League and International Hockey League. While playing with the Flin Flon Bombers, he led them to a 64-9-2 record and won the 1957 Memorial Cup.

=== Coaching career ===
After his playing career ended, he coached for the next twenty years in the Western Hockey League for the Flin Flon Bombers, Victoria Cougars, Lethbridge Broncos, Medicine Hat Tigers and New Westminster Bruins.

In 1974, he left the Flin Flon Bombers for the Victoria Cougars and had a first season record of 16-19-3. After seeing an increase in attendance once the team was winning, Ginnell signed a broadcasting contract and developed a plan to increase season ticket sales. However, his career with the Victoria Cougars came to an end after a brawl between his team and the Saskatoon Blades, although he remained their owner.

He was a scout for the St. Louis Blues after his coaching career came to an end.

== Personal life ==
He died at age 66 after a long battle with cancer. His oldest son Kevin played 4 seasons in the WHL and was a 5th round selection of the Chicago Blackhawks in 1980. After his junior career he switched to coaching, and spent a season in the AJHL before a dozen in the SJHL. After the 1994-95 season, at the age of 33, he left coaching in order to attend university, thus fulfilling the promise he had made to his mother. Dr. Ginnell went on to leave an indelible impression in the world of academia as a professor at Simon Fraser University and Douglas College. Paddy’s two younger sons Dan and Erin are both long time NHL scouts. His grandson Riley Ginnell has played with the Moose Jaw Warriors in the WHL. His other grandchildren Brad Ginnell and Derek Ginnell also play hockey.

== Awards and honours ==
- WCHL Coach of the Year Award – 1969–70, 1970–71, 1972–73, 1974–75
- Manitoba Hockey Hall of Fame honoured member
