= Whitney Forum =

Ice hockey arena in Flin Flon, Manitoba

Coordinates: 54.7674°N 101.8656°W

The Whitney Forum is an ice hockey arena located in Flin Flon, Manitoba, Canada. It is home to the Flin Flon Bombers of the Saskatchewan Junior Hockey League.

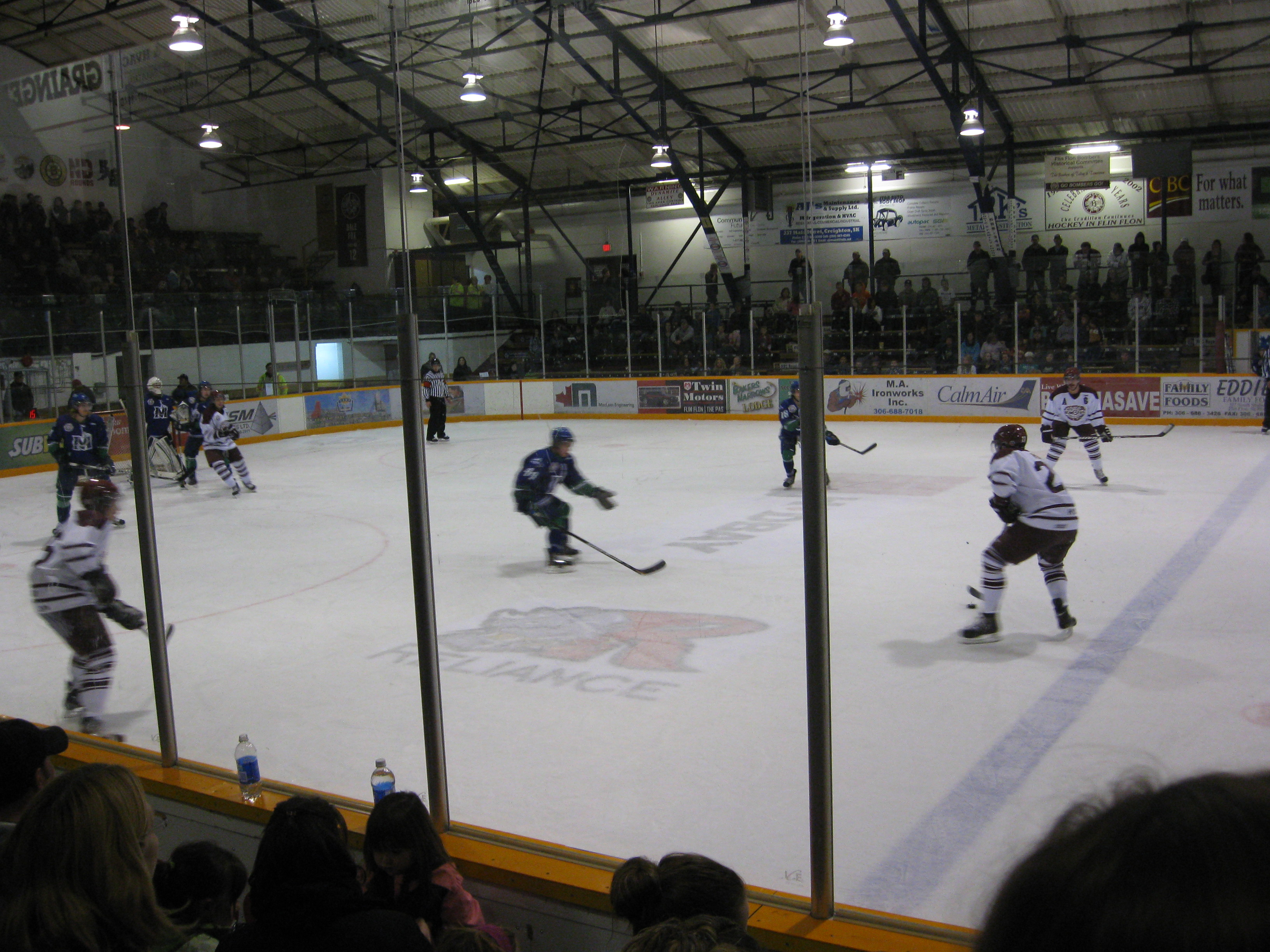

The Whitney Forum opened in 1958 and has seating capacity for 1,650 spectators. Like many arenas built during that era, the dimensions of its ice surface, at 187 by 80 feet, are smaller than regulation. Over the years, the arena has undergone many renovations, including additions of new dressing rooms, ice plant upgrades, new rink boards, and structural upgrades.

The Whitney Forum was the host venue for the 2001 Royal Bank Cup.
