= Prince Albert Mintos =

Canadian ice hockey team

The Prince Albert Mintos are a Canadian ice hockey team that plays in the Saskatchewan Male U18 AAA Hockey League (SMAAAHL). Their home rink is the Art Hauser Centre (formerly known as the Communiplex). The Prince Albert Mintos won the Telus Cup and Western Canadian Regionals back to back years starting in the 2005–2006 season and 2006–2007 year. They won the Telus Cup and Western Canadian Regionals for the third time in 2013–2014 season.

== History ==
=== 1800s–1911 ===
The Mintos team is named after a district in Scotland. But back in the 19th century, the land was controlled by a baron without a proper name of distinction. They decided to call him the Earle of Minto, or Lord Minto.

In 1884 the fourth Earle of Minto was working together with General Middleton in the Riel rebellion before being named governor general of Canada in 1904.

The Stanley Cup was provided by Lord Stanley at around this time period, as well as the Grey Cup.

At this time the Minto Cup was made by Lord Minto, which is still a junior national lacrosse trophy. The link wasn’t just between politicians and trophies, but between politicians and teams as well.

In 1909, there was a senior hockey team in Prince Albert and they called themselves the Mintos. The Mintos were then allowed to compete for the Stanley Cup in 1911 due to being deemed as a professional teams as they had to paid players on the roster.

The Mintos went to Winnipeg in 1911 and played off against Port Arthur, winners of the New Ontario Hockey League. They fell in defeat in straight games. Port Arthur would go on to lose a challenge series for the Stanley Cup to the Ottawa Senators of the National Hockey Association.

The Mintos senior team would stay afloat until the 1930s, then changed into a junior team.

=== 1912 ===
The Mintos franchise in 1912 had seven men made up the team that season. They were: Bruce Wright, Archie MacDonald, Jim Sims, Jim Leach, Gordon Forbes, and Alf Holman. They would go on to fight Melville for the Allan Cup. The end result was that the Melville beat the Mintos 9–8 and it was the closest any Prince Albert hockey team would come to winning the Allan Cup.

=== 1928 ===
The Mintos team would make its mark in 1928. It consisted of Larivell, Valois, Ashwin, Woodman, Hoffman, and Sinclair. According to the city of Prince Albert website, the match to remember was the night they played the Moose Jaw Maroons for the Henderson Cup. Around 1,800 jam packed the old Mintos Arena, which was located on the west end of Prince Albert by the old railroad bridge. Fans unable to get seats inside the stadium almost completely tore down the south wall of the arena in order to watch the memorial struggle. The Mintos would go on to beat the Maroons 6–4 and claim the Henderson Cup.

=== 1932–1933 ===
Four years later in the 1932–1933 hockey season the Mintos consisted of George Freeland, Scotty Milne, Mac MacFee, Red Hemmerling, George Freeland, Al Fowlie, Todd Klein, Bob McQuarrie, Jack Brown, Jack Dundas, Don Deacon, and Fred Mosher. This Minto teams was the third team to represent Prince Albert and area with distinction. This team would win the Northern League but they would fall in defeat to Regina in the playoffs, who would go on to win the Allan Cup.

=== 1949–1950 ===
The next Mintos team would see action in the 1949–1950 season. The roster at that time included: Wayne Stephenson, Joe Palyga, Ron Clearwater, Hermie Merkowsky, Jim Wilson, Herb Jeffery, Chuck Holdaway, Harry Harasyn, Jack Drew, Don Crawford, and Bill Hunter. This would be one of the best Mintos teams to date that Prince Albert had. They would go on to win the Northerns by beating Flin Flon in three straight games. They would even go as far as winning the British Columbia and Alberta championships.

=== Late 1940s–1960s ===
In the time period of the late 1940s to the 1960s, they were a Junior A hockey team and played in the Saskatchewan Junior Hockey League (SJHL).

The 1960–1961 roster included the first French speaking Quebecer ever to have played in the SJHL. His name was Jacques Beaulieu and came from Trois-Rivières, Quebec. Some of his linemates included Pat Donnely, Nick Balon and Jim Neilson, who had a great career with the New York Rangers.

=== 1961 fire of Minto Arena ===
An arena was built in Prince Albert in the mid-20th century and decided to call it Minto Arena. Minto Arena burned down in 1961 and without adequate funds to build another there would be no Mintos in Prince Albert for ten years.

=== 1972 ===
The present day Western Hockey League franchise of the Prince Albert Raiders were formed as a provincial Junior A team in 1972. A contest was then held to pick a name for the name the team. The winner was in fact Mintos. Due to a gentleman buying the original Mintos club, they changed the name to Raiders which was the second name. After a number of years a couple of local men were granted permission to start a team, which they called the Prince Albert Midget Raider Mintos.

The reason the Raider name was in there is because the original Midget AAA hockey team was administered by the Junior Raiders team.

=== 1995 ===
In 1995, the minor hockey association of Prince Albert took over the Mintos Midget team and the Raiders name was dropped, making them the Prince Albert AAA Midget Mintos.

The Midget AAA Mintos have not been in operation all that long, but the Mintos name has been in Prince Albert since 1909

=== 2005–2006 ===
In the 2005–2006 hockey season, the Mintos finished second in the SMAAAHL with an overall record of 31–9–3–1 en route to their first Saskatchewan Major AAA Hockey League title in franchise history. They lost twice in the playoffs en route to winning the provincial title. At the Western Regional Championships they went undefeated and earned the right to represent Western Canada at the 2006 Telus Cup, the Canadian National Midget AAA hockey tournament held in Charlottetown, Prince Edward Island. Throughout the round robin and playoff portions of the tournament they finished undefeated and earned a spot in the tournament final. The Mintos defeated the Pacific Regional representatives, the Calgary Buffaloes, in triple overtime by a score of 5–4. Ron Myers, the captain during the 2005–2006 season, recorded the overtime game-winning goal.

Assistant Mintos captain for the 2005–2006 season Matthew Robertson was awarded the top forward at the Telus Cup. Robertson scored 12 goals, breaking the previous record held by Sidney Crosby. Crosby scored 11 goals at the 2002 tournament (known as the Air Canada Cup at the time) as a member of the Dartmouth Subways. Robertson scored 33 per cent of the Mintos' 39 goals while Crosby only scored 30 per cent of his team's.

=== 2006–2007 ===
In the 2006–2007 campaign, the Mintos finished the season with a record of 35–7–1–1, an improvement over their record from the previous season. The Mintos finished the playoffs with a 9–4 record and won the provincial Saskatchewan Midget AAA Hockey title for the second consecutive season. They went on to the Western Regional Championships and once again remained undefeated, leading to a berth in the 2007 Telus Cup, held in Red Deer, Alberta. The Mintos faced the host Red Deer Optimist Rebels, and won the final game by a score of 3–2 in double overtime, with the goal being scored by forward Ryan Fox, of Creighton, Saskatchewan. With their victory, the Mintos became the first team in the history of the national championship to win in consecutive seasons. They also extended their Telus Cup record undefeated streak to 14 games.

=== 2014 ===
The Mintos won the 2014 Telus Cup. They beat the Chateauguay Grenadiers in triple overtime. It marks the longest game in Telus Cup history at 108 minutes and 36 seconds. This is also the third national championship for the Mintos.

== NHL alumni ==
These are the former Prince Albert Mintos alumni who either signed with a team in or went on to play in the NHL.

- Kelly Guard
- Connor Ingram
- Josh Manson
- Robyn Regehr
- Dustin Tokarski

== The Rebellion Hockey / Optimist Ice Mania Tournament ==
Since 1986, Ice Mania has been running in Prince Albert for AAA midget hockey. Teams from all over Western Canada compete in this event.

=== Ice Mania winners ===
- 1986 – Notre Dame Hounds
- 1987 – Edmonton Leafs
- 1988 – Prince Albert Midget Raiders
- 1989 – Medicine Hat Tigers
- 1990 – Calgary Buffaloes
- 1991 – Sherwood Park
- 1992 – Pembina Valley Hawks
- 1993 – Saskatoon Blazers
- 1994 – Saskatoon Contacts
- 1995 – Saskatoon Blazers
- 1996 – Saskatoon Blazers
- 1997 – Calgary Flames
- 1998 – Pembina Valley Hawks
- 1999 – Leduc Autoworld Oil Kings
- 2000 – Beardy's Blackhawks
- 2001 – Tisdale Trojans
- 2002 – Tisdale Trojans
- 2003 – Tisdale Trojans
- 2004 – Notre Dame Hounds
- 2005 – Notre Dame Hounds
- 2006 – Moose Jaw Warriors
- 2007 – Lethbridge Y's Men

=== Ice Mania awards ===
These are the awards given out annually at the Ice Mania tournament. Sponsored By Rebellion Hockey Canada Legend: Name, Number, Team, Year

==== Top Goaltender ====
- Jordan Ramstead – 35 – Leduc Oil Kings – 2001
- Mark Kehrig – 25 – Tisdale Trojans – 2002
- Real Cyr – 35 – Prince Albert Mintos – 2003
- Kent Morrison – 35 – Moose Jaw Warriors – 2004
- Kieran Millan – 1 – Edmonton Gregg Dist – 2005
- Matt Weninger – 1 – Lethbridge Titans – 2006

==== Top Defencemen ====
- Brett Carson – 6 – Yorkton Parkland Mallers – 2001
- Bretton Stamler – 7 – Sherwood Park Kings – 2002
- Ryan White – 7 – Edmonton CAC Gregg – 2003
- David Filiou – 5 – Notre Dame Hounds – 2004
- Tommy Brown – 10 – Prince Albert Mintos – 2005
- Bo Montgomery – 2 – Moose Jaw Warriors – 2006

==== Most Sportsmanlike Player ====
- Josh Sim – 29 – Beardy's Blackhawks – 2001
- Brad Erickson – 10 – Saskatoon Blazers – 2002
- Matt Hill – 10 – Tisdale Trojans – 2003
- Taylor Procyshen – 21 – Moose Jaw Warriors – 2004
- Torrey Lindsay – 20 – Interlake Lightning – 2005
- Pat Sitko – 18 – Notre Dame Hounds – 2006

==== Top Scorer ====
- Kurtis Kisio – 11 – Calgary Flames – 2001
- Brad Cooper – 12 – Dallas AAA Stars – 2002
- Jeff Swain – 19 – Beardy's Blackhawks – 2003
- Matthew Robertson – 15 – Prince Albert Mintos – 2004
- Dustyn Clegg – 12 – Interlake Lightning – 2005
- Braden Pimm – 11 – Notre Dame Hounds – 2006

==== Most Valuable Player ====
- Tommy Green – 26 – Saskatoon Blazers – 2001
- Brad Cooper – 12 – Dallas AAA Stars – 2002
- Jordan Knackstedt – 20 – Beardys Blackhawks – 2003
- Collin Long – 9 – California Wave – 2004
- Keldon Sanderson – 55 – Beardy's Blackhawks – 2005
- Michael Small – 9 – Edmonton SSAC – 2006

== Results ==
=== Exhibition results ===
Legend:
T = Tie, OTL = Overtime Loss

| Season | Games | Won | Lost | T | OTL | Points | Goals For | Goals Against | Standing |
|---|---|---|---|---|---|---|---|---|---|
| 2005–06 | 8 | 4 | 2 | 2 | 0 | 6 | 35 | 21 | - |
| 2006–07 | 8 | 6 | 1 | 1 | 0 | 13 | 42 | 15 | - |
| 2008–09 | 6 | 4 | 2 | 0 | 0 | 8 | 26 | 20 | - |

=== Regular season results ===
Legend:
T = Tie, OTL = Overtime Loss, SOL = Shootout Loss

| Season | Games | Won | Lost | T | OTL | SOL | Points | Goals For | Goals Against | Standing | Playoffs |
|---|---|---|---|---|---|---|---|---|---|---|---|
| 2003–04 | 44 | 26 | 11 | 2 | 1 | – | 49 | 193 | 131 | ? | Lost in second round |
| 2005–06 | 44 | 31 | 9 | 3 | 1 | 0 | 63 | 152 | 103 | 2nd | Won league championship, regionals, and Telus Cup |
| 2006–07 | 44 | 35 | 7 | 1 | 1 | 0 | 71 | 181 | 149 | ? | Won league championship, regionals, and Telus Cup |
| 2007–08 | 44 | 26 | 12 | 4 | 2 | 0 | 48 | 183 | 145 | 2nd | Lost in second round |
| 2008–09 | 44 | 23 | 15 | 4 | 1 | 0 | 52 | 37 | 41 | 5th | |
| 2009–2010 | 46 | 31 | 9 | 4 | 0 | 0 | 66 | 216 | 138 | 2nd | |
| 2010–11 | 45 | 32 | 9 | 4 | 0 | 0 | 67 | 174 | 110 | 1st | |
| 2011–12 | 46 | 32 | 10 | 2 | 0 | 0 | 66 | 198 | 100 | 1st | |
| 2012–13 | 45 | 34 | 7 | 3 | 0 | 0 | 71 | 200 | 85 | 1st | |
| 2013–14 | 44 | 28 | 12 | 4 | 0 | 0 | 60 | 147 | 97 | 3rd | Won league championship, regionals, and Telus Cup |
| 2014–2015 | 44 | 24 | 20 | 0 | 0 | 0 | 48 | 159 | 134 | 6th | |
| 2015–2016 | 44 | 23 | 21 | 0 | 0 | 0 | 46 | 141 | 156 | 6th | |
| 2016–17 | 44 | 28 | 16 | 0 | 0 | 0 | 56 | 174 | 114 | 4th | |
| 2017–18 | 44 | 32 | 9 | 0 | 2 | 1 | 67 | 152 | 105 | 3rd | |

=== Regionals ===
Legend: T = Tie

| Season | Games | Won | Lost | T | Goals For | Goals Against | Standing |
|---|---|---|---|---|---|---|---|
| 2005–06 | 4 | 3 | 0 | 1 | 16 | 7 | - |
| 2006–07 | 4 | 4 | 0 | 0 | 12 | 6 | - |

=== Ice Mania results ===
Legend: T = Tie

| Year | Pool | Games | Won | Lost | T | Goals For | Goals Against | Points | Standing |
|---|---|---|---|---|---|---|---|---|---|
| 2001 | B | 4 | 3 | 1 | 0 | 21 | 10 | 6 | 1st |
| 2002 | A | 4 | 3 | 0 | 1 | 26 | 15 | 7 | Tied 1st |
| 2003 | A | 4 | 3 | 0 | 1 | 22 | 5 | 7 | 1st |
| 2004 | A | 4 | 3 | 0 | 1 | 28 | 7 | 7 | 1st |
| 2006 | D | 3 | 2 | 1 | 0 | 19 | 2 | 6 | 1st |
