= Sacred Heart College of Lucena City =

Roman Catholic college in Lucena, Philippines

Sacred Heart College of Lucena City Inc.
- Former names: Escuela del Sagrado Corazon de Jesus; Academia del Sagrado Corazon de Jesus; Colegio del Sagrado Corazon de Jesus; Sacred Heart College
- Motto: Sursum Corda
- Motto in English: Lift up your hearts
- Type: Private Roman Catholic non-profit coeducational basic and higher education institution
- Established: April 27, 1884
- Founder: Hermana Fausta Labrador
- Religious affiliation: Roman Catholic (Daughters of Charity)
- Academic affiliations: PAASCU
- Location: 1 Merchan Street, Lucena City, Quezon, Philippines; 13.94°N 121.615°E
- Alma Mater Song: "Sacred Heart College Hymn"
- Colors: Red and White
- Nicknames: Cordians and Vincentians
- Website: www.shc.edu.ph
- Location in Luzon Location in the Philippines

Sacred Heart College of Lucena City Inc. is an educational institution in Lucena, Quezon, Philippines. The first Catholic learning institution in Quezon Province, it was founded on April 27, 1884. It had its roots in the vision of a simple and saintly woman named Hermana Fausta whose exemplary life was molded on the Vincentian spirituality. The school grew and its status was changed from Academy to College in 1941. It was formally turned-over to the Daughters of Charity of Saint Vincent de Paul on 1 August 1937. The school's basic education division offers primary and secondary education from Kindergarten to Grade 12 (K-12). The higher education division offers courses leading to associate degrees, bachelor's degrees, and master's degrees.

== History ==
Sacred Heart College, the oldest Catholic institution for men and women in Quezon Province, was founded on April 27, 1884. The school had its roots in the vision of a simple and saintly woman named Fausta Labrador y Zarsadias who, at the age of 26, opened a Charity school to form the youth according to the ideals of the Catholic faith.

The mission of Hermana Uta, as she was fondly called, obtained its first shapes through Don Gregorio Merchan, a wealthy citizen of Lucena, who offered his house to serve as the first school building on April 27, 1884. Having been trained and molded by the Daughters of Charity at the Colegio de Santa Rosa, Hermana Uta later decided to leave her school in the hands of the Daughters of Charity in the twilight of her life. The school was handed over to the Sisters on August 14, 1937.

In 1939, the school was operating the complete primary, intermediate, and high school courses.

Realizing the need for the good teachers founded on solid Christian ideals, the sisters deemed it necessary to open a teacher-training course. So in 1941, the school offered the Junior Normal Courses (E.T.C.). With the opening of the new course, the status of the school was changed from Academy to College. The outbreak of the war in December 1941 forced the temporary closure of the school. The school reopened in July 1942 during the Japanese occupation.

The school’s foundress died on September 14, 1942, at the age of 84. Following her death, the institution continued to operate under the principles and educational mission she had established. On June 11, 1944, the school’s original building was destroyed by a fire. Despite the loss, the school continued its operations from several temporary locations, including the residences of Don Gregorio Merchan, Don Agaton Rodriguez, and Atty. Fabian Millar, as well as the Club X building, before relocating to its present campus.

With the construction of the present school building, the former site of the school razed down by the big fire that hit Lucena in 1965 was transformed into a landmark. The Hermana Fausta Development Center has become the center of the school's community outreach projects for the depressed sectors of the community.

In 1975, Sr. Paz Marfori, DC, the then Dean of the College, conducted a feasibility study and applied for the opening of a College of Nursing. The approval was granted, and the department was opened in June 1976.

In 1982, the Basic Education Department took a step towards academic excellence by undergoing and passing the requirements for accreditation of the Philippine Accrediting Association of Schools, Colleges and Universities (PAASCU). The BED have the benefit of an accredited status for more than thirty years.

In 1993, the Higher Education Department likewise made its own bid for PAASCU accreditation, passing the Preliminary Survey and the Formal Survey in February 1998. Since then, a succession of PAASCU visits ensued.

In the area of physical development, the school in the last two decades has constructed and/or developed other landmarks such as the school gymnasium 1984, the Sto. Nino Building and the St. Vincent Hall in 1993, the John Paul II Youth Formation House along with the Twin Hearts Ecology Park in 1994, a three-story building for the Basic Education Department in 1997 and the SHC Cultural Center and Gymnasium in 1999.

To expand its higher education offerings, the school introduced programs including AB Communication, BS Psychology, and BS Computer Science. Graduate programs were subsequently established, including a Master of Arts in Education in 1996 and a Master of Science in Nursing in 2000. The Higher Education Department later added BS Pharmacy and BS Management Accounting to its program offerings.

== The 2019 Fire Incident ==
On January 1, 2019, The main building, which houses a computer laboratory, the school chapel, offices, a library and the residential area for the sisters was razed by fire. The nearby building which is occupied by the Basic Education Department also sustained a considerable damage. The fire started around 8:30 a.m. and quickly spread to adjacent buildings, driven by strong winds, according to local authorities Firefighters from Lucena City and nearby towns responded to the blaze, but the fire continued burning for several hours before being brought under control. No casualties were reported, though the property damage was extensive.

On July 29, 2022, new and renovated buildings were blessed and turned over to the school upon its completion. Sr. Maria Ana Rosario Evidente, DC, the Visitatrix, and Sr. Ma. Teresa Fatima L. Mueda, DC, former General Councilor, led the ribbon-cutting for the new buildings. These include St. Louise de Marillac (SLM), St. Catherine Labouré (SCL), St. Vincent de Paul (SVP), and the powerhouse. Immediately after the ribbon-cutting ceremonies were the formal turnover rites at the Hermana Fausta Lounge in the SLM building. The historic event was witnessed by more than 500 guests, including stakeholders, donors, dignitaries, and public officials.

== Publication ==
"The Pulse" is the formal publication name of the Elementary level; "The Heartbeat" for the High School level of the Basic Education Department, and "The Heart" for the Higher Education Department.

== Academics ==
Sacred Heart College of Lucena City offers a comprehensive educational program that includes integrated basic education and various degree and graduate programs. The integrated basic education curriculum comprises kindergarten, primary education (Grades 1-6), junior high school (Grades 7-10), and senior high school (Grades 11-12), with an academic track that includes specializations in Science, Technology, Engineering and Mathematics (STEM), Accountancy, Business and Management (ABM), and Humanities and Social Sciences (HUMSS).

At the undergraduate level, the college offers a diverse range of degree programs, including Bachelor of Arts in Communication (ABComm), Bachelor of Science in Management Accounting (BSMA), Bachelor of Science in Accountancy (BSA), Bachelor of Science in Psychology (BSP), Bachelor of Science in Computer Science (BSCS), Bachelor of Science in Nursing (BSN), Bachelor of Science in Pharmacy (BSPh), Bachelor of Science in Social Work (BSSW), and Bachelor of Science in Business Administration (BSBA), with majors available in Financial Management (FM), Marketing Management (MM), Business Economics (BE), and Human Resource Development Management (HRDM). Additionally, the college offers Bachelor of Elementary Education (BEEd) and Bachelor of Secondary Education (BSEd) programs, with majors in English, Science, Mathematics, Filipino, and Social Studies.

For graduate studies, Sacred Heart College provides a Master of Science in Nursing (MSN) and a Master of Arts in Education (MAEd), with majors in Educational Management, English, Filipino, Mathematics, Religious Education, Biological Science, Physical Science, and Social Science.

== Alumni ==
- Heidi Mendoza, Bachelor of Science in Accountancy, Commissioner at the Commission on Audit and Under-Secretary-General at United Nations Office of Internal Oversight Services
- Edna Estifania A. Co, Bachelor of Arts in Literature (magna cum laude), Assistant Professor at NCPAG at University of the Philippines Diliman.
