= 2012 Telus Cup =

Tournament details
- Venue: Leduc Recreation Centre in Leduc, AB
- Dates: April 23–29, 2012
- Teams: 6

Final positions
- Champions: Red Deer Optimist Rebels
- Runners-up: Phénix du Collège Esther-Blondin
- Third place: Saskatoon Contacts

Tournament statistics
- Scoring leader: Laurent Dauphin (11G 7A 18P)

Awards
- MVP: Laurent Dauphin

The 2012 Telus Cup was Canada's 34th annual national midget 'AAA' hockey championship played April 23–29, 2012 at Leduc, Alberta. The Red Deer Optimist Rebels completed an improbable comeback in the gold medal game, scoring four unanswered goals in the third period en route to 6-5 double overtime win over the Phénix du Collège Esther-Blondin. It was Red Deer's first gold medal after three previous silver medal finishes.

== Teams ==
Result	Team	Region	City
1st place, gold medalist(s)	Red Deer Optimist Rebels	Pacific	Red Deer, AB
2nd place, silver medalist(s)	Phénix du Collège Esther-Blondin	Québec	Saint-Jacques, QC
3rd place, bronze medalist(s)	Saskatoon Contacts	West	Saskatoon, SK
4	Leduc Oil Kings	Host	Leduc, AB
5	Moncton Flyers	Atlantic	Moncton, NB
6	Sudbury Nickel Capital Wolves	Central	Sudbury, ON

== Round robin ==
=== Standings ===
Pos	Team	Pld	W	L	D	GF	GA	GD	Pts
1	Phénix du Collège Esther-Blondin	5	4	0	1	28	15	+13	9
2	Red Deer Optimist Rebels	5	3	0	2	19	10	+9	8
3	Saskatoon Contacts	5	2	1	2	24	18	+6	6
4	Leduc Oil Kings	5	2	3	0	22	22	0	4
5	Moncton Flyers	5	1	3	1	17	22	−5	3
6	Sudbury Nickel Capital Wolves	5	0	5	0	11	34	−23	0

=== Scores ===
Monday, April 23

- Saskatoon 2 - Red Deer 2
- Collège Esther-Blondin 6 - Sudbury 2
- Leduc 5 - Moncton 4

Tuesday, April 24

- Collège Esther-Blondin 6 - Saskatoon 2
- Red Deer 2 - Moncton 1
- Leduc 6 - Sudbury 3

Wednesday, April 25

- Collège Esther-Blondin 9 - Moncton 5
- Saskatoon 9 - Sudbury 1
- Red Deer 3 - Leduc 2

Thursday, April 26

- Moncton 3 - Sudbury 2
- Collège Esther-Blondin 2 - Red Deer 2
- Saskatoon 7 - Leduc 5

Friday, April 27

- Red Deer 10 - Sudbury 3
- Moncton 4 - Saskatoon 4
- Collège Esther-Blondin 5 - Leduc 4

== Playoffs ==
=== Semi-finals ===
Saturday, April 28

- Red Deer 2 - Saskatoon 0
- Collège Esther-Blondin 8 - Leduc 2

=== Bronze medal game ===
Sunday, April 29

- Saskatoon 3 - Leduc 2

=== Gold medal game ===
Sunday, April 29, 2012

- Red Deer 6 - Collège Esther-Blondin 5 (2OT)

== Individual awards ==
- Most Valuable Player: Laurent Dauphin (Collège Esther-Blondin)
- Top Scorer: Laurent Dauphin (Collège Esther-Blondin)
- Top Forward: Daniel Audette (Collège Esther-Blondin)
- Top Defenceman: Joel Topping (Red Deer)
- Top Goaltender: Dasan Sydora (Red Deer)
- Most Sportsmanlike Player: Kord Pankewicz (Leduc)
- Esso Scholarship: Bryn MacNab (Saskatoon)

== Road to the Telus Cup ==
=== Atlantic Region ===
Tournament held March 29-April 1, 2012 at Jack Byrne Arena in Torbay, Newfoundland and Labrador

Round Robin
Pos	Qualification	Team	Pld	W	L	D	GF	GA	GD	Pts
1	NBPEIMMHL	Moncton Flyers	4	4	0	0	17	5	+12	8
2	NLMMHL	St. John's Pennecon Privateers	4	3	1	0	15	13	+2	6
3	NSMMHL	Halifax Titans	4	1	2	1	11	11	0	3
4	Host	St. John's Maple Leafs	4	1	2	1	14	19	−5	3
5	NBPEIMMHL	Cornwall Thunder	4	0	4	0	9	18	−9	0

Championship Game
Moncton 5 - St. John's 1
Moncton advances to Telus Cup

=== Quebec ===
Ligue de Hockey Midget AAA du Quebec Championship held March 23 - April 14, 2012 at Multi Glace De Lachenaie and PEPS in Quebec

Best-of-7 series
Pos	Qualification	Team	Pld	W	L	GF	GA	GD
1	LHMAAAQ	Phénix du Collège Esther-Blondin	5	4	1	21	13	+8
2	LHMAAAQ	Le Blizzard du Séminaire Saint-François	5	1	4	13	21	−8

Collège Esther-Blondin wins the series 4-1 and advances to Telus Cup

=== Central Region ===
Tournament held April 2 – 8, 2012 at the Essar Centre in Sault Ste. Marie, Ontario

Round Robin
Pos	Qualification	Team	Pld	W	L	D	GF	GA	GD	Pts
1	GNML	Sudbury Nickel Capital Wolves	5	4	1	0	22	20	+2	8
2	Alliance	London Jr. Knights	5	4	1	0	22	13	+9	8
3	GTHL	Mississuauga Rebels	5	3	2	0	18	13	+5	6
4	OMHA	Whitby Wildcats	5	2	2	1	25	20	+5	5
5	Host	Sault Ste. Marie North Stars	5	1	3	1	15	18	−3	3
6	OEMHL	Ottawa Jr. 67's	5	0	5	0	13	31	−18	0

Semi-finals
London 3 - Mississauga 2
Sudbury 5 - Whitby 2

Championship Game
Sudbury 4 - London 3
Sudbury advances to Telus Cup

=== West Region ===
Tournament held March 29 - April 1, 2012 at the Virden Arena in Virden, Manitoba

Round Robin
Pos	Qualification	Team	Pld	W	L	D	GF	GA	GD	Pts
1	SMAAAHL	Saskatoon Contacts	3	2	0	1	11	4	+7	5
2	Host	Southwest Cougars	3	2	1	0	8	6	+2	4
3	MMAAAHL	Winnipeg Wild	3	1	1	1	10	6	+4	3
4	HNO	Kenora Thistles	3	0	3	0	0	13	−13	0

Championship Game
Saskatoon 5 - Southwest 1
Saskatoon advances to Telus Cup

=== Pacific Region ===
Playoff held April 6–8, 2012 at Red Deer Arena in Red Deer, Alberta.

Best-of-3 series
Pos	Qualification	Team	Pld	W	L	GF	GA	GD
1	AMHL	Red Deer Optimist Rebels	2	2	0	5	3	+2
2	BCMML	Vancouver Northwest Giants	2	0	2	3	5	−2

Red Deer wins series 2-0 and advances to Telus Cup

== See also ==
- Telus Cup
