= Alberta Elite Hockey League =

Canadian ice hockey league

- Sport: Ice hockey
- Founded: 1984
- No. of teams: 17
- Country: Canada
- Most recent champion: Edmonton Jr. Oilers Blue (2025-2026)
- Most titles: Red Deer Rebels/Chiefs
- Level on pyramid: U18 AAA
- Related competitions: Telus Cup
- Website: www.aehl.ca

The Alberta Elite Hockey League or AEHL (formerly the Alberta Midget Hockey League) is the provincial U18 "AAA" ice hockey league for Alberta, Canada. The league consists of 17 teams split into the North and South Divisions. League champions go on to compete with the BC Elite Hockey League champions to represent the Pacific at the annual Telus Cup, Canada's national U18 championship. The Edmonton Jr. Oilers Blue are the current league champions. Red Deer is the last AEHL team to win a national title, having won in 2012 & 2013.

== Current teams ==
=== North Division ===
- Edmonton Jr. Oilers Orange
- Edmonton Jr. Oilers Blue
- Fort Saskatchewan Strike Group Rangers
- GPAC Ernie's Sports Experts Storm (Grande Prairie)
- LJAC Wilhauk Jerky Oil Kings (Leduc)
- Lloydminster Lancers
- PAC Saints (Spruce Grove)
- St. Albert Raiders
- Sherwood Park Ennis Fabrics Kings

=== South Division ===
- Airdrie CFR Bisons
- Calgary Cannex Buffaloes
- Calgary United Pacific Projects (NW) Flames
- Calgary Northstars
- Calgary Royals
- Lethbridge Hurricanes
- Okotoks Bow Mark Oilers
- Red Deer Optimist Chiefs

== League awards ==
| Trophy | |
|---|---|
| Harry Allen Memorial Trophy | Top Scorer |
| Trevor Linden Trophy | Top Forward |
| Brian Benning Trophy | Top Defenceman |
| Brian Sutter Trophy | Top Defensive Forward |
| Bill Ranford Trophy | Top Goaltender |
| Bob Johnson Memorial Trophy | Top Sportsman |
| Glen Sather Trophy | Coach of the Year |
| Richard Warwick Memorial Trophy | |
| Esquire Watch MVP | Playoff MVP |

== League champions ==
| Year | Champion | Air Canada/Telus |
|---|---|---|
| 2026 | Edmonton Jr. Oilers Blue | Lost Pacific Championship |
| 2025 | Calgary (NW) Flames | Lost Pacific Championship |
| 2024 | Calgary Buffaloes | 3rd |
| 2023 | Calgary (NW) Flames | 6th |
| 2022 | Calgary Buffaloes | Lost Pacific Championship |
| 2021 | - | Cancelled due to COVID-19 pandemic |
| 2020 | - | Cancelled due to COVID-19 pandemic |
| 2019 | Calgary Buffaloes | 3rd |
| 2018 | Lethbridge Hurricanes | - |
| 2017 | Shwab GM Oil Kings (Leduc) | - |
| 2016 | Lloydminister Bobcats | 4th |
| 2015 | UFA Bisons | 4th |
| 2014 | Red Deer Optimist Chiefs | Lost Pacific Championship |
| 2013 | Red Deer Optimist Chiefs | Gold |
| 2012 | Red Deer Optimist Rebels | Gold |
| 2011 | Red Deer Optimist Rebels | Lost Pacific Championship |
| 2010 | Red Deer Optimist Rebels | 5th |
| 2009 | Calgary Buffaloes | Silver |
| 2008 | Calgary Buffaloes | 4th |
| 2007 | Red Deer Rebels | Silver |
| 2006 | Calgary Buffaloes | Silver |
| 2005 | Edmonton Southside Athletics | 6th |
| 2004 | Red Deer Chiefs | Bronze |
| 2003 | Calgary Northstars | Gold |
| 2002 | Red Deer Chiefs | 4th |
| 2001 | Calgary Royals | Silver |
| 2000 | Fort Saskatchewan | 4th |
| 1999 | Calgary Flames | Silver |
| 1998 | Calgary Buffaloes | Bronze |
| 1997 | Calgary Royals | Bronze |
| 1996 | Red Deer Chiefs | 4th |
| 1995 | Red Deer Chiefs | Silver |
| 1994 | Red Deer Chiefs | Silver |
| 1993 | Calgary Northstars | 4th |
| 1992 | Sherwood Park Kings | - |
| 1991 | Calgary Northstars | Gold |
| | Sherwood Park Kings | Silver |
| 1990 | St. Albert Raiders | 4th |
| 1989 | Calgary Buffaloes | Gold |
| 1988 | Calgary Northstars | Silver |
| 1987 | Calgary Buffaloes | Bronze |
| 1986 | Sherwood Park | - |
| 1985 | Calgary Buffaloes | Bronze |

=== Most championships ===
| Team | Championships |
|---|---|
| Red Deer Rebels/Chiefs | 10 |
| Calgary Buffaloes | 9 |
| Calgary Northstars | 3 |

== Telus Cup ==
The Calgary Northstars (1991 and 2003), Calgary Buffaloes (1989), and Red Deer Optimist Rebels/Chiefs (2012 & 2013), represent the only AMHL teams to have won the national midget title. The AMHL has represented the Pacific at the tournament every year since 1985, with the exceptions of 1986, 1992, 2007, and 2012, when British Columbian teams won representation. Alberta has hosted the national championship three times: 1991 in Calgary, 2007 in Red Deer, and 2012 in Leduc.

| Year | AMHL Winner | Host City |
|---|---|---|
| 2013 | Red Deer Optimist Chiefs | Sault Ste. Marie, Ontario |
| 2012 | Red Deer Optimist Rebels | Leduc |
| 2003 | Calgary Northstars | Sault Ste. Marie |
| 1991 | Calgary Northstars | Calgary |
| 1989 | Calgary Buffaloes | St. John's |

== Alumni ==
Many players move on from the AEHL to play Junior A or Major Junior in Western Canada. The league's National Hockey League (NHL) alumni include Jarome Iginla, Dany Heatley, Jason Smith, Trent Hunter, Joffery Lupul, Trevor Linden, Geoff Sanderson, Scottie Upshall, Brian Sutherby, Mike Comrie, Nick Tarnasky, Jonathan Filewich, Bryan McCabe, and Ozzy Wiesblatt.

== Other divisions ==
As of 2026, the Alberta Elite Hockey League operates both at the AAA and AA level, following the addition of AA teams and a U13 AAA pilot in the 2024-2025 season. The league houses the following divisions:

=== AAA Divisions ===
- Alberta Elite Hockey League U17 AAA
- Alberta Elite Hockey League U15 AAA
- Alberta Elite Hockey League U13 AAA

=== AA Divisions ===
- Alberta Elite Hockey League U18 AA
- Alberta Elite Hockey League U16 AA
- Alberta Elite Hockey League U15 AA
- Alberta Elite Hockey League U13 AA

== See also ==
- Hockey Alberta
- Telus Cup
- BC Elite Hockey League - U18 AAA
