= PassBlue =

Non-governmental organization

- Founded: 2011
- Type: Non-governmental organization
- Location: New York City, U.S.
- Fields: UN monitoring, human rights advocacy
- Website: www.passblue.com

PassBlue is an independent, US-based digital publication that monitors and reports on activities by the United Nations. It was founded in the fall of 2011 as a project of the Ralph Bunche Institute for International Studies at the City University of New York. PassBlue moved to the New School, a private university, and is now under the fiscal sponsorship of the Institute for Nonprofit News.

The term PassBlue is a play on the diplomatic passport known as laissez-passer ("let pass"), a blue travel document used by UN officials on missions and issued by national governments and world institutions during wartime and other periods to allow officers to travel to specific areas. PassBlue does not have an official association with the UN.

== History ==
In its 2013 description of PassBlue, the Ralph Bunche Institute for International Studies said on its website:

"The articles and essays are written by top UN journalists, who include Barbara Crossette, a former foreign correspondent for The New York Times and UN correspondent for The Nation; Irwin Arieff, who covered the UN, the White House and other assignments for Reuters; Helmut Volger, the editor of A Concise Encyclopedia of the United Nations; and Dulcie Leimbach, former editor of UNA's The InterDependent and "A Global Agenda: Issues Before the UN" and an editor/writer at The New York Times for more than two decades."

In 2015, PassBlue was financed primarily through the Carnegie Corporation of New York, with other grants from the Samuel Rubin Foundation, the Feminist Majority Foundation, the Conrad N. Hilton Foundation as well as individual donors. PassBlue has also received funding from the Open Society Foundations "To support The New School's project PassBlue expand their operational capacity to serve as a watchdog media site on the UN and related foreign affairs institutions."

PassBlue is also supported by the Wallace Fox Foundation, Pinkerton Foundation and other charitable institutions, as well as by thousands of individual donors.

PassBlue has been led since its founding by Dulcie Leimbach, who serves as editor of its articles, and Barbara Crossette. Its managing editor is John Penney. It has engaged hundreds of writers for its publications since its founding.

== Citations ==
The Arkansas Collegiate Model United Nations cites PassBlue among its curated "resources for competing in Model United Nations conferences and understanding basic issues of global governance."

The Johnson County United Nations Association in Iowa has a web page of curated resources it says provide information on "topics of interest to the UNA-USA" and recommends PassBlue as a resource for independent day-to-day updates on the work of the United Nations.

PassBlue's resources and staff are often cited by other media, such as by The New York Times in a 2021 story about the resumption of the annual in-person meeting of the UN General Assembly since the COVID-19 pandemic and another in 2018 about the US bans on diplomatic visas for foreign same-sex domestic partners.

Staff at PassBlue are also contacted for quotes by various media outlets and think tanks, such as in this article by the Carnegie Council for Ethics in International Affairs about media coverage of the UN.

In 2020, Hillary Clinton sent a link via what was then Twitter to a PassBlue article regarding the progress for women's rights since the 1995 Beijing conference for gender equality.

In 2021, Clair MacDougall was honored by the International Center for Journalists (ICFJ) for an article in PassBlue about the first death from COVID-19 of a UN PeaceKeeper.

PassBlue frequently posts updates in real time from UN meetings, such as the UN Security Council and the UN General Assembly, resulting in comments such as that of Adil Ahmad Haque, a professor at Rutgers Law School and executive editor of Just Security, during the introduction of draft text of a UN General Assembly Resolution ES-10/23 to upgrade Palestine's rights in the United Nations as an Observer State, who said "I probably won't live tweet the whole meeting, so follow @pass_blue"

== Honors ==
PassBlue and FRANCE 24 won the silver Elizabeth Neuffer Memorial Prize from the United Nations Correspondents Association (UNCA) for three investigative stories on the 2023–2024 Israel–Hamas war in the Gaza Strip they co-published over the course of 2024. FRANCE 24's Jessica Le Masurier and PassBlue's Dulcie Leimbach, Damilola Banjo and Fatma Khaled jointly won the award for their reporting.

== See also ==
- United Nations Association of the United States of America
- United Nations Foundation
- UN Office of Internal Oversight Services
- World Affairs Councils of America
- UN Watch
- NetAid
- Ralph Bunche
- The Geneva Group (United Nations)
