= Alex Brillantes Jr. =

Filipino political scientist

Alex Brillantes
- Born: Alex Bello Brillantes Jr. Philippines
- Occupations: Political Scientist and Public Administrator

Academic background
- Education: University of the Philippines Diliman (MPA, AB); University of Hawaiʻi at Mānoa (MA, PhD)

Academic work
- Institutions: University of the Philippines Diliman

Dr. Alex Bello Brillantes Jr. is a Filipino political scientist and expert of local governance and development administration. He was the dean of the University of the Philippines - National College of Public Administration and Governance (UP-NCPAG) and executive director of the Local Government Academy (LGA) under the Department of the Interior and Local Government (DILG).

== Education ==
Brillantes holds a Ph.D. and M.A. in political science from the University of Hawaiʻi at Mānoa, as well as a Master in Public Administration and a Bachelor of Arts in political science from the University of the Philippines Diliman.

== Career ==
He is a professor at the National College of Public Administration and Governance (NCPAG) at the University of the Philippines and serves as the president of the Philippine Society for Public Administration, which is affiliated with the Philippine Social Science Council.

He is also currently a member of the board of trustees of the Galing Pook Foundation and the Local Government Development Foundation.

He served as NCPAG Dean from 2004 to 2010. He was secretary-general of the Association of Schools of Public Administration of the Philippines (ASPAP), and Deputy Secretary General of the Eastern Regional Organization for Public Administration (EROPA), and founding member of the Network of Asia Pacific Schools of Public Administration and Governance (NAPSIPAG). Brillantes served as executive director of the Local Government Academy (LGA) of the Department of Interior and Local Government (DILG), and director of the Center of Local and Regional Governance (CLRG) of the UP-NCPAG.

Brillantes was the chairman of the Philippine Social Science Council (PSSC). He was visiting professor at Kobe University, in Kobe, Japan; visiting fellow at Queensland University of Technology in Brisbane, Australia and guest professor at Meiji University in Tokyo, Japan. He has written three books, and published papers on local government, development administration and civil society in local and international journals, including Asian Survey, Administrative Science Quarterly, Kasarinlan, the Philippine Journal of Public Administration.
