= UP National College of Public Administration and Governance =

Public policy school of the University of the Philippines Diliman

University of the Philippines National College of Public Administration and Governance
- Pambansang Kolehiyo ng Administrasyong Pangmadla at Pamamahala
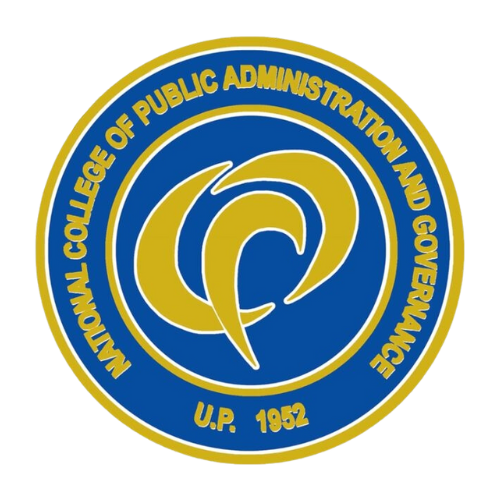
- Other name: UP NCPAG
- Type: National public administration school
- Established: 15 June 1952; 74 years ago
- Parent institution: University of the Philippines - Diliman
- Dean: Kristoffer B. Berse
- Location: R.P. de Guzman Street, UP Diliman, Quezon City, Metro Manila, 1101, Philippines; 14°39′23″N 121°03′38″E
- Colors
- Website: ncpag.upd.edu.ph

The University of the Philippines National College of Public Administration & Governance (UP NCPAG; Filipino: Pambansang Kolehiyo ng Administrasyong Pangmadla at Pamamahala) is a public administration and public policy research & educational unit under the University of the Philippines Diliman. It was established on June 15, 1952 as the Institute of Public Administration, the first of its kind in Southeast Asia. The college offers undergraduate and graduate-level diploma and degree programs, alongside various executive and certificate courses offered by its research centers.

The mission of the college is to be ‘the Center of Excellence in Public Administration education, research and extension in the region and the world that provides multi-disciplinary knowledge and learning, develops leaders and change agents, and promotes good governance reforms and practice towards a just, humane and peaceful world.’

== History ==
UP-NCPAG traces its roots to the Institute of Public Administration (IPA), which was established on June 15, 1952, after the University of the Philippines entered into an agreement with the University of Michigan in the United States to aid the former in providing technical assistance in the field of public administration as part of the Bell Mission's recommendations. For its first four (initially two) years, the IPA was under American leadership.

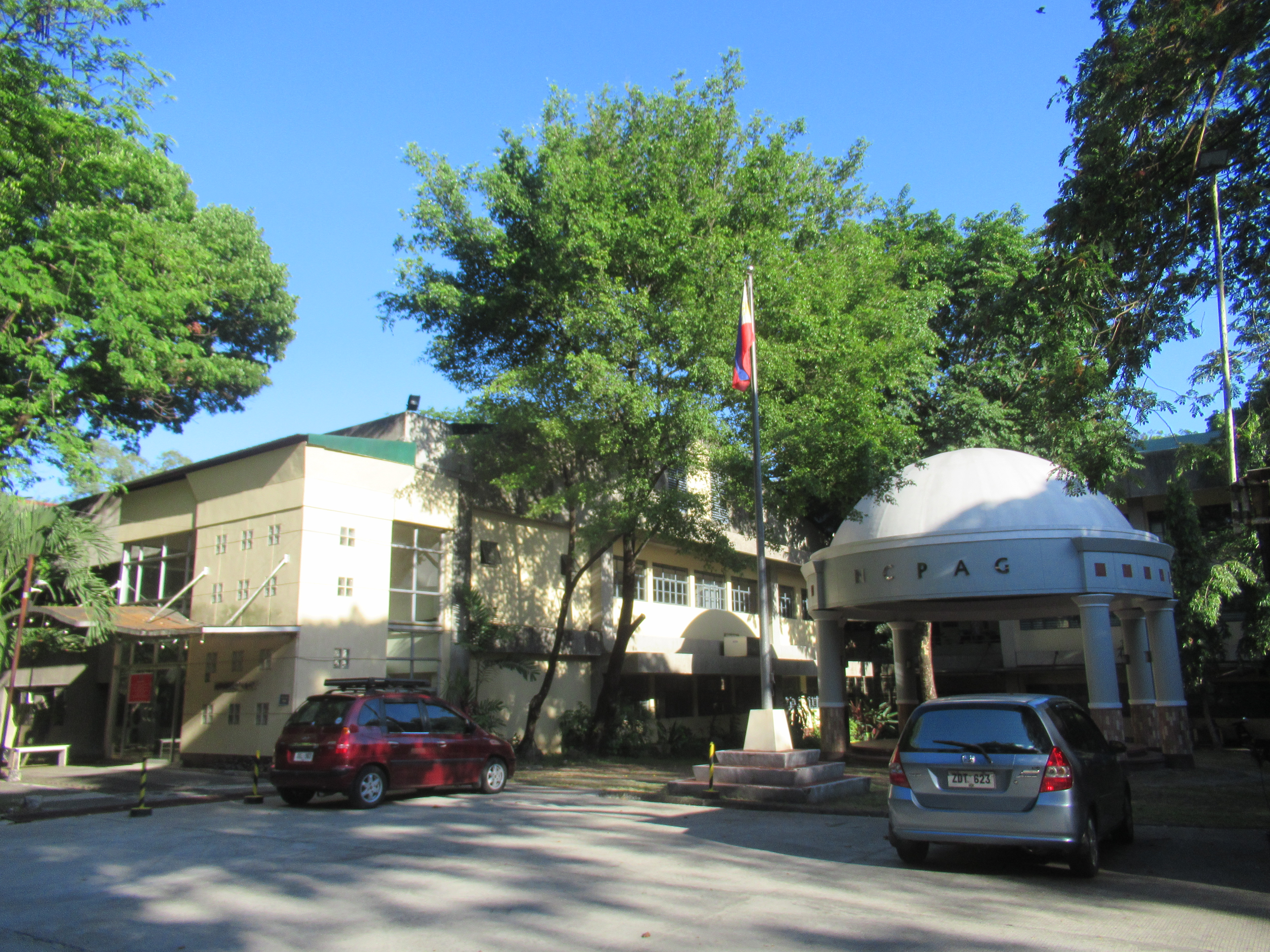
The NCPAG Dome and Assembly Hall

IPA was the first of its kind in Asia. In its first two years of operations, the IPA had conducted three kinds of courses with the participation of 2,500 government officials and employees. Later, undergraduate and master's degrees in Public Administration were offered. From 68 students in First Semester 1953–1954, enrollment in these academic programs increased to about 200 every semester by 1955.

In 1968, the Doctor of Public Administration program (DPA) was instituted, which was followed by the opening of a diploma program the following year, enabling administrators to pursue specialized courses in public administration without going through the master's degree. However, the introduction of the DPA program came with the discontinuation of the Bachelor of Arts in Public Administration (BAPA) program due to the prevailing thought at the time prioritizing those that already having some level of professional work experience. Only in 1988 would the undergraduate program be reinstated, later transforming into the Bachelor of Public Administration (BPA) program.

It was initially housed in the Rizal Hall of UP's Padre Faura campus, despite being UP Diliman unit, although it did have some classes split between Manila and Quezon City, alongside having its Manila-based students vote for UP Diliman University Student Council officers. In 1992, to mark its 40th anniversary, the college officially transferred from UP Manila to its own college building within UP Diliman.

The college changed its name four times. From the IPA, it became the Graduate School of Public Administration (GSPA), the School of Public Administration (SPA), and the College of Public Administration (CPA). The current name, the National College of Public Administration and Governance, was approved by the University of the Philippines Board of Regents in its 1126th meeting on November 26, 1998.

In 2004, the Commission on Higher Education of the Philippines officially recognized UP-NCPAG as the most outstanding school of public administration in the country.

Two academic units of the university, the School of Urban and Regional Planning and the Center for Integrative and Development Studies, trace their roots to UP-NCPAG.

== Degree programs ==
- Bachelor of Public Administration (BPA)
- Diploma in Public Management (DipPM)
- Master of Public Administration (MPA)
- Doctor of Public Administration (DPA)

== Centers and offices ==
=== Center for Public Administration and Governance Education ===
The Center for Public Administration and Governance Education (CPAGE) is in-charge of the academic programs offered by the college: the Bachelor of Public Administration (BPA), the Master of Public Administration (MPA) and the Doctor of Public Administration (DPA) programs. Its director also serves as the College Secretary and Director of Studies.

=== NCPAG Library ===
The NCPAG Library provides bibliographic and information support to the curricular, research and extension programs of the college. It serves primarily the needs of its students, faculty and research staff. Its book collection consists of over 38,000 volumes in the field of public administration and related subject fields. The Library also serves as a supplementary source of materials in the social sciences to students, faculty and researchers of other UP units. It also accommodates government and private researchers, as well as graduate students from other schools, under certain conditions.

=== Publications Office ===
Manages the publication of the Philippine Journal of Public Administration (PJPA), one of the longest running academic journals in the country. The Office also publishes books, occasional papers, monographs, and other teaching and training materials.

== Student Organizations ==
=== UP NCPAG Student Council ===
University of the Philippines - National College of Public Administration and Governance Student Council
- Abbreviation: UP NCPAG SC
- Type: Student Union
- Headquarters: NCPAG SC Office, Ground Floor, R.P. De Guzman St., UP Diliman, Quezon City, Philippines
- Chairperson: Mark Lemor Ong
- Website: https://sites.google.com/up.edu.ph/ncpagsc

The UP National College of Public Administration and Governance Student Council (UP NCPAG SC) is the official student governing body in NCPAG - University of the Philippines Diliman.

Originally patterned after the executive and legislative branches of the national government of the Philippines, all positions are elected by the entire student body every May, alongside elections for the UP Diliman University Student Council (USC), to lead for the following academic calendar year.

The Council is made up of the following:

- Chairperson;
- Vice Chairperson (who also serves as Convenor of the League of NCPAG Organizations, an umbrella of all active NCPAG student organizations);
- NCPAG Representative to the USC;
- NCPAG Representative to the University Freshie Council (UFC);
- Five Administrators comprising the 4 standing committees of the Council (Finance, External Affairs, Internal Affairs, Ways and Means, and Socio-Academic Affairs);
- Four Councilors tasked to formulate and approve official policies and position of the Student Government, as well as forming special committees for projects, of which they will head; and
- Five representatives from the Freshman, Sophomores, Junior, Senior and Graduate batch assemblies

The officers are also assisted by the Student Council Auxiliary Corps (SCAC), composed of NCPAG student volunteers who will provide assistance to the SC in the implementation of its programs.

=== Sandigang Mag-aaral para sa Pambansang Demokrasya - NCPAG (SANDIGAN-NCPAG) ===
The Sandigang Mag-aaral para sa Pambansang Demokrasya - NCPAG (SANDIGAN-NCPAG), formerly known as the Student Alliance for the Advancement of Democratic Rights in UP - NCPAG (STAND UP NCPAG), is a militant student organization in the University of the Philippines - National College of Public Administration and Governance (UP NCPAG).

STAND UP NCPAG was formed in 2020 out of the rise of militant undergraduates in NCPAG. The organization aims to break the status quo in terms of governance by forwarding genuine public service that caters to a mass-oriented purpose. It is mostly known for its principle that education is a right and that there is a need to be integrated with other sectors of society, as the alliance recognizes that education and other national issues are greatly interlinked with one another.

In the latter half of 2025, the organization underwent a constitutional revision and reorganization, resulting in its renaming to Sandigang Mag-aaral para sa Pambansang Demokrasya - NCPAG (SANDIGAN-NCPAG). The change reflected a recommitment to its core principles.

== Notable alumni ==
- Kim Robert de Leon, incumbent Secretary of the Department of Budget and Management and former Undersecretary for Administration and Finance of the Department of Transportation
- Marilyn Barua-Yap, incumbent Chairperson of the Civil Service Commission and former Secretary-General of the House of Representatives of the Philippines
- Francis Zamora incumbent Mayor of city of San Juan, Metro Manila
- Casimiro Ynares III incumbent Mayor of city of Antipolo
- Dulce Ann Hofer incumbent Governor of Zamboanga Sibugay
- Krisel Lagman incumbent Representative of Albay's 1st congressional district and former mayor of Tabaco, Albay (2007-2013; 2016-2025)
- Heidi Mendoza, Undersecretary General for the United Nations Office of Internal Oversight Services, former Commissioner of the Commission on Audit of the Philippines
- Antonio "Sonny" Trillanes IV, former Philippine Senator (2007-2019)
- Ramon Paje, former Secretary of Environment and Natural Resources (2010-2016)
- Benjamin Diokno, incumbent Monetary Board Member of Bangko Sentral ng Pilipinas (2024-present), former Secretary of Finance, 5th Governor of the Bangko Sentral ng Pilipinas (2019-2022), former Secretary of Budget and Management (1998-2001, 2016–2019)
- Mike Defensor, former Anakalusugan Partylist Representative in the House of Representatives of the Philippines (2019-2022)
- Herbert Bautista, former mayor of Quezon City (2010-2019)
- Leonor Briones, former Secretary of Education (2016-2022)
- Jejomar "Junjun" Binay Jr., former mayor of Makati (2010-2015)
- J. Prospero de Vera III, former Chairperson of the Commission on Higher Education (CHED)
- Alfred Vargas, former Representative of the 5th District of Quezon City in the House of Representatives of the Philippines (2013-2022) and former City Councilor of the 2nd District of Quezon City (2013-2022)
- Francisco Nemenzo Jr., political scientist and 18th President of the University of the Philippines
- Alex Brillantes Jr. Deputy Secretary General of the Eastern Regional Organization for Public Administration, secretary-general of the Association of Schools of Public Administration of the Philippines (ASPAP), and former dean University of the Philippines - National College of Public Administration and Governance (UP-NCPAG) (2004-2010)
