= Dileep Nair =

Singaporean diplomat

Under-Secretary-General for OIOS
- In office 24 April 2000 – 23 April 2005
- Preceded by: Karl Theodor Paschke
- Succeeded by: Inga-Britt Ahlenius

Dileep Nair is a Singaporean diplomat and bureaucrat, who was the United Nations Under-Secretary-General for Internal Oversight Services and head of the United Nations Office of Internal Oversight Services. In that capacity, he oversaw investigations of wrongdoings related to the United Nations in a range of countries including within the headquarters. The Oil-for-food scandal was initially investigated by Dileep Nair's office before turning it over to the investigating body headed by former United States Federal Reserve Chairman, Paul Volcker.

== Education ==
Nair completed a bachelor's degree in mechanical engineering from McGill University in Montreal in 1973. From 1974, he worked in Singapore's Housing and Development Board. And in 1979, he joined the Administrative Service, working in the Ministry of Finance. During his time in the finance ministry, he earned a master's degree in public administration from Harvard Kennedy School at Harvard University in the United States.

== Career ==
In 1986, Nair rose to the post of Deputy Secretary at the Ministry of Trade and Industry where he was involved in the Uruguay Round of General Agreement on Tariffs and Trade (GATT) negotiations, as well as with the Association of Southeast Asian Nations (ASEAN). From 1989 to 1997, Nair was Singapore's Deputy Secretary at the Ministry of Defence. In 1997, he left the civil service to become the CEO of the Post Office Savings Bank of Singapore; the bank was acquired in 1998 by the Development Bank of Singapore and Nair stayed on as DBS's Managing Director.

Nair was appointed to a five-year term as United Nations Under-Secretary-General for Internal Oversight Services on 24 April 2000, succeeding Karl Paschke in that position. In 2000, he wanted to determine vulnerability of the United Nations' Oil-for-Food Programme for Iraq. Benon Sevan, the head of the programme, along with UN Deputy Secretary-General Louise Frechette, rejected any such investigation, claiming that it would be too expensive to be worthwhile.

He was appointed the Singapore Consul General in the emirate of Dubai in August 2005 and served there for 6 years. In June 2011, Nair was appointed as the Singapore Ambassador to Laos and was posted in Vientiane. After completing his term in 2013, Nair was appointed as Singapore's High Commissioner to Ghana, residing in Singapore. Nair completed his term in 2017. Nair is currently an Independent Director on three public listed companies in Singapore: Keppel Data Centre REIT, Thakral Corporation, and Singapore Reinsurance. Nair is also on the board of the Agri-Food & Veterinary Authority of Singapore and the Health Sciences Authority of Singapore.

== Controversy ==
In 2004, Nair was investigated for unspecified internal accusations of graft and sexual harassment against female staff. Nair relinquished his post upon expiration of his five-year contract and returned to his native Singapore on 23 April 2005. Subsequently, in May 2006, Secretary General Kofi Annan sent a letter to Nair clearing him again of all the allegations from the staff union and expressed regret at the extended period of unnecessary and unmerited public innuendo that Nair had been subjected to.

== See also ==
- Singaporean Indians
