= Inga-Britt Ahlenius =

Swedish auditor and public servant (born 1939)

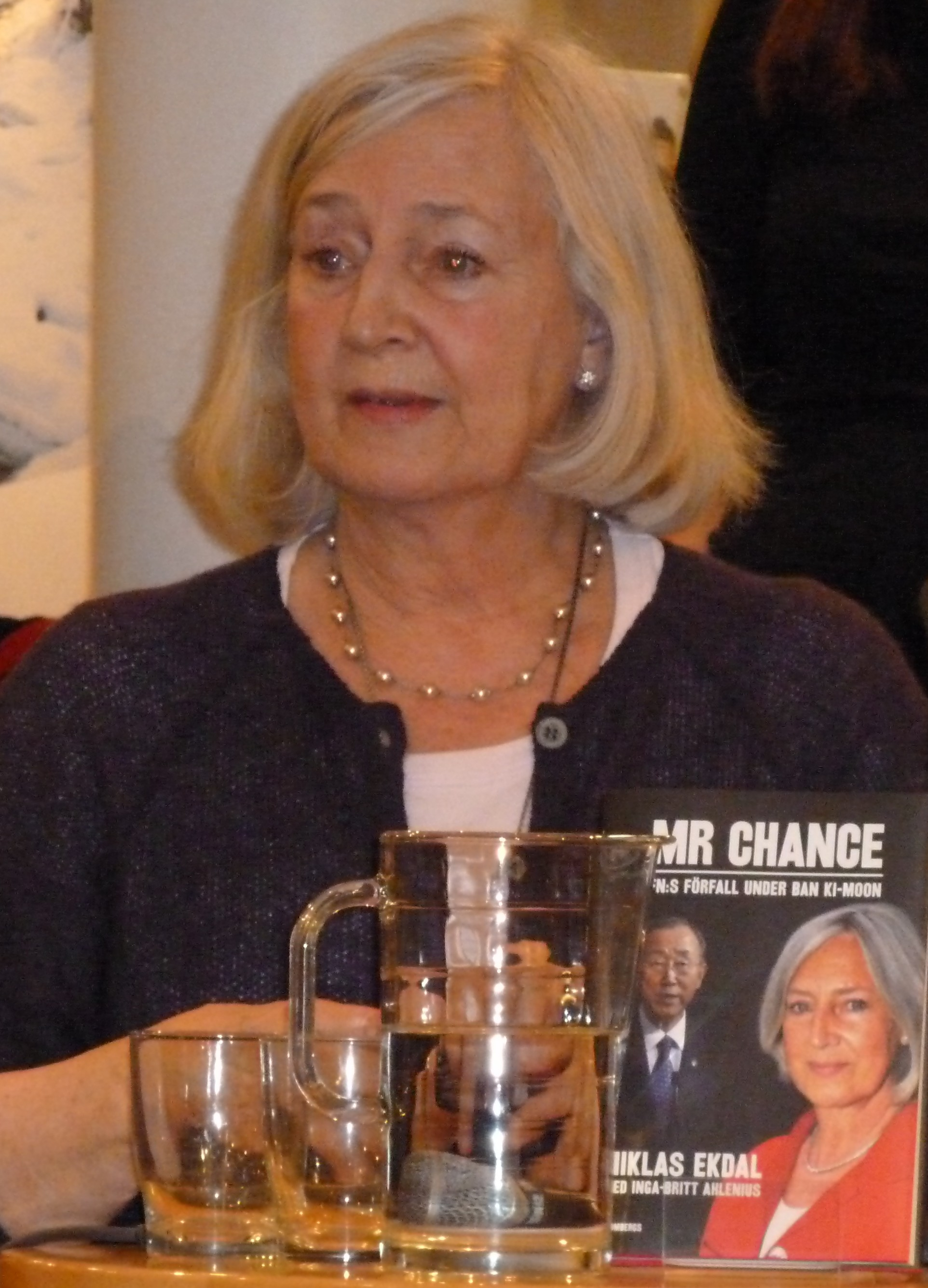
- Ahlenius in 2011

Under-Secretary-General for OIOS
- In office 15 July 2005 – 14 July 2010
- Preceded by: Dileep Nair
- Succeeded by: Carman Lapointe

Personal details
- Born: 19 April 1939 (age 86) Karlstad, Sweden
- Occupation: auditor, public servant

Inga-Britt Monica Stigsdotter Ahlenius (born 19 April 1939) is a Swedish auditor, public servant and former Under-Secretary-General for the United Nations Office of Internal Oversight Services (OIOS).

Ahlenius was born in Karlstad, Sweden. She holds a degree in business administration from the Stockholm School of Economics and started her career working in the economic secretariat of Sweden's largest commercial bank, Handelsbanken.

Between 1968 and 1993 she held various posts at the Ministry of Commerce and Industry and the Ministry of Finance in Sweden, including as head of the Budget Department from 1987. Since 1993 she has been a member of the Royal Swedish Academy of Engineering Sciences.

She served as Auditor General of the Swedish National Audit Office from 1993 to 2003.

There was some controversy when her term as Auditor General was over where she made several statements to media including that some of the government's proposed changes to the Audit Office would limit its ability to act independently. In connection with this the minister of finance claimed "she wished another assignment", which she claimed was on his initiative and that she in reality was fired. After this the parliament took the responsibility of assigning Auditor General.

Later in 2003 she served as Auditor General of Kosovo. The previous controversy from 2003 was noted by Swedish media since Mrs. Ahlenius was proposed for the position by the United States and not by her native Sweden.

During her terms as Auditor General she held several international positions. She chaired the INTOSAI Auditing Standards Committee for eight years, and was chairman of the Governing Board of the European Organization for Supreme Audit Institutions (EUROSAI) during 1993 to 1996.

Ahlenius was also a member of the Committee of Independent Experts that was called for by the European Parliament with a mandate to examine the way in which the European Commission detects and deals with fraud, mismanagement and nepotism. Their report led to the resignation of the commission.

Ahlenius was appointed Under-Secretary-General for United Nations Office of Internal Oversight Services for a five-year term starting on 15 July 2005. After this assignment, her open critique of Ban Ki-moon's leadership has been severe. Mr Chance, the title of Ekdal's and Ahlenius's book, is an ironic reference to Chance the Gardener, the character in novel and 1979 comedy-drama film Being There.

Commenting on the 2015 FIFA corruption case, Ahlenius suggested side-stepping presumption of innocence and that the accused should prove their innocence.

== Bibliography ==
- Niklas Ekdal with Inga-Britt Ahlenius: Mr Chance: – FN:s förfall under Ban Ki-moon [Mr Chance—the UN's decay under Ban Ki-moon]. Stockholm 2011. ISBN 978-91-7337-271-8.
