= Laurent Dauphin =

Canadian ice hockey player (born 1995)

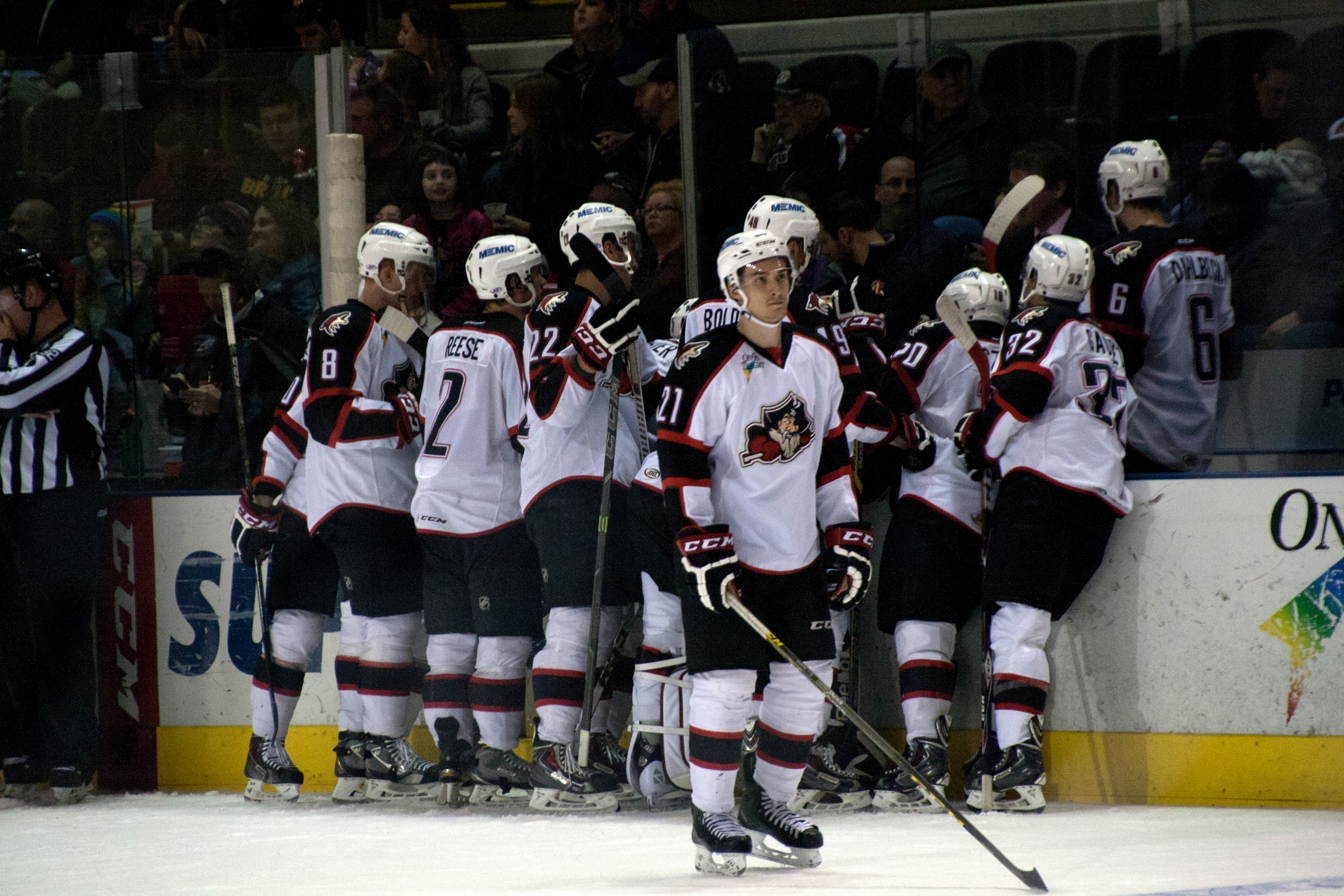
- Dauphin with the Portland Pirates in 2015
- Born: March 27, 1995 (age 31) Repentigny, Quebec, Canada
- Height: 6 ft 1 in (185 cm)
- Weight: 181 lb (82 kg; 12 st 13 lb)
- Position: Forward
- Shoots: Left
- AHL team Former teams: Laval Rocket; Arizona Coyotes; Montreal Canadiens; HC Ambrì-Piotta
- NHL draft: 39th overall, 2013; Phoenix Coyotes
- Playing career: 2015–present

Laurent Dauphin (born March 27, 1995) is a Canadian professional ice hockey forward for the Laval Rocket of the American Hockey League (AHL). He was selected in the second round, 39th overall, by the Phoenix Coyotes in the 2013 NHL entry draft. Dauphin has also previously played for the Montreal Canadiens.

== Playing career ==
=== Early years ===
As a youth, Dauphin participated in the 2007 Quebec International Pee-Wee Hockey Tournament with a minor ice hockey team from Lanaudière Ouest. He later played with the Collège Esther-Blondin Phénix of the Ligue de hockey Midget AAA du Québec (QMAAA), where he became the first player in franchise history to record 100 points and was named as MVP at the ensuing 2012 Telus Cup. Dauphin then spent three seasons of major junior with the Chicoutimi Saguenéens of the Quebec Major Junior Hockey League (QMJHL), amassing 186 total points in 170 QMJHL games.

=== Professional ===
Making his NHL debut during the course of the 2015–16 season, Dauphin scored his first career NHL goal against the Vancouver Canucks on January 4, 2016. He was reassigned to the American Hockey League (AHL) the following day.

On June 23, 2017, Dauphin was traded during the course of the 2017 NHL entry draft alongside Connor Murphy to the Chicago Blackhawks in exchange for Niklas Hjalmarsson.

After attending both training camp and pre-season with the Blackhawks, Dauphin was reassigned to AHL affiliate, the Rockford IceHogs, for the 2017–18 season. Less than one year after being traded to Chicago, he and teammate Richard Pánik were traded to the Coyotes in exchange for Anthony Duclair and Adam Clendening, effectively marking Dauphin's second tenure with the organization.

Serving as an alternate captain for his third season with the Coyotes' affiliate the Tucson Roadrunners in 2018–19, he recorded 20 points in 34 AHL games for the Roadrunners and made a lone appearance with the Coyotes on January 10, 2019 against the Vancouver Canucks, before being traded away for a second time by the organization, along with Adam Helewka, to the Nashville Predators in exchange for Emil Pettersson on February 8. Later that same month, Dauphin, while with the Predators' AHL affiliate, the Milwaukee Admirals, was signed to a one-year, two-way contract extension.

Continuing with the Admirals in the 2019–20 season, Dauphin added seven goals and 16 points in 33 games before he was traded by the Predators to the Montreal Canadiens in exchange for Michael McCarron on January 7, 2020. On June 21, 2021, Dauphin was re-signed to a one-year, two-way contract by the Canadiens.

The subsequent 2021–22 season saw Dauphin get his most substantial opportunities in the NHL since 2017, as the injury-depleted Canadiens called him up for long periods when other centremen were sidelined. On March 9, 2022, he played a career-high twenty-fifth game in an NHL season, and remarked "playing for the Canadiens has always been a dream, and along with coming back to the National League, it’s like a two-for-one in my eyes."

Dauphin returned as an unrestricted free agent for a third stint with the Arizona Coyotes, signing a one-year, two-way contract on July 13, 2022. In the following 2022–23 season, Dauphin split the season between Tucson and the Coyotes, appearing in 21 games with the latter, contributing a goal.

As an impending unrestricted free agent, Dauphin opted to sign his first contract abroad in agreeing to an optional two-year contract with Swiss-based HC Ambrì-Piotta of the National League (NL) on June 1, 2023. However, Dauphin ultimately returned to North America after just a single season overseas, signing a one-year AHL contract with the Laval Rocket on July 1, 2024, a team he previously played for between 2019 and 2022. In the midst of that season's Calder Cup playoffs, Dauphin was signed to a two-year contract extension.

== International play ==
Medal record

Representing Canada

Men's ice hockey

World U18 Championships
Gold medal – first place	2013 Russia	

Internationally, Dauphin first represented Hockey Canada as part of team Canada Quebec at the 2012 World U-17 Hockey Challenge where his team ultimately finished in sixth place. Thereafter, he was named to the Canadian national under-18 team for the 2013 IIHF World U18 Championships, capturing a gold medal.

In December 2023, Dauphin, along with the NL's HC Ambrì-Piotta, participated in the annual Spengler Cup tournament held in Davos, Switzerland. For his part, he registered three points during group stage play before his team was ousted in their quarterfinals matchup against Frölunda HC.

== Career statistics ==
=== Regular season and playoffs ===
			Regular season					Playoffs
Season	Team	League	GP	G	A	Pts	PIM	GP	G	A	Pts	PIM
2010–11	Collège Esther-Blondin Phénix	QMAAA	41	16	25	41	28	3	0	1	1	0
2011–12	Collège Esther-Blondin Phénix	QMAAA	40	17	45	62	48	13	12	14	26	12
2012–13	Chicoutimi Saguenéens	QMJHL	62	25	32	57	50	6	2	2	4	8
2013–14	Chicoutimi Saguenéens	QMJHL	52	24	30	54	56	—	—	—	—	—
2014–15	Chicoutimi Saguenéens	QMJHL	56	31	44	75	74	5	5	3	8	12
2014–15	Portland Pirates	AHL	4	1	0	1	2	5	0	2	2	0
2015–16	Springfield Falcons	AHL	66	11	13	24	72	—	—	—	—	—
2015–16	Arizona Coyotes	NHL	8	1	0	1	4	—	—	—	—	—
2016–17	Arizona Coyotes	NHL	24	2	1	3	12	—	—	—	—	—
2016–17	Tucson Roadrunners	AHL	38	17	11	28	44	—	—	—	—	—
2017–18	Rockford IceHogs	AHL	33	4	10	14	23	—	—	—	—	—
2017–18	Tucson Roadrunners	AHL	17	5	10	15	43	—	—	—	—	—
2017–18	Arizona Coyotes	NHL	2	0	0	0	2	—	—	—	—	—
2018–19	Tucson Roadrunners	AHL	34	6	14	20	42	—	—	—	—	—
2018–19	Arizona Coyotes	NHL	1	0	0	0	0	—	—	—	—	—
2018–19	Milwaukee Admirals	AHL	27	4	11	15	18	4	0	0	0	0
2019–20	Milwaukee Admirals	AHL	33	7	9	16	26	—	—	—	—	—
2019–20	Laval Rocket	AHL	25	7	8	15	16	—	—	—	—	—
2020–21	Laval Rocket	AHL	21	5	11	16	8	—	—	—	—	—
2021–22	Laval Rocket	AHL	18	11	5	16	12	—	—	—	—	—
2021–22	Montreal Canadiens	NHL	38	4	8	12	25	—	—	—	—	—
2022–23	Tucson Roadrunners	AHL	48	16	25	41	28	—	—	—	—	—
2022–23	Arizona Coyotes	NHL	21	1	0	1	10	—	—	—	—	—
2023–24	HC Ambrì-Piotta	NL	44	16	22	38	70	2	0	0	0	2
2024–25	Laval Rocket	AHL	63	26	30	56	54	11	5	4	9	6
2025–26	Laval Rocket	AHL	53	15	44	59	34	5	2	5	7	6
NHL totals			94	8	9	17	53	—	—	—	—	—

=== International ===
Year	Team	Event	Result	GP	G	A	Pts	PIM
2012	Canada Quebec	U17	6th	5	0	1	1	0
2013	Canada	U18	1st place, gold medalist(s)	7	4	2	6	6
2023	HC Ambrì-Piotta	SC	5th	3	1	2	3	2
Junior totals				12	4	3	7	6
Senior totals				3	1	2	3	2

== Awards and honours ==
Award	Year	Ref
QMAAA
Champions (Collège Esther-Blondin Phénix)	2012	
Playoffs MVP	2012	
Second All-Star Team	2012	
CHL
CHL/NHL Top Prospects Game	2013	
CHL Canada/Russia Series	2013, 2014	
