= Karl Theodor Paschke =

UN official (born 1935)

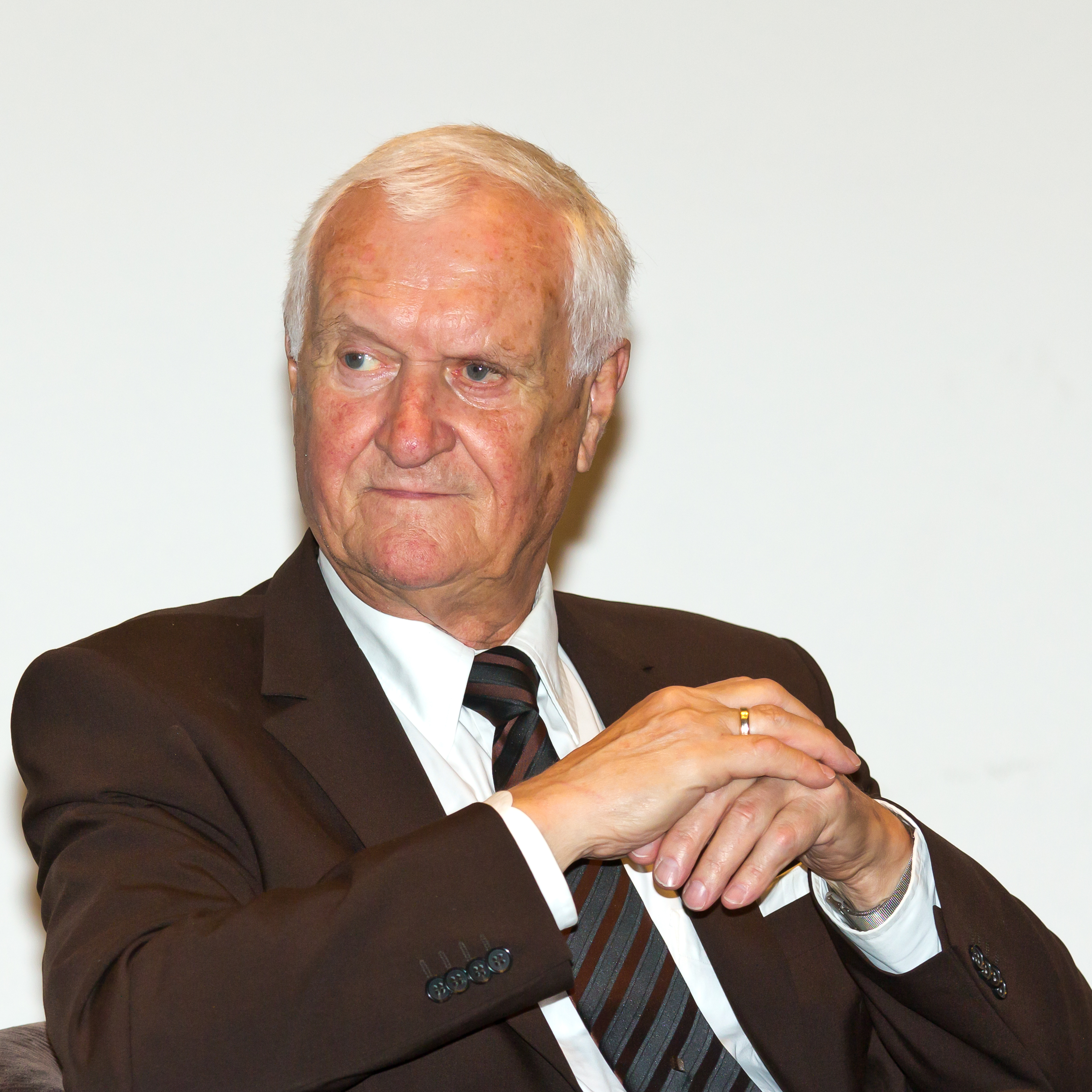
- Paschke in 2013

Under-Secretary-General for OIOS
- In office 1 January 1994 – 31 December 1999
- Succeeded by: Dileep Nair

Personal details
- Born: 1935 (age 90–91) Berlin, Germany

Karl Theodor Paschke (born 1935) is a former Under Secretary General for the United Nations. He studied jurisprudence in Bonn and Munich before working for the Foreign Office. From 1994 to 1999, he served as head of the United Nations Office of Internal Oversight Services. Among other things, he also teaches seminars on the U.N. at the Willy Brandt School of Public Policy.
