= Carman Lapointe =

Canadian diplomat

Carman L. Lapointe

Under-Secretary-General for OIOS
- In office 14 September 2010 – 13 September 2015
- Preceded by: Inga-Britt Ahlenius
- Succeeded by: Heidi Mendoza

Personal details
- Born: 1951 (age 74–75) Virden, Manitoba, Canada

Carman Lapointe (born 1951, in Canada) was Under-Secretary-General for the United Nations Office of Internal Oversight Services (OIOS) from 2010 to 2015. Lapointe retired in 2015Prior to joining the UN, Lapointe was Auditor General for the World Bank Group headquartered in Washington, DC. She has also served as an auditor for Bank of Canada and corporate auditor for Canada Post, among others. She was the first woman Chairperson of The Institute of Internal Auditors in 1995.
