= Hermana Fausta =

Filipino laywoman (1858–1942)

Hermana Fausta Labrador
- Born: 19 December 1858; Tayabas, Quezon, Philippines
- Died: 14 September 1942 (aged 83); Lucena, Quezon, Philippines

Hermana Fausta Labrador y Zarzadias (December 19, 1858 – September 14, 1942) is a Filipino laywoman. She founded the Escuela del Sagrado Corazon de Jesus, a charity school for poor children that has evolved into what is now Sacred Heart College in Lucena City.

== Early life ==
Hermana Fausta Labrador was born on December 19, 1858, in Tayabas, Quezon, to Policarpio Labrador and Nemesia Zarzadias. On December 22, 1858, she was baptized in St. Michael the Archangel Church, Tayabas. On December 2, 1866, her mother died at age 27. Her father, Policaripio Labrador had a second marriage to Maria Poblete, who raised her and her sister Vicenta as her own children along with the children born in this marriage: Fe, Felisa, Justino, and Marcelo (who all later took San Agustin as their family name) She started schooling in 1869 and in April 1878 she left her home in Tayabas and studied in Colegio de Santa Rosa de Manila.

== Religious life ==
Fray Mariano Granja visited them in the new house and counselled them to live in harmony. He gave Fausta "guidelines" regarding the house. Call all members of the new household, admonish them to live in the harmony. He imparted his paternal blessing with these words: "May the peace reign in this house." They all went to Church except the old Juan. From this day on the Rule of Life was: Hermana to get up at 3 am everyday; her companions at 4 am to pray together the Rosary and Trisagion. Afterwards companions remain to tidy the house. Hermana goes immediately to the church. Her companions follow her when the church bells ring for mass. Together they leave the church for breakfast. After which each to its respective chores while Hermana and Flaviana remain in the house. These consisted of: engage in sewing baptismal robes and burial clothes; make scapulars and artificial flowers to generate income to meet their daily needs; answer the call of the sick and help those in their last agony. May devotion in the church urging people to participate especially the young. Floral offering to the Blessed Virgin. Introduction of the Apostleship of Prayer all the town people were members.

Gobernadorcillo Don Demetrio Trinidad issued an ordinance to gather the old people of both sexes living near the shores who had not gone to Confession for a long time and sorting them: the men to the courthouse (tribunal), the women to the house of Hermana Fausta to be instructed daily to receive the Sacrament of Confession and Communion." He started and continued every year the following devotion: on Quinquagesima Sunday (Domingo de Carnaval) to Ash Wednesday we gather in recollection in preparation of the outrages inflicted to the Heart of Jesus during these three days.Gather the "dalagas" (young woman) for Catechism lesson by order of Fr. Granja. They lived in this house. Fr. Granja provided for their upkeeping, food and clothing. To help him, I go from house to house begging.

Daily Work of Hermana Fausta : Teach in a loud voice:

"Every night Hermana Tomasa, Cesarea and Escolastica come to this house followed by Fr. Granja who explains what we have taught our charges during the day. Many, although already well prepared, do not like to leave and they remain in this house."

On October 29, 1936, the Roman Catholic Church bestowed her a certificate and a medal of recognition – Pro Ecclesia et Pontifice. The award is a recognition of the Holy See, conferred for distinguished service to the Catholic Church by lay people and clergy.

== Death and Veneration ==
Hermana Fausta Labrador died on 14 September 1942, on the Feast of the Exaltation of the Cross.

Her beatification proceedings for her cause are now undertaken by the Diocese of Lucena with the full support of the Daughters of Charity and Sacred Heart College.

== City Ordinance No.2377 ==
Lucena City Declares Hermana Fausta Labrador as "Ina ng Lucena"

From the book The Good Woman of Lucena to the indie film “Fausta” to the coffee table book “Witnessing to a Glorious Heritage”, everything seem to have come into its own place and perspective, leading to another magnificent act – Lucena City Ordinance No. 2377 Series of 2009 entitled “An Ordinance Declaring Hermana Fausta Labrador y Zarzadias as One of the Local Heroes of Lucena City and shall be called “INA NG LUCENA.”

Initiated by the school through its President Sr. Fe G. Gedalanga, D.C. and with the help of its SHC alumnus and long time college professor Councilor Wilfredo Asilo, the City Ordinance No. 2377 was unanimously enacted by the 12 Councilors and Vice Mayor Philip M. Castillo on December 7 and approved by Mayor Ramon Y. Talaga, Jr. on December 14.

Before the approval of the city ordinance, a well attended public forum was held on December 4. The audience was able to know the life story of Hermana Fausta and her contributions to Lucena by watching the movie “Fausta” and by listening to the accounts of various resource speakers who have had personal encounters with Hermana Fausta, experiences as alumni or as parents of students in SHC, like Mr. Juanito T. Martinez who was the founder of SHC's Parent Faculty Council in the college department, and knowledge on the history of Lucena.

A video of Dr. Cesar A. Villariba, a known historian of Lucena City and Quezon Province, was shown wherein he mentioned that among the famous and important women of Lucena, Hermana Fausta is truly a remarkable one. In addition, Dr. Rebecca V. de Ocampo, a former superintendent of Lucena City and Marinduque and now president of Girl Scouts of the Philippines-Quezon Council, expressed her belief that Hermana Fausta could be the model that youth of today is clamoring for. Then Purificacion Jawili, or Tita Puring, shared her fond memories of Hermana Fausta while she was still a young child. “Ang diwa ni Hermana Fausta… ang pagtulong sa kapwa ay dumadaloy” said Tita Puring recalling how “banal” Lola Uta was.

With all the statements attesting to life and works of Hermana Fausta, the principal author Councilor Asilo, together with the co-authors Councilor Felix F. Avillo and Councilor Clarinda S. Cabana, went for these additional provisions: December 19, being the date of birth, be celebrated in Lucena City as “Hermana Fausta Day” with its celebration spearheaded by the Alumni of Sacred Heart College; a monument in honor of Hermana Fausta be erected in a conspicuous place in the city with the help of the City Government which shall be financed by the administration of SHC; and the National Historical Commission be notified of the declaration through the ordinance.

Inspiring and historical, she truly holds a special place in the hearts of the students, the Cordians, and all the city people. Yes, that is Hermana Fausta, “Ina ng Lucena”, the hero.
