= Isabella Dryden =

Canadian educator (1917–2024)

- Born: October 14, 1917
- Died: May 17, 2024 (aged 106); Winnipeg, Manitoba, Canada
- Known for: Longtime educator in Manitoba
- Notable work: Centenarian teaching computer classes; supervised province-wide business school curriculum

Isabella Margaret Dryden (October 14, 1917 – May 17, 2024) was a Canadian educator known for teaching computer classes at the age of 102. She also supervised the business education curriculum used in Manitoba's public school system and is credited with making business studies a degree course at Manitoba's main university.

== Background ==
Born on October 14, 1917, Dryden grew up on a farm in Manitoba, in the district of Lenore, the oldest of five children. Her parents were John and Mary Dryden. When she was 12 years old, her father died and Dryden helped her mother raise her younger siblings.

From the age of six, Dryden taught her brothers and sisters how to read and count. On her first day of school in grade one, she knew she wanted to become a teacher one day. She left home to obtain a teaching certificate from Central Normal School in Winnipeg. Dryden remained single her whole life, seeing as women teachers were not permitted to marry in the 1930s. She however had many nieces and nephews that she stayed in touch with through the internet.

Dryden died in Winnipeg on May 17, 2024, at the age of 106.

== Career ==
Dryden began her teaching career in 1937, near the rural community of Lenore, Manitoba. She taught at the Errol School, a one-room building with an outhouse and wood stove. She instructed grades one through nine and had additional tasks like preparing lunches and organizing dances. Her next teaching job was at the Bardal School in Sinclair, where she had 45 students. She taught at Bardal, also a one-room schoolhouse, from 1941 to 1942. After dealing with a personal health crisis, she left teaching to pursue a secretarial career in Windsor, Ontario, while attending business classes part-time. After five years of office work, she returned to her former career in 1947, teaching at Two Creeks School and later Virden Public School, both located in her home province.

In 1949, Dryden began giving business classes at Virden Collegiate Institute in Virden, Manitoba. She taught courses such as book keeping, typewriting, law, and economics. Among her former students was celebrity entrepreneur Jim Treliving, whose family lived in the area. During her tenure with the high school, Dryden worked on obtaining her university degree in business education. At the time, Manitoba had no graduate programs in business, so she studied during the summer sessions at institutions located in other provinces, such as the University of British Columbia and the University of Alberta.

In 1967, Dryden became an administrator for the Manitoba public school system, overseeing the business education curriculum for the Department of Education. She held this position until her retirement in 1983. While there, she also helped define the curriculums for the Industrial Arts and Vocational Industrial programs, as well as being introduced to early computer systems. She learned how to use the room sized mainframes which relied on punch cards and outputted reams of paper filled with data. During the 1970s, Dryden also taught business classes at the University of Manitoba and Red River Community College, as part of a joint Faculty of Education program. As a business educator she published many articles on the subject. Lea Mansell, from Manitoba's "Educators of Business Information Technology" (EBIT) association, credits Dryden with being "the impetus for business education to become a recognized course at Red River Community College and later a degree course in University of Manitoba."

Once Dryden retired in 1983, she continued her computer training, keeping up with the latest technological changes such as the introduction of keyboards. She became a volunteer teacher from 1984 until 1996, instructing computer skills to Grade 4 children. She taught at the Salisbury Morse Place School located in East Kildonan, Manitoba. In 1987, she also began giving computer classes to seniors, after realizing how many retirees were scared of technology. She currently teaches four times per week at the "Creative Retirement Learning Centre" and the "Chinese Cultural and Community Centre" in Winnipeg, Manitoba. Dryden offered introductory classes in computer technology and Microsoft Office software, as well as explaining how to send emails and stay safe online. She taught on numerous operating systems, from Windows 97 to Windows 10, while managing the bugs that come with new releases.

Keeping pace with technological changes, necessary for her computer classes, involved plenty of work for Dryden. However, she still enjoyed "... working with people, and watching them as the learning process goes on." In order to advance, she believed that students need to develop their minds, bodies and spirits. With regards to computers and seniors, she felt that using technology keeps the brain active and also allows retirees to keep in touch with loved ones. Dryden also saw a negative side to new technologies, considering how many people now focus on their cell phones when they could be connecting with others.

== Awards and honors ==
In 1996, the "Creative Retirement Learning Centre" awarded Dryden an honorary lifetime membership for her volunteer work. In 2000, Manitoba's "Educators of Business Information Technology" (EBIT) established a cash prize in Dryden's name which is still awarded today to business teacher graduates. In 2017, the EBIT also dedicated a special evening to Dryden, honouring her contributions to education.

Additionally in 2017, the Manitoba Teachers’ Society honoured Dryden with a special evening and profiled her in their magazine's March issue. That same year, the City of Winnipeg presented her with a Community Service Award and she also received the Sovereign's Medal for Volunteers from the Governor General of Canada, Julie Payette.
