= Virden/R.J. (Bob) Andrew Field Regional Aerodrome =

Airport in Manitoba, Canada

- IATA: none; ICAO: CYVD

Summary
- Airport type: Public
- Operator: Town of Virden
- Location: Virden, Manitoba
- Time zone: CST (UTC−06:00)
  - Summer (DST): CDT (UTC−05:00)
- Elevation AMSL: 1,465 ft / 447 m
- Coordinates: 49°52′42″N 100°54′53″W

Map
- Location in Manitoba CYVD (Canada)

Runways
Direction	Length		Surface
Direction	ft	m	Surface
08/26	6,001	1,829	Asphalt
- Sources: Canada Flight Supplement

Virden/R.J. (Bob) Andrew Field Regional Aerodrome (ICAO: CYVD) is located 1 nautical mile (1.9 km; 1.2 mi) north of Virden, Manitoba, Canada.

During World War II, Virden airport was home to No. 19 Elementary Flying Training School, part of the British Commonwealth Air Training Plan.

As of the summer of 2010, one of the original hangars was still standing.

== See also ==
- List of airports in Manitoba
- Virden (West) Airport
- Virden (Gabrielle Farm) Airport
