= RCAF Station Virden =

- Near Virden, Manitoba in Canada

Site information
- Operator: Formerly Royal Canadian Air Force

Location

Site history
- In use: 1941-4

Garrison information
- Occupants: No. 19 Elementary Flying Training School (1941-1944)

Airfield information
- Identifiers: IATA: none, ICAO: none
- Elevation: 1446' AMSL
Runways
Direction	Length and surface
All direction	3600' diameter turf

RCAF Station Virden was a Second World War, Royal Canadian Air Force (RCAF) station. It was a British Commonwealth Air Training Plan (BCATP) flying training station located north of Virden, Manitoba, Canada. It is now the site of Virden/R.J. (Bob) Andrew Field Regional Aerodrome.

In approximately 1942 the aerodrome was listed at 49°53′N 100°55′W with a Var. 14 degrees 30' E and elevation of 1446'. The runway is listed as a 3600' diameter, turf, all way field.

The station hosted No. 19 Elementary Flying Training School (19 EFTS). Flight instructors were civilian and were members of the Brandon-Virden Flying Club and the Moose Jaw Flying Club. Aircraft used include the de Havilland Tiger Moth and Fairchild Cornell. A relief (emergency) landing field was located near Lenore. No. 19 EFTS opened on May 16, 1941, and closed on December 15, 1944.
