= Tundra Oil & Gas Place =

Recreation complex in Virden, Manitoba

Coordinates: 49.8499°N 100.9272°W

- Interactive map of Tundra Oil & Gas Place
- Former names: Virden Regional Multi-purpose Recreation Facility
- Location: 900-5th Avenue; Virden, Manitoba, Canada
- Operator: Town of Virden
- Capacity: arena - 1,200

Construction
- Groundbreaking: March 2010
- Opened: June 2011
- Cost: CA$18 million ($24.7 million in 2025 dollars)

Tenants
- Virden Oil Kings (NCHL) 2011–present Virden Golden Bears (MHSHL) 2011–present Virden Oil Capitals (MJHL) 2012–present

Website
- Tundra Oil & Gas Place

Tundra Oil & Gas Place is a multi-purpose recreation complex located in the town of Virden, Manitoba, Canada. The venue includes a 1,200-seat ice hockey arena, community hall, and recreational facilities. The naming rights to the complex were acquired by Tundra Oil & Gas Partnership in August 2012.

== Construction ==
With Virden's aging recreational facilities reaching the end of their useful lives, the Town of Virden held public consultations to assess the needs of the community and region. The result of this was the idea to build a large multi-use facility that would replace older facilities and provide recreational options not available to residents in the area. Construction on the new complex began in March 2010 and was completed in June 2011. The total cost of the facility was $18 million, with the federal and provincial governments contributing $5 million in public funding.

== Arena ==
The 1,204-seat arena at Tundra Oil & Gas Place is home to the Virden Oil Capitals of the Manitoba Junior Hockey League, Virden Oil Kings of the North Central Hockey League, Virden Golden Bears of the Manitoba High School Hockey League, local minor hockey, and local figure skating programs. The first major event hosted by the arena was the 2012 Telus Cup regional championship, which was hosted by the Manitoba Midget 'AAA' Hockey League's Southwest Cougars.

== Other facilities ==
The complex also features a 500-seat community hall, retail space, fitness centre, running/walking track, and an outdoor swimming pool. These public facilities, along with the arena, are managed by the Town of Virden's Parks and Recreation department.

== Major events ==
- 2012 Telus Cup - Western regional tournament
- 2014 Manitoba Scotties Tournament of Hearts
- 2019 Viterra Championship
