= Heidi Mendoza =

Filipino public official

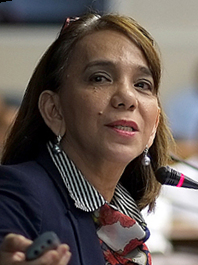
- Mendoza in 2015

Under-Secretary-General for the United Nations Office of Internal Oversight Services
- In office November 11, 2015 – October 17, 2019
- Preceded by: Carman Lapointe
- Succeeded by: Fatoumata Ndiaye

Officer in Charge of the Commission on Audit
- In office February 3, 2015 – March 25, 2015
- President: Benigno Aquino III
- Preceded by: Grace Pulido-Tan (chairperson)
- Succeeded by: Michael Aguinaldo (chairperson)

Commissioner of the Commission on Audit
- In office April 18, 2011 – November 11, 2015 Serving with: Juanito Espino Jr.; Rowena Guanzon; Jose Fabia
- President: Benigno Aquino III
- Preceded by: Evelyn San Buenaventura
- Succeeded by: Isabel Dasalla-Agito

Personal details
- Born: Heidi Reyes Lloce; November 3, 1962 (age 63) Tayabas, Quezon, Philippines
- Party: Independent
- Spouse: Meynardo dela Paz Mendoza
- Education: Sacred Heart College of Lucena City (BS); University of the Philippines Diliman (MPA); National Defense College of the Philippines (MNSA)
- Occupation: Certified Public Accountant • Auditor • Anti-corruption advocate
- Profession: Accountant
- Known for: Whistleblower in the 2011 AFP corruption scandal Former COA Commissioner; Former UN Under-Secretary-General for Internal Oversight Services
- Awards: Yahoo! 2011 Modern Day Hero; Accountancy Centenary Award of Excellence (2023); Outstanding Professional Award (2024)
- Website: Heidi Mendoza

Heidi Reyes Lloce-Mendoza (born November 3, 1962) is a Filipino auditor, Certified Public Accountant, and former civil servant known for her advocacy against corruption and for governance reforms. Mendoza previously served as one of the two commissioners of the Commission on Audit (COA) from 2011 to 2015, and was the agency's Officer in Charge (OIC) from February to March 2015. She later became the Under-Secretary-General of the United Nations Office of Internal Oversight Services (OIOS) from 2015 to 2019, becoming the first Filipino to hold that specific high-level position in the United Nations.

Mendoza gained prominence as a whistleblower in the 2011 Armed Forces of the Philippines corruption scandal, exposing irregularities in military funds. She is the author of A Guide to Investigation & Common Procurement Fraud and Irregularities and has been recognized as a Yahoo! 2011 Modern Day Hero. In 2025, she ran as an independent candidate for the Philippine Senate, securing over 8.7 million votes but placing 21st overall.

== Early life and education ==
Mendoza was born in Tayabas, Quezon to Agapito Lloce, a policeman, and Silveria Reyes. She attended Tayabas East Elementary School and graduated as class salutatorian from St. John Bosco Academy in Tayabas. Mendoza earned her Bachelor of Science in Accountancy from Sacred Heart College of Lucena City in 1983 and became a certified public accountant in 1984. She pursued post-graduate studies at the National College of Public Administration and Governance at the University of the Philippines Diliman, where she earned a Master of Public Administration (MPA), and at the National Defense College of the Philippines, where she completed a Master in National Security Administration (MNSA).

== Career ==
Mendoza previously worked with the Asian Development Bank (ADB) and was a member of the board of advisers of the Ateneo de Manila University School of Government.

=== Commission on Audit ===
Mendoza served as commissioner of the Commission on Audit (COA) from April 18, 2011, to November 11, 2015. During her tenure, she was recognized for her efforts in promoting transparency and accountability in government transactions. She played a key role in uncovering irregularities in public funds, earning her a reputation as a staunch advocate against corruption.

On February 3, 2015, Mendoza was named Officer in Charge (OIC) of COA following the end of chairperson Grace Pulido-Tan's term the previous day. Mendoza served in that role until March 25, when President Benigno Aquino III appointed Michael Aguinaldo as the new permanent chairperson of COA.

=== Under-Secretary-General of OIOS ===
On October 6, 2015, Mendoza was nominated by UN Secretary-General Ban Ki-moon to head the United Nations Office of Internal Oversight Services (OIOS), replacing Canadian Carman Lapointe. She served in this role until October 17, 2019, overseeing internal audits, investigations, and inspections to ensure the integrity of the United Nations' operations worldwide. Mendoza has also served as an external auditor for the Food and Agriculture Organization, World Health Organization, and International Labour Organization.

== Whistleblowing efforts ==
=== 2011 Armed Forces of the Philippines corruption scandal ===
Heidi Mendoza gained national prominence in 2011 as a whistleblower and former Commission on Audit (COA) auditor who uncovered significant corruption within the Armed Forces of the Philippines (AFP). She exposed irregularities involving the diversion of military funds, including a missing PHP 200 million United Nations fund intended to support AFP troops in peacekeeping missions, as well as a broader unaudited pool of discretionary funds estimated at PHP 1.5 billion. Her testimonies revealed allegations that high-ranking AFP officials, including former military comptroller General Carlos Garcia, were involved in siphoning off millions of pesos meant for soldiers’ pensions and allowances. Mendoza's disclosures led to official investigations and public attention.

She reported facing personal risk, including receiving death threats as a consequence of her whistleblowing activities. Her revelations brought attention to systemic corruption in the AFP and were cited by commentators as demonstrating her commitment to public service and ethical standards.

== Politics ==
=== 2025 Senate bid ===
In the 2025 Philippine Senate election, Mendoza ran as an independent. Her platform focused on empowering budget literacy through legislation that will teach people about the government's financial activities, as well as advocating for the abolishment of any form of pork barrel funding. Despite garnering over 8.7 million votes, she finished in 21st place and did not secure a seat. Analysts noted her performance as impressive for a first-time, independent candidate focused on governance reforms.

=== Political views ===
Mendoza has been vocal about the need to abolish pork barrel funds, which have been associated with corruption and misuse of public resources. Her Senate platform emphasizes budget literacy, aiming to educate citizens about government financial activities. She believes that an informed public is essential for holding leaders accountable and ensuring the proper allocation of resources.

Mendoza acknowledges that corruption remains a pervasive issue in the Philippines, stating, "People tend to be resigned to it. But I want to get rid of the feeling that corruption is a way of life. I want people to have hope in their hearts that things will change."

Mendoza has expressed her views on several proposed legislative bills. She states that she does not support legalizing divorce, rooted in her belief in the sanctity of marriage. However, she acknowledges "dead" or profoundly hurtful marriages and suggests exploring limited dissolution provisions for extreme cases. On same-sex marriage, she describes her view as “qualified no” but won't block a civil unions legislation and remains open to discussions and further review of the SOGIE Bill. Her stance has drawn mixed reactions, with some individuals in the community remaining critical while others continue to support her, prioritizing her anti-corruption initiatives over disagreements on legislative issues.

Mendoza has also called for an anti-political dynasty law, arguing that government should not be treated as a family business. In a 2025 post, she shared anecdotes from her COA days about family disputes over public funds, emphasizing how such dynamics harm national politics.

== Electoral history ==
Electoral history of Heidi Mendoza
Year	Office	Party	Votes received				Result
Year	Office	Party	Total	%	P.	Swing	Result
2025	Senator of the Philippines	Independent	8,759,732	15.27%	21st	—N/a	Lost
