= Eastern Regional Organization for Public Administration =

- Logo of the Eastern Regional Organization for Public Administration (EROPA)
- Abbreviation: EROPA
- Formation: 5 December 1960 (65 years ago)
- Type: International non-governmental organization (NGO)
- Purpose: Public administration and governance education and practice
- Headquarters: National College of Public Administration and Governance, University of the Philippines, Quezon City, Philippines
- Location: Philippines, South Korea, Japan, India, China
- Coordinates: 14.656294°N 121.0598308°E
- Region served: Asia Pacific
- Members: 11 state members; 100 institutional members; 667 individual members
- Secretary-General: Alex Brillantes Jr.
- Website: www.eropa.co

The Eastern Regional Organization for Public Administration (EROPA) was formed "In order to advance the economic and social development of the Region through the promotion of the study, practice and status of public administration and adoption of adequate administrative systems", by international treaty signed in Manila in the Philippines on 19 June 1958. EROPA was officially formed on 5 December 1960.

EROPA is a partner of the United Nations Public Administration Network (UNPAN). EROPA also has special consultative status with the United Nations Economic and Social Council.

The Philippines remains the center for its activities, since having hosted the first Regional Conference on Public Administration 7 to 20 June 1958, with EROPA being based out of National College of Public Administration and Governance, University of the Philippines, Quezon City, Philippines.

In addition to the headquarters in the Philippines, it has four active centers:

- Development Management Center (South Korea) in conjunction with the National Human Resources Development Institute in Gyeonggi Province
- Human Resource Research Center (formerly E-Government Research Center) (China) in conjunction with the Chinese Academy of Personnel Science in Beijing
- Local Government Center (Japan) in conjunction with the Local Autonomy College in Tokyo
- Policy Studies Center (Indonesia) in conjunction with the National Institute of Public Administration in Jakarta.
- Training Center (India) in conjunction with the Indian Institute of Public Administration in New Delhi

== Membership ==
The membership of EROPA includes states, institutions, and individuals.

(Current/Active) State members:

1. Philippines (founding member)
2. Japan (founding member)
3. Vietnam (founding member)
4. China (assumed from the founder member Taiwan)
5. Thailand (1961)
6. South Korea (1962)
7. Malaysia (1966, 2022)
8. Indonesia (1969)
9. Nepal (1983)

(Current/Inactive) State members

1. Iran (1963)
2. India (1985)

(Former) State members:

1. Australia (founding member)
2. Pakistan (1965)
3. Papua New Guinea (1976)
4. Bangladesh (1995)

== Conferences ==
List of conferences organized by EROPA (as per their website):

Topic	Place	Date
First Regional Conference on Public Administration (formed EROPA)	Manila, Philippines	June 7–20, 1958
Strengthening Local Administration for Economic and Social Development	Manila, Philippines	December 1960
Urban Administration and Economic Development	Tokyo, Japan	October to November 1961
Personnel Management and Administration	Bangkok, Thailand	October 1962
Central Services to Local Authorities	New Delhi, India	October to November 1963
Financing Development	Tokyo, Japan	May to June 1964
Organizing for Development	Seoul, South Korea	November 1964
Technical Assistance	Bangkok, Thailand	January 1965
Asian Consultative Conference on Foreign Service Development	Manila, Philippines	September to October 1965
Administration of Land Reform for Rural Development	Taipei, Taiwan	October 1965
The Role of Public Administration in National Development	Berlin, Germany and New Delhi, India	October to November 1966
Administration of Social Development	Tehran, Iran	December 1966
Administrative Reforms in Asia	Kuala Lumpur, Malaysia	June 1968
Population Growth in Asia	Philippines	April 1970
Administrative Implications of Rapid Population Growth in Asia	Manila, Philippines	May 1971
Curriculum for Development Administration	Bangkok, Thailand	November 1971
Implementation: The Problem of Achieving Results	Tokyo, Japan	October 1973
Asian Development Strategies and the Role of Public Enterprises	Tehran, Iran	October 1976
Reassessment of Public Administration	Indonesia	November 1977
The Management of Integrated Rural Development	Jakarta, Indonesia	June 1981
Social Change and Administrative Reforms Towards the Year 2000	Seoul, South Korea	October 1983
Local Government and Rural Development	Philippines	November 1983
Delivery of Public Services in National Development	Bangkok, Thailand	December 1985
Power and Social Responsibility: Elections in Asia and the Pacific	Philippines	February 2–6, 1986
Public Administration in a Changing National and International Environment	Manila, Philippines	November 1987
Public Administration in the 1990s: Challenges and Opportunities	Kathmandu, Nepal	December 1989
Accountability in the Public Service	Malaysia	October 1990
Administrative Reforms Towards Promoting Productivity in Bureaucratic Performance	Beijing, China	October 1991
Decentralization Towards Democratization and Development	South Korea	October 1992
Public Administration and Sustainable Development	Tehran, Iran	November 1993
Comparative Public Sector Reform	Australia	November to December 1994
New Trends in Public Administration for the Asia Pacific Region: Decentralization	Tokyo, Japan	September 1995
Public Administration in Promoting Economic Development	Manila, Philippines	March 1996
Public Service Management: Achieving Quality Performance in the 21st Century	Kuala Lumpur, Malaysia	November 1997
Administration in Transition	Macau SAR, China	October 1998
From Government to Governance	Manila, Philippines	June 1999
Developing Asia's Public Services: Sharing Best Practice	Hong Kong SAR, China	October 2000
Governance as Partnership: State, Civil Society and Market Organizations	Bangkok, Thailand	November 2002
Public Administration and Globalization: Challenges, Opportunities and Options	New Delhi, India	October 2003
Globalization, Security and Development	Apia, Samoa	October 2004
Role of Public Administration and Governance Stakeholders in Attaining the Millennium Development Goals	Hanoi, Vietnam	October 2005
Modernizing the Civil Service in Alignment with National Development Goals	Bandar Seri Begawan, Brunei Darussalam	November 2006
Service Quality in the Public Sector: An Outcome-Based Approach	Tehran, Islamic Republic of Iran	November 2007
Governance in a Triptych: Environment, Migration, Peace and Order	Manila, Philippines	October 2008
Public Governance in Challenging Economic Times: Human Resource Development at the Battlefront	Seoul, Korea	October 2009
Public Administration and Disaster Management	Kathmandu, Nepal	November 2010
Challenges, Opportunities and Innovations in Public Administration in the Next Decade	Bangkok, Thailand	February 19–23, 2012
Challenges to Administrative Reform: Learning from the Past and in Search of Excellence in the Future	Jakarta, Indonesia	October 28 - November 1, 2012
Enhancing the Quality of Government: Government, Governability and Governance	Tokyo, Japan	October 15–19, 2013
Public Administration and Governance in the Context of Regional and Global Integration	Hanoi, Vietnam	October 19–24, 2014
Modernization of Governance: Reforms and Good Practices in Emerging Markets	Shanghai, China	October 17–21, 2015
iGovernance: INNOVATIVE. INCLUSIVE. INTEGRITY-BASED	Manila, Philippines	October 10–14, 2016
The Role of Public Governance in Achieving Sustainable Development Goals: Transforming, Empowering and Network-Building	Seoul, South Korea	September 11–15, 2017
Public Administration in Managing Global Megatrends: People, Public Services, Institutions, and Ethics	Bali, Indonesia	September 16–20, 2018
The Future of Public Administration: Rethinking Resilience, Equity, and Sustainability in the Region and Beyond	Manila, Philippines	September 22–27, 2019
Public Governance for Inclusive Growth: Accountability, Engagement, and Digital Transformation in a Post-COVID-19 Pandemic Era	(virtual) Bangkok, Thailand	July 30, August 2–3, 2021
Governance and Public Administration in COVID-19 Pandemic: Learning, Innovations, and Reforms in Managing Global Changes	(virtual) Kathmandu, Nepal	September 13–15, 2022

== Publications ==
EROPA produces the biannual journal Asian Review of Public Administration (ARPA) since 1989. The organization also produces the quarterly newsletter EROPA Bulletin since 1976.
