= Virden, Manitoba =

Town in Manitoba, Canada

Virden
- Town
- Town of Virden
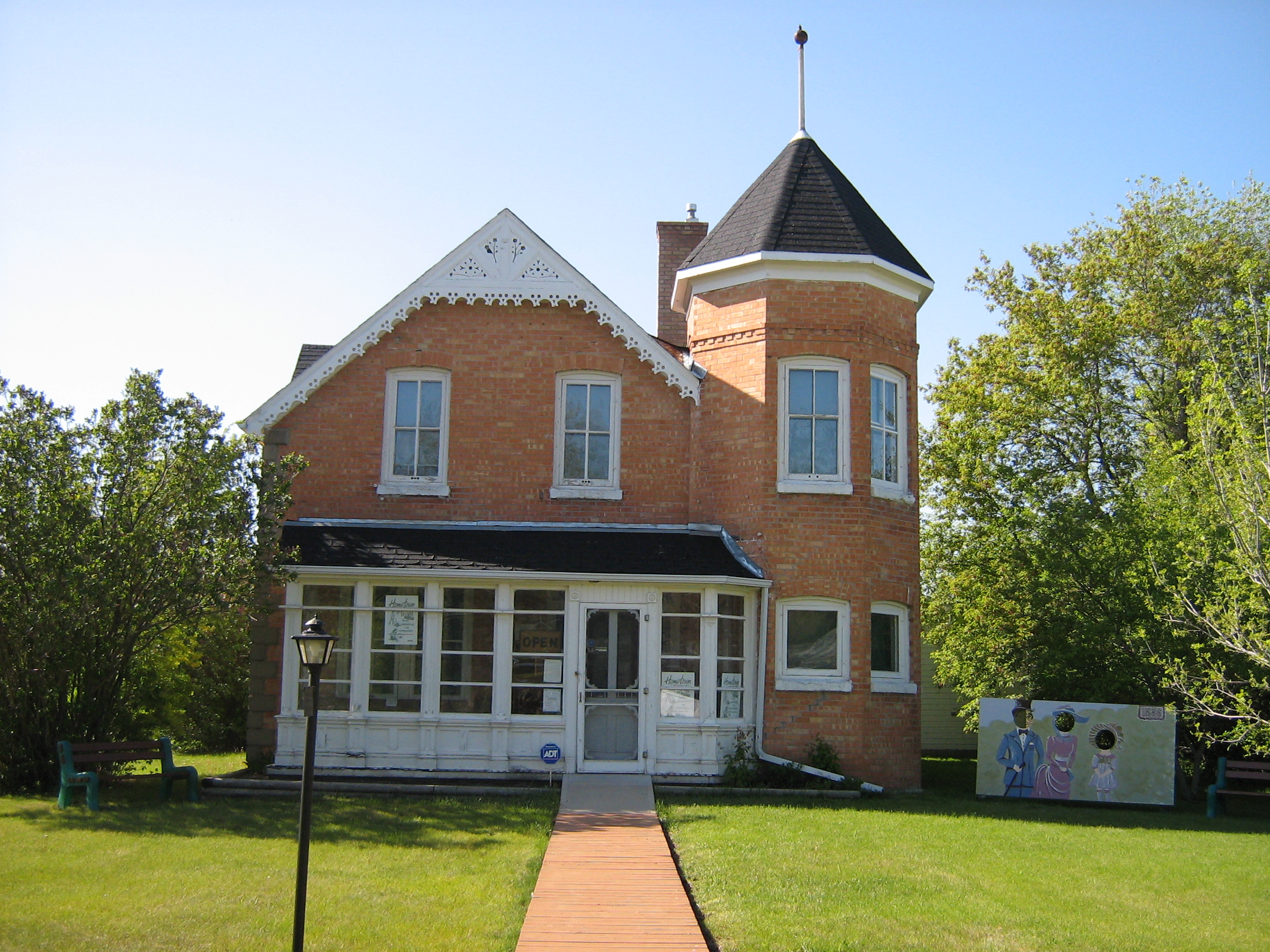
- Virden Pioneer Home Museum

- Town boundaries

- Location in Manitoba
- Coordinates: 49°51′03″N 100°55′54″W
- Country: Canada
- Province: Manitoba

Government
  - Mayor: Tina Williams
  - MLA: Doyle Piwniuk (PC)
  - MP: Grant Jackson (CPC)

Area
  - Total: 8.96 km^{2} (3.46 sq mi)
- Elevation (at airport): 439 m (1,440 ft)

Population (2021)
  - Total: 3,118
  - Density: 348/km^{2} (901/sq mi)
- Time zone: UTC−5 (CST)
- Postal code: R0M 2C0
- Area codes: 204, 431
- Telephone Exchange: 204 491 512 707 718 748 851 431 645
- Median Income: $46,604
- Website: www.virden.ca

Virden is a town in southwestern Manitoba, Canada. Oil was first discovered in 1951, and Virden has since come to be known as the "Oil Capital of Manitoba".

== History ==
Virden has its roots as a farming community known as Gopher Creek. However, it became a railway tent town in 1882, and grew in population due to the brick and flour industry, as well as with the discovery of oil in the 1950s. The origin of the name, Virden, allegedly arose as a misspelling of the German town Verden in the homeland of the 7th Duke of Manchester's wife, Louisa Cavendish, Duchess of Devonshire.

== Geography ==
The town is located at the junction of the Trans-Canada Highway (also known as Highway #1) and Highway 83 (the "Palms to Pines" route) and is surrounded by the Rural Municipality of Wallace – Woodworth. Virden is a regional service centre owing in part to its location, and it has a stable commercial sector, including several restaurants, gas stations, body shops, a movie theatre, and a performing arts theatre.

=== Climate ===
Climate data for Virden
Month	Jan	Feb	Mar	Apr	May	Jun	Jul	Aug	Sep	Oct	Nov	Dec	Year
Record high °C (°F)	9.7 (49.5)	17 (63)	20 (68)	36 (97)	37 (99)	42.8 (109.0)	43.3 (109.9)	38.5 (101.3)	37.8 (100.0)	34 (93)	23.5 (74.3)	12.8 (55.0)	43.3 (109.9)
Mean daily maximum °C (°F)	−11.5 (11.3)	−7.1 (19.2)	−0.3 (31.5)	10.5 (50.9)	18.7 (65.7)	22.8 (73.0)	25.5 (77.9)	24.6 (76.3)	18.2 (64.8)	11.1 (52.0)	−0.6 (30.9)	−8.9 (16.0)	8.6 (47.5)
Daily mean °C (°F)	−16.7 (1.9)	−12.2 (10.0)	−5.3 (22.5)	4.2 (39.6)	11.9 (53.4)	16.6 (61.9)	19 (66)	18 (64)	11.9 (53.4)	5.2 (41.4)	−5.1 (22.8)	−13.7 (7.3)	2.8 (37.0)
Mean daily minimum °C (°F)	−21.9 (−7.4)	−17.3 (0.9)	−10.2 (13.6)	−2.1 (28.2)	5.1 (41.2)	10.3 (50.5)	12.6 (54.7)	11.3 (52.3)	5.6 (42.1)	−0.8 (30.6)	−9.6 (14.7)	−14.6 (5.7)	−3 (27)
Record low °C (°F)	−42.2 (−44.0)	−44.4 (−47.9)	−43.3 (−45.9)	−26.7 (−16.1)	−12.2 (10.0)	−2.2 (28.0)	0 (32)	−4.4 (24.1)	−10 (14)	−21 (−6)	−38.9 (−38.0)	−40 (−40)	−44.4 (−47.9)
Average precipitation mm (inches)	21.3 (0.84)	17 (0.7)	26.7 (1.05)	30.1 (1.19)	49.6 (1.95)	77.2 (3.04)	66.1 (2.60)	61 (2.4)	49.7 (1.96)	30.9 (1.22)	22.7 (0.89)	22.1 (0.87)	474.3 (18.67)
Source: Environment Canada

== Demographics ==
Historical population
Year	Pop.	±%
1901	901	—
1911	1,550	+72.0%
1921	1,361	−12.2%
1931	1,590	+16.8%
1941	1,619	+1.8%
1951	1,746	+7.8%
1961	2,708	+55.1%
1996	3,137	+15.8%
2001	3,109	−0.9%
2006	3,010	−3.2%
2011	3,114	+3.5%
2016	3,322	+6.7%
2021	3,118	−6.1%

In the 2021 Census of Population conducted by Statistics Canada, Virden had a population of 3,118 living in 1,401 of its 1,508 total private dwellings, a change of −6.1% from its 2016 population of 3,322. With a land area of 8.96 km^{2} (3.46 sq mi), it had a population density of 348.0/km^{2} (901.3/sq mi) in 2021.

In 2011, the median age was 42.7 years old which is 2 years older than the national average at 40.6 years old. There were 1,446 dwellings in Virden with an occupancy rate of 95.1%, and the median cost of a dwelling at $159,748, more than $100,000 lower than the national average at $280,552.

According to the 2011 National Household Survey, 96.8% of Virden residents are Canadian citizens, and about 3.2% of residents are recent immigrants (from 2001 to 2011). The racial make up of Virden is mostly Caucasian (92.0%), with a moderate Aboriginal population (5.5%); First Nations (2.0%), Métis (3.5%), and a small visible minority population (2.7%), most of which are Filipino (2.0%) or multiracial (0.5%).

== Attractions ==
=== Virden Pioneer Home Museum ===
Known as the "Victorian Home on the Prairies", the Virden Pioneer Home Museum is located within a red brick veneer home built by James Frame in 1888. With an extensive collection of over eleven thousand donated artifacts relating to Virden and area, the museum is a must-see tourist destination. It is open May to September where guided tours are offered by knowledgeable guides. The museum is located at 390 King Street West in Virden.

== Notable people ==
- Mary Carter, one of the first female judges in Saskatchewan; resided in Virden during childhood.
- Isabella Dryden, educator and centenarian
- Happy Felsch, American baseball player who played in Virden in the late 1920s after being banned for involvement in the Black Sox Scandal.
- Dorothy Ferguson, infielder and outfielder who played from 1945 through 1954 in the All-American Girls Professional Baseball League
- Jim Murray, former NHL player
- Bud Sketchley, former right fielder for the Chicago White Sox
- Jim Treliving, Co-owner of Boston Pizza
- Lila Bell Acheson Wallace, Co-founder of the Reader's Digest
- Warren Winkler, former Chief Justice of Ontario
- Carman Lapointe-Young, Under-Secretary-General for the United Nations Office of Internal Oversight Services

== See also ==
- RCAF Station Virden
- Tundra Oil & Gas Place
- Virden/R.J. (Bob) Andrew Field Regional Aerodrome
- Virden Oil Capitals
- Virden (West) Airport
- Virden (Gabrielle Farm) Airport
