= New Brunswick-Prince Edward Island Major Midget Hockey League =

- Sport: Ice hockey
- Founded: 2002
- First season: 2002-03
- No. of teams: 6
- Most recent champion: (New Brunswick) Moncton Flyers
- Most titles: (New Brunswick) Moncton Flyers (6)
- Related competitions: Telus Cup
- Website: http://www.nbpeimajormidget.ca

The New Brunswick-Prince Edward Island Major Midget Hockey League is a Canadian midget 'AAA' ice hockey league operating in the provinces of New Brunswick and Prince Edward Island. The inter-branch league operates under the supervision of Hockey New Brunswick and Hockey PEI.

== History ==
The league was created by Hockey New Brunswick and Hockey PEI in 2002 to provide a more competitive development league for both provinces. The new league replaced the existing major midget leagues in both provinces. Both branches continue to operate their respective minor midget leagues as feeder leagues for the major midget league.

Upon its formation, it was decided that the league would have six teams – four from New Brunswick and two from PEI. The five of the six original teams are still in the league today while the Kensington Wild joined in the 2013–2014 season.

== Teams ==
=== Current ===
(Prince Edward Island) Charlottetown Knights
(New Brunswick) Fredericton Caps
(Prince Edward Island) Kensington Wild
(New Brunswick) Moncton Flyers
(New Brunswick) Northern Moose
(New Brunswick) Saint John Vitos

=== Former ===
(Prince Edward Island) Cornwall Superior Thunder

== Championship ==
The team finishing with the best record during the regular season is named league champion.

Separate playoffs are held for the New Brunswick and PEI teams. The New Brunswick teams play in a two-round playoff to compete for their provincial championship, with the two PEI teams face each other in a playoff series for their championship. The respective provincial champions qualify for the Telus Cup Atlantic Regional Championship, where they compete for a berth in the national championship.

=== Champions ===
- 2002-03 Fredericton
- 2003-04 Fredericton
- 2004-05 Fredericton
- 2005-06 Saint John
- 2006-07 Charlottetown
- 2007-08 Moncton
- 2008-09 Moncton
- 2009-10 Miramichi
- 2010-11 Fredericton
- 2011-12 Moncton
- 2012-13 Moncton
- 2013-14 Moncton
- 2014-15 Moncton
