= 1991 Air Canada Cup =

Tournament details
- Venue: Max Bell Centre in Calgary, AB
- Dates: April 23 – 28, 1991
- Teams: 6

Final positions
- Champions: Calgary; Northstars
- Runners-up: Sherwood Park; Chain Gang
- Third place: Lions du Lac St-Louis

Awards
- MVP: Kane Chaloner

The 1991 Air Canada Cup was Canada's 13th annual national midget 'AAA' hockey championship, which was played April 23 – 28, 1991 at the Max Bell Centre in Calgary, Alberta.

The gold medal game was an all-Alberta showdown, as the Calgary Northstars defeated the Sherwood Park Chain Gang to become the third host team to win the national midget title. Shawn Davis scored the game-tying goal for the Northstars and Scott Bradford the game-winner in the Northstars' 2–1 defeat of the Chain Gang. Bradford was the game MVP and Davis was subsequently voted the Northstars' most improved player. Davis and Bradford were among the 5 first year Northstars players, along with future NHLer Norm Maracle (who won 3 major IHL awards in 2001 including regular season and playoff MVP, and best goalie), future minor leaguer and WPHL 1998 Champion Corey Heon, as well as Colin Gowen. Two then future NHL stars (i) long time Oilers Captain and later Flyers Captain, Jason Smith and (ii) the youngest Captain in Islanders history and later Captain of the Panthers, Bryan McCabe (who has his name etched in two Stanley Cups as the Panthers' Director of Player Personnel) were eligible to play for the Northstars during the 1990–91 season but opted instead to play for affiliate teams, highlighting the depth of the Northstars organization. Many Northstars alumni have held senior positions in global companies, highlighting also the focus of the organization on academics and personal growth, along with athletics and hockey skills development.

The Lions du Lac St-Louis defeated the Winnipeg Hawks to win the bronze medal. The Lions du Lac St-Louis have thrice won the Air Canada Cup.

Future National Hockey League players competing in the 1991 Air Canada Cup were Manny Fernandez, Norm Maracle, Tyson Nash, and Brad Chartrand.

Calgary Northstars drafted to the NHL include, notably, the NHL Draft Overall selection number: 3 in 1986 (Neil Brady), 4 in 1987 (Wayne MacBean), 18 in 1992 (Jason Smith), 29 in 2004 (Mike Green), 39 in 1989 (Brent Thompson; father of Tage Thompson of the Buffalo Sabres), 55 in 2007 (T.J. Galiardi), 57 in 1989 (Wes Walz) & 63 in 1989 (Corey Lyons). Each of Smith, Green and Walz had key leadership roles and highly successful careers on their respective NHL teams. Smith served as Captain for the Edmonton Oilers and Philadelphia Flyers and Walz served as Captain for the Minnesota Wild. In 2009 & 2010 Green was selected to the NHL First All-Star Team and was a finalist for the Norris Trophy (best defenseman). On Feb. 14, 2009, Green set an NHL record for the longest goal-scoring streak by a defenseman at eight games. In 2008–09, Green scored an incredible 31 goals in just 68 regular season games (0.456 goals per game). The only defensemen in NHL history to have a higher regular season goal scoring percentage are superstars Bobby Orr and Paul Coffey. Jay Beagle, who also played for the Calgary Northstars, went undrafted before joining the Washington Capitals. He had a successful career, including winning the Stanley Cup with the Capitals in 2018. Beagle is known to have been one of the strongest players in the history of the NHL with impressive performances in NHL strength metrics such as the bench press. His success story is one of perseverance and being a "late bloomer".

In 2003, the Calgary Northstars defeated the Gaulois du Collège Antoine-Girouard 5–1 in the gold medal game to win the Air Canada Cup. The Calgary Northstars won the silver medal at the 1988 Air Canada Cup. They also won Gold and Silver at the Global Macs Major Midget 'AAA' tournament in 1987 and 1996, respectively.

The Air Canada Cup (since 2004, the Telus Cup) is Canada's national 18 and under ice hockey club championship. It is an annual event, held by Hockey Canada each April, and many players have gone on to have very successful careers in the National Hockey League (NHL) the #1 ice hockey league globally.

== Teams ==
Result	Team	Region	City
1st place, gold medalist(s)	Calgary Northstars	Host	Calgary, AB
2nd place, silver medalist(s)	Sherwood Park Chain Gang	Pacific	Sherwood Park, AB
3rd place, bronze medalist(s)	Lions du Lac St-Louis	Quebec	Dollard-des-Ormeaux, QC
4	Winnipeg Hawks	West	Winnipeg, MB
5	Fredericton Canadiens	Atlantic	Fredericton, NB
6	Hamilton Huskies	Central	Hamilton, ON

== Round robin ==
=== Standings ===
Pos	Team	Pld	W	L	D	GF	GA	GD	Pts
1	Lions du Lac St-Louis	5	5	0	0	16	10	+6	10
2	Calgary Northstars	5	3	1	1	21	10	+11	7
3	Winnipeg Hawks	5	2	3	0	17	23	−6	4
4	Sherwood Park Chain Gang	5	2	3	0	17	19	−2	4
5	Fredericton Canadiens	5	1	3	1	18	15	+3	3
6	Hamilton Huskies	5	1	4	0	15	27	−12	2

=== Scores ===
- Calgary 6 - Hamilton 2
- Sherwood Park 3 - Fredericton 2
- Lac St-Louis 5 - Winnipeg 3
- Calgary 2 - Fredericton 2
- Sherwood Park 5 - Hamilton 2
- Calgary 6 - Winnipeg 1
- Lac St-Louis 3 - Sherwood Park 2
- Hamilton 7 - Fredericton 6
- Lac St-Louis 2 - Calgary 1
- Winnipeg 6 - Sherwood Park 4
- Lac St-Louis 3 - Hamilton 2
- Fredericton 6 - Winnipeg 0
- Calgary 6 - Sherwood Park 3
- Winnipeg 7 - Hamilton 2
- Lac St-Louis 3 - Fredericton 2

== Playoffs ==
=== Semi-finals ===
- Sherwood Park 5 - Lac St-Louis 3
- Calgary 6 - Winnipeg 3

=== Bronze-medal game ===
- Lac St-Louis 5 - Winnipeg 2

=== Gold-medal game ===
- Calgary 2 - Sherwood Park 1

== Individual awards ==
- Most Valuable Player: Kane Chaloner (Winnipeg)
- Most Sportsmanlike Player: Brad Chartrand (Winnipeg)

== See also ==
- Telus Cup
