= United Nations Office of Internal Oversight Services =

UN office in the United Nations Secretariat

Office of Internal Oversight Services

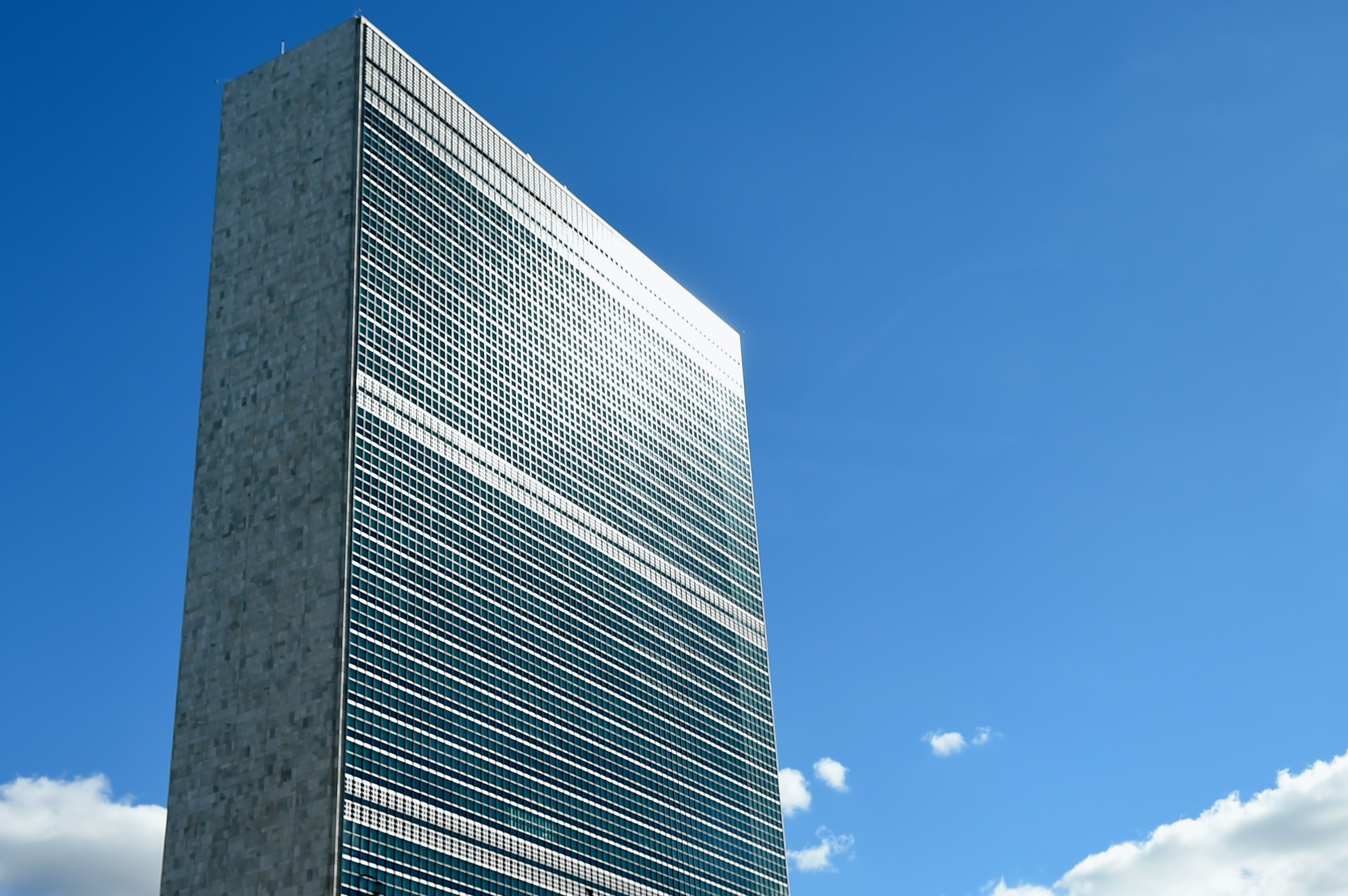
- United Nations Headquarters, New York City
- Abbreviation: OIOS
- Formation: 1994
- Legal status: Active
- Head: Fatoumata Ndiaye; Under-Secretary-General
- Parent organization: United Nations Secretariat
- Website: oios.un.org

The United Nations Office of Internal Oversight Services (OIOS) is an independent office in the United Nations Secretariat whose mandate is to "assist the Secretary-General in fulfilling his internal oversight responsibilities in respect of the resources and staff of the Organization." Specifically, activities include internal audit, investigation, monitoring, evaluation, inspection, reporting and support services to the United Nations Secretariat.

Its intended and mandated function is similar to many national government audit organisations, like the Government Accountability Office in the United States. It reports not only to the General Assembly, but also to the Secretary-General.

The current head of the OIOS, Under-Secretary-General Fatoumata Ndiaye of Senegal, was appointed as Under-Secretary-General for Internal Oversight Services for a five-year term starting on 17 October 2019, succeeding Heidi Mendoza of the Philippines.

The office was established in 1994 at the insistence of the United States that the UN take steps to curb waste and corruption, although there are some doubts concerning its effectiveness. Its first head was Under-Secretary-General Karl Theodor Paschke.

== Role and function ==
According to its website:

The Office submits reports to the Secretary-General that provide insight into the effective utilization of the resources of the Organization and the protection of its assets and also makes these reports available to the General Assembly. OIOS adds value by providing world-wide audit, investigation, inspection, programme monitoring, evaluation and consulting services to the United Nations Secretariat and a wide range of United Nations operational funds, programmes and tribunals. OIOS sees itself as an agent of change, committed to help client departments and offices bring about responsible administration of resources and a culture of accountability, transparency, results-orientation and risk awareness.

== Organizational Structure ==
The United Nations Office of Internal Oversight Services is divided into various offices and divisions including:

- Under Secretary General
  - Assistant Secretary General
    - Office of the Under Secretary General
      - Senior Programme Officer
    - Executive Office
      - Executive Officer
    - Internal Audit Division
      - Director
        - Deputy Director
          - New York Audit Service Chief
          - Peacekeeping Audit Service Chief
          - UNHCR Audit Service Chief
    - Investigations Division
      - Director
        - New York Service Chief
        - Vienna Service Chief
        - Nairobi/Entebbe Service Chief
    - Inspection and Evaluation Division
      - Director
        - Deputy Director

== Under-Secretaries-General ==
#	Portrait	Under-Secretary-General	Dates in office	Nationality
1		Karl Theodor Paschke	1 January 1994 – 31 December 1999	Germany
2		Dileep Nair	24 April 2000 – 23 April 2005	Singapore
3		Inga-Britt Ahlenius	15 July 2005 – 14 July 2010	Sweden
4		Carman Lapointe	14 September 2010 – 6 October 2015	Canada
5		Heidi Mendoza	15 November 2015 – 17 October 2019	Philippines
6		Fatoumata Ndiaye	17 October 2019 – Incumbent	Senegal

== See also ==
- PassBlue
- UN Watch
