= 2010–11 OJHL season =

- League: Ontario Junior Hockey League
- Sport: Hockey
- Duration: Regular season 2010-09-09 – 2011-02-13; Playoffs; 2011-02-14 – 2011-04-12
- Teams: 31
- Finals champions: Wellington Dukes

OJHL seasons
- 2009–10 OJAHL ← 2009-10 CCHL 2011–12 OJHL

The 2010–11 OJHL season is the 17th season of the Ontario Junior Hockey League (OJHL) and the first since the league existed as two separate bodies in 2009–10. The thirty-one teams of the North, South, East and West Divisions will play 50-game schedules.

Come February, the top teams of each division will play down for the Frank L. Buckland Trophy, the OJHL championship. The winner of the Buckland Cup will compete in the Central Canadian Junior "A" championship, the Dudley Hewitt Cup. If successful against the winners of the Northern Ontario Junior Hockey League and Superior International Junior Hockey League, the champion would then move on to play in the Canadian Junior Hockey League championship, the 2011 Royal Bank Cup.

== Changes ==
- OJHL is reformed.
- Ajax Attack are gone, they merged into the Pickering Panthers.
- Bowmanville Eagles are gone, they merged into the Cobourg Cougars.
- Bramalea Blues, Couchiching Terriers, Seguin Bruins fold.
- Collingwood Blues change name to Collingwood Blackhawks.
- Orangeville Crushers change name to Orangeville Flyers.

== Current Standings ==
Note: GP = Games played; W = Wins; L = Losses; OTL = Overtime losses; SL = Shootout losses; GF = Goals for; GA = Goals against; PTS = Points; x = clinched playoff berth; y = clinched division title; z = clinched conference title

North-West Conference
North Division
Team	Centre	W–L–OTL–SOL	Points
Newmarket Hurricanes	Newmarket, Ontario	40-7-0-3	83
Markham Waxers	Markham, Ontario	34-12-1-3	72
Stouffville Spirit	Stouffville, Ontario	33-11-3-3	72
Huntsville Otters	Huntsville, Ontario	25-17-1-7	58
Orangeville Flyers	Orangeville, Ontario	24-24-1-1	50
Aurora Tigers	Aurora, Ontario	22-25-3-0	47
Collingwood Blackhawks	Collingwood, Ontario	5-43-0-2	12
West Division
Team	Centre	W–L–OTL–SOL	Points
Burlington Cougars	Burlington, Ontario	38-8-3-1	80
Oakville Blades	Oakville, Ontario	36-12-0-2	74
Georgetown Raiders	Georgetown, Ontario	32-15-2-1	67
Hamilton Red Wings	Hamilton, Ontario	29-18-2-1	61
Brampton Capitals	Brampton, Ontario	22-24-4-0	48
Buffalo Jr. Sabres	Buffalo, New York	18-30-2-0	38
Mississauga Chargers	Mississauga, Ontario	12-34-3-1	28
Milton Icehawks	Milton, Ontario	5-41-3-1	14
South-East Conference
East Division
Team	Centre	W–L–OTL–SOL	Points
Wellington Dukes	Wellington, Ontario	38-7-2-3	81
Kingston Voyageurs	Kingston, Ontario	34-11-2-3	73
Peterborough Stars	Peterborough, Ontario	33-12-1-4	71
Lindsay Muskies	Lindsay, Ontario	30-18-0-2	62
Cobourg Cougars	Cobourg, Ontario	29-17-1-3	62
Whitby Fury	Whitby, Ontario	22-17-1-10	55
Trenton Golden Hawks	Trenton, Ontario	19-27-2-2	42
Pickering Panthers	Pickering, Ontario	14-33-1-2	31
South Division
Team	Centre	W–L–OTL–SOL	Points
Vaughan Vipers	Vaughan, Ontario	34-13-3-0	71
Villanova Knights	Toronto, Ontario	30-17-2-1	63
North York Rangers	Toronto, Ontario	28-19-2-1	59
Upper Canada Patriots	Toronto, Ontario	28-20-1-1	58
St. Michael's Buzzers	Toronto, Ontario	27-21-1-1	56
Toronto Jr. Canadiens	Toronto, Ontario	16-30-1-3	36
Streetsville Derbys	Toronto, Ontario	14-34-1-1	30
Dixie Beehives	Toronto, Ontario	4-43-2-1	11

Please note: Blue is for teams in the Top 3 of their Division and in line to earn a bye from the Qualifier Round. Green is for teams ranked 7th through 10th in their respective conference, who will be competing in the Qualifier Round

Teams listed on the official league website.

Standings listed by Pointstreak on official league website.

== 2010-11 Frank L. Buckland Trophy Playoffs ==
Breakdown:Top 3 in each Division make Conference Quarter-final, 7th through 10th in each conference must compete in best-of-3 Qualifier to make Conference Quarter-final. In the league semi-final, instead of a Conference Championship, they are doing a crossover round.

Qualifier
N8	Huntsville	0
N9	Orangeville	2
N7	Hamilton	2
N10	Brampton	1
S8	Lindsay	1
S9	Upper Canada	2
S7	Cobourg	2
S10	St. Michael's	1

Round of 16
N1	Newmarket	4
N9	Orangeville	1
N4	Markham	2
N5	Stouffville	4
N2	Burlington	4
N7	Hamilton	0
N3	Oakville	4
N6	Georgetown	1
S1	Wellington	4
S9	Upper Canada	0
S4	Peterborough	1
S5	Villanova	4
S2	Vaughan	4
S6	North York	0
S3	Kingston	4
S7	Cobourg	3

Round of 8
N1	Newmarket	3
N5	Stouffville	4
N2	Burlington	2
N3	Oakville	4
S1	Wellington	4
S5	Villanova	1
S2	Vaughan	1
S3	Kingston	4

Crossover Rd of 4
N3	Oakville	4
S3	Kingston	3
S1	Wellington	4
N5	Stouffville	2

Buckland Cup Final
N3	Oakville	1
S1	Wellington	4

Playoff results are listed by Pointstreak on the official league website.

== Dudley Hewitt Cup Championship ==
Hosted by the Huntsville Otters in Huntsville, Ontario. The Wellington Dukes finished in first place, the Huntsville Otters finished in second place.

Round Robin

Wellington Dukes 7 - Wisconsin Wilderness (SIJHL) 2
Huntsville Otters 6 - Soo Eagles (NOJHL) 4
Wellington Dukes 7 - Soo Eagles (NOJHL) 1
Huntsville Otters 4 - Wisconsin Wilderness (SIJHL) 3
Huntsville Otters 3 - Wellington Dukes 2 in double overtime

Semi-final

Wellington Dukes 3 - Soo Eagles (NOJHL) 2 in quadruple overtime

Final

Wellington Dukes 5 - Huntsville Otters 3

== 2011 Royal Bank Cup Championship ==
Hosted by the Camrose Kodiaks in Camrose, Alberta. The Wellington Dukes finished the round robin in fourth and were eliminated in the semi-final.

Round Robin

Camrose Kodiaks (AJHL) 3 - Wellington Dukes 2
Pembroke Lumber Kings (CCHL) 5 - Wellington Dukes 2
Vernon Vipers (BCHL) 5 - Wellington Dukes 2
Wellington Dukes 6 - Portage Terriers (MJHL) 3

Semi-final

Vernon Vipers (BCHL) 4 - Wellington Dukes 1

== Scoring leaders ==
Note: GP = Games played; G = Goals; A = Assists; Pts = Points; PIM = Penalty minutes

Player	Team	GP	G	A	Pts	PIM
Phil Brewer	Burlington Cougars	48	39	70	109	42
Zach Hyman	Hamilton Red Wings	43	42	60	102	24
James Woodcroft	Brampton Capitals	48	52	49	101	96
Matt Neal	Stouffville Spirit	50	40	60	100	20
Patrick Marsh	Burlington Cougars	49	41	57	98	26
Mason Baptista	Villanova Knights	49	25	59	84	59
Matt Carey	Hamilton Red Wings	45	25	59	84	40
Christian Finch	Stouffville Spirit	50	29	54	83	24
Daniel Ciampini	St. Michael's Buzzers	50	33	49	82	64
Matt Lorito	Villanova Knights	41	28	54	82	16

== Leading goaltenders ==
Note: GP = Games played; Mins = Minutes played; W = Wins; L = Losses: OTL = Overtime losses; SL = Shootout losses; GA = Goals Allowed; SO = Shutouts; GAA = Goals against average

Player	Team	GP	Mins	W	L	OTL	SOL	GA	SO	Sv%	GAA
Jimmy Sarjeant	Newmarket Hurricanes	21	1247:41	16	4	0	1	41	5	.937	1.97
Charlie Finn	Kingston Voyageurs	31	1781:46	23	4	0	3	57	4	.933	1.92
Jordan Ruby	Wellington Dukes	35	2088:32	26	5	2	2	77	3	.932	2.21
Leo Podolsky	Huntsville Otters	17	1011:45	9	5	0	2	37	0	.924	2.19
Ryan Demelo	North York Rangers	44	2592:59	24	17	1	1	116	4	.919	2.68

== Award winners ==
- Top Scorer - Phil Brewer (Burlington Cougars)
- Best Defenceman - Anthony Mastrodicasa (Vaughan Vipers)
- Most Gentlemanly Player - Zach Hyman (Hamilton Red Wings)
- Most Improved Player - Matt Neal (Stouffville Spirit)
- Most Valuable Player - Ryan Demelo (North York Rangers)
- Rookie of the Year - Robert Polesello (Vaughan Vipers)
- Coach of the Year - Brian Perrin (Newmarket Hurricanes)
- Best Goaltender - Charlie Finn (Kingston Voyageurs)

== Players selected in 2011 NHL entry draft ==
- Rd 3 #78 Brennan Serville - Winnipeg Jets (Stouffville Spirit)
- Rd 7 #209 Scott Wilson - Pittsburgh Penguins (Georgetown Raiders)

== See also ==
- 2011 Royal Bank Cup
- Dudley Hewitt Cup
- List of OJHL seasons
- Northern Ontario Junior Hockey League
- Superior International Junior Hockey League
- Greater Ontario Junior Hockey League
- 2010 in ice hockey
- 2011 in ice hockey

Preceded by 2009–10 OJAHL season 2009-10 CCHL season	OJHL seasons	Succeeded by 2011–12 OJHL season
