= 1992–93 CJAHL season =

- League: OHA Central Junior A Hockey League
- Sport: Hockey
- Duration: Regular season 1992-09 – 1993-02; Playoffs; 1993-02 – 1993-04
- Number of teams: 17
- Finals champions: Barrie Colts

CJAHL seasons
- ← 1992–93 CJBHL 1993–94 OPJHL →

The 1992–93 CJAHL season was the 1st and only season of the OHA's Central Junior A Hockey League (CJAHL), a pilot project that would become the Ontario Provincial Junior A Hockey League in 1993. The nine teams of the East Division competed in a 48-game schedule, while the eight teams of the West Division played a 49-game schedule. The top 7 teams of each division make the playoffs.

The winner of the CJAHL playoffs, the Barrie Colts, moved on to the OHA Junior B playoffs and won the Sutherland Cup.

== Changes ==
- Central Junior B Hockey League is elected to become pilot project for planned Junior A league.
- Cobourg Cougars join CJAHL from COJCHL.
- Aurora Eagles leave CJAHL for MetJHL.
- Streetsville Derbys move and become Mississauga Derbys.

== Final standings ==
Note: GP = Games played; W = Wins; L = Losses; OTL = Overtime losses; SL = Shootout losses; GF = Goals for; GA = Goals against; PTS = Points; x = clinched playoff berth; y = clinched division title; z = clinched conference title

East Division
| Team | GP | W | L | T | GF | GA | P |
| Barrie Colts | 48 | 47 | 0 | 1 | 436 | 145 | 95 |
| Markham Waxers | 48 | 33 | 13 | 2 | 293 | 222 | 69 |
| Peterborough Jr. Petes | 48 | 27 | 16 | 5 | 278 | 234 | 61 |
| Newmarket 87's | 48 | 23 | 21 | 4 | 257 | 236 | 51 |
| Orillia Terriers | 48 | 23 | 21 | 4 | 273 | 262 | 51 |
| Lindsay Bears | 48 | 22 | 25 | 1 | 254 | 269 | 45 |
| Ajax Axemen | 48 | 9 | 33 | 6 | 203 | 275 | 26 |
| Collingwood Blues | 48 | 10 | 36 | 2 | 162 | 355 | 23 |
| Cobourg Cougars | 48 | 8 | 37 | 3 | 183 | 341 | 23 |
West Division
| Team | GP | W | L | T | GF | GA | P |
| Brampton Capitals | 49 | 33 | 13 | 3 | 305 | 213 | 71 |
| Burlington Cougars | 49 | 33 | 13 | 3 | 274 | 212 | 70 |
| Milton Merchants | 49 | 32 | 15 | 2 | 269 | 190 | 68 |
| Caledon Canadians | 49 | 31 | 15 | 3 | 265 | 171 | 66 |
| Oakville Blades | 49 | 24 | 23 | 2 | 219 | 193 | 51 |
| Mississauga Derbys | 49 | 19 | 29 | 1 | 230 | 261 | 40 |
| Georgetown Raiders | 49 | 10 | 38 | 1 | 190 | 317 | 22 |
| Royal York Rangers | 49 | 6 | 42 | 1 | 152 | 347 | 17 |

== 1992-93 CJAHL Playoffs ==
Division Quarter-final

Burlington Cougars defeated Georgetown Raiders 3-games-to-none
Milton Merchants defeated Mississauga Derbys 3-games-to-none
Caledon Canadians defeated Oakville Blades 3-games-to-1
Markham Waxers defeated Ajax Axemen 3-games-to-1
Peterborough Jr. Petes defeated Lindsay Bears 3-games-to-2
Orillia Terriers defeated Newmarket 87's 3-games-to-2

Division Semi-final

Brampton Capitals defeated Caledon Canadians 4-games-to-1
Milton Merchants defeated Burlington Cougars 4-games-to-1
Barrie Colts defeated Orillia Terriers 4-games-to-1
Peterborough Jr. Petes defeated Markham Waxers 4-games-to-none

Division Final

Brampton Capitals defeated Milton Merchants 4-games-to-2
Barrie Colts defeated Peterborough Jr. Petes 4-games-to-1

Final

Barrie Colts defeated Brampton Capitals 4-games-to-none

== OHA Sutherland Cup Junior B Championship ==
Semi-final

Barrie Colts defeated Hamilton Kilty B's (GHJHL) 4-games-to-none

Barrie 7 - Hamilton 2
Barrie 8 - Hamilton 3
Barrie 6 - Hamilton 5 2OT
Barrie 9 - Hamilton 5

Final

Barrie Colts defeated Kitchener Dutchmen (MWJHL) 4-games-to-none

Barrie 5 - Kitchener 2
Barrie 5 - Kitchener 3
Barrie 8 - Kitchener 5
Barrie 7 - Kitchener 3

== Exhibition Series vs. MetJHL ==
The Barrie Colts of the Central League and the Wexford Raiders of the Metro Junior A Hockey League. Played a pair of exhibition games head-to-head for charity. The purpose of the games was to match the probably champions of the two leagues head-to-head to see where each league's talent level stood if the OHA was to allow both leagues in as sanctioned Junior A leagues for the 1993–94 season. Wexford won both games by narrow margins, but the second game was marred by an incident involving a fight, initiated by the Barrie Colts, that spilled into the crowd.

Wexford Raiders (MetJHL) defeated Barrie Colts 7-6
Wexford Raiders (MetJHL) defeated Barrie Colts 4-3

== See also ==
- Sutherland Cup
- List of OJHL seasons
- Western Ontario Hockey League
- Mid-Western Junior Hockey League
- Golden Horseshoe Junior Hockey League

| Preceded by 1991–92 CJBHL season | OJHL seasons | Succeeded by 1993–94 OPJHL season |
