= 2007–08 OPJHL season =

- League: Ontario Provincial Junior A Hockey League
- Sport: Hockey
- Duration: Regular season 2007-09-07 – 2008-02-13; Playoffs; 2008-02-14 – 2008-04-13
- Teams: 35
- Finals champions: Oakville Blades

OPJHL seasons
- 2006–07 2008–09

The 2007–08 OPJHL season is the 15th season of the Ontario Provincial Junior A Hockey League (OPJHL). The thirty-five teams of the North, South, East, and West divisions will compete in a 49-game schedule.

Come February, the top six teams of each division competed for the Frank L. Buckland Trophy, the OJHL championship. The winner of the Buckland Cup, the Oakville Blades, competed in the Central Canadian Junior "A" championship, the Dudley Hewitt Cup, and won. Once successful against the winners of the Northern Ontario Junior Hockey League and Superior International Junior Hockey League, the champion Blades then moved on to play in the Canadian Junior A Hockey League championship, the 2008 Royal Bank Cup where they finished last.

== Changes ==
- Couchiching Terriers are back for 2007-08
- Streetsville Derbys have moved to Rexdale
- Oswego Admirals are now Toronto Dixie Beehives
- Trenton Sting are now Quinte West Pack
- Toronto Thunderbirds are now Villanova Knights
- Bancroft Hawks are folding for 2007-08 season
- Bramalea Blues are folding for 2007-08 season

== Final standings ==
as of February 13, 2008

Note: GP = Games played; W = Wins; L = Losses; OTL = Overtime losses; SL = Shootout losses; GF = Goals for; GA = Goals against; PTS = Points; x = clinched playoff berth; y = clinched division title; z = clinched conference title

East Division
| Team | Centre | 2007-08 Record | GF–GA | Points |
|---|---|---|---|---|
| zx-Wellington Dukes | Wellington | 34-11-0-4 | 202-113 | 72 |
| zx-Kingston Voyageurs | Kingston | 33-13-0-3 | 188-146 | 69 |
| x-Port Hope Predators | Port Hope | 30-13-0-6 | 198-156 | 66 |
| x-Peterborough Stars | Peterborough | 29-13-0-7 | 161-133 | 65 |
| x-Bowmanville Eagles | Bowmanville | 21-18-0-10 | 135-145 | 52 |
| x-Lindsay Muskies | Lindsay | 20-23-0-6 | 144-165 | 46 |
| y-Trenton Hercs | Trenton | 17-30-0-2 | 135-205 | 36 |
| y-Cobourg Cougars | Cobourg | 12-36-0-1 | 142-238 | 25 |
North Division
| Team | Centre | 2007-08 Record | GF–GA | Points |
| zx-Huntsville Otters | Huntsville | 42-7-0-0 | 218-92 | 84 |
| zx-Newmarket Hurricanes | Newmarket | 41-6-0-2 | 236-112 | 84 |
| x-Aurora Tigers | Aurora | 33-12-0-4 | 250-138 | 70 |
| x-Stouffville Spirit | Stouffville | 31-13-0-5 | 245-166 | 67 |
| x-Couchiching Terriers | Rama | 29-15-0-5 | 214-159 | 63 |
| x-Orangeville Crushers | Orangeville | 17-29-0-3 | 138-197 | 37 |
| y-Seguin Bruins | Humphrey | 11-36-0-2 | 154-292 | 24 |
| y-Collingwood Blues | Collingwood | 10-36-0-3 | 107-220 | 23 |
| y-Villanova Knights | Toronto | 6-42-0-1 | 124-311 | 13 |
South Division
| Team | Centre | 2007-08 Record | GF–GA | Points |
| zx-St. Michael's Buzzers | Toronto | 43-4-0-2 | 291-124 | 88 |
| zx-Vaughan Vipers | Vaughan | 41-4-0-4 | 256-127 | 86 |
| x-Markham Waxers | Markham | 36-11-0-2 | 259-168 | 74 |
| x-Toronto Jr. Canadiens | Toronto | 29-18-0-2 | 223-175 | 60 |
| x-North York Rangers | Toronto | 20-27-0-2 | 169-186 | 42 |
| x-Toronto Dixie Beehives | Toronto | 17-27-0-5 | 175-248 | 39 |
| y-Durham Fury | Oshawa | 13-31-0-5 | 171-267 | 31 |
| y-Ajax Attack | Ajax | 12-34-0-3 | 142-268 | 27 |
| y-Pickering Panthers | Pickering | 10-38-0-1 | 135-260 | 21 |
West Division
| Team | Centre | 2007-08 Record | GF–GA | Points |
| zx-Oakville Blades | Oakville | 39-6-0-4 | 222-139 | 82 |
| zx-Georgetown Raiders | Georgetown | 30-14-0-5 | 202-164 | 65 |
| x-Hamilton Red Wings | Hamilton | 31-16-0-2 | 255-183 | 64 |
| x-Brampton Capitals | Brampton | 30-16-0-3 | 213-176 | 63 |
| x-Burlington Cougars | Burlington | 24-20-0-5 | 230-188 | 53 |
| x-Milton Icehawks | Milton | 22-20-0-7 | 185-194 | 51 |
| y-Mississauga Chargers | Mississauga | 22-23-0-4 | 213-245 | 48 |
| y-Buffalo Jr. Sabres | Buffalo | 15-30-0-4 | 151-223 | 34 |
| y-Streetsville Derbys | Toronto | 8-40-0-1 | 122-281 | 17 |

Please note: (x-) denotes playoff berth, (y-) denotes elimination, (zx-) denotes first round bye.

Teams listed on the official league website .

Standings listed by Pointstreak on official league website .

== 2007-08 Frank L. Buckland Trophy Playoffs ==
Division Quarter-finals
E4 | Peterborough | 0
E5 | Bowmanville | 3
E3 | Port Hope | 3
E6 | Lindsay | 1
S4 | Toronto | 3
S5 | North York | 2
S3 | Markham | 3
S6 | Dixie | 0
W3 | Hamilton | 2
W6 | Milton | 3
W4 | Brampton | 3
W5 | Burlington | 0
N4 | Stouffville | 3
N5 | Couchiching | 0
N3 | Aurora | 3
N6 | Orangeville | 0

Division Semi-finals
E1 | Wellington | 4
E5 | Bowmanville | 0
East
E2 | Kingston | 4
E3 | Port Hope | 1
S1 | St. Michael's | 4
S4 | Toronto | 2
South
S2 | Vaughan | 0
S3 | Markham | 4
W1 | Oakville | 4
W6 | Milton | 1
West
W2 | Georgetown | 4
W4 | Brampton | 1
N1 | Huntsville | 3
N4 | Stouffville | 4
North
N2 | Newmarket | 1
N3 | Aurora | 4

Division Finals
E1 | Wellington | 4
E2 | Kingston | 0
S1 | St. Michael's | 2
S3 | Markham | 4
W1 | Oakville | 4
W2 | Georgetown | 1
N4 | Stouffville | 1
N3 | Aurora | 4

Conference Final
E1 | Wellington | 1
S3 | Markham | 4
W1 | Oakville | 4
N3 | Aurora | 2

Buckland Cup Series
S3 | Markham Waxers | 1
W1 | Oakville Blades | 4

Note: E is East, S is South, W is West, N is North, WC is Wild Card.

Playoff results are listed by Pointstreak on the official league website .

== Dudley Hewitt Cup Championship ==
Hosted by the Newmarket Hurricanes in Newmarket, Ontario. Oakville finished first, Newmarket finished second.

Round Robin

Oakville Blades 5 - Dryden Ice Dogs 1
Newmarket Hurricanes 5 - Sudbury Jr. Wolves 1
Oakville Blades 5 - Sudbury Jr. Wolves 3
Newmarket Hurricanes 7 - Dryden Ice Dogs 1
Oakville Blades 5 - Newmarket Hurricanes 2

Semi-final

Newmarket Hurricanes 2 - Dryden Ice Dogs 1 OT

Final

Oakville Blades 6 - Newmarket Hurricanes 3

== 2008 Royal Bank Cup Championship ==
Hosted by Cornwall Colts in Cornwall, Ontario. Oakville finished fifth.

Round Robin

Cornwall Colts 5 - Oakville Blades 4
Weeks Crushers 4 - Oakville Blades 3 OT
Oakville Blades 7 - Humboldt Broncos 6
Camrose Kodiaks 6 - Oakville Blades 1

== Scoring leaders ==
Note: GP = Games played; G = Goals; A = Assists; Pts = Points; PIM = Penalty minutes

| Player | Team | GP | G | A | Pts | PIM |
|---|---|---|---|---|---|---|
| Bruce Crawford | Mississauga Chargers | 46 | 41 | 57 | 98 | 87 |
| Paul Rodrigues | Vaughan Vipers | 49 | 37 | 61 | 98 | 82 |
| Fred Cassiani | St. Michael's Buzzers | 49 | 32 | 57 | 89 | 36 |
| David Vallorani | Milton Icehawks | 49 | 32 | 55 | 87 | 42 |
| Spencer Abbott | Hamilton Red Wings | 48 | 42 | 41 | 83 | 42 |
| Adam Shirley | Vaughan Vipers | 49 | 35 | 47 | 82 | 127 |
| Marc Hagel | Hamilton Red Wings | 49 | 24 | 58 | 82 | 67 |
| Richard Ryan | St. Michael's Buzzers | 48 | 28 | 53 | 81 | 16 |
| Rick Acorn | Couchiching Terriers | 47 | 31 | 49 | 80 | 66 |
| Adam Bevilacqua | Mississauga Chargers | 49 | 28 | 51 | 79 | 46 |

== Leading goaltenders ==
Note: GP = Games played; Mins = Minutes played; W = Wins; L = Losses: OTL = Overtime losses; SL = Shootout losses; GA = Goals Allowed; SO = Shutouts; GAA = Goals against average

| Player | Team | GP | Mins | W | L | OTL | SOL | GA | SO | Sv% | GAA |
|---|---|---|---|---|---|---|---|---|---|---|---|
| Jeff Dawson | Huntsville Otters | 39 | 2247:27 | 31 | 6 | 0 | 0 | 79 | 5 | .928 | 2.11 |
| Paul Karpowich | Wellington Dukes | 22 | 1201:35 | 15 | 3 | 2 | 0 | 43 | 3 | .922 | 2.15 |
| Zac Fryia | Peterborough Stars | 25 | 1353:18 | 14 | 4 | 0 | 4 | 49 | 1 | .921 | 2.17 |
| Jake Ficsher | Wellington Dukes | 29 | 1699:21 | 19 | 7 | 1 | 1 | 62 | 2 | .920 | 2.19 |
| Scott Greenham | Oakville Blades | 35 | 2071:39 | 27 | 3 | 1 | 2 | 80 | 3 | .923 | 2.32 |

== Players selected in 2008 NHL entry draft ==
- Rd 2 #36 Corey Trivino - New York Islanders (Stouffville Spirit)
- Rd 2 #52 Brandon Burlon - New Jersey Devils (St. Michael's Buzzers)
- Rd 6 #179 Braden Birch - Chicago Blackhawks (Oakville Blades)
- Rd 7 #185 Paul Karpowich - St. Louis Blues (Wellington Dukes)
- Rd 7 #210 Nicholas D'Agostino - Pittsburgh Penguins (St. Michael's Buzzers)

== See also ==
- 2008 Royal Bank Cup
- Dudley Hewitt Cup
- List of OJHL seasons
- Northern Ontario Junior Hockey League
- Superior International Junior Hockey League
- Greater Ontario Junior Hockey League
- 2007 in ice hockey
- 2008 in ice hockey

| Preceded by 2006–07 OPJHL season | OJHL seasons | Succeeded by 2008–09 OJHL season |
