= 2002–03 OPJHL season =

- League: Ontario Provincial Junior A Hockey League
- Sport: Hockey
- Duration: Regular season 2002-09 – 2003-02; Playoffs; 2003-02 – 2003-04
- Teams: 35
- Finals champions: Wellington Dukes

OPJHL seasons
- 2001–02 2003–04

The 2002–03 OPJHL season is the tenth season of the Ontario Provincial Junior A Hockey League (OPJHL). The thirty-five teams of the North, South, East, and West divisions competed in a 49-game schedule.

Come February, the top eight teams of each division competed for the Frank L. Buckland Trophy, the OPJHL championship. The winner of the Buckland Cup, the Wellington Dukes, went on to win the Dudley Hewitt Cup as Central Canadian Champions. The Dukes were not successful in winning the 2003 Royal Bank Cup.

== Changes ==
- Parry Sound Shamrocks leave the OPJHL.

== Final standings ==
Note: GP = Games played; W = Wins; L = Losses; OTL = Overtime losses; SL = Shootout losses; GF = Goals for; GA = Goals against; PTS = Points; x = clinched playoff berth; y = clinched division title; z = clinched conference title

East Division
Team	GP	W	L	T	OTL	GF	GA	P
Wellington Dukes	49	47	1	1	0	298	87	95
Trenton Sting	49	32	14	2	1	235	144	67
Kingston Voyageurs	49	31	13	4	1	206	132	67
Cobourg Cougars	49	27	18	3	1	187	148	58
Lindsay Muskies	49	26	17	3	3	216	174	58
Bancroft Hawks	49	21	22	3	3	206	254	48
Bowmanville Eagles	49	19	24	5	1	163	178	44
Peterborough Bees	49	15	31	1	2	133	212	33
Port Hope Predators	49	10	36	1	2	119	251	23
Syracuse Jr. Crunch	49	4	43	1	1	114	308	10
North Division
Team	GP	W	L	T	OTL	GF	GA	P
Aurora Tigers	49	43	3	2	1	265	103	89
Newmarket Hurricanes	49	31	14	1	3	221	163	66
Stouffville Spirit	49	29	18	2	0	241	154	60
Collingwood Blues	49	23	25	0	1	204	176	47
Couchiching Terriers	49	21	23	4	1	178	184	47
Huntsville Wildcats	49	2	46	0	1	121	406	5
South Division
Team	GP	W	L	T	OTL	GF	GA	P
Wexford Raiders	49	32	12	2	3	231	152	69
Markham Waxers	49	30	12	6	1	239	173	67
St. Michael's Buzzers	49	25	15	6	3	209	174	59
Vaughan Vipers	49	26	17	2	4	205	204	58
North York Rangers	49	23	18	3	5	180	182	54
Oshawa Legionaires	49	24	21	3	1	189	184	52
Pickering Panthers	49	13	31	3	2	154	218	31
Ajax Axemen	49	12	31	3	3	142	202	30
Thornhill Rattlers	49	11	34	3	1	129	240	26
West Division
Team	GP	W	L	T	OTL	GF	GA	P
Milton Merchants	49	41	6	1	1	279	139	84
Georgetown Raiders	49	37	7	3	2	280	155	79
Hamilton Kiltys	49	38	8	2	1	286	157	79
Burlington Cougars	49	29	17	2	1	227	201	61
Oakville Blades	49	27	20	2	0	219	197	56
Mississauga Chargers	49	24	19	3	3	189	203	54
Buffalo Lightning	49	12	32	1	4	167	229	29
Streetsville Derbys	49	10	30	3	6	172	293	29
Bramalea Blues	49	10	35	3	1	168	282	24
Brampton Capitals	49	10	36	2	1	208	320	23

== 2002-03 Frank L. Buckland Trophy Playoffs ==
Division Quarter-final

Wellington Dukes defeated Peterborough Bees 4-games-to-none
Trenton Sting defeated Bowmanville Eagles 4-games-to-1
Kingston Voyageurs defeated Bancroft Hawks 4-games-to-none
Lindsay Muskies defeated Cobourg Cougars 4-games-to-3
Aurora Tigers defeated Bramalea Blues 4-games-to-none
Newmarket Hurricanes defeated Ajax Axemen 4-games-to-1
Stouffville Spirit defeated Couchiching Terriers 4-games-to-none
Collingwood Blues defeated North York Rangers 4-games-to-2
Milton Merchants defeated Streetsville Derbys 4-games-to-none
Buffalo Lightning defeated Hamilton Kiltys 4-games-to-2
Georgetown Raiders defeated Mississauga Chargers 4-games-to-1
Oakville Blades defeated Burlington Cougars 4-games-to-none
Wexford Raiders defeated Port Hope Predators 4-games-to-1
Markham Waxers defeated Thornhill Rattlers 4-games-to-none
St. Michael's Buzzers defeated Pickering Panthers 4-games-to-none
Oshawa Legionaires defeated Vaughan Vipers 4-games-to-2

Division Semi-final

Wexford Raiders defeated Oshawa Legionaires 4-games-to-2
Markham Waxers defeated St. Michael's Buzzers 4-games-to-2
Wellington Dukes defeated Lindsay Muskies 4-games-to-1
Trenton Sting defeated Kingston Voyageurs 4-games-to-2
Milton Merchants defeated Buffalo Lightning 4-games-to-none
Georgetown Raiders defeated Oakville Blades 4-games-to-3
Aurora Tigers defeated Collingwood Blues 4-games-to-1
Stouffville Spirit defeated Newmarket Hurricanes 4-games-to-3

Division Final

Georgetown Raiders defeated Milton Merchants 4-games-to-3
Aurora Tigers defeated Stouffville Spirit 4-games-to-2
Markham Waxers defeated Wexford Raiders 4-games-to-3
Wellington Dukes defeated Trenton Sting 4-games-to-3

Semi-final

Aurora Tigers defeated Georgetown Raiders 4-games-to-1
Wellington Dukes defeated Markham Waxers 4-games-to-none

Final

Wellington Dukes defeated Aurora Tigers 4-games-to-2

== Dudley Hewitt Cup Championship ==
Hosted by Fort Frances Borderland Thunder in Fort Frances, Ontario. Wellington Dukes won the event.

Round Robin

Wellington Dukes defeated Thunder Bay Bulldogs (SIJHL) 7-4
Wellington Dukes defeated Fort Frances Borderland Thunder (SIJHL) 7-1
North Bay Skyhawks (NOJHL) defeated Wellington Dukes 2-1

Semi-final

Wellington Dukes defeated Fort Frances Borderland Thunder (SIJHL) 3-2

Final

Wellington Dukes defeated North Bay Skyhawks (NOJHL) 4-0

== 2003 Royal Bank Cup Championship ==
Hosted by Charlottetown Abbies in Charlottetown, Prince Edward Island. The Wellington Dukes lost in the semi-final.

Round Robin

Humboldt Broncos (SJHL) defeated Wellington Dukes 4-1
Camrose Kodiaks (AJHL) defeated Wellington Dukes 7-1
Wellington Dukes defeated Charlottetown Abbies (MJAHL) 1-0 OT
Wellington Dukes defeated Lennoxville Cougars (QJAAAHL) 5-2

Semi-final

Humboldt Broncos (SJHL) defeated Wellington Dukes 3-2

== Scoring leaders ==
Note: GP = Games played; G = Goals; A = Assists; Pts = Points; PIM = Penalty minutes

Player	Team	GP	G	A	Pts
Josh Soares	Hamilton Kiltys	48	56	68	124
Brad Efthimiou	Milton/Brampton	48	44	70	114
Rich Meloche	Milton Merchants	49	49	56	105
Luchiano Aquino	Wexford Raiders	48	48	54	102

== Players selected in 2003 NHL entry draft ==
- Rd 4 #103 Kevin Jarman - Columbus Blue Jackets (Stouffville Spirit)
- Rd 8 #244 Mike Sullivan - Los Angeles Kings (Stouffville Spirit)
- Rd 9 #270 Kevin Harvey - Calgary Flames (Georgetown Raiders)
- Rd 9 #291 Brian Elliott - Ottawa Senators (Ajax Axemen)

== See also ==
- 2003 Royal Bank Cup
- Dudley Hewitt Cup
- List of OJHL seasons
- Northern Ontario Junior Hockey League
- Superior International Junior Hockey League
- Greater Ontario Junior Hockey League
- 2002 in ice hockey
- 2003 in ice hockey

Preceded by 2001–02 OPJHL season	OJHL seasons	Succeeded by 2003–04 OPJHL season
