= 2003–04 OPJHL season =

- League: Ontario Provincial Junior A Hockey League
- Sport: Hockey
- Duration: Regular season 2003-09 – 2004-02; Playoffs; 2004-02 – 2004-04
- Teams: 35
- Finals champions: Aurora Tigers

OPJHL seasons
- 2002–03 2004–05

The 2003–04 OPJHL season is the 11th season of the Ontario Provincial Junior A Hockey League (OPJHL). The thirty-five teams of the North, South, East, and West divisions competed in a 49-game schedule.

Come February, the top eight teams of each division competed for the Frank L. Buckland Trophy, the OPJHL championship. The winner of the Buckland Cup, the Aurora Tigers, went on to win both the Dudley Hewitt Cup as Central Canadian Champions and the 2004 Royal Bank Cup as National Champions.

== Changes ==
- Huntsville Wildcats fold mid-season.
- Peterborough Bees change name to Peterborough Stars.
- Milton Merchants change name to Milton Icehawks.
- Hamilton Kiltys change name to Hamilton Red Wings

== Final standings ==
Note: GP = Games played; W = Wins; L = Losses; OTL = Overtime losses; SL = Shootout losses; GF = Goals for; GA = Goals against; PTS = Points; x = clinched playoff berth; y = clinched division title; z = clinched conference title

East Division
Team	GP	W	L	T	OTL	GF	GA	P
Wellington Dukes	49	37	5	3	4	253	134	81
Bowmanville Eagles	49	31	10	4	4	218	147	70
Cobourg Cougars	49	24	19	4	2	183	190	54
Kingston Voyageurs	49	20	18	8	3	171	166	51
Trenton Sting	49	22	21	1	5	192	190	50
Bancroft Hawks	49	21	24	2	2	194	230	46
Syracuse Jr. Crunch	49	20	26	0	3	192	223	43
Peterborough Stars	49	19	27	3	0	158	222	41
Port Hope Predators	49	18	26	2	3	188	197	41
Lindsay Muskies	49	16	24	5	4	159	209	41
North Division
Team	GP	W	L	T	OTL	GF	GA	P
Aurora Tigers	49	47	2	0	0	290	79	94
Newmarket Hurricanes	49	34	13	2	0	202	122	70
Stouffville Spirit	49	27	21	1	0	201	178	55
Collingwood Blues	49	22	20	3	4	174	216	51
Couchiching Terriers	49	18	24	5	2	181	191	43
Huntsville Wildcats	23	0	23	0	0	42	209	0
South Division
Team	GP	W	L	T	OTL	GF	GA	P
St. Michael's Buzzers	49	33	13	1	2	249	163	69
Wexford Raiders	49	29	15	3	2	202	162	63
North York Rangers	49	29	17	2	1	211	145	61
Markham Waxers	49	24	17	3	5	219	207	56
Oshawa Legionaires	49	24	21	4	0	164	214	52
Thornhill Rattlers	49	18	26	4	1	184	219	41
Vaughan Vipers	49	18	29	1	1	161	200	38
Pickering Panthers	49	12	30	7	0	168	221	31
Ajax Axemen	49	13	32	2	2	154	250	30
West Division
Team	GP	W	L	T	OTL	GF	GA	P
Georgetown Raiders	49	40	5	3	1	296	132	84
Hamilton Red Wings	49	33	13	1	2	254	161	69
Oakville Blades	49	32	13	3	1	207	143	68
Milton Icehawks	49	32	15	0	2	228	161	66
Mississauga Chargers	49	25	21	0	3	214	225	53
Burlington Cougars	49	18	26	4	1	151	205	41
Streetsville Derbys	49	16	25	6	2	148	187	40
Bramalea Blues	49	14	30	2	3	137	223	33
Buffalo Lightning	49	12	31	4	2	137	239	30
Brampton Capitals	49	13	33	1	2	154	246	29

== 2003-04 Frank L. Buckland Trophy Playoffs ==
1st Round
E1	Aurora	4
E15	Lindsay	0
17
16
9
24
25
8
5
28
21
12
13
20
29
4
3
30
19
14
11
22
27
6
7
26
23
10
15
18
31
2

2nd Round

Quarterfinals

Semifinals

Finals

Divisional Quarter-final

Wellington Dukes defeated Peterborough Stars 4-games-to-1
Bowmanville Eagles defeated Syracuse Jr. Crunch 4-games-to-none
Cobourg Cougars defeated Bancroft Hawks 4-games-to-3
Kingston Voyageurs defeated Trenton Sting 4-games-to-1
Aurora Tigers defeated Lindsay Muskies 4-games-to-none
Newmarket Hurricanes defeated Pickering Panthers 4-games-to-none
Stouffville Spirit defeated Thornhill Rattlers 4-games-to-2
Collingwood Blues defeated Oshawa Legionaires 4-games-to-none
Georgetown Raiders defeated Bramalea Blues 4-games-to-none
Hamilton Red Wings defeated Streetsville Derbys 4-games-to-none
Oakville Blades defeated Burlington Cougars 4-games-to-none
Milton Icehawks defeated Mississauga Chargers 4-games-to-1
St. Michael's Buzzers defeated Buffalo Lightning 4-games-to-none
Wexford Raiders defeated Ajax Axemen 4-games-to-none
North York Rangers defeated Vaughan Vipers 4-games-to-none
Markham Waxers defeated Couchiching Terriers 4-games-to-none

Divisional Semi-final

Wellington Dukes defeated Kingston Voyageurs 4-games-to-3
Bowmanville Eagles defeated Cobourg Cougars 4-games-to-none
Aurora Tigers defeated Collingwood Blues 4-games-to-none
Newmarket Hurricanes defeated Stouffville Spirit 4-games-to-1
Georgetown Raiders defeated Milton Icehawks 4-games-to-none
Oakville Blades defeated Hamilton Red Wings 4-games to-2
St. Michael's Buzzers defeated Markham Waxers 4-games-to-none
North York Rangers defeated Wexford Raiders 4-games-to-2

Divisional Final

Bowmanville Eagles defeated Wellington Dukes 4-games-to-3
Aurora Tigers defeated Newmarket Hurricanes 4-games-to-none
Oakville Blades defeated Georgetown Raiders 4-games-to-1
St. Michael's Buzzers defeated North York Rangers 4-games-to-1

Semi-final

St. Michael's Buzzers defeated Bowmanville Eagles 4-games-to-2
Aurora Tigers defeated Oakville Blades 4-games-to-2

Final

Aurora Tigers defeated St. Michael's Buzzers 4-games-to-2

== Dudley Hewitt Cup Championship ==
Hosted by North Bay Skyhawks in North Bay, Ontario. Aurora Tigers won the event.

Round Robin

Aurora Tigers defeated Soo Thunderbirds (NOJHL) 3-1
Aurora Tigers defeated Fort William North Stars (SIJHL) 4-0
Aurora Tigers defeated North Bay Skyhawks (NOJHL) 5-1

Final

Aurora Tigers defeated North Bay Skyhawks (NOJHL) 5-1

== 2004 Royal Bank Cup Championship ==
Hosted by Grande Prairie Storm in Grande Prairie, Alberta. Aurora Tigers won the event.

Round Robin

Grande Prairie Storm (AJHL) defeated Aurora Tigers 4-2
Aurora Tigers defeated Nanaimo Clippers (BCHL) 4-2
Aurora Tigers defeated Kindersley Klippers (SJHL) 5-0
Aurora Tigers defeated Nepean Raiders (CJHL) 3-1

Semi-final

Aurora Tigers defeated Nepean Raiders (CJHL) 7-2

Final

Aurora Tigers defeated Kindersley Klippers (SJHL) 7-1

== Players selected in 2004 NHL entry draft ==
- Rd 7 #201 Michael Vernace - San Jose Sharks (Bramalea Blues)

== See also ==
- 2004 Royal Bank Cup
- Dudley Hewitt Cup
- List of OJHL seasons
- Northern Ontario Junior Hockey League
- Superior International Junior Hockey League
- Greater Ontario Junior Hockey League
- 2003 in ice hockey
- 2004 in ice hockey

Preceded by 2002–03 OPJHL season	OJHL seasons	Succeeded by 2004–05 OPJHL season
