= 2001–02 OPJHL season =

- League: Ontario Provincial Junior A Hockey League
- Sport: Hockey
- Duration: Regular season 2001-09 – 2002-02; Playoffs; 2002-02 – 2002-04
- Teams: 36
- Finals champions: Brampton Capitals

OPJHL seasons
- 2000–01 2002–03

The 2001–02 OPJHL season is the ninth season of the Ontario Provincial Junior A Hockey League (OPJHL). The thirty-six teams of the North, South, East, and West divisions competed in a 49-game schedule.

Come February, the top eight teams of each division competed for the Frank L. Buckland Trophy, the OPJHL championship. The winner of the Buckland Cup, the Brampton Capitals, did not attend the 2002 Dudley Hewitt Cup due to a protest staged by the OPJHL against the inclusion of the upstart Superior International Junior Hockey League in the Central Canadian playdowns.

== Changes ==
- OPJHL opts out of National Playdowns for one season.
- Durham Huskies leave the OPJHL.
- Port Hope Clippers are renamed Port Hope Predators.

== Final standings ==
Note: GP = Games played; W = Wins; L = Losses; OTL = Overtime losses; SL = Shootout losses; GF = Goals for; GA = Goals against; PTS = Points; x = clinched playoff berth; y = clinched division title; z = clinched conference title

East Division
Team	GP	W	L	T	OTL	GF	GA	P
Wellington Dukes	49	37	5	7	0	238	116	81
Cobourg Cougars	49	33	11	5	0	198	141	71
Trenton Sting	49	32	11	5	1	207	128	70
Kingston Voyageurs	49	25	15	6	3	185	141	59
Peterborough Bees	49	23	20	5	1	195	199	52
Syracuse Jr. Crunch	49	20	24	5	0	187	226	45
Bowmanville Eagles	49	15	23	7	4	159	174	41
Bancroft Hawks	49	16	26	5	2	184	209	39
Lindsay Muskies	49	13	33	2	1	136	211	29
Port Hope Predators	49	8	40	1	0	119	268	17
North Division
Team	GP	W	L	T	OTL	GF	GA	P
Newmarket Hurricanes	49	35	12	2	0	232	112	72
Couchiching Terriers	49	30	15	3	1	236	163	64
Aurora Tigers	49	30	15	3	1	193	150	64
Stouffville Spirit	49	24	18	5	2	207	183	55
Collingwood Blues	49	23	21	4	1	191	181	51
Parry Sound Shamrocks	49	13	28	4	4	138	206	34
Huntsville Wildcats	49	7	39	2	1	121	289	17
South Division
Team	GP	W	L	T	OTL	GF	GA	P
Wexford Raiders	49	35	8	6	0	237	151	76
St. Michael's Buzzers	49	34	10	4	1	230	145	73
Markham Waxers	49	26	17	4	2	223	213	58
Thornhill Rattlers	49	20	21	6	2	165	183	48
Pickering Panthers	49	20	22	5	2	188	193	47
North York Rangers	49	19	24	6	0	155	171	44
Vaughan Vipers	49	19	25	3	2	173	196	43
Oshawa Legionaires	49	14	25	7	3	158	226	38
Ajax Axemen	49	7	30	6	6	163	240	26
West Division
Team	GP	W	L	T	OTL	GF	GA	P
Brampton Capitals	49	34	12	3	0	247	159	71
Hamilton Kiltys	49	34	12	2	1	237	156	71
Oakville Blades	49	33	11	3	2	254	177	71
Bramalea Blues	49	25	19	4	1	224	209	55
Milton Merchants	49	25	20	3	1	198	208	54
Georgetown Raiders	49	23	20	5	1	216	201	52
Mississauga Chargers	49	18	23	4	4	174	164	44
Streetsville Derbys	49	17	29	2	1	199	252	37
Burlington Cougars	49	14	31	4	0	171	244	32
Buffalo Lightning	49	5	39	4	1	123	275	15

== 2001-02 Frank L. Buckland Trophy Playoffs ==
Division Quarter-final

Wellington Dukes defeated Bancroft Hawks 4-games-to-none
Cobourg Cougars defeated Bowmanville Eagles 4-games-to-none
Trenton Sting defeated Syracuse Jr. Crunch 4-games-to-none
Peterborough Bees defeated Kingston Voyageurs 4-games-to-1
Newmarket Hurricanes defeated Huntsville Wildcats 4-games-to-none
Aurora Tigers defeated Parry Sound Shamrocks 4-games-to-1
Couchiching Terriers defeated Vaughan Vipers 4-games-to-2
Collingwood Blues defeated Stouffville Spirit 4-games-to-3
Wexford Raiders defeated Ajax Axemen 4-games-to-1
St. Michael's Buzzers defeated Oshawa Legionaires 4-games-to-2
Markham Waxers defeated North York Rangers 4-games-to-3
Pickering Panthers defeated Thornhill Rattlers 4-games-to-3
Brampton Capitals defeated Streetsville Derbys 4-games-to-none
Hamilton Kiltys defeated Mississauga Chargers 4-games-to-none
Georgetown Raiders defeated Oakville Blades 4-games-to-none
Bramalea Blues defeated Milton Merchants 4-games-to-2

Division Semi-final

Wellington Dukes defeated Peterborough Bees 4-games-to-none
Cobourg Cougars defeated Trenton Sting 4-games-to-1
Newmarket Hurricanes defeated Collingwood Blues 4-games-to-1
Aurora Tigers defeated Couchiching Terriers 4-games-to-1
Wexford Raiders defeated Pickering Panthers 4-games-to-3
St. Michael's Buzzers defeated Markham Waxers 4-games-to-none
Brampton Capitals defeated Georgetown Raiders 4-games-to-none
Hamilton Kiltys defeated Bramalea Blues 4-games-to-2

Division Final

Brampton Capitals defeated Hamilton Kiltys 4-games-to-2
Wellington Dukes defeated Cobourg Cougars 4-games-to-none
Aurora Tigers defeated Newmarket Hurricanes 4-games-to-none
Wexford Raiders defeated St. Michael's Buzzers 4-games-to-2

Semi-final

Brampton Capitals defeated Aurora Tigers 4-games-to-none
Wellington Dukes defeated Wexford Raiders 4-games-to-3

Final

Brampton Capitals defeated Wellington Dukes 4-games-to-2

== Scoring leaders ==
Note: GP = Games played; G = Goals; A = Assists; Pts = Points; PIM = Penalty minutes

Player / Team / GP / G / A / Pts; Jeff Hristovski / Brampton Capitals / 48 / 56 / 47 / 103

== Players selected in 2002 NHL entry draft ==
- Rd 7 #211 Patrick Murphy - Edmonton Oilers (Newmarket Hurricanes)

== See also ==
- 2002 Royal Bank Cup
- Dudley Hewitt Cup
- List of OJHL seasons
- Northern Ontario Junior Hockey League
- Superior International Junior Hockey League
- Greater Ontario Junior Hockey League
- 2001 in ice hockey
- 2002 in ice hockey

Preceded by 2000–01 OPJHL season	OJHL seasons	Succeeded by 2002–03 OPJHL season
