= Seguin Bruins =

- City: Humphrey, Ontario, Canada
- League: Ontario Junior Hockey League
- Operated: 2005-2010
- Home arena: Humphrey Community Centre
- Colours: Yellow, Black, and White
- General manager: Mike Murrell
- Head coach: Mark Catron
- Affiliates: Midland Flyers (GMOHL)

The Seguin Bruins were a Junior "A" ice hockey team from the greater Parry Sound area, created in 2005. The Bruins were based in the village of Humphrey, in Seguin Township, Ontario, Canada. They were a part of the Central Canadian Hockey League.

== History ==
After the Parry Sound Shamrocks became defunct in 2002, the Bruins were created in 2005 to be the new Junior "A" ice hockey team in Parry Sound.

The Bruins were below .500 in their first season, however they were able to make the playoffs where they lost in the conference quarter final to the eventual conference champion Stouffville Spirit.

Seguin's first regular season game took place at home on September 11, 2005 against the Couchiching Terriers. The game ended up being a 6-5 loss for the Bruins. Thomas Speer was the goaltender in the Bruins' first game. The Bruins' first win came on October 2, 2005 as a 5-0 shutout against the Collingwood Blues. Jonathan Porretta picked up both the franchise's first win and shutout in net stopping all 33 shots.

In 2010 they accepted a buyout from their league to cease operations.

== Season-by-season results ==
Season	GP	W	L	T	OTL	GF	GA	P	Results	Playoffs
2005-06	49	13	26	8	2	154	185	36	6th OPJHL-N	Lost Conf. QF
2006-07	49	16	30	1	2	155	199	35	6th OPJHL-N	Lost Conf. QF
2007-08	49	11	36	-	2	154	292	24	7th OPJHL-N	
2008-09	49	16	31	-	2	185	270	34	8th OJHL-P	
2009-10	50	11	38	-	1	140	257	23	11th CCHL-W	DNQ
