= 2006–07 OPJHL season =

- League: Ontario Provincial Junior A Hockey League
- Sport: Hockey
- Duration: Regular season 2006-09-07 – 2007-02-06; Playoffs; 2007-02-08 – 2007-04-13
- Teams: 35
- Finals champions: Aurora Tigers

OPJHL seasons
- 2005–06 2007–08

The 2006–07 OPJHL season is the 14th season of the Ontario Provincial Junior A Hockey League (OPJHL). The thirty-six teams of the North, South, East, and West divisions will compete in a 49-game schedule.

Come February, the top eight teams of each division competed for the Frank L. Buckland Trophy, the OJHL championship. The winner of the Buckland Cup, the Aurora Tigers, competed in the Central Canadian Junior "A" championship, the Dudley Hewitt Cup, and won. Once successful against the winners of the Northern Ontario Junior Hockey League and Superior International Junior Hockey League, the champion Tigers then moved on to play in the Canadian Junior A Hockey League championship, the 2007 Royal Bank Cup where they became national champions.

== Changes ==
- Wexford Raiders became Toronto Jr. Canadiens
- Oshawa Legionaires became Durham Fury
- Couchiching Terriers fold for 2006-07
- Toronto Thunderbirds fold for 2006-07
- Orangeville Crushers join the OPJHL from the MWJBHL

== Final standings ==
as of February 6, 2008

Note: GP = Games played; W = Wins; L = Losses; OTL = Overtime losses; SL = Shootout losses; GF = Goals for; GA = Goals against; PTS = Points; x = clinched playoff berth; y = clinched division title; z = clinched conference title

East Division
Team	Centre	2006-07 Record	GF–GA	Points
zx-Bowmanville Eagles	Bowmanville	39-6-3-1	248-125	82
x-Wellington Dukes	Wellington	38-5-4-2	219-92	82
x-Port Hope Predators	Port Hope	31-11-5-2	209-138	69
x-Kingston Voyageurs	Kingston	26-17-3-3	195-166	58
x-Peterborough Stars	Peterborough	20-25-3-1	173-208	44
x-Oswego Admirals	Oswego	19-25-2-3	154-188	43
x-Trenton Sting	Trenton	17-26-2-4	169-213	40
x-Lindsay Muskies	Lindsay	15-27-5-2	171-218	37
wc-Cobourg Cougars	Cobourg	15-29-4-1	165-225	35
y-Bancroft Hawks	Bancroft	6-39-3-1	134-269	16
South Division
Team	Centre	2006-07 Record	GF–GA	Points
zx-Vaughan Vipers	Vaughan	32-7-7-3	192-108	74
x-St. Michael's Buzzers	Toronto	33-9-7-0	209-128	73
x-Markham Waxers	Markham	31-16-2-0	199-158	64
x-Toronto Jr. Canadiens	Toronto	26-16-5-2	202-162	59
x-Pickering Panthers	Pickering	26-21-2-0	222-189	54
x-Durham Fury	Oshawa	16-31-2-0	131-207	34
x-Ajax Attack	Ajax	13-31-3-2	144-249	31
wc-North York Rangers	Toronto	12-30-3-4	162-248	31
West Division
Team	Centre	2006-07 Record	GF–GA	Points
zx-Brampton Capitals	Brampton	39-7-1-2	282-142	81
x-Oakville Blades	Oakville	38-9-1-1	269-125	78
x-Hamilton Red Wings	Hamilton	37-8-2-2	270-129	78
x-Georgetown Raiders	Georgetown	31-12-3-3	250-180	68
x-Burlington Cougars	Burlington	30-12-4-3	259-158	67
x-Streetsville Derbys	Streetsville	20-24-3-2	190-226	45
x-Mississauga Chargers	Mississauga	15-33-0-1	179-272	31
x-Milton Icehawks	Milton	12-31-4-2	142-235	30
wc-Buffalo Jr. Sabres	Buffalo	9-35-5-0	154-298	23
y-Bramalea Blues	Bramalea	1-45-1-2	111-360	5
North Division
Team	Centre	2006-07 Record	GF–GA	Points
zx-Aurora Tigers	Aurora	44-4-1-0	260-99	89
x-Stouffville Spirit	Stouffville	28-16-3-2	199-164	61
x-Collingwood Blues	Collingwood	22-19-4-3	157-196	51
x-Huntsville-Muskoka Otters	Huntsville	20-21-4-3	182-186	47
x-Newmarket Hurricanes	Newmarket	17-29-2-1	157-203	37
x-Seguin Bruins	Parry Sound	16-30-1-2	155-199	35
y-Orangeville Crushers	Orangeville	9-36-3-1	131-213	22

Please Note: "x-" implies clinched playoff berth, "zx-" implies clinched division, "wc-" clinched Wild Card, "y-" Eliminated from Playoffs.

Teams listed on the official league website .

Standings listed by Pointstreak on official league website .

== 2006-07 Frank L. Buckland Trophy Playoffs ==
=== Championship round ===
Semi-finals
East	Wellington Dukes	4
South	St. Michael's Buzzers	1
West	Hamilton Red Wings	1
North	Aurora Tigers	4

Buckland Trophy Finals
East	Wellington Dukes	1
North	Aurora Tigers	4

=== Divisional Playoffs ===
==== East/South ====
Division Quarter-finals	Division Semi-finals
E1	Bowmanville	4
E8	Lindsay	1
E1	Bowmanville	1
E4	Kingston	4
E4	Kingston	4
E5	Peterborough	1
East
E2	Wellington	4
E7	Trenton	0
E2	Wellington	4
E3	Port Hope	1
E3	Port Hope	3
E6	Oswego	0
S1	Vaughan	4
WC2	North York	1
S1	Vaughan	3
S5	Pickering	4
S4	Toronto	3
S5	Pickering	4
South
S2	St. Michael's	4
S7	Ajax	0
S2	St. Michael's	4
S3	Markham	3
S3	Markham	4
S6	Durham	0

Division Finals
E4	Kingston	1
E2	Wellington	4
S5	Pickering	0
S2	St. Michael's	4

Buckland Trophy Semi-final
E2	Wellington	4
S2	St. Michael's	1

==== West/North ====
Division Quarter-finals	Division Semi-finals
W1	Brampton	4
W8	Milton	1
W1	Brampton	1
W4	Georgetown	4
W4	Georgetown	4
W5	Burlington	2
West
W2	Oakville	4
W7	Mississauga	0
W2	Oakville	2
W3	Hamilton	4
W3	Hamilton	4
W6	Streetsville	0
N1	Aurora	4
WC3	Buffalo	0
N1	Aurora	4
N5	Newmarket	2
N4	Huntsville	1
N5	Newmarket	4
North
N2	Stouffville	4
WC1	Cobourg	0
N2	Stouffville	4
N3	Collingwood	0
N3	Collingwood	4
N6	Seguin	3

Division Finals
W4	Georgetown	0
W3	Hamilton	4
N1	Aurora	4
N2	Stouffville	1

Buckland Trophy Semi-final
W3	Hamilton	1
N1	Aurora	4

Note: E is East, S is South, W is West, N is North, WC is Wild Card.

Playoff results are listed by Pointstreak on the official league website .

== Dudley Hewitt Cup Championship ==
Hosted by Abitibi Eskimos in Iroquois Falls, Ontario. Aurora finished first.

Round Robin

Aurora Tigers 4 - Soo Indians 1
Aurora Tigers 6 - Schreiber Diesels 3
Aurora Tigers 7 - Abitibi Eskimos 0

Final

Aurora Tigers 10 - Schreiber Diesels 0

== 2007 Royal Bank Cup Championship ==
Hosted by Prince George Spruce Kings in Prince George, British Columbia. Aurora finished first.

Round Robin

Aurora Tigers 4 - Selkirk Steelers 2
Pembroke Lumber Kings 5 - Aurora Tigers 3
Aurora Tigers 6 - Prince George Spruce Kings 3
Aurora Tigers 7 - Camrose Kodiaks 4

Semi-final

Aurora Tigers 3 - Pembroke Lumber Kings 2 OT

Final

Aurora Tigers 3 - Prince George Spruce Kings 1

== Scoring leaders ==
Note: GP = Games played; G = Goals; A = Assists; Pts = Points; PIM = Penalty minutes

Player	Team	GP	G	A	Pts	PIM
Scott Freeman	Bowmanville Eagles	43	33	64	97	43
David Ross	Bowmanville Eagles	47	38	50	88	32
Joe Hall	Wellington Dukes	49	46	31	77	70
Steve Mullin	Hamilton Red Wings	49	28	49	77	26
David Kostuch	Markham Waxers	43	39	36	75	64
Kerry Barchan	Burlington Cougars	49	34	41	75	58
Spencer Abbott	Hamilton Red Wings	49	32	43	75	22
Aaron Chambers	Huntsville-Muskoka Otters	48	40	32	72	104
Dylan Clarke	Kingston Voyageurs	47	40	32	72	46
Matt Ferreira	Brampton Capitals	48	38	34	72	20

== Leading goaltenders ==
Note: GP = Games played; Mins = Minutes played; W = Wins; L = Losses: OTL = Overtime losses; SL = Shootout losses; GA = Goals Allowed; SO = Shutouts; GAA = Goals against average

Player	Team	GP	Mins	W	L	T	GA	SO	Sv%	GAA
Edward Pasquale	Wellington Dukes	18	1090:55	13	3	2	35	1	.927	1.92
Dan Dunn	Wellington Dukes	27	1545:52	19	4	2	50	2	.934	1.94
Tyler Gordon	Aurora Tigers	33	1949:16	27	4	1	65	3	.932	2.00
Kori Coelho	Oakville Blades	18	1079:58	15	3	0	37	2	.902	2.06
Cam Talbot	Hamilton Red Wings	28	1644:16	19	5	2	57	1	.918	2.08

== Players selected in 2007 NHL entry draft ==
- Rd 1 #27 Brendan Smith - Detroit Red Wings (St. Michael's Buzzers)
- Rd 3 #90 Louie Caporusso - Ottawa Senators (St. Michael's Buzzers)
- Rd 6 #154 Dan Dunn - Los Angeles Kings (Wellington Dukes)
- Rd 6 #159 Alain Goulet - Boston Bruins (Aurora Tigers)
- Rd 7 #208 Bryan Rufenach - Detroit Red Wings (Lindsay Muskies)

== See also ==
- 2007 Royal Bank Cup
- Dudley Hewitt Cup
- List of OJHL seasons
- Northern Ontario Junior Hockey League
- Superior International Junior Hockey League
- Greater Ontario Junior Hockey League
- 2006 in ice hockey
- 2007 in ice hockey

Preceded by 2005–06 OPJHL season	OJHL seasons	Succeeded by 2007–08 OPJHL season
