= 1994–95 OPJHL season =

- League: Ontario Provincial Junior A Hockey League
- Sport: Hockey
- Duration: Regular season 1994-09 – 1995-02; Playoffs; 1995-02 – 1995-04
- Number of teams: 17
- Finals champions: Brampton Capitals

OPJHL seasons
- ← 1993–94 1995–96 →

The 1994–95 OPJHL season is the second season of the Ontario Provincial Junior A Hockey League (OPJHL). The nine teams of the East Division competed in a 48-game schedule, while the eight teams of the West Division played a 49-game schedule. The top 8 teams of each division make the playoffs.

The winner of the OPJHL playoffs, the Brampton Capitals, won the 1996 Buckland Cup but failed to win the Dudley Hewitt Cup as Central Canadian champions.

== Changes ==
- Lindsay Bears become the Lindsay Muskies.

== Final standings ==
Note: GP = Games played; W = Wins; L = Losses; OTL = Overtime losses; SL = Shootout losses; GF = Goals for; GA = Goals against; PTS = Points; x = clinched playoff berth; y = clinched division title; z = clinched conference title

East Division
Team	GP	W	L	T	GF	GA	P
Newmarket 87's	48	35	11	2	314	183	75
Barrie Colts	48	34	8	6	285	155	74
Lindsay Muskies	48	32	11	5	257	163	69
Cobourg Cougars	48	27	15	6	286	229	62
Collingwood Blues	48	21	24	3	210	223	46
Orillia Terriers	48	18	25	5	193	243	42
Markham Waxers	48	15	30	3	231	273	36
Peterborough Jr. Petes	48	14	33	1	209	304	30
Ajax Axemen	48	4	43	1	131	343	12
West Division
Team	GP	W	L	T	GF	GA	P
Milton Merchants	49	33	14	2	287	226	69
Streetsville Derbys	49	31	16	2	243	194	65
Hamilton Kiltys	49	28	16	5	249	195	62
Burlington Cougars	49	26	19	4	267	212	57
Brampton Capitals	49	26	20	3	287	236	56
Oakville Blades	49	24	20	5	249	221	54
Royal York Rangers	49	11	33	5	183	312	29
Georgetown Raiders	49	3	44	2	166	335	8

== 1994-95 OPJHL Playoffs ==
Division Quarter-final

Newmarket 87's defeated Peterborough Jr. Petes 4-games-to-none
Barrie Colts defeated Orillia Terriers 4-games-to-none
Lindsay Muskies defeated Markham Waxers 4-games-to-none
Cobourg Cougars defeated Collingwood Blues 4-games-to-none
Milton Merchants defeated Georgetown Raiders 4-games-to-none
Streetsville Derbys defeated Royal York Rangers 4-games-to-none
Oakville Blades defeated Hamilton Kiltys 4-games-to-2
Brampton Capitals defeated Burlington Cougars 4-games-to-1

Division Semi-final

Newmarket 87's defeated Cobourg Cougars 4-games-to-none
Barrie Colts defeated Lindsay Muskies 4-games-to-2
Oakville Blades defeated Milton Merchants 4-games-to-3
Brampton Capitals defeated Streetsville Derbys 4-games-to-none

Division Final

Barrie Colts defeated Newmarket 87's 4-games-to-3
Brampton Capitals defeated Oakville Blades 4-games-to-none

Final

Brampton Capitals defeated Barrie Colts 4-games-to-none

== OHA Buckland Cup and Dudley Hewitt Cup Championship ==
The 1995 Dudley Hewitt Cup was hosted by the Thunder Bay Flyers of Thunder Bay, Ontario. The Brampton Capitals lost in the final.

Round Robin

Brampton Capitals defeated Caledon Canadians (MetJHL) 4-1
Brampton Capitals defeated Timmins Golden Bears (NOJHL) 5-3
Brampton Capitals defeated Thunder Bay Flyers (USHL) 5-2

Final

Thunder Bay Flyers (USHL) defeated Brampton Capitals 6-4

== Scoring leaders ==
Note: GP = Games played; G = Goals; A = Assists; Pts = Points; PIM = Penalty minutes

Player	Team	GP	G	A	Pts
Jamie Janjevich	Milton Merchants	48	33	94	127
Brian Morrison	Newmarket 87's	48	53	71	124
Phil Miaskowski	Brampton Capitals	46	57	61	118
Luigi Calce	Burlington Cougars	49	47	68	115
Ron Watts	Brampton Capitals	46	51	53	104
Dave Aussem	Burlington Cougars	42	46	57	103

== See also ==
- 1995 Centennial Cup
- Dudley Hewitt Cup
- List of OJHL seasons
- Northern Ontario Junior Hockey League
- Superior International Junior Hockey League
- Greater Ontario Junior Hockey League
- 1994 in ice hockey
- 1995 in ice hockey

Preceded by 1993–94 OPJHL season	OJHL seasons	Succeeded by 1995–96 OPJHL season
