= 2004–05 OPJHL season =

- League: Ontario Provincial Junior A Hockey League
- Sport: Hockey
- Duration: Regular season 2004-09 – 2005-02; Playoffs; 2005-02 – 2005-04
- Teams: 35
- Finals champions: St. Michael's Buzzers

OPJHL seasons
- 2003–04 2005–06

The 2004–05 OPJHL season is the 12th season of the Ontario Provincial Junior A Hockey League (OPJHL). The thirty-five teams of the North, South, East, and West divisions competed in a 49-game schedule.

Come February, the top eight teams of each division competed for the Frank L. Buckland Trophy, the OJHL championship. The winner of the Buckland Cup, the St. Michael's Buzzers, competed in the Central Canadian Junior "A" championship, the Dudley Hewitt Cup, and finished 2nd. The DHC was hosted and won by the Georgetown Raiders who moved to the 2005 Royal Bank Cup but lost in the semi-final.

== Changes ==
- Huntsville Wildcats are reformed and changed their name to Huntsville-Muskoka Otters.
- Thornhill Rattlers change name to Thornhill Thunderbirds.

== Final standings ==
Note: GP = Games played; W = Wins; L = Losses; OTL = Overtime losses; SL = Shootout losses; GF = Goals for; GA = Goals against; PTS = Points; x = clinched playoff berth; y = clinched division title; z = clinched conference title

East Division
Team	GP	W	L	T	OTL	GF	GA	P
Port Hope Predators	49	38	5	3	3	226	113	82
Wellington Dukes	49	35	11	2	1	222	148	73
Bowmanville Eagles	49	34	12	3	0	159	97	71
Cobourg Cougars	49	30	14	2	3	196	131	65
Kingston Voyageurs	49	23	19	4	3	149	163	53
Trenton Sting	49	23	20	4	2	184	151	52
Peterborough Stars	49	16	28	3	2	161	215	37
Lindsay Muskies	49	15	27	2	5	130	172	37
Syracuse Jr. Crunch	49	8	35	3	3	158	267	22
Bancroft Hawks	49	8	36	2	3	133	261	21
North Division
Team	GP	W	L	T	OTL	GF	GA	P
Aurora Tigers	49	33	13	2	1	222	136	69
Newmarket Hurricanes	49	33	15	0	1	207	163	67
Stouffville Spirit	49	25	20	3	1	195	157	54
Huntsville-Muskoka Otters	49	23	23	2	1	177	207	49
Collingwood Blues	49	13	32	4	0	158	217	30
Couchiching Terriers	49	12	32	3	2	146	224	29
South Division
Team	GP	W	L	T	OTL	GF	GA	P
Wexford Raiders	49	37	5	5	2	216	104	81
St. Michael's Buzzers	49	36	7	4	2	259	128	78
North York Rangers	49	30	14	5	0	223	168	65
Markham Waxers	49	30	16	3	0	213	160	63
Pickering Panthers	49	29	15	2	3	218	171	63
Vaughan Vipers	49	20	21	4	4	157	177	48
Thornhill Thunderbirds	49	16	30	1	2	143	207	35
Oshawa Legionaires	49	8	37	1	3	111	264	20
Ajax Axemen	49	2	44	1	2	111	285	7
West Division
Team	GP	W	L	T	OTL	GF	GA	P
Georgetown Raiders	49	41	7	0	1	282	120	83
Oakville Blades	49	40	6	1	2	283	110	83
Hamilton Red Wings	49	31	13	2	3	194	149	67
Milton Icehawks	49	30	17	1	1	241	131	62
Burlington Cougars	49	26	17	1	5	202	169	58
Brampton Capitals	49	24	20	4	1	206	164	53
Buffalo Lightning	49	18	27	3	1	163	232	40
Mississauga Chargers	49	14	32	2	1	197	260	31
Streetsville Derbys	49	11	34	2	2	142	272	26
Bramalea Blues	49	4	44	0	1	97	381	9

Teams listed on the official league website.

Standings listed by Pointstreak on official league website.

== 2004-05 Frank L. Buckland Trophy Playoffs ==
Divisional Quarter-final

Port Hope Predators defeated Lindsay Muskies 4-games-to-none
Wellington Dukes defeated Peterborough Stars 4-games-to-none
Trenton Sting defeated Bowmanville Eagles 4-games-to-2
Kingston Voyageurs defeated Cobourg Cougars 4-games-to-none
Aurora Tigers defeated Syracuse Jr. Crunch 4-games-to-1
Newmarket Hurricanes defeated Streetsville Derbys 4-games-to-none
Stouffville Spirit defeated Couchiching Terriers 4-games-to-2
Huntsville-Muskoka Otters defeated Collingwood Blues 4-games-to-1
Georgetown Raiders defeated Mississauga Chargers 4-games-to-none
Oakville Blades defeated Buffalo Jr. Sabres 4-games-to-none
Hamilton Red Wings defeated Brampton Capitals 4-games-to-3
Milton Icehawks defeated Burlington Cougars 4-games-to-1
Wexford Raiders defeated Oshawa Legionaires 4-games-to-none
St. Michael's Buzzers defeated Thornhill Thunderbirds 4-games-to-none
North York Rangers defeated Vaughan Vipers 4-games-to-none
Markham Waxers defeated Pickering Panthers 4-games-to-2

Divisional Semi-final

Port Hope Predators defeated Trenton Sting 4-games-to-none
Wellington Dukes defeated Kingston Voyageurs 4-games-to-1
Aurora Tigers defeated Huntsville-Muskoka Otters 4-games-to-2
Newmarket Hurricanes defeated Stouffville Spirit 4-games-to-2
Georgetown Raiders defeated Milton Icehawks 4-games-to-1
Oakville Blades defeated Hamilton Red Wings 4-games-to-1
Wexford Raiders defeated Markham Waxers 4-games-to-1
St. Michael's Buzzers defeated North York Rangers 4-games-to-1

Divisional Final

Port Hope Predators defeated Wellington Dukes 4-games-to-1
Aurora Tigers defeated Newmarket Hurricanes 4-games-to-2
Georgetown Raiders defeated Oakville Blades 4-games-to-1
St. Michael's Buzzers defeated Wexford Raiders 4-games-to-1

Semi-final

St. Michael's Buzzers defeated Port Hope Predators 4-games-to-2
Georgetown Raiders defeated Aurora Tigers 4-games-to-3

Final

St. Michael's Buzzers defeated Georgetown Raiders 4-games-to-2

== Dudley Hewitt Cup Championship ==
Hosted by Georgetown Raiders in Georgetown, Ontario. Georgetown won the event, St. Michael's finished second.

Round Robin

Fort William North Stars (SIJHL) defeated St. Michael's Buzzers 6-4
Georgetown Raiders defeated North Bay Skyhawks (NOJHL) 7-2
St. Michael's Buzzers defeated North Bay Skyhawks (NOJHL) 4-3 (4OT)
Georgetown Raiders defeated Fort William North Stars (SIJHL) 4-0
Georgetown Raiders defeated St. Michael's Buzzers 5-4

Semi-final

St. Michael's Buzzers defeated Fort William North Stars (SIJHL) 6-2

Final

Georgetown Raiders defeated St. Michael's Buzzers 3-1

== 2005 Royal Bank Cup Championship ==
Hosted by Weyburn Red Wings in Weyburn, Saskatchewan. Georgetown finished in the semi-final.

Round Robin

Weyburn Red Wings (SJHL) defeated Georgetown Raiders 4-3
Georgetown Raiders defeated Hawkesbury Hawks (CJHL) 3-0
Georgetown Raiders defeated Portage Terriers (MJHL) 6-3
Camrose Kodiaks (AJHL) defeated Georgetown Raiders 2-1

Semi-final

Camrose Kodiaks (AJHL) defeated Georgetown Raiders 8-2

== Awards and honours ==
=== Scoring leaders ===
Note: GP = Games played; G = Goals; A = Assists; Pts = Points; PIM = Penalty minutes

Player	Team	GP	G	A	Pts
Andrew Cogliano	St. Michael's Buzzers	49	36	66	102
Chris Moran	Buffalo Lightning	49	38	62	100

=== Rookie of the Year ===
- Peter Leblanc

=== Players selected in 2005 NHL entry draft ===
- Rd 1 #25 Andrew Cogliano - Edmonton Oilers (St. Michael's Buzzers)

== See also ==
- 2005 Royal Bank Cup
- Dudley Hewitt Cup
- List of OJHL seasons
- Northern Ontario Junior Hockey League
- Superior International Junior Hockey League
- Greater Ontario Junior Hockey League
- 2004 in ice hockey
- 2005 in ice hockey

Preceded by 2003–04 OPJHL season	OJHL seasons	Succeeded by 2005–06 OPJHL season
