= 2000–01 OPJHL season =

- League: Ontario Provincial Junior A Hockey League
- Sport: Hockey
- Duration: Regular season 2000-09 – 2001-02; Playoffs; 2001-02 – 2001-04
- Number of teams: 37
- Finals champions: Thornhill Rattlers

OPJHL seasons
- ← 1999–00 2001–02 →

The 2000–01 OPJHL season is the eighth season of the Ontario Provincial Junior A Hockey League (OPJHL). The thirty-seven teams of the North, South, East, and West divisions competed in a 49-game schedule.

Come February, the top eight teams of each division competed for the Frank L. Buckland Trophy, the OPJHL championship. The winner of the Buckland Cup, the Thornhill Rattlers, went on to win the Dudley Hewitt Cup as Central Canadian Champions. The Rattlers were not successful in winning the 2001 Royal Bank Cup.

== Changes ==
- Port Hope Buzzards become the Port Hope Clippers

== Final standings ==
Note: GP = Games played; W = Wins; L = Losses; OTL = Overtime losses; SL = Shootout losses; GF = Goals for; GA = Goals against; PTS = Points; x = clinched playoff berth; y = clinched division title; z = clinched conference title

East Division
Team	GP	W	L	T	OTL	GF	GA	P
Lindsay Muskies	49	35	10	4	0	222	131	74
Wellington Dukes	49	30	9	6	4	226	142	70
Trenton Sting	49	29	13	4	3	210	148	65
Kingston Voyageurs	49	25	16	7	1	202	159	58
Peterborough Bees	49	23	16	7	3	203	199	56
Cobourg Cougars	49	23	20	5	1	214	179	52
Bowmanville Eagles	49	19	21	7	2	187	181	47
Syracuse Jr. Crunch	49	20	24	4	1	195	234	45
Bancroft Hawks	49	11	35	1	2	171	246	25
Port Hope Clippers	49	4	44	1	0	99	338	9
North Division
Team	GP	W	L	T	OTL	GF	GA	P
Couchiching Terriers	49	37	7	3	2	358	176	79
Newmarket Hurricanes	49	37	7	2	3	284	145	79
Stouffville Spirit	49	35	9	3	2	260	159	75
Collingwood Blues	49	27	19	2	1	224	142	57
Aurora Tigers	49	18	29	0	2	189	271	38
Parry Sound Shamrocks	49	12	35	2	0	144	280	26
Huntsville Wildcats	49	9	35	2	3	121	290	23
Durham Huskies	49	7	35	5	2	137	288	21
South Division
Team	GP	W	L	T	OTL	GF	GA	P
Thornhill Rattlers	49	36	8	3	2	231	148	77
Wexford Raiders	49	35	7	5	2	259	168	77
Markham Waxers	49	28	18	2	1	223	182	59
Pickering Panthers	49	21	19	7	2	198	194	51
Oshawa Legionaires	49	23	22	2	2	176	181	50
St. Michael's Buzzers	49	23	22	3	1	204	215	50
Ajax Axemen	49	23	23	3	0	206	202	49
Vaughan Vipers	49	19	23	5	2	169	173	45
North York Rangers	49	2	43	3	1	121	271	8
West Division
Team	GP	W	L	T	OTL	GF	GA	P
Milton Merchants	49	29	14	5	1	210	168	64
Georgetown Raiders	49	28	17	2	2	229	182	60
Brampton Capitals	49	26	15	7	1	182	143	60
Mississauga Chargers	49	25	16	3	5	216	194	58
Buffalo Lightning	49	25	16	7	1	203	176	58
Streetsville Derbys	49	25	19	4	1	231	219	55
Hamilton Kiltys	49	21	22	4	2	174	204	48
Bramalea Blues	49	18	23	4	4	182	206	44
Oakville Blades	49	14	27	6	2	185	228	36
Burlington Cougars	49	12	31	4	2	147	233	30

== 2000-01 Frank L. Buckland Trophy Playoffs ==
Division Quarter-final

Milton Merchants defeated Bramalea Blues 4-games-to-3
Brampton Capitals defeated Streetsville Derbys 4-games-to-1
Mississauga Chargers defeated Buffalo Lightning 4-games-to-2
Georgetown Raiders defeated Hamilton Kiltys 4-games-to-3
Kingston Voyageurs defeated Peterborough Bees 4-games-to-2
Lindsay Muskies defeated Syracuse Jr. Crunch 4-games-to-none
Wellington Dukes defeated Bowmanville Eagles 4-games-to-1
Trenton Sting defeated Cobourg Cougars 4-games-to-3
Newmarket Hurricanes defeated Durham Huskies 4-games-to-none
Stouffville Spirit defeated Parry Sound Shamrocks 4-games-to-none
Couchiching Terriers defeated Ajax Axemen 4-games-to-none
Collingwood Blues defeated Aurora Tigers 4-games-to-1
Markham Waxers defeated Oshawa Legionaires 4-games-to-none
Wexford Raiders defeated Vaughan Vipers 4-games-to-2
Thornhill Rattlers defeated Huntsville Wildcats 4-games-to-none
St. Michael's Buzzers defeated Pickering Panthers 4-games-to-1

Division Semi-final

Milton Merchants defeated Mississauga Chargers 4-games-to-1
Brampton Capitals defeated Hamilton Kiltys 4-games-to-1
Newmarket Hurricanes defeated Collingwood Blues 4-games-to-1
Couchiching Terriers defeated Stouffville Spirit 4-games-to-2
Thornhill Rattlers defeated St. Michael's Buzzers 4-games-to-none
Wexford Raiders defeated Markham Waxers 4-games-to-3
Lindsay Muskies defeated Kingston Voyageurs 4-games-to-none
Trenton Sting defeated Wellington Dukes 4-games-to-1

Division Final

Milton Merchants defeated Brampton Capitals 4-games-to-3
Couchiching Terriers defeated Newmarket Hurricanes 4-games-to-3
Thornhill Rattlers defeated Wexford Raiders 4-games-to-2
Trenton Sting defeated Lindsay Muskies 4-games-to-3

Semi-final

Couchiching Terriers defeated Milton Merchants 4-games-to-2
Thornhill Rattlers defeated Trenton Sting 4-games-to-1

Final

Thornhill Rattlers defeated Couchiching Terriers 4-games-to-1

== Dudley Hewitt Cup Championship ==
Best-of-7

Thornhill Rattlers defeated Rayside-Balfour Sabrecats (NOJHL) 4-games-to-3

Rayside-Balfour 3 - Thornhill 2
Thornhill 4 - Rayside-Balfour 1
Thornhill 5 - Rayside-Balfour 1
Thornhill 6 - Rayside-Balfour 5
Rayside-Balfour 3 - Thornhill 2 OT
Rayside-Balfour 4 - Thornhill 1
Thornhill 3 - Rayside-Balfour 2 2OT

== 2001 Royal Bank Cup Championship ==
Hosted by Flin Flon Bombers in Flin Flon, Manitoba. The Thornhill Rattlers finished in last place.

Round Robin

Camrose Kodiaks (AJHL) defeated Thornhill Rattlers 4-1
St. Jerome Panthers (QJAAAHL) defeated Thornhill Rattlers 5-4
Flin Flon Bombers (SJHL) defeated Thornhill Rattlers 5-2
Weyburn Red Wings (SJHL) defeated Thornhill Rattlers 5-3

== Scoring leaders ==
Note: GP = Games played; G = Goals; A = Assists; Pts = Points; PIM = Penalty minutes

Player	Team	GP	G	A	Pts
Jason Pinizzotto	Couchiching Terriers	49	54	86	140
David Wrigley	Couchiching Terriers	47	64	61	125
Beau Moyer	Couchiching Terriers	49	29	81	110
Stace Page	Georgetown Raiders	49	54	54	108
Jaro Wojcicki	Couchiching Terriers	47	44	58	102
Scott Misfud	Thornhill Rattlers	48	43	57	100

== See also ==
- 2001 Royal Bank Cup
- Dudley Hewitt Cup
- List of OJHL seasons
- Northern Ontario Junior Hockey League
- Superior International Junior Hockey League
- Greater Ontario Junior Hockey League
- 2000 in ice hockey
- 2001 in ice hockey

Preceded by 1999–2000 OPJHL season	OJHL seasons	Succeeded by 2001–02 OPJHL season
