= 2005–06 OPJHL season =

- League: Ontario Provincial Junior A Hockey League
- Sport: Hockey
- Duration: Regular season 2005-09-08 – 2006-02-08; Playoffs; 2006-02-08 – 2006-04-16
- Teams: 36
- Finals champions: St. Michael's Buzzers

OPJHL seasons
- 2004–05 2006–07

The 2005–06 OPJHL season is the 13th season of the Ontario Provincial Junior A Hockey League (OPJHL). The thirty-six teams of the North, South, East, and West divisions will compete in a 49-game schedule.

Come February, the top eight teams of each division competed for the Frank L. Buckland Trophy, the OJHL championship. The winner of the Buckland Cup, the St. Michael's Buzzers, competed in the Central Canadian Junior "A" championship, the Dudley Hewitt Cup, and finished. If they had been successful against the winners of the Northern Ontario Junior Hockey League and Superior International Junior Hockey League, the champion Buzzers would have then moved on to play in the Canadian Junior A Hockey League championship, the 2006 Royal Bank Cup.

== Changes ==
- Thornhill Thunderbirds became Toronto Thunderbirds
- Buffalo Lightning became Buffalo Jr. Sabres
- Ajax Axemen became Ajax Attack
- Seguin Bruins join the league
- Oswego Admirals join the league
- Syracuse Jr. Crunch leave the league

== Final standings ==
as of February 6, 2006

Note: GP = Games played; W = Wins; L = Losses; OTL = Overtime losses; SL = Shootout losses; GF = Goals for; GA = Goals against; PTS = Points; x = clinched playoff berth; y = clinched division title; z = clinched conference title

East Division
Team	GP	W	L	T	OTL	GF	GA	P
Bowmanville Eagles	49	39	5	5	0	255	95	83
Port Hope Predators	49	39	6	4	0	300	111	82
Wellington Dukes	49	33	8	6	2	261	120	74
Peterborough Stars	49	25	19	3	2	203	203	55
Kingston Voyageurs	49	23	23	2	1	153	179	49
Oswego Admirals	49	17	26	4	2	150	193	40
Trenton Sting	49	17	26	4	2	143	196	40
Lindsay Muskies	49	14	29	6	0	144	202	34
Bancroft Hawks	49	11	35	1	2	144	282	25
Cobourg Cougars	49	6	40	3	0	114	297	15
North Division
Team	GP	W	L	T	OTL	GF	GA	P
Aurora Tigers	49	35	8	4	2	210	112	76
Newmarket Hurricanes	48	32	12	3	1	217	129	68
Stouffville Spirit	49	26	10	9	4	172	138	65
Collingwood Blues	48	22	19	6	1	171	172	51
Couchiching Terriers	48	17	22	8	1	146	177	43
Seguin Bruins	49	13	26	8	2	154	185	36
Huntsville-Muskoka Otters	48	12	28	5	3	135	219	32
South Division
Team	GP	W	L	T	OTL	GF	GA	P
St. Michael's Buzzers	49	29	12	5	3	226	153	66
Markham Waxers	49	29	14	5	1	193	152	64
Pickering Panthers	49	30	17	1	1	228	173	62
North York Rangers	49	24	17	6	2	210	177	56
Wexford Raiders	49	23	18	8	0	188	171	54
Vaughan Vipers	49	22	19	5	3	193	180	52
Toronto Thunderbirds	49	23	23	3	0	203	203	49
Oshawa Legionaires	49	9	35	4	1	144	241	23
Ajax Attack	49	5	41	0	3	124	333	13
West Division
Team	GP	W	L	T	OTL	GF	GA	P
Milton Icehawks	49	41	3	4	1	254	97	87
Hamilton Red Wings	49	33	14	1	1	204	124	68
Georgetown Raiders	49	27	16	4	2	188	131	60
Oakville Blades	49	26	17	3	3	231	147	58
Burlington Cougars	49	26	18	2	3	167	156	57
Streetsville Derbys	49	25	19	3	2	172	170	55
Brampton Capitals	49	23	21	4	1	186	159	51
Mississauga Chargers	49	16	29	4	0	173	221	36
Bramalea Blues	49	10	36	1	2	127	278	23
Buffalo Jr. Sabres	49	4	41	4	0	85	292	12

Teams listed on the official league website .

Standings listed by Pointstreak on official league website .

== 2005-06 Frank L. Buckland Trophy Playoffs ==
=== The Final Four ===
Semi-finals
E1	Bowmanville	1
S1	St. Michael's	4
N3	Stouffville	4
W4	Oakville	3

Buckland Trophy Finals
S1	St. Michael's	4
N3	Stouffville	2

=== Division Playdowns ===
==== East/South ====
Conference Quarter-finals	Conference Semi-finals
1	Bowmanville	4
8	Lindsay	0
1	Bowmanville	4
5	Kingston	0
4	Peterborough	2
5	Kingston	4
East
2	Port Hope	4
7	Oswego	0
2	Port Hope	4
3	Wellington	2
3	Wellington	4
6	Trenton	2
1	St. Michael's	4
8	Oshawa	1
1	St. Michael's	4
5	Wexford	1
4	North York	1
5	Wexford	4
South
2	Markham	4
7	Toronto	1
2	Markham	4
3	Pickering	0
3	Pickering	4
6	Vaughan	2

Conference Finals
1	Bowmanville	4
2	Port Hope	1
1	St. Michael's	4
2	Markham	0

Buckland Trophy Semi-final
1	Bowmanville	1
1	St. Michael's	4

==== West/North ====
Conference Quarter-finals	Conference Semi-finals
1	Milton	4
8	Mississauga	0
1	Milton	3
4	Oakville	4
4	Oakville	4
5	Burlington	1
West
2	Hamilton	4
7	Brampton	0
2	Hamilton	4
3	Georgetown	2
3	Georgetown	4
6	Streetsville	2
1	Aurora	4
8	Bancroft	0
1	Aurora	4
4	Collingwood	1
4	Collingwood	4
5	Couchiching	1
North
2	Newmarket	4
7	Huntsville	1
2	Newmarket	2
3	Stouffville	4
3	Stouffville	4
6	Seguin	2

Conference Finals
2	Hamilton	0
4	Oakville	4
2	Aurora	2
3	Stouffville	4

Buckland Trophy Semi-final
3	Stouffville	4
4	Oakville	3

Note: E is East, S is South, W is West, N is North, WC is Wild Card.

Playoff results are listed by Pointstreak on the official league website .

== Dudley Hewitt Cup Championship ==
Hosted by Fort William North Stars in Thunder Bay, Ontario. St. Michael's finished fourth.

Round Robin

Dryden Ice Dogs 3 - St. Michael's Buzzers 2
St. Michael's Buzzers 7 - Fort William North Stars 1
Sudbury Jr. Wolves 5 - St. Michael's Buzzers 2

== 2006 Royal Bank Cup Championship ==
Hosted by Streetsville Derbys in Brampton, Ontario. Streetsville finished in the semi-final.

Round Robin

Streetsville Derbys 4 - Burnaby Express 3 OT
Streetsville Derbys 3 - Fort William North Stars 2
Streetsville Derbys 2 - Yorkton Terriers 1
Joliette Action 4 - Streetsville Derbys 1

Semi-final

Yorkton Terriers 2 - Streetsville Derbys 1

== Scoring leaders ==
Note: GP = Games played; G = Goals; A = Assists; Pts = Points; PIM = Penalty minutes

Player	Team	GP	G	A	Pts	PIM
Mark Prentice	Port Hope Predators	49	56	44	100	44
Joshua Gillam	Peterborough Stars	47	45	48	93	38
David McIntyre	Newmarket Hurricanes	46	42	50	92	143
Chris Auger	Wellington Dukes	47	41	51	92	46
Matt Beca	Oakville Blades	49	43	43	86	54
Joey Wilson	Newmarket Hurricanes	48	39	46	85	103
Rusty Masters	Port Hope Predators	49	34	50	84	32
Mike McKenzie	St. Michael's Buzzers	40	39	38	77	110
Brett Molnar	Markham Waxers	49	32	45	77	112
Ryan Olidis	Markham Waxers	48	24	50	74	66

== Leading goaltenders ==
Note: GP = Games played; Mins = Minutes played; W = Wins; L = Losses: OTL = Overtime losses; SL = Shootout losses; GA = Goals Allowed; SO = Shutouts; GAA = Goals against average

Player	Team	GP	Mins	W	L	T	GA	SO	Sv%	GAA
Bryan Scott	Bowmanville Eagles	29	1689:31	22	2	4	54	3	.921	1.92
Zach Kleiman	Milton Icehawks	32	1827:59	24	4	2	59	3	.927	1.94
Andrew Loverock	Milton Icehawks	21	1135:30	17	0	2	38	1	.914	2.01
Paul Dainton	Port Hope Predators	43	2505:40	34	5	3	89	6	.922	2.13
Ryan Dickie	Aurora Tigers	24	1374:01	16	6	1	50	5	.916	2.18

== Players selected in 2006 NHL entry draft ==
- Rd 5 #138 David McIntyre - Dallas Stars (Newmarket Hurricanes)
- Rd 6 #169 Chris Auger - Chicago Blackhawks (Wellington Dukes)
- Rd 7 #186 Peter LeBlanc - Chicago Blackhawks (Hamilton Red Wings)

== See also ==
- 2006 Royal Bank Cup
- Dudley Hewitt Cup
- List of OJHL seasons
- Northern Ontario Junior Hockey League
- Superior International Junior Hockey League
- Greater Ontario Junior Hockey League
- 2005 in ice hockey
- 2006 in ice hockey

Preceded by 2004–05 OPJHL season	OJHL seasons	Succeeded by 2006–07 OPJHL season
