= 1999–2000 OPJHL season =

- League: Ontario Provincial Junior A Hockey League
- Sport: Hockey
- Duration: Regular season 1999-09 – 2000-02; Playoffs; 2000-02 – 2000-04
- Teams: 37
- Finals champions: Brampton Capitals

OPJHL seasons
- 1998–99 2000–01

The 1999–2000 OPJHL season is the seventh season of the Ontario Provincial Junior A Hockey League (OPJHL). The thirty-five teams of the North, South, East, and West divisions competed in a 49-game schedule.

Come February, the top eight teams of each division competed for the Frank L. Buckland Trophy, the OPJHL championship. The winner of the Buckland Cup, the Brampton Capitals, failed to win the Dudley Hewitt Cup as Central Canadian Champions.

== Changes ==
- League returns to 4 divisions, from 3.
- Auburn Jr. Crunch change name to Syracuse Jr. Crunch.
- Shelburne Wolves leave OPJHL.
- Caledon Canadians leave OPJHL.
- Parry Sound Shamrocks join OPJHL from NOJHL.
- St. Michael's Buzzers rejoin OPJHL.

== Final standings ==
Note: GP = Games played; W = Wins; L = Losses; OTL = Overtime losses; SL = Shootout losses; GF = Goals for; GA = Goals against; PTS = Points; x = clinched playoff berth; y = clinched division title; z = clinched conference title

East Division
Team	GP	W	L	T	OTL	GF	GA	P
Lindsay Muskies	49	41	3	3	2	244	104	87
Wellington Dukes	49	33	9	6	1	257	144	73
Trenton Sting	49	30	15	3	1	242	179	64
Cobourg Cougars	49	25	21	2	1	199	190	53
Kingston Voyageurs	49	23	20	4	2	193	181	52
Bowmanville Eagles	49	19	24	6	0	188	208	44
Bancroft Hawks	49	18	25	3	3	177	221	42
Peterborough Bees	49	17	26	3	3	184	202	40
Port Hope Buzzards	49	11	37	0	1	158	303	23
Syracuse Jr. Crunch	49	9	36	2	2	170	303	22
North Division
Team	GP	W	L	T	OTL	GF	GA	P
Newmarket Hurricanes	49	37	10	1	1	296	167	76
Couchiching Terriers	49	35	12	2	0	258	152	72
Collingwood Blues	47	26	13	5	3	243	148	60
Aurora Tigers	47	27	15	5	0	150	130	59
Stouffville Spirit	49	24	23	2	0	195	190	50
Huntsville Wildcats	49	21	20	6	2	181	198	50
Parry Sound Shamrocks	48	8	34	4	2	154	294	22
Durham Huskies	49	5	39	3	2	132	338	15
South Division
Team	GP	W	L	T	OTL	GF	GA	P
Vaughan Vipers	49	36	7	3	3	221	125	78
Thornhill Rattlers	49	33	9	4	3	264	170	73
Wexford Raiders	49	32	11	3	3	237	164	70
Markham Waxers	48	24	18	3	3	211	193	54
North York Rangers	49	17	26	6	0	167	206	40
Ajax Axemen	49	16	26	6	1	159	216	39
St. Michael's Buzzers	49	18	28	3	0	183	231	39
Oshawa Legionaires	49	13	29	4	3	157	212	33
Pickering Panthers	49	11	32	4	2	154	218	28
West Division
Team	GP	W	L	T	OTL	GF	GA	P
Georgetown Raiders	49	32	10	5	2	238	180	71
Brampton Capitals	49	30	12	4	3	221	174	67
Milton Merchants	49	30	13	3	3	231	158	66
Streetsville Derbys	49	27	17	5	0	213	208	59
Hamilton Kiltys	49	25	17	5	2	247	206	57
Burlington Cougars	49	23	20	5	1	166	174	52
Mississauga Chargers	49	19	24	2	4	190	220	44
Oakville Blades	49	16	21	9	3	209	246	44
Buffalo Lightning	49	13	32	2	2	170	236	30
Bramalea Blues	49	10	33	2	4	142	217	26

== 1999-2000 Frank L. Buckland Trophy Playoffs ==
Division Quarter-final

Lindsay Muskies defeated Peterborough Bees 4-games-to-none
Wellington Dukes defeated Bancroft Hawks 4-games-to-none
Kingston Voyageurs defeated Cobourg Cougars 4-games-to-none
Trenton Sting defeated Bowmanville Eagles 4-games-to-2
Brampton Capitals defeated Mississauga Chargers 4-games-to-1
Georgetown Raiders defeated Oakville Blades 4-games-to-3
Burlington Cougars defeated Milton Merchants 4-games-to-3
Streetsville Derbys defeated Hamilton Kiltys 4-games-to-3
Newmarket Hurricanes defeated Parry Sound Shamrocks 4-games-to-none
Couchiching Terriers defeated Ajax Axemen 4-games-to-none
Stouffville Spirit defeated Aurora Tigers 4-games-to-none
Collingwood Blues defeated Huntsville Wildcats 4-games-to-3
Vaughan Vipers defeated Pickering Panthers 4-games-to-none
Thornhill Rattlers defeated Oshawa Legionaires 4-games-to-1
Wexford Raiders defeated St. Michael's Buzzers 4-games-to-1
Markham Waxers defeated North York Rangers 4-games-to-3

Division Semi-final

Couchiching Terriers defeated Collingwood Blues 4-games-to-1
Stouffville Spirit defeated Newmarket Hurricanes 4-games-to-2
Vaughan Vipers defeated Markham Waxers 4-games-to-1
Thornhill Rattlers defeated Wexford Raiders 4-games-to-1
Wellington Dukes defeated Trenton Sting 4-games-to-none
Lindsay Muskies defeated Kingston Voyageurs 4-games-to-none
Georgetown Raiders defeated Burlington Cougars 4-games-to-3
Brampton Capitals defeated Streetsville Derbys 4-games-to-none

Division Final

Couchiching Terriers defeated Stouffville Spirit 4-games-to-none
Thornhill Rattlers defeated Vaughan Vipers 4-games-to-none
Lindsay Muskies defeated Wellington Dukes 4-games-to-1
Brampton Capitals defeated Georgetown Raiders 4-games-to-none

Semi-final

Brampton Capitals defeated Couchiching Terriers 4-games-to-none
Lindsay Muskies defeated Thornhill Rattlers 4-games-to-1

Final

Brampton Capitals defeated Lindsay Muskies 4-games-to-2

== Dudley Hewitt Cup Championship ==
Best-of-7 series

Rayside-Balfour Sabrecats (NOJHL) defeated Brampton Capitals 4-games-to-1

Rayside-Balfour 4 - Brampton 1
Brampton 4 - Rayside-Balfour 1
Rayside-Balfour 2 - Brampton 1
Rayside-Balfour 3 - Brampton 2
Rayside-Balfour 13 - Brampton 1

== Scoring leaders ==
Note: GP = Games played; G = Goals; A = Assists; Pts = Points; PIM = Penalty minutes

Player	Team	GP	G	A	Pts
Pierre Rivard	Newmarket Hurricanes	49	35	77	112
Mike Brito	Collingwood Blues	47	50	61	111

== Players selected in 2000 NHL entry draft ==
- Rd 3 #67 Max Birbraer - New Jersey Devils (Newmarket Hurricanes)

== See also ==
- 2000 Royal Bank Cup
- Dudley Hewitt Cup
- List of OJHL seasons
- Northern Ontario Junior Hockey League
- Superior International Junior Hockey League
- Greater Ontario Junior Hockey League
- 1999 in ice hockey
- 2000 in ice hockey

Preceded by 1998–99 OPJHL season	OJHL seasons	Succeeded by 2000–01 OPJHL season
