= 1998–99 OPJHL season =

- League: Ontario Provincial Junior A Hockey League
- Sport: Hockey
- Duration: Regular season 1998-09 – 1999-02; Playoffs; 1999-02 – 1999-04
- Number of teams: 37
- Finals champions: Bramalea Blues

OPJHL seasons
- ← 1997–98 1999–2000 →

The 1998–99 OPJHL season is the sixth season of the Ontario Provincial Junior A Hockey League (OPJHL). The thirty-seven teams of the Central, East, and West divisions competed in a 51-game schedule. The top eight of each division made the Buckland Cup playoffs.

The winner of the Buckland Cup, the Bramalea Blues, won the 1999 Dudley Hewitt Cup as Central Canadian Champions, but failed to win the 1999 Royal Bank Cup.

== Changes ==
- OPJHL absorbed folded Metro Junior A Hockey League.
- League realigned from four to three divisions.
- New teams due to merger: Auburn Jr. Crunch (Syracuse Jr. Crunch), Bancroft Hawks (Quinte Hawks), Buffalo Lightning (Niagara Scenic), Caledon Canadians, Durham Huskies, Huntsville Wildcats, Markham Waxers, North York Rangers, Oshawa Legionaires, Pickering Panthers, Port Hope Buzzards, Shelburne Wolves, Thornhill Rattlers, Wellington Dukes, and Wexford Raiders.

== Final standings ==
Note: GP = Games played; W = Wins; L = Losses; OTL = Overtime losses; SL = Shootout losses; GF = Goals for; GA = Goals against; PTS = Points; x = clinched playoff berth; y = clinched division title; z = clinched conference title

Central Division
Collingwood Blues	51	41	8	1	1	309	126	84
Couchiching Terriers	51	37	10	4	0	299	193	78
Newmarket Hurricanes	51	36	11	4	0	256	144	76
Aurora Tigers	51	31	12	6	2	216	155	70
Markham Waxers	51	29	16	4	2	249	195	64
Wexford Raiders	51	21	20	8	2	211	206	52
Thornhill Rattlers	51	23	24	3	1	230	213	50
Stouffville Spirit	51	23	27	0	1	215	234	47
North York Rangers	51	15	30	4	2	165	225	36
Shelburne Wolves	51	10	35	4	2	171	314	26
Durham Huskies	51	9	35	3	4	156	292	25
Huntsville Wildcats	51	9	37	4	1	142	323	23
East Division
Team	GP	W	L	T	OTL	GF	GA	P
Pickering Panthers	51	37	14	0	0	249	162	74
Trenton Sting	51	33	13	3	2	265	184	71
Lindsay Muskies	51	32	13	4	2	222	153	70
Kingston Voyageurs	51	29	15	5	2	211	179	65
Oshawa Legionaires	51	26	20	3	2	221	214	57
Auburn Jr. Crunch	51	27	22	2	0	232	195	56
Wellington Dukes	51	23	23	3	2	205	223	51
Cobourg Cougars	51	20	20	9	2	213	178	51
Bowmanville Eagles	51	18	23	6	4	188	206	46
Ajax Axemen	51	17	27	6	1	153	233	41
Port Hope Buzzards	51	16	27	6	2	193	266	40
Peterborough Bees	51	15	26	7	3	169	214	40
Bancroft Hawks	51	12	37	1	1	124	224	26
West Division
Team	GP	W	L	T	OTL	GF	GA	P
Milton Merchants	51	43	4	3	1	308	138	90
Bramalea Blues	51	38	6	7	0	296	158	83
Brampton Capitals	51	35	10	6	0	293	185	76
Burlington Cougars	51	29	19	2	1	256	203	61
Georgetown Raiders	51	27	18	4	2	264	239	60
Streetsville Derbys	51	27	20	3	1	259	245	58
Oakville Blades	51	22	23	4	2	216	216	50
Hamilton Kiltys	51	19	26	6	0	191	231	44
Caledon Canadians	51	16	30	2	3	203	271	37
Buffalo Lightning	51	11	34	4	2	148	249	28
Vaughan Vipers	51	9	38	2	2	198	346	22
Mississauga Chargers	51	6	41	3	1	161	321	16

== 1998-99 Frank L. Buckland Trophy Playoffs ==
Division Quarter-final

Collingwood Blues defeated Stouffville Spirit 3-games-to-none
Couchiching Terriers defeated Thornhill Rattlers 3-games-to-2
Newmarket Hurricanes defeated Wexford Raiders 3-games-to-1
Aurora Tigers defeated Markham Waxers 3-games-to-1
Pickering Panthers defeated Cobourg Cougars 3-games-to-none
Trenton Sting defeated Wellington Dukes 3-games-to-none
Lindsay Muskies defeated Auburn Jr. Crunch 3-games-to-none
Oshawa Legionaires defeated Kingston Voyageurs 3-games-to-1
Milton Merchants defeated Hamilton Kiltys 3-games-to-none
Bramalea Blues defeated Oakville Blades 3-games-to-none
Streetsville Derbys defeated Brampton Capitals 3-games-to-2
Georgetown Raiders defeated Burlington Cougars 3-games-to-1

Division Semi-final

Collingwood Blues defeated Aurora Tigers 4-games-to-1
Couchiching Terriers defeated Newmarket Hurricanes 4-games-to-1
Pickering Panthers defeated Oshawa Legionaires 4-games-to-2
Lindsay Muskies defeated Trenton Sting 4-games-to-2
Milton Merchants defeated Georgetown Raiders 4-games-to-1
Bramalea Blues defeated Streetsville Derbys 4-games-to-none

Division Final

Collingwood Blues defeated Couchiching Terriers 4-games-to-3
Bramalea Blues defeated Milton Merchants 4-games-to-2
Pickering Panthers defeated Lindsay Muskies 4-games-to-none

Semi-final

Milton Merchants* defeated Collingwood Blues 4-games-to-2
Bramalea Blues defeated Pickering Panthers 4-games-to-none

(*) denotes that the Merchants were welcomed back into the playoffs for another round despite losing due to their superior playoff winning percentage over Couchiching and Lindsay.

Final

Bramalea Blues defeated Milton Merchants 4-games-to-2

== Dudley Hewitt Cup Championship ==
Best-of-7 series

Bramalea Blues defeated Rayside-Balfour Sabrecats (NOJHL) 4-games-to-none

Bramalea - Rayside-Balfour
Bramalea 2 - Rayside-Balfour 1
Bramalea 3 - Rayside-Balfour 2
Bramalea 3 - Rayside-Balfour 2

== 1999 Royal Bank Cup Championship ==
The 1999 Royal Bank Cup was hosted by the Yorkton Terriers of Yorkton, Saskatchewan. The Bramalea Blues were defeated in the semi-final.

Round Robin

Bramalea Blues defeated Vernon Vipers (BCHL) 4-2
Bramalea Blues defeated Estevan Bruins (SJHL) 4-3
Bramalea Blues defeated Yorkton Terriers (SJHL) 5-1
Charlottetown Abbies (MJAHL) defeated Bramalea Blues 5-1

Semi-final

Vernon Vipers (BCHL) defeated Bramalea Blues 3-2

== Scoring leaders ==
Note: GP = Games played; G = Goals; A = Assists; Pts = Points; PIM = Penalty minutes

Player	Team	GP	G	A	Pts
Stace Page	Georgetown Raiders	50	54	69	123
Shawn Baltzer	Newmarket Hurricanes	51	42	80	122
Jason Bullock	Couchiching Terriers	47	33	83	116
Ed McGrane	Milton/Hamilton	49	47	68	115
Kyle Amyotte	Bramalea Blues	50	43	72	115
Geoff Schomogyi	Milton Merchants	50	43	62	105
Andy Rozak	Streetsville Derbys	51	33	71	104
Donald Patrick	Auburn Jr. Crunch	51	44	60	104
Mike Cammalleri	Bramalea Blues	41	31	72	103
Kevin O'Flaherty	Milton Merchants	50	32	71	103

== See also ==
- 1999 Royal Bank Cup
- Dudley Hewitt Cup
- List of OJHL seasons
- Northern Ontario Junior Hockey League
- Superior International Junior Hockey League
- Greater Ontario Junior Hockey League
- 1998 in ice hockey
- 1999 in ice hockey

Preceded by 1997–98 OPJHL season	OJHL seasons	Succeeded by 1999–2000 OPJHL season
