= 1993–94 OPJHL season =

- League: Ontario Provincial Junior A Hockey League
- Sport: Hockey
- Duration: Regular season 1993-09 – 1994-02; Playoffs; 1994-02 – 1994-04
- Teams: 17
- Finals champions: Orillia Terriers

OPJHL seasons
- 1992–93 CJAHL 1994–95

The 1993–94 OPJHL season is the first season of the Ontario Provincial Junior A Hockey League (OPJHL). The nine teams of the East Division competed in a 40-game schedule, while the eight teams of the West Division played a 42-game schedule. The top 8 teams of each division make the playoffs.

The winner of the OPJHL playoffs, the Orillia Terriers, failed to win the 1996 Buckland Cup for the OHA championship.

== Changes ==
- League changes name from Central Junior A Hockey League to Ontario Provincial Junior A Hockey League.
- League joins Canadian Junior A Hockey League.
- Hamilton Kiltys join OPJHL from GHJHL.
- Caledon Canadians leave OPJHL for MetJHL.
- Mississauga Derbys move and become Streetsville Derbys.

== Final standings ==
Note: GP = Games played; W = Wins; L = Losses; OTL = Overtime losses; SL = Shootout losses; GF = Goals for; GA = Goals against; PTS = Points; x = clinched playoff berth; y = clinched division title; z = clinched conference title

East Division
Team	GP	W	L	T	GF	GA	P
Orillia Terriers	40	35	2	3	252	112	74
Newmarket 87's	40	24	14	2	240	172	53
Barrie Colts	40	22	16	2	175	145	47
Markham Waxers	40	19	17	4	199	191	43
Ajax Axemen	40	17	17	6	183	199	40
Cobourg Cougars	40	17	20	3	197	199	39
Peterborough Jr. Petes	40	16	22	2	204	223	34
Collingwood Blues	40	10	29	1	127	223	22
Lindsay Bears	40	6	29	5	125	238	17
West Division
Team	GP	W	L	T	GF	GA	P
Hamilton Kiltys	42	32	8	2	265	172	66
Burlington Cougars	42	27	12	3	255	180	58
Brampton Capitals	42	27	15	0	263	207	56
Oakville Blades	42	25	15	2	249	195	53
Milton Merchants	42	24	16	2	228	183	52
Streetsville Derbys	42	17	21	4	192	199	39
Georgetown Raiders	42	8	34	0	170	265	17
Royal York Rangers	42	1	40	1	124	345	3

== 1993-94 OPJHL Playoffs ==
Division Quarter-final

Hamilton Kiltys defeated Royal York Rangers 4-games-to-none
Burlington Cougars defeated Georgetown Raiders 4-games-to-none
Streetsville Derbys defeated Brampton Capitals 4-games-to-2
Oakville Blades defeated Milton Merchants 4-games-to-2
Orillia Terriers defeated Collingwood Blues 4-games-to-none
Newmarket 87's defeated Peterborough Jr. Petes 4-games-to-none
Barrie Colts defeated Ajax Axemen 4-games-to-1
Cobourg Cougars defeated Markham Waxers 4-games-to-2

Division Semi-final

Hamilton Kiltys defeated Streetsville Derbys 4-games-to-3
Oakville Blades defeated Burlington Cougars 4-games-to-none
Orillia Terriers defeated Cobourg Cougars 4-games-to-none
Newmarket 87's defeated Barrie Colts 4-games-to-1

Division Final

Hamilton Kiltys defeated Oakville Blades 4-games-to-3
Orillia Terriers defeated Newmarket 87's 4-games-to-1

Final

Orillia Terriers defeated Hamilton Kiltys 4-games-to-2

== OHA Buckland Cup Championship ==
The 1994 Dudley Hewitt Cup was hosted by the Caledon Canadians in North York, Ontario. The Orillia Terriers lost in the final.

Round Robin

Orillia Terriers defeated Powassan Hawks (NOJHL) 1-0
Orillia Terriers defeated Wexford Raiders (MetJHL) 4-3 OT
Orillia Terriers defeated Caledon Canadians (MetJHL) 3-0

Final

Caledon Canadians (MetHL) defeated Orillia Terriers 3-1

== Players selected in 1994 NHL entry draft ==
- Rd 4 #79 Adam Copeland - Edmonton Oilers (Burlington Cougars)

== See also ==
- 1994 Centennial Cup
- Dudley Hewitt Cup
- List of OJHL seasons
- Northern Ontario Junior Hockey League
- Superior International Junior Hockey League
- Greater Ontario Junior Hockey League

Preceded by 1992–93 CJAHL season	OJHL seasons	Succeeded by 1994–95 OPJHL season
