= Brian Perrin =

Australian rules footballer

Personal information
- Full name: Brian Perrin
- Born: 30 July 1957 (age 69)
- Original team: Bairnsdale
- Height: 180 cm (5 ft 11 in)
- Weight: 87 kg (192 lb)

Playing career^{1}
Years	Club	Games (Goals)
1980–83	Footscray	34 (8)
- ^{1} Playing statistics correct to the end of 1983.

Brian Perrin (born 30 July 1957) is a former Australian rules footballer who played with Footscray in the Victorian Football League (VFL).
