= 2003 in ice hockey =

The following is a chronicle of events during the year 2003 in ice hockey.

== National Hockey League ==
- Art Ross Trophy as the NHL's leading scorer during the regular season: Peter Forsberg
- Hart Memorial Trophy: for the NHL's Most Valuable Player: Peter Forsberg
- Stanley Cup - New Jersey Devils defeat the Mighty Ducks of Anaheim

== Canadian Hockey League ==
- Ontario Hockey League: the J. Ross Robertson Cup.
- Quebec Major Junior Hockey League: President's Cup (QMJHL)
- Western Hockey League: President's Cup (WHL)
- Memorial Cup: Kitchener Rangers

== World Hockey Championship ==
  - Men's champion: Canada defeated Sweden by a 3-2 mark at the 2003 Men's Ice Hockey World Championships
  - Junior Men's champion: At the 2003 World Junior Ice Hockey Championships, the Russia men's national junior ice hockey team won the gold medal.

== Women's hockey ==
- The top division of the 2003 IIHF Women's World Ice Hockey Championship was set to be held in Beijing, China, from April 4–9, 2003. However, it was cancelled due to the SARS crisis.
- November 15, 2003: Kim St. Pierre was the first woman in CIS history to be credited with a win in a men's regular season game. This occurred when the McGill Redmen defeated the Ryerson Rams by a score of 5–2.

== Season articles ==
2002–03 NHL season	2003–04 NHL season
2002–03 AHL season	2003–04 AHL season
2002–03 ECHL season	2003–04 ECHL season
2002–03 OHL season	2003–04 OHL season
2002–03 QMJHL season	2003–04 QMJHL season
2002–03 WHL season	2003–04 WHL season

== See also ==
- 2003 in sports
