= Lindsay Muskies =

- City: Lindsay, Ontario, Canada
- League: Ontario Junior Hockey League
- Founded: 1960's
- Home arena: Lindsay Recreation Complex
- Colours: Teal, black, white
- General manager: Brendan O'Grady
- Head coach: Brendan O'Grady
- Affiliates: Little Britain Merchants (COJCHL); Peterborough Petes (OHL)
- Website: lindsaymuskies.ojhl.ca

Franchise history
- pre-1989: Lindsay Muskies
- 1989-94: Lindsay Bears
- 1994-Present: Lindsay Muskies
- 2012: Merged with Peterborough Stars

The Lindsay Muskies are a Junior "A" ice hockey team from Lindsay, Ontario, Canada. They are a part of the Ontario Junior Hockey League.

== History ==
The Muskies started out in the Central Junior C Hockey League. In 1989, the team jumped to the Central Junior "B" and stayed with the league when it became the OPJHL in 1993.

== Season-by-season results ==
| Season | GP | W | L | T | OTL | GF | GA | P | Results | Playoffs |
| 1987-88 | 32 | 11 | 19 | 2 | - | 161 | 186 | 24 | 7th COJCHL | |
| 1988-89 | 40 | 6 | 27 | 7 | - | 139 | 236 | 19 | 10th COJCHL | |
| 1989-90 | 42 | 11 | 22 | 9 | - | 189 | 222 | 31 | 11th CJBHL | |
| 1990-91 | 42 | 17 | 15 | 10 | - | 192 | 179 | 44 | 9th CJBHL | |
| 1991-92 | 42 | 24 | 13 | 5 | - | 219 | 198 | 53 | 4th CJBHL | |
| 1992-93 | 48 | 22 | 25 | 1 | - | 254 | 269 | 45 | 11th CJBHL | |
| 1993-94 | 40 | 6 | 29 | 5 | - | 125 | 238 | 17 | 9th OPJHL-E | DNQ |
| 1994-95 | 48 | 32 | 11 | 5 | - | 257 | 163 | 69 | 3rd OPJHL-E | Lost Conf. SF |
| 1995-96 | 50 | 25 | 22 | 3 | - | 232 | 212 | 55 | 4th OPJHL-P | Lost SF |
| 1996-97 | 51 | 17 | 29 | 5 | - | 188 | 247 | 42 | 4th OPJHL-P | Lost Conf. QF |
| 1997-98 | 51 | 23 | 20 | 5 | 3 | 198 | 186 | 54 | 4th OPJHL-P | DNQ |
| 1998-99 | 51 | 32 | 13 | 4 | 2 | 222 | 153 | 70 | 3rd OPJHL-E | Lost Conf. SF |
| 1999-00 | 49 | 41 | 3 | 3 | 2 | 244 | 104 | 87 | 1st OPJHL-E | Lost final |
| 2000-01 | 49 | 35 | 10 | 4 | 0 | 222 | 131 | 74 | 1st OPJHL-E | Lost Conf. Final |
| 2001-02 | 49 | 13 | 33 | 2 | 1 | 136 | 211 | 29 | 9th OPJHL-E | DNQ |
| 2002-03 | 49 | 26 | 17 | 3 | 3 | 216 | 174 | 58 | 5th OPJHL-E | Lost Div. SF |
| 2003-04 | 49 | 16 | 24 | 5 | 4 | 159 | 209 | 41 | 10th OPJHL-E | Lost Div. QF |
| 2004-05 | 49 | 15 | 27 | 2 | 5 | 130 | 172 | 37 | 8th OPJHL-E | Lost Div. QF |
| 2005-06 | 49 | 14 | 29 | 6 | 0 | 144 | 202 | 34 | 8th OPJHL-E | Lost Conf. QF |
| 2006-07 | 49 | 15 | 27 | 5 | 2 | 171 | 218 | 37 | 8th OPJHL-E | Lost Conf. QF |
| 2007-08 | 49 | 20 | 23 | - | 6 | 144 | 165 | 46 | 6th OPJHL-E | Lost Conf. QF |
| 2008-09 | 49 | 32 | 13 | - | 4 | 212 | 149 | 68 | 3rd OJHL-E | Lost Conf. SF |
| 2009-10 | 50 | 26 | 20 | - | 4 | 192 | 173 | 56 | 6th CCHL-E | Lost preliminary |
| 2010-11 | 50 | 30 | 18 | - | 2 | 172 | 151 | 62 | 4th OJHL-E | Lost qualifier |
| 2011-12 | 49 | 25 | 23 | - | 1 | 172 | 174 | 51 | 5th OJHL-E | Lost Division QF |
| 2012-13 | 55 | 25 | 25 | - | 5 | 195 | 194 | 55 | 3rd OJHL-N | Lost Conf. SF |
| 2013-14 | 53 | 19 | 27 | - | 7 | 165 | 203 | 45 | 4th OJHL-N | DNQ |
| 2014-15 | 54 | 18 | 29 | 1 | 6 | 170 | 227 | 43 | 5th OJHL-N | DNQ |
| 2015-16 | 54 | 12 | 36 | 0 | 6 | 122 | 225 | 30 | 6th OJHL-N | DNQ |
| 2016-17 | 54 | 14 | 36 | 0 | 2 | 137 | 257 | 32 | 6 of 6 North; 9 of 11 NE Conf; 19 of 22 OJHL | DNQ |
| 2017-18 | 54 | 11 | 40 | 0 | 3 | 135 | 276 | 25 | 5 of 6 North; 10 of 11 NE Conf; 20 of 22 OJHL | DNQ |
| 2018-19 | 54 | 8 | 42 | 0 | 4 | 130 | 283 | 20 | 6 of 6 East; 11 of 11 SE Conf; 23 of 22 OJHL | DNQ |
| 2019-20 | 54 | 5 | 43 | 1 | 5 | 100 | 253 | 16 | 5 of 5 East; 11 of 11 SE Conf; 22 of 22 OJHL | DNQ |
| 2020-21 | 0 | 0 | 0 | 0 | 0 | 0 | 0 | 0 | Season cancelled | - |
| 2021-22 | 54 | 20 | 28 | 0 | 6 | 153 | 186 | 46 | 5 of 5 East; 8 of 11 SE Conf; 16 of 21 OJHL | DNQ |
| 2022-23 | 54 | 15 | 35 | 1 | 3 | 130 | 201 | 34 | 9 of 11 SE Conf; 20 of 22 OJHL | DNQ |
| 2023-24 | 56 | 26 | 21 | 2 | 7 | 146 | 173 | 61 | 9 of 12 East Conf; 16 of 24 OJHL | DNQ |
| 2024-25 | 56 | 21 | 31 | 1 | 3 | 156 | 197 | 46 | 9 of 12 East Conf; 17 of 24 OJHL | DNQ |
| 2025-26 | 56 | 22 | 27 | 5 | 2 | 164 | 186 | 51 | 8 of 12 East Conf; 16 of 24 OJHL | Lost Conf. SF (0-4) Golden Hawks |

== Ownership ==
The Muskies were formally owned and operated by a group headed by Roger Neilson, former NHL Coach, and his estate. In 2005, they were purchased by a group led by former NHL defenseman Jeff Beukeboom and Uxbridge, Ontario businessman Dave Knapp.

== Clarence Schmalz Cup appearances ==
1964: Hespeler Shamrocks defeated Lindsay Muskies 4-games-to-1
1965: Simcoe Blades defeated Lindsay Muskies 4-games-to-1
1973: Caledonia Corvairs defeated Lindsay Muskies 4-games-to-1
1975: Essex 73's defeated Lindsay Muskies 4-games-to-3
1983: Dunnville Terriers defeated Lindsay Muskies 4-games-to-2

== Notable alumni ==
- Jason Arnott
- Jeff Beukeboom
- Kory Nagy (NHL Referee)
- Mat Robson
- Bryan Young
