= Brampton Capitals =

- City: Brampton, Ontario, Canada
- League: Ontario Junior Hockey League
- Operated: 1984-2012
- Home arena: Brampton Memorial Arena; Nobleton Community Recreation Centre Ice Skating Rink
- Colours: Red, Blue, and White
- General manager: Tony Filice
- Head coach: C.J. Bollers
- Affiliates: Brampton Battalion (OHL)

Franchise history
- 1984-1987: Nobleton Devils
- 1987-1989: Etobicoke Capitals
- 1989-2012: Brampton Capitals
- merged in 2010: Bramalea Blues

The Brampton Capitals were a Junior "A" ice hockey team from Brampton, Ontario, Canada. They were a part of the Ontario Junior Hockey League.

== History ==
The team was formed as Nobleton Capitals in 1984 and later as the Etobicoke Capitals. Since moving to Brampton in 1989, the Capitals have been one of the more dominant teams in the OPJHL. With three league titles, the Capitals have never moved on to the Dudley Hewitt Cup.

In 2000, the Capitals won their second league title, 4-games-to-2 over the Lindsay Muskies. In 2002, Brampton won their third Buckland Trophy 4-games-to-2 against the Wellington Dukes.

The team was decommissioned by the league in March 2012.

== Season-by-season results ==
Season	GP	W	L	T	OTL	GF	GA	P	Results	Playoffs
Nobleton Devils
1984-85	40	5	34	1	-	145	303	11	9th CJBHL	
1985-86	48	9	35	4	-	186	305	22	8th CJBHL	
1986-87	42	17	21	4	-	197	220	38	6th CJBHL	
Etobicoke Capitals
1987-88	44	19	17	8	-	250	228	46	7th CJBHL	
1988-89	42	29	10	3	-	225	154	61	3rd CJBHL	
Brampton Capitals
1989-90	42	12	22	8	-	185	221	32	9th CJBHL	
1990-91	42	24	15	3	-	253	196	51	4th CJBHL	
1991-92	42	25	15	2	-	280	213	52	5th CJBHL	
1992-93	49	33	13	3	-	305	213	71	2nd CJBHL	
1993-94	42	27	15	0	-	263	207	56	3rd OPJHL-W	
1994-95	49	26	20	3	-	287	236	56	5th OPJHL-W	Won League
1995-96	50	33	12	5	-	258	181	71	2nd OPJHL-Me	
1996-97	51	35	14	2	-	280	183	73	2nd OPJHL-Me	
1997-98	51	39	7	1	4	282	163	83	1st OPJHL-Me	
1998-99	51	35	10	6	0	293	185	76	3rd OPJHL-W	
1999-00	49	30	12	4	3	221	174	67	2nd OPJHL-W	Won League
2000-01	49	26	15	7	1	182	143	60	3rd OPJHL-W	
2001-02	49	34	12	3	0	247	159	71	1st OPJHL-W	Won League
2002-03	49	10	36	2	1	208	320	23	10th OPJHL-W	
2003-04	49	13	33	1	2	154	246	29	10th OPJHL-W	
2004-05	49	24	20	4	1	206	164	53	6th OPJHL-W	
2005-06	49	23	21	4	1	186	159	51	7th OPJHL-W	Lost Conf. QF
2006-07	49	39	7	1	2	282	142	81	1st OPJHL-W	Lost Conf. SF
2007-08	49	30	16	-	3	213	176	63	4th OPJHL-W	
2008-09	49	17	24	-	8	199	233	42	7th OJHL-M	
2009-10	56	25	25	-	6	200	243	56	9th OJAHL	DNQ
2010-11	50	22	24	-	4	224	234	48	5th OJHL-W	Lost Qualifier
2011-12	49	6	42	-	1	118	276	13	7th OJHL-W	DNQ

=== Playoffs ===
- 1994 Lost Preliminary

Streetsville Derbys defeated Brampton Capitals 4-games-to-2

- 1995 Won League, won OHA Buckland Cup, won OHF Ruddock Trophy, lost Dudley Hewitt Cup Final

Brampton Capitals defeated Burlington Cougars 4-games-to-1
Brampton Capitals defeated Streetsville Derbys 4-games-to-none
Brampton Capitals defeated Oakville Blades 4-games-to-none
Brampton Capitals defeated Barrie Colts 4-games-to-none OPJHL CHAMPIONS
First in Dudley Hewitt Cup round robin (3-0) BUCKLAND CUP, RUDDOCK TROPHY CHAMPIONS
Thunder Bay Flyers (USHL) defeated Brampton Capitals 6-4 in final

- 1996 Lost final

Brampton Capitals defeated Streetsville Derbys 4-games-to-none
Brampton Capitals defeated Mississauga Chargers 4-games-to-none
Brampton Capitals defeated Bramalea Blues 4-games-to-3
Newmarket 87's defeated Brampton Capitals 4-games-to-2

- 1997 Lost quarter-final

Brampton Capitals defeated St. Michael's Buzzers 4-games-to-2
Bramalea Blues defeated Brampton Capitals 4-games-to-2

- 1998 Lost Preliminary

Hamilton Kiltys defeated Brampton Capitals 4-games-to-1

- 1999 Lost Division Quarter-final

Streetsville Derbys defeated Brampton Capitals 3-games-to-2

- 2000 Won League, lost OHF Ruddock Trophy and Dudley Hewitt Cup

Brampton Capitals defeated Mississauga Chargers 4-games-to-1
Brampton Capitals defeated Streetsville Derbys 4-games-to-none
Brampton Capitals defeated Georgetown Raiders 4-games-to-none
Brampton Capitals defeated Couchiching Terriers 4-games-to-none
Brampton Capitals defeated Lindsay Muskies 4-games-to-2 OPJHL CHAMPIONS
Rayside-Balfour Sabrecats (NOJHL) defeated Brampton Capitals 4-games-to-1

- 2001 Lost Division Final

Brampton Capitals defeated Streetsville Derbys 4-games-to-1
Brampton Capitals defeated Hamilton Kiltys 4-games-to-1
Milton Merchants defeated Brampton Capitals 4-games-to-3

- 2002 Won League, OPJHL withdrew from Dudley Hewitt Cup beforehand

Brampton Capitals defeated Streetsville Derbys 4-games-to-none
Brampton Capitals defeated Georgetown Raiders 4-games-to-none
Brampton Capitals defeated Hamilton Kiltys 4-games-to-2
Brampton Capitals defeated Aurora Tigers 4-games-to-none
Brampton Capitals defeated Wellington Dukes 4-games-to-2 OPJHL CHAMPIONS

- 2003 DNQ
- 2004 DNQ
- 2005 Lost Division Quarter-final

Hamilton Red Wings defeated Brampton Capitals 4-games-to-3

- 2006 Lost Division Quarter-final

Hamilton Red Wings defeated Brampton Capitals 4-games-to-none

- 2007 Lost Division Semi-final

Brampton Capitals defeated Milton Icehawks 4-games-to-1
Georgetown Raiders defeated Brampton Capitals 4-games-to-1

- 2008 Lost Division Semi-final

Brampton Capitals defeated Burlington Cougars 3-games-to-none
Georgetown Raiders defeated Brampton Capitals 4-games-to-1

- 2009 Lost Division Quarter-final

Oakville Blades defeated Brampton Capitals 3-games-to-none

- 2010 DNQ OJAHL Playoffs
- 2011 Lost Qualifier

Hamilton Red Wings defeated Brampton Capitals 2-games-to-1

- 2012 DNQ

== Professional alumni ==
- Mark Giordano
- Tom Kostopoulos
- Kris Newbury
- Jamie Storr
