= 2002 in ice hockey =

The following is a chronicle of events during the year 2002 in ice hockey.

== National Hockey League ==
- Art Ross Trophy as the NHL's leading scorer during the regular season: Jarome Iginla, Calgary Flames
- Hart Memorial Trophy: for the NHL's Most Valuable Player: Jose Theodore, Montreal Canadiens
- Stanley Cup - Detroit Red Wings defeat the Carolina Hurricanes in the 2002 Stanley Cup Finals
- The Columbus Blue Jackets selected Rick Nash with the first pick overall in the 2002 NHL Draft

== Canadian Hockey League ==
- Ontario Hockey League: The Erie Otters captured the J. Ross Robertson Cup.
- Quebec Major Junior Hockey League: The Victoriaville Tigres won the President's Cup (QMJHL) for the first time in franchise history
- Western Hockey League: The Kootenay Ice won the President's Cup (WHL)
- Memorial Cup: The Guelph Storm served as host team for the 2003 Memorial Cup, which was won by the Kootenay Ice.

== Women's hockey ==
- In 2002, at the age of 16, Shannon Szabados became the first female to play in the Western Hockey League. Szabados played in four exhibition games for the Tri-City Americans. On September 22, 2002 she played 20 seconds of a regular season game.

== Season articles ==
2001–02 NHL season	2002–03 NHL season
2001–02 AHL season	2002–03 AHL season

== See also ==
- 2002 in sports
