= Peterborough Stars =

- City: Peterborough, Ontario, Canada
- League: Ontario Junior Hockey League
- Operated: 1950s-2012
- Home arena: Evinrude Community Centre
- Colours: Burgundy, Black, and White
- General manager: Scott Donato
- Head coach: Paul Mattucci
- Affiliates: Peterborough Petes (OHL)

Franchise history
- 19xx-1961: Peterborough Canucks
- 1961-1965: Peterborough Monsens
- 1965-1975: Peterborough Lions
- 1978-1980: Peterborough Oilers
- 1980-1984: Peterborough Lumber Petes
- 1984-1990: Peterborough Roadrunners
- 1990-1997: Peterborough Petes
- 1997-2005: Peterborough Bees
- 2005-2012: Peterborough Stars
- 2012: merged w/ Muskies

The Peterborough Stars were a Junior "A" ice hockey team from Peterborough, Ontario, Canada. They played in the Ontario Junior Hockey League. All players from Peterborough that remained junior eligible had their player cards sent to the Lindsay Muskies as the Stars merged into the Lindsay Muskies.

== History ==
The franchise started in the Ontario Hockey Association's Eastern Junior B Hockey League in 1960 and ended in 2012 when the Stars folded and merged into the Lindsay Muskies.

The Peterborough Lions competed in the 1970 Ontario Winter Games. The Games were meant to represent all four major regions of Jr. B hockey in Ontario. The Lions were crowned Ontario Jr. B Grand Champions by defeating the Toronto Nationals, Chapleau Huskies, Brockville Tikis, St. Marys Lincolns, Owen Sound Greys, St. Catharines Falcons, and the Petrolia Jets 7-1 in the Gold Medal Game.

In 1972, all Ontario junior hockey experienced a reshuffle and the Lions found themselves in the Metro Junior "B" League. The Lions took a 3-year hiatus from 1975 to 1978, returning as the Hall Oil Lumber Kings. Renamed the Roadrunners in 1984, the team went a record 37 games without a win during the 1987-88 season (and 44 games overall going into the 1988-89 season, which ended on October 31, 1988). The franchise stayed with the Metro until it went renegade and left the Ontario Hockey Association in 1989. In 1989, the Peterborough Roadrunners jumped to the Central Junior "B" league, which became the Ontario Provincial Junior A Hockey League in 1993. The Stars were known as the Peterborough Bees from 1997 until 2005. They became the Stars in 2005. They are affiliated with the Peterborough Petes of the Ontario Hockey League.

After over half of a century of hockey, the Stars shutdown operation by merging with the Lindsay Muskies in the Spring of 2012.

== Season-by-season results ==
Season	GP	W	L	T	OTL	GF	GA	P	Results	Playoffs
1960-61	20	13	2	5	-	--	--	31	1st EJBHL	Won League
1961-62	Statistics Not Available									
1962-63	20	12	8	0	-	111	71	24	2nd EJBHL	
1963-64	30	14	13	3	-	119	117	31	2nd EJBHL	
1964-65	25	10	14	1	-	--	--	21	2nd EJBHL	
1965-66	27	11	13	3	-	93	108	31	3rd EJBHL	
1966-67	Statistics Not Available									
1967-68	32	18	11	3	-	176	137	39	2nd EJBHL	
1968-69	30	19	7	4	-	--	--	40	2nd EJBHL	
1969-70	30	16	11	3	-	171	126	35	3rd EJBHL	
1970-71	30	26	4	0	-	228	75	52	1st EJBHL	Won League
1971-72	Statistics Not Available									
1972-73	34	26	6	2	-	187	107	54	1st Metro B	
1973-74	44	22	19	3	-	212	191	47	7th Metro B	
1974-75	38	19	15	4	-	182	181	42	8th Metro B	
1975-78	Did not participate									
1978-79	44	18	19	7	-	266	247	43	9th Metro B	DNQ
1979-80	42	20	11	11	-	219	179	51	4th Metro B	
1980-81	40	18	14	8	-	205	179	44	6th Metro B	
1981-82	35	22	11	2	-	187	146	46	3rd Metro B	
1982-83	36	11	15	10	-	161	171	32	8th Metro B	
1983-84	42	16	21	5	-	201	207	37	8th Metro B	
1984-85	36	15	14	7	-	179	166	37	7th Metro B	
1985-86	37	17	18	2	-	211	240	36	6th Metro B	Lost quarter-final
1986-87	37	11	22	4	-	184	240	26	9th Metro B	DNQ
1987-88	37	0	35	2	-	81	352	2	12th Metro B	DNQ
1988-89	39	7	30	2	-	157	271	16	11th Metro B	
1989-90	42	12	23	7	-	230	264	31	12th CJBHL	
1990-91	42	4	37	1	-	154	303	9	14th CJBHL	
1991-92	42	17	20	5	-	175	205	39	11th CJBHL	
1992-93	48	27	16	5	-	278	234	61	7th CJBHL	
1993-94	40	16	22	2	-	204	223	34	7th OPJHL-E	
1994-95	48	14	33	1	-	209	304	30	8th OPJHL-E	
1995-96	50	14	35	1	-	185	254	31	5th OPJHL-R	
1996-97	51	29	19	3	-	219	182	64	2nd OPJHL-R	
1997-98	51	29	18	4	0	254	176	62	1st OPJHL-R	
1998-99	51	15	26	7	3	169	214	40	12th OPJHL-E	
1999-00	49	17	26	3	3	184	202	40	8th OPJHL-E	
2000-01	49	23	16	7	3	203	199	56	5th OPJHL-E	
2001-02	49	23	20	5	1	195	199	52	5th OPJHL-E	
2002-03	49	15	31	1	2	133	212	33	8th OPJHL-E	
2003-04	49	19	27	3	0	158	222	41	8th OPJHL-E	
2004-05	49	16	28	3	2	161	215	37	7th OPJHL-E	
2005-06	49	25	19	3	2	203	203	55	4th OPJHL-E	Lost Conf. QF
2006-07	49	20	25	3	1	173	208	44	5th OPJHL-E	Lost Conf. QF
2007-08	49	29	14	-	7	161	133	65	4th OPJHL-E	Lost quarter final
2008-09	49	37	11	-	1	216	138	75	2nd OJHL-R	Lost Div. Final
2009-10	50	26	18	-	6	175	182	58	5th CCHL-E	Lost quarter-final
2010-11	50	33	12	-	5	202	153	71	3rd OJHL-E	Lost Round of 16
2011-12	49	8	37	-	4	105	227	20	7th OJHL-E	DNQ

== Notable alumni ==
- Zac Bierk
- Jassen Cullimore
- Tie Domi
- Mike Fisher
- Bob Gainey
- Aaron Gavey
- Kerry Huffman
- Jeff Larmer
- Steve Larmer
- Darren McCarty
- Dave Roche
- Glen Seabrooke
- Cory Stillman
- Steve Webb
