= Ajax Attack =

Ice hockey team from Canada

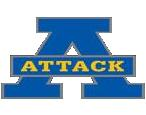
- City: Ajax, Ontario, Canada
- League: Ontario Junior Hockey League; Central Ontario Junior C Hockey League
- Operated: 1986-2010
- Home arena: Ajax Community Centre
- Colours: Blue, Yellow, and White
- General manager: Robert Toffoli
- Head coach: Carey Durant

Franchise history
- 1986-2005: Ajax Axemen
- 2005-2010: Ajax Attack
- 2010: Merged w/ Pickering Panthers

The Ajax Attack were a Junior "A" ice hockey team from Ajax, Ontario, Canada. They were a part of the Central Canadian Hockey League. They used to be known as the Axemen.

== History ==
The team originated as a member of the Central Junior C Hockey League in 1986. In 1991 they made the jump to the Central Junior "B" league, despite limited success in the Central Junior "C" league, and stayed with the league in 1993 when it became the OPJHL. Since 1987, the Attack have only had one winning season and two .500 records.

After the 2004-05 season, one of the worst seasons in OPJHL history, the Axemen changed their name to the Attack. Despite their name change, their woes continued in 2005-06 finishing out of the playoffs in a league that allows 32 teams into their playoffs every year. In 2006-07, the Attack managed to make the playoffs with a wildcard spot, but bowed out in the first round. In 07/08 the Attack failed to make the post season posting a 12-34-3 and again it was very frustrating year for the franchise.

In the Summer of 2010, the Attack merged with the Pickering Panthers and left Ajax.

== Season-by-season results ==
Season	GP	W	L	T	OTL	GF	GA	P	Results	Playoffs
1987-88	32	12	16	4	-	148	182	28	6th COJCHL	
1988-89	40	20	15	5	-	188	163	45	7th COJCHL	
1989-90	36	16	17	3	-	156	170	35	4th COJCHL	
1990-91	36	11	23	2	-	135	188	24	6th COJCHL	
1991-92	42	12	28	2	-	181	243	26	13th CJBHL	
1992-93	48	9	33	6	-	203	275	26	13th CJBHL	
1993-94	40	17	17	6	-	183	199	40	5th OPJHL-E	
1994-95	48	4	43	1	-	131	343	12	9th OPJHL-E	
1995-96	49	12	32	5	-	172	263	30	6th OPJHL-R	
1996-97	51	21	28	2	-	212	258	45	3rd OPJHL-R	
1997-98	50	13	35	2	0	190	282	28	5th OPJHL-R	
1998-99	51	17	27	6	1	153	233	41	10th OPJHL-E	
1999-00	49	16	26	6	1	159	216	39	6th OPJHL-E	
2000-01	49	23	23	3	0	206	202	49	7th OPJHL-E	
2001-02	49	7	30	6	6	163	240	26	9th OPJHL-S	
2002-03	49	12	31	3	3	142	202	30	8th OPJHL-S	
2003-04	49	13	32	2	2	154	250	30	9th OPJHL-S	
2004-05	49	2	44	1	2	111	285	7	9th OPJHL-S	
2005-06	49	5	41	0	3	124	333	13	9th OPJHL-S	DNQ
2006-07	49	13	31	3	2	144	249	31	7th OPJHL-S	Lost Div. QF
2007-08	49	12	34	-	3	142	268	27	8th OPJHL-S	
2008-09	49	25	24	-	0	216	229	50	5th OJHL-R	
2009-10	50	24	25	-	1	208	235	49	8th CCHL-E	Lost preliminary

== Notable alumni ==
- Brian Elliott
- Matt Johnson
- Mike Kostka
- Brett McConnachie
- Tyler Mcgregor
