= Vaughan Vipers =

- City: Vaughan, Ontario, Canada
- League: Ontario Junior Hockey League
- Operated: 1991–2012
- Home arena: Al Palladini Community Centre
- Colours: Purple, Black and White
- General manager: Jason Fortier
- Head coach: Jason Fortier
- Affiliates: Vaughan Kings (GTHL)

Franchise history
- 1991–1996: Royal York Rangers
- 1996–2012: Vaughan Vipers

The Vaughan Vipers were a Junior "A" ice hockey team from Vaughan, Ontario, Canada. They were a part of the Ontario Junior Hockey League.

== History ==
In 1991, the expansion Royal York Rangers joined the Central Jr. B league, which became the Ontario Provincial league. In 1996, the team moved to become the Vaughan Vipers. In the first season in 1996–97, the Vipers failed to make the playoffs and were the fourth-worst team. After managing only 7 wins out of a 51-game schedule, the Vipers finished with only 18 points, and the Vipers finished out of playoff contention for the third-consecutive year. The 1999–00 season would bring changes, and the Vipers produced talent with some local players, who were discarded from major junior hockey, especially the Ontario Hockey League. The records from the previous years were identical, but in different categories. Vaughan made the post-season for the first time in their short history, especially defeating the Pickering Panthers in four games and the Markham Waxers in 5 games. The Thornhill Rattlers were no match for the Vipers and lost the series in 4 games. The following seasons, the Vipers began to sink to the bottom of the standings and were fortunate to qualify for the playoffs, only to exit the first round. The Vipers would not advance to another playoff round until 2007.

Vaughan's best season came in 2007–08, when the team boosted a 41–4–4 record, despite finishing 2nd place in the OPJHL's South Conference behind the dominant St. Michael's Buzzers. The Vipers received a bye to the next round of the playoffs, but lost the second round series to the Markham Waxers in four games.

In their final 2011–12 season, the Vipers finished 2nd behind the St. Michael's Buzzers, but would lose a heart-breaking series to the Toronto Lakeshore Patriots in 7 games. Marcus Hinds scored the final goal in Vaughan Vipers history just over 11 minutes into the third period in a 4–2 loss to Toronto at the Al Palladini Community Centre in front of 323 fans.

In March 2012, the Vipers withdrew their membership from the OJHL.

== Season-by-season results ==
Season	GP	W	L	T	OTL	GF	GA	P	Results	Playoffs
1991–92	42	2	40	0	-	83	349	4	16th CJBHL	
1992–93	49	6	42	1	-	152	347	17	17th CJBHL	
1993–94	42	1	40	1	-	124	345	3	8th OPJHL-W	
1994–95	49	11	33	5	-	183	312	29	7th OPJHL-W	
1995–96	50	9	39	2	-	181	364	21	6th OPJHL-Me	
1996–97	51	16	33	2	-	179	272	35	6th OPJHL-Me	
1997–98	51	7	40	2	2	192	354	18	5th OPJHL-Me	
1998–99	51	9	38	2	2	198	346	22	11th OPJHL-W	
1999-00	49	36	7	3	3	221	125	78	1st OPJHL-S	
2000–01	49	19	23	5	2	169	173	45	8th OPJHL-S	
2001–02	49	19	25	3	2	173	196	43	7th OPJHL-S	
2002–03	49	26	17	2	4	205	204	58	4th OPJHL-S	
2003–04	49	18	29	1	1	161	200	38	7th OPJHL-S	
2004–05	49	20	21	4	4	157	177	48	6th OPJHL-S	
2005–06	49	22	19	5	3	193	180	52	6th OPJHL-S	Lost Conf. QF
2006–07	49	32	7	7	3	192	108	74	1st OPJHL-S	Lost Conf. SF
2007–08	49	41	4	-	4	256	127	86	2nd OPJHL-S	
2008–09	49	33	13	-	3	242	152	69	4th OJHL-M	
2009–10	56	29	17	-	10	217	183	68	8th OJAHL	Lost quarter-final
2010–11	50	34	13	-	3	233	145	71	1st OJHL-S	Lost quarter-final
2011–12	49	29	18	-	2	196	153	60	2nd OJHL-S	Lost Division SF

== Notable alumni ==
- Bruce Driver
- Dave Reid
- Trevor Daley
- Matthew Corrente
- Justin Peters
- Terry Doumkos
- Evan Fong
