= Collingwood Blues (1988–2011) =

- City: Collingwood, Ontario, Canada
- League: Ontario Junior Hockey League
- Operated: 1988-2011
- Home arena: Eddie Bush Memorial Arena
- Colours: Red, Black, and White
- General manager: Darrell Mussell
- Head coach: Myles McCauley
- Affiliates: Owen Sound Attack (OHL); Stayner Siskins (GMOHL)

Franchise history
- 1948-1955: Collingwood Greenshirts
- 1955-19xx: Collingwood Cobras
- 19xx-1969: Collingwood Legionnaires
- 1969-1977: Collingwood Blues
- 1977-1979: Collingwood Glassmen
- 1979-1987: Collingwood Shipbuilders
- 1988-2010: Collingwood Blues
- 2010-2011: Collingwood Blackhawks

The Collingwood Blues were a Junior "A" ice hockey team from Collingwood, Ontario, Canada. They were a part of the Ontario Junior A Hockey League and earlier the Central Junior B Hockey League.

== History ==
Founded as a Jr ‘B’ team in 1948-49, the Greenshirts dropped down to Jr ‘C’ in 1949-50, although they played in a mixed league of B and C teams during the regular season. Collingwood junior hockey excellence can be traced back as far as 1950 where the town's Junior "C" team won four straight Clarence Schmalz Cups as All-Ontario Junior "C" Champions. Subsequently, they were named the OHA’s Jr ‘C’ Team of the Century.

The Blues played in the Georgia Bay Jr.C league until 1969, when they joined the Central Ontario Jr.B league. They won the Central Junior B Hockey League playoff championship in 1970 and 1971. In 1972, after transferring to the Mid-Ontario Junior B League, they won their league title. They won that title again in 1975-76 and advanced through the Ontario playdowns all the way to the Sutherland Cup provincial final against the St. Marys Lincolns of the Western Junior B Hockey League. St. Marys won the series 4-3, handing Collingwood their only home defeat of the season, in game 7 of the finals.

The Blues played in the Southern Ontario Junior A Hockey League in 1976-77 and finished third out of four teams. In 1977, the Collingwood Blues informed the SOJHL that they were no longer interested in Junior A hockey and left the league to join the local Junior C loop. The folding of the Blues allowed for the folding of the SOJHL. The next season the team was called the Glassmen and compete at the Junior C level. In 1979, the team changed their name to the Shipbuilders and jumped to the Major Intermediate A Hockey League. The Shipbuilder were 1982-83 Major Int. "A" Champions and second place in the province to a team from Timmins, Ontario. In 1983, the league was promoted to Senior "A". The team left the league in 1987 and went on hiatus. In their final Senior season they dropped down to the Georgian Bay Senior A Hockey League. They finished second in the regular season behind the Durham Huskies, but they won the league playoffs and the OHA Senior "A" title 4-games-to-2 against the Dunnville Mudcats of the Southern Ontario league.

In 1988, the Blues were voted back into the Central Junior B Hockey League. In 1993, the league was promoted to Junior A status and the Blues remained a member of that league until 2011.

In 2010, the Blues changed their name to the Blackhawks. On April 3, 2011, the League announced that the franchise had ceased operations.

== Season-by-season results ==
=== Original junior team ===
Season	GP	W	L	T	OTL	GF	GA	P	Results	Playoffs
1969-70	40	18	18	4	-	183	189	40	3rd CJBHL	Won League
1970-71	40	24	15	1	-	195	138	51	2nd CJBHL	Won League
1971-72	40	22	13	5	-	226	155	49	3rd MOJBHL	
1972-73	40	28	9	3	-	217	139	59	1st MOJBHL	Lost final
1973-74	40	26	12	2	-	217	143	54	2nd MOJBHL	Lost semi-final
1974-75	39	27	8	4	-	223	180	58	1st MOJBHL	Lost final
1975-76	36	25	7	4	-	260	128	54	1st MOJBHL	Won League, lost SC Final
1976-77	34	10	18	6	-	156	176	26	3rd SOJAHL	Lost final
1977-78	32	14	14	4	-	190	172	32	5th MOJCHL	Lost semi-final
1978-79	34	21	8	5	-	--	--	47	2nd MOJCHL	Lost semi-final

=== The Shipbuilders ===
Season	GP	W	L	T	OTL	GF	GA	P	Results	Playoffs
1978-79	37	30	7	0	-	256	112	60	1st GBIAHL	
1979-80	36	23	12	1	-	194	140	47	2nd GBIAHL	
1980-81	36	25	10	1	-	223	158	51	2nd OHA Int. A	
1981-82	36	24	11	1	-	236	182	49	2nd OHA Int. A	
1982-83	29	24	5	0	-	228	129	48	1st OHA Int. A	Won League
1983-84	38	20	17	1	-	238	221	41	7th OHA Sr. A	
1984-85	40	23	16	1	-	206	194	47	4th OHA Sr. A	
1985-86	36	15	21	0	-	144	205	30	6th OHA Sr. A	
1986-87	24	18	6	0	-	193	120	36	2nd GBSAHL	Won League, won OHA title

=== The second junior team ===
Season	GP	W	L	T	OTL	GF	GA	P	Results	Playoffs
1988-89	42	5	34	3	-	166	353	13	15th CJBHL	
1989-90	42	13	24	5	-	201	257	31	10th CJBHL	
1990-91	42	15	22	5	-	170	209	35	11th CJBHL	
1991-92	42	7	28	7	-	147	247	21	14th CJBHL	
1992-93	48	10	36	2	-	162	355	23	15th CJBHL	
1993-94	40	10	29	1	-	127	223	22	8th OPJHL-E	
1994-95	48	21	24	3	-	210	223	46	5th OPJHL-E	
1995-96	49	28	16	5	-	237	193	61	2nd OPJHL-P	
1996-97	51	28	18	5	-	249	206	62	2nd OPJHL-P	
1997-98	51	35	12	3	1	263	156	74	1st OPJHL-P	
1998-99	51	41	8	1	1	309	126	84	1st OPJHL-C	
1999-00	47	26	13	5	3	243	148	60	3rd OPJHL-N	
2000-01	49	27	19	2	1	224	142	57	4th OPJHL-N	
2001-02	49	23	21	4	1	191	181	51	6th OPJHL-N	
2002-03	49	23	25	0	1	204	176	47	4th OPJHL-N	
2003-04	49	22	20	3	4	174	216	51	4th OPJHL-N	
2004-05	49	13	32	4	0	158	217	30	5th OPJHL-N	Lost Div. SF
2005-06	48	22	19	6	1	171	172	51	4th OPJHL-N	Lost Div. SF
2006-07	48	22	19	4	3	157	169	51	3rd OPJHL-N	Lost Div. SF
2007-08	49	10	36	-	3	107	220	23	8th OPJHL-N	
2008-09	49	22	23	-	4	169	183	48	6th OJHL-P	
2009-10	56	14	40	-	2	152	287	30	14th OJAHL	DNQ
2010-11	50	5	43	-	2	104	333	12	7th OJHL-N	DNQ

=== Playoffs ===
SOJHL Years

- 1977 Lost final

Collingwood Blues defeated Hamilton Mountain A's 4-games-to-2
Guelph Platers defeated Collingwood Blues 4-games-to-none

OPJHL Years

== Sutherland Cup appearances ==
1976: St. Marys Lincolns defeated Collingwood Blues 4-games-to-3

== Notable alumni ==
- Aaron Downey
- Kevin Colley
- Curtis Sanford
- Kerry Fraser
- Matt Beleskey
