= Stouffville Spirit =

Hockey team from Ontario, Canada

- City: Whitchurch–Stouffville, Ontario, Canada
- League: Ontario Junior Hockey League
- Founded: 1995
- Home arena: Stouffville Arena
- Colours: Red, Black, and White
- General manager: Kenny Burrows
- Head coach: T.J. Hill
- Media: WhiStle Radio 102.9 FM
- Affiliates: Uxbridge Bruins (COJCHL)

Franchise history
- 1995-1996: Stouffville Clippers
- 1996-Present: Stouffville Spirit

The Stouffville Spirit are a Junior "A" ice hockey team from Whitchurch–Stouffville, Ontario, Canada. The Stouffville Spirit are members of the Ontario Junior Hockey League of the Ontario Hockey Association.

== History ==
From 1970 until 1984, the Stouffville Clippers were members of the Central Junior C Hockey League and played at the old Stouffville Arena built in 1949. From 1984 until 1995, the team was on a long hiatus. The Clippers were brought back in 1995 playing at the current Stouffville Arena (built 1985), changed their name to the Spirit a season later, and have been members of the OPJHL ever since.

Junior hockey has a long and storied history in Stouffville. In the first half of the 20th Century it had two ice rinks for hockey, Maple Leaf Rink (1901) and Clayton Baker Arena at what is now Memorial Park (1926).

The 1947 Stouffville Red Wings, which played at Clayton Baker Arena, won an OHA championship and played until 1949 in the OHA Senior B when it was renamed the Clippers. Baker Arena was dismantled for the old Stouffville Arena at Memorial Park and reused in Cambray, Ontario. Junior hockey was popular in Stouffville through the 1960s, right into the early 1980s.

The Spirit was founded in 1995. George Stavro, who was granted the franchise by the Ontario Hockey Association, was the team's first coach and general manager. Junior hockey hadn't been played in Stouffville since 1984, when the OHA's junior C Stouffville Clippers folded.

But Stavro didn't last a full season in the Provincial Junior A Hockey League.

In mid-season, he sold the franchise to Stouffville businessman Ed Hakonson, who had tried to obtain a junior A franchise for Stouffville earlier in the '90s. Former Stouffville minor official Wally Crowder was named general manager, and Steve Sedore of Georgina head coach.

The Spirit struggled on and off the ice over the first three seasons. Sedore was replaced as coach by Stouffville minor hockey grad Dan Larmer. Larmer played junior hockey in southern Ontario and college hockey at Mercyhurst in Pennsylvania, before a brief pro career.

A move of home games at the Whitchurch-Stouffville Recreation Complex, from Saturday nights to Thursdays, improved attendance. But the Spirit didn't make the playoffs in its first three seasons.

A new regime took over Spirit hockey operations in 1998. New Spirit general manager Dieter Schmidt had been manager and head coach Brian Perrin was associate coach with the successful Newmarket Hurricanes' organization, before accepting promotions in Stouffville.

Players have advanced to college and major junior hockey since Year 1 of the Spirit.

Hakonson sold shares in the hockey club to Stouffville-area resident Zeev Werek and Larry Goldberg in 1999, then sold the rest of the team to Werek and Goldberg a year later. David Laren joined the Spirit in 2002 as an equal partner. Goldberg left the group in 2005.

Schmidt retired as GM after the 2000–2001 season. His replacement is Stouffville native Ken Burrows, who in 10 years with the Spirit has been vice-president of hockey, assistant coach and scout.

A volunteer board of directors oversees the operation of the Spirit.

The Spirit is proud to be affiliated with the Whitchurch-Stouffville Minor Hockey Association and the Uxbridge Bruins Junior C Hockey Club.

== Season-by-season results ==
1995 - 2020 History - is hidden click to
Season	GP	W	L	T	OTL	GF	GA	P	Results	Playoffs
1995-96	50	13	35	2	-	182	288	30	5th OPJHL-P	
1996-97	50	8	41	1	-	167	295	19	5th OPJHL-P	
1997-98	51	16	32	2	1	194	280	35	6th OPJHL-P	
1998-99	51	23	27	0	1	215	234	47	8th OPJHL-C	
1999-00	49	24	23	2	0	195	190	50	5th OPJHL-N	
2000-01	49	35	9	3	2	260	159	75	3rd OPJHL-N	
2001-02	49	24	18	5	2	207	183	55	4th OPJHL-N	
2002-03	49	29	18	2	0	241	154	60	3rd OPJHL-N	
2003-04	49	27	21	1	0	201	178	55	3rd OPJHL-N	
2004-05	49	25	20	3	1	195	157	54	3rd OPJHL-N	
2005-06	49	26	10	9	4	172	138	65	3rd OPJHL-N	Lost final
2006-07	49	28	16	3	2	199	164	61	2nd OPJHL-N	Lost Conf. Finals
2007-08	49	31	13	-	5	245	166	67	4th OPJHL-N	
2008-09	53	13	34	-	6	165	246	32	8th OJHL-C	
2009-10	50	28	19	-	3	153	140	59	4th CCHL-E	Lost preliminary
2010-11	50	33	11	-	6	262	154	72	3rd OJHL-N	Lost semi-final
2011-12	49	32	8	-	9	217	152	73	2nd OJHL-N	Won League
2012-13	55	18	31	-	6	150	219	42	4th OJHL-N	DNQ
2013-14	53	19	30	-	4	147	191	42	5th OJHL-N	DNQ
2014-15	-	-	-	-	-	-	-	-	-	-
2015-16	54	24	24	3	3	185	192	54	4th of 6 North Div; 9th of 11 NE Conf; 11th of 22 OJHL	DNQ
2016-17	54	28	20	3	3	198	168	62	2nd of 6 North Div; 7th of 11 NE Conf; 16th of 22 OJHL	Won Conf. Quarters, 4-2 (Royals); Lost Conf. Semifinals, 0-4 (Golden Hawks)
2017-18	54	8	43	2	1	116	255	19	6th of 6 North Div; 11th of 11 NE Conf; 21st of 22 OJHL	DNQ
2018-19	54	12	37	1	4	131	225	29	5th of 5 North Div; 11th of 11 NE Conf; 21st of 22 OJHL	DNQ
2019-20	54	27	20	4	3	172	171	61	3rd of 5 North Div; 6th of 11 NE Conf; 11th of 22 OJHL	Playoffs Interrupted

2020 - current History
2020-21	-	-	-	-	-	-	-	-	-	Season Cancelled
2021-22	54	14	35	-	2	126	217	33	4th of 5 North Div; 18th of 21 OJHL	Lost Conf. Quarterfinals, 0-2 (Panthers)
2022-23	54	18	28	-	7	164	217	44	8th of 10 North/West Div; 15th of 21 OJHL	Lost Conf. Quarterfinals, 0-4 (Blues)
2023-24	56	29	20	2	5	204	164	85	8th of 12 East Conf; 14st of 24 OJHL	Lost Conf. Quarters, 0-4 (Golden Hawks)
2024-25	56	33	19	0	4	217	156	70	4th of 12 East Conf; 8th of 24 OJHL	Won Conf. Quarters, 4-0 (Dukes); Lost Conf Semifinals 1-4 (Golden Hawks)

=== Playoffs ===
- 1996 DNQ
- 1997 DNQ
- 1998 DNQ
- 1999 Lost Division Quarter-final

Collingwood Blues defeated Stouffville Spirit 3-games-to-none

- 2000 Lost division final

Stouffville Spirit defeated Aurora Tigers 4-games-to-none
Stouffville Spirit defeated Newmarket Hurricanes 4-games-to-2
Couchiching Terriers defeated Stouffville Spirit 4-games-to-none

- 2001 Lost Division Semi-final

Stouffville Spirit defeated Parry Sound Shamrocks 4-games-to-none
Couchiching Terriers defeated Stouffville Spirit 4-games-to-2

- 2002 Lost Division Quarter-final

Collingwood Blues defeated Stouffville Spirit 4-games-to-3

- 2003 Lost division final

Stouffville Spirit defeated Couchiching Terriers 4-games-to-none
Stouffville Spirit defeated Newmarket Hurricanes 4-games-to-3
Aurora Tigers defeated Stouffville Spirit 4-games-to-2

- 2004 Lost Division Semi-final

Stouffville Spirit defeated Thornhill Rattlers 4-games-to-2
Newmarket Hurricanes defeated Stouffville Spirit 4-games-to-1

- 2005 Lost Division Semi-final

Stouffville Spirit defeated Couchiching Terriers 4-games-to-2
Newmarket Hurricanes defeated Stouffville Spirit 4-games-to-2

- 2006 Lost final

Stouffville Spirit defeated Seguin Bruins 4-games-to-2
Stouffville Spirit defeated Newmarket Hurricanes 4-games-to-2
Stouffville Spirit defeated Aurora Tigers 4-games-to-2
Stouffville Spirit defeated Oakville Blades 4-games-to-3
St. Michael's Buzzers defeated Stouffville Spirit 4-games-to-2

- 2007 Lost division final

Stouffville Spirit defeated Cobourg Cougars 4-games-to-none
Stouffville Spirit defeated Collingwood Blues 4-games-to-none
Aurora Tigers defeated Stouffville Spirit 4-games-to-1

- 2008 Lost division final

Stouffville Spirit defeated Couchiching Terriers 3-games-to-none
Stouffville Spirit defeated Huntsville Otters 4-games-to-3
Aurora Tigers defeated Stouffville Spirit 4-games-to-1

- 2009 Lost Division Quarter-final

Wellington Dukes defeated Stouffville Spirit 4-games-to-none

- 2010 Lost CCHL Preliminary

Peterborough Stars defeated Stouffville Spirit 4-games-to-none

- 2011 Lost semi-final

Stouffville Spirit defeated Markham Waxers 4-games-to-2
Stouffville Spirit defeated Newmarket Hurricanes 4-games-to-3
Wellington Dukes defeated Stouffville Spirit 4-games-to-2

== Retired Numbers ==
26 - Randy Johnston (2008)

== Notable alumni ==
- Will Acton
- Darren Archibald
- Drake Caggiula
- Michael Carcone
- Trevor Carrick
- Simon Gysbers
- Isaak Phillips
- Christopher Tanev
- Ethan Werek
