= Streetsville Derbys =

- City: Streetsville, Ontario, Canada; Mississauga, Ontario, Canada; Rexdale, Toronto, Ontario, Canada
- League: Ontario Junior Hockey League; Central Canadian Hockey League; Central Ontario Junior B Hockey League; Mid-Ontario Junior B Hockey League; Suburban Junior C Hockey League
- Founded: 1967
- Operated: 1967–2011; 2024–current
- Home arena: Vic Johnston Community Centre
- Colours: Orange, black, and white
- General manager: Nico Fekete
- Head coach: Todd McKee
- Affiliates: Uxbridge Bruins (COJCHL)

Franchise history
- 1967–1992: Streetsville Derbys
- 1992–1993: Mississauga Derbys
- 2011–2011: Cobourg Cougars (merged with)
- 2024–present: Streetsville Derbys

The Streetsville Derbys are a junior "C" ice hockey team from Streetsville, Ontario, Canada. They are a part of the Provincial Junior Hockey League assigned to the South Conference and in the Bloomfield Division. The Derbys joined the PJHL as an expansion franchise for the 2024–25 season.

The Derbys were also a junior "A" ice hockey team and part of the Ontario Junior Hockey League in 2011 until they merged into the Cobourg Cougars.

== History ==
The Derbys began in 1967 as part of the Suburban Jr. C league. In 1970, they joined the new Mid-Ontario Jr. B league, and the following season the team joined the Central Jr. B league. The team was briefly renamed the Mississauga Derbys for the 1992–93 season. Streetsville claimed the Central Junior "B" Championship in 1976, 1977, 1978, 1979, 1980, 1983, 1984 and 1986, as well as the 1979 Sutherland Cup as All-Ontario Champions. The Derbys were the hosts of the Royal Bank Cup 2006, the National Junior "A" Championship. At the end of the 2007 season, it was announced that the Derbys would be moving to a new location, Westwood Arena in Rexdale, Ontario.

In 1986, the Ontario Hockey Association, concerned with growing violence in hockey, suspended the Streetsville Derbys and the Brantford Classics from playing in the 1986–87 season. The suspension of the Derbys had to do with a stick-swinging incident in the final game of the league quarter-final against the Nobleton Devils. A Nobleton player was struck in the back of the head with a two-hand slash, which also struck a linesman and cut his eyelid.

The Streetsville Derbys were chosen by the Canadian Junior A Hockey League to host the 2006 Royal Bank Cup. Instead of playing the games in a local arena, the Derbys' ownership elected to use the larger, neighbouring Powerade Centre in the rival town of Brampton, Ontario. Despite the team playing well at the tournament, the execution of the tournament by team management was notoriously bad, and was criticized by Hockey Canada officials at the next AGM as well as the guest teams. As they moved the event to the rival town of Brampton, most fans stayed home. Streetsville finished first in the round robin (3-1), only to bow out with a 2–1 loss to the Yorkton Terriers of the Saskatchewan Junior Hockey League in the semi-final.

In March 2011, the Streetsville Derbys merged into the Cobourg Cougars and ceased to exist as members of the OJHL.

In the 2018 hockey season, the Streetsville Hockey League unveiled their newly revived divisional Derbys "Select" teams to compete in the Mississauga Hockey League.

In April 2024, the PJHL announced that they had accepted the Streetsville Derbys as an expansion team; this marked the return of Streetsville to junior-level hockey.

== Season-by-season results ==
Season	GP	W	L	T	OTL	GF	GA	P	Results	Playoffs
1967-68	30	17	11	2	-	109	121	36	5th of 9 SubJCHL	Lost semi-final, 3-0-1 (Raiders)
1968-69	36	8	26	2	-	152	225	18	9th of 10 SubJCHL	DNQ
1969-70	34	15	14	5	-	172	132	35	5th of 9 SubJCHL	
1970-71	34	16	13	5	-	174	172	37	5th MOJBHL	
1971-72	42	13	21	8	-	178	215	34	7th CJBHL	
1972-73	42	28	9	5	-	258	184	61	2nd CJBHL	
1973-74	42	25	12	2	-	223	189	55	4th CJBHL	Lost semi-final 1-4 (Blades)
1974-75	40	17	17	4	-	211	186	38	4th CJBHL	Won quarter-final 4-1 (Merchants); Lost semi-final 3-4 (Mohawks)
1975-76	42	15	18	3	-	177	177	33	4th CJBHL	Won quarter-final 4-2 (Cougars) semi-final finished 1st of 3 in round robin Won League 4-2 (Chevys); Won SC quarter-final 4-3 (Canucks); Lost SC semi-final 2-4 (Lincolns)
1976-77	42	24	13	5	-	239	179	53	4th CJBHL	Won quarter-final 3-1 (Cougars); Won semi-final 4-1 (Beehives); Won League 4-0 (Flyers); Won SC quarter-final 4-2 (Canucks); Lost SC semi-final 1-4 (Falcons); Lost SC final 2-4 (Cullitons)
1977-78	42	35	4	3	-	360	142	73	1st CJBHL	Won semi-final 4-0 (Gemini); Won League 4-0 (Flyers); Won SC quarter-final 4-3 (Falcons); Won SC semi-final 4-0 (Royals); Lost SC final 4-2 (Cullitons)
1978-79	44	40	4	0	-	354	120	80	1st CJBHL	Won quarter-final 4-0 (Chevys); Won semi-final 4-2 (Cougars); Won League 4-1 (Blades); Won SC semi-final 4-1 (Legionnaires); Won SC final 4-0 (Falcons)
1979-80	44	38	5	1	-	318	133	77	1st CJBHL	Won quarter-final (Warriors); Won semi final (Beehives); Won League (Cougars); Lost SC semi-final 3-4 (Bobcats)
1980-81	44	17	22	5	-	222	268	39	7th CJBHL	Lost quarter-final 3-4 (Dynes)
1981-82	40	27	9	4	-	272	159	58	3rd CJBHL	Won quarter-final 4-0 (Colts); Won semi-final 4-3 (Cougars); Lost final 0-4 (Blades)
1982-83	42	31	8	3	-	330	156	65	1st CJBHL	Won quarter-final 4-0 (Sabres); Won semi-final 4-0 (Colts); Won League 4-0 (Gemini); Lost SC semi-final 2-4 (Crusaders)
1983-84	40	33	5	2	-	283	127	68	1st CJBHL	Won quarter-final 4-1 (Cougars); Won div. semi-final 4-1 (Monarchs); Won League; Lost SC Final 3-4 (Siskins)
1984-85	40	22	12	6	-	200	178	50	2nd CJBHL	Won div. quarter-final 4-1 (Steamers); Won div. semi-final 4-1 (Blades); Lost div. final 3-4 (Colts)
1985-86	48	34	11	3	-	325	226	71	1st CJBHL	Won quarter-final 4-2 (Devils); Won semi-final 4-2 (Cougars); Won League; Lost SC final 0-4 (Cullitons)
1986-87	Disciplinary Suspension									
1987-88	44	26	14	4	-	256	229	56	5th CJBHL	Won div. quarter-final 4-2 (Monarchs); Won div. semi-final 4-3 (Blades); Lost div. final 2-4 (Cougars)
1988-89	42	20	15	7	-	222	199	47	6th CJBHL	Won div. quarter-final 4-0 (Monarchs); Won div. semi-final 4-2 (Cougars); Lost div. final 2-4 (Capitals)
1989-90	42	23	11	8	-	240	183	54	4th CJBHL	Won div. quarter-final 4-2 (Raiders); Won div. semi-final 4-3 (Capitals); Lost div. final 1-4 (Blades)
1990-91	42	20	17	5	-	226	223	45	8th CJBHL	Won div. quarter-final 3-0 (Cougars); Lost div. semi-final 0-4 (Blades)
1991-92	42	16	18	8	-	211	196	40	9th CJBHL	Lost div. quarter-final 0-3 (Capitals)
1992-93	42	19	29	1	-	230	261	40	12th CJBHL	Lost div. quarter-final 0-3 (Merchants)
1993-94	42	17	21	4	-	192	199	39	6th OPJHL-W	Won div. quarter-final 4-2 (Capitals); Lost div. semi-final 3-4 (Kiltys)
1994-95	49	31	16	2	-	243	194	65	2nd OPJHL-W	Won div. quarter-final 4-0 (Rangers); Lost div. semi-final 0-4 (Capitals)
1995-96	50	22	23	5	-	221	209	52	4th OPJHL-Me	Lost div. semi-final 0-4 (Capitals)
1996-97	51	19	26	6	-	212	222	45	5th OPJHL-Me	Lost div. semi-final 0-4 (Merchants)
1997-98	51	23	24	1	3	226	235	50	3rd OPJHL-Me	Lost div. semi-final 2-4 (Blues)
1998-99	51	27	20	3	1	259	245	58	6th OPJHL-W	Won div. quarter-final 3-2 (Capitals); Lost div. semi-final 0-4 (Blues)
1999-00	49	27	17	5	0	213	208	59	4th OPJHL-W	Won div. quarter-final 4-3 (Kiltys); Lost div. semi-final 0-4 (Capitals)
2000-01	49	25	19	4	1	231	219	55	6th OPJHL-W	Lost div. quarter-final 1-4 (Capitals)
2001-02	49	17	29	2	1	199	252	37	8th OPJHL-W	Lost div. quarter-final 0-4 (Capitals)
2002-03	49	10	30	3	6	172	293	29	8th OPJHL-W	Lost div. quarter-final 0-4 (Merchants)
2003-04	49	16	25	6	2	148	187	40	7th OPJHL-W	Lost div. quarter-final 0-4 (Red Wings)
2004-05	49	11	34	2	2	142	272	26	9th OPJHL-W	Lost div. quarter-final 0-4 (Hurricanes)
2005-06	49	25	19	3	2	172	170	55	6th OPJHL-W	Lost div. quarter-final 2-4 (Raiders)
2006-07	49	20	24	3	2	190	226	45	6th OPJHL-W	Lost div. quarter-final 0-4 (Red Wings)
2007-08	49	8	40	-	1	122	281	17	9th OPJHL-W	DNQ
2008-09	49	12	34	-	3	164	272	27	8th OJHL-M	Lost div. quarter-final 0-3 (Raiders)
2009-10	50	27	18	-	5	218	194	59	5th CCHL-W	Won div. quarter-final 4-2 (Crushers); Lost div. semi-final 0-4 (Cougars)
2010-11	50	14	34	-	2	178	283	30	7th OJHL-S	DNQ
Provincial Junior Hockey League
2024-25	42	11	27	3	1	129	199	26	6th of 8 Bloomfield Div; 13th of 16 South Conf; 50th of 63 PJHL	Lost div. quarter-final 1-4 (Riverhawks)
2025-26	42	21	20	1	0	217	219	43	5th of 8 Bloomfield Div; 10th of 16 South Conf; 35th of 61 PJHL	Lost div. quarter-final 2-4 (Rangers)

== Sutherland Cup appearances ==
1977: Stratford Cullitons defeated Streetsville Derbys 4-2
1978: Stratford Cullitons defeated Streetsville Derbys 9-5
1979: Streetsville Derbys defeated St. Catharines Falcons 4-none
1984: Waterloo Siskins defeated Streetsville Derbys 4-3
1986: Stratford Cullitons defeated Streetsville Derbys 4-none

== Notable alumni ==
- Randy Exelby
- Moe Mantha
- Brandon Pirri
