= 1995–96 OPJHL season =

- League: Ontario Provincial Junior A Hockey League
- Sport: Hockey
- Duration: Regular season 1995-09 – 1996-02; Playoffs; 1996-02 – 1996-04
- Number of teams: 22
- Finals champions: Newmarket 87's

OPJHL seasons
- ← 1994–95 1996–97 →

The 1995–96 OPJHL season is the third season of the Ontario Provincial Junior A Hockey League (OPJHL). The twenty-two teams of the MacKenzie, MacKinnon, Phillips, and Ruddock Divisions competed in a 50-game schedule. The top 4 teams of each division make the playoffs.

The winner of the OPJHL playoffs, the Newmarket 87's, won the 1996 Buckland Cup as OHA Champions and the Dudley Hewitt Cup as Central Canadian Champions, but failed to win the 1996 Royal Bank Cup.

== Changes ==
- League jumps from 2 to 4 divisions.
- Barrie Colts leave OPJHL for Ontario Hockey League.
- Markham Waxers leave OPJHL for MetJHL.
- Bramalea Blues, St. Michael's Buzzers, Mississauga Chargers, and Kingston Voyageurs join OPJHL from MetJHL.
- Stouffville Clippers join OPJHL.
- Trenton Sting and Bowmanville Eagles join OPJHL from COJCHL.

== Final standings ==
Note: GP = Games played; W = Wins; L = Losses; OTL = Overtime losses; SL = Shootout losses; GF = Goals for; GA = Goals against; PTS = Points; x = clinched playoff berth; y = clinched division title; z = clinched conference title

MacKenzie Division
Team	GP	W	L	T	GF	GA	P
Bramalea Blues	50	37	10	3	292	142	77
Brampton Capitals	50	33	12	5	258	181	71
Mississauga Chargers	50	30	15	5	258	203	65
Streetsville Derbys	50	22	23	5	221	209	52
St. Michael's Buzzers	50	21	26	3	212	205	47
Royal York Rangers	50	9	39	2	181	364	21
MacKinnon Division
Team	GP	W	L	T	GF	GA	P
Milton Merchants	50	27	16	7	243	172	64
Hamilton Kiltys	50	25	17	8	241	206	60
Oakville Blades	50	21	24	5	211	228	50
Burlington Cougars	50	20	28	2	184	199	43
Georgetown Raiders	50	6	41	3	165	357	19
Phillips Division
Team	GP	W	L	T	GF	GA	P
Newmarket 87's	50	40	9	1	298	163	83
Collingwood Blues	49	28	16	5	237	193	61
Orillia Terriers	50	23	27	0	222	233	48
Lindsay Muskies	50	25	22	3	232	212	55
Stouffville Clippers	50	13	35	2	182	288	30
Ruddock Division
Team	GP	W	L	T	GF	GA	P
Kingston Voyageurs	50	37	10	3	247	135	82
Bowmanville Eagles	50	23	23	4	200	212	53
Trenton Sting	50	23	23	4	243	252	50
Cobourg Cougars	50	21	27	2	201	214	45
Peterborough Jr. Petes	50	14	35	1	185	254	31
Ajax Axemen	49	12	32	5	172	263	30

== 1995-96 OPJHL Playoffs ==
Division Semi-final

Bramalea Blues defeated Oakville Blades 4-games-to-1
Brampton Capitals defeated Streetsville 4-games-to-none
Mississauga Chargers defeated St. Michael's Buzzers 4-games-to-3
Milton Merchants defeated Hamilton Kiltys 4-games-to-2
Newmarket 87's defeated Cobourg Cougars 4-games-to-3
Kingston Voyageurs defeated Trenton Sting 4-games-to-none
Orillia Terriers defeated Collingwood Blues 4-games-to-3
Lindsay Muskies defeated Bowmanville Eagles 4-games-to-none

Division Final

Bramalea Blues defeated Milton Merchants 4-games-to-none
Brampton Capitals defeated Mississauga Chargers 4-games-to-none
Newmarket 87's defeated Orillia Terriers 4-games-to-1
Lindsay Muskies defeated Kingston Voyageurs 4-games-to-3

Semi-final

Brampton Capitals defeated Bramalea Blues 4-games-to-3
Newmarket 87's defeated Lindsay Muskies 4-games-to-3

Final

Newmarket 87's defeated Brampton Capitals 4-games-to-2

== OHA Buckland Cup and Dudley Hewitt Cup Championship ==
The 1996 Dudley Hewitt Cup was hosted by the Cobourg Cougars of Cobourg, Ontario. Both Newmarket and Brampton were granted entry into the event, Newmarket eventually won.

Round Robin

Thunder Bay Flyers (USHL) defeated Cobourg Cougars 5-3
Newmarket 87's defeated Rayside-Balfour Sabrecats (NOJHL) 4-3
Brampton Capitals defeated Thunder Bay Flyers (USHL) 5-2
Cobourg Cougars defeated Rayside-Balfour Sabrecats (NOJHL) 5-3
Brampton Capitals defeated Rayside-Balfour Sabrecats (NOJHL) 10-6
Newmarket 87's defeated Cobourg Cougars 3-1
Brampton Capitals defeated Newmarket 87's 6-3
Thunder Bay Flyers (USHL) defeated Newmarket 87's 3-2
Brampton Capitals defeated Cobourg Cougars 9-3

Semi-final

Brampton Capitals defeated Cobourg Cougars 5-2
Newmarket 87's defeated Thunder Bay Flyers (USHL) 6-3

Final

Newmarket 87's defeated Brampton Capitals 8-2

== 1996 Royal Bank Cup Championship ==
The 1996 Royal Bank Cup was hosted by the Melfort Mustangs of Melfort, Saskatchewan. The Newmarket 87's were defeated in the semi-final.

Round Robin

Newmarket 87's defeated Vernon Vipers (BCHL) 7-5
Newmarket 87's defeated Yorkton Terriers (SJHL) 5-2
Melfort Mustangs (SJHL) defeated Newmarket 87's 11-3
Moncton Beavers (MJAHL) defeated Newmarket 87's 4-3

Semi-final

Vernon Vipers (BCHL) defeated Newmarket 87's 7-4

== Scoring leaders ==
Note: GP = Games played; G = Goals; A = Assists; Pts = Points; PIM = Penalty minutes

Player	Team	GP	G	A	Pts
Trent Walford	Newmarket 87's	50	52	90	142
Scott Stephens	Newmarket 87's	45	63	47	110
Chris Heron	Bramalea Blues	46	48	59	107

== See also ==
- 1996 Royal Bank Cup
- Dudley Hewitt Cup
- List of OJHL seasons
- Northern Ontario Junior Hockey League
- Superior International Junior Hockey League
- Greater Ontario Junior Hockey League
- 1995 in ice hockey
- 1996 in ice hockey

Preceded by 1994–95 OPJHL season	OJHL seasons	Succeeded by 1996–97 OPJHL season
