= Ken Duggan =

Canadian ice hockey player (born 1963)

- Born: February 21, 1963 (age 62); London, Ontario, Canada
- Height: 6 ft 3 in (191 cm)
- Weight: 210 lb (95 kg; 15 st 0 lb)
- Position: Defence
- Shot: Left
- Played for: Minnesota North Stars
- National team: Canada
- NHL draft: Undrafted
- Playing career: 1986–1989

Kenneth B. Duggan (born February 21, 1963) is a Canadian retired professional ice hockey defenceman who played in one National Hockey League game for the Minnesota North Stars during the 1987–88 season, on January 24, 1988 against the Philadelphia Flyers. The rest of his career, which lasted from 1986 to 1989, was mainly spent in the minor leagues.

== Career statistics ==
=== Regular season and playoffs ===
			Regular season					Playoffs
Season	Team	League	GP	G	A	Pts	PIM	GP	G	A	Pts	PIM
1980–81	Bramalea Blues	MetJBHL	42	3	19	22	58	—	—	—	—	—
1981–82	Dixie Beehives	COJHL	23	2	10	12	27	—	—	—	—	—
1981–82	Streetsville Derbys	COJHL	12	1	7	8	23	—	—	—	—	—
1982–83	University of Toronto	CIAU	35	0	5	5	32	—	—	—	—	—
1983–84	University of Toronto	CIAU	—	8	10	18	20	—	—	—	—	—
1984–85	University of Toronto	CIAU	—	6	19	25	105	—	—	—	—	—
1985–86	University of Toronto	CIAU	24	8	25	33	63	—	—	—	—	—
1986–87	New Haven Nighthawks	AHL	13	0	1	1	4	—	—	—	—	—
1986–87	Flint Spirits	IHL	66	2	23	25	51	6	0	2	2	2
1987–88	Minnesota North Stars	NHL	1	0	0	0	0	—	—	—	—	—
1987–88	Flint Spirits	IHL	1	0	0	0	0	—	—	—	—	—
1988–89	Canadian National Team	Intl	3	0	1	1	2	—	—	—	—	—
IHL totals			67	2	23	25	51	6	0	2	2	2
NHL totals			1	0	0	0	0	—	—	—	—	—

== See also ==
- List of players who played only one game in the NHL
