= Mississauga Chargers =

Junior "A" ice hockey team from Mississauga, Ontario, Canada

- City: Mississauga, Ontario, Canada
- League: Ontario Junior Hockey League
- Founded: 1980
- Home arena: Port Credit Memorial Arena
- Colours: Black, red, white
- Owner(s): Heather Stockley
- General manager: Alex Bezerra
- Head coach: Alex Bezerra

Franchise history
- 1980-1984: Weston Dukes
- 1984-1987: King City Dukes
- 1987: North York Civics
- 1987-1988: Richmond Hill Dukes
- 1988-1990: Thornhill Thunderbirds
- 1990: Merged with Markham Connections
- 1990-1991: Markham Thunderbirds
- 1991-1992: Thornhill Thunderbirds
- 1992-1994: Mississauga Senators
- 1994-Present: Mississauga Chargers

Current uniform

The Mississauga Chargers are a Junior "A" ice hockey team from Mississauga, Ontario, Canada. They are a part of the Ontario Junior A Hockey League. They are the product of a 1990 merger of two former Metro Junior B franchises, the Thornhill Thunderbirds and the Markham Connection. After the 1990 merger the team spent one year in Markham known as the Markham Thunderbirds, and in 1991 they returned to their Thornhill Thunderbirds name for one season. In 1992, the team moved to Mississauga. As a member of the Metro Junior A Hockey League they participated for 3 seasons. They left for the OPJHL in 1995. They have had a glim past few years, but in the 2007–08 season they saw a rare light when team captain Bruce Crawford lead the entire OPJHL in scoring (41-57-98).

== History ==
=== Richmond Hill/Thornhill franchise ===
This franchise had begun in 1981 as the Weston Dukes, becoming the King City Dukes in 1984, and becoming the Richmond Hill Dukes in 1987 for one season. The team moved to Thornill in 1988, and was named the Thunderbirds for two seasons before the merger.

=== Markham Travelways/Connection franchise ===
In 1983 the North York Flames moved to Markham, and were named as the Travelways. In 1989 they were renamed the Markham Connection after the Travelways bus sponsor was sold.

== Season-by-season results ==
=== The Thornhill franchise ===
Season	GP	W	L	T	OTL	GF	GA	P	Results	Playoffs
Weston Dukes
1980-81	42	14	22	6	-	183	201	34	10th Metro B	DNQ
1981-82	34	11	19	4	-	148	202	26	10th Metro B	
1982-83	35	3	25	7	-	149	255	13	12th Metro B	
1983-84	42	16	19	7	-	198	216	39	7th Metro B	Lost quarter-final
King City Dukes
1984-85	36	15	21	0	-	192	195	30	8th Metro B	
1985-86	37	12	22	3	-	205	243	27	9th Metro B	DNQ
1986-87	37	17	17	3	-	202	223	37	8th Metro B	Lost quarter-final
Richmond Hill Dukes
1987-88	37	9	24	4	-	178	244	22	11th Metro B	DNQ
Thornhill Thunderbirds
1988-89	38	19	13	6	-	190	172	44	3rd Metro B	
1989-90	44	27	9	8	-	246	147	62	3rd Metro B	Won League
Markham Thunderbirds
1990-91	44	18	20	6	-	176	171	42	8th Metro B	
Thornhill Thunderbirds
1991-92	44	36	6	2	-	245	113	74	1st Metro A	
Mississauga Senators
1992-93	48	25	18	5	-	212	177	55	5th Metro A	
1993-94	50	17	31	2	-	213	260	36	12th Metro A	DNQ
Mississauga Chargers
1994-95	50	23	24	3	-	249	271	49	7th Metro A	
1995-96	50	30	15	5	-	258	203	65	3rd OPJHL-Me	
1996-97	51	29	19	3	-	234	220	62	3rd OPJHL-Me	
1997-98	51	15	29	3	4	178	265	37	4th OPJHL-Me	
1998-99	51	6	41	3	1	161	321	16	12th OPJHL-W	
1999-00	49	19	24	2	4	190	220	44	7th OPJHL-W	
2000-01	49	25	16	3	5	216	194	58	4th OPJHL-W	
2001-02	49	18	23	4	4	174	164	44	7th OPJHL-W	
2002-03	49	24	19	3	3	189	203	54	6th OPJHL-W	
2003-04	49	25	21	0	3	214	225	53	5th OPJHL-W	
2004-05	49	14	32	2	1	197	260	31	8th OPJHL-W	
2005-06	49	16	29	4	0	173	221	36	8th OPJHL-W	Lost Conf. QF
2006-07	49	15	33	0	1	179	272	31	7th OPJHL-W	Lost Conf. QF
2007-08	49	22	23	-	4	213	245	48	7th OPJHL-W	
2008-09	49	11	33	-	5	186	300	27	9th OJHL-M	
2009-10	56	18	34	-	4	207	273	40	12th OJAHL	DNQ
2010-11	50	12	34	-	4	184	299	28	7th OJHL-W	DNQ
2011-12	49	11	38	-	0	140	282	22	7th OJHL-S	DNQ
2012-13	55	22	29	-	4	194	228	48	6th OJHL-S	DNQ
2013-14	53	25	26	-	2	169	206	52	4th OJHL-S	Lost Conf. QF
2014-15	-	-	-	-	-	-	-	-	-	-
2015-16	54	10	41	0	3	177	158	23	6th of 6 South Div; 10th of 11 SW Conf; 21st of 22 OJHL	DNQ
2016-17	54	16	34	2	2	159	238	36	6th of 6 South Div; 10th of 11 SW Conf; 18th of 22 OJHL	DNQ
2017-18	54	19	29	4	2	133	178	44	6th of 6 South Div; 9th of 11 SW Conf; 17th of 22 OJHL	DNQ
2018-19	54	13	35	1	5	118	321	32	5th of 5 South Div; 10th of 10 SE Conf; 20th of 22 OJHL	DNQ
2019-20	54	17	33	1	3	157	231	38	5th of 6 South Div; 9th of 11 SE Conf; 19th of 22 OJHL	DNQ
2020-21	SEASON CANCELLED (COVID-19)									
2020-21	53	7	44	0	2	119	263	16	5th of 6 South Div; 9th of 11 SE Conf; 19th of 22 OJHL	DNQ
2022-23	54	6	45	1	2	117	303	14	12th of 12 SE Conf; 20th of 21 OJHL	DNQ
2023-24	56	4	48	0	4	98	298	12	12th of 12 West Conf; 24th of 24 OJHL	DNQ
2024-25	56	14	35	0	7	178	287	35	11th of 12 West Conf; 20th of 24 OJHL	DNQ

=== Playoffs ===
- 1990 Won League

Thornhill Thunderbirds defeated Bramalea Blues 4-games-to-2
Thornhill Thunderbirds defeated Henry Carr Crusaders 4-games-to-2
Thornhill Thunderbirds defeated Wexford Raiders 4-games-to-3 METJHL CHAMPIONS

- 1991 Lost Preliminary

Kingston Voyageurs defeated Markham Thunderbirds 2-games-to-1

- 1992 Lost semi-final

Thornhill Thunderbirds defeated Pickering Panthers 4-games-to-none
Wexford Raiders defeated Thornhill Thunderbirds 4-games-to-2

- 1993 Lost quarter-final

St. Michael's Buzzers defeated Mississauga Senators 4-games-to-2

- 1994 DNQ
- 1995 Lost quarter-final

Caledon Canadians defeated Mississauga Chargers 4-games-to-none

== Markham Travelways/Connections franchise ==
Markham Travelways/Connections
- City: Markham, Ontario, Canada (1983-1990); North York, Ontario, Canada (1974-1983)
- League: Metro Junior B Hockey League
- Operated: 1974-1990

Franchise history
- 1974-1977: North York Rangers
- 1977-1983: North York Flames
- 1983-1989: Markham Travelways
- 1989-1990: Markham Connections
- 1990: Merged with Thornhill Thunderbirds

Season	GP	W	L	T	OTL	GF	GA	P	Results	Playoffs
North York Rangers
1974-75	38	12	21	5	-	170	201	29	10th Metro B	
1975-76	36	7	23	6	-	153	208	20	12th Metro B	
1976-77	36	15	17	4	-	192	172	34	10th Metro B	
North York Flames
1977-78	35	8	19	8	-	167	177	24	12th Metro B	
1978-79	44	22	18	4	-	265	235	48	7th Metro B	
1979-80	42	24	11	7	-	290	201	55	3rd Metro B	
1980-81	42	24	14	4	-	223	178	52	4th Metro B	
1981-82	36	13	16	7	-	177	191	33	7th Metro B	
1982-83	36	6	26	4	-	153	251	16	11th Metro B	
Markham Travelways
1983-84	42	14	24	4	-	186	225	34	10th Metro B	DNQ
1984-85	36	23	11	2	-	218	185	48	4th Metro B	
1985-86	37	23	6	8	-	245	172	54	3rd Metro B	Lost semi-final
1986-87	37	19	11	7	-	171	146	45	4th Metro B	Lost semi-final
1987-88	37	19	12	6	-	196	154	44	5th Metro B	Lost final
1988-89	40	12	25	3	-	150	229	27	9th Metro B	
Markham Connection
1989-90	44	12	27	5	-	192	291	29	9th Metro B	

- 1990 Lost Preliminary

Oshawa Legionaires defeated Markham Connections 3-games-to-none

== Notable alumni ==
- Adam Graves
- Curtis Joseph
- Manny Legace
- Jamal Mayers
- Jeff O’Neill
- Mark Popovic
- Kyle Quincey
- Nick Paul
- Anthony Cirelli

== Other Mississauga teams ==
Before the Chargers, the Mississauga Torspos played in the Metro Junior B league from 1985 until 1988. Also, in 1992, the Central Junior "B" league Streetsville Derbys were known as the Mississauga Derbys for the 1992–93 season, before retaining their original name.
