= Christopher Tanev =

Canadian ice hockey player (born 1989)

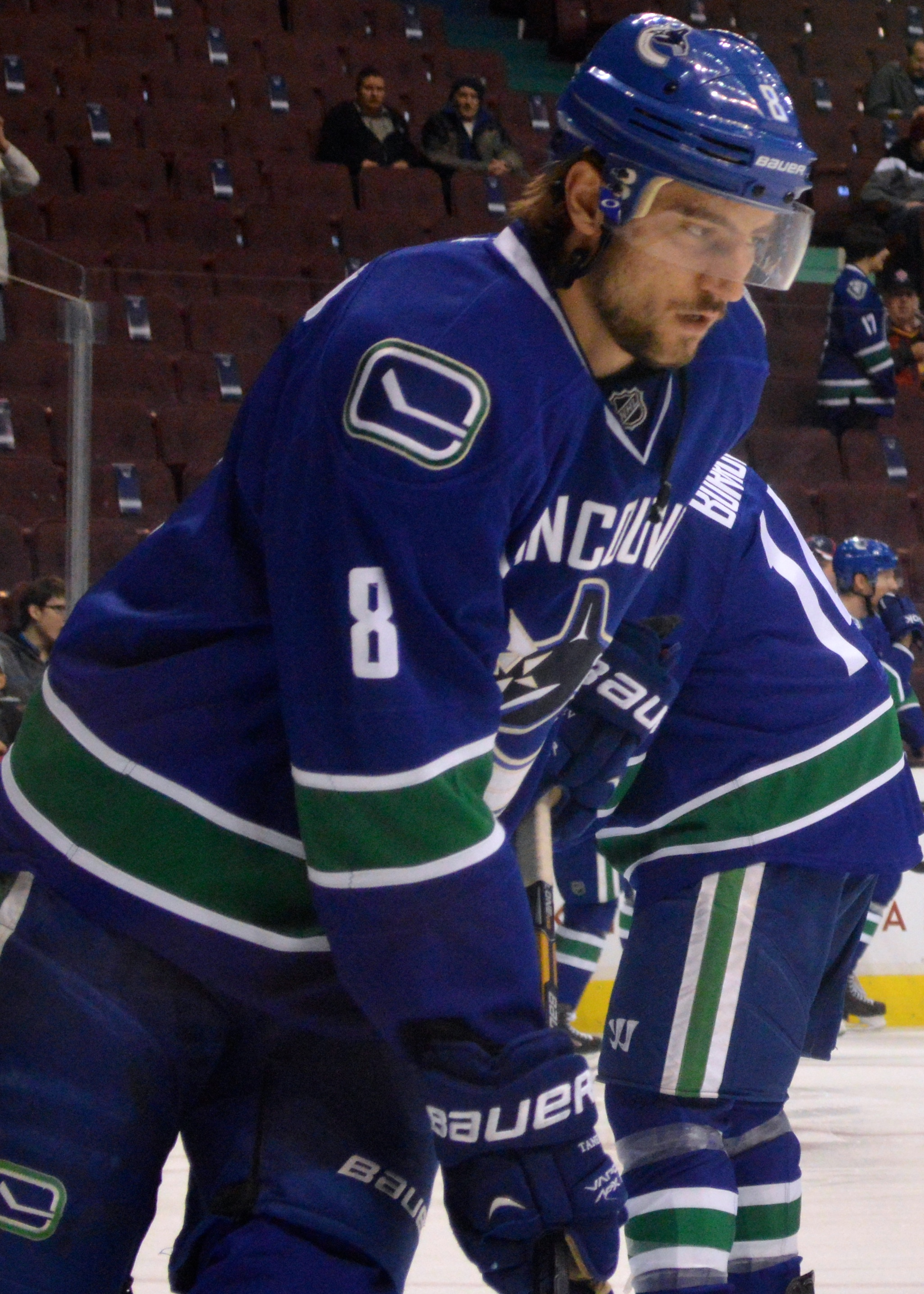
- Tanev with the Vancouver Canucks in 2015
- Born: December 20, 1989 (age 36) East York, Ontario, Canada
- Height: 6 ft 3 in (191 cm)
- Weight: 199 lb (90 kg; 14 st 3 lb)
- Position: Defence
- Shoots: Right
- NHL team Former teams: Toronto Maple Leafs; Vancouver Canucks; Calgary Flames; Dallas Stars
- National team: Canada
- NHL draft: Undrafted
- Playing career: 2010–present

Christopher Tanev (born December 20, 1989) is a Canadian professional ice hockey player who is a defenceman for the Toronto Maple Leafs of the National Hockey League (NHL). He previously played for the Vancouver Canucks, Calgary Flames, and Dallas Stars.

Unselected in the NHL entry draft, he was signed by the Canucks as a free agent after his freshman year with the Rochester Institute of Technology Tigers. In his only college season, he was named Atlantic Hockey's Rookie of the Year, in addition to receiving All-Tournament and Third All-Star Team honours, while helping the Tigers to a conference championship. Prior to college, he played three seasons in the Ontario Provincial Junior Hockey League.

== Early life ==
Tanev was born in East York, Ontario, to Sophie Meredith and Mike "Misho" Tanev. He has two brothers, Brandon (who plays left wing for the Utah Mammoth) and Kyle, and is of Macedonian descent. Playing minor hockey within the Greater Toronto Hockey League, he competed with the Toronto Red Wings. After being cut from seven midget-level teams at age 16 due to a lack of size (he was barely five feet and roughly 120 pounds at the time), Tanev resorted to playing for his high school's team and took up roller hockey in the summer. After graduating from high school at the East York Collegiate Institute, he enrolled in the Rochester Institute of Technology as a finance major while playing college hockey.

== Playing career ==
=== Junior and college ===
Tanev played in the Ontario Provincial Junior Hockey League (OPJHL) for three seasons. Starting off with the Durham Fury in 2006–07, he recorded no goals and nine assists over 40 games. He split the following season between Durham, the Stouffville Spirit and the Markham Waxers renamed Markham Royals, combining for 17 points (2 goals and 15 assists) over 49 games between the three teams. Playing the 2008–09 campaign with Markham, he led all team defencemen in scoring with 41 points in 50 games, while serving as an alternate captain; he was named the team's top defenceman at the end of the season.

In 2009–10, he joined the NCAA Division I ranks with the Rochester Institute of Technology (RIT) Tigers of the Atlantic Hockey Conference. Placed on the team's top defensive pairing with team captain Dan Ringwald, he recorded 10 goals and 28 points over 41 games, while leading his team with a +33 plus-minus rating. After being named Atlantic Hockey Rookie of the Week on three occasions during the season, he received Rookie of the Year honours and was named to the conference's All-Rookie and Third All-Star Teams. In the 2010 playoffs, Tanev helped the Tigers to a conference championship, defeating the Sacred Heart Pioneers in the final. He was named to the All-Tournament Team. Advancing to the NCAA tournament, RIT was eliminated in the national semifinal by the Wisconsin Badgers. Tigers head coach Wayne Wilson described him during his freshman year as a "late bloomer", having grown six inches in his final year of junior, while praising his offensive skills.

=== Vancouver Canucks ===
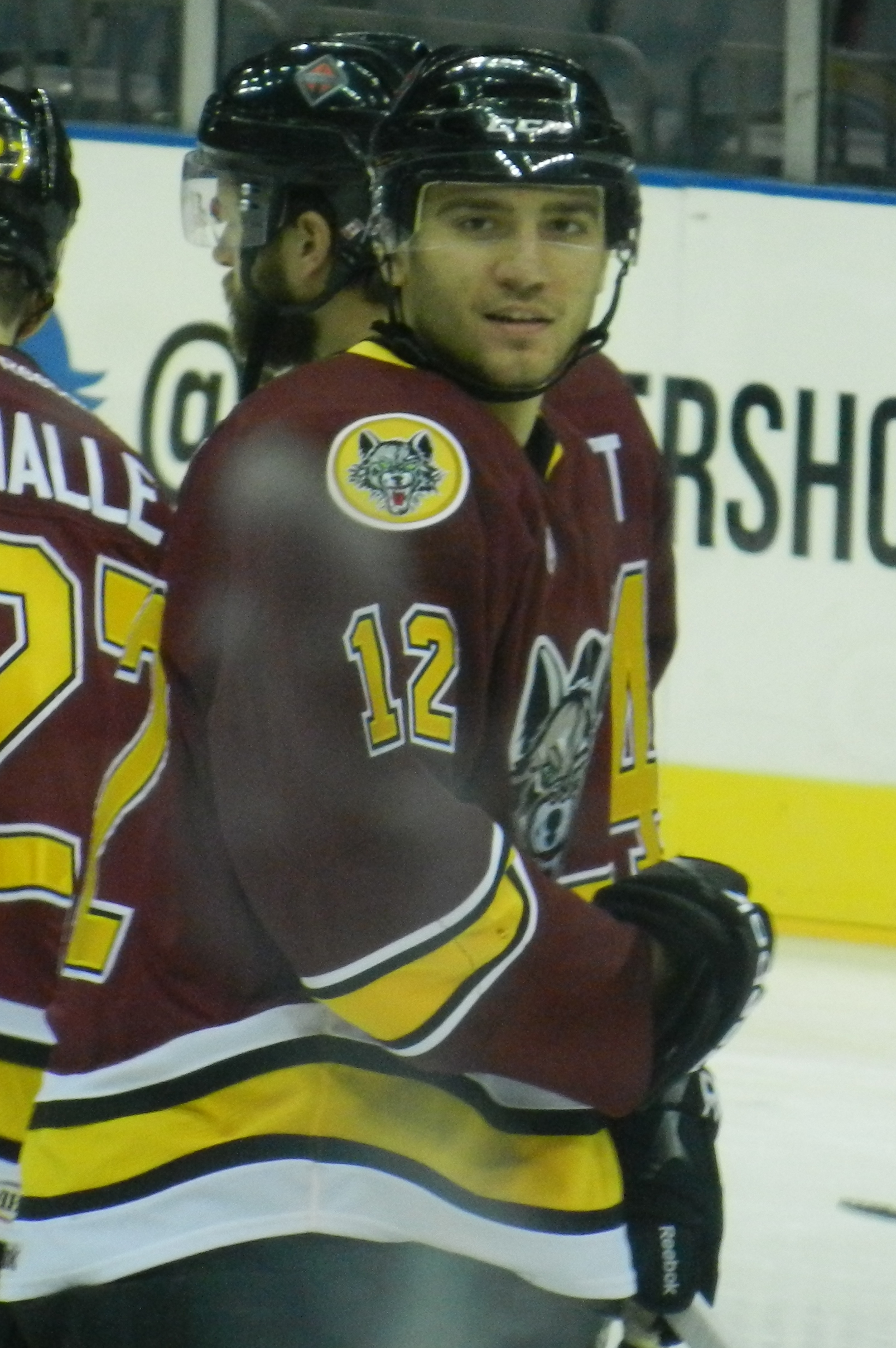
Tanev with the Wolves in November 2012

During the NCAA tournament, Tanev was scouted by Vancouver Canucks director of player development Dave Gagner, who was previously acquainted with Tanev as his childhood roller hockey coach. The Canucks scouting staff collectively identified him as "the smartest player on the ice" in the East Regional segment of the tournament. On May 31, 2010, Tanev signed as an undrafted free agent with the Canucks, foregoing his final three years of college hockey eligibility. He had received interest from at least three other teams, including the San Jose Sharks, Ottawa Senators and Columbus Blue Jackets, but ultimately chose Vancouver.

Beginning the 2010–11 season with the Canucks' minor league affiliate, the Manitoba Moose of the American Hockey League (AHL), he scored his first professional goal against the Rochester Americans on November 13, 2010. He received his first call-up to Vancouver on January 16, 2011, after injuries to Canucks defencemen Andrew Alberts and Aaron Rome. Making his Canucks debut two days later against the Colorado Avalanche, he became the first RIT alumnus to play in the NHL. He later recorded his first NHL point on January 24, a second assist on a powerplay goal by Dan Hamhuis, the final Canucks tally in a 7–1 win against the Dallas Stars. He remained with the NHL team for an extended period as Canucks defencemen continued to suffer injuries.

On March 31, 2011, Tanev had to be helped off the ice during a game against the Los Angeles Kings after opposing forward Kyle Clifford pushed him head-first into the end-boards. While recovering from the upper-body injury, he was returned to the Moose on April 7, as several regular defencemen returned to the Canucks line-up from injury at that time. Averaging 13 minutes of ice time per game over 29 NHL contests with one assist, Tanev was commended by Canucks head coach Alain Vigneault for being "very dependable...making the high-percentage plays." Vigneault also added that he had a good chance of playing with the Canucks "on a regular basis down the road." Completing the 2010–11 regular season with the Moose, he finished with 1 goal and 8 assists over 39 AHL games. Tanev added a goal and 2 assists in 14 playoff games as the Moose were defeated in the second round. Following Manitoba's elimination, he was called up to the Canucks for their playoff run as a reserve. In the Canucks' Game 3 contest against the San Jose Sharks in the third round, defencemen Christian Ehrhoff and Aaron Rome were both injured. Tanev was inserted into the line-up for the following game and made his NHL playoff debut on May 22, 2011. As the Canucks moved on to the Stanley Cup Finals against the Boston Bruins, Ehrhoff and Rome returned to action, temporarily sending Tanev back to the sidelines. Following injuries to Dan Hamhuis and Rome's suspension, Tanev played in the final three contests of the series, which the Canucks lost in seven games.

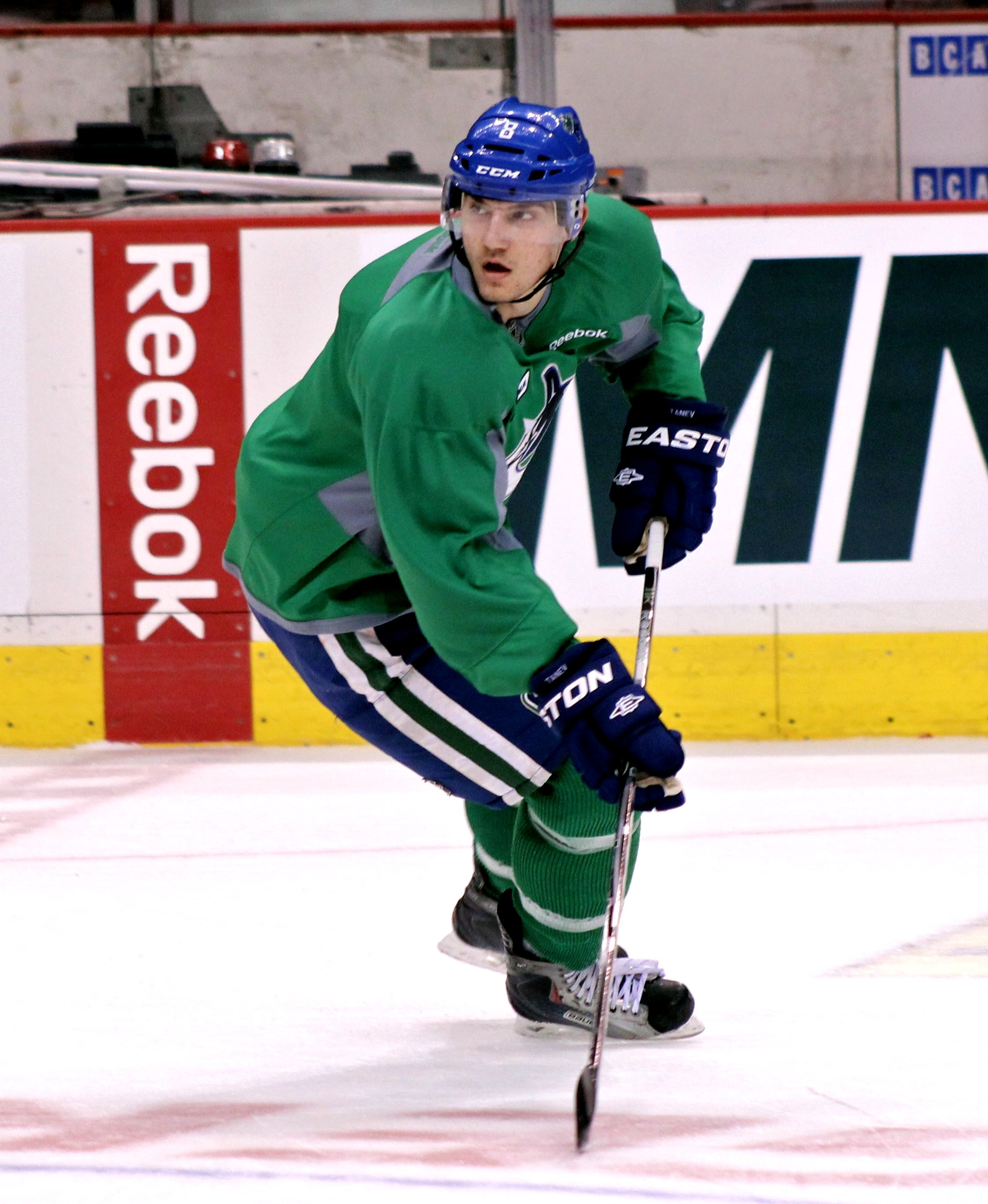
Tanev during a practice with the Canucks, March 2012

Following his professional rookie season, Tanev trained in the off-season particularly to increase his strength. Entering the Canucks' training camp with an added 10 pounds, he made the Canucks' opening line-up for the 2011–12 season. After dressing for three of the team's first five games, he was reassigned to the Chicago Wolves, Vancouver's new AHL affiliate (the Moose were relocated to St. John's, Newfoundland, after the Winnipeg Jets returned to the NHL). Vigneault explained that the organization wanted Tanev receiving more ice time than he could receive in Vancouver while competing for the "No. 5 to No. 8 spots on [the] team." In his first game with the Wolves, he injured an oblique muscle after receiving a hit and was sidelined for a month. After returning, he formed a top defensive pairing on the team with Kevin Connauton. In late-January 2012, he was called up by the Canucks for one game, then again in mid-February until the end of the season. In 25 NHL games, he recorded two assists, while also recording 14 assists over 34 AHL games in 2011–12. Tanev also competed in all five of the Canucks' playoff games in 2012 without registering a point.

His first NHL goal was scored on February 4, 2013, in an overtime win against Devan Dubnyk of the Edmonton Oilers. On March 24, 2015 Tanev signed a 5-year contract extension with the Canucks.

Tanev scored 11 seconds into overtime on August 7, 2020 as the Canucks advanced to the Western Conference First Round, beating the Minnesota Wild 5–4 for a 3–1 Qualifying Round series victory. It is tied for the second-fastest goal to start overtime in Stanley Cup playoff history, tying J. P. Parisé (1975) and former Canucks teammate Alex Burrows (2011), with only Brian Skrudland's 9 seconds in 1986 being faster.

=== Calgary Flames ===
On October 9, 2020, Tanev left the Canucks as a free agent after 10 seasons and signed a four-year, $18 million contract with fellow Western Canadian club, the Calgary Flames.

=== Dallas Stars ===
On February 28, 2024, Tanev was traded by the Flames to the Dallas Stars, in a three-team deal where the New Jersey Devils retained some salary. Dallas also received Devils goaltending prospect Cole Brady, New Jersey received Dallas' 2026 fourth-round pick, and Calgary received Dallas' 2024 second-round pick, defence prospect Artem Grushnikov, and a conditional third-round pick.

=== Toronto Maple Leafs ===
On July 1, 2024, Tanev signed a six-year, $27 million contract with the Toronto Maple Leafs after being traded to them by the Stars for Max Ellis and a seventh-round pick in the 2026 NHL entry draft.

== International play ==
Medal record

Men's ice hockey

Representing Canada

World Championships
Gold medal – first place	2016 Russia	

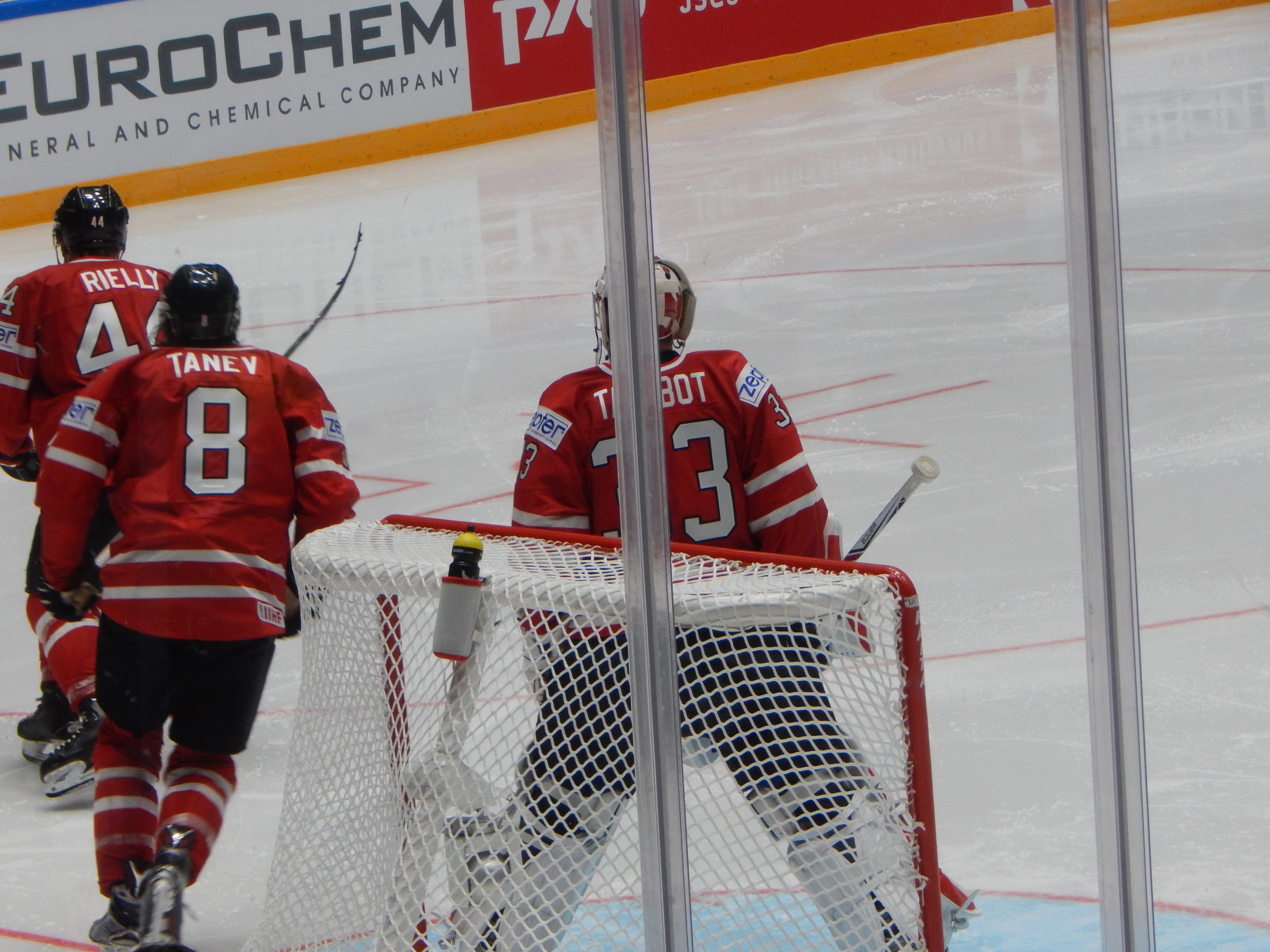
Tanev (left foreground) with the Canadian men's national hockey team during the 2016 IIHF World Championships

Tanev played a major role on the 2016 IIHF World Championships team which captured gold against Finland. He was praised for his composure and defensive play by Team Canada head coach Bill Peters, and was named the best player of the game in Canada's 7–1 victory over Hungary. In the tournament semifinal versus the United States, Tanev prevented a scoring chance by the Americans late in the third period, which would have resulted in a game-tying goal. After accidentally breaking his stick in the American zone, he raced back to the Canadian end, intercepting a pass and blocking a shot without the use of his stick.

Tanev's biggest moment came in the tournament final against Finland, recording 21:38 of ice time, including a team-high 8:37 in the third period as Canada defended their one-goal lead. Team Canada held on to win the gold medal for a second consecutive year.

According to many observers, including Ray Ferraro and teammates Brendan Gallagher and Connor McDavid, Tanev was perhaps the best defenceman in the tournament in terms of his defensive play - he and his defence partner, Morgan Rielly, were not on the ice for a single goal against at even-strength. Tanev also played a major role on Canada's tournament-best penalty kill that allowed just two goals against in 29 opportunities. He registered one assist during the tournament.

== Playing style ==
Tanev is a defenceman lauded for his "hockey sense" and puck-moving ability. Upon being scouted out of college by Canucks personnel, his style of play was compared to offensive defenceman Christian Ehrhoff. Not aggressive, Tanev relies primarily on his positioning to check players. Following his performance in Game 5 of the 2011 Stanley Cup Finals, teammate Kevin Bieksa also highlighted his calm on-ice demeanour, quipping that "he could have played with a cigarette in his mouth."

== Personal life ==
Tanev is married to Kendra Shelters-Tanev (née Shelters), whom he met during his lone year at the Rochester Institute of Technology. The couple have two children together, a son Bobby (born 2022) and a second child born November 2024.

During the COVID-19 pandemic, Tanev returned to school after a 10-year hiatus from education to pursue a degree in finance, at the suggestion of his wife. In May 2025, he noted that he was near completion on his degree after slowly taking classes concurrently to his playing career.

== Career statistics ==
=== Regular season and playoffs ===
			Regular season					Playoffs
Season	Team	League	GP	G	A	Pts	PIM	GP	G	A	Pts	PIM
2006–07	Durham Fury	OPJHL	40	0	9	9	8	4	0	3	3	6
2007–08	Durham Fury	OPJHL	19	1	6	7	12	—	—	—	—	—
2007–08	Stouffville Spirit	OPJHL	4	0	0	0	0	—	—	—	—	—
2007–08	Markham Waxers	OPJHL	26	1	9	10	12	23	1	2	3	4
2008–09	Markham Waxers	OPJHL	50	4	37	41	33	14	1	5	6	8
2009–10	RIT Tigers	AHC	41	10	18	28	4	—	—	—	—	—
2010–11	Manitoba Moose	AHL	39	1	8	9	16	14	1	2	3	4
2010–11	Vancouver Canucks	NHL	29	0	1	1	0	5	0	0	0	0
2011–12	Vancouver Canucks	NHL	25	0	2	2	2	5	0	0	0	0
2011–12	Chicago Wolves	AHL	34	0	14	14	6	—	—	—	—	—
2012–13	Chicago Wolves	AHL	29	2	10	12	6	—	—	—	—	—
2012–13	Vancouver Canucks	NHL	38	2	5	7	10	—	—	—	—	—
2013–14	Vancouver Canucks	NHL	64	6	11	17	8	—	—	—	—	—
2014–15	Vancouver Canucks	NHL	70	2	18	20	12	6	0	3	3	0
2015–16	Vancouver Canucks	NHL	69	4	14	18	8	—	—	—	—	—
2016–17	Vancouver Canucks	NHL	53	2	8	10	14	—	—	—	—	—
2017–18	Vancouver Canucks	NHL	42	2	9	11	8	—	—	—	—	—
2018–19	Vancouver Canucks	NHL	55	2	10	12	18	—	—	—	—	—
2019–20	Vancouver Canucks	NHL	69	2	18	20	41	17	1	6	7	4
2020–21	Calgary Flames	NHL	56	2	10	12	6	—	—	—	—	—
2021–22	Calgary Flames	NHL	82	6	22	28	22	8	0	1	1	2
2022–23	Calgary Flames	NHL	65	1	12	13	21	—	—	—	—	—
2023–24	Calgary Flames	NHL	56	1	13	14	14	—	—	—	—	—
2023–24	Dallas Stars	NHL	19	1	4	5	10	19	0	2	2	6
2024–25	Toronto Maple Leafs	NHL	75	3	15	18	24	13	1	2	3	2
2025–26	Toronto Maple Leafs	NHL	11	0	2	2	0	—	—	—	—	—
NHL totals			878	36	174	210	218	73	2	14	16	14

=== International ===
Year	Team	Event	Result	GP	G	A	Pts	PIM
2016	Canada	WC	1st place, gold medalist(s)	10	0	1	1	0
Totals				10	0	1	1	0

== Awards and honours ==
Award	Year
Markham Waxers
Top Defenceman	2009
College
Atlantic Hockey Rookie of the Year	2010
All-Atlantic Hockey Third Team	2010
All-Atlantic Hockey Rookie Team	2010
Atlantic Hockey All-Tournament Team	2010
Vancouver Canucks
Babe Pratt Trophy	2015
Calgary Flames
J. R. "Bud" McCaig Award	2021

Awards and achievements
Preceded by David Kostuch	Atlantic Hockey Rookie of the Year; 2009–10	Succeeded by Taylor Holstrom
