= 1997–98 OPJHL season =

Ice hockey season

- League: Ontario Provincial Junior A Hockey League
- Sport: Hockey
- Duration: Regular season 1997-09 – 1998-02; Playoffs; 1998-02 – 1998-04
- Number of teams: 22
- Finals champions: Milton Merchants

OPJHL seasons
- ← 1996–97 1998–99 →

The 1997–98 OPJHL season is the fifth season of the Ontario Provincial Junior A Hockey League (OPJHL). The twenty-two teams of the MacKenzie, MacKinnon, Phillips, and Ruddock Divisions competed in a 51-game schedule. The top 4 teams of each division make the playoffs.

The winner of the OPJHL playoffs, the Milton Merchants, won the 1998 Buckland Cup as OHA Champions and the Dudley Hewitt Cup as Central Canadian Champions, but failed to win the 1998 Royal Bank Cup.

== Changes ==
- Aurora Tigers join OPJHL from MetJHL.
- Orillia Terriers move to Rama, Ontario and become Couchiching Terriers.
- Newmarket 87's become Newmarket Hurricanes.
- Peterborough Jr. Petes become Peterborough Bees.
- St. Michael's Buzzers take leave of absence.

== Final standings ==
Note: GP = Games played; W = Wins; L = Losses; OTL = Overtime losses; SL = Shootout losses; GF = Goals for; GA = Goals against; PTS = Points; x = clinched playoff berth; y = clinched division title; z = clinched conference title

MacKenzie Division
Team	GP	W	L	T	OTL	GF	GA	P
Brampton Capitals	51	39	7	1	4	282	163	83
Bramalea Blues	51	32	11	6	2	244	182	72
Streetsville Derbys	51	23	24	1	3	226	235	50
Mississauga Chargers	51	15	29	3	4	178	265	37
Vaughan Vipers	51	7	40	2	2	192	354	18
MacKinnon Division
Team	GP	W	L	T	OTL	GF	GA	P
Milton Merchants	51	42	8	1	0	357	127	85
Oakville Blades	51	31	15	4	1	215	183	67
Burlington Cougars	51	24	22	5	0	217	207	53
Hamilton Kiltys	51	21	22	5	3	222	195	50
Georgetown Raiders	51	6	44	1	0	134	330	13
Phillips Division
Team	GP	W	L	T	OTL	GF	GA	P
Collingwood Blues	51	35	12	3	1	263	156	74
Newmarket Hurricanes	51	28	17	5	1	249	185	62
Aurora Tigers	51	27	17	6	1	226	196	61
Lindsay Muskies	51	23	20	5	3	198	186	54
Couchiching Terriers	51	23	20	7	1	220	213	54
Stouffville Spirit	51	16	32	2	1	194	280	35
Ruddock Division
Team	GP	W	L	T	OTL	GF	GA	P
Peterborough Bees	51	29	18	4	0	254	176	62
Trenton Sting	51	28	17	6	0	237	193	62
Bowmanville Eagles	51	27	19	5	0	210	178	59
Kingston Voyageurs	51	23	16	10	2	224	192	58
Ajax Axemen	50	13	35	2	0	190	282	28
Cobourg Cougars	50	8	39	3	0	146	315	19

== 1997-98 OPJHL Playoffs ==
Division Semi-final

Milton Merchants defeated Mississauga Chargers 4-games-to-none
Hamilton Kiltys defeated Brampton Capitals 4-games-to-1
Bramalea Blues defeated Streetsville Derbys 4-games-to-2
Oakville Blades defeated Burlington Cougars 4-games-to-2
Couchiching Terriers defeated Collingwood Blues 4-games-to-2
Peterborough Bees defeated Kingston Voyageurs 3-games-to-2
Trenton Sting defeated Bowmanville Eagles 4-games-to-1
Newmarket Hurricanes defeated Aurora Tigers 4-games-to-1

Division Final

Milton Merchants defeated Oakville Blades 4-games-to-2
Hamilton Kiltys defeated Bramalea Blues 4-games-to-2
Couchiching Terriers defeated Newmarket Hurricanes 4-games-to-1
Trenton Sting defeated Peterborough Bees 3-games-to-2

Semi-final

Milton Merchants defeated Hamilton Kiltys 4-games-to-none
Trenton Sting defeated Couchiching Terriers 4-games-to-1

Final

Milton Merchants defeated Trenton Sting 4-games-to-none

== OHA Buckland Cup Championship ==
Best-of-7 series

Milton Merchants defeated Wexford Raiders (MetJHL) 4-games-to-1

Milton Merchants 11 - Wexford Raiders 2
Milton Merchants 3 - Wexford Raiders 2 2OT
Milton Merchants 6 - Wexford Raiders 1
Wexford Raiders 4 - Milton Merchants 3 OT
Milton Merchants 6 - Wexford Raiders 1

== Dudley Hewitt Cup Championship ==
Best-of-7 series

Milton Merchants defeated Rayside-Balfour Sabrecats (NOJHL) 4-games-to-2

Rayside-Balfour Sabrecats 4 - Milton Merchants 1
Milton Merchants 5 - Rayside-Balfour Sabrecats 2
Rayside-Balfour Sabrecats 4 - Milton Merchants 1
Milton Merchants 5 - Rayside-Balfour Sabrecats 4 3OT
Milton Merchants 2 - Rayside-Balfour Sabrecats 1 OT
Milton Merchants 3 - Rayside-Balfour Sabrecats 1

== 1998 Royal Bank Cup Championship ==
The 1998 Royal Bank Cup was hosted by the Nanaimo Clippers of Nanaimo, British Columbia. The Milton Merchants were defeated in the semi-final.

Round Robin

Nanaimo Clippers (BCHL) defeated Milton Merchants 6-2
South Surrey Eagles (BCHL) defeated Milton Merchants 3-0
Milton Merchants defeated Brockville Braves (CJHL) 5-2
Weyburn Red Wings (SJHL) defeated Milton Merchants 6-2

Semi-final

South Surrey Eagles (BCHL) defeated Milton Merchants 6-2

== Scoring leaders ==
Note: GP = Games played; G = Goals; A = Assists; Pts = Points; PIM = Penalty minutes

Player	Team	GP	G	A	Pts
Darren Haydar	Milton Merchants	51	71	69	140
Noel Burkitt	Trenton Sting	51	52	63	115
Martin Miljko	Brampton Capitals	50	59	46	105
Ron Baker	Milton Merchants	48	37	66	103
Darcy King	Stouffville Spirit	49	35	68	103
David Deeves	Collingwood Blues	51	39	63	102
Steve Guiney	Aurora Tigers	47	41	60	101

== See also ==
- 1998 Royal Bank Cup
- Dudley Hewitt Cup
- List of OJHL seasons
- Northern Ontario Junior Hockey League
- Superior International Junior Hockey League
- Greater Ontario Junior Hockey League

Preceded by 1996–97 OPJHL season	OJHL seasons	Succeeded by 1998–99 OPJHL season
