= Bramalea Blues =

Former ice hockey team from Ontario, Canada

- City: Bramalea, Ontario, Canada (1972-2007); Brampton, Ontario, Canada (2008-2010)
- League: Ontario Junior Hockey League; Metro Junior A Hockey League
- Operated: 1972-2010
- Home arena: James McCurry Victoria Park Arena (1972-2007); Powerade Centre (2008-2010)
- Colours: Blue, Yellow, and White
- Affiliate: Brampton Battalion (OHL)

Franchise history
- 2010: Merged w/ Brampton Capitals

The Bramalea Blues were a Junior "A" ice hockey team from Bramalea, Ontario, Canada. Their final two seasons were played in Brampton, Ontario at the Powerade Centre. They were a part of the Ontario Junior A Hockey League but also used to be a part of the Metro Junior A Hockey League. They joined the OPJHL in 1995. In 2010 the Blues took a buyout offer from their league to cease operations.

== History ==
Formed in 1972, the Blues joined the Metro Junior "B" league. The Metro had just been curtailed by the Ontario Hockey Association as the many of their top teams were moved to the newly created OHA Junior "A" league. The Blues won the Sutherland Cup in 1975 as OHA Junior "B" Champions and was one of the top Junior "B" teams in Ontario for almost two decades winning league titles in 1974, 1975, 1985, and 1988.

In 1991, the Metro league (along with the Blues) went Junior "A". The team stayed with the Metro until 1995 when a mass exodus of teams made the jump to the OPJHL. In 1999, the Blues won the Buckland Cup as league champions and the Dudley Hewitt Cup as Central Canadian Champions. They fell short at the Royal Bank Cup.

In the 1990s, the Blues had a working agreement of affiliation with the South-Central Triple A Hockey League's local Chinguacousy Blues minor hockey club.

=== 1999 Royal Bank Cup ===
The Blues opened up the Royal Bank Cup 1999 with a 4–2 victory over the British Columbia Hockey League's Vernon Vipers—the Doyle Cup Champions. The Blues then took out the Anavet Cup Champions, the Saskatchewan Junior Hockey League's Estevan Bruins 4–3. The Blues then beat the host Yorkton Terriers by a score of 5–1. The Blues had already clinched first place in the round robin and floated through a 5–1 loss to the Fred Page Cup Champion Charlottetown Abbies of the Maritime Junior A Hockey League.

The slack effort did not pay off. The Blues entered the semi-final as the favourite to win the Royal Bank Cup, but were upset by the Vernon Vipers by a score of 3–2. The Vipers went on to win the Cup, and the Blues were left with a long and unhappy ride home from Yorkton, Saskatchewan.

=== 1978 Ontario Winter Games Gold Medallist / Bramalea Blues ===
In 1978 the Bramalea Blues won the 1978 Ontario Winter Games hockey competition in Kingston, Ontario, Canada. The final game was played against the Streetsville Derbys and the final score was 3–2. This Ontario Winter Games gold medal win qualified the Bramalea Blues to represent Ontario for the 1979 Canada Winter Games in Brandon, Manitoba, Canada. At the 1979 Canada Winter Games the Bramalea Blues, representing Team Ontario, won the bronze medal, playing seven games in eight days of competition.

=== 2006-07 ===
After the Royal Bank Cup upset loss to the Vernon Vipers, the Blues played like a team jinxed. With only one winning season in the last seven, the Blues were never the same.

Despite initial optimism, at the halfway point of the 2006–07 season the Blues are sitting at a dismal 1 win, 23 losses, and an overtime loss. As of November 18, the Blues are in the basement of the OPJHL and are in danger of missing the playoffs again. On January 18, 2007, the Blues, with a 1-38-1-2 record, were officially eliminated from any chance of making the playoffs. The final blow came with the Orangeville Crushers defeating the surging Newmarket Hurricanes which pushed the Crushers out of reach in the wildcard race. The Blues finished the season in last place and with one of the worst records in Tier II Junior "A" history.

=== Future of franchise ===
After folding for the 2007–08 season and almost moving to Ancaster, Ontario, the Blues announced new ownership and they returned for the 2008–09 season.

== Season-by-season results ==
Season	GP	W	L	T	OTL	GF	GA	P	Results	Playoffs
1972-73	34	13	18	3	-	148	168	29	6th Metro B	
1973-74	44	22	15	7	-	229	202	51	4th Metro B	Won League
1974-75	38	30	5	3	-	268	122	63	1st Metro B	Won League, won SC
1975-76	36	21	9	6	-	193	144	48	3rd Metro B	
1976-77	36	17	18	1	-	180	163	35	8th Metro B	
1977-78	34	11	19	4	-	145	192	26	11th Metro B	
1978-79	44	28	9	7	-	298	172	63	2nd Metro B	
1979-80	42	22	14	6	-	235	215	50	5th Metro B	
1980-81	42	17	16	9	-	179	167	43	7th Metro B	
1981-82	35	8	22	5	-	115	178	21	12th Metro B	
1982-83	36	20	10	6	-	186	131	46	3rd Metro B	
1983-84	42	24	11	7	-	237	166	55	2nd Metro B	
1984-85	36	21	9	6	-	201	139	48	5th Metro B	Won League
1985-86	35	27	5	3	-	224	121	57	2nd Metro B	Lost final
1986-87	37	16	15	6	-	194	198	38	7th Metro B	Lost quarter-final
1987-88	37	27	7	3	-	249	142	57	1st Metro B	Won League
1988-89	39	19	15	5	-	200	184	43	4th Metro B	
1989-90	44	26	10	8	-	235	155	60	4th Metro B	Lost quarter-final
1990-91	44	26	10	8	-	233	171	60	3rd Metro B	Lost final
1991-92	44	20	21	3	-	238	233	43	5th Metro A	Lost final
1992-93	48	22	22	4	-	251	243	48	7th Metro A	Lost Preliminary
1993-94	50	20	22	8	-	262	295	48	9th Metro A	Lost quarter-final
1994-95	50	17	31	2	-	199	249	36	12th Metro A	DNQ
1995-96	50	37	10	3	-	292	142	77	1st OPJHL-Me	
1996-97	51	36	12	3	-	263	154	76	1st OPJHL-Me	
1997-98	51	32	11	6	2	244	182	72	2nd OPJHL-Me	
1998-99	51	38	6	7	0	296	158	83	2nd OPJHL-W	Won League, won DHC
1999-00	49	10	33	2	4	142	217	26	10th OPJHL-W	
2000-01	49	18	23	4	4	182	206	44	8th OPJHL-W	
2001-02	49	25	19	4	1	224	209	55	4th OPJHL-W	
2002-03	49	10	35	3	1	168	282	24	9th OPJHL-W	
2003-04	49	14	30	2	3	137	223	33	8th OPJHL-W	
2004-05	49	4	44	0	1	97	381	9	10th OPJHL-W	
2005-06	49	10	36	1	2	127	278	23	9th OPJHL-W	DNQ
2006-07	49	1	45	1	2	111	360	5	10th OPJHL-W	DNQ
2007-08	Did Not Participate									
2008-09	49	11	34	-	4	170	297	26	10th OJHL-M	DNQ
2009-10	56	16	36	-	4	199	293	36	13th OJAHL	DNQ

=== Playoffs ===
MetJHL Years

- 1990 Lost quarter-final

Thornhill Thunderbirds defeated Bramalea Blues 4-games-to-2

- 1991 Lost final

Bramalea Blues defeated Richmond Hill Rams 4-games-to-1
Bramalea Blues defeated Henry Carr Crusaders 4-games-to-2
Wexford Raiders defeated Bramalea Blues 4-games-to-3

- 1992 Lost final

Bramalea Blues defeated Richmond Hill Rams 4-games-to-1
Bramalea Blues defeated Muskoka Bears 4-games-to-none
Wexford Raiders defeated Bramalea Blues 4-games-to-none

- 1993 Lost Preliminary

Aurora Eagles defeated Bramalea Blues 3-games-to-1

- 1994 Lost quarter-final

Caledon Canadians defeated Bramalea Blues 4-games-to-2

- 1995 DNQ

== Sutherland Cup appearances ==
1974: Hamilton Red Wings defeated Bramalea Blues by forfeit (No name of winner recorded on cup & caused investigation into violence in hockey)
1975: Bramalea Blues defeated Oakville Blades 4-games-to-3
1985: Waterloo Siskins defeated Bramalea Blues 4-games-to-1
1988: Waterloo Siskins defeated Bramalea Blues 4-games-to-1

== Notable alumni ==
- Luciano Borsato
- Mike Cammalleri
- Andrew Cassels
- Steve Eminger
- Sheldon Keefe
- Bob Attwell
- Ken Duggan
- Adam Hall
- Tom Laidlaw
- Mike Weaver
