= Burlington Cougars =

- City: Burlington, Ontario, Canada
- League: Ontario Junior Hockey League
- Founded: 1952
- Home arena: Central Arena
- Colours: Blue, yellow
- President: Ron Sedlbauer
- General manager: Mark Jooris
- Head coach: Mark Jooris
- Affiliates: Windsor Spitfires

Franchise history
- 1952–1955: Burlington Mohawks
- 1955–1957: Burlington Hallidays
- 1957–1960: Burlington Industrials
- 1960–1976: Burlington Mohawks
- 1976–present: Burlington Cougars

The Burlington Cougars are a Canadian junior "A" ice hockey team from Burlington, Ontario. They are a part of the Ontario Junior Hockey League.

== History ==
Founded in the early 1950s, the Burlington Mohawks found their footing in the Central Junior B Hockey League. After seven seasons in the league and two league championships, the team was transferred to the Niagara District Junior B Hockey League.

In the Niagara League, the Mohawks (briefly renamed Industrials from 57 to 60) won both the 1963 and 1964 league championships before dropping down to Junior C in 1967.

In 1970, the Mohawks jumped back up to the Junior B level in the Mid-Ontario Junior B Hockey League. They were in the league for one season before the Ontario Hockey Association shifted them back to the Central Junior B Hockey League.

The Mohawks were renamed the Cougars in 1976 and stayed in the Central League for twenty-two seasons, from 1971 until 1993.

In 1981, the Cougars won their first Central League championship since 1958. They went on to face the Stratford Cullitons of the Mid-Western Junior Hockey League in the Sutherland Cup final. The Cougars won the series 8-points-to-4 to defeat the Cullitons and claim their only Sutherland Cup.

In 1987, the Cougars won their fourth and final Central League championship.

In 1993, the Central League was promoted to become the Ontario Provincial Junior A Hockey League, the Cougars made the jump with the league. The Cougars have yet to win an OPJHL title.

The Cougars moved their home rink from Central Arena on Drury Lane to The Wave Twin Rinks on Mainway and have since returned to Central Arena.

== Season-by-season results ==
Season	GP	W	L	T	OTL	GF	GA	Pts	Results	Playoffs
1953–54	28	16	9	3	—	167	140	35	3rd OHA Gr.	
1954–55	30	19	10	1	—	164	129	39	3rd CJBHL	
1955–56	27	20	7	0	—	165	87	40	2nd CJBHL	
1956–57	27	22	4	1	—	158	83	45	1st CJBHL	Won League
1957–58	30	21	9	0	—	156	105	42	1st CJBHL	Won League
1958–59	30	18	11	1	—	142	111	37	4th CJBHL	
1959–60	31	18	10	3	—	—	—	39	2nd CJBHL	
1960–61	29	11	16	2	—	175	193	24	5th CJBHL	
1961–62	29	9	20	0	—	104	190	18	5th CJBHL	
1962–63	30	14	9	7	—	-	-	35	3rd NDJBHL	
1963–64	30	16	8	6	—	187	131	38	3rd NDJBHL	Won League
1964–65	30	14	12	4	—	161	163	32	4th NDJBHL	
1965–66	30	13	16	1	—	147	148	27	5th NDJBHL	
1966–67	29	23	6	-	—	-	-	46	1st NDJBHL	
1967–69	Statistics not available									
1969–70	30	19	10	1	—	206	149	39	3rd IntJCHL	
1970–71	34	17	13	4	—	145	152	38	4th MOJBHL	
1971–72	42	28	12	2	—	246	167	58	1st CJBHL	Won League
1972–73	42	31	6	5	—	256	147	67	1st CJBHL	Won League
1973–74	42	26	13	3	—	271	162	55	3rd CJBHL	
1974–75	42	25	6	9	—	252	190	59	2nd CJBHL	
1975–76	36	24	10	2	—	195	138	50	1st CJBHL	
1976–77	42	25	13	4	—	209	151	54	3rd CJBHL	
1977–78	42	21	16	5	—	229	194	47	3rd CJBHL	
1978–79	44	38	4	2	—	277	124	78	2nd CJBHL	
1979–80	44	31	11	2	—	213	167	64	2nd CJBHL	
1980–81	44	36	7	1	—	339	157	73	1st CJBHL	Won League, won SC
1981–82	40	29	9	2	—	292	165	60	2nd CJBHL	
1982–83	42	26	14	2	—	199	157	54	3rd CJBHL	
1983–84	40	16	20	4	—	180	207	36	5th CJBHL	
1984–85	40	21	12	7	—	205	177	49	3rd CJBHL	
1985–86	48	27	15	6	—	277	220	60	4th CJBHL	
1986–87	42	23	14	5	—	257	192	51	3rd CJBHL	Won League
1987–88	43	31	10	2	—	274	145	64	2nd CJBHL	
1988–89	42	22	12	8	—	224	168	52	5th CJBHL	
1989–90	42	24	14	4	—	201	171	52	5th CJBHL	
1990–91	42	22	16	4	—	192	186	48	6th CJBHL	
1991–92	42	21	15	6	—	173	140	48	7th CJBHL	
1992–93	49	33	13	3	—	274	212	70	3rd CJBHL	
1993–94	42	27	12	3	—	255	180	58	2nd OPJHL-W	
1994–95	49	26	19	4	—	267	212	57	4th OPJHL-W	
1995–96	50	20	28	2	—	184	199	43	4th OPJHL-Mi	
1996–97	51	14	34	3	—	188	273	32	4th OPJHL-Mi	
1997–98	51	24	22	5	0	217	207	53	3rd OPJHL-Mi	
1998–99	51	29	19	2	1	256	203	61	4th OPJHL-W	
1999–00	49	23	20	5	1	166	174	52	6th OPJHL-W	
2000–01	49	12	31	4	2	147	233	30	10th OPJHL-W	
2001–02	49	14	31	4	0	171	244	32	9th OPJHL-W	
2002–03	49	29	17	2	1	227	201	61	4th OPJHL-W	
2003–04	49	18	26	4	1	151	205	41	6th OPJHL-W	
2004–05	49	26	17	1	5	202	169	58	5th OPJHL-W	
2005–06	49	26	18	2	3	167	156	57	5th OPJHL-W	Lost Conf. Quarter-final
2006–07	49	30	12	4	3	259	158	67	5th OPJHL-W	Lost Conf. Quarter-final
2007–08	49	24	20	—	5	230	188	53	5th OPJHL-W	
2008–09	49	33	10	—	6	217	160	72	3rd OJHL-M	
2009–10	50	39	8	—	3	313	183	81	1st CCHL-W	Lost semi-final
2010–11	50	38	8	—	4	287	184	80	1st OJHL-W	Lost quarter-final
2011–12	49	20	29	—	0	161	205	40	4th OJHL-W	Lost Division Semi-final
2012–13	55	25	27	—	3	200	229	53	3rd OJHL-W	Lost Conf. Quarter-final
2013–14	53	10	37	—	6	138	272	26	5th OJHL-W	Did not qualify
2014–15	54	11	41	—	2	151	307	24	6th OJHL-W	Did not qualify
2015–16	54	40	11	3	0	249	175	83	2nd of 5 West Div. 3rd of 11 SW Conf. 5th of 22 OJHL	Won Conf. Quarter-finals, 4–1 (Jr. Canadiens); Won Conf. Semifinals, 4–3 (Blades); Lost Conf. Finals, 2–4 (Raiders)
2016–17	54	34	17	1	2	215	141	71	2nd of 5 West Div. 2nd of 11 SW Conf. 3rd of 22 OJHL	Won Conf. Quarter-finals, 4–1 (Patriots); Lost Conf. Semifinals, 1–4 (Blades)
2017–18	54	18	28	2	6	169	224	44	4th of 5 West Div. 10th of 11 SW Conf. 17th of 22 OJHL	Did not qualify
2018–19	54	27	22	3	2	185	171	59	3rd of 6 West Div. 6th of 11 SW Conf. 14th of 22 OJHL	Lost Conf. Quarter-finals, 3–4 (Jr. Sabres)
2019-20	54	34	12	4	4	226	153	76	2nd of 6 West Div. 2nd of 11 NW Conf. 5th of 21 OJHL	Lost Conf. Quarter-finals, 2–4 (Jr. Sabres)
2020-21	Season cancelled due to COVID-19									
2021-22	54	39	12	2	1	230	139	76	1st of 6 West Div. 2nd of 10 NW Conf. 2nd of 21 OJHL	Won Conf. Quarter-finals, 2–0 (Blades); Lost Conf. Semifinals, 0–2 (Menace)
2022-23	54	38	12	1	2	157	162	79	3rd of 10 NW Conf. 5th of 21 OJHL	Won Conf. Quarter-finals, 4–0 (Royals); Won Conf. Semifinals, 4-0 (Raiders); Lost Conf Finals 1-4 (Blues)
2023-24	56	29	20	1	6	212	191	65	7th of 12 NW Conf. 15th of 24 OJHL	Lost Conf. Quarter-finals, 1-4 (Menace)
2024-25	56	31	20	3	2	236	193	67	6th of 12 West Conf. 11th of 24 OJHL	Lost Conf. Quarter-finals, 0-4 (Menace)

=== Playoffs ===
- 1994 Lost quarter-final

Burlington Cougars defeated Georgetown Raiders 4-games-to-none
Oakville Blades defeated Burlington Cougars 4-games-to-none

- 1995 Lost Preliminary

Brampton Capitals defeated Burlington Cougars 4-games-to-1

- 1996 Did not qualify
- 1997 Did not qualify
- 1998 Lost Preliminary

Oakville Blades defeated Burlington Cougars 4-games-to-2

- 1999 Lost Division Quarter-final

Georgetown Raiders defeated Burlington Cougars 3-games-to-1

- 2000 Lost Division Semi-final

Burlington Cougars defeated Milton Merchants 4-games-to-3
Georgetown Raiders defeated Burlington Cougars 4-games-to-3

- 2001 Did not qualify
- 2002 Did not qualify
- 2003 Lost Division Quarter-final

Oakville Blades defeated Burlington Cougars 4-games-to-none

- 2004 Lost Division Quarter-final

Oakville Blades defeated Burlington Cougars 4-games-to-none

- 2005 Lost Division Quarter-final

Milton Icehawks defeated Burlington Cougars 4-games-to-1

- 2006 Lost Division Quarter-final

Oakville Blades defeated Burlington Cougars 4-games-to-1

- 2007 Lost Division Quarter-final

Georgetown Raiders defeated Burlington Cougars 4-games-to-2

- 2008 Lost Division Quarter-final

Brampton Capitals defeated Burlington Cougars 3-games-to-none

- 2009 Lost Division Semi-final

Burlington Cougars defeated Milton Icehawks 3-games-to-none
Oakville Blades defeated Burlington Cougars 4-games-to-1

- 2010 Lost CCHL Semi-final

Burlington Cougars defeated North York Rangers 4-games-to-none
Burlington Cougars defeated Streetsville Derbys 4-games-to-none
Newmarket Hurricanes defeated Burlington Cougars 4-games-to-none

- 2011 Lost quarter-final

Burlington Cougars defeated Hamilton Red Wings 4-games-to-none
Oakville Blades defeated Burlington Cougars 4-games-to-2

- 2012 Lost Division Semi-final

Burlington Cougars defeated Milton Icehawks 3-games-to-1
Georgetown Raiders defeated Burlington Cougars 4-games-to-1

== Sutherland Cup appearances ==
1981: Burlington Cougars defeated Stratford Cullitons 8-points-to-4

== Notable alumni ==
- Kevin Bieksa
- Tim Bothwell
- Eric Cairns
- Greg Carey
- Paul Crowley
- Dan Currie
- Bob Dillabough
- Steve Durbano
- Paul Henderson
- Larry Jeffrey
- Jeff Johnson (running back - CFL)
- Josh Jooris
- Rick Lanz
- Mark Lawrence
- Lowell MacDonald
- Pit Martin
- Scott McKay
- John Miszuk
- Lance Nethery
- Danny Olesevich
- Murray Oliver
- Pat Quinn
- Dennis Ribant (pitcher - MLB)
- Wayne Rivers
- Ron Sedlbauer
- Fred Speck
- Steve Valiquette
- Mark Visheau
- Chad Wiseman
- Dino Felicetti
