= 1996–97 OPJHL season =

- League: Ontario Provincial Junior A Hockey League
- Sport: Hockey
- Duration: Regular season 1996-09 – 1997-02; Playoffs; 1997-02 – 1997-04
- Number of teams: 22
- Finals champions: Milton Merchants

OPJHL seasons
- ← 1995–96 1997–98 →

The 1996–97 OPJHL season is the fourth season of the Ontario Provincial Junior A Hockey League (OPJHL). The twenty-two teams of the MacKenzie, MacKinnon, Phillips, and Ruddock Divisions competed in a 51-game schedule. The top 4 teams of each division make the playoffs.

The winner of the OPJHL playoffs, the Milton Merchants, lost the 1997 Buckland Cup and Dudley Hewitt Cup to the Rayside-Balfour Sabrecats of the Northern Ontario Junior Hockey League.

== Changes ==
- Royal York Royals become the Vaughan Vipers.
- Stouffville Clippers become the Stouffville Spirit.

== Final standings ==
Note: GP = Games played; W = Wins; L = Losses; OTL = Overtime losses; SL = Shootout losses; GF = Goals for; GA = Goals against; PTS = Points; x = clinched playoff berth; y = clinched division title; z = clinched conference title

MacKenzie Division
| Team | GP | W | L | T | GF | GA | P |
| Bramalea Blues | 51 | 36 | 12 | 3 | 263 | 154 | 76 |
| Brampton Capitals | 51 | 35 | 14 | 2 | 280 | 183 | 73 |
| Mississauga Chargers | 51 | 29 | 19 | 3 | 234 | 220 | 62 |
| St. Michael's Buzzers | 51 | 26 | 22 | 3 | 210 | 173 | 59 |
| Streetsville Derbys | 51 | 19 | 26 | 6 | 212 | 222 | 45 |
| Vaughan Vipers | 51 | 16 | 33 | 2 | 179 | 272 | 35 |
MacKinnon Division
| Team | GP | W | L | T | GF | GA | P |
| Milton Merchants | 51 | 37 | 9 | 5 | 319 | 169 | 81 |
| Hamilton Kilty | 51 | 32 | 14 | 5 | 286 | 218 | 70 |
| Oakville Blades | 51 | 22 | 28 | 1 | 218 | 233 | 50 |
| Burlington Cougars | 51 | 14 | 34 | 3 | 188 | 273 | 32 |
| Georgetown Raiders | 51 | 3 | 47 | 1 | 140 | 375 | 10 |
Phillips Division
| Team | GP | W | L | T | GF | GA | P |
| Newmarket 87's | 51 | 43 | 5 | 3 | 313 | 135 | 89 |
| Collingwood Blues | 51 | 28 | 18 | 5 | 249 | 206 | 62 |
| Orillia Terriers | 50 | 25 | 21 | 4 | 201 | 194 | 56 |
| Lindsay Muskies | 51 | 17 | 29 | 5 | 188 | 247 | 42 |
| Stouffville Spirit | 50 | 8 | 41 | 1 | 167 | 295 | 19 |
Ruddock Division
| Team | GP | W | L | T | GF | GA | P |
| Kingston Voyageurs | 51 | 42 | 7 | 2 | 313 | 138 | 87 |
| Peterborough Jr. Petes | 51 | 29 | 19 | 3 | 219 | 182 | 64 |
| Ajax Axemen | 51 | 21 | 28 | 2 | 212 | 258 | 45 |
| Bowmanville Eagles | 51 | 15 | 31 | 5 | 215 | 285 | 37 |
| Trenton Sting | 51 | 16 | 32 | 3 | 192 | 278 | 36 |
| Cobourg Cougars | 51 | 11 | 35 | 5 | 190 | 278 | 29 |

== 1996-97 OPJHL Playoffs ==
Division Semi-final

Newmarket 87's defeated Bowmanville Eagles 4-games-to-2
Kingston Voyageurs defeated Ajax Axemen 4-games-to-none
Peterborough Jr. Petes defeated Lindsay Muskies 4-games-to-2
Collingwood Blues defeated Orillia Terriers 4-games-to-2
Milton Merchants defeated Streetsville Derbys 4-games-to-none
Brampton Capitals defeated St. Michael's Buzzers 4-games-to-2
Mississauga Chargers defeated Hamilton Kiltys 4-games-to-2

Division Final

Newmarket 87's defeated Collingwood Blues 4-games-to-none
Kingston Voyageurs defeated Peterborough Jr. Petes 4-games-to-1
Milton Merchants defeated Mississauga Chargers 4-games-to-none
Bramalea Blues defeated Brampton Capitals 4-games-to-2

Semi-final

Newmarket 87's defeated Kingston Voyageurs 4-games-to-1
Milton Merchants defeated Bramalea Blues 4-games-to-3

Final

Milton Merchants defeated Newmarket 87's 4-games-to-3

== OHA Buckland Cup and Dudley Hewitt Cup Championship ==
Best-of-7

Rayside-Balfour Sabrecats (NOJHL) defeated Milton Merchants 4-games-to-1

Milton 4 - Rayside-Balfour 0
Rayside-Balfour 4 - Milton 3 OT
Rayside-Balfour 5 - Milton 3
Rayside-Balfour 9 - Milton 2
Rayside-Balfour 4 - Milton 1

== Scoring leaders ==
Note: GP = Games played; G = Goals; A = Assists; Pts = Points; PIM = Penalty minutes

| Player | Team | GP | G | A | Pts |
|---|---|---|---|---|---|
| Ryan Vince | Kingston Voyageurs | 51 | 54 | 81 | 135 |
| Scott Cameron | Kingston Voyageurs | 48 | 51 | 61 | 112 |
| Eric Ellis | Hamilton Red Wings | 50 | 50 | 62 | 112 |
| Dan Kerluke | Brampton Capitals | 51 | 62 | 48 | 110 |
| Ron Baker | Milton/Bowmanville | 49 | 43 | 62 | 105 |
| Scott Stephens | Newmarket 87's | 44 | 43 | 60 | 103 |
| Chris Stevenson | Hamilton Red Wings | 51 | 51 | 49 | 100 |
| Darren Haydar | Milton Merchants | 51 | 32 | 68 | 100 |

== See also ==
- 1997 Royal Bank Cup
- Dudley Hewitt Cup
- List of OJHL seasons
- Northern Ontario Junior Hockey League
- Superior International Junior Hockey League
- Greater Ontario Junior Hockey League
- 1996 in ice hockey
- 1997 in ice hockey

| Preceded by 1995–96 OPJHL season | OJHL seasons | Succeeded by 1997–98 OPJHL season |
