= Newmarket Hurricanes =

- City: Newmarket, Ontario, Canada
- League: Ontario Junior Hockey League
- Founded: 1972
- Folded: 2019
- Home arena: Ray Twinney Complex
- Colours: Black & red
- Owner(s): Anthony Cella; Tony Comparelli
- General manager: Eric Cella
- Head coach: Tom Longland
- Affiliate: Georgina Ice (COJCHL)

Franchise history
- 1972–1975: Seneca Flyers
- 1975–1986: Newmarket Flyers
- 1987–1997: Newmarket 87's
- 1997–2019: Newmarket Hurricanes
- 2019–present: Milton Menace

The Newmarket Hurricanes were a junior ice hockey franchise in the Ontario Junior Hockey League (OJHL) based in Newmarket, Ontario. The franchise existed from 1972 until 2019, based in Newmarket starting in 1975.

== History ==
In 1972, the Seneca Flyers became a part of the OPJHL. In 1975, they bought out the Newmarket Redmen of the Mid-Ontario Junior B Hockey League and moved to become the Newmarket Flyers. The Redmen dated back to the 1920s and were at one point a top level Junior "C" team.

Although the official story is that the Hurricanes got their start in the late 1980s as the Newmarket 87's, the franchise that spawned this team existed long before it. In 1986, the Newmarket Flyers folded. The OHA Junior "A" league was on rocky footing in the late 1980s and was no longer cost efficient for most member teams. Sensing the demise of the league, the Flyers went on hiatus. The league folded in 1987, their last champions happened to be the longtime Junior "B" team: Owen Sound Greys. As more Junior A teams had folded from the OHA-A, the more Junior "B" teams came in to fill the void. As the league ran almost completely out of original Junior "A" teams, the league decided it would be best to fold. The result was a mass expansion of local Junior "B" leagues—filling with both still-active teams and teams that had folded due to problems in the OHA-A. Newmarket pulled its franchise back together and joined the Central Junior "B" Hockey League as the 87's. After 1997, the 87's became the Hurricanes.

The 87's never did very well as a member of the Central "B", but no team exactly stacked up well to the powerhouse Barrie Colts who most notably pulled off an undefeated season in 1992-93. After the formation of the Ontario Provincial Junior "A" league in 1993, things started clicking for the franchise. They have never ranked less than 10th in a 37 team league, with 3 first place finishes in the regular season. They have also pulled off three seasons with less than 10 losses in the OPJHL.

Their best season was the 1995-96 season, after the Colts expanded into the Ontario Hockey League. The 87's finished in third place, won the Buckland Cup as league champions, and then took the Dudley Hewitt Cup as Central Canadian Junior "A" Champions. At the inaugural Royal Bank Cup in 1996 at Melfort, Saskatchewan, the 87's finished off in the round robin in second place with a 2-2 record. They defeated the BCHL's Vernon Vipers 7-5 in their first game. They then took out the SJHL's Yorkton Terriers 5-2. In the third game, the 87's were up against the only other undefeated team—the host, the SJHL's Melfort Mustangs. The Mustangs deflated the high-flying 87's with an 11-3 blow-out. Melfort finished perfect in the round robin, but the 87's lost to the MJAHL's Moncton Beavers, 4-3, the first win for the Beavers in the tournament. The Moncton victory still left them eliminated from the tournament. Also, due to a tie breaker the 87's were still in second place. They ended up playing the Vipers again in the semi-final and lost by an uninspired score of 7-4. The Vipers knocked off the undefeated Mustangs 2-0 in the final.

In the 2005-06 season, the Hurricanes finished 7th overall in the league and 2nd place in the North Division with 32 wins. The Canes opened the playoffs with a 4 games to 1 series victory of the inconsistent Huntsville-Muskoka Otters. The Canes played the division semi-final against the Stouffville Spirit. The Spirit won the series in 6 games, beat the Aurora Tigers for the division title in 6 games, beat the Oakville Blades in 7 games in the Buckland Cup semi-final, but were out-lasted by the defending champion St. Michael's Buzzers 4 games to 2 in the league final.

On June 28, 2008 the Newmarket Hurricanes lost a key part of their team. Player KJ Ramolla died as a passenger in a single car rollover. Ramolla was 5th for scoring during the 2007-2008 season and was set to return for the 2008-2009 season. The driver of the car, Ryan Burkholder, former captain of the Hurricanes survived the crash with minor injuries.

Newmarket hosted the 2008 Dudley Hewitt Cup, losing to the OJHL Champion Oakville Blades in the Final.

In March 2019, the OJHL franchise was bought and moved to Milton. The team became the Milton Menace.

== Season-by-season results ==
Season	GP	W	L	T	OTL	GF	GA	P	Results	Playoffs
Seneca Flyers
1972-73	44	16	19	9	-	214	241	41	8th OPJHL	
1973-74	44	24	11	9	-	249	187	57	4th OPJHL	
1974-75	44	27	12	5	-	251	184	59	1st OPJHL	
Newmarket Flyers
1975-76	44	18	22	4	-	211	211	40	8th OPJHL	
1976-77	44	13	23	8	-	207	249	34	11th OPJHL	
1977-78	50	16	26	8	-	239	252	40	9th OPJHL	
1978-79	50	19	25	6	-	223	249	44	6th OPJHL	
1979-80	44	7	33	4	-	156	324	18	11th OPJHL	
1980-81	44	16	28	0	-	210	290	32	10th OPJHL	
1981-82	50	20	24	6	-	287	298	46	5th OJHL	
1982-83	48	19	27	2	-	228	256	40	8th OJHL	
1983-84	42	20	16	6	-	247	239	46	4th OJHL	
1984-85	48	26	17	5	-	304	255	57	3rd OJHL	
1985-86	50	21	19	10	-	237	226	52	4th OJHL	
1986-87	Did Not Participate									
Newmarket 87s
1987-88	44	9	27	8	-	187	249	26	11th CJBHL	
1988-89	42	32	8	2	-	254	148	66	1st CJBHL	
1989-90	42	26	11	5	-	173	124	57	3rd CJBHL	
1990-91	42	10	28	4	-	144	226	24	13th CJBHL	
1991-92	42	9	31	2	-	137	240	20	15th CJBHL	
1992-93	48	23	21	4	-	257	236	51	8th CJBHL	
1993-94	40	24	14	2	-	240	172	53	2nd OPJHL-E	
1994-95	48	35	11	2	-	314	183	75	1st OPJHL-E	
1995-96	50	40	9	1	-	298	163	83	1st OPJHL-P	Won League, won DHC
1996-97	51	43	5	3	-	313	135	89	1st OPJHL-P	
Newmarket Hurricanes
1997-98	51	28	17	5	1	249	185	62	2nd OPJHL-P	
1998-99	51	36	11	4	0	256	144	76	3rd OPJHL-C	
1999-00	49	37	10	1	1	296	167	76	1st OPJHL-N	
2000-01	49	37	7	2	3	284	145	79	2nd OPJHL-N	
2001-02	49	35	12	2	0	232	112	72	1st OPJHL-N	
2002-03	49	31	14	1	3	221	163	66	2nd OPJHL-N	
2003-04	49	34	13	2	0	202	122	70	2nd OPJHL-N	
2004-05	49	33	15	0	1	207	163	67	2nd OPJHL-N	
2005-06	48	32	12	3	1	217	129	68	2nd OPJHL-N	Lost Conf. SF
2006-07	49	17	29	2	1	157	203	37	5th OPJHL-N	Lost Conf. SF
2007-08	49	41	6	-	2	236	112	84	2nd OPJHL-N	
2008-09	53	28	20	-	5	198	193	61	5th OJHL-C	
2009-10	50	32	12	-	6	165	123	70	2nd CCHL-W	Won League, lost OHA Final
2010-11	50	40	7	-	3	226	116	83	1st OJHL-N	Lost quarter-final
2011-12	49	37	7	-	5	212	116	79	1st OJHL-N	Lost Division Final
2012-13	55	29	19	-	7	169	148	65	2nd OJHL-N	Lost final
2013-14	53	25	26	-	2	191	211	52	2nd OJHL-N	Lost Conf. Quarter-final
2014-15	-	-	-	-	-	-	-	-	-	-
2015-16	54	23	22	3	6	161	161	55	3rd of 6 Nor Div; 8th of 11 NE Conf; 15th of 22 OJHL	Lost Conf. Quarters 0-4 (Golden Hawks)
2016-17	54	22	26	2	4	160	200	50	3rd of 6 Nor Div; 8th of 11 NE Conf; 16th of 22 OJHL	Lost Conf. Quarters 2-4 (Golden Hawks)
2017-18	54	33	14	6	1	178	112	73	2nd of 6 Nor Div; 3rd of 11 NE Conf; 7th of 22 OJHL	Won Conf. Quarters 4-2 (Royals); Lost Conf Semifinal 3-4 (Dukes)
2018-19	54	26	20	3	5	145	120	60	2nd of 5 Nor Div; 4th of 11 NE Conf; 11th of 22 OJHL	Won Conf. Quarters 4-1 (Tigers); Lost Conf Semifinal 3-4 (Waxers)

Franchise sold - see Milton Menace

=== Playoffs ===
Original OPJHL

- 1973 Lost quarter-final

Dixie Beehives defeated Seneca Flyers 4-games-to-3

- 1974 Lost quarter-final

Aurora Tigers defeated Seneca Flyers 4-games-to-2

- 1975 Lost semi-final

Seneca Flyers defeated North Bay Trappers 4-games-to-2
Toronto Nationals defeated Seneca Flyers 4-games-to-none

- 1976 Lost Preliminary

Weston Dodgers defeated Newmarket Flyers 3-games-to-2

- 1977 DNQ
- 1978 Lost quarter-final

Royal York Royals defeated Newmarket Flyers 4-games-to-2

- 1979 Lost quarter-final

North Bay Trappers defeated Newmarket Flyers 4-games-to-2

- 1980 DNQ
- 1981 DNQ
- 1982 Lost quarter-final

Richmond Hill Rams defeated Newmarket Flyers 4-games-to-3

- 1983 Lost semi-final

Newmarket Flyers defeated Richmond Hill Rams 4-games-to-3
Orillia Travelways defeated Newmarket Flyers 4-games-to-3

- 1984 Lost semi-final

Newmarket Flyers defeated Hamilton Mountain A's 4-games-to-none
Dixie Beehives defeated Newmarket Flyers 4-games-to-3

- 1985 Lost semi-final

Newmarket Flyers defeated Richmond Hill Dynes 4-games-to-2
Aurora Tigers defeated Newmarket Flyers 4-games-to-3

- 1986 Lost semi-final

Orillia Travelways defeated Newmarket Flyers 4-games-to-1

OJHL Years

- 1994 Lost semi-final

Newmarket 87's defeated Peterborough Jr. Petes 4-games-to-none
Newmarket 87's defeated Barrie Colts 4-games-to-1
Orillia Terriers defeated Newmarket 87's 4-games-to-1

- 1995 Lost semi-final

Newmarket 87's defeated Peterborough Jr. Petes 4-games-to-none
Newmarket 87's defeated Cobourg Cougars 4-games-to-none
Barrie Colts defeated Newmarket 87's 4-games-to-3

- 1996 Won League, won OHA Buckland Cup, won OHF Ruddock Trophy, won Dudley Hewitt Cup, lost 1996 Royal Bank Cup semi-final

Newmarket 87's defeated Cobourg Cougars 4-games-to-3
Newmarket 87's defeated Orillia Terriers 4-games-to-1
Newmarket 87's defeated Lindsay Muskies 4-games-to-3
Newmarket 87's defeated Brampton Capitals 4-games-to-2 OPJHL CHAMPIONS
Second in Dudley Hewitt Cup round robin (2-2) RUDDUCK TROPHY CHAMPIONS
Newmarket 87's defeated Thunder Bay Flyers (USHL) 6-3 in semi-final
Newmarket 87's defeated Brampton Capitals 8-2 in final BUCKLAND CUP, DUDLEY HEWITT CUP CHAMPIONS
Second in 1996 Royal Bank Cup round robin (2-2)
Vernon Vipers (BCHL) defeated Newmarket 87's 7-4 in semi-final

- 1997 Lost final

Newmarket 87's defeated Bowmanville Eagles 4-games-to-2
Newmarket 87's defeated Collingwood Blues 4-games-to-none
Newmarket 87's defeated Kingston Voyageurs 4-games-to-1
Milton Merchants defeated Newmarket 87's 4-games-to-3

- 1998 Lost quarter-final

Newmarket Hurricanes defeated Aurora Tigers 4-games-to-1
Couchiching Terriers defeated Newmarket Hurricanes 4-games-to-1

- 1999 Lost Division Semi-final

Newmarket Hurricanes defeated Wexford Raiders 3-games-to-1
Couchiching Terriers defeated Newmarket Hurricanes 4-games-to-1

- 2000 Lost Division Semi-final

Newmarket Hurricanes defeated Wexford Raiders 3-games-to-1
Couchiching Terriers defeated Newmarket Hurricanes 4-games-to-1

- 2001 Lost Division Final

Newmarket Hurricanes defeated Durham Huskies 4-games-to-none
Newmarket Hurricanes defeated Collingwood Blues 4-games-to-1
Couchiching Terriers defeated Newmarket Hurricanes 4-games-to-3

- 2002 Lost Division Final

Newmarket Hurricanes defeated Huntsville Wildcats 4-games-to-none
Newmarket Hurricanes defeated Collingwood Blues 4-games-to-1
Aurora Tigers defeated Newmarket Hurricanes 4-games-to-none

- 2003 Lost Division Semi-final

Newmarket Hurricanes defeated Ajax Axemen 4-games-to-1
Stouffville Spirit defeated Newmarket Hurricanes 4-games-to-3

- 2004 Lost Division Final

Newmarket Hurricanes defeated Pickering Panthers 4-games-to-none
Newmarket Hurricanes defeated Stouffville Spirit 4-games-to-1
Aurora Tigers defeated Newmarket Hurricanes 4-games-to-none

- 2005 Lost Division Final

Newmarket Hurricanes defeated Streetsville Derbys 4-games-to-none
Newmarket Hurricanes defeated Stouffville Spirit 4-games-to-2
Aurora Tigers defeated Newmarket Hurricanes 4-games-to-2

- 2006 Lost Division Semi-final

Newmarket Hurricanes defeated Huntsville-Muskoka Otters 4-games-to-1
Stouffville Spirit defeated Newmarket Hurricanes 4-games-to-2

- 2007 Lost Division Semi-final

Newmarket Hurricanes defeated Huntsville-Muskoka Otters 4-games-to-1
Aurora Tigers defeated Newmarket Hurricanes 4-games-to-2

- 2008 Lost Division Semi-final, Hosted and Lost Dudley Hewitt Cup Final

Aurora Tigers defeated Newmarket Hurricanes 4-games-to-1
Second in Dudley Hewitt Cup round robin (2-1)
Newmarket Hurricanes defeated Dryden Ice Dogs (SIJHL) 2-1 OT in semi-final
Oakville Blades defeated Newmarket Hurricanes 6-3 in final

- 2009 Lost Division Semi-final

Newmarket Hurricanes defeated Hamilton Red Wings 4-games-to-1
Wellington Dukes defeated Newmarket Hurricanes 4-games-to-none

- 2010 Won CCHL, lost OHA Buckland Cup

Newmarket Hurricanes defeated St. Michael's Buzzers 4-games-to-1
Newmarket Hurricanes defeated Hamilton Red Wings 4-games-to-none
Newmarket Hurricanes defeated Burlington Cougars 4-games-to-none
Newmarket Hurricanes defeated Bowmanville Eagles 4-games-to-2 CCHL CHAMPIONS
Oakville Blades (OJAHL) defeated Newmarket Hurricanes 4-games-to-2

- 2011 Lost quarter-final

Newmarket Hurricanes defeated Orangeville Flyers 4-games-to-1
Stouffville Spirit defeated Newmarket Hurricanes 4-games-to-3

- 2012 Lost quarter-final

Newmarket Hurricanes defeated Markham Waxers 4-games-to-2
Stouffville Spirit defeated Newmarket Hurricanes 4-games-to-3

- 2013 Lost final

Newmarket Hurricanes defeated Whitby Fury 4-games-to-2
Newmarket Hurricanes defeated Lindsay Muskies 4-games-to-0
Newmarket Hurricanes defeated Kingston Voyageurs 4-games-to-3
St. Michael's Buzzers defeated Newmarket Hurricanes 4-games-to-3

== Newmarket Redmen ==
Newmarket Redmen
- City: Newmarket, Ontario, Canada
- League: Mid-Ontario Junior B Hockey League; Suburban Junior C Hockey League; Metro Junior B Hockey League
- Founded: 1955-1975
- Colors: Red, Black, and White

Franchise history
- 1955-1960: Newmarket Smoke Rings
- 1960-1975: Newmarket Redmen
- 1975: merged w/ Seneca Flyers

The Newmarket Redmen and Newmarket Smoke Rings were different names of a Canadian junior hockey franchise that won four Clarence Schmalz Cups as Ontario Hockey Association Junior C champions. Based in Newmarket, Ontario, alongside rival Aurora Tigers, the (Smoke Rings or Smokies) spent their time in the Suburban Junior C Group. They changed their name to the Redmen in 1960 when the team accepted promotion to the Metro Junior B Hockey League.

Formed in 1955 as a Junior C team in the Suburban Junior C Group, the Smoke Rings would win provincial titles in three of their first four seasons (1956, 1958, and 1959).

From 1961 to 1970, the Redmen played in the newly formed Suburban Junior C Hockey League. In 1970, after winning a fourth provincial title, the team became a founding member of the Mid-Ontario Junior B Hockey League. After five seasons at Junior B, the Newmarket Redmen merged with the Seneca Flyers to form the Junior A Newmarket Flyers.

=== Statistics ===
Season	GP	W	L	T	OTL	GF	GA	P	Results	Playoffs
Newmarket Smoke Rings
1955-56	22	19	3	0	-	--	--	38	1st Sub C	Won League, won CSC
1956-57	20	13	7	0	-	--	--	26	2nd Sub C	Lost final
1957-58	26	18	8	0	-	--	--	36	2nd Sub C	Won League, won CSC
1958-59	23	17	6	0	-	--	--	34	2nd Sub C	Won League, won CSC
1959-60	18	10	7	1	-	--	--	21	2nd Sub C	Lost final
Newmarket Redmen
1960-61	26	8	16	2	-	106	149	18	7th Metro B	DNQ
1961-62	22	7	13	2	-	--	--	16	4th LBFJCHL	
1962-63	21	7	13	1	-	--	--	15	5th SubJCHL	Lost semi-final
1963-64	28	15	12	1	-	--	--	31	4th SubJCHL	Lost semi-final
1964-65	26	10	14	2	-	--	--	22	5th SubJCHL	Lost semi-final
1965-66	32	21	10	1	-	--	--	37	2nd SubJCHL	
1966-67	30	3	26	1	-	81	196	7	6th SubJCHL	
1967-68	30	13	12	5	-	--	--	31	6th SubJCHL	Lost semi-final
1968-69	36	23	7	6	-	--	--	52	2nd SubJCHL	Lost semi-final
1969-70	34	29	4	1	-	223	101	59	1st SubJCHL	Won League, won CSC
1970-71	34	20	12	2	-	174	136	42	2nd MOJBHL	
1971-72	40	10	28	2	-	141	223	22	5th MOJBHL	
1972-73	40	14	23	3	-	153	222	31	5th MOJBHL	
1973-74	39	6	31	2	-	133	259	14	6th MOJBHL	DNQ
1974-75	40	10	26	4	-	154	212	24	6th MOJBHL	DNQ

== Clarence Schmalz Cup appearances ==
1956: Newmarket Smoke Rings defeated Stamford Bruins 3-games-to-none
1958: Newmarket Smoke Rings defeated Fort Erie 4-games-to-1
1959: Newmarket Smoke Rings defeated Fort Erie 4-games-to-2
1962: Elmira Polar Kings defeated Newmarket Redmen 4-games-to-none
1970: Newmarket Redmen defeated Hespeler Shamrocks 4-games-to-none

== Notable alumni ==
- Jeff Beukeboom
- B.J. Crombeen
- Travis Dermott
- Rob Dopson
- Dan Ellis
- Dave Gagner
- Lee Giffin
- Mike Glumac
- Ernie Godden
- Steven Halko
- Jeff Jackson
- Curtis Joseph
- Claude Julien
- Mike Keating
- Corey Locke
- Jamie Macoun
- Darrin Madeley
- David McIntyre
- Chris McRae
- Wayne Rutledge
- Geoff Sarjeant
- John Stevens
- Paul Ysebaert
- Zack Stortini
- Quinton Byfield
- Max Birbraer

== Sources ==
- Cudmore, John (14 July 2016). "GM Eric Cella's vision of Newmarket Hurricanes' future starts now". YorkRegion.com.
- Cudmore, John (3 April 2019). "Original owners reflect on building Newmarket Hurricanes franchise". YorkRegion.com.
- "OJHL franchise team testing waters for move to Newmarket". NewmarketToday.ca. 9 January 2025.
- Quigley, Joseph (30 June 2025). "Newmarket getting OJHL team for first time in six years". NewmarketToday.ca.
- "OJHL's Jr. Canadiens franchise moving to Newmarket from Toronto". ojhl.ca (Press release). Ontario Junior Hockey League. 1 July 2025.
