= Markham Royals =

- City: Markham, Ontario, Canada
- League: Ontario Junior Hockey League
- Division: West
- Founded: 1973
- Home arena: Markham Centennial Centre 2015–present (Markham); Dave Andreychuk Mountain Arena 1973–2015 (Hamilton)
- Colours: Blue, and White
- Owner: Stuart Hyman
- General manager: Mike Galati
- Head coach: Mike Galati

Franchise history
- 1973–1975: Hamilton Red Wings
- 1975–1976: Hamilton Mountain A's
- 1977–2002: Hamilton Kilty B's
- 2002–2015: Hamilton Red Wings
- 2015–present: Markham Royals

Current uniform

The Markham Royals are a Junior "A" ice hockey team from Markham, Ontario, Canada. They are a part of the Ontario Junior Hockey League. From 1973 until 2015, the team operated in Hamilton, Ontario as the Kilty's and the Red Wings.

== History ==
=== Hamilton Red Wings/Kilty B's (1973–2015) ===
The Red Wings were founded in 1973 as the second Hamilton-based team in the Niagara District Junior B Hockey League. After one season, the league divided into two leagues and the Red Wings went the way of the Golden Horseshoe Junior Hockey League. In 1975–76, the other Hamilton team joined the Southern Ontario Junior A Hockey League and became the Hamilton Mountain A's. The draw of a local Junior A club weakened the team and they took a one-year leave a season later.

In 1977, under new ownership the team came back as the Kiltys. Although a very competitive team, it took the Kiltys until 1992–93 to win a Golden Horseshoe championship. With that win, the Kiltys were promoted to the newly formed Ontario Provincial Junior A Hockey League with a variety of other Junior B squads. Outside of some brief troubles in the late 1990s, the Hamilton franchise has been very successful in regular season play in the OJHL. The team was renamed the Hamilton Red Wings in 2002 and continued to field highly competitive teams season after season.

=== Markham Royals (2015–present) ===
In early 2015, the Red Wings moved to Markham, Ontario and became the Markham Royals. Markham had been without an OJHL franchise since 2012. The club also acquired the rights for Waxers Junior A, and has chosen to play as the Markham Royals.

== Season-by-season results ==
1974 – 2015 History – (Hamilton) is hidden click to
Season	GP	W	L	T	OTL	GF	GA	P	Results	Playoffs
1974–75	40	24	11	5	-	223	161	53	2nd GHJHL	
1975–76	40	19	12	9	-	212	186	47	2nd GHJHL	
1976–77	Did Not Participate									
1977–78	40	16	20	4	-	203	213	36	4th GHJHL	
1978–79	42	25	12	5	-	235	171	55	3rd GHJHL	
1979–80	44	33	6	5	-	285	150	71	1st GHJHL	
1980–81	42	19	17	6	-	180	159	44	4th GHJHL	
1981–82	35	17	13	5	-	-	-	39	4th GHJHL	
1982–83	42	20	17	5	-	194	184	45	4th GHJHL	
1983–84	42	25	10	7	-	206	144	57	2nd GHJHL	
1984–85	42	16	18	8	-	190	198	40	6th GHJHL	
1985–86	40	15	24	1	-	199	223	31	8th GHJHL	
1986–87	42	14	22	6	-	208	233	34	6th GHJHL	
1987–88	42	10	28	4	-	218	283	24	7th GHJHL	
1988–89	42	15	16	11	-	185	201	41	5th GHJHL	
1989–90	48	26	18	3	1	265	246	56	4th GHJHL	
1990–91	42	20	16	5	1	221	200	46	5th GHJHL	
1991–92	42	25	15	0	2	218	175	52	4th GHJHL	
1992–93	42	32	8	1	1	294	159	66	1st GHJHL	Won League
1993–94	42	32	8	2	-	265	172	66	1st OPJHL-W	
1994–95	49	28	16	5	-	249	195	62	3rd OPJHL-W	
1995–96	50	25	17	8	-	241	206	60	2nd OPJHL-Mi	
1996–97	51	32	14	5	-	286	218	70	2nd OPJHL-Mi	
1997–98	51	21	22	5	3	222	195	50	4th OPJHL-Mi	
1998–99	51	19	26	6	0	191	231	44	8th OPJHL-W	
1999-00	49	25	17	5	2	247	206	57	5th OPJHL-W	
2000–01	49	21	22	4	2	174	204	48	7th OPJHL-W	
2001–02	49	34	12	2	1	237	156	71	2nd OPJHL-W	
2002–03	49	38	8	2	1	286	157	79	3rd OPJHL-W	
2003–04	49	33	13	1	2	254	161	69	2nd OPJHL-W	
2004–05	49	31	13	2	3	194	149	67	3rd OPJHL-W	
2005–06	49	33	14	1	1	204	124	68	2nd OPJHL-W	Lost Conf. Final
2006–07	49	37	8	2	2	270	129	78	3rd OPJHL-W	Lost semi-final
2007–08	49	31	16	-	2	255	183	64	3rd OPJHL-W	
2008–09	53	28	18	-	7	281	245	63	4th OJHL-C	
2009–10	50	31	16	-	3	204	163	65	3rd CCHL-W	Lost quarter-final
2010–11	50	29	18	-	3	236	175	61	4th OJHL-W	Lost Round of 16
2011–12	49	17	27	-	5	176	241	39	6th OJHL-W	Lost Division QF
2012–13	55	5	49	-	1	162	394	11	6th OJHL-W	DNQ
2013–14	53	18	31	-	4	156	227	40	4th OJHL-W	DNQ
2014–15	-	-	-	-	-	-	-	-	-	-

2020 – current History
2015–16	54	31	17	3	3	197	149	68	1st of 6 Nor Div; 3rd of 11 NE Conf; 7th of 22 OJHL	Won Conf. Quarters 4–1 (Fury); Lost Conf. Semifinals 0–4 (Voyageurs)
2016–17	54	30	20	1	3	187	170	64	1st of 6 Nor Div; 6th of 11 NE Conf; 9th of 22 OJHL	Lost Conf. Quarters 2–4 (Spirit)
2017–18	54	26	22	1	5	199	195	58	3rd of 6 Nor Div; 6th of 11 NE Conf; 11th of 22 OJHL	Lost Conf. Quarters 2–4 (Hurricanes)
2018–19	54	28	19	2	5	208	174	65	1st of 5 Nor Div; 2nd of 11 NW Conf; 6th of 22 OJHL	Won Conf. Quarters 4–2 (Raiders); Won Conf. Semifinals 4–3 (Hurricanes); Lost Conf. Finals 1–4 (Blades)
2019–20	55	24	25	0	6	194	205	55	4th of 5 Nor Div; 9th of 11 NW Conf; 14th of 22 OJHL	Did Not Qualify for Post Season
2020–21	Season Lost to Covid-19 pandemic									
2021–22	54	8	40	3	3	123	241	22	5th of 5 Nor Div; 10th of 10 NW Conf; 19th of 21 OJHL	Did Not Qualify for Post Season
2022–23	54	24	22	0	7	217	248	55	6th of 10 N/W Conf; 12th of 21 OJHL	Lost Conf. Quarters 0–4 (Cougars)
2023–24	56	30	20	3	3	191	159	66	7th of 12 EAST Conf; 12th of 24 OJHL	Lost Conf. Quarters 0–4 (Buzzers)
2024–25	56	14	36	3	3	164	258	34	10th of 12 EAST Conf; 21st of 24 OJHL	Did Not Qualify for Post Season

== Sutherland Cup appearances ==
1974: Hamilton Red Wings defeated Bramalea Blues by forfeit

== Notable alumni ==
Old Kiltys logo

- Marty McSorley
- Keith Primeau
- Pat Quinn
- Jeff Reese
- Zac Rinaldo
- Gary Roberts
- Steve Staios
- Cam Talbot
- Zach Hyman
- Chris Tanev
- Brandon Tanev
