= 1996 Royal Bank Cup =

Ice hockey championship

Tournament details
- Venue: Melfort, Saskatchewan
- Dates: May 4, 1996 – May 12, 1996
- Teams: 5

Final positions
- Champions: Vernon Vipers (3rd title)
- Runners-up: Melfort Mustangs

Tournament statistics
- Games played: 13
- Scoring leader: Jason Duda (Melfort)

Awards
- MVP: Serge Bourgeois (Moncton)

The Inaugural 1996 Royal Bank Cup is the 26th Junior "A" 1996 ice hockey National Championship for the Canadian Junior A Hockey League.

The Royal Bank Cup was competed for by the winners of the Doyle Cup, Anavet Cup, Dudley Hewitt Cup, the Fred Page Cup and a host city.

The tournament was hosted by the Melfort Mustangs and Melfort, Saskatchewan.

== The Playoffs ==
=== Round Robin ===
Pos	League (Ticket)	Team	Pld	W	L	GF	GA	GD	Qualification
1	SJHL (Host)	Melfort Mustangs	4	4	0	28	5	+23	Semi-final
2	OPJHL (Dudley Hewitt Cup)	Newmarket 87's	4	2	2	18	22	−4	Semi-final
3	BCHL (Doyle Cup)	Vernon Vipers	4	2	2	17	16	+1	Semi-final
4	SJHL (Anavet Cup)	Yorkton Terriers	4	1	3	12	19	−7	Semi-final
5	MJAHL (Fred Page Cup)	Moncton Beavers	4	1	3	9	22	−13	

==== Results ====
Melfort Mustangs defeat Yorkton Terriers 7-1
Newmarket 87's defeat Vernon Vipers 7-5
Melfort Mustangs defeat Moncton Beavers 5-0
Newmarket 87's defeat Yorkton Terriers 5-2
Vernon Vipers defeat Moncton Beavers 6-3
Melfort Mustangs defeat Vernon Vipers 5-1
Yorkton Terriers defeat Moncton Beavers 8-2
Melfort Mustangs defeat Newmarket 87's 11-3
Moncton Beavers defeat Newmarket 87's 4-3
Vernon Vipers defeat Yorkton Terriers 5-1

=== Semi-finals and Final ===
Semi-finals
1	Melfort Mustangs	7
4	Yorkton Terriers	3
2	Newmarket 87's	4
3	Vernon Vipers	7

Royal Bank Cup Finals
1	Melfort Mustangs	0
3	Vernon Vipers	2

== Awards ==
Most Valuable Player: Serge Bourgeois (Moncton Beavers)
Top Scorer: Jason Duda (Melfort Mustangs)
Most Sportsmanlike Player: Valeri Ermolov (Melfort Mustangs)
Top Goalie: Joel Laing (Melfort Mustangs)
Top Forward: Jeff Cheeseman (Vernon Vipers)
Top Defenceman: Curtis Doell (Melfort Mustangs)

== Roll of League Champions ==
AJHL: St. Albert Saints
BCHL: Vernon Vipers
CJHL: Cornwall Colts
MJHL: St. James Canadians
MJAHL: Dartmouth Oland Exports
NOJHL: Rayside-Balfour Sabrecats
OPJHL: Newmarket 87's
QPJHL: Contrecoeur Eperviers
RMJHL: Prince George Spruce Kings
SJHL: Melfort Mustangs

== See also ==
- Canadian Junior A Hockey League
- Royal Bank Cup
- Anavet Cup
- Doyle Cup
- Dudley Hewitt Cup
- Fred Page Cup
- Abbott Cup
- Mowat Cup
