= Oakville Blades =

Ice hockey team from Oakville, Ontario, Canada

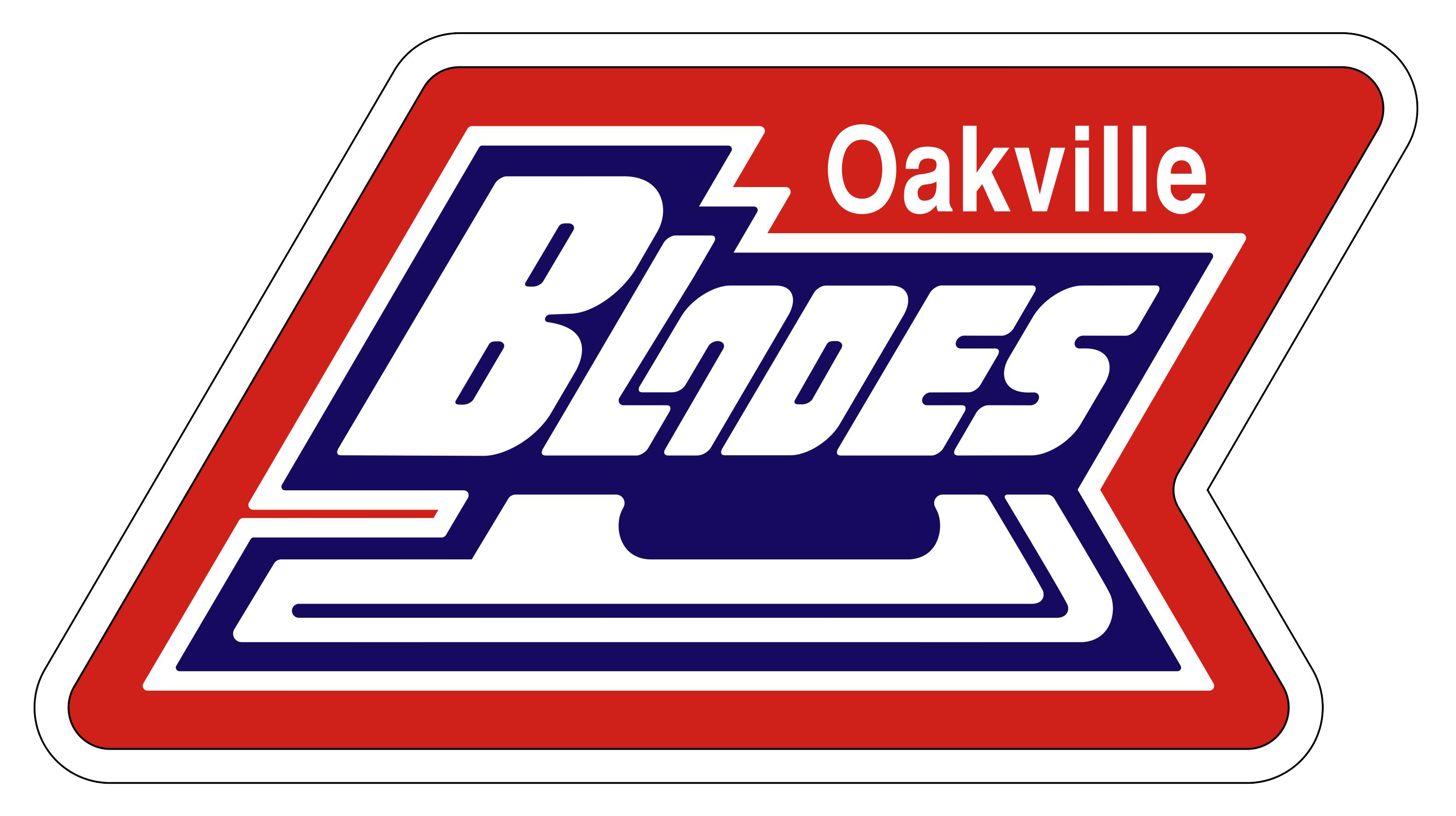
- City: Oakville, Ontario
- League: Ontario Junior Hockey League
- Division: West Division
- Founded: 1966
- Home arena: Sixteen Mile Sports Complex (1,500)
- Colours: Blue, Red, and White
- Owner(s): Jamie Storr & Wayne Purboo
- General manager: Scott McCrory
- Head coach: Scott McCrory
- Media: Instagram, Twitter, TikTok @OakvilleBlades Facebook.com/OakvilleBladesJrA YouTube.com/OakvilleBladesOfficial
- Affiliate: Oakville Rangers (OMHA)

Current uniform

The Oakville Blades are a Junior "A" ice hockey team from Oakville, Ontario, Canada. They are a part of the Ontario Junior Hockey League.

== History ==
The Blades started as a Junior C team, and made it to the Clarence Schmalz Cup Final once to compete for the All-Ontario Junior "C" title. In 1969, the Blades lost 4-games-to-3 to the Woodstock Navy-Vets. Oakville moved up to the Junior B level for the 1970-71 season, and joined the Mid-Ontario Junior B league. In 1971, the leagues realigned, and Oakville moved to the new Central Junior B league. In 1975 and 1991 the Blades made it the Sutherland Cup Final for the All-Ontario Junior "B" title. The first time, they were defeated by the Metro Junior B Hockey League's Bramalea Blues 4-games-to-3. The second time, they were defeated by the Midwestern Junior B Hockey League's Waterloo Siskins 4-games-to-0. Oakville became a Junior A team in the mid 1990s and ever since they played in the Ontario Junior Hockey League Buckland Cup Final five times, winning three Buckland Cups in franchise history.

=== 2007-08 season ===
The Blades had a great 2007-08 regular season. With 39 wins, 6 losses, and 4 overtime losses, the Blades finished first overall in the West Division. After a bye in the division quarter-final, the Blades defeated the Milton Icehawks 4-games-to-1 in the division semi-final and Georgetown Raiders 4-games-to-1 to win the West Division playoff title. In the North/West Conference championship, the Blades took on the defending Royal Bank Cup 2007 champion Aurora Tigers. The Tigers appeared dominant, but faltered late in the series to lose to the Blades 4-games-to-2. In the OPJHL Buckland Cup final, Blades dominated the Markham Waxers and won 4-games-to-1 to win their first ever Junior A league championship.

The Blades then moved on to the Dudley Hewitt Cup, the Central Canadian championship. In game 1, the Blades defeated the Thunder Bay Region champion Dryden Ice Dogs 5-1. The then defeated the Northern Ontario champion Sudbury Jr. Wolves 5-3. In the final game of the round robin, they defeated the host Newmarket Hurricanes 5-2. This gave the Blades a bye to the final where they played the Hurricanes again and beat them 6-3. This earned them a berth into the 2008 Royal Bank Cup.

The 2008 campaign got rocky when the Blades shipped off to Cornwall, Ontario for the Royal Bank Cup. Star goaltender Scott Greenham could not attend the tournament despite leading the Blades to the OPJHL and Central Canadian Championships. Having accepted a scholarship to play for the Alaska Nanooks, he would lose his NCAA eligibility if he played in the Royal Bank Cup because his age (21). With this, the Blades had to bring their back-up cold off the bench for the national championship. In the first game of the tournament, Oakville had to play the host Cornwall Colts of the Central Junior A Hockey League. Despite outshooting them, the Blades were shocked by the Colts 5-4. The next night, the Blades drew the Weeks Crushers of the Maritime Junior A Hockey League. The Blades badly outshot the Crushers, but the Crushers managed to squeak out a 4-3 overtime victory of the Central Canadian champions. In a nail-biting and high scoring outing, the Blades gave Humboldt a 7-6 loss to keep contention for a playoff spot in the tournament. It was not to be though, as the Blades out-shot but still lost to the top ranked Camrose Kodiaks 6-1.

Despite outshooting all four of their opponents, the Oakville Blades lost three out of four games and were eliminated on a head-to-head tie breaker with Weeks.

=== 2018-2019 season ===
The Oakville Blades had their best season yet in franchise history, winning the OJHL, the Dudley-Hewitt Cup, and coming in third place going to the semi-finals at the National Jr. A Hockey Championship, the furthest they have got at the national tournament. The Blades finished with the highest wins ever, and tied for most points in club history.

Team includes: Spencer Kersten, Peyton Reeves "C", Jack Ricketts "A", Thomas Maia, Josh Nixon, Harrison Israels, Kyle Potts, Kyle Lewis, Jason Pineo, Callum Jones "A", Garrett Pyke "A", Alton McDermott, Ryan Nicholson, Nicholas Aromatario, Ryan O'Hara, Holden Doggett, Tyler Amaral, Jack Lyons, Tanner McEachern, Christian Girhiny, Nathan Ribau, Cameron Hatziioannou, Will Barber, Chris Elliot.

Staff: Mike Tarantino (head coach), Rob Bentivegna (assistant coach), Ryan Hunter (assistant coach), Mark Edwards (assistant coach), Jordan Selinger (general manager), Cole Crane (Assistant GM), Craig Clayton (head equipment manager), Natalie Figueria (trainer), Nicholas Fiore (Play by Play Broadcaster), Matthew Ahmadzai (Colour Commentator), John Cole (Camera Man)

== Season-by-season results ==
Season	GP	W	L	T	OTL	GF	GA	P	Results	Playoffs
1970-71	33	10	20	3	-	137	178	23	8th MOJBHL	
1971-72	42	23	15	4	-	240	202	50	3rd CJBHL	
1972-73	42	25	13	4	-	242	186	54	3rd CJBHL	
1973-74	42	34	7	1	-	302	130	69	1st CJBHL	
1974-75	40	29	8	3	-	292	149	61	1st CJBHL	Won League
1975-76	36	19	12	5	-	189	160	43	2nd CJBHL	
1976-77	42	27	11	4	-	219	187	58	1st CJBHL	
1977-78	42	20	17	5	-	237	216	45	5th CJBHL	
1978-79	44	30	14	0	-	288	204	60	3rd CJBHL	
1979-80	44	16	25	3	-	237	257	35	9th CJBHL	
1980-81	44	29	10	5	-	256	162	63	2nd CJBHL	
1981-82	40	37	2	1	-	276	124	75	1st CJBHL	Won League
1982-83	42	26	13	3	-	212	144	55	2nd CJBHL	
1983-84	40	29	5	6	-	268	120	64	2nd CJBHL	
1984-85	40	21	12	7	-	230	156	49	4th CJBHL	
1985-86	48	28	12	8	-	276	188	64	2nd CJBHL	
1986-87	42	24	12	6	-	226	185	54	2nd CJBHL	
1987-88	44	24	16	4	-	228	201	52	6th CJBHL	
1988-89	42	15	20	7	-	161	192	37	10th CJBHL	
1989-90	42	29	4	9	-	233	124	67	2nd CJBHL	
1990-91	42	25	8	9	-	252	152	59	2nd CJBHL	Won League
1991-92	42	24	10	8	-	251	148	56	3rd CJBHL	
1992-93	49	24	23	2	-	219	193	51	9th CJBHL	
1993-94	42	25	15	2	-	249	195	53	4th OPJHL-W	
1994-95	49	24	20	5	-	249	221	54	6th OPJHL-W	
1995-96	50	21	24	5	-	211	228	50	3rd OPJHL-Mi	
1996-97	51	22	28	1	-	218	233	50	3rd OPJHL-Mi	
1997-98	51	31	15	4	1	215	183	67	2nd OPJHL-Mi	
1998-99	51	22	23	4	2	216	216	50	7th OPJHL-W	
1999-00	49	16	21	9	3	209	246	44	8th OPJHL-W	
2000-01	49	14	27	6	2	185	228	36	9th OPJHL-W	
2001-02	49	33	11	3	2	254	177	71	3rd OPJHL-W	
2002-03	49	27	20	2	0	219	197	56	5th OPJHL-W	
2003-04	49	32	13	3	1	207	143	68	3rd OPJHL-W	
2004-05	49	40	6	1	2	283	110	83	2nd OPJHL-W	
2005-06	49	26	17	3	3	231	147	58	4th OPJHL-W	Lost League SF
2006-07	49	38	9	1	1	269	125	78	2nd OPJHL-W	Lost Conf. SF
2007-08	49	39	6	-	4	222	139	82	1st OPJHL-W	Won League, 4-1 Series VS Markham
2008-09	49	41	8	-	0	289	146	82	2nd OJHL-M	Lost in FINAL 4-2 VS Kingston
2009-10	56	46	9	-	1	280	137	93	2nd OJAHL	Won League, OHA Champions, 4-3 VS Kingston
2010-11	50	36	12	-	2	212	131	74	2nd OJHL-W	Lost final, 4-1 VS Wellington
2011-12	49	31	12	-	6	196	120	68	2nd OJHL-W	Lost division final
2012-13	55	34	16	-	5	214	159	73	4th OJHL-S	Lost Conf. Quarters 1-4 vs North York
2013-14	53	23	26	-	4	165	212	80	6th OJHL-S	Lost Tie-breaker
2014-15	53	31	19	2	2	201	130	66	2nd of 6 South Div; 3rd of 11 SW Conf; 7th of 22 OJHL	Won Conf. Quarters 4-3 (Flyers); Lost Conf. Semifinals 1-4 (Patriots)
2015-16	54	34	17	2	1	231	178	71	1st of 6 South Div; 3rd of 11 SW Conf; 5th of 22 OJHL	Won Conf. Quarters 4-2 (Buzzers); Lost Conf. Semifinals 3-4 (Cougars)
2016-17	54	33	14	0	7	217	146	73	1st of 6 South Div; 3rd of 11 SW Conf; 6th of 22 OJHL	Won Conf. Quarters 4-1 (Rangers); Won Conf. Semifinals 4-1 (Cougars); Lost Conf. Finals 2-4 (Raiders)
2017-18	54	38	13	2	1	195	125	79	3rd of 6 South Div; 3rd of 11 SW Conf; 3rd of 22 OJHL	Won Conf. Quarters 4-2 (Jr. Canadiens); Lost Conf. Semifinals 3-4 (Patriots)
2018-19	55	44	5	2	4	247	124	94	1st of 6 West Div; 1st of 11 NW Conf; 1st of 22 OJHL	Won NW Conf. Quarters 4-1 (Admirals); Won NW Conf. Semifinals 4-1 (Jr. Sabres); Won NW Conf. Finals 4-1 (Royals); Won OJHL Buckland Cup 4-0 (Dukes)
2019-20	54	39	9	2	4	230	129	84	1st of 6 West Div; 1st of 11 NW Conf; Tied 2nd of 22 OJHL	Won NW Conf. Quarters 4-0 (99ers); SEASON CANCELLED (COVID-19)
2020-21	SEASON CANCELLED (COVID-19)									
2021-22	54	24	27	1	2	167	195	51	4th of 5 West Div; 7th of 10 NW Conf; 14th of 21 OJHL	Lost NW Conf. Quarters 2-0 (Cougars)
2022-23	54	16	36	1	1	144	233	34	9th of 10 NW Conf; 17th of 21 OJHL	Did Not Qualify for Post Season
2023-24	56	32	20	1	3	180	151	68	4th of 12 West Conf; 8th of 24 OJHL	Won W Conf. Quarters 4-2 (Jr. Sabres); Lost W Conf. Semifinals 1-4 (Blues)
2024-25	56	16	32	3	5	133	210	40	10th of 12 West Conf; 19th of 24 OJHL	Did Not Qualify for Post Season

== National Jr. A Championship appearances ==
- 2008: 5th Place - 1-3-0 Record

Host city: Cornwall, Ontario
Defeated by Cornwall Colts (CCHL) 5-4
Defeated by Pictou County Crushers (MJAHL) 4-3
Defeated by Camrose Kodiaks (AJHL) 6-1
Won vs. Humboldt Broncos (SJHL) 7-6

- 2010: 5th Place - 0-3-1 Record

Host city: Dauphin, Manitoba
Defeated by La Ronge Ice Wolves (SJHL) 3-2 OT
Defeated by Brockville Braves (CCHL) 11-2
Defeated by Vernon Vipers (BCHL) 5-3
Defeated by Dauphin Kings (MJHL) 5-4

- 2019: Lost in Semifinal - 2-3-0 Record

Host city: Brooks, Alberta
Defeated by Brooks Bandits (AJHL) 7-3
Defeated by Prince George Spruce Kings (BCHL) 5-1
Won vs. Portage Terriers (MJHL) 5-4
Won vs. Ottawa Jr. Senators (CCHL) 7-4
Defeated by Prince George Spruce Kings (BCHL) 2-1 in semifinal

== Centennial Cup - Revised format 2022 ==
Canadian Jr. A National Championships
Maritime Junior Hockey League, Quebec Junior Hockey League, Central Canada Hockey League, Ontario Junior Hockey League, Northern Ontario Junior Hockey League, Superior International Junior Hockey League, Manitoba Junior Hockey League, Saskatchewan Junior Hockey League, Alberta Junior Hockey League, and Host. The BCHL declared itself an independent league and there is no BC representative.
Round-robin play in two 5-team pools with top three in pool advancing to determine a Champion.

Year	Round-robin	Record	Standing	Quarterfinal	Semifinal	Championship
2024; HOST	L, Miramichi Timberwolves (MarJHL), 4-7; W, Sioux Lookout Bombers (SIJHL), 5-2; L, Winkler Flyers (ManJHL), 0-4; L, Melfort Mustangs (SJHL), 1-3	1-0-3-0	4th of 5 Group B	did not qualified	did not qualified	did not qualified

== Dudley Hewitt Cup appearances ==
The Dudley Hewitt Cup represents the Central Canadian Junior A championship. The winner moves on to the Centennial Cup National Junior A championship.

- 2008: Won Championship - 4-0-0 Record

Host city: Newmarket, Ontario
Won vs. Dryden Ice Dogs (SIJHL) 5-1
Won vs. Sudbury Jr. Wolves (NOJHL) 5-3
Won vs. Newmarket Hurricanes (OPJHL) 5-2
Won vs. Newmarket Hurricanes (OPJHL) 6-3 in final

- 2010: Won Championship - 4-0-0 Record

Host city: Sault Ste. Marie, Ontario
Won vs. Fort William North Stars (SIJHL) 2-1 OT
Won vs. Abitibi Eskimos (NOJHL) 6-0
Won vs. Soo Thunderbirds (NOJHL) 3-1
Won vs. Fort William North Stars (SIJHL) 2-1 in final

- 2019: Won Championship - 4-0-0 Record

Host city: Cochrane, Ontario
Won vs. Thunder Bay North Stars (SIJHL) 9-4
Won vs. Hearst Lumberjacks (NOJHL) 4-2
Won vs. Cochrane Crunch (NOJHL) 6-2
Won vs. Hearst Lumberjacks (NOJHL) 2-0 in final

== Sutherland Cup appearances ==
1975: Bramalea Blues defeated Oakville Blades 4-games-to-3
1991: Waterloo Siskins defeated Oakville Blades 4-games-to-none

== Clarence Schmalz Cup appearances ==
1969: Woodstock Navy-Vets defeated Oakville Blades 4-games-to-3
