= 2025 Centennial Cup =

Ice hockey national championship

2025 National championship
Centennial Cup
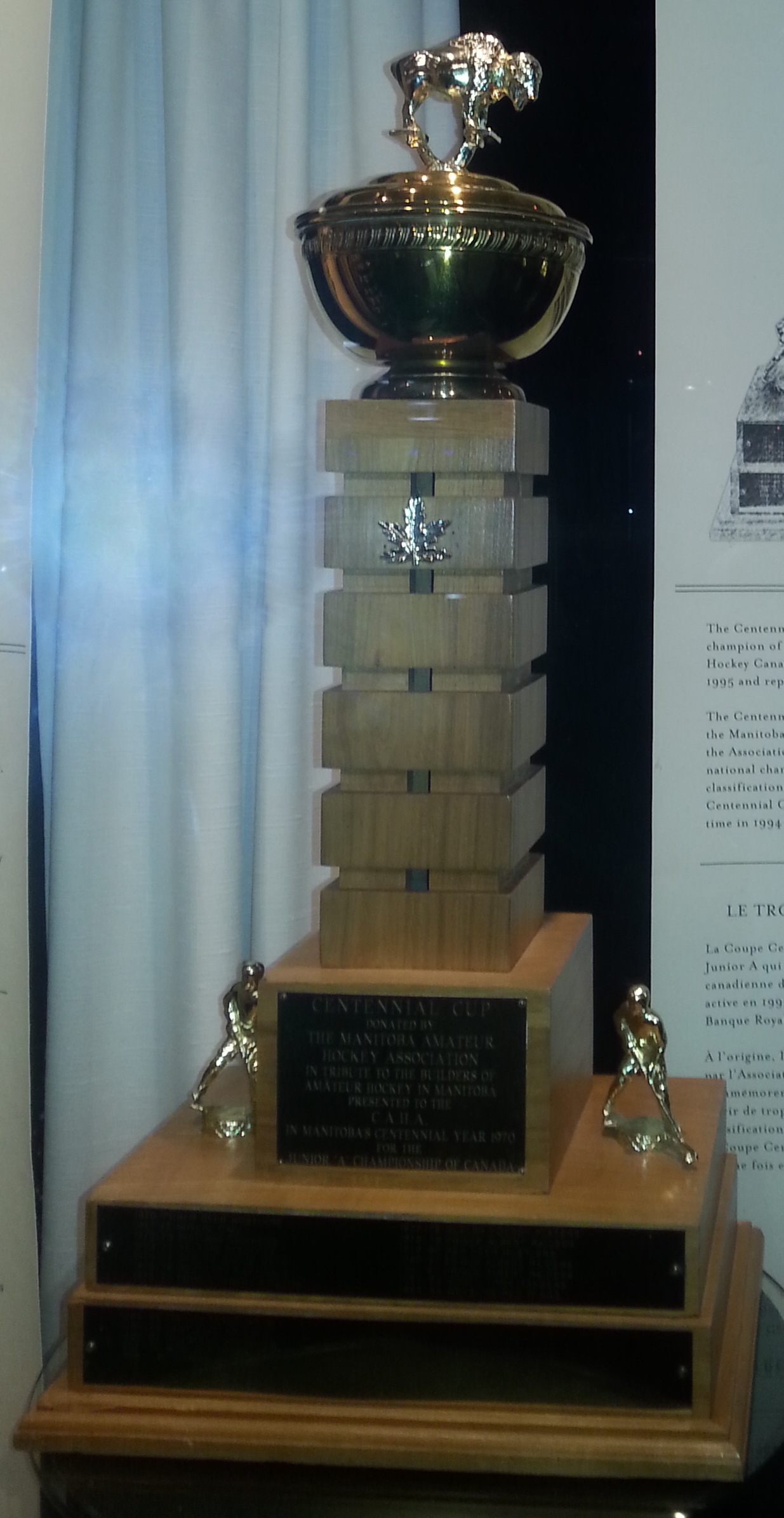

Tournament details
- Cities: Calgary, Alberta
- Venue: Max Bell Centre
- Dates: 8–18 May 2025
- Teams: 10
- Host team: Calgary Canucks

Final positions
- Champions: Calgary Canucks
- Runners-up: Melfort Mustangs
- Semifinalists: Rockland Nationals; Trenton Golden Hawks

Tournament statistics
- Games played: 25
- Goals scored: 189 (7.56 per game)

Awards
- MVP: Anthony Hall

Official website
- Hockey Canada

The 2025 Centennial Cup was the 54th annual Junior A national championship tournament of Hockey Canada. The Calgary Canucks of the Alberta Junior Hockey League (AJHL) were the winners, after having placed 3rd the year before. The Canucks were also the host team. The tournament took place at the Max Bell Centre in Calgary. The 10-team format included the championship teams from the 9 leagues that collectively make up the CJHL. The 2,121-seat Max Bell Centre opened in 1974 and underwent a major renovation in 2021. On May 10, 2025, Cianna Lieffers became the first female to referee a game in Centennial Cup history.

== Calgary Canucks ==
The Calgary Canucks, as the hosts, did not need to win their league championship to qualify for admission to the tournament. Nonetheless, the Canucks did win the Alberta Junior Hockey League (AJHL) championship Inter Pipeline Cup. After finishing the regular season in first place, the Canucks moved through three best-of-seven playoff series with 12 wins and one loss. The last time the Canucks won a national championship was in 1995. They placed 3rd at the 2024 Centennial Cup.

Regular season: 37-13-4 (1st in AJHL)
Playoffs: Defeated Camrose Kodiaks 4-1; defeated Drumheller Dragons 4-0; defeated Grande Prairie Storm 4-0.

== Grande Prairie Storm ==
The Grande Prairie Storm were the runners-up of the AJHL. Despite finishing the regular season in 6th place overall, the Storm swept through the quarter and semifinal rounds of the playoffs before being swept by the Calgary Canucks in the final round. Since the Canucks already had a guaranteed berth in the national championship as the host team, the Storm also advanced.

Regular season: 30-17-7 (6th in AJHL)
Playoffs: Defeated Lloydminster Bobcats 4-0; defeated Whitecourt Wolverines 4-0; Lost to Calgary Canucks 4-0.

== Melfort Mustangs ==
The Melfort Mustangs of the Saskatchewan Junior Hockey League (SJHL) qualified after defeating the Weyburn Red Wings for the SJHL championship Canterra Seeds Cup. The Mustangs were the runners-up at the 2024 Centennial Cup after losing to the Collingwood Blues of the Ontario Junior Hockey League (OJHL) by a score of 1–0 in the final match. The Mustangs finished 2nd at the 2024 Centennial Cup after losing 1–0 to the Collingwood Blues of the OJHL in the final match.

Regular season: 46-8-2 (1st in SJHL)
Playoffs: Defeated Kindersley Klippers 4-1; defeated Yorkton Terriers 4-0; defeated Weyburn Red Wings 4-1.

== Northern Manitoba Blizzard ==
The Northern Manitoba Blizzard finished the regular season in sixth place of the Manitoba Junior Hockey League (MJHL) overall, and second in their division. The Blizzard swept the first-place Winkler Flyers in four games in the semifinal round. The Blizzard then faced the Dauphin Kings, in the final round that went to triple-overtime in game 7, to win the MJHL championship Turnbull Cup and secure their entry to the nationals.

Regular season: 35-22-1 (6th in MJHL)
Playoffs: Defeated Neepawa Titans 4-1; defeated Winkler Flyers 4-0; defeated Dauphin Kings 4–3

== Greater Sudbury Cubs ==
The Greater Sudbury Cubs finished the regular season in first place overall of the Northern Ontario Junior Hockey League (NOJHL) and went on to win the league championship Copeland Cup – McNamara Trophy after defeating the Hearst Lumberjacks in game 7 of the final round of the playoffs. The Cubs also competed for the 2024 Centennial Cup in Oakville, Ontario but did not make it past the round-robin stage of the tournament.

Regular season: 44-6-2 (1st in NOJHL)
Playoffs: Defeated Iroquois Falls Storm 4-0; defeated Soo Thunderbirds 4-0; defeated Hearst Lumberjacks 4-3.

== Trenton Golden Hawks ==
The Trenton Golden Hawks of the Ontario Junior Hockey League (OJHL) defeated the Milton Menace, 6-2, to win the OJHL championship Buckland Cup. It was the third year in a row that the Golden Hawks made the league finals.

Regular season: 47-6-3 (1st in OJHL)
Playoffs: Defeated Pickering Panthers 4-1; defeated Stouffville Spirit 4-1; defeated Haliburton County Huskies 4-1; defeated Milton Menace 4-2.

== Rockland Nationals ==
The Rockland Nationals of the Central Canada Hockey League (CCHL) finished the regular season in first place and went on to win the league championship Bogart Cup to secure their place in the national tournament. During the regular season, the Nationals went on the longest winning streak of any team in the CJHL, with 21 straight victories, and were ranked first in the nation for 10 weeks.

Regular season: 45-8-2 (1st in CCHL)
Playoffs: Defeated Cornwall Colts 4-0; defeated Smiths Falls Bears 4-3; defeated Carleton Place Canadians 4-0.

== Kam River Fighting Walleye ==
The Kam River Fighting Walleye of the Superior International Junior Hockey League (SIJHL) finished the regular season in second place, then defeated the first-place Dryden Ice Dogs in the final round of the playoffs to win the league championship Bill Salonen Cup.

Regular season: 39-13-1 (2nd in SIJHL)
Playoffs: Defeated Ironwood Lumberjacks 4-0; defeated Thunder Bay North Stars 4-0; defeated Dryden Ice Dogs 4-2.

== Edmundston Blizzard ==
The Edmundston Blizzard of the Maritime Junior Hockey League (MHL) reached to the top of the CJHL Top 20 list in November, becoming the first MHL team to do so since 2011–12. The Blizzard went on to win the league championship Metalfab Cup after sweeping the Pictou County Crushers in the final round of the playoffs.

Regular season: 44-6-2 (1st in MHL)
Playoffs: Defeated Miramichi Timberwolves 4-1; defeated Campbellton Tigers 4-0; defeated Pictou County Crushers 4-0.

== Valleyfield Braves ==
The Valleyfield Braves defeated the Quebec Junior Hockey League (QJHL) defending-championship Collège Français de Longueuil in six games to win the NAPA Cup.

Regular season: 37-9-2 (1st in QJHL)
Playoffs: Defeated Panthères de Saint-Jerome 4-0; defeated Indigo de Granby 4-3; defeated Collège Français de Longueuil 4-2.

== Round robin ==
Teams were randomly assigned to Group A or Group B. During the preliminary round robin phase, each team played each other team in their group once. Three points were awarded for a win in regulation time, two points for a win in overtime or shootout, one point for a loss in overtime or shootout, and no points were awarded for a loss in regulation time. Only the top 3 teams in each group advanced to the next round. Under this formula, the Greater Sudbury Cubs and the Grande Prairie Storm tied for 3rd place in Group A with 6 points each. The 3rd place berth was awarded to the Cubs due to their 6-2 victory in the round robin over the Storm.

	Group A	TGH	NMB	GSC	GPS	KRF
1	Trenton Golden Hawks		5-4	5-2	6-2	1-2
2	Northern Manitoba Blizzard	4-5		6-3	6-3	3-2
3	Greater Sudbury Cubs	2-5	3-6		6-2	2-1
4	Grande Prairie Storm	2-6	3-6	2-6		3-1
5	Kam River Fighting Walleye	2-1	2-3	1-2	1-3	

	Group B	CC	MM	RN	EB	VB
1	Calgary Canucks		3-1	2-7	8-2	11-6
2	Melfort Mustangs	1-3		5-2	5-3	5-4
3	Rockland Nationals	7-2	2-5		3-4	9-4
4	Edmunston Blizzard	2-8	3-5	4-3		7-2
5	Valleyfield Braves	6-11	4-5	4-9	2-7	

== Playoffs ==
Based on the results of the preliminary round robin, the quarterfinals included the Northern Manitoba Blizzard against the Rockland Nationals; and the Melfort Mustangs against the Greater Sudbury Cubs. The Nationals defeated the Blizzard, 4-0, and the Mustangs defeated the Cubs, 7-1.

The Trenton Golden Hawks and the Calgary Canucks, who placed first in their respective groups, had a bye in the quarterfinal round and advanced to the semifinals. The Canucks faced the Nationals, and the Golden Hawks faced the Mustangs. The Canucks had previously lost to the Nationals by a score of 7–2 in the preliminary round. By the 2nd period of the semifinal, the Nationals were winning, 2-0, and by the end of 3rd period, the score was tied, 2-2. The Canucks scored the game-winning goal in overtime to advance to the final.

The final was between the Canucks and the Mustangs. Notably, it was the Mustangs who eliminated the Canucks at the 2024 Centennial Cup in the semifinal, before losing in the final. This time, however, the Canucks defeated the Mustangs, 7-2, to win the championship Centennial Cup.

Quarterfinals
Northern Manitoba Blizzard	0
Rockland Nationals	4
Melfort Mustangs	7
Greater Sudbury Cubs	1

Semifinals
Rockland Nationals	2
Calgary Canucks	3
Trenton Golden Hawks	3
Melfort Mustangs	4

Finals
Calgary Canucks	7
Melfort Mustangs	2

Source: "2025 Centennial Cup schedule & results". hockeycanada.ca. Hockey Canada.

== Individual awards ==
The following individual awards were announced before the championship game.

- Most valuable player: Anthony Hall, Rockland Nationals
- Top forward: Anthony Hall, Rockland Nationals
- Top defencemen: Nathan Maloney, Calgary Canucks
- Top goaltender: Ashton Sadauskas, Kam River Fighting Walleye
- Most sportsmanlike player: Lincoln Moore, Greater Sudbury Cubs

== Map of competitors ==
Canadian Junior Hockey League

== Sources ==
- "Hosts announced for 2024 and 2025 Centennial Cups". hockeycanada.ca (Press release). Calgary, AB: Hockey Canada. 4 May 2023.
- "Calgary to host 2025 Centennial Cup". Global News. Corus Entertainment. 12 August 2024.
- "Junior A hockey's best to battle in Calgary". alberta.ca. Government of Alberta. 27 September 2024.
- Campbell, Glenn (12 August 2024). "Calgary Canucks win bid to host 2025 Centennial Cup; event will be city's first". CTV News Calgary. Bell Media.
- "Calgary Canucks win 2025 Centennial Cup bid". CTV News Calgary. Bell Media. 12 August 2024.
- Hartviksen, Galen (12 August 2024). "AJHL's Calgary Canucks Win Bid To Host 2025 Centennial Cup Tournament". My Mountain View Now.
- O'Nyons, Harrison (4 May 2023). "Okotoks Oilers to host the 2025 Centennial Cup". High River Online.
- Duff, Darnell (30 January 2025). "MJHL Opens National Tournament On May 8". 730ckdm.com.
- Hanoomansingh, Dan. "Officials selected for the 2025 Centennial Cup". hockeycanada.ca. Hockey Canada.
- Saelhof, Todd (9 May 2025). "Home-ice edge, vengeance driving Calgary Canucks at CJHL's Centennial Cup". Calgary Herald. Postmedia.
- "Golden Hawks clip Blizzard in overtime in Centennial Cup opener". intelligencer.ca. Postmedia. 9 May 2025.
- Dunick, Leith (8 May 2025). "Fighting Walleye angling for Centennial Cup playoff run". TBNewsWatch.com. Dougall Media.
- Saelhof, Todd (8 May 2025). "Centennial Cup guide: 'High-end offensive guys' on Greater Sudbury Cubs". Sudbury Star. Postmedia.
- Saelhof, Todd (7 May 2025). "Guide to the 2025 Centennial Cup in Calgary: The skinny on the 10 contenders". Calgary Herald. Postmedia.
- Bertrand, Dan (11 May 2025). "Third-period collapse costs Greater Sudbury Cubs in 6-3 loss in their Game 2 at Centennial Cup". CTVNews. Bell Media.
- "NOJHL Cubs Fall to 1 – 1 at the 2025 Centennial Cup in Calgary with a Loss to the MJHL Blizzard". saultsports.com. TruHous Media. 11 May 2025.
- "Cubs clipped by Blizzard in Centennial Cup play Saturday". Sudbury.com. Village Media. 11 May 2025.
- Jhalli, Anil (11 May 2025). "Bogart Cup: Rockland Nationals crowned CCHL champions". Les éditions André Paquette (in Canadian French).
- Dunick, Leith (12 May 2025). "Kam River picks up first loss at Centennial Cup". TBNewsWatch.com. Dougall Media.
- Leeson, Ben (12 May 2025). "Greater Sudbury Cubs split opening weekend at Centennial Cup". Sudbury Star. Postmedia.
- Bertrand, Dan (14 May 2025). "Cubs edge Walleye in must-win game, clinch Centennial Cup quarter-final berth". CTVNews. Bell Media.
- Saelhof, Todd (14 May 2025). "Bowden Singleton helps push Calgary Canucks into Centennial Cup playoffs with chip on shoulder". Calgary Herald. Postmedia.
- Hunt, Stephen (14 May 2025). "Canucks advance at Centennial Cup, defeating Blizzard 8-2". CTVNews. Bell Media.
- Cianna Lieffers breaks another barrier at the Centennial Cup. Hockey Canada. 16 May 2025.
- Goldsworthy, Nicole (23 May 2025). "Cianna Lieffers makes history as first female Centennial Cup referee". SaskToday.ca. Harvard Media.
- Dankochik, Cassidy (22 May 2025). "Host Calgary Canucks win Centennial Cup in blowout". The Carillon.
