= 2024–25 OJHL season =

- League: Ontario Junior Hockey League
- Sport: Hockey
- Teams: 24
- Finals champions: Trenton Golden Hawks

OJHL seasons
- 2023–24 OJHL 2025–26 OJHL

The 2024-25 season was the 30th season for the Ontario Junior Hockey League.

== League changes ==
- The Brantford 99ers relocated to King City and were renamed the King Rebellion.

== Regular season ==
Note: GP = Games played; W = Wins; L = Losses; OTL = Overtime losses; SL = Shootout losses; GF = Goals for; GA = Goals against; PTS = Points; x = clinched playoff berth; y = clinched conference title; z = clinched regular season title

=== East Conference ===
Rank	Team	GP	W	L	T	OTL	PTS
1	xyz-Trenton Golden Hawks	56	47	6	2	1	97
2	x-Toronto Jr. Canadiens	56	42	11	0	3	87
3	x-Haliburton County Huskies	56	40	15	0	1	81
4	x-Stouffville Spirit	56	33	19	0	4	70
5	x-Wellington Dukes	56	33	19	0	4	70
6	x-St. Michael's Buzzers	56	30	20	2	4	66
7	x-Cobourg Cougars	56	26	22	2	6	60
8	x-Pickering Panthers	56	25	26	1	4	55
9	Lindsay Muskies	56	21	31	1	3	46
10	Markham Royals	56	14	36	3	3	34
11	Aurora Tigers	56	11	40	1	4	27
12	North York Rangers	56	5	50	1	0	11

=== West Conference ===
Rank	Team	GP	W	L	T	OTL	PTS
1	xy-Leamington Flyers	56	45	7	3	1	94
2	x-Collingwood Blues	56	43	9	3	1	90
3	x-Milton Menace	56	36	15	1	4	77
4	x-Buffalo Jr. Sabres	56	34	19	2	1	71
5	x-Toronto Patriots	56	31	19	2	4	68
6	x-Burlington Cougars	56	31	20	3	2	67
7	x-King Rebellion	56	24	25	2	5	55
8	x-Niagara Falls Canucks	56	23	27	0	6	52
9	Georgetown Raiders	56	19	31	2	4	44
10	Oakville Blades	56	16	32	3	5	40
11	Mississauga Chargers	56	14	35	0	7	35
12	Caledon Admirals	56	11	43	2	0	24

=== Scoring leaders ===
Note: GP = Games played; G = Goals; A = Assists; Pts = Points; PIM = Penalty minutes

Player	Team	GP	G	A	Pts	PIM
Colton Smith	Leamington Flyers	54	46	49	95	24
David Fournier	Trenton Golden Hawks	55	42	50	92	26
Taeo Artichuk	Trenton Golden Hawks	55	33	56	89	56
Parker Forlin	Niagara Falls Canucks	49	40	41	81	52
Nathan Poole	Haliburton County Huskies	49	24	57	81	16
David Elmy	St. Michael's Buzzers	56	40	34	74	14
Cory Jewitt	Wellington Dukes	56	27	46	73	29
Luke Johnston	Milton Menace	49	33	39	72	36
Riley Pope	Stouffville Spirit	54	32	40	72	42
Mathieu Macmillan	Burlington Cougars	54	31	40	71	23

=== Leading goaltenders ===
Note: GP = Games played; Mins = Minutes played; W = Wins; L = Losses: OTL = Overtime losses;
T = Ties; GA = Goals Allowed; SO = Shutouts; GAA = Goals against average

Player	Team	GP	MINS	W	L	OTL	T	GA	SO	Sv%	GAA
Marcus Vandenberg	Leamington Flyers	37	2269	31	4	1	1	56	6	0.946	1.48
Noah Tegelaar	Collingwood Blues	30	1817	22	4	1	3	51	10	0.940	1.68
Ryan Sanborn	Trenton Golden Hawks	22	1298	20	1	1	0	38	6	0.938	1.76
Colten Drillen-Roach	Collingwood Blues	23	1367	18	4	0	0	51	2	0.916	2.24
Anthony Alessi	Buffalo Jr. Sabres	31	1814	18	10	0	2	71	2	0.923	2.35

== Playoffs ==
Conference Quarterfinals (Best of 7)	Conference Semi-Finals (Best of 7)
E1	Trenton	4
E8	Pickering	1
E1	Trenton	4
E4	Stouffville	1
E2	Toronto	4
E7	Cobourg	1
East Conference
E3	Haliburton	'4
E6	St. Michaels	2
E2	Toronto Jr Canadians	2
E3	Halliburton	4
E4	Stouffvile	4
E5	Wellington	0
W1	Leamington	4
W8	Niagara	0
W1	Leamington	4
W4	Buffalo	0
W2	Collingwood	4
W7	King	1
West Conference
W3	Milton	4
W6	Burlington	0
W2	Collingwood	1
W3	Milton	4
W4	Buffalo	4
W5	Toronto	2

Conference Finals (Best of 7)
E1	Trenton	4
E3	Haliburton	1
W1	Leamington	1'
W3	Milton	4

OJHL Final (Best of 7)
E1	Trenton	4
W1	Milton	2
