= Lucas Condotta =

Canadian ice hockey player (born 1997)

- Born: November 6, 1997 (age 28) Georgetown, Ontario, Canada
- Height: 6 ft 1 in (185 cm)
- Weight: 218 lb (99 kg; 15 st 8 lb)
- Position: Left wing
- Shoots: Left
- NHL team (P) Cur. team: Montreal Canadiens; Laval Rocket (AHL)
- NHL draft: Undrafted
- Playing career: 2022–present

Lucas Condotta (born November 6, 1997) is a Canadian professional ice hockey player who is a winger and captain for the Laval Rocket of the American Hockey League (AHL) while under contract to the Montreal Canadiens of the National Hockey League (NHL). Originally undrafted by teams in the NHL, he signed as an unrestricted free agent with Montreal in March 2022.

== Playing career ==
=== Junior ===
Condotta played in the Ontario Junior Hockey League (OJHL) from 2013 to 2018. He began his Junior A career with the Pickering Panthers before being traded to the Hamilton Red Wings. His final three OJHL seasons were spent with the Markham Royals during which time he was named to the league's First All-Star Team.

=== Collegiate ===
Condotta joined UMass Lowell of the National Collegiate Athletic Association (NCAA) in 2018. He played a total of 121 collegiate games for the River Hawks, registering 52 points. He was named captain of the River Hawks in his senior year, scoring 10 goals and 23 points. Collectively, Condotta was named the team's most valuable player twice and made the Hockey East conference All-Academic Team on four separate occasions.

=== Professional ===
Originally going undrafted by National Hockey League (NHL) teams, Condotta signed a one-year contract with the Montreal Canadiens at the conclusion of his collegiate career with UMass Lowell on March 31, 2022. He then joined Montreal's American Hockey League (AHL) affiliate, the Laval Rocket, under a professional tryout (PTO) to finish the 2021–22 AHL season.

In his first full season with Laval, Condotta played in 72 games, scoring 16 goals and 31 points. On April 13, 2023, he made his NHL debut versus the Boston Bruins, replacing an injured Mike Hoffman. In the same game, Condotta scored his first NHL goal against goaltender Jeremy Swayman in a 5–4 loss. On July 13, 2023, Condotta signed a two-year, two-way contract extension to remain with Montreal.

Beginning the 2023–24 season with the Rocket, Condotta was recalled by Montreal on January 24, 2024, and made his season debut in a 4–3 victory over the New York Islanders the following day. Collectively, he played in three games with the Canadiens over two stints in January and February, going scoreless over that span.

After clearing waivers to begin the 2024–25 season, Condotta was assigned to the Rocket and subsequently named as the fifth captain in franchise history on October 11, 2024. He was recalled by the Canadiens on both October 26 and November 6 respectively and made his season debut with the team in a 5–3 loss versus the New Jersey Devils on November 7. Tallying one goal through seven games played with Montreal, Condotta was reassigned to Laval on November 25.

On March 19, 2025, he agreed to a two-year contract extension with the Canadiens organization.

== Personal life ==
Condotta is related to Matt Martin of the New York Islanders and is the son-in-law of former NHL player Darcy Tucker, having married the foregoing's daughter Owynn in 2024. The couple has one child, a daughter named Codie.

== Career statistics ==
			Regular season					Playoffs
Season	Team	League	GP	G	A	Pts	PIM	GP	G	A	Pts	PIM
2013-14	Pickering Panthers	OJHL	44	0	1	1	6	—	—	—	—	—
2014-15	Pickering Panthers	OJHL	28	4	12	6	36	—	—	—	—	—
2014–15	Hamilton Red Wings	OJHL	7	1	6	7	35	—	—	—	—	—
2015-16	Markham Royals	OJHL	52	10	22	32	32	9	0	8	8	6
2016-17	Markham Royals	OJHL	54	26	39	65	58	6	0	4	4	2
2017-18	Markham Royals	OJHL	54	35	47	82	60	6	0	3	3	30
2018–19	UMass Lowell	HE	34	4	5	9	35	—	—	—	—	—
2019–20	UMass Lowell	HE	34	4	6	10	14	—	—	—	—	—
2020–21	UMass Lowell	HE	20	6	4	10	14	—	—	—	—	—
2021–22	UMass Lowell	HE	33	10	13	23	25	—	—	—	—	—
2021–22	Laval Rocket	AHL	7	0	1	1	2	10	2	2	4	4
2022–23	Laval Rocket	AHL	72	16	15	31	61	2	0	0	0	0
2022–23	Montreal Canadiens	NHL	1	1	0	1	0	—	—	—	—	—
2023–24	Laval Rocket	AHL	65	8	11	19	43	—	—	—	—	—
2023–24	Montreal Canadiens	NHL	3	0	0	0	0	—	—	—	—	—
2024–25	Laval Rocket	AHL	63	5	26	31	77	13	3	1	4	34
2024–25	Montreal Canadiens	NHL	7	1	0	1	0	—	—	—	—	—
2025–26	Laval Rocket	AHL	70	8	10	18	94	5	0	1	1	8
NHL totals			11	2	0	2	0	—	—	—	—	—

== Awards and honours ==
Award	Year	Ref
OJHL
First All-Star Team	2018	
College
Hockey East All-Academic Team	2019, 2020, 2021, 2022	
