= 2021–22 OJHL season =

- League: Ontario Junior Hockey League
- Sport: Hockey
- Teams: 21
- Finals champions: Pickering Panthers

OJHL seasons
- ← 2019–20 OJHL 2022–23 OJHL →

The 2021–22 season was the 27th season for the Ontario Junior Hockey League.

== Team changes ==
- The Buffalo Jr. Sabres did not participate due to COVID-19 pandemic
- The Collingwood Colts were renamed the Collingwood Blues
- The Whitby Fury moved to Minden, Ontario and were renamed the Haliburton County Huskies
- The Brampton Admirals moved to Caledon, Ontario and were renamed the Caledon Admirals

== Standings ==
Note: GP = Games played; W = Wins; L = Losses; OTL = Overtime losses; SL = Shootout losses; GF = Goals for; GA = Goals against; PTS = Points; x = clinched playoff berth; y = clinched division title; z = clinched conference title

=== North West Conference ===
North division	GP	W	L	T	OTL	PTS
z-Pickering Panthers	54	39	11	0	4	82
x-Collingwood Blues	54	29	20	1	4	63
x-Aurora Tigers	54	25	23	2	4	56
x-Stouffville Spirit	54	14	35	3	2	33
Markham Royals	54	8	40	2	4	22

West division	GP	W	L	T	OTL	PTS
y-Burlington Cougars	54	39	12	2	1	81
x-Milton Menace	54	36	11	1	6	79
x-Georgetown Raiders	54	27	21	2	4	60
x-Oakville Blades	54	24	27	1	2	51
Brantford 99ers	54	22	29	0	3	47

=== South East Conference ===
South division	GP	W	L	T	OTL	PTS
z-Toronto Jr. Canadiens	54	41	12	1	0	83
x-North York Rangers	54	38	13	2	1	79
x-St. Michael's Buzzers	54	31	20	1	2	65
x-Toronto Patriots	54	19	30	0	5	43
Mississauga Chargers	54	7	45	0	2	16
Caledon Admirals	54	7	46	0	1	15

East division	GP	W	L	T	OTL	PTS
y-Wellington Dukes	54	34	13	0	7	75
x-Trenton Golden Hawks	54	36	16	0	2	74
x-Haliburton County Huskies	54	33	16	1	4	71
x-Cobourg Cougars	54	28	19	1	6	63
Lindsay Muskies	54	20	28	0	6	46

== Playoffs ==
Division Semifinals (Best of 3)	Division Finals (Best of 3)
N1	Pickering	2
N4	Stouffville	0
N1	Pickering	2
N2	Collingwood	0
N2	Collingwood	2
N3	Aurora	0
North West Conference
W1	Burlington	2
W4	Oakville	0
W1	Burlington	0
W2	Milton	2
W2	Milton	2
W3	Georgetown	0
S1	Toronto Jr. Canadians	2
S4	Toronto Patriots	0
S1	Toronto Jr. Canadiens	2
S2	North York	0
S2	North York	2
S3	St. Michael's	1
South East Conference
E1	Wellington	0
E4	Cobourg	2
E4	Cobourg	2
E3	Haliburton County	1
E2	Trenton	1
E3	Haliburton County	2

Conference Finals (Best of 5)
N1	Pickering	3
W2	Milton	0
S1	Toronto Jr. Canadians	3
E4	Cobourg	1

OJHL Final (Best of 7)
N1	Pickering	4
S1	Toronto Jr. Canadians	3
