= 2023–24 OJHL season =

- League: Ontario Junior Hockey League
- Sport: Hockey
- Teams: 24
- Finals champions: Collingwood Blues

OJHL seasons
- ← 2022–23 OJHL 2024–25 OJHL →

The 2023–24 season was the 29th season for the Ontario Junior Hockey League.

== League changes ==
- The Buffalo Jr. Sabres return from absence after COVID-19 pandemic
- The Leamington Flyers and the Niagara Falls Canucks transitioned from the Greater Ontario Junior Hockey League, to the Ontario Junior Hockey League, elevating their status from Junior B to Junior A.

== Regular season ==
Note: GP = Games played; W = Wins; L = Losses; OTL = Overtime losses; SL = Shootout losses; GF = Goals for; GA = Goals against; PTS = Points; x = clinched playoff berth; y = clinched conference title; z = clinched regular season title

=== East Conference ===
Rank	Team	GP	W	L	T	OTL	PTS
1	xy-Trenton Golden Hawks	56	43	11	1	1	88
2	x-St. Michael's Buzzers	56	34	15	1	6	75
3	x-Wellington Dukes	56	35	18	0	3	73
4	x-Haliburton County Huskies	56	33	19	3	1	70
5	x-Cobourg Cougars	56	31	18	3	4	69
6	x-Toronto Jr. Canadiens	56	31	19	3	3	68
7	x-Markham Royals	56	30	20	3	3	66
8	x-Stouffville Spirit	56	29	20	2	5	65
9	Lindsay Muskies	56	26	21	2	7	61
10	Pickering Panthers	56	15	35	1	5	36
11	Aurora Tigers	56	13	37	2	4	32
12	North York Rangers	56	8	45	1	2	19

=== West Conference ===
Rank	Team	GP	W	L	T	OTL	PTS
1	xyz-Collingwood Blues	56	49	6	0	1	99
2	x-Milton Menace	56	41	12	2	1	85
3	x-Leamington Flyers	56	34	14	5	3	76
4	x-Oakville Blades	56	32	20	1	3	68
5	x-Buffalo Jr. Sabres	56	31	20	0	5	67
6	x-Georgetown Raiders	56	30	21	1	4	65
7	x-Burlington Cougars	56	29	20	1	6	65
8	x-Brantford 99ers	56	26	26	0	4	56
9	Toronto Patriots	56	22	27	3	4	51
10	Niagara Falls Canucks	56	18	37	0	1	37
11	Caledon Admirals	56	10	40	1	5	26
12	Mississauga Chargers	56	4	48	0	4	12

=== Scoring leaders ===
Note: GP = Games played; G = Goals; A = Assists; Pts = Points; PIM = Penalty minutes

Player	Team	GP	G	A	Pts	PIM
Trevor Hoskin	Cobourg Cougars	52	42	58	100	34
Ryan Forberg	Markham Royals	56	45	52	97	20
Andy Reist	Cobourg Cougars	52	35	60	95	8
Patrick Saini	Haliburton County Huskies	56	44	50	94	2
Adam O'Marra	Trenton Golden Hawks	55	42	52	94	12
Ben-Chaim Lalkin	Markham Royals	42	50	38	88	30
Gavin Rocha	Markham Royals	56	20	68	88	42
Connor Driscoll	Milton Menace	52	28	55	83	71
David Elmy	St. Michael's Buzzers	56	44	37	81	24
Brandon Cohen	St. Michael's Buzzers	55	35	40	75	20

=== Leading goaltenders ===
Note: GP = Games played; Mins = Minutes played; W = Wins; L = Losses: OTL = Overtime losses;
T = Ties; GA = Goals Allowed; SO = Shutouts; GAA = Goals against average

Player	Team	GP	MINS	W	L	OTL	T	GA	SO	Sv%	GAA
Noah Pak	Collingwood Blues	42	2489	37	5	0	0	54	12	0.945	1.30
Brady Spry	Trenton Golden Hawks	22	1337	20	2	0	0	49	1	0.925	2.20
Sebastian Gatto	Leamington Flyers	30	1882	17	9	2	2	70	4	0.928	2.23
Benjamin Bonisteel	Trenton Golden Hawks	30	1815	20	9	1	0	68	6	0.926	2.25
Stephen Toltl	Stouffville Spirit	25	1441	15	7	0	1	55	2	0.921	2.29

== Playoffs ==
Conference Quarterfinals (Best of 7)	Conference Semi-Finals (Best of 7)
E1	Trenton	4
E8	Stouffville	0
E1	Trenton	4
E6	Toronto Jr. Canadiens	0
E2	St. Michael's	4
E7	Markham	0
East Conference
E3	Wellington	1
E6	Toronto Jr. Canadiens	4
E2	St. Michael's	3
E5	Cobourg	4
E4	Haliburton County	1
E5	Cobourg	4
W1	Collingwood	4
W8	Brantford	0
W1	Collingwood	4
W4	Oakville	1
W2	Milton	4
W7	Burlington	1
West Conference
W3	Leamington	4
W6	Georgetown	0
W2	Milton	1
W3	Leamington	4
W4	Oakville	4
W5	Buffalo	2

Conference Finals (Best of 7)
E1	Trenton	4
E5	Cobourg	2
W1	Collingwood	4
W3	Leamington	0

OJHL Final (Best of 7)
E1	Trenton	2
W1	Collingwood	4
