= King Rebellion =

Junior ice hockey team

King Rebeliion
- City: King, Ontario
- League: OJHL
- Conference: West
- Founded: 2024
- Home arena: Zancor Centre
- Colours
- Owner: Willa Wang
- General manager: Jay De Gennaro
- Head coach: Geoff Schomogyi
- Website: kingrebellionojhl.com

Franchise history
- 1966–1971: Milton Merchants
- 1971–1983: Milton Flyers
- 1983–1986: Milton Steamers
- 1986–2003: Milton Merchants
- 2003–2018: Milton Icehawks
- 2018–2024: Brantford 99ers
- 2024–present: King Rebellion

The King Rebellion is a junior ice hockey team in the Ontario Junior Hockey League based in King, Ontario. The team relocated to King Township after the 2023–24 OJHL season from Brantford, Ontario where it was known as the Brantford 99ers.

== Team identity ==
The name King Rebellion is a reference to King Township's part in the Upper Canada Rebellion of 1837, and is also the name of the King Township Minor Hockey Association’s rep teams.

== Arena ==
The team plays its home games at the Township-Wide Recreation Centre, also known as the Zancor Centre, in King Township. Construction of the facility began in April 2022 and was scheduled for completion in September 2024, however, a break-in at the site that resulted in damage to the mechanical systems delayed the completion until January 2025.

== History ==
The team debuted in the 2024–25 OJHL season after the franchise, which was formerly known as the Brantford 99ers, relocated to King Township and was rebranded as the King Rebellion.

The Rebellion finished the 2024–25 regular season in 7th place in the West conference, with a record of 24 wins, 25 losses, 2 ties and 5 overtime losses. In the post-season, they were eliminated after the first round of the playoffs after losing to the second-place Collingwood Blues 4-1.

Geoff Schomogyi was appointed as head coach in May 2025, replacing Mark Joslin.

Season-by-season record
Season	GP	W	L	OTL	T	GF	GA	Pts	Results	Playoffs
2024–25	56	24	25	2	5	164	181	55	7th in division 15th overall	Lost first round against Collingwood (4:1)
2025–26	56	29	24	1	2	172	149	61	7th in division 13th overall	Lost first round against Collingwood (4:0)

== Sources ==
- "King Rebellion is newest team in Ontario Junior Hockey League". NewmarketToday.ca. Village Media. 27 May 2024.
- "The OJHL approves the Brantford relocation to King City for the 2024-2025 season". YorkRegion.com. Metroland Media Group. 27 May 2024.
- "OJHL board approves relocation of Brantford to King Township for 2024-25 season". ojhl.ca (Press release). 27 May 2024.
- Gismondi, Angela (3 October 2023). "New $86M rec centre in King City will be a 'work of art'". Daily Commercial News. ConstructConnect Canada.
- Joseph, Simone (9 January 2024). "King residents get new rec centre, lose Nobleton pool". YorkRegion.com. Metroland Media Group.
- "King's Township-Wide Recreation Centre will officially be known as the Zancor Centre". Township Of King (Press release). 4 July 2024.
- Smiley, Brian (27 May 2024). "Junior A 99ers relocating". Brantford Expositor. Postmedia.
