= Collingwood Blues =

Collingwood Blues may refer to:

- Collingwood Blues (1988–2011)
- Collingwood Blues (2020)
