= 2017–18 OJHL season =

- League: Ontario Junior Hockey League
- Sport: Hockey
- Number of teams: 22
- Finals champions: Wellington Dukes

OJHL seasons
- ← 2016–17 OJHL 2018–19 OJHL →

The 2017–18 season was the 24th season for the Ontario Junior Hockey League.

== Standings ==
Note: GP = Games played; W = Wins; L = Losses; OTL = Overtime losses; SL = Shootout losses; GF = Goals for; GA = Goals against; PTS = Points; x = clinched playoff berth; y = clinched division title; z = clinched conference title

=== North East Conference ===
North division	GP	W	L	T	OTL	PTS
z-Aurora Tigers	54	36	12	1	5	78
x-Newmarket Hurricanes	54	33	14	6	1	73
x-Markham Royals	54	26	22	1	5	58
x-Pickering Panthers	54	26	24	1	3	56
Lindsay Muskies	54	11	40	0	3	25
Stouffville Spirit	54	8	43	2	1	19
East division	GP	W	L	T	OTL	PTS
y-Wellington Dukes	54	33	13	3	5	74
x-Kingston Voyageurs	54	31	19	2	2	66
x-Cobourg Cougars	54	29	20	2	3	63
x-Trenton Golden Hawks	54	24	26	2	2	52
Whitby Fury	54	18	31	4	1	41

=== South West Conference ===
South division	GP	W	L	T	OTL	PTS
z-Toronto Patriots	54	40	8	3	3	86
x-North York Rangers	54	37	11	1	5	80
x-Oakville Blades	54	38	13	2	1	79
x-Toronto Jr. Canadiens	54	33	18	1	2	69
x-St. Michael's Buzzers	54	24	25	3	2	53
Mississauga Chargers	54	19	29	4	2	44
West division	GP	W	L	T	OTL	PTS
y-Georgetown Raiders	54	36	12	3	3	78
x-Buffalo Jr. Sabres	54	26	22	0	6	58
x-Orangeville Flyers	54	22	25	1	6	51
Burlington Cougars	54	18	28	2	6	44
Milton Icehawks	54	4	47	0	3	11

== Playoffs ==
Conference quarterfinals	Conference semifinals
1	Aurora	4
8	Trenton	2
1	Aurora	4
5	Coubourg	1
2	Wellington	4
7	Pickering	3
North-East conference
3	Newmarket	4
6	Markham	2
2	Wellington	4
3	Newmarket	3
4	Kingston	1
5	Coubourg	4
Note: Pairings are re-seeded after the first round.
1	Toronto Patriots	4
8	Orangeville	0
1	Toronto Patriots	4
4	Oakville	3
2	Georgetown	4
7	St. Michael's	0
South-West conference
3	North York	4
6	Buffalo	0
2	Georgetown	4
3	North York	3
4	Oakville	4
5	Toronto Jr. Canadiens	2

Conference finals
1	Aurora	1
2	Wellington	4
1	Toronto Patriots	3
2	Georgetown	4

Finals
2	Wellington	4
2	Georgetown	2
