= 2018–19 OJHL season =

- League: Ontario Junior Hockey League
- Sport: Hockey
- Teams: 22
- Finals champions: Oakville Blades

OJHL seasons
- 2017–18 OJHL 2019–20 OJHL

The 2018-19 season was the 25th season for the Ontario Junior Hockey League.

== Team changes ==
- The Orangeville Flyers relocated to Brampton Ontario and were renamed the Brampton Admirals
- The Milton Icehawks relocated to Brantford Ontario and were renamed the Brantford 99ers. The move to Brantford was approved in the off-season by the OJHL, however, the Ontario Hockey Association refused to assign officials to Brantford's home opener in September, due to the OHA's refusal to approve the move to Brantford. All home games were moved to the Milton. However on October 21, 2018, a few hours after the Icehawk's home game, the OJHL announced that the team's move to Brantford was effective immediately.

== Standings ==
Note: GP = Games played; W = Wins; L = Losses; OTL = Overtime losses; SL = Shootout losses; GF = Goals for; GA = Goals against; PTS = Points; x = clinched playoff berth; y = clinched division title; z = clinched conference title

=== North West Conference ===
North division	GP	W	L	T	OTL	PTS
y-Markham Royals	54	29	18	2	5	65
x-Newmarket Hurricanes	54	26	20	3	5	60
x-Aurora Tigers	54	24	24	3	3	54
Pickering Panthers	55	23	29	0	3	49
Stouffville Spirit	54	12	37	1	4	29
West division	GP	W	L	T	OTL	PTS
z-Oakville Blades	54	44	5	2	3	93
x-Buffalo Jr. Sabres	54	27	17	3	8	65
x-Burlington Cougars	54	27	22	3	2	59
x-Brampton Admirals	54	24	23	1	6	55
x-Georgetown Raiders	55	24	24	3	4	55
Brantford 99ers	54	19	30	0	5	43

=== South East Conference ===
South division	GP	W	L	T	OTL	PTS
z-North York Rangers	54	40	9	1	4	85
x-St. Michael's Buzzers	54	30	22	0	2	62
x-Toronto Patriots	54	30	22	0	2	62
x-Toronto Jr. Canadiens	54	27	23	1	3	58
Mississauga Chargers	54	13	35	1	4	32
East division	GP	W	L	T	OTL	PTS
y-Cobourg Cougars	54	36	12	0	6	78
x-Trenton Golden Hawks	54	33	14	4	3	73
x-Whitby Fury	54	33	18	1	2	69
x-Wellington Dukes	54	29	19	1	5	64
Kingston Voyageurs	54	22	25	2	5	51
Lindsay Muskies	54	8	42	0	4	20

== Playoffs ==
Division Semifinals	Division Finals
W1	Oakville	4
W4	Brampton	1
W1	Oakville	4
W2	Buffalo	1
W2	Buffalo	4
W3	Burlington	3
North-West conference
N1	Markham	4
W5	Georgetown	2
S1	Markham	4
S2	Newmarket	3
N2	Newmarket	4
N3	Aurora	1
S1	North York	4
S4	Toronto Jr. Canadiens	1
S1	North York	4
S2	St. Michael's	0
S2	St. Michael's	4
S3	Toronto Patriots	3
South-East conference
E1	Cobourg	1
E4	Wellington	4
E3	Whitby	3
E4	Wellington	4
E2	Trenton	2
E3	Whitby	4

Conference finals
N1	Oakville	4
W1	Markham	1
S1	North York	3
E4	Wellington	4

Final
N1	Oakville	4
E4	Wellington	0
