= 2024 Centennial Cup =

Ice hockey national championship

2024 National championship
Centennial Cup

Tournament details
- City: Oakville, Ontario
- Venue: Sixteen Mile Sports Complex
- Dates: 9–19 May 2024
- Teams: 10
- Host team: Oakville Blades

Final positions
- Champions: Collingwood Blues
- Runners-up: Melfort Mustangs

Tournament statistics
- Games played: 25

Awards
- MVP: Julien Gervais

Official website
- Hockey Canada

The 2024 Centennial Cup was the Canadian Junior Hockey League (CJHL) championship for the 2023–24 season won by the Collingwood Blues of the Ontario Junior Hockey League. It was the 52nd Canadian junior A ice hockey national championship and took place at the Sixteen Mile Sports Complex in Oakville, Ontario from May 9 to 19, 2024. The competition included all nine CJHL champions and hosts the Oakville Blades.

== Format ==
The format consisted of a 4-game round-robin with two groups of five teams, followed by a six-team single-elimination play-off. The top team from each group of the round-robin had a bye to the semifinal round.

== Competing teams ==
The tournament included the championship teams from the 9 leagues in the Canadian Junior Hockey League and the Oakville Blades.

=== Calgary Canucks ===
The Calgary Canucks qualified as the Inter Pipeline Cup champions of the Alberta Junior Hockey League.

Regular season: 31-23-1-2 (3rd in AJHL)
playoffs: Defeated Grande Prairie Storm 4-2, Defeated Drumheller Dragons 4-1, Defeated Whitecourt Wolverines 4–0

=== Melfort Mustangs ===
The Melfort Mustangs qualified as the Canterra Seeds Cup champions of the Saskatchewan Junior Hockey League.

Regular season: 38-14-3-1 (2nd in SJHL)
Playoffs: Defeated Estevan Bruins 4-1, Defeated Humboldt Broncos 4-3, Defeated Flin Flon Bombers 4–2

=== Winkler Flyers ===
The Winkler Flyers qualified as the Turnbull Cup champions of the Manitoba Junior Hockey League.

Regular season: 42-11-2-3 (2nd in MJHL)
Playoffs: Defeated Portage Terriers 4-1, Defeated Virden Oil Capitals 4-2 Defeated Steinbach Pistons 4–0

=== Sioux Lookout Bombers ===
The Sioux Lookout Bombers qualified as the Bill Salonen Cup champions of the Superior International Junior Hockey League.

Regular season: 35-10-2-2 (2nd in SIJHL)
Playoffs: Defeated Fort Frances Lakers 4-0, Defeated Thunder Bay North Stars 4-1, Defeated Kam River Fighting Walleye 4–0

=== Greater Sudbury Cubs ===
The Greater Sudbury Cubs qualified as the Copeland Cup champions of the Northern Ontario Junior Hockey League.

Regular season: 43-12-1-2 (2nd in NOJHL)
Playoffs: Defeated Soo Thunderbirds 4-2, defeated Blind River Beavers 4-1, defeated Powassan Voodoos 4–1

=== Collingwood Blues ===
The Collingwood Blues qualified as the Buckland Cup champions of the Ontario Junior Hockey League.

Regular season: 49-6-0-1 (1st in OJHL)
Playoffs: Defeated Brantford 99ers 4-0, Defeated Oakville Blades 4-1, Defeated Leamington Flyers 4-0, Defeated Trenton Golden Hawks 4–2

=== Navan Grads ===
The Navan Grads qualified as the Bogart Cup champions of the Central Canada Hockey League.

Regular season: 41-9-3-2 (1st in CCHL)
Playoffs: Defeated Pembroke Lumber Kings 4-2, Defeated Rockland Nationals 4-1, Defeated Smiths Falls Bears 4–2

=== Collège Français de Longueuil ===
The Collège Français de Longueuil qualified as the NAPA Cup champions of the Quebec Junior Hockey League.

Regular season: 30-14-2-2 (4th in LHJQ)
Playoffs: Defeated Laval VC 4-0, Defeated Terrebonne Cobras 4-3, Defeated L'Everest de la Côte du Sud 4–3

=== Miramichi Timberwolves ===
The Miramichi Timberwolves qualified as the Metalfab Cup champions of the Maritime Hockey League (MHL). Despite finishing the regular season in fourth place, the Timberwolves managed to reach the final round of the MHL playoffs and defeat the first-place Summerside Western Capitals in six games. It was the Timberwolves' first league championship in franchise history.

Regular season: 31-16-3-2 (4th in MHL)
Playoffs: Defeated West Kent Steamers 4-1, Defeated Edmundston Blizzard 4-0, Defeated Summerside Western Capitals 4–2

=== Oakville Blades ===
The Oakville Blades of the Ontario Junior Hockey League were admitted to the tournament by virtue of being the host team.

Regular season: 32-20-1-3 (9th in OJHL)
Playoffs: Defeated Buffalo Jr. Sabres 4-2, defeated by Collingwood Blues 1–4

=== Map of competing teams ===
Canadian Junior Hockey League

== Round Robin ==
The top 3 teams from each group advanced to the playoffs, and the 1st place teams in each group had a bye to the semifinals.

	Group A	CB	CC	NG	GSC	CFL
1	Collingwood Blues		5-4	3-2	10-2	8-0
2	Calgary Canucks	4-5		4-3	3-2	5-1
3	Navan Grads	2-3	3-4		5-1	5-1
4	Greater Sudbury Cubs	2-10	2-3	1-5		6-0
5	Collège Français de Longueuil	0-8	1-5	1-5	0-6	

	Group B	MM	MT	WF	OB	SLB
1	Melfort Mustangs		4-1	6-5	3-1	5-3
2	Miramichi Timberwolves	1-4		3-2	7-4	5-3
3	Winkler Flyers	5-6	2-3		4-0	4-2
4	Oakville Blades	1-3	4-7	0-4		5-2
5	Sioux Lookout; Bombers	3-5	3-5	2-4	2-5	

== Playoffs ==
Quarterfinals
Miramichi Timberwolves	8
Navan Grads	4
Calgary Canucks	4
Winkler Flyers	2

Semifinals
Collingwood Blues	5
Miramichi Timberwolves	2
Melfort Mustangs	2
Calgary Canucks	1

Finals
Collingwood Blues	1
Melfort Mustangs	0

== Awards ==
Roland Mercier Trophy (Tournament MVP): Julien Gervais, Calgary Canucks
Top Forward: Dalton Andrew, Winkler Flyers
Top Defencemen: Leith Olafson, Melfort Mustangs
Top Goaltender: Jaeden Nelson, Navan Grads
Tubby Schmalz Trophy (Sportsmanship): Riley Hearn, Calgary Canucks
Top Scorer: Dylan Hudon, Collingwood Blues
Julien Gervais, Calgary Canucks
