= Preston Raiders =

- City: Cambridge, Ontario
- League: Central Junior B Hockey League
- Operated: 1965-1977
- Home arena: Preston Community Centre
- Colours: Unknown

Franchise history
- 19xx-1965: Preston Pals
- 1965-1976: Preston Raiders
- 1976-1977: Cambridge Raiders

The Preston Raiders were a Canadian Junior "B" ice hockey team from the town of Preston, Ontario which later became Cambridge, Ontario.

== History ==
The team started out as the Preston Pals of the Central Junior C Hockey League. They changed their name to the Raiders in 1965.

In 1969, the Preston Raiders joined the Central Junior 'B' Hockey League. In 1974, the team left the Central league and joined the Waterloo-Wellington Junior 'B' Hockey League, which was a predecessor league to the current Midwestern Junior B Hockey League. In 1976, the team became the Cambridge Raiders for one season, before folding.

== Season-by-season record ==
Season	GP	W	L	T	OTL	GF	GA	P	Results	Playoffs
1957-58	28	3	25	0	-	--	--	6	7th WOJBHL	
1958-59	30	7	22	1	-	125	191	15	5th CJBHL	
1959-61	Statistics Not Available									
1961-62	30	13	15	2	-	149	142	28	3rd CJCHL	
1962-63	30	18	6	6	-	207	137	42	2nd CJCHL	
1963-64	30	13	15	2	-	174	189	28	4th CJCHL	
1964-65	31	16	14	1	-	203	194	33	5th CJCHL	
1965-66	31	9	20	2	-	125	169	20	10th CJCHL	
1966-67	24	10	9	5	-	94	92	25	4th WJCHL	
1967-68	Statistics Not Available									
1968-69	30	14	13	3	-	142	127	31	3rd WJCHL	
1969-70	40	11	27	2	-	176	261	24	6th CJBHL	
1970-71	42	16	23	3	-	183	234	35	4th CJBHL	
1971-72	42	14	22	6	-	167	195	34	6th CJBHL	
1972-73	42	14	25	3	-	194	234	31	6th CJBHL	
1973-74	42	3	37	2	-	138	368	8	8th CJBHL	
1974-75	39	3	34	2	-	117	290	8	6th WWJHL	
1975-76	42	16	20	6	-	243	256	38	5th WWJHL	Lost quarter-final
1976-77	39	3	33	3	-	151	308	9	6th WWJHL	DNQ
