= Collingwood Blues (2020) =

Junior ice hockey team

- City: Collingwood, Ontario
- League: OJHL
- Division: North
- Founded: 2019
- Home arena: Eddie Bush Memorial Arena
- Colours
- General manager: Andrew Campoli
- Head coach: Andrew Campoli
- Website: cwoodblues.com

Franchise history
- 1974-2019: Kingston Voyageurs
- 2019–2020: Collingwood Colts

The Collingwood Blues are a junior ice hockey team in the Ontario Junior Hockey League (OJHL) based in Collingwood, Ontario, and the 2024 Centennial Cup national championship team.

== History ==
The team came into being with sale and relocation of the Kingston Voyageurs to Collingwood after the 2018–19 OJHL season. The Kingston Voyageurs had been a league staple since 1974. After the 2019–20 OJHL season, the team was rebranded the Collingwood Blues.

The 2020–21 OJHL season was cancelled due to public health restrictions related to the COVID-19 pandemic.

The Blues won consecutive league championships in 2023 and 2024. They went on to win the 2024 Centennial Cup national championship tournament in 2024.

== Arena ==
The team plays its home games at the Eddie Bush Memorial Arena in Collingwood. In 2024, the team entered a 10-year agreement with the Town of Collingwood to continue its use of facility, following protracted negotiations. The agreement included the option to renew for a further 10 years.

== Season-by-season results ==
The team won its second consecutive league championship in 2024 and went on to win the national championship 2024 Centennial Cup.

Season statistics
Season	GP	W	L	T	OTL	GF	GA	Pts	Finish	Playoffs
2019–20	54	27	17	1	9	164	155	64	2nd of 5 North Div; 5th of 11 NW Conf; 10th of 22 OJHL	Lost Conf. Quarters 3-4 (Spirit)
2020–21	Season cancelled									
2021–22	54	28	20	1	4	170	140	61	2nd of 5 North Div; 4th of 10 NW Conf; 11th of 21 OJHL	Lost Conf. Quarters 2-0 (Tigers); Lost Conf Semifinals 0-2 (Panthers)
2022–23	54	44	9	0	1	226	113	89	1st of 10 NW Conf; 2nd of 21 OJHL	Won Conf. Quarters 4-0 (Spirit); Won Conf Semifinals 4-0 (Menace); Won Conf Finals 4-1 (Cougars); Won League Finals 4-1 (Golden Hawks) advance to Centennial Cup
2023–24	56	49	6	0	1	284	88	99	1st of 12 NW Conf; 1st of 24 OJHL	Won Conf. Quarters 4-0 (99ers); Won Conf Semifinals 4-1 (Blades); Won Conf Finals 4-0 (Flyers); Won League Finals 2-4 (Golden Hawks); Won National Championship; 1-0 (Melfort Mustangs)
2024–25	56	43	9	3	1	256	113	90	2nd of 12 West Conf; 3rd of 24 OJHL	Won Conf. Quarters 4-1 (Rebellion); Lost Conf Semifinals 1-4 (Menace)
2025–26	56	41	10	2	3	250	118	87	2nd in division 3rd overall	Won first round against King (4:0); Won second round against Leamington (4:1)

Source: "Collingwood Blues statistics and history". hockeydb.com.

== National championships ==
In 2022, the Centennial Cup moved to a 10-team format, including the champions from each of the nine leagues that make up the CJHL, and the host team, thus eliminating the intervening regional contests for the ANAVET Cup, the Fred Page Cup and the Doyle Cup. The format consists of a 4-game round-robin with two groups of five teams, followed by a six-team single-elimination play-off.

=== 2023 Centennial Cup ===
2023 National championship
Centennial Cup

Tournament details
- City: Portage la Prairie
- Venue: Stride Place
- Dates: 11–21 May 2023
- Teams: 10
- Host team: Portage Terriers

Final positions
- Champions: Brooks Bandits
- Runners-up: Battlefords North Stars

Tournament statistics
- Games played: 25

Awards
- MVP: Aiden Fink

Official website
- Hockey Canada

The 2023 Centennial Cup tournament took place at Stride Place in Portage la Prairie, Manitoba from 11 – 21 May 2023. It was the second year of the 10-team format, including the championship teams of nine CJHL affiliate leagues and the host team, the Portage Terriers. The Portage Terriers and city of Portage la Prairie were to be the host for the 2020 Centennial Cup, but were renamed as the 2023 host when the 2020 tournament was cancelled at the onset of the COVID-19 pandemic.

Round-robin	Record	Standing	Quarterfinal	Semifinal	Championship
OTW, Steinbach Pistons (ManJHL), 2–1; W, Battlefords North Stars (SJHL), 3–1; W, Kam River Fighting Walleye (SIJHL), 4–1; L, Portage Terriers (Host), 3-4	2-1-1-0	3rd of 5 Pool B	Lost - 2–4; Ottawa Jr. Senators (CCHL)	Did not Qualify	Did not Qualify

=== 2024 Centennial Cup ===
2024 National championship
Centennial Cup

Tournament details
- City: Oakville, Ontario
- Venue: Sixteen Mile Sports Complex
- Dates: 9–19 May 2024
- Teams: 10
- Host team: Oakville Blades

Final positions
- Champions: Collingwood Blues
- Runners-up: Melfort Mustangs

Tournament statistics
- Games played: 25

Awards
- MVP: Julien Gervais

Official website
- Hockey Canada

The 2024 Centennial Cup was hosted by the Oakville Blades at the Sixteen Mile Sports Complex in Oakville, Ontario from 9 – 19 2024.

Round-robin	Record	Standing	Quarterfinal	Semifinal	Championship
W, Calgary Canucks (AJHL), 5–4; W, Greater Sudbury Cubs (NOJHL), 10–2; W, Longueuil Collège Français (QJHL), 8–0; W, Navan Grads (CCHL), 3-2	4-0-0-0	1st of 5 Group A	Earned bye	Won 5–2; Miramichi Timberwolves	Won 1–0; Melfort Mustangs; Centennial Cup; National Junior A Champions
