= Mid-Western Junior Hockey League =

Junior ice hockey league in Ontario, Canada

- Association: Ontario Hockey Association
- Founded: 1973
- Ceased: 2007
- Last champion(s): Cambridge Winterhawks (2007)

The Mid-Western Junior Hockey League (MWJHL) was a junior ice hockey league in Ontario, Canada, sanctioned by the Ontario Hockey Association from 1973 until 2007. In 2007, the league became a division of the newly formed Greater Ontario Junior Hockey League along with the Western Ontario Hockey League and Golden Horseshoe Junior Hockey League.

- Southwestern Junior "B" Hockey League 1973 - 1974
- Waterloo-Wellington Junior "B" Hockey League 1974 - 1977
- Mid-Western Junior "B" Hockey League 1977 - 2007

== History ==
The Mid-Western "B" was known as the Waterloo-Wellington Junior "B" Hockey League until 1977 when it donned its current name. Before 1974, the league was known as the Southwestern Junior "B" Hockey League for one season. The league was founded in 1973, taking aboard Kitchener Ranger Bs, Waterloo Siskins from the Western Jr. B league, and expansion teams the Caledonia Corvairs and Brantford Diamond Kings. A year later the Stratford Warriors joined the Waterloo-Wellington league, along with the Preston Raiders, Hespeler Shamrocks and Elmira Sugar Kings.

As there is little information about the league pre-1977, it is easy to say that the Mid-Western "B" was easily dominated by the Stratford Cullitons and the Waterloo Siskins for the first fourteen years of its current existence. Stratford won 8 championships in the league's early years, with Waterloo close behind with 6, but all other charter members were left without glory until the Kitchener Dutchmen won their first championship in 1992. Since then, the Cullitons have won 5 league championships and the Siskins have won only once, making way for other teams like the Elmira Sugar Kings, the Dutchmen, and the Cambridge Winterhawks.

In 2007, the MWJHL merged with the Western Ontario Hockey League and the Golden Horseshoe Junior Hockey League to create the Greater Ontario Junior Hockey League.

== 2007-08 season ==
For information on the 2007-08 season, please see: Greater Ontario Junior Hockey League.

== Final teams ==
These are the teams that were in the league during its final independent season (2006-07).

- Brantford Golden Eagles
- Cambridge Winterhawks
- Elmira Sugar Kings
- Guelph Dominators
- Kitchener Dutchmen
- Listowel Cyclones
- Owen Sound Greys
- Stratford Cullitons
- Waterloo Siskins

== Other former members ==
- Brantford Diamond Kings
- Caledonia Corvairs
- Guelph Holody Platers
- New Hamburg Hahns
- Orangeville Crushers
- Preston Raiders

== Cherrey Cup Playoff Champions ==
Year	Champion	Finalist	Result in Provincials
Southwestern Junior B Hockey League
1974	Elmira Sugar Kings		Lost QF vs. Owen Sound (MO)
Waterloo-Wellington Junior B Hockey League
1975	Waterloo Siskins
1976	Waterloo Siskins		Lost QF vs. Collingwood (MO)
1977	Stratford Cullitons		Won SC vs. Streetsville (C)
Mid-Western Junior B Hockey League
1978	Stratford Cullitons	Waterloo Siskins	Won SC vs. Streetsville (C)
1979	Stratford Cullitons	Elmira Sugar Kings	Lost QF vs. Windsor (WO)
1980	Waterloo Siskins	Stratford Cullitons	Lost QF vs. Windsor (WO)
1981	Stratford Cullitons	Kitchener Ranger B's	Lost Final vs. Burlington (C)
1982	Stratford Cullitons	Kitchener Ranger B's	Lost SF vs. Sarnia (WO)
1983	Stratford Cullitons	Waterloo Siskins	Lost Final vs. Henry Carr (Met)
1984	Waterloo Siskins	Stratford Cullitons	Won SC vs. Streetsville (C)
1985	Waterloo Siskins	Stratford Cullitons	Won SC vs. Bramalea (Met)
1986	Stratford Cullitons	Waterloo Siskins	Won SC vs. Streetsville (C)
1987	Stratford Cullitons	Elmira Sugar Kings	Lost QF vs. Niagara Falls (GH)
1988	Waterloo Siskins	Elmira Sugar Kings	Won SC vs. Bramalea (Met)
1989	Waterloo Siskins	Stratford Cullitons
1990	Stratford Cullitons	Waterloo Siskins	Won SC vs. St. Catharines (GH)
1991	Waterloo Siskins	Stratford Cullitons	Won SC vs. Oakville (C)
1992	Kitchener Dutchmen	Stratford Cullitons	Won SC vs. Milton (C)
1993	Kitchener Dutchmen	Stratford Cullitons	Lost Final vs. Barrie (C)
1994	Waterloo Siskins	Cambridge Winterhawks	Won SC vs. St. Catharines (GH)
1995	Stratford Cullitons	Elmira Sugar Kings	Won SC vs. St. Thomas (WO)
1996	Stratford Cullitons	Owen Sound Greys	Lost in Round Robin
1997	Elmira Sugar Kings	Stratford Cullitons	Won SC vs. St. Catharines (GH)
1998	Elmira Sugar Kings	Stratford Cullitons	Lost Final vs. Niagara Falls (GH)
1999	Stratford Cullitons	Cambridge Winterhawks	Lost Final vs. Chatham (WO)
2000	Cambridge Winterhawks	Owen Sound Greys	Won SC vs. St. Catharines (GH)
2001	Elmira Sugar Kings	Cambridge Winterhawks	Won SC vs. Thorold (GH)
2002	Elmira Sugar Kings	Stratford Cullitons	Lost Final vs. Sarnia (WO)
2003	Stratford Cullitons	Kitchener Dutchmen	Won SC vs. Thorold (GH)
2004	Stratford Cullitons	Kitchener Dutchmen	Won SC vs. Thorold (GH)
2005	Listowel Cyclones	Owen Sound Greys	Lost in Round Robin
2006	Cambridge Winterhawks	Brantford Golden Eagles	Won SC vs. Niagara Falls (GH)
2007	Cambridge Winterhawks	Elmira Sugar Kings	Won SC vs. Strathroy (WO)

== Records ==
Taken from league 25th Anniversary Program.

- Best record: 1985-86 Stratford Cullitons (36-3-1)
- Worst record: 1997-98 Ohsweken Golden Eagles (0-47-1)
- Largest margin of victory: Waterloo Siskins 23 - Listowel Cyclones 3 on December 11, 1983
- Most goals, one season: Jason Mervyn (79) -- 1991-92 Stratford Cullitons
- Most assists, one season: Dan Haylow (98) -- 1989-90 Owen Sound Greys
- Most points, one season: Erik Anderson (145) -- 1996-97 Stratford Cullitons
- Most goals, career: Ron White (163) -- 143 games with the Stratford Cullitons
- Most assists, career: Jamie Hartnett (212) -- 188 games with Stratford Cullitons
- Most points, career: Jamie Hartnett (371) -- 188 games with Stratford Cullitons
- Most penalty minutes, season: Chris Brine (398) -- 1993-94 Cambridge Winterhawks
- Lowest goals against average, one season: Greg Dreveny (1.96) -- 1988-89 Waterloo Siskins
- Most shutouts, one season: Matt Barnes (6) -- 1993-94 Stratford Cullitons
