= Ontario Junior Hockey League =

Canadian ice hockey league, founded 1955

- Regions: Greater Toronto Area; Central Ontario; Southwestern Ontario
- Former names: list: Central Junior B Hockey League (1954–1992); Central Junior A Hockey League (1992–1993); Ontario Provincial Junior A Hockey League (1993–2008); Central Canadian Hockey League (2009–2010); Ontario Junior A Hockey League (2009–2010); Ontario Junior Hockey League (2008–2009, 2010–Present)
- Founded: 1954
- No. of teams: 24
- Associated title: Buckland Cup (OJHL), Centennial Cup (CJHL)
- Recent champions: Trenton Golden Hawks (2025)
- Most successful club: Brampton Capitals, St. Michael's Buzzers, Wellington Dukes & Oakville Blades (3 each)
- Headquarters: Mississauga
- Website: www.ojhl.ca

The Ontario Junior Hockey League (OJHL) is a Junior A ice hockey league in Ontario, Canada. It is under the supervision of the Ontario Hockey Association (OHA) and the Canadian Junior Hockey League (CJHL).

With 24 member clubs, the Ontario Junior Hockey League stands as the Canadian Junior Hockey League's largest Junior A circuit, maintaining its position as a crucial stepping stone for aspiring hockey players across the province.

The league's roots trace back to 1993-94, when it emerged from the Central Junior B Hockey League under its original name, the Ontario Provincial Junior A Hockey League. Operating under the Ontario Hockey Association and CJHL banners, the organization has built a reputation for advancing talent to higher levels of competition.

The 2024-25 season demonstrated the league's continued success in player placement, with more than 135 commitments secured. NCAA Division 1 programs claimed 54 players, while the Ontario Hockey League recruited 29. The OJHL's partnership with the OHL extended further through 39 affiliate players who collectively appeared in 152 OHL games throughout the season.

The league's impact reaches the sport's highest level, with 30 former OJHL players on NHL rosters as the 2025-26 season begins. This pipeline spans multiple destinations, including U SPORTS universities, NCAA programs, Canadian Hockey League teams, and professional minor leagues.

The league dates back to 1954 where it began as the "Central Junior B Hockey League". In 1993, the Central Junior B Hockey League was promoted to the Junior A level and renamed the "Ontario Provincial Junior A Hockey League". In 2009, the league was dissolved by the Ontario Hockey Association and split into two leagues: the "Central Canadian Hockey League" and the "Ontario Junior A Hockey League". By early 2010, the two leagues merged to reform the Ontario Junior Hockey League.

The league has 24 members, from Leamington in the west, to Wellington in the East, south to Buffalo, NY, and north to Collingwood and Haliburton County

The winner of the OJHL playoffs and Frank L. Buckland Trophy compete for the Centennial Cup with the winners of the eight remaining tier two junior A leagues across Canada and the host team. The OJHL's Collingwood Blues won the national championship in 2024. Prior to the COVID-19 pandemic taking place, there were qualifier tournaments held around the country (only four champions and a host would show up to the national championship - the tournament has increased in duration and for clubs attending).

== History ==
=== Central Junior B Hockey League ===
==== 1954 to 1971 ====
In 1954, a variety of teams from different leagues and Ontario Hockey Association junior groupings were put together in the Central Junior B Hockey League. The Central League was formed as a sister league to the Western Ontario Junior B Hockey League that had been running since 1950. During the early years, the two leagues were regarded as the two divisions of the OHA's Big 10. The "Big" moniker was often given to OHA leagues as the OHA pushed away from smaller rural multi-level groupings.

The 1954–55 season's members were the Woodstock Warriors, Owen Sound Greys, Waterloo Siskins, Burlington Mohawks, Paris Redshirts, Dundas Flyers, and Ingersoll Reems. Woodstock took the first ever Central League crown as well as that year's Sutherland Cup as provincial champions.

From 1955 until 1964, the Waterloo Siskins won the league six out of nine seasons, losing out to Burlington in 1957 and 1958 and the Owen Sound Greys in 1961. Neither Burlington or Owen Sound managed to win the Sutherland Cup with their league championship, in fact only Owen Sound even made to the finals where they were swept by the St. Michael's Buzzers of the Metro Junior B Hockey League. During that streak, the Waterloo Siskins won the Sutherland Cup four times. In 1956 they defeated the Brampton Regents of the Metro league 4-games-to-1 with 1 tie. In 1960, the Siskins defeated the Marlboros of the Metro League 4-games-to-2 with 1 tie to win the provincial crown. In 1962, they defeated the St. Thomas Elgins of the Western Junior B League 4-games-to-1 and in 1964 they defeated Weston of the Metro League 4-games-to-1 to claim another crown.

In 1964, began a four-year dynasty for the Kitchener Greenshirts. In 1965, 1966, 1967, and 1968, the Greenshirts were Central League champions. They also won the Sutherland Cup in 1965 by defeating Etobicoke of the Metro League 4-games-to-2 and in 1967 by defeating the Metro League's Dixie Beehives 4-games-to-2.

In 1968, their sister league, the Western Ontario Junior B Hockey League, went renegade and left the Ontario Hockey Association. As a result, the Strathroy Rockets were homeless and joined the league. In their only year in the CJBHL they won the league championship and lost the Sutherland Cup final 4-games-to-1 with 1 tie to the Markham Waxers of the Metro League.

In 1969, the Collingwood Blues jumped up to the Central League and stayed until the realignment of 1971, winning both league championships (1970 and 1971). The Blues failed to make the provincial final in either of those years.

The teams of the 1970–71 season were the Owen Sound Greys, Collingwood Blues, Waterloo Siskins, Preston Raiders, and Kitchener Ranger B's. This would be the final incarnation of the league in its original setup. Much change happened in the summer of 1971.

==== 1971 to 1993 ====
In 1971, the league re-aligned itself geographically. The Owen Sound Greys and Collingwood Blues jumped to the Mid-Ontario Junior B Hockey League. The Waterloo Siskins and Kitchener Ranger B's moved over to the Western Ontario Junior B Hockey League. The Burlington Mohawks were the only team to stay put. In return, the Central League gained many teams from the Mid-Ontario Junior B Hockey League, like the Oakville Blades, Milton Flyers, Hespeler Shamrocks and Streetsville Derbys. They also gained the Dundas Blues and the Brampton Vic Woods.

The 1972 champion is unknown, but in 1973 Burlington won the Central League and in 1974 and 1975 Oakville won two straight league titles. The 1974–75 season was special for the Oakville Blades. After winning the league championship, they won their way all the way to the Sutherland Cup final. Unfortunately for the Blades, the Bramalea Blues of the Metro Junior B Hockey League awaited them. The Blues defeated the Blades 4-games-to-3.

From the 1975–76 season until the 1979–80 season, the Central League was dominated by the Streetsville Derbys. In this span, the Derbys won the League title five straight times, made the Ontario finals three times, and won the Sutherland Cup once. In 1977, the Derbys made the All-Ontario final. In the final, they lost to the Stratford Cullitons of the Waterloo-Wellington Junior B Hockey League 4-games-to-2. A year later, the Derbys again met the Stratford Cullitons (now of the Mid-Western Junior B Hockey League), but lost 9-points-to-5. The 1978–79 season had the Derbys make the Sutherland Cup final for the third straight year. In the final, the Derbys met the St. Catharines Falcons of the Golden Horseshoe Junior B Hockey League and defeated them 4-games-to-none to finally win a provincial title.

In 1978 the Mid-Ontario league folded, and Orillia Terriers, Thornhill Thunderbirds, the Barrie Colts, and Oak Ridges Dynes joined the Central League.

The 1980–81 season had a team other than the Derbys show dominance, as the Burlington Cougars won the Central League championship. They kept on winning and found themselves in the Sutherland Cup final. The Cougars came up against the Stratford Cullitons of the Mid-Western League and were victorious, winning 8-points-to-4. In 1982, the Oakville Blades won the Central league for the first time in seven years.

From the 1982–83 season until the 1985–86 season, the Streetsville Derbys celebrated another period of dominance. In those four seasons, the Derbys won three league championships, made the Ontario final twice, and received a harsh punishment from the Ontario Hockey Association. In 1982–83, the Derbys won their first league title in three season, a year later they won it again and battled all the way to the Sutherland Cup final. In the final, the Derbys met the Waterloo Siskins of the Mid-Western League and despite a spirited performance, fell 4-games-to-3 to the Siskins. A year later, the Derbys failed to get out of their league. In 1985–86, the Derbys dominated the Central League again and won their third title in four years. They battled to the Sutherland Cup final and again met the Stratford Cullitons of the Mid-Western League. The Cullitons swept the series, 4-games-to-none, and the Derbys lost their discipline. The result was a one-year ban for the Streetsville Derbys from Ontario Hockey Association play. The Derbys were forced to sit out in 1986–87, as the Burlington Cougars won the league, and the Derbys never won another Central League title.

From the 1987–88 season until the 1989–90 season, the Barrie Colts dominated the league with three straight championships. None of these championships transpired into a Sutherland Cup.

In 1991, the Oakville Blades won the Central League, but lost the Sutherland Cup final to the Waterloo Siskins 4-games-to-none. In 1992, the Milton Merchants won the league championship, but also fell in the Sutherland Cup final, this time to the Kitchener Dutchmen. During the summer of 1992, the OHA promoted the Central League to Junior A status, allowing its teams less limitations on signing players then an average Junior B team would have. In 1992–93, the Barrie Colts dominated the CJAHL. With 47 wins and one tie, the Colts celebrated an unheard of undefeated season. They won the Central League championship, and were granted permission to compete in the Provincial Junior B playdowns. In the final of the Sutherland Cup, they met the Kitchener Dutchmen and swept them 4-games-to-none to win the Central League its third and final Sutherland Cup since 1971. The 1993 playoff run, aided by their Junior A status, was the final and most successful Provincial Jr. B playoff run of any Central League champion in at least twelve years.

The 1992–93 season would be the final Junior B season for the Central League. The teams in the league that year were the Barrie Colts, Markham Waxers, Peterborough Jr. Petes, Newmarket 87's, Orillia Terriers, Lindsay Bears, Ajax Axemen, Collingwood Blues, and Cobourg Cougars in the East Division and the Brampton Capitals, Burlington Cougars, Milton Merchants, Caledon Canadians, Oakville Blades, Streetsville Derbys (played that season in Mississauga), Georgetown Raiders, and Royal York Rangers in the West Division.

=== Ascension to Junior "A" ===
Logo 1993–2008

In 1988, the Metro Junior B Hockey League left the Ontario Hockey Association. In 1991, it declared itself a Junior A hockey league and a couple seasons later was recognized by the Canadian Junior A Hockey League. In response, the Ontario Hockey Association took the Central Junior B Hockey League, the remaining Junior B league closest to Toronto, and promoted it to Junior A. The league changed its name to the Ontario Provincial Junior A Hockey League, the original name of the old Junior A League that lasted from 1972 to 1987.

The first ever OPJHL champion was the Orillia Terriers in 1994. Despite much of the hype going into the Ontario Hockey Association Junior A championship round robin, the Terriers lost 3–1 to the Caledon Canadians of the Metro Junior A Hockey League in the OHA final. The other competitors were the Metro's Wexford Raiders and the NOJHL's Powassan Hawks. In the summer of 1994, the Barrie Colts left the OPJHL to play in the Ontario Hockey League.

In 1995, the Brampton Capitals won the OPJHL's crown, the Buckland Cup, and gained a berth into the Dudley Hewitt Cup round robin in Thunder Bay. In the round robin, the Capitals went undefeated, beating the Metro's Caledon Canadians 4–1, the NOJHL's Timmins Golden Bears 5-3 and the USHL's Thunder Bay Flyers 5–2. Their undefeated record gave the Capitals a bye directly into the DHC final, which they lost in a 6-4 heart-breaker to the Thunder Bay Flyers.

The summer of 1995 brought crisis to the rival Metro Junior A Hockey League. In the midst of perceived corruption by the league, five teams walked away from the Metro. Four of these teams; the Bramalea Blues, Kingston Voyageurs, Mississauga Chargers, and St. Michael's Buzzers; fled to join the Ontario Provincial Junior A Hockey League.

In 1996, The Newmarket 87's were OPJHL champions. They went to the Dudley Hewitt Cup in Cobourg, Ontario to compete for the Central Canadian Championship. Also attending from the OPJHL were the Cobourg Cougars as hosts and the Brampton Capitals as OPJHL finalists. Cobourg lost to the Thunder Bay Flyers 5–3, defeated the Rayside-Balfour Sabrecats 5–3, before losing to both Newmarket and Brampton. Newmarket defeated Rayside-Balfour 4–3, Cobourg 3–1, lost to Brampton, and then Thunder Bay 3–2. The Capitals were undefeated in the round robin, defeating Thunder Bay 5–2, Rayside-Balfour 10–6, Newmarket 6–3, and Cobourg 9–3. All three OPJHL teams made the tournament's semi-finals. In the first semi-final, Brampton defeated Cobourg 5–2, while Newmarket beat Thunder Bay 6–3. This results in a rematch of the OPJHL final in the Dudley Hewitt Cup final. The Newmarket 87's crushed Brampton 8–2. Next, Newmarket flew out to Melfort, Saskatchewan to compete in the Royal Bank Cup 1996. In their first game they defeated the BCHL's Vernon Vipers 7–5, then the SJHL's Yorkton Terriers 5–2. It all went downhill from there as the 87's then lost to the host Melfort Mustangs 11–3, the MJAHL's Moncton Beavers 4–3, and were defeated in the semi-final by Vernon 7–4. This ended the OPJHL's first odyssey in the Royal Bank Cup.

The 1996–97 season was won by the Milton Merchants. In a best-of-7 for the Dudley Hewitt Cup against the NOJHL's Rayside-Balfour Sabrecats, the Merchants were defeated 4-games-to-1. A year later, the Merchants again won the OPJHL and this time the DHC too. They traveled off to the Royal Bank Cup 1998 in Nanaimo, British Columbia to compete for the National Junior A championship. They defeated the Central Junior A Hockey League's Brockville Braves 5–2, but lost to the host Nanaimo Clippers 6–2, SJHL's Weyburn Red Wings 6–2, and the South Surrey Eagles 3-0 and again in the semi-final 6–2.

The summer of 1998 would change the face of Junior A hockey. Already at 22 teams, the OPJHL was about to almost double in size.

=== Expansion years (1998–2008) ===
In 1998 came the exodus. The Metro Junior A Hockey League closed its doors after over half a century of action at the Junior A and B levels. The Bancroft Hawks (Quinte), Buffalo Lightning (Niagara), Caledon Canadians, Durham Huskies, Huntsville Wildcats, Markham Waxers, North York Rangers, Oshawa Legionaires, Pickering Panthers, Port Hope Buzzards, Shelburne Wolves, Syracuse Jr. Crunch, Thornhill Rattlers, Wellington Dukes, and Wexford Raiders all made the jump to the OPJHL. The only team not to come was the Pittsburgh Jr. Penguins, who were not interested in the extra travel. A season before, a sign that this might happen occurred when the 1997 Metro Champion Aurora Tigers defected prior to the 1997–98 season. This swelled the league from 22 to 37 teams. Also, for the first time in its history, the OPJHL had American hockey clubs: the Buffalo Lightning and Syracuse Jr. Crunch.

The first season for this super-league was won by the Bramalea Blues. The Blues also won the Dudley Hewitt Cup as Central Canadian Champions and travelled to Yorkton, Saskatchewan, to compete in the Royal Bank Cup 1999. Despite winning the round robin with a 3–1 record, the Blues were upset by the BCHL's Vernon Vipers, 3–2, in the semi-final. The 1999–2000 Buckland Cup champions were the Brampton Capitals, but they failed to win the Dudley Hewitt Cup, losing a best-of-7 series to the Rayside-Balfour Sabrecats.

The 2001 Buckland Cup champions were the Thornhill Rattlers. The Rattlers defeated Rayside-Balfour to win the Dudley Hewitt Cup and moved on to Flin Flon, Manitoba, for the Royal Bank Cup 2001. The Rattlers were unsuccessful in their venture, losing four straight games and not qualifying for the semi-finals.

In 2002, the Brampton Capitals once again were the Buckland Cup champions. After defeating the Wellington Dukes to win the OPJHL crown, the Caps failed to win the Dudley Hewitt Cup for a berth in the Royal Bank Cup. A year later, the Wellington Dukes rebounded their OPJHL final defeated from 2002 and won the 2003 Buckland Cup 4-games-to-2 over the Aurora Tigers. The Dukes ventured to Fort Frances, Ontario, for the Dudley Hewitt Cup. After defeating the SIJHL's Fort Frances Borderland Thunder 7–1, they lost to the NOJHL's North Bay Skyhawks 2–1. The Dukes came back and defeated the SIJHL's Thunder Bay Bulldogs 7–4 to earn a berth into the DHC semi-final. In the semi-final, they defeated the Borderland Thunder 4-2 and then defeated North Bay 4–0 in the final to win the Central Canadian crown. The Dukes then moved on to Charlottetown, Prince Edward Island, for the Royal Bank Cup 2003. The Dukes lost their first game 4–1 to the SJHL's Humboldt Broncos and lost again in their second game 7–1 to the AJHL's Camrose Kodiaks. It was do-or-die time for the Dukes, and they stepped up to the plate by defeating the host Charlottetown Abbies 1–0 in overtime and the QJAAAHL's Lennoxville Cougars 5–2 to gain access to the semi-final. The Dukes lost a tight 3–2 game to Humboldt in the semi-final to end their national championship hopes.

The 2003–04 Aurora Tigers achieved much in spring of 2004. After defeating St. Michael's Buzzers 4-games-to-2 to clinch the Buckland Cup and their fifth victorious best-of-7 series of the playoffs, the Tigers moved on to North Bay, Ontario, to compete for the Dudley Hewitt Cup. The Tigers swept the opposition, defeating the NOJHL's Soo Thunderbirds 3–1, the SIJHL's Fort William North Stars 4–0, and the host North Bay Skyhawks 5–3, then moved straight to the final and beat the Skyhawks again 5–1 to clinch the Central Canadian championship. The Tigers then flew out to Grande Prairie, Alberta, to compete in the Royal Bank Cup 2004. After losing their first game to the host Grande Prairie Storm 4–2, the Tiger went on a roll, beating the BCHL's Nanaimo Clippers 4–2, the SJHL's Kindersley Klippers 5–0, and the then Central Junior A Hockey League's Nepean Raiders 3–1. In the semi-final, the Tigers played the Raiders again and beat them 7–2, then manhandled the Klippers 7–1 in the final to win the Royal Bank Cup. This marked the first national championship in the OPJHL's 11-year history.

The 2005 Buckland Cup champions were St. Michael's Buzzers. After defeating the Georgetown Raiders 4-games-to-2 to win the OPJHL, they then travelled to Georgetown, Ontario, to compete for the Dudley Hewitt Cup. The Raiders went 3–0 in the tournament, defeating the NOJHL's North Bay Skyhawks 7–2, SIJHL's Fort William North Stars 4–0, and then St. Mike's 5–4. On top of St. Mike's loss to Georgetown, they lost to Fort William 6–4, but defeated North Bay 4–3 in quadruple overtime. In the semi-final, St. Mike's defeated Fort William 6–2, only to be defeated 3–1 in the final. Georgetown then travelled to Weyburn, Saskatchewan, to compete in the Royal Bank Cup 2005. They started out with a loss to the host Weyburn Red Wings, then beat the Central Junior A Hockey League's Hawkesbury Hawks 3–0. In their third game, they defeated the MJHL's Portage Terriers 6–3, but then lost to the AJHL's Camrose Kodiaks 2–1. They again drew Camrose in the semi-final and were walloped 8–2 to end their season.

In 2006, St. Michael's Buzzers won the Buckland Cup again by defeating the Stouffville Spirit 4-games-to-2. It seemed like the Buzzers were set to avenge their Dudley Hewitt Cup losses from the previous year, but it did not go as planned. In their first game, the Buzzers lost 3–2 to the SIJHL's Dryden Ice Dogs despite badly outshooting them. In the next game, the Buzzers found their form again and massacred the host Fort William North Stars 7–1, only to lose to the NOJHL's Sudbury Jr. Wolves 5–2. Due to tie-breaker, the Buzzers were eliminated from the round robin. The OPJHL still had a single hope left, the Streetsville Derbys were the hosts of the 2006 Royal Bank Cup in Brampton, Ontario. The Derbys finished first in the round robin, defeating the BCHL's Burnaby Express 4–3 in overtime, Fort William 3–2, the SJHL's Yorkton Terriers 2–1, before dropping a game to the QJAAAHL's Joliette Action 4–1. Unfortunately, the Derbys failed to win the semi-final against Yorkton, losing 2–1.

The 2006–07 season was dominated by the Aurora Tigers. After finishing first in the OPJHL regular season, the Tigers walked through five rounds of playoffs to win the Buckland Cup. They then travelled to Iroquois Falls, Ontario, for the Dudley Hewitt Cup. The Dudley proved to be little challenge for the Tigers, as they defeated the NOJHL's Soo Indians 4–1, the SIJHL's Schreiber Diesels 6–3, and the host Abitibi Eskimos 7–0, before crushing Schreiber 10–0 in the Central Championship final. Next, they travelled to Prince George, British Columbia, for the 2007 Royal Bank Cup. Aurora started off the national championship with a 4–2 victory over the MJHL's Selkirk Steelers. They then lost to the Central Junior A Hockey League's Pembroke Lumber Kings 5–3. The Tigers then beat the host Prince George Spruce Kings 6-3 and the AJHL's Camrose Kodiaks 7–4 to clinch first place in the round robin. In the semi-final, the Tiger ended up defeating the only team they lost to in the tournament, Pembroke, 3–2 in overtime. In the final, the Tigers defeated Prince George 3–1 to win their second national title in four years.

The 2008 league champions were the Oakville Blades, a team that had a great regular season and dominated the Buckland Cup playoffs. At the Dudley, the Blades were perfect, defeating the SIJHL's Dryden Ice Dogs 5–1, the NOJHL's Sudbury Jr. Wolves 5–3, and the host Newmarket Hurricanes 5–2. The other two games for Newmarket had them defeat Sudbury 5-1 and Dryden 7–1. In the semi-final, Newmarket defeated Dryden again 2-1 and in the final Oakville finished off Newmarket's season with a 6–3 victory. In the process, Oakville lost their star goaltender, mid-tournament, in order for him to maintain hist NCAA eligibility due to his age. This loss cost the Blades as they travelled to Cornwall, Ontario, for the 2008 Royal Bank Cup. The Blades lost their opener to the host Cornwall Colts 5–4. they then lost in overtime to the MJAHL's Weeks Crushers 4–3. They rebounded in their fourth game, defeating the SJHL's Humboldt Broncos 7–6, followed by a 6–1 loss to the AJHL's Camrose Kodiaks. With a 1–3 record, the Blades were eliminated from the tournament despite outshooting their opponent in all four games.

=== Dissolution and reformation (2008–2010) ===
Central Division Hockey logo

The summer of 2008 brought much change to the OPJHL. As approved by the OHA, the semi-autonomous Central Division Hockey pilot program began in 2008–09. This divisions creation was controversial and had been appealed by left out teams to the Ontario Hockey Federation. Although the OHA is attempted to play down the significance of the division in some aspects, they have admitted that the new conference would have slightly different rules than the rest of the divisions and that the CDH would be geared more for development. As well, the member teams would operate at a higher budget and completely partitioned from the rest of the OPJHL until the league semi-final. Additionally, the CDH would play a 53-game schedule, as opposed to the rest of the league which played a 49-game season. The division had its own website, separate from the league.

On September 19, 2008, the league, already a month into the 2008–09 season, announced a name change, a new logo, and a new website. The league will now be known as the Ontario Junior Hockey League. Prior to the start of the season, the three divisions not involved with Central Division Hockey were renamed. The West Division is now the MacKinnon Division, the North Division is now the Phillips Division, and the East Division is the Ruddock Division. The South Division is scattered between the Phillips and MacKinnon Divisions.

The 2008–09 season finished with the Couchiching Terriers taking the overall best record. The finish in the Central Division was quite unique. First and last place in the division was the least spread out of all four divisions, the top six of eight teams all had even or winning records, the Markham Waxers and Wellington Dukes race for first place lasted until the final game of the season, as did the race for third between the Hamilton Red Wings, Newmarket Hurricanes, and Toronto Jr. Canadiens. The Central Division playoffs was won by Wellington, but they were eliminated by the MacKinnon Division champion and defending league champion Oakville Blades in a controversial series that went to a seventh game. The Kingston Voyageurs won the Ruddock Division who beat the Phillips Division champion Huntsville Otters 4-games-to-1 to go to the Buckland Cup finals. Kingston would defeat Oakville 4-games-to-2 in the league final for the Buckland Cup. The Voyageurs moved on to the Dudley Hewitt Cup in Schreiber, Ontario where they started the tournament by beating the host Schreiber Diesels of the SIJHL 9–0. They then were upset by the SIJHL champion Fort William North Stars 1–0. In the third game, the Voyageurs defeated the NOJHL champion Soo Thunderbirds 2–0 to move on directly to the DHC Final. In the final, the Voyageurs defeated a fatigued and fresh off a slim semi-final victory North Stars 4–1 to win the Central Canada crown. They then flew out to Victoria, British Columbia for the 2009 Royal Bank Cup. The event was a learning experience for the Voyageurs who started off the event with a 5–0 loss to the host Victoria Grizzlies. In their next game, the Voyageurs edged the MJAHL's Summerside Western Capitals with a wild 7–5 win. They then lost to the SJHL's Humboldt Broncos 5–2 and then the BCHL's Vernon Vipers 8–5. Edging into the semi-finals via a head-to-head win over the Capitals, the Voyageurs lost their final game of the year 6–3 to the eventual national champion Vipers.

A new and thought to be final chapter in the OJHL saga opened in April 2009. Thirteen more teams left the core of the OJHL to join the Central Division, jumping the number of teams in the CDH to 21 and dropping the remainder of the OJHL to 15 for the 2009–10 season. On June 29, 2009, the OHA Board of Directors voted to separate the OJHL into two completely different leagues. The group of 15 teams will be known as the Ontario Junior A Hockey League, and the other 21 teams will be the Central Canadian Hockey League.

==== OJAHL ====

The first game in the new league's history was on September 9, 2009. The Bramalea Blues defeated the Mississauga Chargers 6–4 in Mississauga.

The Oakville Blades defeated the Kingston Voyageurs 4-games-to-3 in the OJAHL final to win their first and what will be the only OJAHL Championship.

The Oakville Blades then faced the CCHL's Newmarket Hurricanes for the 2010 Buckland Cup. The Hurricanes kept the series close, but the Blades took it in six games to move on to the Dudley Hewitt Cup.

==== CCHL ====

The first game under the CCHL banner was played September 9, 2009. The Streetsville Derbys defeated the North York Rangers 5–4 in a shootout in North York.

The West Division Champion Newmarket Hurricanes defeated the East Division Champion Bowmanville Eagles 4-games-to-2 in the CCHL final to win their first and what will be the only CCHL Championship.

=== Amalgamation (2010–present) ===
As the 2009–10 season wore on, the Ontario Hockey Association presented the Tomorrow's Game plan. An attempt to downsize the OHA's Jr. A and Jr. B teams from 63 teams of near equal calibre to about 12–16 teams of high calibre and the rest playing in a development division. The two leagues put aside their differences and appealed the move by the OHA to the Ontario Hockey Federation, who sided with the leagues.

From this point on, the two leagues have re-amalgamated for the 2010–11 season and have reduced the number of teams in competition by five, buying out or merging the Ajax Attack, Bowmanville Eagles, Bramalea Blues, Couchiching Terriers and Seguin Bruins. The trend continued in the summer of 2011, as the Streetsville Derbys merged to leave the league and the Collingwood Blackhawks, Dixie Beehives, and Orangeville Flyers all ceased operations. However, just over a week later, the Orangeville Flyers were reborn as the Villanova Knights filled in the void, and taken the identity of the Flyers.

The Huntsville Otters, Vaughan Vipers, and Brampton Capitals have all accepted buyouts from the league at the conclusion of the 2011–12 season. The Otters went as far as hosting the Dudley-Hewitt Cup, and playing in the final losing to the Wellington Dukes, while the Vipers were improving and being one of the top teams, and the Capitals went out of business.

As of the Summer of 2014, the OJHL has shrunk to 22 teams with only a handful outside of the Greater Toronto Area. Despite the retraction in league size and an increase in overall league talent, the league's teams have suffered at the gate and some teams have been forced to charge player fees.

Shortly after Hamilton being announced as a major junior market, the Hamilton Red Wings relocated to Markham, but were not allowed to return as the Markham Waxers and instead re-branded as the Markham Royals and will begin play in 2015–16.

=== Potential markets ===
Since 2009, the Ontario Junior Hockey League has retracted in size down to 22 teams as of 2015 after a series of buyouts from the league and mergers. The OJHL has been looking outside of the Greater Toronto Area, such as Huntsville, Parry Sound and even Belleville.

In late 2015, the OJHL announced a proposal to increase the league by two teams. The added teams are proposed to be advancement of Junior B teams and not from expansion. However, no teams were added.

March 2019, the OJHL announced the addition of the Collingwood Colts for the 2019–2020 season. Also for the 2019–20 season it was announced that the Newmarket Hurricanes had been sold and would be re-located to Milton and be rebranded the Milton Menace.

On May 18, 2023, the Leamington Flyers announced that they would be moving up from Junior B GOJHL to Junior A and joining the OJHL beginning in the 2023–24 season. On June 26, 2023, the Niagara Falls Canucks followed the Flyers and announced they will be moving up to Junior A joining the OJHL from the Jr B GOJHL for the 2023–24 season.

== Teams ==
East Conference
| Team | Centre | Joined |
| Aurora Tigers | Aurora, Ontario | 1997 |
| Cobourg Cougars | Cobourg, Ontario | 1992 |
| Haliburton County Huskies | Haliburton, Ontario | 1998 |
| Lindsay Muskies | Lindsay, Ontario | 1989 |
| Markham Royals | Markham, Ontario | 1993 |
| Newmarket Hurricanes | Newmarket, Ontario | 2025 |
| North York Rangers | Toronto, Ontario | 1998 |
| Pickering Panthers | Pickering, Ontario | 1998 |
| St. Michael's Buzzers | Toronto, Ontario | 1995 |
| Stouffville Spirit | Stouffville, Ontario | 1995 |
| Trenton Golden Hawks | Trenton, Ontario | 1998 |
| Wellington Dukes | Wellington, Ontario | 1998 |
West Conference
| Team | Centre | Joined |
| Buffalo Jr. Sabres | Buffalo, New York | 1971 |
| Burlington Cougars | Burlington, Ontario | 1971 |
| Caledon Admirals | Caledon, Ontario | 1998 |
| Collingwood Blues | Collingwood, Ontario | 1995 |
| Georgetown Raiders | Georgetown, Ontario | 1975 |
| King Rebellion | King Township, Ontario | 1971 |
| Leamington Flyers | Leamington, Ontario | 2023 |
| Milton Menace | Milton, Ontario | 1987 |
| Mississauga Chargers | Mississauga, Ontario | 1995 |
| Niagara Falls Canucks | Niagara Falls, Ontario | 2023 |
| Oakville Blades | Oakville, Ontario | 1971 |
| Toronto Patriots | Toronto, Ontario | 1998 |

Map of OJHL teams
West Division East Division

== Former teams ==
Former OJHL Teams
| Team | Centre | Joined | Exited | Status |
| Ajax Attack | Ajax, Ontario | 1991 | 2010 | Merged w/ Pickering Panthers |
| Barrie Colts | Barrie, Ontario | 1978 | 1995 | Joined OHL |
| Bowmanville Eagles | Bowmanville, Ontario | 1995 | 2010 | Merged w/ Cobourg Cougars |
| Bramalea Blues | Brampton, Ontario | 1995 | 2010 | Merged w/ Brampton Capitals |
| Brampton Capitals | Brampton, Ontario | 1984 | 2012 | Folded |
| Caledon Canadians | Caledon, Ontario | 1992; 1998 | 1993; 1999 | Folded |
| Collingwood Blues | Collingwood, Ontario | 1988 | 2011 | Folded |
| Couchiching Terriers | Rama, Ontario | 1978; 1987 | 1981; 2010 | Folded |
| Dixie Beehives | Toronto, Ontario | 2005 | 2011 | Folded |
| Durham Huskies | Durham, Ontario | 1998 | 2001 | Folded |
| Huntsville Otters | Huntsville, Ontario | 1998 | 2012 | Folded |
| Markham Waxers | Markham, Ontario | 1998 | 2012 | Folded |
| Orangeville Crushers | Orangeville, Ontario | 2006 | 2011 | Folded |
| Parry Sound Shamrocks | Parry Sound, Ontario | 1999 | 2002 | Folded |
| Peterborough Stars | Peterborough, Ontario | 1989 | 2012 | Merged w/ Lindsay Muskies |
| Seguin Bruins | Humphrey, Ontario | 2005 | 2010 | Folded |
| Shelburne Wolves | Shelburne, Ontario | 1998 | 1999 | Folded |
| Streetsville Derbys | Streetsville, Ontario | 1971 | 2011 | Merged w/ Cobourg Cougars |
| Syracuse Jr. Crunch | Syracuse, New York | 1998 | 2005 | Joined EJHL |
| Trenton Sting | Trenton, Ontario | 1995 | 2009 | Folded |
| Vaughan Vipers | Vaughan, Ontario | 1991 | 2012 | Folded |
| Brantford 99ers | Brantford, Ontario | 2018 | 2024 | Moved to King and became the King Rebellion |

=== CJBHL (Left before 1992) ===
- Acton Sabres
- Brampton Warriors Jr. B
- Dixie Beehives Jr. B
- Dundas Flyers
- Goderich Siftos
- Guelph Biltmores
- Guelph CMC's
- Hamilton Bees
- Ingersoll Marlands
- Kitchener Greenshirts
- Mimico Monarchs
- Nobleton Devils
- Oak Ridges Dynes
- Owen Sound Greys
- Paris Redshirts
- Preston Raiders
- St. Catharines Amthes
- St. Marys Lincolns
- Stratford Braves
- Strathroy Rockets
- Thornhill Thunderbirds
- Waterloo Siskins
- Woodstock Warriors

== Regular season champions ==
This is a list of divisional regular season champions and their point totals, bolded are the overall league regular season champions.

=== Junior A years ===
Please note: In 2009-10, there are two bolded league champions, this is due to a schism in the league that season.

| Year | East | Pts | West | Pts |
|---|---|---|---|---|
| 1992-93 | **Barrie Colts** | **95** | Brampton Capitals | 69 |
| 1993-94 | **Orillia Terriers** | **73** | Hamilton Kiltys | 66 |
| 1994-95 | **Newmarket 87's** | **75** | Milton Merchants | 69 |

| Year | MacKenzie | Pts | MacKinnon | Pts | Phillips | Pts | Ruddock | Pts |
|---|---|---|---|---|---|---|---|---|
| 1995-96 | Bramalea Blues | 77 | Milton Merchants | 64 | **Newmarket 87's** | **83** | Kingston Voyageurs | 82 |
| 1996-97 | Bramalea Blues | 76 | Milton Merchants | 81 | **Newmarket 87's** | **89** | Kingston Voyageurs | 87 |
| 1997-98 | Brampton Capitals | 83 | **Milton Merchants** | **85** | Collingwood Blues | 74 | Peterborough Bees | 62 |

| Year | East | Pts | Central | Pts | West | Pts |
|---|---|---|---|---|---|---|
| 1998-99 | Pickering Panthers | 74 | Collingwood Blues | 84 | **Milton Merchants** | **90** |

| Year | East | Pts | North | Pts | South | Pts | West | Pts |
|---|---|---|---|---|---|---|---|---|
| 1999-00 | **Lindsay Muskies** | **87** | Newmarket Hurricanes | 76 | Vaughan Vipers | 78 | Georgetown Raiders | 71 |
| 2000-01 | Lindsay Muskies | 74 | **Couchiching Terriers** | **79** | Thornhill Rattlers | 77 | Milton Merchants | 64 |
| 2001-02 | **Wellington Dukes** | **81** | Newmarket Hurricanes | 72 | Wexford Raiders | 76 | Brampton Capitals | 71 |
| 2002-03 | **Wellington Dukes** | **95** | Aurora Tigers | 89 | Wexford Raiders | 69 | Milton Merchants | 84 |
| 2003-04 | Wellington Dukes | 81 | **Aurora Tigers** | **94** | St. Michael's Buzzers | 69 | Georgetown Raiders | 84 |
| 2004-05 | Port Hope Predators | 82 | Aurora Tigers | 69 | Wexford Raiders | 81 | **Georgetown Raiders** | **83** |
| 2005-06 | Bowmanville Eagles | 83 | Aurora Tigers | 76 | St. Michael's Buzzers | 66 | **Milton Icehawks** | **87** |
| 2006-07 | Bowmanville Eagles | 82 | **Aurora Tigers** | **89** | Vaughan Vipers | 74 | Brampton Capitals | 81 |
| 2007-08 | Wellington Dukes | 72 | Huntsville Otters | 84 | **St. Michael's Buzzers** | **88** | Oakville Blades | 82 |

| Year | Central | Pts | MacKinnon | Pts | Phillips | Pts | Ruddock | Pts |
|---|---|---|---|---|---|---|---|---|
| 2008-09 | Wellington Dukes | 75 | Georgetown Raiders | 85 | **Couchiching Terriers** | **85** | Kingston Voyageurs | 76 |

| Year | CCHL East | Pts | CCHL West | Pts | OJAHL | Pts |
|---|---|---|---|---|---|---|
| 2009-10 | Bowmanville Eagles | 69 | **Burlington Cougars** | **81** | **Kingston Voyageurs** | **97** |

| Year | East | Pts | North | Pts | South | Pts | West | Pts |
|---|---|---|---|---|---|---|---|---|
| 2010-11 | Wellington Dukes | 81 | **Newmarket Hurricanes** | **83** | Vaughan Vipers | 71 | Burlington Cougars | 80 |
| 2011-12 | Trenton Golden Hawks | 78 | Newmarket Hurricanes | 79 | St. Michael's Buzzers | 78 | **Georgetown Raiders** | **79** |
| 2012-13 | **Trenton Golden Hawks** | **85** | Aurora Tigers | 70 | St. Michael's Buzzers | 77 | Buffalo Jr. Sabres | 81 |
| 2013-14 | **Kingston Voyageurs** | **81** | Aurora Tigers | 79 | Toronto Lakeshore Patriots | 76 | Buffalo Jr. Sabres | 68 |
| 2014-15 | Trenton Golden Hawks | 85 | **Aurora Tigers** | **91** | Toronto Patriots | 71 | Georgetown Raiders | 82 |
| 2015-16 | **Trenton Golden Hawks** | **92** | Markham Royals | 68 | Oakville Blades | 71 | Georgetown Raiders | 78 |
| 2016-17 | Trenton Golden Hawks | 87 | Markham Royals | 64 | Oakville Blades | 73 | **Georgetown Raiders** | **94** |
| 2017-18 | Wellington Dukes | 74 | Aurora Tigers | 78 | **Toronto Patriots** | **86** | Georgetown Raiders | 78 |
| 2018-19 | Cobourg Cougars | 78 | Markham Royals | 65 | North York Rangers | 85 | **Oakville Blades** | **94** |
| 2019–20 | **Wellington Dukes** | **88** | Pickering Panthers | 68 | Toronto Jr. Canadiens | 82 | Oakville Blades | 84 |
| 2021-22 | Welington Dukes | 75 | Pickering Panthers | 82 | Toronto Jr. Canadiens | 83 | Burlington Cougars | 81 |

== Champions ==
=== OJHL Champions ===
From 1998 until 2009, the league champion has been awarded the Frank L. Buckland Trophy. From 1994 until 1998 the OPJHL competed against the Metro Junior A Hockey League and/or Northern Ontario Junior Hockey League for the Buckland Cup, losing in 1994 and 1997 but winning 1995, 1996 and 1998. The Buckland Cup was never technically the championship trophy of the OJHL, it was the championship of the Ontario Hockey Association and in 1998-99 the OPJHL became the only Jr. A league in the OHA.

Frank L. Buckland Trophy:
OHA Jr. A Championship

William T. Ruddock Trophy:
OHF Championship, competed for by OPJHL champions since 1994

Dudley Hewitt Cup:
Regional Championship, competed for by OPJHL champions since 1994

The chart below shows all divisional playoff champions since the inception of the league in 1992. Bolded are the overall playoff champions, Italicized are the runner-up and fellow conference champion.

| **Year** | **West** | | **East** |
| 1993 | Brampton Capitals | | **Barrie Colts** |
| 1994 | Hamilton Kiltys | | **Orillia Terriers** |
| 1995 | **Brampton Capitals** | | Barrie Colts |
| | **Phillips** | **MacKinnon** | **MacKenzie** | **Ruddock** |
| 1996 | **Newmarket 87's** | Milton Merchants | Brampton Capitals | Kingston Voyageurs |
| 1997 | Newmarket 87's | **Milton Merchants** | Bramalea Blues | Kingston Voyageurs |
| 1998 | Newmarket Hurricanes | **Milton Merchants** | Bramalea Blues | Trenton Sting |
| | **Central** | **West** | **Wildcard** | **East** |
| 1999 | Collingwood Blues | **Bramalea Blues** | Milton Merchants | Pickering Panthers |
| | **North** | **West** | **South** | **East** |
| 2000 | Couchiching Terriers | **Brampton Capitals** | Thornhill Rattlers | Lindsay Muskies |
| 2001 | Couchiching Terriers | Milton Merchants | **Thornhill Rattlers** | Trenton Sting |
| 2002 | Aurora Tigers | **Brampton Capitals** | Wexford Raiders | Wellington Dukes |
| 2003 | Aurora Tigers | Georgetown Raiders | Markham Waxers | **Wellington Dukes** |
| 2004 | **Aurora Tigers** | Oakville Blades | St. Michael's Buzzers | Bowmanville Eagles |
| 2005 | Aurora Tigers | Georgetown Raiders | **St. Michael's Buzzers** | Port Hope Predators |
| 2006 | Stouffville Spirit | Oakville Blades | **St. Michael's Buzzers** | Bowmanville Eagles |
| 2007 | **Aurora Tigers** | Hamilton Red Wings | St. Michael's Buzzers | Wellington Dukes |
| 2008 | Aurora Tigers | **Oakville Blades** | Markham Waxers | Wellington Dukes |
| | **Phillips** | **MacKinnon** | **Central** | **Ruddock** |
| 2009 | Huntsville Otters | Oakville Blades | Wellington Dukes | **Kingston Voyageurs** |
| | **CCHL Champions** | **CCHL Finalists** | **OJAHL Champions** | **OJAHL Finalists** |
| 2010; CC/OJ | Newmarket Hurricanes | Bowmanville Eagles | **Oakville Blades** | Kingston Voyageurs |
| | **Northwest** | | **Southeast** |
| 2011 | Oakville Blades | | **Wellington Dukes** |
| | **North** | **West** | **South** | **East** |
| 2012 | **Stouffville Spirit** | Georgetown Raiders | Toronto Lakeshore Patriots | Whitby Fury |
| | **Northeast** | | **Southwest** |
| 2013 | Newmarket Hurricanes | | **St. Michael's Buzzers** |
| 2014 | Aurora Tigers | | **Toronto Lakeshore Patriots** |
| 2015 | Kingston Voyageurs | | **Toronto Patriots** |
| 2016 | **Trenton Golden Hawks** | | Georgetown Raiders |
| 2017 | Trenton Golden Hawks | | **Georgetown Raiders** |
| 2018 | **Wellington Dukes** | | Georgetown Raiders |
| | **North** | **West** | **South** | **East** |
| 2019 | Markham Royals | **Oakville Blades** | North York Rangers | Wellington Dukes |
| 2020 | Cancelled due to COVID-19 pandemic |
| 2021 | Cancelled due to COVID-19 pandemic |
| 2022 | **Pickering Panthers** | Milton Menace | Toronto Jr. Canadiens | Cobourg Cougars |
| 2023 | **Collingwood Blues** | | Trenton Golden Hawks |
| 2024 | **Collingwood Blues** | | Trenton Golden Hawks |
| 2025 | **Trenton Golden Hawks** | | Milton Menace |

=== Dudley Hewitt Cup Central Canadian Champions ===
| **Year** | **Champion** | **Finalist** | **Host (if applicable)** |
|---|---|---|---|
| 1996 | Newmarket 87's | Brampton Capitals | Cobourg, Ontario |
| 1998 | Milton Merchants | Rayside-Balfour Sabrecats (NOJHL) | — |
| 1999 | Bramalea Blues | Rayside-Balfour Sabrecats (NOJHL) | — |
| 2001 | Thornhill Rattlers | Rayside-Balfour Sabrecats (NOJHL) | — |
| 2003 | Wellington Dukes | North Bay Skyhawks (NOJHL) | Fort Frances, Ontario |
| 2004 | Aurora Tigers | North Bay Skyhawks (NOJHL) | North Bay, Ontario |
| 2005 | Georgetown Raiders | St. Michael's Buzzers | Georgetown, Ontario |
| 2007 | Aurora Tigers | Schreiber Diesels (SIJHL) | Iroquois Falls, Ontario |
| 2008 | Oakville Blades | Newmarket Hurricanes | Newmarket, Ontario |
| 2009 | Kingston Voyageurs | Fort William North Stars (SIJHL) | Schreiber, Ontario |
| 2010 | Oakville Blades | Fort William North Stars (SIJHL) | Sault Ste. Marie, Ontario |
| 2011 | Wellington Dukes | Huntsville Otters | Huntsville, Ontario |
| 2014 | Toronto Lakeshore Patriots | Wellington Dukes | Wellington, Ontario |
| 2016 | Trenton Golden Hawks | Soo Thunderbirds (NOJHL) | Kirkland Lake, Ontario |
| 2017 | Trenton Golden Hawks | Georgetown Raiders | Trenton, Ontario |
| 2018 | Wellington Dukes | Dryden Ice Dogs (SIJHL) | Dryden, Ontario |
| 2019 | Oakville Blades | Hearst Lumberjacks (NOJHL) | Cochrane, Ontario |

=== Junior A National Champions ===
| **Year** | **Champion** | **Finalist** | **Host (if applicable)** |
|---|---|---|---|
| 2004 | **Aurora Tigers** | Kindersley Klippers (SJHL) | Grande Prairie, Alberta |
| 2007 | **Aurora Tigers** | Prince George Spruce Kings (BCHL) | Prince George, BC |
| 2017 | **Cobourg Cougars** | Brooks Bandits (AJHL) | Cobourg, ON |
| 2024 | **Collingwood Blues** | Melfort Mustangs (SJHL) | Oakville, ON |

=== Central League Jr. B Champions ===
The league champions are bolded.

| **Year** | **Champion** | **Finalist** |
|---|---|---|
| 1955 | Woodstock Warriors | Burlington Industrials |
| 1956 | Waterloo Siskins | Burlington Industrials |
| 1957 | Burlington Industrials | Owen Sound Greys |
| 1958 | Burlington Industrials | Owen Sound Greys |
| 1959 | Waterloo Siskins | Owen Sound Greys |
| 1960 | Waterloo Siskins | Owen Sound Greys |
| 1961 | Owen Sound Greys | Waterloo Siskins |
| 1962 | Waterloo Siskins | Kitchener Greenshirts |
| 1963 | Waterloo Siskins | Kitchener Greenshirts |
| 1964 | Waterloo Siskins | Stratford Braves |
| 1965 | Kitchener Greenshirts | Waterloo Siskins |
| 1966 | Kitchener Greenshirts | Goderich Siftos |
| 1967 | Kitchener Greenshirts | Waterloo Siskins |
| 1968 | Kitchener Greenshirts | Goderich Siftos |
| 1969 | Strathroy Rockets | Kitchener Greenshirts |
| 1970 | Collingwood Blues | Guelph CMC's |
| 1971 | Collingwood Blues | Owen Sound Greys |
| 1972 | Hespeler Shamrocks | Burlington Mohawks |
| 1973 | Burlington Mohawks |
| 1974 | Oakville Blades |

| **Year** | **Champion** | **Finalist** |
|---|---|---|
| 1975 | **Oakville Blades** | Burlington Mohawks |
| 1976 | **Streetsville Derbys** | Brampton Logan Chevys |
| 1977 | **Streetsville Derbys** | Milton Flyers |
| 1978 | **Streetsville Derbys** | Milton Flyers |
| 1979 | **Streetsville Derbys** | Oakville Blades |
| 1980 | **Streetsville Derbys** | Burlington Cougars |
| 1981 | **Burlington Cougars** | Oakville Blades |
| 1982 | **Oakville Blades** | Streetsville Derbys |
| 1983 | **Streetsville Derbys** | Georgetown Gemini |
| 1984 | **Streetsville Derbys** | Oakville Blades |
| 1985 | **Barrie Colts** | Streetsville Derbys |
| 1986 | **Streetsville Derbys** | Barrie Colts |
| 1987 | **Burlington Cougars** | Barrie Colts |
| | **East** | **West** |
| 1988 | **Barrie Colts** | Burlington Cougars |
| 1989 | **Barrie Colts** | Etobicoke Capitals |
| 1990 | **Barrie Colts** | Oakville Blades |
| 1991 | Orillia Terriers | **Oakville Blades** |
| 1992 | Aurora Eagles | **Milton Merchants** |

=== Sutherland Cup Provincial Jr. B Champions ===
| **Year** | **Champion** | **Finalist** |
|---|---|---|
| 1955 | Woodstock Warriors | Woodbridge Dodgers (MetJHL) |
| 1956 | Waterloo Siskins | Brampton Regents (MetJHL) |
| 1960 | Waterloo Siskins | Toronto Marlboros (MetJHL) |
| 1962 | Waterloo Siskins | St. Thomas Barons (WOJBHL) |
| 1964 | Waterloo Siskins | Weston Dodgers (MetJHL) |
| 1965 | Kitchener Greenshirts | Etobicoke Indians (MetJHL) |
| 1967 | Kitchener Greenshirts | Dixie Beehives (MetJHL) |
| 1979 | Streetsville Derbys | St. Catharines Falcons (GHJHL) |
| 1981 | Burlington Cougars | Stratford Cullitons (MWJHL) |
| 1993 | Barrie Colts | Kitchener Dutchmen (MWJHL) |

OPJHL Champions are listed on the league's official website. The CJBHL champions were provided by the league's statistician and the Toronto Star.

== OPJHL Showcase Tournament ==
The OPJHL Showcase Tournament was an annual event ran between Christmas and New Years in Newmarket, Ontario, hosted by the Newmarket Hurricanes. The tournament started in 1992 to help aid Canadian Hockey League, National Hockey League, and National Collegiate Athletic Association scouts in finding prospects for their teams. The tournament was highly competitive and successful. It drew as many as twenty junior hockey teams from all over North America. Despite just being a mid-season tourney, the event was highly contested and its title is played for with much ferocity.

In 2007, the tournament was canceled as Newmarket wanted to focus their attention on hosting the Dudley Hewitt Cup that year. In 2008, the tournament was turned strictly into a 2-game a team showcase for teams from Central Division Hockey, killing the tournament format.

=== Champions ===
- 2006 Georgetown Raiders
- 2005 Vaughan Vipers
- 2004 Texas Tornado
- 2003 Texas Tornado
- 2002 Texas Tornado
- 2001 Brampton Capitals
- 2000 Hamilton Kilty B's
- 1999 Vaughan Vipers
- 1998 Milton Merchants
- 1997 Milton Merchants
- 1996 Brampton Capitals
- 1995 Milton Merchants
- 1994 Newmarket 87's
- 1993 Hamilton Kilty B's
- 1992 Markham Waxers

== League records ==
=== Scoring ===
| Year | Champion | Team | G-A-P |
|---|---|---|---|
| 1992-93 | Steve Walker | Barrie Colts | 75-76-151 |
| 1993-94 | Ron Watts | Brampton Capitals | 54-55-109 |
| 1994-95 | Jamie Janjevich | Milton Merchants | 33-94-127 |
| 1995-96 | Trent Walford | Newmarket 87's | 52-90-142 |
| 1996-97 | Ryan Vince | Kingston Voyageurs | 54-81-135 |
| 1997-98 | Darren Haydar | Milton Merchants | 71-69-140 |
| 1998-99 | Stace Page | Georgetown Raiders | 54-69-123 |
| 1999-00 | Pierre Rivard | Newmarket Hurricanes | 35-77-112 |
| 2000-01 | Jason Pinizzotto | Couchiching Terriers | 54-86-140 |
| 2001-02 | Jeff Hristovski | Brampton Capitals | 56-47-103 |
| 2002-03 | Josh Soars | Hamilton Kiltys | 56-68-124 |
| 2003-04 | Ben Cottreau | Markham Waxers | 43-52-95 |
| 2004-05 | Andrew Cogliano | St. Michael's Buzzers | 36-66-102 |
| 2005-06 | Mark Prentice | Port Hope Predators | 56-44-100 |
| 2006-07 | Scott Freeman | Bowmanville Eagles | 33-64-97 |
| 2007-08 | Bruce Crawford | Mississauga Chargers | 41-57-98 |
| 2008-09 | Nathan Pageau | Hamilton Red Wings | 48-55-103 |
| 2009-10 | Josh Jooris; Matt Smyth | Burlington Cougars (CC); Couchiching Terriers (OJ) | 26-90-116; 51-55-106 |
| 2010-11 | Phil Prewer | Burlington Cougars | 39-70-109 |
| 2011-12 | Christian Finch | Stouffville Spirit | 37-67-104 |
| 2012-13 | Tyler Gjurich | Buffalo Jr. Sabres | 53-44-97 |
| 2013-14 | Taylor Best | Whitby Fury | 37-53-90 |
| 2014-15 | Steve Hladin | Georgetown Raiders | 41-63-104 |
| 2015-16 | Luc Brown | Wellington Dukes | 42-49-91 |
| 2016-17 | Jack Jacome | Georgetown Raiders | 34-57-91 |
| 2017-18 | Andrew Petrucci | Toronto Patriots | 52-48-100 |
| 2018-19 | Alessio Luciani | Markham Royals | 31-45-76 |

=== Records (Junior A) ===
- Best record: 1992-93 Barrie Colts (47-0-1)
- Worst record**: 1993-94 Royal York Rangers (1-40-1)
- Most goals, one season: Steve Walker (75) -- 1992-93 Barrie Colts
- Most assists, one season: Jamie Janjevich (94) -- 1994-95 Milton Merchants
- Most points, one season: Steve Walker (151) -- 1992-93 Barrie Colts

(**) denotes that the record is held only by a team that completed their season. The 2003-04 Huntsville Wildcats are one of only two teams in OPJHL history to have folded mid-season. They folded with record of 0-23-0-0 and hold the record for worst winning percentage of all-time.

== Timeline of teams in OJHL ==
- 1992 - Central Junior B Hockey League is elected to become pilot project for planned Junior A league
- 1992 - Cobourg Cougars join league from Central Ontario Junior C Hockey League
- 1992 - Aurora Eagles leave league for Metro Junior A Hockey League
- 1992 - Streetsville Derbys move and become Mississauga Derbys
- 1993 - League changes name from Central Junior A Hockey League to Ontario Provincial Junior A Hockey League
- 1993 - Hamilton Kiltys join league from Golden Horseshoe Junior Hockey League
- 1993 - Caledon Canadians leave league for Metro Junior A Hockey League
- 1993 - Mississauga Derbys move and become Streetsville Derbys
- 1994 - Lindsay Bears become the Lindsay Muskies
- 1995 - Barrie Colts leave league for Ontario Hockey League
- 1995 - Markham Waxers leave league for Metro Junior A Hockey League
- 1995 - Bramalea Blues, St. Michael's Buzzers, Mississauga Chargers, and Kingston Voyageurs join league from Metro Junior A Hockey League
- 1995 - Stouffville Clippers join league
- 1995 - Trenton Sting and Bowmanville Eagles join league from Central Ontario Junior C Hockey League
- 1996 - Royal York Royals become the Vaughan Vipers
- 1996 - Stouffville Clippers become the Stouffville Spirit
- 1997 - Aurora Tigers join league from Metro Junior A Hockey League
- 1997 - Orillia Terriers move and become Couchiching Terriers
- 1997 - Newmarket 87's become Newmarket Hurricanes
- 1997 - Peterborough Jr. Petes become Peterborough Bees
- 1997 - St. Michael's Buzzers take leave of absence
- 1998 - League absorbs folded Metro Junior A Hockey League; new teams due to merger: Auburn Jr. Crunch (Syracuse Jr. Crunch), Bancroft Hawks (Quinte Hawks), Buffalo Lightning (Niagara Scenic), Caledon Canadians, Durham Huskies, Huntsville Wildcats, Markham Waxers, North York Rangers, Oshawa Legionaires, Pickering Panthers, Port Hope Buzzards, Shelburne Wolves, Thornhill Rattlers, Wellington Dukes, and Wexford Raiders.
- 1999 - Auburn Jr. Crunch change name to Syracuse Jr. Crunch
- 1999 - Shelburne Wolves leave league
- 1999 - Caledon Canadians leave league
- 1999 - Parry Sound Shamrocks join league from Northern Ontario Junior Hockey League
- 1999 - St. Michael's Buzzers rejoin league
- 2000 - Port Hope Buzzards become the Port Hope Clippers
- 2001 - Durham Huskies leave league
- 2001 - Port Hope Clippers are renamed Port Hope Predators
- 2002 - Parry Sound Shamrocks leave league
- 2002 - Hamilton Kiltys change name to Hamilton Red Wings
- 2003 - Huntsville Wildcats fold mid-season
- 2003 - Peterborough Bees change name to Peterborough Stars
- 2003 - Milton Merchants change name to Milton Icehawks
- 2004 - Huntsville Wildcats are reformed and changed their name to Huntsville-Muskoka Otters
- 2004 - Thornhill Rattlers change name to Thornhill Thunderbirds
- 2005 - Thornhill Thunderbirds become Toronto Thunderbirds
- 2005 - Buffalo Lightning become Buffalo Jr. Sabres
- 2005 - Ajax Axemen become Ajax Attack
- 2005 - Seguin Bruins join the league
- 2005 - Oswego Admirals join the league
- 2005 - Syracuse Jr. Crunch leave the league for Eastern Junior Hockey League
- 2006 - Wexford Raiders become Toronto Jr. Canadiens
- 2006 - Oshawa Legionaires become Durham Fury
- 2006 - Couchiching Terriers take leave
- 2006 - Toronto Thunderbirds take leave
- 2006 - Orangeville Crushers join league from Mid-Western Junior Hockey League
- 2007 - Couchiching Terriers return to league
- 2007 - Oswego Admirals move and become Toronto Dixie Beehives
- 2007 - Trenton Sting become Quinte West Pack
- 2007 - Toronto Thunderbirds return as Villanova Knights
- 2007 - Bancroft Hawks take leave
- 2007 - Bramalea Blues take leave
- 2008 - Ontario Provincial Junior A Hockey League is renamed Ontario Junior Hockey League
- 2008 - Quinte West Pack become Trenton Hercs
- 2008 - Bramalea Blues return to league
- 2008 - Bancroft Hawks return as Upper Canada Hockey Club
- 2008 - Durham Fury move and become Whitby Fury
- 2009 - Trenton Hercs fold mid-season (January)
- 2009 - Ontario Junior Hockey League temporarily divides into Central Canadian Hockey League and Ontario Junior A Hockey League (by the 2010 Dudley Hewitt Cup, the schism is mended and the Oakville Blades represent both leagues as the OJHL Champions)
- 2009 - Port Hope Predators move and become Trenton Golden Hawks
- 2009 - Toronto Dixie Beehives move and become Dixie Beehives
- 2009 - Upper Canada Hockey Club move and become Upper Canada Patriots
- 2010 - Bramalea Blues, Couchiching Terriers, and Seguin Bruins cease operations
- 2010 - Ajax Attack fold and merge into Pickering Panthers
- 2010 - Bowmanville Eagles fold and merge into Cobourg Cougars
- 2010 - Collingwood Blues change name to Collingwood Blackhawks
- 2010 - Orangeville Crushers change name to Orangeville Flyers
- 2011 - Upper Canada Patriots change name to Toronto Lakeshore Patriots
- 2011 - Streetsville Derbys fold and merge into Cobourg Cougars
- 2011 - Dixie Beehives cease operations
- 2011 - Collingwood Blackhawks cease operations
- 2011 - Orangeville Flyers cease operations
- 2011 - Villanova Knights move and become Orangeville Flyers
- 2012 - Huntsville Otters jump to Georgian Mid-Ontario Junior C Hockey League
- 2012 - Brampton Capitals cease operations
- 2012 - Vaughan Vipers cease operations
- 2012 - Peterborough Stars fold and merge into Lindsay Muskies
- 2013 - Markham Waxers membership terminated by league
- 2014 - Toronto Lakeshore Patriots change name to Toronto Patriots
- 2015 - Hamilton Red Wings move and become Markham Royals
- 2019 - Kingston Voyageurs sold and move to Collingwood to become Collingwood Colts
- 2020 - Collingwood Colts change name to Collingwood Blues
- 2023 - Leamington Flyers join the league
- 2023 - Niagara Falls Canucks join the league
- 2024 - Brantford 99s become the King Rebellion
- 2025 - Toronto Jr. Canadiens become the Newmarket Hurricanes

== See also ==
- Ontario Hockey Association
- Hockey Canada
- Canadian Junior A Hockey League
- Metro Junior A Hockey League
- Southern Ontario Junior A Hockey League
- Dudley Hewitt Cup
- 2024 Centennial Cup
