= Colton Smith =

Colton Smith may refer to:

- Colton Smith (fighter) (born 1987), American mixed martial artist
- Colton Smith (tennis) (born 2003), American tennis player
