= Milton Menace =

- City: Milton, Ontario
- League: Ontario Junior Hockey League
- Conference: North-West conference
- Division: West
- Founded: 2019
- Home arena: Milton Memorial Arena
- Colours: Black, grey, white, copper
- Owner: Jason Tryfon
- General manager: Daniel Del Monte
- Head coach: Daniel Del Monte
- Affiliates: Georgina Ice (COJCHL)
- Website: www.miltonmenace.com

Franchise history
- 1972-1975: Seneca Flyers
- 1975-1986: Newmarket Flyers
- 1987-1997: Newmarket 87's
- 1997-2019: Newmarket Hurricanes
- 2019-Present: Milton Menace

Current uniform

The Milton Menace are a Junior "A" ice hockey team from Milton, Ontario. They play in the North-West Conference of the Ontario Junior Hockey League. In March 2019, the OJHL announced Jason Tryfon's purchase of the Newmarket Hurricanes franchise and its move to Milton.

== Season-by-season results ==
Season	GP	W	L	T	OTL	GF	GA	P	Results	Playoffs
Milton Menace
2019-20	54	17	28	4	5	157	219	43	6th of 6 West Div; 4th of 11 NW Conf; 18th of 22 OJHL	Did not Qualify for Playoffs
2020-21	SEASON CANCELLED (COVID-19)									
2021-22	54	36	11	1	6	213	149	79	2nd of 5 West Div; 3rd of 10 NW Conf; 5th of 21 OJHL	Won NWConf Quarters 2-0 (Georgetown Raiders} Won NWConf Semifinals 2-0 (Burlington Cougars); Lost NWConf Finals 0-3 (Pickering Panthers)
2022-23	54	31	19	2	2	191	159	66	5th of 10 NW Conf; 10th of 21 OJHL	Won NWConf Quarters 4-1 (Pickering Panthers} Lost NWConf Semifinals 0-4 (Collingwood Blues)
2023-24	56	41	12	2	1	242	152	85	2nd of 12 West Conf; 3rd of 24 OJHL	Won WConf Quarters 4-1 (Burlington Cougars} Lost NWConf Semifinals 1-4 (Leamington Flyers)
2024-25	56	36	14	1	4	229	148	77	3rd of 12 West Conf; 6th of 24 OJHL	Won Conf Quarters 4-0 (Burlington Cougars} Won Conf Semifinals 4-1 (Collingwood Blues (2020)); Won Conf Finals 4-1 (Leamington Flyers); Lost League Finals 2-4 (Golden Hawks)
