= Brantford 99ers =

- City: Brantford, Ontario, Canada
- League: Ontario Junior Hockey League
- Division: West
- Founded: 1966
- Home arena: Wayne Gretzky Sports Centre
- Colours: Red, black, white
- General manager: Willa Wang
- Head coach: Mark Joslin
- Website: https://brantford99ers.ojhl.ca/

Franchise history
- 1966–1971: Milton Merchants
- 1971–1983: Milton Flyers
- 1983–1986: Milton Steamers
- 1986–2003: Milton Merchants
- 2003–2018: Milton Icehawks
- 2018–2024: Brantford 99ers
- 2024–present: King Rebellion

Championships
- Playoff championships: Buckland Trophy: 2 (1997, 1998); Dudley Hewitt Cup: 1 (1998)

The Brantford 99ers were a Junior A ice hockey team in the Ontario Junior Hockey League based in Brantford, Ontario. The 99ers have previously been known as the Milton Icehawks, Milton Merchants, Milton Flyers, and Milton Steamers as Milton hosted junior hockey from 1966 to 2018. After purchasing the team, Darren DeDobbelaer of Brantford moved the club to that city for the start of the 2018-19 season, re-branding the team as the 99ers. In 2023, DeDobbelaer sold the team. The team relocated to King, Ontario and became the King Rebellion in the 2024–25 OJHL season.

Brantford 99ers logo

== History ==
The Icehawks were one of the most historical teams in the Ontario Junior Hockey League, having been formed in 1964 until the team was purchased and moved to Brantford for the 2018-19 season. The Icehawks (2003–2018) have previously been known as the Milton Flyers (1971-1983), Milton Steamers (1983-1986), and Milton Merchants (1966-1971, 1986-2003).

=== Early years ===
After serving in the Second World War as a RCAF wireless air gunner, David Brush returned to Milton and managed the Fred Armstrong Arena on Brown Street for two years, before Milton had artificial ice. His dedication to hockey included coaching at the minor league level and founding the town’s first Junior C club, the Milton Merchants, in 1964 as co-owner and president, which later became Jr. B and eventually Jr. A. For his efforts Brush was inducted into the Milton Sports Hall of Fame in 2018.

In the 1970s, Vern Gooding owned the local team when they were known as the Milton Flyers.

In 1974, three players including the team captain and top scorer left the team mid season over an imposed curfew dispute. Two of the three players had had tryouts with OHL clubs, and all three were club veterans.

Grant Turner, Mark Grenier, Howie Scannell, and John Morgan owned the Milton Steamers in the early 1980s. Morgan sold his stake in the club to Turner, prompting Scannell to announce that he was preparing to sell his stake as well. On April 10, 1986, Turner, Grenier and Scannell sold the Steamers to Brad Grant who owned trucking company Sandstone Transport.

=== Grant era and championship successes ===
Trucking magnate Brad Grant purchased the team in April 1986 when it seemed like the organization might fold. For the 1986-87 season, he immediately changed the team's name from the Steamers to the Merchants after the Junior C team of old, and brought in former coach Gerry Inglis, who had also coached the Georgetown Raiders and had won five intermediate championships at the time.

Grant led the team to tremendous success in the late 1990s. During his 15-year ownership run, the team captured four division crowns, three league championships and a provincial title.

In 1992, the Milton Merchants were Central Junior B Hockey League champions with a 4-2 victory in Game 7 over the Aurora Eagles. They made the Ontario Hockey Association Sutherland Cup Junior B championship but lost in five games to the Mid-Western Junior B Hockey League's Kitchener Dutchmen.

Following the 1992-93 season, the Merchants made the jump to Junior A in the OPJHL.

The 1994-95 season marked the beginning of a historical run for the franchise as the club won five straight division titles. The surge of success increased when the Merchants were crowned league champions in 1997, winning the Buckland Trophy after defeating the Newmarket 87's. In the 1997 Dudley Cup playoffs, the Rayside-Balfour Sabrecats (NOJHL) beat Milton four games to one.

In 1998, the Milton Merchants repeated their Buckland Trophy title, dispatching the Newmarket Hurricanes this time, and then went on to become Central Canadian Junior A Champions by winning the Dudley Hewitt Cup, defeating the Rayside-Balfour Sabrecats (NOJHL) four games to two, and exacting revenge for the previous year's loss to Rayside-Balfour.

At the 1998 Royal Bank Cup, the Milton Merchants went 1-3 in round robin play. In the semifinal game, Milton lost 6-2 to the South Surrey Eagles and were eliminated from the tournament.

In 2018, the Milton Sports Hall of Fame announced that it is inducting the 1996–97 and 1997-98 Merchants teams, and Brad Grant as a builder, during a ceremony in November.

=== Forgione era ===
In 2001, Grant sold the team to an Oakville trio that consisted of ex-NHLer Dave Gagner, Mario Forgione who owned the Mississauga IceDogs at the time and was an automotive parts manufacturing president, and wine distillery consultant Ken Chase.

For the 2003-04 season, Forgione changed the team's name from the Merchants to the IceHawks to reflect the team's connection with the local minor hockey programs called the Winterhawks, and Forgione's ownership of the Mississauga IceDogs. In 2005, the Ontario Hockey Association fined the Icehawks $12,000 and suspended then-General Manager George Dupont for signing two players outside of OHA guidelines. In 2006, Forgione officially affiliated the Icehawks with the IceDogs.

=== Heinz era ===
In the spring of 2006, ex-NHL goaltender Rick Heinz' attempt to purchase the nearby Georgetown Raiders fell through, but by July 2006 the local Campbellville resident Heinz had talked Forgione into selling the Icehawks, and the affiliation with the IceDogs ended. Heinz sold the team just nine months later after starting the season with essentially no committed players.

=== DeVincentis and Piett era ===
Dean Piett, a commercial real estate businessman from Burlington, and Rob DeVincentis, the Ancaster owner of a construction business, purchased the team from Heinz and owned the team from 2007 to 2017.

=== Move to Brantford ===
DeVincentis sold the team in 2017 to Darren DeDobbelaer of Brantford, whose son Eric played on the Junior B Brantford 99ers, which DeDobbelaer also owned. The Ontario Hockey Association originally blocked the $500,000 sale of the IceHawks to prevent DeDobbelaer from moving the team to Brantford, or promoting the 99ers to Jr. A and demoting the IceHawks in Milton to Jr. B. Complicating matters was that Brad Grant, who previously owned the team, was OHA chairman at the time of the proposed sale. The sale was ultimately approved on the condition that the IceHawks remain in Milton for the 2017–18 season. The team the announced that starting in the 2018–19 season the team would relocate to Brantford to play under the 99ers name with the OJHL's approval. However, this move was denied by the Ontario Hockey Association, the overseeing organization for the Ontario Junior Hockey League, by refusing to send officials to their first game in Brantford on September 13 and the Icehawks were forced to stay in Milton for another season.

On October 21, the OHA and OJHL announced the relocation of the team back to Brantford.

=== New Ownership ===
In 2023, DeDobbelaer sold the team to another buyer, marking the 2023/24 season starting under new ownership for the team.

== Season-by-season results ==
1970 - 2018 "MILTON History" - - is hidden click to
Season	GP	W	L	T	OTL	GF	GA	P	Results	Playoffs
1970-71	33	12	17	4	-	147	166	28	7th MOJBHL	
1971-72	42	13	20	9	-	171	231	35	5th CJBHL	
1972-73	42	9	30	3	-	171	278	21	7th CJBHL	
1973-74	42	25	10	7	-	246	174	57	2nd CJBHL	
1974-75	40	11	27	2	-	179	274	24	5th CJBHL	
1975-76	36	12	21	3	-	167	237	27	7th CJBHL	
1976-77	42	17	22	3	-	206	237	37	6th CJBHL	
1977-78	42	20	16	6	-	229	243	46	4th CJBHL	
1978-79	44	16	23	5	-	205	277	37	7th CJBHL	
1979-80	44	10	28	5	-	192	298	25	11th CJBHL	
1980-81	44	4	37	3	-	184	337	11	12th CJBHL	
1981-82	40	6	30	4	-	156	303	16	11th CJBHL	
1982-83	42	18	18	6	-	200	233	42	5th CJBHL	
1983-84	40	12	23	5	-	182	200	29	7th CJBHL	
1984-85	40	20	16	4	-	193	166	44	5th CJBHL	
1985-86	48	5	37	6	-	173	354	16	9th CJBHL	
1986-87	42	9	29	4	-	158	278	22	7th CJBHL	
1987-88	44	18	22	4	-	232	250	40	9th CJBHL	
1988-89	42	12	26	4	-	164	250	28	12th CJBHL	
1989-90	42	18	17	7	-	189	181	43	6th CJBHL	
1990-91	42	25	10	7	-	265	184	57	3rd CJBHL	
1991-92	42	29	8	5	-	207	138	63	2nd CJBHL	Won League
1992-93	49	32	15	2	-	269	190	68	5th CJBHL	
1993-94	42	24	16	2	-	228	183	52	5th OPJHL-W	
1994-95	49	33	14	2	-	287	226	69	1st OPJHL-W	
1995-96	50	27	16	7	-	243	172	64	1st OPJHL-Mi	
1996-97	51	37	9	5	-	319	169	81	1st OPJHL-Mi	Won League
1997-98	51	42	8	1	0	357	127	85	1st OPJHL-Mi	Won League, Won DHC
1998-99	51	43	4	3	1	308	138	90	1st OPJHL-W	
1999-00	49	30	13	3	3	231	158	66	3rd OPJHL-W	
2000-01	49	29	14	5	1	210	168	64	1st OPJHL-W	
2001-02	49	25	20	3	1	198	208	54	5th OPJHL-W	
2002-03	49	41	6	1	1	279	139	84	1st OPJHL-W	
2003-04	49	32	15	0	2	228	161	66	4th OPJHL-W	
2004-05	49	30	17	1	1	241	131	62	4th OPJHL-W	
2005-06	49	41	3	4	1	254	97	87	1st OPJHL-W	Lost Conf. SF
2006-07	49	12	31	4	2	142	235	30	8th OPJHL-W	Lost Conf. QF
2007-08	49	22	20	-	7	185	194	51	6th OPJHL-W	
2008-09	49	21	24	-	4	208	229	46	6th OJHL-M	
2009-10	56	3	51	-	2	145	387	8	15th OJAHL	DNQ
2010-11	50	5	41	-	4	147	374	14	8th OJHL-W	DNQ
2011-12	49	18	28	-	3	195	264	39	5th OJHL-W	Lost Division QF
2012-13	55	19	27	-	9	209	255	47	4th OJHL-W	DNQ
2013-14	53	29	20	-	3	186	193	61	3rd OJHL-W	Lost Conf. QF
2014-15	-	-	-	-	-	-	-	-	-	-
2015-16	54	5	48	0	1	110	362	11	5th of 5 West Div; 11th of 11 SW Conf; 22nd of 22 OJHL	DNQ
2016-17	54	4	48	1	1	125	385	10	5th of 5 West Div; 11th of 11 SW Conf; 22nd of 22 OJHL	DNQ
2017-18	54	4	47	0	3	125	385	11	5th of 5 West Div; 11th of 11 SW Conf; 22nd of 22 OJHL	DNQ

2018 - current
Brantford 99'ers
2018-19	54	17	30	2	5	154	226	41	5th of 6 West Div; 10th of 11 NW Conf; 19th of 22 OJHL	DNQ
2019-20	53	28	24	0	1	191	180	57	5th of 6 West Div; 8th of 11 NW Conf; 16th of 22 OJHL	Lost Conf Quarterfinals 0-4 (Blades)
2020-21	Season cancelled due to COVID-19									
2021-22	54	21	29	1	3	159	203	46	5th of 5 West Div; 8th of 10 NW Conf; 16th of 21 OJHL	DNQ
2022-23	54	5	46	1	2	107	282	13	10th of 10 NW Conf; 21st of 21 OJHL	DNQ
2023-24	56	26	26	0	4	165	204	56	8th of 12 West Conf; 17th of 24 OJHL	Lost Conf Quarterfinals 0-4 (Blues)

== Sutherland Cup appearances ==
1992: Kitchener Dutchmen defeated Milton Merchants 4-games-to-1

== Notable alumni ==
Many notable players have suited up for Milton over the years including NHL stars John Tavares, Daniel Carcillo, Rick Nash, Sam Gagner, Rich Peverley, Darren Haydar, Cody Goloubef and Matt Read.

Some famous Miltonians have also played for the franchise, including four-time Stanley Cup champion John Tonelli, AHL star Darren Haydar, two-time NCAA Frozen Four champion Boston College captain Matt Price, and his brother Jeremy Price (Vancouver Canucks' draft pick).

- Akim Aliu
- John Tonelli
- Daniel Carcillo
- Jay Caufield
- Jeff Daw
- Sam Gagner
- Darren Haydar
- John Tavares
- Matt Read
- Rich Peverley
