= Pickering Panthers =

- City: Pickering, Ontario, Canada
- League: Ontario Junior Hockey League
- Founded: 1972
- Home arena: Pickering Recreation Complex
- Colours: Navy, maroon, white, and gold
- Owner(s): Lu Qi, P. Eng.
- General manager: Sean Meyers
- Head coach: Connor Armour

The Pickering Panthers are a Junior "A" ice hockey team from Pickering, Ontario, Canada. They are a part of North Division of the Ontario Junior Hockey League.

== History ==
In the summer of 2010, the Panthers accepted a merger with the Ajax Attack.

=== 2007 Marathon Game ===
On February 10, 2007, after 154 minutes and 32 seconds of play, the Toronto Jr. Canadiens defeated the Pickering Panthers in Game 2 of the first round of the playoffs. The game-winning goal was credited to Kyle Wetering at the 4:32 mark of the 6th overtime, after the teams played 60 minutes of regulation, 10 minutes in the first overtime period, and then 20 minute overtime periods thereafter. Toronto outshot Pickering 88–86. On February 12, 2007, TSN show That's Hockey showed highlights of the game and announced that it may be honoured in the Hockey Hall of Fame as the longest junior hockey game in history, far surpassing the last recorded record. A feature column also appeared in the Toronto Sun about the historical game. The game has been officially named the longest game in Ontario Hockey Association history.

=== First OJHL Championship ===
The 2021–22 season marked the most successful season for the Panthers. They finished first in the North Division and was the top team in the Northwest Conference and second in overall in the league. Their success continued into the playoffs claiming the OJHL Championship over Toronto and making it to the Centennial Cup finals, where they would be defeated by the Brooks Bandits.

== Season-by-season results ==
Season	GP	W	L	T	OTL	GF	GA	P	Results	Playoffs
1972–73	35	13	19	3	–	114	158	29	7th Metro B	Lost 1st round
1973–74	44	34	6	4	–	272	135	72	1st Metro B	Lost 2nd round
1974–75	38	25	6	7	–	259	133	57	2nd Metro B	Lost final (Div Title)
1975–76	34	18	12	4	–	163	134	40	4th Metro B	Lost 1st round
1976–77	34	17	13	4	–	166	164	38	4th Metro B	Lost 2nd round
1977–78	36	19	14	3	–	217	179	41	3rd Metro B	Lost 2nd round
1978–79	44	19	19	6	–	214	210	44	8th Metro B	Lost 1st round
1979–80	42	22	16	4	–	248	185	48	6th Metro B	Lost 2nd round
1980–81	42	26	14	2	–	210	154	54	3rd Metro B	Lost final (Div Title)
1981–82	36	15	17	4	–	188	174	34	6th Metro B	Lost 1st round
1982–83	35	15	15	5	–	141	149	35	6th Metro B	Lost final (Div Title)
1983–84	42	23	13	6	–	197	174	52	4th Metro B	Lost 2nd round
1984–85	36	17	15	4	–	183	163	38	6th Metro B	Lost 1st round
1985–86	36	29	5	2	–	287	128	60	1st Metro B	Won League (Div Title)
1986–87	37	28	7	2	–	213	115	58	2nd Metro B	Lost final (Div Title)
1987–88	37	19	12	6	–	191	130	44	4th Metro B	Lost 1st round
1988–89	39	15	16	8	–	182	181	38	6th Metro B	Lost 1st round
1989–90	44	7	32	5	–	155	300	19	11th Metro B	DNQ
1990–91	44	7	32	5	–	150	269	19	11th Metro B	DNQ
1991–92	44	13	28	3	–	190	235	29	10th Metro A	Won Qualifying Rd 3–0 Wellington Dukes; L quarter-final 0–4 Thornhill Thunderbirds
1992–93	48	13	30	5	–	198	292	31	13th Metro A	DNQ
1993–94	50	4	43	3	–	171	345	11	14th Metro A	DNQ
1994–95	49	10	37	2	–	161	331	22	14th Metro A	DNQ
1995–96	52	14	32	6	–	197	259	34	9th Metro A	DNQ
1996–97	50	34	12	4	–	232	163	72	4th Metro A	Won Qualifying Rd 4–2 Oshawa Legionaires; Eliminated Quarterfinal; Sixth round robin (0–5–1)
1997–98	50	16	27	7	–	173	213	39	13th Metro A	Lost Qualifying Rd 2–3 Syracuse Jr. Crunch
1998–99	51	37	14	0	0	249	162	74	1st OPJHL-E	Lost semi-final (4th Rd)
1999-00	49	11	32	4	2	154	218	28	9th OPJHL-S	Lost 1st round
2000–01	49	21	19	7	2	198	194	51	4th OPJHL-S	Lost 1st round
2001–02	49	20	22	5	2	188	193	47	5th OPJHL-S	Lost 2nd round
2002–03	49	13	31	3	2	154	218	31	7th OPJHL-S	Lost 1st round
2003–04	49	12	30	7	0	168	221	31	8th OPJHL-S	Lost 1st round
2004–05	49	29	15	2	3	218	171	63	5th OPJHL-S	Lost 1st round
2005–06	49	30	17	1	1	228	173	62	3rd OPJHL-S	Lost 2nd round
2006–07	49	26	21	2	0	222	189	54	5th OPJHL-S	Lost quarter-final (3rd Rd)
2007–08	49	10	38	–	1	135	260	21	9th OPJHL-S	DNQ
2008–09	49	16	30	–	3	148	249	35	8th OJHL-R	Lost 1st round
2009–10	50	15	31	–	4	178	252	34	10th CCHL-E	DNQ
2010–11	50	14	33	–	3	142	205	31	8th OJHL-E	DNQ
2011–12	49	11	37	–	1	141	280	23	6th OJHL-S	Lost 1st round
2012–13	55	13	37	–	5	145	274	31	5th OJHL-N	DNQ
2013–14	53	22	25	–	6	168	202	50	3rd OJHL-N	Lost 1st round
2014–15	54	20	26	1	7	193	242	48	4th OJHL-N	DNQ
2015–16	54	15	32	2	5	154	223	37	5th of 6 Nor Div; 10th of 11 NE Conf; 19th of 22 OJHL	DNQ
2016–17	54	9	42	1	2	120	253	21	6th of 6 Nor Div; 11th of 11 NE Conf; 21st of 22 OJHL	DNQ
2017–18	54	26	24	1	3	180	165	56	4th of 6 Nor Div; 7th of 11 NE Conf; 13st of 22 OJHL	Lost Division quarter-final 3–4 (Wellington Dukes)
2018–19	55	23	29	0	3	141	183	−42	4th of 5 Nor Div; 9th of 11 NE Conf; 17th of 22 OJHL	DNQ
2019–20	54	32	18	2	2	193	147	46	1st of 5 Nor Div; 3rd of 11 NW Conf; 7th of 22 OJHL	Won Division quarterfinal 4–0 (Georgetown Raiders); Remaining playoffs cancelled due to COVID-19 pandemic
2020–21	Season cancelled due to COVID-19									
2021–22	54	39	11	0	4	199	135	82	1st of 5 Nor Div; 1st of 10 NW Conf; 2nd of 21 OJHL	Won Conf Quarterfinals 2–0 (Stouffville Spirit); Won Conf Semifinals 2–0 (Collingwood Blues); Won Conf Finals 3–0 (Milton Menace); Won OJHL CHAMPIONSHIP 4–3 (Toronto Jr. Canadiens); Advanced to Centennial Cup
2022–23	54	32	20	2	0	196	154	66	4th of 10 NW Conf; 9th of 21 OJHL	Lost Conf Quarterfinals 1–4 (Milton Menace)
2023–24	56	15	35	1	5	168	267	36	10th of 12 NW Conf; 20th of 24 OJHL	Did Not Qualify for Post Season
2024–25	56	25	26	1	4	166	188	55	8th of 12 NW Conf; 14th of 24 OJHL	Lost Conf Quarterfinals 1–4 (Trenton Golden Hawks)

== Centennial Cup – Revised format 2022 ==
Canadian Jr. A National Championships
Maritime Junior Hockey League, Quebec Junior Hockey League, Central Canada Hockey League, Ontario Junior Hockey League, Northern Ontario Junior Hockey League, Superior International Junior Hockey League, Manitoba Junior Hockey League, Saskatchewan Junior Hockey League, Alberta Junior Hockey League, and Host. The BCHL declared itself an independent league and there is no BC representative.
Round-robin play in two 5-team pools with top three in pool advancing to determine a Champion.

Year	Round-robin	Record	Standing	Quarterfinal	Semifinal	Championship
2022	W, Red Lake Miners (SIJHL), 9–2; W, Estevan Bruins (Host), 10–5; OTW, Longueuil Collège Français (LHJQ), 3–2; L, Brooks Bandits (AJHL), 1–9	2–1–1–0	2nd of 5 Pool A	OTW – 3–2; Flin Flon Bombers (SJHL)	W – 2–0; Dauphin Kings (ManJHL)	L – 1–4; Brooks Bandits (AJHL)

== Notable alumni ==
- Andy Andreoff
- Glenn Healy
- Cameron Palmer
- Tanner Shaw
- Sean McMorrow
- Joe Nieuwendyk
- Bernie Saunders, 5th black player in NHL history
