= 2010 World Junior A Challenge =

Tournament details
- Host country: Canada
- Venue(s): South Okanagan Events Centre in Penticton, British Columbia
- Dates: November 8, 2010 – November 14, 2010
- Teams: 6

Final positions
- Champions: United States (3rd title)
- Runners-up: Canada East
- Third place: Switzerland
- Fourth place: Canada West

Tournament statistics
- Games played: 13
- Scoring leader: (Canada) Evan Rodrigues (7 points)

Awards
- MVP: (United States) Scott Mayfield

The 2010 World Junior A Challenge was an international Junior "A" ice hockey tournament hosted by Hockey Canada. The 2010 World Junior A Challenge was hosted by Penticton, British Columbia, from November 8 to November 14, 2010, at the South Okanagan Events Centre.

== Teams ==
The two host Canadian teams will return, along with Russia, Sweden and the United States. Replacing Belarus at the event was Switzerland, attending for the first time in the tournament's five-year history.

== Summary ==
=== Exhibition ===
In early exhibition action, Canada East avenged years of frustration against their nemesis Canada West with a 7–2 victory. The next day, the victory did not translate into anything for Canada East as they fell apart late against Russia in a 7–4 loss. Canada West finished off the exhibition series winless, dropping their next-day game 5–3 to the 2-time defending champion United States.

=== Round Robin ===
Like many years, the round robin was as unpredictable as ever. Upstart Switzerland went perfect in the round robin, defeating Canada West 5–4 in overtime and cruising to a 5–1 win over Russia. The United States was also perfect, crushing Canada East 6-1 and Sweden 5–1. Canada West was not far behind Switzerland in the Pool B standings, following up their overtime loss with a 4–2 victory over Russia. Canada East got over their Pool A crushing to the United States by beating Sweden 6–2. Both Sweden and Russia went winless in the round robin to round out the two pools.

=== Quarter-final ===
The quarter-finals were hope for some, while heartbreak for others. Despite badly outshooting their opponents in both games, Russia and Sweden were both relegated to the 5th Place Match on Friday. Canada East defeated Russia 4–3, while Canada West defeated Sweden 3–2. While both Canada teams now move on to the semi-finals, Russia and Sweden will battle for pride and 5th place.

=== 5th Place and Semi-final ===
In the 5th Place Game, Sweden, who had never won a game at the 2009 or 2010 WJAC to date was facing the 2009 Bronze Medallist Russia. Sweden took control early and took a 4–1 lead into the third period, where they held off a late Russian surge to win the game 5–4.

In Semi-final #1, undefeated Switzerland was up against Canada East. The game started off ugly, when Switzerland scored on their own net on a delayed penalty to give Canada East a 1–0 lead. Canada East was neck-to-neck with Switzerland, but took a 3–1 lead into the third. Switzerland turned on their jets and outshot Canada East 18–4 in the third, but Canada East still came out with the 4–2 victory. Switzerland moved on to the Bronze Medal Game, while Canada East goes to their first Gold Medal Game since the 2007 World Junior A Challenge.

In Semi-final #2, the undefeated United States played Canada West. For the past two years, these two teams have faced each other in the Gold Medal Game, but this time a berth to the finals is on the line. The USA dominated early and often, winning 5-1 and outshooting Canada West 36–28. The victory puts the United States in line for a potential record third straight gold medal at the event, while with the loss Canada West is in line for its worst placing at the event since its inception.

=== Bronze and Gold ===
In the Bronze Medal Game, Switzerland came out with their guns blazing and crushed Canada West 8–3 to win a medal in their first ever World Junior A Challenge. Badly outshooting Canada West 44–16, Switzerland has deprived Canada West of a medal for the first time since the tournament began in 2006.

Win or lose, Canada East's fortunes rested on the play of goaltender Jordan Ruby. Ruby's goaltending was phenomenal in the quarter- and semi-final of the tournament stopping 74 of 79 shots. The two-time defending United States had steamrolled all competition in their three tournament games, outscoring their opponents 16–3. From the start of the game it became clear that most of the game was going to end up in the Canada East zone. Winning 2–1 after the first period despite being outshot 14–10, things were looking up for Canada East. Canada East chased USA's Zane Gothberg from the net with two quick goals to build a 4–1 lead, but this seemed not to demoralize the Americans but fire them up. From that point on Jordan Ruby would face roughly 28 shots in the next 33 minutes of play. The play rarely left the Canadian's zone and eventually the Americans climbed back into the game. The Canadians could not must much offence in this time frame, only managing 10 more shots in the final 35 minutes of play. Austin Czarnik would tie the game 4–4 with 4:33 to go and with 3:53 to go Jimmy Mullin scored the winner. The US would score an empty net goal with a minute to go to finish the game and clinch their third straight championship.

== Exhibition schedule ==
Exhibition Results
Game	Team	Score	Team	Score	Notes	Date – Time – Location
Ex1	Canada West	2	Canada East	7	Final - Shots: 25-22 CANE	Nov 5, 2010 - 19:00 PST - Vernon, BC
Ex2	Canada West	3	United States	5	Final - Shots: 43-29 USA	Nov 6, 2010 - 19:30 PST - Penticton, BC
Ex3	Canada East	4	Russia	7	Final - Shots: 33-30 CANE	Nov 6, 2010 - 19:00 PST - West Kelowna, BC

== 2010 Tournament ==
=== Group A ===
Pos	Team	Pld	W	OTW	OTL	L	GF	GA	GD	Pts
1	United States	2	2	0	0	0	11	2	+9	4
2	Canada East	2	1	0	0	1	7	8	−1	2
3	Sweden	2	0	0	0	2	3	11	−8	0

=== Group B ===
Pos	Team	Pld	W	OTW	OTL	L	GF	GA	GD	Pts
1	Switzerland	2	1	1	0	0	10	5	+5	4
2	Canada West	2	1	0	1	0	8	7	+1	3
3	Russia	2	0	0	0	2	3	9	−6	0

=== Results ===
Round-robin results
Game	Pool	Team	Score	Team	Score	Notes	Date – Time – Location
1	A	Canada East	1	United States	6	Final - Shots: 37-24 USA	Nov 8, 2010 - 16:00 PST - Penticton, BC
2	B	Canada West	4	Switzerland	5	OT Final - Shots: 31-28 SUI	Nov 8, 2010 - 19:30 PST - Penticton, BC
3	A	Sweden	2	Canada East	6	Final - Shots: 36-27 SWE	Nov 9, 2010 - 16:00 PST - Penticton, BC
4	B	Switzerland	5	Russia	1	Final - Shots: 52-39 SUI	Nov 9, 2010 - 19:30 PST - Penticton, BC
5	A	United States	5	Sweden	1	Final - Shots: 33-30 SWE	Nov 10, 2010 - 16:00 PST - Penticton, BC
6	B	Russia	2	Canada West	4	Final - Shots: 53-30 CANW	Nov 10, 2010 - 19:30 PST - Penticton, BC

=== Championship Round ===
Championship Results
Game	Round	Team	Score	Team	Score	Notes	Date – Time – Location
7	Quarter	Russia	3	Canada East	4	Final - Shots: 38-30 RUS	Nov 11, 2010 - 16:00 PST - Penticton, BC
8	Quarter	Sweden	2	Canada West	3	Final - Shots: 33-22 SWE	Nov 11, 2010 - 19:30 PST - Penticton, BC
9	5th Plc.	Sweden	5	Russia	4	Final - Shots: 29-28 SWE	Nov 12, 2010 - 19:30 PST - Penticton, BC
10	Semi	Canada East	4	Switzerland	2	Final - Shots: 41-29 SUI	Nov 13, 2010 - 14:00 PST - Penticton, BC
11	Semi	Canada West	1	United States	5	Final - Shots: 36-28 USA	Nov 13, 2010 - 18:00 PST - Penticton, BC
12	Bronze	Switzerland	8	Canada West	3	Final - Shots: 44-16 SUI	Nov 14, 2010 - 13:30 PST - Penticton, BC
13	Gold	Canada East	4	United States	6	Final - Shots: 43-22 USA	Nov 14, 2010 - 17:30 PST - Penticton, BC

=== Final standings ===
	Team
1st place, gold medalist(s)	United States
2nd place, silver medalist(s)	Canada East
3rd place, bronze medalist(s)	Switzerland
4th	Canada West
5th	Sweden
6th	Russia

== Statistics ==
=== Scorers ===
Scoring Leaders
Player	Team	GP	G	A	P	PIM
(Canada) Evan Rodrigues	Canada East	5	3	4	7	2
(Russia) Nikita Kucherov	Russia	4	2	5	7	2
(United States) Jimmy Mullin	United States	4	6	0	6	2
(Switzerland) Gregory Hofmann	Switzerland	4	4	2	6	6
(Russia) Mikhail Grigorenko	Russia	4	3	3	6	0
(Canada) Scott Wilson	Canada East	5	3	3	6	4
(United States) Seth Ambroz	United States	4	2	3	5	2
(Canada) Zach Hyman	Canada East	5	2	3	5	4
(Canada) Clarke Breitkreuz	Canada West	5	1	4	5	8
(United States) Sam Warning	United States	4	2	2	4	2

=== Goaltenders ===
Please note: 60 mins minimum.

Leading goaltenders
Player	Team	GP	Mins	GA	SO	GAA	Sv%	Record
(Switzerland) Remo Giovannini	Switzerland	2	119:41	4	0	2.01	0.941	1-1
(United States) Zane Gothberg	United States	4	205:00	7	0	2.05	0.929	3–0
(Canada) Jordan Ruby	Canada East	5	298:24	18	0	3.62	0.907	3–2
(Russia) Oleg Dyatlov	Russia	3	143:04	9	0	3.77	0.901	0–2
(Russia) Denis Perevozchikov	Russia	2	96:55	9	0	5.57	0.877	0–2

== Awards ==
Most Valuable Player: Scott Mayfield (United States)

All-Star Team

Forwards: Evan Rodrigues (Canada East), Jimmy Mullin (United States), Mikhail Grigorenko (Russia)
Defense: Scott Mayfield (United States), Tyson Wilson (Canada East)
Goalie: Jordan Ruby (Canada East)

== Rosters ==
=== Canada East ===
(Canada) Players: Justin Gilbert, Jordan Ruby, Luke Juha, Tyler McCarthy, Matt Chiarantano, Brennan Serville, Tyson Wilson, Alexandre Tardif, Phil Hampton, Scott Wilson, Tyson Spink, Zach Hyman, Tylor Spink, Evan Rodrigues, Matthew Peca, Jesse Beamish, Mitch Zion, Maxime Dumond, Nick Huard, Kyle Baun, Robert Polesello, Jason Lacroix.

Staff: Curtis Hodgins, Patrice Bosch, Todd Gill, Danielle Korol, Harley Palmer, Paul Gagné, Troy Ryan.

=== Canada West ===
(Canada) Players: Jameson Shortreed, Matthew Krahn, Nolan Kaiser, Sam Jardine, Craig Bokenfohr, Ben Gallacher, Rhett Holland, Joey Laleggia, Sean Flanagan, Travis St. Denis, Reed Linaker, John Lidgett, Madison Dias, Clarke Breitkreuz, Grayson Downing, Dylan Walchuk, Drew George, Sam Mellor, Brendan O'Donnell, Mitchell Vanteeling, Mark MacMillan.

Staff: Andrew Milne, Barry Wolfe, Jomar Cruz, Larry Wintoneak, Chad Oliver, Rylan Ferster. Bill Marr (Medical Trainer)

=== Russia ===
(Russia) Players: Denis Perevozchikov, Oleg Dyatlov, Gennady Sabinin, Alexey Vasilevskiy, Vitaly Demakov, Konstantin Vorshev, Nikita Nesterov, Anton Saveliev, Albert Yarullin, Evgeny Palenga, Dmitry Mikhailov, Roman Konkov, Anton Ivanyuzhenkov, Sergei Abramov, Alexey Shamin, Nikita Kucherov, Maxim Shalunov, Sergey Smurov, Mikhail Grigorenko, Alexander Petrov, Vladimir Tkachev, Alexey Shubin.

Staff: Yuri Rumyantsev, Stanislav Shadrin, Vladimir Nikulin, Sergey Raspopov, Yan Vorobiev, Boris Sapronenkov, Oleg Norchenko.

=== Sweden ===
(Sweden) Players: Mattius Bäckman, Rasmus Edström, Mattias Granlund, Filip Gunnarsson, Jonas Gunnarsson, Tim Harrysson, Linus Hultström, Alexander Lagerström, Eddie Larsson, Daniel Mannberg, Pontus Netterberg, Joakim Nordström, Christian Nyman, Jesper Olofsson, Sebastian Ottosson, Oscar Persson, Viktor Ronnbäck, Linus Rotbakken, Joakim Ryan, Marcus Sörensen, Erik Thorell, Pathrik Vesterholm.

Staff: Lars Lindgren, Patrik Sundström, Christer Höglund, Krister Holm, Nicklas Lindvall, Jan Johansson, Par Thures.

=== Switzerland ===
(Switzerland) Players: Luca Camperchioli, Samuel Erni, Samuel Guerra, Gaëtan Haas, Yannick Herren, Manuel Holenstein, Grégory Hofmann, Dean Kukan, Raphael Kuonen, Romain Loeffel, Ryan McGregor, Lukas Meili, Benjamin Neukom, Inti Pestoni, Joël Reymondin, Matthias Rossi, Reto Schäppi, Tristan Scherwey, Nicholas Steiner, Remo Trub, Joël Vermin, Patrick Zubler.

Staff: Richard Jost, Alex Reinhard, Sergio Soguel, Bruni Suri, Jorg Rutishauser, Johannes Keel, Thomas Ritter.

=== United States ===
(United States) Players: Casey DeSmith, Zane Gothberg, Brian Cooper, Tommy Fallen, Aaron Harstad, Nick Mattson, Scott Mayfield, Jordan Schmaltz, Sam Windle, Garrett Allen, Seth Ambroz, Austin Czarnik, Ryan Dzingel, Robert Francis, Max Gaede, Caleb Herbert, Cason Hohmann, Max McCormick, Jimmy Mullin, Michael Parks, Colten St. Clair, Sam Warning.

Staff: P. K. O'Handley, Luke Strand, Justin Lyle, Darren Flinchem, Todd Klein, Marc Boxer, Alan Ashare.
