= Scott Wilson (ice hockey) =

Canadian ice hockey player (born 1992)

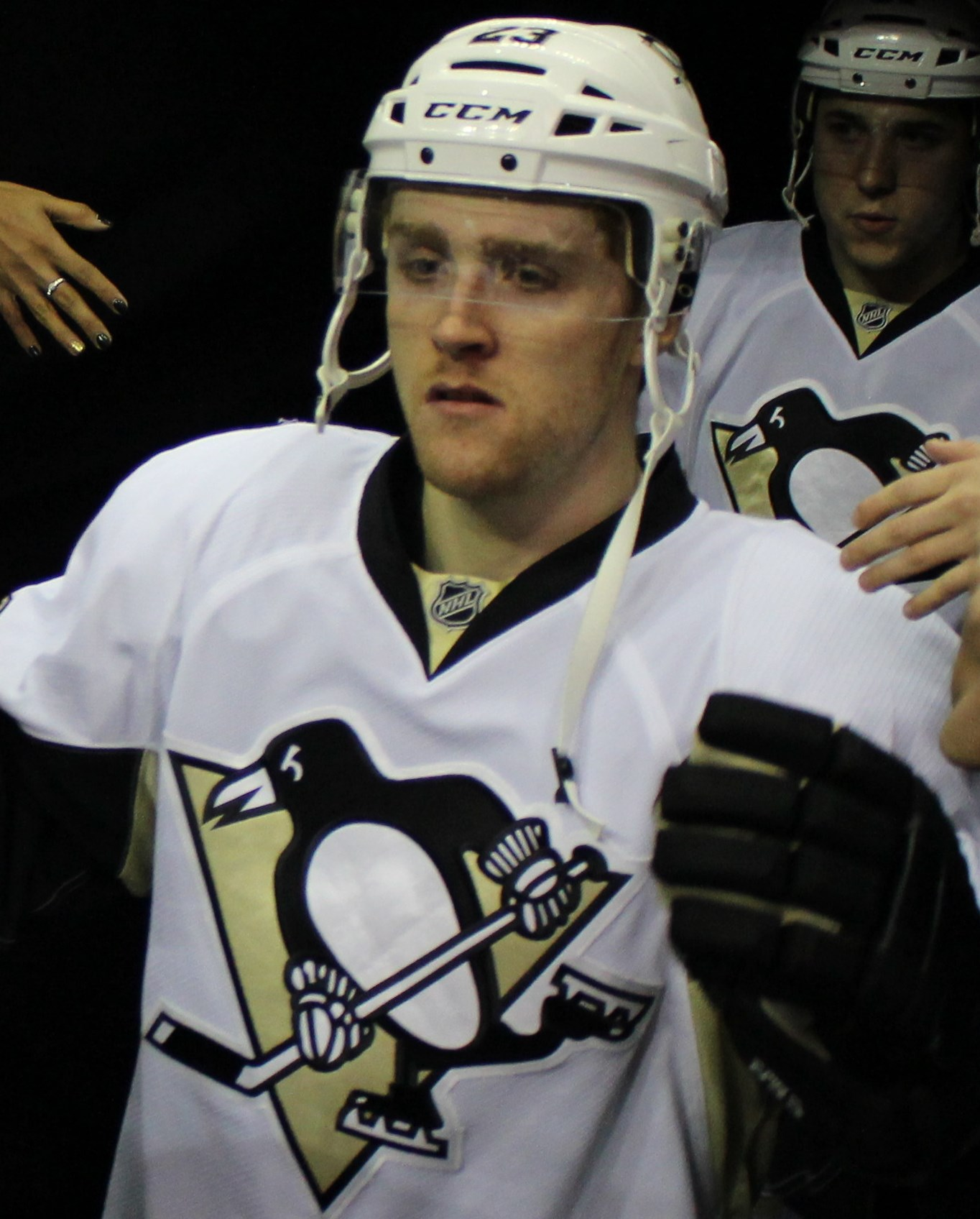
- Wilson with the Pittsburgh Penguins in 2016
- Born: April 24, 1992 (age 34) Oakville, Ontario, Canada
- Height: 5 ft 11 in (180 cm)
- Weight: 183 lb (83 kg; 13 st 1 lb)
- Position: Centre
- Shoots: Left
- KHL team Former teams: SKA Saint Petersburg; Pittsburgh Penguins; Detroit Red Wings; Buffalo Sabres; HC Vityaz; Metallurg Magnitogorsk; Salavat Yulaev Ufa; Sibir Novosibirsk
- NHL draft: 209th overall, 2011; Pittsburgh Penguins
- Playing career: 2014–present

Scott Wilson (born April 24, 1992) is a Canadian professional ice hockey player who is currently playing with SKA Saint Petersburg in the Kontinental Hockey League (KHL). He has played with the Pittsburgh Penguins, with whom he earned two Stanley Cup championships, Detroit Red Wings and Buffalo Sabres in the National Hockey League (NHL).

Wilson was selected by the Pittsburgh Penguins in the 2011 NHL entry draft with the 28th pick (209th overall) of the seventh round. Wilson completed his junior season for the UMass Lowell River Hawks in 2014.

== Playing career ==
=== Junior ===
Wilson started his junior career on the Georgetown Raiders with a short 7-game stint for the 2008–09 season, scoring one point in the process. The next year Wilson played in every game (56) for the Raiders, finishing the season with 67 points, good enough for third best on the team. Georgetown continued its recent winning ways in 2009–10 season, going 41–10–5 and marched into the playoffs with Scott Wilson among the leaders. After dropping the Villanova Knights 4–2 in the first round, Georgetown fell to the #2-seed Oakville Blades 4–1. In the 11 playoff games Scott Wilson finished second on the Raiders with 17 points (9 goals, 8 assists).

Wilson returned to Georgetown for 2010–11 and put up very similar numbers to his first year, scoring 61 points in 42 games (14 fewer games than the year before). The Raiders slid in the standings, ending up with a 32–15–2–1 record and though it was good enough for them to earn a bye past the qualifier, they entered the round of 16 facing off against the #3-seed Oakville Blades. in a reprise from the previous season, Oakville won the series 4–1. In four games Wilson managed 3 points, a far cry from his previous season. Despite the playoff disappointment, Wilson was able to not only earn a spot on U. Mass-Lowell's roster starting the upcoming fall, but he was also taken by the Pittsburgh Penguins in the 2011 NHL Entry Draft.

=== College ===
From the start of the 2011–12 season, it was apparent that Lowell would have a resurgence from their abysmal 5-win season the year before when they matched the win total by mid-November. It wasn't until two separate 5-game win streaks that the River Hawks showed how improved they were with new players and under 1st-year coach Norm Bazin. Lowell entered the Hockey East tournament as the #2-seed with a 22–10–1 record, facing the Providence Friars in a best-of-three opening round. Wilson posted a goal and an assist in the first game, but the River Hawks' defence failed them in a 5–3 loss. Lowell won the second game 3–2 in overtime, but couldn't manage any offence in a 1–0 loss as they meekly bowed out of the tournament. Lowell's 23 wins, however, were enough to give them an at-large bid into the 2012 NCAA tournament for the first time in 16 years. the River Hawks were matched up against Miami (Ohio) and dropped the RedHawks 4–3 in overtime. Their tournament was short-lived, however, as they couldn't hold off the #1-seed (3rd overall) Union Dutchmen, losing 4–2. Despite the loss, it was one of Lowells most successful campaigns since they joined Division I hockey in 1984. Though he was held to only an assist in Lowell's final four games, Wilson finished the season second in team scoring with 38 points and was named the Hockey East Rookie-of-the-year.

Returning for his sophomore season, both Wilson and the River Hawks started 2012–13 very slow. Regardless of their #7 ranking in the USCHO preseason poll, Lowell opened with a 2–5–1 mark with Wilson managing only a single goal in the 8 games. After an 8–2 trouncing of the Massachusetts Minutemen on November 18, followed by freshman goaltender Connor Hellebuyck taking over the starting role in net, the River Hawks got back to their winning ways, going 19–5–1 the rest of the way, including 7- and 9-game winning streaks. during this time Scott Wilson rediscovered his scoring touch, failing to record a point in only 8 of the 25 games after the bad start, helping Lowell cruise into the conference tournament as the number 1 seed, winning their first Hockey East regular season title. Lowell faced Maine in the first round, downing the Black Bears in straight games, 4–2 and 2–1 With Scott Wilson notching 2 goals and an assist in the two games. The second round matchup saw the River Hawks against Providence and after a quick goal from the Friars, it looked like Lowell would be ousted from the Hockey East tournament for the second time in two years, but shortly after the third period started the River Hawks tied the score, allowing Wilson to pot the game-winner with 7:30 left in the game, sending Lowell to the conference title match against the Boston University Terriers. Needing a win to enter the NCAA tournament, Boston University was unable to solve Lowell's defence, but also held the River Hawks off of the score sheet until less than 9 minutes left in regulation when Wilson assisted on the only goal of the game by Derek Arnold, earning U. Mass-Lowell their first ever Hockey East conference title.

While the title victory guaranteed Lowell a spot in the NCAA tournament, their stellar play during the season allowed Lowell to be selected as one of the four #1-seeds (3rd overall) and be placed in the Northeast Regional. In the opening round Lowell was set against the WCHA conference champion Wisconsin Badgers and while Scott Wilson could only manage an assist, nothing else was required as the River Hawks demolished the Badgers 6–1. The next round matched the #2-seed New Hampshire Wildcats against Lowell and Scott Wilson was able to play hero once more, scoring the game-winner with 30 seconds left in the second period and assisting on the only other goal as the River Hawks won 2–0, sending Lowell to the first frozen four in team history. Two weeks later, when the tournament resumed in Pittsburgh, Lowell found themselves down 2–0 early in their semifinal against the Yale Bulldogs. While Lowell was able to tie the game with a pair of goals 14 seconds apart in the third period, Yale scored in overtime, ending Lowell's season two wins short of a national title. 2012–13 ends up being Lowell's most successful Division I season ever in terms of wins (28) winning percentage (.707) and tournament victories (2) as well as their first conference tournament title and conference regular season title. Along the way, Scott Wilson finished tied for the team lead in goals (16) and scoring (38 points) while leading the team outright in power-play goals (6) and game-winning goals (5) despite his slow start.

=== Professional ===
==== Pittsburgh Penguins ====
Wilson officially signed with the Pittsburgh Penguins on April 1, 2014, and finished the 2013–14 season with the Wilkes-Barre/Scranton Penguins of the AHL. His assignment to Wilkes-Barre continued for the 2014–15 season. Wilson spent most of the 2015–16 season with Wilkes-Barre, though he did see action in 24 NHL games and opened the 2016–17 season with parent team.

With Chris Kunitz being a late scratch due to a foot fracture, Wilson made his NHL debut on December 2, 2014 in a 1–0 victory over the New Jersey Devils, but played a team-low 4:21 after suffering a leg injury of his own in the second period.

In the 2015–16 season, Wilson played with the Wilkes-Barre/Scranton Penguins for the first half of the year, leading the American Hockey League with 22 goals which earned him a regular NHL spot with Nick Bonino, Eric Fehr, Evgeni Malkin and Beau Bennett on long-term injured reserve. Wilson earned his first career point on a goal by Phil Kessel on December 21, 2015, sending a stretch pass to the right winger for a breakaway. He scored his first NHL goal on February 18, 2016, against Petr Mrazek of the Detroit Red Wings, one timing a Conor Sheary pass from the left-hand side. On March 24, Wilson suffered a lower body injury and missed the rest of the season although Pittsburgh did give him a Stanley Cup ring for his efforts. During the 2016-17 NHL season, Wilson spent the whole season with Pittsburgh, earning a second Stanley Cup ring and his name on the Stanley Cup for first time.

==== Detroit Red Wings and Buffalo Sabres ====
On October 21, 2017, Wilson was traded to the Detroit Red Wings, along with a third-round pick in the 2018 NHL entry draft, in exchange for Riley Sheahan and a fifth-round pick in 2018.

On December 4, 2017, Wilson was traded to the Buffalo Sabres in exchange for a 5th-round pick in the 2019 NHL entry draft. After missing the first half of the 2018–19 season with an injured ankle, the Sabres placed Wilson on waivers January 8, 2019. Having cleared the following day, Wilson was re-assigned to AHL affiliate, the Rochester Americans.

==== Florida Panthers ====
After parts of three seasons within the Sabres organization, Wilson left as a free agent and signed a one-year, two-way contract with the Florida Panthers on October 21, 2020. In the 2020–21 season, Wilson through injury was limited to just 8 games with the Panthers AHL affiliate, the Syracuse Crunch.

==== Charlotte Checkers ====
Leaving the Panthers at the conclusion of his contract, Wilson as a free agent heading into the 2021–22 season, accepted an invitation to attend the inaugural training camp of the Seattle Kraken on a Professional Try-Out contract on September 15, 2021. Unable to garner a contract with the Kraken, Wilson was re-assigned to join AHL affiliate, the Charlotte Checkers' training camp and was signed to a one-year contract on October 4, 2021. Wilson emerged as an offensive leader with the Checkers, placing second on the team with 24 goals and collecting 40 points through 71 regular season games.

On July 19, 2022, Wilson was re-signed to a one-year contract extension to continue with the Charlotte Checkers for the 2022–23 season.

==== KHL ====
Before returning for a second season with the Checkers, Wilson opted to terminate his contract in order to sign a one-year contract with Russian club, HC Vityaz of the KHL, on August 16, 2022.

Following two offensively productive seasons with Vityaz, Wilson left the club and continued in the KHL by signing a one-year contract with reigning champions, Metallurg Magnitogorsk on May 21, 2024. In the 2024–25 season, Wilson made 30 appearances with Metallurg before he was traded to fellow KHL outfit, Salavat Yulaev Ufa in exchange for monetary compensation on December 27, 2024. Wilson made an immediate impact with Salavat, increasing his offensive output in a top-six scoring role and registering 23 points in 30 appearances to end the regular season. He continued his offensive contributions in the playoffs, helping Salavat reach the Semi-finals in posting 16 points through 19 post-season games.

As a free agent, Wilson continued his tenure in the KHL, securing a two-year contract with Divisional rivals, HC Sibir Novosibirsk, on June 24, 2025. Wilson scored 18 (10+8) points in 43 games in the regular season. On January 25, 2026 Sibir traded Wilson to SKA Saint Petersburg in exchange for Andrei Loktionov.

== Career statistics ==
			Regular season					Playoffs
Season	Team	League	GP	G	A	Pts	PIM	GP	G	A	Pts	PIM
2008–09	Georgetown Raiders	OJHL	6	0	1	1	2	1	0	0	0	0
2009–10	Georgetown Raiders	OJHL	56	24	43	67	28	11	9	8	17	2
2010–11	Georgetown Raiders	OJHL	42	20	41	61	59	4	1	2	3	8
2011–12	UMass Lowell River Hawks	HE	37	16	22	38	26	—	—	—	—	—
2012–13	UMass Lowell River Hawks	HE	41	16	22	38	32	—	—	—	—	—
2013–14	UMass Lowell River Hawks	HE	31	7	12	19	24	—	—	—	—	—
2013–14	Wilkes-Barre/Scranton Penguins	AHL	1	0	0	0	0	—	—	—	—	—
2014–15	Wilkes-Barre/Scranton Penguins	AHL	55	19	22	41	30	3	2	2	4	0
2014–15	Pittsburgh Penguins	NHL	1	0	0	0	0	3	0	0	0	0
2015–16	Wilkes-Barre/Scranton Penguins	AHL	34	22	14	36	19	—	—	—	—	—
2015–16	Pittsburgh Penguins	NHL	24	5	1	6	12	—	—	—	—	—
2016–17	Pittsburgh Penguins	NHL	78	8	18	26	32	20	3	3	6	11
2017–18	Pittsburgh Penguins	NHL	3	0	0	0	0	—	—	—	—	—
2017–18	Detroit Red Wings	NHL	17	0	0	0	0	—	—	—	—	—
2017–18	Buffalo Sabres	NHL	49	6	8	14	8	—	—	—	—	—
2018–19	Rochester Americans	AHL	17	3	4	7	4	—	—	—	—	—
2018–19	Buffalo Sabres	NHL	15	0	3	3	4	—	—	—	—	—
2019–20	Rochester Americans	AHL	37	11	11	22	21	—	—	—	—	—
2019–20	Buffalo Sabres	NHL	6	1	1	2	2	—	—	—	—	—
2020–21	Syracuse Crunch	AHL	8	1	2	3	2	—	—	—	—	—
2021–22	Charlotte Checkers	AHL	71	24	16	40	25	7	0	3	3	2
2022–23	HC Vityaz	KHL	66	20	19	39	14	5	2	0	2	0
2023–24	HC Vityaz	KHL	38	20	10	30	4	—	—	—	—	—
2024–25	Metallurg Magnitogorsk	KHL	30	4	3	7	6	—	—	—	—	—
2024–25	Salavat Yulaev Ufa	KHL	30	9	14	23	12	19	7	9	16	8
2025–26	Sibir Novosibirsk	KHL	43	10	8	18	14	—	—	—	—	—
2025–26	SKA Saint Petersburg	KHL	20	2	8	10	0	4	0	1	1	0
NHL totals			193	20	31	51	58	23	3	3	6	11
KHL totals			227	65	62	127	50	28	9	10	19	8

Medal record

Ice hockey

Representing Canada East

World Junior A Challenge
Silver medal – second place	2010 Penticton	

== Awards and honours ==
Award	Year	Ref
College
All-HE Rookie Team	2012	
HE All-Tournament Team	2013	
NHL
Stanley Cup champion	2017	

Awards and achievements
Preceded by Charlie Coyle	Hockey East Rookie of the Year; 2011–12	Succeeded by Jon Gillies
