= Harrysson =

Harrysson is a surname. Notable people with the surname include:

- Andreas Harrysson (born 1975), Swedish darts player
- Lotta Harrysson (born 1966), Swedish sailor
- Per Harrysson (born 1967), Swedish footballer
- Tim Harrysson (born 1992), Swedish ice hockey player

== See also ==
- Harrison (name)
