= Halmstad Hammers HC =

- City: Halmstad, Sweden
- League: Hockeyettan
- Division: Group F
- Founded: 2006
- Home arena: Halmstad Arena
- Colors: Navy, red
- Head coach: Niklas Söderström
- Captain: Sebastian Kölzow Isaksen
- Website: Official website

Halmstad Hammers HC, until 2017 known as Halmstad HF, is an ice-hockey club in Sweden. The team currently plays in Group F of Division 1. The team was founded in 2006 after the Halmstad Hammers HC who at the time played in the HockeyAllsvenskan went bankrupt.

== Current roster ==
Updated December 1, 2013.

No.	Nat	Player	Pos	S/G	Age	Acquired	Birthplace
23	(Sweden)	Johan Andersson	D	L	40	2012-13	Ljungby, Sweden
33	(Sweden)	Elias Axelsson Svensson	G	L	33	2013-14	Junsele, Sweden
18	(Sweden)	Patrik Bergström	RW	L	42	2013-14	Piteå, Sweden
88	(Sweden)	Marcus Borgh	LW	R	33	2009-10	Sweden
51	(Sweden)	Robin Dahse (A)	LW	L	34	2012-13	Malmö, Sweden
54	(Sweden)	Alexander Edström	D	R	37	2013-14	Värnamo, Sweden
22	(Sweden)	Robin Erlandsson	D	L	38	2006-07	Halmstad, Sweden
47	(Sweden)	Fredrik Göransson	LW	L	32	2008-09	Sweden
4	(Sweden)	John Hoffrén	D	L	39	2010-11	Sweden
79	(Sweden)	Mattias Holfve	D	L	33	2013-14	Falun, Sweden
40	(Sweden)	Ted Jokiniemi	C	L	37	2012-13	Västerås, Sweden
71	(Sweden)	Patrik Kannerling	LW	L	42	2013-14	Ljungby, Sweden
20	(Sweden)	Sebastian Kölzow Isaksen (C)	C	R	38	2010-11	Värnamo, Sweden
8	(Sweden)	Pontus Larsson	D	L	37	2011-12	Sweden
24	(Sweden)	Olle Liss	RW	R	33	2012-13	Dala-Floda, Sweden
46	(Sweden)	Douglas Lögdal	C	R	33	2012-13	Södertälje, Sweden
3	(Sweden)	Philip Martinsson (L)	D	L	33	2013-14	Gothenburg, Sweden
53	(Sweden)	Magnus Nyberg	D	L	38	2009-10	Sundsvall, Sweden
9	(Sweden)	Christian Nyman	C	L	35	2011-12	Luleå, Sweden
15	(Sweden)	Henrik Reis	LW	L	42	2006-07	Halmstad, Sweden
30	(Sweden)	Henrik Stadjer	G	L	38	2013-14	Falun, Sweden
92	(Sweden)	Dennis Svensson	C	L	33	2012-13	Kristianstad, Sweden
19	(Sweden)	Niklas Wentzel (A)	LW	L	39	2008-09	Helsingborg, Sweden

== Season-by-season record ==
Season	League	GP	W	T	L	OTW	OTL	Pts	GF	GA	Finish	Playoffs
2006-07	Division 3	27	23	2	2	-	-	48	176	61	2nd	Promoted
2007-08	Division 2	24	18	2	4	-	-	38	102	53	2nd	-
2008-09	Division 2	27	20	4	3	-	-	44	121	59	1st	Qualified for Kvalserien
	Kvalserien	8	6	-	1	1	0	20	38	19	1st	Promoted
2009-10	Division 1	27	8	-	13	3	3	33	71	99	7th	-
	Division 1 Continuation	10	2	-	7	1	0	12	26	42	4th	-
2010-11	Division 1	27	8	-	16	2	1	29	69	98	8th	-
	Division 1 Continuation	10	7	-	2	0	1	24	39	23	1st	Qualified to stay in Division 1
2011-12	Division 1	27	10	-	14	1	2	34	69	91	7th	-
	Division 1 Continuation	15	5	-	6	3	1	26	47	48	3rd	-
2012-13	Division 1	30	12	-	13	1	4	42	78	82	6th	-
	Division 1 Continuation	12	9	-	3	0	0	33	43	24	1st	Qualified to stay in Division 1
