= Zach Hyman =

Canadian ice hockey player (born 1992)

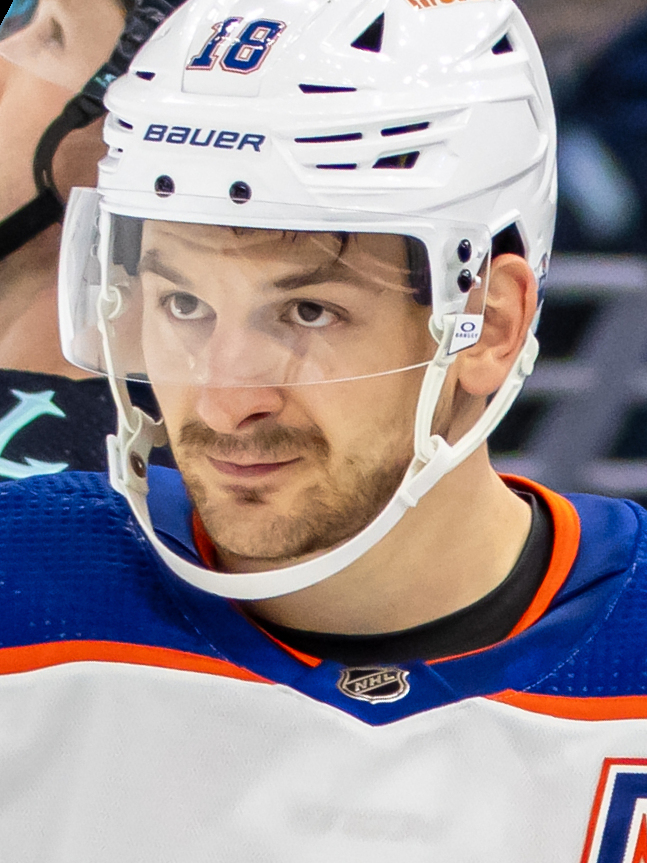
- Hyman with the Edmonton Oilers in 2023
- Born: June 9, 1992 (age 34) Toronto, Ontario, Canada
- Height: 6 ft 1 in (185 cm)
- Weight: 208 lb (94 kg; 14 st 12 lb)
- Position: Left wing
- Shoots: Right
- NHL team Former teams: Edmonton Oilers; Toronto Maple Leafs
- NHL draft: 123rd overall, 2010; Florida Panthers
- Playing career: 2015–present

Zachary Martin Hyman (born June 9, 1992) is a Canadian professional ice hockey player who is a left winger and alternate captain for the Edmonton Oilers of the National Hockey League (NHL). He previously played for the Toronto Maple Leafs. He and his family own the Brantford Bulldogs of the Ontario Hockey League.

Hockey Canada named him the 2011 Canadian Junior Hockey League Player of the Year. In 2013, Hyman represented Canada at the 2013 Maccabiah Games in Israel, where he won a gold medal. During the 2014–15 season, Hyman won a number of awards, including being named the University of Michigan's Athlete of the Year and a First Team All-American, and was a finalist for the Hobey Baker Award.

Hyman was selected by the Florida Panthers in the fifth round of the 2010 NHL entry draft. However, the parties were unable to agree on a contract, and Hyman's rights were traded to the Toronto Maple Leafs on June 19, 2015. During his rookie 2016–17 season, he set a new Maple Leafs record for most short-handed goals scored by a rookie in a season with four, and tied the team record for the most consecutive games with an assist by a rookie at six games.

Hyman has been nicknamed "Shaq Hyman" by fans, staff, and media alike due to his "in the crease" style of play. O'Neal himself has acknowledged and approved of the nickname. Hyman gifted Shaq a custom signed jersey and stick, much to O'Neal's delight. O'Neal returned the gesture by sending Hyman a signed Lakers jersey.

Hyman is a co-founder and co-owner of Toronto-based Eleven Holdings Corp., a gaming and media holding company that owns and operates SoaR Gaming LLC and Eleven Gaming Corp.

Hyman is also an award-winning author of children's literature, under contract with Penguin Random House.

== Early and personal life ==
Hyman was born on June 9, 1992, in Toronto, Ontario, to an Ashkenazi Jewish family. He grew up in the Forest Hill neighbourhood with his parents Stuart and Vicky Hyman, four brothers: Spencer, Oliver, Cooper and Shane. Hyman's father Stuart is the Chairman and Governor of the Markham Royals and the Chairman of the Ontario Junior Hockey League (OJHL). Zach's younger brother Spencer is the COO and General Manager of the Brantford Bulldogs Ontario Hockey League (OHL) and the President of Hockey Operations of the Markham Royals (OJHL). His younger brother Oliver played for the Hamilton Red Wings from 2011 to 2013. Hyman attended United Synagogue Day School and graduated with honours from a Jewish high school, the Community Hebrew Academy of Toronto.

Hyman volunteers much of his free time in the community and is an athlete ambassador for children's charities such as Right To Play and First Book Canada.

Every summer, Hyman hosts a celebrity charity golf tournament to raise money for charities in Edmonton and Toronto, including the SickKids Hospital in Toronto.

Hyman and his wife Alannah Mozes, a lawyer, have three sons together.

== Playing career ==
=== Junior ===
Hyman played for the Hamilton Red Wings from 2008 to 2011. His father, Stuart Hyman, had purchased the club in 2003, and was the team's Owner and Governor. During his rookie season, Zach Hyman recorded 13 goals and 24 assists in 49 regular season games, and two goals in five playoff games. He was named the Red Wings' Rookie of the Year. During his sophomore season, Hyman was voted team captain. He recorded 35 goals and 40 assists in 49 regular season games, and seven goals and nine assists in 11 playoff games.

During his final season of Junior A hockey, Hyman was the leading scorer for the Red Wings, recording 42 goals and 60 assists in 43 regular season games, and three goals and five assists in seven playoff games. Hyman ranked second in the Canadian Junior Hockey League (CJHL) in scoring, recording 102 points in 43 games, and led all players with 2.37 points per game.

Following an outstanding season with the Red Wings, Hyman was named to the OJHL's North-West Conference First All-Star Team, and Hockey Canada awarded him the CJHL Player of the Year Award. He became just the second player from the OJHL to win the award, following Trent Walford in 1995–96. In 2010, Hyman was chosen as the OJHL's Most Gentlemanly Player. A two-time Red Wings' MVP, the OHA also selected him as the BJ Monroe Trophy recipient. The award recognized Zach Hyman as the Association's Top Pro Prospect. At the conclusion of the 2010–11 season, Hyman's jersey was displayed in the Hockey Hall of Fame.

=== College ===
Hyman originally committed to play ice hockey for Princeton University during the 2010–11 season. However, he decommitted after Princeton Tigers head coach Guy Gadowsky left the school to start the Division I hockey program at Pennsylvania State University. Following Gadowsky to Penn State was not an option, as the program did not have a varsity team at the time. In May 2011, Hyman was offered an athletic scholarship and committed to play for the University of Michigan for the 2011–12 season.

During his freshman season for the Michigan Wolverines, Hyman recorded 2 goals and 7 assists in 41 games. He scored his first career goal on October 21, 2011, in a game against Northern Michigan University. In his sophomore season, he recorded 4 goals and 5 assists in 38 games. During his junior season, he recorded 7 goals and 10 assists in 35 games. Hyman was selected as the 2014 Bates/Deskins Award Winner, an honour bestowed upon the University of Michigan's Top Junior Student Athlete.

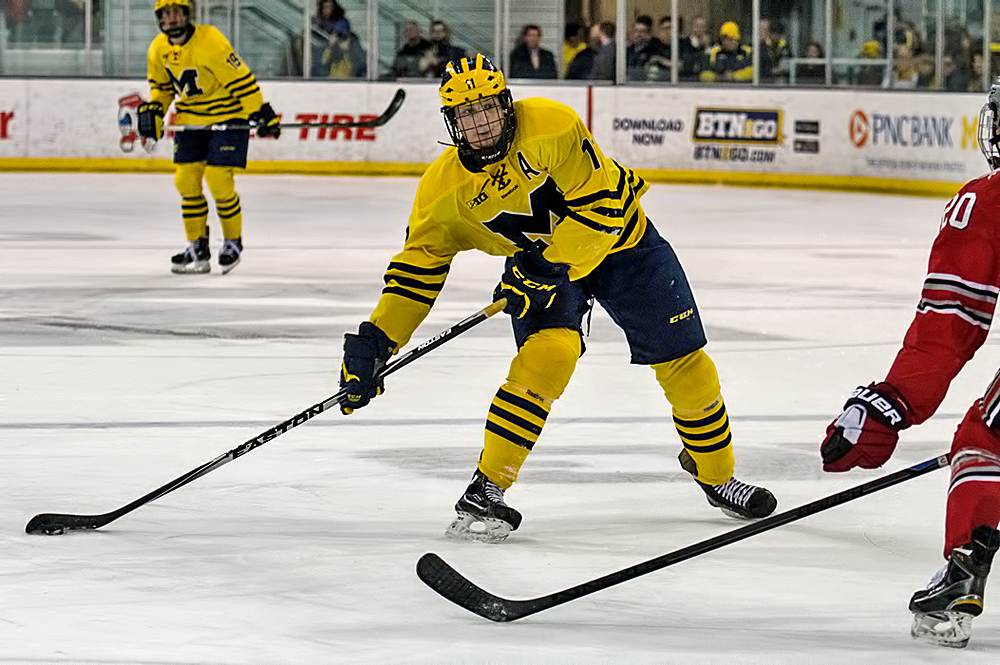
Hyman with the Wolverines during his final year at the University of Michigan

In his senior season, Hyman was named alternate captain. He was Michigan's leading scorer, and the Big Ten Scoring Champion, setting a new record with 54 points, scoring 22 goals and 32 assists in only 37 games. Hyman became the first Michigan player to record 20 goals in a season since Louie Caporusso, and the first player to record 50 points or more since Carl Hagelin during the 2009–10 season. Hyman led the team with 17 multiple-point games, including six games with three or more points. On October 24, 2014, Hyman recorded a career-high five points, and his first career hat-trick against the University of Massachusetts Lowell.

In December 2014, Hyman was named to the 50th Great Lakes Invitational Tournament team, where he scored both game-winning goals against Michigan Technological University and Michigan State University to help lead Michigan to its 16th tournament title.

Following an outstanding senior season with the Wolverines, Hyman was named to the 2014–15 All-Big Ten First Team, and named an AHCA First Team All-American. Hyman was also named a top-ten finalist for the Hobey Baker Award. He was also selected as the SB Nation College Hockey Big Ten Media Most Valuable Player.

On March 27, 2015, Hyman received the 2015 All-American Athlete Award by The National Strength and Conditioning Association (NCSA) and EAS Sports Nutrition. The award recognized Hyman's athletic accomplishments and his dedication to strength and conditioning.

In a national awards ceremony at the Atlanta History Center on April 27, 2015, Hyman was honoured as one of five finalists for the 11th Annual Coach Wooden Citizenship Cup Award, and was recognized as one of the most outstanding role models among athletes.

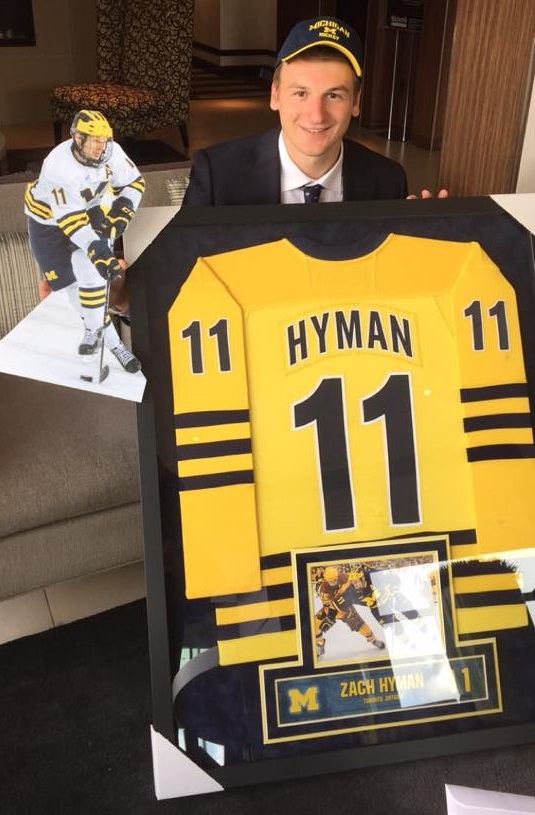
Hyman at the 2015 Michigan Hockey Awards Banquet

Hyman graduated from Michigan with a history major in the College of Literature, Science, and the Arts. He was a three-time Big Ten All-Academic selection and a two-time recipient of the Big Ten Distinguished Scholar Award, having earned a minimum grade point average (GPA) of 3.7 or higher for the previous academic year.

On May 4, 2015, Hyman was selected as a Senior Athlete of the Year Award winner for the 2014–15 season at Michigan's Bob Ufer Quarterback Club's Annual Banquet, an award previously won by former standout Michigan quarterbacks Jim Harbaugh in 1987 and Tom Brady in 2000. Past recipients include Heisman Trophy winner Desmond Howard in 1992, Brian Wiseman in 1994, Marty Turco in 1998, T. J. Hensick in 2007, Kevin Porter in 2008 and Carl Hagelin in 2011.

On May 14, 2015, Hyman was part of a quartet of University of Michigan student-athletes who were named Capital One First Team Academic All-District selections, the announcement coming from the College Sports Information Directors of America (CoSIDA), and his name was put forward for Academic All-American consideration. On June 11, 2015, Hyman was named to the 2015 Capital One Academic All-America Division I Men's At-Large team, as selected by CoSIDA. Hyman was the second ice hockey player at Michigan to be named an Academic All-America honoree, following Jeff Jillson in 2001, and the first to be named First Team Academic All American.

On June 22, 2015, the University of Michigan Athletic Department named Hyman the 2014–15 Michigan Athlete of the Year. Hyman was the third ice hockey player to receive the honour, following Brendan Morrison in 1997 and Kevin Porter in 2008.

=== Professional ===
Hyman was drafted 123rd overall by the Florida Panthers in the 2010 NHL entry draft. At the conclusion of his college career, the Panthers offered Hyman an NHL contract, but Hyman announced his intent not to sign with the Panthers, and opted for free agency.

==== Toronto Maple Leafs (2015–2021) ====
On June 19, 2015, Hyman's playing rights were acquired by the Toronto Maple Leafs from the Florida Panthers in exchange for centre Greg McKegg and a conditional draft pick (conditions not met), ahead of his planned July 1, 2015, free agency. On June 23, Hyman signed a two-year, entry-level contract with Toronto.

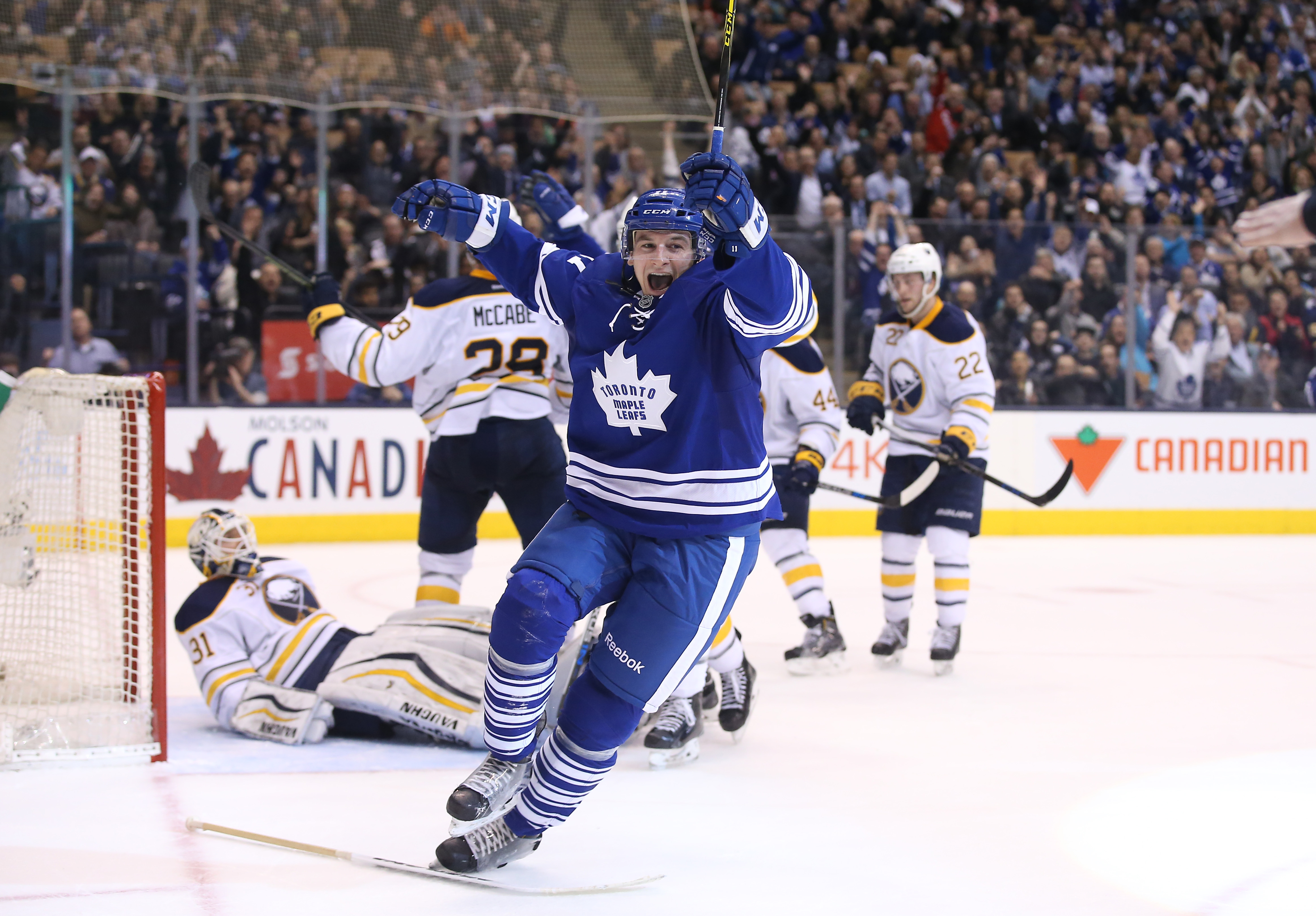
Hyman after scoring the first goal of his NHL career, against Chad Johnson, on March 7, 2016

Hyman made his professional debut for the Maple Leafs' American Hockey League (AHL) affiliate, the Toronto Marlies, on October 9, 2015, where he recorded his first professional point, an assist on a Byron Froese goal in the second period. On November 7, Hyman recorded his first professional goal, a short-handed goal against Matt O'Connor of the Binghamton Senators.

On February 29, 2016, Hyman was recalled by the Toronto Maple Leafs. Prior to being recalled, he recorded 13 goals and 20 assists in 54 games for the Marlies that season and led the AHL in short-handed goals. He made his NHL debut in a game against the Tampa Bay Lightning later that night, recording 15:58 of ice time, 22 shifts, two shots and one hit. He scored his first career NHL goal one week later on March 7 against Chad Johnson of the Buffalo Sabres.

On March 31, 2016, Hyman was loaned to the Marlies in preparation for the AHL Calder Cup playoffs. Considered favourites to win the Calder Cup championship, the team was eliminated in the third round. Hyman contributed 6 points in the team's 15-game run. Hyman played every game despite suffering an injury (broken nose) in a game against the Hershey Bears.

On October 11, 2016, Hyman earned a permanent spot on the big club, and he was included on the 2016–17 regular season 100th Anniversary Centennial team opening day roster for the Toronto Maple Leafs. He dressed for the season opener on October 12, against the Ottawa Senators, on a line with fellow rookies Auston Matthews and William Nylander. In the first period of play, Hyman assisted on Auston Matthews' first-ever NHL goal.

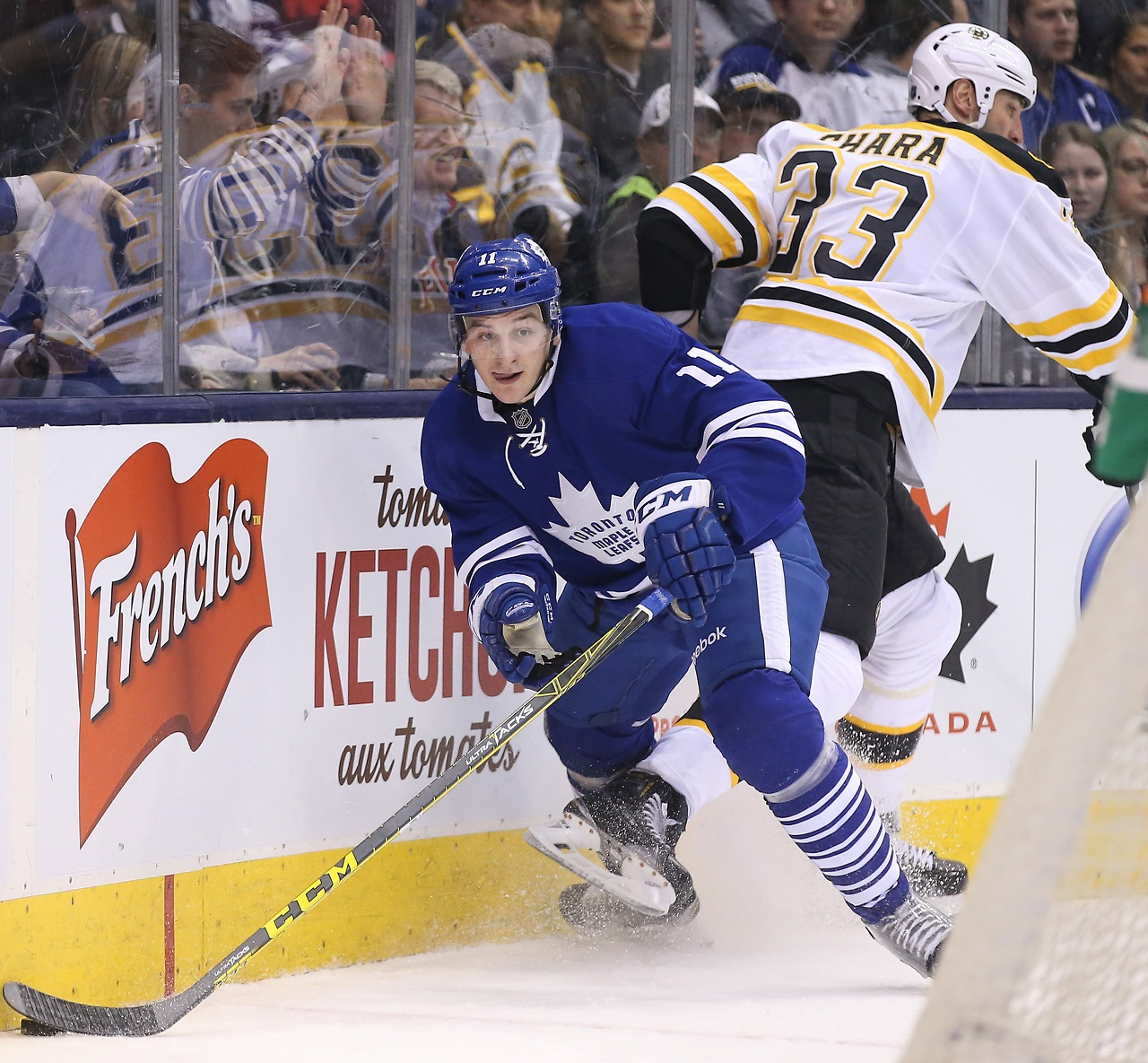
Hyman taking the puck from Zdeno Chára on March 26, 2016

During the 2016–17 season a number of Toronto Maple Leafs team records were either tied or broken by Hyman. On February 6, 2017, Hyman scored his third short-handed goal of the season, surpassing the previous Maple Leafs record for number of short-handed goals scored by a rookie which had been held by Gus Mortson since 1946–47. At six games with an assist, Hyman also tied for the most consecutive games with an assist by a rookie with Dan Daoust, Bob Nevin, and Frank Nigro. On March 28, 2017, when playing the Florida Panthers, Hyman set the Toronto Maple Leafs record for most short-handed goals in a single season by a rookie with four.

On March 15, 2016, Hyman scored his first multi-point game. On October 7, 2017, he recorded another multi-point game with two points in an 8–5 victory over the New York Rangers.

On July 5, 2017, Hyman signed a four-year, $9 million contract extension with the Maple Leafs.

Hyman skated on the Maple Leafs' top line during the 2017–18 season. He recorded career-highs in goals, and assist and points. On December 29, 2017, Hyman scored his fifth career shorthanded goal. The goal is the third-most by a Maple Leafs' player during their first three NHL season, behind only Rick Vaive (seven) and Lanny McDonald (six). The Maple Leafs qualified for the postseason for a second straight year, falling in the first round in seven games to the Boston Bruins.

Hyman missed the beginning of the 2019–20 season after recovering from Anterior cruciate ligament (ACL) surgery. He made his season debut on November 13 in a 5–4 loss to the New York Islanders. Hyman finished the season scoring 21 goals and 37 points in just 51 games.

Hyman was named an Alternate Captain for the Toronto Maple Leafs prior to the start of the 2020–21 season.

==== Edmonton Oilers (2021–present) ====
Following the end of his RFA contract, Hyman initially hoped to remain in Toronto with the Maple Leafs. However, after preliminary negotiations it became clear that the team's salary cap considerations put a deal out of reach. Following that, he entered into negotiations with the Edmonton Oilers. On July 28, 2021, Hyman signed a seven-year, $38.5 million contract with the Oilers. Hyman cited the opportunity to play with stars like Connor McDavid and Leon Draisaitl as one of the biggest draws of the team on signing.

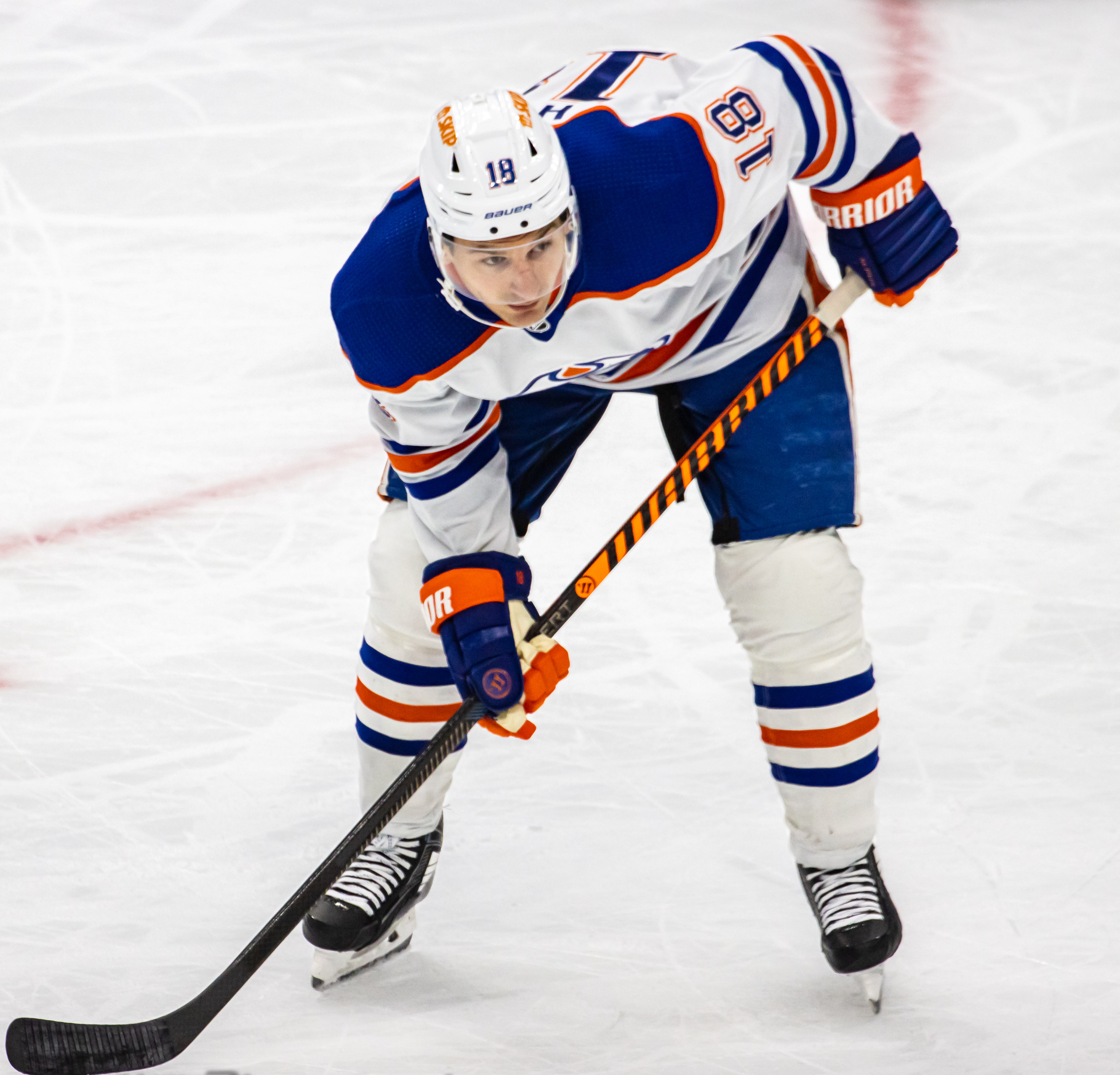
Hyman with the Edmonton Oilers in 2023

Making his debut with the Oilers in the October 15 season opener against the Vancouver Canucks, Hyman scored a power play goal. Hyman scored 11 goals and 8 assists in his first 26 games, before missing three games after a minor shoulder injury resulting from an altercation with Carolina Hurricanes defenceman Brady Skjei. One of the games he missed was against the Leafs, to his disappointment, before the league itself took a pause as a result of the Omicron variant. After an excellent start to the season for the Oilers, they began suffering a marked decline in results, culminating in a 2–11–2 stretch of games in December and January. By early February they had dropped out of a playoff spot. Amidst extensive media discussion of the Oilers' lack of depth scoring and questionable goaltending, general manager Ken Holland fired coach Dave Tippett and replaced him with Jay Woodcroft, previously the coach of the Oilers' AHL affiliate, the Bakersfield Condors. Woodcroft's early experimentation with the lineup included playing Hyman more on the top lines with McDavid and Draisaitl. The Oilers recovered their form under Woodcroft, finishing the season in second place in the Pacific Division to qualify for the playoffs after posting the third-best points percentage in the league after the coaching change with a 26–9–3 record. Hyman had a career best regular season with 27 goals and 27 assists. The Oilers faced the Los Angeles Kings in the first round of the 2022 Stanley Cup playoffs, winning the series in seven games and allowing Hyman to advance to the second round for the first time in his career. The Oilers drew the Calgary Flames in the second round, the first playoff "Battle of Alberta" in 31 years. Hyman had an outstanding series, scoring 6 goals and 8 points in 5 games, setting a franchise record being the only Oiler to score a goal in every game of a playoff series. The Oilers advanced to the Western Conference Finals, meeting the top-seeded Colorado Avalanche, where the Oilers were swept.

In the 2022–23 season he achieved a career high 83 points, and in 2023–24 he scored a career-high 54 goals and only the 100th player in NHL history to score more than 50 goals in the regular season. Hyman went on to score 16 more goals in the playoffs and set the league record for most (16) goals in a single postseason by any active player. Hyman finished the 2023–24 regular season and playoffs as the NHL's goal-scoring leader with 70 goals. He was instrumental in the Oilers' success that season as Edmonton stormed back from an 0–3 start in the Stanley Cup Final against the Florida Panthers.

On March 26, 2025, in a game versus the Dallas Stars, Hyman wore an "A" on his jersey for the Oilers.

In the 2025 Stanley Cup playoffs, Hyman dislocated his wrist in game 4 of the third round against the Dallas Stars. He did not play for the remainder of the playoffs. The Oilers went on to rematch the Florida Panthers in the Stanley Cup Final, this time losing in 6 games. Despite missing the entire final round, Hyman still led the league in postseason hits, with 111 in 15 games. In the entire regular season, he had 59 hits in 73 games.

Due to his injury against Dallas, Hyman missed the beginning of the 2025–26 season. During that time, the Oilers went 8–7–4. He played his first game of the season on November 15, 2025, in which he had one assist and 11 hits. His 11 hits were, at the time, the fourth most in a game by an Oiler ever.

Hyman scored his 6th career hat-trick on December 11, 2025 against the Detroit Red Wings in a 4-1 win, passing Oilers Hall of Fame member Ryan Smyth and Esa Tikkanen for 7th all-time with the club.

On December 16, 2025, Hyman scored the first goal of an eventual 6-4 win over the Pittsburgh Penguins, providing teammate Leon Draisaitl with the assist he needed for his 1000th career point.

On September 17, 2026, Hyman was named alternate captain for the Oilers, replacing Darnell Nurse.

== International play ==
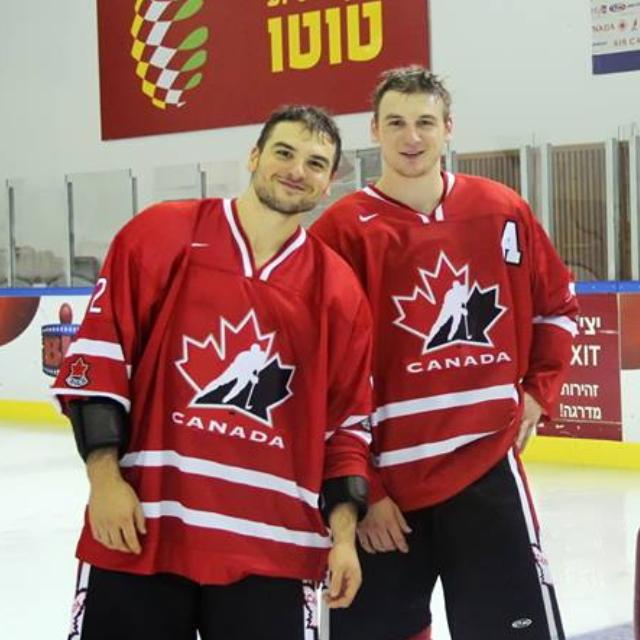
- Hyman (right) with his brother Spencer, while playing for Canada during the 2013 Maccabiah Games

Medal record

Men's ice hockey

Representing Canada

World Junior A Challenge
Silver medal – second place	2010 Penticton	

Maccabiah Games
Gold medal – first place	2013 Israel	

In 2010, as a 17-year-old underage player, Hyman served as assistant captain and represented Canada in the U20 Three Nations tournament in Norrtälje, Sweden. He was named game MVP against Finland, after scoring two goals in the game. He finished the tournament with three goals and one assist in four games.

Hyman represented Canada East at the 2010 World Junior A Challenge. He was named MVP of the game against Russia. He was one of the tournament's leading scorers recording two goals and three assists in five games, and won a silver medal.

In July 2013, Hyman served as an alternate captain representing Canada at the 2013 Maccabiah Games held in Israel, where he recorded three goals and three assists in two games and won a gold medal.

== Career statistics ==
=== Regular season and playoffs ===
Bold indicates led league.

			Regular season					Playoffs
Season	Team	League	GP	G	A	Pts	PIM	GP	G	A	Pts	PIM
2008–09	Hamilton Red Wings	OJHL	49	13	24	37	24	—	—	—	—	—
2009–10	Hamilton Red Wings	OJHL	49	35	40	75	30	—	—	—	—	—
2010–11	Hamilton Red Wings	OJHL	43	42	60	102	24	7	3	5	8	6
2011–12	University of Michigan	CCHA	41	2	7	9	12	—	—	—	—	—
2012–13	University of Michigan	CCHA	38	4	5	9	8	—	—	—	—	—
2013–14	University of Michigan	B1G	35	7	10	17	12	—	—	—	—	—
2014–15	University of Michigan	B1G	37	22	32	54	10	—	—	—	—	—
2015–16	Toronto Marlies	AHL	59	15	22	37	24	15	3	3	6	26
2015–16	Toronto Maple Leafs	NHL	16	4	2	6	18	—	—	—	—	—
2016–17	Toronto Maple Leafs	NHL	82	10	18	28	30	6	1	3	4	4
2017–18	Toronto Maple Leafs	NHL	82	15	25	40	37	7	1	3	4	4
2018–19	Toronto Maple Leafs	NHL	71	21	20	41	65	7	1	0	1	2
2019–20	Toronto Maple Leafs	NHL	51	21	16	37	23	5	1	2	3	0
2020–21	Toronto Maple Leafs	NHL	43	15	18	33	28	7	1	0	1	4
2021–22	Edmonton Oilers	NHL	76	27	27	54	36	16	11	5	16	4
2022–23	Edmonton Oilers	NHL	79	36	47	83	39	12	3	8	11	12
2023–24	Edmonton Oilers	NHL	80	54	23	77	48	25	**16**	6	22	12
2024–25	Edmonton Oilers	NHL	73	27	17	44	32	15	5	6	11	6
2025–26	Edmonton Oilers	NHL	58	31	21	52	28	6	2	0	2	6
NHL totals			711	261	234	495	384	106	42	33	75	54

=== International ===
Year	Team	Event	Result	GP	G	A	Pts	PIM
2010	Canada East	WJAC	2nd place, silver medalist(s)	5	2	3	5	4
2013	Canada	Maccabiah Games	1st place, gold medalist(s)	2	3	3	6	0
International totals				7	5	6	11	4

== Awards and achievements ==
Award / Achievement	Year	Ref
OJHL
OJHL North-West Conference First All-Star Team	2011	
OJHL BJ Monroe Trophy	2011	
OJHL Most Gentlemanly Player	2011	
CJHL
CJHL Player of the Year	2011	
College
Bates/Deskins Award Winner	2014	
GLI All-Tournament Team	2014	
All-Big Ten First Team	2015	
AHCA West First-Team All-American	2015	
Big Ten Scoring Champion	2015	
Big Ten All-Tournament Team	2015	
Capital One First Team Academic All-District Selection	2015	
Capital One Academic All-America Division I Men's At-Large Team	2015	
University of Michigan Athlete of the Year	2015	
NSCA All-American Strength and Conditioning Athlete of the Year	2015	
Joseph E. Barss Award "True Team Player"	2015	
Hal Downes Trophy "Most Valuable Player"	2015	
Doc Losh Trophy "Scoring Leader"	2015	
Carl Isaacson Trophy "Best Student Athlete"	2015	

== NHL records ==
=== NHL ===
- Most goals in a single postseason in the salary cap era (16, in 2024)

=== Toronto Maple Leafs ===
- Most short-handed goals by a rookie (4)
- Most consecutive games with an assist by a rookie (6) (tied with three other players)
- Most empty net goals in a season (6)

=== Edmonton Oilers ===
- Only player to score a goal in every playoff game of a series (2022, against the Calgary Flames)
- Longest home goal-streak in Oilers history (10 games, tied with Wayne Gretzky)
- Most goals through the first three games of the playoffs (6, tied with Jari Kurri)
- Most goals through six playoff games (9, tied with Mark Messier, stands second all-time to Newsy Lalonde)

== Writing career ==
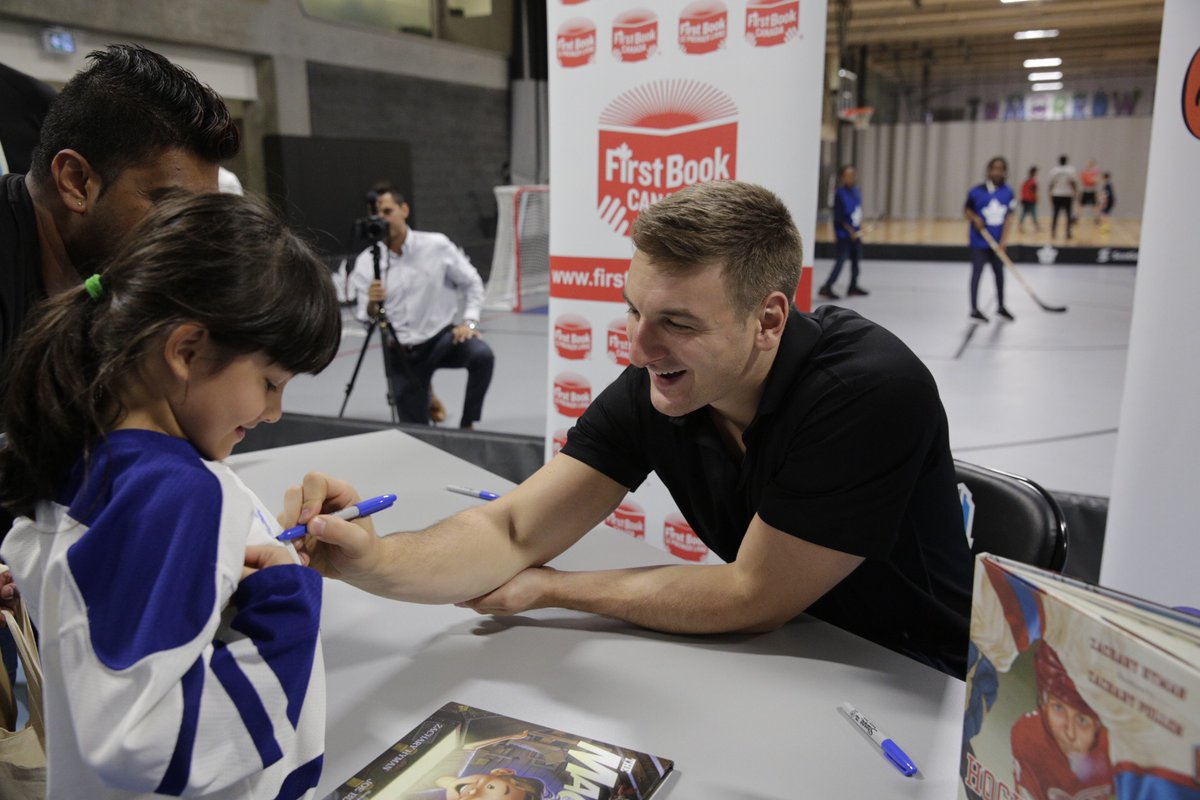
Hyman signing a book and a Maple Leafs jersey for a young reader

Hyman is also a best-selling author under contract with Penguin Random House.

His award-winning children's book The Bambino and Me which earned a starred Kirkus Review, conjures 1920s New York, and tells the story of a young Yankees fan named George, who especially admires Babe Ruth and carries his baseball card everywhere. His second book, Hockey Hero was released in October 2015 and is about a shy hockey player who overcomes playing in his brother's shadow and eventually makes his dream come true.

His latest book, The Magician's Secret, illustrated by Joe Bluhm, was released on April 3, 2018. This book features the adventures of Charlie as he listens to tales from his grandfather which have been saved in his Magic Story Chest. Charlie comes to learn that believing in dreams can make them become reality. The Magician's Secret was also nominated for the 2019 Blue Spruce Award by the Ontario Library Association.

He is currently working on a fourth children's book for Penguin Random House, possibly about basketball.

== See also ==
- List of select Jewish ice hockey players

Awards and achievements
Preceded by Award created	Big Ten Scoring Champion; 2014–15	Succeeded by Kyle Connor
