= Robin Dahse =

Swedish professional ice hockey player

- Born: April 30, 1992 (age 33) Malmö, Sweden
- Height: 6 ft 0 in (183 cm)
- Weight: 179 lb (81 kg; 12 st 11 lb)
- Position: Winger
- Shoots: Left
- GET team Former teams: Sparta Warriors; Frölunda HC; Växjö Lakers; Halmstad Hammers HC; IK Pantern; Malmö Redhawks
- Playing career: 2011–present

Robin Dahse (born April 30, 1992) is a Swedish professional ice hockey player. He plays with Sparta Warriors in the Norwegian GET-ligaen.
