= Scott Mayfield =

American ice hockey player (born 1992)

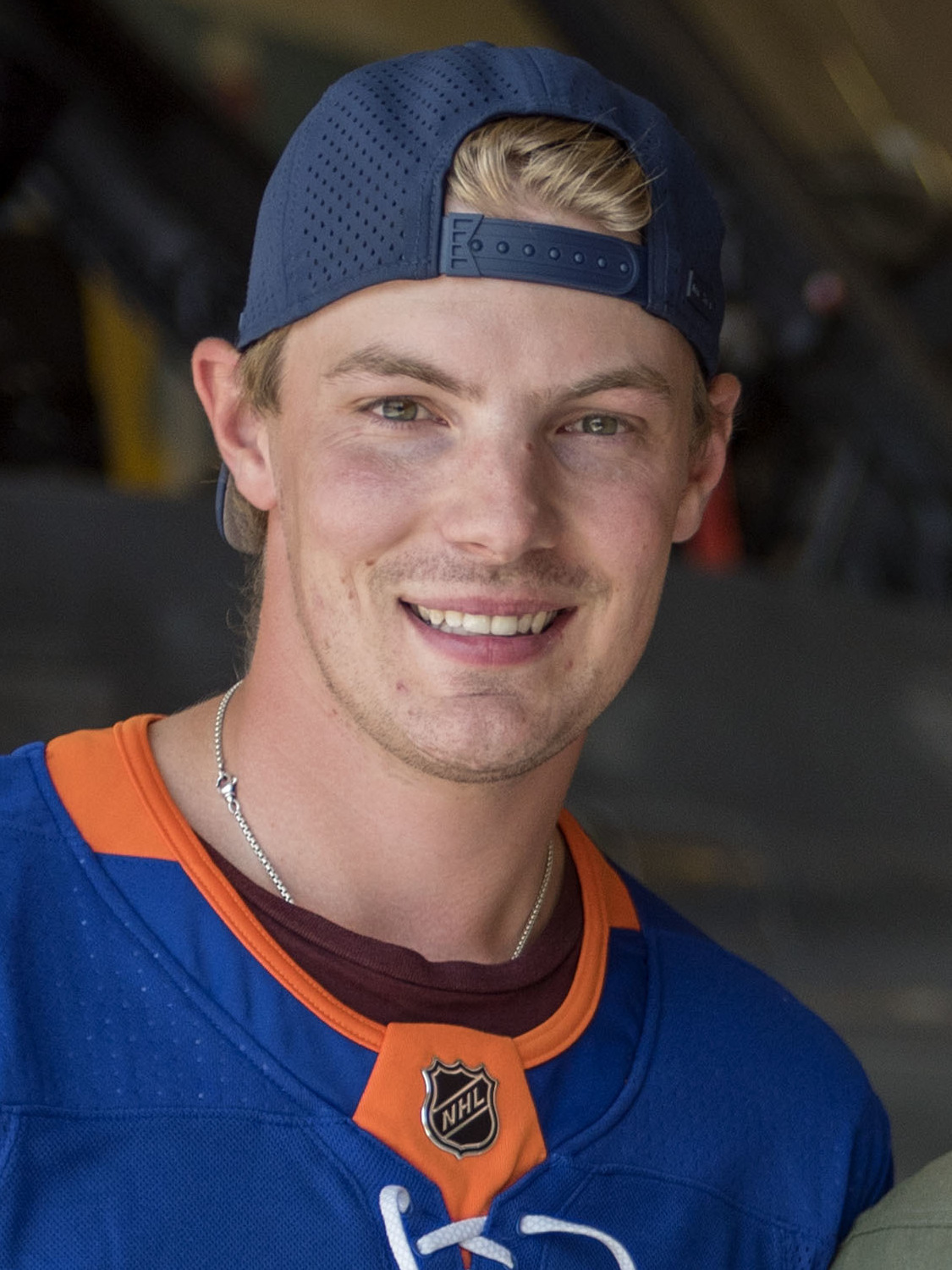
- Mayfield with the New York Islanders in 2021
- Born: October 14, 1992 (age 33) St. Louis, Missouri, U.S.
- Height: 6 ft 4 in (193 cm)
- Weight: 205 lb (93 kg; 14 st 9 lb)
- Position: Defense
- Shoots: Right
- NHL team: New York Islanders
- NHL draft: 34th overall, 2011; New York Islanders
- Playing career: 2013–present

Scott Mayfield (born October 14, 1992) is an American professional ice hockey player who is a defenseman for the New York Islanders of the National Hockey League (NHL). Mayfield was selected by the Islanders in the second round, 34th overall, of the 2011 NHL entry draft.

== Early life ==
Mayfield was born on October 14, 1992, in St. Louis, to parents Jane and Andy. He is the middle child of three siblings between older brother Patrick and younger sister Sarah. His parents met while attending the University of Northern Colorado; his father later attended law school at the University of Denver. Due to his parents' background in Colorado, he grew up rooting for the Denver Broncos. Mayfield learned how to skate while growing up in Webster Groves, Missouri.

== Playing career ==
Growing up in Missouri, Mayfield played three years of junior varsity ice hockey at Webster Groves High School. While competing with the 18U AAA St. Louis Amateur Blues, Mayfield won the overall skills competition of a 2009 national tournament. As such, he was invited to a United States junior team development camp, where he was named the top defenseman and invited to play in the 2009 Ivan Hlinka Memorial Tournament. Following the tournament, Mayfield began to garner attention from scouts and he was drafted by the Indiana Ice of the United States Hockey League (USHL). He was later traded to the Youngstown Phantoms and subsequently became the youngest player in the league. Prior to starting his USHL career, Mayfield committed to play for the University of Denver Pioneers which compete in the Western Collegiate Hockey Association (WCHA).

Upon joining the Phantoms for his rookie season, Mayfield struggled to match the speed of the game but eventually tallied 22 points and 145 penalty minutes through 59 games. During the 2010–11 season, Mayfield was invited to participate in the NHL Research, Development and Orientation Camp and played for Team USA at the 2010 World Junior A Challenge. He tallied one assists and four penalty minutes throughout the tournament to help them win a gold medal. As a result of his defensive plays, Mayfield was named to the All-Tournament team and the MVP. In his final season with the Phantoms, Mayfield was also elected to the 2010–11 USHL Eastern Conference All-Star team.

=== Collegiate ===
Following his final USHL season, Mayfield earned a final ranking of 24th amongst North American skaters from the NHL Central Scouting Bureau. As such, he was invited to participate in the 2011 NHL draft combine where he placed in the top 10 in eight events including the Vertec test and Hand Eye Coordination test. Mayfield was eventually selected in the second round, 34th overall, by the New York Islanders in the 2011 NHL entry draft.

Mayfield played two seasons for the Denver Pioneers, tallying 29 points through 81 games. He helped the Pioneers make two NCAA tournament appearances and was selected for the NCAA All-Academic team in 2013. He concluded his collegiate career by signing a three-year, entry-level contract with the Islanders on April 5, and subsequently joined their American Hockey League (AHL) affiliate, the Bridgeport Sound Tigers, on an amateur tryout (ATO) contract.

=== Professional ===
Mayfield joined the Sound Tigers to conclude their 2012–13 season. He played in six games and accumulates no points and two penalty minutes. Following this, he attended the Islanders' 2013 training camp before being loaned back to the Sound Tigers. On April 6, 2014, Mayfield made his NHL debut with the Islanders in a 4–0 loss to the Columbus Blue Jackets. While wearing jersey number 42, Mayfield played 17:04 minutes of ice time and recorded two shots and four hits. The following game, Mayfield was one of 10 Islanders rookies to be part of the lineup. He remained with the Islanders until the conclusion of the season when he was one of six skaters returned to the Sound Tigers.

After making his NHL debut the previous season, Mayfield spent his second full professional campaign with the Sound Tigers. He tallied 14 points through 69 games before joining the Islanders for their postseason run. Upon joining the Islanders, Mayfield was entered into the lineup for Game 6 against the Washington Capitals. In his first postseason game of the season, Mayfield played 10:30 minutes of ice time which increased in Game 7 to 14:20. Once the Islanders were eliminated from the playoffs, Mayfield began his off-season training which included boxing and mixed martial arts training. He specifically focused on improving his quick first step and agility.

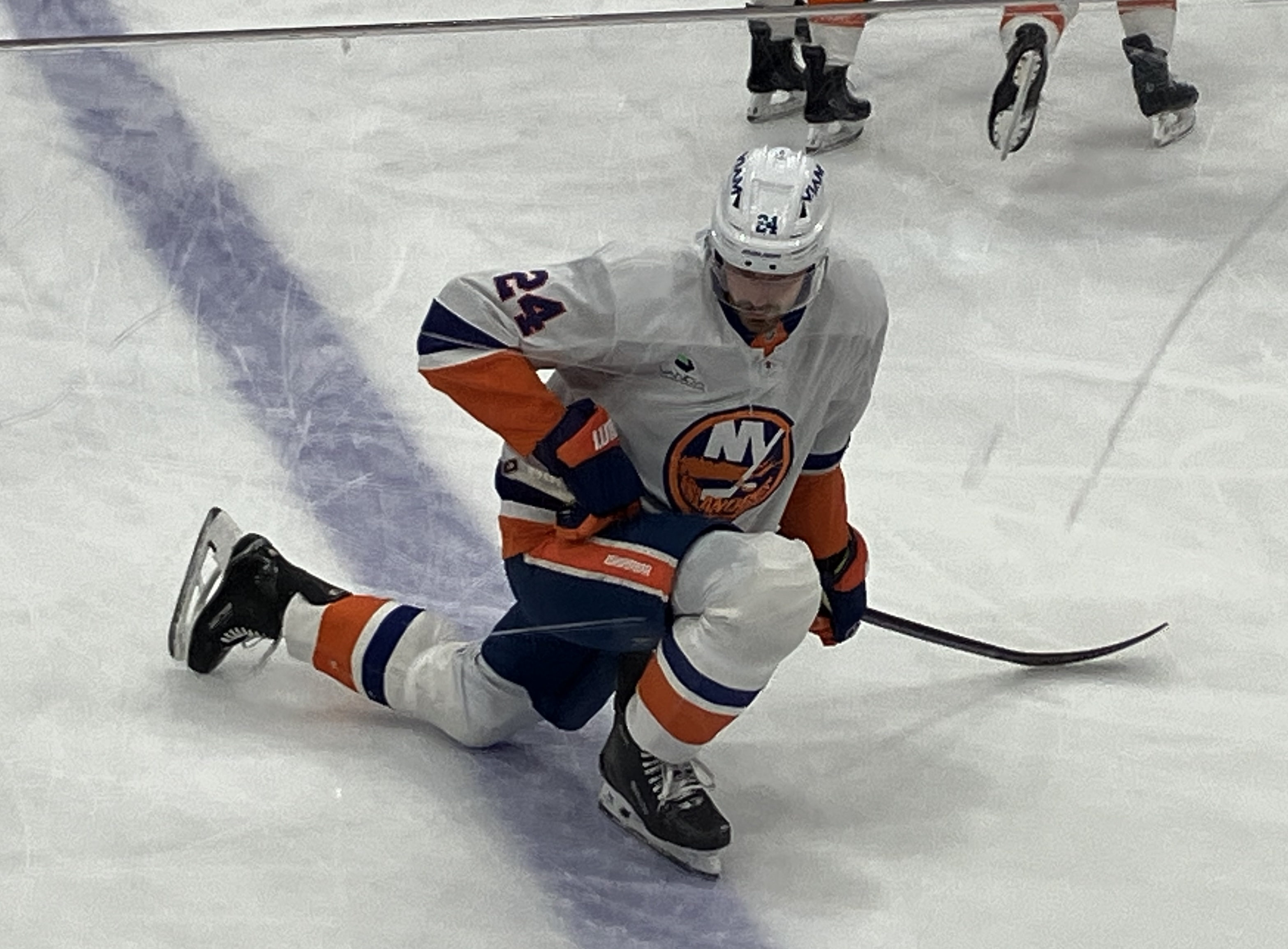
Mayfield in 2026

Despite his off-season training, Mayfield was returned to the Sound Tigers to begin his third full professional campaign. By January 2016, as injuries plagued the Islanders lineup, Mayfield earned his first NHL recall of the season. At the time of the recall, he had tallied three goals and two assists through 35 games. On April 9, Mayfield scored his first NHL goal in a 4–3 overtime loss against the Buffalo Sabres to help the Islanders qualify for the 2016 Stanley Cup playoffs.

Mayfield received his first recall of the 2016–17 season on November 14, 2016, after an injury to defenseman Dennis Seidenberg.

After appearing in a career-high 29 regular season games with the Islanders, tallying 10 points, and leading the team in penalty minutes, Mayfield signed a five-year, $7.25-million contract extension with the team on January 4, 2018. Following the signing, Mayfield accumulated two more points before suffering a lower-body injury during a 5–4 overtime loss to the Nashville Predators on February 6. It was later announced that he was expected to miss four weeks to recover.

On July 1, 2023, Mayfield signed a seven-year, $24.5 million contract extension with the Islanders. During the 2023–24 season Mayfield recorded five assists in 41 games before suffering a season-ending injury on February 22, 2024.

== Personal life ==
Mayfield's older brother, Patrick, is a Major in the United States Air Force, and his younger sister Sarah is an interior designer. Patrick was honored as one of the "Military Heroes of the Game" at an Islanders game in February 2020. He proposed to his fiancé in 2019 while rehabbing his ankle injury, and they planned on marrying in 2020. However, due to the COVID-19 pandemic, their wedding was delayed.

== Career statistics ==
=== Regular season and playoffs ===
			Regular season					Playoffs
Season	Team	League	GP	G	A	Pts	PIM	GP	G	A	Pts	PIM
2008–09	St. Louis Amateur Blues	18U AAA	62	10	20	30	84	—	—	—	—	—
2009–10	Youngstown Phantoms	USHL	59	10	12	22	145	—	—	—	—	—
2010–11	Youngstown Phantoms	USHL	52	7	9	16	159	—	—	—	—	—
2011–12	University of Denver	WCHA	42	3	9	12	76	—	—	—	—	—
2012–13	University of Denver	WCHA	39	4	13	17	112	—	—	—	—	—
2012–13	Bridgeport Sound Tigers	AHL	6	0	0	0	2	—	—	—	—	—
2013–14	Bridgeport Sound Tigers	AHL	71	3	15	18	129	—	—	—	—	—
2013–14	New York Islanders	NHL	5	0	0	0	7	—	—	—	—	—
2014–15	Bridgeport Sound Tigers	AHL	69	1	13	14	173	—	—	—	—	—
2014–15	New York Islanders	NHL	—	—	—	—	—	2	0	0	0	0
2015–16	Bridgeport Sound Tigers	AHL	54	5	7	12	80	3	0	0	0	6
2015–16	New York Islanders	NHL	6	1	0	1	11	—	—	—	—	—
2016–17	Bridgeport Sound Tigers	AHL	23	3	3	6	27	—	—	—	—	—
2016–17	New York Islanders	NHL	25	2	7	9	35	—	—	—	—	—
2017–18	New York Islanders	NHL	47	2	10	12	45	—	—	—	—	—
2018–19	New York Islanders	NHL	79	4	15	19	68	8	0	2	2	8
2019–20	New York Islanders	NHL	67	5	8	13	53	22	1	4	5	12
2020–21	New York Islanders	NHL	56	2	13	15	38	19	2	4	6	25
2021–22	New York Islanders	NHL	61	3	15	18	55	—	—	—	—	—
2022–23	New York Islanders	NHL	82	6	18	24	83	6	1	2	3	2
2023–24	New York Islanders	NHL	41	0	5	5	35	—	—	—	—	—
2024–25	New York Islanders	NHL	66	3	6	9	27	—	—	—	—	—
2025–26	New York Islanders	NHL	80	2	13	15	83	—	—	—	—	—
NHL totals			615	30	110	140	540	57	4	12	16	47

=== International ===
Year	Team	Event	GP	G	A	Pts	PIM
2009	United States	IH18	4	0	1	1	4
Junior totals			4	0	1	1	4

== Awards and honors ==
Award	Year	Ref
USHL
All-Star Game	2011	
College
WCHA All-Academic Team	2013	
International
WJAC Tournament MVP	2010	
