= Jordan Schmaltz =

American media personality and former ice hockey player

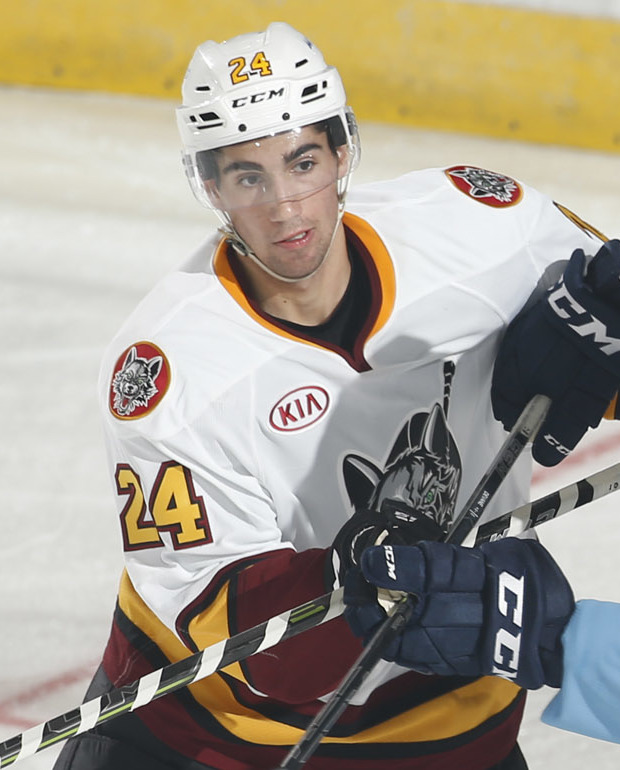
- Schmaltz with the Chicago Wolves in 2015
- Born: October 8, 1993 (age 32) Madison, Wisconsin, U.S.
- Height: 6 ft 2 in (188 cm)
- Weight: 195 lb (88 kg; 13 st 13 lb)
- Position: Defense
- Shot: Right
- Played for: St. Louis Blues; HIFK; EHC Kloten
- NHL draft: 25th overall, 2012; St. Louis Blues
- Playing career: 2015–2022

Jordan “Swish” Schmaltz (born October 8, 1993) is an American former professional ice hockey defenseman. He was drafted 25th overall by the St. Louis Blues in the 2012 NHL entry draft and last played for EHC Kloten of the Swiss National League (NL).

== Playing career ==
Schmaltz played collegiate hockey with the University of North Dakota after playing in the United States Hockey League (USHL) with the Green Bay Gamblers, where he won the 2012 Clark and Anderson Cups. He also received First-Team honors of the USHL. In 2011, he was traded to the Gamblers from the Sioux City Musketeers, where he was named to the 2010–11 USHL All-Rookie Team and also to the USHL First All-Star Team.

Schmaltz spent three seasons playing for the University of North Dakota in the National Collegiate Hockey Conference (NCHC). On May 28, 2015, he announced that he would forgo his final year of NCAA eligibility and signed a three-year, entry-level contract with the St. Louis Blues. He made his NHL debut in a 3–0 win over the Colorado Avalanche on March 5, 2017.

On December 12, 2017, Schmaltz was recalled to the Blues to replace injured captain Alex Pietrangelo. Schmaltz was selected for the 2018 AHL All-Star Game but was unavailable to play. He was replaced by Tucson Roadrunners' defenseman Kyle Capobianco.

On September 13, 2018, Schmaltz signed a two-year contract extension with the Blues.

On July 25, 2019, Schmaltz was traded to the Toronto Maple Leafs in exchange for Andreas Borgman. In the following 2019–20 season, Schmaltz recorded 2 goals and 13 points in 37 games with the Maple Leafs' AHL affiliate, the Toronto Marlies, before he was traded by the Maple Leafs at the NHL trade deadline to the New York Islanders in exchange for Matt Lorito on February 24, 2020. Schmaltz made six appearances with the Bridgeport Sound Tigers before the season was cancelled due to the COVID-19 pandemic.

As a free agent from the Islanders, Schmaltz went unsigned during the break. Approaching the delayed 2020–21 season, Schmaltz accepted a professional tryout invitation to attend the Arizona Coyotes training camp, joining his brother Nick, on December 28, 2020. After his release by the Coyotes following training camp, Schmaltz joined the Tucson Roadrunners on a professional tryout contract.

After six North American professional seasons, Schmaltz opted to sign abroad as a free agent, joining Finnish club, HIFK of the Liiga, on June 16, 2021. After a year in Finland, Schmaltz signed with EHC Kloten of the Swiss NL in February 2022.

== International play ==
Medal record

Ice hockey

Representing the United States

World U-17 Hockey Challenge
Gold medal – first place	2008 London	

World Junior A Challenge
Gold medal – first place	2010 Penticton	

Schmaltz was a member of the gold medal-winning United States team at the 2010 World Junior A Challenge.

== Personal life ==
Schmaltz is the son of Mike and Lisa Schmaltz. He is the older brother of Nick Schmaltz, who was selected 20th overall by the Chicago Blackhawks in the 2014 NHL entry draft. He also has a younger sister, Kylie who plays volleyball for the University of Kentucky.

Schmaltz attended the University of North Dakota and majored in Communication and Social Science. His father and two uncles, Marc and Monte, also attended college there, and lettered in football.

Schmaltz designs golf apparel for his company, Butter Golf.

Schmaltz hosts the podcast "Home By 3" with "Rob Gucci".

== Career statistics ==
=== Regular season and playoffs ===
			Regular season					Playoffs
Season	Team	League	GP	G	A	Pts	PIM	GP	G	A	Pts	PIM
2009–10	Chicago Mission 18U AAA	T1EHL	39	10	21	31	30	—	—	—	—	—
2009–10	U.S. NTDP U17	USDP	11	2	0	2	0	—	—	—	—	—
2009–10	Sioux City Musketeers	USHL	2	0	0	0	4	—	—	—	—	—
2010–11	Sioux City Musketeers	USHL	53	13	31	44	22	3	0	1	1	4
2011–12	Sioux City Musketeers	USHL	9	3	3	6	9	—	—	—	—	—
2011–12	Green Bay Gamblers	USHL	46	7	28	35	20	12	2	5	7	8
2012–13	University of North Dakota	WCHA	42	3	9	12	31	—	—	—	—	—
2013–14	University of North Dakota	NCHC	41	6	18	24	12	—	—	—	—	—
2014–15	University of North Dakota	NCHC	42	4	24	28	8	—	—	—	—	—
2015–16	Chicago Wolves	AHL	71	6	30	36	24	—	—	—	—	—
2016–17	Chicago Wolves	AHL	42	3	22	25	22	8	1	4	5	4
2016–17	St. Louis Blues	NHL	9	0	2	2	4	1	0	0	0	0
2017–18	San Antonio Rampage	AHL	31	5	18	23	20	—	—	—	—	—
2017–18	St. Louis Blues	NHL	13	0	1	1	6	—	—	—	—	—
2018–19	St. Louis Blues	NHL	20	0	2	2	2	—	—	—	—	—
2018–19	San Antonio Rampage	AHL	36	1	8	9	20	—	—	—	—	—
2019–20	Toronto Marlies	AHL	37	2	11	13	24	—	—	—	—	—
2019–20	Bridgeport Sound Tigers	AHL	6	0	1	1	2	—	—	—	—	—
2020–21	Tucson Roadrunners	AHL	30	2	4	6	14	—	—	—	—	—
2021–22	HIFK	Liiga	55	9	24	33	16	5	0	0	0	25
2022–23	EHC Kloten	NL	3	0	0	0	0	—	—	—	—	—
NHL totals			42	0	5	5	12	1	0	0	0	0

=== International ===
Year	Team	Event	Result	GP	G	A	Pts	PIM
2010	United States	U17	1st place, gold medalist(s)	6	1	0	1	0
Junior totals				6	1	0	1	0

== Awards and honors ==
Award	Year
USHL
All-Rookie Team	2010–11
First All-Star Team	2010–11
College
All-NCHC Second Team	2013–14, 2014–15

Awards and achievements
Preceded by Vladimir Tarasenko	St. Louis Blues first-round draft pick 2012	Succeeded by Robby Fabbri
