= Douglas Lögdal =

Swedish ice hockey player

Douglas Logdal
- Born: October 31, 1992 (age 33) Södertälje, Sweden
- Height: 5 ft 9 in (175 cm)
- Weight: 163 lb (74 kg; 11 st 9 lb)
- Position: Centre
- Shoots: Right
- Elitserien team: Timrå IK
- Playing career: 2010–present

Douglas Logdal (born October 31, 1992) is a Swedish professional ice hockey player. He played with Timrå IK in the Elitserien during the 2010–11 Elitserien season.

== Career statistics ==
			Regular season					Playoffs
Season	Team	League	GP	G	A	Pts	PIM	GP	G	A	Pts	PIM
2007–08	Timrå IK J18	J18 Div.1	14	14	10	24	—	—	—	—	—	—
2007–08	Timrå IK J18	J18 Elit	17	4	4	8	2	—	—	—	—	—
2008–09	Timrå IK J18	J18 Elit	18	12	7	19	12	—	—	—	—	—
2008–09	Timrå IK J18	J18 Allsvenskan	14	3	1	4	4	1	1	0	1	0
2009–10	Timrå IK J18	J18 Elit	17	18	15	33	8	—	—	—	—	—
2009–10	Timrå IK J18	J18 Allsvenskan	12	3	6	9	6	5	0	4	4	4
2009–10	Timrå IK J20	J20 SuperElit	22	3	7	10	8	—	—	—	—	—
2010–11	Timrå IK J20	J20 SuperElit	41	14	18	32	18	3	1	0	1	0
2010–11	Timrå IK	Elitserien	1	0	0	0	0	—	—	—	—	—
2011–12	Timrå IK J20	J20 SuperElit	47	20	32	52	14	3	1	2	3	0
2011–12	Timrå IK	Elitserien	5	0	1	1	0	—	—	—	—	—
2012–13	Halmstad HF	Hockeyettan	33	12	11	23	12	2	0	1	1	0
2013–14	Halmstad HF	Hockeyettan	42	12	21	33	12	—	—	—	—	—
2014–15	Halmstad HF	Hockeyettan	36	5	26	31	6	—	—	—	—	—
2015–16	Mariestad BoIS HC	Hockeyettan	33	9	21	30	14	—	—	—	—	—
2016–17	Mariestad BoIS HC	Hockeyettan	40	20	37	57	20	6	3	3	6	0
2017–18	HC Vita Hästen	HockeyAllsvenskan	35	5	10	15	16	—	—	—	—	—
2017–18	Mariestad BoIS HC	Hockeyettan	8	4	3	7	4	6	3	6	9	6
2018–19	Mariestad BoIS HC	Hockeyettan	39	15	14	29	22	3	0	1	1	0
2019–20	Mariestad BoIS HC	Hockeyettan	40	10	29	39	16	4	1	1	2	0
2020–21	Mariestad BoIS HC	Hockeyettan	30	5	17	22	12	12	3	8	11	2
2021–22	Töreboda HF	Division 2	29	12	16	28	6	—	—	—	—	—
2021–22	Mariestad BoIS HC	Hockeyettan	2	0	1	1	0	—	—	—	—	—
Elitserien totals			6	0	1	1	0	—	—	—	—	—
HockeyAllsvenskan totals			35	5	10	15	16	—	—	—	—	—
Hockeyettan totals			303	92	180	272	118	33	10	20	30	8
