= Per Harrysson =

Swedish footballer

Personal information
- Full name: Hans Per Stefan Harrysson
- Date of birth: 20 February 1967 (age 59)
- Place of birth: Åhus, Sweden
- Height: 1.86 m (6 ft 1 in)
- Position: Forward

Senior career*
Years	Team	Apps	(Gls)
1987	Malmö FF	1	(1)
1990–1991	AIK		
1992–1994	Landskrona BoIS		
1995–1997	Mjällby AIF		

Managerial career
- 2021–: IFK Malmö
- * Club domestic league appearances and goals

Per Harrysson (born 20 February 1967) is a Swedish former footballer who played as a forward.
