= 2009–10 OJAHL season =

- League: Ontario Junior A Hockey League
- Sport: Hockey
- Duration: Regular season 2009-09-09 – 2010-02-21; Playoffs; 2010-02-22 – 2010-03-31
- Teams: 15
- Finals champions: Oakville Blades

OJAHL seasons
- ← 2008–09 OJHL 2010-11 OJHL →

The 2009–10 OJAHL season is the first and only season of the Ontario Junior A Hockey League (OJAHL). The 15 teams of the OJAHL competed in 56 regular season games, the top eight teams in the league competed in the playoffs for the league championship.

The OJAHL's playoff champion played against the Central Canadian Hockey League's champion for the Buckland Cup. The champion of that series played for the Dudley Hewitt Cup against the Northern Ontario Junior Hockey League and Superior International Junior Hockey League champions for the right to attend the 2010 Royal Bank Cup.

== Changes ==
- OJHL is dissolved. Teams not in Central Division form Ontario Conference.
- Ontario Conference is renamed Ontario Junior A Hockey League.
- Port Hope Predators of the former OJHL are now Trenton Golden Hawks.

== Current Standings ==
Note: GP = Games played; W = Wins; L = Losses; OTL = Overtime losses; SL = Shootout losses; GF = Goals for; GA = Goals against; PTS = Points; x = clinched playoff berth; y = clinched division title; z = clinched conference title

Teams
| Team | Centre | W–L–OTL–SOL | GF–GA | Points |
|---|---|---|---|---|
| x-Kingston Voyageurs | Kingston | 46-5-2-3 | 274-133 | 97 |
| x-Oakville Blades | Oakville | 46-9-0-1 | 280-137 | 93 |
| x-Georgetown Raiders | Georgetown | 41-10-2-3 | 269-144 | 87 |
| x-Trenton Golden Hawks | Trenton | 35-18-1-2 | 241-190 | 73 |
| x-Couchiching Terriers | Rama | 35-19-1-1 | 243-190 | 72 |
| x-Villanova Knights | Toronto | 33-19-2-2 | 233-211 | 70 |
| x-Aurora Tigers | Aurora | 32-18-2-4 | 265-227 | 70 |
| x-Vaughan Vipers | Vaughan | 29-17-3-7 | 217-183 | 68 |
| y-Brampton Capitals | Brampton | 25-25-4-2 | 200-243 | 56 |
| y-Buffalo Jr. Sabres | Buffalo | 25-27-4-0 | 198-218 | 54 |
| y-Huntsville Otters | Huntsville | 22-31-3-0 | 229-236 | 47 |
| y-Mississauga Chargers | Mississauga | 18-34-2-2 | 207-273 | 40 |
| y-Bramalea Blues | Brampton | 16-36-1-3 | 199-293 | 36 |
| y-Collingwood Blues | Collingwood | 14-40-1-1 | 152-287 | 30 |
| y-Milton Icehawks | Milton | 3-51-1-1 | 145-387 | 8 |

Please note: Top eight teams make the playoffs (blue tint), (x-) denotes playoff berth, (y-) denotes elimination.

Teams listed on the official league website.

Standings listed by Pointstreak on official league website.

== 2009-10 OJAHL Playoffs ==
Quarter-final
1 | Kingston | 4
8 | Vaughan | 1
4 | Trenton | 4
5 | Couchiching | 0
2 | Oakville | 4
7 | Aurora | 1
3 | Georgetown | 4
6 | Villanova | 2

Semi-final
1 | Kingston | 4
4 | Trenton | 1
2 | Oakville | 4
3 | Georgetown | 1

Final
1 | Kingston | 3
2 | Oakville | 4

== Buckland Cup ==
The Buckland Cup is the Junior "A" Championship of the Ontario Hockey Association. The winner of the Buckland Cup moves on to the 2010 Dudley Hewitt Cup.

Oakville Blades defeated Newmarket Hurricanes (CCHL) 4-games-to-2

Game 1: 04/03/2010 - Newmarket 3 @ Oakville 4
Game 2: 04/05/2010 - Oakville 1 @ Newmarket 4
Game 3: 04/07/2010 - Newmarket 3 @ Oakville 1
Game 4: 04/08/2010 - Oakville 3 @ Newmarket 2
Game 5: 04/10/2010 - Newmarket 3 @ Oakville 4 OT
Game 6: 04/12/2010 - Oakville 6 @ Newmarket 1

== Dudley Hewitt Cup Championship ==
Hosted by the Soo Thunderbirds in Sault Ste. Marie, Ontario. The Oakville Blades finished in first place.

Round Robin

Oakville Blades 6 - Abitibi Eskimos (NOJHL) 0
Oakville Blades 3 - Soo Thunderbirds (NOJHL) 1
Oakville Blades 2 - Fort William North Stars (SIJHL) 1 in overtime

Final

Oakville Blades 2 - Fort William North Stars (SIJHL) 1

== 2010 Royal Bank Cup Championship ==
Hosted by the Dauphin Kings in Dauphin, Manitoba. The Oakville Blades finished in last place in the round robin.

Round Robin

La Ronge Ice Wolves (SJHL) 3 - Oakville Blades 2 OT
Brockville Braves (CJHL) 11 - Oakville Blades 2
Vernon Vipers (BCHL) 5 - Oakville Blades 5
Dauphin Kings (MJHL) 5 - Oakville Blades 4

== Scoring leaders ==
Note: GP = Games played; G = Goals; A = Assists; Pts = Points; PIM = Penalty minutes

| Player | Team | GP | G | A | Pts | PIM |
|---|---|---|---|---|---|---|
| Matt Smyth | Couchiching Terriers | 51 | 51 | 55 | 106 | 75 |
| David Morley | Aurora Tigers | 56 | 42 | 62 | 104 | 88 |
| Lucas VanNatter | Aurora Tigers | 56 | 39 | 57 | 96 | 10 |
| Tyler Melancon | Kingston Voyageurs | 55 | 36 | 52 | 88 | 63 |
| Brad Gehl | Trenton Golden Hawks | 52 | 40 | 46 | 86 | 66 |
| Chris Lochner | Villanova Knights | 56 | 45 | 40 | 85 | 24 |
| Matt Lorito | Villanova Knights | 56 | 32 | 46 | 78 | 20 |
| Lukas Ciotti | Brampton Capitals | 54 | 31 | 46 | 77 | 39 |
| Mike Santini | Mississauga Chargers | 44 | 36 | 40 | 76 | 52 |
| Colin Campbell | Vaughan Vipers | 46 | 32 | 44 | 76 | 55 |

== Leading goaltenders ==
Note: GP = Games played; Mins = Minutes played; W = Wins; L = Losses: OTL = Overtime losses; SL = Shootout losses; GA = Goals Allowed; SO = Shutouts; GAA = Goals against average

| Player | Team | GP | Mins | W | L | OTL | SOL | GA | SO | Sv% | GAA |
|---|---|---|---|---|---|---|---|---|---|---|---|
| Joel Vienneau | Kingston Voyageurs | 35 | 2031:27 | 27 | 4 | 1 | 2 | 73 | 3 | .928 | 2.16 |
| Kevin Kapalka | Vaughan Vipers | 43 | 2469:20 | 22 | 14 | 2 | 5 | 117 | 2 | .923 | 2.84 |
| Tony Capobianco | Georgetown Raiders | 40 | 2388:37 | 28 | 7 | 1 | 2 | 96 | 3 | .918 | 2.41 |
| Spencer Finney | Trenton Golden Hawks | 35 | 1899:45 | 23 | 7 | 1 | 1 | 97 | 3 | .917 | 3.06 |
| Landon Noel | Kingston Voyageurs | 24 | 1356:27 | 19 | 1 | 1 | 1 | 54 | 1 | .916 | 2.39 |

== Award winners ==
- Top Scorer - Matt Smyth (Couchiching Terriers)
- Best Defenceman - Kevin Christmas (Kingston Voyageurs)
- Most Gentlemanly Player - Lucas Van Natter (Aurora Tigers)
- Most Improved Player - Spencer Finner (Trenton Golden Hawks)
- Most Valuable Player - Matt Smyth (Couchiching Terriers)
- Rookie of the Year - Zach Hall (Couchiching Terriers)
- Coach of the Year - Evan Robinson (Kingston Frontenacs)
- Best Goaltender - Kevin Kapalka (Vaughan Vipers)

== See also ==
- 2010 Royal Bank Cup
- Dudley Hewitt Cup
- List of Ontario Hockey Association Junior A seasons
- Central Canadian Hockey League
- Northern Ontario Junior Hockey League
- Superior International Junior Hockey League
- Greater Ontario Junior Hockey League
- 2009 in ice hockey
- 2010 in ice hockey

| Preceded by 2008–09 OJHL season | Ontario Hockey Association; Junior A seasons | Succeeded by 2010–11 OJHL season |
