= Evgeny Palenga =

Russian ice hockey player

- Born: January 27, 1993 (age 33) Khabarovsk, Russia
- Height: 6 ft 4 in (193 cm)
- Weight: 198 lb (90 kg; 14 st 2 lb)
- Position: Defence
- Shot: Left
- Played for: HC Spartak Moscow
- NHL draft: Undrafted
- Playing career: 2011–2017

Evgeny Palenga (born January 27, 1993) is a Russian former professional ice hockey defenceman. He played one game for HC Spartak Moscow in the Kontinental Hockey League during the 2010–11 KHL season.

== Career statistics ==
			Regular season					Playoffs
Season	Team	League	GP	G	A	Pts	PIM	GP	G	A	Pts	PIM
2008–09	SDYUSHOR Spartak Moscow	MosJHL	1	0	0	0	2	—	—	—	—	—
2010–11	HC Spartak Moscow	KHL	1	0	0	0	0	—	—	—	—	—
2010–11	MHK Spartak Moscow	MHL	43	2	2	4	40	—	—	—	—	—
2011–12	MHK Spartak Moscow	MHL	60	4	6	10	32	5	0	1	1	2
2011–12	Sokol Krasnoyarsk	VHL	4	0	0	0	25	—	—	—	—	—
2012–13	Sokol Krasnoyarsk	VHL	32	1	1	2	12	—	—	—	—	—
2012–13	Krasnoyarskie Rysi	MHL B	9	2	2	4	27	4	0	1	1	4
2013–14	Sokol Krasnoyarsk	VHL	27	0	1	1	2	2	0	0	0	2
2013–14	Krasnoyarskie Rysi	MHL B	14	1	6	7	0	—	—	—	—	—
2014–15	Sakhalinskie Akuly	CCOA U20	3	0	1	1	0	—	—	—	—	—
2014–15	Sputnik Nizhny Tagil	VHL	5	0	0	0	2	—	—	—	—	—
2014–15	Khimik Voskresensk	MHL	13	0	2	2	10	—	—	—	—	—
2015–16	HK Brest	Belarus	42	4	10	14	52	—	—	—	—	—
2016–17	Yermak Angarsk	VHL	3	0	0	0	0	—	—	—	—	—
2016–17	Motala AIF	Division 2	11	0	2	2	29	—	—	—	—	—
KHL totals			1	0	0	0	0	—	—	—	—	—
VHL totals			71	1	2	3	41	2	0	0	0	2
Belarus totals			42	4	10	14	52	—	—	—	—	—
