= Viktor Rönnbäck =

Swedish ice hockey player (born 1992)

- Born: July 10, 1992 (age 33) Luleå, Sweden
- Height: 6 ft 0 in (183 cm)
- Weight: 183 lb (83 kg; 13 st 1 lb)
- Position: Defence
- Shot: Left
- Played for: Luleå HF; Kiruna IF; Kalix UHC; Bodens HF
- Playing career: 2010–2016

Viktor Rönnbäck (born July 10, 1992) is a Swedish professional ice hockey player. He played with Luleå HF in the Elitserien during the 2010–11 Elitserien season.

== Career statistics ==
| | | | Regular season | | | | | Playoffs |
| Season | Team | League | GP | G | A | Pts | PIM | GP | G | A | Pts | PIM |
|---|---|---|---|---|---|---|---|---|---|---|---|---|
| 2007–08 | Luleå HF J18 | J18 Elit | 8 | 2 | 0 | 2 | 0 | — | — | — | — | — |
| 2008–09 | Luleå HF J18 | J18 Elit | 11 | 0 | 2 | 2 | 2 | — | — | — | — | — |
| 2008–09 | Luleå HF J18 | J18 Allsvenskan | 13 | 1 | 4 | 5 | 2 | 3 | 1 | 0 | 1 | 2 |
| 2009–10 | Luleå HF J18 | J18 Elit | 18 | 2 | 5 | 7 | 41 | — | — | — | — | — |
| 2009–10 | Luleå HF J18 | J18 Allsvenskan | 17 | 0 | 2 | 2 | 14 | — | — | — | — | — |
| 2009–10 | Luleå HF J20 | J20 SuperElit | 17 | 0 | 2 | 2 | 14 | — | — | — | — | — |
| 2010–11 | Luleå HF J20 | J20 SuperElit | 41 | 3 | 5 | 8 | 10 | 6 | 0 | 0 | 0 | 4 |
| 2010–11 | Luleå HF | Elitserien | 1 | 0 | 0 | 0 | 0 | — | — | — | — | — |
| 2011–12 | Luleå HF J20 | J20 SuperElit | 45 | 0 | 10 | 10 | 108 | 3 | 0 | 0 | 0 | 25 |
| 2012–13 | Kiruna IF | Hockeyettan | 37 | 2 | 9 | 11 | 14 | 5 | 0 | 0 | 0 | 10 |
| 2013–14 | Kalix UHC | Hockeyettan | 42 | 1 | 9 | 10 | 38 | 2 | 0 | 1 | 1 | 4 |
| 2014–15 | Kalix UHC | Hockeyettan | 34 | 2 | 14 | 16 | 12 | — | — | — | — | — |
| 2015–16 | Kalix HC | Hockeyettan | 21 | 1 | 2 | 3 | 8 | — | — | — | — | — |
| 2015–16 | Bodens HF | Division 2 | 11 | 1 | 7 | 8 | 6 | 6 | 0 | 1 | 1 | 2 |
| Elitserien totals | | | 1 | 0 | 0 | 0 | 0 | — | — | — | — | — |
| Hockeyettan totals | | | 134 | 6 | 34 | 40 | 72 | 7 | 0 | 1 | 1 | 14 |
| Division 2 totals | | | 11 | 1 | 7 | 8 | 6 | 6 | 0 | 1 | 1 | 2 |
