= Alexander Lagerström =

Swedish ice hockey player

- Born: January 15, 1991 (age 34); Södertälje, Sweden
- Position: Right wing
- Played for: Södertälje SK
- Playing career: 2006–2015

Alexander Lagerström is a Swedish professional ice hockey winger who currently plays for Södertälje SK of the Elitserien.
