= Rasmus Edström =

Swedish ice hockey player

- Born: March 30, 1992 (age 34) Glommersträsk, Sweden
- Height: 6 ft 0 in (183 cm)
- Weight: 187 lb (85 kg; 13 st 5 lb)
- Position: Defence
- Shot: Left
- Played for: Skellefteå AIK; Timrå IK; Guildford Flames
- Playing career: 2010–2018

Rasmus Edström (born March 30, 1992) is a Swedish former professional ice hockey player. He last played with the Guildford Flames in the UK EIHL.

He originally played with Skellefteå AIK in the Elitserien during the 2010–11 Elitserien season and is currently playing with

== Career statistics ==
			Regular season					Playoffs
Season	Team	League	GP	G	A	Pts	PIM	GP	G	A	Pts	PIM
2007–08	MG/Arvidsjaur HC	Division 2	15	5	6	11	16	—	—	—	—	—
2008–09	Skellefteå AIK J18	J18 Elit	17	2	6	8	2	—	—	—	—	—
2008–09	Skellefteå AIK J18	J18 Allsvenskan	9	2	0	2	4	9	1	0	1	6
2008–09	Skellefteå AIK J20	J20 SuperElit	10	0	1	1	6	—	—	—	—	—
2009–10	Skellefteå AIK J18	J18 Elit	1	0	0	0	0	—	—	—	—	—
2009–10	Skellefteå AIK J18	J18 Allsvenskan	2	1	0	1	0	3	0	0	0	0
2009–10	Skellefteå AIK J20	J20 SuperElit	36	1	14	15	24	4	1	2	3	0
2009–10	Skellefteå AIK	Elitserien	1	0	0	0	0	—	—	—	—	—
2010–11	Skellefteå AIK J20	J20 SuperElit	34	3	15	18	4	5	1	2	3	0
2010–11	Skellefteå AIK	Elitserien	11	0	0	0	0	—	—	—	—	—
2011–12	Skellefteå AIK J20	J20 SuperElit	11	0	10	10	4	—	—	—	—	—
2011–12	Skellefteå AIK	Elitserien	35	2	6	8	10	—	—	—	—	—
2012–13	Skellefteå AIK J20	J20 SuperElit	3	0	2	2	2	—	—	—	—	—
2012–13	Skellefteå AIK	Elitserien	29	1	3	4	4	—	—	—	—	—
2012–13	VIK Västerås HK	HockeyAllsvenskan	2	0	0	0	0	—	—	—	—	—
2012–13	Timrå IK	Elitserien	5	0	1	1	0	—	—	—	—	—
2013–14	Skellefteå AIK J20	J20 SuperElit	1	0	0	0	2	—	—	—	—	—
2013–14	Skellefteå AIK	SHL	23	0	1	1	2	—	—	—	—	—
2013–14	IF Björklöven	HockeyAllsvenskan	3	0	1	1	2	—	—	—	—	—
2013–14	Piteå HC	Hockeyettan	5	1	0	1	0	8	2	2	4	2
2014–15	IF Björklöven	HockeyAllsvenskan	29	2	2	4	6	5	0	1	1	0
2015–16	IF Björklöven	HockeyAllsvenskan	39	1	2	3	10	—	—	—	—	—
2016–17	VIK Västerås HK	HockeyAllsvenskan	45	2	6	8	20	—	—	—	—	—
2017–18	Guildford Flames	EIHL	17	0	2	2	2	—	—	—	—	—
SHL (Elitserien) totals			104	3	11	14	16	—	—	—	—	—
EIHL totals			15	5	6	11	16	—	—	—	—	—
HockeyAllsvenskan totals			118	5	11	16	38	5	0	1	1	0
