= 2008–09 OJHL season =

- League: Ontario Junior Hockey League
- Sport: Hockey
- Duration: Regular season 2008-09-05 – 2009-02-13; Playoffs; 2009-02-10 – 2009-04-14
- Teams: 37
- Finals champions: Kingston Voyageurs

OJHL seasons
- 2007–08 2009–10 OJAHL → 2009-10 CCHL

The 2008–09 OJHL season was the 16th and final season of the Ontario Junior Hockey League (OJHL) before it was divided into two leagues for a single season. The twenty-nine teams of the Phillips, Ruddock, and MacKinnon Divisions will play 49-game schedules, while the eight teams of the Ontario Hockey Association's Central Division Hockey will play an experimental 53-game season.

Come February, the top eight teams of each division will play down for the Frank L. Buckland Trophy, the OJHL championship. The winner of the Buckland Cup will compete in the Central Canadian Junior "A" championship, the Dudley Hewitt Cup. If successful against the winners of the Northern Ontario Junior Hockey League and Superior International Junior Hockey League, the champion would then move on to play in the Canadian Junior Hockey League championship, the 2009 Royal Bank Cup.

== Changes ==
- Super Division is approved for 2008-09
- Quinte West Pack are now the Trenton Hercs
- Bramalea Blues will return for 2008–09 season
- Bancroft Hawks have been sold and are now Upper Canada Hockey Club
- Durham Fury have moved and become Whitby Fury
- Trenton Hercs folded mid-season in January 2009

== Current Standings ==
as of February 13, 2009

Note: GP = Games played; W = Wins; L = Losses; OTL = Overtime losses; SL = Shootout losses; GF = Goals for; GA = Goals against; PTS = Points; x = clinched playoff berth; y = clinched division title; z = clinched conference title

Central Division Hockey
Team	Centre	2008–09 record	GF–GA	Points
Wellington Dukes	Wellington	35-13-0-5	252-181	75
Markham Waxers	Markham	36-15-0-2	239-200	74
Toronto Jr. Canadiens	Toronto	31-20-0-2	242-251	64
Hamilton Red Wings	Hamilton	28-18-0-7	281-245	63
Newmarket Hurricanes	Newmarket	28-20-0-5	198-193	61
St. Michael's Buzzers	Toronto	24-24-0-5	227-249	53
Cobourg Cougars	Cobourg	17-27-0-9	199-238	43
Stouffville Spirit	Stouffville	13-34-0-6	165-246	32
MacKinnon Division
Team	Centre	2008–09 record	GF–GA	Points
x-Georgetown Raiders	Georgetown	42-6-0-1	263-140	85
x-Oakville Blades	Oakville	41-8-0-0	289-146	82
x-Burlington Cougars	Burlington	33-10-0-6	217-160	72
x-Vaughan Vipers	Vaughan	33-13-0-3	242-152	69
x-Buffalo Jr. Sabres	Buffalo	25-17-0-7	207-176	57
x-Milton Icehawks	Milton	21-24-0-4	208-229	46
x-Brampton Capitals	Brampton	17-24-0-8	199-233	42
x-Streetsville Derbys	Toronto	12-34-0-3	164-272	27
y-Mississauga Chargers	Mississauga	11-33-0-5	186-300	27
y-Bramalea Blues	Brampton	11-34-0-4	170-297	26
Phillips Division
Team	Centre	2008–09 record	GF–GA	Points
x-Couchiching Terriers	Rama	39-3-0-7	267-110	85
x-Huntsville Otters	Huntsville	38-7-0-4	224-125	80
x-Aurora Tigers	Aurora	37-11-0-1	228-150	75
x-Orangeville Crushers	Orangeville	33-15-0-1	212-159	67
x-North York Rangers	Toronto	28-14-0-7	223-194	63
x-Collingwood Blues	Collingwood	22-23-0-4	169-183	48
x-Toronto Dixie Beehives	Toronto	17-30-0-2	147-200	36
x-Seguin Bruins	Humphrey	16-31-0-2	185-270	34
y-Upper Canada Hockey Club	Toronto	9-39-0-1	115-286	19
y-Villanova Knights	Toronto	6-39-0-4	119-259	16
Ruddock Division
Team	Centre	2008–09 record	GF–GA	Points
x-Kingston Voyageurs	Kingston	36-9-0-4	256-136	76
x-Peterborough Stars	Peterborough	37-11-0-1	216-138	75
x-Lindsay Muskies	Lindsay	32-13-0-4	212-149	68
x-Bowmanville Eagles	Bowmanville	24-20-0-5	162-160	53
x-Ajax Attack	Ajax	25-24-0-0	216-229	50
x-Port Hope Predators	Port Hope	20-26-0-3	189-221	43
x-Whitby Fury	Whitby	16-30-0-3	181-250	35
x-Pickering Panthers	Pickering	16-30-0-3	148-249	35
y-Trenton Hercs	Trenton	14-20-0-3	129-153	31

Please note: (x-) denotes playoff berth, (y-) denotes elimination.

Teams listed on the official league website.

Standings listed by Pointstreak on official league website.

== 2008-09 Frank L. Buckland Trophy Playoffs ==
=== Championship round ===
Buckland Cup Series
R1	Kingston	4
M2	Oakville	2

=== Divisional Playoffs ===
Division Quarter-finals	Division Semi-finals
C1	Wellington	4
C8	Stouffville	0
C1	Wellington	4
C5	Newmarket	0
C4	Hamilton	1
C5	Newmarket	4
Central
C2	Markham	4
C7	Cobourg	3
C2	Markham	3
C3	Toronto	4
C3	Toronto	4
C6	St. Michael's	2
M1	Georgetown	3
M8	Streetsville	0
M1	Georgetown	4
M4	Vaughan	0
M4	Vaughan	3
M5	Buffalo	2
MacKinnon
M2	Oakville	3
M7	Brampton	0
M2	Oakville	4
M3	Burlington	1
M3	Burlington	3
M6	Milton	0

Division Finals
C1	Wellington	4
C3	Toronto	1
M1	Georgetown	3
M2	Oakville	4

CM Conference Final
C1	Wellington	3
M2	Oakville	4

Division Quarter-finals	Division Semi-finals
P1	Couchiching	3
P8	Seguin	0
P1	Couchiching	3
P4	Orangeville	4
P4	Orangeville	3
P5	North York	1
Phillips
P2	Huntsville	3
P7	Dixie	0
P2	Huntsville	4
P3	Aurora	2
P3	Aurora	3
P6	Collingwood	1
R1	Kingston	3
R8	Pickering	1
R1	Kingston	4
R5	Ajax	0
R4	Bowmanville	1
R5	Ajax	3
Ruddock
R2	Peterborough	3
R7	Whitby	1
R2	Peterborough	4
R3	Lindsay	3
R3	Lindsay	3
R6	Port Hope	0

Division Finals
P4	Orangeville	1
P2	Huntsville	4
R1	Kingston	4
R2	Peterborough	2

PR Conference Final
P2	Huntsville	1
R1	Kingston	4

Note: C is Central, M is Mackinnon, P is Phillips, R is Ruddock.

Playoff results are listed by Pointstreak on the official league website.

== Dudley Hewitt Cup Championship ==
Hosted by the Schreiber Diesels in Schreiber, Ontario. The Kingston Voyageurs finished in first place.

Round Robin

Kingston Voyageurs 9 - Schreiber Diesels (SIJHL) 0
Fort William North Stars (SIJHL) 1 - Kingston Voyageurs 0
Kingston Voyageurs 2 - Soo Thunderbirds (NOJHL) 0

Final

Kingston Voyageurs 4 - Fort William North Stars (SIJHL) 1

== 2009 Royal Bank Cup Championship ==
Hosted by the Victoria Grizzlies in Victoria, British Columbia. The Kingston Voyageurs lost out in the semi-final.

Round Robin

Victoria Grizzlies (BCHL) 5 - Kingston Voyageurs 0
Kingston Voyageurs 7 - Summerside Western Capitals (MJAHL) 5
Humboldt Broncos (SJHL) 5 - Kingston Voyageurs 2
Vernon Vipers (BCHL) 8 - Kingston Voyageurs 5

Semi-final

Vernon Vipers (BCHL) 6 - Kingston Voyageurs 3

== Scoring leaders ==
Note: GP = Games played; G = Goals; A = Assists; Pts = Points; PIM = Penalty minutes

Player	Team	GP	G	A	Pts	PIM
Nathan Pagneau	Hamilton Red Wings	53	48	55	103	20
Luke Moodie	Oakville Blades	49	41	54	95	31
Brandon Pirri	Georgetown Raiders	44	46	48	94	46
Greg Miller	St. Michael's Buzzers	49	40	51	91	56
Doug Clarkson	Vaughan Vipers	46	38	53	91	168
Andrew Marcoux	Georgetown Raiders	49	43	47	90	54
Paul Rodrigues	Toronto Jr. Canadiens	53	37	53	90	70
Matt Smyth	Cobourg Cougars	43	41	48	89	57
Dorian Peca	Vaughan Vipers	48	44	44	88	52
Shane Patrick Ferguson	Markham Waxers	53	21	64	85	120

== Leading goaltenders ==
Note: GP = Games played; Mins = Minutes played; W = Wins; L = Losses: OTL = Overtime losses; SL = Shootout losses; GA = Goals Allowed; SO = Shutouts; GAA = Goals against average

Player	Team	GP	Mins	W	L	OTL	SOL	GA	SO	Sv%	GAA
Dalton McGrath	Couchiching Terriers	21	1088:55	16	0	0	2	30	4	.937	1.65
Matt Hache	Oakville Blades	28	1656:41	23	5	0	0	64	2	.920	2.32
Shawn Sirman	Kingston Voyageurs	29	1754:58	21	5	0	3	69	3	.926	2.36
Kyle Cantlon	Couchiching Terriers	31	1829:18	22	3	2	3	75	1	.912	2.46
Ryan Williams	Huntsville Otters	37	2208:35	28	5	2	1	102	2	.908	2.77

== Players selected in 2009 NHL entry draft ==
- Rd 2 #59 Brandon Pirri - Chicago Blackhawks (Georgetown Raiders)
- Rd 3 #69 Reilly Smith - Dallas Stars (St. Michael's Buzzers)
- Rd 6 #169 Dustin Walsh - Montreal Canadiens (Kingston Voyageurs)

== See also ==
- 2009 Royal Bank Cup
- Dudley Hewitt Cup
- List of OJHL seasons
- Northern Ontario Junior Hockey League
- Superior International Junior Hockey League
- Greater Ontario Junior Hockey League
- 2008 in ice hockey
- 2009 in ice hockey

Preceded by 2007–08 OPJHL season	OJHL seasons	Succeeded by 2009–10 OJAHL season 2009-10 CCHL season
