= Christian Nyman =

Swedish ice hockey player

- Born: February 3, 1991 (age 34) Luleå, Sweden
- Height: 5 ft 9 in (175 cm)
- Weight: 179 lb (81 kg; 12 st 11 lb)
- Position: Forward
- Shoots: Left
- Elitserien team: Luleå HF
- Playing career: 2010–present

Christian Nyman (born February 3, 1991) is a Swedish professional ice hockey player. He played with Luleå HF in the Elitserien during the 2010–11 Elitserien season.
