= Tim Harrysson =

Swedish ice hockey player

- Born: February 10, 1992 (age 33) Örebro, Sweden
- Height: 5 ft 10 in (178 cm)
- Weight: 179 lb (81 kg; 12 st 11 lb)
- Position: Goaltender
- Catches: Right
- Div.1 team Former teams: Kumla HC; Linköpings HC
- Playing career: 2009–present

Tim Harrysson (born February 10, 1992) is a Swedish professional ice hockey goaltender currently playing with Kumla HC of the Hockeyettan (Div.1) He previously played with Linköpings HC in the Elitserien during the 2010–11 Elitserien season.
