= 1982–83 OJHL season =

- League: Ontario Junior Hockey League
- Sport: Hockey
- Duration: Regular season 1982-09 – 1983-02; Playoffs; 1983-02 – 1983-04
- Teams: 9
- Finals champions: North York Rangers

OJHL seasons
- 1981–82 1983–84

The 1982–83 OJHL season was the 11th season of the Ontario Junior Hockey League (OJHL). The nine teams of the league played a 48-game season. The top four teams of each division made the playoffs.

The winner of the OJHL playoffs, the North York Rangers, won the OHA Buckland Cup and then the Dudley Hewitt Cup as Central Canadian champions. The Rangers then defeated the Callaghan Cup champions from the Maritime Provinces to move on to the 1983 Centennial Cup. The Rangers won the Centennial Cup as national champions

== Changes ==
- Cambridge Winterhawks join the OJHL.
- Guelph Platers leave OJHL for OHL.
- North Bay Trappers leave the OJHL.
- Brampton Warriors leave the OJHL.

== Final standings ==
Note: GP = Games played; W = Wins; L = Losses; OTL = Overtime losses; SL = Shootout losses; GF = Goals for; GA = Goals against; PTS = Points; x = clinched playoff berth; y = clinched division title; z = clinched conference title

Kennedy Division
| Team | GP | W | L | T | GF | GA | P |
| Orillia Travelways | 48 | 25 | 18 | 5 | 226 | 196 | 55 |
| Richmond Hill Rams | 48 | 25 | 19 | 4 | 285 | 259 | 54 |
| Markham Waxers | 48 | 18 | 24 | 6 | 227 | 249 | 42 |
| Newmarket Flyers | 48 | 19 | 27 | 2 | 228 | 256 | 40 |
| Aurora Tigers | 48 | 9 | 33 | 6 | 197 | 319 | 24 |
Ruddock Division
| Team | GP | W | L | T | GF | GA | P |
| North York Rangers | 48 | 31 | 13 | 4 | 292 | 183 | 66 |
| Dixie Beehives | 48 | 25 | 18 | 5 | 245 | 240 | 55 |
| Cambridge Winterhawks | 48 | 22 | 22 | 4 | 261 | 261 | 48 |
| Hamilton Mountain A's | 48 | 21 | 21 | 6 | 226 | 224 | 48 |

== 1982-83 OJHL Playoffs ==
Quarter-final

North York Rangers defeated Cambridge Winterhawks 4-games-to-none
Hamilton Mountain A's defeated Dixie Beehives 4-games-to-1
Orillia Travelways defeated Markham Waxers 4-games-to-3
Newmarket Flyers defeated Richmond Hill Rams 4-games-to-3

Semi-final

North York Rangers defeated Hamilton Mountain A's 4-games-to-3
Orillia Travelways defeated Newmarket Flyers 4-games-to-3

Final

North York Rangers defeated Orillia Travelways 4-games-to-none

== OHA Buckland Cup Championship ==
The 1983 Buckland Cup was a best-of-5 series between the Elliot Lake Vikings (NOJHL) and the North York Rangers. The winner moved on to the 1983 Dudley Hewitt Cup.

North York Rangers defeated Elliot Lake Vikings (NOJHL) 3-games-to-2

North York 8 - Elliot Lake 4
Elliot Lake 5 - North York 4
North York 10 - Elliot Lake 4
Elliot Lake 6 - North York 5
North York 9 - Elliot Lake 3

== Dudley Hewitt Cup Championship ==
The 1984 Dudley Hewitt Cup was a best-of-7 series between the Thunder Bay Kings (TBHL) and the North York Rangers. The winner moved on to the 1983 Eastern Centennial Cup championship.

North York Rangers defeated Thunder Bay Kings (TBHL) 4-games-to-none

North York 7 - Thunder Bay 1
North York 8 - Thunder Bay 4
North York 6 - Thunder Bay 4
North York 7 - Thunder Bay 4

== 1983 Eastern Canada Championship ==
The 1983 Eastern Canada Centennial Cup championship was a best-of-7 series between the Halifax Lions (MVJHL) and the North York Rangers. The winner moved on to the 1983 Centennial Cup championship.

North York Rangers defeated Halifax Lions (MVJHL) 4-games-to-1

North York 10 - Halifax 3
North York 7 - Halifax 6
Halifax 8 - North York 1
North York 7 - Halifax 5 OT
North York 9 - Halifax 3

== 1983 Centennial Cup Championship ==
The 1983 Centennial Cup was the best-of-7 Canadian National Junior A championship series between the Eastern Champion North York Rangers and the Western Abbott Cup champion Abbotsford Flyers (BCJHL).

North York Rangers defeated Abbotsford Flyers (BCJHL) 4-games-to-none

North York 9 - Abbotsford 6
North York 8 - Abbotsford 5
North York 10 - Abbotsford 3
North York 10 - Abbotsford 2

== Leading Scorers ==
| Player / Team / GP / G / A / Pts; John Kovaks / Richmond Hill Rams / 47 / 50 / 57 / 107 |

== Players taken in the 1983 NHL entry draft ==
- Rd 7 #129 Iain Duncan - Winnipeg Jets (North York Rangers)

== See also ==
- 1983 Centennial Cup
- Dudley Hewitt Cup
- List of Ontario Hockey Association Junior A seasons
- Thunder Bay Junior A Hockey League
- Northern Ontario Junior Hockey League
- Central Junior A Hockey League
- 1982 in ice hockey
- 1983 in ice hockey

| Preceded by 1981–82 OJHL season | Ontario Hockey Association; Junior A Seasons | Succeeded by 1983–84 OJHL season |
