= 1981–82 OJHL season =

- League: Ontario Junior Hockey League
- Sport: Hockey
- Duration: Regular season 1981-09 – 1982-02; Playoffs; 1982-02 – 1982-04
- Number of teams: 11
- Finals champions: Guelph Platers

OJHL seasons
- ← 1980–81 1982–83 →

The 1981–82 OJHL season was the 10th season of the Ontario Junior Hockey League (OJHL). The 11 teams of the league played a 50-game season. The top four teams of each division make the playoffs.

The winner of the OJHL playoffs, the Guelph Platers, won the OHA Buckland Cup and then the Dudley Hewitt Cup as Central Canadian champions. The Platers then defeated the Callaghan Cup champions from the Maritime Provinces to move on to the 1982 Centennial Cup. The Platers lost the Centennial Cup for the national champions

== Changes ==
- League changes name to Ontario Junior Hockey League.
- Team jumps to two division format.
- Orillia Travelways join OJHL from CJBHL.
- Belleville Bulls leave OJHL for OHL.
- Wexford Raiders leave OJHL.

== Final standings ==
Note: GP = Games played; W = Wins; L = Losses; OTL = Overtime losses; SL = Shootout losses; GF = Goals for; GA = Goals against; PTS = Points; x = clinched playoff berth; y = clinched division title; z = clinched conference title

Kennedy Division
Team	GP	W	L	T	GF	GA	P
Aurora Tigers	50	31	15	4	310	252	66
Markham Waxers	50	26	19	5	304	265	57
Newmarket Flyers	50	20	24	6	287	298	46
Richmond Hill Rams	50	18	25	7	256	261	43
Orillia Travelways	50	11	37	2	214	335	24
North Bay Trappers	50	8	38	4	206	403	20
Ruddock Division
Team	GP	W	L	T	GF	GA	P
Guelph Platers	50	40	4	6	328	152	86
Brampton Warriors	50	40	6	4	338	174	84
Dixie Beehives	50	19	24	7	236	234	45
North York Rangers	50	16	26	8	215	244	40
Hamilton Mountain A's	50	18	29	3	229	292	39

== 1981-82 OJHL Playoffs ==
Quarter-final

Guelph Platers defeated North York Rangers 4-games-to-none
Dixie Beehives defeated Brampton Warriors 4-games-to-1
Markham Waxers defeated Aurora Tigers 4-games-to-1
Richmond Hill Rams defeated Newmarket Flyers 4-games-to-3

Semi-final

Guelph Platers defeated Richmond Hill Rams 4-games-to-none
Markham Waxers defeated Dixie Beehives 4-games-to-2

Final

Guelph Platers defeated Markham Waxers 4-games-to-1

== OHA Buckland Cup Championship ==
The 1982 Buckland Cup was a best-of-5 series between the Onaping Falls Huskies (NOJHL) and the Guelph Platers. The winner moved on to the 1982 Dudley Hewitt Cup semi-final.

Guelph Platers defeated Onaping Falls Huskies 3-games-to-none

Guelph 6 - Onaping Falls 2
Guelph 8 - Onaping Falls 3
Guelph 6 - Onaping Falls 1

== Dudley Hewitt Cup Championship ==
The 1982 Dudley Hewitt Cup was a four team playdown between the Guelph Platers, Thunder Bay Kings (TBHL), Pembroke Lumber Kings (CJHL), and La Prairie Flames (QJAHL). The winner moved on to the 1982 Eastern Centennial Cup championship.

Semi-final

Guelph Platers defeated Thunder Bay Kings (TBHL) 3-games-to-none

Guelph 7 - Thunder Bay 4
Guelph 5 - Thunder Bay 2
Guelph 7 - Thunder Bay 3

Final

Guelph Platers defeated Pembroke Lumber Kings (CJHL) 4-games-to-none

Guelph 3 - Pembroke 2
Guelph 10 - Pembroke 2
Guelph 6 - Pembroke 2
Guelph 7 - Pembroke 0

== 1982 Eastern Canada Championship ==
The 1982 Eastern Canada Centennial Cup championship was a best-of-7 series between the Moncton Hawks (NBJHL) and the Guelph Platers. The winner moved on to the 1982 Centennial Cup championship.

Guelph Platers defeated Moncton Hawks (NBJHL) 4-games-to-1

Guelph 8 - Moncton 2
Moncton 5 - Guelph 4
Guelph 13 - Moncton 4
Guelph 11 - Moncton 2
Guelph 14 - Moncton 4

== 1982 Centennial Cup Championship ==
The 1982 Centennial Cup was the best-of-7 Canadian National Junior A championship series between the Eastern Champion Guelph Platers and the Western Abbott Cup champion Prince Albert Raiders (SJHL).

Prince Albert Raiders (SJHL) defeated Guelph Platers 4-games-to-none

Prince Albert 9 - Guelph 4
Prince Albert 7 - Guelph 3
Prince Albert 6 - Guelph 3
Prince Albert 8 - Guelph 4

== Leading Scorers ==
Player	Team	GP	G	A	Pts
Adam Oates	Markham Waxers	47	54	105	159
Steve Thomas	Markham Waxers	48	68	57	125
John Scherer	Brampton Warriors	49	65	51	116
Tod Stark	Guelph Platers	49	50	54	104

== See also ==
- 1982 Centennial Cup
- Dudley Hewitt Cup
- List of Ontario Hockey Association Junior A seasons
- Thunder Bay Junior A Hockey League
- Northern Ontario Junior Hockey League
- Central Junior A Hockey League
- Quebec Junior A Hockey League
- 1981 in ice hockey
- 1982 in ice hockey

Preceded by 1980–81 OPJHL season	Ontario Hockey Association; Junior A Seasons	Succeeded by 1982–83 OJHL season
