= Iain Duncan =

Canadian ice hockey player

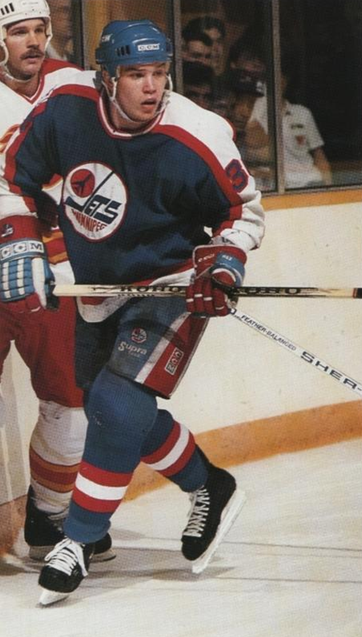
- Duncan in 1988 photo
- Born: August 4, 1963 (age 63) Toronto, Ontario, Canada
- Height: 6 ft 1 in (185 cm)
- Weight: 201 lb (91 kg; 14 st 5 lb)
- Position: Left wing
- Shot: Left
- Played for: Winnipeg Jets
- NHL draft: 129th overall, 1983; Winnipeg Jets
- Playing career: 1987–1998

Iain C. Duncan (born August 4, 1963) is a Canadian former professional ice hockey forward.

== Early life ==
Duncan was born in Toronto, Ontario. He played for the Bowling Green State University Falcons for four years, being named to their "all-century team" in 2000.

== Career ==
Duncan started his National Hockey League career with the Winnipeg Jets in 1987, where he played his entire NHL career. He was named to the NHL All-Rookie Team in 1988. After the 1991 season, Duncan then played the next eight seasons in minor leagues with several clubs. He retired from hockey after 1998.

From 2018 to 2020, he was the head coach and general manager of the minor professional Mentor Ice Breakers in the Federal Hockey League.

== Awards and honours ==
Award	Year
All-CCHA First Team	1986–87

== Career statistics ==
=== Regular season and playoffs ===
			Regular season					Playoffs
Season	Team	League	GP	G	A	Pts	PIM	GP	G	A	Pts	PIM
1980–81	North York Flames	MetJHL	13	3	11	14	30	—	—	—	—	—
1980–81	Wexford Warriors	OPJHL	2	1	0	1	0	—	—	—	—	—
1981–82	North York Rangers	OJHL	—	—	—	—	—	—	—	—	—	—
1982–83	Orillia Travelways	OJHL	3	1	0	1	6	—	—	—	—	—
1982–83	North York Flames	MetJHL	15	10	14	24	89	—	—	—	—	—
1983–84	Bowling Green State University	CCHA	44	9	11	20	65	—	—	—	—	—
1984–85	Bowling Green State University	CCHA	37	9	21	30	105	—	—	—	—	—
1985–86	Bowling Green State University	CCHA	41	26	26	52	124	—	—	—	—	—
1986–87	Bowling Green State University	CCHA	39	28	40	68	141	—	—	—	—	—
1986–87	Winnipeg Jets	NHL	6	1	2	3	0	7	0	2	2	6
1987–88	Winnipeg Jets	NHL	62	19	23	42	73	4	0	1	1	0
1987–88	Moncton Hawks	AHL	8	1	3	4	26	—	—	—	—	—
1988–89	Winnipeg Jets	NHL	57	14	30	44	74	—	—	—	—	—
1989–90	Moncton Hawks	AHL	49	16	25	41	81	—	—	—	—	—
1990–91	Winnipeg Jets	NHL	2	0	0	0	2	—	—	—	—	—
1990–91	Moncton Hawks	AHL	66	19	45	64	105	8	3	4	7	40
1991–92	Phoenix Roadrunners	IHL	46	12	24	36	103	—	—	—	—	—
1992–93	Adirondack Red Wings	AHL	1	0	0	0	2	—	—	—	—	—
1992–93	Toledo Storm	ECHL	50	40	50	90	190	16	9	19	28	55
1993–94	Toledo Storm	ECHL	8	6	8	14	23	14	6	11	17	32
1994–95	Toledo Storm	ECHL	37	9	34	43	133	4	1	2	3	10
1996–97	Nashville Nighthawks	CHL	12	7	11	18	68	—	—	—	—	—
1997–98	Nashville Ice Flyers	CHL	35	4	22	26	77	—	—	—	—	—
AHL totals			124	36	73	109	214	8	3	4	7	40
NHL totals			127	34	55	89	149	11	0	3	3	6
