= Don Grierson =

Don Grierson may refer to:

- Don Grierson (geneticist) (born 1945), British geneticist
- Don Grierson (ice hockey) (born 1947), Canadian ice hockey player
- Don Grierson (music executive) (1940s–2019), UK-born music industry executive
