= North York Rangers (1967–1984) =

North York Red Wings
- City: North York, Ontario, Canada (1967–1985); Woodbridge, Ontario, Canada (1966–1967)
- League: Ontario Junior Hockey League
- Operated: 1966–1985
- Colours: Blue, Red, and White

Franchise history
- 1966–1967: Woodbridge Rangers
- 1967–1984: North York Rangers
- 1984–1985: North York Red Wings

The North York Rangers were a junior ice hockey team. They originated in 1967, when the Woodbridge Rangers of the Metro Junior B League moved to North York. The team operated out of the Metro League until the Ontario Junior Hockey League was founded in 1972, at which point the Rangers and four other Metro teams moved to the new league. The Rangers made it to the Royal Bank Cup in 1980 and 1983. In 1984, the team was renamed the North York Red Wings and folded after one season.

== Season-by-season results ==
=== Regular season ===
Season	GP	W	L	T	GF	GA	P	Results	Playoffs
Woodbridge Rangers
1966–67	36	3	33	0	88	316	6	7th Metro B	
North York Rangers
1967–68	36	14	16	6	154	163	34	7th Metro B	
1968–69	36	10	26	0	130	153	20	8th Metro B	
1969–70	36	24	7	5	202	124	53	3rd Metro B	
1970–71	44	28	10	6	233	163	62	3rd Metro B	
1971–72	44	18	21	5	159	158	41	7th Metro B	
1972–73	44	11	23	10	163	185	32	10th OPJHL	
1973–74	44	26	11	7	231	151	59	1st OPJHL	
1974–75	44	24	15	5	216	215	53	2nd OPJHL	
1975–76	44	31	8	5	220	142	67	1st OPJHL	
1976–77	44	34	6	4	281	163	72	1st OPJHL	Won League
1977–78	50	17	26	7	232	257	41	7th OPJHL	
1978–79	50	27	17	6	288	237	60	5th OPJHL	
1979–80	44	26	14	4	239	183	56	4th OPJHL	Won League
1980–81	44	24	17	3	259	218	51	3rd OPJHL	
1981–82	50	16	26	8	215	244	40	8th OJHL	
1982–83	48	31	13	4	292	183	66	1st OJHL	Won League, won DHC, won MCC
1983–84	42	22	17	3	252	207	47	3rd OJHL	
North York Red Wings
1984–85	48	10	37	1	185	332	21	7th OJHL	

=== Playoffs ===
- 1973 DNQ
- 1974 Lost semi-final

North York Rangers defeated Dixie Beehives 4-games-to-3
Aurora Tigers defeated North York Rangers 4-games-to-none

- 1975 Lost semi-final

North York Rangers defeated Whitby Knob Hill Farms 4-games-to-1
Wexford Raiders defeated North York Rangers 4-games-to-3

- 1976 Lost final

North York Rangers defeated Ajax Knob Hill Farms 4-games-to-1 with 1 tie
North York Rangers defeated Toronto Nationals 4-games-to-1
North Bay Trappers defeated North York Rangers 4-games-to-3

- 1977 Won League, won OHA Buckland Cup, lost Hewitt-Dudley Memorial Trophy semi-final

North York Rangers defeated Richmond Hill Rams 4-games-to-1
North York Rangers defeated Royal York Royals 4-games-to-2
North York Rangers defeated North Bay Trappers 4-games-to-1 OPJHL CHAMPIONS
North York Rangers defeated Guelph Platers (SOJHL) 4-games-to-3 BUCKLAND CUP CHAMPIONS
North York Rangers defeated Thunder Bay Eagles (TBJHL) 4-games-to-1
Pembroke Lumber Kings (CJHL) defeated North York Rangers 4-games-to-2

- 1978 Lost quarter-final

North Bay Trappers defeated North York Rangers 4-games-to-1

- 1979 Lost semi-final

North York Rangers defeated Royal York Royals 4-games-to-3
Guelph Platers defeated North York Rangers 4-games-to-none

- 1980 Won League, won OHA Buckland Cup, won Dudley Hewitt Cup, lost 1980 Centennial Cup final

North York Rangers defeated Guelph Platers 4-games-to-3
North York Rangers defeated Dixie Beehives 4-games-to-2
North York Rangers defeated Royal York Royals 4-games-to-1 OPJHL CHAMPIONS
North York Rangers defeated Onaping Falls Huskies (NOJHL) 3-games-to-none BUCKLAND CUP CHAMPIONS
North York Rangers defeated Thunder Bay North Stars (TBJHL) 4-games-to-none
North York Rangers defeated Joliette Cyclones (QJAHL) 4-games-to-2 DUDLEY HEWITT CUP CHAMPIONS
Second in 1980 Centennial Cup round robin (2-2)
Red Deer Rustlers (AJHL) defeated North York Rangers 3-2 in final

- 1981 Lost semi-final

North York Rangers defeated Dixie Beehives 4-games-to-1
Guelph Platers defeated North York Rangers 4-games-to-3

- 1982 Lost quarter-final

Guelph Platers defeated North York Rangers 4-games-to-none

- 1983 Won League, won OHA Buckland Cup, won Dudley Hewitt Cup, won Eastern Canada Championship, won 1983 Centennial Cup

North York Rangers defeated Cambridge Winterhawks 4-games-to-none
North York Rangers defeated Hamilton Mountain A's 4-games-to-3
North York Rangers defeated Orillia Travelways 4-games-to-none OJHL CHAMPIONS
North York Rangers defeated Elliot Lake Vikings (NOJHL) 3-games-to-2 BUCKLAND CUP CHAMPIONS
North York Rangers defeated Thunder Bay Kings (TBJHL) 4-games-to-none DUDLEY HEWITT CUP CHAMPIONS
North York Rangers defeated Halifax Lions (MVJHL) 4-games-to-1 EASTERN CANADA CHAMPIONS
North York Rangers defeated Abbotsford Flyers (BCJHL) 4-games-to-none CENTENNIAL CUP CHAMPIONS

- 1984 Lost semi-final

North York Rangers defeated Richmond Hill Dynes 4-games-to-2
Orillia Travelways defeated North York Rangers 4-games-to-none

- 1985 Lost quarter-final

Aurora Tigers defeated North York Red Wings 4-games-to-none

== NHL alumni ==
List of North York Rangers alumni to play in the National Hockey League (NHL).

- Paul Coffey
- Iain Duncan
- Paul Evans
- Mike Hartman
- Scott Howson
- Bob Hurlburt
- Ron Lalonde
- Ken Lockett
- Darren Lowe
- Jeff Madill
- Tom McCarthy
- Bernie Nicholls
- Gerry O'Flaherty
- Paul Pooley
- John Purves
- Steve Shutt

Preceded by Prince Albert Raiders	Centennial Cup Champions; 1983	Succeeded by Weyburn Red Wings
