= 1980 Centennial Cup =

1980 Manitoba Centennial Cup
Tournament details
- Venue: North York, Ontario
- Dates: May 1980
- Teams: 3

Final positions
- Champions: Red Deer Rustlers (2nd title)
- Runners-up: North York Rangers
- Third place: Sherwood-Parkdale Metros

Tournament statistics
- Games played: 7
- Scoring leader: Bill Colville (North York)

Awards
- MVP: Brent Sutter (Red Deer)

The 1980 Centennial Cup is the tenth Tier II Junior "A" 1980 ice hockey National Championship for the Canadian Junior A Hockey League.

The Centennial Cup was competed for by the winners of the Abbott Cup, Dudley Hewitt Cup, and the Callaghan Cup.

The tournament was hosted by the North York Rangers in the city of North York, Ontario.

== The Playoffs ==
=== Round Robin ===
Pos	League (Ticket)	Team	Pld	W	L	GF	GA	GD	Qualification
1	AJHL (Abbott Cup)	Red Deer Rustlers	4	3	1	18	15	+3	Final
2	OPJHL (Dudley Hewitt Cup)	North York Rangers	4	2	2	16	15	+1	Final
3	IJHL (Callaghan Cup)	Sherwood-Parkdale Metros	4	1	3	19	23	−4	

==== Results ====
Sherwood-Parkdale Metros defeated North York Rangers 7-6 2OT
North York Rangers defeated Red Deer Rustlers 2-0
Red Deer Rustlers defeated Sherwood-Parkdale Metros 6-0
North York Rangers defeated Sherwood-Parkdale Metros 4-3
Red Deer Rustlers defeated North York Rangers 5-4 2OT
Red Deer Rustlers defeated Sherwood-Parkdale Metros 7-6 2OT

Note: OT - denotes overtime

=== Finals ===
Finals
1	Red Deer Rustlers	3
2	North York Rangers	2

== Awards ==
Most Valuable Player: Brent Sutter (Red Deer Rustlers)
Top Scorer: Bill Colville (North York Rangers)
Most Sportsmanlike Player: Doug Rigler (Red Deer Rustlers)

=== All-Star Team ===
Forward

Bill Colville (North York Rangers)
Doug Rigler (Red Deer Rustlers)
Paul Bernard (Sherwood-Parkdale Metros)

Defence

Jim File (North York Rangers)
Jeff Woollacott (North York Rangers)

Goal

Brian Ford (Red Deer Rustlers)

== Roll of League Champions ==
AJHL: Red Deer Rustlers
BCJHL: Penticton Knights
CJHL: Hawkesbury Hawks
IJHL: Sherwood-Parkdale Metros
MJHL: Selkirk Steelers
MVJHL: Cole Harbour Colts
NBJHL:
NOJHL: Onaping Falls Huskies
OPJHL: North York Rangers
QJAHL:
SJHL: Prince Albert Raiders

== See also ==
- Canadian Junior A Hockey League
- Royal Bank Cup
- Anavet Cup
- Doyle Cup
- Dudley Hewitt Cup
- Fred Page Cup
- Abbott Cup
- Mowat Cup
