= 1981 Centennial Cup =

1981 Manitoba Centennial Cup
Tournament details
- Venue: Halifax, Nova Scotia
- Dates: May 1981
- Teams: 3

Final positions
- Champions: Prince Albert Raiders (3rd title)
- Runners-up: Belleville Bulls
- Third place: Cole Harbour Colts

Tournament statistics
- Games played: 7
- Scoring leader: Dave Tippett (Prince Albert)

Awards
- MVP: James Patrick (Prince Albert)

The 1981 Centennial Cup is the 11th Junior "A" 1981 ice hockey National Championship for the Canadian Junior A Hockey League.

The Centennial Cup was competed for by the winners of the Abbott Cup, Dudley Hewitt Cup, and the Callaghan Cup.

The tournament was hosted by the Cole Harbour Colts in the city of Halifax, Nova Scotia.

== The Playoffs ==
=== Round Robin ===
Pos	League (Ticket)	Team	Pld	W	L	GF	GA	GD	Qualification
1	SJHL (Abbott Cup)	Prince Albert Raiders	4	3	1	24	12	+12	Final
2	OPJHL (Dudley Hewitt Cup)	Belleville Bulls	4	3	1	17	14	+3	Final
3	MVJHL (Callaghan Cup)	Cole Harbour Colts	4	0	4	11	26	−15	

==== Results ====
Belleville Bulls defeated Cole Harbour Colts 5-3
Prince Albert Raiders defeated Cole Harbour Colts 7-2
Prince Albert Raiders defeated Belleville Bulls 4-1
Belleville Bulls defeated Cole Harbour Colts 5-3
Prince Albert Raiders defeated Cole Harbour Colts 9-3
Belleville Bulls defeated Prince Albert Raiders 6-4

=== Finals ===
Finals
1	Prince Albert Raiders	6
2	Belleville Bulls	2

== Awards ==
Most Valuable Player: James Patrick (Prince Albert Raiders)
Top Scorer: Dave Tippett (Prince Albert Raiders)
Most Sportsmanlike Player: Mochie Friesen (Cole Harbour Colts)

=== All-Star Team ===
Forward

Dave Tippett (Prince Albert Raiders)
Greg Paslawski (Prince Albert Raiders)
Bill Watson (Prince Albert Raiders)

Defence

James Patrick (Prince Albert Raiders)
Mike Deodato (Belleville Bulls)

Goal

Dan Burnoiss (Belleville Bulls)

== Roll of League Champions ==
AJHL: St. Albert Saints
BCJHL: Penticton Knights
CJHL: Gloucester Rangers
IJHL: Sherwood-Parkdale Metros
MJHL: St. Boniface Saints
MVJHL: Cole Harbour Colts
NBJHL: Moncton Beavers
NOJHL: Onaping Falls Huskies
OPJHL: Belleville Bulls
PCJHL: Prince George Spruce Kings
QJAHL:
SJHL: Prince Albert Raiders

== See also ==
- Abbott Cup
- Anavet Cup
- Canadian Junior A Hockey League
- Doyle Cup
- Dudley Hewitt Cup
- Fred Page Cup
- Mowat Cup
- Royal Bank Cup
