= Mitch Babin =

Canadian ice hockey player

- Born: December 1, 1954 (age 70); Kapuskasing, Ontario, Canada
- Height: 6 ft 2 in (188 cm)
- Weight: 190 lb (86 kg; 13 st 8 lb)
- Position: Centre
- Shot: Left
- Played for: St. Louis Blues; VEU Feldkirch
- NHL draft: 180th overall, 1974; St. Louis Blues
- WHA draft: 218th overall, 1974; Indianapolis Racers
- Playing career: 1974–1979

Michel J. Babin (born December 1, 1954) is a Canadian retired ice hockey player. He played 8 games in the National Hockey League with the St. Louis Blues during the 1975–76 season. The rest of his career, which lasted from 1974 to 1979, was mainly spent in the minor leagues.

== Playing career ==
Babin spent his junior years in the Manitoba Junior Hockey League for the Kenora Muskies and in the Northern Ontario Junior Hockey Association for the North Bay Trappers. He was drafted 180th overall by the St. Louis Blues in the 1974 NHL Amateur Draft and 218th overall by the Indianapolis Racers in the 1974 WHA Amateur Draft. Babin chose to report to the Blues and was sent to the Denver Spurs of the Central Hockey League for development. He eventually played eight games for St. Louis during the 1975-76 NHL season but did not manage to score a point and spent the remainder of the season in the American Hockey League for the Providence Reds. He returned to the CHL for spells with the Kansas City Blues and the Salt Lake Golden Eagles before finishing his career in Austria for VEU Feldkirch.

== Career statistics ==
=== Regular season and playoffs ===
| | | | Regular season | | | | | Playoffs |
| Season | Team | League | GP | G | A | Pts | PIM | GP | G | A | Pts | PIM |
|---|---|---|---|---|---|---|---|---|---|---|---|---|
| 1971–72 | Kenora Muskies | MJHL | 46 | 22 | 22 | 44 | 89 | — | — | — | — | — |
| 1972–73 | North Bay Trappers | OPJAHL | 43 | 35 | 37 | 72 | 101 | — | — | — | — | — |
| 1973–74 | North Bay Trappers | OPJAHL | 43 | 29 | 51 | 80 | 60 | — | — | — | — | — |
| 1974–75 | Denver Spurs | CHL | 70 | 30 | 43 | 75 | 48 | 2 | 0 | 2 | 2 | 4 |
| 1975–76 | St. Louis Blues | NHL | 8 | 0 | 0 | 0 | 0 | — | — | — | — | — |
| 1975–76 | Providence Reds | AHL | 54 | 8 | 9 | 17 | 14 | 2 | 0 | 0 | 0 | 0 |
| 1976–77 | Kansas City Blues | CHL | 75 | 26 | 25 | 51 | 59 | 10 | 4 | 4 | 8 | 6 |
| 1977–78 | Salt Lake Golden Eagles | CHL | 17 | 2 | 4 | 6 | 6 | — | — | — | — | — |
| 1978–79 | VEU Feldkirch | AUT | 29 | 28 | 23 | 51 | 62 | — | — | — | — | — |
| CHL totals | | | 162 | 58 | 72 | 130 | 113 | 12 | 4 | 6 | 10 | 10 |
| NHL totals | | | 8 | 0 | 0 | 0 | 0 | — | — | — | — | — |
