= Plasse =

Plasse is a surname. Notable people with the surname include:

- Christopher Mintz-Plasse (born 1989), American actor and comedian
- Michel Plasse (1948–2006), Canadian ice hockey player
