= Bob McGill =

Canadian ice hockey player

- Born: April 27, 1962 (age 64) Edmonton, Alberta, Canada
- Height: 6 ft 1 in (185 cm)
- Weight: 205 lb (93 kg; 14 st 9 lb)
- Position: Defence
- Shot: Right
- Played for: Toronto Maple Leafs; Chicago Black Hawks; San Jose Sharks; Detroit Red Wings; New York Islanders; Hartford Whalers
- NHL draft: 26th overall, 1980; Toronto Maple Leafs
- Playing career: 1981–1996

Robert Paul McGill (born April 27, 1962) is a Canadian former professional ice hockey player. McGill played in the National Hockey League (NHL) from 1981 until 1994.

== Early life ==
McGill began playing hockey when he moved to Leduc with his family in 1970. He left Leduc to play for the BCJHL’s Abbotsford Flyers in 1978. McGill joined the WHL’s Victoria Cougars from 1979 to 1981, winning the WHL championship in 1981.

== Playing career ==
McGill started his NHL career with the Toronto Maple Leafs in 1981–82 after he was selected 26th overall by the Leafs in the 1980 NHL entry draft.

He also played for the Chicago Black Hawks, San Jose Sharks, Detroit Red Wings, New York Islanders, and Hartford Whalers.

McGill was selected by the Tampa Bay Lightning in the 1992 NHL Expansion Draft. He retired from the NHL after the 1993–94 season.

== Coaching career ==
McGill has coached in both the American Hockey League, becoming the assistant coach of the AHL’s Hershey Bears from 1996 to 1998, who won the 1997 Calder Cup. He then went on to become the head coach of the Baton Rouge Kingfish from 1998 to 2000 in the East Coast Hockey League.

== Broadcasting career ==
In 2005, McGill has transitioned into a career as an analyst with Leafs Nation Network, a popular media outlet in the Greater Toronto Area following the Toronto Maple Leafs and their AHL affiliate the Toronto Marlies. McGill also serves as the colour analyst for the Marlies radio broadcasts on AM 640 Toronto.

== Personal ==
In 2018, McGill and his mother Kay McGill, long-time Leduc Minor Hockey Association volunteer and first female president in 1977, both made their way into Leduc’s Sports Hall of Fame.

== Career statistics ==
			Regular season					Playoffs
Season	Team	League	GP	G	A	Pts	PIM	GP	G	A	Pts	PIM
1978–79	Abbotsford Flyers	BCHL	46	3	20	23	242	—	—	—	—	—
1979–80	Victoria Cougars	WHL	70	3	18	21	230	15	0	5	5	64
1980–81	Victoria Cougars	WHL	66	5	36	41	295	11	1	5	6	67
1981–82	Toronto Maple Leafs	NHL	68	1	10	11	263	—	—	—	—	—
1982–83	Toronto Maple Leafs	NHL	30	0	0	0	146	—	—	—	—	—
1982–83	St. Catharines Saints	AHL	32	2	5	7	95	—	—	—	—	—
1983–84	Toronto Maple Leafs	NHL	11	0	2	2	51	—	—	—	—	—
1983–84	St. Catharines Saints	AHL	55	1	15	16	217	—	—	—	—	—
1984–85	Toronto Maple Leafs	NHL	72	0	5	5	250	—	—	—	—	—
1985–86	Toronto Maple Leafs	NHL	61	1	4	5	141	9	0	0	0	35
1986–87	Toronto Maple Leafs	NHL	56	1	4	5	103	3	0	0	0	0
1987–88	Chicago Blackhawks	NHL	67	4	7	11	131	3	0	0	0	2
1988–89	Chicago Blackhawks	NHL	68	0	4	4	155	16	0	0	0	33
1989–90	Chicago Blackhawks	NHL	69	2	10	12	204	5	0	0	0	2
1990–91	Chicago Blackhawks	NHL	77	4	5	9	151	5	0	0	0	2
1991–92	San Jose Sharks	NHL	62	3	1	4	70	—	—	—	—	—
1991–92	Detroit Red Wings	NHL	12	0	0	0	21	8	0	0	0	14
1992–93	Toronto Maple Leafs	NHL	19	1	0	1	34	—	—	—	—	—
1993–94	New York Islanders	NHL	3	0	0	0	5	—	—	—	—	—
1993–94	Hartford Whalers	NHL	30	0	3	3	41	—	—	—	—	—
1993–94	Springfield Indians	AHL	5	0	0	0	24	—	—	—	—	—
1995–96	Chicago Wolves	IHL	8	0	0	0	6	—	—	—	—	—
NHL totals			705	17	55	72	1766	49	0	0	0	88
