= Bob Hurlburt =

Canadian ice hockey player

- Born: May 1, 1950 (age 75) Toronto, Ontario, Canada
- Height: 5 ft 11 in (180 cm)
- Weight: 185 lb (84 kg; 13 st 3 lb)
- Position: Left wing
- Shot: Left
- Played for: Vancouver Canucks
- NHL draft: Undrafted
- Playing career: 1970–1975

Robert George Hurlburt (born May 1, 1950) is a Canadian former professional ice hockey left winger who played one game in the National Hockey League (NHL) for the Vancouver Canucks, on November 23 1974 against the New York Islanders. Primarily a defensive forward, the rest of his professional career was spent in the minor leagues, split between the American Hockey League, Western Hockey League, and Central Hockey League, in a career that lasted from 1970 until 1975.

== Career statistics ==
=== Regular season and playoffs ===
			Regular season					Playoffs
Season	Team	League	GP	G	A	Pts	PIM	GP	G	A	Pts	PIM
1967–68	North York Rangers	OHA-B	35	19	11	30	54	—	—	—	—	—
1968–69	Kitchener Rangers	OHA	53	9	14	23	76	—	—	—	—	—
1969–70	Kitchener Rangers	OHA	54	9	13	22	126	5	0	0	0	6
1970–71	Quebec Aces	AHL	72	10	21	31	51	1	0	1	1	0
1971–72	Richmond Robins	AHL	69	5	13	18	69	—	—	—	—	—
1972–73	Richmond Robins	AHL	71	2	11	13	64	2	0	0	0	2
1973–74	San Diego Gulls	WHL	75	20	27	47	51	4	0	3	3	2
1974–75	Vancouver Canucks	NHL	1	0	0	0	2	—	—	—	—	—
1974–75	Seattle Totems	CHL	74	16	23	39	68	—	—	—	—	—
AHL totals			212	17	45	62	184	3	0	1	1	2
NHL totals			1	0	0	0	2	—	—	—	—	—

== See also ==
- List of players who played only one game in the NHL
