= Bob Dupuis =

Canadian ice hockey player (born 1952)

- Born: August 26, 1952 (age 72); Blind River, Ontario, Canada
- Height: 5 ft 11 in (180 cm)
- Weight: 167 lb (76 kg; 11 st 13 lb)
- Position: Goaltender
- Caught: Left
- Played for: Edmonton Oilers
- National team: Canada
- NHL draft: Undrafted
- Playing career: 1972–1981

Robert A. Dupuis (born August 26, 1952) is a Canadian former professional ice hockey goaltender who played one game in the National Hockey League (NHL) for the Edmonton Oilers during the 1979–80 season. The Oilers lost 5-3 to the Philadelphia Flyers on March 9, 1980, with Dupuis conceding four of those goals.

Dupuis represented Canada at the 1980 Winter Olympics held in Lake Placid, where he was the goalie in three games; a win versus the Netherlands, and two losses in decisive games against Finland and Czechoslovakia.

Before 1980, he had played for five years in the senior Ontario Hockey Association with the Cambridge Hornets and Barrie Flyers and had previous experience in junior B (North Bay Trappers) and semi-pro minor leagues.

Dupuis retired from hockey in 1981, moved to North Bay, Ontario, and worked for the police department as a 9-1-1 dispatcher.

== Career statistics ==
=== Regular season and playoffs ===
			Regular season									Playoffs
Season	Team	League	GP	W	L	T	MIN	GA	SO	GAA	SV%	GP	W	L	MIN	GA	SO	GAA	SV%
1967–68	North Bay Trappers	NOJHL	24	—	—	—	—	—	—	—	—	12	—	—	—	—	—	—	—
1968–69	North Bay Trappers	NOJHL	42	—	—	—	—	—	—	—	—	5	—	—	—	—	—	—	—
1969–70	North Bay Trappers	NOJHL	30	—	—	—	1786	134	0	5.16	—	3	—	—	—	—	—	—	—
1970–71	North Bay Trappers	NOJHL	36	—	—	—	—	—	—	—	—	3	—	—	—	—	—	—	—
1971–72	North Bay Trappers	NOJHL	46	—	—	—	2745	227	1	4.96	—	6	—	—	—	—	—	—	—
1972–73	Cape Cod Cubs	EHL	14	—	—	—	840	102	0	4.79	—	—	—	—	—	—	—	—	—
1973–74	Macon Whoopees	SHL	19	—	—	—	842	79	1	5.63	—	—	—	—	—	—	—	—	—
1974–75	Cambridge Hornets	OHA Sr	27	—	—	—	1620	114	1	4.22	—	—	—	—	—	—	—	—	—
1975–76	Cambridge Hornets	OHA Sr	21	—	—	—	1260	81	1	3.83	—	—	—	—	—	—	—	—	—
1976–77	Cambridge Hornets	OHA Sr	21	—	—	—	1260	81	3	3.62	—	—	—	—	—	—	—	—	—
1977–78	Cambridge Hornets	OHA Sr	20	—	—	—	1200	77	1	3.91	—	—	—	—	—	—	—	—	—
1978–79	Barrie Flyers	OHA Sr	16	—	—	—	960	82	0	5.13	—	—	—	—	—	—	—	—	—
1979–80	Edmonton Oilers	NHL	1	0	1	0	60	4	0	4.05	.886	—	—	—	—	—	—	—	—
1979–80	Houston Apollos	CHL	4	1	1	0	123	13	0	6.34	—	—	—	—	—	—	—	—	—
1980–81	Milwaukee Admirals	IHL	17	—	—	—	959	78	0	4.88	—	—	—	—	—	—	—	—	—
1980–81	Hampton Aces	EHL	15	—	—	—	716	72	0	6.03	—	—	—	—	—	—	—	—	—
NHL totals			1	0	1	0	60	4	0	4.05	.886	—	—	—	—	—	—	—	—

=== International ===
Year	Team	Event	GP	W	L	T	MIN	GA	SO	GAA	SV%
1980	Canada	OLY	3	1	2	0	122	7	0	3.44	.875
Senior totals			3	1	2	0	122	7	0	3.44	.875

== See also ==
- List of players who played only one game in the NHL
