= 1968 NHL amateur draft =

1968 North American ice hockey draft

General information
- Date: June 13, 1968
- Location: Queen Elizabeth Hotel; Montreal, Quebec, Canada

Overview
- 24 total selections in 3 rounds
- First selection: (Canada) Michel Plasse (Montreal Canadiens)

The 1968 NHL amateur draft was the sixth draft for the National Hockey League. It was held at the Queen Elizabeth Hotel in Montreal.

The last active players in the NHL from this draft class were Gary Edwards and Michel Plasse, who both played their last NHL games in the 1981–82 season.

== Selections by round ==
Below are listed the selections in the 1968 NHL amateur draft.

= NHL All-Star team ·	= NHL All-Star (Note: Players are identified as an All-Star if they were selected for the All-Star game at any time in their career.) ·

=== Round one ===
#	Player	Nationality	NHL team	College/junior/club team
1	Michel Plasse (G)	Canada	Montreal Canadiens	Drummondville Rangers (QJHL)
2	Roger Belisle (C)	Canada	Montreal Canadiens	Montreal North Beavers (LHIQ)
3	Jim Pritchard (D)	Canada	Montreal Canadiens (from Oakland Seals)^{1}	Winnipeg Jets (WCHL)
4	Garry Swain (C)	Canada	Pittsburgh Penguins	Niagara Falls Flyers (OHA)
5	Jim Benzelock (RW)	Canada	Minnesota North Stars	Winnipeg Jets (WCHL)
6	Gary Edwards (G)	Canada	St. Louis Blues	Toronto Marlboros (OHA)
7	Jim McInally (D)	Canada	Los Angeles Kings	Hamilton Red Wings (OHA)
8	Lew Morrison (RW)	Canada	Philadelphia Flyers	Flin Flon Bombers (WCHL)
9	John Marks (LW)	Canada	Chicago Black Hawks	North Dakota Fighting Sioux (NCAA)
10	Brad Selwood (D)	Canada	Toronto Maple Leafs	Niagara Falls Flyers (OHA)
11	Steve Andrascik (RW)	Canada	Detroit Red Wings	Flin Flon Bombers (WCHL)
12	Danny Schock (LW)	Canada	Boston Bruins	Estevan Bruins (WCHL)

Notes

1. The Oakland Seals' first-round pick went to the Montreal Canadiens as the result of a trade on May 21, 1968, that sent Norm Ferguson, Stan Fuller and future considerations (Francois Lacombe and Michel Jacques traded completed in June 1968) to Oakland in exchange for Wally Boyer, Alain Caron, California's 1970 first-round pick, future considerations (Lyle Bradley traded completed in June 1968) and this pick.

=== Round two ===
#	Player	Nationality	NHL team	College/junior/club team
13	Doug Smith (C)	Canada	Oakland Seals	Winnipeg Jets (WCHL)
14	Ron Snell (RW)	Canada	Pittsburgh Penguins	Regina Pats (WCHL)
15	Marc Rioux (C)	Canada	Minnesota North Stars	Verdun Maple Leafs (QJHL)
16	Curt Bennett (LW)	United States	St. Louis Blues	Brown Bears (NCAA)
17	Herb Boxer (RW)	United States	Detroit Red Wings	Michigan Tech Huskies (NCAA)
18	Fraser Rice (C)	Canada	Boston Bruins	Halifax Colonels (MVJHL)
19	Barry Buchanan (D)	Canada	New York Rangers	Weyburn Red Wings (WCHL)

=== Round three ===
#	Player	Nationality	NHL team	College/junior/club team
20	Jim Trewin (D)	Canada	Oakland Seals	Flin Flon Bombers (WCHL)
21	Dave Simpson (D)	Canada	Pittsburgh Penguins	Port Arthur Marrs (TBJHL)
22	Glen Lindsay (G)	Canada	Minnesota North Stars	Saskatoon Blades (WCHL)
23	Don Grierson (RW)	Canada	Montreal Canadiens	North Bay Trappers (NOJHL)
24	Brian St. John (C)	Canada	Boston Bruins	Toronto Varsity Blues (CIAU)

= NHL All-Star team ·	= NHL All-Star ·

== Draftees based on nationality ==
Rank	Country	Number
1	Canada	22
2	United States	2

== See also ==
- 1968–69 NHL season
- List of NHL players
