= Don Grierson (ice hockey) =

Canadian ice hockey player

- Born: June 16, 1947 (age 78) Toronto, Ontario, Canada
- Height: 5 ft 10 in (178 cm)
- Weight: 185 lb (84 kg; 13 st 3 lb)
- Position: Right Wing
- Shot: Right
- Played for: Houston Aeros
- NHL draft: 23rd overall, 1968; Montreal Canadiens
- Playing career: 1968–1977

Donald James Grierson (born June 16, 1947) is a former Canadian professional ice hockey player in the World Hockey Association (WHA).

Born in Toronto, Ontario, Grierson played junior ice hockey for the North Bay Trappers. After one season of junior, he was drafted in the third round (23rd overall) of the 1968 NHL amateur draft by the Montreal Canadiens of the National Hockey League (NHL). Though he was drafted into the NHL, he never played a game there. He spent most of his career in the minors and two seasons (1972–73 and 1973–74) in the World Hockey Association, playing for the Houston Aeros.

== Career statistics ==
=== Regular season and playoffs ===
			Regular season					Playoffs
Season	Team	League	GP	G	A	Pts	PIM	GP	G	A	Pts	PIM
1964–65	Wallaceburg Hornets	WOJBHL	statistics unavailable
1967–68	North Bay Trappers	NOJHL	statistics unavailable
1968–69	Houston Apollos	CHL	60	22	27	49	74	1	0	0	0	0
1969–70	Montreal Voyageurs	AHL	5	0	0	0	0	––	––	––	––	––
1969–70	Denver Spurs	WHL	43	9	11	20	50	––	––	––	––	––
1970–71	Muskegon–Port Huron	IHL	49	15	13	28	84	14	7	6	13	17
1971–72	Port Huron Wings	IHL	72	45	32	77	236	15	6	4	10	43
1972–73	Houston Aeros	WHA	78	22	22	44	83	3	0	0	0	6
1973–74	Houston Aeros	WHA	65	11	18	29	45	14	1	5	6	23
1974–75	Port Huron Flags	IHL	53	21	28	49	156	5	4	2	6	2
1975–76	Baltimore Clippers	AHL	76	37	23	60	71	––	––	––	––	––
1976–77	Erie Blades	NAHL	27	12	18	30	14	9	6	8	14	5
1976–77	Baltimore Clippers	SHL	45	30	45	75	82	––	––	––	––	––
WHA totals			143	33	40	73	128	17	1	5	6	29
