= Couchiching Terriers =

- City: Orillia, Ontario, Canada (1940s-1997); Rama, Ontario, Canada (1997-2010)
- League: Ontario Junior Hockey League; Ontario Provincial Junior A Hockey League; Mid-Ontario Junior B Hockey League; Georgian Bay Junior Hockey League
- Operated: Circa 1940s-2010
- Home arena: Orillia Community Centre Arena; Mnjikaning Arena Sports Ki
- Colours: Black, Red, and White
- General manager: Roy Micks
- Head coach: Bart Crashley
- Affiliates: Barrie Colts (OHL); Alliston Hornets (GMOHL)

Franchise history
- 19xx-1986: Orillia Travelways
- 1987-1989: Orillia Laidlaws
- 1989-1997: Orillia Terriers
- 1997-2010: Couchiching Terriers

The Couchiching Terriers were a Junior A ice hockey team from Rama, Ontario, Canada, a town near Lake Couchiching. The team originated in neighbouring Orillia, Ontario, and played in the Ontario Junior A Hockey League. The Terriers were 1985 Centennial Cup National Champions and three time Dudley Hewitt Cup Central Canadian Champions (1984, 1985, 1986). The team folded in 2010 when offered a buyout from the league.

== History ==
The Junior A team that now boasts the name "Terriers" was previously known as the Orillia Travelways and was a member of the Mid-Ontario Junior B Hockey League from at least 1971 to 1978. The Mid-Ontario league was discontinued in 1978 and the Travelways were added to the Central Junior B Hockey League at that time. They moved up to the Tier II Junior A ranks for the first time in 1981, joining the Ontario Junior Hockey League, and won the 1985 Centennial Cup as the best Junior A team in Canada.

They are not connected with the Orillia Terriers, a different club which competed in the OHA Senior A and Intermediate A ranks from 1968 to 1982.

Orillia was the league's top team, winning three straight playoff championships, but dropped out in 1986 when faulty trusses forced the closing of the Orillia Community Centre. During their absence the Junior A league collapsed, so the team returned to the Central Junior B league in 1987 under the name "Laidlaws" (their sponsor, the Travelways bus line was acquired by Laidlaw transportation). When Laidlaw dropped the sponsorship, they returned to their "Terriers" name in 1989 and returned to Tier II in 1993 when the Central loop became the Ontario Provincial Junior A Hockey League. The Terriers won the new league's first playoff championship in 1994.

At the time of their folding, the Terriers were the official farm team of the Barrie Colts and the parent club of the Alliston Hornets. The Terriers folded due to financial troubles combined with a lack of arena time. The rink in Rama wanted too much money for ice time, so the Terriers wished to move back to Orillia—their original home. Not enough ice time was available at the Orillia rink due to minor hockey needs. The Terriers also wanted to move to Orillia due to the town's deeper interest in junior hockey. Ticket sales in recent years in Rama were weak, but in Orillia, where the Terriers played a handful of games, the arena was near, if not full.

== Season-by-season results ==
Season	GP	W	L	T	OTL	GF	GA	P	Results	Playoffs
Orillia Travelways
1970-71	34	28	3	3	-	258	124	59	1st MOJBHL	
1971-72	40	28	9	3	-	280	177	59	1st MOJBHL	
1972-73	40	9	29	2	-	137	224	20	6th MOJBHL	
1973-74	39	9	29	1	-	142	271	19	5th MOJBHL	DNQ
1974-75	39	12	23	4	-	150	203	28	4th MOJBHL	Lost semi-final
1975-76	36	17	15	4	-	179	177	38	3rd MOJBHL	
1976-77	40	18	20	2	-	166	182	38	3rd MOJBHL	Lost semi-final
1977-78	32	11	19	2	-	170	178	24	4th MOJBHL	
1978-79	44	20	19	5	-	--	--	45	5th CJBHL	
1979-80	44	26	15	3	-	245	201	55	3rd CJBHL	
1980-81	44	16	21	7	-	201	242	39	6th CJBHL	
1981-82	50	11	37	2	-	214	335	24	10th OJHL	
1982-83	48	25	18	5	-	226	196	55	3rd OJHL	
1983-84	42	25	13	4	-	280	196	54	2nd OJHL	Won League, won DHC
1984-85	48	39	7	2	-	346	168	80	1st OJHL	Won League, won DHC, won MCC
1985-86	50	35	15	0	-	305	205	70	1st OJHL	Won League, won DHC
1986-87	Did Not Participate									
Orillia Laidlaws
1987-88	43	16	22	5	-	221	235	37	10th CJBHL	
1988-89	42	30	8	4	-	306	166	64	2nd CJBHL	
Orillia Terriers
1989-90	42	15	16	11	-	191	183	41	7th CJBHL	
1990-91	42	27	10	5	-	238	165	59	1st CJBHL	
1991-92	42	14	19	9	-	221	220	37	12th CJBHL	
1992-93	48	23	21	4	-	273	262	51	10th CJAHL	
1993-94	40	35	2	3	-	252	112	74	1st OPJHL-E	Won League
1994-95	48	18	25	5	-	193	243	42	6th OPJHL-E	
1995-96	50	23	27	0	-	222	233	48	3rd OPJHL-P	
1996-97	50	25	21	4	-	201	194	56	3rd OPJHL-P	
Couchiching Terriers
1997-98	51	23	20	7	1	220	213	54	5th OPJHL-P	
1998-99	51	37	10	4	0	299	193	78	2nd OPJHL-C	
1999-00	49	35	12	2	0	258	152	72	2nd OPJHL-N	
2000-01	49	37	7	3	2	358	176	79	1st OPJHL-N	
2001-02	49	30	15	3	1	236	163	64	2nd OPJHL-N	
2002-03	49	21	23	4	1	178	184	47	5th OPJHL-N	
2003-04	49	18	24	5	2	181	191	43	5th OPJHL-N	
2004-05	49	12	32	3	2	146	224	29	6th OPJHL-N	
2005-06	48	17	22	8	1	146	177	43	5th OPJHL-N	Lost Conf. QF
2006-07	Did Not Participate									
2007-08	49	29	15	-	5	214	159	63	5th OPJHL-N	
2008-09	49	39	3	-	7	267	110	85	1st OJHL-P	
2009-10	56	35	19	-	2	243	190	72	5th OJAHL	Lost quarter-final

=== Playoffs ===
- 1982 DNQ
- 1983 Lost final

Orillia Travelways defeated Markham Waxers 4-games-to-3
Orillia Travelways defeated Newmarket Flyers 4-games-to-3
North York Rangers defeated Orillia Travelways 4-games-to-none

- 1984 Won League, won OHA Buckland Cup, won Dudley Hewitt Cup, lost 1984 Centennial Cup

Orillia Travelways defeated Markham Waxers 4-games-to-none
Orillia Travelways defeated North York Rangers 4-games-to-none
Orillia Travelways defeated Dixie Beehives 4-games-to-1 OJHL CHAMPIONS
Orillia Travelways defeated Rayside-Balfour Canadians (NOJHL) 3-games-to-1 BUCKLAND CUP CHAMPIONS
Orillia Travelways defeated Pembroke Lumber Kings (CJHL) 4-games-to-none DUDLEY HEWITT CUP CHAMPIONS
Weyburn Red Wings (SJHL) defeated Orillia Travelways 4-games-to-3

- 1985 Won League, won OHA Buckland Cup, won Dudley Hewitt Cup, won 1985 Centennial Cup

Orillia Travelways defeated Whitby Lawmen 4-games-to-1
Orillia Travelways defeated Markham Waxers 4-games-to-none
Orillia Travelways defeated Aurora Tigers 4-games-to-none OJHL and BUCKLAND CUP CHAMPIONS
First in 1985 Centennial Cup round robin (3-0) DUDLEY HEWITT CUP CHAMPIONS
Orillia Travelways defeated Penticton Knights (BCJHL) 4-2 in final CENTENNIAL CUP CHAMPIONS

- 1986 Won League, won OHA Buckland Cup, won Dudley Hewitt Cup, lost 1986 Centennial Cup semi-final

Orillia Travelways defeated Newmarket Flyers 4-games-to-1
Orillia Travelways defeated Markham Waxers 4-games-to-1 OJHL CHAMPIONS
Orillia Travelways defeated Onaping Falls Huskies (NOJHL) 4-games-to-2 BUCKLAND CUP CHAMPIONS
Orillia Travelways defeated Brockville Braves (CJHL) 4-games-to-3 DUDLEY HEWITT CUP CHAMPIONS
Third in 1986 Centennial Cup round robin (1-2)
Penticton Knights (BCJHL) defeated Orillia Travelways 7-3 in semi-final

== Notable alumni ==
- Fred Brathwaite
- Tony Hrkac
- Ethan Moreau
- Tim Mason (National Lawn Bowling champion)
- Brent Burns
- Daniel Girardi

Preceded by Weyburn Red Wings	Centennial Cup Champions; 1985	Succeeded by Penticton Knights
