= Mike Hartman =

American ice hockey player (born 1967)

- Born: February 7, 1967 (age 59) Detroit, Michigan, U.S.
- Height: 6 ft 1 in (185 cm)
- Weight: 190 lb (86 kg; 13 st 8 lb)
- Position: Left wing
- Shot: Left
- Played for: Buffalo Sabres; Winnipeg Jets; Tampa Bay Lightning; New York Rangers; Kölner Haie
- National team: United States
- NHL draft: 131st overall, 1986; Buffalo Sabres
- Playing career: 1986–2008
Medal record
Ice hockey
Representing United States
Maccabiah Games
Silver medal – second place	1997 Israel	Ice hockey

Michael Jay Hartman (born February 7, 1967) is an American former professional ice hockey player who played in 397 games in the National Hockey League (NHL) for 13 seasons the Buffalo Sabres, Winnipeg Jets, Tampa Bay Lightning, and New York Rangers. He was drafted in the seventh round, 131st overall, by the Sabres in the 1986 NHL entry draft.

Hartman played Canadian junior hockey with the Belleville Bulls and North Bay Centennials of the Ontario Hockey League, where he compiled 102 points and 473 penalty minutes in 138 games. Hartman represented the United States at the 1987 World Junior Ice Hockey Championships and appeared for the Sabres later that same year, as he amassed six points in 17 National Hockey League (NHL) games. In 1994, he was originally left off the Stanley Cup along with teammate Ed Olczyk because they did not play the 41 regular season games or one game in the finals. Rangers protested saying Hartman and Olczyk had missed time due to injuries, and should be on the Stanley Cup. The NHL agreed and later added their names.

In 1995 he was inducted into the Michigan Jewish Sports Hall of Fame. On April 29, 2012 Hartman was inducted into the National Jewish Sports Hall of Fame and Museum in a ceremony in Commack, N.Y.

== Biography ==
Hartman was born in Detroit, Michigan, and is Jewish. As a youth, he played in the 1980 Quebec International Pee-Wee Hockey Tournament with a minor ice hockey team from Detroit. He graduated from West Bloomfield High School.

He began his career in 1983–84 playing for the North York Rangers in the Ontario Junior Hockey League (OJHL), then in 1984–85 and 1985–86 for the Belleville Bulls in the Ontario Hockey League (OHL), and also in 1985–86 for the North Bay Centennials of the OHL.

Hartman split the following season between Buffalo and their American Hockey League (AHL) affiliate, the Rochester Americans, before becoming a full-time NHL player in 1988–89. That season, Hartman racked up a career-high 316 penalty minutes and added 8 goals. The 1989–90 season proved to be Hartman's best statistically, as he scored a career-high 11 goals and 10 assists and led the Sabres in penalty minutes for the second straight year with 211.

At the beginning of the 1991–92 season, after three full seasons with the Sabres, Hartman was part of a five player swap with the Winnipeg Jets. The Sabres traded Hartman, forward Darrin Shannon and defenceman Dean Kennedy to the Jets in exchange for forward Dave McLlwain, defenceman Gord Donnelly and the Jets' fifth round pick in the 1992 NHL entry draft (Yuri Khmylev). Hartman accounted for eight points and 264 penalty minutes in his only year with the Jets, who left him unprotected in the expansion draft that followed the season.

Hartman was leading the Lightning with 154 penalty minutes. At the trade deadline that season, Hartman was traded to the New York Rangers for forward Randy Gilhen. He played three games at the season of the Rangers. Injuries limited the number of games Hartman played in the next two seasons. He only played 35 games in 1993-94, and a single game for the Rangers in 1994–95. During his time with the Rangers, he scored one goal, one assist and amassed 80 penalty minutes. For his NHL career, Hartman scored 43 goals, added 35 assists and had 1388 penalty minutes in 397 regular season contests.

In 1995, Hartman moved to the International Hockey League's Orlando Solar Bears, where he scored 24 points in 77 games. Hartman played four of his last five professional seasons with the Charlotte Checkers of the ECHL, retiring after the 2003–04 season. The exception was the 1998–99 season, which he spent with Kölner Haie of Germany's Deutsche Eishockey Liga. That season, Hartman also played three games for USA Hockey's qualifying squad which won a berth in the World Championships.

He competed on Team USA in hockey at the 1997 Maccabiah Games in Israel, which won a silver medal.

== Career statistics ==
=== Regular season and playoffs ===
			Regular season					Playoffs
Season	Team	League	GP	G	A	Pts	PIM	GP	G	A	Pts	PIM
1983–84	North York Rangers	OJHL	37	17	26	43	141	—	—	—	—	—
1984–85	Belleville Bulls	OHL	49	13	12	25	119	10	0	1	1	9
1985–86	Belleville Bulls	OHL	4	2	1	3	5	—	—	—	—	—
1985–86	North Bay Centennials	OHL	53	19	16	35	205	10	2	4	6	34
1986–87	North Bay Centennials	OHL	32	15	24	39	144	19	7	8	15	88
1986–87	Buffalo Sabres	NHL	17	3	3	6	69	—	—	—	—	—
1987–88	Rochester Americans	AHL	57	13	14	27	283	4	1	0	1	22
1987–88	Buffalo Sabres	NHL	18	3	1	4	90	6	0	0	0	35
1988–89	Buffalo Sabres	NHL	70	8	9	17	316	5	0	0	0	34
1989–90	Buffalo Sabres	NHL	60	11	10	21	211	6	0	0	0	18
1990–91	Buffalo Sabres	NHL	60	9	3	12	204	2	0	0	0	17
1991–92	Winnipeg Jets	NHL	75	4	4	8	264	2	0	0	0	2
1992–93	Tampa Bay Lightning	NHL	58	4	4	8	154	—	—	—	—	—
1992–93	New York Rangers	NHL	3	0	0	0	6	—	—	—	—	—
1993–94	New York Rangers	NHL	35	1	1	2	70	—	—	—	—	—
1994–95	New York Rangers	NHL	1	0	0	0	4	—	—	—	—	—
1994–95	Detroit Vipers	IHL	6	1	0	1	52		0	0	0	0
1995–96	Orlando Solar Bears	IHL	77	14	10	24	243	21	2	2	4	31
1996–97	Hershey Bears	AHL	42	5	8	13	116	1	0	0	0	0
1997–98	Charlotte Checkers	ECHL	53	30	18	48	79	7	4	0	4	11
1998–99	Kölner Haie	DEL	43	6	3	9	156	—	—	—	—	—
2000–01	Charlotte Checkers	ECHL	16	1	2	3	21	—	—	—	—	—
2002–03	Charlotte Checkers	ECHL	4	1	3	4	7	—	—	—	—	—
2003–04	Charlotte Checkers	ECHL	36	6	4	10	13	—	—	—	—	—
NHL totals			397	43	35	78	1388	21	0	0	0	106

=== International ===
Year	Team	Event	GP	G	A	Pts	PIM
1987	United States	WJC	6	2	0	2	9
Junior totals			6	2	0	2	9

== Awards and achievements ==
- Stanley Cup Champion 1993-94 New York Rangers

== See also ==
- List of select Jewish ice hockey players
