= Rhonda Leeman Taylor =

Canadian ice hockey player

Rhonda Leeman Taylor (born 1953 in Kingston, Ontario) is a former women's ice hockey player and ice hockey administrator from Canada. In 1980, Leeman Taylor became the first salaried female employee of the Ontario Women's Hockey Association (OWHA). Leeman Taylor also served as the chairwoman for the inaugural Women's National Hockey Championships in 1982 and became the first woman to sit on the board of the Canadian Amateur Hockey Association (now known as Hockey Canada). Taylor also sat on the board of the Ontario Women's Hockey Association (OWHA). A book about her career and co-written with her niece, Denbeigh Whitmarsh was released in 2019. Leeman Taylor is also a Kingston and District Sports Hall of Fame member.

== Women's ice hockey ==
=== Playing career ===
In 1948, Canada's Sam Jacks was asked to become director of parks and recreation for the city of North Bay, Ontario, in Northern Ontario. After moving to the city and accepting the position he then became a member of the Northern Ontario Recreation Directors Association (NORDA). Soon after he became instrumental in developing the first Northern Ontario Playground Hockey Association (NOPHA) which encouraged youth to play ice hockey on outdoor rinks. This effort enabled girls and boys more opportunities to play ice hockey, figure skate, and eventually gave opportunity for Canadian girls to play the sport of ringette, which Jacks created with the help of NORDA and the Society of Directors of Municipal recreation of Ontario (SDMRO), an organization where he served as president. As a result of the efforts and activities of the SDMRO, NORDA, and NOPHA, Taylor was provided with the opportunity to not only play ice hockey, but gain access to an administration level of sport later on.

In 1961, the Fitness and Amateur Sport Act came into force in Canada whereby the Government of Canada made an official commitment to "encourage, promote and develop fitness and amateur sport in Canada." A few years later, the Canadian government created two new directorates: Recreation Canada, which was tasked with improving the lifestyle of Canadians, and Sport Canada, which was responsible for developing competitive sport.

=== 1969–1976 ===
==== Kingston Ontario ====
In 1969, at the age of 15, Leeman saw an ad in the Kingston Whig-Standard looking for women to form a community hockey team. The team became the Kingston Red Barons, and would place a stuffed doll of Peanuts character, Snoopy, at centre ice before every game played. In addition to Leeman Taylor, fellow Red Barons players Annabelle Twiddy, Katherine Cartwright, Mary Skeggs eventually became members of the Kingston and District Sports Hall of Fame.

==== Queen's University ====
Following her time with the Red Barons, Leeman played for the Queen's Golden Gaels women's ice hockey program from 1973 to 1976. Known as the "Golden Gals" at the time, the program captured the OWIAA title in the 1974–75 season. After graduation from Queen's University, Leeman Taylor relocated to Kapuskasing, Ontario, launching a women's hockey organization.

== Women's administration ==
In 1976, Taylor graduated from Queen's University in Southern Ontario, then moved to the Northern Ontario town of Kapuskasing where she started a women's ice hockey organization. That same year, she took on a volunteer position with the newly formed Ontario Women's Hockey Association (OWHA). Within three years, Taylor helped the Association grow the number of registered female teams from 101 to 203, travelling throughout the province. Taylor was the first employee hired by Hockey Ontario to assist in the development of the OWHA, which was the floundering at the time. In 1980 she became the first salaried female employee of the Association.

In 1982, Taylor organized the first women's national hockey championships in Canadian history, the Esso Women's Nationals, and served in the role of chairwoman. The inaugural Women's National Hockey Championships in 1982 took place in Brantford, Ontario and secured Shoppers Drug Mart as a sponsor. The final saw teams representing the Canadian provinces of Alberta and Ontario face-off, with attendance of approximately 1,600 fans. That same year, she founded and directed the Female Council, a subsect of the Canadian Amateur Hockey Association, representing female hockey in Canada. The following year in 1983, Leeman Taylor became instrumental in banning contact from all national women's hockey tournaments in Canada.

== Awards and honors ==
- 1974-75: Ontario Women's Intercollegiate Athletics Association (OWIAA) championship
- Class of 1997: Kingston and District Sports Hall of Fame
