= Soo Michigan Realtors =

American junior ice hockey team (1962–1964)

- City: Sault Ste. Marie, Michigan
- League: Northern Ontario Junior Hockey Association
- Operated: 1962–1964
- Home arena: Soo Arena
- Colors: red, black, and white

The Soo Michigan Realtors were an American junior ice hockey team based in Sault Ste. Marie, Michigan, and played in the Northern Ontario Junior Hockey Association from 1962 to 1964. The team was sponsored by realtor Tony Andary, but ceased operations due to lack of junior-aged players.The team placed last in each of its two seasons, was granted a one-year leave of absence in 1964, but did not resume play when the Detroit Red Wings declined to provide players for a farm team.

== Season-by-season results ==
List of results by season:

| Season | Games | Wins | Losses | Ties | Goals for | Goals against | Points | Standings | Playoffs |
|---|---|---|---|---|---|---|---|---|---|
| 1962–63 | 38 | 6 | 32 | 0 | 117 | 265 | 12 | 6th NOJHA | did not qualify |
| 1963–64 | 39 | 4 | 34 | 1 | 122 | 259 | 9 | 6th NOJHA | did not qualify |
