= 1983 Centennial Cup =

Ice hockey competition

1983 Manitoba Centennial Cup
Tournament details
- Venue: North York, Ontario
- Dates: May 1983
- Teams: 2

Final positions
- Champions: North York Rangers (1st title)
- Runners-up: Abbotsford Flyers

Tournament statistics
- Games played: 4

Awards
- MVP: Dennis McCarroll (North York)

The 1983 Centennial Cup is the 13th Junior "A" 1983 ice hockey National Championship for the Canadian Junior A Hockey League.

The Centennial Cup was competed for by the winners of the Abbott Cup/Western Canadian Champions and the Eastern Canadian Jr. A Champions.

The finals were hosted by the North York Rangers in the city of North York, Ontario.

== The Playoffs ==
Regionals
S	Yorkton Terriers	1
M	Dauphin Kings	4
Western Canada
BC	Abbotsford Flyers	4
A	Calgary Canucks	0
OJ	North York Rangers	4
TB	Thunder Bay Kings	0
Eastern Canada
Mar	Halifax Lions	4
IJ	S-P Metros	1

Semi-finals
M	Dauphin Kings	3
BC	Abbotsford Flyers	4
OJ	North York Rangers	4
Mar	Halifax Lions	1

Finals
BC	Abbotsford Flyers	0
OJ	North York Rangers	4

Prior to the Regionals

Abbotsford Flyers (BCJHL) defeated the Williams Lake Mustangs (PCJHL) 2-games-to-none
North York Rangers (OPJHL) defeated Elliot Lake Vikings (NOJHL) 3-games-to-2
Thunder Bay Kings (TBHL) defeated Ottawa Senators (CJHL) 4-games-to-3
Dauphin Kings (MJHL) defeated The Pas Huskies (NMJHL) 3-games-to-none

=== MCC Finals ===
Centennial Cup Results
Game	Team	Score	Team	Score	Notes
1	North York Rangers	9	Abbotsford Flyers	6	Final
2	North York Rangers	8	Abbotsford Flyers	5	Final
3	North York Rangers	10	Abbotsford Flyers	3	Final
4	North York Rangers	10	Abbotsford Flyers	2	Final

== Regional Championships ==
Manitoba Centennial Cup: North York Rangers

Abbott Cup: Abbotsford Flyers
Eastern Champions: North York Rangers

Doyle Cup: Abbotsford Flyers
Anavet Cup: Dauphin Kings
Dudley Hewitt Cup: North York Rangers
Callaghan Cup: Halifax Lions

== Roll of League Champions ==
AJHL: Calgary Canucks
BCJHL: Abbotsford Flyers
CJHL: Ottawa Senators
IJHL: Sherwood-Parkdale Metros
MJHL: Dauphin Kings
MVJHL: Halifax Lions
NBJHL: Moncton Hawks (League defaulted from National Jr. A play)
NMJHL: The Pas Huskies
NOJHL: Elliot Lake Vikings
OJHL: North York Rangers
PCJHL: Williams Lake Mustangs
SJHL: Yorkton Terriers

== Awards ==
Most Valuable Player: Dennis McCarroll (North York Rangers)
Most Sportsmanlike Player: Don McLaughlin (North York Rangers)

== See also ==
- Canadian Junior A Hockey League
- Royal Bank Cup
- Anavet Cup
- Doyle Cup
- Dudley Hewitt Cup
- Fred Page Cup
- Abbott Cup
- Mowat Cup
