= 1985 Centennial Cup =

1985 Manitoba Centennial Cup
Tournament details
- Venue(s): Orillia, Ontario
- Dates: May 1985
- Teams: 4

Final positions
- Champions: Orillia Travelways (1st title)
- Runners-up: Penticton Knights
- Third place: Aurora Tigers
- Fourth place: Cole Harbour Colts

Tournament statistics
- Games played: 8
- Scoring leader: Joe Murphy (Penticton)

Awards
- MVP: Adam Lewis (Orillia)

The 1985 Centennial Cup is the 15th Junior "A" 1985 ice hockey National Championship for the Canadian Junior A Hockey League.

The Centennial Cup was competed for by the winners of the Abbott Cup, Dudley Hewitt Cup, the Callaghan Cup, and a 'Host' team.

The tournament was hosted by the Orillia Travelways in the city of Orillia, Ontario.

== The Playoffs ==
=== Round Robin ===
Pos	League (Ticket)	Team	Pld	W	L	GF	GA	GD	Qualification
1	OJHL (Host/Dudley Hewitt Cup)	Orillia Travelways	3	3	0	25	7	+18	Final
2	BCJHL (Abbott Cup)	Penticton Knights	3	1	2	16	20	−4	Semi-final
3	OJHL (Central Representative)	Aurora Tigers	3	1	2	16	22	−6	Semi-final
4	MVJHL (Fred Page Cup)	Cole Harbour Colts	3	1	2	14	22	−8	

==== Results ====
Orillia Travelways defeated Cole Harbour Colts 8-1
Aurora Tigers defeated Penticton Knights 8-4
Penticton Knights defeated Cole Harbour Colts 9-6
Orillia Travelways defeated Aurora Tigers 11-3
Cole Harbour Colts defeated Aurora Tigers 7-5
Orillia Travelways defeated Penticton Knights 6-3

=== Semi-finals and Final ===
Semi-finals			Royal Bank Cup Finals
			1	Orillia Travelways	4
3	Aurora Tigers	5	2	Penticton Knights	2
2	Penticton Knights	8

== Awards ==
Most Valuable Player: Adam Lewis (Orillia Travelways)
Top Scorer: Joe Murphy (Penticton Knights)
Most Sportsmanlike Player: Joe Murphy (Penticton Knights)

=== All-Star Team ===
Forward

Adam Lewis (Orillia Travelways)
Danton Cole (Aurora Tigers)
Joe Murphy (Penticton Knights)

Defence

Jon Lawson (Orillia Travelways)
Tim Paller (Penticton Knights)

Goal

Dennis Schrapp (Orillia Travelways)

== Roll of League Champions ==
AJHL: Red Deer Rustlers
BCJHL: Penticton Knights
CJHL: Pembroke Lumber Kings
IJHL: Charlottetown Eagles
MJHL: Selkirk Steelers
MVJHL: Cole Harbour Colts
NMJHL: Thompson King Miners
NOJHL: Sudbury Cubs
OJHL: Orillia Travelways
PCJHL: Prince George Spruce Kings
SJHL: Estevan Bruins

== See also ==
- Canadian Junior A Hockey League
- Royal Bank Cup
- Anavet Cup
- Doyle Cup
- Dudley Hewitt Cup
- Fred Page Cup
- Abbott Cup
- Mowat Cup
