= 1979 Centennial Cup =

1979 Manitoba Centennial Cup
Tournament details
- Venue: Prince Albert, Saskatchewan
- Dates: May 1979
- Teams: 3

Final positions
- Champions: Prince Albert Raiders (2nd title)
- Runners-up: Sherwood-Parkdale Metros
- Third place: Guelph Platers

Tournament statistics
- Games played: 7

Awards
- MVP: Dunston Carroll (Sherwood-Parkdale)

The 1979 Centennial Cup is the ninth Tier II Junior "A" 1979 ice hockey National Championship for the Canadian Junior A Hockey League.

The Centennial Cup was competed for by the winners of the Abbott Cup, Dudley Hewitt Cup, and the Callaghan Cup.

The tournament was hosted by the Prince Albert Raiders in the city of Prince Albert, Saskatchewan.

== The Playoffs ==
=== Round Robin ===
| Pos | League (Ticket) | Team | Pld | W | L | GF | GA | GD | Qualification |
|---|---|---|---|---|---|---|---|---|---|
| 1 | SJHL (Abbott Cup) | Prince Albert Raiders | 4 | 3 | 1 | 23 | 18 | +5 | Final |
| 2 | IJHL (Callaghan Cup) | Sherwood-Parkdale Metros | 4 | 2 | 2 | 19 | 24 | −5 | Final |
| 3 | OPJHL (Dudley Hewitt Cup) | Guelph Holoday Platers | 4 | 1 | 3 | 19 | 19 | 0 | |

==== Results ====
Prince Albert Raiders defeated Sherwood-Parkdale Metros 7-2
Sherwood-Parkdale Metros defeated Guelph Holoday Platers 6-5
Prince Albert Raiders defeated Guelph Holoday Platers 5-4
Prince Albert Raiders defeated Sherwood-Parkdale Metros 8-6
Guelph Holoday Platers defeated Prince Albert Raiders 6-3
Sherwood-Parkdale Metros defeated Guelph Holoday Platers 5-4

=== Final ===
| Finals |
| 1 | Prince Albert Raiders | 5 |
| 2 | Sherwood-Parkdale Metros | 4 |

Please note: Overtime final.

== Awards ==
Most Valuable Player: Dunston Carroll (Sherwood-Parkdale Metros)
Most Sportsmanlike Player: Dave Moore (Prince Albert Raiders)

=== All-Star Team ===
Forward

Dunston Carroll (Sherwood-Parkdale Metros)
Eric Ponath (Prince Albert Raiders)
Mike Marquis (Guelph Holoday Platers)

Defence

Brian Ostroski (Sherwood-Parkdale Metros)
Dean Burles (Prince Albert Raiders)

Goal

Mark Davidner (Prince Albert Raiders)

== Roll of League Champions ==
AJHL: Fort Saskatchewan Traders
BCJHL: Bellingham Blazers
CJHL: Hawkesbury Hawks
IJHL: Sherwood-Parkdale Metros
MJHL: Selkirk Steelers
MVJHL: Halifax Lions
NBJHL:
NOJHL: Nickel Centre Native Sons
OPJHL: Guelph Platers
PacJHL: Richmond Sockeyes
QJAHL:
SJHL: Prince Albert Raiders

== See also ==
- Canadian Junior A Hockey League
- Royal Bank Cup
- Anavet Cup
- Doyle Cup
- Dudley Hewitt Cup
- Fred Page Cup
- Abbott Cup
- Mowat Cup
