= Whitby Lawmen =

- City: Whitby, Ontario
- League: Ontario Provincial Junior A Hockey League
- Operated: 1984-1985
- Home arena: Iroquois Park Arena
- Colours: Red, Blue, and White

The Whitby Lawmen are a defunct Junior "A" ice hockey team from Whitby, Ontario, Canada. They were a part of the Ontario Provincial Junior A Hockey League.

== History ==
The Whitby Lawmen joined the OPJHL during its end-times Ontario Hockey Association Junior "A" Hockey League era. After a rocky first season and with the league coming into some turmoil, the Lawmen chose to take a one-year leave from the league. In 1986-87, the team took a look at the situation that the OJHL was in and decided it would be better to fold. At the end of that season, the OJHL folded as well.

== Season-by-season results ==
Season	GP	W	L	T	P	GF	GA	Results	Playoffs
1984–85	48	8	38	2	18	181	374	8th OJHL	Did not qualify

=== Playoffs ===
- 1985 DNQ
