= Abbotsford Flyers =

- City: Abbotsford, British Columbia, Canada
- League: British Columbia Junior Hockey League
- Conference: Coastal Conference
- Founded: 1976

Franchise history
- 1976–1985: Abbotsford Flyers
- 1985–1988: Delta Flyers

Previous franchise history
- 1985–1988: Abbotsford Falcons

The Abbotsford Flyers were a Junior "A" ice hockey team from Abbotsford, British Columbia, Canada. They were a part of the British Columbia Hockey League and played in the Coastal Conference.

== History ==
In 1983, the Flyers avenged a poor playoffs in 1981-82. After sweeping the Burnaby Blue Hawks 4-games-to-none in the quarter-finals, the Flyers beat the New Westminster Royals 4-games-to-2 in the semi-finals, and the Kelowna Buckaroos 4-games-to-1 in the final to win their first and only BCJHL title. In the Mowat Cup, the Flyers defeated the Williams Lake Mustangs of the Peace-Cariboo Junior Hockey League 2-games-to-none to win the BC Jr. A title. Next, in the Alberta/British Columbia Championship, the Flyers beat the Calgary Canucks of the Alberta Junior Hockey League 4-games-to-none. In the Western Canada Final, the Flyers beat Dauphin Kings of the Manitoba Junior Hockey League 4-games-to-2 for the Abbott Cup. In the National Final, the 1983 Centennial Cup the Flyers finally fell to the North York Rangers of the Ontario Junior Hockey League 4-games-to-none.

In 1985, the team moved to Delta, but were replaced by the Falcons. Both teams folded in 1988.

== Season-by-season record ==
Note: GP = Games played, W = Wins, L = Losses, T = Ties, OTL = Overtime losses, GF = Goals for, GA = Goals against

Season	GP	W	L	T	OTL	GF	GA	Points	Finish	Playoffs
1976-77	68	28	37	3	-	302	325	59	4th BCJHL-C	Lost quarter-final
1977-78	66	36	28	2	-	331	284	74	3rd BCJHL-C	Lost quarter-final
1978-79	62	29	31	2	-	352	357	60	3rd BCJHL-C	Lost quarter-final
1979-80	66	22	43	1	-	288	382	45	5th BCJHL-C	DNQ
1980-81	41	22	18	1	-	245	228	45	4th BCJHL-C	Lost final
1981-82	48	35	13	0	-	360	269	70	2nd BCJHL-C	Lost quarter-final
1982-83	56	49	6	1	-	396	203	99	1st BCJHL-C	Won league, won MC, won A/BC, won AC
1983-84	50	20	28	2	-	252	262	42	4th BCJHL-C	Lost quarter-final
1984-85	52	31	20	1	-	349	244	63	3rd BCJHL-C	Lost semi-final
1985-86	52	35	17	0	-	298	224	70	2nd BCJHL-C	Lost semi-final
1986-87	52	29	23	0	-	301	265	58	3rd BCJHL-C	Lost semi-final
1987-88	52	34	17	1	-	316	204	69	2nd BCJHL-C	Lost semi-final

=== Falcons standings ===
Season	GP	W	L	T	OTL	GF	GA	Points	Finish	Playoffs
1985-86	52	15	37	0	-	208	341	30	4th BCJHL-C	Lost quarter-final
1986-87	52	14	38	0	-	217	351	28	6th BCJHL-C	DNQ
1987-88	52	18	33	1	-	267	326	37	6th BCJHL-C	DNQ

== NHL alumni ==
Abbotsford Flyers

- Doug Kostynski
- Larry Lozinski
- Dwight Mathiasen
- Bob McGill
- Larry Melnyk
- Craig Redmond
- Mike Zanier
- Daryl Stanley
- Jim Dobson

Delta Flyers

- Link Gaetz
- Doug MacDonald

Abbotsford Falcons

- Link Gaetz
- Scott King
- Olaf Kolzig

== See also ==
- List of ice hockey teams in British Columbia
