= Michel Plasse =

Canadian ice hockey player (1948–2006)

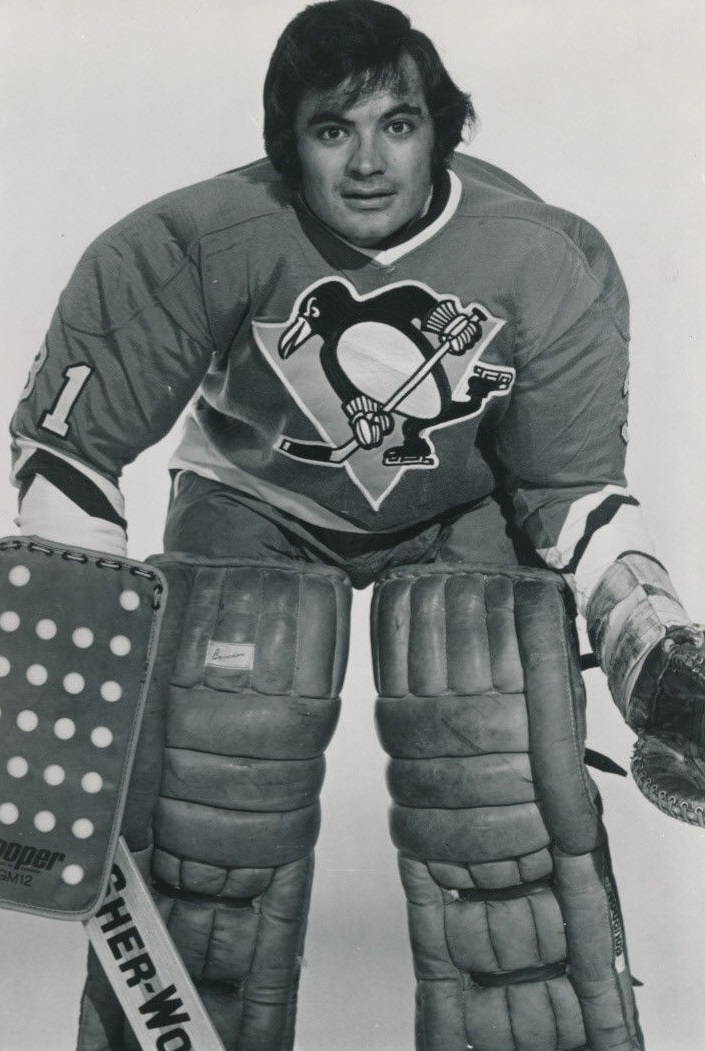
- Plasse with the Pittsburgh Penguins during the 1975–76 season
- Born: June 1, 1948 Montreal, Quebec, Canada
- Died: December 30, 2006 (aged 58) La Visitation-de-l'Île-Dupas, Quebec, Canada
- Height: 5 ft 11 in (180 cm)
- Weight: 175 lb (79 kg; 12 st 7 lb)
- Position: Goaltender
- Caught: Left
- Played for: St. Louis Blues; Montreal Canadiens; Kansas City Scouts; Pittsburgh Penguins; Colorado Rockies; Quebec Nordiques
- NHL draft: 1st overall, 1968; Montreal Canadiens
- Playing career: 1968–1982

Michel Pierre Plasse (June 1, 1948 – December 30, 2006) was a Canadian professional ice hockey goaltender. He played in the National Hockey League from 1970 to 1982. He was selected first overall in the 1968 NHL Amateur Draft by the Montreal Canadiens.

== Playing career ==
Born in Montreal, Quebec, Plasse played in the National Hockey League (NHL) from 1970 to 1982 after being the first overall draft pick in the 1968 NHL Amateur Draft. During his NHL career, he played for the St. Louis Blues (1970–71), Montreal Canadiens (1972–74), Kansas City Scouts (1974–75), Pittsburgh Penguins (1975–76), Colorado Rockies (1976–80), and Quebec Nordiques (1981–1982).

Despite being a first draft pick, Plasse played just sixty minutes in goal for his first club, St. Louis, playing mainly for their affiliate, the Kansas City Blues of the Central Hockey League. On February 21, 1971, the Oklahoma City Blazers were trailing the Blues 2–1 and decided to pull their goaltender. Plasse scored on the open net and became the first professional goalie in the history of the game to score a goal.

Plasse returned to Kansas City as the first pick of the NHL Scouts in the 1974 expansion draft. Plasse attended the draft at Montreal's Queen Elizabeth Hotel.

"All year long, I said I was going to Kansas City. I used to sing that in the locker room to my teammates, 'Kansas City, here I come,'" Plasse told Jay Greenberg of the Kansas City Star. (Icing on the Plains: The Rough Ride of Kansas City's NHL Scouts, pp. 41-42)

In total, Plasse clocked up 16,760 regular season minutes on ice in 299 games, conceding 1,058 goals with an average of 3.79 goals per game. He earned two shutouts, both for Pittsburgh in 1975–76. He played four Stanley Cup playoff games, conceding nine goals in 195 minutes at a rate of 2.77, including one shutout. Plasse won the Stanley Cup with Montreal in 1973.

== Death ==
Plasse died in La Visitation-de-l'Île-Dupas, Quebec of a heart attack on December 30, 2006.

== Career statistics ==
=== Regular season and playoffs ===
			Regular season									Playoffs
Season	Team	League	GP	W	L	T	MIN	GA	SO	GAA	SV%	GP	W	L	MIN	GA	SO	GAA	SV%
1965–66	Drummondville Rangers	QJHL	—	—	—	—	—	—	—	—	—	—	—	—	—	—	—	—	—
1966–67	Drummondville Rangers	QJHL	—	—	—	—	—	—	—	—	—	—	—	—	—	—	—	—	—
1967–68	Drummondville Rangers	QJHL	30	—	—	—	1800	63	3	2.10	—	10	8	2	600	32	1	3.20	—
1967–68	Drummondville Rangers	M-Cup	—	—	—	—	—	—	—	—	—	4	1	3	250	19	0	4.56	—
1968–69	Cleveland Barons	AHL	7	2	4	0	320	27	0	5.40	—	—	—	—	—	—	—	—	—
1969–70	Jacksonville Rockets	EHL	61	—	—	—	3660	297	0	4.87	—	4	0	4	240	35	0	8.75	—
1970–71	St. Louis Blues	NHL	1	1	0	0	60	3	0	3.00	.917	—	—	—	—	—	—	—	—
1970–71	Kansas City Blues	CHL	16	—	—	—	960	42	0	2.63	—	—	—	—	—	—	—	—	—
1971–72	Nova Scotia Voyageurs	AHL	36	—	—	—	2036	94	1	2.77	—	15	12	3	912	19	3	1.25	—
1972–73	Montreal Canadiens	NHL	17	11	2	3	932	40	0	2.58	.912	—	—	—	—	—	—	—	—
1973–74	Montreal Canadiens	NHL	15	7	4	2	839	57	0	4.08	.861	—	—	—	—	—	—	—	—
1974–75	Kansas City Scouts	NHL	24	4	16	3	1420	96	0	4.06	.878	—	—	—	—	—	—	—	—
1974–75	Pittsburgh Penguins	NHL	20	9	5	4	1094	73	0	4.00	.890	—	—	—	—	—	—	—	—
1975–76	Pittsburgh Penguins	NHL	55	24	19	10	3096	178	2	3.45	.890	3	1	2	180	8	1	2.67	.914
1975–76	Hershey Bears	AHL	5	0	4	0	278	25	0	5.40	—	—	—	—	—	—	—	—	—
1976–77	Colorado Rockies	NHL	54	12	29	10	2986	190	0	3.82	.889	—	—	—	—	—	—	—	—
1977–78	Colorado Rockies	NHL	25	3	12	8	1383	90	0	3.90	.871	—	—	—	—	—	—	—	—
1977–78	Hampton Gulls	AHL	2	0	1	1	124	5	0	2.42	—	—	—	—	—	—	—	—	—
1978–79	Colorado Rockies	NHL	41	9	29	2	2302	152	0	3.96	.873	—	—	—	—	—	—	—	—
1978–79	Philadelphia Firebirds	AHL	7	0	6	1	423	31	0	4.39	.854	—	—	—	—	—	—	—	—
1979–80	Colorado Rockies	NHL	6	0	3	2	327	26	0	4.77	.838	—	—	—	—	—	—	—	—
1979–80	Fort Worth Texans	CHL	32	9	13	3	1632	113	0	4.15	—	14	8	5	827	41	1	2.97	—
1980–81	Quebec Nordiques	NHL	33	10	14	9	1933	118	0	3.66	.876	1	0	0	15	1	0	4.00	.833
1981–82	Quebec Nordiques	NHL	8	2	3	1	388	35	0	5.41	.820	—	—	—	—	—	—	—	—
1981–82	Binghamton Whalers	AHL	8	3	3	1	444	32	0	4.32	—	—	—	—	—	—	—	—
NHL totals			299	92	136	54	16,760	1058	2	3.79	.881	4	1	2	195	9	1	2.77	.909

"Plasse's stats". The Goaltender Home Page.

Preceded by Rick Pagnutti	NHL first overall draft pick 1968	Succeeded by Réjean Houle
Preceded by Elgin McCann	Montreal Canadiens first-round draft pick 1968	Succeeded by Réjean Houle
