= North Bay Trappers (1962–1982) =

Canadian junior ice hockey team in North Bay, Ontario

- City: North Bay, Ontario
- League: Northern Ontario Junior Hockey Association (1962–1972); Ontario Provincial Junior A Hockey League (1972–1982)
- Operated: 1962–1982
- Home arena: North Bay Memorial Gardens
- Colours: blue, red, and white

Championships
- Regular season titles: 1964, 1965, 1966
- Playoff championships: 1964, 1966, 1968, 1976

The North Bay Trappers were a junior ice hockey team from North Bay, Ontario, Canada. The team played in the Northern Ontario Junior Hockey Association from 1962 to 1972, and in the Ontario Provincial Junior A Hockey League from 1972 to 1982. Playing for 20 seasons, the Trappers won their league's playoffs championships in 1964, 1966, 1968, and 1976.

== History ==
=== Northern Ontario Junior Hockey Association ===
The Northern Ontario Hockey Association (NOHA) resurrected junior ice hockey in Northern Ontario with a six-team Northern Ontario Junior Hockey Association (NOJHA) for the 1962–63 season. The new league followed the financial failure of the Eastern Professional Hockey League (EPHL), returning junior hockey to the region since the previous league folded prior to World War II. Former National Hockey League (NHL) player Pete Palangio purchased the equipment and jerseys of the defunct North Bay Trappers of the EPHL, and named Howie Parker the team's coach. Palangio and Parker had worked together as the sponsor and coach of the North Bay Junior Trappers and North Bay Rangers teams that won NOHA Junior B championships in the 1960–61 and 1961–62 seasons. The Trappers placed third during the 1962–63 season, won the first round of playoffs 3-games-to-2 versus the Sault Ste. Marie Greyhounds, then lost the NOJHA final in four consecutive games to the Espanola Eagles.

In the 1963–64 season, the Trappers defeated the Espanola Eagles 4-games-to-3 in the first round of the playoffs, after losing game five in overtime then winning the last two games of the series. With a 6–0 victory in game seven, the Trappers won the NOJHA finals 4-games-to-3 versus the Sault Ste. Marie Greyhounds. The Trappers began the Eastern Canada semifinals of the 1964 Memorial Cup the next night, travelling to play the Toronto Marlboros in a best-of-seven series. The series was a difficult challenge since teams in the Ontario Hockey Association (OHA) regularly imported the best players from Northern Ontario, leaving the NOJHA with less talent. Despite scoring the first goal, the Trappers lost the first game by a 3–13 score. Game two of the series was played the next night, and the Trappers lost by a 4–11 score, despite leading 2–1 after the first period. Parker was proud of his players despite the huge difference in operating budget between the teams. Returning to North Bay for the next two games, the Trappers were defeated by a 5–7 score in game three, lost game four by a 4–10 score, being outscored 16 goals to 43 in the series. The NOHA sought changes to future Memorial Cup playoffs to avoid playing the OHA champion in the first round, rather to play the Ottawa District Hockey Association champion. Parker was named coach of the year for the 1963–64 NOJHA season.

Trappers' forward Marty Reynolds received the Pete Palangio Trophy the most valuable player during the 1964–65 NOJHA season, and Parker was again named coach of the year. The Trappers won 4-games-to-3 versus the Espanola Eagles in that season's first round of playoffs, leading the final game at one point by five goals and winning by a 6–5 score. In the NOJHA finals, The Trappers lost game seven at home by a 4–9 score, and lost 4-games-to-3 versus the Garson-Falconbridge Native Sons.

During the 1965–66 season, Marty Reynolds again won the Pete Palangio Trophy the league's most valuable player, then scored 17 goals in that season's playoffs. Placing first in the 1965–66 NOJHA season, the Trappers then defeated the Sudbury Wolves 4-games-to-2 in the playoff's first round. The Trappers won their second NOJHA championship in three seasons when they defeated the Sault Ste. Marie Greyhounds in the finals, with an overtime victory as the visiting team in game six. In the Eastern Canada semifinal of the 1966 Memorial Cup playoffs, the Trappers travelled to play the Oshawa Generals led by the high-scoring Bobby Orr. The Trappers lost game one by a 4–11 score despite leading 2–1 after the first period, then lost game two by a 2–11 score with both of their goaltenders injured. Returning to North Bay, the Trappers lost game three by a 2–12 score, and were defeated 0–10 in the fourth game, and lost the series in four consecutive games. Parker noted that his players felt the series was a "hopless situation", since the OHA continued to take the best players from Northern Ontario. Pete Palangio opposed future Memorial Cup playoffs versus the OHA champion due to financial disadvantages of Northern Ontario teams. Parker suggested that developing players in the north would be possible if the NOHA received financial support from the 1967 NHL expansion teams.

Parker retired as coach after four seasons, and was succeeded by former NHL player Ab DeMarco. In the 1966–67 NOJHA season playoffs, the Trappers defeated the Garson-Falconbridge Combines in seven games in the first round, winning the final game at home by a 9–4 score. Facing the Sault Ste. Marie Greyhounds in the championship series, the Trappers lost in six games. In May 1967, Pete Palangio sold the Trappers to a syndicate including former NHL referee Lou Farelli and player Leo Labine.

Don Grierson led the Trappers in scoring during the 1967–68 season with 40 goals in 40 games. The Trappers won the first round of the playoffs in seven games versus the Sault Ste. Marie Greyhounds, with a 4–2 victory in the final game despite losses in games five and six. With an 8–7 victory, the Trappers won a third NOJHA championship within five seasons by defeating the Sudbury Wolves in six games in the finals. In the Eastern Canada quarterfinal of the 1968 Memorial Cup playoffs, the Trappers played the Central Junior A Hockey League champion Cornwall Royals, instead of the OHA champion. Both teams finished third place in their leagues, with pundits expecting an evenly matched best-of-seven series. Beginning the series in Cornwall, the Trappers lost game one by a 3–10 score. Losing game two by a 4–6 score, DeMarco expected his team to play tougher during the three games of the series in North Bay and use their size advantage. The Trappers responded with a 4–3 victory in game three, including more physical play and a few breaks. Trappers won again in game four with a 5–2 score, coming from behind trailing 0–2 in the first period. Game five played in North Bay saw a season record attendance of 4,205, as the Trappers lost by a 2–5 score. Facing elimination in game six, the Trappers scored three goals in the third period, for a come-from-behind 4–3 victory. In the seventh game, the Trappers conceded four goals in the first period, losing by a 3–8 score, and the series 3-games-to-4.

During his third season as coach, DeMarco retired for health reasons in January 1969, with the Trappers in fourth place of five teams. General manager Lou Farelli assumed coach during on an interim basis, while DeMarco remained as an advisor. In February 1969, assistant general manager became the permanent head coach and won his first two games. He had played senior hockey for the Trappers in the 1956–57 season, and later professionally for the Cleveland Barons In the 1968–69 season playoffs, the Trappers lost to the Sudbury Wolves in six games in the first round. In the 1969–70 season, the Trappers were defeated by the Sault Ste. Marie Greyhounds 4-games-to-1 in the first round of the playoffs.

Beginning the 1970–71 season with only five returning players from the previous season, Hogan resigned as coach due to commitments to his full-time job in December 1970. He was replaced by Neil Forth who had played professionally for the Sudbury Wolves in the EPHL and for the Johnstown Jets. During the 1970–71 season, goaltender Bob Dupuis received the Pete Palangio Trophy as the most valuable player. The Trappers finished in fourth place and lost to the Sault Ste. Marie Greyhounds in four consecutive games in the playoffs.

Forth declined to return for the 1971–72 season due to work commitments. He was succeeded by North Bay native Moe Mantha Sr., who had played in four professional leagues, winning championships in the EPHL, International Hockey League, and Western Hockey League. In the first round of the playoffs, the Trappers were defeated by the Sudbury Wolves in six games.

=== Search for a new league ===
The 1971–72 NOJHA season included only four teams. When the Sault Ste. Marie Greyhounds and Sudbury Wolves moved up to the higher-level OHA Major Junior A Series, and the Chelmsford Canadiens wanted to play in a lower-level Junior B league, the Trappers were the only Northern Ontario team remaining at the Junior A level. The NOHA approved the Trappers to also apply for the OHA Major Junior A Series, or seek membership in the Southern Ontario Junior A Hockey League (SOJHL) which had similar travel distances as the NOJHA. Trappers' management felt its gate receipts did not justify play in a higher-level league amid recent financial losses, and considered applying to the Central Canada Hockey League in Eastern Ontario. When the SOJHL declined the Trappers' application, it appeared that North Bay had no league to play in.

The Ontario Hockey Association (OHA) approved a new Junior A league formed by a core group of teams moving up from the Metro Junior B Hockey League in 1972, and invited entries from North Bay and Kingston, Ontario. The majority of games would be in the Greater Toronto Area, with the league's playoffs champion playing the SOJHL champion in the first round of the Centennial Cup playoffs.

=== Ontario Provincial Junior A Hockey League ===
The Trappers became a charter member of the Ontario Provincial Junior A Hockey League (OPJHL) for the 1972–73 season. With the team struggling to win, Mantha resigned in November 1972, and Lou Farelli coached on interim basis. Later that month when Farelli was suspended for throwing hockey sticks on the ice during a game, the team named one of its board of directors as coach, Murray Mitchell, who formerly played for Queen's Gaels men's ice hockey in university. Mitchell remained as coach for the remainder of the season ended, which saw the Trappers finish in 11th place and not qualify for the playoffs.

Andre Rochefort purchased the Trappers in May 1973, with the intent to bring Tier 1 junior hockey to North Bay. Terry Talentino was named general manager of the Trappers, then hired his son Jim to be the coach, who had played for the Trappers in the 1965–66 season and earned a physical education degree at Ithaca College. During the 1973–74 season playoffs, the Trappers defeated the second-place Toronto Nationals 4-games-to-3 in the quarterfinals. Playing the first-place Wexford Raiders in the semifinals, the Trappers lost the series 4-games-to-3 including a 0–7 score in the final game.

Jim Talentino was dismissed by Rochefort prior to the last game of the 1974–75 season, and Danny Wilkes coached the 1975 playoffs. The Trappers lost 4-games-to-2 to the Seneca Flyers in the first round of the playoffs.

Don Turcotte was named coach for the 1975–76 season, who was considered for the position with Rochefort bought the team in 1973, and since won a city championship coaching high school hockey in North Bay. In the 1975–76 season playoffs, the Trappers defeated the Wexford Raiders 8-points-to-6 in the quarterfinals, winning the final game by a 3–2 score led by goaltender Ray Pilon who stopped 63 shots on net. In the semifinals, the Trappers defeated the Markham Waxers by a 12–7 score in the seventh game to win the series 8-points-to-6. Playing in their first OPJHL final, the Trappers defeated the North York Rangers 9-points-to-7 to win the league championship. Joe Omiccioli of the Trappers was named the playoff's most valuable player. Moving onto the national playoffs for the Centennial Cup, the Trappers lost by a 0–5 score in the first game of an 8-point series versus the SOJHL champion Guelph platers. The Trappers lost by a 2–6 score in game two, and by a 3–4 score in game three despite leading 2–1 early in the third period. The Trappers kept the series alive in game four, with a 3–2 victory led by their goaltender John Bak making 47 saves. The fifth game resulted in a 4–7 loss for the Trappers, who lost the series 2-points-to-8, having played 27 post-season games in 1976.

Seeking another OPJHL championship in the 1976–77 season playoffs, the Trappers faced the Aurora Tigers in the quarterfinals. The Tigers's victory in game one was nullified for using ineligible players. The Trappers led the series 3-games-to-0, lost the next three games, the won game seven by a 4–1 score and won the series 4-games-to-3. By defeating the Markham Waxers 4-games-to-3 in the semifinals, the Trappers set up a rematch of the previous season's final. Playing a second consecutive finals versus the North York Rangers, the Trappers lost the series by 4-games-to-1.

In the 1977–78 season playoffs, the Trappers defeated the North York Rangers by 4-games-to-1 in the quarterfinals, winning the final game by a 9–4 score. The fourth game was protested by North York, resulting in the final 32 seconds being replayed immediately before game five, with the Trappers winning by a 6–4 score. In the semifinals, the Trappers lost to the Guelph Platers by 4-games-to-2.

Turcotte departed after three seasons, then former NHL player and North Bay native Larry Keenan became head coach in the 1978–79 season. He also operated a local fitess club where he planned to keep his players in shape. The Trappers defeated the Newmarket Flyers by 4-games-to-2 in the quarterfinals, then led 3-games-to-1 versus the Dixie Beehives in the semifinals, but lost the next three games and the series in seven games.

The Trappers did not advance beyond the first round of the 1979–80 season playoffs, losing 4-games-to-3 to the Royal York Royals including a 3–10 score in the final game. In the 1980–81 season playoffs, the Trappers defeated the Hamilton Mountain A's by 4-games-to-3 in the quarterfinals. The Trappers then lost to the Belleville Bulls in four consecutive games in the semifinals, scoring only 10 times and conceding 44 goals. Keenan resigned after three seasons of coaching, and having also been general manager for last two seasons, stating that he volunteered his time despite coaching being a full-time workload.

John Horton became coach for the 1981–82 season, moving up from the North Bay juvenile hockey league to lead a team composed mostly of local players. Team owner Rochefort continued to cut costs by using only local players to save on housing out-of-town players. With only seven wins in 41 games and the team already eliminated from playoffs contention, Horton resigned as coach following a disagreement with team management in January 1982. John Barber coached the remaining eleven games, with the Trappers finishing in 11th place for their final season.

=== Displacement by the Ontario Hockey League ===
Trappers' owner Andre Rochefort first applied for Ontario Hockey League (OHL) franchise rights in 1976, and twice attempted purchase of an existing OHL team to relocate to North Bay. Despite four previous applications, the Trappers campaigned to increase its season ticket base to 1,0000 subscribers to pay the $300,000 entry fee for the 1981–82 OHL season, but abandoned the fifth attempt with only 376 season ticket commitments. The OHL denied the bid since Rochefort wanted to spread out the expansion fee over six seasons rather than pay upfront.

Rochefort had a strained relation with North Bay city council who asked for a $750 guarantee from the team. He also denied rumors of moving home games away from the Memorial Gardens. Unable to agree on terms to renew the Trappers' lease at the Memorial Gardens, the city entered negotiations with Reg Quinn who owned the Niagara Falls Flyers and wanted to relocate that team. Despite objections by the Trappers, the city and the OHL signed a three-year lease with the North Bay Centennials as of the 1982–83 season. The Parks and Recreation Department chairman stated that the city had waited a long time for an OLH team, and they had no contractual obligation to the Trappers.

The Trappers filed a grievance with the OHA for infringement of territorial rights. The OHA felt that the Trappers should be compensated by the OHL, but had no authority to enforce it. Despite multiple meetings about the grievance, the OHL stood firm on its decision to move into North Bay. The Trappers became defunct despite rumours of Rochefort seeking a court injunction to prevent the Centennials' home opener versus the Kingston Canadians on September 23, 1982.

== Season-by-season results ==
- Northern Ontario Junior Hockey Association (NOJHA) results (1962–1972):
- Ontario Provincial Junior A Hockey League (OPJHL) results (1972–1981):
- Ontario Junior A Hockey League (OJAHL) results (1981–1982):

Regular season champions	League playoffs champions

Regular season										Playoffs			
Season	Coach(es)	Games	Wins	Losses	Ties	Goals for	Goals against	Points	Standing	NOJHA semifinals	NOJHA finals	Eastern Canada quarterfinals	Eastern Canada semifinals
1962–63	Parker	40	24	15	1	231	165	49	3rd NOJHA	W, 3–2, Sault Ste. Marie	L, 0–4, Espanola	—	—
1963–64	Parker	40	28	12	0	263	144	56	1st NOJHA	W, 4–3, Espanola	W, 4–3, Sault Ste. Marie	—	L, 0–4, Toronto
1964–65	Parker	40	25	13	2	255	184	52	1st NOJHA	W, 4–3, Espanola	L, 3–4, Garson-Falconbridge	—	—
1965–66	Parker	40	27	12	1	246	173	55	1st NOJHA	W, 4–2, Sudbury	W, 4–2, Sault Ste. Marie	—	L, 0–4, Oshawa
1966–67	DeMarco	40	25	15	0	238	168	50	2nd NOJHA	W, 4–3, Garson-Falconbridge	L, 2–4, Sault Ste. Marie	—	—
1967–68	DeMarco	40	21	19	0	195	177	42	3rd NOJHA	W, 4–3, Sault Ste. Marie	W, 4–2, Sudbury	L, 3–4, Cornwall	—
1968–69	DeMarco/Hogan	48	20	27	1	211	230	41	4th NOJHA	L, 2–4, Sudbury	—	—	—
1969–70	Hogan	48	23	23	2	247	259	48	3rd NOJHA	L, 1–4, Sault Ste. Marie	—	—	—
1970–71	Hogan/Forth	48	14	32	2	161	249	30	4th NOJHA	L, 0–4, Sault Ste. Marie	—	—	—
1971–72	Mantha	52	14	33	5	169	278	33	4th NOJHA	L, 2–4, Sudbury	—	—	—
NOJHA totals		436	221	201	14	2216	2027	456	—	10 playoffs appearances, 3 championships			
Season	Coach(es)	Games	Wins	Losses	Ties	Goals for	Goals against	Points	Standing	OPJHL quarterfinals	OPJHL semifinals	OPJHL finals	All-Ontario championship
1972–73	Mantha/Mitchell	44	13	29	2	213	283	28	11th OPJHL	did not qualify			
1973–74	Talentino	44	21	19	4	264	250	46	7th OPJHL	W, 4–3, Toronto	L, 3–4, Wexford	—	—
1974–75	Talentino/Wilkes	44	22	18	4	238	208	48	8th OPJHL	L, 2–4, Seneca	—	—	—
1975–76	Turcotte	44	27	13	4	247	189	58	2nd OPJHL	W, 8–6, Wexford	W, 8–6, Markham	W, 9–7, North York	L, 2–8, Guelph
1976–77	Turcotte	44	27	11	6	287	201	60	2nd OPJHL	W, 4–3, Aurora	W, 4–3, Markham	L, 1–4, North York	—
1977–78	Turcotte	50	27	16	7	285	245	61	4th OPJHL	W, 4–1, North York	L, 2–4, Guelph	—	—
1978–79	Keenan	50	33	14	3	313	224	69	3rd OPJHL	W, 4–2, Newmarket	L, 3–4, Dixie	—	—
1979–80	Keenan	44	22	17	5	228	181	49	6th OPJHL	L, 3–4, Royal York	—	—	—
1980–81	Keenan	44	22	22	0	240	253	44	6th OPJHL	W, 4–3, Hamilton	L, 0–4, Belleville	—	—
1981–82	Horton/Barber	50	8	38	4	206	403	20	11th OJAHL	did not qualify			
OPJHL totals		458	222	197	39	2521	2437	483	—	8 playoffs appearances, 1 championship			

== Notable players ==
Bill Barber played for the Trappers during the 1967–68 and 1968–69 seasons, won the Stanley Cup twice, and was inducted into the Hockey Hall of Fame.

Three players were drafted from the Trappers into the National Hockey League (NHL) or World Hockey Association (WHA):

- Don Grierson chosen in the third round of the 1968 NHL amateur draft (23rd overall) by the Montreal Canadiens.
- Brian Kuruliak chosen in the ninth round of the 1974 NHL amateur draft (145th overall) by the Kansas City Scouts.
- Mitch Babin chosen in the eleventh round of the 1974 NHL amateur draft (180th overall) by the St. Louis Blues.
- Mitch Babin chosen in the fourteenth round of the 1974 WHA amateur draft (189th overall) by the Indianapolis Racers.

List of notable players (seasons in parentheses):

- Mitch Babin (1972–1974)
- John Baby (1973–74)
- Bill Barber (1967–1969)
- Mike Bloom (1968–69)
- Randy Boyd (1978–79)
- Ab DeMarco Jr. (1964–1967)
- Peter Driscoll (1972–73)
- Bob Dupuis (1967–1972)
- Jim Fox (1975–1977)
- Gaston Gingras (1974–75)
- Don Grierson (1967–68)
- Claude Noël (1973–74)
- Gerry Rioux (1975–76)
