= 1982 Centennial Cup =

1982 Manitoba Centennial Cup
Tournament details
- Venue: Prince Albert, Saskatchewan
- Dates: May 1982
- Teams: 2

Final positions
- Champions: Prince Albert Raiders (4th title)
- Runners-up: Guelph Platers

Tournament statistics
- Games played: 4

Awards
- MVP: Carl Van Camp (Prince Albert)

The 1982 Centennial Cup is the 12th Junior "A" 1982 ice hockey National Championship for the Canadian Junior A Hockey League.

The Centennial Cup was competed for by the winners of the Abbott Cup/Western Canadian Champions and the Eastern Canadian Jr. A Champions.

The finals were hosted by the Prince Albert Raiders in the city of Prince Albert, Saskatchewan.

== The Playoffs ==
Regional Semi-finals	Regional Finals
BC	Penticton Knights	2
PC	Williams Lake Mustangs	0
BC	Penticton Knights	2
A	St. Albert Saints	4
Western Canada
S	Prince Albert Raiders	4
M	Winnipeg South Blues	2
Man	Winnipeg South Blues	3
NM	Flin Flon Bombers	0
HNO	Thunder Bay Kings	0
OJ	Guelph Platers	3
OJ	Guelph Platers	4
CJ	Pembroke L. Kings	0
CJ	Pembroke L. Kings	4
Q	La Prairie Flames	1
Eastern Canada
NB	Moncton Hawks	4
IJ	North River N. Stars	2
IJ	North River N. Stars	4
MV	Halifax Lions	3

Semi-finals
A	St. Albert Saints	1
S	Prince Albert Raiders	4
OJ	Guelph Platers	4
NB	Moncton Hawks	1

Centennial Cup
S	Prince Albert Raiders	4
OJ	Guelph Platers	0

=== Additional playdowns ===
Ontario Hockey Association Championship

Guelph Platers (OJ) defeated Onaping Falls Huskies (NO) 3-games-to-none

=== MCC Finals ===
Centennial Cup Results
Game	Team	Score	Team	Score	Notes
1	Prince Albert Raiders	9	Guelph Platers	4	Final
2	Prince Albert Raiders	7	Guelph Platers	3	Final
3	Prince Albert Raiders	6	Guelph Platers	3	Final
4	Prince Albert Raiders	8	Guelph Platers	4	Final

== Regional Championships ==
Manitoba Centennial Cup: Prince Albert Raiders

Abbott Cup: Prince Albert Raiders
Eastern Champions: Guelph Platers

Doyle Cup: St. Albert Saints
Anavet Cup: Prince Albert Raiders
Dudley Hewitt Cup: Guelph Platers
Callaghan Cup: Moncton Hawks

== Roll of League Champions ==
AJHL: St. Albert Saints
BCJHL: Penticton Knights
CJHL: Pembroke Lumber Kings
IJHL: North River North Stars
MJHL: Winnipeg South Blues
MVJHL: Halifax Lions
NBJHL: Moncton Hawks
NMJHL: Flin Flon Bombers
NOJHL: Onaping Falls Huskies
OJHL: Guelph Platers
PCJHL: Prince George Spruce Kings
QJAHL: La Prairie Flames
SJHL: Prince Albert Raiders

== Awards ==
Most Valuable Player: Carl Van Camp (Prince Albert Raiders)
Most Sportsmanlike Player: Carl Van Camp (Prince Albert Raiders)

=== All-Star Team ===
Forward

Carl Van Camp(Prince Albert Raiders)
Bill Watson (Prince Albert Raiders)
Barcley Rocheleau (Prince Albert Raiders)

Defence

Dave Reierson (Prince Albert Raiders)
Peter Herms (Guelph Platers)

Goal

Darryl Pierce (Prince Albert Raiders)

== See also ==
- Canadian Junior A Hockey League
- Royal Bank Cup
- Anavet Cup
- Doyle Cup
- Dudley Hewitt Cup
- Fred Page Cup
- Abbott Cup
- Mowat Cup
