= Sherwood-Parkdale Metros =

- City: Sherwood, Prince Edward Island
- League: Island Junior Hockey League
- Operated: circa 1970–1991
- Home arena: Sherwood Arena

Franchise history
- circa 1970–1974: Sherwood-Parkdale Lions
- 1974–1989: Sherwood-Parkdale Metros
- 1989–1991: Sherwood-Parkdale Kings

The Sherwood-Parkdale Metros were a Canadian Junior ice hockey team from Sherwood, Prince Edward Island. They were one-time Centennial Cup National finalists.

== History ==
The Sherwood-Parkdale Metros were founded in the early to mid-1970s as members of Prince Edward Island's Island Junior Hockey League. They were a Tier II Junior "A" club and were eligible for the Centennial Cup.

In 1979, the Metros were the top of the Island Junior Hockey League. They ended up winning the Eastern Canada Junior A championship and entered into the 1979 Centennial Cup in Prince Albert, Saskatchewan. The Metros were up against the Central Champion Guelph Platers of the Ontario Provincial Junior A Hockey League and the Western Champion Prince Albert Raiders of the Saskatchewan Junior Hockey League. In their first game they lost to Prince Albert 7–2, but beat Guelph 6–5 in the second game. They lost their third game to Prince Albert 8–6. The fourth game was do-or-die, the winner went to the final while the loser went home. The Metros were victorious as they beat Guelph 5–4 to move on to a one-game final for the national championship against the Raiders. The Metros took the Raiders to overtime in the final, but fell 5–4.

In 1980, again the Metros won the IJHL. They won the Eastern Canadian championship and moved on to the 1980 Centennial Cup in North York, Ontario. They started out the round robin with a 7–6 double overtime win over the North York Rangers on the OPJHL. Then they played Brent Sutter and the Red Deer Rustlers of the Alberta Junior Hockey League, losing 6–0. In the third game they lost to North York 4–3 to set up a fourth game that would either make or break the Metros. They forced overtime against the Rustlers, but lost 7–6 in the second period of extra time—ending their tournament.

In 1989, the team changed its name to the Sherwood-Parkdale Kings. In 1991, the Summerside Western Capitals and Charlottetown Abbies vacated the Island Junior Hockey League to join the Metro Valley Junior Hockey League in Nova Scotia, thus creating the Maritime Junior A Hockey League. The Kings folded.

== Season-by-Season record ==
Season	GP	W	L	T	OTL	GF	GA	P	Results	Playoffs
1971–72	27	3	24	0	-	74	193	6	6th IJBHL	
1972–73	39	15	19	5	-	154	159	35	3rd IJBHL	
1973–74	29	18	8	3	-	157	100	39	2nd IJHL	
1974–75	40	19	18	3	-	185	196	41	4th IJHL	
1975–76	39	24	12	3	-	220	163	51	2nd IJHL	
1976–77	40	33	5	2	-	267	137	68	1st IJHL	
1977–78	40	22	13	5	-	--	--	49	3rd IJHL	
1978–79	39	26	7	6	-	276	136	58	2nd IJHL	Won League
1979–80	40	31	5	4	-	390	154	66	1st IJHL	Won League
1980–81	34	19	11	4	-	215	196	42	1st IJHL	
1981–82	42	18	17	7	-	263	285	43	3rd IJHL	
1982–83	42	19	16	7	-	273	235	45	2nd IJHL	
1983–84	40	9	26	5	-	189	262	23	3rd IJHL	
1984–85	38	18	14	6	-	177	164	42	1st IJHL	
1985–86	36	20	11	5	-	225	172	45	1st IJHL	Lost Final
1986–87	42	20	18	4	-	205	189	44	2nd IJHL	
1987–88	42	16	16	10	-	254	240	42	2nd IJHL	
1988–89	44	17	20	7	-	205	231	46	3rd IJHL	
1989–90	40	24	12	3	1	188	153	52	3rd IJHL	
1990–91	42	33	5	3	1	209	157	70	1st IJHL	

== See also ==
- List of ice hockey teams in Prince Edward Island
