= 1982 in ice hockey =

The following is a chronicle of events during the year 1982 in ice hockey.

== National Hockey League ==
- Art Ross Trophy as the NHL's leading scorer during the regular season: Wayne Gretzky, Edmonton Oilers
- Hart Memorial Trophy: for the NHL's Most Valuable Player: Wayne Gretzky, Edmonton Oilers
- Stanley Cup - New York Islanders defeat the Vancouver Canucks 4 games to 0. The 1982 Finals took place under a revised NHL divisional alignment and playoff structure, which de facto revived the "East vs. West" format for the Finals

== Canadian Hockey League ==
- Ontario Hockey League: Kitchener Rangers won J. Ross Robertson Cup.
- Quebec Major Junior Hockey League: Sherbrooke Castors won President's Cup (QMJHL) for the third time in team history
- Western Hockey League: Portland Winter Hawks won President's Cup (WHL) for the first time in team history
- Memorial Cup: Kitchener Rangers defeat the Sherbrooke Castors

== World Hockey Championship ==
  - Men's champion: The Soviet Union captured the gold medal in the 1982 Ice Hockey World Championships. Czechoslovakia gained the silver medal, while the Canadian team, with Wayne Gretzky on their roster, obtained bronze.
  - Junior Men's champion: At the 1982 World Junior Ice Hockey Championships, Canada won its first ever gold medal in tournament history.

== Minor League hockey ==
- American Hockey League: The New Brunswick Hawks win the Calder Cup.
- IHL: The Toledo Goaldiggers win the Turner Cup.

== Women's ice hockey ==
- Canada: The inaugural Women's National Hockey Championships in 1982. The final, held in Brantford, Ontario, saw Alberta and Ontario face-off, with attendance of approximately 1,600 fans.
- Canada: Rhonda Leeman Taylor founded and directed the Female Council, a subsect of the Canadian Amateur Hockey Association, representing female hockey in Canada.

== Season articles ==
| 1981–82 NHL season | 1982–83 NHL season |
| 1981–82 AHL season | 1982–83 AHL season |

== See also ==
- 1982 in sports
