= Northern Ontario Junior Hockey Association =

Defunct junior ice hockey league

- Countries: Canada; United States
- Regions: Northeastern Ontario; Upper Peninsula Michigan
- Founded: 1962
- Folded: 1972
- No. of teams: 4–6
- Championship: George Richardson Memorial Trophy
- Most successful club: Sault Ste. Marie Greyhounds

The Northern Ontario Junior Hockey Association (NOJHA) was a Junior A ice hockey league based in Northeastern Ontario, Canada. The league lasted from 1962 until 1972 and competed for the Memorial Cup from 1962 until 1970 and the Manitoba Centennial Trophy from 1970 until 1972.

== History ==
The Northern Ontario Junior Hockey Association was founded in 1962 at the Caswell Espanola Hotel in Espanola, Ontario. Founded with five Northern Ontario communities and one Northern Michigan team, the league was founded in an effort to stop the flow of Northern Ontario talent from going to the OHA Junior A Hockey League and the various Junior B leagues. The NOJHA was a top tier Junior A hockey league and was eligible to compete for the Memorial Cup, the trophy of Canadian junior hockey supremacy.

The original six teams of the NOJHA were the Sault Ste. Marie Greyhounds, Sudbury Wolves, North Bay Trappers, Garson-Falconbridge Native Sons, Espanola Eagles, and Soo Michigan Realtors. By 1964, Soo Michigan dropped from the league. In 1969, the Native Sons moved to become the Chelmsford Canadiens.

In 1970, there was a massive shift in junior hockey. The NOJHA found itself relegated to a new level of hockey known as Tier II Junior A.

In 1971, the Espanola Eagles dropped from the league to the newly formed NOHA Junior B Hockey League. A season later, the entire NOJHA was forced to fold. With only four teams remaining, Sault Ste. Marie and Sudbury sought moves to the Ontario Major Junior Hockey League and were accepted. At the same time, North Bay applied for acceptance into the newly formed Ontario Provincial Junior A Hockey League, another Tier II league, and were accepted. With one team remaining, the league closed its doors. The remaining team, Chelmsford, followed Espanola's lead and joined the NOHA Junior B Hockey League.

In 1978, the NOHA Junior B Hockey League was promoted to Tier II Junior A status and renamed the Northern Ontario Junior Hockey League.

=== Eastern Memorial Cup play ===
This is a complete list of Memorial Cup play for NOJHA teams. In eight years, the NOJHA failed to win a single series despite close calls in 1967 and 1968.

1962-63 Finals

Niagara Falls Flyers (OHA) defeated Espanola Eagles 4-games-to-none

1963-64 Semi-finals

Toronto Marlboros (OHA) defeated North Bay Trappers 4-games-to-none

1964-65 Semi-finals

Niagara Falls Flyers (OHA) defeated Garson-Falconridge Native Sons 4-games-to-none

1965-66 Semi-finals

Oshawa Generals (OHA) defeated North Bay Trappers 4-games-to-none

1966-67 Quarter-finals

Cornwall Royals (OHDJHL) defeated Sault Ste. Marie Greyhounds 4-games-to-3

1967-68 Quarter-finals

Cornwall Royals (OHDJHL) defeated North Bay Trappers 4-games-to-3

1968-69 Quarter-finals

Sorel Black Hawks (QJAHL) defeated Sudbury Wolves 4-games-to-none

1969-70 Semi-Finals

Montreal Junior Canadiens (OHA) defeated Sault Ste. Marie Greyhounds 4-games-to-1

=== Eastern Centennial Cup play ===
This is a complete list of Centennial Cup play for NOJHA teams. In two years, the NOJHA failed to win a series.

1970-71 Quarter-finals

Thunder Bay Marrs (TBJHL) defeated Sudbury Wolves 4-games-to-3

1971-72 Quarter-finals

Guelph CMC's (SOJHL) defeated Sault Ste. Marie Greyhounds 3-games-to-none

== Teams ==
- Chelmsford Canadiens/Garson-Falconbridge Native Sons
- Espanola Eagles
- North Bay Trappers
- Sault Ste. Marie Greyhounds
- Soo Michigan Realtors
- Sudbury Wolves

== Regular season champions ==
- 1963 Sault Ste. Marie Greyhounds
- 1964 North Bay Trappers
- 1965 North Bay Trappers
- 1966 North Bay Trappers
- 1967 Sault Ste. Marie Greyhounds
- 1968 Sault Ste. Marie Greyhounds
- 1969 Sault Ste. Marie Greyhounds
- 1970 Sault Ste. Marie Greyhounds
- 1971 Sudbury Wolves
- 1972 Sault Ste. Marie Greyhounds

== Playoff champions ==
- 1963 Espanola Eagles
- 1964 North Bay Trappers
- 1965 Garson-Falconbridge Native Sons
- 1966 North Bay Trappers
- 1967 Sault Ste. Marie Greyhounds
- 1968 North Bay Trappers
- 1969 Sudbury Wolves
- 1970 Sault Ste. Marie Greyhounds
- 1971 Sudbury Wolves
- 1972 Sault Ste. Marie Greyhounds
