= Prince Albert Raiders =

Western Hockey League team in Prince Albert, Saskatchewan

- City: Prince Albert, Saskatchewan
- League: Western Hockey League
- Conference: Eastern
- Division: East
- Founded: 1971
- Home arena: Art Hauser Centre
- Colours: Green, black, gold
- General manager: Curtis Hunt
- Head coach: Ryan McDonald
- Website: chl.ca/whl-raiders/

Franchise history
- 1971–1982: Saskatchewan Junior Hockey League
- 1982–present: Western Hockey League

Championships
- Regular season titles: 2 (1984–85, 2018–19) Conference Championships; 2 (2018-19, 2025–26)
- Division titles: 7 (1984–85, 1991–92, 1998–99, 2018–19, 2019–20, 2024–25, 2025–26)
- Playoff championships: Ed Chynoweth Cup; 2 (1985, 2019); Memorial Cup 1 (1985)

Current uniform

The Prince Albert Raiders are a Canadian major junior ice hockey team based in Prince Albert, Saskatchewan. Founded in 1971 as a member of the Saskatchewan Junior Hockey League, the Raiders have been members of the Western Hockey League since 1982. They play in the East Division of the Eastern Conference and host games at the Art Hauser Centre. The Raiders are two-time Ed Chynoweth Cup winners, and won the Memorial Cup as Canadian junior champions in 1985.

== History ==
=== Founding and SJHL dynasty ===
The Raiders were founded as a Saskatchewan Junior Hockey League (SJHL) club in 1971, playing out of the newly constructed Prince Albert Communiplex, later renamed the Art Hauser Centre. The Raiders quickly established themselves as one of the most successful Tier II junior clubs in Canada. The team won seven consecutive Anavet Cups from 1976 to 1982, defeating Manitoba Junior Hockey League champions for the right to play for the national championship. Prince Albert went on to win the national championship, the Centennial Cup, four times between 1977 and 1982. In this era, the Raiders competed against a number of future Ontario Hockey League teams, including the Guelph Platers and the Belleville Bulls. The team's early success came under manager and coach Terry Simpson—former player James Patrick called the coach "synonymous with winning and competing"—and he remained coach when the team moved up to the top junior ranks by joining the WHL in 1982.

=== Joining the WHL ===
The Raiders' first year in the WHL was a challenging one—the team finished last in the East Division and missed the playoffs. However, Dan Hodgson was named the league's rookie of the year, and the team rapidly improved under Simpson's guidance. The Raiders made the playoffs in their second season, and were a bona fide contender by their third year in the league, boasting a defensive star in Manny Viveiros and future National Hockey League players such as Dave Manson and Ken Baumgartner. Hodgson, now captain, finished second in the league in scoring in 1984–85, and helped pace the Raiders to 58 wins and the league's best regular season record. In the playoffs, the Raiders lost only one game en route to their first league championship, securing the President's Cup with a sweep of the Kamloops Blazers. The Raiders thus earned a spot in the 1985 Memorial Cup.

The Memorial Cup tournament also featured the Sault Ste. Marie Greyhounds, the Verdun Junior Canadiens, and the Shawinigan Cataractes. In an opening game that featured 108 minutes in penalties, Prince Albert lost 6–2 to Shawinigan. The second game saw the Raiders beat Verdun 5–3 with 2 goals from defenceman Dave Goertz. In their third game, the Raiders defeated Sault Ste. Marie 8–6; Hodgson had 5 assists in the match. The Raiders and Greyhounds would play each other again in the semi-finals, and Prince Albert would prevail again by a score of 8–3. The Raiders became national champions by defeating the Cataractes 6–1 in the final. The Memorial Cup victory capped off a decade-long run in which the Raiders won five national championships.

The following season, the Raiders finished second overall before losing the Division Final in seven games to the Medicine Hat Tigers. Simpson won his second coach-of-the-year award, and then left the team to coach the New York Islanders, marking the end of an era. Simpson would return for a single season in 1989–90 before leaving again for the NHL.

=== Post-Simpson era ===
The Raiders remained competitive for much of the next decade, including another four runs to the division playoff final between 1990 and 1996. However, despite boasting future NHL players such as Mike Modano, Shane Hnidy, Scott Hartnell, Kyle Chipchura, and Josh Morrissey, the next 22 seasons would see the Raiders win only four playoff series—and none between 2005 and 2019—missing the playoffs altogether eleven times.

=== Habscheid era ===
Marc Habscheid joined the team as coach in 2014, and he worked to rebuild the team into a contender. That work paid off by 2018, when the Raiders began their most successful season in more than two decades. Led by Brett Leason, Noah Gregor, and Ian Scott, 2018–19 saw the Raiders put together their first 100-point season since 1995–96 and their best since 1984–85, securing their second Scotty Munro Trophy as regular season champions. They had a longer road in the playoffs than in 1985, culminating in a seven-game championship series against the Vancouver Giants, a series in which they led 3 games to 1. The Raiders won their second WHL title with a 3–2 game 7 overtime win over the Giants, with Dante Hannoun scoring the overtime winner. The win sent the Raiders to their second Memorial Cup tournament, where they were knocked out in the preliminary round.

Led by the team's first 18-year old captain in Kaiden Guhle, the Raiders had another strong season in 2019–20; however, with the team atop the East Division, the season was cut short and the playoffs cancelled due to the COVID-19 pandemic, ending the Raiders' hopes of repeating. The team participated in a shortened 2020–21 campaign featuring only East Division opponents. Due to the modified campaigns, the Raiders were the last team to win the Ed Chynoweth Cup at when the 2021–22 campaign began.

Kyle Chipchura with the Raiders in 2005. Chipchura served as captain in 2005–06.

== Logos and uniforms ==
The Raiders originally wore green and yellow uniforms with a logo featuring a skating hockey player. From 1985 until the mid-1990s, the team adopted imagery featuring an Arab mascot wielding a scimitar. Although the team moved away from this look in 1996—adopting black as its primary colour and a new logo featuring a pirate's head—the Raiders stirred controversy in the twenty-first century by bringing back elements of branding from the era. In 2014, the team faced criticism for introducing a mascot that was a caricature of an Arab man; the team ultimately retired the mascot and would late introduce a parrot mascot in its place. In 2021, the team forced the WHL to apologize when it brought back its 1980s jerseys as a third-jersey; the move was called "insensitive and offensive".

The Raiders re-adopted green as the primary colour in 2013, and ditched the pirate logo in favour of a sword-and-shield logo featuring "PA" initials. A new third jersey introduced in 2022 paid homage to the pirate era.

Like many junior teams, the Raiders frequently adopt limited-edition and special-event jerseys. In 2024, the team temporarily re-branded as the Cobra Chickens, unveiling a new jersey featuring a Canada goose logo.

== Championships ==
Memorial Cups

- 1985

Ed Chynoweth Cups

- 1985, 2019

Playoff Division/Conference Champions

- 1985, 2019, 2026

Scotty Munro Memorial Trophies

- 1985, 2019

Regular season Division Champions

- 1985, 1992, 1999, 2019, 2020, 2025, 2026

Centennial Cup Champions

- 1977, 1979, 1981, 1982

Abbott Cup Champions

- 1977, 1978, 1979, 1981, 1982

Anavet Cup Champions

- 1976, 1977, 1978, 1979, 1980, 1981, 1982

Saskatchewan Junior Hockey League Champions

- 1974, 1976, 1977, 1978, 1979, 1980, 1981, 1982

=== WHL Championships ===
- 1984–85: Win, 4–0 vs Kamloops Blazers
- 2018–19: Win, 4–3 vs Vancouver Giants
- 2025–26: Loss, 1–4 vs Everett Silvertips

=== Memorial Cup finals ===
- 1985: Win, 6–1 vs Shawinigan Cataractes

== Season-by-season record ==
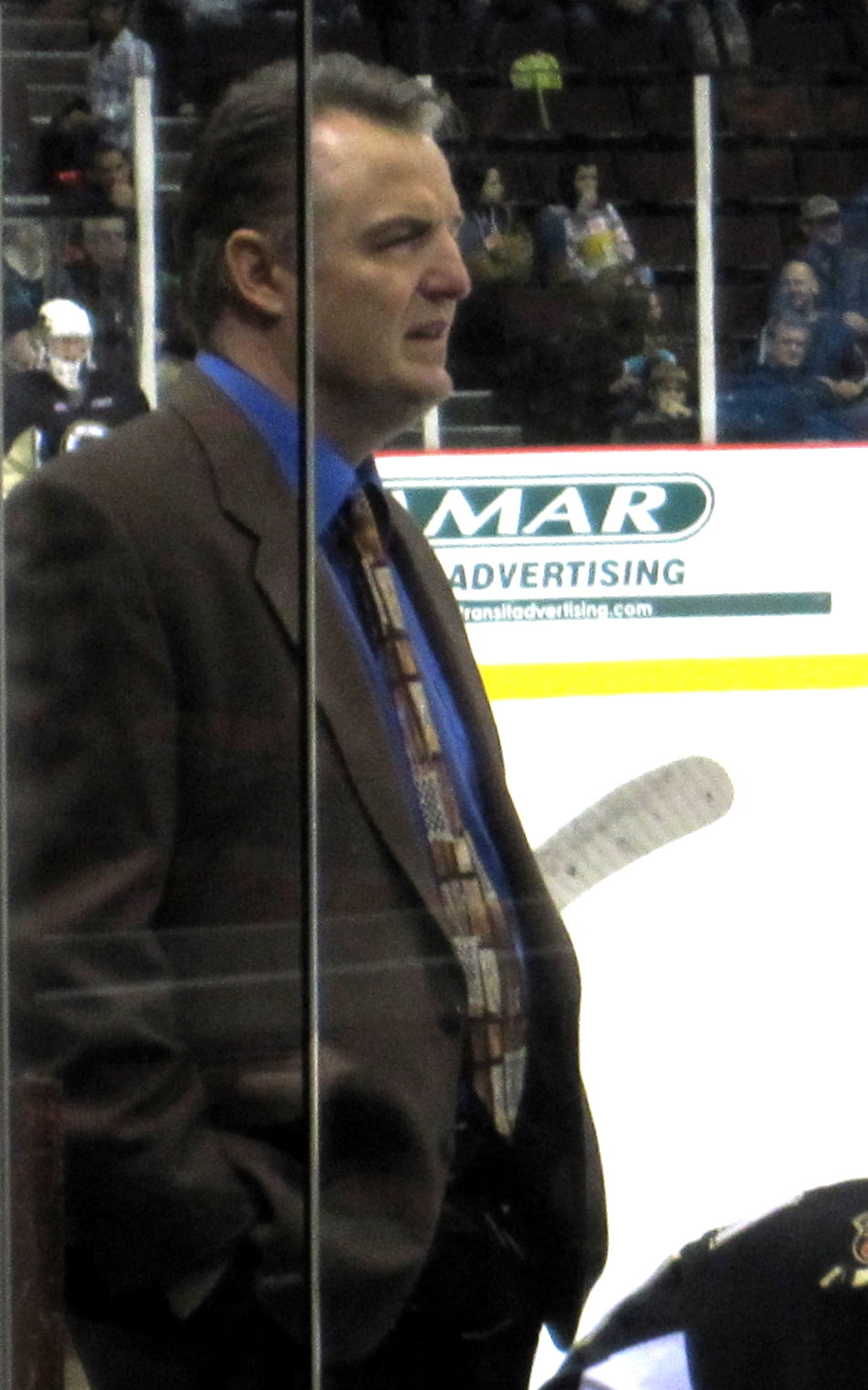
Marc Habscheid coached the Raiders from 2014 to 2022.

Note: GP = Games played, W = Wins, L = Losses, T = Ties OTL = Overtime losses Pts = Points, GF = Goals for, GA = Goals against

Season	GP	W	L	T	OTL	GF	GA	Points	Finish	Playoffs
Saskatchewan Junior Hockey League
1971–72	44	32	12	0	-	277	185	51	3rd SJHL	Lost semifinal
1972–73	48	33	15	0	-	284	202	48	1st SJHL North	Lost semifinal
1973–74	50	35	15	0	-	228	204	70	1st SJHL	Won League
1974–75	58	39	19	0	-	351	210	78	1st SJHL North	Lost final
1975–76	58	47	10	1	-	377	184	95	1st SJHL	Won League, won Anavet Cup
1976–77	60	45	14	1	-	392	242	91	1st SJHL North	Won League, won Anavet Cup, won Centennial Cup
1977–78	59	41	17	1	-	391	220	83	1st SJHL	Won League, won Anavet Cup
1978–79	60	44	13	3	-	405	221	91	1st SJHL	Won League, won Anavet Cup, won Centennial Cup
1979–80	60	45	14	1	-	381	197	91	1st SJHL	Won League, won Anavet Cup
1980–81	60	50	7	3	-	454	199	103	1st SJHL	Won League, won Anavet Cup, won Centennial Cup
1981–82	60	57	3	0	-	-	-	114	1st SJHL	Won League, won Anavet Cup, won Centennial Cup
Western Hockey League
1982–83	72	16	55	1	-	312	455	33	8th East	Did not qualify
1983–84	72	41	29	2	-	411	357	84	5th East	Lost in first round
1984–85	72	58	11	3	-	481	255	116	1st East	Won championship and Memorial Cup
1985–86	72	52	17	3	-	424	257	107	2nd East	Lost East Division final
1986–87	72	43	26	3	-	346	264	89	3rd East	Lost East Division semifinal
1987–88	72	43	24	5	-	373	284	91	3rd East	Lost East Division semifinal
1988–89	72	37	33	2	-	302	286	76	4th East	Lost East Division quarterfinal
1989–90	72	38	33	1	-	302	286	77	2nd East	Lost East Division final
1990–91	72	38	29	5	-	337	284	81	4th East	Lost East Division quarterfinal
1991–92	72	50	20	2	-	356	261	102	1st East	Lost East Division final
1992–93	72	25	42	5	-	252	317	55	9th East	Did not qualify
1993–94	72	31	37	4	-	326	321	66	8th East	Did not qualify
1994–95	72	44	26	2	-	308	267	90	2nd East	Lost East Division final
1995–96	72	47	19	6	-	309	250	100	2nd East	Lost Eastern Conference final
1996–97	72	29	34	9	-	235	262	67	5th East	Lost Eastern Conference quarterfinal
1997–98	72	20	47	5	-	322	288	45	6th East	Did not qualify
1998–99	72	45	22	5	-	288	213	95	1st East	Lost Eastern Conference final
1999–00	72	26	33	6	7	221	257	65	4th East	Lost Eastern Conference quarterfinal
2000–01	72	18	47	3	4	204	348	43	6th East	Did not qualify
2001–02	72	26	41	2	3	234	324	57	5th East	Did not qualify
2002–03	72	27	37	3	5	185	258	62	5th East	Did not qualify
2003–04	72	38	23	6	5	215	186	87	2nd East	Lost Eastern Conference quarterfinal
2004–05	72	31	32	5	4	185	191	71	3rd East	Lost Eastern Conference final
Season	GP	W	L	OTL	SOL	GF	GA	Points	Finish	Playoffs
2005–06	72	25	36	1	10	167	228	61	5th East	Did not qualify
2006–07	72	27	39	3	3	203	266	60	4th East	Lost Eastern Conference quarterfinal
2007–08	72	26	42	3	2	196	248	57	6th East	Did not qualify
2008–09	72	31	36	4	1	233	270	67	4th East	Did not qualify
2009–10	72	32	35	3	2	229	249	69	5th East	Did not qualify
2010–11	72	31	36	2	3	247	283	67	4th East	Lost Eastern Conference quarterfinal
2011–12	72	21	45	3	3	219	312	48	6th East	Did not qualify
2012–13	72	37	28	3	4	234	233	81	2nd East	Lost Eastern Conference quarterfinal
2013–14	72	35	32	3	2	243	258	75	4th East	Lost Eastern Conference quarterfinal
2014–15	72	31	37	2	2	215	257	66	5th East	Did not qualify
2015–16	72	38	26	7	1	222	223	84	2nd East	Lost Eastern Conference quarterfinal
2016–17	72	21	44	5	2	198	283	49	6th East	Did not qualify
2017–18	72	32	27	9	4	245	250	77	5th East	Lost Eastern Conference quarterfinal
2018–19	68	54	10	2	2	307	156	112	1st East	Won championship
2019–20	64	36	18	6	4	210	160	82	1st East	Cancelled due to the COVID-19 pandemic
2020–21	24	9	11	3	1	70	81	22	4th East	No playoff held due to COVID-19 pandemic
2021–22	68	28	35	4	1	194	225	61	5th East	Lost Eastern Conference quarterfinal
2022–23	68	28	37	3	1	198	239	59	6th East	Did not qualify
2023–24	68	31	32	2	3	215	221	67	4th East	Lost Eastern Conference quarterfinal
2024–25	68	39	23	5	1	253	228	84	1st East	Lost Eastern Conference semifinal
2025–26	68	52	10	5	1	310	165	110	1st East	Lost Final

=== Playoffs (SJHL) ===
- 1972 Lost semifinal

Raiders defeated Weyburn Red Wings, 4–2
Melville Millionaires defeated Raiders, 4–2

- 1973 Lost semifinal

Raiders defeated Yorkton Terriers, 4–1
Humboldt Broncos defeated Raiders, 4–0

- 1974 Won League, lost Anavet Cup

Raiders defeated Humboldt Broncos, 4–0
Raiders defeated Saskatoon Olympics, 4–0
Raiders defeated Estevan Bruins, 4–1 (SJHL Champions)
Selkirk Steelers (MJHL) defeated Raiders, 4–2

- 1975 Lost final

Raiders defeated Saskatoon Olympics, 4–1
Raiders defeated Battleford Barons, 4–0
Swift Current Broncos defeated Raiders, 4–2

- 1976 Won League, won Anavet Cup, lost Abbott Cup

Raiders defeated Battleford Barons, 4–0
Raiders defeated Swift Current Broncos, 4–0
Raiders defeated Weyburn Red Wings, 4–0 (SJHL Champions)
Raiders defeated Selkirk Steelers (MJHL), 4–1 (Anavet Cup Champions)
Spruce Grove Mets (AJHL) defeated Raiders, 4–1

- 1977 Won League, won Anavet Cup, won Abbott Cup, won 1977 Centennial Cup

Raiders defeated Humboldt Broncos, 4–0
Raiders defeated Swift Current Broncos, 4–1
Raiders defeated Melville Millionaires, 4–2 (SJHL Champions)
Raiders defeated Dauphin Kings (MJHL), 4–1 (Anavet Cup Champions)
Raiders defeated Calgary Canucks (AJHL), 4–1 (Abbott Cup Champions)
Raiders defeated Pembroke Lumber Kings (CJHL), 4–0 (Centennial Cup Champions)

- 1978 Won League, won Anavet Cup, won Abbott Cup, lost 1978 Centennial Cup

Raiders defeated Battleford Barons, 4–0
Raiders defeated Swift Current Broncos, 4–3
Raiders defeated Moose Jaw Canucks, 4–1 (SJHL Champions)
Raiders defeated Kildonan North Stars (MJHL), 4–0 (Anavet Cup Champions)
Raiders defeated Merritt Centennials (BCJHL), 4–1 (Abbott Cup Champions)
Guelph Platers (OPJHL) defeated Raiders, 4–0

- 1979 Won League, won Anavet Cup, won Abbott Cup, won 1979 Centennial Cup final

Raiders defeated Battleford Barons, 4–1
Raiders defeated Swift Current Broncos, 4–3
Raiders defeated Moose Jaw Canucks, 4–2 (SJHL Champions)
Raiders defeated Selkirk Steelers (MJHL), 4–1 (Anavet Cup Champions)
Raiders defeated Fort Saskatchewan Traders (AJHL), 4–2 Abbott Cup Champions)
First in 1979 Centennial Cup round robin (3-1)
Raiders defeated Sherwood-Parkdale Metros (IJHL), 5-4 (OT) in final (Centennial Cup Champions)

- 1980 Won League, won Anavet Cup, lost Abbott Cup

Raiders defeated Weyburn Red Wings, 4–1
Raiders defeated Swift Current Broncos, 4–2
Raiders defeated Moose Jaw Canucks, 4–2 (SJHL Champions)
Raiders defeated Selkirk Steelers (MJHL), 4–2 (Anavet Cup Champions)
Red Deer Rustlers (AJHL) defeated Raiders, 4–2

- 1981 Won League, won Anavet Cup, won Abbott Cup, won 1981 Centennial Cup final

Raiders defeated Battleford Barons, 4–0
Raiders defeated Humboldt Broncos, 4–0
Raiders defeated Moose Jaw Canucks, 4–3 (SAJHL Champions)
Raiders defeated St. Boniface Saints (MJHL), 4–1 (Anavet Cup Champions)
Raiders defeated St. Albert Saints (AJHL), 4–0 (Abbott Cup Champions)
First in 1981 Centennial Cup round robin (3-1)
Raiders defeated Belleville Bulls (OPJHL), 6-2 in final (Centennial Cup Champions)

- 1982 Won League, won Anavet Cup, won Abbott Cup, won 1982 Centennial Cup

Raiders defeated Humboldt Broncos, 4–0
Raiders defeated Swift Current Broncos, 4–0
Raiders defeated Yorkton Terriers, 4–0 (SAJHL Champions)
Raiders defeated Fort Garry Blues (MJHL), 4–2 (Anavet Cup Champions)
Raiders defeated St. Albert Saints (AJHL), 4–1 (Abbott Cup Champions)
Raiders defeated Guelph Platers (OJHL), 4–0 (Centennial Cup Champions)

== Players ==
=== NHL alumni ===
The following list includes alumni from the Prince Albert Raiders of the Saskatchewan Junior Hockey League (SJHL) and the Western Hockey League (WHL) who went on to play in the National Hockey League.

==== SJHL Raiders ====
- Robin Bartel
- Todd Bergen
- Rollie Boutin
- Ron Delorme
- Gary Emmons
- Bob Hoffmeyer
- Brad McCrimmon
- Dave Michayluk
- Bill Oleschuk
- Greg Paslawski
- James Patrick
- Darcy Regier
- Dave Reierson
- Dave Tippett
- Bill Watson

==== WHL Raiders ====
- Nolan Allan
- Ryan Bast
- Ken Baumgartner
- Todd Bergen
- Curtis Brown
- Shawn Byram
- Frederic Chabot
- Kyle Chipchura
- Brad Church
- Byron Dafoe
- Rod Dallman
- Leon Draisaitl
- Pat Elynuik
- Todd Fedoruk
- Joaquin Gage
- Noah Gregor
- Dave Goertz
- Steve Gotaas
- Kaiden Guhle
- Scott Hartnell
- Paul Healey
- Jim Hiller
- Shane Hnidy
- Dan Hodgson
- Kim Issel
- Parker Kelly
- Steve Kelly
- Dan Kesa
- Darin Kimble
- Dean Kolstad
- Milan Kraft
- Gord Kruppke
- Dale Kushner
- Jeff Lank
- Brett Leason
- Jamie Linden
- Ross Lupaschuk
- Steve MacIntyre
- Dave Manson
- Dean McAmmond
- Grant McNeill
- Mike Modano
- Josh Morrissey
- Jeff Nelson
- Todd Nelson
- Brayden Pachal
- Dave Pasin
- Denis Pederson
- Chris Phillips
- Richard Pilon
- Aliaksei Protas
- Nick Schultz
- Cam Severson
- Reid Simpson
- Michal Sivek
- Alan Stewart
- Ryan Stewart
- Kevin Todd
- Shayne Toporowski
- David Van Drunen
- Darren Van Impe
- Emanuel Viveiros
- Roman Vopat
- Wes Walz
- Shane Willis

=== Retired numbers ===
Numbers retired by the Raiders:

#	Player
4	Dave Manson
9	Mike Modano
16	Dan Hodgson

== Team records ==
Team records for a single season
Statistic	Total	Season
Most points	119	1984–85
Most wins	58	1984–85
Most road wins	27	1984–85
Most home wins	31	1984–85
Most goals for	481	1984–85
Fewest goals for	167	2005–06
Fewest goals against	156	2018–19
Most goals against	444	1982–83

Individual player records for a single season
Statistic	Player	Total	Season
Most goals	Dan Hodgson	70	1984–85
Most assists	Dan Hodgson	119	1983–84
Most points	Dan Hodgson	182	1984–85
Most points, defenceman	Manny Viveiros	109	1983–84
Penalty minutes	Darin Kimble	307	1987–88
Best GAA (goalie)	Ian Scott	1.83	2018–19
Goalies = minimum 1500 minutes played

Career records
Statistic	Player	Total	Career
Most goals	Dan Hodgson	188	1982–1985
Most assists	Dan Hodgson	305	1982–1985
Most points	Dan Hodgson	493	1982–1985
Most points, defenceman	Manny Viveiros	321	1982–1986
Most games played	Sean Montgomery	345	2014–2019
Most games played (goalie)	Evan Lindsay	206	1996–2000
Most shutouts (goalie)	Rejean Beauchemin	12	2002–2005

== Awards ==
Four Broncos Memorial Trophy (WHL player of the year)

- Manny Viveiros: 1985–86 (East Division winner)

Jim Piggott Memorial Trophy (WHL rookie of the year)

- Dan Hodgson: 1982–83
- Donevan Hextall: 1990–91
- Chris Phillips: 1995–96
- Ryder Ritchie: 2022–23

Bill Hunter Memorial Trophy (WHL top defenceman)

- Manny Viveiros: 1985–86 (East Division winner)

Del Wilson Trophy (WHL top goaltender)

- Kenton Rein: 1986–87 (East Division winner)
- Ian Scott: 2018–19

Dunc McCallum Memorial Trophy (WHL coach of the year)

- Terry Simpson (2): 1983–84, 1985–86
- Marc Habscheid: 2018–19

Doc Seaman Trophy (WHL scholastic player of the year)

- Ken Baumgartner: 1983–84
- Jeff Nelson (2): 1988–89, 1989–90
- Josh Morrissey: 2012–13
- Nick McBride: 2014–15

WHL Playoff MVP (Awarded since 1992)

- Ian Scott: 2018–19

Stafford Smythe Memorial Trophy (Memorial Cup MVP)

- Dan Hodgson: 1985 Memorial Cup

Hap Emms Memorial Trophy (Memorial Cup top goaltender)

- Ward Komonosky: 1985 Memorial Cup

George Parsons Trophy (Memorial Cup sportsmanship)

- Tony Grenier: 1985 Memorial Cup

== See also ==
- Ice hockey in Saskatchewan
- List of ice hockey teams in Saskatchewan

Preceded by Rockland Nationals	Centennial Cup Champions; 1977	Succeeded by Guelph Platers
Preceded by Guelph Platers	Centennial Cup Champions; 1979	Succeeded by Red Deer Rustlers
Preceded by Red Deer Rustlers	Centennial Cup Champions; 1981 and 1982	Succeeded by North York Rangers
