= Greg Walters =

Canadian ice hockey player and coach

- Born: August 12, 1970 (age 55) Calgary, Alberta, Canada
- Height: 6 ft 1 in (185 cm)
- Weight: 200 lb (91 kg; 14 st 4 lb)
- Position: Left wing
- Shot: Left
- Played for: Newmarket Saints; St. John's Maple Leafs; Rochester Americans; Fort Wayne Komets; Chicago Wolves; Houston Aeros
- NHL draft: 80th overall, 1990; Toronto Maple Leafs
- Playing career: 1990–2002

Greg Walters (born August 12, 1970) is a Canadian former professional ice hockey player and coach. He was drafted into the National Hockey League in 1990, but spent his career playing in the minor leagues. During 12 seasons, he played 248 games in the American Hockey League, and 241 games in the International Hockey League. Turning to coaching, he won two Ontario Junior Hockey League Coach of the Year awards, and one Canadian Junior Hockey League Coach of the Year award. He was later a head coach in the Ontario Hockey League for the Oshawa Generals and the Owen Sound Attack.

== Playing career ==
Walters played three seasons of junior ice hockey for the Ottawa 67's, after being drafted 65th overall in the 1987 OHL priority draft. In his third season in Ottawa, Walters scored 36 goals, and 90 points, playing for coach Brian Kilrea. Walters was drafted in the 4th round, 80th overall, of the 1990 NHL entry draft by the Toronto Maple Leafs. Walters did not reach the National Hockey League, and spent 12 seasons in the minor leagues. He played 248 games in the American Hockey League for the Newmarket Saints, St. John's Maple Leafs, and the Rochester Americans; and 241 games in the International Hockey League for the Fort Wayne Komets, Chicago Wolves, and the Houston Aeros. Walters played for the Brantford Smoke, and won the Colonial Cup in the 1992–93 season. In the 1993–94 season for Brantford, Walters had his best offensive season, scoring 42 goals, and 104 points. Walters was considered a defensive winger, and played for future NHL coaches Bruce Boudreau, Marc Crawford, Ron Low and John Tortorella.

== Coaching career ==
Walters began his coaching career as a player-coach during his final season play, with the Port Huron Border Cats in the 2001–02 UHL season. He spent eight seasons from 2002–03 OHL season to the 2009–10 OHL season, as an assistant coach for the Sarnia Sting. During this time he worked with head coaches Jeff Perry, Shawn Camp, and Dave MacQueen. Walters chose to leave the Sting to return to the Toronto area, and look for a new challenge.

=== Georgetown Raiders ===
Walters was the head coach and general manager of the Georgetown Raiders in the Ontario Junior Hockey League for eight seasons, from the 2010–11 season to the 2017–18 season. In his second season with Georgetown, the Raiders won their division and conference titles, and Walters was named the 2011–12 OJHL Coach of the Year. During his third season with the Raiders, Walters was selected by Hockey Canada in cooperation with the Canadian Junior Hockey League, to be the head coach of Canada East for the 2012 World Junior A Challenge, along with assistant coaches Sheldon Keefe and Jason Nobili. His team finished in fourth place in 2012, but in the 2011 World Junior A Challenge as an assistant coach, his team won the silver medal. In the 2016–17 season, Walters led Georgetown to its best season in team history to date, with a record of 45–5–2–2, finishing first overall in the OJHL with 94 points. Walters was named the 2016-17 OJHL Coach of the Year, and the 2016-17 CJHL Coach of the Year. He was also named OJHL Executive of the Year in his role as the team's general manager. During his eight-season tenure with the Raiders, he led the team to a 295–96–16–16 regular season record. While in Georgetown, Walters coached future NHL players Evan Rodrigues, and Scott Wilson.

=== Oshawa Generals ===
Walters was named head coach of the Oshawa Generals on June 11, 2018, and assistant coaches Greg Nemisz and Nathan McIver remained with the team. Walters said that his coaching style will be defence-first team, including blocking shots, and a quick counter attack. After two seasons coached, he left the Generals following the cancelled 2020–21 season.

=== Owen Sound Attack ===
Walters was named head coach of the Owen Sound Attack on June 30, 2021. He served parts of three seasons as head coach, and was dismissed on October 16, 2023.

== Personal life ==
Walters was born in Calgary, Alberta, and grew up in the Leaside area of Toronto, Ontario. He resides in the Greater Toronto Area, and has two sons who play youth baseball.

== Playing statistics ==
Career regular season and playoffs statistics.

			Regular Season					Playoffs
Season	Team	League	GP	G	A	Pts	PIM	GP	G	A	Pts	PIM
1987–88	Ottawa 67's	OHL	63	11	25	36	52	16	4	2	6	10
1988–89	Ottawa 67's	OHL	28	17	21	38	20	12	3	4	7	20
1989–90	Ottawa 67's	OHL	63	36	54	90	57	4	1	2	3	12
1990–91	Newmarket Saints	AHL	54	7	14	21	58	–	–	–	–	–
1991–92	Raleigh IceCaps	ECHL	18	9	13	22	30	4	1	2	3	8
1991–92	St. John's Maple Leafs	AHL	10	0	2	2	20	–	–	–	–	–
1992–93	Brantford Smoke	CoHL	26	14	19	33	44	10	11	8	19	20
1992–93	St. John's Maple Leafs	AHL	27	4	5	9	82	1	0	1	1	4
1993–94	St. John's Maple Leafs	AHL	13	0	2	2	67	–	–	–	–	–
1993–94	Brantford Smoke	CoHL	42	42	62	104	8	7	5	3	8	8
1994–95	Fort Wayne Komets	IHL	44	4	9	13	142	–	–	–	–	–
1994–95	Chicago Wolves	IHL	18	1	4	5	110	2	0	0	0	0
1995–96	Chicago Wolves	IHL	50	4	7	11	254	5	0	0	0	12
1996–97	Rochester Americans	AHL	55	5	10	15	247	10	3	6	9	20
1997–98	Rochester Americans	AHL	33	4	3	7	81	–	–	–	–	–
1998–99	Rochester Americans	AHL	56	6	8	14	200	15	1	3	4	14
1999–2000	Houston Aeros	IHL	63	4	7	11	192	5	0	1	1	4
2000–01	Houston Aeros	IHL	66	4	9	13	186	3	0	0	0	5
2001–02	Port Huron Border Cats	UHL	18	5	8	13	44	–	–	–	–	–
OHL totals			154	64	100	164	129	32	8	8	16	42
AHL totals			248	26	44	70	755	26	4	10	14	38
IHL totals			241	17	36	53	864	15	0	1	1	21
CoHL/UHL totals			86	61	89	150	96	17	16	11	27	28

== Coaching record ==
Note: GP = games played, W = wins, L = losses, T = ties, OTL = overtime losses, GF = goals for, GA = goals against, Ref = reference (source)

=== Ontario Junior Hockey League ===
Season	Team	League	GP	W	L	T	OTL	GF	GA	Points	Standing	Playoffs	Ref
2010–11	Georgetown Raiders	OJHL	50	32	15	–	3	244	169	67	3rd, west	Lost, 1–4 (Blades)	
2011–12	Georgetown Raiders	OJHL	49	39	9	–	1	224	109	79	1st, west 1st, northwest	Won, 4–1 (Cougars); Won, 4–2 (Blades); Lost, 3–4 (Spirit)	
2012–13	Georgetown Raiders	OJHL	55	38	13	–	4	224	140	80	2nd, west	Won, 4–2 (Patriots); Lost, 1–4 (Buzzers)	
2013–14	Georgetown Raiders	OJHL	53	31	20	–	2	196	160	64	2nd, west	Won, 4–0 (Icehawks); Won, 4–1 (Jr. Sabres); Lost, 0–4 (Patriots)	
2014–15	Georgetown Raiders	OJHL	54	37	9	3	5	204	126	82	1st, west 1st, southwest	Won, 4–0 (Icehawks); Won, 4–1 (Jr. Sabres); Lost, 0–4 (Patriots)	
2015–16	Georgetown Raiders	OJHL	54	37	13	3	1	210	129	78	1st, west 1st, southwest	Won, 4–1 (Flyers); Won, 4–2 (Rangers); Won, 4–2 (Cougars); Lost finals, 1–4 (Golden Hawks)	
2016–17	Georgetown Raiders	OJHL	54	45	5	2	2	258	183	94	1st, west 1st, southwest 1st, OJHL	Won, 4–1 (Cougars); Won, 4–0 (Jr. Canadiens); Won, 4–2 (Blades); Won finals, 4–3 (Golden Hawks); OJHL Champions	
2017–18	Georgetown Raiders	OJHL	54	36	12	3	3	200	110	78	1st, west	Won, 4–0 (Buzzers); Won, 4–3 (Rangers); Won, 4–3 (Patriots); Lost finals, 2–4 (Dukes)	
OJHL totals			423	295	96	11	21	1760	1126	622	5 division titles 4 conference titles 1 league title	3 finals appearances 1 championship	

=== Ontario Hockey League ===
Team	Year	League	Regular season							Postseason
Team	Year	League	G	W	L	T	OTL	Pts	Finish	Result
Oshawa	2018–19	OHL	68	44	20	4	0	92	2nd in East	Lost in eastern conference finals (Ottawa)
Oshawa	2019–20	OHL	62	31	20	6	5	73	3rd in East	Season cancelled due to COVID-19 pandemic
Owen Sound	2021–22	OHL	68	34	26	5	3	76	3rd in Midwest	Lost in conference quarterfinals (Flint)
Owen Sound	2022–23	OHL	68	33	28	6	1	73	3rd in Midwest	Lost in conference quarterfinals (London)
Owen Sound	2023–24	OHL	7	4	2	1	0	9	3rd in Midwest	Fired on October 16, 2023
Oshawa totals			130	75	40	10	5	165		
Owen Sound totals			143	71	56	12	4	158		
OHL totals			273	146	96	22	9	323		
