= 2012–13 OJHL season =

- League: Ontario Junior Hockey League
- Sport: Hockey
- Duration: Regular season 2012-09-07 – 2013-02-24; Playoffs; 2013-02-25 – 2013-04-21
- Teams: 22
- Finals champions: St. Michael's Buzzers

OJHL seasons
- 2011–12 OJHL 2013–14 OJHL

The 2012–13 OJHL season is the 19th season of the Ontario Junior Hockey League (OJHL) and the third since the league existed as two separate bodies in 2009–10. The twenty-two teams of the North, South, East and West Divisions will play 55-game schedules.

Come February, the top teams of each division will play down for the Frank L. Buckland Trophy, the OJHL championship. The winner of the Buckland Cup will compete in the Central Canadian Junior "A" championship, the Dudley Hewitt Cup. If successful against the winners of the Northern Ontario Junior Hockey League and Superior International Junior Hockey League, the champion would then move on to play in the Canadian Junior Hockey League championship, the 2013 Royal Bank Cup.

== Changes ==
- Conferences have changed to "Northeast" and "Southwest" to better fit retraction.
- Huntsville Otters have ceased operations, jumped down to Georgian Mid-Ontario Junior C Hockey League.
- Brampton Capitals have ceased operations.
- Vaughan Vipers have ceased operations.
- Peterborough Stars have ceased operations and merge with Lindsay Muskies.
- Markham Waxers suspend operations for 2012–13 season.

== Final standings ==
Note: GP = Games played; W = Wins; L = Losses; OTL = Overtime losses; SOL = Shootout losses; GF = Goals for; GA = Goals against; PTS = Points; x = clinched playoff berth; y = clinched division title; z = clinched conference title; w = eliminated.

Shaded Green denotes divisional and conference leader, red is the other divisional leader, blue are teams in line for playoff seeds 3 through 8 of their conference.

North-East Conference
North Division
Team	Centre	W–L–OTL–SOL	Points
y-Aurora Tigers	Aurora, Ontario	32-17-1-5	70
x-Newmarket Hurricanes	Newmarket, Ontario	29-19-3-4	65
x-Lindsay Muskies	Lindsay, Ontario	25-25-1-4	55
w-Stouffville Spirit	Stouffville, Ontario	18-31-5-1	42
w-Pickering Panthers	Pickering, Ontario	13-37-2-3	31
East Division
Team	Centre	W–L–OTL–SOL	Points
zy-Trenton Golden Hawks	Trenton, Ontario	40-10-1-4	85
x-Kingston Voyageurs	Kingston, Ontario	34-15-1-5	74
x-Whitby Fury	Whitby, Ontario	31-19-1-4	67
x-Wellington Dukes	Wellington, Ontario	29-22-2-2	62
x-Cobourg Cougars	Cobourg, Ontario	24-25-2-4	54
South-West Conference
South Division
Team	Centre	W–L–OTL–SOL	Points
y-St. Michael's Buzzers	Toronto, Ontario	37-15-3-0	77
x-North York Rangers	Toronto, Ontario	33-14-4-4	74
x-Oakville Blades	Oakville, Ontario	34-16-1-4	73
x-Toronto Lakeshore Patriots	Toronto, Ontario	34-16-1-4	73
x-Toronto Jr. Canadiens	Toronto, Ontario	27-23-2-3	59
w-Mississauga Chargers	Mississauga, Ontario	22-29-1-3	48
West Division
Team	Centre	W–L–OTL–SOL	Points
zy-Buffalo Jr. Sabres	Amherst, New York	38-12-1-4	81
x-Georgetown Raiders	Georgetown, Ontario	38-13-1-3	80
x-Burlington Cougars	Burlington, Ontario	25-27-1-2	53
w-Milton Icehawks	Milton, Ontario	19-27-4-5	47
w-Orangeville Flyers	Orangeville, Ontario	18-34-0-3	39
w-Hamilton Red Wings	Hamilton, Ontario	5-49-0-1	11

Teams listed on the official league website.

Standings listed by Pointstreak on official league website.

== 2012-13 Frank L. Buckland Trophy Playoffs ==
Conference Quarter-final	Conference Semi-final
NE1	Trenton	0
NE8	Cobourg	4
NE8	Cobourg	1
NE3	Kingston	4
NE3	Kingston	4
NE6	Wellington	1
North-East
NE2	Aurora	2
NE7	Lindsay	4
NE7	Lindsay	0
NE5	Newmarket	4
NE4	Whitby	2
NE5	Newmarket	4
SW1	Buffalo	4
SW8	Burlington	0
SW1	Buffalo	2
SW4	North York	4
SW4	North York	4
SW5	Oakville	2
South-West
SW2	St. Michael's	4
SW7	Toronto	2
SW2	St. Michael's	4
SW3	Georgetown	1
SW3	Georgetown	4
SW6	Lakeshore	2

Conference Final
NE3	Kingston	3
NE5	Newmarket	4
SW4	North York	2
SW2	St. Michael's	4

Buckland Cup
NE5	Newmarket	3
SW2	St. Michael's	4

Playoff results are listed by Pointstreak on the official league website.

== Dudley Hewitt Cup Championship ==
Hosted by the North Bay Trappers in North Bay, Ontario. The St. Michael's Buzzers lost the final.

Round Robin

St. Michael's Buzzers 4 - Soo Thunderbirds (NOJHL) 2
St. Michael's Buzzers 5 - North Bay Trappers (NOJHL) 2
Minnesota Wilderness (SIJHL) 3 - St. Michael's Buzzers 0

Semi-final

St. Michael's Buzzers 5 - Soo Thunderbirds (NOJHL) 1

Final

Minnesota Wilderness (SIJHL) 4 - St. Michael's Buzzers 3 OT

== Scoring leaders ==
Note: GP = Games played; G = Goals; A = Assists; Pts = Points; PIM = Penalty minutes

Player	Team	GP	G	A	Pts	PIM
Tyler Gjurich	Buffalo Jr. Sabres	53	53	44	97	34
Jonah Renouf	Oakville Blades	53	29	65	94	18
Shane Bennett	Milton Icehawks	54	45	42	87	72
John Carpino	North York Rangers	54	42	41	83	78
Alex Botten	Georgetown Raiders	49	22	58	80	60
Nathan Renouf	Oakville Blades	54	21	56	77	28
Corey Kalk	North York Rangers	52	31	45	76	80
Matt Buckles	St. Michael's Buzzers	50	40	31	71	107
Daniel Leavens	Newmarket Hurricanes	53	25	44	69	76
Jacob Bauchman	Georgetown Raiders	49	34	34	68	66

== Leading goaltenders ==
Note: GP = Games played; Mins = Minutes played; W = Wins; L = Losses: OTL = Overtime losses; SL = Shootout losses; GA = Goals Allowed; SO = Shutouts; GAA = Goals against average

Player	Team	GP	Mins	W	L	OTL	SOL	GA	SO	Sv%	GAA
Charlie Finn	Kingston Voyageurs	39	2374:04	25	10	0	4	85	8	0.941	2.15
Matt Larose	Wellington Dukes	36	2134:17	20	13	1	2	90	2	0.933	2.53
Adrian Ignagni	St. Michael's Buzzers	44	2507:14	30	12	1	0	106	4	0.927	2.54
Joseph Planta	Toronto Lakeshore Patriots	37	2068:11	22	7	0	4	75	4	0.926	2.18
Parker Gahagen	Buffalo Jr. Sabres	43	2591:59	29	10	1	3	110	7	0.924	2.55

== Award winners ==
- Top Scorer - Tyler Gjurich (Buffalo)
- Best Defenceman - Patrick McCarron (St. Michael's)
- Most Gentlemanly Player - Dean Klomp (Lindsay)
- Most Improved Player - John Carpino (North York)
- Most Valuable Player - Tyler Gjurich (Buffalo)
- Rookie of the Year - Tyler Gjurich (Buffalo)
- Coach of the Year - Michael Peca (Buffalo)
- Best Goaltender - Charlie Finn (Kingston)
- Humanitarian - Tyler Feaver (Whitby)
- Scholastic - Jordin Dunin (Newmarket)
- Top Prospect - Matt Buckles (St. Michael's)
- Playoff MVP - Shane Conacher (St. Michael's)
- Top Executive - Michael Peca (Buffalo)
- Top Trainer - Jack Williams (Buffalo)
- Volunteer of the Year - Mike Johnson (Orangeville)

== Central Canada Cup Challenge ==

The second annual Central Canada Cup Challenge is an interleague all-star tournament hosted by Wellington, Ontario. The event runs December 27–29, 2012. The name of the event has been slightly altered from the 2011 event, probably in response to the creation of the Western Canada Cup by their rival Western leagues.

See: Central Canada Cup Challenge

== Players selected in 2013 NHL entry draft ==
- Rd 4 #98 Matt Buckles - Florida Panthers (St. Michael's Buzzers)
- Rd 7 #209 Troy Josephs - Pittsburgh Penguins (St. Michael's Buzzers)

== See also ==
- 2013 Royal Bank Cup
- Dudley Hewitt Cup
- List of OJHL seasons
- Northern Ontario Junior Hockey League
- Superior International Junior Hockey League
- Greater Ontario Junior Hockey League
- 2012 in ice hockey
- 2013 in ice hockey

Preceded by 2011–12 OJHL season	OJHL seasons	Succeeded by 2013–14 OJHL season
