= 2011–12 OJHL season =

- League: Ontario Junior Hockey League
- Sport: Hockey
- Duration: Regular season 2011-09-09 – 2012-02-12; Playoffs; 2012-02-13 – 2012-04-13
- Teams: 27
- Finals champions: Stouffville Spirit

OJHL seasons
- 2010–11 OJHL 2012–13 OJHL

The 2011–12 OJHL season is the 18th season of the Ontario Junior Hockey League (OJHL) and the second since the league existed as two separate bodies in 2009–10. The twenty-seven teams of the North, South, East and West Divisions will play 49-game schedules.

Come February, the top teams of each division will play down for the Frank L. Buckland Trophy, the OJHL championship. The winner of the Buckland Cup will compete in the Central Canadian Junior "A" championship, the Dudley Hewitt Cup. If successful against the winners of the Northern Ontario Junior Hockey League and Superior International Junior Hockey League, the champion would then move on to play in the Canadian Junior Hockey League championship, the 2012 Royal Bank Cup.

== Changes ==
- Streetsville Derbys are gone, they merged into the Cobourg Cougars.
- Collingwood Blackhawks have ceased operations.
- Orangeville Flyers have ceased operations.
- Dixie Beehives have ceased operations.
- Villanova Knights move and are renamed Orangeville Flyers.
- Upper Canada Patriots are renamed Toronto Lakeshore Patriots.

== Current Standings ==
Note: GP = Games played; W = Wins; L = Losses; OTL = Overtime losses; SL = Shootout losses; GF = Goals for; GA = Goals against; PTS = Points; x = clinched playoff berth; y = clinched division title; z = clinched conference title

North-West Conference
North Division
Team	Centre	W–L–OTL–SOL	GF–GA	Points
Newmarket Hurricanes	Newmarket, Ontario	37-7-1-4	212-116	79
Stouffville Spirit	Stouffville, Ontario	32-8-5-4	217-152	73
Aurora Tigers	Aurora, Ontario	28-13-2-6	188-163	64
Markham Waxers	Markham, Ontario	30-17-1-1	216-185	62
Huntsville Otters	Huntsville, Ontario	18-26-0-5	175-205	41
Orangeville Flyers	Orangeville, Ontario	19-29-1-0	155-206	39
West Division
Team	Centre	W–L–OTL–SOL	GF–GA	Points
Georgetown Raiders	Georgetown, Ontario	39-9-1-0	224-109	79
Oakville Blades	Oakville, Ontario	31-12-2-4	196-120	68
Buffalo Jr. Sabres	Buffalo, New York	23-21-4-1	189-189	51
Burlington Cougars	Burlington, Ontario	20-29-0-0	161-205	40
Milton Icehawks	Milton, Ontario	18-28-1-2	195-264	39
Hamilton Red Wings	Hamilton, Ontario	17-27-2-3	176-241	39
Brampton Capitals	Brampton, Ontario	6-42-1-0	118-276	13
South-East Conference
East Division
Team	Centre	W–L–OTL–SOL	GF–GA	Points
Trenton Golden Hawks	Trenton, Ontario	36-7-2-4	215-128	78
Cobourg Cougars	Cobourg, Ontario	37-9-1-2	232-158	77
Wellington Dukes	Wellington, Ontario	33-12-1-3	208-124	70
Whitby Fury	Whitby, Ontario	28-12-5-4	178-132	65
Lindsay Muskies	Lindsay, Ontario	25-23-1-0	172-174	51
Kingston Voyageurs	Kingston, Ontario	23-24-1-1	172-166	48
Peterborough Stars	Peterborough, Ontario	8-37-2-2	105-227	20
South Division
Team	Centre	W–L–OTL–SOL	GF–GA	Points
St. Michael's Buzzers	Toronto, Ontario	37-8-1-3	215-135	78
Vaughan Vipers	Vaughan, Ontario	29-18-1-1	196-153	60
Toronto Lakeshore Patriots	Toronto, Ontario	27-17-3-2	199-169	59
North York Rangers	Toronto, Ontario	20-24-3-2	167-184	45
Toronto Jr. Canadiens	Toronto, Ontario	18-24-5-2	156-184	43
Pickering Panthers	Pickering, Ontario	11-37-0-1	141-280	23
Mississauga Chargers	Mississauga, Ontario	11-38-0-0	140-282	22

Teams listed on the official league website.

Standings listed by Pointstreak on official league website.

== 2011-12 Frank L. Buckland Trophy Playoffs ==
Division QF
N4	Markham	3
N5	Huntsville	0
N3	Aurora	3
N6	Orangeville	1
W4	Burlington	3
W5	Milton	1
W3	Buffalo	3
W6	Hamilton	0
E3	Wellington	2
E6	Kingston	3
E4	Whitby	3
E5	Lindsay	0
S4	North York	1
S5	Toronto	3
S3	Lakeshore	3
S6	Pickering	1

Division SF
N1	Newmarket	4
N4	Markham	2
N2	Stouffville	4
N3	Aurora	1
W1	Georgetown	4
W4	Burlington	1
W2	Oakville	4
W3	Buffalo	1
E1	Trenton	2
E6	Kingston	4
E2	Cobourg	1
E4	Whitby	4
S1	St. Michael's	4
S5	Toronto	2
S2	Vaughan	3
S3	Lakeshore	4

Division Finals
N1	Newmarket	3
N2	Stouffville	4
W1	Georgetown	4
W2	Oakville	2
E6	Kingston	0
E4	Whitby	4
S1	St. Michael's	1
S3	Lakeshore	4

Conference Finals
N2	Stouffville	4
W1	Georgetown	3
E4	Whitby	4
S3	Lakeshore	1

Buckland Cup Final
N2	Stouffville	4
E4	Whitby	2

Playoff results are listed by Pointstreak on the official league website.

== Dudley Hewitt Cup Championship ==
Hosted by the Thunder Bay North Stars in Thunder Bay, Ontario. The Stouffville Spirit finished first in the round robin, but lost the final and finished second.

Round Robin

Stouffville Spirit 2 - Thunder Bay North Stars (SIJHL) 1 in overtime
Wisconsin Wilderness (SIJHL) 5 - Stouffville Spirit 2
Stouffville Spirit 10 - Soo Thunderbirds (NOJHL) 2

Final

Soo Thunderbirds (NOJHL) 5 - Stouffville Spirit 3

== Scoring leaders ==
Note: GP = Games played; G = Goals; A = Assists; Pts = Points; PIM = Penalty minutes

Player	Team	GP	G	A	Pts	PIM
Christian Finch	Stouffville Spirit	48	37	67	104	23
Darcy Murphy	Wellington Dukes	48	52	34	86	37
Chris Porter	Stouffville Spirit	49	39	41	80	30
Andrew Radjenovic	Markham Waxers	45	35	40	75	49
Stephen Genua	Georgetown Raiders	49	20	54	74	175
Matt Carey	Toronto Jr. Canadiens	48	33	36	69	32
Dylan Goddard	Cobourg Cougars	49	34	34	68	4
Morgan Bonner	Newmarket Hurricanes	46	36	28	64	16
Bowman Webster	Newmarket Hurricanes	48	19	45	64	29
Nick Perruccio	Georgetown Raiders	46	32	31	63	91

== Leading goaltenders ==
Note: GP = Games played; Mins = Minutes played; W = Wins; L = Losses: OTL = Overtime losses; SL = Shootout losses; GA = Goals Allowed; SO = Shutouts; GAA = Goals against average

Player	Team	GP	Mins	W	L	OTL	SOL	GA	SO	Sv%	GAA
James Prigione	Oakville Blades	28	1614:49	17	7	1	1	55	6	.932	2.04
Kevin Entmaa	Aurora Tigers	19	1025:29	12	3	0	1	39	1	.930	2.28
Tyler Marble	Wellington Dukes	20	1131:49	14	4	0	1	44	3	.929	2.33
Emerson Verrier	Cobourg Cougars	24	1316:34	18	1	0	1	56	2	.928	2.55
Charlie Finn	Kingston Voyageurs	19	1104:23	7	11	0	0	52	1	.928	2.83

== Award winners ==
- Top Scorer: Christian Finch (Stouffville Spirit)
- Top Defenceman: Paul Geiger (Stouffville Spirit)
- Most Gentlemanly Player: Dylan Goddard (Cobourg Cougars)
- Most Valuable Player: Christian Finch (Stouffville Spirit)
- Rookie of the Year: Devin Shore (Whitby Fury)
- Scholastic Player of the Year: Adam Shibuya (Toronto Jr. Canadiens)
- Playoff MVP: Drake Caggiula (Stouffville Spirit)
- Top Prospect: Devin Shore (Whitby Fury)
- Coach of the Year: Gregory Walters (Georgetown Raiders)
- Coach Canada Most Improved Player: Darcy Murphy (Wellington Dukes)
- Fan Favourite: Andrew Doyle (Stouffville Spirit)
- Top Goaltender: James Prigione (Oakville Blades)
- Executive of the Year: Ken Burrows (Stouffville Spirit)
- Volunteer of the Year: Karen Sheppard (Pickering Panthers and Whitby Fury)
- Trainer of the Year: Andrew Groombridge (Georgetown Raiders)
- Humanitarian of the Year: Matthew Dineen (Newmarket Hurricanes)

== Players selected in 2012 NHL entry draft ==
- Rd 2 #61 Devin Shore - Dallas Stars (Whitby Fury)
- Rd 6 #170 James de Haas - Detroit Red Wings (Toronto Lakeshore Patriots)
- Rd 7 #190 Jamie Phillips - Winnipeg Jets (Toronto Jr. Canadiens)

== See also ==
- 2012 Royal Bank Cup
- Dudley Hewitt Cup
- List of OJHL seasons
- Northern Ontario Junior Hockey League
- Superior International Junior Hockey League
- Greater Ontario Junior Hockey League
- 2011 in ice hockey
- 2012 in ice hockey

Preceded by 2010–11 OJHL season	OJHL seasons	Succeeded by 2012–13 OJHL season
