= 2013–14 OJHL season =

- League: Ontario Junior Hockey League
- Sport: Hockey
- Duration: Regular season 2013-09-06 – 2014-02-23; Playoffs; 2014-02-26 – 2014-04-20
- Teams: 22
- Finals champions: Toronto Lakeshore Patriots

OJHL seasons
- 2012–13 OJHL 2014–15 OJHL

The 2013–14 OJHL season is the 20th season of the Ontario Junior Hockey League (OJHL) and the fourth since the league existed as two separate bodies in 2009–10. The twenty-two teams of the North, South, East and West Divisions will play 55-game schedules.

Come February, the top teams of each division will play down for the Frank L. Buckland Trophy, the OJHL championship. The winner of the Buckland Cup will compete in the Central Canadian Junior "A" championship, the Dudley Hewitt Cup. If successful against the winners of the Northern Ontario Junior Hockey League and Superior International Junior Hockey League, the champion would then move on to play in the Canadian Junior Hockey League championship, the 2014 Royal Bank Cup.

== Changes ==
- Markham Waxers no longer have a franchise.

== Current standings ==
Note: GP = Games played; W = Wins; L = Losses; OTL = Overtime losses; SOL = Shootout losses; GF = Goals for; GA = Goals against; PTS = Points; x = clinched playoff berth; y = clinched division title; z = clinched conference title; w = eliminated.

Shaded Purple denotes divisional leaders, grey are teams in line for playoff seeds 3 through 8 of their conference.

North-East Conference
North Division
Team	Centre	W–L–OTL–SOL	GF–GA	Points
Aurora Tigers	Aurora, Ontario	38-12-1-2	220-122	79
Newmarket Hurricanes	Newmarket, Ontario	25-26-2-0	191-211	52
Pickering Panthers	Pickering, Ontario	22-25-4-2	168-202	50
Lindsay Muskies	Lindsay, Ontario	19-27-3-4	165-203	45
Stouffville Spirit	Stouffville, Ontario	19-30-1-3	147-191	42
East Division
Team	Centre	W–L–OTL–SOL	GF–GA	Points
Kingston Voyageurs	Kingston, Ontario	39-11-1-2	210-138	81
Whitby Fury	Whitby, Ontario	35-14-2-2	227-164	74
Cobourg Cougars	Cobourg, Ontario	34-13-2-4	170-136	74
Wellington Dukes	Wellington, Ontario	33-14-1-5	199-143	72
Trenton Golden Hawks	Trenton, Ontario	34-17-1-1	217-152	70
South-West Conference
South Division
Team	Centre	W–L–OTL–SOL	GF–GA	Points
Toronto Lakeshore Patriots	Toronto, Ontario	35-12-3-3	196-145	76
North York Rangers	Toronto, Ontario	29-18-2-4	200-165	64
St. Michael's Buzzers	Toronto, Ontario	27-19-6-1	185-153	61
Mississauga Chargers	Mississauga, Ontario	25-26-2-0	169-206	52
Toronto Jr. Canadiens	Toronto, Ontario	23-26-3-1	184-213	50*
Oakville Blades	Oakville, Ontario	23-26-0-4	165-212	50
West Division
Team	Centre	W–L–OTL–SOL	GF–GA	Points
Buffalo Jr. Sabres	Amherst, New York	31-16-3-3	253-184	68
Georgetown Raiders	Georgetown, Ontario	31-20-1-1	196-160	64
Milton Icehawks	Milton, Ontario	29-21-0-3	186-193	61
Hamilton Red Wings	Hamilton, Ontario	18-31-1-3	156-227	40
Burlington Cougars	Burlington, Ontario	10-37-2-4	138-272	26
Orangeville Flyers	Orangeville, Ontario	4-46-1-2	122-272	11

(*) denotes that Toronto defeated Oakville 6-5 (OT) in a single game playoff for 8th place.

Teams listed on the official league website.

Standings listed by Pointstreak on official league website.

== 2014 Frank L. Buckland Trophy Playoffs ==
Playoff results are listed by Pointstreak on the official league website

Conference Quarters	Conference Semis
NE1	Kingston	4
NE8	Pickering	1
NE1	Kingston	4
NE6	Trenton	2
NE3	Whitby	2
NE6	Trenton	4
Northeast
NE2	Aurora	4
NE7	Newmarket	0
NE2	Aurora	4
NE4	Cobourg	3
NE4	Cobourg	4
NE5	Wellington	1
SW1	Lakeshore	4
SW8	Toronto	0
SW1	Lakeshore	4
SW4	North York	1
SW4	North York	4
SW5	St. Michael's	1
Southwest
SW2	Buffalo	4
SW7	Mississauga	2
SW2	Buffalo	1
SW3	Georgetown	4
SW3	Georgetown	4
SW6	Milton	0

Conference Finals
NE1	Kingston	0
NE2	Aurora	4
SW1	Lakeshore	4
SW3	Georgetown	0

League Finals
NE2	Aurora	2
SW1	Lakeshore	4

== Dudley Hewitt Cup Championship ==
Hosted by the Wellington Dukes in Wellington, Ontario. The Toronto Lakeshore Patriots represented the league at the event and won it.

Round Robin

Toronto Lakeshore Patriots 4 - Fort Frances Lakers (SIJHL) 1
Wellington Dukes 4 - Kirkland Lake Gold Miners (NOJHL) 1
Toronto Lakeshore Patriots 4 - Kirkland Lake Gold Miners (NOJHL) 1
Wellington Dukes 3 - Fort Frances Lakers (SIJHL) 0
Wellington Dukes 5 - Toronto Lakeshore Patriots 3

Semi-final

Toronto Lakeshore Patriots 6 - Fort Frances Lakers (SIJHL) 0

Final

Toronto Lakeshore Patriots 2 - Wellington Dukes 1

== 2014 Royal Bank Cup Championship ==
Hosted by the Vernon Vipers in Vernon, British Columbia. The Toronto Lakeshore Patriots represented the league at the event and finished fifth in the round robin.

Round Robin

Dauphin Kings (MJHL) 2 - Toronto Lakeshore Patriots 1
Toronto Lakeshore Patriots 5 - Yorkton Terriers (SJHL) 1
Carleton Place Canadians (CCHL) 4 - Toronto Lakeshore Patriots 2
Vernon Vipers (BCHL) 3 - Toronto Lakeshore Patriots 2 (OT)

== Scoring leaders ==
Note: GP = Games played; G = Goals; A = Assists; Pts = Points; PIM = Penalty minutes

Player	Team	GP	G	A	Pts	PIM
Taylor Best	Whitby Fury	48	37	53	90	72
Steve Hladin	Georgetown Raiders	53	38	45	83	36
Pat Egan	Buffalo Jr. Sabres	51	31	47	78	15
Shane Bennett	Milton Merchants	51	36	41	77	122
Liam Kerins	North York Rangers	51	37	37	74	86
Alex Tonge	Kingston Voyageurs	53	29	43	72	36
Kory Kennedy	Aurora Tigers	53	30	41	71	120
Greg Milner	Whitby Fury	53	22	49	71	34
David Italiano	St. Michael's Buzzers	53	39	30	69	64
Brett Seney	Kingston Voyageurs	49	26	43	69	67

== Leading goaltenders ==
Note: GP = Games played; Mins = Minutes played; W = Wins; L = Losses: OTL = Overtime losses; SL = Shootout losses; GA = Goals Allowed; SO = Shutouts; GAA = Goals against average

Player	Team	GP	Mins	W	L	OTL	SOL	GA	SO	Sv%	GAA
Kevin Entmaa	Aurora Tigers	36	2025:56	28	5	0	0	73	5	.925	2.16
Tyson Teichmann	Wellington Dukes	26	1517:48	13	7	1	4	64	1	.925	2.53
Evan Buitenhuis	Toronto Lakeshore Patriots	37	2186:49	21	12	0	3	99	2	.925	2.72
Nathan Perry	Cobourg Cougars	39	2211:47	26	10	0	2	84	2	.923	2.28
Alex Brooks-Potts	Kingston Voyageurs	37	2077:39	26	7	0	2	88	2	.923	2.54

== Award winners ==
- Top Scorer - Taylor Best (Whitby Fury)
- Best Defenceman - Michael Prapavessis (Toronto Lakeshore Patriots)
- Most Gentlemanly Player - Michael Prapavessis (Toronto Lakeshore Patriots)
- Most Improved Player - Taylor Best (Whitby Fury)
- Most Valuable Player - Taylor Best (Whitby Fury)
- Rookie of the Year - Jake Walman (Toronto Jr. Canadiens)
- Coach of the Year - James Richmond (Aurora Tigers)
- Best Goaltender - Kevin Entmaa (Aurora Tigers)
- Humanitarian - Kevin Shier (Toronto Lakeshore Patriots)
- Scholastic - Richard Court (Georgetown Raiders)
- Top Prospect - Jake Walman (Toronto Jr. Canadiens)
- Playoff MVP - Kevin Shier (Toronto Lakeshore Patriots)
- Top Executive - Mike Tarantino (Toronto Lakeshore Patriots)
- Top Trainer - Robb Crawford (Whitby Fury)
- Volunteer of the Year - Hal Gies (Milton Icehawks)

== Players selected in 2014 NHL entry draft ==
- Rd 3 #82 Jake Walman - St. Louis Blues (Toronto Jr. Canadiens)
- Rd 4 #105 Michael Prapavessis - Dallas Stars (Toronto Lakeshore Patriots)
- Rd 6 #178 Dylan Sikura - Chicago Blackhawks (Aurora Tigers)
- Rd 7 #207 Jake Evans - Montreal Canadiens (St. Michael's Buzzers)

== See also ==
- 2014 Royal Bank Cup
- Dudley Hewitt Cup
- List of OJHL seasons
- Northern Ontario Junior Hockey League
- Superior International Junior Hockey League
- Greater Ontario Junior Hockey League
- 2013 in ice hockey
- 2014 in ice hockey

Preceded by 2012–13 OJHL season	OJHL seasons	Succeeded by 2014–15 OJHL season
