= Newmarket Hurricanes (2025) =

Junior ice hockey team

- City: Newmarket, Ontario
- League: OJHL
- Conference: East
- Founded: 2025
- Home arena: Ray Twinney Complex
- Colours
- General manager: Rick Varone
- Head coach: Dave DeMarinis
- Website: newmarkethurricanes.ojhl.ca

Franchise history
- 2006–2025: Toronto Jr. Canadiens
- Since 2025: Newmarket Hurricanes

The Newmarket Hurricanes are a junior ice hockey franchise in the Ontario Junior Hockey League (OJHL) based in Newmarket, Ontario. The team debuted as the Hurricanes in the 2025–26 OJHL season. The franchise previously was based in Toronto and known as the Toronto Jr. Canadiens from 2006–2025.

== Arena ==
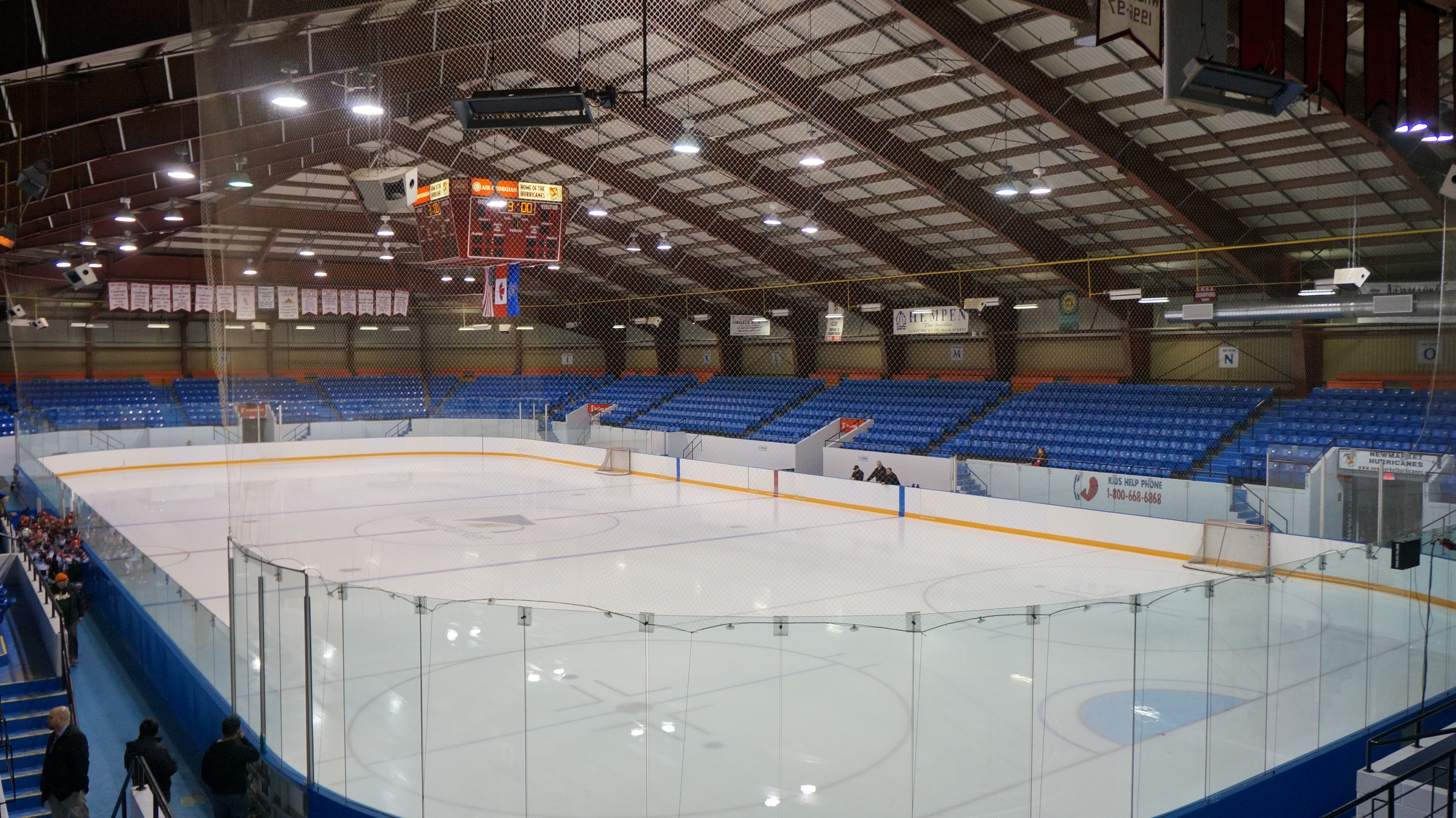
The 3,700-seat main arena at the Ray Twinney Recreation Complex in Newmarket.

The team will play its home games at the Ray Twinney Recreation Complex in Newmarket. The arena was built in 1985 and has a seating capacity of 3,700.

== History ==
In the 2024–25 OJHL regular season, average attendance for Toronto Jr. Canadiens home games was about 95 spectators. That same year, the team played two of its home games in Newmarket and had a turnout of 526 and 478 spectators respectively.

A previous OJHL franchise in Newmarket, also known as the Hurricanes, relocated to Milton in 2019 and rebranded as the Milton Menace. Local news media quoted its former owner saying, "Newmarket doesn’t care about junior hockey."

Statistics
Season	GP	W	L	T	OTL	Pts	GF	GA	Regular season	Post-season
2025–26	56	35	18	2	1	73	226	159	4th in division 8th overall	Won first round against Haliburton County (4:1); Won quarterfinal against Trenton (4:2); Won semifinal against Pickering (4:0); Lost final against Toronto (4:1)

Source: "Newmarket Hurricanes statistics and history". hockeydb.com.

== Sources ==
- Cudmore, John (14 July 2016). "GM Eric Cella's vision of Newmarket Hurricanes' future starts now". YorkRegion.com.
- Cudmore, John (3 April 2019). "Original owners reflect on building Newmarket Hurricanes franchise". YorkRegion.com.
- "OJHL franchise team testing waters for move to Newmarket". NewmarketToday.ca. 9 January 2025.
- Quigley, Joseph (30 June 2025). "Newmarket getting OJHL team for first time in six years". NewmarketToday.ca.
- "OJHL's Jr. Canadiens franchise moving to Newmarket from Toronto". ojhl.ca (Press release). Ontario Junior Hockey League. 1 July 2025.
