= Kingston Voyageurs =

- City: Kingston, Ontario, Canada
- League: Ontario Junior Hockey League
- Founded: 1974
- Folded: 2019
- Home arena: INVISTA Centre
- Colours: Blue, red, white
- Affiliates: Napanee Raiders (EBJCHL); Greater Kingston Frontenacs (OMHA); Kingston Frontenacs (OHL)

The Kingston Voyageurs were a Junior "A" ice hockey team from Kingston, Ontario, Canada. They were a part of the Ontario Junior A Hockey League.

== History ==
The Voyageurs entered the Metro Junior B Hockey League in 1974. The Voyageurs filled the Junior "B" void left when the Kingston Frontenacs jumped from the Eastern Junior B Hockey League in 1972 to the Ontario Provincial Junior A Hockey League and then the Ontario Major Junior Hockey League in 1973 as the Kingston Canadians.

The Voyageurs continued with the league when it became the Metro Junior A Hockey League in 1991 and stuck around until 1995. In 1995, the team jumped to the Ontario Provincial Junior A Hockey League. The Vees were bought in the summer of 2006 by their major sponsor Gregg Rosen from KIMCO Steel Sales Ltd., who promptly spent more money to fix up the teams existing dressing room, build an office above the dressing room for the coaching staff and buy the players new equipment and sticks among other things. The Voyageurs last played out of the Invista Centre.

On April 14, 2009, the Voyageurs won their first Buckland Trophy defeating the Oakville Blades in 5 games. On April 25, 2009, the Voyageurs defeated the Fort William North Stars 4–1 to capture the first Dudley Hewitt Cup in team history. By virtue of the win the Voyageurs qualified for the 2009 Royal Bank Cup. They played their first game of the tournament on May 3 against the host Victoria Grizzlies. They finished in fourth place in the tournament.

In 2011, due to Gregg Rosen being diagnosed with cancer, the team was sold to a group that included Colin Birkas, the head coach of the Greater Kingston Jr. Frontenacs. Evan Robinson was relieved of his head coaching duties and Birkas replaced him. As well, the general manager duties were assumed by Denis Duchesne. During the summer of 2014, Duchesne was relieved of his duties as general manager and the role was filled on an interim basis by Birkas and Rick Poirier. Poirier retired from the team shortly before Christmas 2014. Toward the end of the 2014–15 season, Birkas was suspended for an infraction during a game against the Wellington Dukes, causing assistants Ben Munroe and Dan Clarke to assume the coaching duties. Birkas' suspension was for the balance of the 2014–15 season, the playoffs, and the entire 2015–16 season. Despite this, the Voyageurs rallied and managed to have a magical 2015 playoff run. This was highlighted by a comeback from being down 0–3 against the Aurora Tigers to win in seven games, as well as taking the defending champion Toronto Lakeshore Patriots to Game 7 in the Buckland Cup finals.

Over the Summer of 2015, former assistant coach Peter Goulet was hired as the team's general manager, with Goulet leaving the CCHL's Nepean Raiders in the process. Goulet hired his old assistant coach Taurean White to be the head coach, while also bring in former Kingston Frontenac and NHLer Mark Major and ex-Vee Phil Mangan as assistant coaches. Video Coach Fraser MacAlpine was promoted to Assistant GM. The Vees went on to finish 3rd in the OJHL overall standings, sweeping Cobourg Cougars and Markham Royals in the playoffs before being swept themselves by the eventual Buckland Cup and Dudley Hewitt champions Trenton Golden Hawks.

In the 2016–17 season, the Vees iced a skilled and younger team than in previous years. Despite a winning record playing in the tough East Division, Taurean White was relieved of his duties after the Christmas break. Mark Major took over the head coach job on an interim basis, with new assistant coaches Patrick Shearer and Rob Ridgley on the bench. The Vees would finish last in the East Division, despite finishing with the 8th best record in the league but would be swept by the Royal Bank Cup champions Cobourg Cougars, ending the Vees 15-year first-round winning streak and their 10-year conference finals appearance streak.

Over the summer of 2017, GM Goulet left the ECHL's Brampton Beast to become the new head coach. Under Goulet, the Vees finished 2nd in the East Division, 8 points back of the Wellington Dukes and 4th in the NorthEast Conference with a record of 31-19-2-2. Brandon Nadeau, Rob Clerc, Josh Leblanc, Cole Beckstead and Reid Russell all hit the 100 point plateau in their Vees careers. The Vees faced Cobourg Cougars for the 3rd straight season in the opening round of the playoffs, losing in 5 games.

In the 2018–19 season, the Vees saw their playoff streak of 32 years come to an end with a record of 22-25-2-5 to finish 5th in the East Division. At the end of the season, the Ontario Junior Hockey League board approved the sale of the Voyageurs to the owners of the Ontario Hockey League Barrie Colts, becoming the Collingwood Colts, ending the 46-year tradition of Voyageurs junior hockey in Kingston.

== Season-by-season results ==
Season	GP	W	L	T	OTL	GF	GA	P	Results	Playoffs
1974–75	38	18	14	6	-	216	189	42	7th Metro B	
1975–76	34	13	17	4	-	140	152	30	9th Metro B	
1976–77	34	12	17	5	-	130	162	29	12th Metro B	
1977–78	35	14	15	6	-	141	155	34	9th Metro B	
1978–79	44	25	14	5	-	245	194	55	4th Metro B	
1979–80	42	10	29	3	-	183	248	23	12th Metro B	
1980–81	42	15	23	4	-	181	213	34	9th Metro B	DNQ
1981–82	35	11	17	7	-	160	175	29	8th Metro B	
1982–83	36	11	15	10	-	144	152	32	7th Metro B	
1983–84	42	10	26	6	-	181	233	26	12th Metro B	DNQ
1984–85	36	4	27	5	-	119	219	13	11th Metro B	DNQ
1985–86	37	7	27	3	-	164	304	17	11th Metro B	DNQ
1986–87	37	17	16	4	-	183	163	38	6th Metro B	Lost quarter-final
1987–88	37	22	7	8	-	224	131	52	2nd Metro B	Lost semi-final
1988–89	40	27	8	5	-	262	157	59	2nd Metro B	Lost final
1989–90	44	21	11	12	-	249	192	54	6th Metro B	
1990–91	44	18	18	8	-	223	178	44	7th Metro B	
1991–92	44	30	12	2	-	225	147	62	3rd Metro A	
1992–93	48	17	29	2	-	162	204	36	9th Metro A	
1993–94	50	26	21	3	-	216	207	55	7th Metro A	Lost quarter-final
1994–95	50	21	24	5	-	241	219	47	9th Metro A	
1995–96	50	37	10	3	-	247	135	82	1st OPJHL-R	Lost Conf. SF
1996–97	51	42	7	2	-	313	138	87	1st OPJHL-R	Lost Conf. Final
1997–98	51	23	16	10	2	224	192	58	4th OPJHL-R	
1998–99	51	29	15	5	2	211	179	65	4th OPJHL-E	
1999–00	49	23	20	4	2	193	181	52	5th OPJHL-E	
2000–01	49	25	16	7	1	202	159	58	4th OPJHL-E	
2001–02	49	25	15	6	3	185	141	59	4th OPJHL-E	
2002–03	49	31	13	4	1	206	132	67	3rd OPJHL-E	Lost Conf. SF
2003–04	49	20	18	8	3	171	166	51	4th OPJHL-E	Lost Conf. SF
2004–05	49	23	19	4	3	149	163	53	5th OPJHL-E	Lost Conf. SF
2005–06	49	23	23	2	1	153	179	49	5th OPJHL-E	Lost Conf. SF
2006–07	49	26	17	3	3	195	166	58	4th OPJHL-E	Lost Conf. Finals
2007–08	49	33	13	-	3	188	146	69	2nd OPJHL-E	Lost Conf. Finals
2008–09	49	36	9	-	4	256	136	76	1st OJHL-R	Won League
2009–10	56	46	5	-	5	274	133	97	1st OJAHL	Lost final
2010–11	50	34	11	-	5	242	134	73	2nd OJHL-E	Lost Conf. SF
2011–12	49	23	24	-	2	172	166	48	6th OJHL-E	Lost Conf. Final
2012–13	55	34	15	-	6	168	134	74	2nd OJHL-E	Lost Conf. Final
2013–14	53	39	11	-	3	210	138	81	1st OJHL-E	Lost Conf. Final
2014-15	54	31	17	2	4	208	136	68	3rd OJHL-E	Lost final
2015-16	54	34	14	2	4	199	158	74	2nd of 5 East Div; 2nd of 11 NE Conf; 3rd of 22 OJHL	Won Conf. Quarters 4–0 (Cougars); Won Conf. Semifinals 4–0 (Royals); Lost Conf. Finals, 0–4 (Golden Hawks)
2016-17	54	28	16	3	7	217	194	66	5th of 5 East Div; 5th of 11 NE Conf; 8th of 22 OJHL	Lost Conf. Quarters 0–4 (Cougars)
2017-18	54	31	19	2	2	222	179	66	2nd of 5 East Div; 4th of 11 NE Conf; 9th of 22 OJHL	Lost Conf. Quarters 1–4 (Cougars)

=== Playoffs ===
MetJHL Years

- 1990 Lost semi-final

Kingston Voyageurs defeated Wellington Dukes 4-games-to-3
Wexford Raiders defeated Kingston Voyageurs 4-games-to-none

- 1991 Lost quarter-final

Kingston Voyageurs defeated Markham Thunderbirds 2-games-to-1
Wexford Raiders defeated Kingston Voyageurs 4-games-to-1

- 1992 Lost quarter-final

Wexford Raiders defeated Kingston Voyageurs 4-games-to-1

- 1993 Lost Preliminary

Richmond Hill Riot defeated Kingston Voyageurs 3-games-to-none

- 1994 Lost quarter-final

Wexford Raiders defeated Kingston Voyageurs 4-games-to-1

- 1995 Lost quarter-final

Thornhill Islanders defeated Kingston Voyageurs 4-games-to-none

OJHL Years

== Staff ==
- Owner – Community Sports Entertainment Ltd.
- Owner – Dr. Dijana Oliver
- Owner – Rob Zarichny
- General Manager/Head Coach – Peter Goulet
- Assistant coach – Mark Major
- Assistant coach – Brandon Nadeau
- Video coach – Josh Hardiman
- Goalie Coach – Tom Hertz
- Trainer – William Wilson
- Equipment Manager – Terry Burrows
- Play-by-Play Host/Social Media – Allan Etmanski

== Retired numbers ==
- 2 – Anthony Geldart
- 8 – Daniel Cleary
- 10 – Scott Martin
- 24 – Ryan Vince

== Notable alumni ==
- Alyn McCauley – (Los Angeles Kings)
- Jay McClement – (St. Louis Blues)
- Kirk Muller – (Montreal Canadiens) - (Stanley Cup Champion 1993)
- Doug Gilmour – (Calgary Flames) - (Stanley Cup Champion 1989)
- Bob Wren – (Toronto Maple Leafs)
- Mike Smith – (Phoenix Coyotes)
- Nate Robinson – (Detroit Red Wings)
- Marc Moro – (Toronto Maple Leafs)
- Scott Arniel – (Buffalo Sabres)
- Daniel Cleary – (Detroit Red Wings) - (Stanley Cup Champion 2008)
- Brandon Convery – (Toronto Maple Leafs)
- Todd MacDonald – (Florida Panthers)
- Rik Wilson – (St. Louis Blues)
- Patrick Ashton – (EV Landsberg)
- Jeff Foster – (Milwaukee Admirals)
- Brett Gibson – (Pensacola Ice Pilots)
- Tim Keyes – (Syracuse Crunch)
- Adam McAllister – (Tulsa Oilers)
- Christoffer Kjærgaard – Danish national team
- Scott Harrington – (Toronto Marlies)
- Francesco Vilardi – (Flint Firebirds)
