= Toronto Jr. Canadiens =

Junior ice hockey club, 2006–2025

- City: Toronto
- League: OJHL
- Conference: East
- Founded: 1972
- Home arena: Scotiabank Pond
- Colours

Franchise history
- 1972–1983: Wexford Warriors
- 1983–2006: Wexford Raiders
- 2006–2025: Toronto Jr. Canadiens
- Since 2025: Newmarket Hurricanes

Current uniform

The Toronto Jr. Canadiens was the name of a junior ice hockey franchise in the Ontario Junior Hockey League (OJHL). In 2025, the franchise relocated from the Downsview neighbourhood of Toronto, where it had been based since 2006, to the Town of Newmarket, Ontario, and was rebranded as the Newmarket Hurricanes.

== History ==
The team originated in 1972 as the Wexford Warriors of the Metro Junior B league, when the original Wexford Raiders jumped to the Junior A Ontario Provincial League in 1972. When the Junior A Raiders folded in 1981, the Junior B Warriors adopted the Raider name and kept it until 2006.

The Wexford Raiders were one of the strongest teams to play in the Metro Junior A Hockey League. A losing team for much of its history, they become one of the most dominant squads in 1990, under coaches Stan Butler and Kevin Burkett. Butler and Burkett coached the Wexford Raiders midget team to the 1989 championship, then took most of the players to the Junior B level in 1990, and they served as the foundation to four consecutive Metro championship squads. During the 1990s, under the management of Burkett and Butler, the Raiders sent more players on NCAA Division I hockey scholarships than any other junior team in North America. In 1994, the Raiders defeated the Caledon Canadians 4-games-to-0 in the Metro League final. The Canadians were granted the permission to host the Dudley Hewitt Cup that year and ended up winning it despite losing the Metro final.

In 1998, again playing Caledon, the Raiders won the last Metro Junior "A" title in game 7 by a score of 9–0. In 2006, the Raiders changed their name to the Toronto Jr. Canadiens and took on the colours of the Montreal Canadiens.

On February 11, 2007, after 144 minutes and 32 seconds of play, the Canadiens defeated the Pickering Panthers in Game 2 of the first round of the playoffs. The game-winning goal was credited to Kyle Wetering at the 4:32 mark of the 5th overtime. Toronto outshot Pickering 88–86. On February 12, 2007, TSN show That's Hockey showed highlights of the game and announced that the history of the game may be preserved in the Hockey Hall of Fame as the longest junior hockey game in history, far surpassing the previous record. The game has been officially named the longest game in Ontario Hockey Association history.

In 2025, the league announced the relocation of the franchise to the Ray Twinney Recreation Complex in the Town of Newmarket. The franchise was rebranded as the Newmarket Hurricanes, a callback to the Newmarket Hurricanes (1997–2019) that rebranded as the Milton Menace in 2019.

== Season-by-season results ==
Toronto Jr. Canadiens
Season	GP	W	L	T	OTL	SOL	Pts	Pct	GF	GA	Finish	Playoffs
2006–07	49	26	16	5	2	0	59	0.602	202	162	4th in division	Lost first round against Pickering (4:3)
2007–08	49	29	18	0	2	0	60	0.612	223	175	4th in division	Won first round against North York (3:2); Lost second round against St. Michael's (4:2)
2008–09	53	31	20	0	1	1	64	0.604	242	251	3rd in division	Won first round against St. Michael's (4:2); Won second round against Markham (4:3); Lost third round against Wellington (4:1)
2009–10	50	27	19	0	3	1	58	0.58	218	195	6th in division	Lost in first round against Hamilton (4:3)
2010–11	50	16	30	0	1	3	36	0.36	136	207	6th overall	Did not qualify
2011–12	49	18	24	0	5	2	43	0.439	156	184	5th in division	Won first round against North York (3:1); Lost second round against St. Michael's (4:2)
2012–13	55	27	23	0	2	3	59	0.536	176	179	5th in division	Lost first round against St.Michael's (4:2)
2013–14	54	24	26	0	3	1	52	0.481	190	218	5th in division	Lost first round against Lakeshore (4:0)
2014–15	54	31	22	0	0	1	63	0.583	183	149	3rd in division	Won first round against North York (4:2); Won second round against Georgetown (4:0); Lost third round against Lakeshore (4:2)
2015–16	54	30	16	3	5	0	68	0.63	184	170	3rd in division 9th overall	Lost first round against Burlington (4:1)
2016–17	54	32	20	0	0	2	62	0.611	177	164	3rd in division 9th overall	Won first round against St. Michael's (4:3); Lost second round against Georgetown (4:0)
2017–18	54	33	18	1	1	1	69	0.639	202	166	4th in division 8th overall	Lost first round against Blades (4:2)
2018–19	54	27	23	1	2	1	58	0.537	166	180	4th in division 8th overall	Lost first round against North York (4:1)
2019–20	54	38	10	2	3	1	82	0.759	207	144	1st in division 4th overall	Playoffs incomplete
2020–21	Season cancelled											
2021–22	54	41	12	1	0	0	83	0.769	235	118	1st in division 1st overall	Won first round against Patriots (2:0); Won second round against North York; Won fourth round against Cobourg (3:1); Lost final against Pickering (4:3)
2022–23	54	45	5	2	2	0	94	0.87	256	105	1st in conference 4th overall	Won first round against North York (4:0); Lost second round against Trenton (4:3)
2023–24	56	31	19	3	3	0	68	0.607	210	165	6th in conference 10th overall	Won first round against Wellington (4:1); Lost second round against Trenton (4:0)
2024–25	56	42	11	0	3	0	87	0.777	205	123	2nd in conference 4th overall	Won first round against Cobourg (4:1); Lost second round against Haliburton (4:2)

Source: "Toronto Jr. Canadiens hockey team statistics and history". hockeydb.com.

=== Playoffs ===
MetJHL Years

- 1990 Lost final

Wexford Raiders defeated Oshawa Legionaires 4-games-to-3
Wexford Raiders defeated Kingston Voyageurs 4-games-to-none
Thornhill Thunderbirds defeated Wexford Raiders 4-games-to-3

- 1991 Won League

Wexford Raiders defeated Kingston Voyageurs 4-games-to-1
Wexford Raiders defeated Oshawa Legionaires 4-games-to-3
Wexford Raiders defeated Bramalea Blues 4-games-to-3 METJHL CHAMPIONS

- 1992 Won League

Wexford Raiders defeated Kingston Voyageurs 4-games-to-1
Wexford Raiders defeated Thornhill Thunderbirds 4-games-to-2
Wexford Raiders defeated Bramalea Blues 4-games-to-none METJHL CHAMPIONS

- 1993 Won League

Wexford Raiders defeated Richmond Hill Riot 4-games-to-none
Wexford Raiders defeated Wellington Dukes 4-games-to-none
Wexford Raiders defeated St. Michael's Buzzers 4-games-to-1 METJHL CHAMPIONS

- 1994 Won League, lost OHA Buckland Cup round robin

Wexford Raiders defeated Kingston Voyageurs 4-games-to-1
Wexford Raiders defeated Thornhill Islanders 4-games-to-none
Wexford Raiders defeated Caledon Canadians 4-games-to-none METJHL CHAMPIONS
Third and eliminated in OHA Buckland Cup round robin (1-2)

- 1995 Lost final

Wexford Raiders defeated Wellington Dukes 4-games-to-2
Wexford Raiders defeated Thornhill Islanders 4-games-to-3
Caledon Canadians defeated Wexford Raiders 4-games-to-none

- 1996 Lost semi-final

Wexford Raiders defeated Wellington Dukes 4-games-to-1
Thornhill Islanders defeated Wexford Raiders 4-games-to-2

- 1997 Lost semi-final

Wexford Raiders defeated Niagara Scenic 4-games-to-none
First in round robin quarter-final (4-2)
Caledon Canadians defeated Wexford Raiders 4-games-to-none

- 1998 Won League, lost OHA Buckland Cup

Wexford Raiders defeated Quinte Hawks 3-games-to-none
Wexford Raiders defeated Oshawa Legionaires 4-games-to-2
Wexford Raiders defeated Caledon Canadians 4-games-to-3 METJHL CHAMPIONS
Milton Merchants (OPJHL) defeated Wexford Raiders 4-games-to-1

== Raiders ==
Wexford Raiders
- City: Scarborough, Ontario, Canada
- League: Ontario Provincial Junior A Hockey League; Metro Junior B Hockey League
- Operated: 1970–1981
- Colours: Green; Black

Franchise history
- 1970–1971: Toronto Raiders
- 1971–1981: Wexford Raiders
- 1981: Folded

There also was a Wexford Raiders team in the Ontario Provincial Junior League based in the Wexford neighbourhood of the Toronto suburb of Scarborough. The team originated in 1970 as the Toronto Raiders of the Metro Junior B league, and was renamed the Wexford Raiders in 1971. In 1972, the team moved to the new Ontario Provincial Junior League in 1972 and operated until 1981. After the Junior A team folded, the Metro B "Warriors" assumed the "Raider" name in 1983.

=== Season-by-season results ===
Season	GP	W	L	T	OTL	GF	GA	P	Results	Playoffs
Toronto Raiders
1970-71	44	17	22	5	-	208	241	39	8th Metro B	
Wexford Raiders
1971-72	44	20	19	5	-	206	210	45	6th Metro B	
1972-73	44	26	9	9	-	264	185	61	2nd OPJHL	Won League
1973–74	44	26	12	6	-	235	172	58	3rd OPJHL	Won League
1974-75	44	22	15	7	-	241	196	51	4th OPJHL	
1975-76	44	19	19	6	-	207	196	44	4th OPJHL	
1976-77	44	20	21	3	-	211	219	43	7th OPJHL	
1977-78	50	18	25	7	-	268	308	43	6th OPJHL	
1978-79	50	14	31	5	-	208	280	33	10th OPJHL	
1979-80	44	17	20	7	-	238	241	41	8th OPJHL	
1980-81	44	11	32	1	-	234	334	23	12th OPJHL	

=== Playoffs ===
- 1973 Won League, lost OHA Buckland Cup

Wexford Raiders defeated Weston Dodgers 4-games-to-1
Wexford Raiders defeated Dixie Beehives 4-games-to-2
Wexford Raiders defeated Toronto Nationals 4-games-to-1 OPJHL CHAMPIONS
Chatham Maroons (SOJHL) defeated Wexford Raiders 4-games-to-3

- 1974 Won League, won OHA Buckland Cup, lost Hewitt-Dudley Memorial Trophy semi-final

Wexford Raiders defeated Richmond Hill Rams 4-games-to-2
Wexford Raiders defeated North Bay Trappers 4-games-to-3
Wexford Raiders defeated Aurora Tigers 4-games-to-1 OPJHL CHAMPIONS
Wexford Raiders defeated Windsor Spitfires (SOJHL) 4-games-to-3 BUCKLAND CUP CHAMPIONS
Thunder Bay Hurricanes (TBJHL) defeated Wexford Raiders 4-games-to-3

- 1975 Lost final

Wexford Raiders defeated Aurora Tigers 4-games-to-none
Wexford Raiders defeated North York Rangers 4-games-to-3
Toronto Nationals defeated Wexford Raiders 4-games-to-1

- 1976 Lost quarter-final

North Bay Trappers defeated Wexford Raiders 4-games-to-2

- 1977 Lost quarter-final

Royal York Royals defeated Wexford Raiders 4-games-to-2

- 1978 Lost quarter-final

Guelph Platers defeated Wexford Raiders 4-games-to-none

- 1979 DNQ
- 1980 Lost quarter-final

Dixie Beehives defeated Wexford Raiders 4-games-to-none

- 1981 DNQ

== Arena ==
Beginning in the 2025–26 OJHL season, the Jr. Canadiens play their home games at Ray Twinney Recreation Complex in Newmarket. From 2006 to 2025, they played at the Scotiabank Pond at Downsview Park in Toronto.

== Notable alumni ==
Wexford Warriors

- George Servinis
- Greg Theberge

Wexford Raiders

- Al Secord
- Andy Chiodo
- Anson Carter
- Brad Tapper
- Brian Boucher
- Brian Bradley
- Chris Kotsopoulos
- Daniel Winnik
- Dave Duerden
- Derrick Smith
- Doug Doull
- Gavin Morgan
- George Servinis
- Iain Duncan
- Jeff Ware
- Keith Acton
- Larry Floyd
- Mark Botell
- Mark Kirton
- Mark Napier
- Matt Foy
- Mike Zigomanis
- Paul Lawless
- Scott Fraser
- Steve Guolla
- Steve Maltais
- Steve Rooney

Toronto Jr. Canadiens

- Jake Walman
- Ryan O'Reilly
- Tyler Toffoli
