= Wellington Dukes =

- City: Wellington, Ontario, Canada
- League: Ontario Junior Hockey League
- Founded: Prior to 1977
- Home arena: Lehigh Arena
- Colours: Red, Yellow, and Blue
- General manager: Jacob Panetta
- Head coach: Jacob Panetta
- Affiliates: Picton Pirates (PJHL)

Championships
- Playoff championships: 3: 2003, 2011, 2018

The Wellington Dukes are a Junior "A" ice hockey team from Wellington, Ontario, Canada. They are in the Eastern Division of the Ontario Junior Hockey League and used to be a part of the Metro Junior A Hockey League. Originally a Junior C team in the 1970s and 1980s, the Dukes merged with the neighbouring Jr. B Belleville Bobcats and took their place in the Metro League. The Dukes have won the Dudley Hewitt Cup as Central Canadian Junior A Champions three times (2003, 2011, 2018). The Dukes also won the Buckland Cup (OJHL Champions) for the third time on April 22, 2018.

== History ==
In the 1970s and early 1980s, the Wellington Dukes were members of the Quinte-St. Lawrence Junior C Hockey League. The league folded in 1986. The Dukes joined the Central Junior C Hockey League in 1986. They moved up to Metro "B" in 1989 when they took over the Belleville Bobcats franchise, and moved up to Junior "A" in 1991. The Dukes have been in the OPJHL since 1998. In 2003, the Dukes defeated the Aurora Tigers 4-games-to-2 to win the Frank L. Buckland Trophy. At the Dudley Hewitt Cup tournament, the Dukes first beat the Fort Frances Borderland Thunder of the Superior International Junior Hockey League by a score of 7–1. They were defeated 2–1 by the North Bay Skyhawks of the Northern Ontario Junior Hockey League. They then defeated the Thunder Bay Bulldogs of the SIJHL 7–4 to finish second in the round robin. In the semi-final, the Dukes defeated Fort Frances 4–2. In the final, they defeated the North Bay Skyhawks by a convincing score of 4–0 to win the Central Canadian Championship.

At the Royal Bank Cup 2003, their National tournament started with a 4–1 loss to the Saskatchewan Junior Hockey League's Humboldt Broncos. In the second game, the Dukes were embarrassed by the Alberta Junior Hockey League's Camrose Kodiaks 7–1. In the third game, the Dukes battled for their lives. In a hard battle with the Charlottetown Abbies of the Maritime Junior A Hockey League the Dukes prevailed 1–0 in overtime. Their final round robin game, the Dukes defeated the Lennoxville Cougars of the Quebec Junior AAA Hockey League 5–2 to finish third in the round robin. In the semi-finals, the Dukes squared off against Humboldt again and were defeated 3–2. Humboldt moved on to win the Royal Bank Cup as National Champions.

In 2008, the Dukes joined the semi-autonomous Central Division, that formed the Central Canadian Hockey League in 2009 when the OJHL was dissolved.

The Wellington Dukes defeated the hosts Huntsville Otters 5–3 to win the 2011 Dudley-Hewitt Cup. The Dukes travelled west to participate in the Royal Bank Cup in Camrose, Alberta. Wellington returned to the Quinte after a 4–1 loss to the Vernon Vipers.

Wellington was chosen to host the 2014 Dudley-Hewitt Cup at their new arena. The Dukes finished no higher than 5th in the North-East conference losing to the Cobourg Cougars in the first round 4 games to 1. The Dukes endured nearly 2 months of a playoff layoff. The Dukes entered the tournament. The Dukes finished the round robin with a 3–0 record, but lost the final to the Toronto Lakeshore Patriots 2–1.

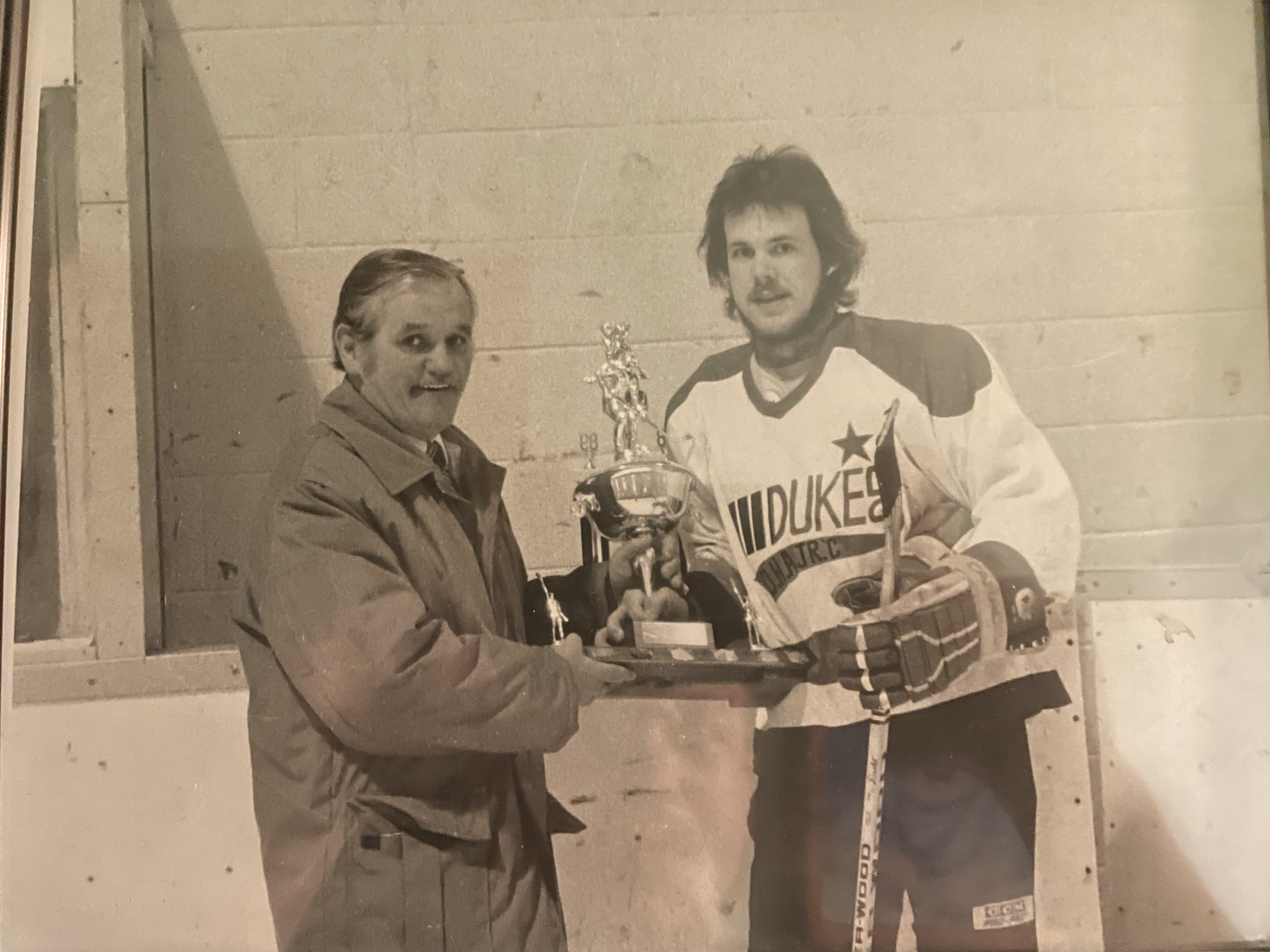
Howie Dowdle receiving the top scorer award in his record setting season with the Wellington Dukes.

The franchise scoring record was set by Howie Dowdle in 1988-89 scoring 51 goals, and 73 assists in 39 games played. This feat won Howie the Elleanor Gilliam Memorial Trophy as the Central Ontario Jr. "C" Scoring Champion.

== Season-by-season record ==
Note: GP = Games Played, W = Wins, L = Losses, T = Ties, OTL = Overtime Losses, GF = Goals for, GA = Goals against

Year	GP	W	L	T	OTL	GF	GA	PTS	Finish	Playoffs
1977-78	32	21	10	1	-	194	146	43	1st QSLJHL	
1978-79	Standings Not Available									
1979-80	32	13	16	3	-	169	179	29	4th QSLJHL	
1980-81	34	15	13	6	-	--	--	36	3rd QSLJHL	
1981-82	34	11	17	6	-	--	--	28	5th QSLJHL	
1982-83	34	23	6	5	-	246	116	51	1st QSLJHL	Won League
1983-84	Standings Not Available									
1984-85	30	11	14	5	-	165	174	27	4th QSLJHL	
1985-86	Standings Not Available									
1986-87	Central Jr. C Standings Not Available									
1987-88	32	22	7	3	-	222	142	47	3rd COJCHL	
1988-89	40	23	12	5	-	275	172	51	2nd COJCHL	Lost final (Lakefield)
1989-90	44	25	15	4	-	235	178	54	5th Metro B	Lost quarter-final (Kingston)
1990-91	44	24	14	6	-	209	180	54	4th Metro B	Lost quarter-final (Oshawa)
1991-92	44	19	22	3	-	180	195	41	7th Metro A	Lost Preliminary (Pickering)
1992-93	48	28	17	3	-	248	188	59	2nd Metro A	Lost semi-final (Wexford)
1993-94	50	28	20	2	-	263	225	58	5th Metro A	Lost quarter-final (Thornhill)
1994-95	50	27	18	5	-	231	191	59	3rd Metro A	Lost quarter-final (Wexford)
1995-96	52	26	23	3	-	219	222	55	7th Metro A	Lost quarter-final (Wexford)
1996-97	50	21	26	3	-	212	224	45	8th Metro A	Lost Division Semi-final (Quinte)
1997-98	50	23	22	5	-	223	213	51	7th Metro A	Lost quarter-final (Oshawa)
1998-99	51	23	23	3	2	205	223	51	7th OPJHL-E	Lost Division Quarter-final (Trenton)
1999-00	49	33	9	6	1	257	144	73	2nd OPJHL-E	Lost Division Final (Lindsay)
2000-01	49	30	9	6	4	226	142	70	2nd OPJHL-E	Lost Division Semi-final (Trenton)
2001-02	49	37	5	7	0	238	116	81	1st OPJHL-E	Lost final (Brampton)
2002-03	49	47	1	1	0	298	87	95	1st OPJHL-E	Won League(x1) (Aurora); Won DHC (North Bay); Lost RBC Semi-final (Humboldt)
2003-04	49	37	5	3	4	253	134	81	1st OPJHL-E	Lost Division Final (Bowmanville)
2004-05	49	35	11	2	1	222	148	73	2nd OPJHL-E	Lost Division Final (Port Hope)
2005-06	49	33	8	6	2	261	120	74	3rd OPJHL-E	Lost Division Semi-final (Port Hope)
2006-07	49	38	5	4	2	219	92	82	2nd OPJHL-E	Lost final (Aurora)
2007-08	49	34	11	-	4	202	113	72	1st OPJHL-E	Lost Conference Final (Markham)
2008-09	53	35	13	-	5	252	181	75	1st OJHL-C	Lost semi-final (Oakville)
2009-10	50	31	12	-	7	172	128	69	2nd CCHL-E	Lost Division Final (Bowmanville)
2010-11	50	38	7	-	5	197	128	81	1st OJHL-E	Won League (x2) (Oakville); Won DHC (Huntsville); Lost RBC Semi-final (Vernon)
2011-12	49	33	12	-	4	208	124	70	3rd OJHL-E	Lost div quarter-final (Kingston)
2012-13	55	29	22	-	4	162	148	62	4th OJHL-E	Lost Conf Quarter-final (Kingston)
2013-14	53	33	14	-	6	199	143	72	4th OJHL-E	Lost Conf Quarter-final (Cobourg)
2014-15	-	-	-	-	-	-	-	-	-	-
2015-16	54	32	19	2	1	202	154	67	3rd of 5 East Div; 4th of 11 NE Conf; 10th of 22 OJHL	Won Conf. Quarters 4-2 (Aurora); Lost Conf. Semifinals 1-4 (Golden Hawks)
2016-17	54	31	19	3	1	190	140	66	4th of 5 East Div; 4th of 11 NE Conf; 7th of 22 OJHL	Won Conf. Quarters 4-3 (Fury); Lost Conf. Semifinals, 1-4 (Cougars)
2017-18	54	33	13	3	5	207	153	74	1st of 5 East; 2nd of 11 NE Conf; 5th of 22 OJHL	Won Conf. Quarters 4-3 (Panthers); Won Conf. Semifinals 4-3 (Hurricanes); Won Conf. Finals 4-1 (Aurora); Won OJHL Finals 4-2 (Raiders); OJHL Champions (x3)
2018-19	54	29	19	1	5	193	167	64	4th of 6 East; 5th of 11 SE Conf; 7th of 22 OJHL	Won Conf. Quarters 4-1 (Cougars); Won Conf. Semifinals 4-3 (Fury); Won Conf. Finals 4-3 (rangers); Lost OJHL Finals 0-4(Blades)
2019-20	54	42	9	2	0	242	132	86	1st of 5 East; 1st of 11 NE Conf; 1st of 22 OJHL	Won Conf. Quarters 4-0 (Cougars); Remaining playoffs cancelled due to COVID_19 pandemic(x3)
2020-21	Season cancelled due to COVID-19									
2021-22	55	34	13	1	7	204	145	76	1st of 5 East; 3rd of 11 SE Conf; 8th of 21 OJHL	Lost Conf. Quarters 0-2 (Cougars)
2022-23	54	37	11	4	2	252	134	80	2nd of 11 SE Conf; 4th of 21 OJHL	Won Conf. Quarters 4-1 (Buzzers); Won Conf. Semifinals 4-0 (Huskies); Lost Conf. Finals 1-4 (GoldenHawks)
2023-24	56	35	18	0	3	213	159	73	3rd of 12 East Conf; 6th of 24 OJHL	Lost Conf. Quarters 1-4 (Jr. Canadiens)
2024-25	56	33	19	0	4	236	185	70	5th of 12 East Conf; 9th of 24 OJHL	Lost Conf. Quarters 0-4 (Spirit)

=== Playoffs ===
MetJHL Years

- 1990 Lost quarter-final

Kingston Voyageurs defeated Wellington Dukes 4-games-to-3

- 1991 Lost quarter-final

Oshawa Legionaires defeated Wellington Dukes 4-games-to-2

- 1992 Lost Preliminary

Pickering Panthers defeated Wellington Dukes 3-games-to-none

- 1993 Lost semi-final

Wellington Dukes defeated North York Rangers 4-games-to-none
Wexford Raiders defeated Wellington Dukes 4-games-to-none

- 1994 Lost quarter-final

Thornhill Islanders defeated Wellington Dukes 4-games-to-1

- 1995 Lost quarter-final

Wexford Raiders defeated Wellington Dukes 4-games-to-2

- 1996 Lost quarter-final

Wexford Raiders defeated Wellington Dukes 4-games-to-1

- 1997 Lost Preliminary

Quinte Hawks defeated Wellington Dukes 4-games-to-1

- 1998 Lost quarter-final

Oshawa Legionaires defeated Wellington Dukes 3-games-to-2

OJHL Years

== Dudley Hewitt Cup ==
Central Canada Jr. A Championships
NOJHL – OJHL – SIJHL – Host
Round-robin play with 2nd vs. 3rd in semifinal to advance against 1st in the finals.

Year	Round-robin	Record	Standing	Semifinal	Gold medal game
2003; Fort Frances, ON	W, Thunder Bay Bulldogs 7–4; W, Fort Frances Borderland Thunder 7–1; L, North Bay Skyhawks 1–2	2–1–0	2nd of 4	W, Fort Frances Borderland Thunder 3–2	W, North Bay Skyhawks 4–0; Dudley Hewitt Cup Champions
2011; Huntsville, ON	W, Wisconsin Wilderness 7–2; W, Soo Eagles 4–0; 2OTL, Huntsville Otters 2–3	2–0–1	2nd of 4	W, Soo Eagles 3–2 (4OT)	W, Huntsville Otters 5–3; Dudley Hewitt Cup Champions
2018; Dryden, ON	L, Dryden Ice Dogs 1–4; W, Thunder Bay North Stars 4–1; W, Cochrane Crunch 2–0	2–1–0	2nd of 4	W, Thunder Bay North Stars 6–3	W, Dryden Ice Dogs 7–4; Dudley Hewitt Cup Champions

== Royal Bank Cup ==
Canadian Jr. A National Championships
Dudley Hewitt Champions – Central, Fred Page Champions – Eastern, Doyle Cup Champion – Pacific, ANAVET Cup Champion – Western, and Host
Round-robin play with top four in semifinal games and winners to finals.

Year	Round-robin	Record W–OTW–OTL–L	Standing	Semifinal	Gold medal game
2003; Charlottetown, PEI	L, Humboldt Broncos (Western) 1–4; L, Camrose Kodiaks (Pacific) 1–7; OTW, Charlottetown Abbies (Host) 1–0; W, Lennoxville Cougars (Eastern) 5–2	1–1–0–2	3rd of 5	L, Humboldt Broncos 2–3	—
2011; Camrose, AB	L, Camrose Kodiaks (Host) 2–3; L, Pembroke Lumber Kings (Eastern) 2–5; L, Vernon Vipers (Pacific) 2–5; W, Portage Terriers (Western) 6–3	1–0–0–3	4th of 5	L, Vernon Vipers 1–4	—
2018; Chilliwack, BC	OTL, Ottawa Jr. Senators (Eastern) 1–2; OTW, Steinbach Pistons (Western) 3–2; L, Chilliwack Chiefs (Host) 0–2; L, Wenatchee Wild (Pacific) 1–7	0–1–1–2	4th of 5	W, Wenatchee Wild 2–1	L, Chilliwack Chiefs 2–4

== Notable alumni ==
- Sean Brown
- Matt Cooke
- Andrew Raycroft
- Liam Reddox
- Derek Smith
