= Ryan Ramsay =

Canadian ice hockey player (born 1983)

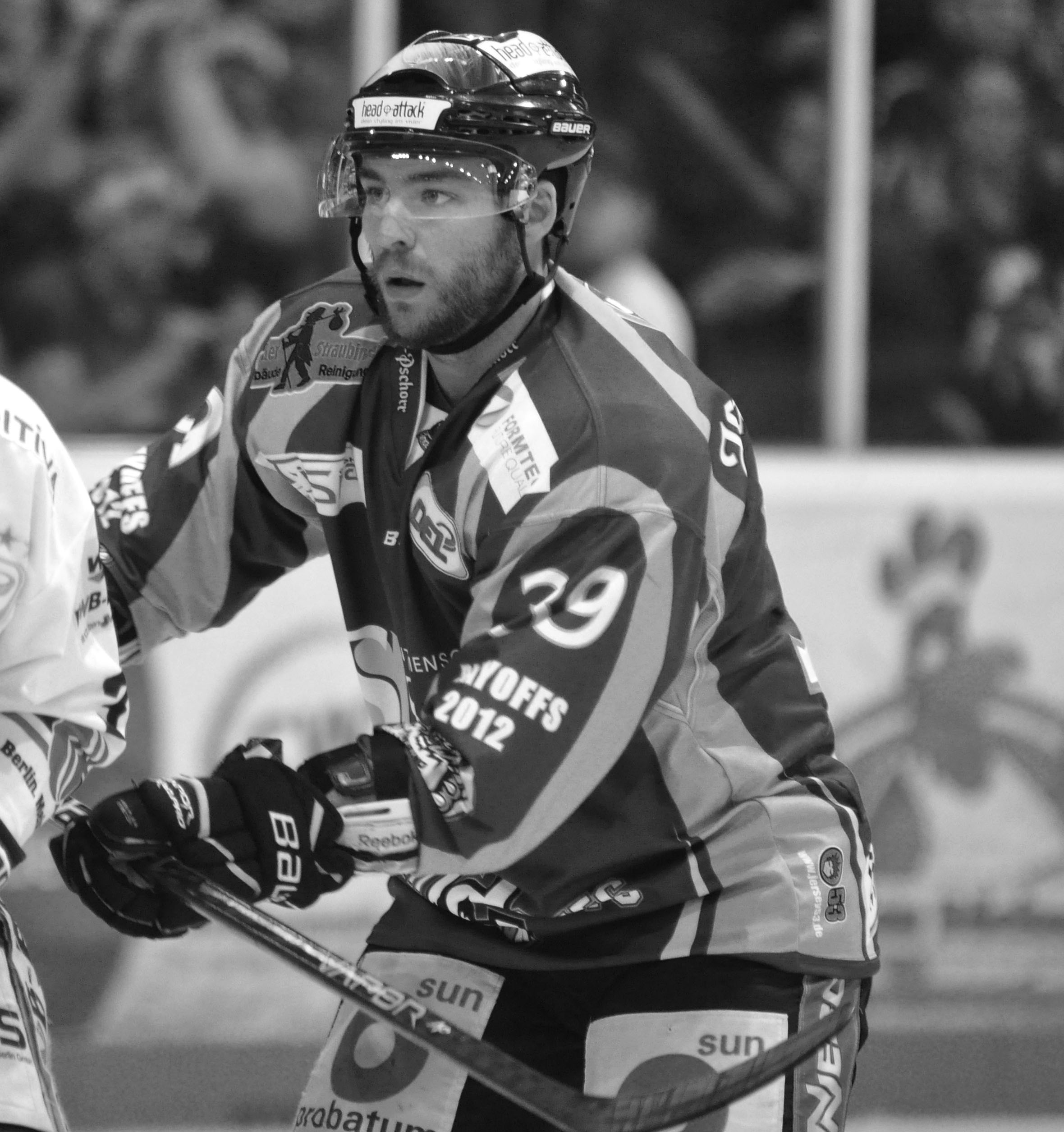
- Born: May 18, 1983 (age 42) Ajax, Ontario, Canada
- Height: 5 ft 11 in (180 cm)
- Weight: 194 lb (88 kg; 13 st 12 lb)
- Position: Centre
- Shot: Left
- Played for: Worcester IceCats; Peoria Rivermen; Krefeld Pinguine; DEG Metro Stars; Straubing Tigers; Kölner Haie; Ritten-Renon; Schwenninger Wild Wings
- NHL draft: Undrafted
- Playing career: 2004–2015

Ryan Ramsay (born May 18, 1983) is a Canadian former professional ice hockey player. He has previously played in the Deutsche Eishockey Liga (DEL) for the Krefeld Pinguine, DEG Metro Stars, Straubing Tigers, Kölner Haie and the Straubing Tigers. He was signed as a free agent to a one-year contract with Schwenninger Wild Wings on July 21, 2013., where he played for two seasons before retiring from his playing career. He currently runs a hockey camp for boys.
