= Markham Waxers =

- City: Markham, Ontario, Canada
- League: Ontario Hockey Association; Metro Junior A Hockey League; Ontario Junior Hockey League
- Operated: 1930s-2012
- Home arena: Markham Fairgrounds 1930s-1960 Crosby Memorial Arena 1960-1963; Markham Village Arena 1963-1970s Markham Centennial Centre 1970s-2012
- Colours: Blue and White

Franchise history
- 1910-1911: Markham Midgets
- 1941-1961: Markham Jets (Millionaires 1946)
- 1963-1972: Markham Seal-a-Wax
- 1972-2012: Markham Waxers

The Markham Waxers were an Ontario Junior Hockey League (OJHL) Junior "A" ice hockey team based in Markham, Ontario, Canada. The Waxers name is still used by the Markham Waxers minor hockey club with the Eastern AAA Hockey League, a sub league of the Ontario Minor Hockey Association.

== History ==
Originally known as the Markham Jets, the Waxers organization changed names in 1961, named after The International Group, a privately owned wax and oil refinery that originated in Agincourt, ON. The team won the 1941 Ontario Junior "C" Championship and won the Ontario Junior "B" Sutherland Cup Championship in 1969 and 1972. At one point, the Waxers were the farm team of the National Hockey League's Toronto Maple Leafs and boasts over 100 NHL and World Hockey Association graduates. The Waxers were formerly a part of the Metro Junior A Hockey League before joining the Ontario Provincial Junior A Hockey League.

During the 2002 Season the Waxers celebrated 100 years of association with the OHA. They had special 3rd jerseys made up and all players were numbered from 100–198, by adding a 1 to the front of the player's regular number. One of these jerseys was donated to the Hockey Hall of Fame, as they believe only one other team in history has ever used such numbering for its players. They finished that season by winning the South Division championship the franchise's first Championship in many years.

On August 1, 2012, the Waxers announced they were suspending operations for the 2012–13 season.

On June 15, 2013, the Ontario Junior Hockey League announced that the Markham Waxers had their membership terminated. The Waxers failed to fulfill several obligations required by the league and the governing Ontario Hockey Association. The OJHL mentioned that Markham has a rich tradition in junior hockey and would like to see a team back in Markham for the 2014–15.

On April 29. 2015, the City of Markham held a major Press conference and the Mayor announced, to a large jubilant crowd, that the Hamilton Red Wings Jr A Hockey Club was relocating to Markham. The Hockey Club acquired the rights to the Waxers Junior A, and has opted to play in the OJHL as the Markham Royals. The Royals were the sister club of the Waxers dating back to the 1970s.

The OJHL's Markham Royals will begin league play in the 2015–16 season reviving the rich tradition of Junior hockey in the City of Markham.

== Sutherland Cup appearances ==
1968: Sarnia Legionnaires defeated Markham Waxers 4-games-to-none
1969: Markham Waxers defeated Strathroy Rockets 4-games-to-2
1972: Markham Waxers defeated St. Marys Lincolns 4-games-to-1

== Notable alumni ==
- Bruce Boudreau
- Jerry Dupont
- Bob Essensa
- Cameron Gaunce
- Brian Hayward
- Cody Hodgson
- Charlie Huddy
- Peter Ing
- Mike Liut
- Steve Ludzik
- Dan Maloney
- Dennis Maruk
- Greg Millen
- Adam Oates
- Mike Palmateer
- Rick Tabaracci
- Chris Tanev
- Steve Thomas
- Steve Vickers
- Ron Wilson

== Season-by-season results ==
Season	GP	W	L	T	OTL	GF	GA	P	Results	Playoffs
1963-64	32	15	11	6	-	162	124	36	6th Metro B	
1964-65	36	14	19	3	-	167	196	31	8th Metro B	
1965-66	35	18	9	8	-	149	128	44	3rd Metro B	
1966-67	36	22	11	3	-	217	105	47	2nd Metro B	
1967-68	36	17	17	2	-	155	152	36	5th Metro B	Won League
1968-69	36	26	6	4	-	167	132	56	1st Metro B	Won League, won SC
1969-70	36	26	6	4	-	209	133	56	2nd Metro B	
1970-71	44	24	18	2	-	209	193	50	6th Metro B	
1971-72	44	37	4	3	-	308	120	77	1st Metro B	Won League, won SC
1972-73	35	19	13	3	-	174	150	41	3rd Metro B	
1973-74	44	13	25	6	-	168	222	32	10th OPJHL	
1974-75	44	15	19	10	-	174	192	40	10th OPJHL	
1975-76	44	19	20	5	-	178	197	43	6th OPJHL	
1976-77	44	23	10	11	-	237	195	57	3rd OPJHL	
1977-78	50	17	27	6	-	229	284	40	8th OPJHL	
1978-79	50	17	27	6	-	220	242	40	7th OPJHL	
1979-80	44	14	23	7	-	233	253	35	10th OPJHL	
1980-81	44	18	25	1	-	247	251	37	8th OPJHL	
1981-82	50	26	19	5	-	304	265	57	4th OJHL	Lost final
1982-83	48	18	24	6	-	227	249	42	7th OJHL	
1983-84	42	18	19	5	-	228	199	41	5th OJHL	
1984-85	48	20	25	3	-	229	263	43	5th OJHL	
1985-86	50	25	16	9	-	244	263	59	2nd OJHL	
1986-87	44	14	22	7	-	210	231	35	4th OJHL	
1987-88	44	3	38	3	-	130	333	9	14th CJBHL	
1988-89	42	10	29	3	-	158	281	23	14th CJBHL	
1989-90	42	12	19	11	-	196	233	35	8th CJBHL	
1990-91	42	16	21	5	-	163	193	37	10th CJBHL	
1991-92	42	17	20	5	-	213	208	39	10th CJBHL	
1992-93	48	33	13	2	-	293	222	69	4th CJBHL	
1993-94	40	19	17	4	-	199	191	43	4th OPJHL-E	
1994-95	48	15	30	3	-	231	273	36	7th OPJHL-E	
1995-96	52	30	17	5	-	241	204	65	5th Metro A	Lost quarter-final
1996-97	50	27	19	4	-	246	221	58	7th Metro A	
1997-98	50	24	19	7	-	247	192	55	6th Metro A	
1998-99	51	29	16	4	2	249	195	64	5th OPJHL-C	
1999-00	48	24	18	3	3	211	193	54	4th OPJHL-S	
2000-01	49	28	18	2	1	223	182	59	3rd OPJHL-S	
2001-02	49	26	17	4	2	223	213	58	3rd OPJHL-S	
2002-03	49	30	12	6	1	239	173	67	2nd OPJHL-S	Lost semi-final
2003-04	49	24	17	3	5	219	207	56	4th OPJHL-S	
2004-05	49	30	16	3	0	213	160	63	4th OPJHL-S	
2005-06	49	29	14	5	1	193	152	64	2nd OPJHL-S	Lost Conf. Final
2006-07	49	31	16	2	0	199	158	64	3rd OPJHL-S	Lost Conf. SF
2007-08	49	36	11	-	2	259	168	74	3rd OPJHL-S	
2008-09	53	36	15	-	2	239	200	74	2nd OJHL-C	
2009-10	50	29	15	0	6	210	175	64	3rd CCHL-E	Lost quarter-final
2010-11	50	34	12	-	4	241	152	72	2nd OJHL-N	Lost Round of 16
2011-12	49	30	17	-	2	216	185	62	4th OJHL-N	Lost Division SF

=== Playoffs ===
Original OPJHL Years

- 1974 DNQ
- 1975 DNQ
- 1976 Lost semi-final

Markham Waxers defeated Richmond Hill Rams 3-games-to-2 with 2 ties
North Bay Trappers defeated Markham Waxers 4-games-to-3

- 1977 Lost semi-final

Markham Waxers defeated Toronto Nationals 4-games-to-none
North Bay Trappers defeated Markham Waxers 4-games-to-3

- 1978 DNQ
- 1979 Lost quarter-final

Guelph Platers defeated Markham Waxers 4-games-to-none

- 1980 DNQ
- 1981 Lost quarter-final

Belleville Bulls defeated Markham Waxers 4-games-to-1

- 1982 Lost final

Markham Waxers defeated Aurora Tigers 4-games-to-1
Markham Waxers defeated Dixie Beehives 4-games-to-2
Guelph Platers defeated Markham Waxers 4-games-to-1

- 1983 Lost quarter-final

Orillia Travelways defeated Markham Waxers 4-games-to-3

- 1984 Lost quarter-final

Orillia Travelways defeated Markham Waxers 4-games-to-none

- 1985 Lost semi-final

Markham Waxers defeated Dixie Beehives 4-games-to-1
Orillia Travelways defeated Markham Waxers 4-games-to-none

- 1986 Lost final

Markham Waxers defeated Owen Sound Greys 4-games-to-1
Orillia Travelways defeated Markham Waxers 4-games-to-1

- 1987 Lost semi-final

Owen Sound Greys defeated Markham Waxers 4-games-to-1

OJHL Years I

- 1994 Lost Preliminary

Cobourg Cougars defeated Markham Waxers 4-games-to-2

- 1995 Lost Preliminary

Lindsay Muskies defeated Markham Waxers 4-games-to-none

MetJHL Years

- 1996 Lost quarter-final

Thornhill Islanders defeated Markham Waxers 4-games-to-1

- 1997 Lost Preliminary

Thornhill Islanders defeated Markham Waxers 4-games-to-3

- 1998 Lost Preliminary

Durham Huskies defeated Markham Waxers 3-games-to-1

OJHL Years II

- 1999 Lost Division Quarter-final

Aurora Tigers defeated Markham Waxers 3-games-to-1

- 2000 Lost Division Semi-final

Markham Waxers defeated North York Rangers 4-games-to-3
Vaughan Vipers defeated Markham Waxers 4-games-to-1

- 2001 Lost Division Semi-final

Markham Waxers defeated Oshawa Legionaires 4-games-to-none
Wexford Raiders defeated Markham Waxers 4-games-to-3

- 2002 Lost Division Semi-final

Markham Waxers defeated North York Rangers 4-games-to-3
St. Michael's Buzzers defeated Markham Waxers 4-games-to-none

- 2003 Lost Conference Final

Markham Waxers defeated Thornhill Rattlers 4-games-to-none
Markham Waxers defeated St. Michael's Buzzers 4-games-to-2
Markham Waxers defeated Wexford Raiders 4-games-to-3
Wellington Dukes defeated Markham Waxers 4-games-to-none

- 2004 Lost Division Semi-final

Markham Waxers defeated Couchiching Terriers 4-games-to-none
St. Michael's Buzzers defeated Markham Waxers 4-games-to-none

- 2005 Lost Division Semi-final

Markham Waxers defeated Pickering Panthers 4-games-to-2
Wexford Raiders defeated Markham Waxers 4-games-to-1

- 2006 Lost Division Final

Markham Waxers defeated Toronto Thunderbirds 4-games-to-1
Markham Waxers defeated Pickering Panthers 4-games-to-none
St. Michael's Buzzers defeated Markham Waxers 4-games-to-none

- 2007 Lost Division Semi-final

Markham Waxers defeated Durham Fury 4-games-to-none
St. Michael's Buzzers defeated Markham Waxers 4-games-to-3

- 2008 Lost final

Markham Waxers defeated Toronto Dixie Beehives 3-games-to-none
Markham Waxers defeated Vaughan Vipers 4-games-to-none
Markham Waxers defeated St. Michael's Buzzers 4-games-to-2
Markham Waxers defeated Wellington Dukes 4-games-to-1
Oakville Blades defeated Markham Waxers 4-games-to-1

- 2009 Lost Division Semi-final

Markham Waxers defeated Cobourg Cougars 4-games-to-3
Toronto Jr. Canadiens defeated Markham Waxers 4-games-to-3

- 2010 Lost CCHL Quarter-final

Markham Waxers defeated Lindsay Muskies 4-games-to-2
Wellington Dukes defeated Markham Waxers 4-games-to-3

- 2011 Lost Round of 16

Stouffville Spirit defeated Markham Waxers 4-games-to-2

- 2012 Lost Division Semi-final

Markham Waxers defeated Huntsville Otters 3-games-to-none
Newmarket Hurricanes defeated Markham Waxers 4-games-to-2
