= Cobourg Cougars =

- City: Cobourg, Ontario, Canada
- League: Ontario Junior Hockey League
- Division: East Division
- Founded: 1964
- Home arena: Cobourg community centre
- Colours: Green, khaki, black, white
- General manager: Ryan Ramsay
- Head coach: Derek Smith
- Affiliates: Kingston Frontenacs (OHL)
- Website: cobourgcougars.com

Franchise history
- 2010: Merged with Bowmanville Eagles
- 2011: Merged with Streetsville Derbys

The Cobourg Cougars are a junior ice hockey team from Cobourg, Ontario, Canada. They are a part of the East division of the Ontario Junior Hockey League, a member of the Canadian Junior Hockey League. The Cougars won the 2017 Royal Bank Cup national junior A championship.

== History ==
The Cougars spent time in the Eastern Junior "B" league and the Central Junior C Hockey League before jumping to the Central Junior "B" league in 1992. The team graduated to Junior "A" when the league became the OPJHL the next season.

In the summer of 2010, the Cobourg Cougars absorbed the Bowmanville Eagles. This move eliminated their local competition for players and local fan base. In March 2011, the Cougars also absorbed the Streetsville Derbys. The Cougars were chosen to host the 2017 Royal Bank Cup. In May of 2023, one of their players, Trevor Hoskin was named MVP by the Canadian Junior Hockey League

== Season-by-season results ==
1965 - 2020 History - is hidden click to
Season	GP	W	L	T	OTL	GF	GA	P	Results	Playoffs
1965-66	27	4	21	2	-	95	191	12	6th EJBHL	
1966-67	Statistics Not Available									
1967-68	32	19	9	4	-	219	188	42	1st EJBHL	
1968-69	30	12	16	2	-	--	--	26	5th EJBHL	
1969-70	30	8	19	3	-	113	185	19	5th EJBHL	
1970-71	30	8	18	4	-	105	171	20	5th EJBHL	
1971-87	Statistics Not Available									
1987-88	32	9	17	6	-	159	210	24	8th COJCHL	
1988-89	40	16	21	3	-	156	194	35	9th COJCHL	
1989-90	36	11	20	5	-	147	198	27	5th COJCHL	
1990-91	36	11	24	1	-	139	190	23	7th COJCHL	
1991-92	34	20	12	1	1	217	207	42	4th COJCHL	
1992-93	48	8	37	3	-	183	341	23	14th CJBHL	
1993-94	40	17	20	3	-	197	199	39	6th OPJHL-E	
1994-95	48	27	15	6	-	286	229	62	4th OPJHL-E	
1995-96	50	21	27	2	-	201	214	45	4th OPJHL-R	
1996-97	51	11	35	5	-	190	278	29	6th OPJHL-R	
1997-98	50	8	39	3	0	146	315	19	6th OPJHL-R	
1998-99	51	20	20	9	2	213	178	51	8th OPJHL-E	
1999-00	49	25	21	2	1	199	190	53	4th OPJHL-E	
2000-01	49	23	20	5	1	214	179	52	6th OPJHL-E	
2001-02	49	33	11	5	0	198	141	71	2nd OPJHL-E	
2002-03	49	27	18	3	1	187	148	58	4th OPJHL-E	
2003-04	49	24	19	4	2	183	190	54	3rd OPJHL-E	
2004-05	49	30	14	2	3	196	131	65	4th OPJHL-E	
2005-06	49	6	40	3	0	114	297	15	10th OPJHL-E	DNQ
2006-07	49	15	29	4	1	165	225	35	9th OPJHL-E	Lost Conf. QF
2007-08	49	12	36	-	1	142	238	25	8th OPJHL-E	
2008-09	53	17	27	-	9	199	238	43	7th OJHL-C	
2009-10	50	18	25	-	7	195	198	43	9th CCHL-E	DNQ
2010-11	50	29	17	-	4	214	158	62	4th OJHL-E	Lost Round of 16
2011-12	49	37	9	-	3	232	158	77	2nd OJHL-E	Lost Division SF
2012-13	55	18	25	-	6	171	181	54	5th OJHL-E	Lost Conf. SF
2013-14	53	34	13	-	6	170	136	74	3rd OJHL-E	Lost Conf. SF
2014-15	54	36	13	1	4	188	130	77	2nd of 5 East Div; 3rd of 10 NE Conf; 4th of 22 OJHL	Won Conf. Quarters 4–0 (Fury); Lost Conf. Semis 2-4 (Golden Hawks)
2015-16	54	27	21	0	6	177	158	60	4th of 5 East Div; 6th of 11 NE Conf; 12th of 22 OJHL	Lost Conf. Quarters 0–4 (Voyageurs)
2016-17	54	39	11	0	4	240	126	82	2nd of 5 East Div; 2nd of 11 NE Conf; 4th of 22 OJHL	Won Conf. Quarters 4–0 (Voyageurs); Won Conf. Semifinal 4–1 (Dukes); Lost Conf. Finals 0–4 (Golden Hawks); 2017 Royal Bank Cup Hosts & Champions
2017-18	54	29	20	2	3	180	163	63	3rd of 5 East Div; 5th of 11 NE Conf; 17th of 22 OJHL	Won Conf. Quarters 4–1 (Voyageurs); Lost Conf. Semi's 1-4 (Tigers)
2018-19	54	35	12	1	6	189	135	77	1st of 6 East Div; 2nd of 11 SE Conf; 3rd of 22 OJHL	lost Conf. Quarters 1-4 (Dukes)
2019-20	54	20	25	2	2	157	166	44	4th of 6 East Div; 8th of 11 SE Conf; 17th of 22 OJHL	lost Conf. Quarters 1-4 (Dukes)

2020 - current History
2020-21	Season Lost to Covid-19 pandemic									
2021-22	54	28	19	1	6	200	184	63	4th of 5 East Div; 7th of 11 SE Conf; 10 of 21 OJHL	Won Conf. Quarters 2-0 (Dukes); Won Conf Semifinals 2-0 (Huskies); Lost Conf Finals 1-3 (Toronto Jr. Canadiens)
2022-23	54	32	16	1	5	199	171	70	7th of 11 SE Conf; 10 of 21 OJHL	lost Conf. Quarters 1-4 (Golden Hawks)
2023-24	56	31	18	3	4	224	165	69	5th of 12 East Conf; 8 of 24 OJHL	Won Conf. Quarters 4-1 (Huskies); Won Conf Semifinals 4-3 (St. Michael's Buzzers); Lost Conf Finals 2-4 (Golden Hawks)
2024-25	56	26	22	2	6	178	176	60	7th of 12 East Conf; 13th of 24 OJHL	Lost Conf. Quarters 1-4 (Toronto Jr. Canadiens)
2025-26	56	9	45	0	2	143	334	20	11th of 12 East Conf; 22nd of 24 OJHL	Did not qualify

== Royal Bank Cup ==
CANADIAN NATIONAL CHAMPIONSHIPS
Dudley Hewitt Champions - Central, Fred Page Champions - Eastern, Western Canada Cup Champions - Western & Runner Up, and Host
Round robin play with top 4 in semi-final and winners to finals.

Year	Round Robin	Record W-OTW-OTL-L	Standing	Semifinal	Gold Medal Game
2017; HOST	OTW, Trenton Golden Hawks 3-2; OTL, Penticton Vees 2-3; W, Terrebonne Cobras 6-1; W, Brooks Bandits 5-2	2-1-1-0	1st of 5	W, Penticton Vees 3-1	OTW, Brooks Bandits 3-2; NATIONAL CHAMPIONS

== Clarence Schmalz Cup appearances ==
1972: Leamington Flyers defeated Cobourg Cougars 4-games-to-1
1974: Cobourg Cougars defeated Simcoe Jets 4-games-to-1

== Notable alumni ==
- Dennis O'Brien
- Justin Williams
- Randy Jones
- Mason Marchment
- Justin Danforth
- Riley Stillman
- Nick Weiss
- Owen Beck
- Jesse English

Preceded by West Kelowna Warriors	Royal Bank Cup Champions; 2017	Succeeded by Chilliwack Chiefs
