= Caledon Admirals =

- City: Caledon, Ontario, Canada
- League: Ontario Junior Hockey League
- Founded: 1980
- Home arena: Mayfield Recreation Centre
- Colours: Maroon, gold, black
- Owner: David M. Arsenault
- General manager: Ken Jeysman
- Head coach: Brandon Villamere
- Affiliates: Caledon Bombers (GOJHL); Caledon Golden Hawks (PJHL)

Franchise history
- 1980–1991: Henry Carr Crusaders
- 1991–1993: Weston Dukes
- 1993–1997: Thornhill Islanders
- 1997–2004: Thornhill Rattlers
- 2004–2005: Thornhill Thunderbirds
- 2005–2006: Toronto Thunderbirds
- 2007–2011: Villanova Knights
- 2011–2018: Orangeville Flyers
- 2018–2021: Brampton Admirals
- 2021–present: Caledon Admirals

Current uniform

The Caledon Admirals are a Junior 'A' ice hockey team based in Caledon, Ontario, Canada. They are a part of the Ontario Junior Hockey League.

== History ==
=== Henry Carr ===
The Admirals lineage traces back to the Henry Carr Crusaders. Like the Toronto St. Michael's Majors and St. Michael's Buzzers, the Crusaders were a secondary school based junior hockey team. The team's affiliation was with the Father Henry Carr Secondary School of the Toronto Catholic District School Board. In 1980, they took their high school team and joined the Metro Junior "B" Hockey League, where they played until 1991, even after the league left the Ontario Hockey Association in 1989. The team was famous for its first undefeated Metro season in 1983 (34–0–2), when they won the All-Ontario Jr. B Championship, the Sutherland Cup. After five rounds of playoffs competing for the Sutherland Cup, the Crusaders accumulated 54 wins, 2 losses, 2 ties, and 2 losses in overtime in 60 regulation games.

In 1991, when the Metro league declared itself Junior "A" and they transferred the franchise to the Weston Dukes. Henry Carr used to field a team at the high school hockey level as well.

=== Thornhill ===
In 1993, the Weston Dukes organization folded and their franchise was moved to Thornhill and became the Thornhill Islanders. In 1997, they were renamed the Thornhill Rattlers until 2004, when they assumed the Thunderbirds name.

After playing in multiple league over many years, even competing for the 2001 Royal Bank Cup. In summer 2006, the players of the team started to get let go or traded for cash to any interested team. The team was for sale for the better part of six months, but with no serious offers.

=== Villanova Knights ===
In 2007, local businessman David Arsenault (governor and owner) along with St. Thomas of Villanova College revived the team bringing it back into the OPJHL under the Villanova College name.

The Villanova Knights were announced officially on May 15, 2007. The team played their home games at York University's Canlan Ice Gardens.

=== Orangeville Jr. Flyers ===
The original Orangeville Flyers were disbanded by the league in spring 2011. On April 14, 2011, ten days after the Flyers folded, the OJHL and the Villanova Knights announced that they were moving to Orangeville under the name Orangeville Flyers.

=== Brampton Admirals ===
On June 18, 2018, team president David Arsenault, citing poor local support in Orangeville and an improved development model by having both his junior "A" and Junior "B" teams playing in the same arena, relocated and rebranded the Orangeville Flyers as the Brampton Admirals. In 2021 the team relocated to Caledon, Ontario and were renamed the Caledon Admirals. They currently play out of the Mayfield Recreation Centre.

== Season-by-season standings ==
Season	GP	W	L	T	OTL	GF	GA	Pts	Results	Playoffs
Henry Carr Crusaders
1980–81	42	18	19	5	-	211	208	41	8th Metro B	
1981–82	36	24	8	4	-	209	136	52	1st Metro B	
1982–83	36	34	0	2	-	264	113	70	1st Metro B	Won League, won SC
1983–84	42	26	10	6	-	280	207	58	1st Metro B	Won League
1984–85	36	25	7	4	-	184	126	54	1st Metro B	
1985–86	37	22	10	5	-	229	164	49	4th Metro B	Lost semi-final
1986–87	37	28	4	5	-	256	162	61	1st Metro B	Won League
1987–88	37	23	9	5	-	214	161	51	3rd Metro B	Lost semi-final
1988–89	39	16	18	5	-	184	180	37	7th Metro B	
1989–90	44	27	9	8	-	237	137	62	2nd Metro B	
1990–91	44	20	16	8	-	232	193	48	6th Metro B	
Weston Dukes
1991–92	44	15	26	3	-	207	230	33	9th Metro A	
1992–93	48	15	27	6	-	203	253	36	11th Metro A	
Thornhill Islanders
1993–94	50	30	18	2	-	253	206	62	4th Metro A	Lost semi-final
1994–95	50	35	14	1	-	244	151	71	2nd Metro A	
Thornhill Rattlers
1995–96	52	34	15	3	-	251	172	71	3rd Metro A	Lost final
1996–97	50	29	17	4	-	279	195	62	6th Metro A	
1997–98	50	29	18	3	-	216	172	61	5th Metro A	
1998–99	51	23	24	3	1	230	213	50	7th OPJHL-C	
1999-00	49	33	9	4	3	264	170	73	2nd OPJHL-S	
2000–01	49	36	8	3	2	231	148	77	1st OPJHL-S	Won League, won DHC
2001–02	49	20	21	6	2	165	183	48	4th OPJHL-S	
2002–03	49	11	34	3	1	129	240	26	9th OPJHL-S	
2003–04	49	18	26	4	1	184	219	41	6th OPJHL-S	
Thornhill Thunderbirds
2004–05	49	16	30	1	2	143	207	35	7th OPJHL-S	
2005–06	49	23	23	3	0	203	203	49	7th OPJHL-S	Lost Conf. QF
2006–07	Did Not Participate									
Villanova Knights
2007–08	49	6	42	-	1	124	311	13	9th OPJHL-N	
2008–09	49	6	39	-	4	119	259	16	10th OJHL-P	
2009–10	56	33	19	-	4	233	211	70	6th OJAHL	Lost quarter-final
2010–11	50	30	17	-	3	219	175	63	2nd OJHL-S	Lost quarter-final
Orangeville Flyers
2011–12	49	19	29	-	1	155	206	39	6th OJHL-N	Lost Division QF
2012–13	55	18	34	-	3	184	262	39	5th OJHL-W	DNQ
2013–14	53	4	46	-	3	122	272	11	6th OJHL-W	DNQ
2014–15	-	-	-	-	-	-	-	-	-	-
2015–16	54	23	24	2	5	182	185	53	4th of 5 West Div; 8th of 11 SW Conf; 17th of 22 OJHL	Lost Conf. Quarters 1–4 (Raiders)
2016–17	54	17	33	1	3	181	235	38	4th of 5 West Div; 9th of 11 SW Conf; 17th of 22 OJHL	Did not qualify
2017–18	54	22	25	1	6	165	184	51	3rd of 5 West Div; 8th of 11 SW Conf; 16th of 22 OJHL	Lost Conf. Quarters 0–4 (Patriots)
Brampton Admirals
2018–19	54	24	22	2	6	185	185	56	4th of 6 West Div; 6th of 11 NW Conf; 14th of 22 OJHL	Lost Conf. Quarters 1–4 (Blades)
2019–20	54	28	24	0	1	191	180	57	5th of 6 West Div; 8th of 11 NW Conf; 13th of 22 OJHL	DNQ
2020-21	Season cancelled due to COVID-19									
Caledon Admirals
2021–22	54	7	46	0	1	113	302	15	6th of 6 South Div; 11th of 11 SE Conf; 21st of 21 OJHL	DNQ
2022–23	54	9	40	1	4	113	302	23	10th of 11 SE Conf; 19th of 21 OJHL	DNQ
2023–24	56	10	40	1	6	122	259	26	11th of 12 West Conf; 22nd of 24 OJHL	DNQ
2024–25	56	11	43	2	0	132	287	24	12th of 12 West Conf; 23rd of 24 OJHL	DNQ

=== Playoffs ===
MetJHL Years

- 1990 Lost semi-final

Henry Carr Crusaders defeated Mimico Monarchs 4-games-to-none
Thornhill Thunderbirds defeated Henry Carr Crusaders 4-games-to-2

- 1991 Lost semi-final

Henry Carr Crusaders defeated St. Michael's Buzzers 4-games-to-none
Bramalea Blues defeated Henry Carr Crusaders 4-games-to-2

- 1992 Lost Preliminary

St. Michael's Buzzers defeated Weston Dodgers 3-games-to-none

- 1993 DNQ
- 1994 Lost semi-final

Thornhill Islanders defeated Wellington Dukes 4-games-to-1
Wexford Raiders defeated Thornhill Islanders 4-games-to-none

- 1995 Lost semi-final

Thornhill Islanders defeated Kingston Voyageurs 4-games-to-none
Wexford Raiders defeated Thornhill Islanders 4-games-to-3

- 1996 Lost final

Thornhill Islanders defeated Markham Waxers 4-games-to-1
Thornhill Islanders defeated Wexford Raiders 4-games-to-2
Caledon Canadians defeated Thornhill Islanders 4-games-to-3

- 1997 Lost Round Robin Quarter-final

Thornhill Islanders defeated Markham Waxers 4-games-to-3
Fifth in round robin quarter-final (2–4)

- 1998 Lost quarter-final

Thornhill Rattlers defeated Huntsville Wildcats 3-games-to-1
Syracuse Jr. Crunch defeated Thornhill Rattlers 3-games-to-1

OJHL Years

- 1999 Lost Division Quarter-final

Couchiching Terriers defeated Thornhill Rattlers 3-games-to-2

- 2000 Lost Conference Final

Thornhill Rattlers defeated Oshawa Legionaires 4-games-to-1
Thornhill Rattlers defeated Wexford Raiders 4-games-to-1
Thornhill Rattlers defeated Vaughan Vipers 4-games-to-none
Lindsay Muskies defeated Thornhill Rattlers 4-games-to-1

- 2001 Won League, won OHF Ruddock Trophy, won Dudley Hewitt Cup, lost 2001 Royal Bank Cup round robin

Thornhill Rattlers defeated Huntsville Wildcats 4-games-to-none
Thornhill Rattlers defeated St. Michael's Buzzers 4-games-to-none
Thornhill Rattlers defeated Wexford Raiders 4-games-to-2
Thornhill Rattlers defeated Trenton Sting 4-games-to-1
Thornhill Rattlers defeated Couchiching Terriers 4-games-to-1 OPJHL CHAMPIONS
Thornhill Rattlers defeated Rayside-Balfour Sabrecats (NOJHL) 4-games-to-3 RUDDOCK TROPHY, DUDLEY HEWITT CUP CHAMPIONS
Fifth and eliminated in 2001 Royal Bank Cup round robin (0–4)

- 2002 Lost Division Quarter-final

Pickering Panthers defeated Thornhill Rattlers 4-games-to-3

- 2003 Lost Division Quarter-final

Markham Waxers defeated Thornhill Rattlers 4-games-to-none

- 2004 Lost Division Quarter-final

Stouffville Spirit defeated Thornhill Rattlers 4-games-to-2

- 2005 Lost Division Quarter-final

St. Michael's Buzzers defeated Thornhill Thunderbirds 4-games-to-none

- 2006 Lost Division Quarter-final

Markham Waxers defeated Toronto Thunderbirds 4-games-to-1

- 2007 Did Not Participate
- 2008 DNQ
- 2009 DNQ
- 2010 Lost OJAHL Quarter-final

Georgetown Raiders defeated Villanova Knights 4-games-to-2

- 2011 Lost quarter-final

Villanova Knights defeated Peterborough Stars 4-games-to-1
Wellington Dukes defeated Villanova Knights 4-games-to-1

- 2012 Lost Division Quarter-final

Aurora Tigers defeated Orangeville Flyers 3-games-to-1

== Sutherland Cup appearances ==
1983: Henry Carr Crusaders defeated Stratford Cullitons 4-games-to-none

== Notable alumni ==
- Bob Essensa
- Patrick Flatley
- Manny Legace
- Matt Lorito
- Steve Moore
- Dominic Moore
- Jeff O'Neill
- Raffi Torres
- Mike York
- Evan Fong
