= Georgetown Raiders =

- City: Georgetown, Ontario, Canada
- League: Ontario Junior Hockey League
- Founded: 1975
- Home arena: Mold-Masters SportsPlex Park
- Colours: Black, red, white
- Affiliates: Kitchener Rangers

Franchise history
- 1975-1988: Georgetown Gemini
- 1988-Present: Georgetown Raiders

The Georgetown Raiders are a Junior "A" ice hockey team from Georgetown, Ontario, Canada. They are a part of the Ontario Junior A Hockey League. The team began play in the Central Ontario Jr. B league and was known as the "Georgetown Gemini" until 1988. The Raiders won the 2005 Dudley Hewitt Cup.

== History ==
The Georgetown Gemini were founded in 1975 as members of the Central Junior B Hockey League. They were the first junior club in Georgetown since the Jr. C Raiders folded in 1969.

The name "Georgetown Raiders" used to belong to a different team that competed in OHA Senior A and Intermediate A ranks in the 1970s and 1980s. The two clubs are not known to be connected.

The Raiders won the 2006 OPJHL Showcase Tournament in Newmarket, Ontario. On its way to winning the tournament, the team won its quarter-final game against the Eastern Junior Hockey League's Tier III Junior "A" Capital District Selects in double overtime by a score of 6-5. The Raiders then won their semi-final game against the New York Bobcats by a score of 5-4 in triple overtime. The team completed the tournament by defeating the host team, the Newmarket Hurricanes, by a score of 7–5.

== Season-by-season record ==
Note: GP = Games Played, W = Wins, L = Losses, T = Ties, OTL = Overtime Losses, GF = Goals for, GA = Goals against

| Season | GP | W | L | T | OTL | GF | GA | Points | Finish | Playoffs |
| 1975-76 | 36 | 19 | 14 | 3 | - | 187 | 168 | 41 | 3rd CJBHL | |
| 1976-77 | 42 | 19 | 20 | 3 | - | 202 | 206 | 41 | 5th CJBHL | |
| 1977-78 | 42 | 11 | 23 | 8 | - | -- | -- | 30 | 6th CJBHL | |
| 1978-79 | 43 | 5 | 36 | 2 | - | 149 | 309 | 12 | 12th CJBHL | |
| 1979-80 | 44 | 16 | 20 | 8 | - | 206 | 239 | 40 | 7th CJBHL | -- |
| 1980-81 | 44 | 11 | 26 | 7 | - | 156 | 239 | 29 | 10th CJBHL | -- |
| 1981-82 | 40 | 7 | 28 | 5 | - | 153 | 282 | 19 | 9th CJBHL | -- |
| 1982-83 | 42 | 10 | 26 | 5 | - | 161 | 232 | 26 | 7th CJBHL | -- |
| 1983-84 | 40 | 18 | 20 | 2 | - | 177 | 178 | 38 | 4th CJBHL | -- |
| 1984-85 | 40 | 10 | 25 | 5 | - | 168 | 231 | 25 | 8th CJBHL | -- |
| 1985-86 | 48 | 14 | 26 | 8 | - | 228 | 270 | 36 | 7th CJBHL | -- |
| 1986-87 | 42 | 19 | 17 | 6 | - | 186 | 184 | 44 | 4th CJBHL | -- |
| 1987-88 | 44 | 9 | 32 | 3 | - | 224 | 323 | 21 | 12th CJBHL | -- |
| 1988-89 | 42 | 17 | 15 | 10 | - | 221 | 214 | 44 | 7th CJBHL | -- |
| 1989-90 | 42 | 6 | 33 | 3 | - | 147 | 281 | 15 | 14th CJBHL | -- |
| 1990-91 | 42 | 12 | 29 | 1 | - | 162 | 260 | 25 | 12th CJBHL | -- |
| 1991-92 | 42 | 20 | 15 | 7 | - | 218 | 177 | 47 | 8th CJBHL | -- |
| 1992-93 | 49 | 10 | 38 | 1 | - | 190 | 317 | 22 | 16th CJBHL | -- |
| 1993-94 | 42 | 8 | 34 | 0 | - | 170 | 265 | 17 | 7th OPJHL-W | -- |
| 1994-95 | 49 | 3 | 44 | 2 | - | 166 | 345 | 8 | 8th OPJHL-W | -- |
| 1995-96 | 50 | 6 | 41 | 3 | - | 165 | 357 | 19 | 5th OPJHL-Mi | -- |
| 1996-97 | 51 | 3 | 47 | 1 | - | 140 | 375 | 10 | 5th OPJHL-Mi | -- |
| 1997-98 | 51 | 6 | 44 | 1 | - | 134 | 330 | 13 | 5th OPJHL-Mi | -- |
| 1998-99 | 51 | 27 | 18 | 4 | 2 | 264 | 239 | 60 | 5th OPJHL-W | -- |
| 1999-00 | 49 | 32 | 10 | 5 | 2 | 238 | 180 | 71 | 1st OPJHL-W | -- |
| 2000-01 | 49 | 28 | 17 | 2 | 2 | 229 | 182 | 60 | 2nd OPJHL-W | -- |
| 2001-02 | 49 | 23 | 20 | 5 | 1 | 216 | 201 | 52 | 6th OPJHL-W | -- |
| 2002-03 | 49 | 37 | 7 | 3 | 2 | 280 | 155 | 79 | 2nd OPJHL-W | -- |
| 2003-04 | 49 | 40 | 5 | 3 | 1 | 296 | 132 | 84 | 1st OPJHL-W | -- |
| 2004-05 | 49 | 41 | 7 | 0 | 1 | 282 | 120 | 83 | 1st OPJHL-W | Lost final, won DHC as host |
| 2005-06 | 49 | 27 | 16 | 4 | 2 | 188 | 132 | 60 | 3rd OPJHL-W | Lost W. Conference Semi |
| 2006-07 | 49 | 31 | 12 | 3 | 3 | 250 | 180 | 68 | 4th OPJHL-W | Lost Conf. Finals |
| 2007-08 | 49 | 30 | 14 | - | 5 | 202 | 164 | 65 | 2nd OPJHL-W | |
| 2008-09 | 49 | 42 | 6 | - | 1 | 263 | 140 | 85 | 1st OJHL-M | |
| 2009-10 | 56 | 41 | 10 | - | 5 | 269 | 144 | 87 | 3rd OJAHL | Lost semi-final |
| 2010-11 | 50 | 32 | 15 | - | 3 | 244 | 169 | 67 | 3rd OJHL-W | Lost Round of 16 |
| 2011-12 | 49 | 39 | 9 | - | 1 | 224 | 109 | 79 | 1st OJHL-W | Lost Conf. Final |
| 2012-13 | 55 | 38 | 13 | - | 4 | 224 | 140 | 80 | 2nd OJHL-W | Lost Conf. Semi-final |
| 2013-14 | 53 | 31 | 20 | - | 2 | 196 | 160 | 64 | 2nd OJHL-W | Lost Conf. Final |
| 2014-15 | 54 | 37 | 9 | 3 | 5 | 204 | 126 | 84 | 1st of 5 West Div; 1st of 11 SW Conf; 3rd of 22 OJHL | Won Conf. Quarterfinals 4-3 (Jr. Sabres); Lost Conf. Semifinals 0-4 (Jr. Canadiens) |
| 2015-16 | 54 | 37 | 13 | 3 | 1 | 210 | 129 | 78 | 1st of 5 West Div; 1st of 11 SW Conf; 2nd of 22 OJHL | Won Conf. Quarters 4-1 (Flyers); Won Conf. Semifinals 4-2 (Rangers); Won Conf. Finals 4-2 (Cougars); Lost OJHL Championship, 1-4 (Golden Hawks) |
| 2016-17 | 54 | 45 | 5 | 2 | 2 | 258 | 183 | 94 | 1st of 5 West Div; 1st of 11 SW Conf; 1st of 22 OJHL | Won Conf. Quarters 4-1 (Cougars); Won Conf. Semis 4-0 (Jr. Canadiens); Won Conf. Finals, 4-2 (Blades); Won OJHL Finals 4-3 (Golden Hawks); OJHL Champions |
| 2017-18 | 54 | 36 | 12 | 3 | 3 | 200 | 110 | 78 | 1st of 5 West Div; 4th of 11 SW Conf; 4th of 22 OJHL | Won Conf. Quarters 4-0 (Buzzers); Won Conf. Semifinal 4-3 (Rangers); Won Conf. Finals 4-3 (Patriots); Lost OJHL Finals 2-4 (Dukes) |
| 2018-19 | 55 | 24 | 24 | 3 | 4 | 158 | 155 | 55 | 5th of 6 West Div; 8th of 11 SW Conf; 16th of 22 OJHL | Lost Conf. Quarters 2-4 (Waxers) |
| 2019-20 | 55 | 25 | 21 | 4 | 5 | 145 | 147 | 59 | 4th of 6 West Div; 7th of 11 NW Conf; 12th of 22 OJHL | Lost Conf. Quarters 0-4 (Panthers) |
| 2020–21 | Season lost due to Covid-19 | | | | | | | | | |
| 2021-22 | 54 | 27 | 20 | 3 | 4 | 170 | 164 | 61 | 3rd of 5 West Div; 5th of 10 NW Conf; 12th of 21 OJHL | Lost Conf. Quarters 2-4 (Menace) |
| 2022-23 | 54 | 39 | 10 | 2 | 3 | 252 | 159 | 83 | 2nd of 10 NW Conf; 3rd of 21 OJHL | Won Conf. Quarters 4-0 (Tigers); Lost Conf Semifinals 0-4 (Cougars) |
| 2023-24 | 56 | 30 | 21 | 1 | 4 | 209 | 181 | 65 | 6th of 12 West Conf; 13th of 24 OJHL | Lost Conf. Quarters 0-4 (Flyers) |
| 2024-25 | 56 | 19 | 31 | 2 | 4 | 157 | 221 | 44 | 9th of 12 West Conf; 18th of 24 OJHL | Did Not Qualify |
| 2025-26 | 56 | 6 | 48 | 0 | 2 | 115 | 312 | 14 | 12th of 12 West Conf; 24th of 24 OJHL | Did Not Qualify |

== Dudley Hewitt Cup ==
Central Canada Championships
NOJHL - OJHL - SIJHL - Host
Round robin play with 2nd vs 3rd in semi-final to advance against 1st in the finals.

| Year | Round Robin | Record | Standing | Semifinal | Gold Medal Game |
|---|---|---|---|---|---|
| 2005; HOST | W, North Bay Skyhawks 7-2; W, Fort William North Stars 4-0; W, St. Michael's Buzzers 5-4 | 3-0-0 | 1st of 4 | bye to finals | W, St. Michael's Buzzers 3-1; Dudley Hewitt Cup Champions |
| 2017 | OTL, Dryden Ice Dogs 4-5; SOW, Trenton Golden Hawks 1-0; W, Powassan Voodoos 5-2 | 2-0-1 | 2nd of 4 | W, Powassan Voodoos 2-1 | L, Trenton Golden Hawks 1-2 |

== Royal Bank Cup ==
CANADIAN NATIONAL CHAMPIONSHIPS
Dudley Hewitt Champions - Central, Fred Page Champions - Eastern, Western Canada Cup Champions - Western & Runner-up, and Host
Round robin play with top 4 in semi-final and winners to finals.

| Year | Round Robin | Record W-OTW-OTL-L | Standing | Semifinal | Gold Medal Game |
|---|---|---|---|---|---|
| 2005 | L, Weyburn Red Wings 4-3; W, Hawkesbury Hawks 3-0; W, Portage Terriers 6-3; L, Camrose Kodiaks 1-2 | 2-2-0 | 3rd of 5 | L, Camrose Kodiaks 2-8 | n/a |

== Notable alumni ==
- Jett Alexander
- Krys Barch
- Kevin J. Brown
- Stanislav Chistov
- Jack Hughes
- Andrew Peters
- Evan Rodrigues
- Jeff Shevalier
- Joey Tenute
- Art Webster
- Mike Wilson
- Scott Wilson
