= Haliburton County Huskies =

- City: Haliburton, Ontario, Canada
- League: Ontario Junior Hockey League
- Division: East Division
- Founded: 1965
- Home arena: SG Nesbitt Memorial Arena
- Colours: Navy, Grey, Black, White
- Owner: Paul Wilson
- General manager: Ryan Ramsay
- Head coach: Ryan Ramsay
- Affiliates: Port Perry Lumberjacks (PJHL); Oshawa Generals (OHL)

Franchise history
- 1965–1972: Oshawa Crushmen
- 1972–2006: Oshawa Legionaires
- 2006–2008: Durham Fury
- 2008–2021: Whitby Fury
- 2021–Present: Haliburton County Huskies

The Haliburton County Huskies are a Junior "A" ice hockey team from Haliburton, Ontario, Canada. They are a part of the Ontario Junior Hockey League.

== History ==
This franchise was founded in 1965 as the Oshawa Crushmen, and were initially a member of the Eastern Junior B Hockey League. In 1972, the Crushmen jumped to the Metro Junior B Hockey League and were renamed the Legionaires.

In the late 1970s, the Legionaires were coached by future National Hockey League coach "Iron" Mike Keenan. Keenan's star player during this time was a young Dale Hawerchuk.

At the end of the 2005–06 season, the Oshawa Legionaires were bought out by NHLers Keith Primeau, Wayne Primeau, as well as business man Peter Tosh. Keith had recently retired due to injury and created his own equipment line known as "Fury", based out of Oshawa. In turn, the Primeaus bought the local team and named them to reflect the name of his company.

In 2008, the Fury relocated to Whitby, Ontario, where they played out of the Iroquois Park Sports Centre.

In 2021, the Fury again relocated to Minden, Ontario in Haliburton County, where they play out of S.G Nesbitt Memorial Arena as the Haliburton County Huskies.

== Staff ==
- President: Paul Wilson
- Director of Hockey Operations: Brad Townsend
- General manager / Head Coach: Ryan Ramsay
- Assistant general manager / Assistant Coach: Brain MacKenzie

== Season-by-season results ==
1950 - 2021 History (Oshawa_Durham_Whitby) is hidden click to
Season	GP	W	L	T	OTL	GF	GA	P	Results	Playoffs
Oshawa Crushmen
1965–66	33	19	12	2	-	177	112	40	2nd EJBHL	Won League
1966–67	Statistics not available									
1967–68	31	19	11	1	-	202	150	39	3rd EJBHL	Won League
1968–69	30	20	8	2	-	--	--	42	1st EJBHL	Won League
1969–70	30	20	7	3	-	194	106	43	1st EJBHL	
1970–71	30	21	7	2	-	177	105	44	2nd EJBHL	
1971–72	Statistics not available									
Oshawa Legionaires
1972–73	34	17	13	4	-	148	139	38	4th Metro B	
1973–74	44	19	23	2	-	219	239	40	8th Metro B	
1974–75	38	4	30	4	-	138	190	12	13th Metro B	
1975–76	34	22	5	7	-	208	135	51	1st Metro B	
1976–77	34	17	10	7	-	179	147	41	2nd Metro B	
1977–78	36	27	4	5	-	233	133	59	1st Metro B	
1978–79	44	34	6	4	-	311	165	72	1st Metro B	
1979–80	42	18	20	4	-	197	219	40	9th Metro B	
1980–81	42	25	12	5	-	254	153	55	2nd Metro B	
1981–82	36	18	15	3	-	169	153	39	5th Metro B	
1982–83	36	16	16	4	-	137	126	36	5th Metro B	
1983–84	42	24	14	4	-	183	145	52	3rd Metro B	
1984–85	36	25	9	2	-	193	133	54	2nd Metro B	
1985–86	37	16	17	4	-	222	204	36	7th Metro B	Lost quarter-final
1986–87	37	20	15	2	-	209	167	42	5th Metro B	Lost quarter-final
1987–88	37	11	20	6	-	147	182	28	10th Metro B	DNQ
1988–89	40	17	15	8	-	183	175	42	5th Metro B	
1989–90	44	20	13	11	-	248	177	51	7th Metro B	
1990–91	44	30	8	6	-	262	151	66	2nd Metro B	
1991–92	44	10	32	2	-	158	252	22	11th Metro A	
1992–93	48	16	29	3	-	196	237	35	12th Metro A	
1993–94	50	25	24	1	-	244	237	51	8th Metro A	DNQ
1994–95	49	18	30	1	-	199	240	37	11th Metro A	
1995–96	52	13	38	1	-	184	286	27	11th Metro A	DNQ
1996–97	50	20	30	0	-	231	292	40	10th Metro A	
1997–98	50	34	15	1	-	266	183	69	3rd Metro A	
1998–99	51	26	20	3	2	221	214	57	5th OPJHL-E	
1999-00	49	13	29	4	3	157	212	33	8th OPJHL-S	
2000–01	49	23	22	2	2	176	181	50	5th OPJHL-S	
2001–02	49	14	25	7	3	158	226	38	8th OPJHL-S	
2002–03	49	24	21	3	1	189	184	52	6th OPJHL-S	
2003–04	49	24	21	4	0	164	214	52	5th OPJHL-S	
2004–05	49	8	37	1	3	111	264	20	8th OPJHL-S	
2005–06	49	9	35	4	1	144	241	23	8th OPJHL-S	Lost Conf. QF
Durham Fury
2006–07	49	16	31	2	0	131	207	34	6th OPJHL-S	Lost Conf. QF
2007–08	49	13	31	-	5	171	267	31	7th OPJHL-S	
Whitby Fury
2008–09	49	16	30	-	3	181	250	35	7th OJHL-R	
2009–10	50	24	22	-	4	182	198	52	7th CCHL-E	Lost Preliminary
2010–11	50	22	17	-	11	170	158	55	6th OJHL-E	DNQ
2011–12	49	28	12	-	9	178	132	65	4th OJHL-E	Won Conf. Quarters 4-1 (Cougars) won Conf. Semis 4-0 (Voyageurs); Won Conf. Final 4-1 (Patriots); Lost League Finals 2-4 (Spirit)
2012–13	55	31	19	-	5	171	157	67	3rd OJHL-E	Lost Conf. Quarters 2–4 (Hurricanes)
2013–14	53	35	14	-	4	227	164	74	2nd OJHL-E	Lost Conf. Quarters 2–4 (Golden Hawks)
2014–15	54	27	21	4	2	189	172	60	4th of 5 East Div; 6th of 11 SE Conf; 10th of 22 OJHL	Lost Conf. Quarters 0–4 (Cougars)
2015–16	54	25	23	1	5	180	189	56	5th of 5 East Div; 7th of 11 SE Conf; 13th of 22 OJHL	Lost Conf. Quarters 1–4 (Royals)
2016–17	54	38	11	1	4	226	147	81	3rd of 5 East Div; 3rd of 11 SE Conf; 5th of 22 OJHL	Lost Conf. Quarters 3–4 (Dukes)
2017–18	54	18	31	4	1	139	190	41	5th of 5 East Div; 9th of 11 SE Conf; 19th of 22 OJHL	Did not qualify
2018–19	54	33	18	1	2	167	122	69	3rd of 5 East Div; 4th of 11 SE Conf; 5th of 22 OJHL	Won Conf. Quarters 4-2 (Trenton); Lost Conf. Semis 3-4 (Wellington)
2019–20	54	21	27	1	5	152	210	48	3rd of 5 East Div; 7th of 11 SE Conf; 17th of 22 OJHL	Lost Conf. Quarters 1-4 (Trenton)
2020–21	Season Lost due to COVID-19 pandemic									

2021 - current History
Haliburton County Huskies
2021–22	54	33	16	1	4	172	136	71	3rd of 5 East Div; 5th of 11 SE Conf; 8th of 21 OJHL	Won Conf. Quarters 2-1(Trenton); Lost Conf. Semis 1-2 (Coburg)
2022–23	54	36	14	1	3	229	129	76	3rd of 11 SE Conf; 6th of 21 OJHL	Won Conf. Quarters 4-1 (Toronto); Lost Conf. Semis 0-4 (Wellington)
2023–24	56	33	19	3	1	185	152	70	4th of 12 EAST Conf; 7th of 24 OJHL	Lost Conf. Quarters 1-4 (Coburg)
2024–25	56	40	15	0	1	217	152	81	3rdof 12 EAST Conf; 5th of 24 OJHL	Won Conf. Quarters 4-2 (Buzzers); Won Conf Semifinals 4-2 (Toronto Jr. Canadiens); Lost Conf Finals 1-4 (Golden Hawks)

=== Playoffs ===
MetJHL years

- 1990 – lost quarter-final

Oshawa Legionaires defeated Markham Connections 3 games to none
Wexford Raiders defeated Oshawa Legionaires 4 games to 3

- 1991 – lost semi-final

Oshawa Legionaires defeated Wellington Dukes 4 games to 2
Wexford Raiders defeated Oshawa Legionaires 4 games to 3

- 1992 – DNQ
- 1993 – DNQ
- 1994 – DNQ
- 1995 – DNQ
- 1996 – DNQ
- 1997 – lost preliminary

Pickering Panthers defeated Oshawa Legionaires 4 games to 2

- 1998 – lost semi-final

Oshawa Legionaires defeated Shelburne Wolves 3 games to none
Oshawa Legionaires defeated Wellington Dukes 3 games to 2
Wexford Raiders defeated Oshawa Legionaires 4 games to 2

== Notable alumni ==
Notable alumni of the Legionnaires, and the Fury include:

- Sean Brown
- Jeff Daniels
- Dale Hawerchuk
- John MacLean
- Rob Pearson
- Peter Sidorkiewicz
- Chris Tanev
- Jason Ward
- Nick Weiss
