= Toronto Patriots =

Junior "A" ice hockey team from Toronto, Ontario

- City: Toronto, Ontario, Canada
- League: Ontario Junior Hockey League
- Founded: 1996
- Home arena: Westwood Arena
- Colours: Black, blue, sliver, and white
- General manager: Blake Ricci
- Head coach: Vince Bellissimo

Franchise history
- 1996–1998: Quinte Hawks
- 1998–2007: Bancroft Hawks
- 2008–2009: Upper Canada HC
- 2009–2011: Upper Canada Patriots
- 2011–2014: Toronto Lakeshore Patriots
- 2014–present: Toronto Patriots

Current uniform

The Toronto Patriots are a junior "A" ice hockey team from Toronto, Ontario, Canada. They are a part of Ontario Junior Hockey League.

== History ==
=== Quinte (1996–1998) ===
In 1996, the Quinte Hawks of Deseronto, Ontario were granted expansion into the Metro Junior A Hockey League. ^{David Frost was brought in to coach the team. Frost faced criminal charges in 2008 for his conduct for his time with the team, but was acquitted. Frost brought with him Mike Jefferson and Sheldon Keefe. Although both would play in the National Hockey League, Jefferson (later changed to Danton) would become famous for a mysterious murder-for-hire plot that targeted Frost and landed him in prison.}

=== Bancroft (1998–2007) ===
In 1998, the Metro Junior A Hockey League folded and merged with the Ontario Provincial Junior A Hockey League. The Hawks moved into the OPJHL but were relocated to Bancroft, Ontario. ^{In nine seasons, the Bancroft Hawks would never celebrate a winning season.}

In 2007, due to mounting troubles with finding appropriate ownership and supporting the team financially, the Bancroft Hawks were granted a leave from the Ontario Hockey Association.

=== Upper Canada (2008–2011) ===
In the summer of 2008, a group of Toronto-based businessmen bought the rights to the Bancroft franchise, renamed the team the Upper Canada Hockey Club and moved the team to the North York district of Toronto. The club had a working relationship with Upper Canada College but was not directly affiliated. Despite owning the franchise that used to be the Hawks, no member of the UCHC was involved with the manifestations of the franchise in either Deseronto or Bancroft.

The Upper Canada Hockey Club's first game was an 8-5 loss to the Seguin Bruins on September 6, 2008. The team's first win was at home against the Villanova Knights, 5-4 on September 14, 2008. In 2009, the team changed their name to the Patriots and moved to the Etobicoke district of Toronto.

Toronto Patriots (2011–Present)

In 2011-2012, they became the Toronto Lakeshore Patriots and had their best season yet when they finished third in the South Division and made it to the Conference Final, eventually losing to the Whitby Fury. In 2014, the team dropped "Lakeshore" from its name. That season, the team won the Buckland Cup and Dudley Hewitt Cup. In 2015, the Patriots won the Buckland Cup for the second consecutive year. They advanced to the Dudley Hewitt Cup tournament but were eventually eliminated by the Fort Frances Lakers. In 2023, the Toronto Patriots were purchased by the ownership of Everest Academy, a Private Sports School in Vaughan, Ontario. Heading into the 2024 season, the Patriots underwent a major rebrand to align the colour scheme with Everest Academy and renovated its facilities at Westwood Arena in Etobicoke, Ontario.

== Season-by-season results ==
Season	GP	W	L	T	OTL	GF	GA	P	Results	Playoffs
Quinte Hawks
1996-97	50	34	13	3	-	280	143	71	5th Metro A	
1997-98	49	23	24	2	-	213	222	48	8th Metro A	
Bancroft Hawks
1998-99	51	12	37	1	1	124	224	26	13th OPJHL-E	
1999-00	49	18	25	3	3	177	221	42	7th OPJHL-E	
2000-01	49	11	35	1	2	171	246	25	9th OPJHL-E	
2001-02	49	16	26	5	2	184	209	39	8th OPJHL-E	
2002-03	49	21	22	3	3	206	254	48	6th OPJHL-E	
2003-04	49	21	24	2	2	194	230	46	6th OPJHL-E	
2004-05	49	8	36	2	3	133	261	21	10th OPJHL-E	
2005-06	49	11	35	1	2	144	282	25	9th OPJHL-E	Lost Conf. QF
2006-07	49	6	39	3	1	134	269	16	10th OPJHL-E	DNQ
2007-08	Did Not Participate									
Upper Canada Hockey Club
2008-09	49	9	39	-	1	115	286	19	9th OJHL-P	
Upper Canada Patriots
2009-10	50	15	31	-	4	163	244	34	9th CCHL-W	DNQ
2010-11	50	28	20	-	2	179	184	58	4th OJHL-S	Lost Round of 16
Toronto Lakeshore Patriots
2011-12	49	27	17	-	5	199	169	59	3rd OJHL-S	Lost Conf. Final
2012-13	55	34	16	-	5	213	154	73	3rd OJHL-S	
2013-14	53	35	12	-	6	196	145	76	1st OJHL-S	Won League, won DHC
2014-15	54	35	18	0	1	185	134	71	1st OJHL-S	Won League, lost in SF DHC
2015-16	54	18	28	1	7	177	158	44	5th of 6 South Div; 9th of 11 SW Conf; 18th of 22 OJHL	DNQ
2016-17	54	29	23	0	2	182	173	60	4th of 6 South Div; 9th of 11 SW Conf; 13th of 22 OJHL	Lost Conf. Quarters, 1-3 (B. Cougars)
2017-18	54	40	8	3	3	260	144	86	1st of 6 South Div; 1st of 11 SW Conf; 1st of 22 OJHL	Won Conf. Quarters, 4-0 (Flyers); Won Conf. Semis 4-3 (Blades); Lost Conf. Finals 3-4 (Raiders)
2018-19	54	30	22	0	2	201	197	86	3rd of 5 South Div; 5th of 11 SW Conf; 10th of 22 OJHL	Lost Conf. Quarters, 3-4 (Buzzers)
2019-20	54	31	17	1	4	225	191	67	2nd of 6 South Div; 4th of 12 SW Conf; 10th of 22 OJHL	Playoffs cancelled due to covid-19 pandemic
2020-21	Season cancelled due to covid-19 pandemic									
2021-22	53	18	30	0	5	179	200	41	4th of 6 South Div; 9th of 11 SE Conf; 17th of 21 OJHL	Lost Conf. Quarters, 1-2 (Jr. Canadiens)
2022-23	56	29	19	2	4	189	171	64	6th of 11 SE Conf; 11th of 21 OJHL	Lost Conf. Quarters, 1-4 (Huskies)
2023-24	56	22	27	3	4	157	207	51	9th of 12 West Conf; 18th of 24 OJHL	Did Not Qualify for post season
2024-25	56	31	19	2	4	208	176	68	5th of 12 West Conf; 10th of 24 OJHL	Lost Conf. Quarters, 1-4 (Jr. Sabres)
2025-26	56	47	8	0	1	296	132	6	1st of 12 West Conf; 1st of 24 OJHL	Won Conf. Quarters 4-0 (Chargers); Won Conf. Semifinal 4-0 (Menace); Won Conf. Finals 4-3 (Blues); Won OJHL Finals 4-1 (Hurricanes)

== Dudley Hewitt Cup ==
Central Canada Championships
Winners of the NOJHL, OJHL, SIJHL, and host
Round-robin play with 2nd vs. 3rd in semi-final to advance against 1st in the championship game.

Year	Round-robin	Record	Standing	Semifinal	Gold medal game
2014	W, Fort Frances Lakers 4–1; W, Kirkland Lake Gold Miners 4–1; L, Wellington Dukes 3–5	2–1–0	2nd of 4	W, Fort Frances Lakers 6–0	W, Wellington Dukes 2–1; Dudley Hewitt Cup Champions
2015	OTL, Fort Frances Lakers 1–2; W, Dryden Ice Dogs 6–0; OTW, Soo Thunderbirds 4–3	2–0–1	2nd of 4	L, Fort Frances Lakers 4–6	—

== Royal Bank Cup ==
Canadian Junior A National Championship
Dudley Hewitt Champions – Central, Fred Page Champions – Eastern, Western Canada Cup Champions – Western, Western Canada Cup – Runners-up and host
Round-robin play with top four advance to a semi-final and the winners to the championship game.

Year	Round-robin	Record W–OTW–OTL–L	Standing	Semifinal	Gold medal game
2014	L, Dauphin Kings 1–2; W, Yorkton Terriers 5–1; L, Carleton Place Canadians 2–4; OTL, Vernon Vipers 2–3	1–0–1–2	5th of 5	did not advance	

=== Playoffs ===
MetJHL Years

- 1997 Lost semi-final

Quinte Hawks defeated Wellington Dukes 4-games-to-1
Third in round-robin quarter-final (4–2)
Aurora Tigers defeated Quinte Hawks 4-games-to-2

- 1998 Lost quarter-final

Wexford Raiders defeated Quinte Hawks 3-games-to-none

== Centennial Cup ==
Year	Round-robin	Record W–OTW–OTL–L	Standing	Quarterfinal	Semifinal	Gold medal game
2026	W Greater Sudbury Cubs 8-3; W Flin Flon Bombers 7-2; L Truro Bearcats 1-6; L Longueuil Collège Français 4-7	2-0-0-2 (6 points)	3rd of 5 group B	W canmore Eagles 7-3	L Niverville Nighthawks 3-4	—

== Notable alumni ==
=== Quinte ===
- Ryan Barnes
- Mike Danton
- John Erskine
- Sheldon Keefe
- Rudi Ying
