= Geoff Sarjeant =

Canadian ice hockey player

- Born: November 30, 1969 (age 56) Orillia, Ontario, Canada
- Height: 5 ft 9 in (175 cm)
- Weight: 180 lb (82 kg; 12 st 12 lb)
- Position: Goaltender
- Caught: Right
- Played for: St. Louis Blues; San Jose Sharks
- NHL draft: 1990 NHL Supplemental Draft; St. Louis Blues
- Playing career: 1992–2001

Geoff Ian Sarjeant (born November 30, 1969) is a Canadian former professional ice hockey goaltender. He was drafted out of Michigan Tech by the St. Louis Blues in the 1990 NHL Supplemental Draft. He played four games in the National Hockey League (NHL) with the Blues in the 1994–95 season and four more with the San Jose Sharks in the 1995–96 season. Sarjeant was born in Orillia, Ontario.

In his brief NHL career, Sarjeant posted a record of 1–2–1 with a 4.12 GAA and a save percentage of .856.

In December 2025, Sarjeant was named President of True Sports.

== Career statistics ==
=== Regular season and playoffs ===
			Regular season									Playoffs
Season	Team	League	GP	W	L	T	MIN	GA	SO	GAA	SV%	GP	W	L	MIN	GA	SO	GAA	SV%
1985–86	Newmarket Royals	OJAHL	—	—	—	—	—	—	—	—	—	—	—	—	—	—	—	—	—
1986–87	Aurora Eagles	OJAHL	28	14	8	3	1624	130	0	4.80	—	—	—	—	—	—	—	—	—
1987–88	Aurora Eagles	OJHL	33	—	—	—	1878	136	0	4.35	—	—	—	—	—	—	—	—	—
1988–89	Michigan Tech	WCHA	6	0	3	2	329	22	0	4.01	.897	—	—	—	—	—	—	—	—
1989–90	Michigan Tech	WCHA	19	4	13	0	1043	94	0	5.41	.876	—	—	—	—	—	—	—	—
1990–91	Michigan Tech	WCHA	23	5	15	3	1540	97	0	3.78	.899	—	—	—	—	—	—	—	—
1991–92	Michigan Tech	WCHA	23	7	13	0	1201	90	1	4.50	.876	—	—	—	—	—	—	—	—
1992–93	Peoria Rivermen	IHL	41	22	14	3	2356	130	0	3.31	.893	3	0	3	179	13	0	4.36	.906
1993–94	Peoria Rivermen	IHL	41	25	9	2	2275	93	2	2.45	.916	4	2	2	211	13	0	3.69	.874
1994–95	St. Louis Blues	NHL	4	1	0	0	120	6	0	3.00	.885	—	—	—	—	—	—	—	—
1994–95	Peoria Rivermen	IHL	55	32	12	8	3146	158	0	3.01	.901	4	0	3	206	20	0	5.81	.821
1995–96	San Jose Sharks	NHL	4	0	2	1	171	14	0	4.92	.839	—	—	—	—	—	—	—	—
1995–96	Kansas City Blades	IHL	41	18	16	1	2167	140	1	3.88	.880	2	0	1	99	3	0	1.82	.950
1996–97	Cincinnati Cyclones	IHL	59	32	20	5	3287	157	1	2.87	.919	3	0	3	158	12	0	4.55	—
1997–98	Cincinnati Cyclones	IHL	54	25	19	9	3118	142	5	2.73	.911	5	4	1	353	14	0	2.38	.923
1998–99	Cincinnati Cyclones	IHL	14	6	5	1	733	42	1	3.44	.892	—	—	—	—	—	—	—	—
1998–99	Flint Generals	UHL	3	0	2	1	179	11	0	3.69	.890	—	—	—	—	—	—	—	—
1998–99	Detroit Vipers	IHL	8	1	5	1	421	26	0	3.71	.873	—	—	—	—	—	—	—	—
1998–99	Long Beach Ice Dogs	IHL	1	1	0	0	60	1	0	1.00	.889	—	—	—	—	—	—	—	—
1998–99	Indianapolis Ice	IHL	23	13	7	2	1354	57	2	2.53	.928	3	0	1	115	10	0	5.22	.828
1999–00	Ayr Scottish Eagles	BISL	23	9	10	4	1396	62	0	2.97	.907	6	2	4	359	13	0	2.17	.937
2000–01	Moskitos Essen	DEL	48	—	—	—	2743	166	1	3.63	.902	—	—	—	—	—	—	—	—
NHL totals			8	1	2	1	291	20	0	4.13	.856	—	—	—	—	—	—	—	—

Awards and achievements
Preceded by Brad Werenka	WCHA Student-Athlete of the Year; 1991–92	Succeeded by Brett Hauer
