= Dave Lumley =

Canadian ice hockey player

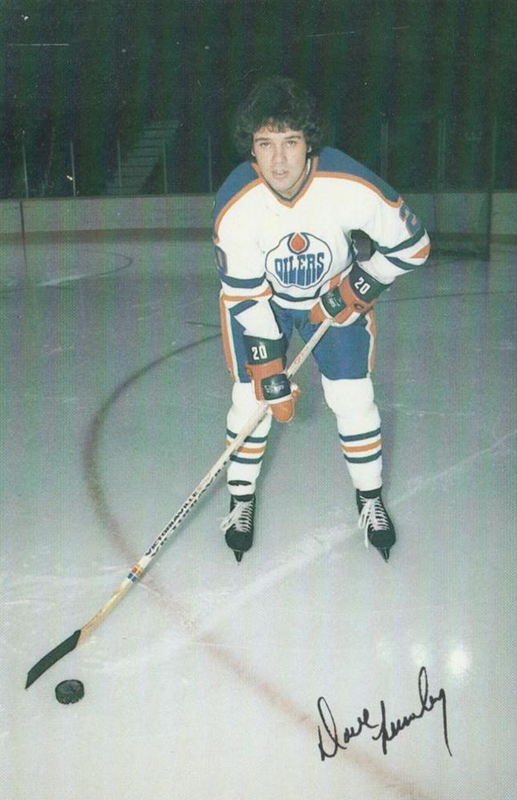
- Lumley in 1979 postcard
- Born: September 1, 1954 (age 71) Toronto, Ontario, Canada
- Height: 5 ft 11 in (180 cm)
- Weight: 180 lb (82 kg; 12 st 12 lb)
- Position: Right wing
- Shot: Right
- Played for: Edmonton Oilers; Hartford Whalers; Montreal Canadiens
- NHL draft: 199th overall, 1974; Montreal Canadiens
- WHA draft: 79th overall, 1974; Vancouver Blazers
- Playing career: 1979–1986

David Earl Lumley (born September 1, 1954) is a Canadian former professional ice hockey player. Lumley was selected in both the twelfth round of the 1974 NHL amateur draft (199th overall) by the Montreal Canadiens and in the eighth round of the 1974 WHA Amateur Draft (108th overall), by the Vancouver Blazers. Electing to pursue an NHL career, Lumley eventually played parts of nine seasons with the Canadiens, Edmonton Oilers and Hartford Whalers, winning the Stanley Cup on two occasions 1984 and 1985 with the Edmonton Oilers.

== Early life ==
Lumley's formative hockey skills were developed playing in the West Hill Minor and the Scarborough Hockey Associations. As a youth, he played in the 1967 Quebec International Pee-Wee Hockey Tournament with the Toronto Shopsy's minor ice hockey team. He attended high school at Sir Wilfrid Laurier Collegiate Institute and lived in Guildwood Village from 1968 to 1973.

== Amateur career ==
After a single season in the Ontario Hockey Association's Junior A Richmond Hill Rams, Lumley decided to pursue the game by going to the University of New Hampshire Wildcats, who competed in the ECAC. At the time, this was viewed as an unconventional route, as most prospective NHL'ers spent their amateur career in the Canadian Hockey League. Lumley also played lacrosse at the University of New Hampshire. He was a 12th round selection in the 1974 Amateur Draft, and instead of turning professional right away he completed his college eligibility playing for the Wildcats, putting up 170 points in just 126 games.

== Professional career ==
Lumley joined the Montreal Canadiens organization, and spent the majority of his first two seasons with their American Hockey League affiliate, the Nova Scotia Voyageurs. His play improved dramatically in his second season, where he was named a second-team all-star and was rewarded with a three-game call-up with the Canadiens. On June 13, 1979, Montreal traded Lumley and Dan Newman to the Edmonton Oilers in exchange for a second round pick, which was used on future NHL'er Ric Nattress.

The following season (1979–80) Lumley made the Oilers out of training camp and posted solid totals in both points and penalty minutes in his official rookie season. Lumley would spend a total of five seasons, including a Stanley Cup win, before being claimed in the 1984 NHL Waiver Draft by the Hartford Whalers. Lumley's time in Hartford was limited however, as after 48 games the Whalers put him on waivers, where he was reclaimed by the Edmonton Oilers, allowing him to be a part of their second Cup-winning team. Lumley played a limited role on the 1985–86 team, and just one game into the 1986–87 NHL season, he announced his retirement.

== Awards ==
- American Hockey League Second All-Star Team (1979)
- Stanley Cup champions (1984, 1985)

== Career statistics ==
=== Regular season and playoffs ===
			Regular season					Playoffs
Season	Team	League	GP	G	A	Pts	PIM	GP	G	A	Pts	PIM
1972–73	Richmond Hill Rams	OPJHL	—	—	—	—	—	—	—	—	—	—
1973–74	University of New Hampshire	ECAC	31	12	19	31	38	—	—	—	—	—
1974–75	University of New Hampshire	ECAC	26	12	26	38	56	—	—	—	—	—
1975–76	University of New Hampshire	ECAC	30	9	32	41	55	—	—	—	—	—
1976–77	University of New Hampshire	ECAC	39	22	38	60	42	—	—	—	—	—
1977–78	Nova Scotia Voyageurs	AHL	58	22	21	43	58	2	0	1	1	5
1978–79	Montreal Canadiens	NHL	3	0	0	0	0	—	—	—	—	—
1978–79	Nova Scotia Voyageurs	AHL	61	22	58	80	160	10	6	8	14	35
1979–80	Edmonton Oilers	NHL	80	20	38	58	138	3	1	0	1	12
1980–81	Edmonton Oilers	NHL	53	7	9	16	74	7	1	0	1	4
1981–82	Edmonton Oilers	NHL	66	32	42	74	96	5	2	1	3	21
1982–83	Edmonton Oilers	NHL	72	13	24	37	158	16	0	0	0	19
1983–84	Edmonton Oilers	NHL	56	6	15	21	68	19	2	5	7	44
1984–85	Hartford Whalers	NHL	48	8	20	28	98	—	—	—	—	—
1984–85	Edmonton Oilers	NHL	12	1	3	4	13	8	0	0	0	29
1985–86	Edmonton Oilers	NHL	46	11	9	20	35	3	0	2	2	2
1986–87	Edmonton Oilers	NHL	1	0	0	0	0	—	—	—	—	—
NHL totals			437	98	160	258	680	61	6	8	14	131
