= St. Michael's Buzzers =

- City: Toronto, Ontario, Canada
- League: Ontario Junior Hockey League
- Founded: 1917
- Home arena: St. Michael's College School Arena
- Colours: Navy blue, Baby blue, and White
- Owner: Board of Directors
- General manager: Rich Ricci
- Head coach: Rich Ricci
- Affiliates: St. Michael's College School Majors

Franchise history
- 1990: merged w/ Vaughan Raiders

Current uniform

The St. Michael's Buzzers are a Junior "A" ice hockey team from Toronto, Ontario, Canada. They compete in the Ontario Junior Hockey League (OJHL).

== History ==
The St. Michael's Buzzers date back to at least 1920, as future NHLer Bobby Bauer had made his home at St. Mikes for the 1930-31 season. The team was founded around 1932-33.

The Buzzers won the first ever Sutherland Cup as All-Ontario Junior "B" Champions in 1934, and won it again in 1936, 1945, 1961, 1982, and 1989. They also won the Frank L. Buckland Trophy as OPJHL Champions in 2005, 2006 and 2013.

The 1933-34 season saw them finish second in the Ontario Hockey Association Junior Hockey League behind their own parent club, the Toronto St. Michael's Majors. As "A" champions, the Majors went on to win the Memorial Cup, while the Buzzers went on to win the Sutherland Cup as Ontario "B" champions. The next season, the Big 10 Junior B league was formed and the Buzzers left to join it.

In the 1950s, the Buzzers established themselves in the Metro Junior B Hockey League. In 1961, the Buzzers defeated the Big 10's Owen Sound Greys 4-games-to-none to win the Sutherland Cup. They played from 1961 to 1963 as an independent Jr.B club, as their parent club, the Toronto St. Michael's Majors, struggled financially. In 1966-67 the team again took a one-year leave of absence. Despite this, the Buzzers played during the glory years of the Metro league. In 1972, the Ontario Provincial Junior A Hockey League was formed and raided the league for all but four of its charter members, of which one of these teams folded. A season later, the OPJHL also took the Markham Waxers leaving the Metro league with only the Buzzers and Toronto Nationals as the league's original blood. By 1980, the Nationals had folded and had left the Buzzers as the only team left in a twelve team league that pre-dated the 1972 realignment.

The team again took a leave of absence in 1989 after their Sutherland Cup championship, after the Metro League's dispute with the OHA. The following season the Vaughan Raiders merged with the Buzzers, assuming the Buzzer name. The Buzzers left the Metro league in 1995 to join the new Ontario Provincial Junior A Hockey League.

The Buzzers disbanded in 1997 to make way for the Ontario Hockey League's St. Michael's Majors. They reformed in 1999, and won the OJHL Championship in 2005, 2006 and 2013.

== Season-by-season results ==
Season	GP	W	L	T	OTL	GF	GA	P	Results	Playoffs
1932-33	6	3	1	2	-	12	6	8	1st OHA Gr. 4	
1933-34	6	6	0	0	-	37	10	12	1st Toronto Prep	Won league, won SC
1934-35	6	6	0	0	-	--	--	12	1st OHA Gr. 6	Won league, lost SC Final
1935-36	8	6	1	1	-	--	--	13	1st Toronto Prep	Won league, won SC
1936-37	8	2	6	0	-	37	41	4	4th Toronto Prep	
1937-38	8	4	4	0	-	31	30	8	4th Toronto Prep	
1938-39	7	1	6	0	-	18	41	2	5th Toronto Prep	
1939-40	6	3	2	1	-	28	25	7	2nd Toronto Prep	
1940-41	5	2	2	1	-	14	16	5	2nd Toronto Prep	
1941-42	8	2	6	0	-	29	36	4	5th Toronto Prep	
1942-43	8	5	3	0	-	40	30	10	2nd Toronto Prep	
1943-44	9	3	4	2	-	27	30	8	3rd Toronto Prep	DNQ
1944-45	11	11	0	0	-	90	21	22	1st Toronto Prep	Won league, won SC
1945-46	8	7	1	0	-	91	21	14	1st Toronto Prep	
1946-47	12	7	5	0	-	51	40	14	3rd Toronto Jr. B	
1947-48	11	6	4	0	-	38	30	12	2nd Toronto Jr. B	Won league, lost SC
1948-49	15	6	9	0	-	46	51	12	4th Toronto Jr. B	
1949-50	24	8	12	4	-	--	--	20	3rd Toronto Jr. B	
1950-51	19	11	6	2	-	110	79	24	2nd Metro B	Lost semi-final
1951-52	20	14	5	1	-	108	65	29	2nd Metro B	Lost final
1952-53	29	12	15	2	-	133	119	26	4th Metro B	Lost semi-final
1953-54	32	16	14	2	-	133	148	34	5th Metro B	Lost final
1954-55	20	8	10	2	-	61	81	18	6th Metro B	Lost quarter-final
1955-56	28	10	17	1	-	80	136	21	7th Metro B	DNQ
1956-57	24	10	12	2	-	105	110	22	4th Metro B	Won league
1957-58	24	16	6	2	-	--	--	34	1st Metro B	Lost semi-final
1958-59	28	10	17	1	-	97	109	21	6th Metro B	Lost quarter-final
1959-60	28	19	6	3	-	129	88	41	1st Metro B	Lost semi-final
1960-61	28	21	6	1	-	154	72	43	1st Metro B	Won league, won SC
1961-63	Did not participate									
1963-64	32	9	19	4	-	111	148	22	9th Metro B	Lost semi-final
1964-65	36	15	14	7	-	151	152	37	6th Metro B	Lost quarter-final
1965-66	35	14	17	4	-	143	153	32	5th Metro B	Lost quarter-final
1966-67	Did not participate									
1967-68	36	22	10	4	-	178	135	48	2nd Metro B	Lost final
1968-69	36	24	11	1	-	171	117	49	2nd Metro B	Lost final
1969-70	36	28	5	3	-	297	134	59	1st Metro B	Lost semi-final
1970-71	44	24	15	5	-	242	201	53	5th Metro B	Lost quarter-final
1971-72	44	13	25	6	-	186	252	32	10th Metro B	
1972-73	34	8	21	5	-	135	195	21	10th Metro B	
1973-74	44	23	18	3	-	262	246	49	5th Metro B	
1974-75	38	22	14	2	-	194	181	46	6th Metro B	
1975-76	36	17	12	7	-	154	138	41	6th Metro B	
1976-77	36	16	14	6	-	150	134	38	6th Metro B	
1977-78	36	25	10	1	-	192	127	51	2nd Metro B	
1978-79	44	25	8	11	-	245	152	61	3rd Metro B	
1979-80	42	28	9	5	-	258	182	61	1st Metro B	
1980-81	42	24	10	8	-	230	174	57	1st Metro B	Won league
1981-82	35	22	7	6	-	201	126	50	2nd Metro B	Won league, won SC
1982-83	36	21	13	2	-	171	146	44	4th Metro B	
1983-84	42	20	16	6	-	233	196	46	5th Metro B	
1984-85	36	10	21	5	-	145	176	25	10th Metro B	DNQ
1985-86	36	19	15	2	-	228	184	40	5th Metro B	Lost quarter-final
1986-87	37	21	11	5	-	215	138	47	3rd Metro B	Lost semi-final
1987-88	37	16	14	7	-	206	181	39	7th Metro B	Lost quarter-final
1988-89	39	33	5	1	-	276	114	67	1st Metro B	Won league. Won SC
1989-90	Did not participate									
1990-91	44	22	16	6	-	207	169	50	5th Metro B	
1991-92	44	18	21	5	-	222	221	41	8th Metro A	
1992-93	48	26	16	6	-	234	190	56	4th Metro A	
1993-94	50	25	19	6	-	249	204	56	6th Metro A	Lost quarter-final
1994-95	50	26	18	6	-	230	203	58	5th Metro A	
1995-96	50	21	26	3	-	212	205	47	5th OPJHL-Me	
1996-97	51	26	22	3	-	210	173	59	4th OPJHL-Me	
1997-99	Did not participate									
1999-00	49	18	28	3	0	183	231	39	7th OPJHL-S	
2000-01	49	23	22	3	1	204	215	50	6th OPJHL-S	
2001-02	49	34	10	4	1	230	145	73	2nd OPJHL-S	
2002-03	49	25	15	6	3	209	174	59	3rd OPJHL-S	
2003-04	49	33	13	1	2	249	163	69	1st OPJHL-S	Lost final
2004-05	49	36	7	4	2	259	128	78	2nd OPJHL-S	Won league
2005-06	49	29	12	5	3	226	153	66	1st OPJHL-S	Won league
2006-07	49	33	9	7	0	209	128	73	2nd OPJHL-S	Lost semi-final
2007-08	49	43	4	-	2	291	124	88	1st OPJHL-S	Lost Division Final
2008-09	53	24	24	-	5	227	249	53	6th OJHL-C	
2009-10	50	25	21	-	4	194	205	54	7th CCHL-W	Lost Preliminary
2010-11	50	27	21	-	2	225	174	56	5th OJHL-S	Lost Qualifier
2011-12	49	37	8	-	4	215	135	78	1st OJHL-S	Lost Conf. Final
2012-13	55	37	15	-	3	224	151	77	1st OJHL-S	Won league
2013-14	53	27	19	-	7	185	153	61	3rd OJHL-S	Lost Conf. QF
2014-15	54	22	23	0	9	157	203	53	5th of 6 South Div; 6th of 12 SW Conf; 14th of 22 OJHL	Lost Conf. Quarters 0-4 (Patriots)
2015-16	54	28	23	1	2	196	182	59	4th of 6 South Div; 7th of 11 SW Conf; 13th of 22 OJHL	Lost Conf. Quarters 2-4 (Blades)
2016-17	54	28	19	0	7	213	174	63	2nd of 6 South Div; 4th of 11 SW Conf; 10th of 22 OJHL	Lost Conf. Quarters 3-4 (Jr. Canadiens)
2017-18	54	24	25	3	2	184	197	53	5th of 6 South Div; 7th of 11 SW Conf ??th of 22 OJHL	Lost Conf. Quarters 0-4 (Raiders)
2018-19	54	30	22	0	2	197	179	62	2nd of 5 South Div; 6th of 11 SE Conf; 9th of 22 OJHL	Won Conf. Quarters 4-3 (Patriots); Lost Conf Semifinals 0-4 (Rangers)
2019-20	54	29	18	2	5	229	184	65	3rd of 6 South Div; 5th of 11 SE Conf; 9th of 22 OJHL	Won Conf. Quarters 4-0 (Patriots); Remaining playoffs cancelled due to COVID-19
2020-21	Season cancelled due to COVID-19									
2021-22	54	31	20	1	2	179	168	65	3rd of 6 South Div; 6th of 11 SE Conf; 9th of 21 OJHL	Lost Conf. Quarters 1-2 (Rangers)
2022-23	54	23	25	2	4	179	168	52	7th of 12 SE Conf; 15th of 24 OJHL	Lost Conf. Quarters 4-1 (Dukes)
2023-24	56	34	15	1	6	221	186	75	2nd of 12 East Conf; 5th of 24 OJHL	Won Conf. Quarters 4-0 (Royals); Lost Conf Semifinals 3-4 (Cougars)
2024-25	56	30	20	2	4	220	174	66	6th of 12 East Conf; 12th of 24 OJHL	Lost Conf. Quarters 2-4 (Huskies)
2025-26	56	25	24	2	5	187	216	57	7th of 12 East Conf; 15th of 24 OJHL	Lost Conf. Quarters 2-4 (Spirit)

=== Playoffs ===
MetJHL Years

- 1991 Lost quarter-final

Henry Carr Crusaders defeated St. Michael's Buzzers 4-games-to-none

- 1992 Lost quarter-final

St. Michael's Buzzers defeated Weston Dodgers 3-games-to-none
Muskoka Bears defeated St. Michael's Buzzers 4-games-to-3

- 1993 Lost final

St. Michael's Buzzers defeated Mississauga Senators 4-games-to-2
St. Michael's Buzzers defeated Muskoka Bears 4-games-to-none
Wexford Raiders defeated St. Michael's Buzzers 4-games-to-1

- 1994 Lost quarter-final

Muskoka Bears defeated St. Michael's Buzzers 4-games-to-2

- 1995 Lost semi-final

St. Michael's Buzzers defeated Aurora Eagles 4-games-to-2
Caledon Canadians defeated St. Michael's Buzzers 4-games-to-none

OJHL Years

=== Sutherland Cup appearances ===
1961: St. Michael's Buzzers defeated Owen Sound Greys 4-games-to-none
1982: St. Michael's Buzzers defeated Sarnia Bees 4-games-to-3
1989: St. Michael's Buzzers defeated Niagara Falls Canucks 4-games-to-1

== Vaughan Raiders ==
Vaughan Raiders
- City: Vaughan, Ontario, Canada
- League: Central Junior B Hockey League; Metro Junior B Hockey League
- Operated: 1984-1990
- Colors: Green, Black, and White

Franchise history
- 1990: merged w/ St. Michael's Buzzers

Season	GP	W	L	T	OTL	GF	GA	P	Results	Playoffs
1984-85	40	14	19	7	-	172	202	35	7th CJBHL	
1985-86	48	22	19	7	-	246	231	51	6th CJBHL	
1986-87	42	16	16	10	-	190	195	42	5th CJBHL	
1987-88	44	29	9	6	-	260	195	64	3rd CJBHL	
1988-89	42	21	19	2	-	204	190	44	8th CJBHL	
1989-90	44	16	25	3	-	200	211	35	8th Metro B	

== Notable alumni ==
- Bob Babcock
- Bobby Bauer
- Frank Bennett
- Mike Boland
- Kip Brennan
- Greg Britz
- Brad Brown
- Connor Brown
- Brandon Burlon
- Sean Burke
- Charlie Burns
- Jack Caffery
- Billy Carroll
- Louie Caporusso
- Gino Cavallini
- Andre Champagne
- Gerry Cheevers
- Andrew Cogliano
- Mike Corbett
- Mike Corrigan
- Rob Cowie
- Jack Crawford
- Doug Dadswell
- Rob Davison
- Joe Day
- Gord Dineen
- Kevin Dineen
- Bruce Draper
- Dick Duff
- Craig Duncanson
- Todd Elik
- John English
- Jake Evans
- Larry Fullan
- Dave Gardner
- Paul Gardner
- Paul Gillis
- Mike Glumac
- Chris Govedaris
- Pat Graham
- Ray Hannigan
- Jeff Harding
- David Harlock
- Derek Holmes
- Brayden Irwin
- John Jakopin
- Larry Keenan
- Red Kelly
- Dave Keon
- Ken Klee
- Brett Lindros
- Eric Lindros
- David Ling
- Billy MacMillan
- Pete Mahovlich
- Dave Maloney
- Mitch Marner
- Jean Marois
- Wes McCauley
- Bill McDonagh
- John McLellan
- Scott McLellan
- Nick Metz
- Norm Milley
- Craig Mills
- Garry Monahan
- Steve Montador
- Craig Muni
- Jason Muzzatti
- Peanuts O'Flaherty
- Tom O'Neill
- Jim Paek
- Geoff Platt
- Tom Polanic
- Marc Reaume
- Mike Rosati
- Ed Sandford
- Howard Scruton
- Rod Seiling
- Richard Shulmistra
- Carl Smith
- Brendan Smith
- Reilly Smith
- Rory Smith
- Anthony Stewart
- Mike Stothers
- Peter Sullivan
- Andy Sutton
- Tony Tanti
- Billy Taylor
- Rick Tocchet
- Kevin Weekes
- Wojtek Wolski
- Jason Woolley
- Mitch Marner
- Dwight Schofield

Raiders

- Manny Legace
