= Dixie Beehives =

Junior ice hockey team (1949–86)

- City: Weston, Ontario
- League: Central Junior B Hockey League
- Operated: 1949–1986 (Junior A); 1974–1982 (Junior B)
- Home arena: Dixie Arena Gardens
- Colours: Red and white

Dixie Beehives are a pair of defunct junior ice hockey teams from Weston, Ontario, Canada, which is now part of Toronto, Ontario. They played in the Ontario Provincial Junior A Hockey League and the Central Junior B Hockey League.

== Jr. A Beehives ==
Founded in 1949 in what became the Metro Junior B Hockey League (in 1956). The Staffords disappeared but were replaced when the East York Rockets moved to Mississauga in 1953. The Beehives won Metro Junior B titles in 1970 and 1971. They joined the new Ontario Provincial Junior "A" league in 1972 and stayed until the league began to fall apart in 1986, although the Beehives folded a year before the league did due to their rink being sold and closed down. The Beehives were three time Sutherland Cup All-Ontario Junior "B" Champions: 1957, 1970, and 1971.

Their first Sutherland Cup came in 1957 when St. Michael's Buzzers refused to take part in provincial playdowns due to exams. Dixie defeated the Peterborough Stoneys of the Eastern Junior B Hockey League and the Sarnia Legionnaires of the Western Junior B Hockey League to win the Sutherland Cup 4-games-to-2. In 1967, the Beehives made it back to the Sutherland Cup but were thwarted 4-games-to-2 by the Kitchener Greenshirts. In 1970 and 1971 as Metro Champs, they came back again defeating the Hamilton Mountain Bees both years 4-games-to-1 with one tie and 4-games-to-1 respectively.

In 2007, it was announced that the Oswego Admirals of the Ontario Provincial Junior A Hockey League had been bought by interests in Weston. The team moved to the Weston Arena and took the name Toronto Dixie Beehives. They were scheduled to begin play in September 2007.

Dixie Staffords 1949 – 1950
East York Rockets 1950 – 1953
Dixie Rockets 1953 – 1957
Dixie Beehives 1957 – 1986

== Season-by-season results ==
| Season | GP | W | L | T | OTL | GF | GA | P | Results | Playoffs |
| 1951-52 | 20 | 8 | 10 | 2 | - | 87 | 98 | 18 | 4th MetJHL | |
| 1952-53 | 29 | 9 | 18 | 2 | - | 105 | 139 | 20 | 6th MetJHL | |
| 1953-54 | 32 | 12 | 19 | 1 | - | 137 | 164 | 25 | 7th MetJHL | |
| 1954-55 | 20 | 13 | 7 | 0 | - | 69 | 57 | 26 | 3rd MetJHL | |
| 1955-56 | 28 | 7 | 19 | 2 | - | 107 | 137 | 16 | 8th MetJHL | |
| 1956-57 | 24 | 9 | 12 | 3 | - | 99 | 97 | 21 | 5th MetJHL | Lost final, won SC |
| 1957-58 | 24 | 13 | 9 | 2 | - | 115 | 81 | 28 | 4th MetJHL | |
| 1958-59 | 28 | 19 | 9 | 0 | - | 136 | 110 | 38 | 2nd MetJHL | |
| 1959-60 | 28 | 9 | 14 | 5 | - | 103 | 119 | 23 | 7th MetJHL | |
| 1960-61 | 28 | 11 | 14 | 3 | - | 106 | 120 | 25 | 6th MetJHL | |
| 1961-62 | 32 | 13 | 17 | 2 | - | 121 | 137 | 28 | 4th MetJHL | |
| 1962-63 | 32 | 16 | 14 | 2 | - | 165 | 137 | 34 | 3rd MetJHL | |
| 1963-64 | 34 | 14 | 17 | 3 | - | 133 | 134 | 31 | 7th MetJHL | |
| 1964-65 | 35 | 6 | 24 | 5 | - | 118 | 189 | 17 | 9th MetJHL | |
| 1965-66 | 35 | 5 | 18 | 12 | - | 98 | 144 | 22 | 8th MetJHL | |
| 1966-67 | 36 | 15 | 14 | 7 | - | 131 | 126 | 37 | 5th MetJHL | Won league |
| 1967-68 | 36 | 27 | 5 | 4 | - | 175 | 94 | 58 | 1st MetJHL | |
| 1968-69 | 36 | 19 | 14 | 3 | - | 147 | 125 | 41 | 3rd MetJHL | |
| 1969-70 | 36 | 23 | 7 | 6 | - | 214 | 124 | 52 | 4th MetJHL | Won league, won SC |
| 1970-71 | 44 | 32 | 9 | 3 | - | 249 | 165 | 67 | 1st Metro B | Won league, won SC |
| 1971-72 | 44 | 23 | 17 | 4 | - | 206 | 162 | 50 | 4th Metro B | |
| 1972-73 | 44 | 23 | 17 | 4 | - | 232 | 197 | 50 | 4th OPJHL | |
| 1973-74 | 44 | 18 | 20 | 6 | - | 207 | 227 | 42 | 8th OPJHL | |
| 1974-75 | 44 | 18 | 15 | 11 | - | 213 | 211 | 47 | 9th OPJHL | |
| 1975-76 | 44 | 6 | 34 | 4 | - | 135 | 287 | 16 | 12th OPJHL | |
| 1976-77 | 44 | 3 | 36 | 5 | - | 161 | 306 | 11 | 12th OPJHL | |
| 1977-78 | 50 | 33 | 10 | 7 | - | 326 | 245 | 73 | 2nd OPJHL | |
| 1978-79 | 50 | 29 | 18 | 3 | - | 240 | 219 | 61 | 4th OPJHL | |
| 1979-80 | 44 | 33 | 5 | 6 | - | 286 | 173 | 72 | 1st OPJHL | |
| 1980-81 | 44 | 23 | 19 | 2 | - | 210 | 208 | 48 | 4th OPJHL | |
| 1981-82 | 50 | 19 | 24 | 7 | - | 236 | 234 | 45 | 6th OJHL | |
| 1982-83 | 48 | 25 | 18 | 5 | - | 245 | 240 | 55 | 2nd OJHL | |
| 1983-84 | 42 | 27 | 10 | 5 | - | 269 | 182 | 61 | 1st OJHL | |
| 1984-85 | 48 | 25 | 18 | 5 | - | 263 | 235 | 55 | 4th OJHL | |
| 1985-86 | 50 | 10 | 33 | 7 | - | 208 | 281 | 27 | 6th OJHL | |

=== Playoffs ===
- 1973 Lost semi-final

Dixie Beehives defeated Seneca Flyers 4-games-to-3
Wexford Raiders defeated Dixie Beehives 4-games-to-2

- 1974 Lost quarter-final

North York Rangers defeated Dixie Beehives 4-games-to-3

- 1975 DNQ
- 1976 DNQ
- 1977 DNQ
- 1978 Lost semi-final

Dixie Beehives defeated Aurora Tigers 4-games-to-1
Royal York Royals defeated Dixie Beehives 4-games-to-none

- 1979 Lost final

Dixie Beehives defeated Aurora Tigers 4-games-to-none
Dixie Beehives defeated North Bay Trappers 4-games-to-3
Guelph Platers defeated Dixie Beehives 4-games-to-1

- 1980 Lost semi-final

Dixie Beehives defeated Wexford Raiders 4-games-to-none
North York Rangers defeated Dixie Beehives 4-games-to-2

- 1981 Lost quarter-final

North York Rangers defeated Dixie Beehives 4-games-to-1

- 1982 Lost semi-final

Dixie Beehives defeated Brampton Warriors 4-games-to-1
Markham Waxers defeated Dixie Beehives 4-games-to-2

- 1983 Lost quarter-final

Hamilton Mountain A's defeated Dixie Beehives 4-games-to-1

- 1984 Lost final

Dixie Beehives defeated Aurora Tigers 4-games-to-none
Dixie Beehives defeated Newmarket Flyers 4-games-to-3
Orillia Travelways defeated Dixie Beehives 4-games-to-1

- 1985 Lost quarter-final

Markham Waxers defeated Dixie Beehives 4-games-to-1

- 1986 DNQ

=== Sutherland Cup appearances ===
1957: Dixie Rockets defeated Sarnia Legionnaires 4-games-to-2 with 1 tie
1967: Kitchener Greenshirts defeated Dixie Beehives 4-games-to-2
1970: Dixie Beehives defeated Hamilton Red Wings 4-games-to-1 with 1 tie
1971: Dixie Beehives defeated Hamilton Red Wings 4-games-to-1

== Jr. B Beehives ==
Originally known as the Dixie Ventures, the Central Junior B Hockey League team changed their name to the Beehives and became the affiliate of the Dixie Beehives Jr. A (1957–1986) from the OHA Tier II Junior "A" League. They folded in 1982.

Dixie Ventures

Dixie Ventures 1974 - 1977
Dixie Beehives 1977 - 1982

== Jr. B season-by-season results ==
| Season | GP | W | L | T | OTL | GF | GA | P | Results | Playoffs |
| 1974-75 | 40 | 8 | 31 | 1 | - | 167 | 299 | 17 | 6th CJBHL | |
| 1975-76 | 36 | 12 | 20 | 4 | - | 165 | 189 | 28 | 6th CJBHL | |
| 1976-77 | 42 | 26 | 13 | 3 | - | 230 | 162 | 55 | 2nd CJBHL | |
| 1977-78 | 42 | 27 | 11 | 4 | - | 295 | 197 | 58 | 2nd CJBHL | |
| 1978-79 | 44 | 14 | 24 | 6 | - | 205 | 227 | 34 | 9th CJBHL | |
| 1979-80 | 44 | 25 | 15 | 4 | - | 231 | 195 | 54 | 4th CJBHL | |
| 1980-81 | 44 | 16 | 23 | 5 | - | 197 | 257 | 37 | 9th CJBHL | |
| 1981-82 | 40 | 7 | 31 | 2 | - | 153 | 287 | 16 | 10th CJBHL | |

== Notable alumni ==
- Peter Bakovic
- Paul Beraldo
- Dave Burrows
- Randy Cunneyworth
- Denis DeJordy
- Rick Dudley
- John Grisdale
- Mike Hough
- Mike Kaszycki
- Nick Kypreos
- Ray LeBlanc
- Mike Liut
- Brett MacDonald
- Bill McDougall
- Dave McLlwain
- Gus Mortson
- Doug Patey
- Larry Patey
- Dave Poulin
- Mike Ralph
- Dave Reid
- Bob Russell
- Mike Sands
- Brendan Shanahan
- Bob Sicinski
- Fred Stanfield
- Jack Stanfield
- Bill Stewart
- Warren Young
