= Bob Babcock (ice hockey) =

Canadian ice hockey player (born 1968)

- Born: August 3, 1968 (age 57) Agincourt, Ontario, Canada
- Height: 6 ft 0 in (183 cm)
- Weight: 222 lb (101 kg; 15 st 12 lb)
- Position: Defenceman
- Shot: Left
- Played for: Washington Capitals
- NHL draft: 208th overall, 1986; Washington Capitals
- Playing career: 1989–1994

Robert F. Babcock (born August 3, 1968) is a Canadian former professional ice hockey defenceman who played two games in the National Hockey League for the Washington Capitals in the 1990s. He was selected by the Capitals in the 10th round (208th overall) of the 1986 NHL entry draft.

As a youth, he played in the 1981 Quebec International Pee-Wee Hockey Tournament with the Toronto Young Nationals minor ice hockey team.

== Career statistics ==
			Regular season					Playoffs
Season	Team	League	GP	G	A	Pts	PIM	GP	G	A	Pts	PIM
1984–85	St. Michael's Buzzers	MJBHL	40	8	30	38	140	—	—	—	—	—
1985–86	Sault Ste. Marie Greyhounds	OHL	50	1	7	8	188	—	—	—	—	—
1986–87	Sault Ste. Marie Greyhounds	OHL	62	7	8	15	243	4	0	0	0	11
1987–88	Sault Ste. Marie Greyhounds	OHL	8	0	2	2	30	—	—	—	—	—
1987–88	Cornwall Royals	OHL	42	0	16	16	120	—	—	—	—	—
1988–89	Cornwall Royals	OHL	42	0	9	9	163	18	1	3	4	29
1989–90	Baltimore Skipjacks	AHL	67	0	4	4	249	7	0	0	0	23
1990–91	Washington Capitals	NHL	1	0	0	0	0	—	—	—	—	—
1990–91	Baltimore Skipjacks	AHL	38	0	3	3	112	—	—	—	—	—
1991–92	Baltimore Skipjacks	AHL	26	0	2	2	55	—	—	—	—	—
1992–93	Washington Capitals	NHL	1	0	0	0	2	—	—	—	—	—
1992–93	Baltimore Skipjacks	AHL	26	0	2	2	93	—	—	—	—	—
1992–93	Hampton Roads Admirals	ECHL	26	3	13	16	96	1	0	0	0	10
1993–94	Binghamton Rangers	AHL	20	1	6	7	67	—	—	—	—	—
2010–11	Orillia Tundras	MLH	12	0	0	0	18	—	—	—	—	—
NHL totals			2	0	0	0	2	—	—	—	—	—
