= 1984–85 OJHL season =

- League: Ontario Junior Hockey League
- Sport: Hockey
- Duration: Regular season 1984-09 – 1985-02; Playoffs; 1985-02 – 1985-04
- Teams: 8
- Finals champions: Orillia Travelways

OJHL seasons
- 1983–84 1985–86

The 1984–85 OJHL season is the 13th season of the Ontario Junior Hockey League (OJHL). The eight teams of the league played a 48-game season. The all eight teams made the playoffs.

The winner of the OJHL playoffs, the Orillia Travelways, were already hosting the 1985 Centennial Cup and were therefore exempted from the Buckland Cup/Dudley Hewitt Cup series against the Northern Ontario Junior Hockey League champion. Instead, the league finalists, the Aurora Tigers were granted the option of playing for the OHA and Central Canadian Championship. Both the Tigers and Travelways ended up at the Centennial Cup, which the Travelways won.

== Changes ==
- Whitby Lawmen join the OJHL.
- Hamilton Mountain A's leave the OJHL.
- North York Rangers become the North York Red Wings.

== Final standings ==
Note: GP = Games played; W = Wins; L = Losses; OTL = Overtime losses; SL = Shootout losses; GF = Goals for; GA = Goals against; PTS = Points; x = clinched playoff berth; y = clinched division title; z = clinched conference title

Teams
Team	GP	W	L	T	GF	GA	P
Orillia Travelways	48	39	7	2	346	168	80
Aurora Tigers	48	34	11	3	358	210	71
Newmarket Flyers	48	26	17	5	304	255	57
Dixie Beehives	48	25	18	5	263	235	55
Markham Waxers	48	20	25	3	229	263	43
Richmond Hill Dynes	48	18	27	3	230	267	39
North York Red Wings	48	10	37	1	185	332	21
Whitby Lawmen	48	8	38	2	181	374	18

== 1984-85 OJHL Playoffs ==
Quarter-final

Orillia Travelways defeated Whitby Lawmen 4-games-to-1
Aurora Tigers defeated North York Red Wings 4-games-to-none
Newmarket Flyers defeated Richmond Hill Dynes 4-games-to-2
Markham Waxers defeated Dixie Beehives 4-games-to-1

Semi-final

Aurora Tigers defeated Newmarket Flyers 4-games-to-3
Orillia Travelways defeated Markham Waxers 4-games-to-none

Final

Orillia Travelways defeated Aurora Tigers 4-games-to-none

== OHA Buckland Cup/Dudley Hewitt Cup Championship ==
The 1985 Buckland Cup and Dudley Hewitt Cup was a best-of-7 series between the Sudbury Cubs (NOJHL) and the Aurora Tigers. The Tigers played because the Orillia Travelways were granted an opt-out as hosts of the 1985 Centennial Cup. The winner moved on to the 1985 Centennial Cup with Orillia.

Aurora Tigers defeated Sudbury Cubs 4-games-to-none

Aurora 12 - Sudbury 5
Aurora 7 - Sudbury 2
Aurora 9 - Sudbury 4
Aurora 6 - Sudbury 2

== 1985 Centennial Cup Championship ==
The 1985 Centennial Cup was the Canadian National Junior A championship in Orillia, Ontario, hosted by the Orillia Travelways. The Orillia Travelways won the event, while the Aurora Tigers lost the semi-final.

Round Robin

Orillia Travelways defeated Cole Harbour Colts (MVJHL) 8-1
Aurora Tigers defeated Penticton Knights (BCJHL) 8-4
Orillia Travelways defeated Aurora Tigers 11-3
Cole Harbour Colts (MVJHL) defeated Aurora Tigers 7-5
Orillia Travelways defeated Penticton Knights (BCJHL) 6-3

Semi-final

Penticton Knights (BCJHL) defeated Aurora Tigers 8-5

Final

Orillia Travelways defeated Penticton Knights (BCJHL) 4-2

== Leading Scorers ==
Player	Team	GP	G	A	Pts
Scott Kerr	Newmarket Flyers	47	61	99	130
Jim Mayne	Aurora Tigers	42	45	62	107

== Players taken in the 1985 NHL entry draft ==
- Rd 6 #112 Brian McReynolds - New York Rangers (Orillia Travelways)
- Rd 6 #123 Danton Cole - Winnipeg Jets (Aurora Tigers)
- Rd 10 #200 Brad Hamilton - Chicago Blackhawks (Aurora Tigers)

== See also ==
- 1985 Centennial Cup
- Dudley Hewitt Cup
- List of OJHL seasons
- Northern Ontario Junior Hockey League
- Central Junior A Hockey League
- Thunder Bay Flyers

Preceded by 1983–84 OJHL season	Ontario Hockey Association; Junior A Seasons	Succeeded by 1985–86 OJHL season
