= Scott McLellan =

Canadian ice hockey player

- Born: February 10, 1963 (age 62) Toronto, Ontario, Canada
- Height: 6 ft 0 in (183 cm)
- Weight: 174 lb (79 kg; 12 st 6 lb)
- Position: Right wing
- Shot: Right
- Played for: Boston Bruins
- NHL draft: 77th overall, 1981; Boston Bruins
- Playing career: 1982–1985

Daniel Scott McLellan (born February 10, 1963) is a Canadian former professional ice hockey player who played two games in the National Hockey League with the Boston Bruins during the 1982–83 season, on December 4 and 5, 1982. The rest of his playing career, which lasted from 1982 to 1985, was mainly spent in the American Hockey League.

As a youth, McLellan played in the 1975 and 1976 Quebec International Pee-Wee Hockey Tournaments with minor ice hockey teams from Toronto.

McLellan was a Boston Bruins scout from 1994 to 1999.

For 18 years, Scott was V.P. Sales & Marketing at Tridel Corporation. He is currently Senior V.P. at Plazacorp, Toronto, one of Canada's leading condominium developers.

== Career statistics ==
=== Regular season and playoffs ===
			Regular season					Playoffs
Season	Team	League	GP	G	A	Pts	PIM	GP	G	A	Pts	PIM
1979–80	St. Michael's Buzzers	MJBHL	41	43	48	91	—	—	—	—	—	—
1980–81	Niagara Falls Flyers	OHL	33	7	4	11	39	12	1	0	1	2
1981–82	Niagara Falls Flyers	OHL	12	1	6	7	33	—	—	—	—	—
1981–82	Peterborough Petes	OHL	46	20	31	51	42	6	1	2	3	10
1982–83	Peterborough Petes	OHL	65	43	58	101	38	4	2	2	4	2
1982–83	Boston Bruins	NHL	2	0	0	0	0	—	—	—	—	—
1983–84	Toledo Goaldiggers	IHL	5	1	2	3	0	—	—	—	—	—
1983–84	Hershey Bears	AHL	73	9	12	21	14	—	—	—	—	—
1984–85	Hershey Bears	AHL	47	12	12	24	32	—	—	—	—	—
AHL totals			120	21	24	45	46	—	—	—	—	—
NHL totals			2	0	0	0	0	—	—	—	—	—
