= 1986–87 OJHL season =

- League: Ontario Junior Hockey League
- Sport: Hockey
- Duration: Regular season 1986-09 – 1987-02; Playoffs; 1987-02 – 1987-04
- Number of teams: 4
- Finals champions: Owen Sound Greys

OJHL seasons
- ← 1985–86

The 1986–87 OJHL season is the 15th and final season of the Ontario Junior Hockey League (OJHL). The four teams of the league played an interlocking 44-game season with the Northern Ontario Junior Hockey League. All four teams made the playoffs.

The winner of the OJHL playoffs, the Owen Sound Greys, failed to win the 1987 Buckland Cup for the OHA championship. The league folded in the summer of 1987. Owen Sound returned to the Midwestern Junior B Hockey League, while the Richmond Hill Dynes, Markham Waxers, and Aurora Eagles all dropped to the Central Junior B Hockey League. The dormant Orillia Terriers and Newmarket Flyers also jumped to the Central Jr. B league for 1987-88.

== Changes ==
- Aurora Eagles return from one-year hiatus.
- Orillia Terriers and Newmarket Flyers take one-year hiatus.
- Dixie Beehives leave OJHL.
- OJHL folds at the end of the season.

== Final standings ==
Note: GP = Games played; W = Wins; L = Losses; OTL = Overtime losses; SL = Shootout losses; GF = Goals for; GA = Goals against; PTS = Points; x = clinched playoff berth; y = clinched division title; z = clinched conference title

Teams
| Team | GP | W | L | T | GF | GA | P |
| Owen Sound Greys | 42 | 26 | 12 | 4 | 263 | 211 | 56 |
| Aurora Eagles | 44 | 25 | 15 | 4 | 270 | 225 | 54 |
| Richmond Hill Dynes | 43 | 19 | 17 | 7 | 210 | 200 | 45 |
| Markham Waxers | 43 | 14 | 22 | 7 | 210 | 231 | 35 |

== 1986-87 OJHL Playoffs ==
=== Semi-final ===
- Owen Sound Greys defeated Markham Waxers 4-games-to-1
- Aurora Eagles defeated Richmond Hill Dynes 4-games-to-2

=== Final ===
- Owen Sound Greys defeated Aurora Eagles 4-games-to-none

== OHA Buckland Cup Championship ==
The 1987 Buckland Cup was a best-of-7 series between the Nickel Centre Power Trains (NOJHL) and the Owen Sound Greys. The winner moved on to the 1987 Dudley Hewitt Cup Final Series.

Nickel Centre Power Trains (NOJHL) defeated Owen Sound Greys 4-games-to-2

Nickel Centre 8 - Owen Sound 7
Owen Sound 7 - Nickel Centre 0
Owen Sound 7 - Nickel Centre 6
Nickel Centre 7 - Owen Sound 5
Nickel Centre 7 - Owen Sound 4
Nickel Centre 5 - Owen Sound 2

== Leading Scorers ==
| Player / Team / GP / G / A / Pts; Paul Jackson / Aurora Eagles / 35 / 48 / 54 / 102 |

== See also ==
- 1987 Centennial Cup
- Dudley Hewitt Cup
- List of OJHL seasons
- Northern Ontario Junior Hockey League
- Central Junior A Hockey League
- Thunder Bay Flyers
- 1986 in ice hockey
- 1987 in ice hockey

| Preceded by 1985–86 OJHL season | Ontario Hockey Association; Junior A Seasons | Succeeded by OJHL dissolved |
