= 1983–84 OJHL season =

- League: Ontario Junior Hockey League
- Sport: Hockey
- Duration: Regular season 1983-09 – 1984-02; Playoffs; 1984-02 – 1984-04
- Teams: 8
- Finals champions: Orillia Travelways

OJHL seasons
- 1982–83 1984–85

The 1983–84 OJHL season is the 12th season of the Ontario Junior Hockey League (OJHL). The eight teams of the league played a 42-game season. The all eight teams made the playoffs.

The winner of the OJHL playoffs, the Orillia Travelways, won the OHA Buckland Cup and then the Dudley Hewitt Cup as Central Canadian champions. In 1984, the Callaghan Cup champion from the east did not compete in the National playdowns, so the Travelways gained a direct berth into the 1984 Centennial Cup. The Travelways failed to win the Centennial Cup.

== Changes ==
- OJHL reverts from two-division system to a single, non-partitioned standings.
- Richmond Hill Rams become the Richmond Hill Dynes.
- Cambridge Winterhawks leave OJHL for MWJHL.

== Final standings ==
Note: GP = Games played; W = Wins; L = Losses; OTL = Overtime losses; SL = Shootout losses; GF = Goals for; GA = Goals against; PTS = Points; x = clinched playoff berth; y = clinched division title; z = clinched conference title

Teams
Team	GP	W	L	T	GF	GA	P
Dixie Beehives	42	27	10	5	269	182	61
Orillia Travelways	42	25	13	4	280	196	54
North York Rangers	42	22	17	3	252	207	47
Newmarket Flyers	42	20	16	6	247	239	46
Markham Waxers	42	18	19	5	228	199	41
Hamilton Mountain A's	42	16	18	8	187	191	40
Richmond Hill Dynes	42	16	21	5	203	246	37
Aurora Tigers	42	4	34	4	168	370	12

== 1983-84 OJHL Playoffs ==
Quarter-final

Dixie Beehives defeated Aurora Tigers 4-games-to-none
Orillia Travelways defeated Markham Waxers 4-games-to-none
North York Rangers defeated Richmond Hill Rams 4-games-to-2
Newmarket Flyers defeated Hamilton Mountain A's 4-games-to-none

Semi-final

Orillia Travelways defeated North York Rangers 4-games-to-none
Dixie Beehives defeated Newmarket Flyers 4-games-to-3

Final

Orillia Travelways defeated Dixie Beehives 4-games-to-1

== OHA Buckland Cup Championship ==
The 1984 Buckland Cup was a best-of-5 series between the Rayside-Balfour Canadians (NOJHL) and the Orillia Travelways. The winner moved on to the 1984 Dudley Hewitt Cup.

Orillia Travelways defeated Rayside-Balfour Canadians (NOJHL) 3-games-to-1

Orillia 8 - Rayside-Balfour 7 OT
Orillia 8 - Rayside-Balfour 1
Rayside-Balfour 7 - Orillia 6
Orillia 4 - Rayside-Balfour 3

== Dudley Hewitt Cup Championship ==
The 1984 Dudley Hewitt Cup was a best-of-7 series between the Pembroke Lumber Kings (CJHL) and the Orillia Travelways. The winner moved on to the 1984 Centennial Cup.

Orillia Travelways defeated Pembroke Lumber Kings (CJHL) 4-games-to-none

Orillia 9 - Pembroke 5
Orillia 12 - Pembroke 5
Orillia 4 - Pembroke 2
Orillia 8 - Pembroke 3

== 1984 Centennial Cup Championship ==
The 1984 Centennial Cup was the best-of-7 Canadian National Junior A championship series between the Eastern Champion Orillia Travelways and the Western Abbott Cup champion Weyburn Red Wings (SJHL).

Weyburn Red Wings (SJHL) defeated Orillia Travelways 4-games-to-3

Orillia 6 - Weyburn 5
Weyburn 6 - Orillia 4
Weyburn 7 - Orillia 4
Orillia 2 - Weyburn 1
Orillia 8 - Weyburn 5
Weyburn 5 - Orillia 4
Weyburn 3 - Orillia 0

== Leading Scorers ==
Player / Team / GP / G / A / Pts; Tony Hrkac / Orillia Travelways / 42 / 52 / 54 / 106

== Players taken in the 1984 NHL entry draft ==
- Rd 2 #32 Tony Hrkac - St. Louis Blues (Orillia Travelways)
- Rd 10 #196 Tom Tilley - St. Louis Blues (Orillia Travelways)

== See also ==
- 1984 Centennial Cup
- Dudley Hewitt Cup
- List of Ontario Hockey Association Junior A seasons
- Thunder Bay Junior A Hockey League
- Northern Ontario Junior Hockey League
- Central Junior A Hockey League
- 1983 in ice hockey
- 1984 in ice hockey

Preceded by 1982–83 OJHL season	Ontario Hockey Association; Junior A Seasons	Succeeded by 1984–85 OJHL season
