= Ajax Merchants =

- City: Ajax, Ontario
- League: Ontario Provincial Junior A Hockey League
- Home arena: Ajax Community Centre
- Colours: Black, Red, and White

Franchise history
- ? - 1965: Whitby Dunlops
- 1965 - 1972: Whitby Steelers
- 1972 - 1973: Ajax Steelers
- 1973 - 1975: Whitby Knob Hill Farms
- 1975 - 1976: Ajax Knob Hill Farms
- 1976 - 1977: Ajax Merchants

The Ajax Merchants are a defunct Tier II Junior "A" ice hockey team from Ajax, Ontario, Canada. They were a part of the Ontario Provincial Junior A Hockey League.

== History ==
This Ajax franchise, much like its ancestor the Ajax Attack, was not known for its success. The Steelers/Knob Hill Farms/Merchants tried different names, sponsors, and even tried a scenery change in the neighbouring town of Whitby, Ontario. With only one winning season in five years, the team disbanded in 1977.

== Season-by-season results ==
Season	GP	W	L	T	OTL	GF	GA	P	Results	Playoffs
Whitby Steelers
1970-71	44	14	24	6	-	162	185	34	10th Metro B	
Whitby-Ajax Steelers
1971-72	44	4	35	5	-	106	233	13	12th Metro B	
Ajax Steelers
1972-73	44	20	22	2	-	196	214	42	7th OPJHL	
Whitby Knob Hill Farms
1973-74	44	11	28	5	-	167	271	27	11th OPJHL	
1974-75	44	21	17	6	-	205	172	48	6th OPJHL	
Ajax Knob Hill Farms
1975-76	44	18	19	7	-	201	208	43	5th OPJHL	
Ajax Merchants
1976-77	44	15	24	5	-	206	228	35	10th OPJHL	

=== Playoffs ===
- 1973 Lost quarter-final

Richmond Hill Rams defeated Ajax Steelers

- 1974 DNQ
- 1975 Lost quarter-final

North York Rangers defeated Whitby Knob Hill Farms

- 1976 Lost quarter-final

North York Rangers defeated Ajax Knob Hill Farms

- 1977 DNQ
