= Ontario Provincial Junior A Hockey League (1972–1987) =

Former junior ice hockey league in Ontario

Ontario Provincial Junior "A" Hockey League
- Association: Ontario Hockey Association
- Founded: 1972
- Folded: 1987
- Last champion: Owen Sound Greys (1987)

The Ontario Provincial Junior A Hockey League (OPJHL) was a Canadian Junior ice hockey league based in Ontario and sanctioned by the Ontario Hockey Association and the Canadian Amateur Hockey Association. The league operated from 1972 until 1987. This league was the forerunner to the current Ontario Provincial Junior A Hockey League that was promoted in 1993. From 1972 until 1977, the OPJHL shared their region with the Southern Ontario Junior A Hockey League.

== History ==
The Ontario Hockey Association Tier II Junior "A" League was born out of the creation of the Ontario Hockey League. There have always been multiple tiers of junior hockey, but the top tier, then known as Ontario Hockey Association Junior "A", elected to split from the OHA and create its own level of hockey. The early 1970s sparked a vast reorganization of Canadian hockey across the country. The Ontario Hockey League was born out of this, as well was the Western Hockey League and the Quebec Major Junior Hockey League in other parts of Canada. The new tier was known as Major Junior "A" hockey. The first Ontario Tier II League came in 1968 with creation of the renegade Western Ontario Junior A Hockey League, which became the Southern Ontario Junior A Hockey League in 1970.

The aftermath of the annexation of the top tier left a vacuum for a new top tier of OHA hockey. What filled the gap in 1972 was the 12-team Ontario Hockey Association Jr. "A" Hockey League, which comprised five teams leaving the Metro Junior "B" (the Richmond Hill Rams, North York Rangers, Downsview Beavers, Aurora Tigers and the Dixie Beehives), 6 expansion teams (Seneca Flyers, Ajax Steelers, Wexford Warriors, Vaughan Nationals, Weston Dodgers), the Kingston Frontenacs of the defunct Eastern Junior B Hockey League, and the North Bay Trappers of the recently folded Northern Ontario Junior Hockey League.

The Ontario Provincial league's only competition for talent in Southern Ontario was the Southern Ontario Junior A Hockey League. The Southern Ontario League jumped to Junior "A" in 1968 as the Western Ontario Junior A Hockey League and changed its name two years later. From the 1972–73 season until the 1976–77 season, these two leagues put their champions up against each other to earn the right to compete for the Dudley Hewitt Cup as only one Ontario Hockey Association team could challenge for it. In 1973, the SOJAHL's Chatham Maroons defeated the OPJHL's Wexford Raiders 4-games-to-3. In 1974, the Wexford Raiders got their turn, defeating the Windsor Spitfires 4-games-to-3 to even the series. A year later, the SOJAHL's Guelph CMC's defeated the Toronto Nationals 4-games-to-2 and in 1976 became the Guelph Platers and defeated the North Bay Trappers 4-games-to-1 to win their second straight OHA Championship. The final chapter of this saga was slightly redemptive for the OPJHL as their North York Rangers went the distance and defeated Guelph 4-games-to-3. Down to four teams, the SOJAHL folded. The Guelph Platers and Hamilton Mountain A's jumped to the OPJHL, while the Owen Sound Greys took a season off then joined the Georgian Bay Intermediate A Hockey League and the Collingwood Blues changed their name and dropped to Junior C. After a five-year feud, the SOJAHL won the battle but lost the war as their champions won three of five OHA Championships but ultimately folded.

Over the next few years, the Guelph Platers, Belleville Bulls, and Kingston Frontenacs, began in this league before jumping to the Ontario Hockey League.

By 1986, the league was suffering from a variety of difficulties. With most of their teams folding or dropping to Junior "B", the league was left with 4 teams , the OHA Jr. "A" League was forced to close its doors at the end of the 1986–87 season. The four remaining teams at the end of the OHA Jr. "A" League era were the Final Champion Owen Sound Greys, the Aurora Eagles, the Markham Waxers, and the Richmond Hill Dynes. The Central League agreed to take Markham, Aurora and Richmond Hill, while the Owen Sound Greys went to the Midwestern Junior B Hockey League.

== Member teams ==
Former OJHL Teams
| Team | Centre | Joined | Exited | Status |
| Ajax Merchants | Ajax, Ontario | 1972 | 1977 | Folded |
| Aurora Tigers | Aurora, Ontario | 1972 | 1987 | Joined CJBHL |
| Belleville Bulls | Belleville, Ontario | 1979 | 1981 | Joined OHL |
| Brampton Warriors | Brampton, Ontario | 1980 | 1982 | Folded |
| Cambridge Winterhawks | Cambridge, Ontario | 1982 | 1983 | Joined MWJHL |
| Dixie Beehives | Dixie, Ontario | 1972 | 1986 | Folded |
| Guelph Platers | Guelph, Ontario | 1977 | 1982 | Joined OHL |
| Hamilton Mountain A's | Hamilton, Ontario | 1977 | 1984 | Folded |
| Kingston Frontenacs | Kingston, Ontario | 1972 | 1973 | Joined OHL |
| Markham Waxers | Markham, Ontario | 1973 | 1987 | Joined CJBHL |
| Newmarket Flyers | Newmarket, Ontario | 1972 | 1986 | Joined CJBHL |
| North Bay Trappers | North Bay, Ontario | 1972 | 1982 | Folded |
| North York Rangers | Toronto, Ontario | 1972 | 1985 | Folded |
| Orillia Travelways | Orillia, Ontario | 1981 | 1986 | Joined CJBHL |
| Owen Sound Greys | Owen Sound, Ontario | 1985 | 1987 | Joined MWJHL |
| Richmond Hill Rams | Richmond Hill, Ontario | 1972 | 1987 | Joined CJBHL |
| Royal York Royals | Toronto, Ontario | 1972 | 1980 | Folded |
| Toronto Nationals | Vaughan, Ontario | 1972 | 1977 | Folded |
| Weston Dodgers | Toronto, Ontario | 1972 | 1977 | Folded |
| Wexford Raiders | Scarborough, Ontario | 1972 | 1981 | Folded |
| Whitby Lawmen | Whitby, Ontario | 1984 | 1985 | Folded |

== Champions ==
=== League ===
- 1987 Owen Sound Greys
- 1986 Orillia Travelways
- 1985 Orillia Travelways
- 1984 Orillia Travelways
- 1983 North York Rangers
- 1982 Guelph Platers
- 1981 Belleville Bulls
- 1980 North York Rangers
- 1979 Guelph Platers
- 1978 Guelph Platers
- 1977 North York Rangers
- 1976 North Bay Trappers
- 1975 Toronto Nationals
- 1974 Wexford Raiders
- 1973 Wexford Raiders

=== Dudley Hewitt Cup ===
- 1986 Orillia Travelways
- 1985 Orillia Travelways
- 1984 Orillia Travelways
- 1983 North York Rangers
- 1982 Guelph Platers
- 1981 Belleville Bulls
- 1980 North York Rangers
- 1979 Guelph Platers
- 1978 Guelph Platers
- 1974 Wexford Raiders

=== Manitoba Centennial Cup ===
- 1985 Orillia Travelways
- 1983 North York Rangers
- 1978 Guelph Platers

== League records ==
- Best record: 1981-82 Guelph Platers (40-4-6)
- Worst record: 1979-80 Richmond Hill Rams (4-39-1)
- Most goals, one season: Steve Thomas (68) -- 1981-82 Markham Waxers
- Most assists, one season: Adam Oates (105) -- 1981-82 Markham Waxers
- Most points, one season: Adam Oates (159) -- 1981-82 Markham Waxers
