= Metro Junior A Hockey League =

Junior level ice hockey league

Metro Junior "A" Hockey League
- Association: Ontario Hockey Association
- Founded: 1950
- Folded: 1998
- Last champion: Wexford Raiders (1998)

The Metro Junior "A" Hockey League was a junior level ice hockey league based out of Southern Ontario. The league originated in 1956 as the Metro Junior "B" Hockey League, which lasted until 1991, when it changed its designation from Junior B to Junior A. It remained a Jr. A league from 1991 until 1998 when it was absorbed by the Ontario Provincial Junior A Hockey League.

== History ==
The teams that formed the Metropolitan league played in the Big Six Junior B league in 1950 until 1953, when a new, nine-member OHA Jr.B league was formed. The league officially took on the Metropolitan Toronto junior hockey league name in 1956. For some time, was a part of the Ontario Hockey Association and the Canadian Junior A Hockey League. As the name suggests, the league originally consisted of Junior B teams in the Toronto area. However, over time, with the defection of teams to the Junior A league, the Metro league accepted teams from wider regions. The league featured many future NHL stars, including Brad Park (Toronto Westclairs), Wayne Gretzky (Toronto Nationals), Eric Lindros (St. Michael's Buzzers), Dale Hawerchuk (Oshawa Legionaires), Ken Dryden (Etobicoke Indians), and Curtis Joseph (King City Dukes).

During the early years, the "Junior B" league was essentially the minor league feeder for the "Junior A" Ontario Hockey Association. Almost all of the Metro players eventually moved on to play in the OHA. Following the NCAA's 1980 rule change that deemed any OHL players to be professionals, amateur leagues such as the Junior B leagues grew. The Metro league became a key feeder to college hockey programs during the 1980s and 1990s, producing more than 200 future NCAA players.

=== The early Junior B years ===
The early years featured Toronto-based teams such as the St.Mike's Buzzers, Dixie Beehives, Toronto Lakeshore Bruins, Toronto Marlies/Weston Dukes, Unionville Jets, Aurora Tigers, Whitby Dunlops, Leaside Rangers, Brampton 7Ups and the Woodbridge Dodgers. For the most part, the teams served as farm teams at the Junior B level for the Junior A OHA teams. The 1964–65 season starred a 17-year-old Ken Dryden in net for the Etobicoke Indians. With Dryden in net, the Indians won the Metro league title and made it all the way to the Sutherland Cup final where they lost 4-games-to-2 to the Kitchener Greenshirts. Ken Dryden moved on to become one of the most famous NHL goaltenders of all-time. He played in the 1972 Summit Series, won the 1971 Conn Smythe Trophy as playoff MVP a season before he was officially a rookie (which he won the Calder Memorial Trophy in 1972 as Rookie of the Year), he won six Stanley Cups, and is a Hockey Hall of Fameer.

=== Exodus 1972 ===
In 1972 the Metro B league was reshaped substantially when six members left to join the new Ontario Provincial Junior A league. Metro members Ajax Steelers, Aurora Tigers, Dixie Beehives, Downsview Bees, North York Rangers, and the Richmond Hill Rams left. A year later the Markham Waxers also left. To make up for the losses, the Metro league took in new members Belleville Bobcats and the Peterborough Lions from the folded Eastern Ontario Junior B Hockey League, and expanded with the Oshawa Legionaires, Bramalea Blues, Pickering Panthers, and Wexford Warriors. The Etobicoke Selects, Toronto Red Wings, and Markham Waxers joined in 1973. The Kingston Voyageurs entered the league in 1974.

In 1974, the Metro Champion Bramalea Blues defeated the Owen Sound Greys 4-games-to-3 to reach the Sutherland Cup All-Ontario Final. Upon reaching the final, the Blues defeated the Hamilton Red Wings of the Niagara & District Junior B Hockey League in Game 1, only to have a brawl involving the teams, officials, and fans breakout to the point that police were called to break up the incident. Due to the brawl, the Blues withdrew from the final and became the only team in Ontario Hockey Association history to forfeit the Sutherland Cup.

The 1975 season marked the first junior appearance by a 14-year-old "underage" Wayne Gretzky for the Toronto Nationals. In September, Walter Gretzky had Wayne moved to the City of Vaughan to play midget hockey for the Toronto Young Nats instead of playing in his hometown of Brantford, Ontario. In October, the Canadian Amateur Hockey Association declared Gretzky and 15-year-old Brian Rorabek ineligible because they had established residency too late. Gretzky sued in the Canadian Courts and lost . Because Gretzky could remain in Toronto to play junior (rather than midget hockey), Gretzky tried out for the Junior B team, and made the team. In 28 games, Gretzky scored 27 goals and 33 assists to win Metro Rookie of the Year honours. The next year the team moved to Richmond Hill and became the Seneca Nationals. Gretzky scored 36 goals and 36 assists in 32 games, and then 40 goals and 35 assists in 23 playoff games to lead his team to a Metro Junior "B" Championship. The team came up short of a Sutherland Cup victory, as the Nationals were stopped dead in the 1977 All-Ontario Semi-final by the Stratford Cullitons of the Wellington-Waterloo Junior B Hockey League.

The Henry Carr Crusaders, a team sponsored by the Toronto highschool, joined the Junior "B" ranks in 1980. They won league titles in 1983, 1984, and 1987. Their best season came in 1983, where they went undefeated during the regular season, won the Metro, and then went on to win the Sutherland Cup as All-Ontario Junior "B" Champions. That team featured future NHLers Bob Essensa, Paul Cavallini and Victor Posa and NHL draft picks Rob Bryden and Allister Brown. In 1991, Henry Carr Highschool dropped its sponsorship of the team, and as of 2006 were known as the Toronto Thunderbirds.

During the 1986–87, a strange occurrence happened with the team that is now known as the Mississauga Chargers. Then known as the King City Dukes and in their third season in King since moving from Weston, the team moved mid-season to North York and renamed itself the North York Civics. The oddity here is that teams rarely do a complete locational move in the middle of a season. The next year they became the Richmond Hill Dukes and skipped around the Greater Toronto Area for the better part of the next decade trying to find a home.

During the 1988–89 season Kingston's Scott Martin won his second consecutive scoring title and League MVP award. His season totals of 62 goals and 114 points in a mere 42 games came closest to topping the league records set by NHLers Patrick Flatley during the 1980–81 season (137 points for Henry Carr), and Paul Gardner during the 1973–74 season (77 goals and 132 points for St.Mike's).

=== 1990 departure from CJAHL and move to Junior A ===
The league was classified by the OHA as a Junior B league, until a falling-out in June 1990, when the Ontario Hockey Federation was formed, comprising the OHA, the Ontario major junior league, three minor hockey groups and women's hockey. The OHA was given jurisdiction over junior hockey below major junior excluding junior A in the north. Junior teams in Toronto were not members of the OHA and therefore not members of the CAHA. As a result, in 1990 the Metro league declared itself to be an independent junior league. A year later, during the summer of 1991, the league declared itself to be a Junior A league, and hired a full-time commissioner, Don Linthwaite.

The Metro League's move brought into motion changes that ultimately led to the creation of the Ontario Provincial Junior Hockey League. After the Metro league declared itself to be a Junior A league, the Central Junior B league followed, declaring itself a Junior A league after the 1992–93 season. Through November 19–21, 1993, the new junior A leagues joined with teams from the other Canadian provincial junior A leagues, and formed the Canadian Junior A Hockey League.

=== Exodus 1995 ===
In 1995, crisis struck the Metro Junior A Hockey League. In the midst of perceived corruption by the league, five teams walked out on the Metro. Four of these teams, the Bramalea Blues, Kingston Voyageurs, Mississauga Chargers, and St. Michael's Buzzers, fled to join the Ontario Provincial Junior A Hockey League (OPJHL). The Richmond Hill Riot folded.

The Metro Junior A Hockey League operated independent from the Ontario Hockey Association (OHA) as of the 1995–96 season, when it was opposed to a ruling by the Canadian Amateur Hockey Association which gave jurisdiction over junior ice hockey in the province to the OHA. The Metro Junior A Hockey League insisted on its own administration and was opposed to paying fees to the OHA. The Metro Junior A Hockey League rejoined the OHA in 1997, then merged into the OPJHL in 1998.

Hockey history was made on February 21, 1997 when Ryan Venturelli of the Muskoka Bears became the first goaltender in hockey history to score two goals (both empty net) in a hockey game against the Durham Huskies.

Despite extensive expansion, the league was not able to retain its past glory and was swallowed whole by the OPJHL in 1998. The Metro league folded, with most of its teams being taken in by the OPJHL, as well as many of its players. So far the most successful of these teams seem to be the Aurora Tigers, who after winning the OPJHL and Dudley Hewitt Cup in 2004, they took home the Royal Bank Cup 2004 as CJAHL National Champions as well. The league produced numerous stars, both in the NHL and as a feeder for NCAA college hockey, having produced 350 NCAA Division I scholarship athletes from 1980 to 1998.

== Teams ==
Team	Centre	Years	Status
Ajax Steelers	Ajax	19xx-1972	Folded
Aurora Tigers	Aurora	1967–1972; 1992–1997	Joined OPJHL; Joined OPJHL
Belleville Bobcats	Belleville	1972–1989	Merged w/ Wellington
Bramalea Blues	Bramalea	1972–1995	Joined OPJHL
Caledon Canadians	Caledon	1994–1998	Joined OPJHL
Dixie Beehives	Mississauga	1956–1972	Folded
Downsview Bees	North York	1971–1972	Folded
Durham Huskies	Durham	1996–1998	Joined OPJHL
Etobicoke Indians	Etobicoke	196x-1970	Folded
Etobicoke Selects	Etobicoke	1973–1980	Folded
Huntsville Wildcats	Huntsville	1990–1998	Joined OPJHL
Kingston Voyageurs	Kingston	1974–1995	Joined OPJHL
Markham Waxers	Markham	1962–1973; 1995–1998	Joined OPJHL; Joined OPJHL
Mimico Monarchs	Etobicoke	1989–1995	Folded
Mississauga Chargers	Mississauga	1992–1995	Joined OPJHL
Niagara Scenic	West Seneca	1995–1998	Joined OPJHL
North York Rangers (I)	North York	1967–1972	Joined OPJHL
North York Rangers (II)	North York	1992–1998	Joined OPJHL
Oshawa Legionaires	Oshawa	1972–1998	Joined OPJHL
Peterborough Lions	Peterborough	1972–1989	Joined CJBHL
Pickering Panthers	Pickering	1972–1998	Joined OPJHL
Pittsburgh Jr. Penguins	Pittsburgh	1997–1998	Joined EmpJHL
Port Credit Titans	Port Credit	1979–1987	Folded
Port Hope Buzzards	Port Hope	1996–1998	Joined OPJHL
Quinte Hawks	Deseronto	1996–1998	Joined OPJHL
Scarborough Sabres	Scarborough	1970–1972	Folded
Scarborough Young Bruins	Scarborough	1976–1979	Folded
St. Michael's Buzzers	Toronto	1956–1995	Joined OPJHL
Shelburne Wolves	Shelburne	1995–1998	Joined OPJHL
Syracuse Jr. Crunch	Syracuse	1995–1998	Joined OPJHL
Thornhill Rattlers	Thornhill	1989–1998	Joined OPJHL
Toronto Nationals	Toronto	1970–1980	Folded
Toronto Red Wings	Toronto	1973–1979	Folded
Wellington Dukes	Wellington	1989–1998	Joined OPJHL
Weston Dodgers	Weston	1956–1972	Joined OPJHL
Wexford Raiders	Wexford	1972–1998	Joined OPJHL

== Champions ==
Please note: On the chart, the bolded team is the league champion.

Year	Champion	Finalist
1951	**Weston Dukes**	Brampton Regents
1952	**Weston Dukes**	St. Michael's Buzzers
1953	**Weston Dukes**	Brampton Regents
1954	**Weston Dukes**	St. Michael's Buzzers
1955	**Woodbridge Dodgers**	Brampton Regents
1956	**Brampton Regents**	Weston Dukes
1957	**St. Michael's Buzzers**	Dixie Beehives
1958	**Lakeshore Bruins**	Dixie Beehives
1959	**Aurora Bears**	West Toronto Dukes
1960	**Toronto Marlboros**	Woodbridge Dodgers
1961	**St. Michael's Buzzers**	Weston Dukes
1962	**Woodbridge Dodgers**	
1963	**Lakeshore Goodyears**	Weston Dodgers
1964	**Weston Dodgers**	Neil McNeil Maroons
1965	**Etobicoke Indians**	Brampton 7-Ups
1966	**Toronto Westclairs**	Etobicoke Indians
1967	**Dixie Beehives**	Weston Dodgers
1968	**Markham Waxers**	St. Michael's Buzzers
1969	**Markham Waxers**	
1970	**Dixie Beehives**	North York Rangers
1971	**Dixie Beehives**	
1972	**Markham Waxers**	
1973	**Toronto Nationals**	
1974	**Bramalea Blues**	
Year	Central	Eastern
1975	**Bramalea Blues**	
1976	Bramalea Blues	**Belleville Bobcats**
1977	**Seneca Nationals**	Oshawa Legionaires
1978	St. Michael's Buzzers	**Oshawa Legionaires**
1979	St. Michael's Buzzers	**Oshawa Legionaires**
1980	St. Michael's Buzzers	**Belleville Bobcats**
1981	**St. Michael's Buzzers**	Pickering Panthers
1982	**St. Michael's Buzzers**	Oshawa Legionaires
Year	Fullan	MacKenzie
1983	**Henry Carr Crusaders**	Pickering Panthers
1984	**Henry Carr Crusaders**	Oshawa Legionaires
1985	**Bramalea Blues**	Peterborough Roadrunners
1986	Bramalea Blues	**Pickering Panthers**
1987	**Henry Carr Crusaders**	Pickering Panthers
1988	**Bramalea Blues**	Markham Travelways
1989	**St. Michael's Buzzers**	Kingston Voyageurs
Year	Bauer	Fullan
1990	Wexford Raiders	**Thornhill Thunderbirds**
1991	**Wexford Raiders**	Bramalea Blues
1992	**Wexford Raiders**	Bramalea Blues
1993	**Wexford Raiders**	St. Michael's Buzzers
1994	**Wexford Raiders**	Caledon Canadians
1995	Wexford Raiders	**Caledon Canadians**
Year	Eastern	Western
1996	Thornhill Islanders	**Caledon Canadians**

Year	Central	Eastern	Western
1997	Wexford Raiders	Quinte Hawks	**Aurora Tigers**
1998	**Wexford Raiders**	Syracuse Jr. Crunch*	Caledon Canadians

(*) denotes that there was no clear winner to the Eastern Division in 1998, but Syracuse did maintain a better record than Oshawa in the 1998 playoffs and is the closest the division has to a playoff champion.

=== Sutherland Cup Provincial Jr. B Champions ===
Year	Champion	Finalist
1952	Weston Dukes	Waterloo Siskins (WGr)
1953	Weston Dukes	Waterloo Siskins (WGr)
1957	Dixie Beehives	Sarnia Legionnaires (W)
1961	St. Michael's Buzzers	Owen Sound Greys (C)
1969	Markham Seal-a-Wax	Strathroy Rockets (C)
1970	Dixie Beehives	Hamilton Mountain Bees (ND)
1971	Dixie Beehives	Hamilton Mountain Bees (ND)
1972	Markham Waxers	St. Marys Lincolns (WO)
1975	Bramalea Blues	Oakville Blades (C)
1980	Belleville Bobcats	Windsor Bulldogs (WO)
1982	St. Michael's Buzzers	Sarnia Bees (WO)
1983	Henry Carr Crusaders	Stratford Cullitons (MW)
1989	St. Michael's Buzzers	Niagara Falls Canucks (GH)

== See also ==
1995–96 All-Star Game Puck

- List of ice hockey leagues
- Ontario Hockey Association
- Ontario Provincial Junior A Hockey League
- Royal Bank Cup
