= Eastern Junior B Hockey League =

The Eastern Junior B Hockey League (EJBHL) was a Junior "B" ice hockey league based in Eastern Ontario. They were sanctioned by the Ontario Hockey Association and Canadian Amateur Hockey Association, and competed for the All-Ontario Junior "B" title, the Sutherland Cup.

== History ==
In 1951, the Eastern Group of the Ontario Hockey Association Junior B grouping was segregated and named the Eastern Junior B Hockey League.

In 1960, the league consisted of entries from Peterborough, Whitby, Belleville, Kingston, Picton, and Cobourg. A year later, the EJBHL added Gananoque. From 1963 until 1965, the league dropped to two full-time members: Kingston and Peterborough. Belleville moonlit as a Junior C team in a Junior B league and the rest of the teams dropped to Junior C.

In 1965, Cobourg and Oshawa jumped on board with the league.

Although Trenton missed some time, the league consisted of Trenton, Peterborough, Belleville, Oshawa, Cobourg, and Kingston.

In 1972, the league was closed and divided between the original Ontario Provincial Junior A Hockey League and the Metro Junior B Hockey League. In 1973, the Kingston Frontenacs made the jump to the Ontario Major Junior Hockey League. The other five remaining teams are all one way or another members of the current Ontario Provincial Junior A Hockey League.

In their final years, the EJBHL was dominated by Peterborough, Kingston, and Oshawa. These three teams combined for the league's final nine championships.

== Teams ==
- Belleville Bobcats
- Cobourg Cougars
- Cobourg Rockets
- Gananoque Islanders
- Kingston Frontenacs
- Napanee Red Wings
- Oshawa Crushmen
- Peterborough Lions
- Picton Merchants
- Trenton Apple Kings
- Trenton Golden Hawks
- Whitby Hillcrests

== League Champions ==
- 1952 Belleville Snowmen
- 1953 Belleville Snowmen
- 1954 Kingston Frontenacs
- 1955 Peterborough Canucks
- 1956 Kingston Frontenacs
- 1957 Peterborough Canucks
- 1958 Peterborough Canucks
- 1959 Peterborough Canucks
- 1960 Peterborough Canucks
- 1961 Peterborough Canucks
- 1962 Belleville McFarlands
- 1963 Kingston Frontenacs
- 1964 Kingston Frontenacs
- 1965 Kingston Frontenacs
- 1966 Oshawa Crushmen
- 1967 Peterborough Lions
- 1968 Oshawa Crushmen
- 1969 Oshawa Crushmen
- 1970 Kingston Frontenacs
- 1971 Peterborough Lions
- 1972 Peterborough Lions
