= 1986 Centennial Cup =

Ice hockey tournament

1986 Manitoba Centennial Cup

Tournament details
- Venue: Cole Harbour, Nova Scotia
- Dates: May 1986
- Teams: 4

Final positions
- Champions: Penticton Knights (1st title)
- Runners-up: Cole Harbour Colts
- Third place: Orillia Travelways
- Fourth place: Moncton Hawks

Tournament statistics
- Games played: 8
- Scoring leader: Gary Thomas (Cole Harbour)

Awards
- MVP: Kevan Melrose (Penticton)

The 1986 Centennial Cup is the 16th Junior "A" 1986 ice hockey National Championship for the Canadian Junior A Hockey League.

The Centennial Cup was competed for by the winners of the Abbott Cup, Dudley Hewitt Cup, the Callaghan Cup, and a 'Host' team.

The tournament was hosted by the Cole Harbour Colts in the city of Cole Harbour, Nova Scotia.

A note of interest is that Troy Crosby, Sidney's father was the goaltender for the Moncton Hawks in this tournament. He ended up settling in Cole Harbour, NS which is Sidney's hometown.

== The Playoffs ==
=== Round Robin ===
Pos	League (Ticket)	Team	Pld	W	L	GF	GA	GD	Qualification
1	MVJHL (Host/Fred Page Cup)	Cole Harbour Colts	3	3	0	20	12	+8	Final
2	BCJHL (Abbott Cup)	Penticton Knights	3	2	1	16	11	+5	Semi-final
3	OJHL (Dudley Hewitt Cup)	Orillia Travelways	3	1	2	11	17	−6	Semi-final
4	MVJHL (-)	Moncton Midland Hawks	3	0	3	8	15	−7	

==== Results ====
Cole Harbour Colts defeated Penticton Knights 6-5
Orillia Travelways defeated Moncton Hawks 4-3
Cole Harbour Colts defeated Orillia Travelways 9-5
Penticton Knights defeated Moncton Hawks 6-3
Penticton Knights defeated Orillia Travelways 5-2
Cole Harbour Colts defeated Moncton Hawks 5-2

=== Semi-finals and Final ===
Semi-finals			Royal Bank Cup Finals
			1	Cole Harbour Colts	4
2	Penticton Knights	7	2	Penticton Knights	7
3	Orillia Travelways	3

== Awards ==
Most Valuable Player: Kevan Melrose (Penticton Knights)
Top Scorer: Gary Thomas (Cole Harbour Colts)
Most Sportsmanlike Player: David Shields (Penticton Knights)

=== All-Star Team ===
Forward

David Shields (Penticton Knights)
Dwight Lucas (Cole Harbour Colts)
Garry Thomas (Cole Harbour Colts)

Defence

Kevan Melrose (Penticton Knights)
Barry Harrietha (Cole Harbour Colts)

Goal

Corry Amato (Orillia Travelways)

== Roll of League Champions ==
AJHL: Calgary Canucks
BCJHL: Penticton Knights
CJHL: Brockville Braves
IJHL: Summerside Western Capitals
MJHL: Winnipeg South Blues
MVJHL: Cole Harbour Colts
NOJHL: Onaping Falls Huskies
OJHL: Orillia Travelways
PCJHL: Prince George Spruce Kings
SJHL: Humboldt Broncos

== See also ==
- Canadian Junior A Hockey League
- Royal Bank Cup
- Anavet Cup
- Doyle Cup
- Dudley Hewitt Cup
- Fred Page Cup
- Abbott Cup
- Mowat Cup
