= Scarborough Sabres =

- City: Scarborough, Ontario
- League: Metro Junior Hockey League
- Operated: 1970-1972

The Scarborough Sabres are a defunct Tier II Junior "A" ice hockey team from Weston, Ontario, Canada.

== History ==
The Sabres were formed in July 1970 in Scarborough, Ontario as part of the Metro Junior Hockey League. The Sabres folded in 1972.

== Season-by-Season results ==
Season	GP	W	L	T	OTL	GF	GA	P	Results	Playoffs
1970-71	44	6	38	0	-	137	308	12	12th Metro B	
1971-72	44	19	22	3	-	165	195	41	8th Metro B	
