= Bonnetts Energy Centre =

Multi-purpose arena in Grande Prairie, Alberta

Coordinates: 55.169°N 118.796°W

Bonnetts Energy Centre, formerly known as Revolution Place, Canada Games Arena and Crystal Centre, is a 2,960-seat (plus standing) multi-purpose arena in Grande Prairie, Alberta, Canada. The arena was built in 1995, for the Canada Games.

It is home to the Grande Prairie Storm of the Alberta Junior Hockey League.

It has also hosted the 2004 Royal Bank Cup, 2006 Ford World Women's Curling Championship, and 2016 Scotties Tournament of Hearts.

The arena seats up to 4,500 for concerts. Attached to the arena is the Bowes, a convention and concert hall seating up to 1,400 with 18,000 square feet of space; both Bonnetts Energy Centre and the Bowes offer 35,000 total square feet of exhibit space.

== Concerts ==
Nickelback played at the arena during The Long Road Tour on March 20, 2004.

Nelly Furtado performed at the arena during the Get Loose Tour on March 25, 2007.

Rihanna performed at the arena during the Good Girl Gone Bad Tour on September 17, 2007, with Akon as her opening act.

The Backstreet Boys performed at the arena during their Unbreakable Tour on November 15, 2008.

Janet Jackson performed at the arena during the Unbreakable World Tour on September 5, 2015.

Shania Twain performed at the arena on October 21, 2015 during her Rock This Country Tour.

Marianas Trench performed at the arena on February 8, 2017 during their Marianas Trench and the Last Crusade tour.

Blippi performed in November 2024.
