= 1985–86 OJHL season =

- League: Ontario Junior Hockey League
- Sport: Hockey
- Duration: Regular season 1985-09 – 1986-02; Playoffs; 1986-02 – 1986-04
- Teams: 6
- Finals champions: Orillia Travelways

OJHL seasons
- 1984–85 1986–87

The 1985–86 OJHL season is the 14th season of the Ontario Junior Hockey League (OJHL). The six teams of the league played a 50-game season. The top four teams made the playoffs.

The winner of the OJHL playoffs, the Orillia Travelways, won the 1986 Buckland Cup for the OHA championship and the Dudley Hewitt Cup for the Central Canadian Championship. The Travelways failed to win the 1986 Centennial Cup.

== Changes ==
- Owen Sound Greys join OJHL from MWJHL.
- Whitby Lawmen go on hiatus then fold.
- North York Red Wings leave the OJHL.
- Aurora Tigers take one-year leave.

== Final standings ==
Note: GP = Games played; W = Wins; L = Losses; OTL = Overtime losses; SL = Shootout losses; GF = Goals for; GA = Goals against; PTS = Points; x = clinched playoff berth; y = clinched division title; z = clinched conference title

Teams
Team	GP	W	L	T	GF	GA	P
Orillia Travelways	50	35	15	0	305	205	70
Markham Waxers	50	25	16	9	244	263	59
Owen Sound Greys	50	25	20	5	254	232	55
Newmarket Flyers	50	21	19	10	237	226	52
Richmond Hill Dynes	50	17	30	3	252	292	37
Dixie Beehives	50	10	33	7	208	281	27

== 1985-86 OJHL Playoffs ==
Semi-final

Orillia Travelways defeated Newmarket Flyers 4-games-to-1
Markham Waxers defeated Owen Sound Greys 4-games-to-1

Final

Orillia Travelways defeated Markham Waxers 4-games-to-1

== OHA Buckland Cup Championship ==
The 1986 Buckland Cup was a best-of-7 series between the Onaping Falls Huskies (NOJHL) and the Orillia Travelways. The winner moved on to the 1986 Dudley Hewitt Cup Final Series.

Orillia Travelways defeated Onaping Falls Huskies (NOJHL) 4-games-to-2

Orillia 3 - Onaping Falls 2
Onaping Falls - Orillia
Onaping Falls 6 - Orillia 5
Orillia 6 - Onaping Falls 5 (OT)
Orillia 5 - Onaping Falls 4
Orillia 5 - Onaping Falls 3

== 1986 Dudley Hewitt Cup Championship ==
The 1986 Dudley Hewitt Cup was a best-of-7 series between the Brockville Braves (CJHL) and the Orillia Travelways. The winner moved on to the 1986 Centennial Cup.

Orillia Travelways defeated Brockville Braves 4-games-to-3

Brockville 8 - Orillia 1
Brockville 9 - Orillia 1
Orillia 9 - Brockville 8
Orillia 6 - Brockville 5
Orillia 6 - Brockville 3
Brockville - Orillia
Orillia 7 - Brockville 4

== 1986 Centennial Cup Championship ==
The 1986 Centennial Cup was the Canadian National Junior A championship in Cole Harbour, Nova Scotia, hosted by the Cole Harbour Colts. The Orillia Travelways lost in the semi-final.

Round Robin

Orillia Travelways defeated Moncton Hawks (MVJHL) 4-3
Cole Harbour Colts (MVJHL) defeated Orillia Travelways 9-5
Penticton Knights (BCJHL) defeated Orillia Travelways 5-2

Semi-final

Penticton Knights (BCJHL) defeated Orillia Travelways 7-3

== Leading Scorers ==
Player	Team	GP	G	A	Pts
Randy LeBrasseur	Richmond Hill Dynes	46	32	79	111
Scott Wingrove	Richmond Hill Dynes	49	47	60	107

== Players taken in the 1986 NHL entry draft ==
- Rd 6 #115 Matt O'Toole - St. Louis Blues (Markham Waxers)
- Rd 12 #236 Doug Kirkton - New Jersey Devils (Orillia Travelways)

== See also ==
- 1986 Centennial Cup
- Dudley Hewitt Cup
- List of OJHL seasons
- Northern Ontario Junior Hockey League
- Central Junior A Hockey League
- Thunder Bay Flyers
- 1985 in ice hockey
- 1986 in ice hockey

Preceded by 1984–85 OJHL season	Ontario Hockey Association; Junior A Seasons	Succeeded by 1986–87 OJHL season
