= Aurora Tigers =

Ice hockey team in Ontario, Canada

- City: Aurora, Ontario, Canada
- League: Ontario Junior Hockey League
- Founded: Circa 1953
- Home arena: Aurora Community Centre
- Colours: Black, yellow, white
- Owner: Jim Thomson
- President: Jim Thomson
- General manager: James Thomson
- Head coach: James Thomson
- Media: Fasthockey

Franchise history
- 1953-1962: Aurora Bears
- 1967-1985: Aurora Tigers
- 1986-1996: Aurora Eagles
- 1996-present: Aurora Tigers

The Aurora Tigers are a Canadian ice hockey team from Aurora, Ontario. They play in the Ontario Junior Hockey League. The team has previously played in the Metro Junior B Hockey League, Ontario Provincial Junior A Hockey League, Canadian Junior B Hockey League, Metro Junior A Hockey League and the Ontario Junior Hockey League.

== History ==
The Aurora Tigers were first formed in 1953 as a member of the Metro Junior "B" league but were known as the Aurora Bears. In 1972, the most viable teams were pulled from the Metro and put into the OHA Junior "A" league. The Tigers stayed on board until 1985, and as the financial situation of the league changed and became less viable, the Tigers folded.

In 1986, Aurora's financial interests were intrigued into coming back. With the OHA Jr. "A" now folded, the Central Junior "B" and Metro Junior "B" were consistently being judged as the heirs to the Junior "A" title. The Aurora Eagles joined the Central Junior "B" league and stayed there until 1992.

In 1991, tired of the indecisiveness of the Ontario Hockey Association in creating the next Junior "A" league, the now renegade Metro Junior "B" league declared themselves Southern Ontario's only Tier II Junior "A" league. The league even helped form the Canadian Junior A Hockey League in 1993. The forwardness of the new Junior "A" (Metro Junior A Hockey League) league drew the interest of the Aurora franchise, they joined the league in 1992. In 1996, the team reverted to the "Tigers' nickname and won the Metro league title in 1997 and then moved to the OPJHL—a year before the Metro folded.

A new era of the Tigers started in 1997. The old Central Junior "B" league was promoted to Tier II Junior "A" in 1997 and became the OPJHL. In 2002–03, the Tigers had an amazing season (only losing 3 times) but came away with no hardware in the playoffs. In 2003–04, the Tigers had an unbelievable season. With a 47–2–0–0 record, the Tigers won the Buckland Cup as OPJHL Playoff Champions, the Dudley Hewitt Cup as Central Canadian Champions, and the Royal Bank Cup as Canadian Junior "A" National Champions.

== 2003–04 season and playoffs ==
=== Dudley Hewitt Cup ===
The Tigers gained a ticket to the Dudley Hewitt Cup by winning the Buckland Cup as OPJHL champions. The Tigers started out against the Soo Thunderbirds of the Northern Ontario Junior Hockey League. Soo failed to win their league but gained a ticket to the DHC as their competitor in the final was the DHC Host. The game proved to be close, but the Tigers prevailed, 3–1. In the second game, the Tigers faced the Fort William North Stars, champions of the Superior International Junior Hockey League. The Tigers shut down their tough opponents with a 4–0 win. The North Stars, of a relatively new league, are the elite of the Thunder Bay area. Their third game saw them defeat the NOJHL Champion North Bay Skyhawks, 5–3, which earned them a bye to the DHC final.

The North Bay Skyhawks defeated the Fort William North Stars in the semi-final to meet the Aurora Tigers in the DHC final. The final, to determine a berth to the Royal Bank Cup 2004, ended up in a decisive 5–1 victory for the Tigers.

=== Royal Bank Cup 2004 ===
The Aurora Tigers started off their Royal Bank Cup 2004 tournament against a well-rested host team, the Grande Prairie Storm of the Alberta Junior Hockey League. The Storm defeated the Tigers by a score of 4–2, their last loss of the season. Game two was against the Nanaimo Clippers of the British Columbia Hockey League, the Doyle Cup Champions, defeating them 4–2. The next game pitted the Tigers against the Anavet Cup Champions Kindersley Klippers from the Saskatchewan Junior Hockey League. The Tigers won by a score of 5–0. The fourth round robin game saw the Tigers defeat the Fred Page Cup Champion Nepean Raiders of the Central Junior A Hockey League by a score of 3–1.

The Tigers finished tied for first in the round robin, but second by tie breaker. In the semi-final, they drew the Nepean Raiders again but this time beat them in convincing fashion 7–2. Kindersley upset the hosts 4–3 in the other Semi-final, drawing a lopsided 7–1 victory for the Tigers against the Klippers in the Final, earning them their first Royal Bank Cup.

== 2006–07 season and playoffs ==
Aurora @ Royal Bank Cup 2007

The Tigers finished the 2006–07 season with the top record in the OPJHL and as the top ranked team in all of the CJAHL—44 wins, 4 losses, and 1 tie.

In the playoffs, they first swept the Buffalo Jr. Sabres 4-games-to-none. They then beat the Newmarket Hurricanes 4-games-to-2. In the Division final, they defeated the Stouffville Spirit 4-games-to-1. In the Conference final, they defeated the Hamilton Red Wings 4-games-to-1 and then defeated the Wellington Dukes 4-games-to-1 to clinch the Buckland Cup as OPJHL Champions.

=== Dudley Hewitt Cup ===
In late April, the Tigers drove North to Iroquois Falls, Ontario to compete for their second Dudley Hewitt Cup. In the tourney opener, the Tigers defeated the NOJHL Champion Soo Indians 4–1. They then went the next night and beat the SIJHL Champion Schreiber Diesels 6–3. In the final game of the round robin, the Tiger beat up the host Abitibi Eskimos 7–0 to clinch first place and a bye to the tournament final. In the final game, the Tigers defeated Schreiber Diesels 10–0, having outshot them 67–23 and earning a berth to the Royal Bank Cup 2007.

=== Royal Bank Cup 2007 ===
The Tigers started off with a 4–2 win over the Selkirk Steelers (MJHL). Aurora then suffered a disappointing loss to the Pembroke Lumber Kings (CJHL), 5–3. They then took out their frustration on the host Prince George Spruce Kings (BCHL) with a 6–3 victory and then flexed some muscle with a 7–4 dismantling of their most anticipated opponent, the Camrose Kodiaks (AJHL). With a 3–1 record in the round robin, the Tiger clinched first place and the early semi-final against the 4th seed Pembroke Lumber Kings. The rematch was ugly, with the Lumber Kings leading 2–1 at one point. The Tigers tied up the game to force overtime and then tournament MVP, Top Forward, and Scoring Champion Daniel Michalsky scored the winner early in the extra frame. The Tigers went on to face Prince George in the final as they had disposed of Camrose 3–2 in fifth overtime the night before. By early in the third, the Tigers had built up a 3–0 lead and held on to win 3–1 to win their second Royal Bank Cup in four years.

=== Accolades ===
The Tigers finished the season with a combined 73 wins, 10 losses, and 1 tie. Their 2006–07 accolades include the Regular Season Crown, the #1 CJAHL National Ranking, the North Division Championship, the North/West Conference Championship, the OPJHL Buckland Cup, the Ontario Hockey Association Championship, the Ontario Hockey Federation Championship, the Dudley Hewitt Cup, and the Royal Bank Cup as the Best Junior "A" Team in Canada.

== Season-by-season results ==
Season	GP	W	L	T	OTL	GF	GA	P	Results	Playoffs
1950–51	20	6	14	0	-	74	127	12	6th Metro B	Did not qualify
1953–54	32	9	23	0	-	105	191	18	8th Metro B	Did not qualify
1954–55									Suburban C	
1955–56	16	6	10	0	-	--	--	12	5th Suburban D	DNQ
1956–57	20	16	3	1	-	--	--	33	1st Suburban C	Lost semi-final (Brooklin)
1957–58	26	13	12	1	-	--	--	27	4th Suburban C	Lost semi-final (Brooklin)
1958–59	28	18	10	0	-	152	106	36	3rd Metro B	Won League (West Toronto); Lost SC Final (Sarnia)
1959–60	28	10	11	7	-	127	132	27	5th Metro B	Lost quarter-final (Toronto)
1960–61	Did Not Participate									
1961–62	32	14	13	5	-	171	175	33	3rd Metro B	
1962–63	23	17	4	2	-	--	--	36	1st SubJCHL	Lost semi-final (Stouffville)
1963–64	28	22	5	1	-	--	--	45	1st SubJCHL	Lost final (Lindsay)
1964–65	26	8	17	1	-	--	--	17	7th SubJCHL	Lost final (Lindsay)
1965–66	32	25	4	3	-	--	--	49	1st SubJCHL	
1966–67	30	25	2	3	-	177	88	53	1st SubJCHL	Won League (Georgetown); Lost CSC Final (New Hamburg)
1967–68	36	7	26	3	-	151	243	17	10th Metro B	Did not qualify
1968–69	36	15	15	6	-	150	149	36	5th Metro B	
1969–70	36	17	14	5	-	166	145	39	6th Metro B	Lost quarter-final (Markham)
1970–71	44	17	21	6	-	218	197	40	7th Metro B	
1971–72	44	17	20	7	-	165	195	41	7th Metro B	
1972–73	44	20	20	4	-	194	190	44	5th OPJHL	Lost quarter-final (Toronto)
1973–74	44	24	12	8	-	221	180	56	5th OPJHL	Lost final (Wexford)
1974–75	44	20	16	8	-	192	178	48	7th OPJHL	Lost quarter-final (Wexford)
1975–76	44	15	21	8	-	175	203	38	11th OPJHL	Did not qualify
1976–77	44	19	17	8	-	198	188	46	5th OPJHL	Lost quarter-final (North Bay)
1977–78	50	23	22	5	-	278	278	51	5th OPJHL	Lost quarter-final (Dixie)
1978–79	50	17	29	4	-	212	267	38	8th OPJHL	Lost quarter-final (Dixie)
1979–80	44	26	14	4	-	291	224	56	3rd OPJHL	Lost semi-final (Royal York)
1980–81	44	15	29	0	-	221	280	30	11th OPJHL	Did not qualify
1981–82	50	31	15	4	-	310	252	66	3rd OJHL	Lost quarter-final (Markham)
1982–83	48	9	33	6	-	197	319	24	9th OJHL	Did not qualify
1983–84	42	4	34	4	-	168	370	12	8th OJHL	Lost quarter-final (Dixie)
1984–85	48	34	11	3	-	358	210	71	2nd OJHL	Lost final (Orillia); Lost DHC Final (Orillia); Lost MCC Semi-final (Penticton)
1985–86	Did Not Participate									
1986–87	44	25	15	4	-	270	225	54	2nd OJHL	Lost final (Owen Sound)
1987–88	44	25	13	6	-	248	194	56	4th CJBHL	Lost Division Semi-final (Barrie)
1988–89	42	17	22	3	-	207	214	37	9th CJBHL	Lost Division Quarter-final (Vaughan)
1989–90	42	11	24	7	-	160	207	29	13th CJBHL	Lost Division Quarter-final (Newmarket)
1990–91	42	22	15	5	-	205	170	49	5th CJBHL	Lost Division Final (Orillia)
1991–92	42	22	15	5	-	201	185	49	6th CJBHL	Lost final (Milton)
1992–93	48	24	22	2	-	227	221	50	6th Metro A	Lost quarter-final (Muskoka)
1993–94	50	20	26	4	-	235	268	44	10th Metro A	Did not qualify
1994–95	50	26	17	7	-	232	177	59	4th Metro A	Lost quarter-final (St. Michael's)
1995–96	52	28	18	6	-	255	206	62	6th Metro A	Lost quarter-final (Niagara)
1996–97	50	42	5	3	-	342	138	87	1st Metro A	Won League (Caledon)
1997–98	51	27	17	6	1	226	196	61	3rd OPJHL-P	Lost Division Semi-final (Newmarket)
1998–99	51	31	12	6	2	216	155	70	4th OPJHL-C	Lost Division Semi-final (Collingwood)
1999-00	47	27	15	5	0	150	130	59	4th OPJHL-N	Lost Division Quarter-final (Stouffville)
2000–01	49	18	29	0	2	189	271	38	5th OPJHL-N	Lost Division Quarter-final (Collingwood)
2001–02	49	30	15	3	1	193	150	64	3rd OPJHL-N	Lost Conference Final (Brampton)
2002–03	49	44	2	2	1	265	103	89	1st OPJHL-N	Lost final (Wellington)
2003–04	49	47	2	0	0	290	79	94	1st OPJHL-N	Won League (St. Michael's); Won DHC (North Bay); Won RBC (Kindersley)
2004–05	49	33	13	2	1	222	136	69	1st OPJHL-N	Lost Conference Final (Georgetown)
2005–06	49	35	8	4	2	210	112	76	1st OPJHL-N	Lost Division Final (Stouffville)
2006–07	49	44	4	1	0	260	99	89	1st OPJHL-N	Won League (Wellington); Won DHC (Schreiber); Won RBC (Prince George)
2007–08	49	33	12	-	4	250	138	70	3rd OPJHL-N	Lost Conference Final (Oakville
2008–09	49	37	11	-	1	228	150	75	3rd OJHL-P	Lost Division Semi-final (Huntsville)
2009–10	56	32	18	-	6	265	227	70	7th OJAHL	Lost quarter-final (Oakville)
2010–11	50	22	25	-	3	161	207	45	6th OJHL-N	Did not qualify
2011–12	49	28	13	-	8	188	163	64	3rd OJHL-N	Lost Division Semi-final (Stouffville)
2012–13	55	32	17	-	6	186	156	70	1st OJHL-N	Lost Conference Quarter-final (Lindsay)
2013–14	53	38	12	-	3	220	122	79	1st OJHL-N	Lost final (Lakeshore)
2014–15	-	-	-	-	-	-	-	-	-	-
2015–16	54	28	17	1	8	174	137	65	2nd of 6 Nor Div; 7th of 11 NE Conf; 14th of 22 OJHL	Lost Conf. Quarters 2–4 (Dukes)
2016–17	54	9	39	2	4	125	257	24	5th of 6 Nor Div; 11th of 11 NE Conf; 20th of 22 OJHL	Did not qualify
2017–18	54	36	12	1	5	224	128	78	1st of 6 Nor Div; 1st of 11 NE Conf; 5th of 22 OJHL	Won Conf. Quarters 4–2 (Golden Hawks); Won Conf. Semifinals 4–1 (Cougars); Lost NE Conf Finals 1–4 (Dukes)
2018–19	54	24	23	3	5	160	174	55	3rd of 5 Nor Div; 7th of 11 NE Conf; 15th of 22 OJHL	Lost Conf. Quarters 1-4 (Hurricanes)
2019–20	54	7	43	0	4	188	226	18	5th of 5 Nor Div; 11th of 11 NW Conf; 21st of 22 OJHL	Did Not Qualify for Post Season
2020–21	Season Lost to Covid-19 pandemic									
2021–22	54	22	23	4	4	176	166	52	3rd of 5 Nor Div; 6th of 10 NW Conf; 13th of 21 OJHL	Lost Conf. Quarters 0-2 (Blues)
2022–23	54	19	27	3	5	185	206	46	7th of 10 NW Conf; 14th of 21 OJHL	Lost Conf. Quarters 0-4 (Georgetown)
2023–24	56	13	37	2	4	137	256	32	11th of 12 East Conf; 22nd of 24 OJHL	Did Not Qualify for Post Season
2024–25	56	11	40	1	4	142	244	27	11th of 12 East Conf; 22nd of 24 OJHL	Did Not Qualify for Post Season
2025-26	56	20	34	0	2	172	239	42	10th of 12 East Conf; 19th of 24 OJHL	Did Not Qualify for Post Season

=== Playoffs ===
Original OPJHL Years

- 1973 Lost quarter-final

Toronto Nationals defeated Aurora Tigers 4-games-to-none

- 1974 Lost final

Aurora Tigers defeated Seneca Flyers 4-games-to-2
Aurora Tigers defeated North York Rangers 4-games-to-none
Wexford Raiders defeated Aurora Tigers 4-games-to-1

- 1975 Lost quarter-final

Wexford Raiders defeated Aurora Tigers 4-games-to-none

- 1976 DNQ
- 1977 Lost quarter-final

North Bay Trappers defeated Aurora Tigers 4-games-to-3

- 1978 Lost quarter-final

Dixie Beehives defeated Aurora Tigers 4-games-to-1

- 1979 Lost quarter-final

Dixie Beehives defeated Aurora Tigers 4-games-to-none

- 1980 Lost semi-final

Aurora Tigers defeated Belleville Bulls 4-games-to-3
Royal York Royals defeated Aurora Tigers 4-games-to-2

- 1981 DNQ
- 1982 Lost quarter-final

Markham Waxers defeated Aurora Tigers 4-games-to-1

- 1983 DNQ
- 1984 Lost quarter-final

Dixie Beehives defeated Aurora Tigers 4-games-to-none

- 1985 Lost final, lost Dudley Hewitt Cup final, lost 1985 Centennial Cup semi-final

Aurora Tigers defeated North York Red Wings 4-games-to-none
Aurora Tigers defeated Newmarket Flyers 4-games-to-3
Orillia Travelways defeated Aurora Tigers 4-games-to-none
Aurora Tigers defeated Sudbury Cubs (NOJHL) 4-games-to-none
Third in 1985 Centennial Cup round robin (1–2)
Penticton Knights (BCJHL) defeated Aurora Tigers 8–5 in semi-final

- 1986 Did Not Participate
- 1987 Lost final

Aurora Eagles defeated Richmond Hill Dynes 4-games-to-2
Owen Sound Greys defeated Aurora Eagles 4-games-to-none

MetJHL Years

- 1993 Lost quarter-final

Aurora Eagles defeated Bramalea Blues 3-games-to-1
Muskoka Bears defeated Aurora Eagles 4-games-to-2

- 1994 DNQ
- 1995 Lost quarter-final

St. Michael's Buzzers defeated Aurora Eagles 4-games-to-2

- 1996 Lost quarter-final

Niagara Scenic defeated Aurora Tigers 4-games-to-3

- 1997 Won League

Aurora Tigers defeated Durham Huskies 4-games-to-none
Second in round robin quarter-final (4–2)
Aurora Tigers defeated Quinte Hawks 4-games-to-2
Aurora Tigers defeated Caledon Canadians 4-games-to-none METJHL CHAMPIONS

OJHL Years

- 1998 Lost Division Semi-final

Newmarket Hurricanes defeated Aurora Tigers 4-games-to-1

- 1999 Lost Division Semi-final

Aurora Tigers defeated Markham Waxers 3-games-to-1
Collingwood Blues defeated Aurora Tigers 4-games-to-1

- 2000 Lost Division Quarter-final

Stouffville Spirit defeated Aurora Tigers 4-games-to-none

- 2001 Lost Division Quarter-final

Collingwood Blues defeated Aurora Tigers 4-games-to-1

- 2002 Lost Conference Final

Aurora Tigers defeated Parry Sound Shamrocks 4-games-to-1
Aurora Tigers defeated Couchiching Terriers 4-games-to-1
Aurora Tigers defeated Newmarket Hurricanes 4-games-to-none
Brampton Capitals defeated Aurora Tigers 4-games-to-none

- 2003 Lost final

Aurora Tigers defeated Bramalea Blues 4-games-to-none
Aurora Tigers defeated Collingwood Blues 4-games-to-1
Aurora Tigers defeated Stouffville Spirit 4-games-to-2
Aurora Tigers defeated Georgetown Raiders 4-games-to-1
Wellington Dukes defeated Aurora Tigers 4-games-to-2

- 2004 Won League, won OHF Ruddock Trophy, won Dudley Hewitt Cup, won 2004 Royal Bank Cup

Aurora Tigers defeated Lindsay Muskies 4-games-to-none
Aurora Tigers defeated Collingwood Blues 4-games-to-none
Aurora Tigers defeated Newmarket Hurricanes 4-games-to-none
Aurora Tigers defeated Oakville Blades 4-games-to-2
Aurora Tigers defeated St. Michael's Buzzers 4-games-to-2 OPJHL CHAMPIONS
First in Dudley Hewitt Cup round robin (3–0) RUDDOCK TROPHY CHAMPIONS
Aurora Tigers defeated North Bay Skyhawks (NOJHL) 5–1 in final DUDLEY HEWITT CUP CHAMPIONS
Second in 2004 Royal Bank Cup round robin (3–1)
Aurora Tigers defeated Nepean Raiders (CJHL) 7–2 in semi-final
Aurora Tigers defeated Kindersley Klippers (SJHL) 7–1 in final ROYAL BANK CUP CHAMPIONS

- 2005 Lost Conference Final

Aurora Tigers defeated Syracuse Jr. Crunch 4-games-to-1
Aurora Tigers defeated Huntsville-Muskoka Otters 4-games-to-2
Aurora Tigers defeated Newmarket Hurricanes 4-games-to-2
Georgetown Raiders defeated Aurora Tigers 4-games-to-3

- 2006 Lost Division Final

Aurora Tigers defeated Bancroft Hawks 4-games-to-none
Aurora Tigers defeated Collingwood Blues 4-games-to-1
Stouffville Spirit defeated Aurora Tigers 4-games-to-2

- 2007 Won League, won OHF Ruddock Trophy, won Dudley Hewitt Cup, won 2007 Royal Bank Cup

Aurora Tigers defeated Buffalo Jr. Sabres 4-games-to-none
Aurora Tigers defeated Newmarket Hurricanes 4-games-to-2
Aurora Tigers defeated Stouffville Spirit 4-games-to-1
Aurora Tigers defeated Hamilton Red Wings 4-games-to-1
Aurora Tigers defeated Wellington Dukes 4-games-to-1 OPJHL CHAMPIONS
First in Dudley Hewitt Cup round robin (3–0) RUDDOCK TROPHY CHAMPIONS
Aurora Tigers defeated Schreiber Diesels (SIJHL) 10–0 in final DUDLEY HEWITT CUP CHAMPIONS
First in 2007 Royal Bank Cup round robin (3–1)
Aurora Tigers defeated Pembroke Lumber Kings (CJHL) 3–2 OT in semi-final
Aurora Tigers defeated Prince George Spruce Kings (BCHL) 3–1 in final ROYAL BANK CUP CHAMPIONS

- 2008 Lost Conference Final

Aurora Tigers defeated Orangeville Crushers 3-games-to-none
Aurora Tigers defeated Newmarket Hurricanes 4-games-to-1
Aurora Tigers defeated Stouffville Spirit 4-games-to-1
Oakville Blades defeated Aurora Tigers 4-games-to-2

- 2009 Lost Division Semi-final

Aurora Tigers defeated Collingwood Blues 3-games-to-1
Huntsville Otters defeated Aurora Tigers 4-games-to-2

- 2010 Lost OJAHL Quarter-final

Oakville Blades defeated Aurora Tigers 4-games-to-1

- 2011 DNQ
- 2012 Lost Division Semi-final

Aurora Tigers defeated Orangeville Flyers 3-games-to-1
Stouffville Spirit defeated Aurora Tigers 4-games-to-1

== Sutherland Cup appearances ==
1959: Sarnia Legionnaires defeated Aurora Bruins 4-games-to-2 with 1 tie

== Notable players ==
Notable players of the Aurora Tigers:

- Jim Aldred
- David Clarkson
- Steve Downie
- Bryan Fogarty
- Evan Fong
- Anwar Hared
- Greg Hotham
- Mike Johnson
- Derek Joslin
- Chris Kelly
- Mike Kitchen
- Mike Kostka
- Jamie Macoun
- Dominic Moore
- Rick Morocco
- Alex Newhook
- Jim Rutherford

Preceded by Humboldt Broncos	Royal Bank Cup Champions; 2004	Succeeded by Weyburn Red Wings
Preceded by Burnaby Express	Royal Bank Cup Champions; 2007	Succeeded by Humboldt Broncos
