= Royal York Royals =

- City: North York, Ontario
- League: Ontario Provincial Junior A Hockey League
- Operated: 1972-1980
- Home arena: Downsview Arena
- Colours: Blue, Red, and White

The Royal York Royals are a defunct Junior "A" ice hockey team from North York, Ontario, Canada. They were a part of the Ontario Provincial Junior A Hockey League. The team was based at Downsview Arena in the Downsview neighbourhood. The team was originally named the Downsview Bees from 1971 to 1972, the Downsview Beavers from 1972 to 1974, and the Royal York Royals from 1974 to 1980.

== History ==
The Downsview Bees started operations in 1971, as part of the Metro Junior B league. In 1972, the team was one of six Metro teams to join the new OPJHL, changing its name to Beavers to reflect that they no longer were playing "Junior B" hockey. They became the Royals in 1974 and started having some success. After four consecutive years near the top of the league and little playoff success, the Royals folded in 1980.

In 1978, the Royals made it to the league finals to contend for the Buckland Trophy. Their opponent was the Guelph Platers. The Platers defeated the Royals 4-games-1. An incident in a 1975 game against the Markham Waxers where the Royals' goalkeeper, Kim Crouch, had his throat slashed open when diving into a fray lead to the development of the Kim Crouch collar, a protective neck-guard that was eventually adopted widely hockey players.

== Season-by-season results ==
Downsview Beavers 1972–1974

Season	GP	W	L	T	OTL	GF	GA	P	Results	Playoffs
Downsview Bees
1971–72	44	6	36	2	-	115	330	14	11th Metro B	
Downsview Beavers
1972–73	44	12	21	11	-	198	257	35	9th OPJHL	
1973–74	44	4	36	4	-	158	265	12	12th OPJHL	
Royal York Royals
1974–75	44	5	36	3	-	172	296	13	12th OPJHL	
1975–76	44	16	21	7	-	194	220	39	10th OPJHL	
1976–77	44	21	16	7	-	211	199	49	4th OPJHL	
1977–78	50	33	11	6	-	288	214	72	3rd OPJHL	Lost final
1978–79	50	33	13	4	-	272	190	70	2nd OPJHL	
1979–80	44	25	12	7	-	277	203	57	2nd OPJHL	

=== Playoffs ===
- 1973 DNQ
- 1974 DNQ
- 1975 DNQ
- 1976 Lost Preliminary

Toronto Nationals defeated Royal York Royals 3-games-to-2

- 1977 Lost semi-final

Royal York Royals defeated Wexford Raiders 4-games-to-2
North York Rangers defeated Royal York Royals 4-games-to-2

- 1978 Lost final

Royal York Royals defeated Newmarket Flyers 4-games-to-2
Royal York Royals defeated Dixie Beehives 4-games-to-none
Guelph Platers defeated Royal York Royals 4-games-to-1

- 1979 Lost quarter-final

North York Rangers defeated Royal York Royals 4-games-to-3

- 1980 Lost final

Royal York Royals defeated North Bay Trappers 4-games-to-3
Royal York Royals defeated Aurora Tigers 4-games-to-2
North York Rangers defeated Royal York Royals 4-games-to-1
