= North York Rangers =

Junior "A" ice hockey team from North York, Ontario, Canada

- City: Toronto, Ontario, Canada
- League: Ontario Junior Hockey League
- Founded: 1969
- Home arena: Carnegie Centennial Centre
- Colours: Blue, red, white
- Head coach: Michael Henrich

Franchise history
- 1969–1983: Richmond Hill Rams
- 1983–1989: Richmond Hill Dynes
- 1989–1992: Richmond Hill Rams
- 1992–present: North York Rangers

Current uniform

The North York Rangers are a Junior "A" ice hockey team located in the North York district of Toronto, Ontario, Canada. They are a part of the Eastern Conference of the Ontario Junior Hockey League (OJHL) and were previously a part of the Metro Junior A Hockey League.

== History ==
The Metro Junior "B" level Woodbridge Rangers moved to North York in 1967, renaming the team the North York Rangers. They advanced to the "A" league until 1972, winning several league titles before folding in 1985. When the Richmond Hill Rams Metro Junior "A" team moved to North York in 1992, they brought back the North York Rangers name. Seven seasons later, the league folded, and the North York Rangers were brought into the OJHL, where they continue to play as of 2017.

== Season-by-season results ==
1969 - 1992 History - (Richmond Hill) is hidden click to
Season	GP	W	L	T	OTL	GF	GA	P	Results	Playoffs
Richmond Hill Rams
1969–70	36	7	26	3	–	127	217	17	10th Metro B	
1970–71	44	17	24	3	–	189	197	37	9th Metro B	
1971–72	44	33	7	4	–	247	141	70	2nd Metro B	
1972–73	44	27	11	6	–	218	139	60	3rd OPJHL	
1973–74	44	19	16	9	–	176	210	47	6th OPJHL	
1974–75	44	22	17	5	–	202	196	49	5th OPJHL	
1975–76	44	27	13	4	–	218	168	58	3rd OPJHL	
1976–77	44	20	21	3	–	209	199	43	6th OPJHL	
1977–78	50	13	29	8	–	248	325	34	10th OPJHL	
1978–79	50	14	29	7	–	235	316	35	9th OPJHL	
1979–80	44	4	39	1	–	137	343	9	12th OPJHL	
1980–81	44	18	26	0	–	230	254	36	9th OPJHL	
1981–82	50	18	25	7	–	256	261	43	7th OJHL	
1982–83	48	25	19	4	–	285	259	54	4th OJHL	
Richmond Hill Dynes
1983–84	42	16	21	5	–	203	246	37	7th OJHL	
1984–85	48	18	27	3	–	230	267	39	6th OJHL	
1985–86	50	17	30	3	–	252	292	37	5th OJHL	
1986–87	43	19	17	7	–	210	200	45	3rd OJHL	
1987–88	44	18	19	7	–	251	233	43	8th CJBHL	
1988–89	42	13	23	6	–	200	237	32	11th CJBHL	
Richmond Hill Rams
1989–90	44	3	40	1	–	106	349	7	12th Metro B	
1990–91	44	13	24	7	–	179	218	33	9th Metro B	
1991–92	44	20	21	3	–	206	197	43	6th Metro A	

1992 - current History
North York Rangers
1992–93	48	23	24	1	–	197	215	47	8th Metro A	
1993–94	50	12	32	6	–	213	306	30	13th Metro A	DNQ
1994–95	50	20	27	3	–	207	219	43	10th Metro A	
1995–96	52	13	32	7	–	250	284	33	10th Metro A	DNQ
1996–97	50	12	33	5	–	248	341	29	12th Metro A	
1997–98	50	8	33	9	–	165	244	25	16th Metro A	
1998–99	51	15	30	4	2	165	225	36	9th OPJHL-C	
1999–2000	49	17	26	6	0	167	206	40	5th OPJHL-S	
2000–01	49	2	43	3	1	121	271	8	9th OPJHL-S	
2001–02	49	19	24	6	0	155	171	44	6th OPJHL-S	
2002–03	49	23	18	3	5	180	182	54	5th OPJHL-S	
2003–04	49	29	17	2	1	211	145	61	3rd OPJHL-S	
2004–05	49	30	14	5	0	223	168	65	3rd OPJHL-S	
2005–06	49	24	17	6	2	210	177	56	4th OPJHL-S	Lost Conf. QF
2006–07	49	12	30	2	5	162	148	31	8th OPJHL-S	Lost Conf. QF
2007–08	49	20	27	–	2	169	186	42	5th OPJHL-S	
2008–09	49	28	14	–	7	223	194	63	5th OJHL-P	
2009–10	50	24	21	–	5	176	196	53	8th CCHL-W	Lost Preliminary
2010–11	50	28	19	–	3	171	148	59	3rd OJHL-S	Lost Round of 16
2011–12	49	20	24	–	5	167	184	45	4th OJHL-S	Lost Division QF
2012–13	55	33	14	–	8	236	174	74	2nd OJHL-S	Lost Conf. Final
2013–14	53	29	18	–	6	200	165	64	2nd OJHL-S	Lost Conf. SF
2014–15	54	28	24	0	2	184	197	58	4th OJHL-S	Lost Conf. QF
2015–16	54	30	16	2	6	205	151	68	2nd of 6 South Div; 5th of 11 SW Conf; 8th of 22 OJHL	Won Conf. Quarters 4–1 (Jr. Sabres); Lost Conf. Semifinals 2–4 (Raiders)
2016–17	54	26	24	1	3	186	181	56	5th of 6 South Div; 7th of 11 SW Conf; 14th of 22 OJHL	Lost Conf. Quarters 1–4(Blades)
2017–18	54	37	11	1	5	180	110	80	2nd of 6 South Div; 2nd of 11 SW Conf; 2nd of 22 OJHL	Won Conf. Quarters 4–0 (Jr. Sabres); Lost Conf. Semifinals 3–4 (Raiders)
2018–19	54	40	9	1	4	214	102	85	1st of 5 South Div; 1st of 11 SE Conf; 2nd of 22 OJHL	Won Conf. Quarters 4–1 (Jr. Canadiens); Won Conf. Semifinals 4-1 (Buzzers); Lost Conf. Semifinals 3-4 (Dukes)
2019–20	54	21	25	5	3	172	203	50	4th of 6 South Div; 6th of 11 SE Conf; 15th of 22 OJHL	Won Conf. Quarters 4–1 (Jr. Canadiens) "remaining playoffs cancelled due to COVID-19"
2020–21	Season Lost to Covid-19 pandemic									
2021–22	54	38	13	2	1	199	116	79	2nd of 6 South Div; 2nd of 11 SE Conf; 4th of 21 OJHL	Won Conf. Quarters 2–1 (Buzzers); Lost Conf. Semifinals 0-2 (Jr. Canadiens)
2022–23	54	17	29	3	5	169	245	42	8th of 11 SE Conf; 16th of 21 OJHL	Lost Conf. Quarters 04 (Jr. Canadiens)
2023–24	56	8	45	1	2	123	311	19	12th of 12 East Conf; 23rd of 24 OJHL	Did Not Qualifying for Post Season
2024–25	56	5	50	1	0	108	313	11	12th of 12 East Conf; 24th of 24 OJHL	Did Not Qualifying for Post Season
2025-26	56	5	45	1	5	136	305	16	12th of 12 East Conf; 23rd of 24 OJHL	Did Not Qualifying for Post Season

=== Playoffs ===
Original OPJHL Years

- 1973 Lost semi-final

Richmond Hill Rams defeated Ajax Steelers 4-games-to-2
Toronto Nationals defeated Richmond Hill Rams 4-games-to-2

- 1974 Lost quarter-final

Wexford Raiders defeated Richmond Hill Rams 4-games-to-2

- 1975 Lost quarter-final

Toronto Nationals defeated Richmond Hill Rams 4-games-to-2

- 1976 Lost quarter-final

Markham Waxers defeated Richmond Hill Rams 3-games-to-2 with 2 ties

- 1977 Lost quarter-final

North York Rangers defeated Richmond Hill Rams 4-games-to-1

- 1978 DNQ
- 1979 DNQ
- 1980 DNQ
- 1981 DNQ
- 1982 Lost semi-final

Richmond Hill Rams defeated Newmarket Flyers 4-games-to-3
Guelph Platers defeated Richmond Hill Rams 4-games-to-none

- 1983 Lost quarter-final

Newmarket Flyers defeated Richmond Hill Rams 4-games-to-3

- 1984 Lost quarter-final

North York Rangers defeated Richmond Hill Dynes 4-games-to-2

- 1985 Lost quarter-final

Newmarket Flyers defeated Richmond Hill Dynes 4-games-to-2

- 1986 DNQ
- 1987 Lost semi-final

Aurora Eagles defeated Richmond Hill Dynes 4-games-to-2

MetJHL Years

- 1990 DNQ
- 1991 Lost quarter-final

Richmond Hill Rams defeated Mimico Monarchs 2-games-to-1
Bramalea Blues defeated Richmond Hill Rams 4-games-to-1

- 1992 Lost quarter-final

Bramalea Blues defeated Richmond Hill Rams 4-games-to-1

- 1993 Lost quarter-final

Wellington Dukes defeated North York Rangers 4-games-to-none

== NHL alumni ==
Richmond Hill Dynes to play in the National Hockey League:

- Doug Dadswell, Randy Exelby, Ron Hoover, Curtis Joseph, Darrin Madeley, Darryl Shannon

Richmond Hill Rams to play in the National Hockey League:

- Mike Donnelly, Pat Hughes, Darren Lowe, Dave Lumley, Frank Nigro, Alex Pirus

North York Rangers alumni to play in the National Hockey League:

- Jett Alexander, Scott Barney, Greg Koehler, David Nemirovsky, Theo Peckham, Peter Sarno, Stephen Weiss, Luke Gazdic
