= 2004 Royal Bank Cup =

Tournament details
- Venue(s): Crystal Centre in Grande Prairie, Alberta
- Dates: May 8, 2004 – May 16, 2004
- Teams: 5

Final positions
- Champions: Aurora Tigers (1st title)
- Runners-up: Kindersley Klippers

Tournament statistics
- Games played: 13
- Scoring leader: Josh Welter (Grande Prairie)

Awards
- MVP: Kevin Dziaduck (Kindersley)

The 2004 Royal Bank Cup was the 34th Junior "A" 2004 ice hockey National Championship for the Canadian Junior A Hockey League.

The winners of the Doyle Cup, Anavet Cup, Dudley Hewitt Cup and the Fred Page Cup along with the host city completed for the Royal Bank Cup.

The tournament was hosted by the Grande Prairie Storm in Grande Prairie, Alberta.

== The Playoffs ==
=== Round Robin ===
Pos	League (Ticket)	Team	Pld	W	L	GF	GA	GD	Qualification
1	AJHL (Host)	Grande Prairie Storm	4	3	1	18	14	+4	Semi-final
2	OPJHL (Dudley Hewitt Cup)	Aurora Tigers	4	3	1	14	7	+7	Semi-final
3	CJHL (Fred Page Cup)	Nepean Raiders	4	2	2	11	14	−3	Semi-final
4	SJHL (Anavet Cup)	Kindersley Klippers	4	1	3	8	16	−8	Semi-final
5	BCHL (Doyle Cup)	Nanaimo Clippers	4	1	3	14	14	0	

==== Results ====
Grande Prairie Storm defeated Kindersley Klippers 5-3
Nepean Raiders defeated Nanaimo Clippers 4-3 in Double Overtime
Grande Prairie Storm defeated Aurora Tigers 4-2
Nepean Raiders defeated Kindersley Klippers 2-1
Aurora Tigers defeated Nanaimo Clippers 4-2
Grande Prairie Storm defeated Nepean Raiders 7-2
Aurora Tigers defeated Kindersley Klippers 5-0
Nanaimo Clippers defeated Grande Prairie Storm 7-2
Aurora Tigers defeated Nepean Raiders 3-1
Kindersley Klippers defeated Nanaimo Clippers 4-2

=== Semi and Finals ===
Semi-finals
1	Grande Prairie Storm	3
4	Kindersley Klippers	4
2	Aurora Tigers	7
3	Nepean Raiders	2

Royal Bank Cup Finals
2	Aurora Tigers	7
4	Kindersley Klippers	1

== Award ==
Most Valuable Player: Kevin Dziaduck (Kindersley Klippers)
Top Scorer: Josh Welter (Grande Prairie Storm)
Most Sportsmanlike Player: Grant Clitsome (Nepean Raiders)
Top Goalie: Chris Whitley (Aurora Tigers)
Top Forward: Scott McCulloch (Grande Prairie Storm)
Top Defenceman: Kyle Radke (Grande Prairie Storm)

== Roll of League Champions ==
AJHL: Grande Prairie Storm
BCHL: Nanaimo Clippers
CJHL: Nepean Raiders
MJHL: Selkirk Steelers
MJAHL: Campbellton Tigers
NOJHL: North Bay Skyhawks
OPJHL: Aurora Tigers
QJAAAHL: Valleyfield Braves
SJHL: Kindersley Klippers
SIJHL: Fort William North Stars

== See also ==
- Canadian Junior A Hockey League
- Royal Bank Cup
- Anavet Cup
- Doyle Cup
- Dudley Hewitt Cup
- Fred Page Cup
