= List of OPJHL standings (1972–1981) =

The following is a listing of the Original Ontario Provincial Junior A Hockey League's Standings. The OPJHL was founded in 1972.

The OPJHL changed its name to the Ontario Hockey Association Junior A Hockey League to better show its affiliation to the Ontario Hockey Association in 1981. The OPJHL was created to compete with the Southern Ontario Junior A Hockey League.

== 1972–73 ==
The Wexford Raiders won the 1973 Buckland Trophy as OPJHL Champions.

Note: GP - Games Played, W - Wins, L - Losses, T - Ties, OTL - Overtime Losses, GF - Goals For, GA - Goals Against, P - Points.

Team	GP	W	L	T	GF	GA	P
Toronto Nationals	44	29	9	6	270	189	64
Wexford Raiders	44	26	9	9	264	185	61
Richmond Hill Rams	44	27	11	6	218	139	60
Dixie Beehives	44	23	17	4	232	197	50
Aurora Tigers	44	20	20	4	194	190	44
Weston Dodgers	44	19	19	6	233	194	44
Ajax Steelers	44	20	22	2	196	214	42
Seneca Flyers	44	16	19	9	214	241	41
Downsview Beavers	44	12	21	11	198	257	35
North York Rangers	44	11	23	10	163	185	32
North Bay Trappers	44	13	29	2	213	283	28
Kingston Frontenacs	44	13	30	1	152	273	27

=== Playoffs ===
OHA Championship

Chatham Maroons defeated Wexford Raiders 4-games-to-3

== 1973–74 ==
The Wexford Raiders won the 1974 Buckland Trophy as OPJHL Champions.

Note: GP - Games Played, W - Wins, L - Losses, T - Ties, OTL - Overtime Losses, GF - Goals For, GA - Goals Against, P - Points.

Team	GP	W	L	T	GF	GA	P
North York Rangers	44	26	11	7	231	151	59
Toronto Nationals	44	27	12	5	215	123	59
Wexford Raiders	44	26	12	6	235	172	58
Seneca Flyers	44	24	11	9	249	187	57
Aurora Tigers	44	24	12	8	221	180	56
Richmond Hill Rams	44	19	16	9	176	210	47
North Bay Trappers	44	21	19	4	264	250	46
Dixie Beehives	44	18	20	6	207	227	42
Weston Dodgers	44	13	24	7	192	225	33
Markham Waxers	44	13	25	6	168	222	32
Whitby Knob Hill Farms	44	11	28	5	167	271	27
Downsview Beavers	44	4	36	4	158	265	12

=== Playoffs ===
OHA Championship

Wexford Raiders defeated Windsor Spitfires 4-games-to-3

== 1974–75 ==
The Toronto Nationals won the 1975 Buckland Trophy as OPJHL Champions.

Note: GP - Games Played, W - Wins, L - Losses, T - Ties, OTL - Overtime Losses, GF - Goals For, GA - Goals Against, P - Points.

Team	GP	W	L	T	GF	GA	P
Seneca Flyers	44	27	12	5	251	184	59
North York Rangers	44	24	15	5	216	215	53
Toronto Nationals	44	23	15	6	235	202	52
Wexford Raiders	44	22	15	7	241	196	51
Richmond Hill Rams	44	22	17	5	202	196	49
Whitby Knob Hill Farms	44	21	17	6	205	172	48
Aurora Tigers	44	20	16	8	192	178	48
North Bay Trappers	44	22	18	4	238	208	48
Dixie Beehives	44	18	15	11	213	211	47
Markham Waxers	44	15	19	10	174	192	40
Weston Dodgers	44	8	32	4	163	252	20
Royal York Royals	44	5	36	3	172	296	13

=== Playoffs ===
OHA Championship

Guelph CMC's defeated Toronto Nationals 4-games-to-2

== 1975–76 ==
The North Bay Trappers won the 1976 Buckland Trophy as OPJHL Champions.

Note: GP - Games Played, W - Wins, L - Losses, T - Ties, OTL - Overtime Losses, GF - Goals For, GA - Goals Against, P - Points.

Team	GP	W	L	T	GF	GA	P
North York Rangers	44	31	8	5	220	142	67
North Bay Trappers	44	27	13	4	247	189	58
Richmond Hill Rams	44	27	13	4	218	168	58
Wexford Raiders	44	19	19	6	207	196	44
Ajax Knob Hill Farms	44	18	19	7	201	208	43
Markham Waxers	44	19	20	5	178	197	43
Toronto Nationals	44	16	18	10	198	180	42
Newmarket Flyers	44	18	22	4	211	211	40
Weston Dodgers	44	17	21	6	203	186	40
Royal York Royals	44	16	21	7	194	220	39
Aurora Tigers	44	15	21	8	175	203	38
Dixie Beehives	44	6	34	4	135	287	16

=== Playoffs ===
OHA Championship

Guelph Platers defeated North Bay Trappers 4-games-to-1

== 1976–77 ==
The North York Rangers won the 1977 Buckland Trophy as OPJHL Champions.

Note: GP - Games Played, W - Wins, L - Losses, T - Ties, OTL - Overtime Losses, GF - Goals For, GA - Goals Against, P - Points.

Team	GP	W	L	T	GF	GA	P
North York Rangers	44	34	6	4	281	163	72
North Bay Trappers	44	27	11	6	287	201	60
Markham Waxers	44	23	10	11	237	195	57
Royal York Royals	44	21	16	7	211	199	49
Aurora Tigers	44	19	17	8	198	188	46
Richmond Hill Rams	44	20	21	3	209	199	43
Wexford Raiders	44	20	21	3	211	219	43
Toronto Nationals	44	19	22	3	220	250	41
Weston Dodgers	44	16	23	5	186	217	37
Ajax Merchants	44	15	24	5	206	228	35
Newmarket Flyers	44	13	23	8	207	249	34
Dixie Beehives	44	3	36	5	161	306	11

=== Playoffs ===
OHA Championship

North York Rangers defeated Guelph Platers 4-games-to-3

== 1977–78 ==
The Guelph Platers won the 1978 Buckland Trophy as OPJHL Champions, the Dudley Hewitt Cup as Central Canadian Champions, and the Manitoba Centennial Cup as National Junior A Champions.

Note: GP - Games Played, W - Wins, L - Losses, T - Ties, OTL - Overtime Losses, GF - Goals For, GA - Goals Against, P - Points.

Team	GP	W	L	T	GF	GA	P
Guelph Platers	50	38	8	4	360	197	80
Dixie Beehives	50	33	10	7	326	245	73
Royal York Royals	50	33	11	6	288	214	72
North Bay Trappers	50	27	16	7	285	245	61
Aurora Tigers	50	23	22	5	278	278	51
Wexford Raiders	50	18	25	7	268	308	43
North York Rangers	50	17	26	7	232	257	41
Markham Waxers	50	17	27	6	229	284	40
Newmarket Flyers	50	16	26	8	239	252	40
Richmond Hill Rams	50	13	29	8	248	325	34
Hamilton Mountain A's	50	7	42	1	163	311	15

=== Playoffs ===
Final

Guelph Platers defeated Royal York Royals 4-games-to-1

== 1978–79 ==
The Guelph Platers won the 1979 Buckland Trophy as OPJHL Champions and the Dudley Hewitt Cup as Central Canadian Champions.

Note: GP - Games Played, W - Wins, L - Losses, T - Ties, OTL - Overtime Losses, GF - Goals For, GA - Goals Against, P - Points.

Team	GP	W	L	T	GF	GA	P
Guelph Platers	50	33	12	5	294	186	71
Royal York Royals	50	33	13	4	272	190	70
North Bay Trappers	50	33	14	3	313	224	69
Dixie Beehives	50	29	18	3	240	219	61
North York Rangers	50	27	17	6	288	237	60
Newmarket Flyers	50	19	25	6	223	249	44
Markham Waxers	50	17	27	6	220	242	40
Aurora Tigers	50	17	29	4	212	267	38
Richmond Hill Rams	50	14	29	7	235	316	35
Wexford Raiders	50	14	31	5	208	280	33
Hamilton Mountain A's	50	13	34	3	219	314	29

=== Playoffs ===
OHA Championship

Guelph Platers defeated Dixie Beehives 4-games-to-1

== 1979–80 ==
The North York Rangers won the 1980 Buckland Trophy as OPJHL Champions and the Dudley Hewitt Cup as Central Canadian Champions.

Note: GP - Games Played, W - Wins, L - Losses, T - Ties, OTL - Overtime Losses, GF - Goals For, GA - Goals Against, P - Points.

Team	GP	W	L	T	GF	GA	P
Dixie Beehives	44	33	5	6	286	173	72
Royal York Royals	44	25	12	7	277	203	57
Aurora Tigers	44	26	14	4	291	224	56
North York Rangers	44	26	14	4	239	183	56
Belleville Bulls	44	24	18	2	235	191	50
North Bay Trappers	44	22	17	5	228	181	49
Guelph Platers	44	21	17	6	215	175	48
Wexford Raiders	44	17	20	7	238	241	41
Hamilton Mountain A's	44	14	21	9	218	262	37
Markham Waxers	44	14	23	7	233	253	35
Newmarket Flyers	44	7	33	4	156	324	18
Richmond Hill Rams	44	4	39	1	137	343	9

=== Playoffs ===
OHA Championship

North York Rangers defeated Onaping Falls Huskies 3-games-to-none

== 1980–81 ==
The Belleville Bulls won the 1981 Buckland Trophy as OPJHL Champions and the Dudley Hewitt Cup as Central Canadian Champions.

Note: GP - Games Played, W - Wins, L - Losses, T - Ties, OTL - Overtime Losses, GF - Goals For, GA - Goals Against, P - Points.

Team	GP	W	L	T	GF	GA	P
Belleville Bulls	44	35	7	2	273	138	72
Guelph Platers	44	32	10	2	269	187	66
North York Rangers	44	24	17	3	259	218	51
Dixie Beehives	44	23	19	2	210	208	48
Hamilton Mountain A's	44	23	19	2	228	204	48
North Bay Trappers	44	22	22	0	240	253	44
Brampton Warriors	44	20	23	1	268	273	41
Markham Waxers	44	18	25	1	247	251	37
Richmond Hill Rams	44	18	26	0	230	254	36
Newmarket Flyers	44	16	28	0	210	290	32
Aurora Tigers	44	15	29	0	221	280	30
Wexford Raiders	44	11	32	1	234	334	23

=== Playoffs ===
OHA Championship

Belleville Bulls defeated Onaping Falls Huskies 3-games-to-none

== See also ==
- List of OJHL Standings (1981-1987)
- List of OPJHL Standings (1993-Present)
