= 1987 in ice hockey =

The following is a chronicle of events during the year 1987 in ice hockey.

== National Hockey League ==
- Art Ross Trophy as the NHL's leading scorer during the regular season: Wayne Gretzky
- Hart Memorial Trophy: for the NHL's Most Valuable Player: Wayne Gretzky
- Stanley Cup - the Edmonton Oilers defeat the Philadelphia Flyers 1987 Stanley Cup Finals
- With the first overall pick in the 1987 NHL Amateur Draft, the Buffalo Sabres selected Pierre Turgeon

== Canadian Hockey League ==
- Ontario Hockey League: J. Ross Robertson Cup.
- Quebec Major Junior Hockey League: won President's Cup (QMJHL) for the first time in team history
- Western Hockey League: President's Cup (WHL) for the first time in team history
- Memorial Cup:

== Minor League hockey ==
- AHL: Calder Cup
- IHL: Turner Cup.
- Allan Cup: the Brantford Mott's Clamatos

== University hockey ==
NCAA Division I Men's Ice Hockey Tournament

*the Plattsburgh State Cardinals won the NCAA Division III men's ice hockey tournament

*Tony Hrkac won the Hobey Baker Award

*

== Season articles ==
1986–87 NHL season	1987–88 NHL season
1986–87 AHL season	1987–88 AHL season

== See also ==
- 1987 in sports
