= Toronto Nationals (ice hockey) =

- City: Vaughan, Ontario
- League: Ontario Provincial Junior A Hockey League
- Operated: 1972-1977
- Home arena: Vaughan Arena
- Colours: Red, Black, and White

Franchise history
- 1972-1974: Vaughan Nationals
- 1974-1977: Toronto Nationals

Previous franchise history
- 1970-1976: Toronto Nationals Jr. B
- 1976-1980: Seneca Nationals

The Toronto Nationals are a pair of defunct Tier II Junior "A" & Junior "B" ice hockey teams from Vaughan, Ontario, Canada. They were a part of the Ontario Provincial Junior A Hockey League and the Metro Junior B Hockey League.

== Jr. A Nationals ==
In 1975, the Nationals won their one and only Junior "A" league title. They went on to the Ontario Hockey Association Championship and met the Southern Ontario Junior A Hockey League Champion Guelph CMC's. Guelph came out on top 4-games-to-2. The Nationals folded in 1977.

=== Season-by-season results ===
Season	GP	W	L	T	GF	GA	P	Results	Playoffs
Vaughan Nationals
1972-73	44	29	9	6	270	189	64	1st OPJHL	
1973-74	44	27	12	5	215	123	59	2nd OPJHL	
Toronto Nationals
1974-75	44	23	15	6	235	202	52	3rd OPJHL	Won League
1975-76	44	16	18	10	198	180	42	7th OPJHL	
1976-77	44	19	22	3	220	250	41	8th OPJHL	

=== Playoffs ===
- 1973 Lost final

Toronto Nationals defeated Aurora Tigers 4-games-to-none
Toronto Nationals defeated Richmond Hill Rams 4-games-to-2
Wexford Raiders defeated Toronto Nationals 4-games-to-1

- 1974 Lost quarter-final

North Bay Trappers defeated Toronto Nationals 4-games-to-3

- 1975 Won League, lost OHA Buckland Cup

Toronto Nationals defeated Richmond Hill Rams 4-games-to-2
Toronto Nationals defeated Seneca Flyers 4-games-to-none
Toronto Nationals defeated Wexford Raiders 4-games-to-1 OPJHL CHAMPIONS
Guelph CMC's (SOJHL) defeated Toronto Nationals 4-games-to-2

- 1976 Lost semi-final

Toronto Nationals defeated Royal York Royals 3-games-to-2
Toronto Nationals defeated Weston Dodgers 2-games-to-none
North York Rangers defeated Toronto Nationals 4-games-to-1

- 1977 Lost quarter-final

Markham Waxers defeated Toronto Nationals 4-games-to-none

== Jr. B Nationals ==
In the early 1970s, the Toronto Nationals also had an entry in the Metro Junior B Hockey League who were 1973 Metro Champions and runners up for the Sutherland Cup All-Ontario title. The 1975-76 season saw a 14-year-old Wayne Gretzky challenge the wishes of the Canadian Amateur Hockey Association and sign with the Toronto Nationals. Barely 16 years old, Gretzky had played two seasons with the Nationals and scored 63 goals for 132 points in just 60 games. The Nationals won the 1977 Metro championship, led by the young Gretzky with 75 points in just 23 playoff games. The next season, he signed with the Sault Ste. Marie Greyhounds, a quick stop before going professional and starting what is considered by many hockey enthusiasts as the greatest career in hockey history.

=== Season-by-season results ===
Season	GP	W	L	T	GF	GA	P	Results	Playoffs
Toronto Nationals
1970-71	43	25	14	4	201	174	54	4th Metro B	
1971-72	44	21	17	6	205	172	48	2nd Metro B	
1972-73	34	21	9	4	151	197	46	2nd Metro B	Won League
1973-74	44	9	30	5	154	256	23	10th Metro B	
1974-75	38	4	33	1	119	258	9	14th Metro B	
1975-76	36	13	15	8	180	190	34	8th Metro B	
Seneca Nationals
1976-77	36	17	14	5	183	181	39	3rd Metro B	Won League
1977-78	36	17	13	6	175	179	40	5th Metro B	
1978-79	44	24	14	6	273	262	54	6th Metro B	
1979-80	41	18	19	4	261	294	40	8th Metro B	

=== Sutherland Cup appearances ===
1973: Sarnia Bees defeated Toronto Nationals 4-games-to-2

=== Notable Jr. B alumni ===
- Bill Gardner
- Wayne Gretzky
- Basil McRae
- Rick Middleton

Dave Shand

- Daryl Evans

Dwight Foster Rob Palmer Warren Holmes
