= Weston Dodgers =

- City: Weston, Ontario
- League: Ontario Provincial Junior A Hockey League
- Operated: 1962-1977
- Home arena: Weston Arena
- Colours: Burgundy, Black, and White

The Weston Dodgers are a defunct Tier II Junior "A" ice hockey team from Weston, Ontario, Canada. They were a part of the Ontario Provincial Junior A Hockey League. The franchise was previously known as the Woodbridge Dodgers from 1953 to 1962, and became the Weston Dodgers after that.

== History ==
The Dodgers started out in Woodbridge, Ontario as part of the Toronto Metro Junior B Hockey League. In 1962, the Dodgers were moved to Weston. They played reached the finals of the 1964 Sutherland Cup but lost to the Waterloo Siskins 4-1. With the formation of the Junior A Ontario Hockey Association, the Dodgers moved up in the OPJHL in 1972.

Moved in 1972, the Dodgers played five seasons of OPJHL Hockey. Their best season was their first season where they finished in 6th place overall, but it is doubtful they ever made the playoffs after that year. After four straight losing seasons, the Dodgers folded in 1977.

== Season-by-season results ==
Season	GP	W	L	T	OTL	GF	GA	P	Results	Playoffs
1970-71	44	29	10	5	-	258	160	63	2nd Metro B	
1971-72	44	26	14	4	-	239	172	56	3rd Metro B	
1972-73	44	19	19	6	-	233	194	44	6th OPJHL	
1973-74	44	13	24	7	-	192	225	33	9th OPJHL	
1974-75	44	8	32	4	-	163	252	20	11th OPJHL	
1975-76	44	17	21	6	-	203	186	40	9th OPJHL	
1976-77	44	16	23	5	-	186	217	37	9th OPJHL	

=== Playoffs ===
- 1973 Lost quarter-final

Wexford Raiders defeated Weston Dodgers 4-games-to-1

- 1974 DNQ
- 1975 DNQ
- 1976 Lost quarter-final

Weston Dodgers defeated Newmarket Flyers 3-games-to-2
Toronto Nationals defeated Weston Dodgers 2-games-to-none

- 1977 DNQ

== Sutherland Cup appearances ==
- 1955: Woodstock Warriors defeated Woodbridge Dodgers 4-2
- 1964: Waterloo Siskins defeated Weston Dodgers 4-games-to-1
