= Hamilton Mountain A's =

- City: Hamilton, Ontario
- League: Ontario Provincial Junior A Hockey League
- Operated: 1960-1984
- Home arena: Mountain Arena
- Colours: Green, Yellow, and White

Franchise history
- 1960-1962: Hamilton Red Wing B's
- 1962-1975: Hamilton Mountain Bees
- 1975-1984: Hamilton Mountain A's

The Hamilton Mountain A's are a defunct Junior "A" ice hockey team from Hamilton, Ontario, Canada. They were a part of the Ontario Provincial Junior A Hockey League.

== History ==
Originating as the Hamilton Red Wing B's, the team became the Hamilton Mountain Bees in 1967 as a member of the Niagara & District Junior B Hockey League. In 1974, the team switched over to the new Golden Horseshoe Junior B Hockey League.

The team joined the Southern Ontario Junior A Hockey League in 1975, and later joined the OPJHL in 1977. They folded in 1984 to make way for the Ontario Hockey League's Hamilton Steelhawks.

== Season-by-season results ==
Season	GP	W	L	T	OTL	GF	GA	P	Results	Playoffs
1960-61	30	11	16	3	-	147	163	25	4th CJBHL	
1961-62	30	11	17	2	-	140	171	24	4th CJBHL	
1962-63	30	18	9	3	-	-	-	39	2nd NDJBHL	
1963-64	30	18	8	4	-	164	121	40	1st NDJBHL	
1964-65	30	20	8	2	-	200	113	42	2nd NDJBHL	Won League
1965-66	30	23	7	0	-	195	115	46	1st NDJBHL	Won League
1966-67	Did Not Play									
1967-68	30	15	11	4	-	137	120	34	3rd NDJBHL	
1968-69	36	21	8	7	-	149	114	49	1st NDJBHL	Won League
1969-70	36	26	7	3	-	207	132	55	1st NDJBHL	Won League
1970-71	36	23	10	2	-	207	119	48	2nd NDJBHL	Won League
1971-72	35	20	10	5	-	198	131	43	2nd NDJBHL	
1972-73	35	25	5	5	-	231	112	55	1st NDJBHL	Won League
1973-74	35	28	6	1	-	249	143	57	1st NDJBHL	Won League
1974-75	40	20	12	8	-	186	137	48	3rd GHJHL	
1975-76	60	24	30	6	-	253	287	54	4th SOJAHL	
1976-77	38	19	12	7	-	173	169	45	2nd SOJAHL	Lost semi-final
1977-78	50	7	42	1	-	163	311	15	11th OPJHL	
1978-79	50	13	34	3	-	219	314	29	11th OPJHL	
1979-80	44	14	21	9	-	218	262	37	9th OPJHL	
1980-81	44	23	19	2	-	228	204	48	5th OPJHL	
1981-82	50	18	29	3	-	229	292	39	9th OJHL	
1982-83	48	21	21	6	-	226	224	48	6th OJHL	
1983-84	42	16	18	8	-	187	191	40	6th OJHL	

=== Playoffs ===
SOJHL Years

- 1976 Lost semi-final

Chatham Maroons defeated Hamilton Mountain A's 4-games-to-3

- 1977 Lost semi-final

Collingwood Blues defeated Hamilton Mountain A's 4-games-to-2

OPJHL Years

- 1978 DNQ
- 1979 DNQ
- 1980 DNQ
- 1981 Lost quarter-final

North Bay Trappers defeated Hamilton Mountain A's 4-games-to-3

- 1982 DNQ
- 1983 Lost semi-final

Hamilton Mountain A's defeated Dixie Beehives 4-games-to-1
North York Rangers defeated Hamilton Mountain A's 4-games-to-3

- 1984 Lost quarter-final

Newmarket Flyers defeated Hamilton Mountain A's 4-games-to-none

== Sutherland Cup appearances ==
1970: Dixie Beehives defeated Hamilton Mountain A's 4-games-to-1 with 1 tie
1971: Dixie Beehives defeated Hamilton Mountain A's 4-games-to-1
