= Twinney =

Twinney may refer to:

== People ==
- Dick Twinney, English illustrator
- Ray Twinney (1935–1994), Canadian politician

== Other uses ==
- Ray Twinney Complex, building in Canada
