= Derek Wilkinson (ice hockey) =

Canadian ice hockey player and coach

- Born: July 29, 1974 (age 51) LaSalle, Ontario, Canada
- Height: 6 ft 0 in (183 cm)
- Weight: 160 lb (73 kg; 11 st 6 lb)
- Position: Goaltender
- Caught: Left
- Played for: Tampa Bay Lightning
- NHL draft: 145th overall, 1992; Tampa Bay Lightning
- Playing career: 1994–2003

Derek Wilkinson (born July 29, 1974) is a Canadian former professional ice hockey goaltender.

== Career ==
Wilkinson played his entire National Hockey League career with the Tampa Bay Lightning. His NHL career started in 1995 and he lasted until the 1999 season. He appeared in 22 games in his NHL career.

He was the final head coach of the Charlotte Checkers of the ECHL, from 2004 until the team moved up to the American Hockey League in 2010.

== Career statistics ==
=== Regular season and playoffs ===
			Regular season									Playoffs
Season	Team	League	GP	W	L	T	MIN	GA	SO	GAA	SV%	GP	W	L	MIN	GA	SO	GAA	SV%
1991–92	Detroit Compuware Ambassadors	OHL	38	16	17	1	1943	138	1	4.26	.884	7	3	2	313	28	0	5.37	—
1992–93	Detroit Junior Red Wings	OHL	4	1	2	1	245	18	0	4.41	—	—	—	—	—	—	—	—	—
1992–93	Belleville Bulls	OHL	59	21	24	11	3370	237	0	4.22	—	7	3	4	434	29	0	4.01	—
1993–94	Belleville Bulls	OHL	56	24	16	4	2860	179	2	3.76	.880	12	6	6	700	39	1	3.34	—
1994–95	Atlanta Knights	IHL	46	22	17	2	2414	121	1	3.01	.891	4	2	1	197	8	0	2.43	.891
1995–96	Atlanta Knights	IHL	28	11	11	2	1433	98	1	4.10	.881	—	—	—	—	—	—	—	—
1995–96	Tampa Bay Lightning	NHL	3	0	3	0	200	15	0	4.50	.857	—	—	—	—	—	—	—	—
1996–97	Cleveland Lumberjacks	IHL	46	20	17	6	2595	138	1	3.19	.907	14	8	6	893	44	0	2.95	.904
1996–97	Tampa Bay Lightning	NHL	5	0	2	1	170	12	0	4.26	.833	—	—	—	—	—	—	—	—
1997–98	Cleveland Lumberjacks	IHL	46	20	17	6	2595	138	1	3.19	.907	1	0	0	27	1	0	2.19	.917
1997–98	Tampa Bay Lightning	NHL	8	2	4	1	311	17	0	3.28	.885	—	—	—	—	—	—	—	—
1998–99	Cleveland Lumberjacks	IHL	34	10	15	2	1760	108	1	3.68	.895	—	—	—	—	—	—	—	—
1998–99	Tampa Bay Lightning	NHL	5	1	3	1	253	13	0	3.08	.898	—	—	—	—	—	—	—	—
1999–00	Chicago Wolves	IHL	1	0	0	1	60	5	0	5.00	.884	—	—	—	—	—	—	—	—
1999–00	Charlotte Checkers	ECHL	31	11	13	2	1435	83	0	3.47	.903	—	—	—	—	—	—	—	—
2000–01	Belfast Giants	BISL	23	—	—	—	—	—	—	3.11	.895	—	—	—	—	—	—	—	—
NHL totals			22	3	12	3	933	215	0	3.67	.874	—	—	—	—	—	—	—	—
