= Colin Baustad =

Canadian ice hockey player

- Born: August 31, 1969 (age 57) Calgary, Alberta, Canada
- Height: 5 ft 10 in (178 cm)
- Weight: 178 lb (81 kg; 12 st 10 lb)
- Position: Defence
- Shot: Left
- Played for: Tulsa Oilers (CHL); Shreveport Mudbugs (WPHL)
- National team: Canada
- NHL draft: Undrafted
- Playing career: 1994–1998

Colin Baustad (born August 31, 1969) is a Canadian former professional ice hockey defenceman and inline hockey player. He played with the Canada men's national ice hockey team during the 1992–93 season.

Baustad is currently a coach in Calgary, Alberta.

== Career statistics ==
			Regular season					Playoffs
Season	Team	League	GP	G	A	Pts	PIM	GP	G	A	Pts	PIM
1987–88	Calgary Canucks	AJHL	51	2	30	32	40	—	—	—	—	—
1988–89	Calgary Canucks	AJHL	58	4	24	28	58	—	—	—	—	—
1989–90	University of Lethbridge	CIAU	18	1	0	1	8	—	—	—	—	—
1990–91	University of Lethbridge	CIAU	28	7	20	27	18	—	—	—	—	—
1991–92	University of Lethbridge	CIAU	28	7	17	24	6	—	—	—	—	—
1992–93	University of Lethbridge	CIAU	28	2	20	22	33	—	—	—	—	—
1993–94	University of Lethbridge	CIAU	27	4	22	26	18	—	—	—	—	—
1994–95	Tulsa Oilers	CHL	66	12	26	38	27	7	1	2	3	2
1995–96	Tulsa Oilers	CHL	64	17	49	66	18	6	3	4	7	2
1996–97	Tulsa Oilers	CHL	66	20	47	67	18	5	2	5	7	0
1997–98	Shreveport Mudbugs	WPHL	69	14	22	36	18	8	1	1	2	0
CHL totals			196	49	122	171	63	18	6	11	17	4
