= Jamie Allison =

Canadian ice hockey defenceman (born 1975)

- Born: May 13, 1975 (age 50) Lindsay, Ontario, Canada
- Height: 6 ft 1 in (185 cm)
- Weight: 220 lb (100 kg; 15 st 10 lb)
- Position: Defence
- Shot: Left
- Played for: Calgary Flames; Chicago Blackhawks; Columbus Blue Jackets; Nashville Predators; Florida Panthers
- NHL draft: 44th overall, 1993; Calgary Flames
- Playing career: 1995–2007
- Website: JamieAllison.ca

James E. Allison (born May 13, 1975) is a Canadian former professional ice hockey defenceman. He played for the Calgary Flames. Chicago Blackhawks, Ottawa Senators, Columbus Blue Jackets, Nashville Predators and Florida Panthers of the National Hockey League.

== Playing career ==
=== Junior ===
Allison was drafted 7th overall in the 1991 OHL Priority Draft by the Windsor Spitfires of the Ontario Hockey League. After his rookie season, he was traded to the Detroit Junior Red Wings. He was named team captain for the 1994-95 OHL season and helped lead the team to the win the J. Ross Robertson Cup as OHL Champions. They advanced to the 1995 Memorial Cup final, where they lost to the Kamloops Blazers.

=== Professional ===
He was drafted by the Calgary Flames 44th overall in the 1993 NHL entry draft. He made his NHL debut with the Calgary Flames in the 1994–95 season. He has since played for Chicago, Columbus, Nashville, and Florida in the NHL.

On December 13, 2005, goaltender Chris Mason was injured during the pre-game warmups, resulting in the Predators having no backup goaltender. As he was scheduled to be a healthy scratch that game, Allison was dressed the backup goaltender, instead.

In 2006, he was signed by the Ottawa Senators as a free agent and played his final season with the Senators' American Hockey League (AHL) affiliate Binghamton Senators. He played in 11 seasons in the NHL, appearing in 372 games, with 7 goals and 23 assists, as well as 639 penalty minutes.

== Post-Retirement ==
In 2007, he was named an assistant coach for the Brampton Battalion of the OHL.

As of 2024, he is the Youth Hockey Operations Manager at Baptist Health IcePlex, which is the Florida Panthers Training Facility at the FTL War Memorial.

=== Regular season and playoffs ===
			Regular season					Playoffs
Season	Team	League	GP	G	A	Pts	PIM	GP	G	A	Pts	PIM
1991–92	Windsor Spitfires	OHL	59	4	8	12	70	4	1	1	2	2
1992–93	Detroit Jr. Red Wings	OHL	61	0	13	13	64	15	2	5	7	23
1993–94	Detroit Jr. Red Wings	OHL	40	2	22	24	69	17	2	9	11	35
1994–95	Detroit Jr. Red Wings	OHL	50	1	14	15	119	18	2	7	9	35
1994–95	Calgary Flames	NHL	1	0	0	0	0	—	—	—	—	—
1995–96	Saint John Flames	AHL	71	3	16	19	223	14	0	1	1	4
1996–97	Saint John Flames	AHL	46	3	6	9	139	—	—	—	—	—
1996–97	Calgary Flames	NHL	20	0	0	0	35	—	—	—	—	—
1997–98	Saint John Flames	AHL	16	0	5	5	49	—	—	—	—	—
1997–98	Calgary Flames	NHL	43	3	8	11	104	—	—	—	—	—
1998–99	Chicago Blackhawks	NHL	39	2	2	4	62	—	—	—	—	—
1998–99	Saint John Flames	AHL	5	0	0	0	23	—	—	—	—	—
1998–99	Indianapolis Ice	IHL	3	1	0	1	10	—	—	—	—	—
1999–00	Chicago Blackhawks	NHL	59	1	3	4	102	—	—	—	—	—
2000–01	Chicago Blackhawks	NHL	44	1	3	4	53	—	—	—	—	—
2001–02	Calgary Flames	NHL	37	0	2	2	24	—	—	—	—	—
2001–02	Columbus Blue Jackets	NHL	7	0	0	0	28	—	—	—	—	—
2002–03	Columbus Blue Jackets	NHL	48	0	1	1	99	—	—	—	—	—
2003–04	Nashville Predators	NHL	47	0	3	3	76	—	—	—	—	—
2004–05	Cambridge Hornets	OHA Sr.	5	0	3	3	4	—	—	—	—	—
2005–06	Nashville Predators	NHL	20	0	1	1	45	—	—	—	—	—
2005–06	Florida Panthers	NHL	7	0	0	0	11	—	—	—	—	—
2006–07	Binghamton Senators	AHL	47	2	5	7	97	—	—	—	—	—
NHL totals			372	7	23	30	639	—	—	—	—	—
AHL totals			185	8	32	40	531	19	0	3	3	20
