= Todd Harvey =

Canadian ice hockey player (born 1975)

- Born: February 17, 1975 (age 51) Hamilton, Ontario, Canada
- Height: 6 ft 0 in (183 cm)
- Weight: 195 lb (88 kg; 13 st 13 lb)
- Position: Right wing
- Shot: Right
- Played for: Dallas Stars; New York Rangers; San Jose Sharks; Edmonton Oilers
- NHL draft: 9th overall, 1993; Dallas Stars
- Playing career: 1994–2006

Todd Douglas Ross Harvey (born February 17, 1975) is a Canadian former professional ice hockey forward and current director of amateur scouting for the Vancouver Canucks of the National Hockey League (NHL). During his playing career, he played for the Dallas Stars, New York Rangers, San Jose Sharks, and Edmonton Oilers. He was selected in the first round (9th overall) of the 1993 NHL entry draft by the Stars, following a successful junior career in which he represented Canada at the World Junior Hockey Championships.

== Career ==
Harvey was born in Hamilton, Ontario and grew up in the small town of Sheffield. He played minor hockey for the Beverly Merchants of the OMHA before playing Jr.B. hockey at age 14 for the Cambridge Winterhawks. He spent two seasons playing Jr.B. in the OHA before being selected 1st overall in the 1991 OHL Priority Selection by the Detroit Jr. Red Wings of the OHL.

Although a first-round NHL selection, Harvey was never able to live up to the offensive expectations that accompanied his high draft position. His intense playing style, combined with a smallish frame, led to numerous injuries over a ten-year NHL career, and after three seasons in Dallas and a brief stint with the New York Rangers, Harvey was dealt to the San Jose Sharks. In his fifth season with the Sharks, Harvey saw his stock fall and he was ultimately demoted to the AHL's Cleveland Barons. Following the 2003-04 season, the Sharks elected not to resign Harvey and he was allowed to leave as a free agent.

Harvey signed as a free agent with the Edmonton Oilers just prior to the 2004–05 NHL lockout. He was part of Edmonton's cinderella run to the 2006 Stanley Cup Finals, where the Oilers lost in game 7 to the Carolina Hurricanes. Harvey contributed 1 goal and 1 assist during the Oilers improbable playoff run. At season's end, Harvey's contract was bought out by the Oilers and his NHL career came to an end.

After his NHL career had ended, Harvey joined the Dundas Real McCoys of the Ontario Hockey Association.

== Coaching & scouting ==
After retiring as a player, Harvey served as an assistant coach for the OHL's Guelph Storm from 2012 to 2017, and was part of the team's 2013-14 OHL Championship. On July 24, 2017, the Storm announced that Harvey was leaving the OHL team to accept a position as an amateur scout with an unnamed NHL organization. It was later confirmed that he became a scout for the Vancouver Canucks. During the 2020 NHL off-season, Harvey was promoted to serve as the Canucks' director of amateur scouting, beginning with the 2020 NHL entry draft.

== Personal life ==
On August 12, 1996, Harvey was arrested alongside then-teammate Grant Marshall and two other men who were not NHL players for sexually assaulting a 20-year-old woman at a house party in Winnipeg. All four men were charged with the case being dropped soon afterwards.

== Transactions ==
- June 26, 1993 - Harvey drafted by Dallas
- March 24, 1998 Harvey traded by Dallas to New York, along with Bob Errey and a 4th round draft pick (Boyd Kane) in exchange for Brian Skrudland, Mike Keane, and a 6th round draft pick (Pavel Patera)
- December 30, 1999 - Harvey traded by New York to San Jose, along with a 4th round draft pick (Dimitri Patzold) in exchange for Radek Dvořák
- September 16, 2004 - Harvey signs with Edmonton

== Career statistics ==
=== Regular season and playoffs ===
			Regular season					Playoffs
Season	Team	League	GP	G	A	Pts	PIM	GP	G	A	Pts	PIM
1989–90	Cambridge Winter Hawks	MWJHL	41	35	27	62	213	—	—	—	—	—
1990–91	Cambridge Winter Hawks	MWJHL	35	32	39	71	174	—	—	—	—	—
1991–92	Detroit Compuware Ambassadors	OHL	58	21	43	64	141	7	3	5	8	30
1992–93	Detroit Jr. Red Wings	OHL	55	50	50	100	83	15	9	12	21	39
1993–94	Detroit Jr. Red Wings	OHL	49	34	51	85	75	17	10	12	22	26
1994–95	Detroit Jr. Red Wings	OHL	11	8	14	22	12	—	—	—	—	—
1994–95	Dallas Stars	NHL	40	11	9	20	67	5	0	0	0	8
1995–96	Dallas Stars	NHL	69	9	20	29	136	—	—	—	—	—
1995–96	Michigan K-Wings	IHL	5	1	3	4	8	—	—	—	—	—
1996–97	Dallas Stars	NHL	71	9	22	31	142	7	0	1	1	10
1997–98	Dallas Stars	NHL	59	9	10	19	104	—	—	—	—	—
1998–99	New York Rangers	NHL	37	11	17	28	72	—	—	—	—	—
1999–2000	New York Rangers	NHL	31	3	3	6	62	—	—	—	—	—
1999–2000	San Jose Sharks	NHL	40	8	4	12	78	12	1	0	1	8
2000–01	San Jose Sharks	NHL	69	10	11	21	72	6	0	0	0	8
2001–02	San Jose Sharks	NHL	69	9	13	22	73	12	0	2	2	12
2002–03	San Jose Sharks	NHL	76	3	16	19	74	—	—	—	—	—
2003–04	San Jose Sharks	NHL	47	4	5	9	38	16	1	2	3	2
2003–04	Cleveland Barons	AHL	13	6	1	7	29	—	—	—	—	—
2004–05	Cambridge Hornets	MLH	16	9	15	24	31	—	—	—	—	—
2005–06	Edmonton Oilers	NHL	63	5	2	7	32	10	1	1	2	4
2006–07	Dundas Real McCoys	MLH	1	1	0	1	0	—	—	—	—	—
2007–08	Dundas Real McCoys	MLH	23	12	14	26	66	9	3	8	11	10
NHL totals			671	91	132	223	950	68	3	6	9	52

=== International ===
Year	Team	Event	GP	G	A	Pts	PIM
1994	Canada	WJC	7	4	3	7	6
1995	Canada	WJC	7	6	0	6	4
Junior totals			14	10	3	13	10

Preceded by Richard Matvichuk	Dallas Stars first-round draft pick 1993	Succeeded by Jason Botterill
