= Mike Prokopec =

Canadian ice hockey player

- Born: May 17, 1974 (age 51) Toronto, Ontario, Canada
- Height: 6 ft 2 in (188 cm)
- Weight: 190 lb (86 kg; 13 st 8 lb)
- Position: Right wing
- Shot: Right
- Played for: Indianapolis Ice; Chicago Blackhawks; Detroit Vipers; Worcester IceCats; Manitoba Moose
- NHL draft: 161st overall, 1992; Chicago Blackhawks
- Playing career: 1990–2000

Mike Prokopec (born May 17, 1974) is a Canadian former professional ice hockey forward.

== Biography ==
Prokopec was born in Toronto, Ontario, Canada. As a youth, he played in the 1988 Quebec International Pee-Wee Hockey Tournament with a minor ice hockey team from Barrie, Ontario. He later played 15 games in the National Hockey League for the Chicago Blackhawks.

== Career statistics ==
			Regular season					Playoffs
Season	Team	League	GP	G	A	Pts	PIM	GP	G	A	Pts	PIM
1990–91	Barrie Colts	COJHL	39	17	20	37	63	—	—	—	—	—
1991–92	Cornwall Royals	OHL	59	12	15	27	75	6	0	0	0	0
1992–93	Newmarket Royals	OHL	40	6	14	20	70	—	—	—	—	—
1992–93	Guelph Storm	OHL	28	10	14	24	27	5	1	0	1	14
1993–94	Guelph Storm	OHL	66	52	58	110	93	9	12	4	16	17
1994–95	Indianapolis Ice	IHL	70	21	12	33	80	—	—	—	—	—
1995–96	Chicago Blackhawks	NHL	9	0	0	0	5	—	—	—	—	—
1995–96	Indianapolis Ice	IHL	67	18	22	40	131	5	2	0	2	4
1996–97	Chicago Blackhawks	NHL	6	0	0	0	6	—	—	—	—	—
1996–97	Indianapolis Ice	IHL	57	13	18	31	143	—	—	—	—	—
1996–97	Detroit Vipers	IHL	3	2	0	2	4	8	2	1	3	14
1997–98	Worcester IceCats	AHL	62	21	25	46	112	11	1	2	3	10
1998–99	Detroit Vipers	IHL	75	25	28	53	125	10	3	6	9	26
1999–00	Manitoba Moose	IHL	68	23	21	44	100	—	—	—	—	—
NHL totals			15	0	0	0	11	—	—	—	—	—
AHL totals			62	21	25	46	112	11	1	2	3	10
