= Newmarket Saints =

Defunct American Hockey League team

- City: Newmarket, Ontario
- League: American Hockey League
- Conference: Western Conference
- Division: North Division
- Operated: 1986–1991
- Home arena: Ray Twinney Complex
- Colours: Blue, white
- Owner: Maple Leaf Gardens Limited
- General manager: Gord Stellick
- Head coach: Paul Gardner (1986–1990); Frank Anzalone (1990–91)
- Affiliates: Toronto Maple Leafs

Franchise history
- 1978–1982: New Brunswick Hawks
- 1982–1986: St. Catharines Saints
- 1986–1991: Newmarket Saints
- 1991–2005: St. John's Maple Leafs
- 2005–present: Toronto Marlies

The Newmarket Saints were a minor league hockey team in Newmarket, Ontario. It played in the American Hockey League from 1986 to 1991 as the farm team of the Toronto Maple Leafs at the Ray Twinney Complex.

After the 1985–86 season, the Toronto Maple Leafs moved their top affiliate from St. Catharines to the Ray Twinney Complex, a recently built arena in Newmarket, north of Toronto.

However, the Ray Twinney Complex was nowhere near adequate for an AHL team, and Newmarket itself was too small at the time for the team to be viable. These factors, combined with the team being barely competitive (only one winning season), led the Leafs to move the Saints to St. John's, Newfoundland and Labrador for the 1991–92 season where they became the St. John's Maple Leafs. The void in Newmarket would be filled by the Newmarket Royals of the OHL.

The franchise was replaced by:

- OHL Newmarket Royals (1991–1994) - moved from Cornwall, now Sarnia Sting
- OHA Junior A Newmarket Hurricanes

== Alumni ==
Former players include:

- Tim Bernhardt
- Allan Bester
- Tie Domi
- Alan Hepple
- John Kordic
- Garry Lariviere
- Bob McGill
- Chris McRae
- Barry Melrose
- Jim Ralph
- Jeff Reese

=== American Hockey League Hall of Famers ===
AHL Hall of Fame Honored Members
Name	Seasons	Induction Year
Bruce Boudreau	1988-89 (player)	2009

== Season-by-season results ==
=== Regular season ===
Season	Games	Won	Lost	Tied	OTL	Points	Goals for	Goals against	Standing
1986–87	80	28	48	—	4	60	226	337	7th, South
1987–88	80	33	33	8	6	80	282	328	6th, South
1988–89	80	38	36	6	—	82	339	334	4th, South
1989–90	80	31	33	16	—	78	305	318	5th, South
1990–91	80	26	45	9	—	61	278	317	8th, South

=== Playoffs ===
Season	1st round	2nd round	Finals
1986–87	Out of Playoffs		
1987–88	Out of Playoffs		
1988–89	L, 1–4, Adirondack	—	—
1989–90	Out of Playoffs		
1990–91	Out of Playoffs		

== Team records ==
=== Single Season ===
Goals: Marty Dallman – 50
Assists: Wes Jarvis – 59
Points: Marty Dallman – 89
Penalty minutes: Tie Domi – 187
GAA: Allan Bester – 2.87
SV%: Serafin Fernandez – .927

=== Career ===
Goals: Marty Dallman – 100
Assists: Wes Jarvis – 162
Points: Wes Jarvis – 250
Penalty minutes: Brian Blad – 250
Goaltending wins:
Shutouts:
Games played: Wes Jarvis – 237

== See also ==
- List of ice hockey teams in Ontario
