= Derek Grant (ice hockey, born 1974) =

Canadian ice hockey player

- Born: March 18, 1974 (age 51); Cornwall, Ontario, Canada
- Height: 6 ft 0 in (183 cm)
- Weight: 185 lb (84 kg; 13 st 3 lb)
- Position: Centre
- Shot: Right
- Played for: AHL; Adirondack Red Wings; ECHL; South Carolina Stingrays; CHL; Memphis RiverKings; Macon Whoopee; Indianapolis Ice
- NHL draft: Undrafted
- Playing career: 1994–2001

Derek Grant (born March 18, 1974) is a Canadian retired professional ice hockey player.

== Early life ==
Born in 1974 in Cornwall, Ontario, Grant played three seasons in the Ontario Hockey League with the Newmarket Royals, Niagara Falls Thunder, and Ottawa 67's.

== Career ==
Grant made his professional debut during the 1994–95 AHL season with the Adirondack Red Wings of the American Hockey League. He joined the Memphis RiverKings of the Central Hockey League (CHL) for the 1995–96 CHL season, where he won the CHL Rookie of the Year Trophy. Grant remained with the RiverKings for another five seasons, and retired from professional hockey following the 2000–01 CHL season.

In December 2007, as part of the team's 1,000th game celebration, Grant was selected as a member of the All RiverKIngs Team.

== Career statistics ==
			Regular season					Playoffs
Season	Team	League	GP	G	A	Pts	PIM	GP	G	A	Pts	PIM
1992–93	Newmarket Royals	OHL	60	11	24	35	14	7	0	2	2	2
1993–94	Newmarket Royals	OHL	12	2	10	12	8	—	—	—	—	—
1993–94	Niagara Falls Thunder	OHL	47	30	33	63	333	—	—	—	—	—
1994–95	Adirondack Red Wings	AHL	4	0	0	0	15	—	—	—	—	—
1994–95	Ottawa 67's	OHL	42	22	40	62	14	—	—	—	—	—
1994–95	South Carolina Stingrays	ECHL	—	—	—	—	—	3	1	2	3	4
1995–96	Memphis RiverKings	CHL	52	39	53	92	25	6	5	4	9	8
1995–96	South Carolina Stingrays	ECHL	2	0	0	0	2	—	—	—	—	—
1996–97	Memphis RiverKings	CHL	59	35	42	77	59	18	7	10	17	6
1997–98	Memphis RiverKings	CHL	55	23	44	67	60	4	2	4	6	0
1998–99	Memphis RiverKings	CHL	65	45	78	123	45	4	0	4	4	8
1999–00	Memphis RiverKings	CHL	63	33	35	68	73	—	—	—	—	—
2000–01	Memphis RiverKings	CHL	23	21	20	41	14	—	—	—	—	—
2000–01	Macon Whoopee	CHL	14	5	8	13	62	—	—	—	—	—
2000–01	Indianapolis Ice	CHL	10	4	11	15	23	—	—	—	—	—
AHL totals			4	0	0	0	15	—	—	—	—	—
ECHL totals			2	0	0	0	2	3	1	2	3	4
CHL totals			341	205	291	496	361	32	14	22	36	22

== Awards and honours ==
Award	Year
CHL Rookie of the Year	1995–96
CHL Leading Points Scorer - Ken McKenzie Trophy	1998–99
