= Fred Brathwaite =

Canadian ice hockey player, coach (born 1972)

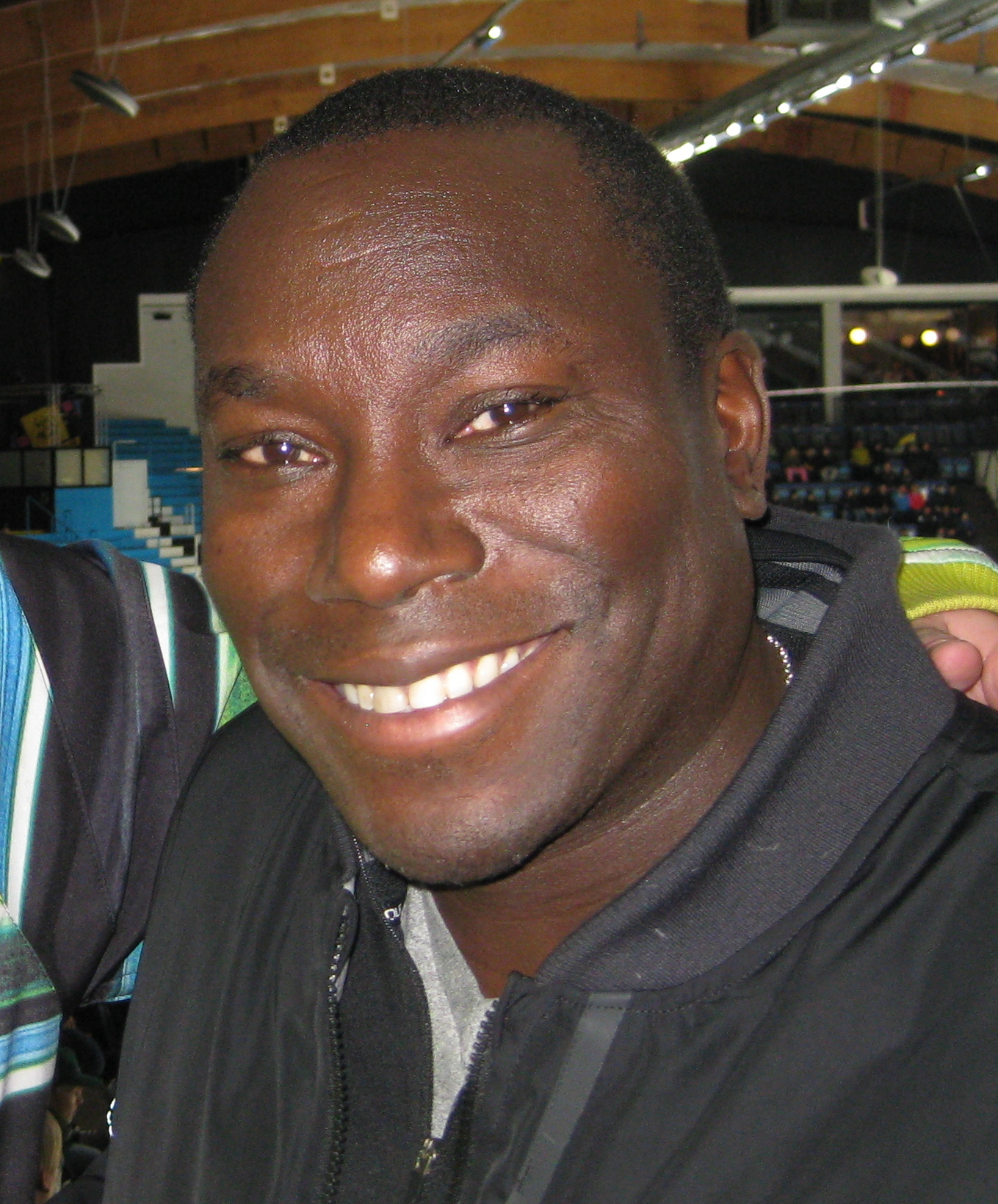
- Born: November 24, 1972 (age 53) Ottawa, Ontario, Canada
- Height: 5 ft 7 in (170 cm)
- Weight: 185 lb (84 kg; 13 st 3 lb)
- Position: Goaltender
- Caught: Left
- Played for: Edmonton Oilers; Calgary Flames; St. Louis Blues; Columbus Blue Jackets; Ak Bars Kazan; Avangard Omsk; Adler Mannheim
- National team: Canada
- NHL draft: Undrafted
- Playing career: 1993–2014

Fredrick Brathwaite (born November 24, 1972) is a Canadian ice hockey coach and former player.

Brathwaite played as a goaltender, and spent his career with the Edmonton Oilers, Calgary Flames, St. Louis Blues and Columbus Blue Jackets in the NHL before finishing his career overseas with Ak Bars Kazan, Avangard Omsk and Adler Mannheim. Brathwaite was named Deutsche Eishockey Liga MVP in 2009.

== Playing career ==
Following junior hockey with the Orillia Travelways/Orillia Laidlaw, Brathwaite played major junior for the Oshawa Generals, London Knights and Detroit Jr. Red Wings in the Ontario Hockey League (OHL). Undrafted, he was signed by the Edmonton Oilers in 1993. He played in the Oilers' system for three seasons between the NHL and Edmonton's American Hockey League (AHL) affiliate, the Cape Breton Oilers.

In 1996–97, Brathwaite began a two-season stint with the Manitoba Moose of the International Hockey League (IHL). In his first season with the Moose, he scored a rare goal as a goaltender November 9, 1996.

Brathwaite began the 1998–99 season on the Canadian National Team before being signed by the Calgary Flames. He appeared in 28 games, recording a 2.45 goals against average and .915 save percentage in what qualified as his NHL rookie season. He remained with the Flames for two more seasons until he was traded to the St. Louis Blues by general manager Craig Button as part of a deal for goaltender Roman Turek in the 2001 off-season. He played with the Blues for two seasons as a backup before being signed by the Columbus Blue Jackets for the 2003–04. In his sole season with the Blue Jackets, he backed up Marc Denis while also spending time in the AHL with the Syracuse Crunch.

Due to the 2004–05 NHL lockout, Brathwaite played overseas in the Russian Superleague for Ak-Bars Kazan. He remained there for two seasons until returning to North America to play in the AHL for the Chicago Wolves. After two seasons in Chicago, Brathwaite went back to Europe to join Adler Mannheim of the German Deutsche Eishockey Liga. In his first season in Germany, Brathwaite reeled off a 2.37 GAA, .925 save percentage performance to be named the German league's 2009 MVP.

== Coaching career ==
After his playing career, he worked as goaltending coach of German team Adler Mannheim and served as Hockey Canada's goaltending consultant.

On July 10, 2017, the New York Islanders announced that Brathwaite was hired as goaltending coach. He was replaced on July 25, 2018, by Piero Greco.

On January 17, 2021, Brathwaite was hired as goaltending coach for the Henderson Silver Knights prior to their inaugural season. On April 24, 2021, with starting goaltender Logan Thompson unavailable, Brathwaite dressed as backup goaltender for the Silver Knights at 48 years of age.

== Personal life ==
Brathwaite was born in Ottawa, Ontario to parents who had emigrated to Canada from Barbados in 1964. He appeared in the Jermaine Dupri rap video "Welcome to Atlanta" with the rappers the St. Lunatics. The scene was shot at Busch Stadium in St. Louis.

== Career statistics ==
=== Regular season and playoffs ===
			Regular season										Playoffs
Season	Team	League	GP	W	L	T	OTL	MIN	GA	SO	GAA	SV%	GP	W	L	MIN	GA	SO	GAA	SV%
1988–89	Smiths Falls Bears	CJHL	38	16	18	1	—	2130	187	0	5.27	—	—	—	—	—	—	—	—	—
1989–90	Orillia Terriers	COJHL	15	—	—	—	—	782	47	0	3.61	—	—	—	—	—	—	—	—	—
1989–90	Oshawa Generals	OHL	20	11	2	1	—	886	43	1	2.91	.897	10	4	2	451	22	0	2.93	—
1989–90	Oshawa Generals	MC	—	—	—	—	—	—	—	—	—	—	1	1	0	52	1	0	1.15	—
1990–91	Oshawa Generals	OHL	39	25	6	3	—	1986	112	1	3.38	.897	13	9	2	677	43	0	3.81	—
1991–92	Oshawa Generals	OHL	24	12	7	2	—	1248	81	0	3.89	.885	—	—	—	—	—	—	—	—
1991–92	London Knights	OHL	23	15	6	2	—	1325	61	4	2.76	.908	10	5	5	615	36	0	3.51	—
1992–93	Detroit Jr. Red Wings	OHL	37	23	10	4	—	2192	134	0	3.67	—	15	9	6	858	48	1	3.36	—
1993–94	Edmonton Oilers	NHL	19	3	10	3	—	982	58	0	3.54	.889	—	—	—	—	—	—	—	—
1993–94	Cape Breton Oilers	AHL	2	1	1	0	—	119	6	0	3.04	.880	—	—	—	—	—	—	—	—
1994–95	Edmonton Oilers	NHL	14	2	5	1	—	601	40	0	4.00	.863	—	—	—	—	—	—	—	—
1995–96	Edmonton Oilers	NHL	7	0	2	0	—	293	12	0	2.45	.914	—	—	—	—	—	—	—	—
1995–96	Cape Breton Oilers	AHL	31	12	16	0	—	1699	110	1	3.88	.872	—	—	—	—	—	—	—	—
1996–97	Manitoba Moose	IHL	58	22	22	5	—	2945	167	1	3.40	.901	—	—	—	—	—	—	—	—
1997–98	Manitoba Moose	IHL	51	23	18	4	—	2736	138	1	3.03	.908	2	0	1	72	4	0	3.33	.905
1998–99	Canada	Intl	24	6	8	3	—	989	47	—	2.85	.915	—	—	—	—	—	—	—	—
1998–99	Calgary Flames	NHL	28	11	9	7	—	1663	68	1	2.45	.915	—	—	—	—	—	—	—	—
1999–00	Calgary Flames	NHL	61	25	25	7	—	3448	158	5	2.75	.905	—	—	—	—	—	—	—	—
1999–00	Saint John Flames	AHL	2	2	0	0	—	120	4	0	2.00	.943	—	—	—	—	—	—	—	—
2000–01	Calgary Flames	NHL	49	15	17	10	—	2742	106	5	2.32	.910	—	—	—	—	—	—	—	—
2001–02	St. Louis Blues	NHL	25	9	11	4	—	1446	54	2	2.24	.901	1	0	0	1	0	0	0.00	—
2002–03	St. Louis Blues	NHL	30	12	9	4	—	1615	74	2	2.75	.883	—	—	—	—	—	—	—	—
2003–04	Columbus Blue Jackets	NHL	21	4	11	1	—	1050	59	0	3.37	.897	—	—	—	—	—	—	—	—
2003–04	Syracuse Crunch	AHL	3	0	2	1	—	188	7	1	2.23	.924	—	—	—	—	—	—	—	—
2004–05	Ak Bars Kazan	RSL	34	—	—	—	—	1958	61	9	1.87	.911	2	—	—	128	2	1	0.94	.960
2005–06	Ak Bars Kazan	RSL	32	—	—	—	—	1866	66	6	2.12	.900	11	—	—	623	16	1	1.54	.923
2006–07	Chicago Wolves	AHL	40	22	13	—	5	2410	110	2	2.74	.902	5	1	3	260	7	1	1.62	.944
2007–08	Chicago Wolves	AHL	13	10	2	—	0	769	32	0	2.50	.918	—	—	—	—	—	—	—	—
2007–08	Avangard Omsk	RSL	18	—	—	—	—	1015	45	1	2.66	.902	4	—	—	256	12	0	2.81	.904
2008–09	Adler Mannheim	DEL	49	27	22	—	—	2880	114	6	2.37	.925	9	5	4	539	24	1	2.67	.923
2009–10	Adler Mannheim	DEL	47	21	25	—	—	2756	133	4	2.90	.914	2	0	2	119	7	0	3.54	.897
2010–11	Adler Mannheim	DEL	49	25	24	—	—	2974	124	3	2.50	.918	6	3	3	358	15	0	2.52	.893
2011–12	Adler Mannheim	DEL	40	—	—	—	—	—	—	—	2.61	.924	14	—	—	—	—	—	1.86	.942
RSL totals			84	—	—	—	—	4839	172	16	2.13	—	17	—	—	1007	30	2	1.79	—
NHL totals			254	81	99	37	—	13,840	629	15	2.73	.901	1	0	0	1	0	0	0.00	—

=== International ===
Year	Team	Event	GP	W	L	T	MIN	GA	SO	GAA	SV%
1999	Canada	WC	DNP	—	—	—	—	—	—	—	—
2000	Canada	WC	1	0	1	0	59	4	0	4.07	.846
2001	Canada	WC	6				335	13	1	2.33	.901
Senior totals			7	—	—	—	394	17	1	2.59	.891

== See also ==
- List of black NHL players
