= Eric Cairns =

Canadian ice hockey player (born 1974)

- Born: June 27, 1974 (age 52) Oakville, Ontario, Canada
- Height: 6 ft 6 in (198 cm)
- Weight: 245 lb (111 kg; 17 st 7 lb)
- Position: Defence
- Shot: Left
- Played for: New York Rangers; New York Islanders; London Racers; Florida Panthers; Pittsburgh Penguins
- NHL draft: 72nd overall, 1992; New York Rangers
- Playing career: 1996–2007

Eric Cairns (born June 27, 1974) is a Canadian former ice hockey defenceman and current director of player development for the New York Islanders. His last season (2006) was with the Pittsburgh Penguins of the NHL.

== Playing career ==
Cairns was drafted in the third round of the 1992 NHL entry draft by the New York Rangers. He began his second year of professional hockey with the Charlotte Checkers in the ECHL where he played 14 games before the Rangers promoted him to the Binghamton Rangers of the AHL. A year later he was playing in the NHL with the New York Rangers, where he spent several seasons before being placed on waivers. The Rangers' crosstown rivals, the New York Islanders, claimed Cairns on December 22, 1998. He played six seasons with the team before they declined to renew his contract. After the 2004–05 NHL lockout the Florida Panthers signed him as a free agent. Cairns was then traded to the Penguins mid-season. He missed most of the 2006–2007 season with post-concussion syndrome and various other injuries.

Cairns, an enforcer, received less playing time in his last year of play as the enforcer role became less prominent in the post-lockout NHL. Since entering the league in the 1996–1997 season with the Rangers, Cairns accumulated 1,117 penalty minutes, 10 goals, and 32 assists.

=== Islanders-Rangers rivalry ===
During his tenure with the Islanders, Cairns was actively involved in the team's rivalry with the Rangers, particularly feuding with Theo Fleury, Sandy McCarthy, Matthew Barnaby and Dale Purinton. In a game on November 8, 2001, McCarthy challenged Cairns to a fight; initially, Cairns declined, but he later chased McCarthy down the ice into the Islanders' zone. During this time, McCarthy scored on a rebound. As McCarthy celebrated, Cairns gave him a jab to the jaw, which led to a fight between Cairns and Steve McKenna. Afterward, with Cairns in the penalty box, Fleury mocked him by flapping his arms like a chicken to suggest that Cairns was afraid to fight McCarthy, who flexed his biceps and looked at Cairns. In the next game between the two teams, on December 21, Cairns and McCarthy fought at the beginning of the first period following an early Islanders goal. Cairns won the fight, and McCarthy said of him after the game, "I never said he wasn't a tough guy."

In another incident on February 19, 2004, Dale Purinton beat Cairns in a fight and punched him after he was down on the ice. The rest of the game included a number of fights. Cairns called Purinton "gutless." A week later, on February 26, the Islanders and Rangers again faced off. Cairns and Purinton came together, and as Cairns began to throw punches, Purinton elbowed Cairns in the face before Purinton dropped to the ice and turtled. Cairns let Purinton get up and challenged him, but Purinton refused to fight. Barry Melrose criticized Purinton for declining the chance to fight Cairns in a fair match.

=== London Racers incident ===
During the lockout, Cairns played for the London Racers. On March 23, 2005, he was involved in a notorious fight with Wade Belak (playing for Coventry Blaze), during which he punched a linesman. Cairns was called initially for a slashing major against Andre Payette and then threw a punch at an official who was escorting him to the penalty box. Cairns skated around the rink for about a minute threatening the officials, unable to lose his teammates who were attempting to ensure he did not further escalate the incident. Instead of leaving the ice, Cairns instead skated to the Coventry bench where he threw a punch which resulted in a bench-clearing brawl. He was suspended for the remainder of the season and the entire next season in all IIHF tournaments, although the NHL allowed him to return the following year.

=== Pittsburgh Penguins ===
Cairns was acquired from Florida Panthers in January 2006 to strengthen the Penguins' defense and protect Sidney Crosby. Coincidentally, Cairns started with a goal against the New York Islanders.

== Post-playing career ==
Cairns was the Director of Player Development for the New York Islanders from 2013. As of June 24, 2026, he is no longer in that role having been replaced by Pascal Dupuis.

== Career statistics ==
			Regular season					Playoffs
Season	Team	League	GP	G	A	Pts	PIM	GP	G	A	Pts	PIM
1990–91	Burlington Cougars	CJHL	37	5	16	21	120	—	—	—	—	—
1991–92	Detroit Compuware Ambassadors	OHL	64	1	11	12	237	7	0	0	0	31
1992–93	Detroit Jr. Red Wings	OHL	64	3	13	16	194	15	0	3	3	24
1993–94	Detroit Jr. Red Wings	OHL	59	7	35	42	204	17	0	4	4	46
1994–95	Birmingham Bulls	ECHL	11	1	3	4	49	—	—	—	—	—
1994–95	Binghamton Rangers	AHL	27	0	3	3	134	9	1	1	2	28
1995–96	Binghamton Rangers	AHL	46	1	13	14	192	4	0	0	0	37
1995–96	Charlotte Checkers	ECHL	6	0	1	1	34	—	—	—	—	—
1996–97	New York Rangers	NHL	40	0	1	1	147	3	0	0	0	0
1996–97	Binghamton Rangers	AHL	10	1	1	2	96	—	—	—	—	—
1997–98	New York Rangers	NHL	39	0	3	3	92	—	—	—	—	—
1997–98	Hartford Wolf Pack	AHL	7	1	2	3	43	—	—	—	—	—
1998–99	New York Islanders	NHL	9	0	3	3	23	—	—	—	—	—
1998–99	Hartford Wolf Pack	AHL	11	0	2	2	49	—	—	—	—	—
1998–99	Lowell Lock Monsters	AHL	24	0	0	0	91	3	1	0	1	32
1999–2000	New York Islanders	NHL	67	2	7	9	196	—	—	—	—	—
1999–2000	Providence Bruins	AHL	4	1	1	2	14	—	—	—	—	—
2000–01	New York Islanders	NHL	45	2	2	4	106	—	—	—	—	—
2001–02	New York Islanders	NHL	74	2	5	7	176	7	0	0	0	15
2002–03	New York Islanders	NHL	60	1	4	5	124	5	0	0	0	13
2003–04	New York Islanders	NHL	72	2	6	8	189	1	0	0	0	0
2004–05	London Racers	EIHL	22	2	6	8	85	2	0	0	0	27
2005–06	Florida Panthers	NHL	23	0	1	1	37	—	—	—	—	—
2005–06	Pittsburgh Penguins	NHL	27	1	0	1	87	—	—	—	—	—
2006–07	Pittsburgh Penguins	NHL	1	0	0	0	5	—	—	—	—	—
2006–07	Wilkes–Barre/Scranton Penguins	AHL	2	0	0	0	10	—	—	—	—	—
NHL totals			457	10	32	42	1182	16	0	0	0	28
