= Detroit Junior Red Wings =

American junior ice hockey team (1992–1995)

- City: Detroit, Michigan
- League: Ontario Hockey League
- Operated: 1992–1995
- Home arena: Joe Louis Arena
- Colors: Red and white

Franchise history
- 1990–1992: Detroit Compuware Ambassadors
- 1992–1995: Detroit Junior Red Wings
- 1995–1997: Detroit Whalers
- 1997–2015: Plymouth Whalers
- 2015–present: Flint Firebirds

The Detroit Junior Red Wings were an American junior ice hockey team in the Ontario Hockey League (OHL) based in Detroit for three seasons from 1992 to 1995. The Red Wings won the J. Ross Robertson Cup in the 1994–95 OHL season and placed second at the 1995 Memorial Cup.

== History ==
The Compuware Ambassadors were renamed the Detroit Junior Red Wings in 1992 and played in the same arena as the NHL Detroit Red Wings. The Junior team was the most popular attraction in town during the NHL lockout of 1995, setting attendance records for the Ontario Hockey League and Canadian Hockey League.

After a failed takeover bid by Peter Karmanos to buy the NHL Red Wings from Mike Ilitch, the relationship between the two clubs soured after the season ended. The Jr. Red Wings played for three seasons before severing all ties with the NHL Red Wings and renaming themselves as the Detroit Whalers, in association with the NHL Hartford Whalers, which Karmanos bought in 1994.

=== 1992–93 ===
Former Windsor Compuware Spitfires coach Tom Webster was hired to coach for the 1992–93 season, with Paul Maurice as his assistant coach. Webster worked previously with Jr. Red Wings President Jim Rutherford and owner Peter Karmanos, when Windsor won the OHL title in 1987–88. Webster was returning from NHL coaching duties with the New York Rangers and Los Angeles Kings.

Key acquisitions made to build the team during the season were, defenceman Jamie Allison, forward Kevin Brown, and goalie Fred Brathwaite. Jim Rutherford was chosen OHL Executive of the Year in 1992–93 for his role as team president and general manager in building the expansion franchise into a winning team.

The Jr. Wings played a run-and-gun style game. They were led in scoring by the Junior Production Line featuring, Pat Peake, Bob Wren and Kevin Brown. The trio combined for 163 goals on the season. Todd Harvey also scored 50 goals playing on the second line.

Detroit finished the season with 81 points, and second place in the Emms division tied with Sault Ste. Marie but had less wins with London finishing 10 points behind Detroit but the others finished with 66 points or below. The Junior Red Wings defeated the Guelph Storm in 5 games in the first round of the playoffs, but lost Pat Peake for the rest of the season when he suffered a broken collarbone.

Detroit defeated the rival London Knights in 5 games in second round to play the division champs Sault Ste. Marie Greyhounds in the division finals. The more experienced Greyhounds team won the series in 5 games. The highlight of the round was the game three win, when with only three seconds left and the opposing net empty, goalie Fred Brathwaite set franchise history when he scored a goal.

=== 1993–94 ===
Before the start of the season, assistant coach Paul Maurice was promoted to head coach, when Tom Webster was relieved of his duties after a disagreement in team policies. Maurice brought along an old teammate as his new assistant, close friend Peter DeBoer. The two played together with the Windsor Compuware Spitfires in the mid to late 1980s.

Maurice and Deboer led the Junior Red Wings to their first division title after several years of chasing Sault Ste. Marie who finished with 79 points while the others in the division finished with 70 points or below. Detroit posted a franchise-best record of 42-20-4, second overall in the OHL to the North Bay Centennials. Jim Rutherford was chosen OHL Executive of the Year for the second consecutive year in 1993–94. After the trading deadline, the Junior Wings won 16 of 23 games over the last two months of the regular season to win the Emms Division title.

Detroit got a round bye for the first round but went against the Owen Sound Platers and swept them in the second round. Detroit finally eliminated Sault Ste. Marie Greyhounds in the division finals in 6 games during the playoffs. As Emms Division champions, they moved on to meet the North Bay Centennials in the OHL Finals. Despite leading the series 3 games to 2, Detroit came up short as North Bay came back to win the series and the J. Ross Robertson Cup. Although the team fell short of its ultimate goal, it was a breakthrough season nonetheless.

=== 1994–95 ===
Paul Maurice took over as general manager after Jim Rutherford moved to take over managing the NHL Hartford Whalers. Maurice would continue to serve as the coach in a dual role.

The OHL realigned into three divisions for the 1994–95 season. Detroit would now play in the West Division versus Windsor, London, Sarnia and Sault Ste. Marie. As the season unfolded, the Junior Wings quickly developed into a balanced team that could play the game in many strategic ways. The team finished with a franchise best record of 44-18-4 for 92 points a close call for Windsor who finished with 85 points. It was the best defensive year to date for the team since only Windsor finished above .500, Sarnia finished with 53 points with London finished with 40 points and Sault Ste. Marie finished with 38 points.

Junior hockey in Detroit received a boost when the National Hockey League owners locked out their players until the middle of January. The Jr. Wings set an all-time Canadian Hockey League attendance record when 19,875 packed Joe Louis Arena on February 5, 1995 in a 5-5 tie with Windsor.

NHL scouts regularly attended the OHL games as did Red Wings head coach Scotty Bowman was a regular at the games. Looking to fill gaps in coverage, Red Wing broadcasters Dave Strader and Mickey Redmond broadcast several games for PASS-TV. In addition, The Junior Wings received regular coverage in the Detroit News and Free Press and found a friend in WDIV's Van Earl Wright.

The Junior Wings rolled through the first two rounds of the playoffs, sweeping the London Knights and Peterborough Petes. In the third round versus the Sudbury Wolves, the visiting team won each of the first six games in overtime. Detroit won game seven on May 8, 1995 playing on home ice, scoring an 11-4 victory. The Junior Red Wings defeated the first place Guelph Storm in the league finals to win their first J. Ross Robertson Cup as OHL Champions, and get their first berth in the Memorial Cup Tournament.

=== Memorial Cup 1995 ===
The Canadian Hockey League championship in 1995 was hosted in Kamloops, British Columbia at the Riverside Coliseum. The Junior Red Wings would face off in the Memorial Cup Tournament against the QMJHL champions Hull Olympiques, the WHL finalists Brandon Wheat Kings, and the Kamloops Blazers as hosts and WHL champions.

The Junior Wings finished the round-robin in second place. They defeated Brandon again 2-1 in the semi-final game to advance to the finals against the defending champion Blazers. (Despite an online report that said that Milan Kostolny scored the winning goal, video research revealed that the game-winner was actually scored by Matthew Ball, off of Wade Redden's foot.) Detroit then started the final game versus Kamloops shorthanded, playing without Shayne McCosh (broken wrist); Bryan Berard did play, but with a bad charley horse. The Blazers blew the game open in the second period and went on to win 8-2.

Paul Maurice put the Junior Wings season in perspective:

"I have a picture hanging in my office," Maurice said. "It's not a picture of us winning the championship but a picture of the crowd the day we won (May 8, 1995). It was a real special time and I remember that fondly.

"My time with the Ambassadors and Junior Wings was one of the best times of my life, in terms of coaching. I think probably more so because a lot of people really caught on to junior hockey. I know a lot of those faces I see in the pictures and I remember the people being so loyal..."

== Later years ==
The Detroit Compuware Ambassadors became the Detroit Jr. Red Wings in 1992, despite the fact that Jr. Wings owner Peter Karmanos had an ongoing feud with Detroit Red Wings owner Mike Ilitch. The Jr. Wings even played in the Red Wings' Joe Louis Arena—until the rivalry between Ilitch and Karmanos finally came to a head, and the junior club was evicted in 1995, right after winning the OHL crown. When Karmanos bought the Hartford Whalers, the Jr. Wings became the Detroit Whalers, and played out of the tiny Oak Park Arena, and the Palace of Auburn Hills, which with a capacity of over 20,000. In 1997, Karmanos built his own arena, Compuware Arena in Plymouth, Michigan, and re-dubbed the team the Plymouth Whalers.

== Championships ==
J. Ross Robertson Cup - OHL Champion

- 1993–94 Finalists vs. North Bay Centennials
- 1994–95 Champions vs. Guelph Storm

Division Trophies

- 1993–94 Emms Trophy Emms Division
- 1994–95 Bumbacco Trophy West Division

== Coaches ==
- 1992–93 Tom Webster: Won the 1967–68 Ontario Hockey Association scoring title with the Niagara Falls Flyers, and later played in the National Hockey League and World Hockey Association.
- 1993–94 and 1994–95 Paul Maurice: Played for Tom Webster on the Windsor Compuware Spitfires, and later coached in the National Hockey League.

== Players ==
Pat Peake was the first MVP for the franchise. His # 14 would be retired by the Whalers organization. Cameron Gruich was chosen 3rd in the 2nd round by the Detroit Red Wings in the 1993 NHL entry draft. Todd Harvey was chosen 9th overall by the Dallas Stars in the 1993 NHL entry draft in the first round.

Bryan Berard was the most awarded player for the 1994-95 season in the Canadian Hockey League. He was chosen 1st overall in the first round of the 1995 NHL entry draft by the Ottawa Senators.

=== Award winners ===
- 1992–93 - Pat Peake, Canadian Hockey League Player of the Year, Red Tilson Trophy Most Outstanding Player, William Hanley Trophy Most Sportsmanlike Player
- 1992–93 - Kevin Brown, Jim Mahon Memorial Trophy Top Scoring Right Winger
- 1993–94 - Kevin Brown, Jim Mahon Memorial Trophy Top Scoring Right Winger
- 1994–95 - Bryan Berard, Canadian Hockey League Rookie of the Year; Emms Family Award, OHL Rookie of the Year; Max Kaminsky Trophy, Defenceman of the Year; CHL Top Draft Prospect Award
- 1994–95 - Jason Saal, Hap Emms Memorial Trophy Outstanding Goaltender at Memorial Cup

=== NHL alumni ===
The Detroit Junior Red Wings sent 13 players onto the National Hockey League while only operating for three seasons.

- Jamie Allison
- Bryan Berard
- Fred Brathwaite
- Kevin Brown
- Eric Cairns
- Sean Haggerty
- Todd Harvey
- Eric Manlow
- Jeff Mitchell
- Pat Peake
- Mike Rucinski
- Derek Wilkinson
- Bob Wren

== Season-by-season results ==
Season-by-season results of the Detroit Junior Red Wings:

Legend: GP = Games played, W = Wins, L = Losses, T = Ties, OTL = Overtime losses, SL = Shoot-out losses, Pts = Points, GF = Goals for, GA = Goals against

Memorial Cup champions	OHL champions	OHL finalists

Season	GP	W	L	T	Pts	Win %	GF	GA	Standing	Playoffs
1992–93	66	37	22	7	81	0.614	336	264	2nd Emms	Won divisional quarterfinal (Guelph Storm) 4–1; Won divisional semifinal (London Knights) 4–1; Lost divisional final (Sault Ste. Marie Greyhounds) 4–1
1993–94	66	42	20	4	88	0.667	312	237	1st Emms	Bye divisional quarterfinal Won divisional semifinal (Owen Sound Platers) 4–0; Won divisional final (Sault Ste. Marie Greyhounds) 4–2; Lost OHL championship (North Bay Centennials) 4–3
1994–95	66	44	18	4	92	0.697	306	223	1st West	Won first round (London Knights) 4–0; Won quarterfinal (Peterborough Petes) 4–0; Won semifinal (Sudbury Wolves) 4–3; Won OHL championship (Guelph Storm) 4–2; 2nd place in Memorial Cup round-robin Won Memorial Cup semifinal (Brandon Wheat Kings) 2–1; Lost Memorial Cup final (Kamloops Blazers) 8–2

== Arena ==
The Junior Red Wings played at Joe Louis Arena concurrently with the NHL Detroit Wings. The Junior Red Wings set OHL attendance records for three consecutive years. The Junior Wings set a Canadian Hockey League attendance record at the time, on February 5, 1995, when 19,875 fans packed Joe Louis Arena to see a 5-5 tie with the local rival Windsor Spitfires.
