= Alan Hepple =

Canadian ice hockey player

- Born: August 16, 1963 (age 62) Blaydon, England, United Kingdom
- Height: 5 ft 9 in (175 cm)
- Weight: 200 lb (91 kg; 14 st 4 lb)
- Position: Defence
- Shot: Left
- Played for: New Jersey Devils
- NHL draft: 169th overall, 1982; New Jersey Devils
- Playing career: 1983–1993

Alan Hepple (born August 16, 1963) is a former Canadian professional ice hockey defenceman who is among the rare players born in England to have competed in the National Hockey League.

== Playing career ==
Chosen 169th overall by the New Jersey Devils in the 1982 NHL entry draft, he appeared in three NHL games for the Devils between 1983 and 1986, recording no points and accumulating seven penalty minutes. His professional career primarily took place in the minor leagues from 1983 to 1993, where he played with the Maine Mariners, Utica Devils and Newmarket Saints in the AHL, as well as the San Diego Gulls and Cincinnati Cyclones in the IHL.

== Post-playing career ==
Hepple continued his career in professional hockey by working as a scout for the Nashville Predators from 1997 to 2002, then moved to the Colorado Avalanche in the same capacity for the 2002–03 season. After seven years as a scout with Colorado, he was promoted to assistant Director of Amateur Scouting, a role he held for six seasons before being elevated to Director of Amateur Scouting ahead of the 2015–16 season.

Hepple's long association with the Avalanche came to an end after the 2020–21 season, when the organization chose not to renew his contract following his sixth year serving as Director of Amateur Scouting. This marked the conclusion of a 19-year tenure with the Avalanche, during which he held various roles including scout, assistant director, and head of amateur scouting. He was hired by the Arizona Coyotes to serve as their Director of Professional Scouting, a role he assumed just before the 2021 NHL entry draft.

== Career statistics ==
| | | | Regular season | | | | | Playoffs |
| Season | Team | League | GP | G | A | Pts | PIM | GP | G | A | Pts | PIM |
|---|---|---|---|---|---|---|---|---|---|---|---|---|
| 1979–80 | Owen Sound Kings | MWJHL | 36 | 10 | 18 | 28 | 50 | — | — | — | — | — |
| 1980–81 | Ottawa 67's | OHL | 64 | 3 | 13 | 16 | 110 | 6 | 0 | 1 | 1 | 2 |
| 1981–82 | Ottawa 67's | OHL | 66 | 6 | 22 | 28 | 160 | 17 | 2 | 10 | 12 | 84 |
| 1982–83 | Ottawa 67's | OHL | 64 | 10 | 26 | 36 | 168 | 9 | 2 | 1 | 3 | 24 |
| 1983–84 | Maine Mariners | AHL | 64 | 4 | 23 | 27 | 117 | — | — | — | — | — |
| 1983–84 | New Jersey Devils | NHL | 1 | 0 | 0 | 0 | 7 | — | — | — | — | — |
| 1984–85 | Maine Mariners | AHL | 80 | 7 | 17 | 24 | 125 | 11 | 0 | 3 | 3 | 30 |
| 1984–85 | New Jersey Devils | NHL | 1 | 0 | 0 | 0 | 0 | — | — | — | — | — |
| 1985–86 | Maine Mariners | AHL | 69 | 4 | 21 | 25 | 104 | 5 | 0 | 0 | 0 | 11 |
| 1985–86 | New Jersey Devils | NHL | 1 | 0 | 0 | 0 | 0 | — | — | — | — | — |
| 1986–87 | Maine Mariners | AHL | 74 | 6 | 19 | 25 | 137 | — | — | — | — | — |
| 1987–88 | Utica Devils | AHL | 78 | 3 | 16 | 19 | 213 | — | — | — | — | — |
| 1988–89 | Newmarket Saints | AHL | 72 | 5 | 29 | 34 | 122 | 5 | 0 | 1 | 1 | 23 |
| 1989–90 | Newmarket Saints | AHL | 72 | 6 | 20 | 26 | 90 | — | — | — | — | — |
| 1990–91 | Newmarket Saints | AHL | 76 | 0 | 18 | 18 | 126 | — | — | — | — | — |
| 1991–92 | San Diego Gulls | IHL | 82 | 6 | 35 | 41 | 191 | 4 | 0 | 1 | 1 | 6 |
| 1992–93 | San Diego Gulls | IHL | 10 | 0 | 1 | 1 | 27 | — | — | — | — | — |
| 1992–93 | Cincinnati Cyclones | IHL | 70 | 7 | 31 | 38 | 201 | — | — | — | — | — |
| NHL totals | | | 3 | 0 | 0 | 0 | 7 | — | — | — | — | — |
| AHL totals | | | 585 | 35 | 163 | 198 | 1,034 | 21 | 0 | 4 | 4 | 64 |

== See also ==
- List of National Hockey League players from the United Kingdom
