= Jason Dawe (ice hockey) =

Canadian ice hockey player (born 1973)

- Born: May 29, 1973 (age 52) North York, Ontario, Canada
- Height: 5 ft 10 in (178 cm)
- Weight: 189 lb (86 kg; 13 st 7 lb)
- Position: Right wing
- Shot: Left
- Played for: Buffalo Sabres (1993–1998); New York Islanders (1998); Montreal Canadiens (1998–1999); New York Rangers (1999–2002)
- National team: Canada
- NHL draft: 35th overall, 1991; Buffalo Sabres
- Playing career: 1993–2005

Jason Eric Dawe (born May 29, 1973) is a Canadian former professional ice hockey player.

== Early life ==
Dawe was born in North York and grew up in Scarborough. As a youth, Dawe played in the 1987 Quebec International Pee-Wee Hockey Tournament with the Toronto Young Nationals minor ice hockey team.

Dawe played his junior hockey career with the Peterborough Petes of the Ontario Hockey League, where he compiled 337 points in 241 games and was part of the Petes' Memorial Cup finalist in 1993. During the same season, Dawe joined Team Canada for the 1993 World Junior Championships, where he scored six points in seven games on the way to earning a gold medal.

== Career ==
Dawe was drafted in the second round, 35th overall, by the Buffalo Sabres in the 1991 NHL entry draft.

Dawe split the 1993–94 season between the Sabres and their AHL affiliate, the Rochester Americans, scoring 28 goals in 80 combined games. Following the lockout shortened 1994-95 season, Dawe made the jump to full-time NHL status. In 1995–96, Dawe enjoyed his finest statistical season, compiling 25 goals in 67 games.

Dawe played two more seasons with the Sabres, amassing 81 points in 149 games, before being traded to the New York Islanders near the 1998 trade deadline for left wing Paul Kruse and defenseman Jason Holland. Dawe went on to score just seven more goals in parts of four National Hockey League seasons with the Islanders, Montreal Canadiens and New York Rangers.

During these final seasons in the NHL, Dawe also saw time in the minor leagues, playing for the Milwaukee Admirals of the IHL (1999–2000) and Hartford Wolfpack (1999–2002), Worcester IceCats (2002–2003), and a return stint with the Rochester Americans (2003–2004) of the American Hockey League.

Dawe also skated 15 games for Kärpät of Finland's SM-liiga during the 2003–04 season. His last professional games came during the 2004–05 season with the Charlotte Checkers of the ECHL.

== Career statistics ==
			Regular season					Playoffs
Season	Team	League	GP	G	A	Pts	PIM	GP	G	A	Pts	PIM
1988–89	Don Mills Flyers Midget AAA	MTHL	44	35	28	63	103	—	—	—	—	—
1989–90	Peterborough Petes	OHL	50	15	18	33	19	12	4	7	11	4
1990–91	Peterborough Petes	OHL	66	43	27	70	43	4	3	1	4	0
1991–92	Peterborough Petes	OHL	66	53	55	108	55	4	5	0	5	0
1992–93	Peterborough Petes	OHL	59	58	68	126	80	21	18	33	51	18
1991–92	Rochester Americans	AHL	—	—	—	—	—	3	1	0	1	0
1993–94	Buffalo Sabres	NHL	32	6	7	13	12	6	0	1	1	6
1993–94	Rochester Americans	AHL	48	22	14	36	44	—	—	—	—	—
1994–95	Buffalo Sabres	NHL	42	7	4	11	19	5	2	1	3	6
1994–95	Rochester Americans	AHL	44	27	19	46	24	—	—	—	—	—
1995–96	Buffalo Sabres	NHL	67	25	25	50	33	—	—	—	—	—
1995–96	Rochester Americans	AHL	7	5	4	9	2	—	—	—	—	—
1996–97	Buffalo Sabres	NHL	81	22	26	48	32	11	2	1	3	6
1997–98	Buffalo Sabres	NHL	68	19	17	36	36	—	—	—	—	—
1997–98	New York Islanders	NHL	13	1	2	3	6	—	—	—	—	—
1998–99	New York Islanders	NHL	22	2	3	5	8	—	—	—	—	—
1998–99	Montreal Canadiens	NHL	37	4	5	9	14	—	—	—	—	—
1999–00	New York Rangers	NHL	3	0	1	1	2	—	—	—	—	—
1999–00	Milwaukee Admirals	IHL	41	11	13	24	24	—	—	—	—	—
1999–00	Hartford Wolf Pack	AHL	27	9	9	18	24	21	10	7	17	37
2000–01	Hartford Wolf Pack	AHL	4	2	0	2	2	—	—	—	—	—
2001–02	New York Rangers	NHL	1	0	0	0	0	—	—	—	—	—
2001–02	Hartford Wolf Pack	AHL	79	28	37	65	46	9	4	0	4	10
2002–03	Worcester IceCats	AHL	71	17	28	45	47	3	0	0	0	5
2003–04	Kärpät	Liiga	15	0	1	1	8	—	—	—	—	—
2003–04	Rochester Americans	AHL	41	9	20	29	23	1	0	0	0	0
2004–05	Charlotte Checkers	ECHL	49	13	18	31	24	15	1	6	7	4
NHL totals			366	86	90	176	162	22	4	3	7	18
