= Pat Peake =

American ice hockey player (born 1973)

- Born: May 28, 1973 (age 53) Rochester, Michigan, U.S.
- Height: 6 ft 1 in (185 cm)
- Weight: 190 lb (86 kg; 13 st 8 lb)
- Position: Center
- Shot: Right
- Played for: Washington Capitals
- National team: United States
- NHL draft: 14th overall, 1991; Washington Capitals
- Playing career: 1993–1998

Patrick Michael Peake (born May 28, 1973) is an American former professional ice hockey forward.

Peake was drafted 14th overall by the Washington Capitals in the 1991 NHL entry draft. Peake played 134 career NHL games, scoring 28 goals and 41 assists for 69 points. Peake suffered several serious injuries in his short career; by the end of the 1997–98 NHL season, in which he played only one game, he had retired.

== Playing career ==
As a youth, Peake played in the 1987 Quebec International Pee-Wee Hockey Tournament with a minor ice hockey team from Detroit.

=== Junior ===
Peake was an up-and-coming star during his junior career. Playing in the North American Hockey League in 1989–1990, he scored 33 goals and assisted on 44 goals in just 34 games.

In the next season, he moved to the Ontario Hockey League with the Detroit Compuware Ambassadors (later the Detroit Jr. Red Wings), scoring 90 points (39 goals and 51 assists) in 63 games. The Washington Capitals rewarded him by making him their first-round selection in the 1991 NHL Entry Draft. Still 18 years old at the time, Peake returned to the Ambassadors for the 1991–1992 season and scored 93 points (41 goals, 52 assists) in 53 games. Following an outstanding season, Peake earned the Red Tilson Trophy, as the OHL's Most Outstanding Player of the Year, and was named the CHL Player of the Year.

Peake appeared with the United States team at the 1992 World Junior Ice Hockey Championships scoring five goals and one assist in seven games, and with the Baltimore Skipjacks of the American Hockey League, recording one goal in three games. The 1992–1993 season would be his last, and most successful, in junior; he scored 136 points (58 goals and 78 assists) in just 46 games with the Detroit Jr. Red Wings and also had four goals and nine assists in seven games with the United States team at the 1993 World Junior Ice Hockey Championships.

=== NHL ===
By the 1993–94 season, the Capitals saw fit to promote Peake to the NHL, and he played 51 games with them, scoring 11 goals and 18 assists, with a +1 defensive rating. In the same year, he recorded five assists in four games with Portland, and he played in eight playoff games with the Capitals, recording one assist. In the next season, he was limited to 18 games with the Capitals due to mononucleosis; he had only four points that year (all on assists), plus four points (with one goal) in five games with Portland. The 1995–96 NHL season was his highest-scoring season in the NHL; he scored 17 goals and made 19 assists in 62 games, and had a plus/minus rating of +7. In addition, he made another trip to the playoffs with the Capitals, tallying two goals and one assist in five games.

== Injuries and retirement ==
Peake's career was ended prematurely due to several serious injuries. In a playoff game in 1996, racing to beat Pittsburgh Penguins defenseman J.J. Daigneault for the puck in order to nullify a potential icing call, he shattered his right heel causing him to undergo extensive surgeries and costing him 67 games of the 1996–97 NHL season. He returned in time to play three games with the Portland Pirates, afterwards breaking his right hand, and four games with the Capitals, before suffering a concussion in an automobile accident in a vehicle being driven by teammate Steve Konowalchuk. He remained out for the first 16 games of the 1997–98 NHL season, due to continued pain in his heel. In his lone game with the Capitals in 1997–98, he tore some tendons in his right ankle and never played professionally again. He officially retired from playing professional ice hockey on September 1, 1998.

In a "Where Are They Now?" feature in 2005, the Capitals stated that Peake was working for Newport Sports Management, the agency that represents (as of 2005) 110 NHL players.

Peake's performance in the Ontario Hockey League did not go unrecognized, and his former junior team, then known as the Detroit Compuware Ambassadors, now the Flint Firebirds retired his number 14 from circulation. Peake leads the team in all-time scoring, with 319 career points.

== Post-playing career ==
On February 18, 2016, the Ontario Hockey League appointed Peake as interim assistant coach for the Flint Firebirds.

== Career statistics ==
=== Regular season and playoffs ===
			Regular season					Playoffs
Season	Team	League	GP	G	A	Pts	PIM	GP	G	A	Pts	PIM
1989–90	Detroit Compuware Ambassadors	NAHL	34	33	44	77	48	—	—	—	—	—
1990–91	Detroit Compuware Ambassadors	OHL	63	39	51	90	54	—	—	—	—	—
1991–92	Detroit Compuware Ambassadors	OHL	53	41	52	93	44	7	8	9	17	10
1991–92	Baltimore Skipjacks	AHL	3	1	0	1	4	—	—	—	—	—
1992–93	Detroit Jr. Red Wings	OHL	46	58	78	136	64	2	1	3	4	2
1993–94	Washington Capitals	NHL	49	11	18	29	39	8	0	1	1	8
1993–94	Portland Pirates	AHL	4	0	5	5	2	—	—	—	—	—
1994–95	Washington Capitals	NHL	18	0	4	4	12	—	—	—	—	—
1994–95	Portland Pirates	AHL	5	1	3	4	2	4	0	3	3	6
1995–96	Washington Capitals	NHL	62	17	19	36	46	5	2	1	3	12
1996–97	Washington Capitals	NHL	4	0	0	0	4	—	—	—	—	—
1996–97	Portland Pirates	AHL	3	0	2	2	0	—	—	—	—	—
1997–98	Washington Capitals	NHL	1	0	0	0	4	—	—	—	—	—
NHL totals			134	28	41	69	105	13	2	2	4	20

=== International ===
Medal record

Representing United States

Ice hockey

World Junior Championships
Bronze medal – third place	1992 Germany	

Year	Team	Event	GP	G	A	Pts	PIM
1992	United States	WJC	7	5	1	6	4
1993	United States	WJC	7	4	9	13	18
Junior totals			14	9	10	19	22

Preceded by John Slaney	Washington Capitals first-round draft pick 1991	Succeeded by Trevor Halverson
Preceded by Charles Poulin	CHL Player of the Year; 1993	Succeeded by Jason Allison
