= Bob Wren =

Canadian ice hockey player (born 1974)

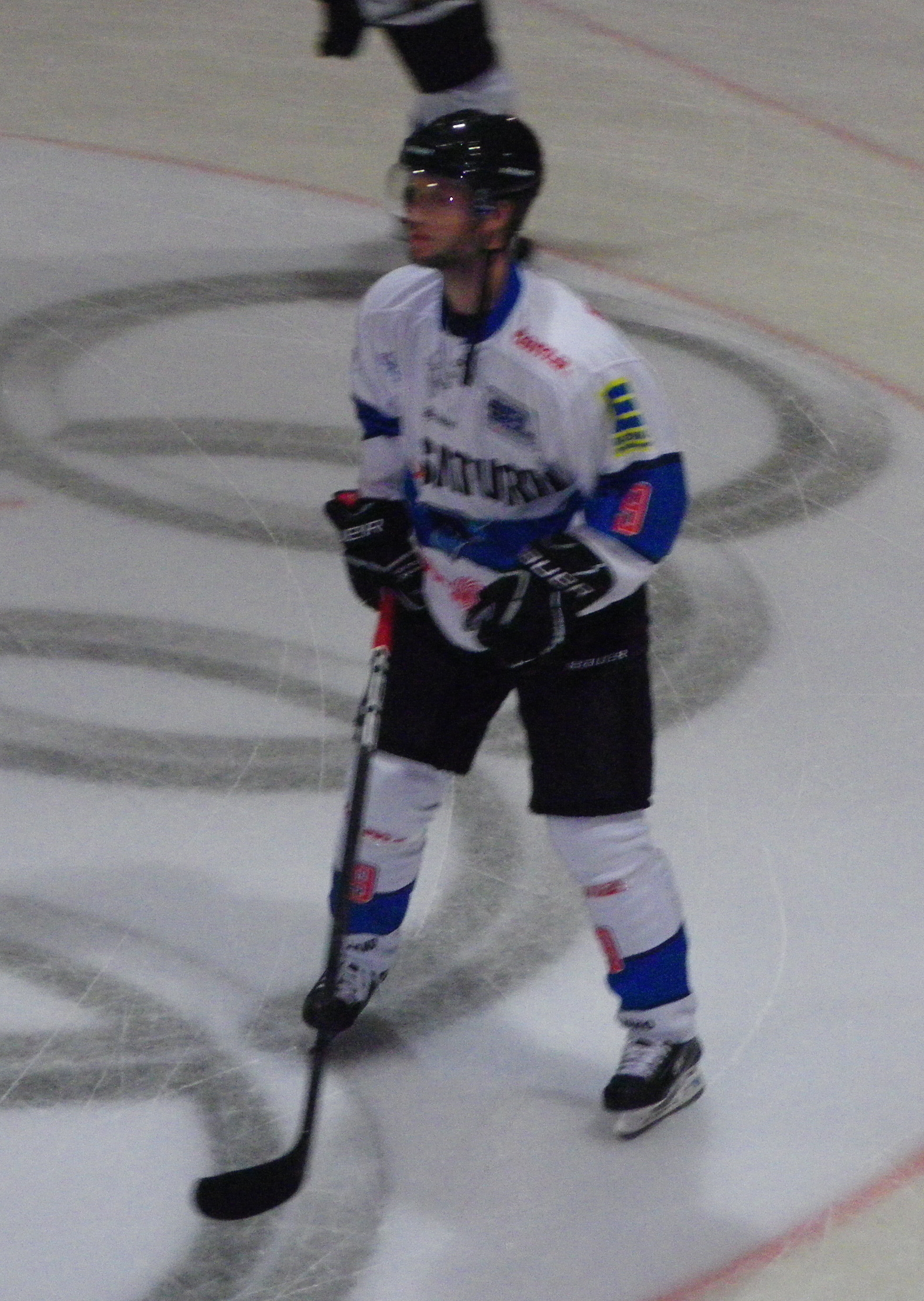
- Born: September 16, 1974 (age 51) Preston, Ontario, Canada
- Height: 5 ft 10 in (178 cm)
- Weight: 180 lb (82 kg; 12 st 12 lb)
- Position: Centre
- Shoots: Left
- Regionalliga team Former teams: EHC Klostersee; Mighty Ducks of Anaheim; Toronto Maple Leafs
- NHL draft: 94th overall, 1993; Los Angeles Kings
- Playing career: 1994–present

Robert "Bob" Wren (born September 16, 1974) is a Canadian former professional ice hockey center who last played for Nottingham Panthers of the Elite Ice Hockey League.

Wren was drafted 94th overall by the Los Angeles Kings in the 1993 NHL entry draft. He played five games in the National Hockey League; four for the Mighty Ducks of Anaheim and one game for the Toronto Maple Leafs, as well as extensively in German and Austrian leagues.

== Career statistics ==
			Regular season					Playoffs
Season	Team	League	GP	G	A	Pts	PIM	GP	G	A	Pts	PIM
1991–92	Detroit Compuware Ambassadors	OHL	62	13	36	49	58	7	3	4	7	19
1992–93	Detroit Jr. Red Wings	OHL	63	57	88	145	91	15	4	11	15	20
1993–94	Detroit Jr. Red Wings	OHL	57	45	64	109	81	17	12	18	30	20
1994–95	Springfield Falcons	AHL	61	16	15	31	118	—	—	—	—	—
1994–95	Richmond Renegades	ECHL	2	0	1	1	0	—	—	—	—	—
1995–96	Knoxville Cherokees	ECHL	50	21	35	56	257	8	4	11	15	32
1995–96	Detroit Vipers	IHL	1	0	0	0	0	—	—	—	—	—
1996–97	Baltimore Bandits	AHL	72	23	36	59	97	3	1	1	2	0
1997–98	Cincinnati Mighty Ducks	AHL	77	42	58	100	151	—	—	—	—	—
1997–98	Mighty Ducks of Anaheim	NHL	3	0	0	0	0	—	—	—	—	—
1998–99	Cincinnati Mighty Ducks	AHL	73	27	43	70	102	3	1	2	3	8
1999–00	Cincinnati Mighty Ducks	AHL	57	24	38	62	61	—	—	—	—	—
2000–01	Cincinnati Mighty Ducks	AHL	70	20	47	67	103	4	4	2	6	2
2000–01	Mighty Ducks of Anaheim	NHL	1	0	0	0	0	—	—	—	—	—
2001–02	St. John's Maple Leafs	AHL	69	24	49	73	83	11	5	7	12	6
2001–02	Toronto Maple Leafs	NHL	1	0	0	0	0	1	0	0	0	0
2002–03	St. John's Maple Leafs	AHL	27	8	11	19	25	—	—	—	—	—
2002–03	Milwaukee Admirals	AHL	16	1	6	7	17	—	—	—	—	—
2002–03	Binghamton Senators	AHL	14	2	12	14	23	14	2	8	10	31
2003–04	Augsburger Panther	DEL	50	19	34	53	84	—	—	—	—	—
2003–04	Vienna Capitals	EBEL	4	1	4	5	0	—	—	—	—	—
2004–05	Vienna Capitals	EBEL	42	14	51	65	40	8	5	2	7	6
2005–06	Vienna Capitals	EBEL	42	22	38	60	110	5	0	5	5	14
2006–07	Vienna Capitals	EBEL	49	29	57	86	172	3	1	6	7	10
2007–08	Iserlohn Roosters	DEL	40	13	36	49	108	7	1	5	6	8
2008–09	Iserlohn Roosters	DEL	51	21	40	61	132	—	—	—	—	—
2009–10	ERC Ingolstadt	DEL	56	16	42	58	82	9	3	4	7	4
2010–11	ERC Ingolstadt	DEL	44	5	17	22	60	3	1	1	2	4
2011–12	Ravensburg Towerstars	GBun.2	43	14	41	55	102	2	0	2	2	2
2012–13	Graz 99ers	EBEL	50	11	29	40	78	5	1	1	2	2
2013–14	Nottingham Panthers	EIHL	17	7	13	20	10	—	—	—	—	—
NHL totals			5	0	0	0	0	1	0	0	0	0
