= Trevor Halverson =

Canadian ice hockey player (born 1971)

- Born: April 6, 1971 (age 55) White River, Ontario, Canada
- Height: 6 ft 1 in (185 cm)
- Weight: 200 lb (91 kg; 14 st 4 lb)
- Position: Left wing
- Shot: Left
- Played for: Washington Capitals
- NHL draft: 21st overall, 1991; Washington Capitals
- Playing career: 1991–1999

Trevor Halverson (born April 6, 1971) is a Canadian former professional ice hockey forward who played in the National Hockey League (NHL) for the Washington Capitals.

== Playing career ==
Selected by the Washington Capitals in the 1991 NHL entry draft, Halverson failed to make the parent team. He was claimed by the Mighty Ducks of Anaheim in the 1993 NHL Expansion Draft, but spent his time mainly in the minors. Halverson returned to the Capitals organization when he signed with them as a free agent in 1998, and finally had the chance to play for the parent team when he played seventeen games during the 1998–99 NHL season. He suffered a career-ending concussion during a September 25, 1999 preseason game against the Chicago Blackhawks.

Halverson was born in White River, Ontario.

== Career statistics ==
			Regular season					Playoffs
Season	Team	League	GP	G	A	Pts	PIM	GP	G	A	Pts	PIM
1987–88	Sault Ste. Marie Elks	Midget	33	29	35	64	34	—	—	—	—	—
1987–88	Thessalon Flyers	NOJHL	2	0	0	0	0	—	—	—	—	—
1988–89	North Bay Centennials	OHL	52	8	10	18	77	—	—	—	—	—
1989–90	North Bay Centennials	OHL	54	22	20	42	162	2	2	1	3	2
1990–91	North Bay Centennials	OHL	64	59	36	95	128	10	3	6	9	4
1991–92	Baltimore Skipjacks	AHL	74	10	11	21	181	—	—	—	—	—
1992–93	Hampton Roads Admirals	ECHL	9	7	5	12	6	—	—	—	—	—
1992–93	Baltimore Skipjacks	AHL	67	19	21	40	170	2	1	0	1	0
1993–94	San Diego Gulls	IHL	58	4	9	13	115	—	—	—	—	—
1993–94	Milwaukee Admirals	IHL	4	1	0	1	8	2	0	0	0	17
1994–95	Hampton Roads Admirals	ECHL	42	14	26	40	194	—	—	—	—	—
1994–95	Portland Pirates	AHL	5	0	1	1	9	—	—	—	—	—
1995–96	Hampton Roads Admirals	ECHL	38	34	27	61	152	—	—	—	—	—
1995–96	Utah Grizzlies	IHL	1	0	1	1	0	—	—	—	—	—
1995–96	Las Vegas Thunder	IHL	22	6	9	15	86	—	—	—	—	—
1995–96	Indianapolis Ice	IHL	12	0	1	1	18	5	0	0	0	4
1995–96	Portland Pirates	AHL	3	0	1	1	0	—	—	—	—	—
1996–97	Portland Pirates	AHL	50	9	8	17	157	3	1	1	2	4
1997–98	Fort Wayne Komets	IHL	14	1	4	5	34	—	—	—	—	—
1997–98	Manitoba Moose	IHL	7	0	1	1	20	—	—	—	—	—
1997–98	Portland Pirates	AHL	43	14	13	27	181	10	2	4	6	20
1998–99	Portland Pirates	AHL	57	24	25	49	153	—	—	—	—	—
1998–99	Washington Capitals	NHL	17	0	4	4	28	—	—	—	—	—
NHL totals			17	0	4	4	28	—	—	—	—	—
AHL totals			299	76	80	156	851	15	4	5	9	24

Preceded by Pat Peake	Washington Capitals first-round draft pick 1991	Succeeded by Sergei Gonchar
