= Ray Twinney =

Ray Twinney (November 1935 - 24 December 1994) was the mayor of Newmarket, Ontario, Canada from 1979 to 1994. Ray Twinney was married to Thelma and fathered two sons. The Newmarket Recreation Complex, officially opened on November 3, 1985, was renamed The Ray Twinney Recreation Complex after Twinney's death.

According to the Hansard of the Legislative Assembly of Ontario: "Twinney arrived in Newmarket in 1960, entering politics in East Gwillimbury in 1965. In 1970 Twinney was elected to Newmarket town council as a regional councillor, serving in that capacity until 1978. In 1979 he was elected mayor of Newmarket and has been returned as mayor each successive council term to the present, making him Newmarket's longest-serving mayor to date, a total of over 15 years."

Twinney was a councillor in East Gwillimbury in the late 1960s, and resided in the southwest portion of the township that became part of Newmarket upon the creation of the Regional Municipality of York in 1971.

Being fond of local organized sport, Ray Twinney owned or co-owned and operated many successful local teams, including the Newmarket Ray's Fastball, Legion Ray's Oldtimers Hockey and the Newmarket Flyers Junior Hockey teams.

In 1988 the dream of a professional-class community recreation centre became a reality under his mayoral leadership. Newmarket's recreation complex, designed by local architect, Fraser Milne, was constructed, becoming the venue for many local sporting events, including AHL and OHL hockey."

Towards the end of Twinney's tenure, questions were raised about some of his business activities in Newmarket, which culminated in a Royal Canadian Mounted Police investigation of them. Grounds were found for laying several charges. However, the trial never took place, as by this time, Twinney had been stricken with terminal cancer. He died shortly afterwards. One of Twinney's sons had also died of cancer that same year.

In 2013 Albert DoCouto pleaded guilty to securities fraud dating back to 2007. Mr DoCouto was once linked to Mayor Twinney after he was charged in May 1993 with breach of trust and offering a secret commission.
