= 1995–96 CHL season =

- League: Central Hockey League
- Sport: Ice hockey

Regular season
- Adams’ Cup: Oklahoma City Blazers
- Season MVP: Brian Shantz (San Antonio)
- Top scorer: Brian Shantz (San Antonio)

Finals
- Champions: Oklahoma City Blazers
- Runners-up: San Antonio Iguanas

CHL seasons
- 1994–95 1996–97

The 1995–96 CHL season was the fourth season of the Central Hockey League (CHL).

== Teams ==
1995-96 Central Hockey League
Team	City	Arena
Fort Worth Fire	Fort Worth, Texas	Fort Worth Convention Center
Memphis RiverKings	Memphis, Tennessee	Mid-South Coliseum
Oklahoma City Blazers	Oklahoma City, Oklahoma	Myriad Convention Center
San Antonio Iguanas	San Antonio, Texas	Freeman Coliseum
Tulsa Oilers	Tulsa, Oklahoma	Tulsa Coliseum
Wichita Thunder	Wichita, Kansas	Britt Brown Arena

== Map of teams ==
Central Hockey League teams

== Regular season ==
=== League standings ===
Central Hockey League	GP	W	L	SOL	GF	GA	Pts
y-Oklahoma City Blazers	64	47	13	4	327	224	98
x-San Antonio Iguanas	64	39	17	8	313	240	86
x-Memphis RiverKings	64	34	24	6	308	271	74
x-Tulsa Oilers	64	26	33	5	244	302	57
e-Fort Worth Fire	64	24	34	6	244	289	54
e-Wichita Thunder	64	22	39	3	270	380	47

Note: y - clinched league title; x - clinched playoff spot; e - eliminated from playoff contention

== Playoffs ==
=== Playoff bracket ===
Ray Miron Cup first round
1	Oklahoma City Blazers	4
4	Tulsa Oilers	2
2	San Antonio Iguanas	4
3	Memphis RiverKings	2

Ray Miron Cup finals
1	Oklahoma City Blazers	4
2	San Antonio Iguanas	3

== CHL awards ==
Ray Miron Cup:	Oklahoma City Blazers
Adams Cup:	Oklahoma City Blazers
Coach of the Year:	Doug Sauter (Oklahoma City)
Most Valuable Player:	Brian Shantz (San Antonio)
Playoff Most Valuable Player:	Jean-Ian Filiatrault (Oklahoma City)
Most Outstanding Goaltender:	Jean-Ian Filiatrault (Oklahoma City)
Most Outstanding Defenseman	Dan Brown (Memphis)
Rookie of the Year	Derek Grant (Memphis)
Scoring Champion	Brian Shantz (San Antonio)

== Player statistics ==
=== Scoring leaders ===
Note: GP = Games played; G = Goals; A = Assists; Pts = Points; PIM = Penalty minutes

Player	Team	GP	G	A	Pts	PIM
Brian Shantz	San Antonio Iguanas	64	54	85	139	90
Paul Jackson	San Antonio Iguanas	62	50	65	115	184
Kyle Reeves	Fort Worth Fire	63	68	47	115	179
George Dupont	Oklahoma City Blazers	61	28	83	111	274
Joe Burton	Oklahoma City Blazers	64	66	32	98	53
Derek Grant	Memphis RiverKings	52	39	53	92	25
Chris Robertson	Tulsa Oilers	54	31	55	86	96
David Shute	San Antonio Iguanas; Wichita Thunder	63	49	33	82	83
Brent Fleetwood	Memphis RiverKings	64	35	42	77	132
Sylvain Naud	Tulsa Oilers	64	32	44	76	107
