= Detroit Compuware Ambassadors =

Junior ice hockey in Detroit (1990–1992)

- City: Detroit, Michigan
- League: Ontario Hockey League
- Founded: December 11, 1989
- Operated: 1990–1992
- Colors: Orange, brown and white
- Affiliates: Compuware Ambassadors

Franchise history
- 1990–1992: Detroit Compuware Ambassadors
- 1992–1995: Detroit Junior Red Wings
- 1995–1997: Detroit Whalers
- 1997–2015: Plymouth Whalers
- 2015–present: Flint Firebirds

The Detroit Compuware Ambassadors were a junior ice hockey team in the Ontario Hockey League for two seasons from 1990 to 1992, based in Detroit, Michigan. The team's owners also operated similarly named teams in the Tier I Elite Hockey League, and the North American Hockey League.

== History ==
The Detroit Compuware Hockey organization was founded in the mid 1970s by Compuware owner/president Peter Karmanos and his partner Thomas Thewes. The organization grew to include all age levels of hockey including Junior 'A'. The Junior 'A 'team competed in the North American Hockey League. Some of its alumni include Eric Lindros, Pat LaFontaine, Mike Modano, Al Iafrate, David Legwand, Derian Hatcher and Doug Weight. The program was so successful that its owners endeavored to expand the Compuware Ambassador program to play at a higher level.

Karmanos had previous experience in the OHL, owning the Windsor Spitfires team during the 1980s that won the J. Ross Robertson Cup in 1988. Karmanos sold the Spitfires in 1989 after a failed attempt to relocate the team across the river. Karmanos also failed in his bid to buy out and relocate the Sault Ste. Marie Greyhounds. Failing which, Karmanos chose the route of an expansion team. The Detroit Compuware Ambassadors were granted as an expansion franchise in the Ontario Hockey League on December 11, 1989. Detroit became the first American-based team in the league. Andy Weidenbach was named the team's first coach. Following Karmanos to Detroit from the Windsor Compuware Spitfires would be team president Jim Rutherford and general manager Tony McDonald.

=== First season ===
Detroit lost its first seven games before posting its first victory, 7-3 over the Owen Sound Platers at Cobo Arena October 4, 1990. After a 3-game win streak, the Ambassadors would drop 11 straight games. Despite the losing, there were some bright lights. First overall draft pick Pat Peake with 39 goals & 51 assists was the team's offensive leader, figuring in over 40 percent of the team's goals.

Despite finishing last overall in the OHL their first season, the Ambassadors executives stuck to the same plan that help bring success to the Spitfires. The Ambassadors earned the reputation as a physical team. Six different players would amass over 100 penalty minutes, including captain Paul Mitton (152 minutes).

=== Second season ===
Detroit used its first overall draft pick in 1991 to select Todd Harvey. The Ambassadors also selected Ryan Sittler (2nd round) and Anson Carter (14th) in the same draft, but both elected to play collegiate hockey.

After dropping five in a row to start the season, Detroit won 7 of its next 9 games to enter November winning half their games. Although the Ambassadors were much improved, Rutherford decided to make a coaching change November 30 after a 7-5 loss in Niagara Falls. Coach Andy Weidenbach was let go. Detroit stood 11-16-0 at the time. Jim Rutherford moved behind the bench to coach the rest of the season. Rutherford played 13 seasons in the NHL as a goalie, spending most of his time with the Detroit Red Wings.

Detroit finished with a record of 23-42-1. Pat Peake led the team in scoring again with 41 goals and 52 assists. Detroit made the last playoff spot in the Emms division finishing 7th place. Detroit bussed to Niagara Falls to start their first-ever playoff series against the second place Thunder. The Ambassadors nearly pulled off a major upset, taking a three-games-to-one lead in the series after a 5-3 victory over Niagara Falls March 19. But the Thunder came back to win the final three games of the series, including game seven in Niagara Falls, 7-2.

After their second season was completed, the Compuware Ambassadors were renamed Detroit Junior Red Wings.

== NHL alumni ==
Pat Peake was the first draft pick in the history of the Compuware Ambassadors franchise, and his #14 was retired by the Whalers organization. Peake was chosen 14th overall in the 1st round of the 1991 NHL entry draft by the Washington Capitals.

Seven players from the Compuware Ambassadors played in the National Hockey League (NHL).

- Eric Cairns
- Todd Harvey
- Mark Lawrence
- Pat Peake
- Keith Redmond
- Derek Wilkinson
- Bob Wren

== Season-by-season results ==
Season-by-season results for the Detroit Compuware Ambassadors:

Legend: GP = Games played, W = Wins, L = Losses, T = Ties, OTL = Overtime losses, SL = Shoot-out losses, Pts = Points, GF = Goals for, GA = Goals against

Memorial Cup champions	OHL champions	OHL runners-up

Season	GP	W	L	T	Pts	Win %	GF	GA	Standing	Playoffs
1990–91	66	11	50	5	27	0.205	213	378	8th Emms	Did not qualify
1991–92	66	23	42	1	47	0.356	279	353	7th Emms	Lost divisional quarterfinal (Niagara Falls Thunder) 4–3

== Uniforms and logos ==
The Compuware Ambassadors colours were brown, orange and white. The logo displays the silhouette of the Ambassador Bridge against the backdrop of downtown Detroit, surrounded by the words compuware in a circle, and the Ambassadors in front.

== Arenas ==
For the 1990–91 season, the Ambassadors played home games at Cobo Arena. During the summer of 1991, Olympia Arenas Inc. decided maintaining ice surfaces at both Cobo Arena and Joe Louis Arena was too costly, so the plug was pulled on Cobo Arena. During the Ambassadors' one season at Cobo, maintenance crews would shuttle zambonis between Cobo Arena and Joe Louis Arena by driving them along the riverfront down Atwater Street.

For the 1991–92 season, the Ambassadors played home games at Joe Louis Arena, the same home arena as the Detroit Red Wings of the National Hockey League.
