= Newmarket Royals =

Canadian junior ice hockey team (1992–1994)

- City: Newmarket, Ontario
- League: Ontario Hockey League
- Division: Leyden
- Operated: 1992–1994
- Home arena: Newmarket Recreational Complex
- Colours: Blue, white and red

Franchise history
- 1969–1992: Cornwall Royals
- 1992–1994: Newmarket Royals
- 1994–present: Sarnia Sting

The Newmarket Royals were a junior ice hockey team in the Ontario Hockey League from 1992 to 1994. They were based in Newmarket, Ontario, Canada, at the Newmarket Recreational Complex.

== History ==
The Royals franchise started in 1969 as the Cornwall Royals in the Quebec Major Junior Hockey League, where they won the Memorial Cup in 1972, 1980, and in 1981. Playing in the Ontario Hockey League since 1981, the Cornwall Royals moved to Newmarket, Ontario to play as the Newmarket Royals for the 1992–93 season.

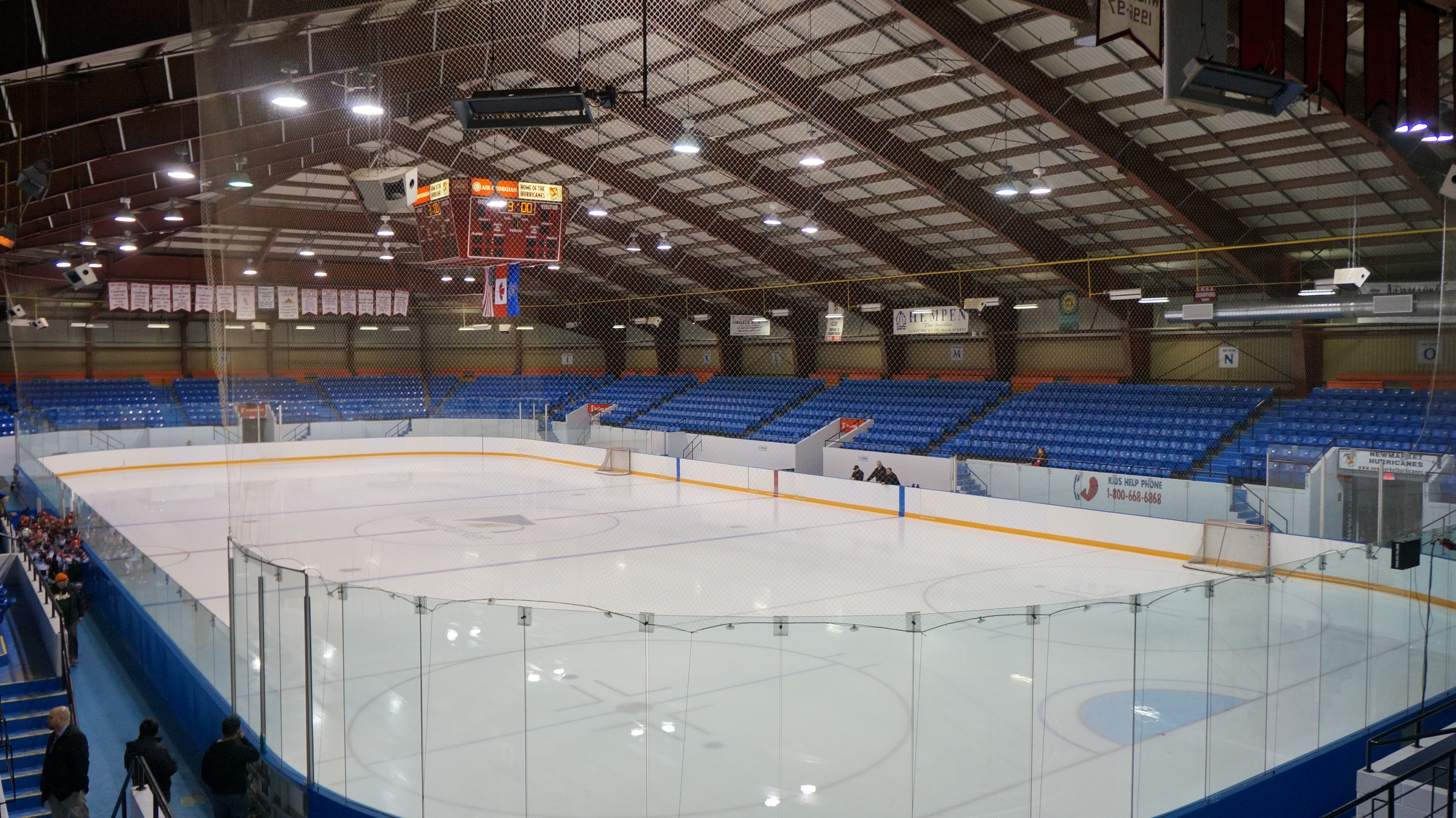
Arena at the Newmarket Recreational Complex

The Royals played home games at the Newmarket Recreational Complex. It was built in 1985, with a capacity of 3,700 seats. The Royals redesigned their logo when the franchise shifted to Newmarket, while keeping the royal blue, white and red colour scheme. The new logo was a horizontal hockey stick above the team's name.

In their first season, the Royals finished fifth place in the Leyden Division with a winning record. In the playoffs, the Royals faced the Sudbury Wolves in a seven game series, won by the Wolves. For every goal the Royals scored at home in the series, a plush wolf with a noose around its neck was dropped from the rafters. This was a move mocking the Sudbury's stuffed wolf that howls at opposing bench whenever the home team Wolves score.

The second Royals season was less successful. The Royals were the only team in OHL and CHL history to go winless in away games for an entire season. The Royals finished last overall in the OHL, 18 points behind the next closest team.

At the start of the 1993–94 season, the team was bought by Dino Ciccarelli and his brothers. After two seasons in Newmarket, the team had lost approximately CDN$700,000, rarely having more than 1,000 spectators per home game. In March 1994, the Ciccarelli brothers moved the team to Sarnia, to become the Sarnia Sting for the 1994–95 season.

== Coaches ==
Both of the coaches of the Newmarket Royals, were former goaltenders. Shawn Mackenzie played in the OHL and briefly for the New Jersey Devils in 1983. He was an assistant coach for the Belleville Bulls prior to coaching the Royals for the 1992–93 season. Don Boyd previously coached the London Knights and the Sault Ste. Marie Greyhounds, before coaching the Royals in the 1993–94 season.

== Players ==
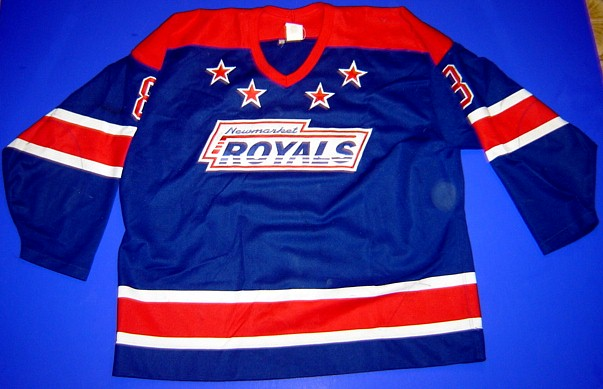
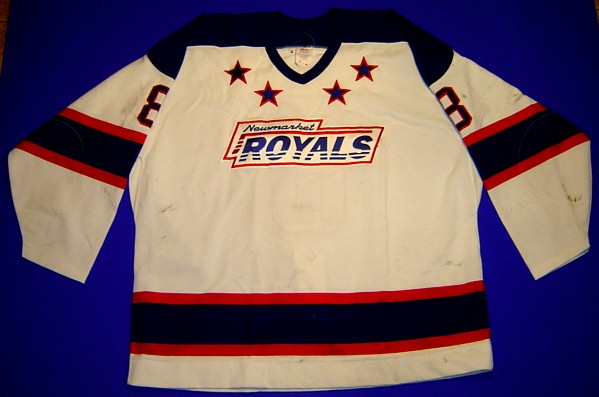
Royals home and away jerseys

In the 1992–93 season, Jeff Reid led the team in scoring 106 points, and Nathan LaFayette led the team with 49 goals scored. After the season, Mark DeSantis was voted a first team OHL all-star, and led all OHL defencemen in goals, assists, and points scored.

Nine alumni of the Royals played in the National Hockey League (NHL):

- Jason Bonsignore
- Larry Courville
- Nathan LaFayette
- Alan Letang
- Grant Marshall
- Mike Prokopec
- Jeremy Stevenson
- Alek Stojanov
- Ryan VandenBussche

Other notable players include Derek Grant and Mikhail Nemirovsky.

== Season-by-season results ==
Regular season and playoffs results:

Season	Games	Wins	Losses	Ties	Win %	Goals for	Goals against	Points	Standing	Playoffs
1992–93	66	29	28	9	67	0.508	310	301	5th in Leyden	Lost division quarterfinals (Sudbury Wolves) 4–3
1993–94	66	9	47	10	28	0.212	231	377	8th in Leyden	did not qualify
