= Ray Twinney Complex =

Arena in Newmarket, Ontario, Canada

Coordinates: 44°2′40″N 79°29′14″W

Ray Twinney Recreation Complex
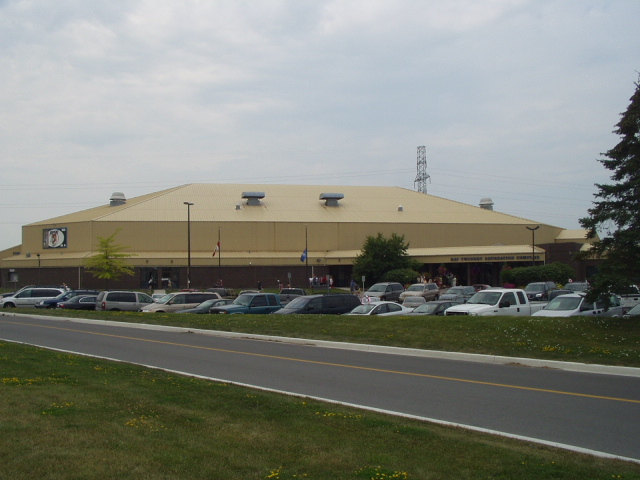
- Entrance of Ray Twinney Complex
- Interactive map of Ray Twinney Recreation Complex
- Former names: Newmarket Recreational Complex (1985-1994)
- Address: 100 Eagle St W, Newmarket, ON; Newmarket, ON; Canada
- Capacity: 3,700 seats

Construction
- Opened: November 3 1985

Tenants
- Newmarket Saints (AHL) (1986-1991); Newmarket Royals (OHL) (1992-1994); Newmarket Hurricanes (OJHL) (1997-2019); Newmarket Redbirds (OJBLL) (2006-present); Newmarket Hurricanes (OJHL) (2025-present)

Ray Twinney Recreation Complex is a multi-purpose recreational facility in the southwest portion of Newmarket, Ontario, built in 1985. The complex was named for former Newmarket mayor Ray Twinney.

The complex includes two, ice pads, a larger one and a smaller one, a swimming pool, which includes a wading pool and a hot tub, a fitness centre, two conference rooms, one lighted outdoor multi-purpose sports field, two soccer pitches, and three baseball/softball diamonds.

The main arena has 3,700 seats. It is the current home of the Newmarket Redbirds of the Ontario Lacrosse Jr. B League, and the Newmarket Hurricanes of the Ontario Junior Hockey League and has also been home to the original Newmarket Hurricanes of the Ontario Provincial Junior A Hockey League, as well as the short-lived Newmarket Royals Ontario Hockey League team in the mid-1990s, and the Newmarket Saints AHL club.

The arena has hosted many events like in 2019, the Toronto Marlies came to town for a preseason game vs Rochester Americans.

There has also been many NHL charity games at the arena.

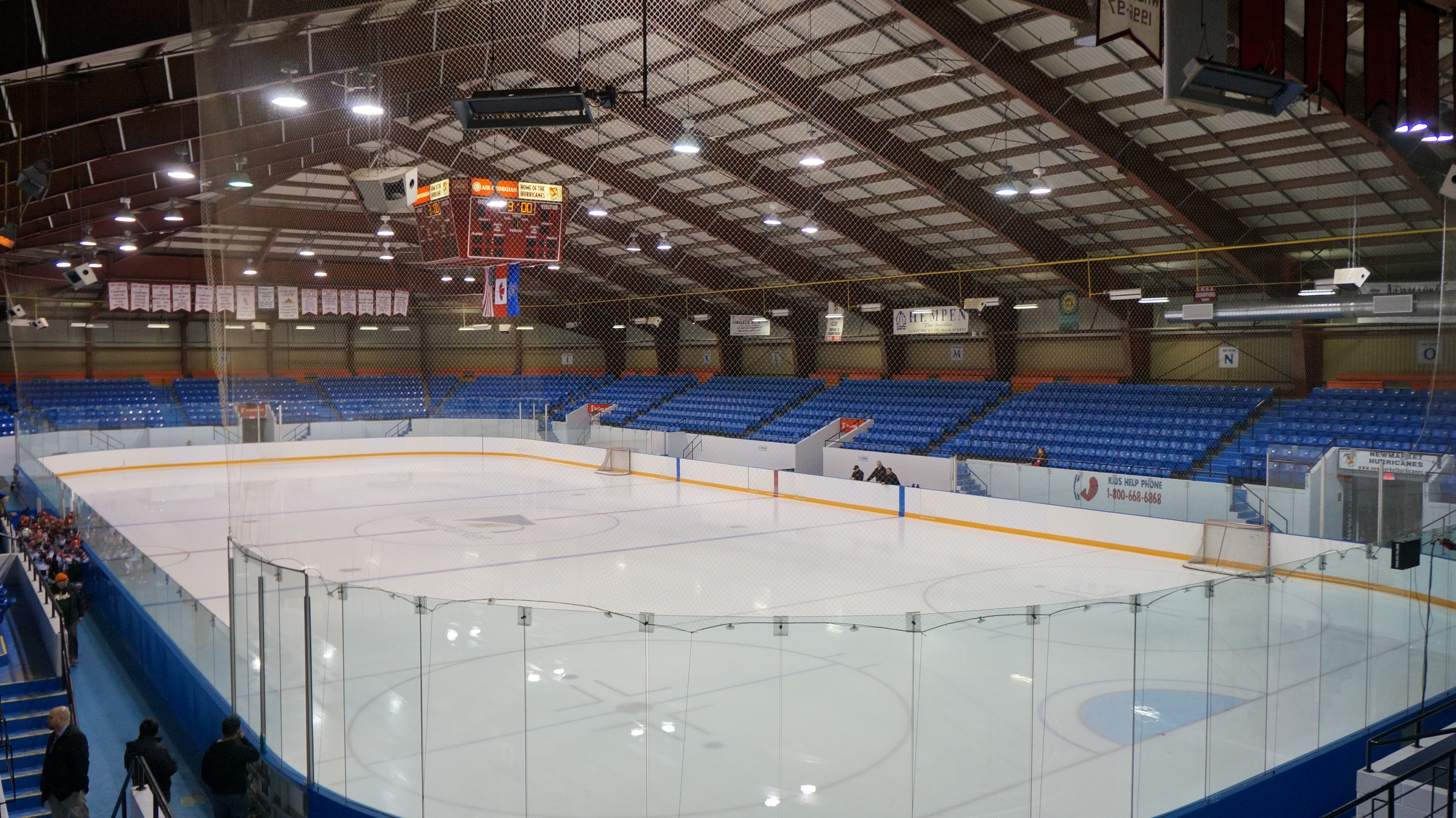
Interior of the main arena.
