= 1992–93 OHL season =

Junior ice hockey season

The 1992–93 OHL season was the 13th season of the Ontario Hockey League. The Cornwall Royals become the Newmarket Royals. The Detroit Compuware Ambassadors are renamed the Detroit Junior Red Wings. The inaugural OHL Humanitarian of the Year is awarded. Sixteen teams each played 66 games. The Peterborough Petes won the J. Ross Robertson Cup, defeating the Sault Ste. Marie Greyhounds.

== Relocation and Rebranding ==
=== Cornwall Royals to Newmarket Royals ===
The Cornwall Royals relocated to the city of Newmarket, Ontario and were named the Newmarket Royals. The team would play at the Newmarket Recreational Complex.

The club was established in 1969 in the Quebec Major Junior Hockey League, as Cornwall won the Memorial Cup three times, in 1972, 1980 and 1981. Prior to the 1981-82, the Royals transferred to the Ontario Hockey League. After joining the OHL, the club was made the post-season in ten of their eleven seasons.

Newmarket would remain in the Leyden Division following the relocation.

=== Detroit Compuware Ambassadors to Detroit Junior Red Wings ===
The Detroit Compuware Ambassadors rebranded their team into the Detroit Junior Red Wings. The Junior Red Wings would continue to share Joe Louis Arena with the Detroit Red Wings of the National Hockey League.

The club would use the familiar Red Wings logo and change their colours to red and white to match the NHL team.

== Regular season ==
=== Final standings ===
Note: DIV = Division; GP = Games played; W = Wins; L = Losses; T = Ties; GF = Goals for; GA = Goals against; PTS = Points; x = clinched playoff berth; y = clinched division title

=== Leyden Division ===
Rank	Team	GP	W	L	T	PTS	GF	GA
1	y-Peterborough Petes	66	46	15	5	97	352	239
2	x-Kingston Frontenacs	66	36	19	11	83	314	265
3	x-Oshawa Generals	66	33	28	5	71	270	268
4	x-Sudbury Wolves	66	31	30	5	67	291	300
5	x-Newmarket Royals	66	29	28	9	67	310	301
6	x-Belleville Bulls	66	21	34	11	53	280	315
7	x-North Bay Centennials	66	22	38	6	50	251	299
8	Ottawa 67's	66	16	42	8	40	220	310

=== Emms Division ===
Rank	Team	GP	W	L	T	PTS	GF	GA
1	y-Sault Ste. Marie Greyhounds	66	38	23	5	81	334	260
2	x-Detroit Junior Red Wings	66	37	22	7	81	336	264
3	x-London Knights	66	32	27	7	71	323	292
4	x-Owen Sound Platers	66	29	29	8	66	330	324
5	x-Niagara Falls Thunder	66	29	30	7	65	299	274
6	x-Kitchener Rangers	66	26	31	9	61	280	314
7	x-Guelph Storm	66	27	33	6	60	298	360
8	Windsor Spitfires	66	19	42	5	43	240	343

=== Scoring leaders ===
Player	Team	GP	G	A	Pts	PIM
Andrew Brunette	Owen Sound Platers	66	62	100	162	91
Bob Wren	Detroit Junior Red Wings	63	57	88	145	91
Kevin Brown	Belleville Bulls/Detroit Junior Red Wings	62	50	91	141	80
Pat Peake	Detroit Junior Red Wings	46	58	78	136	64
Mike Harding	Peterborough Petes	66	54	82	136	106
Jason Dawe	Peterborough Petes	59	58	68	126	80
Bill Bowler	Windsor Spitfires	57	44	77	121	41
Jim Brown	Owen Sound Platers	60	53	66	119	66
Jason Allison	London Knights	66	42	76	118	50
Jeff Bes	Guelph Storm	59	48	67	115	128

== Playoffs ==
Division quarterfinals
L1	Peterborough	bye
L4	Sudbury	4
L5	Newmarket	3
L2	Kingston	4
L7	North Bay	1
L3	Oshawa	4
L6	Belleville	3
E1	Sault Ste. Marie	bye
E4	Owen Sound	4
E5	Niagara Falls	0
E2	Detroit	4
E7	Guelph	1
E3	London	4
E6	Kitchener	3

Quarterfinals
L1	Peterborough	4
L4	Sudbury	3
L2	Kingston	4
L3	Oshawa	2
E1	Sault Ste. Marie	4
E4	Owen Sound	0
E2	Detroit	4
E3	London	1

Semifinals
L1	Peterborough	4
L2	Kingston	1
E1	Sault Ste. Marie	4
E2	Detroit	1

Finals
L1	Peterborough	4
E1	Sault Ste. Marie	1

=== OHL Superseries ===
The winner of the OHL Superseries will host the 1993 Memorial Cup. This series featured the top ranked team in the Leyden Division, the Peterborough Petes, take on the top ranked team in the Emms Division, the Sault Ste. Marie Greyhounds.

==== (L1) Peterborough Petes vs. (E1) Sault Ste. Marie Greyhounds ====
March 22	Sault Ste. Marie Greyhounds	5 – 3	Peterborough Petes	Peterborough Memorial Centre

March 23	Sault Ste. Marie Greyhounds	7 – 4	Peterborough Petes	Peterborough Memorial Centre

March 25	Peterborough Petes	1 – 3	Sault Ste. Marie Greyhounds	Sault Memorial Gardens

March 26	Peterborough Petes	2 – 3	OT	Sault Ste. Marie Greyhounds	Sault Memorial Gardens

Sault Ste. Marie wins series 4 – 0

=== Division quarter-finals ===
==== Leyden Division ====
===== (2) Kingston Frontenacs vs. (7) North Bay Centennials =====
March 21	North Bay Centennials	4 – 3	Kingston Frontenacs	Kingston Memorial Centre

March 22	North Bay Centennials	1 – 4	Kingston Frontenacs	Kingston Memorial Centre

March 25	Kingston Frontenacs	4 – 2	North Bay Centennials	North Bay Memorial Gardens

March 26	Kingston Frontenacs	5 – 3	North Bay Centennials	North Bay Memorial Gardens

March 28	North Bay Centennials	4 – 5	Kingston Frontenacs	Kingston Memorial Centre

Kingston wins series 4 – 1

===== (3) Oshawa Generals vs. (6) Belleville Bulls =====
March 21	Belleville Bulls	3 – 4	OT	Oshawa Generals	Oshawa Civic Auditorium

March 23	Oshawa Generals	6 – 5	Belleville Bulls	Yardmen Arena

March 25	Belleville Bulls	5 – 9	Oshawa Generals	Oshawa Civic Auditorium

March 27	Oshawa Generals	2 – 3	Belleville Bulls	Yardmen Arena

March 28	Belleville Bulls	3 – 2	Oshawa Generals	Oshawa Civic Auditorium

March 30	Oshawa Generals	3 – 5	Belleville Bulls	Yardmen Arena

March 31	Belleville Bulls	3 – 4	Oshawa Generals	Oshawa Civic Auditorium

Oshawa wins series 4 – 3

===== (4) Sudbury Wolves vs. (5) Newmarket Royals =====
March 21	Newmarket Royals	5 – 7	Sudbury Wolves	Sudbury Community Arena

March 24	Sudbury Wolves	2 – 7	Newmarket Royals	Newmarket Recreational Complex

March 26	Newmarket Royals	2 – 3	OT	Sudbury Wolves	Sudbury Community Arena

March 28	Sudbury Wolves	4 – 3	Newmarket Royals	Newmarket Recreational Complex

March 29	Newmarket Royals	4 – 2	Sudbury Wolves	Sudbury Community Arena

March 31	Sudbury Wolves	0 – 11	Newmarket Royals	Newmarket Recreational Complex

April 1	Newmarket Royals	1 – 6	Sudbury Wolves	Sudbury Community Arena

Sudbury wins series 4 – 3

==== Emms Division ====
===== (2) Detroit Junior Red Wings vs. (7) Guelph Storm =====
March 21	Guelph Storm	2 – 3	Detroit Jr. Red Wings	Joe Louis Arena

March 23	Detroit Jr. Red Wings	5 – 7	Guelph Storm	Guelph Memorial Gardens

March 25	Guelph Storm	0 – 3	Detroit Jr. Red Wings	Joe Louis Arena

March 26	Detroit Jr. Red Wings	5 – 3	Guelph Storm	Guelph Memorial Gardens

March 28	Guelph Storm	4 – 5	Detroit Jr. Red Wings	Joe Louis Arena

Detroit wins series 4 – 1

===== (3) London Knights vs. (6) Kitchener Rangers =====
March 21	Kitchener Rangers	2 – 7	London Knights	London Gardens

March 23	London Knights	1 – 3	Kitchener Rangers	Kitchener Memorial Auditorium

March 25	Kitchener Rangers	3 – 4	OT	London Knights	London Gardens

March 26	London Knights	3 – 4	Kitchener Rangers	Kitchener Memorial Auditorium

March 28	Kitchener Rangers	10 – 3	London Knights	London Gardens

March 30	London Knights	7 – 6	OT	Kitchener Rangers	Kitchener Memorial Auditorium

March 31	Kitchener Rangers	3 – 6	London Knights	London Gardens

London wins series 4 – 3

===== (4) Owen Sound Platers vs. (5) Niagara Falls Thunder =====
March 21	Niagara Falls Thunder	3 – 6	Owen Sound Platers	Bayshore Community Centre

March 23	Owen Sound Platers	6 – 3	Niagara Falls Thunder	Niagara Falls Memorial Arena

March 26	Niagara Falls Thunder	2 – 3	Owen Sound Platers	Bayshore Community Centre

March 27	Owen Sound Platers	6 – 3	Niagara Falls Thunder	Niagara Falls Memorial Arena

Owen Sound wins series 4 – 0

=== Division semi-finals ===
==== Leyden Division ====
===== (1) Peterborough Petes vs. (4) Sudbury Wolves =====
April 4	Peterborough Petes	1 – 5	Sudbury Wolves	Sudbury Community Arena

April 6	Sudbury Wolves	0 – 9	Peterborough Petes	Peterborough Memorial Centre

April 8	Sudbury Wolves	4 – 9	Peterborough Petes	Peterborough Memorial Centre

April 11	Peterborough Petes	2 – 8	Sudbury Wolves	Sudbury Community Arena

April 13	Sudbury Wolves	1 – 4	Peterborough Petes	Peterborough Memorial Centre

April 14	Peterborough Petes	3 – 5	Sudbury Wolves	Sudbury Community Arena

April 15	Sudbury Wolves	3 – 7	Peterborough Petes	Peterborough Memorial Centre

Peterborough wins series 4 – 3

===== (2) Kingston Frontenacs vs. (3) Oshawa Generals =====
April 2	Oshawa Generals	0 – 7	Kingston Frontenacs	Kingston Memorial Centre

April 4	Kingston Frontenacs	2 – 7	Oshawa Generals	Oshawa Civic Auditorium

April 6	Oshawa Generals	1 – 3	Kingston Frontenacs	Kingston Memorial Centre

April 8	Kingston Frontenacs	6 – 2	Oshawa Generals	Oshawa Civic Auditorium

April 9	Oshawa Generals	5 – 3	Kingston Frontenacs	Kingston Memorial Centre

April 11	Kingston Frontenacs	8 – 5	Oshawa Generals	Oshawa Civic Auditorium

Kingston wins series 4 – 2

==== Emms Division ====
===== (1) Sault Ste. Marie Greyhounds vs. (4) Owen Sound Platers =====
April 3	Owen Sound Platers	2 – 6	Sault Ste. Marie Greyhounds	Sault Memorial Gardens

April 4	Owen Sound Platers	3 – 7	Sault Ste. Marie Greyhounds	Sault Memorial Gardens

April 7	Sault Ste. Marie Greyhounds	10 – 1	Owen Sound Platers	Bayshore Community Centre

April 8	Sault Ste. Marie Greyhounds	6 – 3	Owen Sound Platers	Bayshore Community Centre

Sault Ste. Marie wins series 4 – 0

===== (2) Detroit Junior Red Wings vs. (3) London Knights =====
April 2	London Knights	3 – 5	Detroit Jr. Red Wings	Joe Louis Arena

April 4	Detroit Jr. Red Wings	3 – 2	London Knights	London Gardens

April 6	London Knights	2 – 5	Detroit Jr. Red Wings	Joe Louis Arena

April 9	Detroit Jr. Red Wings	3 – 6	London Knights	London Gardens

April 10	London Knights	1 – 4	Detroit Jr. Red Wings	Joe Louis Arena

Detroit wins series 4 – 1

=== Division finals ===
==== Leyden Division ====
===== (1) Peterborough Petes vs. (2) Kingston Frontenacs =====
April 18	Kingston Frontenacs	6 – 7	Peterborough Petes	Peterborough Memorial Centre

April 20	Peterborough Petes	7 – 5	Kingston Frontenacs	Kingston Memorial Centre

April 22	Kingston Frontenacs	6 – 3	Peterborough Petes	Peterborough Memorial Centre

April 23	Peterborough Petes	5 – 1	Kingston Frontenacs	Kingston Memorial Centre

April 25	Kingston Frontenacs	5 – 11	Peterborough Petes	Peterborough Memorial Centre

Peterborough wins series 4 – 1

==== Emms Division ====
===== (1) Sault Ste. Marie Greyhounds vs. (2) Detroit Junior Red Wings =====
April 16	Detroit Jr. Red Wings	2 – 3	Sault Ste. Marie Greyhounds	Sault Memorial Gardens

April 18	Detroit Jr. Red Wings	1 – 5	Sault Ste. Marie Greyhounds	Sault Memorial Gardens

April 20	Sault Ste. Marie Greyhounds	2 – 5	Detroit Jr. Red Wings	Joe Louis Arena

April 22	Sault Ste. Marie Greyhounds	8 – 2	Detroit Jr. Red Wings	Joe Louis Arena

April 24	Detroit Jr. Red Wings	2 – 3	Sault Ste. Marie Greyhounds	Sault Memorial Gardens

Sault Ste. Marie wins series 4 – 1

=== J. Ross Robertson Cup ===
==== (L1) Peterborough Petes vs. (E1) Sault Ste. Marie Greyhounds ====
April 29	Sault Ste. Marie Greyhounds	3 – 5	Peterborough Petes	Peterborough Memorial Centre

April 30	Sault Ste. Marie Greyhounds	4 – 7	Peterborough Petes	Peterborough Memorial Centre

May 3	Peterborough Petes	3 – 4	Sault Ste. Marie Greyhounds	Sault Memorial Gardens

May 4	Peterborough Petes	5 – 4	Sault Ste. Marie Greyhounds	Sault Memorial Gardens

May 6	Sault Ste. Marie Greyhounds	1 – 4	Peterborough Petes	Peterborough Memorial Centre

Peterborough wins series 4 – 1

== Awards ==
J. Ross Robertson Cup:	Peterborough Petes
Hamilton Spectator Trophy:	Peterborough Petes
Leyden Trophy:	Peterborough Petes
Emms Trophy:	Sault Ste. Marie Greyhounds
Red Tilson Trophy:	Pat Peake, Detroit Junior Red Wings
Eddie Powers Memorial Trophy:	Andrew Brunette, Owen Sound Platers
Matt Leyden Trophy:	Gary Agnew, London Knights
Jim Mahon Memorial Trophy:	Kevin Brown, Detroit Junior Red Wings
Max Kaminsky Trophy:	Chris Pronger, Peterborough Petes
OHL Goaltender of the Year:	Manny Legace, Niagara Falls Thunder
Bill Long Award:	Dr. Robert L. Vaughan, Belleville Bulls
Jack Ferguson Award:	Alyn McCauley, Ottawa 67's
Dave Pinkney Trophy:	Chad Lang and Ryan Douglas, Peterborough Petes
OHL Executive of the Year:	Jim Rutherford, Detroit Junior Red Wings
Emms Family Award:	Jeff O'Neill, Guelph Storm
F.W. 'Dinty' Moore Trophy:	Ken Shepard, Oshawa Generals
OHL Humanitarian of the Year:	Keli Corpse, Kingston Frontenacs
William Hanley Trophy:	Pat Peake, Detroit Junior Red Wings
Leo Lalonde Memorial Trophy:	Scott Hollis, Oshawa Generals
Bobby Smith Trophy:	Tim Spitzig, Kitchener Rangers

== All-star teams ==
The OHL All-star teams were selected by the OHL's general managers.

=== First team ===
- Pat Peake, Centre, Detroit Jr. Red Wings
- Andrew Brunette, Left Wing, Owen Sound Platers
- Jason Dawe, Right Wing, Peterborough Petes
- Chris Pronger, Defence, Peterborough Petes
- Mark DeSantis, Defence, Newmarket Royals
- Manny Legace, Goaltender, Niagara Falls Thunder
- Gary Agnew, Coach, London Knights

=== Second team ===
- Mike Harding, Centre, Peterborough Petes
- Bob Wren, Left Wing, Detroit Jr. Red Wings
- Kevin Brown, Right Wing, Detroit Jr. Red Wings
- Brent Tully, Defence, Peterborough Petes
- Scott Walker, Defence, Owen Sound Platers
- Chad Lang, Goaltender, Peterborough Petes
- Rick Cornacchia, Coach, Oshawa Generals

=== Third team ===
- Chris Gratton, Centre, Kingston Frontenacs
- Jeff Shevalier, Left Wing, North Bay Centennials
- Scott Hollis, Right Wing, Oshawa Generals
- Blair Scott, Defence, Detroit Jr. Red Wings
- Nick Stajduhar, Defence, London Knights
- Marc Lamothe, Goaltender, Kingston Frontenacs
- Dick Todd, Coach, Peterborough Petes

== 1993 OHL Priority Selection ==
The Ottawa 67's held the first overall pick in the 1993 Ontario Priority Selection and selected Alyn McCauley from the Kingston Voyageurs. McCauley was awarded the Jack Ferguson Award, awarded to the top pick in the draft.

Below are the players who were selected in the first round of the 1993 Ontario Hockey League Priority Selection.

#	Player	Nationality	OHL Team	Hometown	Minor Team
1	Alyn McCauley (C)	Canada	Ottawa 67's	Gananoque, Ontario	Kingston Voyageurs
2	Ed Jovanovski (D)	Canada	Windsor Spitfires	Windsor, Ontario	Windsor Royals
3	Scott Cherrey (LW)	Canada	North Bay Centennials	Drayton, Ontario	Listowel Cyclones
4	Travis Riggin (RW)	Canada	Belleville Bulls	Kincardine, Ontario	Milton Merchants
5	Jeff Williams (C)	Canada	Guelph Storm	Newmarket, Ontario	Newmarket 87's
6	Andrew Taylor (C)	Canada	Kitchener Rangers	Stratford, Ontario	Stratford Cullitons
7	Steve Nimigon (LW)	Canada	Niagara Falls Thunder	Oshawa, Ontario	Oshawa Legionaires
8	Shane Kenny (D)	Canada	Owen Sound Platers	Oromocto, New Brunswick	Fredericton Jr. Canadiens
9	Luc Gagne (RW)	Canada	Newmarket Royals	Sturgeon Falls, Ontario	Powassan Hawks
10	Jay McKee (D)	Canada	Sudbury Wolves	Amherstview, Ontario	Ernestown Jets
11	Ryan Appel (RW)	Canada	London Knights	Toronto, Ontario	Toronto Red Wings
12	Ryan Lindsay (C)	Canada	Oshawa Generals	Hamilton, Ontario	St. Mary's Lincolns
13	Robin LaCour (D)	Canada	Detroit Junior Red Wings	Hagersville, Ontario	Ohsweken Golden Eagles
14	Steve Zoryk (LW)	Canada	Sault Ste. Marie Greyhounds	Ottawa, Ontario	Cumberland Grads
15	Chad Kilger (C)	Canada	Kingston Frontenacs	Cornwall, Ontario	Cornwall Colts
16	Jonathan Murphy (D)	Canada	Peterborough Petes	Charlottetown, PEI	Charlottetown Abbies

== See also ==
- List of OHA Junior A standings
- List of OHL seasons
- 1993 Memorial Cup
- 1993 NHL entry draft
- 1992 in sports
- 1993 in sports

Preceded by 1991–92 OHL season	OHL seasons	Succeeded by 1993–94 OHL season
