= 1989 Centennial Cup =

1989 Manitoba Centennial Cup

Tournament details
- Venue: Summerside, Prince Edward Island
- Dates: May 1989
- Teams: 4

Final positions
- Champions: Thunder Bay Flyers (1st title)
- Runners-up: Summerside Western Capitals
- Third place: Moncton Hawks
- Fourth place: Vernon Lakers

Tournament statistics
- Games played: 8
- Scoring leader: Greg Johnson (Thunder Bay)

Awards
- MVP: Todd Hendersen (Thunder Bay)

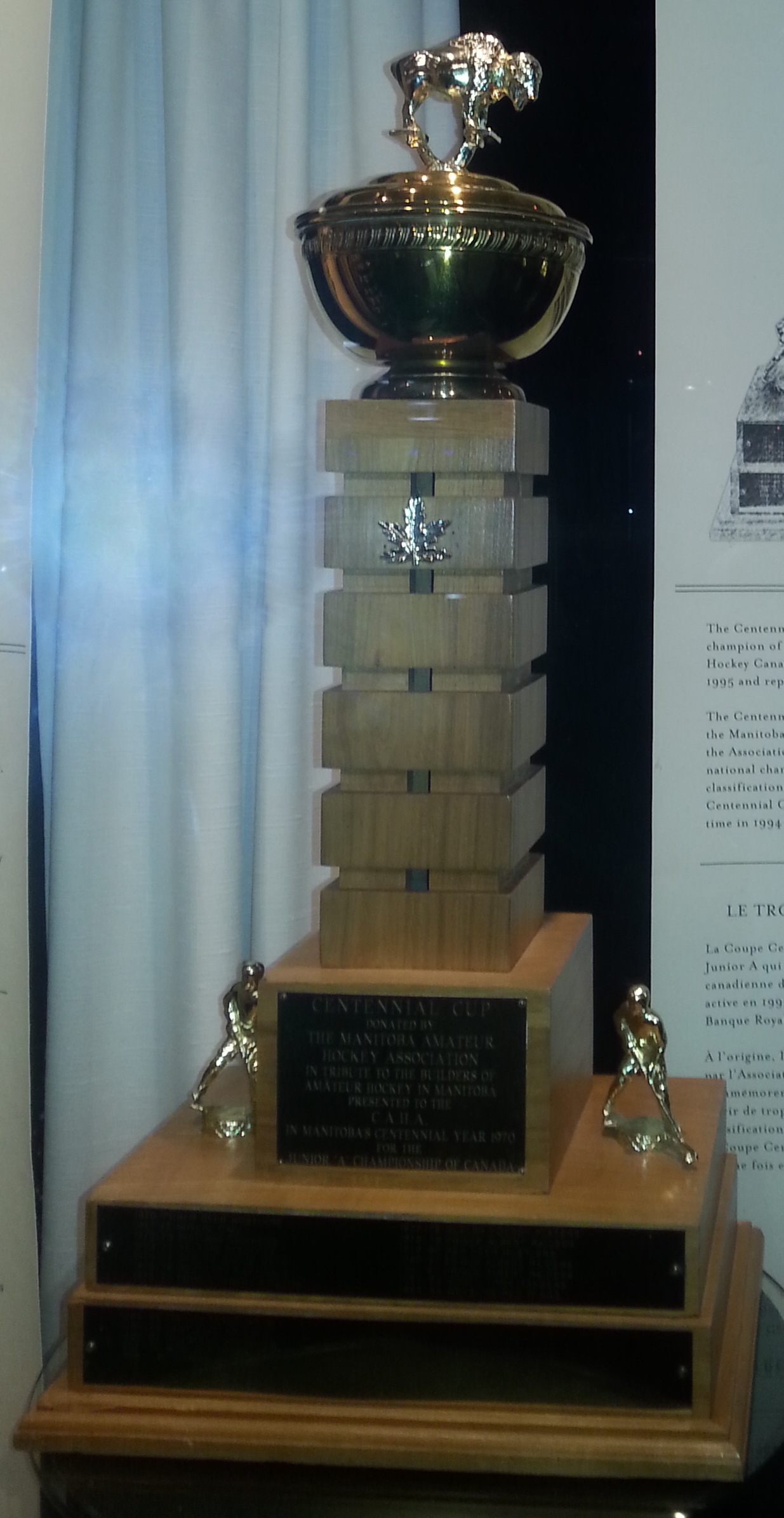
The Centennial Cup

The 1989 Centennial Cup is the 19th Junior "A" 1989 ice hockey National Championship for the Canadian Junior A Hockey League.

The Centennial Cup was competed for by the winners of the Abbott Cup, Dudley Hewitt Cup, the Callaghan Cup, and a host city.

The tournament was hosted by the Summerside Western Capitals in the city of Summerside, Prince Edward Island.

== The Playoffs ==
The Thunder Bay Flyers were coached by Dave Siciliano, and won the United States Hockey League regular season and playoffs in 1989. The Flyers began the Canadian playoffs undefeated in eight games with series victories versus the Sudbury Cubs and the Pembroke Lumber Kings to win the Dudley Hewitt Cup. Siciliano recalled that the Flyers were not given respect in advance of the 1989 Centennial Cup, and said that "the host Summerside team commented at the coaches press conference that Thunder Bay couldn't be very strong since they played in an American-based league". During the round-robin stage of the tournament, the Flyers earned wins versus the Vernon Lakers and Moncton Hawks, and lost to the Summerside Western Capitals. The Flyers earned a berth in the cup finals based on goal difference among three teams tied for first place, then defeated Summerside by a 4–1 score in the final game to win the Centennial Cup. The Centennial Cup championship was the first for any team from Northwestern Ontario.

=== Round Robin ===
Pos	League (Ticket)	Team	Pld	W	L	GF	GA	GD	Qualification
1	USHL (Dudley Hewitt Cup)	Thunder Bay Flyers	3	2	1	18	9	+9	Final
2	MVJHL (Callaghan Cup)	Moncton Hawks	3	2	1	13	11	+2	Semi-final
3	IJHL (Host)	Summerside Western Capitals	3	2	1	13	14	−1	Semi-final
4	BCJHL (Abbott Cup)	Vernon Lakers	3	0	3	8	18	−10	

==== Results ====
Thunder Bay Flyers defeated Vernon Lakers 8-2
Summerside Western Capitals defeated Thunder Bay Flyers 5-4
Moncton Hawks defeated Vernon Lakers 5-2
Moncton Hawks defeated Summerside Western Capitals 6-3
Thunder Bay Flyers defeated Moncton Hawks 6-2
Summerside Western Capitals defeated Vernon Lakers 5-4 double overtime

=== Semi-finals and Final ===
Semi-finals			Centennial Cup Finals
			1	Thunder Bay Flyers	4
2	Moncton Hawks	2	3	Summerside Western Capitals	1
3	Summerside Western Capitals	3

Please note: Semi- Final was won in 14:51 of 3rd overtime period

== Awards ==
Most Valuable Player: Todd Hendersen (Thunder Bay Flyers)
Top Scorer: Greg Johnson (Thunder Bay Flyers)
Most Sportsmanlike Player: Cam Sylven (Vernon Lakers)

=== All-Star Team ===
Forward

Greg Johnson (Thunder Bay Flyers)
Ken Murchison (Summerside Western Capitals)
Jason Bortolussi(Thunder Bay Flyers)

Defence

Rodney Gallant (Summerside Western Capitals)
Stephane Duval (Moncton Hawks)

Goal

Darin Baker (Moncton Hawks)

== Roll of League Champions ==
AJHL: Red Deer Rustlers
BCJHL: Vernon Lakers
CJHL: Pembroke Lumber Kings
IJHL: Summerside Western Capitals
MJHL: Winnipeg South Blues
MVJHL: Moncton Hawks
NOJHL: Sudbury Cubs
PCJHL: Williams Lake Mustangs
QPJHL: Longueuil Collège Français
SJHL: Humboldt Broncos

== See also ==
- Canadian Junior A Hockey League
- Royal Bank Cup
- Anavet Cup
- Doyle Cup
- Dudley Hewitt Cup
- Fred Page Cup
- Abbott Cup
- Mowat Cup
