= Dave Siciliano =

Canadian ice hockey coach and player (born 1946)

- Born: July 7, 1946 (age 80); Fort William, Ontario, Canada
- Education: Lakehead University; Northern Michigan University
- Occupation: Ice hockey coach
- Awards: Northwestern Ontario Sports Hall of Fame (1995)

David John Siciliano (born July 7, 1946) is a Canadian former ice hockey coach and player. He played university hockey for the Lakehead Nor'Westers, and led them to the International Collegiate Hockey Association championship as the most valuable player in the 1966–67 season. As the player-coach for the Thunder Bay Twins, his team won both the United States Hockey League (USHL) playoffs and the 1975 Allan Cup as the Canadian senior champions. He served as head coach of the Thunder Bay Flyers from 1986 to 1993, where he won four regular season titles, and two playoffs championships, and two Centennial Cups as Canadian junior champions. He was a coach for the Canada men's under-18 team at the Phoenix Cup in 1987 and 1991, and for the Canada men's junior team which won gold at the 1993 World Juniors.

Siciliano was the first coach of the Edmonton Ice when the team was established for the 1996–97 Western Hockey League season, then was coach and general manager of the Owen Sound Platers in the Ontario Hockey League from 1997 to 2000. He returned to the USHL as coach and general manager of the Sioux City Musketeers from 2000 to 2008. He led them to a playoffs championship in 2002, and had the second most career victories for a coach in the USHL when he retired. He was named Coach of the Year in three USHL seasons, and received the league's Distinguished Service Award in 2009. The Canadian Amateur Hockey Association named him the recipient of the Gordon Juckes Award in 1987, for contributions to amateur hockey in Canada. He was twice inducted into the Wall of Fame at Lakehead University, and was inducted into the builder category of the Northwestern Ontario Sports Hall of Fame in 1995.

== Early life and playing career ==
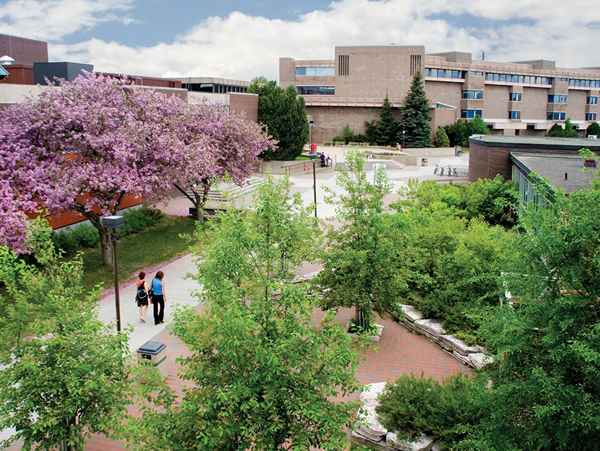
Lakehead University

David John Siciliano was born on July 7, 1946, in Fort William, Ontario, into a family of Italian Canadians. He began playing minor ice hockey at age 13, then attended Westgate Collegiate & Vocational Institute where he played ice hockey, baseball and Canadian football. During high school, he won the 1963 juvenile championship as a pitcher in the Lakehead Baseball Association, and was a right-handed centreman playing junior ice hockey with the Fort William Canadiens. He graduated high school in 1966.

In university, Siciliano played three seasons for the Lakehead Nor'Westers from 1966 to 1969. He served as an assistant team captain in his first two seasons, and as the captain in his third season. He was coached by Hank Akervall and played on the same forward line with Dwight Stirrett and Murray Smith each season, which became known as the "S-line". The 1966–67 Lakehead team won the International Collegiate Hockey Association (ICHA) championship, and Siciliano led the association in points scored.

In three seasons playing for Lakehead, Siciliano was named to the ICHA All-Conference team in each season, was named to the first National Association of Intercollegiate Athletics All-American yeam in the 1968–69 season, and scored 54 goals and 102 assists. He also played for Lakehead in an exhibition game versus the Romania men's national team in 1967, and was invited by coach Jackie McLeod to tryout for the Canada men's national team in September 1968.

During summers while attending university, Siciliano played for the Gateway Builders in the Lakehead Baseball Association senior league. He won the 1969 league championship, as a pitcher, outfielder, and assistant coach.

Siciliano was an English major at Lakehead University, and graduated with a Bachelor of Arts degree in 1969. He then played senior ice hockey for the Fort William Beavers during the 1969–70 season. He later completed his Master of Physical Education degree from Northern Michigan University, while playing the 1970–71 season with the Marquette Iron Rangers as a graduate student. His master thesis was, "The Relationship of Battery of Hockey Skills Test to Hockey Playing Ability". Siciliano stated that the tests were best suited to determining the skill level and eventual skill level of younger players.

== Coaching career ==
=== 1971 to 1980 ===
Siciliano was a player-coach for HIFK Hockey in Finland in during the 1971–72 SM-sarja season. He led the team to a third-place finish with 18 wins in 32 games, winning the league's bronze medal. He returned to Canada for the 1972–73 season, and played for the Thunder Bay Twins coached by Lee Fogolin Sr. The Twins placed first overall during the United States Hockey League (USHL) regular season.

In addition to playing the 1972–73 season, Siciliano also coached the Thunder Bay Hurricanes in the Can-Am Junior Hockey League. In the 1973–74 season, he coached the Hurricanes in the Midwest Junior Hockey League. His team completed the 1973–74 regular season in first place with 45 wins in 60 games. In the 1974 Centennial Cup playoffs, the Hurricanes defeated the Wexford Raiders four games to three in the first round, then were defeated four games to three by the Smiths Falls Bears in the second round.

The Allan Cup

In the 1974–75 season, Siciliano served as a player-coach for the Thunder Bay Twins in the USHL. He led the team to 36 wins in 48 games, and a second-place finish in the Northern Division. He felt that goaltending would make a difference in the playoffs, and that his team played best against the stronger teams in the USHL. The Twins defeated the first-place Green Bay Bobcats two games to none in a best-of-three series in the first round of the playoffs. Siciliano credited his team's defensive and positional play for winning the series. The Twins won the final round of the playoffs with three consecutive wins versus Waterloo Black Hawks in a best-of-five series for the USHL championship.

The Twins chose not to participate in the 1975 Allan Cup playoffs for the Canadian senior hockey championship due to scheduling conflicts with the USHL playoffs. After the St. Boniface Mohawks appealed for reconsideration, the Twins entered the Allan Cup playoffs upon the conclusion of the USHL playoffs, then won the series versus the Mohawks. In the Western Canada finals, the Twins won the best-of-five series with three consecutive victories versus the Spokane Flyers. The Twins scored five goals in the last 25 minutes of the decisive third game, including the winning goal scored with six seconds remaining. In a best-of-seven series for the national championship, Siciliano and the Twins won the Allan Cup by defeating the defending champion Barrie Flyers four games to two. The Twins then withdrew from the USHL due to travel costs and schedule commitments to represent Canada on a European tour in the 1975–76 season.

Siciliano's USHL player rights were drafted by the Traverse City Bays, but he chose to retire from playing to coach full-time. After he completed his level five certification from the National Hockey Coaches School in 1975; he then conducted coaching clinics on behalf of the Canadian Amateur Hockey Association (CAHA), and operated power skating and hockey schools in Thunder Bay.

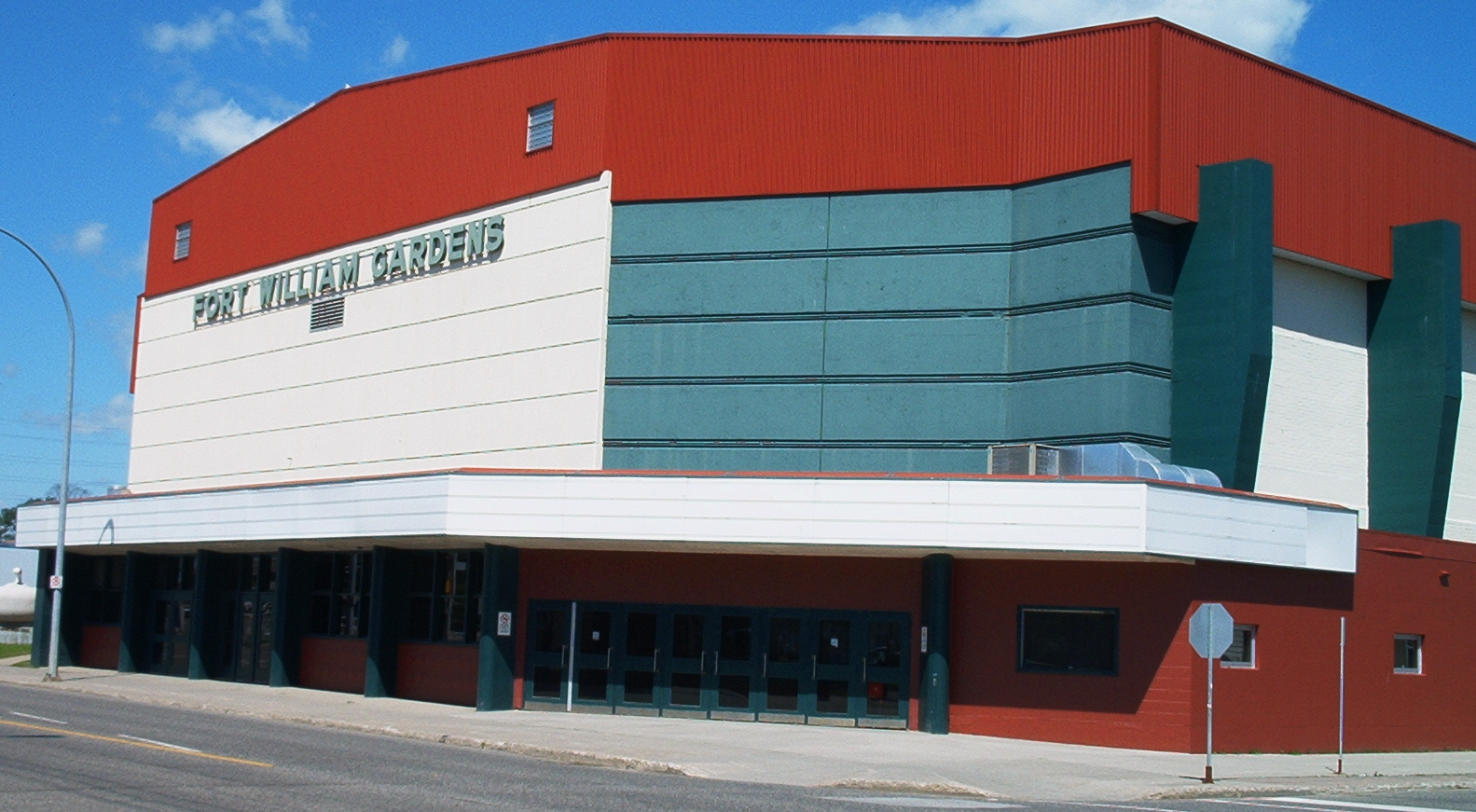
The Fort William Gardens was the home arena to multiple hockey teams in Thunder Bay.

From 1975 to 1980, Siciliano was the athletic director at Lakehead University, an assistant professor of physical education, and head coach of the Lakehead Nor'Westers which played in the Great Plains Athletic Conference (GPAC) as part of Canadian university men's hockey. He coached the Nor'Westers to the GPAC championship finals during the 1977–78 season, but lost the best-of-three series versus the Regina Cougars by two games to one.

Siciliano represented Lakehead University at the Canadian Interuniversity Athletics Union meeting in June 1979, which voted against financial aid or scholarships to student athletes. He felt that the decision would lead to under-the-table offers to students in lieu of legitimate financial support. He chose to leave Lakehead University in 1980 wanting a new challenge, stating that an elite sports program was not a priority of the school.

=== Thunder Bay Kings/Flyers ===
Siciliano was hired to coach the Thunder Bay Kings for the 1981–82 season, in the Thunder Bay Hockey League. The Kings won the TBHL playoffs, but lost in the semifinals of the Dudley Hewitt Cup for the Ontario championship.

Siciliano served as head coach of the Thunder Bay Flyers in the USHL from 1986 to 1993. He led the team to 35 wins and a second-place finish during the 1986–87 season. After defeating the Sioux City Musketeers in the first round of the playoffs, the Flyers lost three games to two versus the Madison Capitols in the second round.

The Flyers won 40 games and placed first overall in the 1987–88 season, which gave Siciliano his first Anderson Cup as the USHL's regular season champion. Despite that his team had 13 rookies, the Flyers had the highest scoring offence in the league and the second best goals against average. The Ottawa Citizen credited the team's success to its skating ability, puck control and aggressive forechecking. The Flyers defeated the Madison Capitols by three games to one in the first round of the playoffs, then defeated the Rochester Mustangs by three games to one in the finals to win the Clark Cup as USHL playoffs champions. The Flyers then participated in the Dudley Hewitt Cup playoffs to determine the Central Canada "Junior A" champion, and lost to the Pembroke Lumber Kings in four consecutive games in the final series. Since the Lumber Kings hosted the 1988 Centennial Cup tournament to determine the Canadian Junior A champion and received an automatic berth, the Flyers advanced to the Centennial Cup tournament as the Dudley Hewitt Cup finalists. The tournament was the first appearance for the Flyers at the Centennial Cup, which saw them lose all three games played and finish in fourth place.

The Dudley Hewitt Cup

Siciliano led the Flyers to 40 wins and placed first overall in the 1988–89 season, to win his second Anderson Cup. In the USHL playoffs, the Flyers defeated the Omaha Lancers in three games in the first round, then defeated the North Iowa Huskies in four games in the second round, then defeated the St. Paul Vulcans in five games to give Siciliano his second Clark Cup championship. The Flyers began the Canadian playoffs undefeated in eight games with series victories versus the Sudbury Cubs and the Pembroke Lumber Kings to give Siciliano his first Dudley Hewitt Cup. Siciliano recalled that the Flyers were not given respect in advance of the 1989 Centennial Cup, and said that "the host Summerside team commented at the coaches press conference that Thunder Bay couldn't be very strong since they played in an American-based league". During the round-robin stage of the tournament, the Flyers earned wins versus the Vernon Lakers and Moncton Hawks, and lost to the Summerside Western Capitals. The Flyers earned a berth in the cup finals based on goal difference among three teams tied for first place, then defeated Summerside by a 4–1 score in the final game to win the Centennial Cup. Siciliano summarized the game by saying, "our team speed and skill over powered Summerside and we were unfazed by the full house and their physical play"; and "believe[d] that team was one of the best junior teams to ever represent Thunder Bay". The Centennial Cup championship was the first for both Siciliano and for any team from Northwestern Ontario.

The Flyers won 31 games and placed third overall in the 1989–90 season. They defeated the St. Paul Vulcans in three games in the first round of the playoffs then were defeated three games to two by the Rochester Mustangs in the semifinals. In the Dudley Hewitt Cup playoffs, the Flyers lost 4 games to 2 versus the Sudbury Cubs in the semifinals.

During the summer in 1990, Siciliano spent several weeks in Bressanone with the Italy men's national team, organizing practices and inter-squad games. He declined an offer to coach the team full-time for the next two seasons, opting to return to Thunder Bay.

Siciliano won his third Anderson Cup when the Flyers placed first overall in the 1990–91 season with 36 wins. In the playoffs, the Flyers defeated the North Iowa Huskies in three games in the quarterfinals, defeated the Dubuque Fighting Saints in three games in the semifinals, then lost by three games to one versus the Omaha Lancers in the Clark Cup finals. The Flyers reached the finals of the Dudley Hewitt Cup playoffs versus the Sudbury Cubs, which guaranteed them a berth in the 1991 Centennial Cup tournament since Sudbury was scheduled to host the upcoming national finals. Despite missing four players including their goaltender due to suspensions, the Flyers defeated Sudbury by a 5–1 score to give Siciliano his second Dudley Hewitt Cup championship. In his third appearance at the Centennial Cup tournament, the Flyers placed fifth with one win in four games.

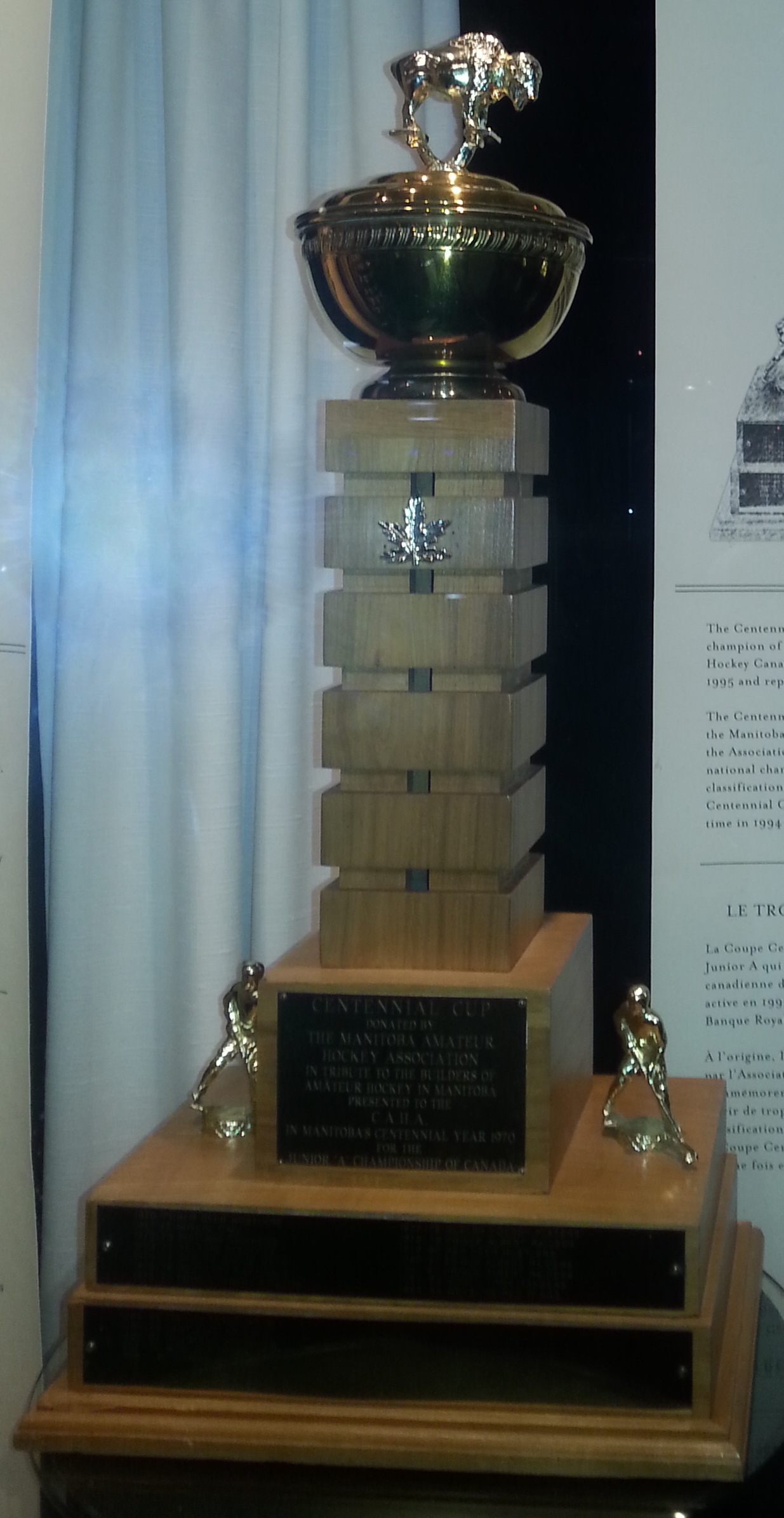
The Centennial Cup

The Flyers won 36 games and placed first overall in the 1991–92 season to give Siciliano his fourth Anderson Cup. In the playoffs, the Flyers defeated the Rochester Mustangs in three consecutive games, then lost by three games to one versus the Dubuque Fighting Saints in the semifinals. The Flyers hosted the 1992 Dudley Hewitt Cup tournament in Thunder Bay. They placed second during the round-robin, defeated the Joliette Nationals by a 5–2 score in the semifinals, then defeated the Kanata Valley Lasers by a 5–1 score in the finals, which gave Siciliano his third Dudley Hewitt Cup. At the 1992 Centennial Cup, the Flyers completed the round-robin with two wins and two losses, then defeated the Halifax Mooseheads by an 8–1 score to reach the finals versus the Winkler Flyers. Siciliano recalled in a 2021 interview that, Winkler was "a bigger and more physical team and wanted to wear their black sweaters" as an intimidation tactic. As the home team with the first choice of colours, Siciliano's Flyers wore dark red jerseys and forced Winkler to change into light-coloured jerseys. Siciliano felt that worked in his team's favour as Winkler took penalties early in the game, and his team won by a 10-1 score giving Siciliano a second Centennial Cup championship.

The Flyers placed fourth overall in the 1992–93 season, defeated the St. Paul Vulcans by three games to two in the first round of the playoffs, then were defeated three games to one by the Omaha Lancers in the second round. In the Dudley Hewitt Cup playoffs, the Flyers reached the semifinals but lost to the Chateauguay Elites. Siciliano resigned as coach of the Flyers after the 1992–93 season, but remained as the team's general manager for the next two seasons.

The Flyers placed sixth overall in the 1993–94 season, lost in the first round of the USHL playoffs in six games to the Omaha Lancers, and were runners-up to the Chateauguay Elites in the Dudley Hewitt Cup finals. The Flyers placed fifth overall in the 1994–95 season, and lost in six games to the Sioux City Musketeers in the first round of the playoffs. After Siciliano won his fourth Dudley Hewitt Cup when the Flyers defeated the Brampton Capitals in the championship game, his team lost to the Calgary Canucks in the 1995 Centennial Cup semifinals.

=== Canadian national teams ===
Siciliano served as chairman of the high-performance committee of the CAHA development council from 1983 to 1996, and assisted writing coaching manuals for the CAHA. He was the general manager of an Ontario all-star team in the midget age group which played against a touring Soviet Union team, in a program overseen by the CAHA to identify prospect players for the Canada men's national team in ice hockey at the 1988 Winter Olympics. He served as assistant coach of the Canada men's national under-18 team at the Phoenix Cup in 1987, then was head coach of Canada's under-18 team which won the silver medal at the 1991 Phoenix Cup in Japan. He was an assistant coach to Perry Pearn with the Canada men's national junior team which won gold at the 1993 World Junior Ice Hockey Championships in Sweden.

=== Edmonton Ice ===
On January 16, 1996, Siciliano was announced as the first head coach for the Edmonton Ice, an expansion team in the Western Hockey League. He signed a two-year contract, and had previously declined offers from the Red Deer Rebels, and the Michigan Tech Huskies team. Siciliano and team owner Ed Chynoweth, were committed to building a relationship between the Edmonton Ice and the local minor hockey program.

The Edmonton Ice completed the 1996–97 season with 14 wins in 72 games, placed last overall in the league, and did not qualify for the playoffs. When the team began the 1997–98 season with nine losses and one tie, Siciliano was fired on October 24, 1997, and replaced by assistant coach Ryan McGill. During Siciliano's tenure, the Edmonton Ice lost 31 games by a one-goal margin.

=== Owen Sound Platers ===
On November 25, 1997, Siciliano was named the coach and general manager of the Owen Sound Platers in the Ontario Hockey League. He declined two coaching offers from the Western Professional Hockey League, and opted to take charge of the Platers who had a record of 9–12–1 with coach John Lovell. The Platers completed the 1997–98 season with 27 wins in 66 games, and placed fourth in the Central Division. In the playoffs, the Platers won the first round four games to two versus the Kitchener Rangers, then lost in the second round four games to one versus the Ottawa 67's.

Siciliano led the Platers to 39 wins in 68 games during the 1998–99 season, and a third-place finish in the Western Conference. In the playoffs, the Platers won the first round four games to one versus the Sault Ste. Marie Greyhounds, won the second round four games to two versus the Guelph Storm, then lost in the third round four games to one versus the London Knights. The 1998–99 season marked the first time which the Platers advanced to the third round of the playoffs during the franchise's history in Owen Sound.

The Platers began the 1999–2000 season with a record of 11–26–3–4, and were last place in the Midwest Division. Siciliano was fired on January 15, 2000, and replaced by his assistant coach Brian O'Leary. In a 2004 interview, Siciliano stated that he was fired because management of the Platers felt that the team was not winning enough games.

=== Sioux City Musketeers ===
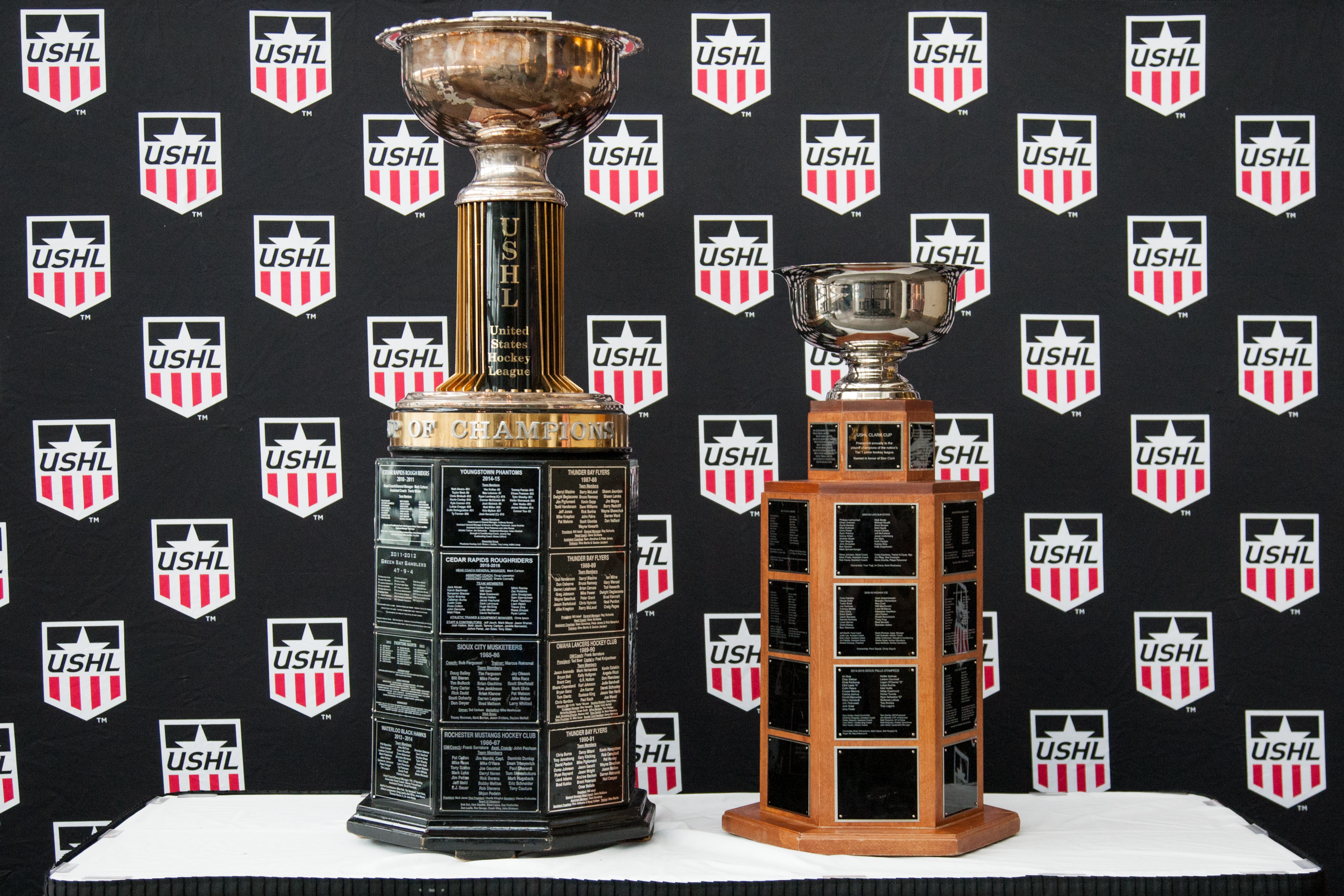
The Anderson Cup (left) and Clark Cup (right) are the USHL trophies for the respective regular season and playoffs champions.

The Sioux City Musketeers of the USHL named Siciliano as head coach and general manager to succeed Dave Hakstol on June 26, 2000. Sioux City radio station KOOL 99.5 broadcast The Dave Siciliano Show on Mondays during the season, which included interviews with the coach and the team's players. He promised that his team would be in better physical condition and to outwork their opponents. The Musketeers placed fifth in the West Division during the 2000–01 season, and lost in the first round of the playoffs in three consecutive games to the Lincoln Stars.

Siciliano led the Musketeers to 41 wins and a third-place finish in the West Division during the 2001–02 season, which included a 16-game winning streak, and 33 wins in 37 games played on home ice. In the playoffs, the Musketeers defeated the Sioux Falls Stampede in three consecutive games in the first round, defeated the Green Bay Gamblers in four games in the second round, then defeated the Omaha Lancers three games to two in the playoffs finals. The victory gave Siciliano his third Clark Cup coaching the playoffs champions of the USHL. At the start of the season, Siciliano had not expected to reach the finals nor win the cup, but credited the team for being tight-knit and "just great quality kids" who handled adversity. During the fifth game of the finals, the Musketeers trailed by a 3–1 score in the third period, then tied up the game in the final six minutes and won in overtime. In a 2008 interview, Siciliano recalled that the Clark Cup victory in 2002 was his fondest memory with the team.

The Musketeers placed third in the West Division with 36 wins during the 2002–03 season, and lost to the River City Lancers three games to one in the first round of the playoffs. Siciliano improved the Musketeers to 38 wins and a second-place finish in the West Division in the 2003–04 season. They defeated the River City Lancers in three games in the first round of the playoffs, then where defeated by the Tri-City Storm in four games in the second round.

Siciliano led the Musketeers to 37 wins and a second-place finish in the West Division during the 2004–05 season. In the playoffs, the Musketeers won the first round by three games to one versus the Lincoln Stars, and won the second round by three games to one versus the Tri-City Storm. Each of Siciliano's three Clark Cups as of 2005 had been won by a victory in the opposing team's rink, and he attempted to win a fourth on the road in Cedar Rapids, Iowa. The Cedar Rapids RoughRiders won the Clark Cup in the fifth and deciding game by a 4–1 score. Siciliano credited his team for not quitting despite the strong play of opposing goaltender Alex Stalock.

The Musketeers placed fifth in the West Division with 28 wins in the 2005–06 season, and did not qualify for the playoffs. Siciliano improved the Musketeers to 34 wins despite placing fifth again in the West Division in the 2006–07 season. In the playoffs, the Musketeers were defeated four games to three by the Tri-City Storm in the first round.

Siciliano withdrew his name from consideration to coach the men's hockey team at Lakehead University, and returned to the Musketeers for the 2007–08 season. He led the team to 32 wins and a fourth-place finish in the West Division, then lost to the Omaha Lancers three games to one in the first round of the playoffs. On April 1, 2008, Siciliano resigned from the Musketeers after eight years as coach and general manager. He had the second most career victories for a coach in the USHL at the time, and had the most wins for a Musketeers coach with 272 victories.

While in Sioux City, Siciliano was nicknamed "The Professor". The Sioux City Journal credited Siciliano for having "etched a distinct signature on Musketeer ice success for eight seasons". He reflected on his time with the Musketeers by saying, "coaching in Sioux City has been a wonderful experience, one of my best in hockey". He was also proud of designing the team's circular dressing room at the Gateway Arena, where players could "look [their] teammates directly in the eye".

=== Coaching statistics ===
Career coaching statistics:

- NOTE: Thunder Bay teams in the USHL participated in both the league's playoffs and the Canadian championship playoffs.

Season	Team	League	Games	Won	Lost	Tied	OTL	Points	Pct	Standing	Playoffs / notes
1971–72	HIFK Hockey	SM-sarja	32	18	9	5	–	41	0.641	3rd, League	Bronze medal
1972–73	Thunder Bay Hurricanes	CAJHL	31	5	21	5	–	15	0.242	4th, League	Lost in round 1
1973–74	Thunder Bay Hurricanes	MJHL	60	45	14	1	–	91	0.758	1st, League	Lost in Dudley Hewitt Cup finals
1974–75	Thunder Bay Twins	USHL	48	36	10	2	–	74	0.771	2nd, Northern	Won USHL playoffs Won 1975 Allan Cup
1975 to 1980 Lakehead Nor'Westers results incomplete
1981–82	Thunder Bay Kings	TBHL	23	9	14	0	–	18	0.391	3rd, League	Won TBHL playoffs Lost in Centennial Cup semifinals
1986–87	Thunder Bay Flyers	USHL	48	35	10	1	2	73	0.760	2nd, League	Lost in USHL round 2 Did not qualify for Dudley Hewitt Cup
1987–88	Thunder Bay Flyers	USHL	48	40	7	1	0	81	0.844	1st, League	Won Clark Cup; Lost in Dudley Hewitt Cup finals 4th, 1988 Centennial Cup
1988–89	Thunder Bay Flyers	USHL	48	40	6	2	0	82	0.854	1st, League	Won Clark Cup; Won Dudley Hewitt Cup; Won 1989 Centennial Cup
1989–90	Thunder Bay Flyers	USHL	48	31	16	1	0	63	0.656	3rd, League	Lost in USHL round 2 Lost in Dudley Hewitt Cup semifinals
1990–91	Thunder Bay Flyers	USHL	48	36	10	2	0	77	0.771	1st, League	Lost in Clark Cup finals Won Dudley Hewitt Cup; 5th, 1991 Centennial Cup
1991–92	Thunder Bay Flyers	USHL	48	36	11	1	0	74	0.760	1st, League	Lost in USHL round 2 Won Dudley Hewitt Cup; Won 1992 Centennial Cup
1992–93	Thunder Bay Flyers	USHL	48	31	14	2	1	65	0.677	4th, League	Lost in USHL round 2 Lost in Dudley Hewitt Cup semifinals
1996–97	Edmonton Ice	WHL	72	14	56	2	–	30	0.208	5th, Central	Did not qualify
1997–98	Edmonton Ice	WHL	10	0	9	1	–	1	0.050	5th, Central	Fired on October 24, 1997
1997–98	Owen Sound Platers	OHL	46	20	22	4	–	44	0.478	4th, Central	Lost in round 2
1998–99	Owen Sound Platers	OHL	68	39	22	5	–	83	0.625	3rd, Western	Lost in round 3
1999–2000	Owen Sound Platers	OHL	44	11	26	3	4	29	0.330	10th, Western	Fired on January 15, 2000
2000–01	Sioux City Musketeers	USHL	56	27	22	–	7	61	0.545	6th, West	Lost in round 1
2001–02	Sioux City Musketeers	USHL	61	41	16	–	4	86	0.705	3rd, West	Won Clark Cup
2002–03	Sioux City Musketeers	USHL	60	36	18	–	6	78	0.650	3rd, West	Lost in round 1
2003–04	Sioux City Musketeers	USHL	60	38	15	–	7	83	0.692	2nd, West	Lost in round 2
2004–05	Sioux City Musketeers	USHL	60	37	17	–	6	80	0.667	2nd, West	Lost in Clark Cup finals
2005–06	Sioux City Musketeers	USHL	60	28	26	–	6	62	0.517	5th, West	Did not qualify
2006–07	Sioux City Musketeers	USHL	60	34	21	–	5	73	0.608	5th, West	Lost in round 1
2007–08	Sioux City Musketeers	USHL	60	32	25	–	3	67	0.558	4th, West	Lost in round 1
TOTALS		USHL	861	558	244	12	47	1179	0.685	5 first-place finishes 3 Dudley Hewitt Cups 3 Clark Cups 2 Centennial Cups 1 Allan Cup	
TOTALS		OHL	158	70	70	12	4	156	0.494	–	
TOTALS		WHL	82	14	65	3	0	31	0.189	–	

== Later hockey career ==
After retiring from coaching in 2008, Siciliano worked for the hockey operations department of the USHL. In September 2016, he was named a senior advisor to the Superior International Junior Hockey League. He mentored the leagues coaches, assisted with the scouting and development of players, and disciplinary reviews.

== Honours and awards ==
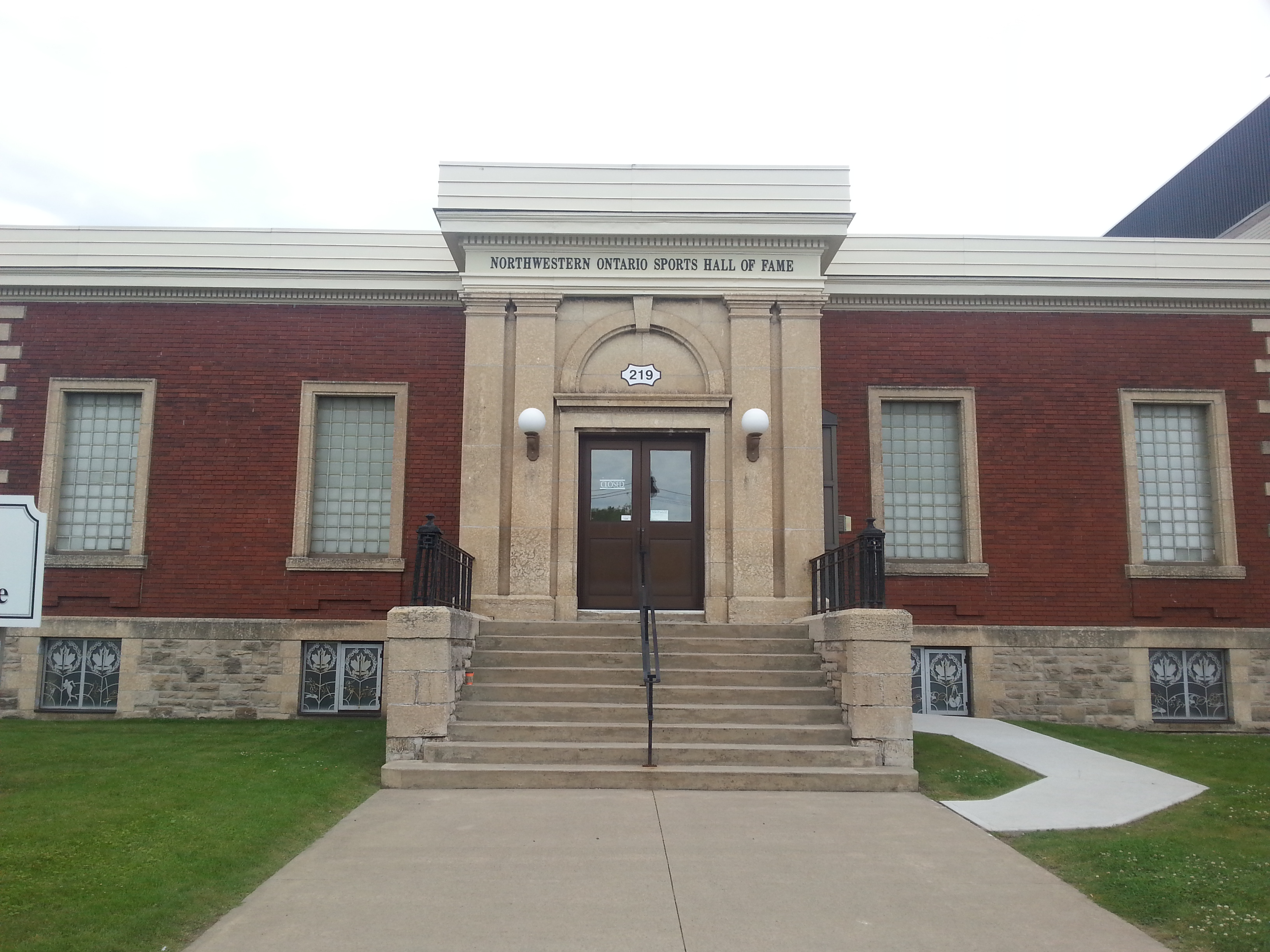
The Northwestern Ontario Sports Hall of Fame

Playing for the Lakehead Nor'Westers, Siciliano was named an ICHA all-star in all three seasons, twice was named a National Association of Intercollegiate Athletics All-American, and was named the ICHA most valuable player for the 1966–67 season.

The CAHA named Siciliano the recipient of the Gordon Juckes Award in 1987, in recognition of contributions to development of amateur hockey at the national level in Canada. He was named the USHL Coach of the Year in the 1986–87, 1988–89 and 1990–91 seasons; and was named a third team all-star coach for the 1998–99 Ontario Hockey League season.

Siciliano was inducted into the builder category of the Northwestern Ontario Sports Hall of Fame in 1995. He was inducted into the Lakehead Thunderwolves Wall of Fame in 1999 as a member of the 1966–67 men's hockey team, and inducted again in 2007 as a member of the "S-line" with Dwight Stirrett and Murray Smith. The USHL recognized Siciliano's career with the Distinguished Service Award in 2009.

== Personal life ==
Siciliano married Carol in 1970, and raised a son and a daughter. His wife was head of Thunder Bay's adult education program until 1996, then oversaw the player housing program for the Musketeers, and the school reading program involving players from the Musketeers. Their son Mark played as a defenceman on the 1992 Centennial Cup championship team.

As a volunteer, Siciliano has coached several minor hockey teams in Thunder Bay. In the 1980–81 season, he coached the Thunder Bay Andrews bantam-A team who were the regional Silver Stick Tournament champions, and won a bronze medal at the Ontario championships. From the 1982–83 season to the 1985–86 season, he coached minor hockey with the Thunder Bay Comets, winning a silver medal at the Ontario bantam championships in 1984. He later coached the Thunder Bay Kings AAA bantam team to the Ontario championship during the 1995–96 season, and coached the AAA midget team from 2008 to 2010.

In the community, Siciliano worked as a recreation leadership instructor at Confederation College from 1972 to 1975. He developed recreational programs for handicapped and geriatric patients at Lakehead Psychiatric Hospital. He received the Outstanding Young Person Award in 1981, from the Thunder Bay South Junior Chamber International.

As the manager of the Canada Games Complex in Thunder Bay from 1980 to 1993, Siciliano oversaw preparations for hosting the 1981 Canada Games at the complex. He served as chairman of the Thunder Bay Community Fitness Council from 1981 to 1990, and as chairman of Olympic Torch Relay committee for Thunder Bay in advance of the 1988 Winter Olympics hosted in Calgary. He was later the general manager of the Thunder Bay Community Services Department from 1993 to 1996.

Siciliano has held several positions on the board of directors for the Northwestern Ontario Sports Hall of Fame, and was president of 2016, He also served a five-year term as chairman of the board of directors for the Thunder Bay International Airport Authority, ending in 2022.
