= 1992 Centennial Cup =

1992 Manitoba Centennial Cup
Tournament details
- Venue(s): Winnipeg, Manitoba
- Dates: May 1992
- Teams: 5

Final positions
- Champions: Thunder Bay Flyers (2nd title)
- Runners-up: Winkler Flyers

Tournament statistics
- Games played: 13
- Scoring leader: Scott Longstaff (Vernon)

Awards
- MVP: Scott Longstaff (Vernon)

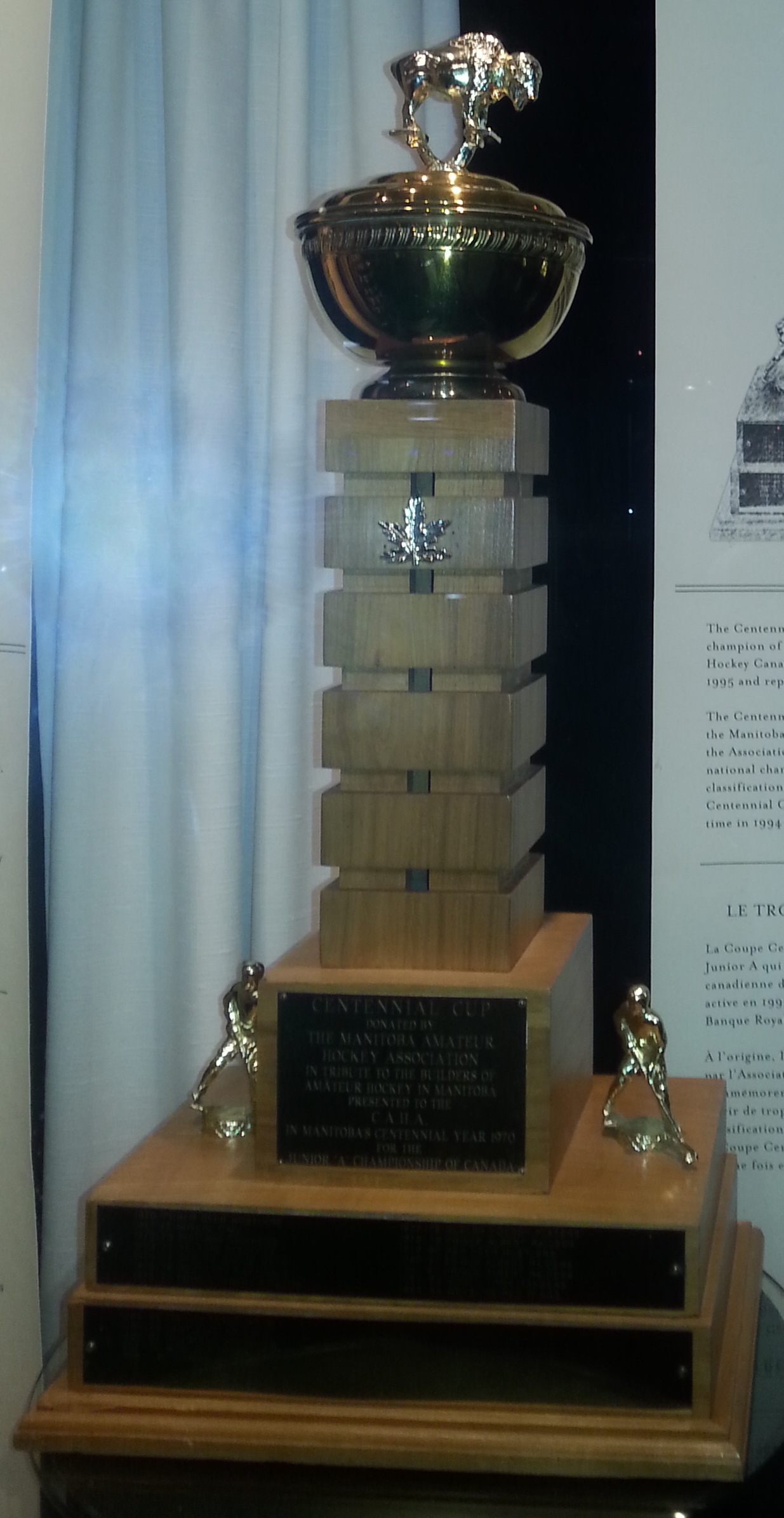
The Centennial Cup

The 1992 Centennial Cup is the 22nd Junior "A" 1992 ice hockey National Championship for the Canadian Junior A Hockey League.

The Centennial Cup was competed for by the winners of the Doyle Cup, Anavet Cup, Central Canadian Championship, the Eastern Canadian Champion and a host city.

The tournament was hosted by the St. James Canadians and Winnipeg, Manitoba.

== The Playoffs ==
The Thunder Bay Flyers coached by Dave Siciliano placed first overall in the 1991–92 United States Hockey League season to win the Anderson Cup, but were defeated by three games to one versus the Dubuque Fighting Saints in the league's playoffs semifinals. The Flyers hosted the Dudley Hewitt Cup tournament in Thunder Bay. They placed second during the round-robin, defeated the Joliette Nationals by a 5–2 score in the semifinals, then defeated the Kanata Valley Lasers by a 5–1 score in the finals. At the Centennial Cup, the Flyers completed the round-robin with two wins and two losses, then defeated the Halifax Mooseheads by an 8–1 score to reach the finals versus the Winkler Flyers. Siciliano recalled in a 2021 interview that, Winkler was "a bigger and more physical team and wanted to wear their black sweaters" as an intimidation tactic. As the home team with the first choice of colours, Siciliano's Flyers wore dark red jerseys and forced Winkler to change into light-coloured jerseys. Siciliano felt that worked in his team's favour as Winkler took penalties early in the game, and his team won by a 10-1 score giving Siciliano a second Centennial Cup championship.

=== Round Robin ===
Pos	League (Ticket)	Team	Pld	W	L	GF	GA	GD	Qualification
1	BCHL (Doyle Cup)	Vernon Lakers	4	3	1	23	16	+7	Semi-final
2	USHL (Dudley Hewitt Cup)	Thunder Bay Flyers	4	2	2	23	20	+3	Semi-final
3	MJAHL (Callaghan Cup)	Halifax Mooseheads	4	2	2	22	22	0	Semi-final
4	MJHL (Anavet Cup)	Winkler Flyers	4	2	2	18	21	−3	Semi-final
5	MJHL (Host)	St. James Canadians	4	1	3	21	28	−7	

==== Results ====
Thunder Bay Flyers defeated St. James Canadians 7-4
Winkler Flyers defeated Halifax Mooseheads 5-3
Vernon Lakers defeated Thunder Bay Flyers 5-4 in Double Overtime
Halifax Mooseheads defeated Vernon Lakers 6-4
Winkler Flyers defeated St. James 8-4
Vernon Lakers defeated St. James 9-3
Thunder Bay Flyers defeated Winkler 9-2
St. James Canadians defeated Halifax 10-4
Halifax Mooseheads defeated Thunder Bay 9-3
Vernon Lakers defeated Winkler 5-3 for the Abbott Cup

=== Semi-finals and Final ===
Semi-finals
1	Vernon Lakers	2
4	Winkler Flyers	5
2	Thunder Bay Flyers	8
3	Halifax Mooseheads	1

Centennial Cup Finals
2	Thunder Bay Flyers	10
4	Winkler Flyers	1

== Awards ==
Most Valuable Player: Scott Longstaff (Vernon Lakers)
Top Scorer: Scott Longstaff (Vernon Lakers)
Most Sportsmanlike Player: Mike Figliomeni (Thunder Bay Flyers)

=== All-Star Team ===
Forward

Scott Longstaff (Vernon Lakers)
Michal Sup (Vernon Lakers)
Glen Thornborough (Winkler Flyers)

Defence

Dane Litke (Winkler Flyers)
Jason Wright (Thunder Bay Flyers)

Goal

Chris Burns (Thunder Bay Flyers)

== Roll of League Champions ==
AJHL: Olds Grizzlys
BCHL: Vernon Lakers
CJHL: Kanata Valley Lasers
MJHL: Winkler Flyers
MJAHL: Halifax Mooseheads
NOJHL: Powassan Hawks
PCJHL: Prince George Spruce Kings
QPJHL: Joliette Nationals
SJHL: Melfort Mustangs

== See also ==
- Canadian Junior A Hockey League
- Royal Bank Cup
- Anavet Cup
- Doyle Cup
- Dudley Hewitt Cup
- Fred Page Cup
- Abbott Cup
- Mowat Cup
