= 1988 Centennial Cup =

1988 Manitoba Centennial Cup

Tournament details
- Venue: Pembroke, Ontario
- Dates: May 1988
- Teams: 4

Final positions
- Champions: Notre Dame Hounds (1st title)
- Runners-up: Halifax Lions
- Third place: Pembroke Lumber Kings
- Fourth place: Thunder Bay Flyers

Tournament statistics
- Games played: 8
- Scoring leader: Rod Brind'Amour (Notre Dame)

Awards
- MVP: Rod Brind'Amour (Notre Dame)

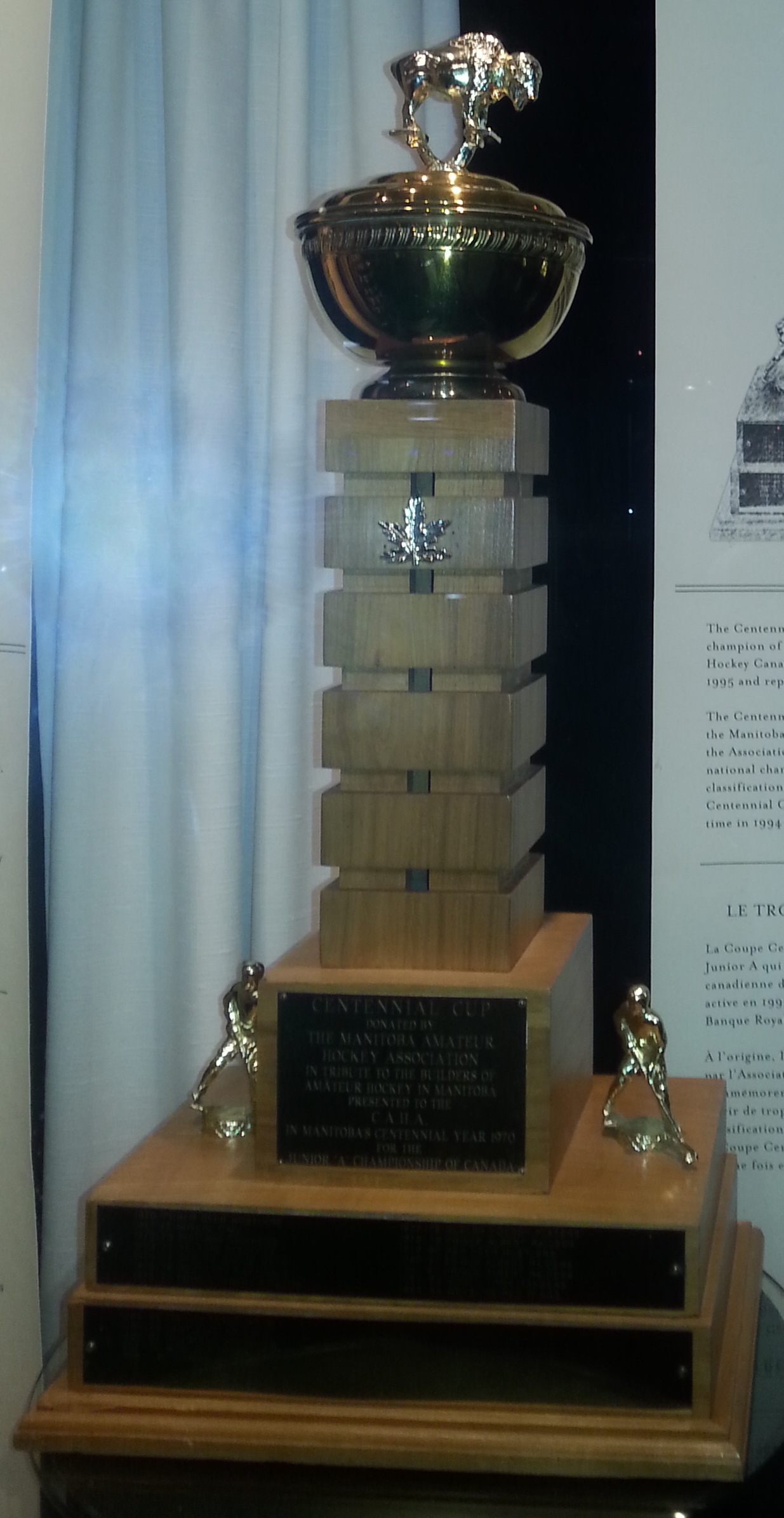
The Centennial Cup

The 1988 Centennial Cup is the 18th Junior "A" 1988 ice hockey National Championship for the Canadian Junior A Hockey League.

The Centennial Cup was competed for by the winners of the Abbott Cup, Dudley Hewitt Cup, the Callaghan Cup, and a 'Host' team.

The tournament was hosted by the Pembroke Lumber Kings in the city of Pembroke, Ontario.

== The Playoffs ==
The Thunder Bay Flyers coached by Dave Siciliano won the United States Hockey League playoffs, despite that the team had 13 rookies. The Ottawa Citizen credited the team's success to its skating ability, puck control and aggressive forechecking. The Pembroke Lumber Kings defeated the Flyers in four consecutive games in the Dudley Hewitt Cup playoffs to determine the Central Canada "Junior A" champion. Since the Lumber Kings hosted the 1988 Centennial Cup tournament and received an automatic berth, the Flyers advanced to the Centennial Cup tournament as the Dudley Hewitt Cup finalists.

=== Round Robin ===
Pos	League (Ticket)	Team	Pld	W	L	GF	GA	GD	Qualification
1	MVJHL (Callaghan Cup)	Halifax Lions	3	2	1	17	14	+3	Final
2	SJHL (Abbott Cup)	Notre Dame Hounds	3	2	1	18	16	+2	Semi-final
3	CJHL (Host)	Pembroke Lumber Kings	3	2	1	15	13	+2	Semi-final
4	USHL (Dudley Hewitt Cup finalists)	Thunder Bay Flyers	3	0	3	15	22	−7	

==== Results ====
Halifax Lions defeated Pembroke Lumber Kings 6-4
Notre Dame Hounds defeated Halifax Lions 6-5
Pembroke Lumber Kings defeated Thunder Bay Flyers 7-4
Notre Dame Hounds defeated Thunder Bay Flyers 9-7
Halifax Lions defeated Thunder Bay Flyers 6-4 OT
Pembroke Lumber Kings defeated Notre Dame Hounds 4-3 3OT

=== Semi-finals and Final ===
Semi-finals			Royal Bank Cup Finals
			1	Halifax Lions	2
2	Notre Dame Hounds	7	3	Notre Dame Hounds	3
3	Pembroke Lumber Kings	3

== Awards ==
Most Valuable Player: Rod Brind'Amour (Notre Dame Hounds)
Top Scorer: Rod Brind'Amour (Notre Dame Hounds)
Most Sportsmanlike Player: Colin Power (Halifax Lions)
Top Defenceman: Kevin Reed (Pembroke Lumber Kings)

=== All-Star Team ===
Forward

Rod Brind'Amour (Notre Dame Hounds)
Duane Saulnier (Halifax Lions)
Brian Downey(Pembroke Lumber Kings)

Defence

Joby Messier (Notre Dame Hounds)
Kevin Reed (Pembroke Lumber Kings)

Goal

Darin Baker (Halifax Lions)

== Roll of League Champions ==
AJHL: Calgary Canucks
BCJHL: Vernon Lakers
CJHL: Pembroke Lumber Kings
IJHL: Summerside Western Capitals
MJHL: Winnipeg South Blues
MVJHL: Halifax Lions
NOJHL: Sudbury Cubs
PCJHL: Grande Prairie North Stars
SJHL: Notre Dame Hounds

== See also ==
- Canadian Junior A Hockey League
- Royal Bank Cup
- Anavet Cup
- Doyle Cup
- Dudley Hewitt Cup
- Fred Page Cup
- Abbott Cup
- Mowat Cup
