= 1987 Centennial Cup =

1987 Manitoba Centennial Cup

Tournament details
- Venue: Humboldt, Saskatchewan
- Dates: May 1987
- Teams: 4

Final positions
- Champions: Richmond Sockeyes (1st title)
- Runners-up: Humboldt Broncos
- Third place: Pembroke Lumber Kings
- Fourth place: Dartmouth Fuel Kids

Tournament statistics
- Games played: 8
- Scoring leader: Jason Phillips (Richmond)

Awards
- MVP: Frank Romeo (Richmond)

The 1987 Centennial Cup is the 17th Junior "A" 1987 ice hockey National Championship for the Canadian Junior A Hockey League.

The Centennial Cup was competed for by the winners of the Abbott Cup, Dudley Hewitt Cup, the Callaghan Cup, and a 'Host' team.

The tournament was hosted by the Humboldt Broncos in the city of Humboldt, Saskatchewan.

== The Playoffs ==
=== Round Robin ===
| Pos | League (Ticket) | Team | Pld | W | L | GF | GA | GD | Qualification |
|---|---|---|---|---|---|---|---|---|---|
| 1 | SJHL (Host) | Humboldt Broncos | 3 | 3 | 0 | 17 | 5 | +12 | Final |
| 2 | BCJHL (Abbott Cup) | Richmond Sockeyes | 3 | 2 | 1 | 12 | 10 | +2 | Semi-final |
| 3 | CJHL (Dudley Hewitt Cup) | Pembroke Lumber Kings | 3 | 1 | 2 | 11 | 12 | −1 | Semi-final |
| 4 | MVJHL (Callaghan Cup) | Dartmouth Fuel Kids | 3 | 0 | 3 | 9 | 22 | −13 | |

==== Results ====
Humboldt Broncos defeated Dartmouth Fuel Kids 7-2
Richmond Sockeyes defeated Dartmouth Fuel Kids 7-3
Humboldt Broncos defeated Pembroke Lumber Kings 4-2
Humboldt Broncos defeated Richmond Sockeyes 6-1
Richmond Sockeyes defeated Pembroke Lumber Kings 4-1
Pembroke Lumber Kings defeated Dartmouth Fuel Kids 8-4

=== Semi-finals and Final ===
| Semi-finals | | | Royal Bank Cup Finals |
| | | | 1 | Humboldt Broncos | 2 |
| 2 | Richmond Sockeyes | 9 | 2 | Richmond Sockeyes | 5 |
| 3 | Pembroke Lumber Kings | 3 |

== Awards ==
Most Valuable Player: Frank Romeo (Richmond Sockeyes)
Top Scorer: Jason Phillips (Richmond Sockeyes)
Most Sportsmanlike Player: Jason Phillips (Richmond Sockeyes)

=== All-Star Team ===
Forward

Bill McDougall (Humboldt Broncos)
Duncan Ryhorchuk (Humboldt Broncos)
Jason Phillips(Richmond Sockeyes)

Defence

Rob Rice (Humboldt Broncos)
Matt Hervey (Richmond Sockeyes)

Goal

Grant Robb (Pembroke Lumber Kings)

== Roll of League Champions ==
AJHL: Red Deer Rustlers
BCJHL: Richmond Sockeyes
CJHL: Pembroke Lumber Kings
IJHL: Charlottetown Abbies
MJHL: Selkirk Steelers
MVJHL: Dartmouth Fuel Kids
NOJHL: Nickel Centre Power Trains
OJHL: Owen Sound Greys
PCJHL: Quesnel Millionaires
SJHL: Humboldt Broncos

== See also ==
- Canadian Junior A Hockey League
- Royal Bank Cup
- Anavet Cup
- Doyle Cup
- Dudley Hewitt Cup
- Fred Page Cup
- Abbott Cup
- Mowat Cup
