= 1991 Centennial Cup =

1991 Manitoba Centennial Cup
Tournament details
- Venue(s): Sudbury, Ontario
- Dates: May 1991
- Teams: 5

Final positions
- Champions: Vernon Lakers (2nd title)
- Runners-up: Sudbury Cubs

Tournament statistics
- Games played: 13
- Scoring leader: Ryan Reynard (Thunder Bay)

Awards
- MVP: Andrew Backen (Thunder Bay)

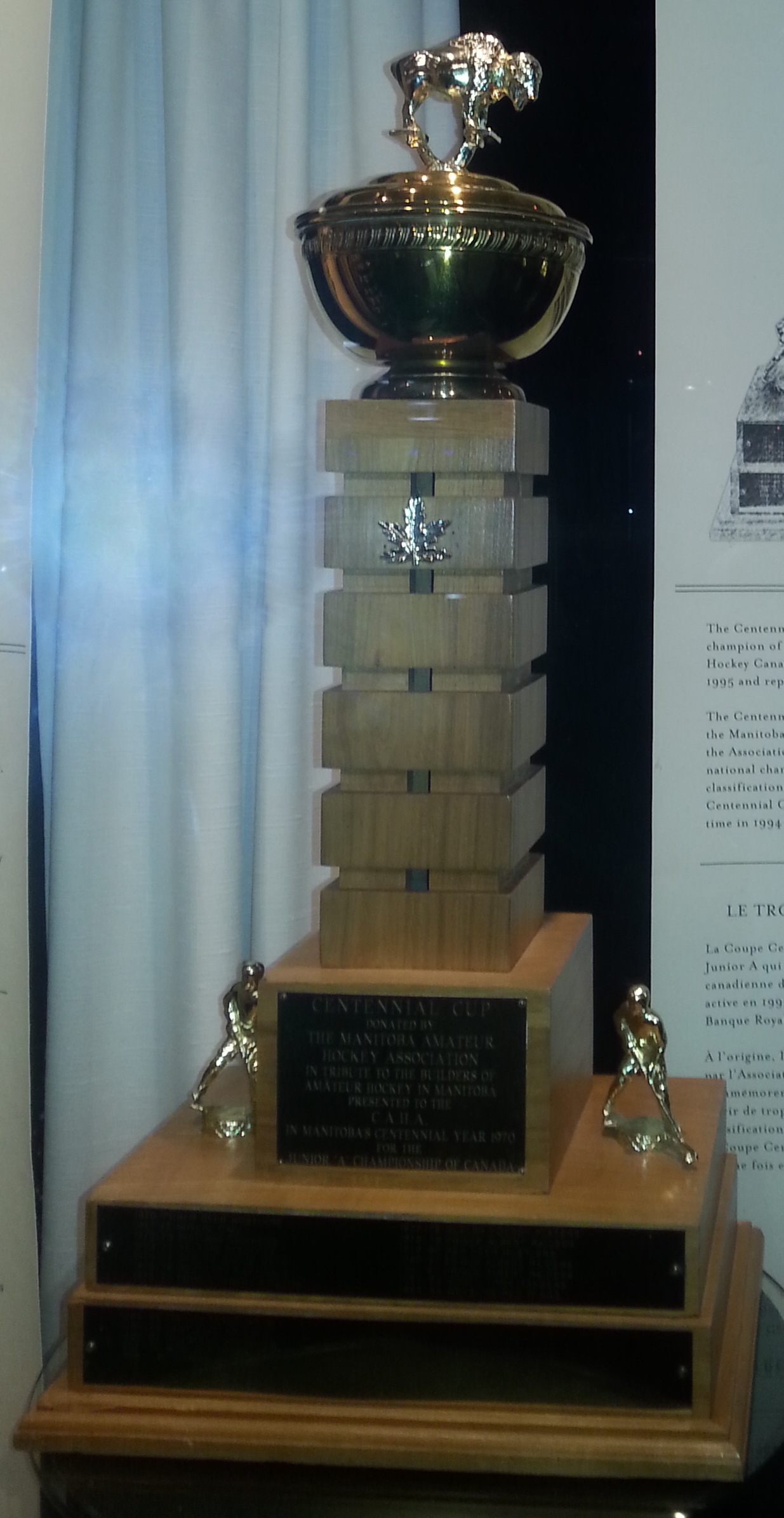
The Centennial Cup

The 1991 Centennial Cup was the 21st Junior "A" 1991 ice hockey National Championship for the Canadian Junior A Hockey League.

The Centennial Cup was competed for by the winners of the Doyle Cup, Anavet Cup, Central Canadian Championship, the Eastern Canadian Champion and a host city.

The tournament was hosted by the Sudbury Cubs and Sudbury, Ontario.

== The Playoffs ==
The Thunder Bay Flyers coached by Dave Siciliano won the Anderson Cup as the United States Hockey League regular season champion, byt lost in the playoffs finals. In the Dudley Hewitt Cup finals versus the Sudbury Cubs, the Flyers won by a 5–1 score.

=== Round Robin ===
Pos	League (Ticket)	Team	Pld	W	L	GF	GA	GD	Qualification
1	SJHL (Anavet Cup)	Yorkton Terriers	4	3	1	22	15	+7	Semi-final
2	MJAHL (Callaghan Cup)	Halifax Jr. Canadians	4	2	2	15	14	+1	Semi-final
3	NOJHL (Host)	Sudbury Cubs	4	2	2	16	21	−5	Semi-final
4	BCJHL (Doyle Cup)	Vernon Lakers	4	2	2	14	20	−6	Semi-final
5	USHL (Dudley Hewitt Cup)	Thunder Bay Flyers	4	1	3	20	17	+3	

==== Results ====
Yorkton Terriers defeated Sudbury Cubs 8-4
Halifax Jr. Canadians defeated Thunder Bay Flyers 5-4
Halifax Jr. Canadians defeated Vernon Lakers 8-3
Thunder Bay Flyers defeated Sudbury Cubs 10-4
Yorkton Terriers defeated Halifax Jr. Canadians 5-2
Vernon Lakers defeated Thunder Bay Flyers 3-2
Vernon Lakers defeated Yorkton Terriers 5-4 in Overtime for the Abbott Cup
Sudbury Cubs defeated Halifax Jr. Canadians 2-0
Yorkton Terriers defeated Thunder Bay Flyers 5-4
Sudbury Cubs defeated Vernon Lakers 6-3

=== Semi-finals and Final ===
Semi-finals
1	Yorkton Terriers	5
4	Vernon Lakers	7
2	Halifax Jr. Canadians	3
3	Sudbury Cubs	5

Centennial Cup Finals
2	Sudbury Cubs	4
4	Vernon Lakers	8

== Awards ==
Most Valuable Player: Andrew Backen (Thunder Bay Flyers)
Top Scorer: Ryan Reynard (Thunder Bay Flyers)
Most Sportsmanlike Player: George Burton (Sudbury Cubs)

=== All-Star Team ===
Forward

Wayne Strachan (Thunder Bay Flyers)
Jason Elders (Vernon Lakers)
Dana Drake (Halifax Jr. Canadians)

Defence

Barry Cummins (Yorkton Terriers)
Andrew Backen (Thunder Bay Flyers)

Goal

Jocelyn Provost (Halifax Jr. Canadians)

== Roll of League Champions ==
AJHL: Calgary Royals
BCHL: Vernon Lakers
CJHL: Hawkesbury Hawks
IJHL: Charlottetown Abbies
MJHL: Winkler Flyers
MVJHL: Halifax Jr. Canadians
NOJHL: Sudbury Cubs
PCJHL: Prince George Spruce Kings
QPJHL: Montreal Olympiques
SJHL: Yorkton Terriers
SJJHL: St. John's Jr. 50's

== See also ==
- Canadian Junior A Hockey League
- Royal Bank Cup
- Anavet Cup
- Doyle Cup
- Dudley Hewitt Cup
- Fred Page Cup
- Abbott Cup
- Mowat Cup
