= Thunder Bay Flyers =

- City: Thunder Bay, Ontario
- League: Thunder Bay Junior Hockey League/ United States Hockey League
- Operated: July 10, 1980–2000
- Home arena: Fort William Gardens
- Colours: Red, black, gold, and white

Franchise history
- 1980–1984: Thunder Bay Kings
- 1984–2000: Thunder Bay Flyers

Championships
- Regular season titles: 4 Anderson Cups (1987–88, 1988–89, 1990–91, and 1991–92)
- Playoff championships: 2 Clark Cups (1988 and 1989)

The Thunder Bay Flyers were a Junior "A" ice hockey team from Thunder Bay, Ontario, Canada.

== History ==
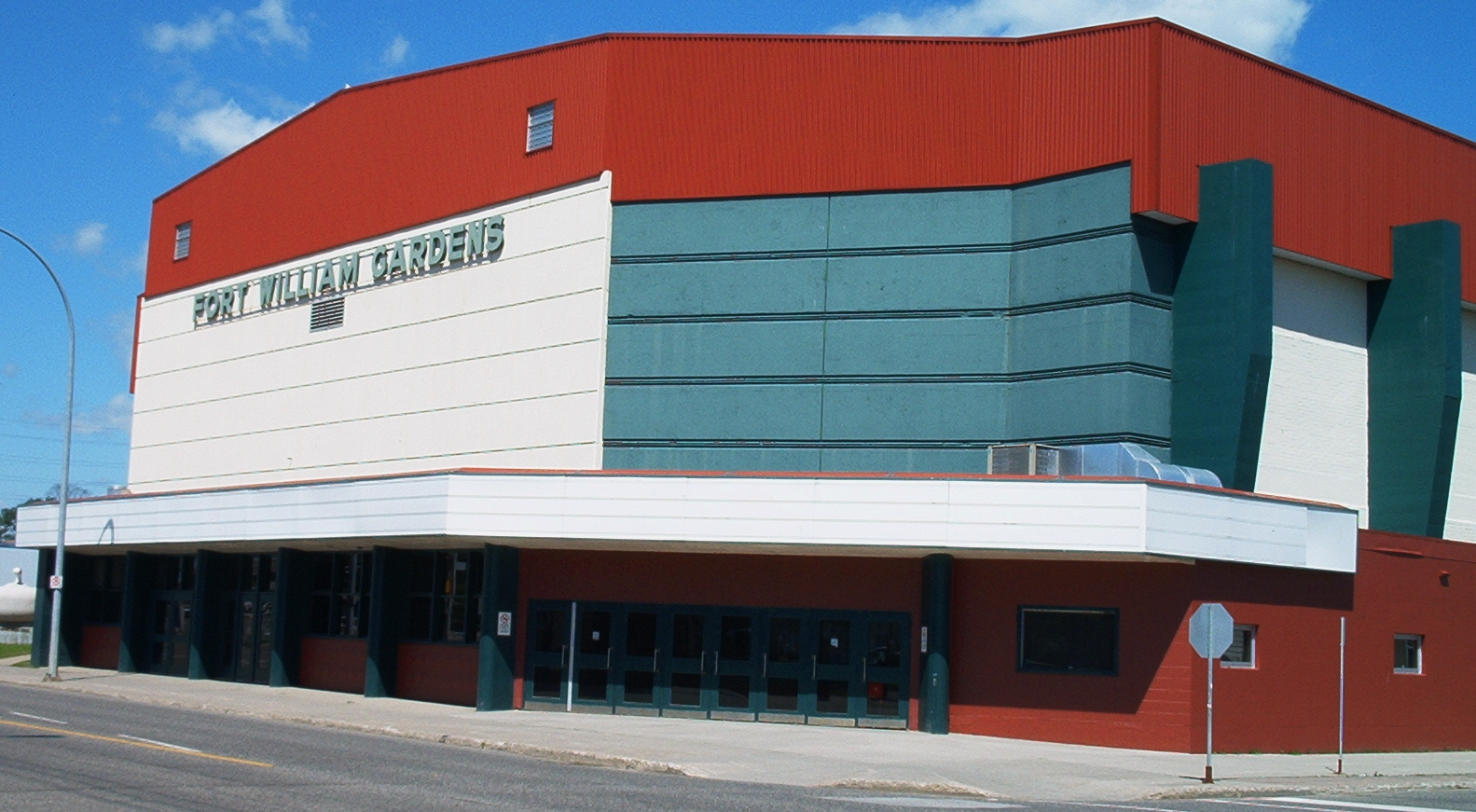
The Fort William Gardens

On July 6, 1980, the Degagne Buccaneers and Thunder Bay North Stars were informed by the TBAHA that they would not be permitted to field teams in the 1980–81 City League. On July 10, 1980, the executive of the Thunder Bay Kings was formed and gave life to the city's premier junior squad for the next twenty years.

From 1980 until 1982, the Kings played in the Thunder Bay Hockey League with the Allan Cup-contending Senior "A" Thunder Bay Twins, the Hardy Cup-contending Intermediate "A" Thunder Bay Blazers, and the Canadian Interuniversity Athletics Union's Lakehead University Nor'westers. Their first season saw them finish in second and meet the Intermediate Blazers in the league semi-final, which the Kings won 3-games-to-2. In the finals, they were swept by the Senior Twins 4-games-to-none. In the second year, the Flyers finished in third and drew the Blazers again. They defeated the Intermediates 3-games-to-1, to meet Lakehead University in the final. Lakehead upset the Twins 3-games-to-1 in the other semi-final. The Kings won the final in seven games to win the City Championship.

In 1982, the Thunder Bay Hockey League was disbanded. The Blazers folded into the Twins, who joined Manitoba's Central Senior A Hockey League. The Kings, the newly formed Thunder Bay Hornets and the Schreiber North Stars Junior "B" hockey teams, formed the Thunder Bay Junior Hockey League. The Kings won the league in 1983. In the 1983-84 season, the North Stars were replaced by the Jr. B Thunder Bay Maple Leafs. The Kings celebrated an 18-game perfect season before winning the city championship for the third straight year.

In 1984, the Thunder Bay Junior Hockey League folded. The Kings changed their name to the Thunder Bay Flyers and jumped to the United States Hockey League (USHL). The Hornets and Maple Leafs merged under the Thunder Bay Hornets banner and jumped to the Manitoba Junior Hockey League.

The Thunder Bay Junior Hockey League folded in 1984. Many former players made the jump to the Ontario Provincial Junior A Hockey League; some went to the then existing version of the Northern Ontario Junior Hockey League; and others to the Manitoba Junior Hockey League. However, due to Thunder Bay's location, the league was closer to Minnesota than the closest franchises in the other Ontario Junior "A" Leagues, and the Thunder Bay Flyers of the defunct Thunder Bay League survived by jumping the border to play in the top tier of American junior hockey, the United States Hockey League, and with some success.

=== 1986 to 1995 ===
Dave Siciliano served as head coach of the Flyers from 1986 to 1993. He led the team to 35 wins and a second-place finish during the 1986–87 season. After defeating the Sioux City Musketeers in the first round of the playoffs, the Flyers lost three games to two versus the Madison Capitols in the second round.

The Flyers won 40 games and placed first overall in the 1987–88 season, which gave Siciliano his first Anderson Cup as the USHL's regular season champion. Despite that his team had 13 rookies, the Flyers had the highest scoring offence in the league and the second best goals against average. The Ottawa Citizen credited the team's success to its skating ability, puck control and aggressive forechecking. The Flyers defeated the Madison Capitols by three games to one in the first round of the playoffs, then defeated the Rochester Mustangs by three games to one in the finals to win the Clark Cup as USHL playoffs champions. The Flyers then participated in the Dudley Hewitt Cup playoffs to determine the Central Canada "Junior A" champion, and lost to the Pembroke Lumber Kings in four consecutive games in the final series. Since the Lumber Kings hosted the 1988 Centennial Cup tournament to determine the Canadian Junior A champion and received an automatic berth, the Flyers advanced to the Centennial Cup tournament as the Dudley Hewitt Cup finalists. The tournament was the first appearance for the Flyers at the Centennial Cup, which saw them lose all three games played and finish in fourth place.

The Dudley Hewitt Cup

Siciliano led the Flyers to 40 wins and placed first overall in the 1988–89 season, to win his second Anderson Cup. In the USHL playoffs, the Flyers defeated the Omaha Lancers in three games in the first round, then defeated the North Iowa Huskies in four games in the second round, then defeated the St. Paul Vulcans in five games to give Siciliano his second Clark Cup championship. The Flyers began the Canadian playoffs undefeated in eight games with series victories versus the Sudbury Cubs and the Pembroke Lumber Kings to give Siciliano his first Dudley Hewitt Cup. Siciliano recalled that the Flyers were not given respect in advance of the 1989 Centennial Cup, and said that "the host Summerside team commented at the coaches press conference that Thunder Bay couldn't be very strong since they played in an American-based league". During the round-robin stage of the tournament, the Flyers earned wins versus the Vernon Lakers and Moncton Hawks, and lost to the Summerside Western Capitals. The Flyers earned a berth in the cup finals based on goal difference among three teams tied for first place, then defeated Summerside by a 4–1 score in the final game to win the Centennial Cup. Siciliano summarized the game by saying, "our team speed and skill over powered Summerside and we were unfazed by the full house and their physical play"; and "believe[d] that team was one of the best junior teams to ever represent Thunder Bay". The Centennial Cup championship was the first for both Siciliano and for any team from Northwestern Ontario.

The Flyers won 31 games and placed third overall in the 1989–90 season. They defeated the St. Paul Vulcans in three games in the first round of the playoffs then were defeated three games to two by the Rochester Mustangs in the semifinals. In the Dudley Hewitt Cup playoffs, the Flyers lost 4 games to 2 versus the Sudbury Cubs in the semifinals.

Siciliano won his third Anderson Cup when the Flyers placed first overall in the 1990–91 season with 36 wins. In the playoffs, the Flyers defeated the North Iowa Huskies in three games in the quarterfinals, defeated the Dubuque Fighting Saints in three games in the semifinals, then lost by three games to one versus the Omaha Lancers in the Clark Cup finals. The Flyers reached the finals of the Dudley Hewitt Cup playoffs versus the Sudbury Cubs, which guaranteed them a berth in the 1991 Centennial Cup tournament since Sudbury was scheduled to host the upcoming national finals. Despite missing four players including their goaltender due to suspensions, the Flyers defeated Sudbury by a 5–1 score to give Siciliano his second Dudley Hewitt Cup championship. In his third appearance at the Centennial Cup tournament, the Flyers placed fifth with one win in four games.

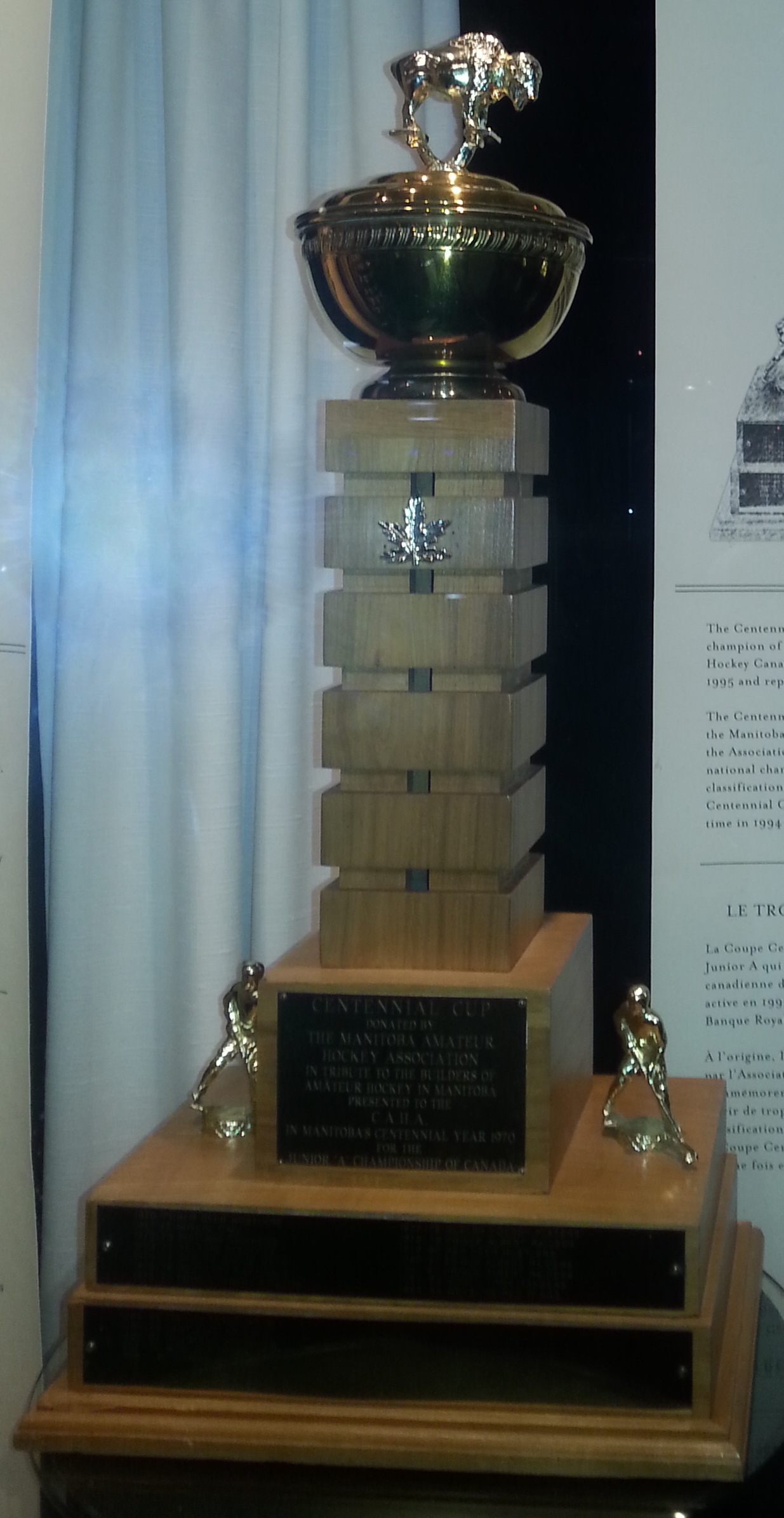
The Centennial Cup

The Flyers won 36 games and placed first overall in the 1991–92 season to give Siciliano his fourth Anderson Cup. In the playoffs, the Flyers defeated the Rochester Mustangs in three consecutive games, then lost by three games to one versus the Dubuque Fighting Saints in the semifinals. The Flyers hosted the 1992 Dudley Hewitt Cup tournament in Thunder Bay. They placed second during the round-robin, defeated the Joliette Nationals by a 5–2 score in the semifinals, then defeated the Kanata Valley Lasers by a 5–1 score in the finals, which gave Siciliano his third Dudley Hewitt Cup. At the 1992 Centennial Cup, the Flyers completed the round-robin with two wins and two losses, then defeated the Halifax Mooseheads by an 8–1 score to reach the finals versus the Winkler Flyers. Siciliano recalled in a 2021 interview that, Winkler was "a bigger and more physical team and wanted to wear their black sweaters" as an intimidation tactic. As the home team with the first choice of colours, Siciliano's Flyers wore dark red jerseys and forced Winkler to change into light-coloured jerseys. Siciliano felt that worked in his team's favour as Winkler took penalties early in the game, and his team won by a 10-1 score giving Siciliano a second Centennial Cup championship.

The Flyers placed fourth overall in the 1992–93 season, defeated the St. Paul Vulcans by three games to two in the first round of the playoffs, then were defeated three games to one by the Omaha Lancers in the second round. In the Dudley Hewitt Cup playoffs, the Flyers reached the semifinals but lost to the Chateauguay Elites. Siciliano resigned as coach of the Flyers after the 1992–93 season, but remained as the team's general manager for the next two seasons.

The Flyers placed sixth overall in the 1993–94 season, lost in the first round of the USHL playoffs in six games to the Omaha Lancers, and were runners-up to the Chateauguay Elites in the Dudley Hewitt Cup finals. The Flyers placed fifth overall in the 1994–95 season, and lost in six games to the Sioux City Musketeers in the first round of the playoffs. After Siciliano won his fourth Dudley Hewitt Cup when the Flyers defeated the Brampton Capitals in the championship game, his team lost to the Calgary Canucks in the 1995 Centennial Cup semifinals.

=== 1996 to 2000 ===
The Flyers played their last game in 2000. The end of the Flyers resulted in the creation of the Superior International Junior Hockey League in 2001 to continue the tradition of the old Thunder Bay Junior Hockey League as a purely local organization. The league has been successful since its founding with its top team being the Fort William North Stars. The departure of the Flyers also sparked the creation of the very successful Lakehead University Thunderwolves men's hockey program, playing in the Ontario Universities Athletics Conference of the CIS (Canadian Interuniversity Sport).

== Season-by-season records ==
Season	GP	W	L	T	OTL	GF	GA	P	Results	Playoffs
1980-81	24	10	14	0	-	173	187	20	2nd TBHL	Lost final, lost DHC SF
1981-82	23	9	14	0	-	119	177	18	3rd TBHL	Won League, lost DHC SF
1982-83	24	21	2	1	-	205	78	43	1st TBJHL	Won League, lost DHC Final
1983-84	18	18	0	0	-	138	51	36	1st TBJHL	Won League, lost DHC SF
1984-85	48	20	25	0	3	250	252	43	7th USHL	
1985-86	48	15	32	0	1	210	300	31	8th USHL	
1986-87	48	35	10	1	2	312	180	73	2nd USHL	
1987-88	48	40	7	1	0	340	168	81	1st USHL	Won League, lost DHC Final, 4th at MCC
1988-89	48	40	6	2	0	340	189	82	1st USHL	Won League, won DHC, won MCC
1989-90	48	31	16	1	0	277	210	63	3rd USHL	Lost DHC SF
1990-91	48	36	10	2	0	293	176	77	1st USHL	Won DHC, 5th at MCC
1991-92	48	36	11	1	0	265	173	74	1st USHL	Won DHC, won MCC
1992-93	48	31	14	2	1	243	163	65	4th USHL	Lost DHC SF
1993-94	48	26	20	1	1	214	203	54	6th USHL	Lost DHC Final
1994-95	48	27	18	1	2	216	184	57	5th USHL	Won DHC, lost MCC SF
1995-96	46	13	29	1	3	136	202	30	11th USHL	Lost DHC SF
1996-97	54	19	33	0	2	186	251	40	6th USHL-N	DNQ
1997-98	56	20	31	0	5	165	227	45	5th USHL-N	DNQ
1998-99	56	19	30	0	7	164	247	45	2nd USHL-C	Lost quarter-final
1999-00	58	18	39	0	1	164	254	37	6th USHL-E	DNQ
USHL Totals	798	426	331	13	28	3775	3379	0.534		

=== Playoffs ===
- 1981 Lost final, lost Dudley Hewitt Cup semi-final

Thunder Bay Kings defeated Lakehead Nor'Westers 3-games-to-none
Thunder Bay Twins defeated Thunder Bay Kings 4-games-to-none
Belleville Bulls (OPJHL) defeated Thunder Bay Kings 4-games-to-1

- 1982 Won League, lost Dudley Hewitt Cup semi-final

Thunder Bay Kings defeated Thunder Bay Blazers 3-games-to-1
Thunder Bay Kings defeated Lakehead Nor'Westers 4-games-to-3 TBHL CHAMPIONS
Guelph Platers (OJHL) defeated Thunder Bay Kings 3-games-to-none

- 1983 Won League, lost Dudley Hewitt Cup final

Thunder Bay Kings defeated Thunder Bay Hornets 3-games-to-none TBJHL CHAMPIONS
Thunder Bay Kings defeated Ottawa Jr. Senators (CJHL) 4-games-to-3
North York Rangers (OJHL) defeated Thunder Bay Kings 4-games-to-none

- 1984 Won League, lost Dudley Hewitt Cup quarter-final

Thunder Bay Kings defeated Thunder Bay Hornets 4-games-to-1 with 1 tie TBJHL CHAMPIONS
Pembroke Lumber Kings (CJHL) defeated Thunder Bay Kings 4-games-to-none

- 1985
- 1986
- 1987
- 1988 Won League, lost Dudley Hewitt Cup final, lost in 1988 Centennial Cup round robin

Thunder Bay Flyers defeated Waterloo Black Hawks 3-games-to-none
Thunder Bay Flyers defeated Madison Capitols 3-games-to-1
Thunder Bay Flyers defeated Rochester Mustangs 3-games-to-1 USHL CHAMPIONS
Thunder Bay Flyers defeated Sudbury Cubs (NOJHL) 4-games-to-none
Pembroke Lumber Kings (CenJHL) defeated Thunder Bay Flyers 4-games-to-none
Fourth and eliminated in 1988 Centennial Cup round robin (0-3)

- 1989 Won League, won Dudley Hewitt Cup, won 1989 Centennial Cup

Thunder Bay Flyers defeated Omaha Lancers 3-games-to-none
Thunder Bay Flyers defeated North Iowa Huskies 3-games-to-1
Thunder Bay Flyers defeated St. Paul Vulcans 3-games-to-2 USHL CHAMPIONS
Thunder Bay Flyers defeated Sudbury Cubs (NOJHL) 4-games-to-none
Thunder Bay Flyers defeated Pembroke Lumber Kings (CJHL) 4-games-to-none DUDLEY HEWITT CUP CHAMPIONS
First in 1989 Centennial Cup round robin (2-1)
Thunder Bay Flyers defeated Summerside Western Capitals (IJHL) 4-1 in final CENTENNIAL CUP CHAMPIONS

- 1990 Lost semi-final, lost Dudley Hewitt Cup semi-final

Thunder Bay Flyers defeated St. Paul Vulcans 3-games-to-none
Rochester Mustangs defeated Thunder Bay Flyers 3-games-to-2
Sudbury Cubs (NOJHL) defeated Thunder Bay Flyers 4-games-to-2

- 1991 Lost final, won Dudley Hewitt Cup, lost in 1991 Centennial Cup round robin

Thunder Bay Flyers defeated North Iowa Huskies 3-games-to-none
Thunder Bay Flyers defeated Dubuque Fighting Saints 3-games-to-none
Omaha Lancers defeated Thunder Bay Flyers 3-games-to-1
Second in Dudley Hewitt Cup round robin (2-2)
Thunder Bay Flyers defeated Montreal Olympiques (QPJHL) 10-0 in semi-final
Thunder Bay Flyers defeated Sudbury Cubs (NOJHL) 5-1 in final DUDLEY HEWITT CUP CHAMPIONS
Fifth and eliminated in 1991 Centennial Cup round robin (1-3)

- 1992 Lost semi-final, won Dudley Hewitt Cup, won 1992 Centennial Cup

Thunder Bay Flyers defeated Rochester Mustangs 3-games-to-none
Dubuque Fighting Saints defeated Thunder Bay Flyers 3-games-to-1
Second in Dudley Hewitt Cup round robin (2-1)
Thunder Bay Flyers defeated Joliette Nationals (QPJHL) 5-2 in semi-final
Thunder Bay Flyers defeated Kanata Valley Lasers (CJHL) in final DUDLEY HEWITT CUP CHAMPIONS
Second in 1992 Centennial Cup round robin (2-2)
Thunder Bay Flyers defeated Halifax Mooseheads (MJAHL) 8-1 in semi-final
Thunder Bay Flyers defeated Winkler Flyers (MJHL) 10-1 in final CENTENNIAL CUP CHAMPIONS

- 1993 Lost semi-final, lost Dudley Hewitt Cup semi-final

Thunder Bay Flyers defeated St. Paul Vulcans
Omaha Lancers defeated Thunder Bay Flyers 3-games-to-1
First in Dudley Hewitt Cup round robin (3-1)
Chateauguay Elites (QPJHL) defeated Thunder Bay Flyers 3-1 in semi-final

- 1994 Lost Dudley Hewitt Cup final

First in Dudley Hewitt Cup round robin (3-1)
Thunder Bay Flyers defeated Caledon Canadians (MetJHL) 4-3 in semi-final
Chateauguay Elites (QPJHL) 9-5 in final

- 1995 Won Dudley Hewitt Cup, lost 1995 Centennial Cup semi-final'

Second in Dudley Hewitt Cup round robin (2-1)
Thunder Bay Flyers defeated Caledon Canadians (MetJHL) 7-1 in semi-final
Thunder Bay Flyers defeated Brampton Capitals (OPJHL) 6-4 in final DUDLEY HEWITT CUP CHAMPIONS
Fourth in 1995 Centennial Cup round robin (2-2)
Calgary Canucks (AJHL) defeated Thunder Bay Flyers 5-3 in semi-final

- 1996 Lost Dudley Hewitt Cup semi-final

Third in Dudley Hewitt Cup round robin (2-2)
Newmarket 87's (OPJHL) defeated Thunder Bay Flyers 6-3 in semi-final

- 1997 DNQ
- 1998 DNQ
- 1999 Lost quarter-final

Green Bay Gamblers defeated Thunder Bay Flyers 3-games-to-none

- 2000 DNQ

== Championships ==
- Thunder Bay City Champions: 1982, 1983, 1984
- Anderson Cup USHL Regular Season Champions: 1988, 1989, 1991, 1992
- Canadian National Centennial Cup Championships: 1989, 1992
- Clark Cup USHL Champions: 1988, 1989
- Dudley Hewitt Cup Central Canadian Champions: 1989, 1991, 1992, 1995

== Centennial Cups/Royal Bank Cups ==
=== 1988 ===
Round Robin

Pembroke Lumber Kings (CJHL) defeated Thunder Bay Flyers 7-4
Notre Dame Hounds (SJHL) defeated Thunder Bay Flyers 9-7
Halifax Lions (MJAHL) defeated Thunder Bay Flyers 6-4 (OT)

=== 1989 ===
Round Robin

Thunder Bay Flyers defeated Vernon Lakers (BCJHL) 8-2
Summerside Capitals (IJHL) defeated Thunder Bay Flyers 5-4
Thunder Bay Flyers defeated Moncton Hawks (MJAHL) 6-2

Final

Thunder Bay Flyers defeated Summerside Capitals (IJHL) 4-1

=== 1991 ===
Round Robin

Halifax Jr. Canadians (MJAHL) defeated Thunder Bay Flyers 5-4
Thunder Bay Flyers defeated Sudbury Cubs (NOJHL) 10-4
Vernon Lakers (BCJHL) defeated Thunder Bay Flyers 3-2
Yorkton Terriers (SJHL) defeated Thunder Bay Flyers 5-4

=== 1992 ===
Round Robin

Thunder Bay Flyers defeated St. James Canadians (MJHL) 7-4
Vernon Lakers (BCJHL) defeated Thunder Bay Flyers 5-4 (2OT)
Thunder Bay Flyers defeated Winkler Flyers (MJHL) 9-2
Halifax Mooseheads (MJAHL) defeated Thunder Bay Flyers 9-3

Semi-final

Thunder Bay Flyers defeated Halifax Mooseheads (MJAHL) 8-1

Final

Thunder Bay Flyers defeated Winkler Flyers (MJHL) 10-1

=== 1995 ===
Round Robin

Winnipeg South Blues (MJHL) defeated Thunder Bay Flyers 6-4
Calgary Canucks (AJHL) defeated Thunder Bay Flyers 6-0
Thunder Bay Flyers defeated Gloucester Rangers (CJAHL) 5-2
Thunder Bay Flyers defeated Joliette National (LHJAAAQ) 5-2

Semi-final

Calgary Canucks (AJHL) defeated Thunder Bay Flyers 5-3

== Notable alumni ==
- Rick Adduono (Coach)
- Peter Bakovic
- Jozef Balej
- David Bruce
- Ryan Caldwell
- Tony Hrkac
- Greg Johnson
- Ryan Johnson
- David Latta
- Aaron MacKenzie
- Brent Peterson
- Sean Pronger
- Patrick Sharp
- Richard Shulmistra
- Mike Tomlak

== See also ==
- Superior International Junior Hockey League
- Thunder Bay Junior Hockey League
- United States Hockey League
- Hockey Northwestern Ontario
- Canadian Junior A Hockey League
- Dudley Hewitt Cup
- Royal Bank Cup

Preceded by Notre Dame Hounds	Centennial Cup Champions; 1989	Succeeded by Vernon Vipers
Preceded by Vernon Vipers	Centennial Cup Champions; 1992	Succeeded by Kelowna Spartans
