= Centennial Cup =

Canadian junior ice hockey championship since 1967

- Most recent season or competition: 2026 Centennial Cup
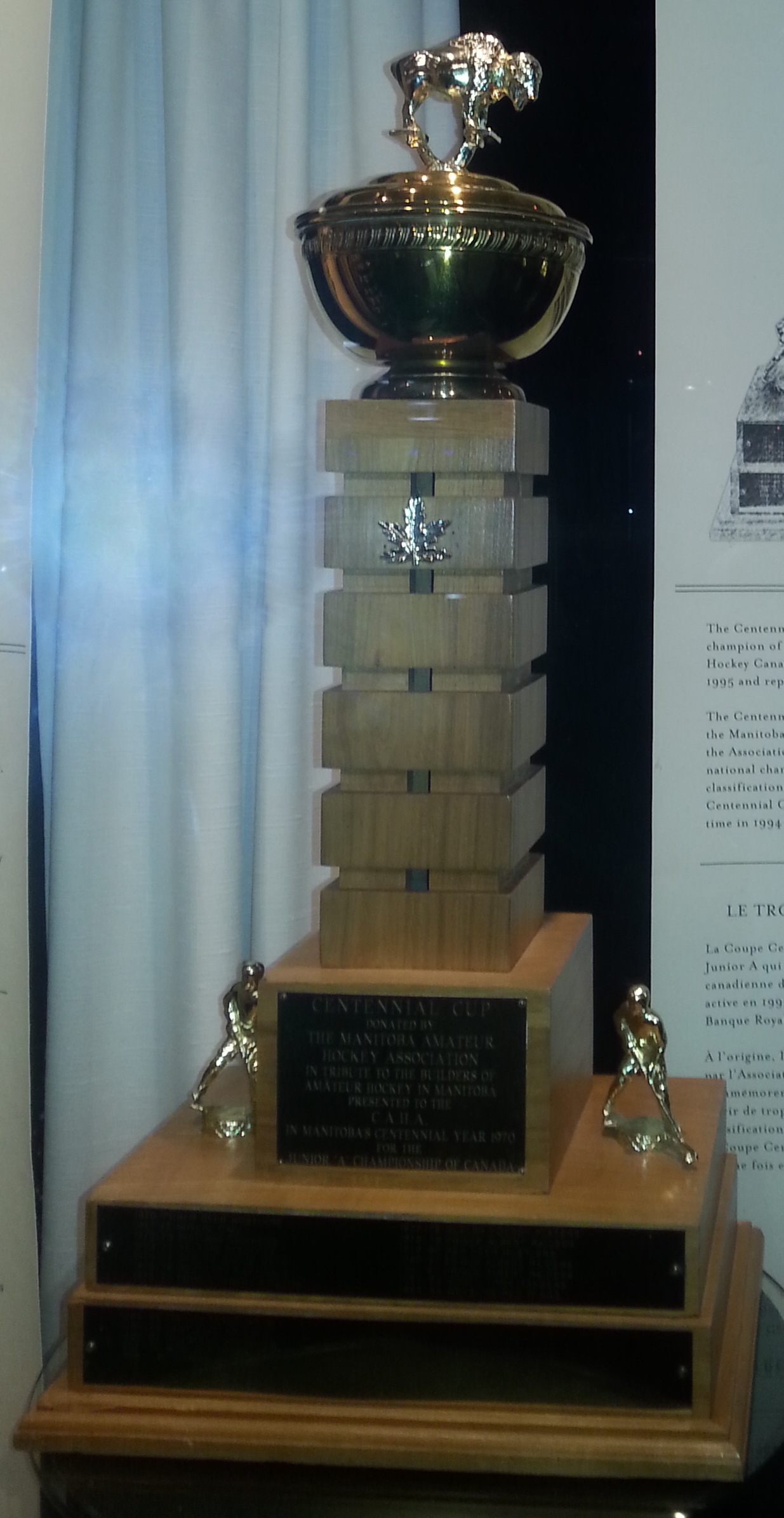
- Formerly: Manitoba Centennial Cup (1971–1995); Royal Bank Cup (1996–2018); National Junior A Championship (2019); Centennial Cup (2020–present)
- Sport: Ice hockey
- First season: 1971
- Country: Canada
- Most recent champion: Niverville Nighthawks (2026)
- Most titles: Vernon Vipers (6)
- Broadcaster: TSN
- Sponsors: Hockey Canada; Canadian Junior Hockey League
- Related competitions: CJHL member league championships (Note: Through to 2019, each member league's cup champion competed in tournaments for regional cups, reducing the number of competitors in the eventual national championship. The numerous cups of the league and regional championships are addressed in this article. The regional competitions were dropped after the 2020 and 2021 tournaments were cancelled due to the COVID-19 pandemic, by which time the British Columbia Hockey League had also withdrawn from the CJHL, with nine league champions plus a host team then deemed a manageable national championship tournament.)
- Website: www.hockeycanada.ca/en-ca/national-championships/men/national-junior-a/2026

The Centennial Cup is an annual ice hockey tournament organized by Hockey Canada and the Canadian Junior Hockey League (CJHL), which determines the national champion of junior A hockey. It consists of a ten-team round robin featuring the winners of all nine CJHL member leagues as well as a pre-selected host city.

The championship has also been known as the National Junior A Championship in 2019, it was formerly known as the Royal Bank Cup from 1996 to 2018 and the Manitoba Centennial Cup from 1971 to 1995. It is currently branded as the Centennial Cup after Tim Hortons, the title sponsor of the 2022 tournament, withdrew future sponsorship in response to the Hockey Canada sexual assault scandal.

== History ==
The Manitoba Centennial Trophy was presented to the Canadian Amateur Hockey Association (CAHA) by the Manitoba Amateur Hockey Association (MAHA) to commemorate their centennial year of 1970. At that time, the CAHA reconfigured their junior tiers, creating two separate classifications – Major junior and Junior A. The major junior teams were grouped into the three regional leagues that made up the Canadian Major Junior Hockey League (CMJHL), while the Junior A tier included the remaining junior teams in the provincial/regional leagues that later formed the Canadian Junior Hockey League. It was determined that the Memorial Cup, which had served as the CAHA's national championship tournament, would become the new championship trophy for the CMJHL while the Manitoba Centennial Trophy served as the trophy for the champions of the new Junior A division. Earl Dawson and Bill Addison were the named initial trustees of the trophy, both of whom were past presidents of the MAHA. The tournament subsequently became known as the Centennial Cup.

From 1971 to 1978 and from 1982 to 1984, the Centennial Cup pitted the Abbott Cup champion (Western Canada) versus the Dudley Hewitt Cup champion (Eastern Canada). A three-team tournament format, splitting Eastern Canada into two regions, was introduced in 1979 and used until 1981. The Centennial Cup permanently moved back to the tournament format in 1986, with the addition of a predetermined host team to the field. It later expanded to a five-team tournament in 1990 when the Abbott Cup series was discontinued in favour of allowing both the ANAVET and Doyle Cup winners to advance to the national championship. For the 1996 tournament, the trophy gained a sponsor and became the Royal Bank Cup. The ANAVET and Doyle Cups were temporarily replaced by the Western Canada Cup, which determined the two Western seeds for the Royal Bank Cup, from 2013 to 2017. During this time, the Brooks Bandits of the Alberta Junior Hockey League won the 2013 Royal Bank Cup, where they had gained entry into the tournament as the Western Canada Cup runner-up making them the first team in Centennial Cup/Royal Bank Cup history to win the national championship without being the host or a regional champion.

Overtime is common as the Junior A championships with the longest game in the tournament's history started on May 12, 2007, at 2007 Royal Bank Cup between the Camrose Kodiaks of the Alberta Junior Hockey League and the host Prince George Spruce Kings of the British Columbia Hockey League. The Spruce Kings won the game 3–2 6:01 into the fifth overtime period. The game lasted 146:01, just short of the CJAHL record set by the Toronto Jr. Canadiens and the Pickering Panthers in the 2007 Ontario Provincial Junior A Hockey League playoffs (154:32).

After the 2018 Royal Bank Cup, Royal Bank of Canada ended their sponsorship agreement with the Canadian Junior Hockey League. After going by the name National Junior A Championship in 2019, the CJHL and Hockey Canada reverted the title back to its original name — the Centennial Cup — for its 50th anniversary in 2020. In December 2019, Tim Hortons was unveiled by Hockey Canada as the presenting sponsor for the Centennial Cup. The 2020 and 2021 tournaments were later cancelled due to the COVID-19 pandemic, the only times the championship has not been played since 1970.

== Format ==
Since 2022, the field of competition includes the championship teams from the 9 leagues that collectively make up the CJHL and a pre-selected host team. If the pre-selected host team wins its league championship, as was the case in 2022 and 2025, then the runner-up from the same league is also admitted.

Teams are randomly assigned to Group A or Group B. During the preliminary round robin phase, each team plays each other team in their group once. Three points are awarded for a win in regulation time, two points for a win in overtime or shootout, one point for a loss in overtime or shootout, and no points were awarded for a loss in regulation time. The first-place team in each group advances to the semifinals, while the second and third-place teams advance to the quarterfinals. The fourth and fifth-place teams in each group are eliminated from competition.

== Champions by era ==
=== Manitoba Centennial Trophy (1971–1995) ===
The Red Deer Rustlers of the Alberta Junior Hockey League defeated the Charlottetown Islanders of the Island Junior Hockey League in 1971 to claim the inaugural Canadian Junior A championship and Manitoba Centennial Trophy.

The 1972 Centennial Cup gained national attention when the Guelph CMC's of the Southern Ontario Junior A Hockey League were in the final game of a four-game sweep of the Red Deer Rustlers and their leading scorer Paul Fendley lost his helmet during a body check and struck his head on the ice, knocking him into a coma. The National Hockey League prospect regained consciousness and died two days later from head trauma.

The 1990 Centennial Cup marked the only year that the national championship was decided between two teams from the same province or league. The host Vernon Lakers defeated the New Westminster Royals 6–5 in overtime to win the national championship. Both teams were members of the British Columbia Junior Hockey League.

The final Centennial Cup from this era was awarded to the Calgary Canucks of the Alberta Junior Hockey League in 1995.

Note: Champions are in bold.

Year	Eastern Finalist	Western Finalist	Scores (best-of-7)	Primary location
1971	Charlottetown Islanders	**Red Deer Rustlers**	2–4 (**3–6**, **3–7**, 6–4, **4–7**, 7–2, **4–7**)	Charlottetown, Prince Edward Island
1972	**Guelph CMC's**	Red Deer Rustlers	4–0 (**4–2**, **3–2**, **3–1**, **3–0**)	Guelph, Ontario
1973	Pembroke Lumber Kings	**Portage Terriers**	1–4 (**5–6** OT, **2–4**, **1–3**, 6–4, **2–4**)	Portage la Prairie, Manitoba
1974	Smiths Falls Bears	**Selkirk Steelers**	3–4 (**4–5**, **4–7**, 3–0, **1–2**, 6–4, 5–4 OT, **0–1** OT)	Nepean, Ontario
1975	Guelph Biltmore Mad Hatters	**Spruce Grove Mets**	2–4 (4–2, 3–2, **1–4**, **2–5**, **3–6**, **4–6**)	Edmonton, Alberta
1976	**Rockland Nationals**	Spruce Grove Mets	4–1 (**9–4**, **7–1**, **5–3**, 3–4, **7–3**)	Rockland, Ontario
1977	Pembroke Lumber Kings	**Prince Albert Raiders**	0–4 (**4–6**, **4–5**, **3–6**, **3–4**)	Prince Albert, Saskatchewan
1978	**Guelph Platers**	Prince Albert Raiders	4–0 (**7–2**, **6–2**, **6–3**, **8–2**)	Guelph, Ontario
Year	Champion	Runner-up	Score	Location
1979	**Prince Albert Raiders**	Sherwood-Parkdale Metros	5–4 OT	Prince Albert, Saskatchewan
1980	**Red Deer Rustlers**	North York Rangers	3–2	North York, Ontario
1981	**Prince Albert Raiders**	Belleville Bulls	6–2	Halifax, Nova Scotia
Year	Eastern Finalist	Western Finalist	Scores (best-of-7)	Primary location
1982	Guelph Platers	**Prince Albert Raiders**	0–4 (**4–9**, **3–7**, **3–6**, **4–8**)	Prince Albert, Saskatchewan
1983	**North York Rangers**	Abbotsford Flyers	4–0 (**9–6**, **8–5**, **10–3**, **10–2**)	North York, Ontario
1984	Orillia Travelways	**Weyburn Red Wings**	3–4 (6–5, **4–6**, **4–7**, 2–1, 8–5, **4–5**, **0–3**)	Weyburn, Saskatchewan
Year	Champion	Runner-up	Score	Location
1985	**Orillia Travelways**	Penticton Knights	4–2	Orillia, Ontario
1986	**Penticton Knights**	Cole Harbour Colts	7–4	Cole Harbour, Nova Scotia
1987	**Richmond Sockeyes**	Humboldt Broncos	5–2	Humboldt, Saskatchewan
1988	**Notre Dame Hounds**	Halifax Lions	3–2	Pembroke, Ontario
1989	**Thunder Bay Flyers**	Summerside Western Capitals	4–1	Summerside, Prince Edward Island
1990	**Vernon Lakers**	New Westminster Royals	6–5 OT	Vernon, British Columbia
1991	**Vernon Lakers**	Sudbury Cubs	8–4	Sudbury, Ontario
1992	**Thunder Bay Flyers**	Winkler Flyers	10–1	Winnipeg, Manitoba
1993	**Kelowna Spartans**	Chateauguay Elites	7–2	Amherst, Nova Scotia
1994	**Olds Grizzlys**	Kelowna Spartans	5–4 OT	Olds, Alberta
1995	**Calgary Canucks**	Gloucester Rangers	5–4 OT	Gloucester, Ontario

=== Royal Bank Cup (1996–2018) ===
Every tournament in the Royal Bank Cup era was played as a round-robin tournament between five teams. In May 1996, the inaugural Royal Bank Cup was held in Melfort, Saskatchewan. The first winner of the Royal Bank Cup was the Vernon Vipers of the British Columbia Hockey League.

Year	Champion	Runner-up	Score	Location
1996	Vernon Vipers	Melfort Mustangs	2–0	Melfort, Saskatchewan
1997	Summerside Western Capitals	South Surrey Eagles	4–3	Summerside, Prince Edward Island
1998	South Surrey Eagles	Weyburn Red Wings	4–1	Nanaimo, British Columbia
1999	Vernon Vipers	Charlottetown Abbies	9–3	Yorkton, Saskatchewan
2000	Fort McMurray Oil Barons	Rayside-Balfour Sabrecats	2–1	Fort McMurray, Alberta
2001	Camrose Kodiaks	Flin Flon Bombers	5–0	Flin Flon, Manitoba
2002	Halifax Oland Exports	OCN Blizzard	3–1	Halifax, Nova Scotia
2003	Humboldt Broncos	Camrose Kodiaks	3–1	Charlottetown, Prince Edward Island
2004	Aurora Tigers	Kindersley Klippers	7–1	Grande Prairie, Alberta
2005	Weyburn Red Wings	Camrose Kodiaks	3–2	Weyburn, Saskatchewan
2006	Burnaby Express	Yorkton Terriers	8–2	Brampton, Ontario
2007	Aurora Tigers	Prince George Spruce Kings	3–1	Prince George, British Columbia
2008	Humboldt Broncos	Camrose Kodiaks	1–0	Cornwall, Ontario
2009	Vernon Vipers	Humboldt Broncos	2–0	Victoria, British Columbia
2010	Vernon Vipers	Dauphin Kings	8–1	Dauphin, Manitoba
2011	Pembroke Lumber Kings	Vernon Vipers	2–0	Camrose, Alberta
2012	Penticton Vees	Woodstock Slammers	4–3	Humboldt, Saskatchewan
2013	Brooks Bandits	Summerside Western Capitals	3–1	Summerside, Prince Edward Island
2014	Yorkton Terriers	Carleton Place Canadians	4–3 OT	Vernon, British Columbia
2015	Portage Terriers	Carleton Place Canadians	5–2	Portage la Prairie, Manitoba
2016	West Kelowna Warriors	Lloydminster Bobcats	4–0	Lloydminster, Saskatchewan
2017	Cobourg Cougars	Brooks Bandits	3–2 OT	Cobourg, Ontario
2018	Chilliwack Chiefs	Wellington Dukes	4–2	Chilliwack, British Columbia

=== National Junior A Championship (2019) ===
In 2018, the championship was renamed the National Junior A Championship after the Royal Bank of Canada dropped their sponsorship of the event.

Year	Champion	Runner-up	Score	Location
2019	**Brooks Bandits**	Prince George Spruce Kings	4–3	Brooks, Alberta

=== Centennial Cup (2020–present) ===
With the national championship scheduled to return to Manitoba for its 50th anniversary in 2020, Hockey Canada and the Canadian Junior Hockey League announced that the championship return to its original name, the Centennial Cup.

Year	Champion	Runner-up	Score	Location
2020	Cancelled due to COVID-19 pandemic (Note: Hockey Canada and the CJHL cancelled the 2020 and 2021 Centennial Cups in response to the coronavirus pandemic)			Portage la Prairie, Manitoba
2021	Cancelled due to COVID-19 pandemic			Penticton, British Columbia
2022	**Brooks Bandits**	Pickering Panthers	4–1	Estevan, Saskatchewan
2023	**Brooks Bandits**	Battlefords North Stars	4–0	Portage la Prairie, Manitoba
2024	**Collingwood Blues**	Melfort Mustangs	1–0	Oakville, Ontario
2025	**Calgary Canucks**	Melfort Mustangs	7–2	Calgary, Alberta
2026	**Niverville Nighthawks**	Summerside Western Capitals	4–1	Summerside, Prince Edward Island

== Most championships by province ==
The Pembroke Lumber Kings won the 2011 Royal Bank Cup, and became the first Central Canada Hockey League (CCHL) team to win the National Junior A Championship since the 1976 champion Rockland Nationals. In 2015, the Portage Terriers broke a 41-year drought for the Manitoba Junior Hockey League (MJHL), being the first team to win the Junior A championship since the 1974 Selkirk Steelers. Collectively, the Maritime provinces have only won two championships whereas no teams from the Quebec Junior Hockey League (QJHL), Superior International Junior Hockey League (SIJHL), or the Northern Ontario Junior Hockey League (NOJHL) have won the Junior A championship to date.

Rank	Province	Champions	Hosts
1	British Columbia	14	6
2	Ontario	12	14
3	Alberta	11	6 (Note: The 2016 Royal Bank Cup was hosted by the Lloydminster Bobcats, members of the Alberta Junior Hockey League, who played their games in an arena on the Saskatchewan side of their biprovincial border city. This table counts Alberta as that year's champion, and Saskatchewan as that year's host.)
4	Saskatchewan	10	11
5	Manitoba	4	6
6	Prince Edward Island	1	5
7	Nova Scotia	1	4

== Most championships by team ==
There has been a consecutive national champion on four occasions: the Prince Albert Raiders won in 1981 and 1982, while Vernon won in 1990 and 1991 (as the Lakers), and again in 2009 and 2010 (as the Vipers), and the Brooks Bandits in 2022 and 2023.

The Prince Albert Raiders also hold a record for appearing in the championship final three consecutive times, in 1977, 1978 and 1979. The Raiders also reached the national finals five times in six years (1977, 1978, 1979, 1981, 1982), while winning a total of four championships (1977, 1979, 1981, 1982) during that span. The Raiders joined the Western Hockey League (WHL) as a major junior team following their 1982 Junior A championship, and won the Memorial Cup soon after in 1985.

Team	Province	League	Champions
Vernon Lakers/Vipers	British Columbia	BCHL	6 (1990, 1991, 1996, 1999, 2009, 2010)
Brooks Bandits	Alberta	AJHL	4 (2013, 2019, 2022, 2023)
Prince Albert Raiders	Saskatchewan	SJHL	4 (1977, 1979, 1981, 1982)
Aurora Tigers	Ontario	OPJHL	2 (2004, 2007)
Guelph CMC's/Platers	Ontario	SOJHL/OPJHL	2 (1972, 1978)
Humboldt Broncos	Saskatchewan	SJHL	2 (2003, 2008)
Penticton Knights/Vees	British Columbia	BCJHL/BCHL	2 (1986, 2012)
Portage Terriers	Manitoba	MJHL	2 (1973, 2015)
Red Deer Rustlers	Alberta	AJHL	2 (1971, 1980)
Thunder Bay Flyers	Ontario	USHL	2 (1989, 1992)
Weyburn Red Wings	Saskatchewan	SJHL	2 (1984, 2005)
Burnaby Express	British Columbia	BCHL	1 (2006)
Calgary Canucks	Alberta	AJHL	2 (1995, 2025)
Camrose Kodiaks	Alberta	AJHL	1 (2001)
Chilliwack Chiefs	British Columbia	BCHL	1 (2018)
Cobourg Cougars	Ontario	OJHL	1 (2017)
Collingwood Blues	Ontario	OJHL	1 (2024)
Fort McMurray Oil Barons	Alberta	AJHL	1 (2000)
Halifax Oland Exports	Nova Scotia	MJAHL	1 (2002)
Kelowna Spartans	British Columbia	BCHL	1 (1993)
North York Rangers	Ontario	OPJHL	1 (1983)
Notre Dame Hounds	Saskatchewan	SJHL	1 (1988)
Olds Grizzlys	Alberta	AJHL	1 (1994)
Orillia Travelways	Ontario	OPJHL	1 (1985)
Pembroke Lumber Kings	Ontario	CCHL	1 (2011)
Richmond Sockeyes	British Columbia	BCJHL	1 (1987)
Rockland Nationals	Ontario	CJHL	1 (1976)
Selkirk Steelers	Manitoba	MJHL	1 (1974)
South Surrey Eagles	British Columbia	BCHL	1 (1998)
Spruce Grove Mets	Alberta	AJHL	1 (1975)
Summerside Western Capitals	Prince Edward Island	MJAHL	1 (1997)
West Kelowna Warriors	British Columbia	BCHL	1 (2016)
Yorkton Terriers	Saskatchewan	SJHL	1 (2014)
Niverville Nighthawks	Manitoba	MJHL	1 (2026)

== Roland Mercier Trophy ==
The Roland Mercier Trophy is awarded to the Most Valuable Player of the Centennial Cup tournament.

- 1975 Ron Lecuyer — Spruce Grove Mets (AJHL)
- 1976 Gerry Leroux — Rockland Nationals (CJHL)
- 1977 Barry Archibald — Prince Albert Raiders (SJHL)
- 1978 Terry Cullen — Guelph Platers (OPJHL)
- 1979 Dunston Carroll — Sherwood-Parkdale Metros (IJHL)
- 1980 Brent Sutter — Red Deer Rustlers (AJHL)
- 1981 James Patrick — Prince Albert Raiders (SJHL)
- 1982 Carl Van Camp — Prince Albert Raiders (SJHL)
- 1983 Dennis McCarroll — North York Rangers (OJHL)
- 1984 Ron Amyotte — Weyburn Red Wings (SJHL)
- 1985 Adam Lewis — Orillia Travelways (OJHL)
- 1986 Kevan Melrose — Penticton Knights (BCJHL)
- 1987 Frank Romeo — Richmond Sockeyes (BCJHL)
- 1988 Rod Brind'Amour — Notre Dame Hounds (SJHL)
- 1989 Todd Henderson — Thunder Bay Flyers (USHL)
- 1990 Marc Alain Duchaine — Longueuil Collège Français (QPJHL)
- 1991 Andrew Backen — Thunder Bay Flyers (USHL)
- 1992 Scott Longstaff — Vernon Lakers (BCHL)
- 1993 Steffon Walby — Kelowna Packers (BCHL)
- 1994 Tyler Graham — Olds Grizzlys (AJHL)
- 1995 Mitch Grant — Winnipeg South Blues (MJHL)
- 1996 Serge Bourgeois — Moncton Beavers (MJAHL)
- 1997 Matt Hartigan – Weyburn Red Wings (SJHL)
- 1998 Peter Wishloff — South Surrey Eagles (BCHL)
- 1999 Dennis Bassett — Yorkton Terriers (SJHL)
- 2000 Serge Dube — Rayside-Balfour Sabrecats (NOJHL)
- 2001 Darrell Stoddard — Camrose Kodiaks (AJHL)
- 2002 Jeff Tambellini — Chilliwack Chiefs (BCHL)
- 2003 Craig Olynick — Humboldt Broncos (SJHL)
- 2004 Kevin Dziaduck — Kindersley Klippers (SJHL)
- 2005 Travis Friedley — Camrose Kodiaks (AJHL)
- 2006 David Wilson — Streetsville Derbys (OPJHL)
- 2007 Daniel Michalsky — Aurora Tigers (OPJHL)
- 2008 Darcy Findlay — Cornwall Colts (CJHL)
- 2009 Kyle Bigos — Vernon Vipers (BCHL)
- 2010 Shane Luke — Dauphin Kings (MJHL)
- 2011 Dalyn Flette — Camrose Kodiaks (AJHL)
- 2012 John Kleinhans — Soo Thunderbirds (NOJHL)
- 2013 Cam Maclise — Brooks Bandits (AJHL)
- 2014 Mike Stiliadis — Dauphin Kings (MJHL)
- 2015 Brad Bowles — Portage Terriers (MJHL)
- 2016 Cale Makar — Brooks Bandits (AJHL)
- 2017 Cale Makar — Brooks Bandits (AJHL)
- 2018 Will Calverley — Chilliwack Chiefs (BCHL)
- 2019 Francis Boisvert — Ottawa Jr. Senators (CCHL)
- 2022 Carson Cherepak — Dauphin Kings (MJHL)
- 2023 Aiden Fink — Brooks Bandits (AJHL)
- 2024 Julien Gervais — Calgary Canucks (AJHL)
- 2025 Anthony Hall – Rockland Nationals (CCHL)

== Game scoring records ==
- Most Goals by Both Teams:

- Notre Dame Hounds 9 – Thunder Bay Flyers 7 (1988 Centennial Cup) (16)
- Vernon Lakers 11 – Nipawin Hawks 5 (1990 Centennial Cup) (16)
- Halifax Oland Exports 9 – Ottawa Jr. Senators 7 (2002 Royal Bank Cup) (16)

- Fewest Goals by Both Teams:

- Selkirk Steelers 1 – Smiths Falls Bears 0 OT (1974 Centennial Cup) (1)
- Wellington Dukes 1 – Charlottetown Abbies 0 OT (2003 Royal Bank Cup) (1)
- Humboldt Broncos 1 – Camrose Kodiaks 0 (2008 Royal Bank Cup) (1)
- Collingwood Blues 1 - Melfort Mustangs 0 (2025 Centennial Cup) (1)

- Most Goals by Single Team:

- Orillia Travelways 11 – Aurora Tigers 3 (1985 Centennial Cup) (11)
- Vernon Lakers 11 – Nipawin Hawks 5 (1990 Centennial Cup) (11)
- Olds Grizzlys 11 – Chateauguay Elites 3 (1994 Centennial Cup) (11)
- Melfort Mustangs 11 – Vernon Vipers 3 (1996 Royal Bank Cup) (11)
- Brockville Braves 11 – Oakville Blades 2 (2010 Royal Bank Cup) (11)

- Largest Spread in a Game:

- New Westminster Royals 9 – Amherst Ramblers 0 (1990 Centennial Cup) (9)
- Thunder Bay Flyers 10 – Winkler Flyers 1 (1992 Centennial Cup) (9)
- Olds Grizzlys 10 – Antigonish Bulldogs 1 (1994 Centennial Cup) (9)
- Brockville Braves 11 – Oakville Blades 2 (2010 Royal Bank Cup) (9)

- Biggest Shutout Victory:

- New Westminster Royals 9 – Amherst Ramblers 0 (1990 Centennial Cup)

- Longest Overtime Game:

- Prince George Spruce Kings 3 – Camrose Kodiaks 2 5OT (146:01 Mins total) (2007 Royal Bank Cup)
