= Greg Johnson (ice hockey) =

Canadian ice hockey player (1971–2019)

- Born: March 16, 1971 Thunder Bay, Ontario, Canada
- Died: July 7, 2019 (aged 48) Rochester, Michigan, U.S.
- Height: 5 ft 10 in (178 cm)
- Weight: 194 lb (88 kg; 13 st 12 lb)
- Position: Centre
- Shot: Left
- Played for: Detroit Red Wings; Pittsburgh Penguins; Chicago Blackhawks; Nashville Predators
- National team: Canada
- NHL draft: 33rd overall, 1989; Philadelphia Flyers
- Playing career: 1994–2006
Medal record
Representing Canada
Ice hockey
Olympic Games
Silver medal – second place	1994 Lillehammer
World Junior Championships
Gold medal – first place	1991 Saskatchewan

Gregory James Johnson (March 16, 1971 – July 7, 2019) was a Canadian professional ice hockey player in the National Hockey League with the Detroit Red Wings, Pittsburgh Penguins, Chicago Blackhawks, and Nashville Predators.

In over 700 career NHL games, Johnson earned 350 points from 134 goals and 216 assists. His best season was in 1998–99 where he achieved 16 goals and 34 assists.

== Playing career ==
=== Amateur ===
Born in Thunder Bay, Ontario, Johnson recorded 96 points in 47 games for the local Thunder Bay Flyers of the USHL in 1988–89.

Johnson played four years at the University of North Dakota where he led the WCHA in assists twice and was placed on the conference First All-Star Team three straight years from 1991 to 1993. He was also placed on the NCAA West First All-American Team in 1991 and 1993 and the Second Team in 1992.

=== Professional ===
Johnson was drafted by the Philadelphia Flyers as the 33rd pick in the second round of the 1989 NHL entry draft, but never played for the organization. On June 20, 1993, he was traded from the Flyers with future considerations to the Detroit Red Wings for Jim Cummins and a fourth round pick in the 1993 NHL entry draft. Red Wings head coach and general manager Bryan Murray specifically targeted Johnson as a skilled center whom the Wings could develop.

Johnson spent parts of four seasons with the Red Wings from 1993 to 1997. On January 27, 1997, Johnson was traded by the Red Wings to the Pittsburgh Penguins for winger Tomas Sandstrom. The Wings, who were looking to add a more physical element and had depth down the middle, traded from a position of strength by sending the skilled center for the rugged veteran forward. The move paid off for the Wings, as they went on to win the 1996-97 Stanley Cup.

Johnson played the rest of the 1996–97 season and part of the 1997–98 season with the Penguins before being traded to the Blackhawks for Tuomas Gronman on October 22, 1997.

Johnson was the 23rd pick of the 1998 NHL Expansion Draft by the Predators from the Blackhawks. He would go on to spend the final seven years of his career with the team. Johnson was the second captain in Nashville Predators history, and served in that capacity from 2002 until 2006. He had previously served as an alternate captain from 1999 to 2002.

Johnson became part of an anomaly during the 2005–06 season when he was credited with scoring a goal before the start of a game against the Detroit Red Wings. On November 21, 2005, he scored a goal during the first period of a game that was eventually postponed after Red Wings defender Jiri Fischer suffered a cardiac arrest. The game was replayed on January 23, 2006, and, while the full game was replayed, Johnson's goal was allowed to stand, thus giving Nashville a 1–0 lead before the opening faceoff.

On August 14, 2006, Johnson signed a one-year contract to rejoin his former team, the Detroit Red Wings. In September 2006, during a routine preseason physical, an EKG test returned abnormal results. Johnson had further testing, and eventually decided to retire before training camp.

== International play ==
Johnson earned a silver medal representing Canada at the 1994 Lillehammer Olympics. He also played for the Canadian National Team in the 1992–93 and 1993–94 seasons.

== Personal life ==
Johnson's brother Ryan was also a professional hockey player, playing for five teams over a fifteen-year NHL career.

On July 7, 2019, Johnson's wife Kristin found him dead in the basement of their Detroit home. No cause of death has been given, but police reports concluded that it was suicide by firearm. Johnson was 48 and survived by his wife and their two daughters.

On July 10, 2024, five years after his death, it was announced Johnson was posthumously diagnosed with chronic traumatic encephalopathy (CTE).

== Career statistics ==
=== Regular season and playoffs ===
			Regular season					Playoffs
Season	Team	League	GP	G	A	Pts	PIM	GP	G	A	Pts	PIM
1988–89	Thunder Bay Flyers	USHL	47	32	64	96	4	12	5	13	18	0
1989–90	University of North Dakota	WCHA	44	17	38	55	11	—	—	—	—	—
1990–91	University of North Dakota	WCHA	38	18	61	79	6	—	—	—	—	—
1991–92	University of North Dakota	WCHA	39	20	54	74	8	—	—	—	—	—
1992–93	University of North Dakota	WCHA	34	19	45	64	18	—	—	—	—	—
1992–93	Canada	Intl	23	6	14	20	2	—	—	—	—	—
1993–94	Canada	Intl	14	2	9	11	4	—	—	—	—	—
1993–94	Adirondack Red Wings	AHL	3	2	4	6	0	4	0	4	4	2
1993–94	Detroit Red Wings	NHL	52	6	11	17	22	7	2	2	4	2
1994–95	Detroit Red Wings	NHL	22	3	5	8	14	1	0	0	0	0
1995–96	Detroit Red Wings	NHL	60	18	22	40	30	13	3	1	4	8
1996–97	Detroit Red Wings	NHL	43	6	10	16	12	—	—	—	—	—
1996–97	Pittsburgh Penguins	NHL	32	7	9	16	14	5	1	0	1	2
1997–98	Pittsburgh Penguins	NHL	5	1	0	1	2	—	—	—	—	—
1997–98	Chicago Blackhawks	NHL	69	11	22	33	38	—	—	—	—	—
1998–99	Nashville Predators	NHL	68	16	34	50	24	—	—	—	—	—
1999–2000	Nashville Predators	NHL	82	11	33	44	40	—	—	—	—	—
2000–01	Nashville Predators	NHL	82	15	17	32	46	—	—	—	—	—
2001–02	Nashville Predators	NHL	82	18	26	44	38	—	—	—	—	—
2002–03	Nashville Predators	NHL	38	8	9	17	22	—	—	—	—	—
2003–04	Nashville Predators	NHL	82	14	18	32	33	6	1	2	3	0
2005–06	Nashville Predators	NHL	68	11	8	19	10	5	0	1	1	2
NHL totals			785	145	224	369	345	37	7	6	13	14

=== International ===
Year	Team	Event	Result	GP	G	A	Pts	PIM
1991	Canada	WJC	1st place, gold medalist(s)	7	4	2	6	0
1993	Canada	WC	4th	8	1	2	3	2
1994	Canada	OG	2nd place, silver medalist(s)	8	0	3	3	0
Junior totals				7	4	2	6	0
Senior totals				16	1	5	6	2

== Awards and honours ==
Award	Year
USHL
Forward of the Year	1989
Clark Cup (Thunder Bay Flyers)	1989
College
WCHA All-Tournament Team	1990, 1991
All-WCHA First Team	1990–91
AHCA West First-Team All-American	1990–91
All-WCHA First Team	1991–92
AHCA West Second-Team All-American	1991–92
All-WCHA First Team	1992–93
AHCA West First-Team All-American	1992–93

Sporting positions
Preceded by Tom Fitzgerald	Nashville Predators captain 2002–2006	Succeeded by Kimmo Timonen
