= 2018 Dudley Hewitt Cup =

Central Region Jr A Championship

Tournament details
- Venue: Dryden Memorial Arena in Dryden, Ontario
- Host team: Dryden Ice Dogs

Final positions
- Champions: Wellington Dukes
- Runners-up: Dryden Ice Dogs

Tournament statistics
- Games played: 8

The 2018 Dudley Hewitt Cup was the 47th Central Canadian Jr A Ice Hockey Championship for the Canadian Junior Hockey League. The winner of the 2018 Dudley Hewitt Cup represented the central region in the 2018 Royal Bank Cup in Chilliwack, BC.

== Teams ==
- Dryden Ice Dogs (SIJHL Champions)

Regular Season: 40-8-6-2 (1st in SIJHL)
Playoffs: Defeated Fort Frances Lakers 4-1, Defeated Thunder Bay North Stars 4-2 to win the league.

- Thunder Bay North Stars (SIJHL Runner-up)

Regular Season: 38-13-4-1 (3rd in SIJHL)
Playoffs: Defeated Minnesota Iron Rangers 3-0, Defeated Thief River Falls Norskies 4-1, Lost to Dryden Ice Dogs 2-4.

- Wellington Dukes (OJHL Champions)

Regular Season: 33-13-3-5 (1st in OJHL East Division)
Playoffs: Defeated Pickering Panthers 4-3, Defeated Newmarket Hurricanes 4-3, Defeated Aurora Tigers 4-1, Defeated Georgetown Raiders 4-2 to win the league.

- Cochrane Crunch (NOJHL Champions)

Regular Season: 36-17-2-1 (2nd in NOJHL East Division)
Playoffs: Defeated Kirkland Lake Gold Miners 4-1, Defeated Timmins Rock 4-1, Defeated Rayside-Balfour Canadians 4-2 to win the league.

== Round Robin ==
DHC Round Robin
Rank	Team	League	W-OTW-L-OTL	GF	GA	Pts.
1	Dryden Ice Dogs	(Host) SIJHL	2-0-1-0	8	3	6
2	Wellington Dukes	OJHL	2-0-1-0	11	8	6
3	Thunder Bay North Stars	SIJHL	2-0-1-0	7	5	6
4	Cochrane Crunch	NOJHL	0-0-3-0	3	13	0

Tie Breaker: Head-to-Head, then 3-way +/-.

=== Results ===
Round Robin results
Game	Away team	Score	Home team	Score	Notes
1	Cochrane	0	Thunder Bay	4	Final
2	Wellington	1	Dryden	4	Final
3	Wellington	4	Thunder Bay	1	Final
4	Dryden	3	Cochrane	0	Final
5	Cochrane	3	Wellington	6	Final
6	Thunder Bay	2	Dryden	1	Final

== Semifinals and final ==
Championship Round
Game	Away team	Score	Home team	Score	Notes
Friday May 4
Semi-final	Thunder Bay	3	Wellington	6	-
Saturday May 5
Final	Wellington	7	Dryden	4	
