= Dudley Hewitt Cup =

Canadian ice hockey trophy

- Sport: Ice hockey
- League: OJHL; NOJHL; SIJHL
- Awarded for: Regional championship
- Country: Canada

History
- First award: 1971
- Final award: 2019
- Most wins: Pembroke Lumber Kings (5); Thunder Bay Flyers (5)
- Most recent: Oakville Blades (2019)

The Dudley Hewitt Cup (also known as the Dudley Hewitt Memorial Trophy) was awarded annually from 1971–2019 to the championship Junior 'A' ice hockey team for the Central/East region of Canada. That region initially extended east from Ontario to The Maritimes. Later, the scope was limited to teams from the Ontario Junior Hockey League (OJHL), Northern Ontario Junior Hockey League (NOJHL) and Superior International Junior Hockey League (SIJHL). The winners of the Dudley Hewitt Cup went on to compete for the national championship Centennial Cup.

It was named after George Dudley and W. A. Hewitt, who served as administrators for the Ontario Hockey Association and are inductees of the Hockey Hall of Fame.

== History ==
The Dudley Hewitt Memorial Trophy was first awarded in 1971 to the Charlottetown Islanders of the Maritime Junior A Hockey League (1968–1971) after they defeated the Detroit Jr. Red Wings (SOJHL) 4 games to 2. The Pembroke Lumber Kings of the CJHL and the Thunder Bay Flyers of the United States Hockey League tied for the most wins with four each.

The 2002 Dudley-Hewitt Cup marked a new chapter in Ontario hockey history. Since the mid-1990s, the OPJHL and NOJHL had squared off in a head-to-head series to determine the Central Canadian seed in the Royal Bank Cup. In 2001, a new Thunder Bay-area league, called the Superior International Junior Hockey League, was founded. Late in the 2001–02 season the CJAHL informed all three leagues that instead of a series, the Dudley would be contested through a round-robin format. Initially, both the OPJHL and NOJHL threatened to boycott the DHC. The CJAHL announced that if the OPJHL and NOJHL did not send a champion, the SIJHL champion would move on by default to the national championship. The OPJHL did not budge, but the NOJHL gave in and in January announced that their champion would play the SIJHL champion for the DHC in a best-of-three series.

In 2013 the Minnesota Wilderness of the SIJHL became the first US-based champions after defeating the St. Michael's Buzzers of the OJHL 4:3 in overtime.

The 2014 Dudley Hewitt Cup saw its fourth all-OJHL Dudley-Hewitt Cup final between the Wellington Dukes and the Toronto Lakeshore Patriots. Toronto won 2–1 advancing to the 2014 Royal Bank Cup in Vernon, British Columbia.

The 2015 Dudley Hewitt Cup was won by the Soo Thunderbirds of the NOJHL.

The Trenton Golden Hawks of the OJHL won their first Dudley Hewitt championship in 2016 and their second in 2017 while hosting.

Dryden, Ontario, and the Dryden Ice Dogs of the Superior International Junior Hockey League were hosts of the 2018 Dudley Hewitt Cup.

The 2019 Dudley Hewitt Cup was hosted in Cochrane, Ontario, of the NOJHL, after the Cochrane Crunch and the Timmins Rock were the only teams to submit bids.

In early January 2019, the Wellington Dukes were awarded the 2020 Dudley-Hewitt Cup tournament, but shortly afterwards, Hockey Canada levied sanctions against the OJHL for trades made after the January 10 deadline. The OJHL was fined $50,000 and were banned from hosting the Dudley-Hewitt Cup and Royal Bank Cup tournaments for a period of five years. The 2020 tournament was then awarded to Fort Frances, Ontario, before it was cancelled entirely due to the COVID-19 pandemic.

== Format ==
The competition included the championship teams from the Ontario Junior Hockey League (OJHL), Northern Ontario Junior Hockey League (NOJHL) and Superior International Junior Hockey League (SIJHL), and a preselected host team. The first phase of the tournament was a round-robin to determine seeding, followed by a semifinal elimination round played between the second and third seeds, followed by a final best-of-3 elimination round played between the first-place team and the winner of the semifinal. The winners of the Dudley Hewitt Cup went on to compete for the national championship Centennial Cup.

== Champions ==
Dudley Hewitt Cup logo.

Dudley-Hewitt Cup champions
Year	Champions	Runners-up	Result	Host
Eastern Canadian champions
1971	Charlottetown Islanders (MJAHL)	Detroit Jr. Red Wings (SOJHL)	4-2 (best-of 7)
1972	Guelph CMC's (SOJHL)	Charlottetown Islanders (Independent)	4-0 (best-of 7)
1973	Pembroke Lumber Kings (CJHL)	St. Jerome Alouettes (QJAHL)	4-1 (best-of 7)
1974	Smiths Falls Bears (CJHL)	Thunder Bay Hurricanes (TBJHL)	4-3 (best-of 7)
1975	Guelph Biltmore Mad Hatters (SOJHL)	Smiths Falls Bears (CJHL)	4-2 (best-of 7)
1976	Rockland Nationals (CJHL)	Charlottetown Colonels (IJHL)	4-0 (best-of 7)
1977	Pembroke Lumber Kings (CJHL)	Charlottetown Generals (IJHL)	4-0 (best-of 7)
1978	Guelph Platers (OPJHL)	Charlottetown Eagles (IJHL)	4-2 (best-of 7)
Central region champions
1979	Guelph Platers (OPJHL)	Hawkesbury Hawks (CJHL)	4-2 (best-of 7)
1980	North York Rangers (OPJHL)	Joliette Cyclones (QJAHL)	4-2 (best-of 7)
1981	Belleville Bulls (OPJHL)	Gloucester Rangers (CJHL)	4-3 (best-of 7)
1982	Guelph Platers (OJHL)	Pembroke Lumber Kings (CJHL)	4-0 (best-of 7)
1983	North York Rangers (OJHL)	Thunder Bay Kings (TBHL)	4-0 (best-of 7)
1984	Orillia Travelways (OJHL)	Pembroke Lumber Kings (CJHL)	4-0 (best-of 7)
1985	Orillia Travelways (OJHL)	Aurora Tigers (OJHL)	11-3
1986	Orillia Travelways (OJHL)	Brockville Braves (CJHL)	4-3 (best-of 7)
1987	Pembroke Lumber Kings (CJHL)	Nickel Centre Power Trains (NOJHL)	4-1 (best-of 7)
1988	Pembroke Lumber Kings (CJHL)	Thunder Bay Flyers (USHL)	4-0 (best-of 7)
1989	Thunder Bay Flyers (USHL)	Pembroke Lumber Kings (CJHL)	4-0 (best-of 7)
1990	Longueuil Collège Français (QPJHL)	Sudbury Cubs (NOJHL)	4-3 (best-of 7)
1991	Thunder Bay Flyers (USHL)	Sudbury Cubs (NOJHL)	5-1	Hawkesbury, Ontario
1992	Thunder Bay Flyers (USHL)	Kanata Valley Lasers (CJHL)	5-1	Thunder Bay, Ontario
1993	Chateauguay Elites (QPJHL)	Ottawa Senators (CJHL)	9-2	St. Hubert, Quebec
1994	Chateauguay Elites (QPJHL)	Thunder Bay Flyers (USHL)	9-5	Timmins, Ontario
1995	Thunder Bay Flyers (USHL)	Brampton Capitals (OPJHL)	6-4	Thunder Bay, Ontario
1996	Newmarket 87's (OPJHL)	Brampton Capitals (OPJHL)	8-2	Cobourg, Ontario
1997	Rayside-Balfour Sabrecats (NOJHL)	Milton Merchants (OPJHL)	4-1 (best-of 7)
1998	Milton Merchants (OPJHL)	Rayside-Balfour Sabrecats (NOJHL)	4-2 (best-of 7)
1999	Bramalea Blues (OPJHL)	Rayside-Balfour Sabrecats (NOJHL)	4-0 (best-of 7)
2000	Rayside-Balfour Sabrecats (NOJHL)	Brampton Capitals (OPJHL)	4-1 (best-of 7)
2001	Thornhill Rattlers (OPJHL)	Rayside-Balfour Sabrecats (NOJHL)	4-3 (best-of 7)
2002	Rayside-Balfour Sabrecats (NOJHL)	Dryden Ice Dogs (SIJHL)	2-0 (best-of 3)
2003	Wellington Dukes (OPJHL)	North Bay Skyhawks (NOJHL)	4-0	Fort Frances, Ontario
2004	Aurora Tigers (OPJHL)	North Bay Skyhawks (NOJHL)	5-1	North Bay, Ontario
2005	Georgetown Raiders (OPJHL)	St. Michael's Buzzers (OPJHL)	3-1	Georgetown, Ontario
2006	Fort William North Stars (SIJHL)	Sudbury Jr. Wolves (NOJHL)	7-6 (OT)	Thunder Bay, Ontario
2007	Aurora Tigers (OPJHL)	Schreiber Diesels (SIJHL)	10-0	Iroquois Falls, Ontario
2008	Oakville Blades (OPJHL)	Newmarket Hurricanes (OPJHL)	6-3	Newmarket, Ontario
2009	Kingston Voyageurs (OJHL)	Fort William North Stars (SIJHL)	4-1	Schreiber, Ontario
2010	Oakville Blades (OJAHL)	Fort William North Stars (SIJHL)	2-1	Sault Ste. Marie, Ontario
2011	Wellington Dukes (OJHL)	Huntsville Otters (OJHL)	5-3	Huntsville, Ontario
2012	Soo Thunderbirds (NOJHL)	Stouffville Spirit (OJHL)	5-3	Thunder Bay, Ontario
2013	Minnesota Wilderness (SIJHL)	St. Michael's Buzzers (OJHL)	4-3 (OT)	North Bay, Ontario
2014	Toronto Lakeshore Patriots (OJHL)	Wellington Dukes (OJHL)	2-1	Wellington, Ontario
2015	Soo Thunderbirds (NOJHL)	Fort Frances Lakers (SIJHL)	3-2	Fort Frances, Ontario
2016	Trenton Golden Hawks (OJHL)	Soo Thunderbirds (NOJHL)	4-0	Kirkland Lake, Ontario
2017	Trenton Golden Hawks (OJHL)	Georgetown Raiders (OJHL)	2-1	Trenton, Ontario
2018	Wellington Dukes (OJHL)	Dryden Ice Dogs (SIJHL)	7-4	Dryden, Ontario
2019	Oakville Blades (OJHL)	Hearst Lumberjacks (NOJHL)	2-0	Cochrane, Ontario
