= Parent (surname) =

Parent is a surname, and may refer to:

- Alphonse-Marie Parent (1906–1970), Canadian priest, educator and academic administrator
- Antoine Parent (1666–1716), French mathematician
- Bernie Parent (1945–2025), Canadian National Hockey League player
- Bob Parent (1923–1987), Canadian-born photographer
- Bob Parent (born 1958), retired ice hockey player
- Clark Parent, Haitian philosopher and politician
- Claude Parent (1923–2016), French architect
- Dan Parent, American comic book artist and writer
- Elaine Parent (1942–2002), Florida-based criminal, known as "The Chameleon Killer"
- Étienne Parent (1802–1874) Canadian journalist and government official
- Gail Parent, American television screenwriter, television producer, and author
- Gilbert Parent, (1935–2009) Canadian Member of Parliament
- Jacqueline Parent, French actress
- Jacques Parent, French Olympic fencer
- Jacques Parent (1862–1918), Canadian politician
- Jason Parent, American politician
- Leslie Parent, American microbiologist and immunologist
- Kevin Parent (b. 1972), Québécois singer-songwriter
- Marc Parent, former director of Montreal Police Service
- Mark Parent (b. 1954), former Canadian politician
- Mark Parent (born 1961), American Major League Baseball player
- Mary Parent (b. 1968), American film producer and former studio executive
- Maury Parent (died 2004), American radio personality
- Mimi Parent (1924–2005), Canadian surrealist
- Octave Parent (1882–1942), French entomologist
- Ryan Parent (b. 1987), Canadian National Hockey League player
- Simon-Napoléon Parent (1855–1920), former premier of Quebec
- Steven Parent, one of five victims of the Tate murders (1969)
