= Gordie Roberts =

American ice hockey player

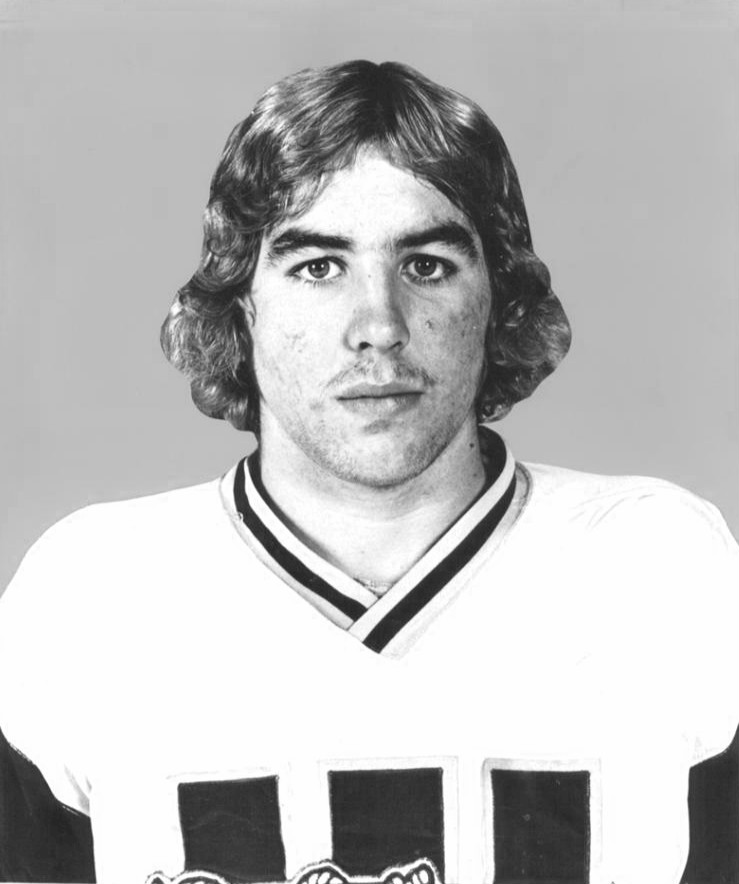
- Roberts with the New England Whalers in 1976
- Born: October 2, 1957 (age 68) Detroit, Michigan, U.S.
- Height: 6 ft 0 in (183 cm)
- Weight: 195 lb (88 kg; 13 st 13 lb)
- Position: Defense
- Shot: Left
- Played for: Hartford Whalers; Minnesota North Stars; Philadelphia Flyers; St. Louis Blues; Pittsburgh Penguins; Boston Bruins
- National team: United States
- NHL draft: 54th overall, 1977; Montreal Canadiens
- Playing career: 1975–1996

Gordon Dennis Roberts (born October 2, 1957) is an American former professional ice hockey defenseman who played 1,097 NHL regular season games from 1979 to 1994. He was a two-time Stanley Cup winner with the Pittsburgh Penguins. He is an honoured member of the United States Hockey Hall of Fame.

His brother Doug Roberts is also a former NHL player.

== Amateur career ==
Roberts was named after Detroit Red Wings star Gordie Howe, who was eventually Roberts' teammate in Hartford, and grew up playing junior hockey in the Southern Ontario Junior Hockey League for the Detroit Jr. Red Wings.

== Professional career ==
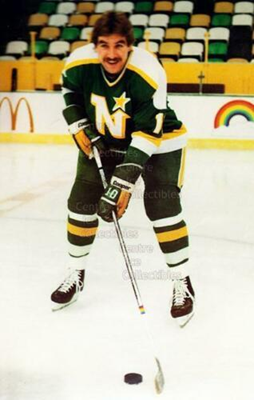
1981 photo of Roberts for Minnesota North Stars

Roberts was drafted in the third round, 54th overall by the Montreal Canadiens in the 1977 NHL amateur draft. His professional career started in 1975 when he was signed as a 17-year-old underage junior by the WHA New England Whalers. He represented the Whalers in the 1977 and 1978 WHA All-Star Game and was still with New England when the NHL and WHA merged in 1979.

In 1980, the Whalers traded Roberts to the Minnesota North Stars for Mike Fidler. He remained a North Star for eight seasons before moving to the Philadelphia Flyers in 1988, who promptly traded him to the St. Louis Blues after only 11 games. During this time, Roberts also played for Team USA in the 1984 Canada Cup as well as the 1982 and 1987 Ice Hockey World Championship tournaments.

Roberts won two Stanley Cups with the Pittsburgh Penguins in 1991 and 1992 and became the first American player to appear in 1,000 NHL games, in 1992. He played for the Boston Bruins during his final two years in the NHL, then played two more seasons in the International Hockey League before finally retiring at age 39 in 1996 -- the last of Gordie Howe's old NHL teammates still on the ice. (Incredibly, Howe himself still wasn't done as a player, making a cameo appearance with the IHL's Detroit Vipers in 1997, at the age of 69.)

== Post-playing career ==
Roberts served as the player/coach of the 1994–95 International Hockey League Chicago Wolves as well as the assistant coach of the Phoenix Coyotes for the 1998 and 1999 seasons. In recent years, he has worked as a pro scout for the Montreal Canadiens, specializing in Western Canada and the Western U.S. In 2012, Roberts became the head coach for the Elk River High School boys hockey team in Elk River, Minnesota. For the 2017-2018 season, he was an assistant coach for the Maple Grove Senior High School Crimson boys hockey team.

== Awards and achievements ==
- Inducted into the United States Hockey Hall of Fame in 1999.
- Played in 1977 and 1978 WHA All-Star Game
- 2- Time Stanley Cup champion (1991, 1992)

== Career statistics ==
=== Regular season and playoffs ===
			Regular season					Playoffs
Season	Team	League	GP	G	A	Pts	PIM	GP	G	A	Pts	PIM
1973–74	Detroit Jr. Red Wings	SOJHL	70	25	55	80	340	—	—	—	—	—
1974–75	Victoria Cougars	WCHL	53	19	45	64	145	12	1	9	10	42
1975–76	New England Whalers	WHA	77	3	19	22	102	17	2	9	11	36
1976–77	New England Whalers	WHA	77	13	33	46	169	5	2	2	4	4
1977–78	New England Whalers	WHA	78	15	46	61	118	14	0	5	5	29
1978–79	New England Whalers	WHA	79	11	46	57	113	10	0	4	4	10
1979–80	Hartford Whalers	NHL	80	8	28	36	89	3	1	1	2	2
1980–81	Hartford Whalers	NHL	27	2	11	13	81	—	—	—	—	—
1980–81	Minnesota North Stars	NHL	50	6	31	37	94	19	1	5	6	17
1981–82	Minnesota North Stars	NHL	79	4	30	34	119	4	0	3	3	27
1982–83	Minnesota North Stars	NHL	80	3	41	44	103	9	1	5	6	14
1983–84	Minnesota North Stars	NHL	77	8	45	53	132	15	3	7	10	23
1984–85	Minnesota North Stars	NHL	78	6	36	42	112	9	1	6	7	6
1985–86	Minnesota North Stars	NHL	76	2	21	23	101	5	0	4	4	8
1986–87	Minnesota North Stars	NHL	67	3	10	13	86	—	—	—	—	—
1987–88	Minnesota North Stars	NHL	48	1	10	11	103	—	—	—	—	—
1987–88	Philadelphia Flyers	NHL	11	1	2	3	15	—	—	—	—	—
1987–88	St. Louis Blues	NHL	11	1	3	4	25	10	1	2	3	33
1988–89	St. Louis Blues	NHL	77	2	24	26	90	10	1	7	8	8
1989–90	St. Louis Blues	NHL	75	3	14	17	140	10	0	2	2	26
1990–91	St. Louis Blues	NHL	3	0	1	1	8	—	—	—	—	—
1990–91	Peoria Rivermen	IHL	6	0	8	8	4	—	—	—	—	—
1990–91	Pittsburgh Penguins	NHL	61	3	12	15	70	24	1	2	3	63
1991–92	Pittsburgh Penguins	NHL	73	2	22	24	87	19	0	2	2	32
1992–93	Boston Bruins	NHL	65	5	12	17	105	4	0	0	0	6
1993–94	Boston Bruins	NHL	59	1	6	7	40	12	0	1	1	8
1994–95	Chicago Wolves	IHL	68	6	22	28	80	3	0	0	0	4
1995–96	Minnesota Moose	IHL	37	1	12	13	44	—	—	—	—	—
WHA totals			311	42	144	186	502	46	4	20	24	79
NHL totals			1,097	61	359	420	1,582	153	10	47	57	273

=== International ===
Year	Team	Event	GP	G	A	Pts	PIM
1982	United States	WC	7	3	4	7	12
1984	United States	CC	6	1	0	1	6
1987	United States	WC	10	0	1	1	33
Senior totals			23	4	5	9	51

== See also ==
- List of NHL players with 1,000 games played
