= Windsor Spitfires =

Ontario Hockey League team in Windsor

- City: Windsor, Ontario
- League: Ontario Hockey League
- Conference: Western
- Division: West
- Founded: 1971–72 (Tier II Junior A); 1975–76 (Tier I Junior A)
- Home arena: WFCU Centre
- Colours: Blue, white, red
- Owners: John Savage, Stephen Savage, Brian Schwab
- General manager: Bill Bowler
- Head coach: Greg Walters
- Affiliates: LaSalle Vipers (GOJHL)
- Website: windsorspitfires.com

Championships
- Playoff championships: OHL Champions: 1988, 2009, 2010; Memorial Cup: 2009, 2010, 2017; SOJHL Champions: 1974

Current uniform

The Windsor Spitfires are a Canadian junior ice hockey team in the Ontario Hockey League (OHL). The team is based in Windsor, Ontario, Canada. Founded in 1971, the franchise was promoted to the Ontario Major Junior Hockey League for the 1975–76 season. An unrelated Windsor Spitfires team, founded in 1946, moved to become the Hamilton Tiger Cubs in 1953, and later became the Erie Otters in 1996.

== History ==
The original Spitfires in the Ontario Hockey Association played from 1945 to 1953. The name Spitfires was chosen to honour the 417 Combat Support Squadron, a Royal Canadian Air Force squadron nicknamed "City of Windsor" established during World War II in England (today based at CFB Cold Lake in Alberta), and used the Supermarine Spitfire fighter aircraft. During this period the Spitfires reached the league finals twice, and featured four future Hockey Hall of Fame players. Prior to 1945, local junior hockey was divided up into the six-team Windsor Junior Hockey League. The Spitfires folded in 1953 as hockey interests in Windsor chose to focus their attention on the OHA Senior A Hockey League, which resulted in the founding of the Windsor Bulldogs. Eventually five former Spitfires laced up with the Bulldogs and one, Bobby Brown, won an Allan Cup with the team (1963). The Bulldogs folded in 1964 after one season in the International Hockey League.

=== Tier II Junior A ===
The modern Windsor Spitfires started as a Tier II Junior A team that played in the Southern Ontario Junior A Hockey League from 1971 to 1975. The Spitfires first game as a franchise was in Guelph, Ontario, against the Guelph CMC's on October 1, 1971. The Spitfires lost the game 11–3, with Laurie Gregan scoring the first two goals in team history in the first period. Fifteen-year-old goaltender Larry Verlinde played the entire first game in team history, making 37 saves in the loss. The home game and first victory in team history occurred on October 7, 1971, at the Windsor Arena against the Chatham Maroons, winning 4–2 on the back of future NHL goaltender Eddie Mio who made 49 saves. Dean Sheremeta scored the winning goal.

The Spitfires finished their first season with a record of 21 wins, 32 losses, and 3 ties. Finishing sixth place out of eight teams, the Spitfires drew local rival Chatham Maroons in a best-of-seven league quarter-final. The Maroons, who finished third with 33 wins, 17 losses, and 6 ties, were favoured to win. The Spitfires' first playoff game took place on February 23, 1972, in Chatham, Ontario, for a 3–2 win over the Maroons to take a one-game lead in the series. Goaltender Bryan Rose made 35 saves in the winning effort, while the Spits' first playoff goal and later winning goals were scored by Wolf Hiesl, both in the second period. The Spitfires lost the next four games to the Maroons to end their season.

The 1972–73 season, the Spitfires second season, finished with their first winning record – 30 wins, 21 losses, and 9 ties. Finishing third in a league of seven teams, the Spitfires drew the fourth place Niagara Falls Flyers (28–25–7) in the league quarter-final. The Spits dropped game one 6–4 in Niagara Falls, while in game two the Spits tied the series with a 6–4 win of their own at home. Back in Niagara, the Flyers shellacked the Spitfires 7–2 to take the series lead again. The fourth game was a disaster for the Spitfires, at home they blew a third period deadlock to lose 7–5 and fall behind in the series 3-games-to-1. In game five, the Spitfires needed to make a change. Future IHLer Tony Piroski and partner Jean Pominville had uninspired starts in games three and four and were replaced by third-string goalie, and future NHLer, Rick Heinz. Heinz had spent the season in Junior B with the Spitfires' farm team Windsor Royals and was new to the pressure of Junior A playoff hockey. The gamble paid off, as an inspired Spitfire squad won the game 9-4 while Heinz capped of a 24-save night for the victory. In game six, coach Jerry Serviss returned to his starting goalie, Tony Piroski, in net on the road. Piroski rewarded his coach's confidence with a 5–4, 33-save victory - evening the series at 3 games each. Mark Smith scored the eventual game winner for the Spitfires. Game seven saw the two teams return for a final showdown at the Windsor Arena. The Spitfires would take the game 6–3 in front of a capacity crowd of 5,189 fans. The victory, winning in seven games, was the Spitfires' first ever playoff series victory. Waiting for them, rested for the semi-final, was the first place Guelph Biltmore Mad Hatters (39–13–8). The Biltmores, defending National Champions, made short work of the Spitfires sweeping them in four games.

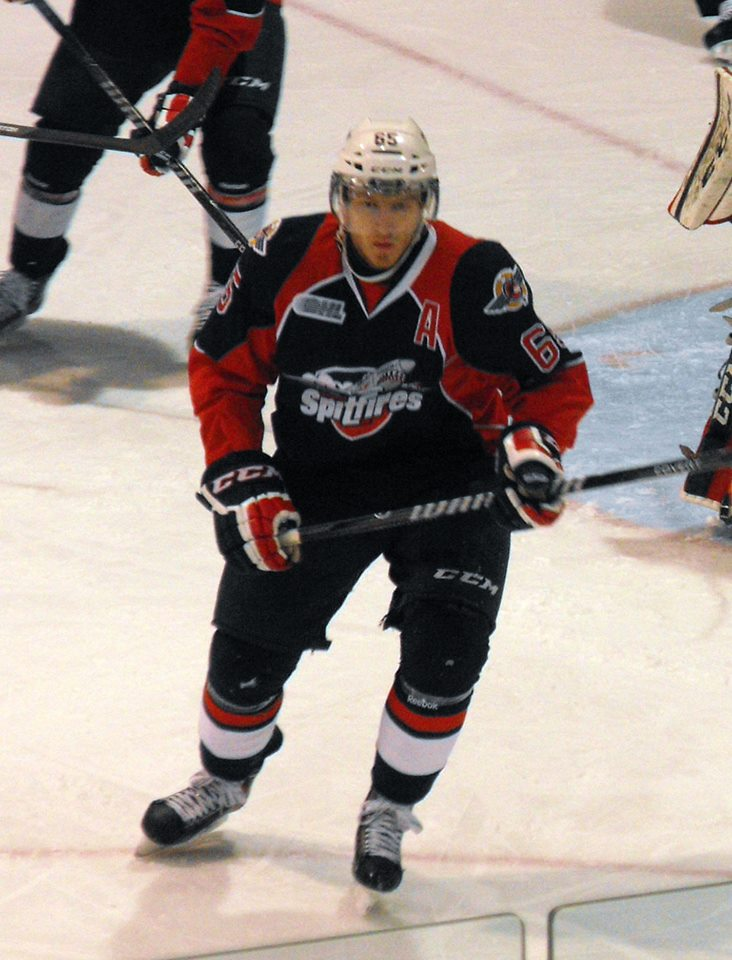
Slater Koekkoek (December 2013)

The 1973–74 season would prove to be the defining moment of the Spitfires stint in Tier II Junior A. Headed by new head coach and general manager Wayne Maxner, the Spitfires won the Southern Ontario Junior A regular season title with a record of 39 wins, 15 losses, and 8 ties. Their record would put them four points ahead of the second place Welland Sabres and automatically give them a berth into the league playoff semi-finals. Scott Miller would win the SOJHL scoring title with 73 goals and 125 points over the course of the season. The Spitfires semi-final opponent was their cross-river rival Detroit Jr. Red Wings. The Red Wings had finished the season in fifth out of eight teams (31–25–6). The semi-final opened up at the Windsor Arena with a 7–1 win for the Spitfires. They were at the Detroit Olympia for game two, another romp for Windsor as they won 8–0. Back in Windsor, the Spitfires won game three 9–2. At the Olympia for game four, the Red Wings attempted to stage some resistance, but the Spitfires were too much, winning 7–5. The four-game sweep of the Red Wings allowed Windsor to rest up for the winner of the Chatham Maroons and Welland Sabres, a series just starting. On March 16, 1974, the Spitfires engaged long time foe Chatham Maroons at the Windsor Arena in the first game of the SOJHL Final. The Maroons fell in that first game 6–1, but rebounded the next night in Chatham with a 5–2 victory of their own. On March 18, goalie Dennis Thorpe's 40 save performance and third period game winner by Gary Armstrong gave the Spitfires a 2–1 home victory and a lead in the series. The Spitfires took game four in Chatham with a 6–4 win. The next night, March 21, the Spitfires defeated the Maroons in Windsor 4–3 to clinch the SOJHL playoff championship. Gary Armstrong would score yet another winning goal in the series. Before a crowd of 5,117 fans, team captain Hugh Mitchell hoisted the Jack Oakes Memorial Trophy to celebrate their playoff victory. The Spitfires were now in the hunt for the 1974 Centennial Cup, the National Championship of Tier II Junior A hockey. The first team in their way, in the Dudley Hewitt Cup Eastern Canada playdowns was the Wexford Raiders of the Ontario Provincial Junior A Hockey League. Also on the line was the Ontario Hockey Association Junior A championship, the Buckland Cup. The Spitfires took game one in Rexdale with a 4–2 victory. Back in Windsor the next night, the Spitfires seemed to have the series in control with a 5–2 win. The Raiders had other things in mind, winning at home in game three 6–2 and then taking it to Windsor in their own arena 4–1 to tie the series. Back in Rexdale, the Raiders crushed the Spitfires with an 8–2 victory. With their back against the wall, the Spits had to win at home to force game seven. A 7–5 victory for the Spitfires turned this into a series for the ages. On April 6, 1974, the Spitfires season came to an end, as the Wexford Raiders took a 6–3 victory at home to advance to the next round of national playdowns. Scott Miller would be named the team's most valuable player.

The Windsor Spitfires applied for expansion to the OMJHL (later known as the OHL) during their 1974 playoff run, but were rejected due to the "unacceptability of Windsor Arena as a major A facility." Their farm team, the Windsor Royals Junior B team of the Great Lakes Junior Hockey League put in a rival bid but were also rejected due to lack of an acceptable arena.

In 1974–75, Jim Butcher coached the Spits to a second straight regular season title with a record of 40 wins, 15 losses, and 5 ties, 11 points ahead of the second place Welland Sabres (30–16–14). John Tavella won the league scoring title with 54 goals and 117 points and goaltender Floyd St. Cyr led the league with the fewest goals against. The Spitfires' first opponent in the playoff semi-final was the last place Detroit Jr. Red Wings (15–38–9). At home, the Spits took game one 11–2. Back at the Detroit Olympia, the Spits won 8–2. Again in Windsor, the Spits took game three 10–1. The Spits had the chance to clinch in game four, but the Red Wings refused to let their season end in front of their Detroit faithful winning 5–3. Game five, in Windsor, Ian Campbell would score a late third period tally to break a 2–2 deadlock and send the Spitfires to the league finals. The fourth place Guelph Bilmores (23–31–6) stood in the way of the Spitfires. The Biltmores had upset the second place Welland Sabres in the league quarter-final in five games and the third place Chatham Maroons 8-points-to-6 (3 wins, 2 losses, 2 ties) and were looking to shock the Spitfires too. The Biltmores had caused trouble for the Spitfires all season as their head-to-head record was 5 wins each and 2 ties in 12 matches. After a week layoff, the Spitfires were up against a hot opponent and were missing scoring champion John Tavella to a three-games suspension for butt-ending against Detroit. The Spits dropped the first game, at home, 6–5 after giving up a late 2-on-1 odd-man rush late in the third period. The next night, in Guelph, the Spitfires led 6–1 in the first and 8–4 in the second to blow the lead in the third and finish with a 9–9 overtime tie. The Spitfires tied up the series in game three with a 4–2 win in Windsor. In Guelph for game four, the Spitfires blew a first period 3–0 lead to lose 6–4. Game five saw the Spitfires tie the series at five points a piece with an 8–4 win at home. Guelph again gained the advantage in game six with a 6–4 win at home. In a last gasp for air, the Spitfires fought to win a 6–4 decision in Windsor to tie the series at 7 points each and force a final eighth game - winner take all. The eighth game proved to be the Spitfires' last game of Tier II Junior A, as they traveled to Guelph and blew a 3–0 lead to lose the game (6–5) and the series (9-points-to-7) to end their four-year trek in the Southern Ontario Junior A Hockey League.

The Spitfires were granted entry into the OMJHL (later known as the OHL) as an expansion franchise for the 1975–76 OMJHL season in February 1975. The league's board of governors unanimously accepted the Spitfires despite their arena's surface being smaller than Major Junior A standards. The Spitfires' had pumped $200,000 into the arena over the past two years, so the league overlooked the surface size despite taking issue with it in their 1974 rejection of the Spitfires' expansion bid.

=== Major Junior ===
On September 25, 1975, Major Junior hockey returned to the Windsor Arena for the first time in twenty-two years. In front of 4,335 fans, the Windsor Spitfires hosted the Oshawa Generals. The game would be an eye-opener for the Spitfires, as they were defeated 10–1 by the Generals. Wayne Mills started in net for the Spits, but would be later relieved by back-up Bob Parent when the Generals made it 7–0 at 11:29 of the second period. The two goaltenders combined for 30 saves, as the Spits were outshot 40–23. Rolly Hedges scored the first Major Junior goal in team history at 18:48 of the second period.

On October 2, 1975, the Spitfires would tally their first ever Major Junior win. At home, the Spits were hosting the Sudbury Wolves. Despite being outshot 60–34, the Spitfires overcame a six-goal deficit to defeat the Wolves 11–10. After trailing 7–1 only 2:49 into the second period, the Spitfires were able to chip the lead down to 9–7 by the second intermission. Charlie Skjodt scored to make it 9–9 to complete the comeback, just to have the Wolves score with 6:33 to go in the game to make it 10–9. Charles Bosnyak, a member of the 1974–75 Tier II Spitfires, scored 32 seconds later to make it 10–10 and captain Mark Perras scored with 43 seconds remaining to win the Spits' first ever Major Junior game. Bob Parent would make 50 saves to cap off the historic victory.

The "Spits" as they are commonly known, won their first Emms division title in 1980 and reached the OHL finals, but lost to the Peterborough Petes. Ernie Godden set an all-time OHL record in 1980–81 scoring 87 goals. In 1984 Peter Karmanos, the founder and CEO of Compuware, bought the team and renamed them the Windsor Compuware Spitfires.

In the 1987–88 season, the culmination of a well-executed four-year plan saw the Compuware Spitfires win 35 of their last 36 games, become the first team to go undefeated in the OHL playoffs, and sweep the Peterborough Petes in the OHL Championship finals to win the J. Ross Robertson Cup. During the season, the Compuware Spitfires were dominant, with a record of 54-0 when leading after two periods. Having earned the right to represent the OHL in the 1988 Memorial Cup hosted in Chicoutimi, Quebec, the Compuware Spitfires advanced to the Championship game, where their string of success ended, losing to the Medicine Hat Tigers.

Karmanos sold the team to local construction magnate Steve Riolo after the 1988–89 season, and the team reverted the Windsor Spitfires name and adopted their modern logo.

=== Conflict, renewal, tragedy ===
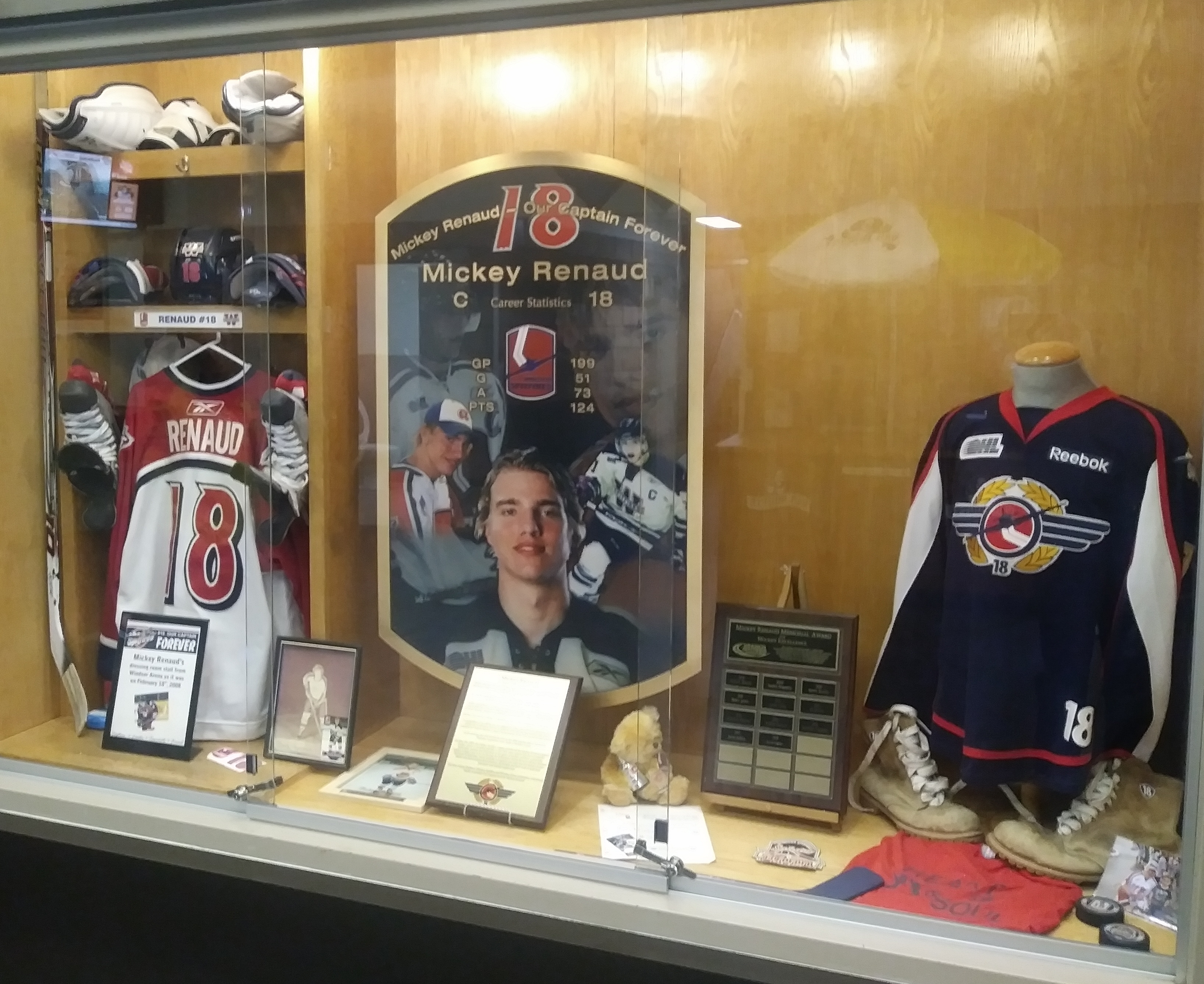
Renaud's memorial display at the WFCU Centre

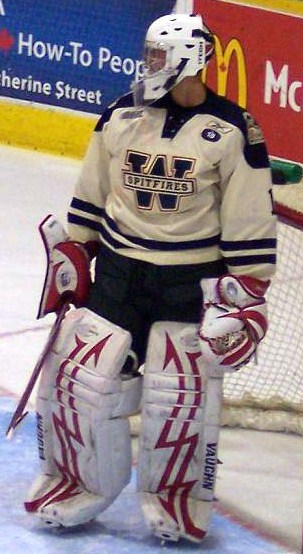
Andrew Engelage looks on, wearing Spitfires throwback jersey (November 2008).

On October 18, 2005, Head Coach Moe Mantha was handed a 40-game suspension and later terminated without pay, for a hazing incident that occurred aboard a bus after a pre-season game versus the London Knights. An altercation involving players Steve Downie and Akim Aliu, in which Aliu lost four teeth, led to public exposure of the compulsive hazing within the Spitfires organization. Downie was traded to the Peterborough Petes, and Aliu was traded to the Sudbury Wolves.

On April 6, 2006, the Ontario Hockey League Board of Governors announced the approval of a new ownership group for the Windsor Spitfires, composed of Bob Boughner, Warren Rychel and Peter Dobrich. All three men had history in Windsor with OHL hockey, and the group had expressed hope to move the team into a new arena. Boughner assumed the roles of President, CEO and head coach of the Spitfires, Rychel was named director of player development, and Dobrich the new business manager.

On February 18, 2008, team captain and Calgary Flames prospect Mickey Renaud died of an undetected heart condition in his Tecumseh, Ontario, home. General Manager Warren Rychel referred to Renaud's death as "the biggest tragedy in Spitfire history". His number was retired by both the Spitfires and the Tecumseh Chiefs Junior B franchise that he played on before graduating to Major Junior. Mayor Eddie Francis named a road leading to the WFCU Centre in Renaud's honour, Mickey Renaud Way. At the 2009 OHL All-Star Game at the WFCU Centre in Windsor, OHL Commissioner David Branch announced that the Mickey Renaud Captain's Trophy would be awarded to the "team captain that best exemplifies leadership on and off the ice as well as hard work, passion and dedication to the game of hockey and their community" in honour of Renaud.

=== 2008–09 season ===
The Windsor Spitfires finished the 2008–09 season with 57 wins, 10 losses, and 1 shootout loss. This marked their best season in franchise history. With the first overall record in the Ontario Hockey League the Spitfires were awarded the Hamilton Spectator Trophy. The Spitfires also played their final games in the Windsor Arena. The Spits were undefeated at home in the Old Barn during the 2008–09 season. Mid-season they moved to the WFCU Centre. The Spitfires and their new arena played host to the 2009 All-Star Game. On May 12, Goalie Andrew Engelage broke the OHL record for most wins by a goaltender in a single season with 46 with a 5–1 win over the Plymouth Whalers.

In the first round of the playoffs, the Spitfires walked all over the Owen Sound Attack, taking the series in four games. In the next round, the Spits found the Plymouth Whalers to be a more formidable opponent. After trading off-road wins, then trading off home wins, the Spits took Games 5 and 6 to clinch the series. In the Western Conference final, the Spits played their nemesis the London Knights. Led by John Tavares, the Knights were a tough opponent. Every game in the series went to overtime, but the Spitfires were victorious and won the series 4-games-to-1 to earn a berth to the OHL Final and take the Wayne Gretzky Trophy as Conference champions. The OHL Final began with a 10–1 victory for the Spitfires over the Eastern Conference's Brampton Battalion led by stars Cody Hodgson and Matt Duchene. The series became much tighter from there as the Spits took Game 2 5–3. The Battalion fought back in Game 3, winning 4–2. Game 4 belonged to the Spitfires as they took a 4–1 win and a 3–1 series lead. Game 5 was a tight affair, as the Spitfires took a 1–0 lead midway through the second period on the power play. Brampton tied the game up late in the third period to force overtime. At 2:09 of the first overtime period, Taylor Hall scored on the power play to win the Spitfires their second J. Ross Robertson Cup as league champions and a berth into the 2009 Memorial Cup. The victory was the Spitfires' first league title since the 1987–88 OHL season and marked their second time playing for the Memorial Cup. On May 9, Mayor of Windsor Eddie Francis awarded the team with the Key to the City in honour of their achievement.

At the 2009 Memorial Cup, the Spitfires dropped their first two games in Rimouski 3–2 in overtime to the Drummondville Voltigeurs and 5–4 to the Rimouski Océanic. In a do-or-die game, the Spitfires won the final game of the round robin 2–1 over the Kelowna Rockets to gain entry to the tie-breaker game. In the tie-breaker, Windsor defeated the hometown Océanic 6-4 powered by a third period natural hat-trick by Dale Mitchell. The tournament semi-final was between the Spitfires and the Voltigeurs. The Spitfires blew an early 2–0 lead, but won 3–2 in overtime from a goal by Adam Henrique to become the second team ever to play in the Memorial Cup final after playing in the tie-breaker game. In the final, the Spitfires again played the Rockets. The Spitfires scored on their first three shots and cruised to a 4–1 win to take their first ever Memorial Cup championship. Their victory marked the first time a team started with two losses in the Memorial Cup round robin and came back to win the championship. The feat also marks the first time that a team has survived the Memorial Cup tie-breaker game to win the championship. The Stafford Smythe Memorial Trophy was awarded to Taylor Hall as Memorial Cup playoffs most valuable player. Both Ryan Ellis and Hall were elected to the tournament's All-Star Team. Throughout the Memorial Cup tournament, the Spitfires hung Mickey Renaud's jersey on their bench and the championship was won in Renaud's memory.

In the aftermath of the championship, the team was met at the Windsor Airport by a large contingent of local fans and was addressed by Mayor Eddie Francis. It was announced that the road to the new WFCU Centre would be renamed Memorial Cup Drive in honour of the victory.

=== 2009–10 season ===
The Spitfires came back in 2009–10 with a second straight 50-plus win season, finishing with a record of 50 wins, 12 losses, 1 overtime loss, and 5 shootout losses. Their record was good enough to earn the top seed in the Western Conference, but not good enough to clinch their second straight Hamilton Spectator Trophy, won by the Barrie Colts (57-9-0-2). For being the top team in their division, the Spitfires were awarded their second straight Bumbacco Trophy. Taylor Hall tied Tyler Seguin of the Plymouth Whalers for the league's scoring lead, and both were awarded the Eddie Powers Memorial Trophy as scoring co-champions. The Spitfires also played host to the CHL Top Prospects Game.

The Spitfires sent six players to the 2010 World Junior Ice Hockey Championships. Defenceman Ryan Ellis and forwards Taylor Hall, Adam Henrique, and Greg Nemisz played for silver medalist Canada, defenceman Cam Fowler played for gold medalist United States, and forward Richard Panik played for Slovakia. At the end of the tournament, the Spitfires acquired defenceman Marc Cantin, forward Stephen Johnston and German goaltender Philipp Grubauer from the Belleville Bulls in exchange for forwards Panik and Austen Brassard, defenceman Paul Bezzo, goaltender Steve Gleeson and a seventh-round pick in the 2012 OHL Priority Selection.

In the first round of the OHL playoffs, the Spitfires swept the Erie Otters in four games. They then swept the Plymouth Whalers in four games to win their Conference Semi-Final. In the other semi-final, the Kitchener Rangers upset the favoured London Knights in seven games. In the Conference Finals against Kitchener, Windsor initially struggled, losing the first three games of the series. However, the Spitfires went on to become the third team in Ontario Hockey League history to come back from a three-game deficit to win a playoff series, beating Rangers in each of the next four games to win the conference championship and the Wayne Gretzky Trophy. Notably, the Spitfires had recovered from a 3–0 deficit to win a playoff series once before, in a 2004–05 Conference Quarterfinal series against the Sault Ste. Marie Greyhounds. In the league final, the Spitfires made quick work of a highly touted Barrie Colts squad, sweeping them in four games to win their second straight J. Ross Robertson Cup. Adam Henrique won the Wayne Gretzky 99 Award as the playoffs' most valuable player.

In May, the Spitfires traveled to Brandon, Manitoba, for the 2010 Memorial Cup. The Spitfires trampled the host Brandon Wheat Kings 9–3 in their first game of the tournament and, in their second game, scored a convincing 6–2 win over the Western Hockey League champion Calgary Hitmen. With their victory over the Hitmen, the Spitfires clinched a berth in the Memorial Cup final. They did not need to defeat the Quebec Major Junior Hockey League's Moncton Wildcats in their third and final round-robin game, but did so anyway, winning 4–3 in overtime. The tournament final saw the Spitfires play the host Wheat Kings for a second time. The Spitfires posted a convincing win once again, defeating the Wheat Kings 9–1 to clinch their second straight Memorial Cup. Their victory marked their twelfth straight win since going down 0–3 to Kitchener in the OHL's Western Conference Final, and they finished the playoffs with 20 wins against just 3 losses. Taylor Hall won his second straight Stafford Smythe Memorial Trophy as Memorial Cup most valuable player, making him the first repeat winner in the trophy's history.

=== 2010–11 season ===
After two straight Memorial Cups, the Summer of 2010 saw leading scorer Taylor Hall go first overall in the 2010 NHL entry draft to the Edmonton Oilers and Coach Bob Boughner accepted an assistant coaching job with the National Hockey League's Columbus Blue Jackets. The Spitfires have engaged in a massive overhaul involving many trades.

During the exhibition season, the Spitfires hosted the Czech Under-20 National Team. The Spitfires came back to win the game 5–4. Spitfires finished the exhibition schedule with 4 wins 1 loss and 1 tie.

After another successful season the Spits finished 4th in the Western Conference to advance to the playoffs. The Spitfires reached the Conference Final for the third consecutive year. Following two hard fought battles the Spits were eliminated from the playoffs for the first time in three years by the Owen Sound Attack. The Attack went on to win the OHL Championship.

=== 2011–12 season ===
After one season with the Columbus Blue Jackets as assistant coach, Bob Boughner returned to the Spitfires as head coach, with Bob Jones remaining on the staff as his assistant.

On August 10, 2012, the Spitfires were fined an unprecedented $400,000 CAD by the Ontario Hockey League and forfeited five first round OHL Priority Draft picks in 2013, 2014, and 2016 and second round picks in 2015 and 2017 for unspecified recruitment violations. The Spitfires claimed innocence to the recruitment violations and plan to appeal the decision.

=== 2013–14 season ===
On December 29, 2013, the Spitfires and the Saginaw Spirit played the first ever outdoor game in Ontario Hockey League history. The game was played at Comerica Park in Detroit, Michigan. The Spitfires won the game 6–5 in front of a short-lived Canadian Hockey League record of 25,749 spectators, surpassed later that night by the London Knights and Plymouth Whalers at the same venue.

=== 2014–15 season ===
On June 28, 2015, Spitfires owner and head coach Bob Boughner accepted another assistant coaching job with the NHL's San Jose Sharks. A couple of days later, former Oilers assistant coach Rocky Thompson was hired as the Spitfires new head coach, with Trevor Letowski accepting the assistant coaching job after former assistant coach Bob Jones was hired by the Oshawa Generals as head coach. Boughner's new job seemed to be very successful, as he and former Spitfire Peter DeBoer lead the team to the 2016 Stanley Cup Finals, losing to the Pittsburgh Penguins.

=== 2016–17 season ===
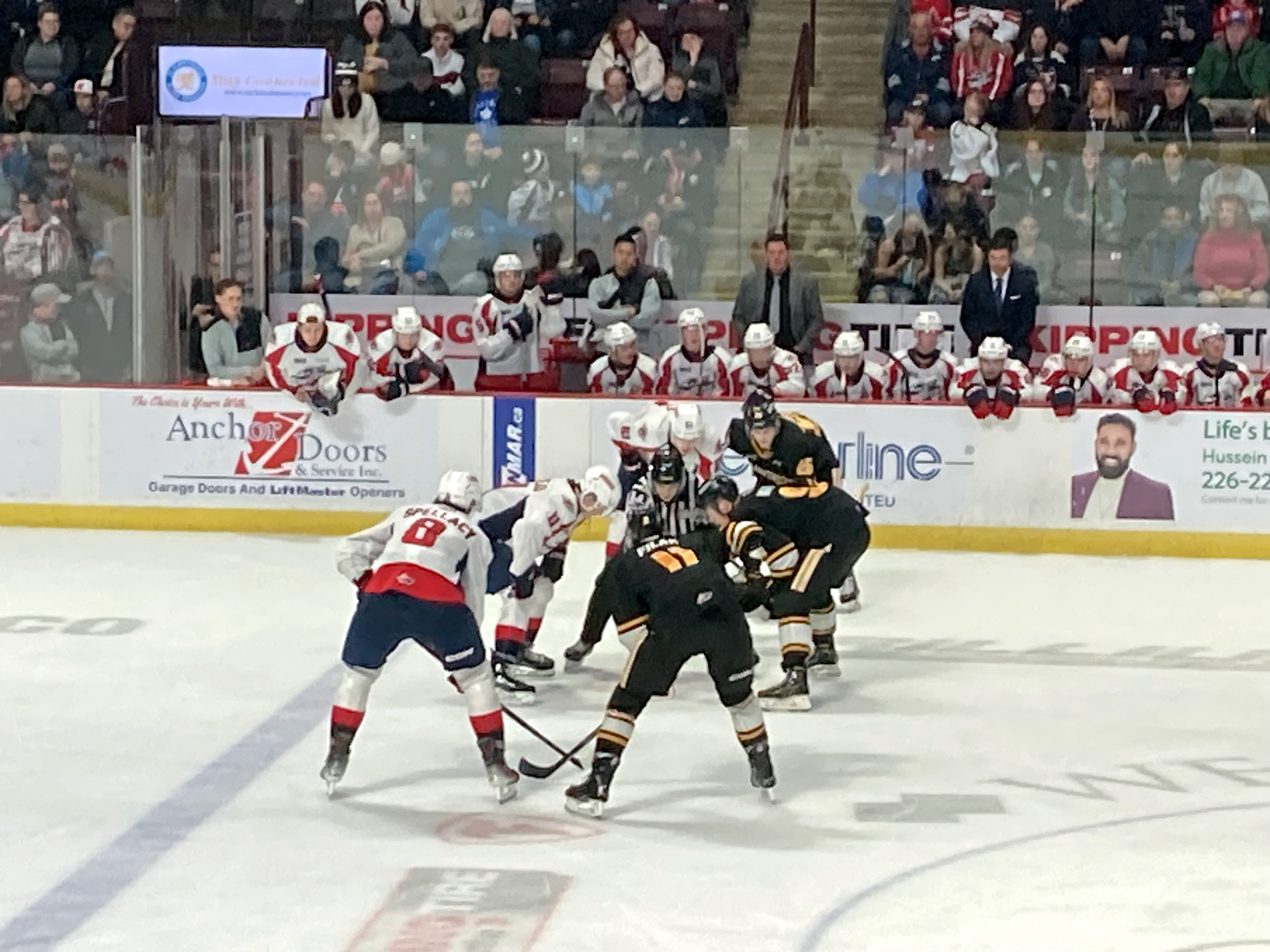
The Spitfires hosting the Sarnia Sting in 2023

Windsor was selected as the host city for the 99th Memorial Cup championship, who won the right to host the tournament over undisclosed competition. In defeating the Seattle Thunderbirds by 7–1 in a round-robin game on May 21, 2017, the Windsor Spitfires tied a Memorial Cup record for the fastest 3 goals scored by a team in a single period (38 game seconds), matching the record set by the WHL's New Westminster Bruins in the 1978 tournament. The tournament ended with the Windsor Spitfires winning their third Memorial Cup, defeating the Erie Otters 4–3 in the championship final.

On December 4, 2016, the Saginaw Spirit hosted the Spitfires in front of a crowd of over 3,100 people in the closing of Joe Louis Arena in Detroit, Michigan. The Spitfires got the best of the Spirit in a 3–2 overtime win, with a hat trick performance by defenceman Sean Day.

== Championships ==
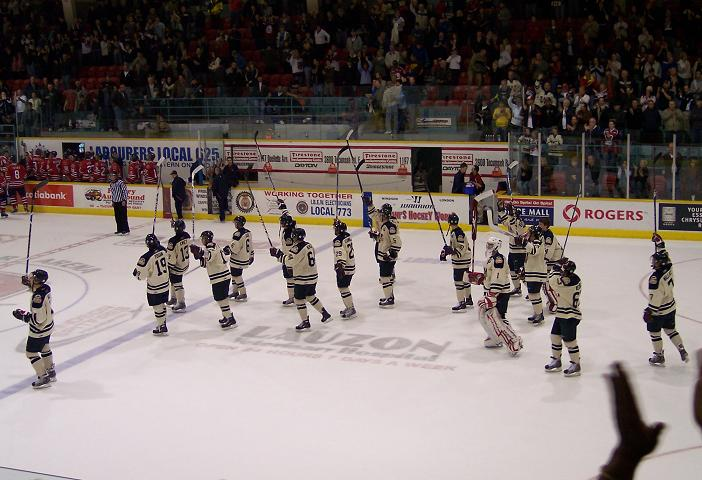
Spitfires salute fans in Windsor Arena as Oshawa Generals look on (November 2008)

The Windsor Compuware Spitfires won the Hamilton Spectator Trophy, the J. Ross Robertson Cup, and were the top-ranked junior team in Canada during the 1987–88 season.

Memorial Cup

- 1988 Finalist vs. Medicine Hat Tigers
- 2009 Champion vs. Kelowna Rockets
- 2010 Champion vs. Brandon Wheat Kings
- 2017 Champion vs. Erie Otters

J. Ross Robertson Cup

- 1980 Finalist vs. Peterborough Petes
- 1988 Champion vs. Peterborough Petes
- 2009 Champion vs. Brampton Battalion
- 2010 Champion vs. Barrie Colts
- 2022 Finalist vs. Hamilton Bulldogs

Emms Division Playoff Champions

- 1979 2nd place in Round Robin
- 1980 Champion vs. Brantford Alexanders
- 1986 Finalist vs. Guelph Platers
- 1987 Finalist vs. North Bay Centennials
- 1988 Champion vs. Hamilton Steelhawks

Wayne Gretzky Trophy West Conference Champions

- 2002 Finalist vs. Erie Otters
- 2009 Champion vs. London Knights
- 2010 Champion vs. Kitchener Rangers
- 2011 Finalist vs. Owen Sound Attack
- 2022 Champion vs. Flint Firebirds
- 2026 Finalist vs. Kitchener Rangers

Hamilton Spectator Trophy

- 1987–88 102 points
- 2008–09 115 points

Emms Trophy Emms Division Champions

- 1979-80 73 points
- 1987-88 102 points

Bumbacco Trophy West Division Champions

- 2008–09 115 points
- 2009-10 106 points
- 2021-22 95 points
- 2022-23 94 points
- 2024-25 96 points
- 2025-26 97 points

SOJAHL Regular Season Champions

- 1973-74 86 points
- 1974-75 85 points

SOJAHL Jack Oakes Trophy

- 1974 Champion vs. Chatham Maroons
- 1975 Finalist vs. Guelph CMC's

OHA Jr. A Frank L. Buckland Trophy

- 1974 Finalist vs. Wexford Raiders

== Coaches ==
- 1971–72 – Jerry Serviss and George Aitken
- 1972–73 – Jerry Serviss
- 1973–74 – Wayne Maxner
- 1974–75 – Dick Duff and Jim Butcher
- 1975–76 – Doug Johnston and Wayne Maxner
- 1976–1980 – Wayne Maxner
- 1980–81 – Ron Harris and Ron Carroll
- 1981–82 – Marcel Pronovost
- 1982–83 – Marcel Pronovost, Doug Imrie, John Becanic
- 1983–84 – Bob Boucher, Terry McConnell, Wayne Maxner
- 1984–85 – Mark Craig
- 1985–86 – Tom Webster
- 1986–87 – Tom Webster, Jim Rutherford, Tony McDonald
- 1987–1989 – Tom Webster
- 1989–91 – Brad Smith
- 1991–92 – Brad Smith, Wayne Maxner, Dave Prpich
- 1992–93 – Wayne Maxner, Kevin McIntosh
- 1993–94 – Shane Parker
- 1994–95 – Mike Kelly
- 1995–96 – Mike Kelly and Paul Gillis
- 1996–97 – Paul Gillis
- 1997–98 – Vern Stenlund, Dave Prpich, Tony Curtale
- 1998–99 – Tony Curtale and Dave Prpich
- 1999–2002 – Tom Webster
- 2002–03 – Tom Webster and Mike Kelly
- 2003–04 – Steve Smith and Mike Kelly
- 2004–05 – Mike Kelly
- 2005–06 – Moe Mantha Jr., Bill Bowler, and D.J. Smith (interim co-coaches)
- 2006–2010 – Bob Boughner
- 2010–11 – Bob Jones
- 2011–2015 – Bob Boughner
- 2015–2017 – Rocky Thompson
- 2017–2021 – Trevor Letowski
- 2021–2023 – Marc Savard
- July 24, 2023 – November 20, 2023 – Jerrod Smith
- November 20, 2023–present – Casey Torres (interim)

== Players ==
Over 100 alumni of the OHA and OHL Junior A Spitfires have graduated to play in the National Hockey League. Four of those alumni have been inducted into the Hockey Hall of Fame: Glenn Hall, Marcel Pronovost, Terry Sawchuk, and Al Arbour as coach.

Retired numbers

- # 4 – Taylor Hall
- # 6 – Ryan Ellis
- # 9 – Adam Graves, Bill Bowler
- # 15 – Ernie Godden
- # 14 - Steve Ott, Adam Henrique, Ed Jovanovski
- # 18 – Mickey Renaud
- # 23 – Scott Miller

Honoured numbers

- # 4 – Marcel Pronovost
- # 6 – Joel Quenneville
- # 11 – Gordon Haidy

=== Award winners ===
Season	Player(s)	Award	Recognition
1973–74	Scott Miller	SOJHL Leading Scorer Award	Top points scorer
1974–75	John Tavella	SOJHL Leading Scorer Award	Top points scorer
1974–75	Floyd St. Cyr	SOJHL Top Goaltender Award	Most outstanding goaltender
1980–81	Ernie Godden	Red Tilson Trophy	Most outstanding player (MVP)
1987–88	Darrin Shannon	Max Kaminsky Trophy	Most outstanding defenceman
1987–88	Darrin Shannon	Bobby Smith Trophy	Scholastic Player of the Year
1987–88	Darrin Shannon	CHL Scholastic Player of the Year	Player who best combines success on ice and in school
1990–91	Cory Stillman	Emms Family Award	Top first-year player (Rookie of the Year)
1991–92	Todd Warriner	CHL Top Draft Prospect Award	Top eligible prospect for the NHL Entry Draft
1994–95	Bill Bowler	Leo Lalonde Memorial Trophy	Best overage player
1996–97	Peter Sarno	Emms Family Award	Top first-year player (Rookie of the Year)
1997–98	Peter Sarno	Eddie Powers Memorial Trophy	Top point scorer
2000–01	Jason Spezza	CHL Top Draft Prospect Award	Top eligible prospect for the NHL Entry Draft
2002–03	Kyle Wellwood	William Hanley Trophy	Most sportsmanlike player
2002–03	Kyle Wellwood	CHL Sportsman of the Year	Most sportsmanlike player
2007–08	Taylor Hall	Emms Family Award	Top first-year player (Rookie of the Year)
2007–08	Taylor Hall	CHL Rookie of the Year	CHL Rookie of the Year
2007–08	Ryan Ellis	Bobby Smith Trophy	Scholastic Player of the Year
2007–08	Bob Boughner	Matt Leyden Trophy	Coach of the Year
2007–08	Bob Boughner	Brian Kilrea Coach of the Year Award	CHL Coach of the Year
2008–09	Ryan Ellis	Max Kaminsky Trophy	Most outstanding defenceman
2008–09	Taylor Hall	Wayne Gretzky 99 Award	MVP of OHL playoffs
2008–09	Bob Boughner	Matt Leyden Trophy	Coach of the Year
2008–09	Bob Boughner	Brian Kilrea Coach of the Year Award	CHL Coach of the Year
2008–09	Warren Rychel	OHL Executive of the Year	Top executive in OHL
2009; Memorial; Cup	Taylor Hall	Stafford Smythe Memorial Trophy	Most Valuable player at the Memorial Cup
2009; Memorial; Cup	Ryan Ellis, Taylor Hall	Memorial Cup All-Star Team	Best players by position at the Memorial Cup tournament
2009–10	Taylor Hall	Eddie Powers Memorial Trophy	Top point scorer (tie)
2009–10	Derek Lanoue	Roger Neilson Memorial Award	Top academic post-secondary school player
2009–10	Adam Henrique	Wayne Gretzky 99 Award	MVP of OHL playoffs
2010; Memorial; Cup	Taylor Hall	Stafford Smythe Memorial Trophy	Most Valuable player at the Memorial Cup
2010; Memorial; Cup	Taylor Hall	Ed Chynoweth Trophy	Top scorer in the Memorial Cup
2010; Memorial; Cup	Cam Fowler, Taylor Hall	Memorial Cup All-Star Team	Best players by position at the Memorial Cup tournament
2010–11	Derek Lanoue	Roger Neilson Memorial Award	Top academic post-secondary school player
2010–11	Ryan Ellis	Max Kaminsky Trophy	Most outstanding defenceman
2010–11	Ryan Ellis	Red Tilson Trophy	Most outstanding player (MVP)
2010–11	Ryan Ellis	Mickey Renaud Captain's Trophy	Most valuable team captain
2015–16	Michael DiPietro	F. W. "Dinty" Moore Trophy	First-year goaltender with best GAA
2015–16	Mikhail Sergachev	Max Kaminsky Trophy	Most outstanding defenceman
2017; Memorial; Cup	Michael DiPietro	Hap Emms Memorial Trophy	Most outstanding goaltender at the Memorial Cup
2017; Memorial; Cup	Michael DiPietro, Mikhail Sergachev, Gabriel Vilardi	Memorial Cup All-Star Team	Best players by position at the Memorial Cup tournament
2017-18	Michael DiPietro	OHL Goaltender of the Year	Best goaltender in the league
2021–22	Wyatt Johnston	Eddie Powers Memorial Trophy	Top point scorer
2021–22	Wyatt Johnston	William Hanley Trophy	Most sportsmanlike player
2021–22	Wyatt Johnston	Red Tilson Trophy	Most outstanding player (MVP)
2022–23	Matthew Maggio	Eddie Powers Memorial Trophy	Top point scorer
2022–23	Matthew Maggio	Jim Mahon Memorial Trophy	Top scoring right winger
2022–23	Matthew Maggio	Leo Lalonde Memorial Trophy	Best overage player
2022–23	Matthew Maggio	Red Tilson Trophy	Most outstanding player (MVP)
2024–25	Liam Greentree	Mickey Renaud Captain's Trophy	Most valuable team captain
2024–25	Ilya Protas	William Hanley Trophy	Most sportsmanlike player

=== NHL alumni ===
SOJHL Spitfires (1971–1975)

- Frank Bathe
- Frank Beaton
- Ted Bulley
- Rick Heinz
- Ken Mann
- Eddie Mio

Modern Spitfires (1975–present)

- Russ Adam
- Egor Afanasyev
- Jamie Allison
- Josh Bailey
- Peter Bakovic
- Blair Barnes
- John Barrett
- Bruce Bell
- Bryan Bickell
- Jesse Blacker
- Mark Botell
- Bill Bowler
- Kip Brennan
- Logan Brown
- Jack Campbell
- Jalen Chatfield
- Jason Cirone
- Matt Cooke
- Mark Cundari
- Will Cuylle
- Patrick Davis
- Michael DiPietro
- Peter DeBoer
- Steve Downie
- Richie Dunn
- Mike Dwyer
- Murray Eaves
- Matt Elich
- Ryan Ellis
- Glen Featherstone
- Fedor Fedorov
- Christian Fischer
- Jean-Luc Foudy
- Cam Fowler
- Ron Friest
- Paul Gagne
- Mario Giallonardo
- Todd Gill
- Tim Gleason
- Ernie Godden
- David Goverde
- Josh Gratton
- Adam Graves
- Philipp Grubauer
- David Haas
- Matt Hackett
- Taylor Hall
- Mark Hamway
- Dave Hannan
- Shawn Heins
- Timo Helbling
- Adam Henrique
- Jim Hofford
- Josh Ho-Sang
- Peter Ing
- Pat Jablonski
- Cam Janssen
- Wes Jarvis
- Wyatt Johnston
- Michal Jordan
- Ed Jovanovski
- Claude Julien
- Zack Kassian
- Tim Kerr
- Alexander Khokhlachev
- Bill Kitchen
- Slater Koekkoek
- Chris Kotsopoulos
- Tom Kuhnhackl
- Mark LaVarre
- Paul Lawless
- Michael Leighton
- Brendan Lemieux
- Claude Loiselle
- Andrei Loktionov
- Lane MacDermid
- Paul MacDermid
- Shawn MacKenzie
- Dan Mandich
- Darwin McCutcheon
- Roland Melanson
- Scott Metcalfe
- Craig Muni
- Trevor Murphy
- Greg Nemisz
- Michal Neuvirth
- Jordan Nolan
- Cal O'Reilly
- Steve Ott
- Richard Panik
- Bob Parent
- Steve Peters
- Mark Plantery
- Joel Quenneville
- Mark Renaud
- Gerry Rioux
- Dave Roche
- Mike Rupp
- Kerby Rychel
- Peter Sarno
- Travis Scott
- Mikhail Sergachev
- Darrin Shannon
- Darryl Shannon
- Rob Shearer
- Justin Shugg
- Patrick Sieloff
- Jason Simon
- Brad Smith
- D. J. Smith
- Jason Spezza
- Cory Stillman
- Jamie Storr
- Scott Timmins
- Gabriel Vilardi
- Jason Ward
- Todd Warriner
- Austin Watson
- Steve Webb
- Mike Weber
- Eric Wellwood
- Kyle Wellwood
- Behn Wilson
- Garrett Wilson
- Shane Wright
- Jason York
- Jeff Zehr

== Season-by-season results ==
Regular season and playoffs results:

- Windsor Spitfires (1971–1975)
- Windsor Spitfires (1975–1984)
- Windsor Compuware Spitfires (1984–1989)
- Windsor Spitfires (1989–present)

Legend: GP = Games played, W = Wins, L = Losses, T = Ties, OTL = Overtime losses, SL = Shoot-out losses, Pts = Points, GF = Goals for, GA = Goals against

Memorial Cup champions	League champions	League finalists

Season	Regular season											Playoffs
Season	GP	W	L	T	OTL	SOL	Pts	Pct	GF	GA	Finish	Playoffs
1971–72	56	21	32	3	–	–	45	0.402	220	266	6th SOJAHL	Lost quarterfinal (Chatham Maroons) 4–1
1972–73	60	30	21	9	–	–	69	0.575	286	273	3rd SOJAHL	Won quarterfinal (Niagara Falls Flyers) 4–3; Lost semifinal (Guelph CMC's) 4–0
1973–74	62	39	15	8	–	–	86	0.694	379	242	1st SOJAHL	Won semifinal (Detroit Jr. Red Wings) 4–0; Won SOJAHL final (Chatham Maroons) 4–1; Lost 1974 Centennial Cup quarterfinal (Wexford Raiders) 4–3
1974–75	60	40	15	5	–	–	85	0.708	320	207	1st SOJAHL	Won semifinal (Detroit Jr. Red Wings) 4–1; Lost SOJAHL final to (Guelph CMC's) 4–3–1
Spitfires joined the Ontario Major Junior Hockey League as an expansion franchise in 1975
1975–76	66	12	50	4	–	–	28	0.212	251	470	6th Emms	Did not qualify
1976–77	66	21	37	8	–	–	50	0.379	294	386	5th Emms	Won preliminary round (Kitchener Rangers) 3–0; Lost quarterfinals (St. Catharines Fincups) 4–2
1977–78	68	36	24	8	–	–	80	0.588	338	289	2nd Emms	Lost quarterfinals (Hamilton Fincups) 9–3.
1978–79	68	32	35	1	–	–	65	0.478	323	322	3rd Emms	Won quarterfinals (London Knights) 9–7 (Note: The series was protested by the London Knights, resulting in the both teams advancing into a round-robin series versus the Niagara Falls Flyers.); Lost semifinal round-robin (Niagara Falls Flyers and London Knights)
1979–80	68	36	31	1	–	–	73	0.537	323	344	1st Emms	Won quarterfinals (Niagara Falls Flyers) 4–1; Won semifinals (Brantford Alexanders) 4–3; Lost OMJHL finals (Peterborough Petes) 4–0
1980–81	68	33	33	2	-	-	68	0.500	322	337	2nd Emms	Won division semifinals (Brantford Alexanders) 8–4; Lost division finals (Kitchener Rangers) 9–1
1981–82	68	22	42	4	–	–	48	0.353	269	343	6th Emms	Won division quarterfinals (Niagara Falls Flyers) 6–4; Lost division semifinals (Kitchener Rangers) 8–0
1982–83	70	19	50	1	–	–	39	0.279	289	394	6th Emms	Lost division quarterfinals (North Bay Centennials) 6–0
1983–84	70	22	46	2	–	–	46	0.329	280	379	6th Emms	Lost division quarterfinals (Sault Ste. Marie Greyhounds) 6–0
1984–85	66	28	35	3	–	–	59	0.447	267	301	5th Emms	Lost division quarterfinals (London Knights) 8–0
1985–86	66	34	26	6	–	–	74	0.561	280	259	3rd Emms	Won division quarterfinals (Kitchener Rangers) 8–2; 2nd place round-robin (Guelph Platers and North Bay Centennials); Lost division finals (Guelph Platers) 8–4
1986–87	66	36	25	5	–	–	77	0.583	287	249	3rd Emms	Won division quarterfinals (Sault Ste. Marie Greyhounds) 4–0; Won division semifinals (Hamilton Steelhawks) 4–0; Lost division finals (North Bay Centennials) 4–2
1987–88	66	50	14	2	–	–	102	0.773	396	215	1st Emms	Won division quarterfinals (Kitchener Rangers) 4–0; Bye through quarterfinals Won semifinals (Hamilton Steelhawks) 4–0; Won OHL finals (Peterborough Petes) 4–0; Lost 1988 Memorial Cup final (Medicine Hat Tigers) 7–6
1988–89	66	25	37	4	–	–	54	0.409	272	321	5th Emms	Lost division quarterfinals (Niagara Falls Thunder) 4–0
1989–90	66	17	41	8	–	–	42	0.318	233	341	8th Emms	Did not qualify
1990–91	66	33	29	4	–	–	70	0.530	307	279	4th Emms	Won division quarterfinals (London Knights) 4–3; Lost quarterfinals (Niagara Falls Thunder) 4–0
1991–92	66	25	33	8	–	–	58	0.439	272	316	5th Emms	Lost division quarterfinals (Kitchener Rangers) 4–3
1992–93	66	19	42	5	–	–	43	0.326	240	343	8th Emms	Did not qualify
1993–94	66	25	36	5	–	–	55	0.417	253	298	7th Emms	Lost division quarterfinals (Sault Ste. Marie Greyhounds) 4–0
1994–95	66	41	22	3	–	–	85	0.644	303	232	2nd Western	Won division quarterfinals (Sarnia Sting) 4–0; Lost quarterfinals (Sudbury Wolves) 4–2
1995–96	66	21	41	4	–	–	46	0.348	256	312	4th Western	Lost division quarterfinals (Detroit Whalers) 4–3
1996–97	66	29	29	8	–	–	66	0.500	303	285	3rd Western	Lost division quarterfinals (Sarnia Sting) 4–1
1997–98	66	19	42	5	–	–	43	0.326	261	340	6th Western	Did not qualify
1998–99	68	23	39	6	–	–	52	0.382	203	294	5th West	Lost conference quarterfinals (Plymouth Whalers) 4–0
1999–2000	68	35	30	2	1	–	73	0.529	213	231	4th West	Won conference quarterfinals (Sarnia Sting) 4–3; Lost conference semifinals (Plymouth Whalers) 4–1
2000–01	68	34	22	8	4	–	80	0.559	257	221	2nd West	Won conference quarterfinals (Owen Sound Attack) 4–1; Lost conference semifinals (Plymouth Whalers) 4–0
2001–02	68	33	24	6	5	–	77	0.529	253	229	3rd West	Won conference quarterfinals (Sault Ste. Marie Greyhounds) 4–2; Won conference semifinals (Guelph Storm) 4–1; Lost conference finals (Erie Otters) 4–1
2002–03	68	37	25	5	1	–	80	0.581	259	221	3rd West	Lost conference quarterfinals (London Knights) 4–3
2003–04	68	27	30	3	8	–	65	0.419	201	219	3rd West	Lost conference quarterfinals (London Knights) 4–0
2004–05	68	26	29	6	7	–	65	0.478	223	253	3rd West	Won conference quarterfinals (Sault Ste. Marie Greyhounds) 4–3; Lost conference semifinals (London Knights) 4–0
2005–06	68	32	29	–	3	4	71	0.522	247	253	3rd West	Lost conference quarterfinals (Plymouth Whalers) 4–3
2006–07	68	18	43	–	2	5	43	0.316	209	311	5th West	Did not qualify
2007–08	68	41	15	–	7	5	94	0.691	279	205	2nd West	Lost conference quarterfinals (Sarnia Sting) 4–1
2008–09	68	57	10	–	0	1	115	0.846	311	171	1st West	Won conference quarterfinals (Owen Sound Attack) 4–0; Won conference semifinals (Plymouth Whalers) 4–2; Won conference finals (London Knights) 4–1; Won OHL finals (Brampton Battalion) 4–1; Won 2009 Memorial Cup final (Kelowna Rockets) 4–1
2009–10	68	50	12	–	1	5	106	0.779	331	203	1st West	Won conference quarterfinals (Erie Otters) 4–0; Won conference semifinals (Plymouth Whalers) 4–0; Won conference finals (Kitchener Rangers) 4–3; Won OHL finals (Barrie Colts) 4–0; Won 2010 Memorial Cup final (Brandon Wheat Kings) 9–1
2010–11	68	39	23	–	3	3	84	0.618	280	247	2nd West	Won conference quarterfinals (Erie Otters) 4–3; Won conference semifinals (Saginaw Spirit) 4–2; Lost conference finals (Owen Sound Attack) 4–1
2011–12	68	29	32	–	5	2	65	0.478	213	258	4th West	Lost conference quarterfinals (London Knights) 4–0
2012–13	68	26	33	–	3	6	61	0.449	212	278	5th West	Did not qualify
2013–14	68	37	28	–	3	0	77	0.566	249	235	2nd West	Lost conference quarterfinals (London Knights) 4–0
2014–15	68	24	40	–	2	2	52	0.382	223	305	5th West	Did not qualify
2015–16	68	40	21	–	6	1	87	0.640	253	200	2nd West	Lost conference quarterfinals (Kitchener Rangers) 4–1
2016–17	68	41	19	–	5	3	90	0.662	232	185	2nd West	Lost conference quarterfinals (London Knights) 4–3; Berth in 2017 Memorial Cup as host team Won 2017 Memorial Cup final (Erie Otters) 4–3
2017–18	68	32	30	–	4	2	70	0.515	214	224	3rd West	Lost conference quarterfinals (Sarnia Sting) 4–2
2018–19	68	25	33	–	5	5	60	0.441	216	257	4th West	Lost conference quarterfinals (London Knights) 4–0
2019–20	62	34	20	–	8	0	76	0.613	256	233	3rd West	Playoffs cancelled due to the COVID-19 pandemic
2020–21	Season cancelled due to the COVID-19 pandemic											
2021–22	68	44	17	–	4	3	95	0.699	305	248	1st West	Won conference quarterfinals (Sarnia Sting) 4–2; Won conference semifinals (Kitchener Rangers) 4–1; Won conference finals (Flint Firebirds) 4–3; Lost OHL finals (Hamilton Bulldogs) 4–3
2022–23	68	44	18	–	4	2	94	0.691	320	265	1st West	Lost conference quarterfinals (Kitchener Rangers) 4–0
2023–24	68	18	42	–	5	3	44	0.324	247	360	5th West	Did not qualify
2024–25	68	45	17	–	4	2	96	0.706	309	223	1st West	Won conference quarterfinals (Sault Ste. Marie Greyhounds) 4–1; Lost conference semifinals (Kitchener Rangers) 4–3
2025–26	68	44	15	–	6	3	97	0.713	264	173	1st West	Won conference quarterfinals (Guelph Storm) 4–0; Won conference semifinals (Flint Firebirds) 4–0; Lost conference finals (Kitchener Rangers) 4–1

== Uniforms and logos ==
The new logo features an aggressive, stylized World War II Spitfire fighter plane set against clouds on a red, white and blue shield with the word "Spitfires" emblazoned prominently in the forefront. The logo preserves the team's primary colours of red and blue, but uses richer, more vibrant hues and adds silver and yellow as secondary colours.

The Spitfires worked with the Ontario Hockey League and Reebok – official supplier of uniforms to the OHL – in finalizing the new uniform. The new jerseys sport shoulder patches featuring the vintage Spitfire plane encircled by a gold laurel wreath and containing the number 18 to commemorate former Spitfires captain Mickey Renaud. Both the primary logo and shoulder patch designs were collaborations by Marcello Fontana and Shane Potvin, both senior art directors at Hargreaves Stewart.

The Windsor Spitfires use white jerseys on the road until Christmas and at home in the new year and the red jerseys at home until Christmas and on the road in the new year. The Spitfires briefly used a third jersey featuring a white, red and green colour scheme and an alternate logo featuring an airplane flying in front of the Ambassador Bridge. When the team was also known as the Compuware Spitfires the team's colours were brown and orange, with a logo featuring a Spitfire airplane. The original Spitfires logo featured a maple leaf.

== Arena ==
The Spitfires play their home games at the WFCU Centre, an arena located on the east end of Windsor. The WFCU Centre played host to its first Spitfires game on December 11, 2008, against the Belleville Bulls. The Spitfires lost the game 4–0, which also broke a string of 12 home wins the Spitfires had amassed so far that season.

The Spitfires previously played at Windsor Arena, built in 1924 in downtown Windsor, Ontario. The arena was originally known as the "Border Cities Arena" and was once home to the Detroit Red Wings of the NHL prior to 1927. The Windsor Arena, nicknamed "The Barn," was the oldest operating facility in the Canadian Hockey League. It hosted the OHL All-Star game in 1978, and the Memorial Cup in 1981. On December 4, 2008, the Windsor Spitfires played their last game at "The Barn" against the Guelph Storm, winning 2–1.

== Broadcasters ==
CKLW is the current flagship radio station of the Spitfires. It had been a longtime broadcaster of the Spitfires, but dropped the team in the 2002–03 season. After two seasons without a radio broadcaster at all, CKUE-FM picked up the Spitfires for the 2004-2005 and 2005–2006 seasons, before the team returned to CKLW beginning in the 2006–07 season. Games on CKLW are commentated by Mike Miller and Steve Bell, former on-air CKLW sports anchor.

On television, Spitfires games are broadcast by YourTV Windsor, a community channel carried on Cogeco's cable system in Windsor. Domenic Papa previously hosted and provided colour commentary for Spitfires games, alongside Bill Kelso on play-by-play and Brian Trenholm with analysis. However, in August 2012, TVCogeco announced that the long-time crew would be replaced for the 2012–13 season. The move to fire the Spitfires' long-time broadcast team was met with backlash and protests from Spitfires fans and other members of Windsor's sports community. The current team consists of host Angelo Aversa, CKSY-FM morning show and former London Knights studio host Chris McLeod on play-by-play, and former Soo Greyhounds coach Nick Warriner on colour.

== See also ==
- List of ice hockey teams in Ontario
