= Peter Scamurra =

American ice hockey player (born 1955)

- Born: February 23, 1955 (age 71) Buffalo, New York, U.S.
- Height: 6 ft 3 in (191 cm)
- Weight: 185 lb (84 kg; 13 st 3 lb)
- Position: Defence
- Shot: Left
- Played for: Washington Capitals; SaiPa
- NHL draft: 19th overall, 1975; Washington Capitals
- WHA draft: 50th overall, 1975; Cleveland Crusaders
- Playing career: 1975–1981

Peter Vincent Scamurra (born February 23, 1955) is an American-born former professional ice hockey defenseman. He played 132 games in the National Hockey League with the Washington Capitals from 1975 to 1979. He was drafted 19th overall in 1975 by the Capitals and 50th overall by the Cleveland Crusaders of the World Hockey Association.

== Hockey career ==
=== Early career ===
Scamurra was born in Buffalo, New York and raised in Williamsville, New York. He started playing ice hockey in fifth grade while attending Nichols School. He attended high school at Amherst Central High School and captured the Erie County Interscholastic Conference first singles tennis title, while ranked as a top-ten tennis player in the area.

=== Junior Hockey ===
During his senior year of high school Scamurra played hockey for the Niagara Falls Flyers in the Southern Ontario Junior A Hockey League. There, he was scouted by Bob Johnson, then the coach at the Wisconsin Badgers Ice Hockey Team, which had just won the 1973 NCAA National Championship. Scamurra played 13 games for the University of Wisconsin in 1973-74 as a left winger, when he was offered a contract by Roger Neilson, then head coach of the Peterborough Petes of the Ontario Hockey Association to play defense. He played the final 35 games for the Petes in 1973-74, who were runners-up for the J. Ross Robertson Cup.

Team Canada was represented by the Peterborough Petes in the inaugural 1974 World Junior Ice Hockey Championships, and Scamurra played for the team, despite being American. He scored one goal in the tournament, and Canada finished with the bronze medal.

Scamurra played for the Petes again in 1974-75, leading defensemen in goals, and finishing with 52 points in 62 games.

=== Professional Hockey ===
Scamurra was selected 19th overall by the Washington Capitals in the 1975 NHL Draft, as the highest American taken in the draft that year. At the time he was the first player drafted in the NHL from the Buffalo area, and remained the highest selected from the region until Patrick Kane was selected first overall in the 2007 NHL Draft.

He was invited to a tryout for Team USA in the 1976 Canada Cup but did not make the final team.

Scamurra played in parts of four seasons for the Capitals between 1974 and 1980, but was often sidelined, having four knee surgeries throughout his career. He briefly played in the SM-liiga, playing 16 games for SaiPa in 1980-81.

In 2019, Scamurra was inducted into the Greater Buffalo Sports Hall of Fame.

== Personal life ==
Scamurra's daughter, Hayley Scamurra, is a professional ice hockey player who currently plays for Montreal Victoire of the PWHL and also represented the United States in the 2022 Winter Olympics, winning the silver medal with the team. Haley Scamurra won a gold medal winner with the women's hockey team in the 2026 Winter Olympics in Italy.

== Career statistics ==
=== Regular season and playoffs ===
			Regular season					Playoffs
Season	Team	League	GP	G	A	Pts	PIM	GP	G	A	Pts	PIM
1972–73	Niagara Falls Flyers	SOJHL	55	12	30	42	48	—	—	—	—	—
1973–74	University of Wisconsin	B1G	13	2	1	3	18	—	—	—	—	—
1973–74	Peterborough Petes	OHA	35	3	11	14	12	—	—	—	—	—
1974–75	Peterborough Petes	OMJHL	62	12	40	52	45	11	2	5	7	12
1975–76	Washington Capitals	NHL	58	2	13	15	33	—	—	—	—	—
1975–76	Richmond Robins	AHL	18	2	1	3	12	—	—	—	—	—
1976–77	Washington Capitals	NHL	21	0	2	2	8	—	—	—	—	—
1976–77	Springfield Indians	AHL	11	2	5	7	6	—	—	—	—	—
1977–78	Binghamton Dusters	AHL	13	2	2	4	20	—	—	—	—	—
1978–79	Washington Capitals	NHL	30	3	5	8	12	—	—	—	—	—
1979–80	Washington Capitals	NHL	23	3	5	8	6	—	—	—	—	—
1980–81	SaiPa	FIN	14	1	3	4	10	—	—	—	—	—
1980–81	Binghamton Whalers	AHL	6	1	2	3	4	—	—	—	—	—
NHL totals			132	8	25	32	59	—	—	—	—	—

=== International ===
Year	Team	Event	GP	G	A	Pts	PIM
1974	Canada	WJC	5	2	0	2	12
Junior totals			5	2	0	2	12
