= Parent (disambiguation) =

A parent is a caretaker of offspring in their own species, such as a mother or father.

Parent or parents may also refer to:

== Places ==
- Parent, Minnesota, an unincorporated community in Benton County, in the United States
- Parent, Puy-de-Dôme, a commune of the Puy-de-Dôme département, in France
- Parent, Quebec, a community within the city of La Tuque, Quebec, in Canada
  - Parent railway station, a Via Rail station in the community

== Entertainment and publishing ==
- Parents (magazine), a magazine about child development
- "Parents", a song by Budgie from the 1973 album Never Turn Your Back on a Friend
- "Parents", a song by Denzel Curry from the 2013 album Nostalgic 64
- "Parents", a song by Descendents from the 1982 album Milo Goes to College

=== Film and TV ===
- Parents (1989 film), horror film
- Parents (2007 film), Icelandic film
- Parents (2016 film), Danish film
- Parents (TV series), 2012 British sitcom on Sky1
- "Parents" (House), an episode of the American television series House
- "Parents" (Up All Night), an episode of the American television series Up All Night
- "The Parents", an episode of the American television series Smash
- "The Parents" (The Amazing World of Gumball), an episode of the British-American television series The Amazing World of Gumball
- "Parents" (My Hero), an episode of the British television series My Hero
- "Parents", an episode of the anime Mushoku Tensei

== People ==
- Parent (surname), list of people named Parent

== Other uses ==
- Parent bug, Elasmucha grisea, a shield bug
- Parent chain, in organic chemistry, an unbranched compound
- Parent class, in object-oriented programming
- Parent company, a company that owns enough voting stock to control another firm
- Parent drug, similar to metabolites of drugs
- Parent node, a node directly connected to another node in a tree data structure
- Parent peak, a mountain of higher elevation connected to another peak
