= Ken Mann =

Canadian ice hockey player (born 1953)

- Born: September 5, 1953 (age 72) Hamilton, Ontario, Canada
- Height: 5 ft 11 in (180 cm)
- Weight: 210 lb (95 kg; 15 st 0 lb)
- Position: Right wing
- Shot: Right
- Played for: Detroit Red Wings
- NHL draft: undrafted
- Playing career: 1973–1978

Kenneth Ross Mann (born September 5, 1953) is a Canadian retired professional ice hockey right winger who played in one National Hockey League game for the Detroit Red Wings during the 1975–76 season. Mann previously served as a coach in the national senior amateur men's ice hockey league.

== Career statistics ==
=== Regular season and playoffs ===
			Regular season					Playoffs
Season	Team	League	GP	G	A	Pts	PIM	GP	G	A	Pts	PIM
1971–72	Hamilton Red Wings	OHA	36	1	11	12	40	—	—	—	—	—
1972–73	Windsor Spitfires	SOJHL	58	44	35	79	214	—	—	—	—	—
1973–74	Port Huron Wings	IHL	68	32	26	58	46	—	—	—	—	—
1974–75	Virginia Red Wings	AHL	68	14	19	33	82	—	—	—	—	—
1975–76	Kalamazoo Wings	IHL	76	39	35	74	100	6	3	2	5	4
1975–76	Detroit Red Wings	NHL	1	0	0	0	0	—	—	—	—	—
1976–77	Kalamazoo Wings	IHL	45	23	23	46	46	—	—	—	—	—
1976–77	Kansas City Blues	CHL	31	7	9	16	14	—	—	—	—	—
NHL totals			1	0	0	0	0	—	—	—	—	—

== See also ==
- List of players who played only one game in the NHL
