= Joe Contini =

Canadian ice hockey player

- Born: January 29, 1957 (age 68); Galt, Ontario, Canada
- Height: 5 ft 10 in (178 cm)
- Weight: 178 lb (81 kg; 12 st 10 lb)
- Position: Centre
- Shot: Left
- Played for: Colorado Rockies; Minnesota North Stars
- NHL draft: 126th overall, 1977; Colorado Rockies
- Playing career: 1977–1982

Joseph Mario Contini (born January 29, 1957) is a Canadian retired professional ice hockey forward who played 68 games in the National Hockey League for the Colorado Rockies and Minnesota North Stars.

== Junior career ==
Born in Galt, Ontario, Contini made an immediate impact during his rookie season as a member of the Hamilton Fincups of the Ontario Hockey League (OHL). Contini helped the Fincups to a 37–24–9 record in the 1974/75 season, amassing 90 points in the process. Contini continued his strong OHL career during the 1975/76 season earning 80 points his sophomore season. He was a key contributor on a very good Fincups team that won the 1976 Memorial Cup. Contini had an outstanding Memorial Cup, setting the record for fastest two goals during a Memorial Cup game (2 in 8 seconds) and fastest 3 goals (3 in 72 seconds) during their game on May 12, 1976 vs New Westminster. He is also tied for the most points ever in a single Memorial Cup game with 6 (May 12, 1976 vs New Westminster – 3 G, 3 A) in an 8–4 Hamilton victory.

Contini's third and final OHL season was cut short due to injury, he played only 28 games, but amassed 46 points on 17 goals and 29 assists. Fortunately, Contini was able to play for Canada men's national junior ice hockey team in the 1977 World Junior Ice Hockey Championships. Contini finished third on the squad in points, with 4 goals and 6 assists in 7 games, and helped his country earn a silver medal.

== Pro career ==
Contini was drafted by the Colorado Rockies in the eighth round, 126th overall, in the 1977 NHL amateur draft. Contini played 37 games for the Rockies in the 1977/78 season, scoring 12 goals and adding 9 assists for 21 points. Contini followed up his rookie season with 5 goals and 12 assists in 30 games for the Rockies. Contini split the 1979/80 season between the Fort Worth Texans, scoring goal and adding two assists for three points in 8 games, and the Oklahoma City Stars, where he played 58 games, scoring 19 goals and adding 43 assists for 63 points.

Contini signed with the Minnesota North Stars as a free agent prior to the 1980/81 season, but only suited up for the North Stars for 1 game. He spent the remainder of the season with the Oklahoma City Stars, scoring 32 goals and 63 assists for 95 points in 77 games. Contini played his final pro season with the Hershey Bears and the Muskegon Mohawks. Contini played 56 games in Hershey, earning 57 points in 56 games with 20 goals and 37 assists and 17 games in Muskegon, where he tallied 9 goals and 7 assists.

== Coaching ==
At the age of 26, Contini was named head coach of the Guelph Platers of the OHL. He spent two years at the helm, from 1982 to 1984.

== Career statistics ==
=== Regular season and playoffs ===
			Regular season					Playoffs
Season	Team	League	GP	G	A	Pts	PIM	GP	G	A	Pts	PIM
1973–74	Guelph Biltmore Mad Hatters	SOJHL	—	—	—	—	—	—	—	—	—	—
1974–75	Hamilton Fincups	OMJHL	68	27	63	90	152	17	4	19	23	27
1975–76	Hamilton Fincups	OMJHL	54	28	52	80	105	14	9	20	29	50
1975–76	Hamilton Fincups	M-Cup	—	—	—	—	—	3	4	4	8	6
1976–77	St. Catharines Fincups	OMJHL	28	17	29	46	61	6	0	0	0	0
1977–78	Colorado Rockies	NHL	37	12	9	21	28	2	0	0	0	0
1977–78	Flint Generals	IHL	31	17	28	45	25	—	—	—	—	—
1977–78	Phoenix Roadrunners	CHL	2	0	0	0	2	—	—	—	—	—
1978–79	Colorado Rockies	NHL	30	5	12	17	6	—	—	—	—	—
1978–79	Philadelphia Firebirds	AHL	36	8	9	17	45	—	—	—	—	—
1979–80	Fort Worth Texans	CHL	8	1	2	3	13	—	—	—	—	—
1979–80	Oklahoma City Stars	CHL	58	19	43	62	56	—	—	—	—	—
1980–81	Minnesota North Stars	NHL	1	0	0	0	0	—	—	—	—	—
1980–81	Oklahoma City Stars	CHL	77	32	63	95	28	3	0	1	1	2
1981–82	Hershey Bears	AHL	56	20	37	57	68	5	1	5	6	6
1981–82	Muskegon Mohawks	IHL	17	9	7	16	4	—	—	—	—	—
NHL totals			68	17	21	38	34	2	0	0	0	0

=== International ===
Year	Team	Event	GP	G	A	Pts	PIM
1977	Canada	WJC	7	4	5	9	32
Junior totals			7	4	5	9	32
