= Paul Brydges =

Canadian former ice hockey centre

- Born: June 21, 1965 (age 59); Guelph, Ontario, Canada
- Height: 5 ft 11 in (180 cm)
- Weight: 180 lb (82 kg; 12 st 12 lb)
- Position: Centre
- Shot: Right
- Played for: Buffalo Sabres
- NHL draft: Undrafted
- Playing career: 1986–1990

Paul Brydges (born June 21, 1965) is a Canadian former ice hockey centre. He played fifteen games in the National Hockey League for the Buffalo Sabres during the 1986–87 season. He has also worked as an assistant coach for the Ontario Hockey League's Guelph Storm.

Brydges was born in Guelph, Ontario.

== Career statistics ==
			Regular season					Playoffs
Season	Team	League	GP	G	A	Pts	PIM	GP	G	A	Pts	PIM
1981–82	Guelph Platers	OJHL	45	16	15	31	30	—	—	—	—	—
1982–83	Guelph Platers	OHL	56	13	13	26	27	—	—	—	—	—
1983–84	Guelph Platers	OHL	68	27	23	50	37	—	—	—	—	—
1984–85	Guelph Platers	OHL	57	22	24	46	39	—	—	—	—	—
1985–86	Guelph Platers	OHL	62	17	40	57	88	19	10	15	25	22
1986–87	Buffalo Sabres	NHL	15	2	2	4	4	—	—	—	—	—
1986–87	Rochester Americans	AHL	54	13	17	30	54	1	0	0	0	0
1987–88	Rochester Americans	AHL	69	15	16	31	86	7	1	1	2	4
1988–89	Rochester Americans	AHL	51	8	3	11	36	—	—	—	—	—
1989–90	New Haven Nighthawks	AHL	37	6	7	13	38	—	—	—	—	—
NHL totals			15	2	2	4	4	—	—	—	—	—
AHL totals			211	42	43	85	214	8	1	1	2	4
