= WSMN =

Radio station in Nashua, New Hampshire

- Nashua, New Hampshire; United States
- Broadcast area: Merrimack Valley
- Frequency: 1590 kHz
- Branding: WSMN1590am WSMN95.3fm

Programming
- Format: Talk radio; brokered programming
- Affiliations: USA Radio News; Radio America; Westwood One; Motor Racing Network

Ownership
- Owner: Robert Bartis and George Russell; (Bartis and Russell Broadcasting, LLC)
- Sister stations: WLMW

History
- First air date: March 9, 1958
- Call sign meaning: "We Serve Manchester and Nashua", or Salem, Manchester, and Nashua

Technical information
- Licensing authority: FCC
- Facility ID: 102
- Class: D
- Power: 770 watts day; 58 watts night
- Transmitter coordinates: 42°45′34.32″N 71°28′35.24″W
- Translator: 95.3 W237FA (Nashua)

Links
- Public license information: Public file; LMS
- Webcast: Listen live; Listen live (via MP3)
- Website: www.wsmn.live

WSMN (1590 AM) is a commercial radio station broadcasting a talk radio format. It is licensed to Nashua, New Hampshire, and serves the Merrimack Valley. It is owned by George Russell and Bob Bartis. WSMN has some local talk shows and also features paid brokered programming.

WSMN transmits with 770 watts daytime, 58 watts nighttime. It uses a non-directional antenna at all times. Programming is also heard on 250-watt FM translator W237FA at 95.3 MHz.

== History ==
=== Early years ===
WSMN first signed on March 9, 1958. The first voice heard was that of Manchester, New Hampshire, native Frank G. Teas who spent the next 44 years with the station until he retired in December 2002. The original owner was the Merrimack Valley Broadcasting System. It sold the station only one year later, to 1590 Broadcasting Corporation.

For most of its early years, WSMN had a middle-of-the-road format, mixed in with talk. This format remained in place through the decade. The organization also published an advertiser-supported, free tabloid called the 1590 Broadcaster.

=== Country, adult standards and talk ===
During the mid-1990s, WSMN attempted a country music format. But country on AM radio became less viable after Boston country station WKLB-FM moved from 96.9 FM (now WBQT) to 99.5 FM (now WCRB). WSMN switched to adult standards in December 1997. This was short lived; in March 1998, the station changed to news/talk, though some timeslots were temporarily filled with adult contemporary music for a time.

Initially locally oriented, in June WSMN began adding nationally-produced programming, including Talk America shows and business news from Bloomberg Radio. Two years later, Tom O'Brien signed a local marketing agreement (LMA) to take over the station's operations.

=== Time off the air ===
WSMN was forced off the air February 1, 2005, after losing the lease to its transmitter and studio site on West Hollis Street (Route 111). The license was sold to Absolute Broadcasting, owner of WSNH (900; now WGHM) that July.

WSMN returned to the air in October from the WSNH tower, running a low-power special temporary authority signal. It initially simulcast WSNH's ESPN Radio programming. The station began shifting back to a news/talk format in early 2006. It began featuring programing from Talk Radio Network and Westwood One.

=== Bartis and Russell Broadcasting ===
Absolute Broadcasting sold WSMN to Bartis and Russell Broadcasting LLC for $200,000. The sale took effect on March 16, 2017. The proprietors are George Russell and Bob Bartis, who had both hosted shows on WSMN. They promised "more local programming and a refocus on the community."

WSMN formerly held a construction permit from the U.S. Federal Communications Commission to build a new three-tower array west of the old location. Instead of using the same directional pattern full-time, there would be different directional patterns for day and night. In July 2020, the station put an FM translator on the air at 95.3 MHz.

== Translator ==
Call sign	Frequency	City of license	FID	ERP (W)	Class	Transmitter coordinates	FCC info
W237FA	95.3 FM	Nashua, New Hampshire	202373	250	D	42°44′4.4″N 71°23′35.8″W	LMS

== Programming ==
WSMN airs Nashua This Morning with George Russell during morning drive time, with a mix of talk shows and brokered programming at other times. Bob Bartis continues to host shows on several topics. In timeslots where a talk show is not scheduled, the station airs blocks of music. WSMN is an affiliate of USA Radio News.

Other programing includes:

- "Asking for a Friend"
- "Barticus Live"
- "The Dana Loesch Show"
- "Latinos En Vivo"
- "Public Health Hour"
- "The Rayla Campbell Show Live"
- "Spouting Off with Host Karen Kataline"
- "Turning Pages with Elaine Holden"

== Former personalities ==
- Al Rock (general manager)
- Ed Lecius Sr. (news director)
- Frank Teas Sr. (program director)
- Weldon Haire
- Maury Parent
- Jeff Radzik
- Eric Nuernberg (Eric O’ Neil)
- Nick Diamond
- Jim Liversidge
- Robert "Woody" Woodland
- Robert "Bob" Bevill
- Chuck O'Neil
- Gerry Wood
- Kevin Farwell
- John Halbert
- Dee Dee Leigh
- Griff Vautier
- Russ Cooper
- Dale Lonroth
- Hal Hillard
- Tony Broseau
- Leo Zani
- Steve Shaw
- Herb Andrews
- Ernie Anastos
- Dianna Ploss
