= Guelph Platers =

Canadian junior ice hockey team (1968–1989)

- City: Guelph, Ontario
- League: CJBHL (1968–1970); SOJAHL (1970–1977); OPJAHL (1977–1982); OHL (1982–1989)
- Operated: 1968–1989
- Home arena: Guelph Memorial Gardens
- Colours: Red, yellow, and white

Franchise history
- 1968–1972: Guelph CMC's
- 1972–1975: Guelph Biltmore Mad Hatters
- 1975–1989: Guelph Platers
- 1989–2000: Owen Sound Platers
- 2000–present: Owen Sound Attack

Previous franchise history
- 1968–1969: Guelph Imperials
- 1969–1970: Guelph Beef Kings (merged)

Championships
- Playoff championships: 1972 Centennial Cup; 1978 Centennial Cup; 1986 Memorial Cup

The Guelph Platers were a junior ice hockey team based in Guelph, Ontario, Canada. The team played in the Ontario Hockey League, Ontario Provincial Junior A Hockey League, and Southern Ontario Junior A Hockey League. They were originally known as the CMC's until 1972, the Biltmore Mad Hatters until 1975, and then took on the name Platers. The Platers were promoted to the Ontario Hockey League in 1982 and moved to Owen Sound in 1989. The franchise played in the Guelph Memorial Gardens.

== History ==
=== Early years ===
The CMC's were founded as members of the Central Junior B Hockey League, now the Ontario Junior Hockey League, in 1968. In 1970, the CMC's merged with and took the place of the Guelph Beef Kings of the Western Junior "A" Hockey League (formerly the Western Division of the Big 10). The league was reincorporated into the Ontario Hockey Association and changed its name to the Southern Ontario Junior A Hockey League for the 1970–71 season. CMC was an acronym for Central Mechanical Contractors.

=== Southern Junior A ===
Logo until 1972

After two years playing in the SOJHL, the CMC's won the Junior 'A' league title, in the 1971–72 season. In the Ontario Championship, they took on the Thunder Bay Vulcans of the now defunct Thunder Bay Junior Hockey League. The CMC's were leading 3-games-to-2 (5–4, 5–4, 3–7, 0–7, 6–2) when they won the series by default after the Vulcans discontinued.

Moving onto the Eastern Canadian Final, the CMC's faced Charlottetown from the Island Junior Hockey League. The result of the series was a four-game sweep (5–2, 6–3, 5–2, 5–2), in favour of Guelph.

Guelph travelled to the Centennial Cup versus the Red Deer Rustlers of the Alberta Junior Hockey League. The CMC's swept the Rustlers (4–2, 3–2, 3–1, 3–0), taking the National title. The team was coached by Bill Taylor and starred Paul Fendley, Doug Risebrough, and John Van Boxmeer.

In 1972 the CMC's changed their names to the Guelph Biltmore Mad Hatters. The Biltmores won the SOJHL championship again in 1975, then defeated the Smiths Falls Bears of the Central Junior A Hockey League in 6 games (8–3, 3–4, 7–2, 6–4, 3–6, 5–2) to reach the Centennial Cup finals a second time.

Logo 1972–75

The Biltmores were defeated 4-games-to-2 (3–4, 2–3, 4–1, 5–2, 6–3, 6–5 OT) by the Spruce Grove Mets of the Alberta Junior Hockey League. The 1975 Biltmores were bolsterted on defence by late season pick-up Craig Hartsburg of Minnesota North Stars fame.

Following the season, the Biltmores were bought by the Holody family, the owners of a local electroplating company. The Holodys changed the team name to the Guelph Holody Platers.

In 1975, the Biltmores of the Southern Ontario Junior A Hockey League (SOJHL) were bought by Guelph, Ontario's wealthy Holody family, the owners of a local electroplating company. The team name was changed to the Guelph Holody Platers, and team remained in the SOJHL for the next two years, finishing first both times.

=== OHA Junior 'A' years ===
The SOJHL folded in 1977. Two of its four teams, Guelph and the Hamilton Mountain A's, became part of the Ontario Provincial Junior A Hockey League. The Platers, featuring future Montreal Canadiens goaltender Brian Hayward, won the 1977–78 Manitoba Centennial Trophy as national Junior 'A' champions. It was the second national title for the franchise, which had also won the Centennial Cup in 1972 as the CMC's.

In 1978–79, the Platers became the first team to win the Dudley Hewitt Cup as provincial champions. In the 1980–81 season, the Platers reached the Tier II championship for southern Ontario, but were defeated by another future OHL team, the Belleville Bulls. The 1981–82 season proved to be the last season for the Platers in the OHA-A. As they won their second Dudley Hewitt Cup, they were announced as the latest expansion team of the Ontario Hockey League.

Guelph Platers uniform history between 1975 and 1989

=== OHL Major Junior years ===
After being turned down as an OHL expansion team in 1981, Guelph was approved the next year for the 1982–83 season. Guelph's first season in the OHL was dismal. The team set OHL records at the time for losing 63 of their 70 games, for most home and away losses, and most goals against in one season with 555. All of these records have since been surpassed by other teams in the Canadian Hockey League.

In 1986, the Guelph Platers caught the entire Canadian Hockey League off-guard. Led by coach Jacques Martin, the team reached the playoffs for the first time in franchise history by finishing second in the Emms Division (Western Conference). The Platers continued their hard work through the playoffs, winning the J. Ross Robertson Cup by defeating the Belleville Bulls 8 points to 4 in the final. Guelph travelled to the Memorial Cup that year, bringing home the national championship to complete their Cinderella season.

=== 1986 Memorial Cup ===
The 1986 Memorial Cup championship was hosted by the Western Hockey League, with games originally scheduled for New Westminster, British Columbia, but were switched to Portland, Oregon due to a hotel shortage caused by Expo '86. Their opponents would be the Portland Winter Hawks (hosts), Kamloops Blazers (WHL Champs) and the Hull Olympiques (QMJHL Champs.

Guelph finished first in the round-robin and took a bye to the finals, where they would play the Hull Olympiques of the QMJHL for the championship. The surprise season ended with two pairs of surprise goals 11 and 13 seconds apart respectively. The Platers won the game 5–2 to capture the Memorial Cup.

Game	Home	Score	Away	Score
Game 1	Guelph Platers	5	vs. Kamloops Blazers	3
Game 2	Portland Winter Hawks	6	vs. Guelph Platers	4
Game 3	Guelph Platers	3	vs. Hull Olympiques	1
Final	Guelph Platers	5	vs. Hull Olympiques	2

Fame was short-lived for the Platers however. The team suffered through more losing seasons with poor attendance. After the 1988–89 season, the Holodys moved the team to Owen Sound, Ontario, retaining the name "Platers". Alec Campagnaro was given the Bill Long Award for distinguished service to the OHL in 1989.

== Championships ==
SOJAHL Jack Oakes Trophy final appearances: 1971 (lost), 1972 (won), 1975 (won), 1976 (won), 1977 (won)
OPJHL Frank L. Buckland Trophy final appearances: 1978 (won), 1979 (won), 1982 (won)
Ontario Hockey Association Tier II All-Ontario final appearances: 1972 (won), 1975 (won), 1976 (won), 1977 (lost), 1978 (won), 1979 (won), 1982 (won)
CJAHL Dudley Hewitt Cup final appearances: 1972 (won), 1975 (won) 1976 (lost), 1978 (won), 1979 (won), 1982 (won)
CJAHL Centennial Cup final appearances: 1972 (won), 1975 (lost), 1978 (won), 1982 (lost)
J. Ross Robertson Cup final appearances: 1986 (won)
Memorial Cup final appearances: 1986 (won)

== Coaches ==
Jacques Martin was a former NCAA goalie turned coach. In his one year in Guelph, he completely turned around the franchise making them into national champions. He was awarded the Matt Leyden Trophy as OHL Coach of the year in 1986. The following year he was hired as the head coach of the NHL St. Louis Blues.

- 1982–83 – Don McKee
- 1983–85 – Joe Contini
- 1983–85 – J.Contini, Mike Mahoney, Rob Holody
- 1985–86 – Jacques Martin
- 1986–87 – Gary Spoar, Rob Holody
- 1987–88 – Floyd Crawford
- 1988–89 – Ron Smith

== Players ==
=== Award winners ===
- 1982 – Kirk Muller, Jack Ferguson Award (First Overall draft pick) & 1982–83 William Hanley Trophy (Most Sportsmanlike player)
- 1983 – Trevor Stienburg, Jack Ferguson Award First Overall draft pick)
- 1985–86 – Lonnie Loach, Emms Family Award (Rookie of the Year)
- 1985–86 – Steve Guenette, Leo Lalonde Memorial Trophy (Overage Player of the Year)
- 1986–87 – Kerry Huffman, Max Kaminsky Trophy (Most Outstanding Defenceman)
- 1986–87 – John McIntyre, Bobby Smith Trophy (Scholastic Player of the Year)

=== Retired numbers ===
18 – Paul Fendley, a member of the SOJAHL's Guelph CMC's who died in an on-ice accident at Guelph Memorial Gardens in 1972. His number has not been issued to a player since, by the Guelph CMC's, Guelph Platers, or Guelph Storm. Paul Fendley's number was officially retired on Nov 15, 2008.

Paul Fendley of Georgetown, Ontario was a member of the 1971–72 Guelph CMC's who died as a result of an on ice accident at Guelph Memorial Gardens during Guelph's Centennial Cup 1972 victory. The 19-year-old player died at Kitchener-Waterloo General Hospital on May 8, 1972, seventy-three hours after striking his head on the arena ice.

Fendley was checked by an opponent with 11 minutes to play in the game. He tried to catch his balance while still handling the puck and lost his helmet in the process, falling and striking the bare back of his head on the ice.

Fendley was the 1972 SOJHL Leading Scorer with 20 goals and 24 assists in 43 games. He also scored 14 goals and 18 assists in 26 playoff games before his accident. The game in which he was fatally injured was the final and clinching game of the Centennial Cup.

=== NHL alumni ===
Platers

- List of alumni who played in the National Hockey League (NHL) or World Hockey Association (WHA):
- Bob Bodak
- Mike Blake
- Brian Bradley
- Paul Brydges
- Steve Chiasson
- John Cullen
- Dan Gratton
- Steve Guenette
- Craig Hartsburg
- Brian Hayward
- Todd Hlushko
- Kerry Huffman
- Denis Larocque
- Guy Larose
- Lonnie Loach
- Brian MacLellan
- Grant Martin
- John McIntyre
- Al MacIsaac
- George McPhee
- Kirk Muller
- Mike Murray
- Gary Roberts
- Warren Rychel
- Doug Shedden
- Trevor Stienburg
- Rob Whistle
- Sean Whyte
- Rob Zamuner

CMC's/Mad Hatters

- List of alumni who played in the NHL or WHA:
- Mike Blake
- Kirk Bowman
- Scott Campbell
- Tony Cassolato
- Joe Contini
- Craig Hartsburg
- Doug Risebrough
- Gary Sittler
- John Van Boxmeer

== Season-by-season results ==
- Guelph CMC's: Central Junior B Hockey League (1968–1970)
- Guelph CMC's: Southern Ontario Junior A Hockey League (1970–1972)
- Guelph Biltmore Mad Hatters: Southern Ontario Junior A Hockey League (1972–1975)
- Guelph Platers: Southern Ontario Junior A Hockey League (1975–1977)
- Guelph Platers: Ontario Provincial Junior A Hockey League (1977–1982)
- Guelph Platers: Ontario Hockey League (1982–1989)

Legend: GP = Games played, W = Wins, L = Losses, T = Ties, Pts = Points, GF = Goals for, GA = Goals against

National champions	National finalists	League champions	League finalists

Season	Regular season									Playoffs
Season	GP	W	L	T	Pts	Pct	GF	GA	Finish	Playoffs
1968–69	36	12	16	8	32	0.444	127	152	6th CJBHL	Did not qualify
1969–70	40	13	22	5	31	0.388	157	181	5th CJBHL	Did not qualify
1970–71	44	23	16	5	51	0.580	235	209	3rd SOJHL	Won semifinal (Chatham Maroons) 4–1–1; Lost SOJHL final (Detroit Jr. Red Wings) 3–2–2
1971–72	56	41	10	5	87	0.777	261	140	1st SOJHL	Won semifinal (St. Thomas Barons) 4–0; Won SOJHL final (Detroit Jr. Red Wings) 4–1; Won Buckland Cup final (Sault Ste. Marie Greyhounds) 3–0; Won regional semifinal (Thunder Bay Vulcans) 4–2; Won Dudley Hewitt Cup final (Charlottetown Islanders) 4–0; Won 1972 Centennial Cup final (Red Deer Rustlers) 4–0
1972–73	60	39	13	8	86	0.717	326	212	1st SOJHL	Won quarterfinal (Detroit Jr. Red Wings) 4–0; Won semifinal (Windsor Spitfires) 4–0; Lost SOJHL final (Chatham Maroons) 4–3–1
1973–74	62	34	24	4	72	0.581	343	258	4th SOJHL	Lost quarterfinal (Chatham Maroons) 4–0–1
1974–75	60	23	31	6	52	0.433	257	287	4th SOJHL	Won quarterfinal (Welland Sabres) 4–1; Won semifinal (Chatham Maroons) 3–2–2; Won SOJHL final (Windsor Spitfires) 4–3–1; Won Buckland Cup final (Toronto Nationals) 4–2; Won regional semifinal (Thunder Bay Eagles) 4–1; Won Dudley Hewitt Cup final (Smiths Falls Bears) 4–2; Lost 1975 Centennial Cup final (Spruce Grove Mets) 4–2
1975–76	60	41	9	10	92	0.767	400	238	1st SOJHL	Won semifinal (Welland Sabres) 4–1; Won SOJHL final (Chatham Maroons) 4–0; Won Buckland Cup final (North Bay Trappers) 4–1; Won regional semifinal (Thunder Bay Eagles) 4–1; Lost Dudley Hewitt Cup semifinal (Rockland Nationals) 4–3
1976–77	35	23	5	7	53	0.757	243	118	1st SOJAHL	Won semifinal (Owen Sound Greys) 4–2–1; Won SOJHL final (Collingwood Blues) 4–0; Lost Buckland Cup final (North York Rangers) 4–3
1977–78	50	38	8	4	80	0.800	360	197	1st OPJHL	Won quarterfinal (Wexford Raiders) 4–0; Won semifinal (North Bay Trappers) 4–2; Won OPJHL final (Royal York Royals) 4–1; Won Buckland Cup final (Degagne Hurricanes) 4–0; Won regional semifinal (Pembroke Lumber Kings) 4–1; Won Dudley Hewitt Cup final (Charlottetown Eagles) 4–2; Won 1978 Centennial Cup final (Prince Albert Raiders) 4–0
1978–79	50	33	12	5	71	0.710	294	186	1st OPJHL	Won quarterfinal (Markham Waxers) 4–0; Won semifinal (North York Rangers) 4–0; Won OPJHL final (Dixie Beehives) 4–1; Won Buckland Cup final (Nickel Centre Native Sons) 2–0; Won regional semifinal (Thunder Bay North Stars) 4–0; Won Dudley Hewitt Cup final (Hawkesbury Hawks) 4–2; Third place at 1979 Centennial Cup
1979–80	44	21	17	6	48	0.545	215	175	7th OPJHL	Lost quarterfinal (North York Rangers) 4–3
1980–81	44	32	10	2	66	0.750	269	187	2nd OPJHL	Won quarterfinal (Brampton Warriors) 4–0; Won semifinal (North York Rangers) 4–3; Lost OPJHL final (Belleville Bulls) 4–1
1981–82	50	40	4	6	86	0.860	328	152	1st OJHL	Won quarterfinal (North York Rangers) 4–0; Won semifinal (Richmond Hill Rams) 4–0; Won OJHL final (Markham Waxers) 4–1; Won Buckland Cup final (Onaping Falls Huskies) 3–0; Won regional semifinal (Thunder Bay Kings) 3–0; Won Dudley Hewitt Cup final (Pembroke Lumber Kings) 4–0; Won Eastern Canada final (Moncton Hawks) 4–1; Lost 1982 Centennial Cup final (Prince Albert Raiders) 4–0
Platers admitted as an expansion team to the Ontario Hockey League
1982–83	70	7	63	0	14	0.100	246	555	8th Emms	Did not qualify
1983–84	70	20	46	4	44	0.314	252	366	7th Emms	Did not qualify
1984–85	66	21	40	5	47	0.356	230	332	7th Emms	Did not qualify
1985–86	66	41	23	2	84	0.636	297	235	2nd Emms	Won division quarterfinal (Sudbury Wolves) 8–0; Won division semifinal round-robin (North Bay Centennials and Windsor Spitfires) 8–4–2; Won division final (Windsor Spitfires) 8–4; Won OHL final (Belleville Bulls) 8–4; Won 1986 Memorial Cup final (Hull Olympiques) 5–2
1986–87	66	29	35	2	60	0.455	275	281	6th Emms	Lost division quarterfinal (Hamilton Steelhawks) 4–1
1987–88	66	21	40	5	47	0.356	249	318	7th Emms	Did not qualify
1988–89	66	26	32	8	60	0.455	257	288	4th Emms	Lost division quarterfinal (London Knights) 4–3

== Arena ==
The Guelph Platers played at the Guelph Memorial Gardens located in downtown Guelph. The team and the arena played host to the OHL All-Star game in 1984. Demolition of the Gardens began in 2006.

== The Imperials and Beef Kings ==
The Guelph Imperials played the new Western Ontario Junior A Hockey League in the 1968–69 season, then played as the Guelph Beef Kings in the 1969–70 season. After two seasons of coexisting with the Junior B level Guelph CMC's, the teams merged in 1970, playing in the OHA as a Tier II Junior A league.

Season-by-season results

Legend: GP = Games played, W = Wins, L = Losses, T = Ties, Pts = Points, GF = Goals for, GA = Goals against

Season	Regular season									Playoffs
Season	GP	W	L	T	Pts	Pct	GF	GA	Finish	Playoffs
1968–69	56	23	32	1	47	0.420	232	276	4th WOJAHL	Lost semifinals 1–4 to Brantford Foresters
1969–70	57	21	35	1	43	0.377	206	286	4th WOJAHL	Lost semifinals 0–4 to Brantford Foresters

Preceded by Red Deer Rustlers	Centennial Cup Champions; 1972	Succeeded by Portage Terriers
Preceded by Prince Albert Raiders	Centennial Cup Champions; 1978	Succeeded by Prince Albert Raiders
