= Niagara Falls Flyers (1972–1976) =

Canadian junior ice hockey team

- City: Niagara Falls, Ontario
- League: Southern Ontario Junior A Hockey League
- Operated: 1972-1976
- Home arena: Niagara Falls Memorial Arena
- Colours: Black, Yellow, and White

The Niagara Falls Flyers were a Tier II Junior "A" ice hockey team and member of the Southern Ontario Junior A Hockey League. The team played home games at the Niagara Falls Memorial Arena in Niagara Falls, Ontario.

== History ==
In 1972, the Ontario Hockey Association's Tier I Junior "A" Niagara Falls Flyers were sold and relocated to Sudbury, Ontario as the Sudbury Wolves. They were replaced in Niagara Falls by the Tier II Flyers the same year.

They played four seasons in the Southern Ontario Junior A Hockey League. In 1976, the Tier II Flyers made way for the St. Catharines Black Hawks who were relocated as the second incarnation of the Tier I Niagara Falls Flyers.

== Season-by-season results ==
Season	GP	W	L	T	GF	GA	P	Results	Playoffs
1972-73	60	28	25	7	304	279	63	4th SOJAHL	
1973-74	62	27	27	8	314	283	62	6th SOJAHL	
1974-75	59	21	28	10	271	318	52	5th SOJAHL	
1975-76	60	12	45	3	272	410	27	6th SOJAHL	

=== Playoffs ===
- 1973 Lost quarter-final

Windsor Spitfires defeated Niagara Falls Flyers 4-games-to-3

- 1974 Lost quarter-final

Welland Sabres defeated Niagara Falls Flyers 4-games-to-1

- 1975 Lost quarter-final

Chatham Maroons defeated Niagara Falls Flyers 4-games-to-1 with 1 tie

- 1976 DNQ

== Notable alumni ==
- Cam Botting
- Willi Plett
- Peter Scamurra
