= Ernie Godden =

Canadian ice hockey player

- Born: March 13, 1961 (age 64); Keswick, Ontario, Canada
- Height: 5 ft 8 in (173 cm)
- Weight: 159 lb (72 kg; 11 st 5 lb)
- Position: Centre
- Shot: Left
- Played for: Klagenfurt AC (Austria); St. Catharines Saints (AHL); Cincinnati Tigers (CHL); Toronto Maple Leafs (NHL)
- NHL draft: 55th overall, 1981; Toronto Maple Leafs
- Playing career: 1981–1985

Ernie Alfred Godden (born March 13, 1961, in Keswick, Ontario) is a retired professional ice hockey centre who played five games for the Toronto Maple Leafs of the NHL He was chosen 55th overall by the Toronto Maple Leafs in 1981 after scoring 87 goals as a junior in the OHL and making the league's first all-star team. In addition to his brief tenure in Toronto, Godden spent his first three years as a top scorer in the CHL with the Cincinnati Tigers and the AHL's St. Catharines Saints. Godden played one year with Klagenfurter of Austria before retiring in 1985.

Perhaps his most notable accomplishments occurred while he was with the Windsor Spitfires of the Ontario Hockey League. In the 1980–81 season, he set an OHL record with 87 goals. This record is yet to be broken. During that season he totalled 153 points for the year.

He has a devoted following within the Ernie Godden fan club, which consists of many Essex County residents.

He currently coaches Minor Hockey in LaSalle, Ontario, for his son's team.

== Career statistics ==
			Regular season					Playoffs
Season	Team	League	GP	G	A	Pts	PIM	GP	G	A	Pts	PIM
1976–77	Newmarket Flyers	OPJHL	44	19	24	43	89	—	—	—	—	—
1977–78	Newmarket Flyers	OPJHL	40	20	24	44	67	—	—	—	—	—
1978–79	Windsor Spitfires	OMJHL	64	25	31	56	165	7	2	1	3	18
1979–80	Windsor Spitfires	OMJHL	62	40	41	81	158	16	9	7	16	36
1980–81	Windsor Spitfires	OHL	68	87	66	153	185	11	13	16	29	44
1981–82	Toronto Maple Leafs	NHL	5	1	1	2	6	—	—	—	—	—
1981–82	Cincinnati Tigers	IHL	67	32	37	69	178	3	1	0	1	38
1982–83	St. Catharines Saints	AHL	64	27	23	50	106	—	—	—	—	—
1983–84	St. Catharines Saints	AHL	78	31	36	67	69	7	4	1	5	28
1984–85	Klagenfurter AC	AUT	39	34	23	57	68	—	—	—	—	—
NHL totals			5	1	1	2	6	—	—	—	—	—
AHL totals			142	58	59	117	175	7	4	1	5	28
