= Buffalo-Glencoe Tondas =

- City: Buffalo, New York; Glencoe, Ontario
- League: Southern Ontario Junior A Hockey League
- Operated: 1973-74
- Colors: Blue, red, and white

Franchise history
- 1973: Buffalo Tondas
- 1973-74: Buffalo-Glencoe Tondas

The Buffalo-Glencoe Tondas are a defunct Tier II Junior "A" ice hockey team that played in Buffalo, New York, and later in Glencoe, Ontario, Canada. They played in the Southern Ontario Junior A Hockey League.

== History ==
The Tondas joined the Southern Ontario Junior A Hockey League in 1973. Their performance was not spectacular and they did not draw well. In early January 1974 the team was moved to Glencoe, Ontario, because the Tonawanda rink was being renovated. They were renamed the Buffalo-Glencoe Tondas.

The following season, the Tondas played one game, a 6-4 loss to Guelph on September 27, but on September 30, 1974, USA Hockey barred the Tondas from playing because they were using too many Canadian players. The Tondas sued USA hockey on antitrust grounds on October 15, 1974, but OHA hockey followed the ban and the Tondas were removed from the SOJHL.

== Season-by-season record ==
Season	GP	W	L	T	OTL	GF	GA	P	Results	Playoffs
1973-74	62	15	41	6	-	256	350	36	7th SOJAHL	DNQ
1974-75	1	0	1	-	-	4	6	0	DNF	
