= Detroit Jr. Red Wings (SOJHL) =

- City: Detroit, Michigan
- League: Southern Ontario Junior A Hockey League; North American Hockey League
- Operated: 1958–1983; 1987–1992
- Home arena: Olympia Stadium
- Colors: Red and White
- General manager: Tom Wilson
- Head coach: Tom Wilson
- Parent club: Detroit Red Wings

Franchise history
- 1958–1964: Detroit Jr. Wings
- 1964–1970: Detroit Olympia
- 1970–1975: Detroit Jr. Red Wings
- 1975–1983: Detroit Junior Wings
- 1987–1992: Detroit Junior Wings

The Detroit Jr. Red Wings are a defunct Tier II Junior "A" ice hockey team that was based out of Detroit, Michigan. They played out of the Southern Ontario Junior A Hockey League and were the feeder team for the National Hockey League's Detroit Red Wings.

== History ==
The Jr. Red Wings started out in 1958 as a member of the Border Cities Junior B Hockey League. When the league folded in 1964, the team went back to the United States to play in the Michigan Junior Hockey League. During this time, 1964–1970, the team was known as the Detroit Olympia.

After the last great schism of Canadian junior hockey in 1970, the Detroit Jr. Red Wings became the first team to ever be crowned Tier II Junior "A" Central Canadian Champions, winners of the very first Dudley Hewitt Cup. The Championship allowed them entry into the 1971 Centennial Cup Playdowns. The team was led by league Most Valuable Player and Scoring Leader Mark Howe, son of hockey legend Gordie Howe.

In the 1974-75 season the Junior Wings defeated the Minnesota Junior Stars in the finals to capture the American Junior A National Championship. The Junior Wings were headed up by Tom Wilson (General Manager) who had put together a team that included such notables as Ken Morrow of New York Islander fame (4 Stanley Cups and an Olympic Gold Medal (1980)) and Mark Wells (1980 Olympic Team).

Through the 1976-77 season, the team played out of Olympia Stadium with a facilities next to the Red Wings. They entered the newly formed Great Lakes Junior Hockey League (later known as the North American Hockey League) in 1976 and were called the Detroit Junior Wings. In the 1976-77 season Wilson was GM and ex-IHL referee veteran Skeets Harrison was head coach. Dave Feamster (Chicago Blackhawks) led the 1976 team that later sent the bulk of its roster to D-1 College Hockey. They played at The Olympia until 1983, when they went on hiatus. The team would be resurrected in 1987 for another five seasons of play in the NAHL. In 1992, the Red Wings gave their name to the Detroit Compuware Ambassadors Ontario Hockey League team and ended their affiliation with the NAHL. The NAHL would replace the team in the Detroit market the following season with the Detroit Freeze.

== Notable alumni ==
- Ken Morrow - 1980 U.S. Olympic Team/New York Islanders
- Mark Wells - 1980 U.S. Olympic Team
- Mark Howe - Philadelphia Flyers
- Gordie Roberts - Hartford Whalers
- Ron Serafini - Oakland Seals
- Gordie Buynak - St. Louis Blues
- Marty Howe - Boston Bruins
- Dave Feamster - Chicago Blackhawks
- Tom Wilson - Coach/General Manager
- Nick Musat - Michigan State Spartans

== Season-by-season results ==
| Season | GP | W | L | T | GF | GA | P | Results | Playoffs |
| 1958-59 | 12 | 6 | 6 | 0 | 46 | 64 | 18* | 3rd BCJBHL | |
| 1959-60 | 30 | 21 | 6 | 3 | 149 | 93 | 45 | 1st BCJBHL | |
| 1960-61 | 32 | 27 | 5 | 0 | 176 | 85 | 54 | 1st BCJBHL | |
| 1961-62 | 30 | 19 | 11 | 0 | 155 | 111 | 38 | 2nd BCJBHL | |
| 1962-63 | 35 | 23 | 11 | 1 | 157 | 116 | 47 | 2nd BCJBHL | |
| 1963-64 | 30 | 14 | 16 | 0 | 148 | 134 | 28 | 4th BCJBHL | |
| 1964-68 | Statistics Not Available | | | | | | | | |
| 1968-69 | 32 | 9 | 21 | 2 | 76 | 105 | 20 | 7th BCJHL | |
| 1969-70 | 34 | 32 | 2 | 0 | 279 | 55 | 64 | 1st MJHL | |
| 1970-71 | 44 | 26 | 12 | 6 | 279 | 197 | 58 | 2nd SOJAHL | Won League, won DHC |
| 1971-72 | 56 | 35 | 16 | 5 | 333 | 225 | 75 | 2nd SOJAHL | Lost final |
| 1972-73 | 60 | 19 | 37 | 4 | 237 | 318 | 42 | 6th SOJAHL | |
| 1973-74 | 62 | 31 | 25 | 6 | 293 | 278 | 68 | 5th SOJAHL | |
| 1974-75 | 61 | 15 | 37 | 9 | 202 | 276 | 39 | 6th SOJAHL | |
| 1975-76 | 48 | 34 | 11 | 3 | 234 | 152 | 71 | 2nd GLJHL | |
| 1976-77 | 48 | 30 | 12 | 6 | 287 | 197 | 66 | 2nd GLJHL | |
| 1977-78 | 49 | 33 | 12 | 4 | 320 | 212 | 70 | 2nd GLJHL | |
| 1978-79 | 50 | 27 | 17 | 6 | 317 | 242 | 60 | 2nd GLJHL | |
| 1979-80 | 46 | 22 | 21 | 3 | 226 | 229 | 47 | 4th GLJHL | |
| 1980-81 | 54 | 35 | 16 | 3 | 395 | 244 | 73 | 3rd GLJHL | |
| 1981-82 | 46 | 25 | 18 | 3 | 259 | 232 | 53 | 3rd GLJHL | |
| 1982-83 | 45 | 15 | 24 | 6 | 212 | 246 | 36 | 4th GLJHL | |
| 1987-88 | 32 | 16 | 9 | 7 | 182 | 133 | 39 | 2nd NAHL | |
| 1988-89 | 40 | 20 | 16 | 4 | 232 | 196 | 44 | 3rd Eastern Conference; NAHL | |
| 1989-90 | 44 | 24 | 18 | 2 | 221 | 200 | 50 | 2nd Eastern Conference; NAHL | |
| 1990-91 | 40 | 24 | 11 | 5 | | | 53 | 2nd Eastern Conference; NAHL | |
| 1991-92 | 44 | 20 | 17 | 7 | 189 | 170 | 47 | 2nd Eastern Conference; NAHL | |

(*) During the 1958-59 Season, the Jr. Red Wings played three 4-point games.

=== Playoffs ===
- 1971 Won League, lost Dudley Hewitt Cup final

Detroit Jr. Red Wings defeated Welland Sabres 3-games-to-none with 2 ties
Detroit Jr. Red Wings defeated Guelph CMC's 3-games-to-2 with 2 ties SOJHL CHAMPIONS
Detroit Jr. Red Wings defeated Ottawa M&W Rangers (CJHL) 4-games-to-2
Charlottetown Islanders (MJAHL) defeated Detroit Jr. Red Wings 4-games-to-3

- 1972 Lost final

Detroit Jr. Red Wings defeated Welland Sabres 4-games-to-1
Detroit Jr. Red Wings defeated Chatham Maroons 4-games-to-3
Guelph CMC's defeated Detroit Jr. Red Wings 4-games-to-1

- 1973 Lost quarter-final

Guelph CMC's defeated Detroit Jr. Red Wings 4-games-to-none

- 1974 Lost semi-final

Windsor Spitfires defeated Detroit Jr. Red Wings 4-games-to-none

- 1975 Lost semi-final

Windsor Spitfires defeated Detroit Jr. Red Wings 4-games-to-1
