= Brantford Eagles =

- City: Brantford, Ontario, Canada
- League: Greater Ontario Junior Hockey League
- Division: Mid-Western
- Operated: 1970–2012
- Home arena: Wayne Gretzky Sports Centre
- Colours: Black, yellow, and white
- General manager: Jake MacNeil
- Head coach: Jack Mullan
- Affiliates: Caledonia Corvairs (NDJCHL)

Franchise history
- 1970–1971: Brantford Jets
- 1971–1974: Brantford Gunners
- 1974–1982: Brantford Penguins
- 1982–1986: Brantford Alexander B's
- 1987–1992: Brantford Classics
- 1992–1998: Ohsweken Golden Eagles
- 1998–2002: Brant County Golden Eagles
- 2002–2008: Brantford Golden Eagles
- 2008–2012: Brantford Eagles
- 2012–present: Caledonia Corvairs

The Brantford Eagles were a Canadian junior ice hockey team based in Brantford, Ontario, Canada. They played in the Mid-Western Conference of the Greater Ontario Junior Hockey League.

On May 23, 2012, the Eagles were transplanted to Caledonia, Ontario, and renamed the Caledonia Corvairs, the name of the long-running Junior C team in the town.

== History ==
In 1967, the Brantford Majors were a member of the Niagara Junior "B" League. In 1968, a second Brantford team, by the name of the Foresters, joined the renegade Western Junior "B" League. The Foresters absorbed by the Majors in 1970 when the Majors joined the Southern Ontario Junior A Hockey League. The Majors folded in 1972.

In 1973, the Diamond Kings entered the Southwestern Junior "B" League. In 1974, an additional junior team was created in Brantford at the "C" level. When the Kings folded, the Penguins jumped up to Junior "B" to take their place. The Brantford Junior "B" franchise spent most of their early days in the Golden Horseshoe Junior B Hockey League. The Penguins originated in the Central Junior C Hockey League before jumping to the Southwestern Ontario Junior "B" before taking their place, as well, in the GHJHL.

In 1986, the Ontario Hockey Association, concerned with elevating violence in the game, banned the Brantford Classics and the Streetsville Derbys and both teams' management for at least one season.

Since 1987 the Brantford Eagles in one way or another have stayed the course with the Midwestern "B". Despite various name changes and a couple minor moves, the Eagles have been a charter member of the league for almost 20 years.

== Season-by-season results ==
Season	GP	W	L	T	OTL	GF	GA	P	Results	Playoffs
1970-71	Niagara Jr. B standings not available									
1971-74	Central Jr. C standings not available									
1974–75	36	10	23	3	–	160	269	23	5th CJCHL Gr 3	
1975–76	31	18	9	4	–	193	157	40	3rd CJCHL Gr 3	
1976–77	39	30	7	2	-	308	156	62	1st SWJBHL	Won League
1977–78	40	28	10	2	-	277	176	58	2nd SWJBHL	Won League
1978-79	42	27	12	3	-	254	254	57	2nd GHJHL	Lost final
1979-80	43	18	19	6	-	279	300	42	5th GHJHL	
1980-81	41	20	20	1	-	249	245	41	5th GHJHL	
1981-82	36	8	25	3	-	-	-	19	7th GHJHL	
1982-83	42	21	13	8	-	223	201	50	3rd GHJHL	
1983-84	42	23	13	6	-	241	210	52	4th GHJHL	Won League
1984-85	42	19	16	7	-	281	211	45	4th GHJHL	
1985-86	40	24	13	3	-	288	212	51	3rd GHJHL	Lost final
1986–87	Disciplinary suspension									
1987-88	48	22	25	1	-	210	235	45	6th MWJBHL	Lost quarter-final
1988-89	48	20	25	3	-	229	307	43	5th MWJBHL	Lost quarter-final
1989-90	48	25	23	0	-	281	245	50	5th MWJBHL	Lost semi-final
1990-91	48	30	17	1	-	287	208	61	4th MWJBHL	Lost semi-final
1991-92	48	15	31	2	-	161	257	32	7th MWJBHL	Lost quarter-final
1992-93	48	8	40	0	-	162	291	16	8th MWJBHL	Lost quarter-final
1993-94	48	3	45	0	-	128	455	6	9th MWJBHL	DNQ
1994-95	48	8	36	4	-	168	336	20	9th MWJBHL	DNQ
1995-96	48	5	43	0	-	130	351	10	9th MWJBHL	DNQ
1996-97	48	7	39	2	-	161	385	16	9th MWJBHL	DNQ
1997-98	48	0	47	1	-	78	494	1	10th MWJBHL	DNQ
1998-99	48	3	44	1	-	108	366	7	10th MWJBHL	DNQ
1999-00	48	11	35	2	-	146	282	24	8th MWJBHL	Lost quarter-final
2000-01	48	20	28	0	-	186	143	40	7th MWJBHL	Lost quarter-final
2001-02	48	4	42	2	-	138	323	10	10th MWJBHL	DNQ
2002-03	48	21	25	2	2	207	229	46	6th MWJBHL	Lost quarter-final
2003-04	47	18	28	0	1	139	182	37	8th MWJBHL	Lost quarter-final
2004-05	48	19	27	2	0	160	194	40	8th MWJBHL	Lost quarter-final
2005-06	48	34	11	3	-	207	123	71	2nd MWJBHL	Lost final
2006-07	48	20	22	4	2	154	169	46	6th MWJBHL	Lost quarter-final
2007-08	48	22	22	3	1	189	188	48	5th GOJHL-MW	Lost Conf. QF
2008-09	52	41	7	-	4	281	160	86	1st GOJHL-MW	Won League
2009-10	51	42	5	-	4	284	141	88	1st GOJHL-MW	Lost final
2010-11	51	33	14	-	4	228	178	70	3rd GOJHL-MW	Lost Conf. SF
2011-12	51	41	7	-	3	239	139	85	1st GOJHL-MW	Lost final

== Majors, Selects, Kings ==
Brantford Majors
- City: Brantford, Ontario, Canada
- League: Southern Ontario Junior A Hockey League; Southwestern Junior B Hockey League; Golden Horseshoe Junior B Hockey League
- Operated: 1967–1976

Franchise history
- 1967-1972: Brantford Majors
- 1972-1973: Brantford Selects
- 1973-1976: Brantford Diamond Kings
- 1976: Merged w/ Brantford Penguins

Season	GP	W	L	T	OTL	GF	GA	P	Results	Playoffs
1967-70	Niagara Jr. B standings not available									
1970-71	44	10	31	3	-	204	288	23	6th SOJAHL	
1971-72	56	18	32	6	-	193	220	42	7th SOJAHL	
1972-73	Niagara Jr. B standings not available									
1973-74	40	1	35	4	-	135	336	6	6th SWJBHL	
1974-75	40	3	31	6	-	154	297	12	6th GHJHL	
1975-76	40	14	24	2	-	195	244	30	5th GHJHL	

=== Playoffs ===
- 1971 DNQ
- 1972 DNQ

== Foresters ==
Brantford Foresters
- City: Brantford, Ontario, Canada
- League: Western Ontario Junior A Hockey League
- Operated: 1968–1970

Franchise history
- 1970: Merged with Brantford Majors

Season	GP	W	L	T	OTL	GF	GA	P	Results	Playoffs
1968-69	56	32	23	1	-	257	204	65	2nd WOJAHL	Lost final
1969–70	61	35	21	5	-	268	214	75	2nd WOJAHL	

=== Playoffs ===
- 1969 Lost final

Brantford Foresters defeated Guelph Imperials 4-games-to-1
St. Thomas Barons defeated Brantford Foresters 4-games-to-none

- 1970 Lost final

Brantford Foresters defeated Guelph Beef Kings 4-games-to-none
Chatham Maroons defeated Brantford Foresters 5-games-to-2

== Sutherland Cup appearances ==
2009: Brantford Eagles defeated Stoney Creek Warriors 4-games-to-1
2010: LaSalle Vipers defeated Brantford Eagles 4-games-to-1
2012: St. Catharines Falcons defeated Brantford Eagles 4-games-to-2

== George S. Dudley Trophy Super "C" appearances ==
1976: Woodstock Navy-Vets defeated Brantford Penguins 4-games-to-none

== Notable alumni ==
This list includes only National Hockey League alumni.

- Rob Blake
- Chris Gratton
- Brent Gretzky
- Adam Mair
- Adam Munro
- Paul Szczechura
