= Bob Parent (ice hockey) =

Canadian ice hockey player (born 1958)

- Born: February 19, 1958 (age 67); Windsor, Ontario, Canada
- Height: 5 ft 10 in (178 cm)
- Weight: 177 lb (80 kg; 12 st 9 lb)
- Position: Goaltender
- Caught: Right
- Played for: Toronto Maple Leafs
- NHL draft: 65th overall, 1978; Toronto Maple Leafs
- Playing career: 1978–1984

Robert John Parent (born February 19, 1958) is a Canadian retired professional ice hockey goaltender who played three games in the National Hockey League with the Toronto Maple Leafs during the 1981–82 and 1982–83 seasons. The rest of his career, which lasted from 1978 to 1984, was spent in the minor leagues.

== Career statistics ==
=== Regular season and playoffs ===
			Regular season									Playoffs
Season	Team	League	GP	W	L	T	MIN	GA	SO	GAA	SV%	GP	W	L	MIN	GA	SO	GAA	SV%
1975–76	Windsor Spitfires	OMJHL	9	5	4	0	377	53	0	8.44	—	—	—	—	—	—	—	—	—
1976–77	Windsor Spitfires	OMJHL	39	—	—	—	1689	161	0	5.73	—	7	5	2	332	19	0	3.43	—
1977–78	Windsor Spitfires	OMJHL	11	—	—	—	604	37	0	3.66	—	—	—	—	—	—	—	—	—
1977–78	Kitchener Rangers	OMJHL	48	—	—	—	2848	182	1	3.81	—	9	3	6	532	45	0	4.95	—
1978–79	Saginaw Gears	IHL	2	—	—	—	49	10	0	12.24	—	—	—	—	—	—	—	—	—
1978–79	Port Huron Flags	IHL	24	—	—	—	1177	73	0	3.72	—	—	—	—	—	—	—	—	—
1979–80	Port Huron Flags	IHL	37	—	—	—	2212	137	0	3.72	—	11	6	5	671	36	0	3.22	—
1980–81	Hampton Aces	EHL	46	—	—	—	2536	200	1	4.73	—	—	—	—	—	—	—	—	—
1980–81	New Brunswick Hawks	AHL	2	0	2	0	80	5	0	3.75	.881	13	7	6	845	39	0	2.77	—
1981–82	Toronto Maple Leafs	NHL	2	0	2	0	120	13	0	6.54	.827	—	—	—	—	—	—	—	—
1981–82	Cincinnati Tigers	CHL	65	34	24	3	3680	252	2	4.11	.868	3	1	2	180	13	0	4.33	—
1982–83	Toronto Maple Leafs	NHL	1	0	0	0	40	2	0	3.00	.909	—	—	—	—	—	—	—	—
1982–83	St. Catharines Saints	AHL	46	18	20	3	2485	180	1	4.35	—	—	—	—	—	—	—	—	—
1983–84	St. Catharines Saints	AHL	18	6	11	0	900	73	0	4.87	—	—	—	—	—	—	—	—	—
1983–84	Muskegon Mohawks	IHL	35	—	—	—	2063	185	0	5.38	—	—	—	—	—	—	—	—	—
NHL totals			3	0	2	0	160	15	0	5.65	.845	—	—	—	—	—	—	—	—
