= Maury Parent =

American radio personality (1932–2004)

Maurice R. Parent (August 8, 1932 – August 19, 2004) was a well-known radio personality in the Nashua, New Hampshire/Lowell, Massachusetts area from the 1950s until his death on August 19, 2004.

He was an on-air personality at WMUR, WOTW, WMVU, WSMN, and WMEX among others, eventually gaining the nickname "The Voice of the Merrimack Valley."

Parent was also active in the Nashua community, running for Ward 8 Alderman in the 1980s, and was one of the key forces along with co-host Georgi Hipauf in creating the Parc du Renaissance Française located on Water Street in downtown Nashua.

Parent died on August 19, 2004, at the age of 72 roughly a week after his birthday.
