= Welland Sabres =

- City: Welland, Ontario
- League: Southern Ontario Junior A Hockey League
- Operated: 1970-1976
- Home arena: Welland Main Arena
- Colours: Blue, Yellow, and White

The Welland Sabres are a defunct Tier II Junior "A" ice hockey team that were based out of Welland, Ontario and was a part of the Southern Ontario Junior A Hockey League.

== Season-by-season results ==
Season	GP	W	L	T	OTL	GF	GA	P	Results	Playoffs
1970-71	44	16	24	4	-	217	269	36	4th SOJAHL	
1971-72	56	20	31	5	-	223	261	45	6th SOJAHL	
1972-73	60	26	25	9	-	289	270	61	5th SOJAHL	
1973-74	62	38	18	6	-	394	257	82	2nd SOJAHL	
1974-75	60	30	16	14	-	271	228	74	2nd SOJAHL	
1975-76	60	26	28	6	-	277	304	58	3rd SOJAHL	

=== Playoffs ===
- 1971 Lost semi-final

Detroit Jr. Red Wings defeated Welland Sabres 3-games-to-none with 2 ties

- 1972 Lost quarter-final

Detroit Jr. Red Wings defeated Welland Sabres 4-games-to-1

- 1973 Lost semi-final

Chatham Maroons defeated Welland Sabres 4-games-to-2 with 1 tie

- 1974 Lost semi-final

Welland Sabres defeated Niagara Falls Flyers 4-games-to-1
Chatham Maroons defeated Welland Sabres 4-games-to-2

- 1975 Lost quarter-final

Guelph CMC's defeated Welland Sabres 4-games-to-1

- 1976 Lost semi-final

Guelph Platers defeated Welland Sabres 4-games-to-1

== Notable alumni ==
- Jim Bedard
- Ken Breitenbach
- Dan McCourt
