= Leslie Parent =

American microbiologist and immunologist

- Education: Duke University
- Known for: Retroviruses; Virology
- Scientific career
- Workplaces: Pennsylvania State University

Leslie J. Parent is an American microbiologist and immunologist currently professor and vice dean of the College of Medicine at Pennsylvania State University. She is an Elected Fellow of the American Association for the Advancement of Science and American Society for Microbiology.

== Education ==
She earned her M.D. in 1987 at Duke University followed by residency and training at Duke University Medical Center and Penn State College of Medicine.

== Research ==
Her research involves virology, retrovirus duplicating and biology. Her highest cited paper is "Positionally independent and exchangeable late budding functions of the Rous sarcoma virus and human immunodeficiency virus Gag proteins" cited at 278 times, according to Google Scholar.

== Awards and honors ==
- 2017- Fellow, American Association for the Advancement of Science

== Selected publications ==
- Bewley, MC; Reinhart, L; Stake, MS; Nadaraia-Hoke, S; Parent, LJ; Flanagan, JM (2017). "A non-cleavable hexahistidine affinity tag at the carboxyl-terminus of the HIV-1 Pr55^{Gag} polyprotein alters nucleic acid binding properties". Protein Expr Purif. 130: 137–145. doi:10.1016/j.pep.2016.10.001. PMC 5536344. PMID 27721079.
- Kaddis Maldonado, RJ; Parent, LJ (2016). "Orchestrating the Selection and Packaging of Genomic RNA by Retroviruses: An Ensemble of Viral and Host Factors". Viruses. 8 (9): 257. doi:10.3390/v8090257. PMC 5035971. PMID 27657110.
- Rye-McCurdy, T; Olson, ED; Liu, S; Binkley, C; Reyes, JP; Thompson, BR; Flanagan, JM; Parent, LJ; Musier-Forsyth, K (2016). "Functional Equivalence of Retroviral MA Domains in Facilitating Psi RNA Binding Specificity by Gag". Viruses. 8 (9): 256. doi:10.3390/v8090256. PMC 5035970. PMID 27657107.
- Stake, M; Singh, D; Singh, G; Marcela Hernandez, J; Kaddis Maldonado, R; Parent, LJ; Boris-Lawrie, K (2015). "HIV-1 and two avian retroviral 5' untranslated regions bind orthologous human and chicken RNA binding proteins". Virology. 486: 307–20. doi:10.1016/j.virol.2015.06.001. PMC 4877169. PMID 26584240.
