= Southern Ontario Junior A Hockey League =

Former junior ice hockey league in Ontario

Southern Ontario Junior "A" Hockey League
- Association: Ontario Hockey Association
- Founded: 1950
- Folded: 1977
- Last champion: Guelph Platers (1977)

The Southern Ontario Junior A Hockey League was a Tier II Junior "A" ice hockey that lasted from the late 1960s until 1977 in Southern Ontario, Canada. The league was swallowed by what is now called the Ontario Provincial Junior A Hockey League in 1977.

- The Big '10' Western Division Prior to 1956
- Western Ontario Junior "B" Hockey League 1956 - 1968
- Western Ontario Junior "A" Hockey League 1968 - 1970
- Southern Ontario Junior "A" Hockey League 1970 - 1977

== History ==
In 1956 the traditional Big '10' League was divided, its Western Division became the Western Ontario Junior "B" Hockey League, and the Central Division became the Central Junior "B" Hockey League.

In the 1960s, the Western Junior "B" Hockey League was arguably the top league of Junior "B" hockey in Ontario. The Western's brass and the team owners felt that they should, as a whole, be promoted to Junior "A" status. In 1968 the league applied to the Ontario Hockey Association, but were declined by Jack Devine who stated that the application was too late for the upcoming season. In September 1968, the league left the OHA and joined the rival Canadian Hockey Association led by Ron Butlin as president. The league changed names to the Western Ontario Junior A Hockey League (WOJAHL) with the move. CAHA president Lloyd Pollock stated that players leaving for the WOJAHL would face difficulty in being reinstated with the OHA, but no suspensions were issued.

The league operated outside of the OHA's jurisdiction for the next two seasons. After the 1969 playoffs, the WOJAHL champion St. Thomas Barons, starring future NHLer Ken Murray, faced off against future Hockey Hall of Famer Bobby Clarke and the Flin Flon Bombers of the Western Canada Hockey League to determine a National Champion outside of the Canadian Amateur Hockey Association. The first two games of the Best-of-Seven series took place in St. Thomas, Ontario. Flin Flon won game one 6-2, while St. Thomas returned the favour in game two with a 6-3 win. The teams then shipped out to Flin Flon, where the Bombers took game three 5-0. In game four, the Bombers led 4-0 at 10:10 of the second period, and the last of two brawls in the game would break out. In retaliation, the Barons walked off the ice. When St. Thomas made it clear they would not finish the series, the Canadian Hockey Association awarded the championship to the Bombers. Coach Keith Kewly and Manager Jack Cassidy were suspended one season by their league and the team was fined $700. The town of St. Thomas had to raise $4500 to bring the team back home from Manitoba. Initially the CHA suspended the Barons for the entire 1969-70 season, but the suspension was overturned by the WOJAHL.

In 1970, the Top Tier of Junior Hockey in Ontario broke away from the OHA. The OHA opened negotiations with the WOJAHL, and the league was welcomed back into the OHA as the top level in its system and changed its name to the Southern Ontario Junior "A" Hockey League.

The 1971 League title went to the Detroit Jr. Red Wings, starring Mark Howe and Marty Howe, sons of legend Gordie Howe. Detroit defeated Guelph 3-games-to-2 with two ties to clinch the title. Detroit went on to defeat the Ottawa M & W Rangers in the quarterfinals of the Centennial Cup before losing to the Charlottetown Islanders in the Eastern Final. The next season saw the Guelph CMC's challenge and defeat Detroit in the final 4-games-to-1. The CMC's pushed further and ended up winning the Manitoba Centennial Cup as Canadian Tier II Junior "A" Champions.

In 1973, the Chatham Maroons took the league crown and then defeated the newly formed Ontario Provincial Junior A Hockey League's champion the Wexford Warriors for the OHA Crown. The next season's title was won by the Windsor Spitfires who then fell to the Warriors in seven games.

The '75 title was won by the CMC's again. They made it all the way to the National title, but fell to the Alberta Junior Hockey League champion. In 1975-76, the CMC's were bought and renamed the Guelph Platers. They won the league once again, and moved on to the national title playdowns. Their first opponent was the Rockland Nationals of the Central Junior A Hockey League. After going up 3-games-to-none on them, the Platers fell apart and lost in seven games.

The league had six teams in 1975-76 but that was only due to the additions of the Hamilton Mountain A's and the Owen Sound Greys. The Jr. Red Wings had gone back to playing in the United States, the Sarnia Bees went to the newly formed Western Junior B Hockey League and the Windsor Spitfires moved up to the Ontario Hockey League.

In 1976-77 the Collingwood Blues also joined the league but three other teams dropped out, reducing the number of clubs to four. The Niagara Falls Flyers folded to make way for a new OHL franchise in that city, the Welland Sabres also folded and Chatham returned to Junior B.

After the 1977 playoffs, the league folded and the Platers and A's were invited to join the OPJHL. The Greys went on hiatus for one season and then moved up to the Major Intermediate A Hockey League. Collingwood returned to Junior B. The Guelph Platers joined the OHL in 1982 and are now known as the Owen Sound Attack.

== Teams ==
Former WOJHL/SOJHL Teams
Team	Centre	Joined	Exited	Status
Brantford Foresters	Brantford, Ontario	1968	1970	Merged w/ Majors
Brantford Majors	Brantford, Ontario	1970	1972	Joined NDJBHL
Buffalo-Glencoe Tondas	Buffalo, NY/Glencoe, ON	1973	1974	Folded
Chatham Maroons	Chatham, Ontario	1968	1976	Joined WJBHL
Collingwood Blues	Collingwood, Ontario	1976	1977	Joined MOJCHL
Detroit Jr. Red Wings	Detroit, Michigan	1970	1974	Joined NAHL
Guelph Biltmore Mad Hatters	Guelph, Ontario	1972	1975	Became Platers
Guelph CMC's	Guelph, Ontario	1970	1972	Became Mad Hatters
Guelph Imperials/Beef Kings	Guelph, Ontario	1968	1970	Merged w/ CMC's
Guelph Platers	Guelph, Ontario	1975	1977	Joined OPJHL
Hamilton Mountain A's	Hamilton, Ontario	1975	1977	Joined OPJHL
Michigan Americans	Utica, Michigan	1973	1974	Folded
Niagara Falls Flyers	Niagara Falls, Ontario	1972	1976	Folded
Owen Sound Greys	Owen Sound, Ontario	1975	1977	Joined MWJHL
St. Thomas Elgins	St. Thomas, Ontario	1968	1973	Merged w/ Colonels
Sarnia Bees	Sarnia, Ontario	1971	1972	Joined WJBHL
Sarnia Legionnaires	Sarnia, Ontario	1968	1970	Folded
Welland Sabres	Welland, Ontario	1970	1976	Folded
Windsor Spitfires	Windsor, Ontario	1971	1975	Joined OMJHL

== Jack Oakes Memorial Trophy Playoff Champions ==
Frank L. Buckland Trophy - OHA Championship, competed for by SOJHL champion from 1971 until 1977. Won in 1971, 1972, 1973, 1975, and 1976.

Year	Champion	Finalist
1969	St. Thomas Barons	Brantford Foresters
1970	Chatham Maroons	Brantford Foresters
1971	Detroit Jr. Red Wings	Guelph CMC's
1972	Guelph CMC's	Detroit Jr. Red Wings
1973	Chatham Maroons	Guelph Biltmore Mad Hatters
1974	Windsor Spitfires	Chatham Maroons
1975	Guelph Biltmore Mad Hatters	Windsor Spitfires
1976	Guelph Platers	Chatham Maroons
1977	Guelph Platers	Collingwood Blues

=== Western Junior "B" Champions ===
1968 Sarnia Legionnaires
1967 St. Thomas Barons
1966 Sarnia Legionnaires
1965 London Nationals
1964 London Nationals
1963 St. Marys Lincolns
1962 St. Thomas Barons
1961 St. Marys Lincolns
1960 St. Marys Lincolns
1959 Sarnia Legionnaires
1958 Sarnia Legionnaires
1957 Sarnia Legionnaires
1956 Simcoe Gunners
1955 Seaforth Baldwins
1954 Seaforth Baldwins
1953 Seaforth Baldwins
1952 London Lou Ball
1951 Sarnia Jr. Sailors

== Eastern Centennial Cup semi-final champions ==
Year	Champion	Finalist	Host
1971	Detroit Jr. Red Wings	Ottawa M&W Rangers (CJHL)	--
1972	Guelph CMC's	Thunder Bay Vulcans (TBJHL)	--
1975	Guelph Biltmore Mad Hatters	Thunder Bay Case Eagles (TBJHL)	--

== Centennial Cup champions ==
Year / Champion / Finalist / Host; 1972 / Guelph CMC's / Red Deer Rustlers (AJHL) / --

== See also ==
- Ontario Hockey Association
- Ontario Hockey League
- Ontario Provincial Junior A Hockey League
- Centennial Cup
- Dudley Hewitt Cup
- List of ice hockey leagues
