= 1977 Centennial Cup =

1977 Manitoba Centennial Cup
Tournament details
- Venue: Prince Albert, Saskatchewan
- Dates: May 1977
- Teams: 2

Final positions
- Champions: Prince Albert Raiders (1st title)
- Runners-up: Pembroke Lumber Kings

Tournament statistics
- Games played: 4
- Scoring leader(s): Barry Archibald & Al Moore (Prince Albert)

Awards
- MVP: Barry Archibald (Prince Albert)

The 1977 Centennial Cup is the seventh Tier II Junior "A" 1977 ice hockey National Championship for the Canadian Junior A Hockey League.

The Centennial Cup was competed for by the winners of the Western Canadian Champions and the Eastern Canadian Champions.

The finals were hosted by the Prince Albert Raiders in the city of Prince Albert, Saskatchewan.

== The Playoffs ==
Regionals
Sask	Prince Albert Raiders	4
Man	Dauphin Kings	1
Western Canada
BC	Richmond Sockeyes	1
Alta	Calgary Canucks	4
Ont	Pembroke L. Kings	4
Ont	North York Rangers	2
Eastern Canada
PEI	Charlottetown Gens	4
NS	Sydney Millionaires

Semi-finals
Sask	Prince Albert Raiders	4
Alta	Calgary Canucks	1
Ont	Pembroke L. Kings	4
PEI	Charlottetown Generals	0

Finals
Sask	Prince Albert Raiders	4
Ont	Pembroke Lumber Kings	0

Prior to the Regionals

Richmond Sockeyes (PCJHL) defeated Nanaimo Clippers (BCJHL) 3-games-to-none
North York Rangers (OPJHL) defeated Thunder Bay Eagles (TBJHL) 4-games-to-1
Pembroke Lumber Kings (CJHL) defeated La Tuque Wolves (QJAHL) 4-games-to-none
North York Rangers (OPJHL) defeated Guelph Platers (SOJHL) 4-games-to-3
Sydney Millionaires (EJHL) defeated Corner Brook Jr. Royals (WCJHL) 4-games-to-none

=== MCC Finals ===
Centennial Cup Results
Game	Team	Score	Team	Score
1	Prince Albert Raiders	6	Pembroke Lumber Kings	4
2	Prince Albert Raiders	5	Pembroke Lumber Kings	4
3	Prince Albert Raiders	6	Pembroke Lumber Kings	3
4	Prince Albert Raiders	4	Pembroke Lumber Kings	3

== Regional Championships ==
Manitoba Centennial Cup: Prince Albert Raiders

Abbott Cup: Prince Albert Raiders
Eastern Champions: Pembroke Lumber Kings

Doyle Cup: Calgary Canucks
Anavet Cup: Prince Albert Raiders
Dudley Hewitt Cup: Pembroke Lumber Kings
Callaghan Cup: Charlottetown Islanders

== Roll of League Champions ==
AJHL: Calgary Canucks
BCJHL: Nanaimo Clippers
CJHL: Pembroke Lumber Kings
EJHL: Sydney Millionaires
IJHL: Charlottetown Generals
MJHL: Dauphin Kings
NAHA Champions: Corner Brook Jr. Royals
NBJHL:
OPJHL: North York Rangers
PacJHL: Richmond Sockeyes
QJAHL: La Tuque Wolves
SJHL: Prince Albert Raiders
SOJAHL: Guelph Platers
TBJHL: Thunder Bay Eagles

== Awards ==
Most Valuable Player: Barry Archibald (Prince Albert Raiders)
Top Scorer: Barry Archibald and Al Moore (Prince Albert Raiders)

== Related links ==
- Canadian Junior A Hockey League
- Royal Bank Cup
- Anavet Cup
- Doyle Cup
- Dudley Hewitt Cup
- Fred Page Cup
- Abbott Cup
- Mowat Cup
