= 1974 Centennial Cup =

1974 Manitoba Centennial Cup
Tournament details
- Venue: Nepean, Ontario
- Dates: May 1974
- Teams: 2

Final positions
- Champions: Selkirk Steelers (1st title)
- Runners-up: Smiths Falls Bears

Tournament statistics
- Games played: 7

The 1974 Centennial Cup is the fourth Tier II Junior "A" 1974 ice hockey National Championship for the Canadian Junior A Hockey League.

The Centennial Cup was competed for by the winners of the Western Canadian Champions and the Eastern Canadian Champions.

The finals were hosted by the Selkirk Steelers in the city of Nepean, Ontario.

== The Playoffs ==
Regionals
Sask	Prince Albert Raiders	2
Man	Selkirk Steelers	4
Western Canada
BC	Kelowna Buckaroos	4
Alta	Red Deer Rustlers	1
Ont	Wexford Raiders	3
TB	Thunder Bay Herks	4
Eastern Canada
Ont	Smiths Falls Bears	4
PEI	Charlottetown Islanders	1

Semi-finals
Sask	Selkirk Steelers	4
BC	Kelowna Buckaroos	3
Ont	Smiths Falls Bears	4
TB	Thunder Bay Hurricanes	3

Finals
Ont	Smiths Falls Bears	3
Man	Selkirk Steelers	4

Prior to Regionals

Wexford Raiders (OPJHL) defeated Windsor Spitfires (SOJHL) 4-games-to-3
Smiths Falls Bears (CJHL) defeated Lac Megantic Royals (QJAHL) 4-games-to-none
Charlottetown Islanders (IJHL) defeated Moncton Hawks (NBJHL) 3-games-to-2

=== MCC Finals ===
Centennial Cup Results
Game	Team	Score	Team	Score
1	Selkirk Steelers	5	Smiths Falls Bears	4
2	Selkirk Steelers	7	Smiths Falls Bears	4
3	Selkirk Steelers	0	Smiths Falls Bears	3
4	Selkirk Steelers	2	Smiths Falls Bears	1
5	Selkirk Steelers	4	Smiths Falls Bears	6
6	Selkirk Steelers	4	Smiths Falls Bears	5 OT
7	Selkirk Steelers	1	Smiths Falls Bears	0 OT

== Regional Championships ==
Manitoba Centennial Cup: Selkirk Steelers

Abbott Cup: Selkirk Steelers
Eastern Champions: Smiths Falls Bears

Doyle Cup: Kelowna Buckaroos
Anavet Cup: Selkirk Steelers
Dudley Hewitt Cup: Wexford Raiders
Callaghan Cup: Smiths Falls Bears

== Roll of League Champions ==
AJHL: Red Deer Rustlers
BCJHL: Kelowna Buckaroos
CJHL: Smiths Falls Bears
IJHL: Charlottetown Colonels
MJHL: Selkirk Steelers
NBJHL: Moncton Hawks
NJAHL: Gander Jr. Flyers
OPJHL: Wexford Raiders
QJAHL: Lac Megantic Royals
SJHL: Prince Albert Raiders
SOJAHL: Windsor Spitfires
TBJHL: Thunder Bay Hurricanes

== See also ==
- Canadian Junior A Hockey League
- Royal Bank Cup
- Anavet Cup
- Doyle Cup
- Dudley Hewitt Cup
- Fred Page Cup
- Abbott Cup
- Mowat Cup
