= 1976 Centennial Cup =

1976 Manitoba Centennial Cup
Tournament details
- Venue(s): Rockland, Ontario, Canada
- Dates: May 1976
- Teams: 2

Final positions
- Champions: Rockland Nationals (1st title)
- Runners-up: Spruce Grove Mets

Tournament statistics
- Games played: 5

Awards
- MVP: Gerry Leroux (Rockland)

The 1976 Centennial Cup is the sixth Tier II Junior "A" 1976 ice hockey National Championship for the Canadian Junior A Hockey League.

The Centennial Cup was competed for by the winners of the Western Canadian Champions and the Eastern Canadian Champions.

The finals were hosted by the Rockland Nationals in the city of Rockland, Ontario.

== The Playoffs ==
Regionals
Sask | Prince Albert Raiders | 4
Man | Selkirk Steelers | 1
Western Canada
BC | Nor Wes Caps | 1
Alta | Spruce Grove Mets | 4
Ont | Rockland Nationals | 4
Ont | Guelph Platers | 3
Eastern Canada
PEI | Charlottetown Cols | 4
NS | Sydney Millionaires | 1

Semi-finals
Sask | Prince Albert Raiders | 1
Alta | Spruce Grove Mets | 4
Ont | Rockland Nationals | 4
PEI | Charlottetown Colonels | 0

Finals
Ont | Rockland Nationals | 4
Alta | Spruce Grove Mets | 1

Prior to the Regionals

Rockland Nationals (CJHL) defeated Lac Megantic Royals (QJAHL) 4-games-to-1
Charlottetown Colonels (IJHL) defeated St. John's (NLJHL) 4-games-to-2
Guelph Platers (SOJHL) defeated Thunder Bay Eagles (TBJHL) 4-games-to-1
Guelph Platers (SOJHL) defeated North Bay Trappers (OPJHL) 4-games-to-1

=== MCC Finals ===
Centennial Cup Results
| Game | Team | Score | Team | Score |
|---|---|---|---|---|
| 1 | Rockland Nationals | 9 | Spruce Grove Mets | 4 |
| 2 | Rockland Nationals | 7 | Spruce Grove Mets | 1 |
| 3 | Rockland Nationals | 5 | Spruce Grove Mets | 3 |
| 4 | Rockland Nationals | 3 | Spruce Grove Mets | 4 |
| 5 | Rockland Nationals | 7 | Spruce Grove Mets | 3 |

== Regional Championships ==
Manitoba Centennial Cup: Rockland Nationals

Abbott Cup: Spruce Grove Mets
Eastern Champions: Pembroke Lumber Kings

Doyle Cup: Spruce Grove Mets
Anavet Cup: Selkirk Steelers
Dudley Hewitt Cup: Rockland Nationals
Callaghan Cup: Charlottetown Islanders

== Roll of League Champions ==
AJHL: Spruce Grove Mets
BCJHL: Nanaimo Clippers
CJHL: Rockland Nationals
EJHL: Sydney Millionaires
IJHL: Charlottetown Colonels
MJHL: Selkirk Steelers
NBJHL: St. John 77's
OPJHL: North Bay Trappers
PacJHL: Nor Wes Caps
QJAHL: Lac-Megantic Royals
SJHL: Prince Albert Raiders
SOJAHL: Guelph Platers
TBJHL: Thunder Bay Eagles

== Awards ==
Most Valuable Player: Gerry Leroux (Rockland Nationals)

== See also ==
- Canadian Junior A Hockey League
- Royal Bank Cup
- Anavet Cup
- Doyle Cup
- Dudley Hewitt Cup
- Fred Page Cup
- Abbott Cup
- Mowat Cup
