= 1978 Centennial Cup =

1978 Manitoba Centennial Cup
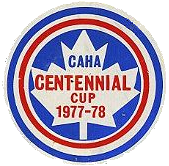

Tournament details
- Venue: Guelph, Ontario
- Dates: May 1978
- Teams: 2

Final positions
- Champions: Guelph Platers (2nd title)
- Runners-up: Prince Albert Raiders

Tournament statistics
- Games played: 4

Awards
- MVP: Terry Cullen (Guelph)

The 1978 Centennial Cup is the eighth Tier II Junior "A" 1978 ice hockey National Championship for the Canadian Junior A Hockey League.

The Centennial Cup was competed for by the winners of the Abbott Cup/Western Canadian Champions and the Eastern Canadian Jr. A Champions.

The finals were hosted by the Guelph Platers in the city of Guelph, Ontario.

== The Playoffs ==
Regionals
Sask	Prince Albert Raiders	4
Man	Kildonan North Stars	0
Western Canada
BC	Merritt Centennials	4
Alta	Calgary Canucks	2
Ont	Guelph Platers	4
CJHL	Pembroke Lumber Kings	1
Eastern Canada
PEI	Charlottetown Eagles	4
NS	Cole Harbour Colts	0

Semi-finals
Sask	Prince Albert Raiders	4
BC	Merritt Centennials	1
Ont	Guelph Platers	4
PEI	Charlottetown Eagles	2

Finals
Sask	Prince Albert Raiders	0
Ont	Guelph Platers	4

Prior to the Regionals

Merritt Centennials (BCJHL) defeated Richmond Sockeyes (PCJHL) 3-games-to-none
Guelph Platers (OPJHL) defeated Degagne Hurricanes (TBJHL) 4-games-to-none
Pembroke Lumber Kings (CJHL) defeated Thetford Mines Fleur de Lys (QJAHL) 4-games-to-none
New Waterford (EJHL) was eliminated in Regionals

=== MCC Finals ===
Centennial Cup Results
Game	Team	Score	Team	Score
1	Guelph Platers	7	Prince Albert Raiders	2
2	Guelph Platers	6	Prince Albert Raiders	2
3	Guelph Platers	6	Prince Albert Raiders	3
4	Guelph Platers	8	Prince Albert Raiders	2

== Regional Championships ==
Manitoba Centennial Cup: Guelph Platers

Abbott Cup: Prince Albert Raiders
Eastern Champions: Guelph Platers

Doyle Cup: Merritt Centennials
Anavet Cup: Prince Albert Raiders
Dudley Hewitt Cup: Guelph Platers
Callaghan Cup: Charlottetown Islanders

== Awards ==
Most Valuable Player: Terry Cullen (Guelph Platers)

=== All-Star Team ===
Forward

Terry Cullen (Guelph Platers)
George McPhee (Guelph Platers)
Brad Tippett(Prince Albert Raiders)

Defence

Brian McLellan (Guelph Platers)
Jim Wilson (Guelph Platers)

Goal

Brian Hayward (Guelph Platers)

== Roll of League Champions ==
AJHL: Calgary Canucks
BCJHL: Nanaimo Clippers
CJHL: Pembroke Lumber Kings
EJHL: New Waterford Jets
IJHL: Charlottetown Eagles
MJHL: Kildonan North Stars
MVJHL: Cole Harbour Colts
NBJHL: Fredericton Red Wings
OPJHL: Guelph Platers
PacJHL: Richmond Sockeyes
QJAHL: Thetford Mines Fleur de Lys
SJHL: Prince Albert Raiders
TBJHL: Degagne Hurricanes

== See also ==
- Canadian Junior A Hockey League
- Royal Bank Cup
- Anavet Cup
- Doyle Cup
- Dudley Hewitt Cup
- Fred Page Cup
- Abbott Cup
- Mowat Cup
