= J. Pius Callaghan Cup =

Canadian ice hockey award

The J. Pius Callaghan Cup is a trophy that was formerly given to the ice hockey Junior A Champion of Atlantic Canada from 1981 until 1991. The trophy is named for Joseph Pius Callaghan, sports writer for the Charlottetown Guardian, school teacher, and sports executive, by Hockey PEI. From 1991 until 2006, the trophy was awarded to the playoff champion of the Maritime Junior A Hockey League. In 2006 it was retired and now resides in the Charlottetown Civic Centre. Prior to 1981, the championship was just called the Atlantic Junior A Championship.

== History ==
First awarded in 1981, the Callaghan Cup was awarded to the top team to play in Nova Scotia, New Brunswick, Prince Edward Island, or Newfoundland and Labrador. Prior to this, the championship was just known as the Atlantic Junior A Championship.

Depending on the year, the Callaghan Cup was the quarter-final of the Manitoba Centennial Cup National Championship and the winner would play the Central Champions for the Dudley Hewitt Cup Eastern Canada Championship. Eventually, as Maritime hockey became less prominent, the Dudley Hewitt Cup went to the Central Champion only.

By 1991, all Maritime leagues had amalgamated into the Maritime Junior A Hockey League and the St. John's Junior Hockey League dropped down to Jr. B play. The Canadian Amateur Hockey Association gave the MJAHL custody over the Callaghan Cup as its playoff championship.

In 2006, the Maritime Junior A Hockey League retired the trophy and replaced it with the Kent Cup.

Prior to the MJAHL taking control of the trophy, the Callaghan Cup/Atlantic Championship was won by a Prince Edward Island team 9 times, a Nova Scotia team 8 times, New Brunswick 3 times, and Newfoundland and Labrador once.

Since 1995, the Atlantic Region, Ottawa District of Ontario and the Quebec champions all compete together for a spot at the Royal Bank Cup through the Fred Page Cup.

== Leagues in competition ==
- Eastern Junior A Hockey League
- Island Junior Hockey League
- Maritime Junior A Hockey League (1968–1971)
- Metro Valley Junior Hockey League
- New Brunswick Junior Hockey League
- Newfoundland Junior A Hockey League
- St. John's Junior Hockey League

== Champions ==
Atlantic Canada Junior A Champions
Year	Champions	Runners-Up	Series/Host
Atlantic Junior A Championship
1971	Charlottetown Islanders (MJAHL)	Moncton Beavers (NBJHL)	4-0
1972	Charlottetown Islanders (Independent)	Moncton Beavers (NBJHL)	4-1
1973	Moncton Beavers (NBJHL)	Buchans Miners (NJAHL)	3-0
1974	Charlottetown Colonels (IJHL)	Moncton Beavers (NBJHL)	3-2
1975	Gander Jr. Flyers (NJAHL)	Charlottetown Colonels (IJHL)	3-0
1976	Charlottetown Colonels (IJHL)	Sydney Millionaires (EJAHL)	4-1
1977	Charlottetown Generals (IJHL)	Sydney Millionaires (EJAHL)	4-0
1978	Charlottetown Eagles (IJHL)	Cole Harbour Colts (MVJHL)	4-0
1979	Sherwood-Parkdale Metros (IJHL)	Halifax Lions (MVJHL)	4-3
1980	Sherwood-Parkdale Metros (IJHL)	Cole Harbour Colts (MVJHL)	4-2
Callaghan Cup
1981	Cole Harbour Colts (MVJHL)	Sherwood-Parkdale Metros (IJHL)	4-2
1982	Moncton Hawks (NBJHL)	North River North Stars (IJHL)	4-2
1983	Halifax Lions (MVJHL)	Sherwood-Parkdale Metros (IJHL)	4-1
1984	Halifax Lions (MVJHL)	Summerside Western Capitals (IJHL)	4-1
1985	Cole Harbour Colts* (MVJHL)	Charlottetown Eagles (IJHL)	4-2
1986	Moncton Hawks* (MVJHL)	Summerside Western Capitals (IJHL)
1987	Dartmouth Fuel Kids (MVJHL)	Charlottetown Abbies (IJHL)	4-1
1988	Halifax Lions (MVJHL)	Summerside Western Capitals (IJHL)	4-3
1989	Summerside Western Capitals (IJHL)	Moncton Hawks (MVJHL)	4-1
1990	Amherst Ramblers (MVJHL)	Charlottetown Abbies (IJHL)	4-1
1991	Halifax Canadians (MVJHL)	St. John's Jr. 50's (SJJHL)	4-0
Callaghan Cup permanently given to Maritime Junior A Hockey League
