= 1972 Centennial Cup =

1972 Manitoba Centennial Cup
Tournament details
- Venue: Guelph, Ontario
- Dates: May 1972
- Teams: 2

Final positions
- Champions: Guelph CMC's (1st title)
- Runners-up: Red Deer Rustlers

Tournament statistics
- Games played: 4

The 1972 Centennial Cup is the second Tier II Junior "A" 1972 ice hockey National Championship for the Canadian Junior A Hockey League.

The Centennial Cup was competed for by the winners of the Western Canadian Champions and the Eastern Canadian Champions.

The finals were hosted by the Guelph CMC's in the city of Guelph, Ontario.

== History ==
Guelph CMC's forward Paul Fendley died days after game four of the championship series after hitting his head on the ice during game four. He was the CMC's leading scorer.

== The Playoffs ==
Regionals
Sask	Humboldt Broncos	4
Man	Dauphin Kings
Western Canada
Alta	Red Deer Rustlers	4
BC	Vernon Essos	2
Ont	Guelph CMC's	4
TB	Thunder Bay Vulcans	2
Eastern Canada
PEI	Charlottetown Isles	4
NB	Moncton Hawks	1

Semi-finals
Alta	Red Deer Rustlers	4
Sask	Humboldt Broncos	1
Ont	Guelph CMC's	4
PEI	Charlottetown Islanders	0

Finals
Ont	Guelph CMC's	4
Alta	Red Deer Rustlers	0

Prior to Regionals

Moncton Hawks (NBJHL) defeated St. John's Jr. Capitals (Independent) 3-games-to-1
Thunder Bay Vulcans (TBJHL) defeated Smiths Falls Bears (CJHL) 4-games-to-1
Guelph CMC's (SOJHL) defeated Sault Ste. Marie Greyhounds (NOJHA) 3-games-to-none
St. John's Jr. Capitals (Independent) defeated Gander Jr. Flyers (NJAHL) 2-games-to-1

=== MCC Finals ===
Centennial Cup Results
Game	Team	Score	Team	Score
1	Guelph CMC's	4	Red Deer Rustlers	2
2	Guelph CMC's	3	Red Deer Rustlers	2
3	Guelph CMC's	3	Red Deer Rustlers	1
4	Guelph CMC's	3	Red Deer Rustlers	0

== Regional Championships ==
Abbott Cup: Red Deer Rustlers
Eastern Champions: Guelph CMC's

Doyle Cup: Red Deer Rustlers
Anavet Cup: Humboldt Broncos
Dudley Hewitt Cup: Guelph CMC's
Callaghan Cup: Charlottetown Islanders

== Roll of League Champions ==
AJHL: Red Deer Rustlers
BCJHL: Vernon Essos
CJHL: Smiths Falls Bears
Independent: Charlottetown Isles
MJHL: Dauphin Kings
NBJHL: Moncton Hawks
NJAHL: Gander Jr. Flyers
NOJHA: Sault Ste. Marie Greyhounds
SJHL: Humboldt Broncos
SOJAHL: Guelph CMC's
TBJHL: Thunder Bay Vulcans

== See also ==
- Canadian Junior A Hockey League
- Royal Bank Cup
- Anavet Cup
- Doyle Cup
- Dudley Hewitt Cup
- Fred Page Cup
- Abbott Cup
- Mowat Cup
