= 1971 Centennial Cup =

1971 Manitoba Centennial Cup
Tournament details
- Venue: Charlottetown, Prince Edward Island
- Dates: May 1971
- Teams: 2

Final positions
- Champions: Red Deer Rustlers (1st title)
- Runners-up: Charlottetown Islanders

Tournament statistics
- Games played: 6

The 1971 Centennial Cup is the first Tier II Junior "A" 1971 ice hockey National Championship for the Canadian Junior A Hockey League.

The Centennial Cup was competed for by the winners of the Western Canadian Champions and the Eastern Canadian Champions.

The finals were hosted by the Charlottetown Islanders in the city of Charlottetown, Prince Edward Island.

The Manitoba Centennial Trophy was presented to the Canadian Amateur Hockey Association (CAHA) by the Manitoba Amateur Hockey Association to commemorate their centennial year of 1970.

== The Playoffs ==
Regionals
Sask	Weyburn Red Wings	2
Man	St. Boniface Saints	4
Western Canada
Alta	Red Deer Rustlers	4
BC	Penticton Broncos	3
Ont	Detroit Jr. Red Wings	4
Ont	Ottawa M&W Rangers	2
Eastern Canada
PEI	Charlottetown Isles	4
TB	Thunder Bay Marrs	1

Semi-finals
Alta	Red Deer Rustlers	4
Man	St. Boniface Saints	0
Ont	Detroit Jr. Red Wings	2
PEI	Charlottetown Isles	4

Finals
Alta	Red Deer Rustlers	4
PEI	Charlottetown Isles	2

Prior to Regionals

Thunder Bay Marrs (TBJHL) defeated Sudbury Wolves (NOJHA) 4-games-to-3
Charlottetown Islanders (MarJHL) defeated Moncton Hawks (NBJHL) 4-games-to-none

=== MCC Finals ===
Centennial Cup Results
Game	Team	Score	Team	Score
1	Charlottetown Islanders	3	Red Deer Rustlers	6
2	Charlottetown Islanders	3	Red Deer Rustlers	7
3	Charlottetown Islanders	6	Red Deer Rustlers	4
4	Charlottetown Islanders	4	Red Deer Rustlers	7
5	Charlottetown Islanders	7	Red Deer Rustlers	2
6	Charlottetown Islanders	4	Red Deer Rustlers	7

== Regional Championships ==
Abbott Cup: Red Deer Rustlers
Dudley Hewitt Cup: Charlottetown Islanders
Doyle Cup: Red Deer Rustlers
Anavet Cup: St. Boniface Saints

== Roll of League Champions ==
AJHL: Red Deer Rustlers
BCJHL: Victoria Cougars
CJHL: Ottawa M&W Rangers
MJHL: St. Boniface Saints
MarJHL: Charlottetown Isles
NBJHL: Moncton Hawks
NOJHA: Sudbury Wolves
SJHL: Weyburn Red Wings
SOJAHL: Detroit Jr. Red Wings
TBJHL: Thunder Bay Marrs

== See also ==
- Canadian Junior A Hockey League
- Royal Bank Cup
- Anavet Cup
- Doyle Cup
- Dudley Hewitt Cup
- Fred Page Cup
- Abbott Cup
- Mowat Cup
