= 1999 Royal Bank Cup =

Tournament details
- Venue(s): Yorkton, Saskatchewan
- Dates: 1–9 May 1999
- Teams: 5

Final positions
- Champions: Vernon Vipers (4th title)
- Runners-up: Charlottetown Abbies

Tournament statistics
- Games played: 13
- Scoring leader: William Hubloo (Charlottetown)

Awards
- MVP: Dennis Bassett (Yorkton)

The 1999 Royal Bank Cup is the 29th Junior "A" 1999 ice hockey National Championship for the Canadian Junior A Hockey League.

The Royal Bank Cup was competed for by the winners of the Doyle Cup, Anavet Cup, Dudley Hewitt Cup, the Fred Page Cup and a host city.

The tournament was hosted by the Yorkton Terriers and Yorkton, Saskatchewan.

== The playoffs ==
=== Round robin ===
| Pos | League (Ticket) | Team | Pld | W | L | GF | GA | GD | Qualification |
|---|---|---|---|---|---|---|---|---|---|
| 1 | OPJHL (Dudley Hewitt Cup) | Bramalea Blues | 4 | 3 | 1 | 14 | 11 | +3 | Semi-final |
| 2 | SJHL (Host) | Yorkton Terriers | 4 | 3 | 1 | 12 | 8 | +4 | Semi-final |
| 3 | MJAHL (Fred Page Cup) | Charlottetown Abbies | 4 | 2 | 2 | 16 | 13 | +3 | Semi-final |
| 4 | BCHL (Doyle Cup) | Vernon Vipers | 4 | 1 | 3 | 11 | 15 | −4 | Semi-final |
| 5 | SJHL (Anavet Cup) | Estevan Bruins | 4 | 1 | 3 | 11 | 17 | −6 | |

==== Results ====
Yorkton Terries defeat Estevan Bruins 6–1
Bramalea Blues defeat Vernon Vipers 4–2
Yorkton Terries defeat Charlottetown Abbies 2–1
Bramalea Blues defeat Estevan Bruins 4–3
Charlottetown Abbies defeat Vernon Vipers 6–5
Yorkton Terriers defeat Vernon Vipers 3–1
Estevan Bruins defeat Charlottetown Abbies 5–4
Bramalea Blues defeat Yorkton Terriers 5–1
Charlottetown Abbies defeat Bramalea Blues 5–1
Vernon Vipers defeat Estevan Bruins 3–2 for the Abbott Cup

=== Semi-finals and Final ===
Semi-finals
1 | Bramalea Blues | 2
4 | Vernon Vipers | 3
2 | Yorkton Terriers | 5
3 | Charlottetown Abbies | 6

Royal Bank Cup Finals
3 | Charlottetown Abbies | 3
4 | Vernon Vipers | 9

Note: Charlottetown defeated Yorkton in Double Overtime.

== Awards ==
Most Valuable Player: Dennis Bassett (Yorkton Terriers)
Top Scorer: William Hubloo (Charlottetown Abbies)
Most Sportsmanlike Player: Anthony Aquino (Bramalea Blues)
Top Goalie: Dennis Bassett (Yorkton Terriers)
Top forward: Kyle Amyotte (Bramalea Blues)
Top Defenceman: John Bradley (Vernon Vipers)

== Roll of League Champions ==
AJHL: Calgary Canucks
BCHL: Vernon Vipers
CJHL: Hawkesbury Hawks
MJHL: OCN Blizzard
MJAHL: Charlottetown Abbies
NOJHL: Rayside-Balfour Sabrecats
OPJHL: Bramalea Blues
QJAAAHL: Valleyfield Braves
RMJHL: Kimberley Dynamiters
SJHL: Estevan Bruins

== See also ==
- Canadian Junior A Hockey League
- Royal Bank Cup
- Anavet Cup
- Doyle Cup
- Dudley Hewitt Cup
- Fred Page Cup
- Abbott Cup
- Mowat Cup
