= 2011 Royal Bank Cup =

Ice hockey

Tournament details
- Venue: Edgeworth Centre in Camrose, Alberta
- Dates: May 1, 2011 – May 8, 2011
- Teams: 5

Final positions
- Champions: Pembroke Lumber Kings (1st title)
- Runners-up: Vernon Vipers

Tournament statistics
- Games played: 13
- Scoring leader: Jonathan Milley (9 pts.) (Pembroke)

Awards
- MVP: Dalyn Flette (Vernon)

The 2011 Royal Bank Cup was the 41st Junior "A" 2011 ice hockey National Championship for the Canadian Junior Hockey League. The 2011 Royal Bank Cup marked the 41st consecutive year a national championship has been awarded to this skill level since the breakaway of Major Junior hockey in 1970.

The Royal Bank Cup was competed for by the winners of the Doyle Cup, Anavet Cup, Dudley Hewitt Cup, the Fred Page Cup and the host city, the Camrose Kodiaks of the Alberta Junior Hockey League.

The tournament was hosted by the Camrose Kodiaks from April 30 to May 8, 2011, with all games played at the Edgeworth Centre in Camrose, Alberta.

After going a dismal 1 win and 3 losses in the round robin, the Pembroke Lumber Kings defeated the 3-1 hosts Camrose Kodiaks by a score of 4–2 to make their first ever final since the beginning of the round robin format. In the final, the Lumber Kings drew the 2-time running National Champion Vernon Vipers who were 5-0 thus far in the tournament. At the end of the first, Vernon outshot Pembroke 15-5 but the score was 0-0. After the second, Pembroke led in shots 15-11 and yet the score was still 0-0. In the third, Pembroke's Jonathan Milley scored on a clear-cut breakaway to take the lead. Milley scored a late empty-netter to clinch the game. Pembroke's Francis Dupuis stopped 40 shots for the shutout win. Pembroke's victory is the first for any member of the Central Canada Hockey League since the Rockland Nationals won the 1976 Centennial Cup.

== Teams ==
- Camrose Kodiaks (Host)

Regular Season: 32-22-0-6 (7th Overall in AJHL)
Playoffs: Defeated Drumheller Dragons 3-1, Defeated Brooks Bandits 4-3, Defeated Okotoks Oilers 4-3, Lost to Spruce Grove Saints 1-4.

- Vernon Vipers (Pacific)

Regular Season: 36-11-4-9 (2nd Overall in BCHL)
Playoffs: Defeated Westside Warriors 4-2, Defeated Salmon Arm Silverbacks 4-2, Defeated Powell River Kings 4-0, Defeated Spruce Grove Saints 4-3 for Doyle Cup.

- Portage Terriers (West)

Regular Season: 40-15-0-7 (1st Overall in MJHL)
Playoffs: Defeated Swan Valley Stampeders 4-2, Defeated Dauphin Kings 4-2, Defeated Selkirk Steelers 4-1, Defeated La Ronge Ice Wolves 4-3 for Anavet Cup.

- Wellington Dukes (Central)

Regular Season: 38-7-2-3 (2nd Overall in OJHL)
Playoffs: Defeated Upper Canada Patriots 4-0, Defeated Villanova Knights 4-1, Defeated Stouffville Spirit 4-2, Defeated Oakville Blades 4-1, Won Dudley Hewitt Cup (4-1).

- Pembroke Lumber Kings (East)

Regular Season: 51-9-0-2 (1st Overall in CCHL)
Playoffs: Defeated Smiths Falls Bears 4-0, Defeated Gloucester Rangers 4-0, Defeated Cornwall Colts 4-2, Won Fred Page Cup (3-1).

== Tournament ==
=== Round Robin ===
Rank	Team	League	Ticket	Pld	W	L	GF	GA
1	x-Vernon Vipers	BCHL	Doyle Cup	4	4	0	19	9
2	x-Camrose Kodiaks	AJHL	Host	4	3	1	11	9
3	x-Pembroke Lumber Kings	CCHL	Fred Page Cup	4	1	3	11	14
4	x-Wellington Dukes	OJHL	Dudley Hewitt Cup	4	1	3	12	16
5	Portage Terriers	MJHL	Anavet Cup	4	1	3	12	17

(x-) denotes Semi-final berth.

==== Results ====
All games at the Edgeworth Centre in Camrose, Alta.

Game	Home team	Score	Away team	Score	Notes
Saturday, April 30, 2011
1	Camrose Kodiaks	2	Vernon Vipers	4	Final - Shots: 31-23 Ver
Sunday, May 1, 2011
2	Portage Terriers	5	Pembroke Lumber Kings	2	Final - Shots: 31-22 Pem
3	Wellington Dukes	2	Camrose Kodiaks	3	Final - Shots: 44-27 Wel
Monday, May 2, 2011
4	Portage Terriers	2	Vernon Vipers	5	Final - Shots: 25-17 Ver
5	Pembroke Lumber Kings	5	Wellington Dukes	2	Final - Shots: 30-22 Wel
Tuesday, May 3, 2011
6	Camrose Kodiaks	4	Portage Terriers	2	Final - Shots: 25-22 Cam
Wednesday, May 4, 2011
7	Vernon Vipers	5	Wellington Dukes	2	Final - Shots: 46-26 Ver
8	Pembroke Lumber Kings	1	Camrose Kodiaks	2	Final - Shots: 30-23 Pem
Thursday, May 5, 2011
9	Wellington Dukes	6	Portage Terriers	3	Final - Shots: 40-25 Por
10	Vernon Vipers	5	Pembroke Lumber Kings	3	Final - Shots: 29-28 Pem

=== Semi-final ===
Game	Home team	Score	Away team	Score	Notes
Saturday, May 7, 2011
11	Vernon Vipers	4	Wellington Dukes	1	Final - Shots: 39-23 Ver
12	Camrose Kodiaks	2	Pembroke Lumber Kings	4	Final - Shots: 34-27 Pem

=== Final ===
Game	Home team	Score	Away team	Score	Notes
Sunday, May 8, 2011
13	Vernon Vipers	0	Pembroke Lumber Kings	2	Final - Shots: 40-23 Ver

== Awards ==
Roland Mercier Trophy (Tournament MVP): Dalyn Flette (Camrose Kodiaks)
Top Forward: Matthew Peca (Pembroke Lumber Kings)
Top Defencemen: Adam Thompson (Vernon Vipers)
Top Goaltender: Dalyn Flette (Camrose Kodiaks)
Tubby Smaltz Trophy (Sportsmanship): Dylan Walchuk (Vernon Vipers)

== Roll of League Champions ==
AJHL: Spruce Grove Saints
BCHL: Vernon Vipers
CCHL: Pembroke Lumber Kings
MHL: Summerside Western Capitals
MJHL: Portage Terriers
NOJHL: Soo Eagles
OJHL: Wellington Dukes
QJAAAHL: Longueuil College Francais
SJHL: La Ronge Ice Wolves
SIJHL: Wisconsin Wilderness

== See also ==
- Canadian Junior A Hockey League
- Royal Bank Cup
- Anavet Cup
- Doyle Cup
- Dudley Hewitt Cup
- Fred Page Cup
