= 2003 Royal Bank Cup =

Tournament details
- Venue(s): Charlottetown Civic Centre in Charlottetown, Prince Edward Island
- Dates: May 3, 2003 – May 11, 2003
- Teams: 5

Final positions
- Champions: Humboldt Broncos (1st title)
- Runners-up: Camrose Kodiaks

Tournament statistics
- Games played: 13
- Scoring leader: Josh Podaima (Humboldt)

Awards
- MVP: Craig Olynick (Humboldt)

The 2003 Royal Bank Cup was the 33rd Junior "A" 2003 ice hockey National Championship for the Canadian Junior A Hockey League.

The Royal Bank Cup was competed for by the winners of the Doyle Cup, Anavet Cup, Dudley Hewitt Cup, the Fred Page Cup and a host city.

The tournament was hosted by the Charlottetown Abbies in Charlottetown, Prince Edward Island.

== The playoffs ==
=== Round robin ===
Pos	League (Ticket)	Team	Pld	W	L	GF	GA	GD	Qualification
1	AJHL (Doyle Cup)	Camrose Kodiaks	4	3	1	18	8	+10	Semi-final
2	SJHL (Anavet Cup)	Humboldt Broncos	4	2	2	19	16	+3	Semi-final
3	OPJHL (Dudley Hewitt Cup)	Wellington Dukes	4	2	2	8	13	−5	Semi-final
4	LHJAAAQ (Fred Page Cup)	Lennoxville Cougars	4	2	2	13	17	−4	Semi-final
5	MJAHL (Host)	Charlottetown Abbies	4	1	3	12	16	−4	

==== Results ====
Lennoxville Cougars defeat Charlottetown Abbies 5-4 in Overtime
Humboldt Broncos defeat Wellington Dukes 4-1
Charlottetown Abbies defeat Camrose Kodiaks 3-2
Lennoxville Cougars defeat Humboldt Broncos 5-4 in Overtime
Camrose Kodiaks defeat Wellington Dukes 7-1
Wellington Dukes defeat Charlottetown Abbies 1-0 in Overtime
Camrose Kodiaks defeat Lennoxville Cougars 4-1
Humboldt Broncos defeat Charlottetown Abbies 8-5
Wellington Dukes defeat Lennoxville Cougars 5-2
Camrose Kodiaks defeat Humboldt Broncos 5-3

=== Semi and finals ===
Semi-finals
1	Camrose Kodiaks	2
4	Lennoxville Cougars	1
2	Humboldt Broncos	3
3	Wellington Dukes	2

Royal Bank Cup Finals
1	Camrose Kodiaks	1
2	Humboldt Broncos	3

== Awards ==
Most Valuable Player: Craig Olynick (Humboldt Broncos)
Top Scorer: Josh Podaima (Humboldt Broncos)
Most Sporsmanlike Player: Travis Friedley (Camrose Kodiaks)
Top Goalie: Mike Brodeur (Camrose Kodiaks)
Top Forward: Carl Gagnon (Lennoxville Cougars)
Top Defenceman: Craig Olynick (Humboldt Broncos)

== Roll of League Champions ==
AJHL: Camrose Kodiaks
BCHL: Vernon Vipers
CJHL: Nepean Raiders
MJHL: OCN Blizzard
MJAHL: Charlottetown Abbies
NOJHL: North Bay Skyhawks
OPJHL: Wellington Dukes
QJAAAHL: Lennoxville Cougars
SJHL: Humboldt Broncos
SIJHL: Fort Frances Borderland Thunder

== See also ==
- Canadian Junior A Hockey League
- Royal Bank Cup
- Anavet Cup
- Doyle Cup
- Dudley Hewitt Cup
- Fred Page Cup
