= Al MacAdam =

Canadian ice hockey player

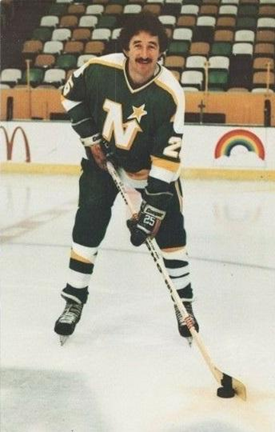
- Born: March 16, 1952 (age 74) Morell, Prince Edward Island, Canada
- Height: 6 ft 0 in (183 cm)
- Weight: 180 lb (82 kg; 12 st 12 lb)
- Position: Right wing
- Shot: Left
- Played for: Philadelphia Flyers; California Golden Seals; Cleveland Barons; Minnesota North Stars; Vancouver Canucks
- National team: Canada
- NHL draft: 55th overall, 1972; Philadelphia Flyers
- Playing career: 1973–1985

Reginald Alan MacAdam (born March 16, 1952) is a Canadian former professional ice hockey player who spent 12 seasons in the National Hockey League (NHL) between 1973 and 1985, and was twice selected to play in the NHL All-Star Game. He is best known for his time with the Minnesota North Stars, where he was one of the franchise's top players in the early 1980s. Most recently MacAdam has served as a scout for the Buffalo Sabres.

== Playing career ==
One of the few players ever drafted out of Canadian university hockey, MacAdam was selected 55th overall by the Philadelphia Flyers in the 1972 NHL Amateur Draft after starring for the University of Prince Edward Island. MacAdam turned pro after the draft and spent most of his first two professional seasons with the Richmond Robins, Philadelphia's American Hockey League (AHL) affiliate. He made his NHL debut in the 1973–74 campaign, appearing in five games for the Flyers without scoring a point. He made his NHL playoff debut in the clinching game of the 1974 Stanley Cup Final as the Flyers won the championship. By virtue of that appearance, he received a Stanley Cup ring for his efforts. However, MacAdam's name was not engraved on the Stanley Cup.

Following the season, MacAdam was dealt to the California Golden Seals in a deal which saw star sniper Reggie Leach going the other way. He was able to step as a regular into a weak Seals lineup, and recorded a fine rookie season in 1974–75 with 18 goals and 43 points. In 1975–76, he emerged as the Seals' top player, leading the team with 32 goals (including 4 shorthanded markers) and 63 points, and played in the 1976 NHL All-Star Game, scoring a goal.

For the 1976–77 season, the Seals moved and became the Cleveland Barons. MacAdam continued to excel, again recording 63 points, and was selected to play in his second consecutive All-Star game. In 1977–78 he was named team captain, but slumped to totals of just 16 goals and 48 points. Over four seasons with the Seals/Barons, MacAdam played every regular-season game and ended as the franchise's all-time leading point scorer.

MacAdam became a member of the Minnesota North Stars in 1978–79 when the hapless Cleveland franchise merged with Minnesota. He had a solid first season with the North Stars, finishing second on the team in scoring with 58 points despite missing 11 games due to injury. One of the league's most durable players, he had not missed a game to that point in his career, and only missed 10 games combined in his other 11 full NHL seasons. During that season, he also forged a solid partnership with rookie centre Bobby Smith, and the two would be regular linemates over the next several seasons.

In 1979–80, MacAdam had his finest NHL campaign, as he posted 42 goals and 51 assists for 93 points, leading the North Stars in all three categories. He finished 12th in overall NHL scoring, and was awarded the Bill Masterton Trophy in 1980 for perseverance and dedication. He was also named Minnesota's MVP and Most Popular Player following the season. Appearing in the playoffs for the first time since 1974, he also led the North Stars in playoff scoring with 16 points in 15 games as they reached the Stanley Cup semi-finals. In the 1980 playoffs, he scored the deciding goal in game seven of the quarterfinals, which eliminated the four-time defending Stanley Cup champion Montreal Canadiens.

MacAdam's production returned to its previous level in 1980–81, as he finished third on the North Stars in scoring with 21 goals and 60 points. However, he had another sterling playoff performance with 19 points in 19 games as Minnesota reached the Stanley Cup Final before losing to the New York Islanders. In 1981–82, he recorded 18 goals and 43 assists for 61 points in what would be his last quality offensive season.

Always a strong defensive player, MacAdam's offensive opportunities were severely reduced after 1982 with the arrival of star rookie Brian Bellows, and he spent the remainder of his career as a third-line checker and defensive forward. His production fell to a career-low 11 goals and 33 points in 1982–83, but he rebounded to record 22 goals for the North Stars in 1983–84.

For the 1984–85 campaign, MacAdam was dealt to the Vancouver Canucks in exchange for future considerations (which later became Harold Snepsts), unhappy about his playing time in Minnesota. He had a solid season with 14 goals and 34 points, but could not meet the expectations of being traded for Snepsts, who was one of the most popular players in Canuck history. He retired shortly after being assigned to the minors at the start of the 1985–86 season.

MacAdam finished his career with 240 goals and 351 assists for 591 points in 864 games, along with 509 penalty minutes. His 591 points was the most for a player from Prince Edward Island, just ahead of Bob MacMillan, although that record was surpassed by Brad Richards of the Dallas Stars in 2010.

During his playing days, MacAdam was also respected as a tough and capable fighter "who many left alone", in the words of Clark Gillies of the New York Islanders.

== Coaching career ==
At the conclusion of his career, MacAdam was appointed head coach and assistant athletic director at St. Thomas University in Fredericton, New Brunswick. He spent 11 years at St. Thomas, and was named AUAA Coach of the Year in 1995–96.

He returned to pro hockey in 1997 to accept a job as head coach of the St. John's Maple Leafs of the American Hockey League in 1997. After three successful seasons there he returned to the NHL in 2000–01, joining the coaching staff of the Chicago Black Hawks under head coach Brian Sutter, and spent four seasons as an assistant coach in Chicago.

After leaving Chicago he was hired as head coach of the Halifax Mooseheads in the Quebec Major Junior Hockey League, and spent two seasons there before retiring after the 2005–06 season. He became a scout for the Buffalo Sabres in 2006. MacAdam currently resides in Prince Edward Island.

== Awards and achievements ==
- Won Stanley Cup with Philadelphia Flyers (1974)
- Played in NHL All-Star Game (1976, 1977)
- Won Bill Masterton Trophy (1980)
- Named California Golden Seals MVP (1975–76)
- Led California Golden Seals in scoring (1975–76)
- Named Minnesota North Stars MVP (1979–80)
- Led Minnesota North Stars in scoring (1979–80)
- Named AUAA Coach of the Year (1995–96)

== Career statistics ==
=== Regular season and playoffs ===
			Regular season					Playoffs
Season	Team	League	GP	G	A	Pts	PIM	GP	G	A	Pts	PIM
1969–70	Charlottetown Islanders	MJrHL	41	23	38	61	55	11	4	7	11	2
1969–70	Charlottetown Islanders	MC	—	—	—	—	—	14	5	6	11	6
1970–71	Charlottetown Islanders	MJrHL	35	19	37	56	22	7	2	3	5	7
1970–71	Charlottetown Islanders	CC	—	—	—	—	—	21	23	19	42	31
1971–72	University of PEI	AIAA	26	32	21	53	8	—	—	—	—	—
1971–72	Charlottetown Islanders	MJrHL	11	15	21	36	—	—	—	—	—	—
1972–73	Richmond Robins	AHL	68	19	32	51	42	4	0	2	2	0
1973–74	Philadelphia Flyers	NHL	5	0	0	0	0	1	0	0	0	0
1973–74	Richmond Robins	AHL	62	23	22	45	36	5	1	4	5	4
1974–75	California Golden Seals	NHL	80	18	25	43	55	—	—	—	—	—
1975–76	California Golden Seals	NHL	80	32	31	63	49	—	—	—	—	—
1976–77	Cleveland Barons	NHL	80	22	41	63	68	—	—	—	—	—
1977–78	Cleveland Barons	NHL	80	16	32	48	42	—	—	—	—	—
1978–79	Minnesota North Stars	NHL	69	24	34	58	30	—	—	—	—	—
1979–80	Minnesota North Stars	NHL	80	42	51	93	24	15	7	9	16	4
1980–81	Minnesota North Stars	NHL	78	21	39	60	94	19	9	10	19	4
1981–82	Minnesota North Stars	NHL	79	18	43	61	37	4	1	0	1	4
1982–83	Minnesota North Stars	NHL	73	11	22	33	60	9	2	1	3	2
1983–84	Minnesota North Stars	NHL	80	22	13	35	23	16	1	4	5	7
1984–85	Vancouver Canucks	NHL	80	14	20	34	27	—	—	—	—	—
1985–86	Fredericton Express	AHL	11	0	4	4	5	—	—	—	—	—
1986–87	Charlottetown Islanders	NBSHL	11	11	11	22	2	—	—	—	—	—
NHL totals			864	240	351	591	509	64	20	24	44	21

=== International ===
Year	Team	Event	GP	G	A	Pts	PIM
1977	Canada	WC	10	4	4	8	0
1979	Canada	WC	8	4	4	8	0
Senior totals			18	8	8	16	0
