= Hilliard Graves =

Canadian ice hockey player

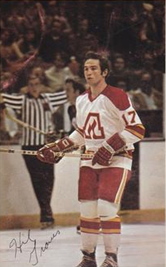
- Born: October 18, 1950 (age 75) Saint John, New Brunswick, Canada
- Height: 5 ft 11 in (180 cm)
- Weight: 175 lb (79 kg; 12 st 7 lb)
- Position: Right wing
- Shot: Right
- Played for: California Golden Seals; Atlanta Flames; Vancouver Canucks; Winnipeg Jets
- NHL draft: Undrafted
- Playing career: 1970–1980

Hilliard Donald Graves (born October 18, 1950) is a Canadian former professional ice hockey player who played 556 games in the National Hockey League. He played for the California Golden Seals, Atlanta Flames, Vancouver Canucks, and Winnipeg Jets. During his career he was known for having a devastating hip check.

== Career statistics ==
=== Regular season and playoffs ===
			Regular season					Playoffs
Season	Team	League	GP	G	A	Pts	PIM	GP	G	A	Pts	PIM
1968–69	Charlottetown Islanders	MJHL	38	16	26	42	69	14	10	13	23	26
1969–70	Charlottetown Islanders	MJHL	42	32	65	97	55	12	8	13	21	11
1970–71	California Golden Seals	NHL	14	0	0	0	0	—	—	—	—	—
1970–71	Providence Reds	AHL	16	3	1	4	11	—	—	—	—	—
1971–72	Baltimore Clippers	AHL	76	14	18	32	67	18	5	4	9	33
1972–73	California Golden Seals	NHL	75	27	25	52	34	—	—	—	—	—
1973–74	California Golden Seals	NHL	64	11	18	29	48	—	—	—	—	—
1974–75	Atlanta Flames	NHL	67	10	19	29	30	—	—	—	—	—
1975–76	Atlanta Flames	NHL	80	19	30	49	16	2	0	0	0	0
1976–77	Atlanta Flames	NHL	25	8	5	13	17	—	—	—	—	—
1976–77	Vancouver Canucks	NHL	54	10	20	30	17	—	—	—	—	—
1977–78	Vancouver Canucks	NHL	80	21	26	47	18	—	—	—	—	—
1978–79	Vancouver Canucks	NHL	62	11	15	26	14	—	—	—	—	—
1978–79	New Brunswick Hawks	AHL	18	8	15	23	22	5	4	5	9	10
1979–80	Winnipeg Jets	NHL	35	1	5	6	15	—	—	—	—	—
1979–80	Tulsa Oilers	CHL	5	2	3	5	2	—	—	—	—	—
1979–80	New Brunswick Hawks	AHL	16	3	6	9	5	17	8	6	14	4
NHL totals			556	118	163	281	209	2	0	0	0	0
