= 2006 Telus Cup =

Tournament details
- Venue: Charlottetown Civic Centre in Charlottetown, PE
- Dates: April 24–30, 2006
- Teams: 6

Final positions
- Champions: Prince Albert Mintos
- Runners-up: Calgary Buffaloes
- Third place: Patriotes de Châteauguay

Tournament statistics
- Scoring leader: Mike Connolly

Awards
- MVP: Mike Connolly

The 2006 Telus Cup was Canada's 28th annual national midget 'AAA' hockey championship, played April 24–30, 2006 at the Charlottetown Civic Centre in Charlottetown, Prince Edward Island. The Prince Albert Mintos went undefeated throughout the tournament to win their first of two consecutive national titles, defeating the Calgary Buffaloes 5–4 in triple overtime in the gold medal game. Future National Hockey League players playing in this tournament included Dustin Tokarski, Yann Sauvé, Jordan Eberle, and Alex Pietrangelo.

== Teams ==
Result	Team	Region	City
1st place, gold medalist(s)	Prince Albert Mintos	West	Prince Albert, SK
2nd place, silver medalist(s)	Calgary Buffaloes	Pacific	Calgary, AB
3rd place, bronze medalist(s)	Patriotes de Châteauguay	Québec	Châteauguay, QC
4	Toronto Jr. Canadiens	Central	Toronto, ON
5	St. John's Maple Leafs	Atlantic	St. John's, NL
6	Charlottetown Islanders	Host	Charlottetown, PE

== Round robin ==
=== Standings ===
Team	Pld	W	L	D	GF	GA	GD	Pts
Prince Albert Mintos	5	5	0	0	26	6	+20	10
Toronto Jr. Canadiens	5	3	2	0	20	15	+5	6
Calgary Buffaloes	5	3	2	0	22	18	+4	6
Patriotes de Châteauguay	5	2	3	0	14	20	−6	4
St. John's Maple Leafs	5	2	3	0	18	25	−7	4
Charlottetown Islanders	5	0	5	0	8	24	−16	0

=== Scores ===
- Châteauguay 6 - St. John's 4
- Prince Albert 7 - Calgary 2
- Toronto 7 - Charlottetown 2
- Prince Albert 5 - Châteauguay 0
- Toronto 5 - Calgary 4
- St. John's 6 - Charlottetown 4
- Toronto 5 - Châteauguay 1
- Prince Albert 6 - St. John's 3
- Calgary 4 - St. John's 1
- St. John's 4 - Toronto 3
- Calgary 6 - Châteauguay 4
- Prince Albert 4 - Charlottetown 1
- Calgary 6 - St. John's 1
- Prince Albert 4 - Toronto 0
- Châteauguay 3 - Charlottetown 0

== Playoffs ==
=== Semi-finals ===
- Prince Albert 8 - Châteauguay 0
- Calgary 3 - Toronto 2

=== Bronze-medal game ===
- Châteauguay 4 - Toronto 3

=== Gold-medal game ===
- Prince Albert 5 - Calgary 4 (3OT)

== Individual awards ==
- Most Valuable Player: Mike Connolly (Calgary)
- Top Scorer: Mike Connolly (Calgary)
- Top Forward: Matthew Robertson (Prince Albert)
- Top Defenceman: Chris Markiewicz (Calgary)
- Top Goaltender: Alan Reynolds (Toronto)
- Most Sportsmanlike Player: Jordan Eberle (Calgary)

== See also ==
- Telus Cup
