= Canadian Junior Hockey League =

Association of Canadian junior A ice hockey leagues

- Countries: Canada, United States
- President: Andy Harkness
- Former names: Canada West Hockey Association (1990–1993); Canadian Junior A Hockey League (1993–2008)
- Founded: 1993; 33 years ago
- Divisions: 9 leagues
- Conferences: 4 regions
- No. of teams: 117
- Championship: Centennial Cup
- Recent champions: Calgary Canucks (AJHL) (2nd)
- Most successful club: Vernon Vipers (BCHL) (6)
- Headquarters: Calgary, Alberta
- Website: www.cjhlhockey.com/en/

The Canadian Junior Hockey League (CJHL) is an association of Canadian junior A ice hockey leagues and teams and was formed in November 1993, emerging from the Canada West Association of Junior 'A' Hockey. The champion of the Canadian Junior Hockey League wins the Centennial Cup.

The CJHL spans the majority of Canada, from the Prairies to the Atlantic Coast. The only regional organizations of Hockey Canada to currently not have member teams or a league are BC Hockey, Hockey Newfoundland and Labrador (Hockey NL), and Hockey North. In addition to BC Hockey, Hockey NL, and Hockey North, Hockey New Brunswick and Hockey PEI do not have their own leagues, but have teams from their region playing under Hockey Nova Scotia within the Maritime Junior Hockey League (MHL).

== History ==
=== 1970s ===
In 1970, the Ontario Major Junior Hockey League, Quebec Major Junior Hockey League, and Western Canada Hockey League broke away from the Canadian Amateur Hockey Association (CAHA) and became its own governing body (what would become the Canadian Hockey League). These new "Major Junior" leagues were given exclusive permission to compete for the Memorial Cup, which had been Canada's Junior "A" championship prior to 1970.

In May 1970, CAHA chairman Frank McKinnon tabled a motion at the organization's Annual General Meeting to allow the remaining Junior "A" leagues to compete at a national level for their own championship. The motion was granted and McKinnon and the Manitoba Amateur Hockey Association donated the Manitoba Centennial Trophy to the new championship in honour of 100 years of ice hockey in Manitoba.

Leagues The leagues that would be involved in that first year were:

- British Columbia Junior Hockey League (BCJHL)
- Alberta Junior Hockey League (AJHL)
- Saskatchewan Amateur Junior Hockey League (SAJHL)
- Manitoba Junior Hockey League (MJHL)
- Southern Ontario Junior A Hockey League (SOJHL)
- Thunder Bay Junior A Hockey League (TBJHL)
- Central Junior A Hockey League (CJHL)
- Northern Ontario Junior Hockey Association (NOJHA)
- Maritime Junior A Hockey League (MJAHL)
- New Brunswick Junior Hockey League (NBJHL)

In 1971, the Newfoundland Amateur Hockey Association jumped on board by allowing their provincial Junior champion to compete in the Centennial Cup playdowns. This lasted until 1977. Also in 1971, the Maritime Junior A Hockey League folded, leaving the Charlottetown Islanders (the defending Dudley Hewitt Cup champions) to enter the Centennial Cup playdowns as an independent team. Also in 1971, the Newfoundland Junior A Hockey League entered the fray. In 1972, the Northern Ontario Junior Hockey Association folded when two of its teams (Sudbury Wolves and Sault Ste. Marie Greyhounds) jumped to Major Junior. The Charlottetown Islanders closed their doors after a marginal performance in the 1972 playdowns. Two new leagues came in 1972, the Ontario Provincial Junior A Hockey League was created as a rival league to the Southern Ontario Junior A Hockey League. The SOJHL was more in Southwestern Ontario, while the OPJHL focused more on the Greater Toronto Area. The other new league was the Quebec Junior A Hockey League.

In 1973, the Island Junior Hockey League of Prince Edward Island made the jump from Junior B to Junior A. In 1975, the Eastern Junior A Hockey League ascended to Junior A from the Junior B ranks in Cape Breton Island. Then, in 1977, the Metro Valley Junior Hockey League jumped from Junior B to Junior A in mainland Nova Scotia. After one year of playing head-to-head for the provincial Junior A title, the EJHL folded and left the MVJHL as the only league in Nova Scotia. After various attempts to create a stable Junior A system in Newfoundland, the NAHA and its teams pulled out of National play in 1977. The Southern Ontario league folded in 1977, the Northern Ontario Junior Hockey League was promoted to Junior A in 1978 and the NorMan Junior Hockey League was promoted to Junior A in Manitoba in 1979. A second league was founded in British Columbia in 1974, the Pacific Coast Junior Hockey League was created to compete with the British Columbia Junior Hockey League - this league was absorbed by the BCJHL in 1979. A year later, the Peace-Cariboo Junior Hockey League was promoted from Junior B in East-Central British Columbia. That same year, the Thunder Bay Junior A Hockey League folded. They were replaced by a single team, the Thunder Bay Kings later to be the two-time Centennial Cup champion Thunder Bay Flyers.

=== 1980s and 1990s ===
The summer of 1982 saw the folding of the Quebec Junior A League. In 1983, the New Brunswick Junior Hockey League folded and merged with the Metro Valley Junior Hockey League. In 1985, the NorMan Junior Hockey League faltered and folded. In 1987, the OPJHL, then known as the Ontario Junior Hockey League, folded after dropping to only four teams. During the 1988 Centennial Cup playoff run, the Black Lake Miners of Quebec were allowed to enter as an independent team. That summer, the Quebec Provincial Junior Hockey League was formed, rebranded the Quebec Junior AAA Hockey League in 1997. In 1989, Newfoundland would take a second shot at Junior A with the promotion of the St. John's Junior Hockey League.

In 1990, the western Junior A leagues in Canada would form the Canada West Association. This organization would be the catalyst for the creation of the Canadian Junior A Hockey League in 1993. In 2008, the league was rebranded the "Canadian Junior Hockey League".

The CJAHL was formed in November 1993, with Fred Page appointed as chairman of the board, and Ronald Boileau as president. The original leagues included:

- British Columbia Hockey League
- Rocky Mountain Junior Hockey League
- Alberta Junior Hockey League
- Saskatchewan Junior Hockey League
- Manitoba Junior Hockey League
- Thunder Bay Flyers (Representative of Hockey Northwestern Ontario)
- Ontario Provincial Junior A Hockey League
- Metro Junior A Hockey League
- Northern Ontario Junior Hockey League
- Central Junior A Hockey League
- Quebec Provincial Junior Hockey League
- Maritime Junior A Hockey League

The St. John's Junior Hockey League dropped back to Junior B in 1991. Also in 1991, the Island Junior Hockey League folded and merged with the Metro Valley league. The Metro Valley League now had all three Maritime provinces incorporated in it and decided to change its name to the Maritime Junior A Hockey League. Out West in 1991, the Peace-Cariboo league expanded south into the Kootenays and rebranded itself as the Rocky Mountain Junior Hockey League. In 1993, Southern Ontario came back in a big way with two leagues—the Ontario Provincial Junior A Hockey League and the Metro Junior A Hockey League. By 1998, the two leagues would merge under the Ontario Provincial banner with 37 teams under its belt. In 1999, the Rocky Mountain Junior Hockey League folded.

=== 2000s to present ===
In 2000, the Thunder Bay Flyers folded, having competed strictly in the United States Hockey League since the 1996–97 season. A year later, their void was filled by the Superior International Junior Hockey League. In 2008, the Ontario Provincial League rebranded itself the Ontario Junior Hockey League, just to be divided into two leagues in 2009 (Central Canadian Hockey League and Ontario Junior A Hockey League), and be reunited in time for playoffs that year under the Ontario Junior Hockey League banner. In 2010, the Central Junior A Hockey League became the Central Canada Hockey League.

In 2018, the CJHL introduced a concussion protocol funded by the Co-operators, for the assessment and management of concussion, and digitally tracking a player's concussion history. The CJHL later developed a player safety committee to implement educational videos for players, and for uniform ice hockey rules in the constituent leagues.

During the COVID-19 pandemic in Canada, the CJHL cancelled the 2019–20 season playoffs for all leagues, the four regional championships, and the national championship. Several return-to-play scenarios were proposed for the 2020–21 season, which included staggered registrations and different opening dates for each league. Due to the pandemic, some leagues in the CJHL played games without spectators in attendance, which greatly reduced league income. The CJHL hoped that the financial assistance given by provincial governments in Alberta and Saskatchewan would be equalled by other provinces. Without national hockey events, some CJHL leagues planned showcases for players to be scouted, and worked with the NHL Central Scouting Bureau to make long-term plans for the NHL entry draft.

The British Columbia Hockey League (BCHL) withdrew from the CJHL prior to the 2021–22 season. The BCHL reportedly sought to import players aged 16 and 17 from other provinces, which was opposed by the remainder of the CJHL. Despite the loss of a league, the other nine league were committed to the CJHL. In 2021, all CJHL leagues agreed to truth and reconciliation games in support of First Nations in Canada. The Dryden Ice Dogs were the first team to arrange such a game.

== Current leagues ==
Member leagues of the CJHL
Pacific Zone
Western Zone
Central Zone
Eastern Zone

| League | Provinces | Teams |
|---|---|---|
Pacific Zone
| Alberta Junior Hockey League (AJHL) | Alberta (Note: One team plays on the Saskatchewan side of Lloydminster, a city bisected by the Alberta–Saskatchewan border.) | 12 |
Western Zone
| Saskatchewan Junior Hockey League (SJHL) | Saskatchewan (Note: One team plays on the Manitoba side of Flin Flon, a city bisected by the Manitoba–Saskatchewan border.) | 12 |
| Manitoba Junior Hockey League (MJHL) | Manitoba | 13 |
Central Zone
| Superior International Junior Hockey League (SIJHL) | Northwestern Ontario (Note: Includes one U.S. team in Ironwood, Michigan.) | 7 |
| Northern Ontario Junior Hockey League (NOJHL) | Northeastern Ontario (Note: Includes one U.S. team in Sault Ste. Marie, Michigan.) | 12 |
| Ontario Junior Hockey League (OJHL) | Southern Ontario (Note: Includes one team in Buffalo, New York.) | 24 |
Eastern Zone
| Central Canada Hockey League (CCHL) | Eastern Ontario | 12 |
| Quebec Junior Hockey League (LHJQ) | Quebec | 13 |
| Maritime Junior Hockey League (MHL) | Atlantic Canada | 12 |

=== Former leagues ===
Former leagues competing within the CJHL:

Atlantic Canada

- Eastern Junior A Hockey League
- Island Junior Hockey League
- Maritime Junior A Hockey League (1968–1971)
- New Brunswick Junior Hockey League
- Newfoundland Junior A Hockey League
- St. John's Junior Hockey League

Quebec

- Quebec Junior A Hockey League

Ontario

- Metro Junior A Hockey League
- Northern Ontario Junior Hockey Association
- Ontario Provincial Junior A Hockey League (1972–1987)
- Southern Ontario Junior A Hockey League
- Thunder Bay Flyers (USHL)
- Thunder Bay Junior A Hockey League

Manitoba

- NorMan Junior Hockey League

British Columbia

- British Columbia Hockey League
- Pacific Junior A Hockey League
- Rocky Mountain Junior Hockey League

== Administrators ==
Kirk Lamb was named the first full-time chairman and president in 2012. Rick Morocco served as executive director from 2014 to 2016, when he was succeeded by Brent Ladds who became president while Lamb continued as chairman. The CJHL sought to restructure its administration to assist the chairman of the board. Ladds was tasked with overseeing all administration, events, planning and corporate partnerships. Kevin Abrams was appointed chairman in 2017, followed by Robert Mazzuca who was appointed in 2021. Andy Harkness succeeded Ladds as CJHL president on November 7, 2022.

== National playoffs and trophies ==
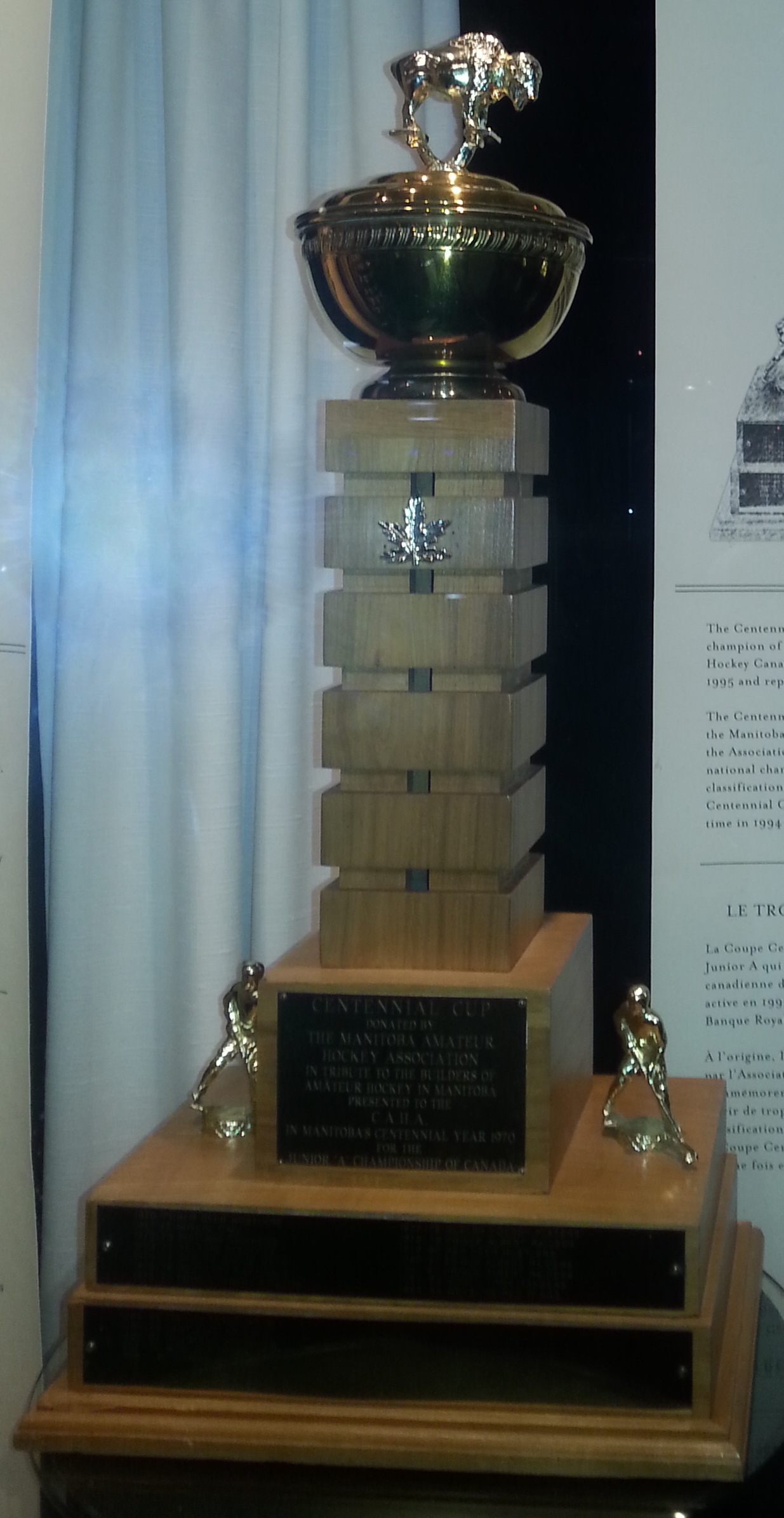
The Centennial Cup (formerly the Royal Bank Cup) is the championship trophy of the Canadian Junior Hockey League.

To determine a National Champion, the winners of each league playdown in three regional championships—the Fred Page Cup (Eastern Region - Maritimes, Quebec, Ottawa District), the Dudley Hewitt Cup (Central Region - Southern Ontario, Northeastern Ontario, Northwestern Ontario), the ANAVET Cup (Western Region - Manitoba and Saskatchewan), and the Doyle Cup (Pacific Region - Alberta and British Columbia). The winners of the four regional playoffs and a host city play in the Centennial Cup national Junior A championship.

There are a variety of trophies no longer used for the national playdown system. The Abbott Cup and Dudley Hewitt Cup were awarded to Western and Eastern Canadian Champions respectively, the winners of which would square off for the Manitoba Centennial Cup, the National Championship. The Abbott Cup was no longer a major trophy after the 1989 Centennial Cup when both the Doyle Cup and ANAVET Cup champions were granted entrance into the Centennial Cup round robin. The western leagues briefly returned to an all-western Canadian championship known as the Western Canada Cup from 2013 to 2017. The Dudley Hewitt Cup became the Central Canada championship after the 1978 Centennial Cup, but might have been awarded to an All-Eastern Champion briefly after 1982. In the early 1990s, the Callaghan Cup was replaced by the Fred Page Cup. The Callaghan Cup was originally awarded to the Atlantic Junior "A" Champion between the winner of Newfoundland, Prince Edward Island, New Brunswick, and Nova Scotia, but after the three major Maritime leagues merged and Newfoundland's final league departed the trophy had no real use. In 1995, the Quebec Provincial Junior Hockey League donated the Fred Page Cup to create an Eastern Canadian championship between the Maritimes, Quebec, and the Ottawa District of Ontario. The Dudley Hewitt Cup used to represent all of Ontario and Quebec, but with so many leagues in that region in the mid-1990s and the MJAHL's champion getting a direct ride to the National Championship, the Fred Page Cup became a necessity.

The Manitoba Centennial Cup was the Grand Championship of Junior "A" hockey in Canada from 1970 until 1995, when it was replaced by the corporately sponsored Royal Bank Cup, later known as the RBC Cup. The sponsorship ended after the 2017–18 season; the championship is once again known as the Centennial Cup.

The 2022 Centennial Cup, presented by Tim Hortons, was played in Estevan, Saskatchewan. It was the first national championship awarded since 2019. The format changed into a 10-team event, which included the host Estevan Bruins, and the nine league champions. The CJHL chose not to have the four regional championships, and gave each league champion a berth in the Centennial Cup.

== CJHL Prospects Game ==

In 2005, the CJAHL created the CJAHL Prospects Game (now called the CJHL Prospects Game) where top players compete in a Team West versus Team East format for the President's Cup in front of the scouting community. In 2006, in conjunction with the Hockey Canada, the World Junior A Challenge was formed. At the WJAC, a prospects team from the five western leagues and the five eastern leagues of the CJHL host national prospect teams from around the world in an international tournament hosted by a town with a CJHL franchise. From 2011 on, the CJHL Prospects Game became an event at the World Junior A Challenge.

The President's Cup is awarded to the winning team at the CJHL Prospects Game. Team East (CHL, MHL, NOJHL, OJHL, and QJAAAHL players) and Team West (AJHL, BCHL, MJHL, SJHL, and SIJHL players) playoff in an annual event for the President's Cup at a predetermined host city in front of scores of fans and scouts. From 2005 until 2008, the event ran as a single game, but starting in 2009 the President's Cup will be played for in a two-game series where the combined score of the games determines the winner of the event.

At the 2011 Royal Bank Cup it was announced that starting with the 2011 World Junior A Challenge that the CJHL Prospects Game would take place at the WJAC. Following the 2013 World Junior A Challenge, the game was reverted to a stand-alone event starting with the 2014–15 season, as well as taking place post-New Years for the first time ever.

Single Game Event

2005 Team West defeated Team East 5-4 in Yorkton, Saskatchewan
2006 Team West defeated Team East 6-2 in Vernon, British Columbia
2007 Team East defeated Team West 5-3 in Winkler, Manitoba
2008 Team East defeated Team West 6-3 in Summerside, Prince Edward Island

Two Game Series

2009 Team West defeated Team East 8-3 (8-1, 0-2) in Winkler, Manitoba
2010 Team East defeated Team West 9-2 (2-1 SO, 7-1) in Dauphin, Manitoba
2011 Team West defeated Team East 9-6 (4-3 OT, 5-3) in Langley, British Columbia at 2011 World Junior A Challenge
2012 Team West defeated Team East 8-6 (5-0, 3-6) in Digby and Yarmouth, Nova Scotia at 2012 World Junior A Challenge
2013 Team East defeated Team West 8-4 (4-2, 4-2) in Digby and Yarmouth, Nova Scotia at 2013 World Junior A Challenge

Single Game Event

2015 Team West defeated Team East 3-2 in Oakville, Ontario
2016 Team East defeated Team West 3-1 in Surrey, British Columbia
2017 Team West defeated Team East 4-3 in Cornwall, Ontario
2018 Team West defeated Team East 5-2 in Mississauga, Ontario
2019 Team West defeated Team East 5-2 in Okotoks, Alberta

== Players ==
=== Professional league draftees ===
This is a list of players per league/independent team drafted since the inception of Junior A in 1970 directly from a Junior A team into the National Hockey League or the World Hockey Association. Any league or independent team with a grey background is defunct. These numbers do not include the hundreds of players who played in the CJHL, moved up to Canadian Hockey League, NCAA, or United States Hockey League and were then drafted.

| League | Seasons | Total |
|---|---|---|
| BCHL | 44 | 143 |
| AJHL | 44 | 79 |
| SJHL | 44 | 47 |
| OJHL | 21 | 39 |
| CCHL | 44 | 31 |
| MJHL | 44 | 18 |
| QJHL | 26 | 2 |
| NOJHL | 36 | 2 |
| MHL | 37 | 2 |
| SIJHL | 13 | 0 |
| OPJHL 72-87 | 15 | 19 |
| SOJHL | 7 | 15 |
| MetJHL | 8 | 9 |
| Thunder Bay Flyers | 20 | 8 |
| MJAHL 70-71 | 1 | 4 |
| TBJHL | 10 | 4 |
| NOJHA | 2 | 3 |
| Charlottetown Islanders | 1 | 2 |
| QJAHL | 10 | 1 |
| RMJHL | 19 | 1 |
| Total | 44 | 429 |

Top 30 Overall Picks from CJHL:

Kyle Turris - 2007 1st Rd - 3rd Overall to Phoenix Coyotes (Burnaby Express BCHL)
Cale Makar - 2017 1st Rd - 4th Overall to Colorado Avalanche (Brooks Bandits AJHL)
Tyson Jost - 2016 1st Rd - 10th Overall to Colorado Avalanche (Penticton Vees BCHL)
Dainius Zubrus - 1996 1st Rd - 15th Overall to Philadelphia Flyers (Caledon Canadians MetJHL)
Joe Colborne - 2008 1st Rd - 16th Overall to Boston Bruins (Camrose Kodiaks AJHL)
Dante Fabbro - 2016 1st Rd - 17th Overall to Nashville Predators (Penticton Vees BCHL)
Travis Zajac - 2004 1st Rd - 20th Overall to New Jersey Devils (Salmon Arm Silverbacks BCHL)
Beau Bennett - 2010 1st Rd - 20th Overall to Pittsburgh Penguins (Penticton Vees BCHL)
Dennis Cholowski - 2016 1st Rd - 20th Overall to Detroit Red Wings (Chilliwack Chiefs BCHL)
Riley Nash - 2007 1st Rd - 21st Overall to Edmonton Oilers (Salmon Arm Silverbacks BCHL)
Kris Chucko - 2004 1st Rd - 24th Overall to Calgary Flames (Salmon Arm Silverbacks BCHL)
Andrew Cogliano - 2005 1st Rd - 25th Overall to Edmonton Oilers (St. Michael's Buzzers OPJHL)
Brendan Smith - 2007 1st Rd - 27th Overall to Detroit Red Wings (St. Michael's Buzzers OPJHL)
Dylan Olsen - 2009 1st Rd - 28th Overall to Chicago Blackhawks (Camrose Kodiaks AJHL)

Top 30 Overall Picks Prior to CJHL:

James Patrick - 1981 1st Rd - 9th Overall to New York Rangers (Prince Albert Raiders SJHL)
Rod Brind'Amour - 1988 1st Rd - 9th Overall to St. Louis Blues (Notre Dame Hounds SJHL)
Jason Marshall - 1989 1st Rd - 9th Overall to St. Louis Blues (Vernon Lakers BCJHL)
John Van Boxmeer - 1972 1st Rd - 14th Overall to Montreal Canadiens (Guelph CMC's SOJHL)
Brent Sutter - 1980 1st Rd - 17th Overall to New York Islanders (Red Deer Rustlers SJHL)
Kent Manderville - 1989 2nd Rd - 24th Overall to Calgary Flames (Notre Dame Hounds SJHL)
Nicolas Perreault - 1990 2nd Rd - 26th Overall to Calgary Flames (Hawkesbury Hawks CJHL)
Dave Donnelly - 1981 2nd Rd - 27th Overall to Minnesota North Stars (St. Albert Saints SJHL)
Curt Ridley - 1971 2nd Rd - 28th Overall to Boston Bruins (Portage Terriers MJHL)
Dave Reierson - 1982 2nd Rd - 29th Overall to Calgary Flames (Prince Albert Raiders SJHL)
Brad Berry - 1983 2nd Rd - 29th Overall to Winnipeg Jets (St. Albert Saints AJHL)
Neil Wilkinson - 1986 2nd Rd - 30th Overall to Minnesota North Stars (Selkirk Steelers MJHL)

Other notable players to be drafted directly from Junior A hockey include: Al MacAdam, Ken Houston, Cam Botting, Troy Murray, Chris Chelios, Dave Ellett, Ray Ferraro, Tony Hrkac, Brett Hull, Tom Tilley, Danton Cole, Mike Eastwood, Garry Valk, Dixon Ward, Greg Johnson, Anson Carter, Ryan Johnson, and Bates Battaglia.

=== Player of the Year Award ===
Recipients of the Player of the Year Award:

- 1971-1978 Unknown
- 1979 Tom Manley - Nepean Raiders (CJHL)
- 1980 Bruce Campbell - North River North Stars (IJHL)
- 1981 James Patrick - Prince Albert Raiders (SJHL)
- 1982-1988 Unknown
- 1989 Greg Johnson - Thunder Bay Flyers (USHL)
- 1990 Duane Saulnier - Halifax Jr. Canadians (MVJHL)
- 1991 Devin Edgerton - Humboldt Broncos (SJHL)
- 1992 Paul Kariya - Penticton Panthers (BCHL)
- 1993 Derek Cormier - Moncton Beavers (MJAHL)
- 1994 Martin Duval - Chateauguay Elites (QPJHL)
- 1995 Cory Cyrenne - St. Boniface Saints (MJHL)
- 1996 Trent Walfort - Newmarket 87's (OPJHL)
- 1997 Darryl Moxam - Rayside-Balfour Sabrecats (NOJHL)
- 1998 Mike Comrie - St. Albert Saints (AJHL)
- 1999 Dany Heatley - Calgary Canucks (AJHL)
- 2000 Junior Lessard - Portage Terriers (MJHL)
- 2001 Tyler Brosz - Olds Grizzlys (AJHL)
- 2002 Jeff Tambellini - Chilliwack Chiefs (BCHL)
- 2003 Mark Bomersback - Canmore Eagles (AJHL)
- 2004 Nick Johnson - St. Albert Saints (AJHL)
- 2005 Michael Olson - Nanaimo Clippers (BCHL)
- 2006 Jordan Knox - Summerside Western Capitals (MJAHL)
- 2007 Kyle Turris - Burnaby Express (BCHL)
- 2008 Joe Colborne - Camrose Kodiaks (AJHL)
- 2009 Eric Delong - Portage Terriers (MJHL)
- 2010 Cody Kunyk - Sherwood Park Crusaders (AJHL)
- 2011 Zach Hyman - Hamilton Red Wings (OJHL)
- 2012 Christian Finch - Stouffville Spirit (OJHL)
- 2013 Cam Maclise - Brooks Bandits (AJHL)
- 2014 Andy Sturtz - Carleton Place Canadians (CCHL)
- 2015 Nic Renyard - Okotoks Oilers (AJHL)
- 2016 Tyson Jost - Penticton Vees (BCHL)
- 2017 Cale Makar - Brooks Bandits (AJHL)
- 2018 Chris Van Os-Shaw - Spruce Grove Saints (AJHL)
- 2019 Alex Newhook - Victoria Grizzlies (BCHL)
- 2020 Devon Levi - Carleton Place Canadians (CCHL)
- 2021 Not Awarded
- 2022 Ryan McAllister - Brooks Bandits (AJHL)
- 2023 Aiden Fink - Brooks Bandits (AJHL)

=== RBC National Junior A Scholarship ===
Every year, each of the ten leagues of the CJHL choose their scholastic player of the year. One of these ten players is chosen to win the $5000 CAD RBC National Junior A Scholarship.

- 2000 Justin Pino – Soo Thunderbirds (NOJHL)
- 2001 Mathiew Shank - Sudbury Jr. Wolves (NOJHL)
- 2002 Jeff Ellis - Charlottetown Abbies (MJAHL)
- 2003 Donald Johnstone - Truro Bearcats (MJAHL)
- 2004 Adam Kinnaird - Fort Saskatchewan Traders (AJHL)
- 2005 Sam Coliza - Kingston Voyageurs (OPJHL)
- 2006 TJ Sutter - Nipawin Hawks (SJHL)
- 2007 Ian Macdonald - Kingston Voyageurs (OPJHL)
- 2008 Danny Mireault - Joliette Action (QJAAAHL)
- 2009 Kevin Ross - Alberni Valley Bulldogs (BCHL)
- 2010 Samuel MacCormick - Bridgewater Lumberjacks (MJAHL)
- 2011 Geoffrey Gieni - Soo Thunderbirds (NOJHL)
- 2012 Theodore Hannah - Carleton Place Canadians (CCHL)
- 2013 Thomas Martin - Vaudreuil-Dorion Mustangs (QJAAAHL)
- 2014 Richard Court - Georgetown Raiders (OJHL)
- 2015 Josh Teves - Merritt Centennials (BCHL)
- 2016 Brandon Grandinetti - Soo Thunderbirds (NOJHL)
- 2017 Owen Grant - Carleton Place Canadians (CCHL)
- 2018 Geoff Kitt – Carleton Place Canadians (CCHL)
- 2019 Luke MacMillan – Truro Bearcats (MHL)

== See also ==
- World Junior A Challenge
- Ontario Hockey Association
- List of ice hockey leagues
