= Eastern Junior A Hockey League =

Canadian sports league

Eastern Junior A Hockey League
Membership	Maritime Amateur Hockey Association
Founded	1974
Ceased	1980
Regional Champions	0
National Champions	0
First Champion	Port Hawkesbury Strait Pirates (1975)
Last Champion	Northside Trojans (1980)

The Eastern Junior A Hockey League (EJHL, EJAHL) was a Junior "A" ice hockey league from Cape Breton Island, Nova Scotia, Canada. The Eastern Junior A Hockey League was in competition for the Manitoba Centennial Cup, the National Junior A Championship from 1975 until 1978.

== History ==
In the mid-1970s, the Maritime Amateur Hockey Association allowed the Eastern Junior B Hockey League of Cape Breton Island to play at the Junior A level. The 1975 Champion Port Hawkesbury Strait Pirates and Antigonish Bulldogs refused to jump to Junior A and elected to play in the Northumberland Junior B Hockey League. The EJAHL expanded with a new team in New Waterford and continued on with four teams.

Over the next two seasons, the Sydney Millionaires were the cream of the crop in the EJAHL. Winning both the 1976 and 1977 Regular Season and Playoff Championships, the Millionaires twice made it into the Centennial Cup playdowns. In 1976, the Millionaires were dropped in five games by the Charlottetown Colonels of the Island Junior Hockey League. A year later, the Millionaires first played the Corner Brook Jr. Royals of the Newfoundland Junior A Hockey League sweeping them in the process. In the second round of the playoffs, the Millionaires met Charlottetown again and were swept again.

In the 1977–78 season, the New Waterford Jets found their legs and took both the regular season and playoff crowns. In an anticlimactic ending to the league, the Jets took on the Metro Valley Junior Hockey League's first ever Junior A champion in 1978, the Cole Harbour Colts from Nova Scotia's mainland and were defeated by them.

In 1979, New Waterford repeated as champions. They lost to the MVJHL's Halifax Lions 4-games-to-none in the provincial final.

In 1980, the Northside Trojans won the league. They lost to the MVJHL's Cole Harbour Colts in four straight games.

In the early 1980s, the league was demoted to Jr. B and merged with the Northumberland Junior B Hockey League. In 1992, that league merged with the Mainland Junior B Hockey League to form the Nova Scotia Junior B Hockey League that exists to this day. Even now, the Strait Pirates of Port Hawkesbury still exist and the Cape Breton Canadians who were formed as the Sydney Millionaires in the 1970s are still playing in the NSJHL.

== Teams ==
- Antigonish Bulldogs
- County Centennials
- Glace Bay Miners
- New Waterford Jets
- North Sydney Victorias/Northside Trojans
- Port Hawkesbury Strait Pirates
- Sydney Millionaires

== Regular season champions ==
- 1975 Port Hawkesbury Strait Pirates
- 1976 Sydney Millionaires
- 1977 Sydney Millionaires
- 1978 New Waterford Jets
- 1979 New Waterford Jets
- 1980 Glace Bay Miners

== Playoff champions ==
- 1975 Port Hawkesbury Strait Pirates
- 1976 Sydney Millionaires
- 1977 Sydney Millionaires
- 1978 New Waterford Jets
- 1979 New Waterford Jets
- 1980 Northside Trojans

== National Playdowns ==
- 1976 - Lost Eastern Manitoba Centennial Cup Semi-final

Charlottetown Colonels (IJHL) defeated Sydney Millionaires 4-games-to-1 in East MCC semi-final

- 1977 - Lost Eastern Manitoba Centennial Cup Semi-final

Sydney Millionaires defeated Corner Brook Jr. Royals (NJAHL) 4-games-to-none in East MCC quarter-final
Charlottetown Generals (IJHL) defeated Sydney Millionaires 4-games-to-none in East MCC semi-final

- 1978 - Lost Eastern Manitoba Centennial Cup Quarter-final

Cole Harbour Colts (MVJHL) defeated New Waterford Jets 4-games-to-none in East MCC quarter-final

- 1979 - Lost Eastern Manitoba Centennial Cup Semi-final

Halifax Lions (MVJHL) defeated New Waterford Jets 4-games-to-none in East MCC semi-final

- 1980 - Lost Eastern Manitoba Centennial Cup Semi-final

Cole Harbour Colts (MVJHL) defeated Northside Trojans 4-games-to-none in East MCC semi-final

== See also ==
- Maritime Hockey League
- Canadian Junior Hockey League
- Fred Page Cup
- Royal Bank Cup
- Hockey Nova Scotia
