= Newfoundland Junior A Hockey League =

Canadian junior ice hockey league

Newfoundland Junior A Hockey League
| Membership | Newfoundland Amateur Hockey Association |
| Founded | 1971 |
| Ceased | 1976 |
| Atlantic Junior A Champions | 1 |
| National Champions | 0 |
| First Champion | Gander Jr. Flyers (1972) |
| Last Champion | Stephenville Jr. Monarchs (1976) |

The Newfoundland Junior A Hockey League (NJAHL) was a Canadian Junior ice hockey league in the province of Newfoundland. The NJAHL was in competition for the Callaghan Cup and the Canadian National Junior A Championship, the Centennial Cup.

== History ==
Founded in 1971, the NJAHL had a short and rocky history. In its first season, the team originated with teams in Gander, Clarenville, Bay St. George, and Port-aux-Basques. The first season had no true playoffs, with the league title being awarded to the Gander Jr. Flyers for having a superior record. Mid-season, Gander was elected to play the St. John's Jr. Capitals, the only Jr. A team in the East, for the Veitch Memorial Trophy and the right to proceed in the 1972 Centennial Cup playdowns. St. John's won the series 2-games-to-1.

In the second season, Clarenville and Bay St. George were replaced by Buchans and Corner Brook. With no Jr. A in St. John's, Gander and Buchans would play for the Veitch Memorial Trophy with Buchans winning 4-games-to-3. Buchans would proceed to the 1973 Centennial Cup playdowns, where they lost 3-games-to-none to the Moncton Beavers of the New Brunswick Junior Hockey League.

In 1973–74, the league expanded to seven teams and separated into two divisions. Joining the league were St. John's and Conception Bay North, rejoining were Clarenville and Bay St. George, as the league lost their Buchans entry. In what would be the league's biggest season, the East Division champs, Gander Jr. Flyers, and West Division champs, Bay St. George Huskies, met for the league title and Veitch Memorial Trophy. Gander took the series 4-games-to-1. In the 1974 Centennial Cup playdowns, the Jr. Flyers were defeated by the Island Junior Hockey League's Charlottetown Colonels 3-games-to-none.

In 1974–75, the NJAHL dropped back down to four teams, losing Port-aux-Basques, St. John's, Conception Bay North, and Corner Brook, but gained Grand Falls. Gander crushed their competition, to the point that no other team in the league had a winning record. Gander took the regular season crown and the playoff crown by defeating the Clarenville Caribous 4-games-to-none. In the 1975 Centennial Cup playdowns, the Flyers defeated the Island Junior Hockey League's Charlottetown Colonels 3-games-to-none to win the Atlantic Junior A Championship. In the next round, the Eastern Canada Quarter-final, the Jr. Flyers dropped to the Central Junior A Hockey League's Smiths Falls Bears in four straight games. The Bears would go on to win the Eastern Crown but lose the Centennial Cup Final.

In 1975–76, the Gander Jr. Flyers folded after the best performance by a Newfoundland Junior A team to date. The teams were reorganized into a Junior B league for that season (under the name West Newfoundland League), with teams in Stephenville, Corner Brook, Port-aux-Basques, and Deer Lake. Stephenville would reign victorious, but when it came to the Veitch Memorial Trophy they couldn't come to terms with the St. John's Jr. Capitals for a series and the Provincial title was vacated.

In 1976–77, the league was complete shut down. Three teams remained and were allowed to declare themselves Junior A: Corner Brook, St. John's, and Stephenville. Corner Brook would defeat Stephenville in the provincial semi-final 3-games-to-none, and then defeat St. John's 2-games-to-1 for the Veitch Memorial Trophy. In the 1977 Centennial Cup playdowns, the Corner Brook Jr. Royals would be dropped 4-games-to-none by the Sydney Millionaires of the Eastern Junior A Hockey League.

Junior A hockey would not be played in Newfoundland again until 1989 in the St. John's Junior Hockey League.

== Teams ==
- Bay St. George Huskies/Stephenville Jr. Monarchs
- Buchans Miners
- Clarenville Caribous
- Corner Brook Jr. Royals
- Conception Bay North Stars
- Deer Lake Sabres
- Gander Jr. Flyers
- Grand Falls Jr. Cataracts
- Port-aux-Basques Gulls
- St. John's Jr. Capitals

== Champions ==
- 1972 Gander Jr. Flyers
- 1973 Buchans Miners
- 1974 Gander Jr. Flyers
- 1975 Gander Jr. Flyers
- 1976 Stephenville Jr. Monarchs

=== Veitch Memorial Trophy Provincial Junior A Champions ===
- 1972 St. John's Jr. Capitals (Independent)
- 1973 Buchans Miners
- 1974 Gander Jr. Flyers
- 1975 Gander Jr. Flyers
- 1976 No Jr. A teams in Newfoundland
- 1977 Corner Brook Jr. Royals (Independent)

=== Atlantic Region Junior A Champions ===
- 1975 Gander Jr. Flyers
