= Eastlink Centre =

Arena in Charlottetown, Prince Edward Island

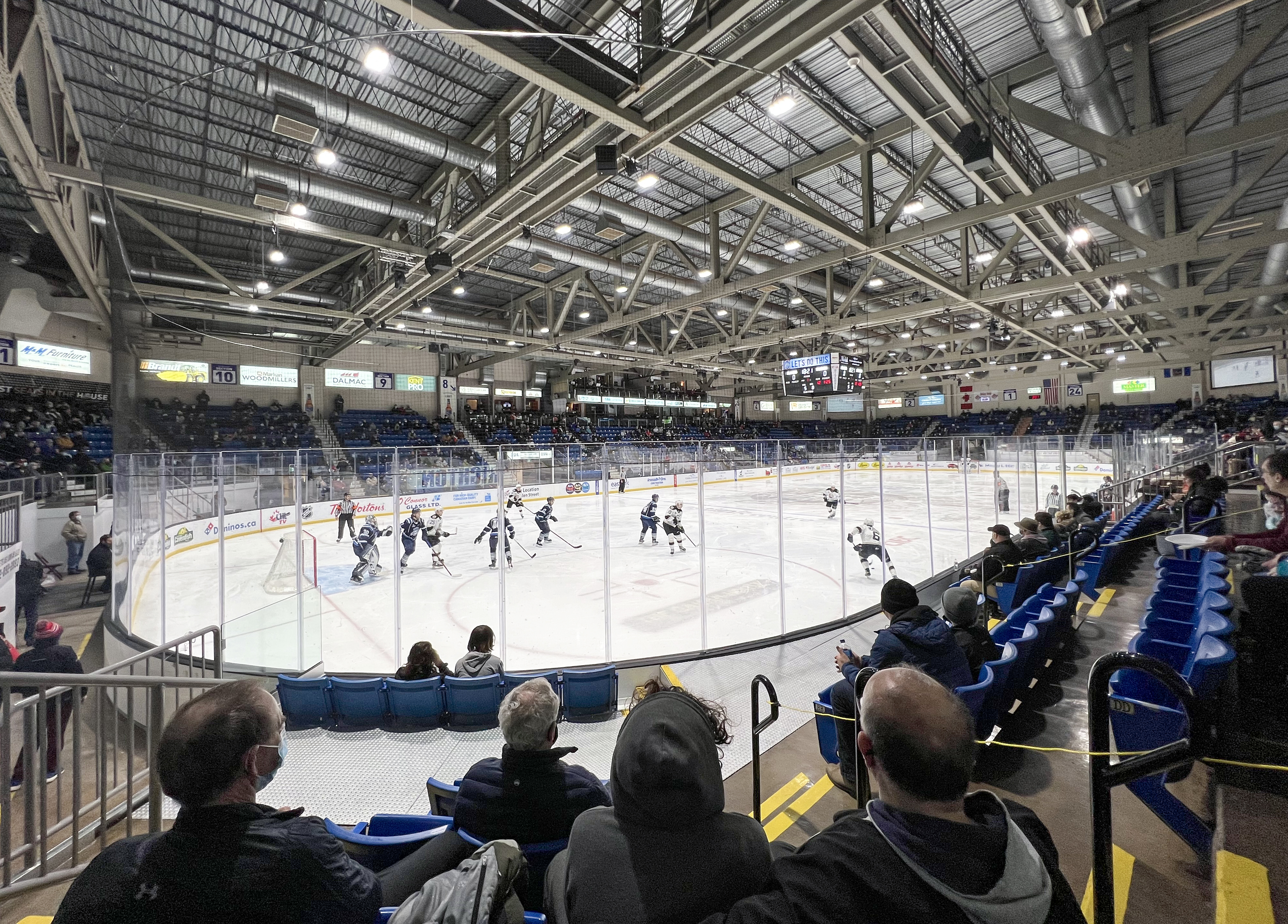

- Location within Prince Edward Island Location within Canada
- Former names: Charlottetown Civic Centre (1989–2013)
- Address: 46 Kensington Road; Charlottetown, Prince Edward Island; C1A 5H7
- Coordinates: 46°14′44″N 63°07′02″W
- Capacity: 4,000 (Basketball); 3,717 (seated, hockey)
- Surface: 200' X 85'

Construction
- Opened: 1990
- Renovated: 2003

Tenants
- Charlottetown Abbies (MHL) (1990–2003); UPEI Panthers (AUAA) (1990–2003); 1991 Canada Winter Games (1991); P.E.I. Senators (AHL) (1993–1996); P.E.I. Rocket (QMJHL) (2003–2013); Charlottetown Islanders (QMJHL) (2013–present); Island Storm (NBLC) (2013–2020)

The Eastlink Centre (French: Centre Eastlink) (formerly known as the Charlottetown Civic Centre) is a combined hockey/basketball arena and trade and convention facility located in Charlottetown, Prince Edward Island, Canada.

== History ==
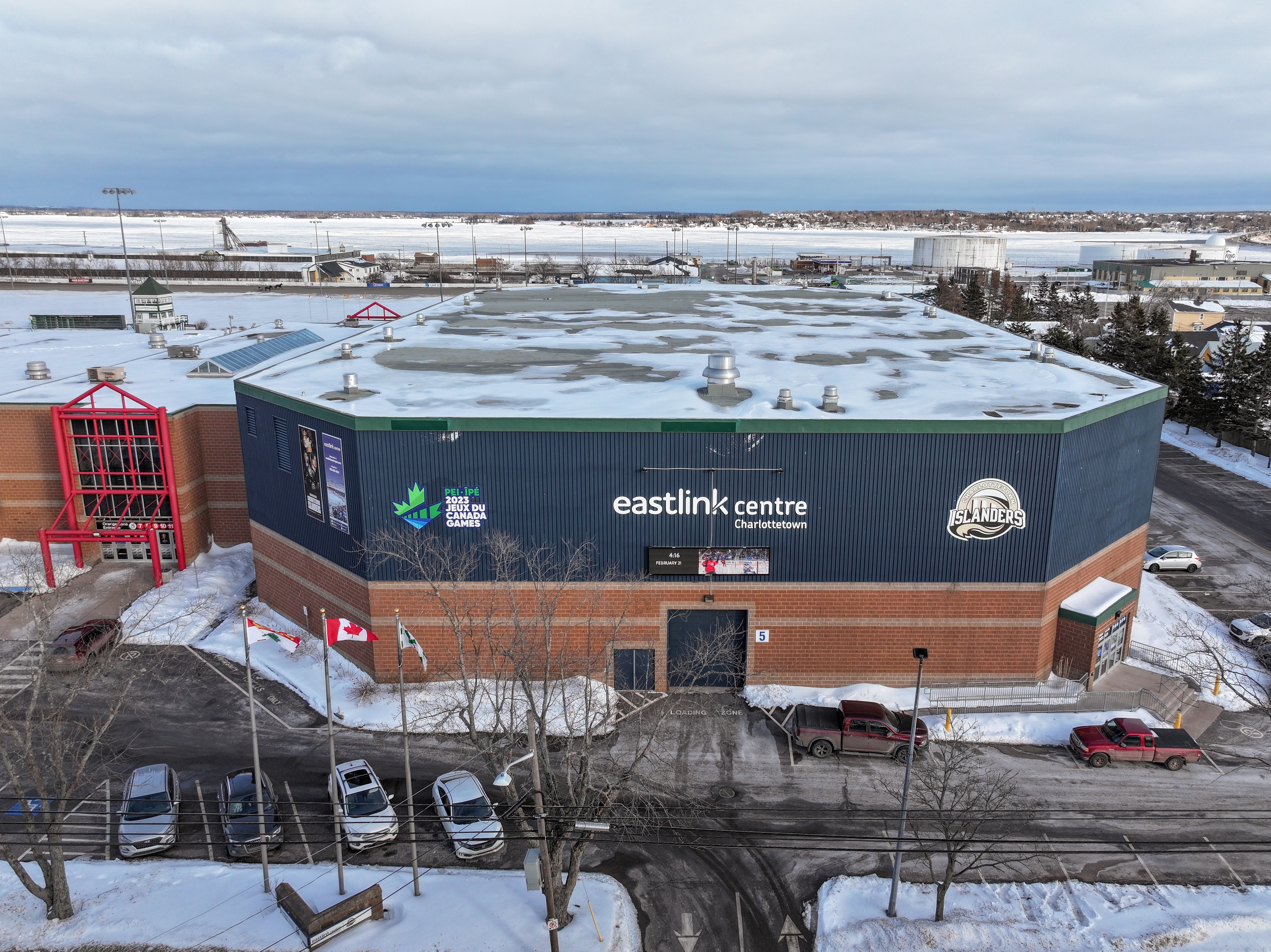
Exterior

The facility's original name was the Charlottetown Civic Centre (1989–2013). It was built in 1989–1990 and opened in the fall of 1990 as the principal venue for the 1991 Canada Winter Games which Prince Edward Island hosted in February 1991.

The facility's location was the subject of significant controversy during its planning stages as various sites were being considered within the City of Charlottetown and surrounding communities; Charlottetown having argued that as host city for the games, the facility should be located on land within its boundaries. It was eventually decided by the games organizing committee and the federal and provincial governments to build the arena as part of a larger redevelopment of the Provincial Exhibition grounds in the neighbouring town of Parkdale (which amalgamated into Charlottetown in 1996).

The 3,200 seat capacity arena was to be built on the southern side of the Charlottetown Driving Park (a harness racing track) and adjoining Kennedy Coliseum (an agricultural show facility), which would be renovated into a multi-use exhibition hall. Following construction there were many complaints from patrons and tenants of the arena, citing wasted space and the lack of seating down to the boards.

Following the 1991 Canada Winter Games, the Charlottetown Civic Centre and its arena became the responsibility of the City of Charlottetown (despite being located outside city limits until municipal amalgamation in 1996). In 2003, following extended complaints from patrons and tenants, the arena's seating was redesigned and expanded with additional seating placed down to the glass in several locations, as well as "luxury boxes" or sky boxes. The current capacity of the arena is 3,718 (3,690 seated).

On September 13, 2013, Charlottetown City Council announced that the facility was being renamed the Eastlink Centre after selling the naming rights for an undetermined period of time to the telecommunications company Eastlink.

== Tenants ==
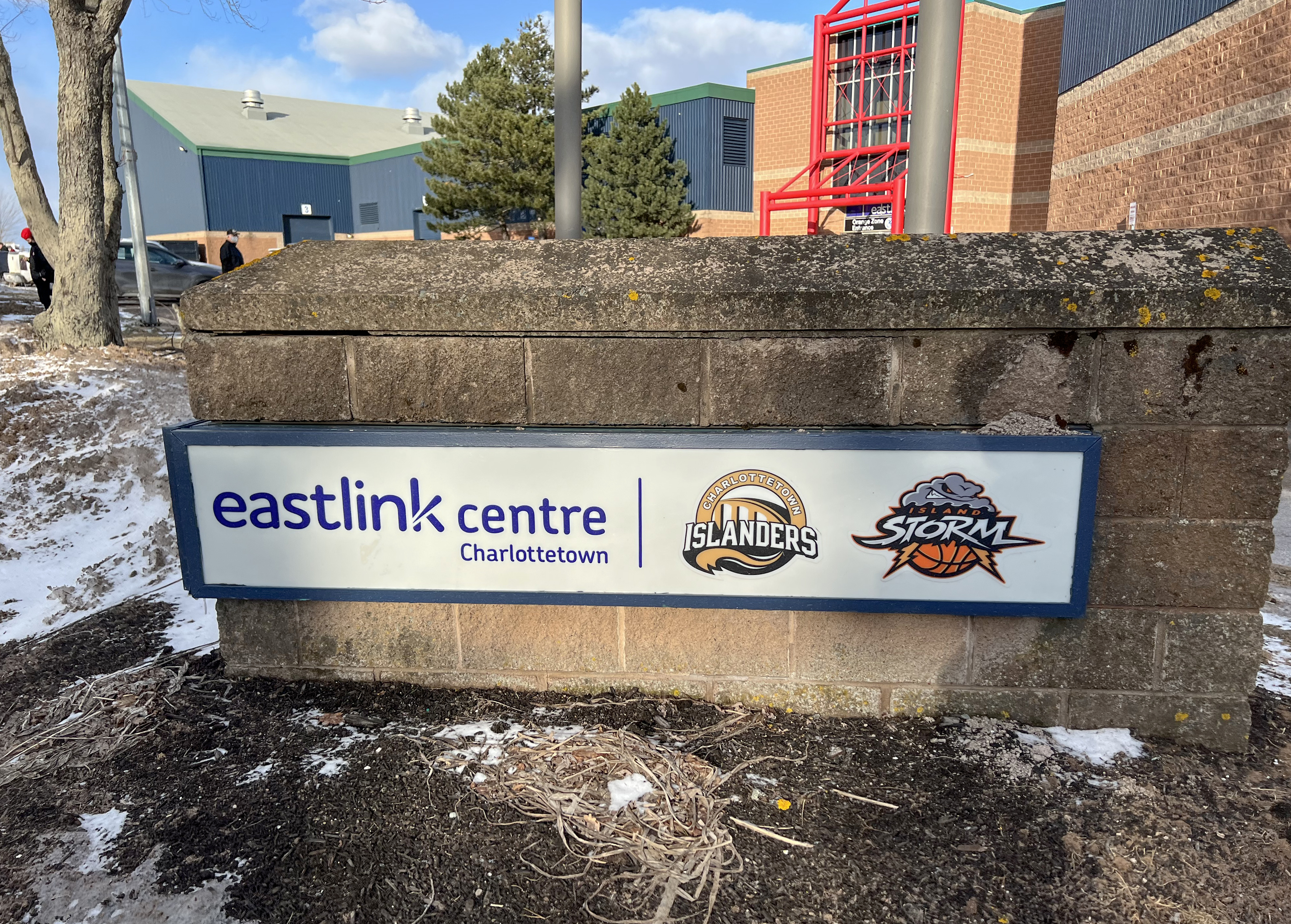
Entrance sign

The facility has been the home rink of the Charlottetown Islanders, formerly the PEI Rocket, of the Quebec Maritimes Junior Hockey League since the team relocated from Montreal in 2003.

From 2013 to 2020, the Eastlink Centre was the home of the Island Storm of the National Basketball League of Canada.

From 1993 to 1996, the facility was the home of the American Hockey League's Prince Edward Island Senators.

From 1990 to 2003, the facility was also home to the Charlottetown Abbies of the Maritime Junior A Hockey League, as well as the University of Prince Edward Island "Panthers" men's hockey team of the Atlantic Universities Athletic Association (now Atlantic University Sport). Both of these teams were former tenants of the Charlottetown Forum, a facility which was closed following the civic centre's opening in 1990. Both teams moved in the fall of 2003 to the newly built MacLauchlan Arena on the University of Prince Edward Island campus.

Until the 2008 opening of the Consolidated Credit Union Place located in Summerside, the facility was the largest indoor public sports facility in the province. It has also hosted a number of concerts, trade shows, wrestling shows and tournaments such as the 1999 Scott Tournament of Hearts, 2003 Royal Bank Cup, 2006 Telus Cup, 2023 Canada Games and 2023 World U-17 Hockey Challenge. The facility also hosted the 2006 Quebec Major Junior Hockey League draft.

In 2011, the facility hosted the 2011 Scotties Tournament of Hearts from February 19 to 27. The centre will host the 2027 Scotties in February, 2027.

== Concerts ==
The facility has hosted numerous concerts over the years, including The Tragically Hip, Bryan Adams, The Guess Who, Willie Nelson, The White Stripes, George Jones, and Girlicious on their first tour. On November 3, 2009, magician David Copperfield performed there. Stompin' Tom Connors was the first to play there.
