= Kelowna Buckaroos =

Kelowna Buckaroos
City	Kelowna, British Columbia
League	British Columbia Hockey League
Operated	1961–1988
Home Arena	Kelowna Memorial Arena
Colours	Red, Black, and White

The Kelowna Buckaroos were a Tier II Junior "A" ice hockey team from Kelowna, British Columbia, Canada. They were a part of the British Columbia Hockey League.

Kelowna Buckaroos 1961 - 1983
Summerland Buckaroos 1983 - 1988

== History ==
The Kelowna Buckaroos are one of the original four of the British Columbia Hockey League. They won two league titles, a British Columbia title (the Mowat Cup), and a Doyle Cup as Alberta/BC Champions. In 1983, the Buckaroos moved to Summerland, British Columbia. Their season-to-season success dwindled in Summerland as they were replaced in Kelowna by the Kelowna Packers in 1985. The Buckaroos played their final game in 1988 after four straight losing records.

== Season-by-season record ==
Note: GP = Games Played, W = Wins, L = Losses, T = Ties, OTL = Overtime Losses, GF = Goals for, GA = Goals against

Season	GP	W	L	T	OTL	GF	GA	Points	Finish	Playoffs
1961-62	28	17	10	1	-	148	109	35	2nd OMJHL	Lost final
1962-63	32	26	3	3	-	243	100	55	1st OMJHL	Lost final
1963-64	35	17	16	2	-	165	171	36	2nd OJHL	Lost final
1964-65	30	14	11	5	-	137	99	33	2nd OJHL	Won League
1965-66	30	24	6	0	-	180	87	48	1st OJHL	Lost final
1966-67	40	26	14	0	-	-	-	52	2nd OJHL	Lost final
1967-68	40	14	20	6	-	180	179	34	4th BCJHL	Lost semi-final
1968-69	40	18	14	8	-	182	173	44	4th BCJHL	Lost semi-final
1969-70	48	17	29	2	-	200	260	36	6th BCJHL	DNQ
1970-71	60	8	50	2	-	178	364	18	4th BCJHL Interior	Lost quarter-final
1971-72	60	21	30	9	-	-	-	51	5th BCJHL	DNQ
1972-73	62	34	27	1	-	347	310	69	3rd BCJHL Interior	Lost quarter-final
1973-74	64	44	18	2	-	375	235	90	1st BCJHL Interior	Won League, won Mowat Cup, won Doyle Cup
1974-75	66	46	20	0	-	458	297	92	1st BCJHL Interior	Lost final
1975-76	66	37	28	1	-	348	307	75	3rd BCJHL	Lost quarter-final
1976-77	68	49	18	1	-	451	300	99	1st BCJHL Interior	Lost semi-final
1977-78	66	40	26	0	-	355	290	80	3rd BCJHL Interior	Lost quarter-final
1978-79	62	28	32	2	-	265	323	58	4th BCJHL Interior	Lost quarter-final
1979-80	60	25	33	2	-	335	327	52	3rd BCJHL Interior	Lost semi-final
1980-81	56	36	20	0	-	390	261	72	1st BCJHL Interior	Lost semi-final
1981-82	48	33	14	1	-	287	208	67	2nd BCJHL Interior	Lost semi-final
1982-83	56	35	19	2	-	338	218	72	1st BCJHL Interior	Lost final
1983-84	60	31	29	0	-	328	304	62	3rd BCJHL Interior	Lost semi-final
1984-85	52	24	28	0	-	289	324	48	4th BCJHL Interior	Lost quarter-final
1985-86	52	19	30	3	-	311	379	41	5th BCJHL Interior	Lost semi-final
1986-87	52	5	45	2	-	169	440	12	5th BCJHL Interior	DNQ
1987-88	51	6	44	1	-	191	474	13	6th BCJHL Interior	DNQ

== See also ==
- List of ice hockey teams in British Columbia
