= Charlottetown Abbies =

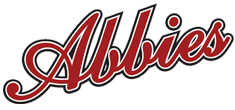
- City: Charlottetown, Prince Edward Island
- League: Maritime Junior A Hockey League; Island Junior Hockey League; Southeast New Brunswick Junior B Hockey League
- Operated: 1972–2008
- Home arena: Charlottetown Civic Centre; MacLauchlan Arena
- Colours: Yellow, Black, and Red

Franchise history
- 1972–1977: Charlottetown Abbies
- 1977–1986: Charlottetown Eagles
- 1986–2008: Charlottetown Abbies

Previous franchise history
- 1968–1973: Charlottetown Islanders
- Circa 1971–1976: Charlottetown Colonels
- 1976–1977: Charlottetown Generals

The Charlottetown Abbies is the name of several ice hockey teams that have been based in Charlottetown, Prince Edward Island; the most recent iteration was a Tier II Junior "A" team who played in the IJHL and the Maritime Junior A Hockey League. Their home rink from 2003 to 2008 was the MacLauchlan Arena on the campus of UPEI. Before then, it was the Charlottetown Civic Centre (now Eastlink Centre).

== History ==
The earliest version of the team, which also called itself "the Charlottetown Abegweit" (in reference to the Mikmaq name of Prince Edward Island), was inducted into the Prince Edward Island Sports Hall of Fame in 1973 for playing the entire 1921-22 and 1922-23 seasons with only one lost game, but disbanded in 1924. Another iteration of "the Charlottetown Abbies" was active in 1934.

In 1972, the Charlottetown Abbies were a Midget Hockey program with little competition. They applied for entry into the Island Junior Hockey League in 1972. The IJHL turned down their application on the basis that they were too weak for Junior B competition. The Abbies, undeterred, applied for entry into the Southeast New Brunswick Junior B Hockey League instead. The New Brunswick league allowed the Abbies to join and after a slow start the Abbies ended up finishing second in the regular season (to the Dieppe Voyageurs) and winning the league playoffs. To win the playoffs, the Abbies defeated the Bouctouche Seals 3-games-to-none (9-3, 9–3, forfeit) in the semi-final and then defeated the Memramcook Legionnaires 3-games-to-none (8-1, 10–2, forfeit) in the League Final. The Abbies then failed to qualify for the 5-team New Brunswick provincial championship round robin because they lost the Southeast New Brunswick qualifier to the independent Moncton Flyers 2-games-to-none (4-3, 3-1). In 1973, the IJHL was promoted to Junior A and the Abbies were granted expansion into the league.

The Abbies were an institution in Junior hockey in Charlottetown for several decades. In the 70s the Island Junior Hockey League (IJHL) boasted two Charlottetown teams, the Generals who played in the old Charlottetown Forum, and the Abbies who were based at the Simmons Sports Centre. The league also included at one time or another the Kings County Kings, Summerside Crystals (Summerside Western Capitals), West Prince Bluefins, North River North Stars, and the Sherwood-Parkdale Metros. Eventually the two Charlottetown teams merged, maintaining the Abbies moniker. As costs became prohibitive for an Island wide league at the Junior A level in the late 80s, teams in the league folded. Eventually, in 1991 the Abbies and the Summerside Western Capitals left to join teams in Nova Scotia and New Brunswick to form the Maritime Junior Hockey League.

In May 2008, it was announced that the Abbies' management had applied for a year's leave of absence from the Maritime Junior Hockey League, citing financial problems. The team almost relocated to Lewiston, Maine when the Lewiston Maineiacs (QMJHL) tried to relocate to Boisbriand, Quebec.

In May 2009, the commissioner of the MHL stated in a newspaper interview that the Abbies would not operate again. On June 4, 2009, CBC reported the folding of the Abbies franchise. The end of the Charlottetown Abbies meant that, for the first time since 1972, the City of Charlottetown did not have a Junior A team.

== Logos ==
The Abbies have had many versions of the same logo until the 2007–08 season when they switched to their current script logo.

Main logo 2000–2003	Main logo 2003–2006	Main Logo 2006–2007

== Season-by-season record ==
Season	GP	W	L	T	OTL	GF	GA	P	Results	Playoffs
1972-73	12	9	3	0	-	75	40	28	2nd SNBJHL	Won League
1973-74	29	7	20	2	-	115	178	16	6th IJHL	
1974-75	40	7	28	5	-	163	247	19	6th IJHL	
1975-76	39	6	28	5	-	145	278	17	6th IJHL	
1976-77	40	12	25	3	-	194	224	27	4th IJHL	
1977-78	39	23	8	8	-	--	--	54	2nd IJHL	Won League
1978-79	40	31	5	4	-	219	96	66	1st IJHL	
1979-80	39	19	14	6	-	210	167	44	3rd IJHL	
1980-81	34	13	18	3	-	186	197	29	3rd IJHL	
1981-82	42	22	17	3	-	336	287	47	2nd IJHL	
1982-83	42	10	29	3	-	212	301	23	4th IJHL	
1983-84	40	19	15	6	-	230	200	44	2nd IJHL	
1984-85	38	15	18	5	-	175	211	35	3rd IJHL	
1985-86	36	13	15	8	-	184	202	34	3rd IJHL	Lost semi-final
1986-87	42	26	10	6	-	224	174	58	1st IJHL	
1987-88	42	16	19	7	-	231	253	39	3rd IJHL	
1988-89	44	22	15	7	-	245	185	56	2nd IJHL	
1989-90	40	30	5	2	3	203	121	65	1st IJHL	
1990-91	42	29	8	3	2	277	167	63	2nd IJHL	
1991-92	47	22	16	9	-	276	203	53	3rd MJAHL	
1992-93	48	20	19	8	1	199	227	49	4th MJAHL	
1993-94	48	17	27	1	3	216	253	38	6th MJAHL	
1994-95	Did Not Participate									
1995-96	54	18	29	3	4	217	272	43	7th MJAHL	
1996-97	56	21	30	2	3	294	324	47	7th MJAHL	
1997-98	52	26	20	3	3	237	227	58	5th MJAHL	
1998-99	48	41	5	2	-	266	141	84	1st MJAHL	Won League, won FPC
1999-00	52	19	31	2	0	198	247	40	6th MJAHL	
2000-01	52	28	20	3	1	215	187	60	5th MJAHL	
2001-02	52	24	24	4	0	198	194	52	7th MJAHL	
2002-03	52	43	5	1	3	229	130	90	1st MJAHL	Won League
2003-04	52	22	24	2	4	231	238	50	6th MJAHL	
2004-05	56	26	19	7	4	207	205	63	5th MJAHL	
2005-06	56	20	34	0	2	193	240	43	10th MJAHL	Lost Division QF
2006-07	58	9	47	0	2	145	322	20	12th MJAHL	DNQ
2007-08	58	29	25	-	4	215	236	62	8th MJAHL	

== National playdowns ==
1978

Charlottetown Eagles defeated Cole Harbour Colts (MVJHL) 4-games-to-none in Eastern Centennial Cup Semi-final
Guelph Platers (OPJHL) defeated Charlottetown Eagles 4-games-to-2 in Eastern Centennial Cup Final

1985

Cole Harbour Colts (MVJHL) defeated Charlottetown Eagles 4-games-to-2 in Callaghan Cup Final

1987

Dartmouth Fuel Kids (MVJHL) defeated Charlottetown Abbies 4-games-to-1 in Callaghan Cup Final

1990

Charlottetown Abbies defeated Avalon Jr. Capitals (SJJHL) in Callaghan Cup Semi-final
Amherst Ramblers (MVJHL) defeated Charlottetown Abbies 4-games-to-1 in Callaghan Cup Final

1991

Halifax Canadians (MVJHL) defeated Charlottetown Abbies 4-games-to-none in Callaghan Cup Semi-final

1999

Charlottetown Abbies win Fred Page Cup

Defeated Hawkesbury Hawks (CJHL 6-3
Defeated Valleyfield Braves (QJAAAHL) 5-2
Defeated Antigonish Bulldogs (MJAHL)
Defeated Hawkesbury Hawks (CJHL) 2-0 in Finals

Charlottetown Abbies lost 1999 Royal Bank Cup Final

Lost to Yorkton Terriers (SJHL) 2-1
Defeated Vernon Vipers (BCHL) 6-5
Lost to Estevan Bruins (SJHL) 5-4
Defeated Bramalea Blues (OPJHL) 5-1
Defeated Yorkton Terriers (SJHL) 6-5 2OT in Semi-final
Lost to Vernon Vipers (BCHL) 9-3 in Final

2003

Charlottetown Abbies finish 4th at Fred Page Cup

Lost to Cornwall Colts (CJHL) 3-2
Lost to Nepean Raiders (CJHL) 3-1
Defeated Lennoxville Cougars (QJAAAHL) 7-5

Charlottetown Abbies finish 5th at 2003 Royal Bank Cup as hosts

Lost to Lennoxville Cougars (QJAAAHL) 5-4 2OT
Defeated Camrose Kodiaks (AJHL) 3-2
Lost to Wellington Dukes (OPJHL) 1-0 OT
Lost to Humboldt Broncos (SJHL) 8-5

== Notable alumni ==
- Forbes Kennedy (Coach)
- David Ling
- Jason MacDonald
- William Hubloo
- Ray Skinner
- Andy Bezeau
- Harley Sentner
- David Ambler (ice hockey)

== Colonels/Generals ==
The Charlottetown Generals were members of the Island Junior Hockey League in the 1970s. They folded in the summer of 1977 after winning multiple league championships. The Generals folded due to financial trouble. The full name of the team was the Charlottetown Colonel Grays from their founding up until 1976 as they were affiliated with Colonel Gray High School in Charlottetown.

=== Season-by-season record ===
Season	GP	W	L	T	OTL	GF	GA	P	Results	Playoffs
1971-72	26	17	6	3	-	130	96	43	2nd IJBHL	
1972-73	40	29	8	3	-	231	125	61	1st IJBHL	
1973-74	30	18	10	2	-	178	114	38	3rd IJHL	Won League
1974-75	40	24	14	2	-	202	163	50	1st IJHL	Won League
1975-76	40	32	7	1	-	345	138	65	1st IJHL	Won League
1976-77	40	32	6	2	-	331	129	66	2nd IJHL	Won League

=== National playdowns ===
1974

Charlottetown Colonels defeated Moncton Hawks (NBJHL) 3-games-to-2 in Eastern Centennial Cup Quarter-final
Smiths Falls Bears (CJHL) defeated Charlottetown Colonels 4-games-to-1 in Eastern Centennial Cup Semi-final

1975

Gander Flyers (NJAHL) defeated Charlottetown Colonels 3-games-to-none in Atlantic Jr. A Final

1976

Charlottetown Colonels defeated St. John 77's (NBJHL) 4-games-to-2 in Eastern Centennial Cup Quarter-final
Charlottetown Colonels defeated Sydney Millionaires (EJHL) 4-games-to-1 in Eastern Centennial Cup Semi-final
Rockland Nationals (CJHL) defeated Charlottetown Colonels 4-games-to-none in Eastern Centennial Cup Final

1977

Charlottetown Generals defeated Sydney Millionaires (EJHL) in Eastern Centennial Cup Semi-final
Pembroke Lumber Kings (CJHL) defeated Charlottetown Generals 4-games-to-none in Eastern Centennial Cup Final

=== Notable alumni ===
- Rick Vaive

== Islanders ==
The Charlottetown Islanders were founded in 1968 to represent the province of Prince Edward Island in the Memorial Cup playoffs. From 1968 until 1971, the Islanders played in the Maritime Junior A Hockey League. In 1970, Major Junior A and Tier II Junior A were created from the Junior A classification and the Islanders and their league found themselves in the Tier II level playing for the Centennial Cup. Their first year of Tier II saw them go deep and win the Eastern Canadian Championship in six games over the Detroit Jr. Red Wings of the Southern Ontario Junior A Hockey League, but lose the inaugural 1971 Centennial Cup 4-games-to-2 to the Alberta Junior Hockey League's Red Deer Rustlers. In 1971, the MJAHL folded and the Islanders opted to play an independent schedule in instead of joining the neighbouring Junior A leagues in New Brunswick or Newfoundland. For the 1971–72 season, the Islanders did not play a game until March 1972, playing a two-game exhibition series against the Hamilton Red Wings of the Ontario Major Junior Hockey League (2-2 Tie and 4-3 Win) and then jumping directly into National Playdowns as PEI's only representative. In the playoffs, the Islanders dropped the Moncton Hawks of the New Brunswick Junior Hockey League 4-games-to-1 to advance to the Eastern Centennial Cup Final. In the final, they faced the Guelph CMC's of the Southern Ontario Junior A Hockey League and were swept in four games. The Islanders were disbanded prior to the start of the 1972–73 season.

=== Season-by-season record ===
Season	GP	W	L	T	OTL	GF	GA	P	Results	Playoffs
1968-69	39	16	16	7	-	152	154	39	2nd MJAHL	Lost final
1969-70	45	36	6	3	-	323	151	75	1st MJAHL	Won League
1970-71	40	26	9	5	-	229	161	57	1st MJAHL	Won League
1971-72	No League Play									

=== National playdowns ===
1970

Charlottetown Islanders defeated Fredericton Chevies (NBJHL) 3-games-to-1 in Atlantic Jr. A Final
Charlottetown Islanders defeated Ottawa M&W Rangers (CJHL) 4-games-to-1 in Eastern Memorial Cup Quarter-final
Quebec Remparts (QMJHL) defeated Charlottetown Islanders 4-games-to-2 in Eastern Memorial Cup Semi-final

1971

Charlottetown Islanders defeated Moncton Hawks (NBJHL) 4-games-to-none in Eastern Centennial Cup Quarter-final
Charlottetown Islanders defeated Thunder Bay Marrs (TBJHL) 4-games-to-1 in Eastern Centennial Cup Semi-final
Charlottetown Islanders defeated Detroit Jr. Red Wings (SOJHL) 4-games-to-2 in Eastern Centennial Cup Final
Red Deer Rustlers (AJHL) defeated Charlottetown Islanders 4-games-to-2 in Centennial Cup Final

1972

Charlottetown Islanders defeated Moncton Hawks (NBJHL) 4-games-to-1 in Eastern Centennial Cup Semi-final
Guelph CMC's (SOJHL) defeated Charlottetown Islanders 4-games-to-none in Eastern Centennial Cup Final

=== Notable alumni ===
- Kevin Devine
- Hilliard Graves
- John Hughes
- Al MacAdam
- Bob MacMillan

== See also ==
- List of ice hockey teams in Prince Edward Island
