= Pacific Junior A Hockey League =

Canadian junior ice hockey league (1971–1979)

The Pacific Junior A Hockey League (PJHL) was a Canadian Junior "A" ice hockey league operating within the Greater Vancouver metropolitan area in British Columbia from 1971 until 1979.

== History ==
From 1962 to 1967, a Pacific Coast Junior Hockey League (PCJHL) had been a Junior "A" league in British Columbia. That PCJHL folded when the New Westminster Royals and the Victoria Cougars moved to the Okanagan-Mainline Junior "A" Hockey League, which immediately renamed itself the British Columbia Junior Hockey League (BCJHL, shortened to BCHL in 1995).

In 1971, the Pacific Coast Junior Hockey League (PCJHL) name was revived by Fred Page for a new Junior "B" league, with all six teams located within the Greater Vancouver region. Page had deep roots in managing junior hockey leagues, and today there are two championship trophies named for him – the BCHL championship Fred Page Cup, and the Eastern Canada Junior "A" championship Fred Page Cup.

Page was successful in getting the PCJHL promoted to Tier II Junior "A" for the 1973–74 season, adjusting its name to the Pacific Junior A Hockey League (PJHL). Starting that season, the PJHL champion would compete with the BCJHL champion in the BC Junior "A" Championship, the Mowat Cup, with the winner moving on to what was the precursor to the Doyle Cup. The PJHL's Nor'Wes Caps won the 1976 Mowat Cup, while the PJHL's Richmond Sockeyes won the 1977 and 1979 Mowat Cups.

Page agreed to allow a merger between his PJHL and the BCJHL for the 1979–1980 season.

In five years of Junior "A" competition, after operating for only two seasons as a Junior "B" league, the PJHL defeated the more established BCJHL in three of five Mowat Cups. In competition against the Alberta Junior Hockey League champion for the Pacific region championship, the PJHL champion went 0 for 3 and never got a chance to compete for the Western Championship Abbott Cup nor the National Championship Centennial Cup.

== Teams ==
- Chilliwack Bruins
- Coquitlam Comets
- Kerrisdale Couriers
- NorWes Caps
- Richmond Sockeyes
- Surrey Stampeders
- Vancouver Jr. Canucks/Vancouver Jr. Canadians

== Champions ==
In the chart, league champions are bolded.

**Year**	**League Champion**	**League Runner-up**
Junior B Era
1972	Nor'Wes Caps
1973	Nor'Wes Caps
1974
Junior A Era
1975	Coquitlam Comets	Surrey Stampeders
1976	Nor'Wes Caps	Vancouver Jr. Canucks
1977	Richmond Sockeyes	Surrey Stampeders
1978	Richmond Sockeyes	Kerrisdale Couriers
1979	Richmond Sockeyes	Nor'Wes Caps

== See also ==
- Canadian Junior A Hockey League
- Royal Bank Cup
- Memorial Cup
- Hockey Canada
- British Columbia Hockey League
- Kootenay International Junior Hockey League
