= Maritime Junior A Hockey League (1968–1971) =

Canadian junior ice hockey league (1968–1971)

Maritime Junior A Hockey League
| Membership | Maritime Amateur Hockey Association |
| Founded | 1968 |
| Ceased | 1971 |
| Regional Champions | 1 |
| National Champions | 0 |
| First Champion | Halifax Canadiens (1969) |
| Last Champion | Charlottetown Islanders (1971) |

The original Maritime Junior A Hockey League was a Canadian Junior ice hockey league from 1968 until 1971 in the provinces of New Brunswick, Nova Scotia, and Prince Edward Island. The league competed for the Memorial Cup until 1970 when it was relegated to Tier II Junior A and then competed one year for the Centennial Cup before becoming defunct.

== History ==
Founded in 1968, the MJAHL was meant to be the Atlantic answer to the Ontario Hockey Association and Western Canada Junior Hockey League. In 1970, when Junior A was split into Major Junior A and Tier II Junior A, the MJAHL was found on the Tier II side of things. The league lost interest without Memorial Cup eligibility and folded in 1971, right after the Charlottetown Islanders came within two games of claiming the 1971 Centennial Cup.

The creation of the league spawned competition in 1969 with the creation of the New Brunswick Junior Hockey League. Other leagues filled the gap of the league when it folded: the Island Junior Hockey League (1973–1991) in 1973 and the Metro Valley Junior Hockey League in 1977.

In 1991, the Maritime Junior A Hockey League was created through the merger of the aforementioned NBJHL, IJHL, and MVJHL as the NBJHL and MVJHL merged in 1983 and the IJHL joined the fold in 1991 to reconsolidate Maritime Junior A.

Of the team that played in the Original MJAHL, only the Moncton Beavers still exist under the name Edmundston Blizzard in the current MJAHL.

== Teams ==
- Cape Breton Metros
- Charlottetown Islanders
- Dartmouth Lakers
- Halifax Atlantics/Canadiens
- Moncton Beavers

== Champions ==
- 1969 Halifax Canadiens
- 1970 Charlottetown Islanders
- 1971 Charlottetown Islanders

== National Playdowns ==
- 1969 Halifax Canadiens Lost Memorial Cup Eastern Quarter-final

Hull Beavers (CJHL) defeated Halifax Canadiens 4-games-to-3 in East Mem Cup Quarter-final

- 1970 Charlottetown Islanders Lost Memorial Cup Eastern Semi-final

Charlottetown Islanders defeated Fredericton Chevies (NBJHL) 3-games-to-1 in Atlantic Final
Charlottetown Islanders defeated Ottawa M&W Rangers (CJHL) 4-games-to-1 in East Mem Cup Quarter-final
Quebec Remparts (QMJHL) defeated Charlottetown Islanders 4-games-to-2 in East Mem Cup Semi-final

- 1971 Charlottetown Islanders Won Hewitt-Dudley Memorial Trophy, Lost Manitoba Centennial Cup Final

Charlottetown Islanders defeated Moncton Hawks (NBJHL) 4-games-to-none in East QF
Charlottetown Islanders defeated Thunder Bay Marrs (TBJHL) 4-games-to-1 in East SF
Charlottetown Islanders defeated Detroit Jr. Red Wings (SOJHL) 4-games-to-2 in East Final (Wins HDMT)
Red Deer Rustlers (AJHL) defeated Charlottetown Islanders 4-games-to-2 in Centennial Cup Final
