= Island Junior Hockey League (1973–1991) =

Canadian junior ice hockey league

Island Junior Hockey League
Membership	Hockey PEI
Founded	1973 (Promoted)
Ceased	1991
Regional Champions	6
National Champions	0
First Champion	Charlottetown Colonels (1974)
Last Champion	Charlottetown Abbies (1991)

The Island Junior Hockey League (IJHL), also sometimes called the PEI Junior A Hockey League, was a Junior ice hockey league in Prince Edward Island, Canada. Originally Junior B, the league was promoted to Junior A in 1973 after the folding of the Charlottetown Islanders in 1972.

== History ==
The league was promoted to Junior A in 1973. Most of the teams originated from the Island Junior B Hockey League, except for the Charlottetown Abbies who played the previous season in the Central New Brunswick Junior B Hockey League. In its early years, their champions would play the winners of the New Brunswick Junior Hockey League, Eastern Junior A Hockey League, and Newfoundland Junior A Hockey League for advancement in the Centennial Cup playdowns.

In 1989, the Summerside Western Capitals hosted the Canadian Junior A Championship, then known as the Manitoba Centennial Cup, and represented the IJHL at the tourney. The Western Capitals came in second place, losing to the Thunder Bay Flyers of the United States Hockey League 4–1 in the final after beating the Moncton Hawks 3–2 in a triple-overtime thriller in the semi-final.

In 1991, the IJHL folded when two teams, Charlottetown Abbies and Summerside Western Capitals, jumped to the Metro Valley Junior Hockey League (MVJHL). The MVJHL immediately changed its name to the Maritime Junior A Hockey League (MJAHL) – a tribute to the short-lived Maritime Junior A Hockey League (1968–1971).

In 1996, a new Island Junior Hockey League was founded at the Junior B level.

== Teams ==
- Charlottetown Abbies
- Charlottetown Colonels
- Eastern Huskies
- Monague Kings
- North River North Stars
- O'Leary Maroons
- Riverview Buccaneers
- Saint John Schooners
- Sherwood-Parkdale Metros
- Summerside Western Capitals
- West Prince Bluefins

== Champions ==
Jr. B

1972 Summerside Crystals
1973

Jr. A

1974 Charlottetown Colonels
1975 Charlottetown Colonels
1976 Charlottetown Colonels
1977 Charlottetown Generals
1978 Charlottetown Eagles
1979 Sherwood-Parkdale Metros
1980 Sherwood-Parkdale Metros
1981 Sherwood-Parkdale Metros
1982 North River North Stars
1983 Sherwood-Parkdale Metros
1984 Summerside Western Capitals
1985 Charlottetown Eagles
1986 Summerside Western Capitals
1987 Charlottetown Abbies
1988 Summerside Western Capitals
1989 Summerside Western Capitals
1990 Charlottetown Abbies
1991 Charlottetown Abbies

== See also ==
- List of ice hockey teams in Prince Edward Island
