= Quebec Junior A Hockey League =

Junior ice hockey league in Quebec (1972–82)

Quebec Junior "A" Hockey League
Membership	Hockey Quebec
Founded	1972
Ceased	1982
Regional Champions	0
National Champions	0
First Champion	St. Jerome Alouettes (1973)
Last Champion	La Prairie Flames (1982)

The Quebec Junior A Hockey League (QJAHL) was a Canadian junior ice hockey league based in Quebec that operated from 1972 until 1982. The QJAHL was a member of Hockey Quebec and the Canadian Amateur Hockey Association and was eligible for the Dudley Hewitt Cup and Centennial Cup.

== History ==
The Quebec Junior A Hockey League was formed in 1972 to give the province of Quebec an entry in the Canadian Amateur Hockey Association's Centennial Cup playoffs.

Luc Tardif finished the 1972–73 season as the top scorer and most valuable player in the east division of the QJAHL.

In 1982, the QJAHL folded. During the final 1981–1982 season, there were only four teams left in the league: the Joliette Cyclones, the Pierrefonds Pirates, the St. Eustache Patriotes and the La Prairie Flames. Quebec would not see Junior "A" hockey again until the Black Lake Miners jumped from Junior "B" into the 1988 Dudley Hewitt Cup playoffs. A year later the Quebec Provincial Junior Hockey League was formed.

== Teams ==
- Beauport Cascades
- Cape Madeleine Barons
- Granby Vics
- Grand'Mere
- Joliette Cyclones
- La Prairie Flames
- La Tuque Wolves
- Lac Megantic Royals
- Lachine
- Longueuil Rebels
- Pierrefonds Pirates
- Rosemont Bombardiers
- St. Eustache Patriotes
- St. Foy Roosters
- St. Jean
- St. Jerome Alouettes
- Thetford Mines Fleur de Lys
- Waterloo Maroons

== Champions ==
- 1973 St. Jerome Alouettes
- 1974 Lac-Megantic Royals
- 1975 St. Jerome Alouettes
- 1976 Lac-Megantic Royals
- 1977 La Tuque Wolves
- 1978 Thetford Mines Fleur de Lys
- 1979 Thetford Mines Fleur de Lys
- 1980 Joliette Cyclones
- 1981 Joliette Cyclones
- 1982 La Prairie Flames
