= Doyle Cup =

Canadian junior ice hockey trophy

- Sport: Ice hockey
- League: Canadian Junior Hockey League
- Awarded for: Pacific region champion
- Country: Canada

History
- First award: 1985 (Pacific Centennial Cup 1971–84)
- Most wins: Vernon Vipers (8)
- Most recent: Prince George Spruce Kings (2019)

The Doyle Cup is an ice hockey trophy that was won through a best-of-7 series conducted annually by the Canadian Junior Hockey League to determine the Pacific region berth in the Centennial Cup, the national Junior A championship. From 1971 to 2021, the series was played between the Fred Page Cup champions of the British Columbia Hockey League (BCHL) and the Enerflex Cup champions of the Alberta Junior Hockey League (AJHL), except from 2013 to 2017 when it was replaced by the four-province Western Canada Cup. Its future status is uncertain because of format changes to the national championship and the BCHL's withdrawal from the CJHL after the 2020–21 season. The current trophy was donated in 1984 by Pete Doyle, a Penticton businessman, replacing the Pacific Centennial Cup that two leagues competed for from 1971 to 1984.

The Pacific region's Doyle Cup Champion traditionally played the Western region's ANAVET Cup champion for the Abbott Cup, the Western Canadian Championship. However, the Abbott Cup diminished in importance following the reorganization of the national championship in 1990. The Abbott Cup was then presented to the winner of the round-robin game, between the Pacific champion and Western champion, during the larger Royal Cup competition; this practice ended, and the Abbott Cup was retired, after the 1999 season.

== Champions ==
- The BCHL was known as the BCJHL until 1990
- Also in 1976, 1977, and 1979 a PCJHL champion defeated the BCJHL champion at the Mowatt Cup to advance to this round.
- **Bolded** are the champions.

**Pacific Junior "A" Champions**
Year	AJHL Champion	BCHL Champion	Series
Pacific Centennial Cup Championship
1971	**Red Deer Rustlers**	Penticton Broncos	4–3
1972	**Red Deer Rustlers**	Vernon Essos	4–2
1973	Calgary Canucks	**Penticton Broncos**	1–4
1974	Red Deer Rustlers	**Kelowna Buckaroos**	1–4
1975	**Spruce Grove Mets**	Bellingham Blazers	4–2
1976	**Spruce Grove Mets**	Nor'Wes Caps (PCJHL)	4–1
1977	**Calgary Canucks**	Richmond Sockeyes (PCJHL)	4–1
1978	Calgary Canucks	**Merritt Centennials**	2–4
1979	**Fort Saskatchewan Traders**	Richmond Sockeyes (PCJHL)	4–1
1980	**Red Deer Rustlers**	Penticton Knights	4–0
1981	**St. Albert Saints**	Penticton Knights	4–1
1982	**St. Albert Saints**	Penticton Knights	4–3
1983	Calgary Canucks	**Abbotsford Flyers**	0–4
1984	Fort Saskatchewan Traders	**Langley Eagles**	2–4
Doyle Cup
1985	Red Deer Rustlers	**Penticton Knights**	1–4
1986	Calgary Canucks	**Penticton Knights**	1–4
1987	Red Deer Rustlers	**Richmond Sockeyes**	3–4
1988	**Calgary Canucks**	Vernon Lakers	4–0
1989	Red Deer Rustlers	**Vernon Lakers**	2–4
1990	Calgary Canucks	**New Westminster Royals**	0–4
1991	Calgary Royals	**Vernon Lakers**	1–4
1992	Olds Grizzlys	**Vernon Lakers**	3–4
1993	Olds Grizzlys	**Kelowna Spartans**	1–4
1994	**Olds Grizzlys**	Kelowna Spartans	4–2
1995	**Calgary Canucks**	Chilliwack Chiefs	4–3
1996	St. Albert Saints	**Vernon Vipers**	3–4
1997	Fort McMurray Oil Barons	**South Surrey Eagles**	1–4
1998	St. Albert Saints	**South Surrey Eagles**	2–4
1999	Calgary Canucks	**Vernon Vipers**	1–4
2000	**Fort McMurray Oil Barons**	Chilliwack Chiefs	4–1
2001	**Camrose Kodiaks**	Victoria Salsa	4–2
2002	Drayton Valley Thunder	**Chilliwack Chiefs**	2–4
2003	**Camrose Kodiaks**	Vernon Vipers	4–2
2004	Grande Prairie Storm	**Nanaimo Clippers**	1–4
2005	**Camrose Kodiaks**	Surrey Eagles	4–1
2006	Fort McMurray Oil Barons	**Burnaby Express**	2–4
2007	**Camrose Kodiaks**	Nanaimo Clippers	4–1
2008	**Camrose Kodiaks**	Penticton Vees	4–1
2009	Grande Prairie Storm	**Vernon Vipers**	0–4
2010	Spruce Grove Saints	**Vernon Vipers**	3–4
2011	Spruce Grove Saints	**Vernon Vipers**	3–4
2012	Brooks Bandits	**Penticton Vees**	1–4
2013-2017: replaced by Western Canada Cup
2018	Spruce Grove Saints	**Wenatchee Wild**	1–4
2019	Brooks Bandits	**Prince George Spruce Kings**	2–4
2020-2022: not awarded due to COVID-19 pandemic (Note: Hockey Canada and the CJHL cancelled the 2020 and 2021 Doyle Cups in response to the coronavirus pandemic. The 2022 Doyle Cup was not played due to elimination of regional playoffs by Hockey Canada.)

== Results by team ==
- results as of 2012 Doyle Cup

Team	League	Champions	Runners-up	Total
Vernon Essos/Lakers/Vipers	BCHL	8	3	11
Camrose Kodiaks	AJHL	5		5
Penticton Broncos/Vees/Knights/Vees	BCHL	4	5	9
Spruce Grove Mets/St. Albert Saints/Spruce Grove Saints	AJHL	4	5	9
Calgary Canucks	AJHL	3	6	9
Red Deer Rustlers	AJHL	3	4	7
New Westminster Royals/South Surrey Eagles/Surrey Eagles	BCHL	3	1	4
Fort McMurray Oil Barons	AJHL	1	2	3
Olds Grizzlys	AJHL	1	2	3
Chilliwack Chiefs	BCHL	1	2	3
Richmond Sockeyes	BCHL/PJHL	1	2	3
Fort Saskatchewan Traders	AJHL	1	1	2
Kelowna Spartans	BCHL	1	1	2
Nanaimo Clippers	BCHL	1	1	2
Abbotsford Flyers	BCHL	1		1
Burnaby Express	BCHL	1		1
Kelowna Buckaroos	BCHL	1		1
Langley Eagles	BCHL	1		1
Merritt Centennials	BCHL	1		1
Wenatchee Wild	BCHL	1		1
Grande Prairie Storm	AJHL		2	2
Brooks Bandits	AJHL		1	1
Calgary Royals	AJHL		1	1
Drayton Valley Thunder	AJHL		1	1
Bellingham Blazers	BCHL		1	1
Nor'Wes Caps	PJHL		1	1
Victoria Salsa	BCHL		1	1

== Results by league ==
- results as of 2012 Doyle Cup

League	Champions	Runners-up	Total
British Columbia Hockey League	25	15	40
Alberta Junior Hockey League	18	25	43
Pacific Junior A Hockey League	0	3	3

== Alberta/British Columbia Junior "A" Championship (1962–1970) ==
Prior to the 1970–71 season, the winner of this series was a part of the Memorial Cup playoffs.

- 1970 Not Contested*
- 1969 Lethbridge Sugar Kings (AJHL)
- 1968 Penticton Broncos (BCJHL)
- 1967 New Westminster Royals (PCJHL)
- 1966 Edmonton Oil Kings (AJHL)
- 1965 Edmonton Oil Kings (AJHL)
- 1964 Edmonton Oil Kings (AJHL)
- 1963 Edmonton Oil Kings (AJHL)
- 1962 Edmonton Oil Kings (AJHL)

(*) The AJHL Champion did not challenge the BCJHL Champion for the right to appear in the Abbott Cup.
