= New Brunswick Junior Hockey League (1969–1983) =

Former junior ice hockey league

New Brunswick Junior Hockey League
Membership	Hockey New Brunswick
Founded
Ceased	1983
Regional Champions	1
National Champions	0
First Champion	Fredericton Chevies (1970)
Last Champion	Moncton Hawks (1983)

The New Brunswick Junior Hockey League (NBJHL) was a Canadian Junior ice hockey league in the province of New Brunswick. The NBJHL was in competition for the Callaghan Cup and Centennial Cup as a Junior A league.

== History ==
The NBJHL was the premier Jr. A league of the province of New Brunswick. In 1970, the league was relegated to Tier II Junior A and competition for the Centennial Cup. In 1982–83, the league was in direct competition for fans with the American Hockey League, who put two of their semi-professional teams in the NBJHL's Jr. A markets. In 1983, the Fredericton Red Wings folded, leaving the Moncton Hawks as the only strong team in the league. Instead of continuing on in the depleted NBJHL, the Hawks elected to move to Nova Scotia's Jr. A league, the Metro Valley Junior Hockey League. The NBJHL folded in 1983.

The core of the league through its entirety seems to have been the Moncton Beavers and teams from Fredericton, like the Fredericton Chevies, Fredericton High School, and Fredericton Red Wings.

== Teams ==
- Blacks Harbour Silverkings
- Cap-Pele Fishermen
- Edmundston Eskimos
- Fredericton Chevies
- Fredericton High School Black Kats
- Fredericton Jr. North Stars
- Fredericton Red Wings
- Moncton Beavers
- Port City Mariners
- Riverview Blues
- Riverview Reds
- Saint John 77's
- Saint John Stingers
- Sussex Royals
- University de Moncton Blue Eagles

== Champions ==
- 1970 Fredericton Chevies
- 1971 Moncton Beavers
- 1972 Moncton Beavers
- 1973 Moncton Beavers
- 1974 Moncton Beavers
- 1975 Cap-Pele Fishermen
- 1976 Saint John 77's
- 1977 Fredericton Red Wings
- 1978 Fredericton Red Wings
- 1979 Fredericton Red Wings
- 1980 Moncton Beavers
- 1981 Moncton Beavers
- 1982 Moncton Hawks
- 1983 Moncton Hawks
