= Westfort Hurricanes =

- City: Fort William, Ontario
- League: Thunder Bay Junior A Hockey League; Midwest Junior Hockey League; Can-Am Junior Hockey League
- Operated: 1940–1980
- Home arena: Fort William Gardens

Franchise history
- 1940-1961: Fort William Hurricane-Rangers
- 1961-1966: Fort William Hurricanes
- 1966-1972: Westfort Hurricanes
- 1972-1975: Thunder Bay Westfort Hurricanes
- 1975-1978: Degagne Hurricanes
- 1978-1980: Degagne Buccaneers

Previous franchise history
- 1978: merged with Thunder Bay Beavers and Fort William Canadians

The Westfort Hurricanes were a Canadian Junior ice hockey club from Fort William, Ontario. The Herks were members of the Thunder Bay Junior A Hockey League and were Abbott Cup finalists once.

== History ==
In 1972, the Hurricanes broke away from the Thunder Bay Junior A Hockey League to join the St. Paul, Minnesota-based Can-Am Junior Hockey League. A year later, that league became the Midwest Junior Hockey League. The Herks stayed on board for one Midwest Junior season before returning to the TBJHL.

Dave Siciliano coached the Hurricanes during the 1973–74 season. His team completed the regular season in first place with 45 wins in 60 games. In the 1974 Centennial Cup playoffs, the Hurricanes defeated the Wexford Raiders four games to three in the first round, then were defeated four games to three by the Smiths Falls Bears in the second round.

The MWJHL later merged and solidified the United States Hockey League. The Buccaneers folded on July 6, 1980, when the TBAHA left them with no league to play in.

== Season-by-season standings ==
Season	GP	W	L	T	OTL	GF	GA	P	Results
1940-41	18	5	11	2	-	89	106	12	3rd TBJHL
1941-42	16	15	1	0	-	110	13	30	1st TBJHL
1942-43	10	9	1	0	-	71	31	18	1st TBJHL
1943-45	did not participate								
1945-46	8	1	7	0	-	15	52	2	5th TBJHL
1946-47	6	4	1	1	-	31	25	9	2nd TBJHL
1947-48	9	3	5	1	-	39	59	7	3rd TBJHL
1948-49	12	3	8	1	-	52	67	7	3rd TBJHL
1949-50	18	11	7	0	-	109	86	22	2nd TBJHL
1950-51	21	11	10	0	-	100	85	22	3rd TBJHL
1951-52	30	15	14	1	-	140	127	31	3rd TBJHL
1952-53	29	11	18	0	-	129	161	22	3rd TBJHL
1953-54	34	10	23	1	-	114	180	21	4th TBJHL
1954-55	29	8	20	1	-	97	143	17	4th TBJHL
1955-56	33	3	27	3	-	88	167	9	3rd TBJHL
1956-57	30	2	28	0	-	95	241	4	3rd TBJHL
1957-58	22	4	17	1	-	66	126	9	3rd TBJHL
1958-59	24	6	14	4	-	82	128	16	3rd TBJHL
1959-60	20	13	7	0	-	94	76	26	1st TBJHL
1960-61	24	5	15	4	-	77	108	14	3rd TBJHL
1961-62	28	2	24	2	-	77	186	6	3rd TBJHL
1962-63	28	9	17	2	-	92	127	20	3rd TBJHL
1963-64	26	8	12	6	-	87	103	22	3rd TBJHL
1964-65	22	1	19	2	-	93	189	4	4th TBJHL
1965-66	30	3	26	1	-	112	226	7	4th TBJHL
1966-67	29	7	19	3	-	118	172	17	4th TBJHL
1967-68	32	11	19	2	-	134	187	27.5	4th TBJHL
1968-69	36	23	8	5	-	196	129	51	1st TBJHL
1969-70	30	13	14	3	-	156	160	29	2nd TBJHL
1970-71	30	13	14	3	-	133	156	29	2nd TBJHL
1971-72	27	14	11	2	-	--	--	30	2nd TBMJHL
1972-73	31	5	21	5	-	94	178	15	4th CAJHL
1973-74	60	45	14	1	-	430	258	91	2nd MWJHL
1974-75	27	19	4	4	-	164	106	42	1st TBJHL
1975-76	30	19	6	5	-	163	117	43	2nd TBJHL
1976-77	25	14	9	2	-	168	122	30	2nd TBJHL
1977-78	28	20	6	2	-	--	--	42	1st TBJHL
1978-79	25	16	6	3	-	--	--	35	1st TBJHL
1979-80	34	24	10	0	-	216	163	48	1st TBJHL

=== Playoffs ===
- 1971 Lost final

Westfort Hurricanes defeated Fort William Canadians 3-games-to-2
Thunder Bay Marrs defeated Westfort Hurricanes 4-games-to-1

- 1972 Lost semi-final

Minnesota Jr. Stars defeated Westfort Hurricanes 2-games-to-none

- 1973 Lost quarter-final/Canadian TBAHA Semi-final

Thunder Bay Centennials defeated Westfort Hurricanes 4-games-to-2

- 1974 Won TBAHA Jack Adams Trophy final, lost Hewitt-Dudley Memorial Trophy final

Thunder Bay Hurricanes defeated Thunder Bay Eagles (TBJHL) 3-games-to-none
Thunder Bay Hurricanes defeated Fort William Canadians (TBJHL) 4-games-to-none JACK ADAMS TROPHY CHAMPIONS
Thunder Bay Hurricanes defeated Wexford Raiders (OPJHL) 4-games-to-3
Smiths Falls Bears (CJHL) defeated Thunder Bay Hurricanes 4-games-to-3

- 1975 Lost final

Thunder Bay Hurricanes defeated Thunder Bay Beavers 4-games-to-2
Thunder Bay Eagles defeated Thunder Bay Hurricanes 4-games-to-1

- 1976 Lost semi-final

Thunder Bay Beavers defeated Thunder Bay Hurricanes 4-games-to-2

- 1977 Lost final

Degagne Hurricanes defeated Thunder Bay Beavers 3-games-to-none and 1 tie
Thunder Bay Eagles defeated Degagne Hurricanes 4-games-to-1

- 1978 Won League, lost Hewitt-Dudley Memorial Trophy Quarter-final

Degagne Hurricanes defeated Thunder Bay Beavers 3-games-to-none
Degagne Hurricanes defeated Atikokan Voyageurs 4-games-to-none TBJHL CHAMPIONS
Guelph Platers (OPJHL) defeated Degagne Hurricanes 4-games-to-none

- 1979 Lost final

Thunder Bay North Stars defeated Degagne Buccaneers 4-games-to-1

- 1980 Lost final

Thunder Bay North Stars defeated Degagne Buccaneers 4-games-to-none with 1 tie

== Championships ==
TBJHL Champions:

1942, 1943, 1952, 1960, 1968, 1969, 1970, 1974*, 1978

Abbott Cup Finalists:

1970

Dudley Hewitt Cup/Eastern Centennial Cup Semi-final Champion

1974

(*) denotes: Herks played in MWJHL, rejoined TBJHL for playoffs.

== Notable alumni ==
Fort William Hurricane-Rangers

- Gus Bodnar
- Alex Delvecchio
- Bill Johansen
- Bud Poile

Fort William Hurricanes

- Mike Busniuk
- Larry Cahan
- Dave Gatherum
- Eddie Kachur
- Dennis Owchar
- Don Poile
- Vic Venasky
- Tommy Williams
- Gord Wilson

Westfort Hurricanes

- Lou Nistico
- Murray Wing
- Benny Woit

Thunder Bay Westfort Hurricanes

- Mike Hordy
- Trevor Johansen
