= Fogolin =

Fogolin is a surname. Notable people with the surname include:

- Lee Fogolin Sr. (1927–2000), Canadian ice hockey player
- Lee Fogolin (born 1955), American ice hockey player
