= John Adams (ice hockey, born 1946) =

Canadian ice hockey player (born 1946)

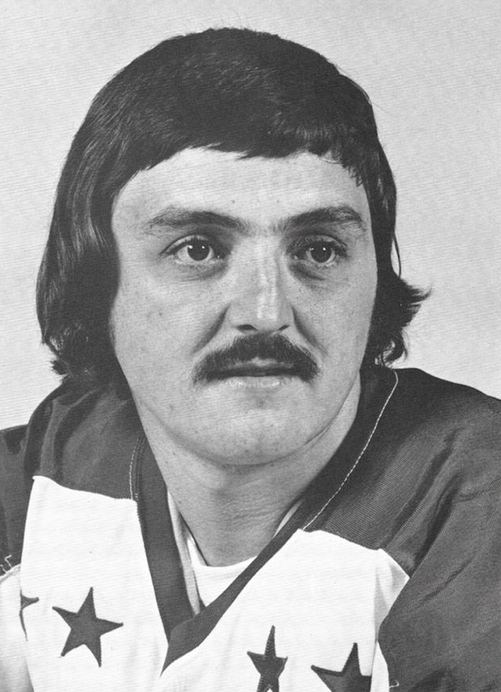
- Adams in 1974 photo
- Born: July 27, 1946 (age 79) Port Arthur, Ontario, Canada
- Height: 6 ft 0 in (183 cm)
- Weight: 200 lb (91 kg; 14 st 4 lb)
- Position: Goaltender
- Caught: Left
- Played for: Boston Bruins; Washington Capitals
- Playing career: 1967–1976

John Matthew Adams (born July 27, 1946) is a Canadian former professional ice hockey goaltender who played 22 games in the National Hockey League for the Boston Bruins and Washington Capitals between 1972 and 1975. He was born in Port Arthur, Ontario.

== Early life ==
A native of Port Arthur, Ontario, Adams played junior hockey with his hometown Port Arthur team. He is one of the only players to appear in four consecutive Memorial Cup tournaments.

== Career ==
In 1967, Adams signed with the Boston Bruins of the National Hockey League. Assigned to the minor league Dayton Gems of the International Hockey League, Adams played two seasons with the Gems, winning the leading goaltending award in 1969. In the fall of 1969, he was assigned to the Bruins' leading farm team at the time, the Oklahoma City Blazers of the Central Hockey League, for whom he played for the next two seasons, winning honors as a league first-team all-star in 1972.

During the 1970 playoffs, Adams was recalled to the Bruins as a reserve to back up regular goaltenders Gerry Cheevers and Ed Johnston. He did not play a game, yet the Bruins decided to engrave his name on the Stanley Cup upon winning the championship, making him one of the few players to have his name on the Stanley Cup before playing an NHL game.

Adams would not play his first NHL game for another three seasons. In 1972–73, with Cheevers gone to the World Hockey Association and disruption in the Boston net, he played fourteen games for the defending champion Bruins while splitting his time with the new Bruins' affiliate Boston Braves of the American Hockey League.

Traded to the minor-league San Diego Gulls of the Western Hockey League the following year, Adams won second-team all-star honors before being sold to the Washington Capitals in 1974. He played only eight games with the Capitals, again splitting the season between the NHL and the minor leagues.

Adams was named a player-coach for the Thunder Bay Twins of the Ontario Senior League the following year, before retiring as a player five seasons later, settling in the Thunder Bay area in retirement. His final position in professional hockey was as an assistant coach for the Thunder Bay Thunder Hawks of the Colonial Hockey League in 1991.

== Career statistics ==
=== Regular season and playoffs ===
| | | | Regular season | | | | | | | | | Playoffs |
| Season | Team | League | GP | W | L | T | MIN | GA | SO | GAA | SV% | GP | W | L | MIN | GA | SO | GAA | SV% |
|---|---|---|---|---|---|---|---|---|---|---|---|---|---|---|---|---|---|---|---|
| 1963–64 | Port Arthur North Stars | TBJHL | — | — | — | — | — | — | — | — | — | — | — | — | — | — | — | — | — |
| 1963–64 | Port Arthur North Stars | M-Cup | — | — | — | — | — | — | — | — | — | 6 | 3 | 3 | 360 | 25 | 0 | 4.17 | — |
| 1964–65 | Port Arthur North Stars | TBJHL | 22 | 13 | 8 | 1 | 1320 | 88 | 0 | 4.00 | — | — | — | — | — | — | — | — | — |
| 1964–65 | Port Arthur North Stars | M-Cup | — | — | — | — | — | — | — | — | — | 5 | 1 | 3 | 250 | 25 | 0 | 6.00 | — |
| 1965–66 | Port Arthur North Stars | TBJHL | 26 | 18 | 6 | 2 | 1530 | 93 | 0 | 3.65 | — | — | — | — | — | — | — | — | — |
| 1965–66 | Fort William Canadiens | M-Cup | — | — | — | — | — | — | — | — | — | 11 | 6 | 4 | 630 | 33 | 0 | 3.14 | — |
| 1966–67 | Port Arthur Marrs | TBJHL | 30 | 20 | 8 | 2 | 1800 | 114 | 3 | 3.80 | — | — | — | — | — | — | — | — | — |
| 1966–67 | Port Arthur Marrs | M-Cup | — | — | — | — | — | — | — | — | — | 19 | 11 | 8 | 1160 | 71 | 1 | 3.67 | — |
| 1967–68 | Dayton Gems | IHL | 45 | — | — | — | 2570 | 148 | 2 | 3.46 | — | 4 | — | — | 240 | 21 | 0 | 5.25 | — |
| 1968–69 | Dayton Gems | IHL | 32 | — | — | — | 1900 | 91 | 2 | 2.87 | — | 6 | — | — | 365 | 15 | 1 | 2.47 | — |
| 1969–70 | Oklahoma City Blazers | CHL | 51 | 18 | 26 | 7 | 3027 | 176 | 5 | 3.49 | — | — | — | — | — | — | — | — | — |
| 1970–71 | Oklahoma City Blazers | CHL | 57 | 25 | 22 | 10 | 3417 | 195 | 3 | 3.42 | — | 5 | 1 | 4 | 280 | 21 | 0 | 4.50 | — |
| 1971–72 | Oklahoma City Blazers | CHL | 43 | 15 | 15 | 3 | 2168 | 129 | 2 | 3.57 | — | — | — | — | — | — | — | — | — |
| 1972–73 | Boston Bruins | NHL | 14 | 9 | 3 | 1 | 780 | 39 | 1 | 3.00 | .906 | — | — | — | — | — | — | — | — |
| 1972–73 | Boston Braves | AHL | 23 | — | — | — | 1179 | 65 | 1 | 3.31 | — | 8 | 4 | 4 | 420 | 34 | 0 | 4.86 | — |
| 1973–74 | San Diego Gulls | WHL | 69 | 38 | 26 | 4 | 4094 | 223 | 1 | 3.27 | .904 | 4 | 0 | 4 | 261 | 19 | 0 | 4.37 | — |
| 1974–75 | Washington Capitals | NHL | 8 | 0 | 7 | 0 | 400 | 46 | 0 | 6.90 | .833 | — | — | — | — | — | — | — | — |
| 1974–75 | Richmond Robins | AHL | 28 | 7 | 13 | 3 | 1424 | 105 | 1 | 4.42 | .869 | — | — | — | — | — | — | — | — |
| 1975–76 | Thunder Bay Twins | OHA Sr | 12 | — | — | — | 720 | 33 | 3 | 2.75 | — | — | — | — | — | — | — | — | — |
| 1976–77 | Thunder Bay Twins | TBSHL | — | — | — | — | — | — | — | — | — | — | — | — | — | — | — | — | — |
| 1977–78 | Thunder Bay Twins | TBSHL | — | — | — | — | — | — | — | — | — | — | — | — | — | — | — | — | — |
| 1978–79 | Thunder Bay Twins | TBSHL | — | — | — | — | — | — | — | — | — | — | — | — | — | — | — | — | — |
| 1979–80 | Thunder Bay Twins | TBSHL | — | — | — | — | — | — | — | — | — | — | — | — | — | — | — | — | — |
| NHL totals | | | 22 | 9 | 10 | 1 | 1180 | 85 | 1 | 4.32 | .877 | — | — | — | — | — | — | — | — |
