= Vic Venasky =

Canadian ice hockey player

- Born: March 6, 1951 (age 74); Thunder Bay, Ontario, Canada
- Height: 5 ft 11 in (180 cm)
- Weight: 185 lb (84 kg; 13 st 3 lb)
- Position: Centre
- Shot: Right
- Played for: Los Angeles Kings; HC Davos
- NHL draft: 34th overall, 1971; Los Angeles Kings
- Playing career: 1972–1980

Victor William Venasky (born March 6, 1951) is a Canadian former professional ice hockey player. He played in the National Hockey League with the Los Angeles Kings between 1972 and 1979.

== Career ==
As a junior, Venasky played on the Port Arthur Marrs who made it to the Memorial Cup finals in 1967. After playing college hockey at the University of Denver, Venasky went on to play 430 games in the National Hockey League with the Los Angeles Kings. He now coaches youth hockey and runs an equipment rental shop in Southern California.

== Career statistics ==
=== Regular season and playoffs ===
			Regular season					Playoffs
Season	Team	League	GP	G	A	Pts	PIM	GP	G	A	Pts	PIM
1966–67	Port Arthur Marrs	TBJHL	—	—	—	—	—	5	1	0	1	0
1966–67	Port Arthur Marrs	M-Cup	—	—	—	—	—	6	0	1	1	0
1967–68	Port Arthur Marrs	TBJHL	24	16	17	33	0	—	—	—	—	—
1968–69	Port Arthur Marrs	TBJHL	36	29	34	63	4	—	—	—	—	—
1968–69	Fort William Hurricanes	M-Cup	—	—	—	—	—	6	7	5	12	12
1969–70	Port Arthur Marrs	TBJHL	22	27	20	47	0	—	—	—	—	—
1969–70	Fort William Hurricanes	M-Cup	—	—	—	—	—	12	8	12	20	6
1969–70	Weyburn Red Wings	M-Cup	—	—	—	—	—	4	2	4	6	0
1970–71	University of Denver	WCHA	36	20	36	56	12	—	—	—	—	—
1971–72	University of Denver	WCHA	21	20	26	46	8	—	—	—	—	—
1972–73	Los Angeles Kings	NHL	77	15	19	34	10	—	—	—	—	—
1973–74	Los Angeles Kings	NHL	32	6	5	11	12	—	—	—	—	—
1973–74	Springfield Kings	AHL	21	8	15	23	8	—	—	—	—	—
1973–74	Portland Buckaroos	WHL	10	1	11	12	4	9	7	2	9	8
1974–75	Los Angeles Kings	NHL	17	1	2	3	0	—	—	—	—	—
1974–75	Fort Worth Texans	CHL	14	5	11	16	6	—	—	—	—	—
1974–75	Springfield Indians	AHL	6	2	2	4	4	—	—	—	—	—
1975–76	Los Angeles Kings	NHL	80	18	26	44	12	9	0	1	1	6
1976–77	Los Angeles Kings	NHL	80	14	26	40	18	9	1	4	5	6
1977–78	Los Angeles Kings	NHL	71	3	10	13	6	1	0	0	0	0
1978–79	Los Angeles Kings	NHL	73	4	13	17	8	2	0	0	0	0
1979–80	Binghamton Dusters	AHL	80	25	31	66	22	—	—	—	—	—
1980–81	HC Davos	NLA	—	—	—	—	—	—	—	—	—	—
1980–81	Thunder Bay Twins	CA-SH	—	—	—	—	—	—	—	—	—	—
NHL totals			430	61	101	162	66	21	1	5	6	12

== Awards and honours ==
Award	Year
All-WCHA Second Team	1970–71
AHCA West All-American	1970–71
