= 1967 Memorial Cup =

Canadian junior ice hockey championship

Tournament details
- Dates: May 1967
- Teams: 11

Final positions
- Champions: Toronto Marlboros (OHA) (5th title)

The Memorial Cup trophy

The 1967 Memorial Cup was the 49th annual Memorial Cup competition, organized by the Canadian Amateur Hockey Association (CAHA) to determine the champion of junior A ice hockey. The George Richardson Memorial Trophy champions Toronto Marlboros of the Ontario Hockey Association in Eastern Canada competed against the Abbott Cup champions Port Arthur Marrs of the Thunder Bay Junior Hockey League in Western Canada. In a best-of-seven series, held at Fort William Gardens in Fort William, Ontario, Toronto won their fifth Memorial Cup, defeating Port Arthur 4 games to 1.

== Scores ==
- Game 1: Toronto 6-3 Port Arthur
- Game 2: Toronto 8-4 Port Arthur
- Game 3: Port Arthur 6-4 Toronto
- Game 4: Toronto 6-0 Port Arthur
- Game 5: Toronto 6-3 Port Arthur

== Winning roster ==
Doug Acomb, Fred Barrett, Richie Bayes, Jim Blain, Mike Byers, Terry Caffrey, Cam Crosby, Gord Davies, Gary Edwards, Chris Evans, Brian Glennie, Frank Hamill, Ken Kelly, Steve King, Tom Martin, Gerry Meehan, Cam Newton, Al Osborne, Brad Park, Mike Pelyk, Bob Whidden, John Wright. Coach: Gus Bodnar

== National playoffs ==
Opening Round | Quarter-finals
BC | New Westminster | 4
AB | Edmonton | 3
BC | New Westminster | 4
SK | Saskatoon | 2
Western Canada
MB | Flin Flon | 3
NWO | Port Arthur | 4
NWO | Geraldton | 0
NWO | Port Arthur | 3
Eastern Canada
NEO | Sault Ste. Marie | 3
EO | Cornwall | 4
EO | Cornwall | 1
QC | Thetford Mines | 4
QC | Thetford Mines | 4
AC | Halifax | 2

Semi-finals
BC | New Westminster | 1
NWO | Port Arthur | 4
SO | Toronto | 3
QC | Thetford Mines | 1

Memorial Cup
NWO | Port Arthur | 1
SO | Toronto | 4

=== Additional Interleague Playdowns ===
Moncton Seals defeated Fredericton Red Wings 3-games-to-2 (New Brunswick Final)
Halifax Canadiens defeated North Sydney Victorias 4-games-to-0 (Nova Scotia Final)
Halifax Canadiens defeated Moncton Seals 4-games-to-1 (Atlantic Canada Final)
Verdun Maple Leafs defeated Dolbeau Castors 3-games-to-2 (Quebec SF)
Thetford Mines Canadiens defeated Verdun Maple Leafs 3-games-to-1 (Quebec Final)
New Westminster Royals defeated Trail Smoke Eaters 3-games-to-0 (British Columbia Semi Final)
New Westminster Royals defeated Penticton Broncos 4-games-to-0 (British Columbia Final)

== Roll of League Champions ==
Western Canada - Abbott Cup playdowns

British Columbia (BC)

- PCJHL: New Westminster Royals
- KIHL: Trail Smoke Eaters
- OJHL: Penticton Broncos

Alberta (AB)

- AJHL: Edmonton Movers

Saskatchewan (SK)

- SJHL: Saskatoon Macs

Manitoba (MB)

- MJHL: Flin Flon Bombers

Northwestern Ontario (NWO)

- TBJHL: Port Arthur Marrs
- NWOJHL: Geraldton Goldminers

Eastern Canada - George Richardson Memorial Trophy playdowns

Ontario (ON)

- Eastern Ontario (EO) - CJHL: Cornwall Royals
- Northeastern Ontario (NEO) - NOJHA: Sault Ste. Marie Greyhounds
- Southern Ontario (SO) - OHA: Toronto Marlboros

Quebec (QC)

- LHJP: Thetford Mines Canadiens
- LHJSLS: Dolbeau Castors
- LHJMM: Verdun Maple Leafs

Atlantic Canada (AC)

- Cape Breton - CBJHL: North Sydney Victorias
- New Brunswick - Moncton Seals (Independent)
- Nova Scotia - Halifax Canadiens (Independent)
