= Fort William Gardens =

Arena in Thunder Bay, Ontario, Canada

Coordinates: 48°23′09″N 89°15′02″W

Fort Williams Gardens

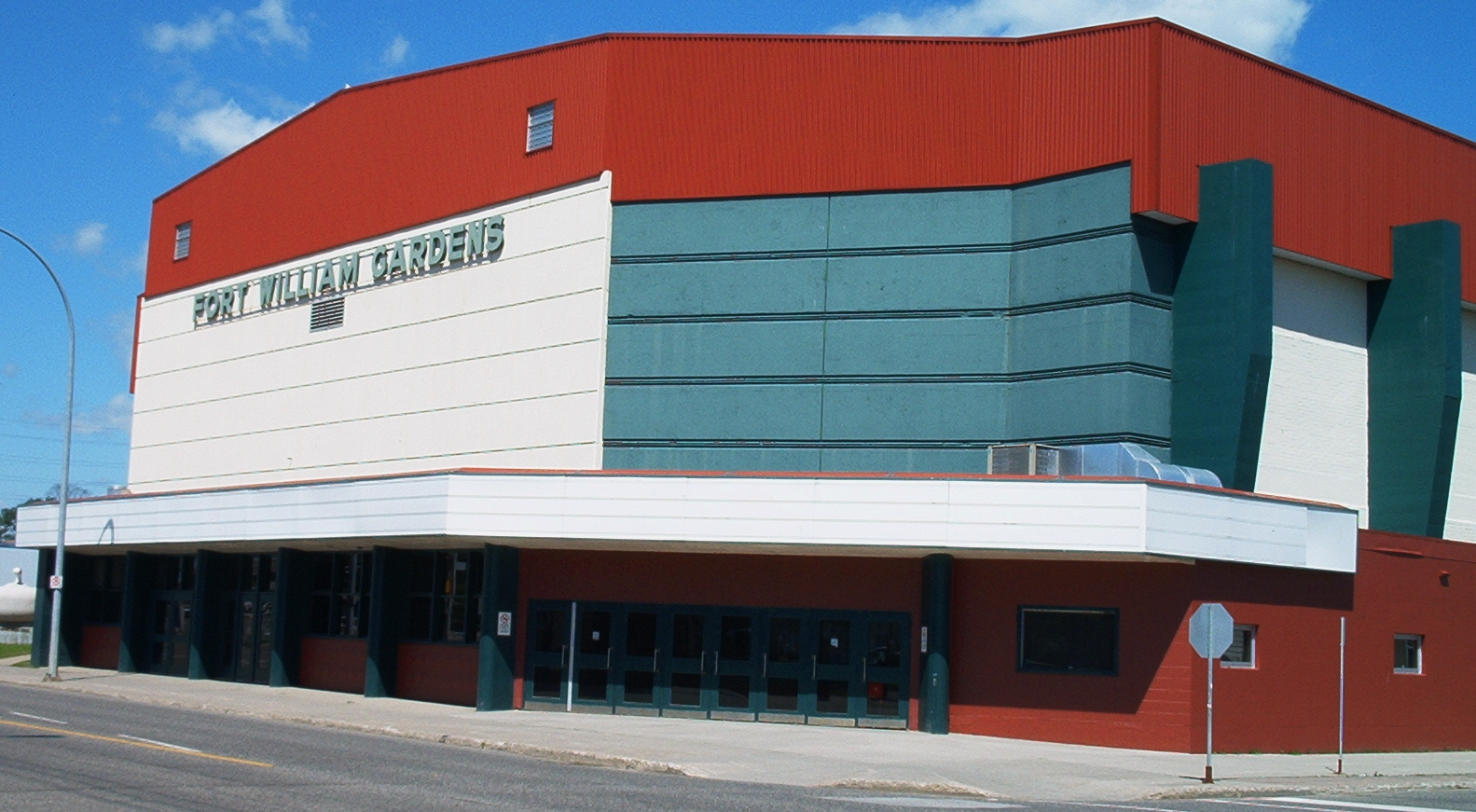
- Interactive map of Fort Williams Gardens
- Location: 901 Miles Street; Thunder Bay, Ontario; P7C 1J9
- Owner: City of Thunder Bay
- Capacity: 4,680
- Public transit: Thunder Bay Transit; 12 16

Construction
- Opened: 6 March 1951
- Renovated: 1995

Tenants
- Current; Thunder Bay North Stars (SIJHL) (2000-present); Lakehead Thunderwolves (U Sports) (2001-Present); Fort William Figure Skating Club (Skate Canada) (1954-Present); Former; Fort William Canadians (TBJHL) (1951-78); Westfort Hurricanes (TBJHL) (1966-72); Thunder Bay Twins (USHL/OHA Sr. A/OHA Sr. A) (1970-91); Thunder Bay Vulcans (TBJHL) (1971-73); Thunder Bay Centennials (CAJHL) (1972-73); Thunder Bay Westfort Hurricanes (CAJHL/MWJHL) (1972-75); Thunder Bay Beavers (CAJHL) (1973-78); Thunder Bay Kings (TBJHL) (1980-84); Thunder Bay Flyers (USHL) (1984-2000); Thunder Bay Hornets (TBJHL/MJHL) (1982-86); Thunder Bay Thunder Hawks/Senators/Thunder Cats (CoHL/UHL) (1991-99); Thunder Bay Twins (HNwO) (2003-04); Thunder Bay Bombers (HNwO) (2004-06); Thunder Bay Hawks (HNwO) (2007-08); Thunder Bay K&A Twins (HNwO) (2008-11)

Website
- Arena Info

The Fort William Gardens is a multi-purpose arena, in Thunder Bay, Ontario, Canada. It opened in 1951.

== History ==
The Gardens opened on March 6, 1951. The Fort William Canadians defeated the Fort William Hurricanes by a 4–2 score in the first game, which was refereed by Fred Page and with a paid attendance of 5,200 tickets.

The isolation of Thunder Bay and travel costs have prevented the Gardens from retaining most teams. It hosted an NHL pre-season game in 1993 between the Ottawa Senators and Washington Capitals, and two pre-season AHL games in 2002 with St. John's Maple Leafs vs. Manitoba Moose, and 2 in 2003 with Manitoba Moose vs. Toronto Roadrunners.

The Gardens has hosted the 1975 Allan Cup, the 1988 Allan Cup, and 1991 Allan Cup, representing the Grand Championship of Canadian Senior hockey. The Gardens played host to the 1967 Memorial Cup series in which the Toronto Marlboros defeated the Port Arthur Marrs for the national junior hockey championship. The Gardens hosted the 1988 Air Canada Cup National Midget Hockey Championship.

=== Tenants ===
Since 2001, the Gardens has been home to the Lakehead Thunderwolves men's university hockey program, and a Superior International Junior Hockey League team. Previous tenants include the Thunder Bay Bulldogs, Fort William North Stars, Thunder Bay Flyers, the Thunder Bay Senators/Thunder Bay Thunder Cats, and the Thunder Bay Twins.

=== Major events ===
The Gardens has also hosted several national curling championships:

- 1960 Macdonald Brier
- 1976 Women's Canadian Junior Curling Championships
- 1991 Canadian Mixed Curling Championships
- 1996 Scott Tournament of Hearts
- 2002 M&M Meat Shops Canadian Open (Grand Slam Event)
- 2022 Scotties Tournament of Hearts
- 2025 Scotties Tournament of Hearts

The arena has hosted Remembrance Day ceremonies, festivals, circuses and many concerts including such artists as The Beach Boys, Johnny and the Hurricanes, Bob Dylan, B.B. King, The Guess Who, John Lee Hooker, Burton Cummings, Roy Orbison, Celine Dion, Willie Nelson, Bee Gees, Rush, REM, AC/DC, Slade, Ted Nugent, Skid Row, The Black Crowes, Foreigner, Bachman-Turner Overdrive, Black Oak Arkansas, Pearl Jam, Our Lady Peace, Nickelback and The Tragically Hip.

== See also ==
- Thunder Bay Community Auditorium
