= Don Johns =

Canadian ice hockey player

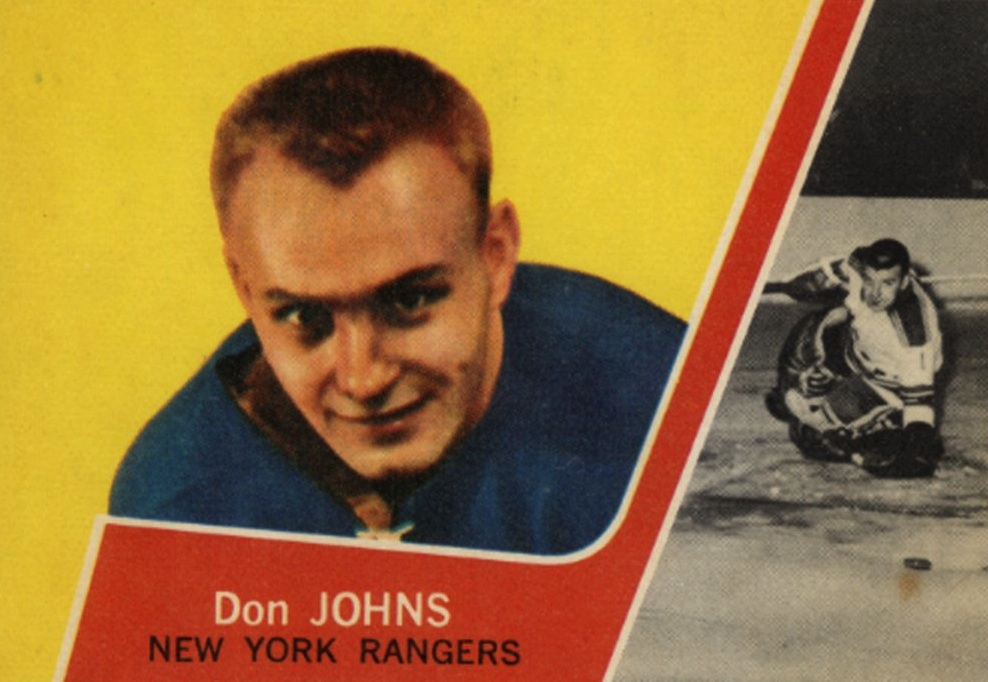
- Born: December 13, 1937 St. George, Ontario, Canada
- Died: July 8, 2017 (aged 79) Pointe-Claire, Quebec, Canada
- Height: 5 ft 11 in (180 cm)
- Weight: 178 lb (81 kg; 12 st 10 lb)
- Position: Defence
- Shot: Right
- Played for: Montreal Canadiens; New York Rangers; Minnesota North Stars
- Playing career: 1956–1969

Donald Ernest Johns (December 13, 1937 – July 8, 2017) was a Canadian professional ice hockey defenceman who played 153 games in the National Hockey League (NHL) for the Montreal Canadiens, New York Rangers, and Minnesota North Stars between 1960 and 1967. He played in the Canadian minor leagues for the Fort William Canadiens and the Winnipeg Warriors (1957 to 1960) before signing with the Rangers, where he teamed with Harry Howell, Bill Gadsby and Lou Fontinato. Johns was on the Minnesota North Stars roster during their inaugural season of 1967–1968. The Canadiens dropped him after a single game, when he left to attend his mother's funeral.

== Personal ==
Johns and his wife Carol were married for 55 years, until his death, and they had a son, Michael and daughter, Kimberly.

== Career statistics ==
=== Regular season and playoffs ===
			Regular season					Playoffs
Season	Team	League	GP	G	A	Pts	PIM	GP	G	A	Pts	PIM
1956–57	Hull-Ottawa Canadiens	QHL	15	0	0	0	0	—	—	—	—	—
1956–57	Hull-Ottawa Canadiens	OHA	27	2	3	5	12	—	—	—	—	—
1956–57	Hull-Ottawa Canadiens	EOHL	8	0	2	2	2	—	—	—	—	—
1956–57	Hull-Ottawa Canadiens	M-Cup	—	—	—	—	—	13	0	0	0	2
1957–58	Fort William Canadiens	TBJHL	50	3	14	17	56	4	1	1	2	8
1957–58	Fort William Canadiens	M-Cup	—	—	—	—	—	5	0	2	2	12
1958–59	Winnipeg Warriors	WHL	60	4	18	22	112	7	1	0	1	18
1959–60	Winnipeg Warriors	WHL	70	3	21	24	72	—	—	—	—	—
1960–61	New York Rangers	NHL	63	1	7	8	34	—	—	—	—	—
1961–62	Springfield Indians	AHL	59	3	10	13	14	11	1	4	5	10
1962–63	New York Rangers	NHL	6	0	4	4	6	—	—	—	—	—
1962–63	Baltimore Clippers	AHL	69	9	17	26	30	3	1	3	4	2
1963–64	New York Rangers	NHL	57	1	9	10	26	—	—	—	—	—
1963–64	Baltimore Clippers	AHL	12	0	1	1	10	—	—	—	—	—
1964–65	New York Rangers	NHL	22	0	1	1	4	—	—	—	—	—
1964–65	Baltimore Clippers	AHL	26	2	10	12	28	9	0	2	2	14
1964–65	St. Louis Braves	CPHL	23	1	5	6	10	—	—	—	—	—
1965–66	Montreal Canadiens	NHL	1	0	0	0	0	—	—	—	—	—
1965–66	Quebec Aces	AHL	63	2	24	26	78	—	—	—	—	—
1966–67	Quebec Aces	AHL	69	1	15	16	54	—	—	—	—	—
1967–68	Minnesota North Stars	NHL	4	0	0	0	6	—	—	—	—	—
1967–68	Memphis South Stars	CPHL	27	0	9	9	22	—	—	—	—	—
1967–68	Rochester Americans	AHL	42	1	13	14	32	11	1	1	2	18
1968–69	Vancouver Canucks	WHL	66	1	22	23	102	7	0	3	3	18
AHL totals			340	18	90	108	246	34	3	10	13	44
NHL totals			153	2	21	23	74	—	—	—	—	—
