= Fort William Canadians =

Canadian junior ice hockey team

- City: Fort William, Ontario, Canada
- League: Thunder Bay Junior A Hockey League; Thunder Bay Junior B Hockey League
- Operated: 1935-1978
- Home arena: Fort William Gardens
- Colours: Red, Blue, White
- Head coach: Unknown

Franchise history
- 1935-1943: Fort William Columbus Club
- 1943-1946: Fort William Columbus Club Millers
- 1946-1949: Fort William Columbus Club Canadiens
- 1949-1968: Fort William Canadiens
- 1968-1978: Fort William Canadians

Previous franchise history
- 1978: merged with Degagne Hurricanes and Thunder Bay Beavers

The Fort William Canadians were a junior ice hockey team based in Fort William, Ontario, Canada. The Canadians were members of the Thunder Bay Junior A Hockey League and were Abbott Cup finalists three times. For a while, the Fort William Canadiens were a development club for the National Hockey League's Montreal Canadiens.

== Season-by-season standings ==
Season	GP	W	L	T	OTL	GF	GA	P	Results
1935-36	15	0	15	0	-	28	83	0	5th TBJHL
1936-37	18	5	11	2	-	--	--	12	3rd TBJHL
1937-38	18	4	13	1	-	--	--	9	4th TBJHL
1938-39	18	11	6	1	-	81	65	23	2nd TBJHL
1939-40	16	8	8	0	-	67	62	16	2nd TBJHL
1940-41	18	5	12	1	-	86	126	11	4th TBJHL
1941-42	14	0	14	0	-	43	118	0	3rd TBJHL
1942-43	10	1	8	1	-	34	72	3	4th TBJHL
1943-44	9	0	9	0	-	--	--	0	4th TBJHL
1944-45	8	0	7	1	-	--	--	1	4th TBJHL
1945-46	7	4	3	0	-	37	33	8	3rd TBJHL
1946-47	6	5	0	1	-	46	20	11	1st TBJHL
1947-48	9	4	4	1	-	65	48	9	2nd TBJHL
1948-49	12	7	4	1	-	79	78	15	2nd TBJHL
1949-50	18	5	13	0	-	66	126	10	3rd TBJHL
1950-51	21	13	8	0	-	90	86	26	2nd TBJHL
1951-52	29	9	19	1	-	130	207	19	4th TBJHL
1952-53	29	20	8	1	-	167	108	41	1st TBJHL
1953-54	35	28	6	1	-	200	84	57	1st TBJHL
1954-55	28	18	9	1	-	135	84	37	1st TBJHL
1955-56	31	21	7	3	-	143	114	45	1st TBJHL
1956-57	30	24	5	1	-	191	94	49	1st TBJHL
1957-58	22	21	0	1	-	143	38	43	1st TBJHL
1958-59	23	15	5	3	-	120	66	33	1st TBJHL
1959-60	20	11	9	0	-	70	71	22	2nd TBJHL
1960-61	24	18	4	2	-	112	69	38	1st TBJHL
1961-62	28	19	8	1	-	155	95	39	1st TBJHL
1962-63	28	15	11	2	-	114	97	32	1st TBJHL
1963-64	26	9	7	10	-	95	75	28	2nd TBJHL
1964-65	24	20	3	1	-	142	81	41	1st TBJHL
1965-66	30	23	4	3	-	185	88	49	1st TBJHL
1966-67	29	14	11	4	-	137	110	32	2nd TBJHL
1967-68	32	13	15	4	-	158	143	31	3rd TBJHL
1968-69	36	16	13	7	-	181	141	39	3rd TBJHL
1969-70	30	17	10	3	-	143	108	37	1st TBJHL
1970-71	30	11	13	6	-	124	127	28	3rd TBJHL
1971-72	26	8	15	3	-	--	--	19	4th TBMJHL
1972-73	22	8	11	3	-	--	--	19	4th TBJHL
1973-74	30	23	6	1	-	210	125	47	1st TBJHL
1974-75	27	6	16	5	-	116	141	17	4th TBJHL
1975-76	30	2	23	5	-	94	194	9	4th TBJHL
1976-77	26	5	20	1	-	104	220	11	4th TBJHL
1977-78	26	9	16	1	-	--	--	19	6th TBJHL

=== Playoffs ===
- 1971 Lost semi-final

Westfort Hurricanes defeated Fort William Canadians 3-games-to-2

- 1972 DNQ
- 1973 Won League Jr. A Crown, lost TBAHA Canadian Final

Fort William Canadians defeated Thunder Bay Eagles 3-games-to-none TBJHL JR. A CHAMPIONS
Thunder Bay Centennials (CAJHL) defeated Fort William Canadians 2-games-to-none

- 1974 Won League, lost TBAHA Jack Adams Trophy final

Fort William Canadians defeated Thunder Bay Beavers 3-games-to-2 TBJHL CHAMPIONS
Thunder Bay Hurricanes (MWJHL) defeated Fort William Canadians 4-games-to-none

- 1975 Lost semi-final

Thunder Bay Eagles defeated Fort William Canadians 4-games-to-2

- 1976 Lost semi-final

Thunder Bay Eagles defeated Fort William Canadians 4-games-to-none

- 1977 Lost semi-final

Thunder Bay Eagles defeated Fort William Canadians 3-games-to-none

- 1978 DNQ

== Championships ==
TBJHL Champions:

1939, 1947, 1953, 1954, 1955, 1957, 1958, 1959, 1961, 1963, 1964, 1966

Abbott Cup Finalists:

1952, 1954, 1957

== Notable players ==
Columbus Club Canadians

- Dave Creighton
- Danny Lewicki

Canadiens

- John Adams
- Stan Baluik
- Rick Bragnalo
- Mike Busniuk
- Ron Busniuk
- Jean Gauthier
- Pete Goegan
- Danny Gruen
- Don Johns
- Eddie Kachur
- Lou Marcon
- Stu McNeill
- Dennis Olson
- Mel Pearson
- John Schella
- Dave Siciliano
- Ralph Stewart
- Joe Szura
- Ted Tucker
- Gary Veneruzzo
- Murray Wing
