= Kenora Thistles (1926–1940) =

Former Canadian ice hockey team

- City: Kenora, Ontario
- League: Manitoba Junior Hockey League; Thunder Bay Junior A Hockey League
- Home arena: Kenora Arena
- Colours: Maroon, White

Championships
- Turnbull Cups: 2 (1934, 1940)
- Jack Adams Trophies: 2 (1928, 1929)
- Abbott Cups: 1 (1940)

The Kenora Thistles were a Manitoba Junior Hockey League team playing in the Canadian town of Kenora, Ontario.

== History ==
The Kenora Thistles junior hockey club was founded in 1925 in a local Northern league with Keewatin and Norman. The Thistles participated in the Thunder Bay regional playoffs as an independent team. In 1927, they moved to the Memorial Cup-eligible Thunder Bay Junior A Hockey League.

The 1926 regional playoffs put them up against Fort Frances in the semi-final. Kenora won the games 5-1 and 6-1 to earn a berth into the region finals. In the final, the Thistles lost to the Fort William Juniors 4-2 and 4-0 to end their season. In 1927, the Thistles squared off with the Port Arthur West End Juniors in a two-game series for the region. Port Arthur won 6-5 and 5-1 to take the series.

The Thistles first season of league play had them win the regular season crown of the TBJHL. In the playoffs, with a direct berth to the league final, the Thistles played the Fort William Juniors. They lost the first game 4-3, but won the second game 5-3 to take the series. In the Memorial Cup Eastern semi-final, the Thistles had to play the Manitoba Junior Hockey League's Elmwood Millionaires. Kenora won both games 3-2 to play in the Eastern final. Up against the Saskatchewan Junior Hockey League's Regina Pats, the Thistles fell 8-0 in game one but only managed to win game two by a score of 4-3, thus eliminating them from a chance at the Memorial Cup.

In their second TBJHL season, the Thistles came in first again. They ended up against the Fort William Juniors in the finals, beating them 1-0 and tying them 2-2 to win the regional playoffs. In the Eastern Memorial Cup semi-final, the Thistles again met up with the MJHL's Elmwood Millionaires. They won game one 4-3, but fell 3-1 in game two and were eliminated.

Their third and final TBJHL season had them finish in second place behind the Fort William Legion. In the semi-final, the Thistles were up against the Port Arthur Juniors. They won game one 3-2, but objected to the second game's refereeing and were ejected from the playoffs by the league. This would be their last game in the TBJHL.

In 1930, the Thistles were accepted into the South Division of the Manitoba Junior Hockey League which would cut back on their travel as all the teams in the South Division were from Winnipeg, Manitoba. After winning the division in just their third season, the Thistles were forcefully moved to the more distant North Division. Despite the travel, the Thistles took their first league title in 1934. The Thistles would end up losing the Abbott Cup semi-final to the Port Arthur West Ends 9-goals-to-8 in two games.

From 1936 until 1939 the Thistles suffered, three consecutive losing seasons left them financially in trouble.

The 1939-40 season was a great season for the Thistles. They won the league by defeating the Elmwood Maple Leafs 3-games-to-none in the league final, then won the Abbott Cup as Western Canadian champions. In the Abbott Cup semi-final, the Thistles defeated the Port Arthur Juniors 2-games-to-1. In the final, they defeated the Edmonton Athletic Club Roamers with 2 wins, 1 loss, and 2 ties. In their first and only Memorial Cup appearance, the Thistles and Oshawa Generals marked the second time two teams from Ontario would square off for the Memorial Cup. The Generals won game one 1-0, and game two 4-1. The Thistles rebounded and won game three 4-3, but lost game four 4-2 and the series 3-games-to-1 to the Generals.

In the summer of 1940, it became apparent that they would not have the numbers or the money to continue competing during World War II and folded.

== Season-by-season record ==
Note: GP = Games Played, W = Wins, L = Losses, T = Ties, OTL = Overtime Losses, GF = Goals for, GA = Goals against

Season	GP	W	L	T	OTL	GF	GA	Points	Finish	Playoffs
1925-26	Independent									Lost Regional Final
1926-27	Independent									Lost Regional Final
1927-28	12	10	2	0	-	61	26	20	1st TBJHL	Won League
1928-29	12	9	3	0	-	--	--	18	1st TBJHL	Won League
1929-30	15	11	3	1	-	--	--	23	2nd TBJHL	Lost semi-final
1930-31	12	7	5	0	-	31	37	14	3rd MJHL	
1931-32	10	4	4	2	-	17	23	10	2nd WinJHL	
1932-33	10	7	3	0	-	32	23	14	2nd MJHL-S	
1933-34	16	12	4	0	-	--	--	24	2nd MJHL	Won League
1934-35	17	13	3	1	-	78	45	27	2nd MJHL	
1935-36	16	6	9	1	-	40	57	13	8th MJHL	
1936-37	16	5	10	1	-	48	74	11	8th MJHL	
1937-38	22	1	19	2	-	39	104	4	9th MJHL	
1938-39	22	9	11	2	-	69	62	20	5th MJHL	
1939-40	24	15	5	4	-	98	66	34	2nd MJHL	Won League, won AbC

== Notable alumni ==
- John Gallagher
- Bill Juzda
- Doug Lewis
- Jake Milford
- Babe Pratt
- Chuck Rayner
- Stu Smith
- Bill Thomson
- Jimmy Ward
- Aubrey Webster

== See also ==
- List of ice hockey teams in Ontario
