= Dennis Olson =

Canadian ice hockey player

- Born: November 9, 1934 Kenora, Ontario, Canada
- Died: July 29, 2021 (aged 86) Kenora, Ontario, Canada
- Height: 6 ft 3 in (191 cm)
- Weight: 200 lb (91 kg; 14 st 4 lb)
- Position: Centre
- Shot: Right
- Played for: Detroit Red Wings
- Playing career: 1954–1965

Dennis Olson (November 9, 1934 – July 29, 2021) was a Canadian professional ice hockey centre who played three games in the National Hockey League with the Detroit Red Wings during the 1957–58 season. The rest of his career, which lasted from 1954 to 1965, was spent in the minor leagues. Olson was born in Kenora, Ontario, but grew up in Port Arthur, Ontario.

== Career statistics ==
=== Regular season and playoffs ===
			Regular season					Playoffs
Season	Team	League	GP	G	A	Pts	PIM	GP	G	A	Pts	PIM
1951–52	Port Arthur Flyers	TBJHL	30	16	15	31	18	3	0	1	1	0
1952–53	Port Arthur Flyers	TBJHL	30	24	23	47	39	8	3	4	7	2
1953–54	Port Arthur North Stars	TBJHL	36	31	22	53	43	5	4	2	6	12
1953–54	Fort William Canadians	M-Cup	—	—	—	—	—	13	2	6	8	11
1954–55	Troy Bruins	IHL	57	9	24	33	36	11	1	6	7	7
1955–56	Troy Bruins	IHL	60	31	39	70	76	5	0	2	2	9
1956–57	New Westminster Royals	WHL	70	25	14	39	23	13	5	2	7	6
1957–58	Seattle Americans	WHL	7	3	7	10	0	—	—	—	—	—
1957–58	Vancouver Canucks	WHL	31	19	12	31	12	—	—	—	—	—
1957–58	Edmonton Flyers	WHL	24	11	8	19	4	—	—	—	—	—
1957–58	Detroit Red Wings	NHL	3	0	0	0	0	—	—	—	—	—
1958–59	Springfield Indians	AHL	68	21	23	44	20	—	—	—	—	—
1959–60	Trois-Rivières Lions	EPHL	6	1	1	2	2	—	—	—	—	—
1959–60	Springfield Indians	AHL	61	14	29	43	13	10	1	5	6	4
1960–61	Kitchener Beavers	EPHL	54	31	31	62	57	—	—	—	—	—
1960–61	Springfield Indians	AHL	17	1	7	8	2	8	4	6	10	0
1961–62	Springfield Indians	AHL	70	24	22	46	30	11	4	3	7	4
1962–63	Springfield Indians	AHL	72	25	33	58	20	—	—	—	—	—
1963–64	Springfield Indians	AHL	72	20	33	53	16	—	—	—	—	—
1964–65	Springfield Indians	AHL	72	21	34	55	30	—	—	—	—	—
AHL totals			432	126	181	307	131	29	9	14	23	8
NHL totals			3	0	0	0	0	—	—	—	—	—
