= Ray Ceresino =

Canadian ice hockey player

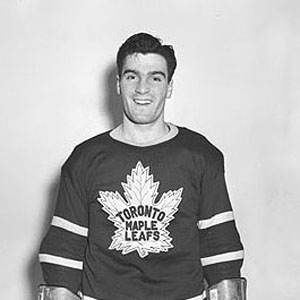
- Born: April 24, 1929 Port Arthur, Ontario, Canada
- Died: May 1, 2015 (aged 86) San Diego, California, United States
- Height: 5 ft 9 in (175 cm)
- Weight: 160 lb (73 kg; 11 st 6 lb)
- Position: Right wing
- Shot: Right
- Played for: Toronto Maple Leafs
- Playing career: 1946–1957

Ramo Peter "Ray" Ceresino (April 24, 1929 – May 1, 2015) was a Canadian ice hockey left winger. He played 12 games for the Toronto Maple Leafs of the National Hockey League during the 1948–49 season. The rest of his career, which lasted from 1946 to 1957, was spent in the minor leagues.

On June 2, 1953, he married Lorraine Giardetti; they were married for 62 years. He moved his family to California in 1962 and settled in Los Angeles where he worked as a mortgage broker. He later retired to San Diego. He had three children, including Gordon Ceresino.

== Career statistics ==
=== Regular season and playoffs ===
| | | | Regular season | | | | | Playoffs |
| Season | Team | League | GP | G | A | Pts | PIM | GP | G | A | Pts | PIM |
|---|---|---|---|---|---|---|---|---|---|---|---|---|
| 1944–45 | Port Arthur Bruins | TBJHL | 10 | 17 | 6 | 23 | 2 | 8 | 6 | 4 | 10 | 4 |
| 1944–45 | Port Arthur Bruins | M-Cup | — | — | — | — | — | 10 | 8 | 4 | 12 | 4 |
| 1945–46 | Port Arthur Bruins | TBJHL | 6 | 10 | 9 | 19 | 0 | 7 | 6 | 11 | 17 | 0 |
| 1945–46 | Port Arthur Flyers | TBSHL | — | — | — | — | — | 5 | 7 | 1 | 8 | 0 |
| 1946–47 | Oshawa Generals | OHA | 28 | 24 | 29 | 53 | 4 | 5 | 0 | 6 | 6 | 2 |
| 1947–48 | Oshawa Generals | OHA | 1 | 0 | 0 | 0 | 0 | 5 | 2 | 2 | 4 | 0 |
| 1948–49 | Toronto Maple Leafs | NHL | 12 | 1 | 1 | 2 | 2 | — | — | — | — | — |
| 1948–49 | Pittsburgh Hornets | AHL | 47 | 22 | 16 | 38 | 14 | — | — | — | — | — |
| 1949–50 | Cleveland Barons | AHL | 47 | 17 | 24 | 41 | 22 | 9 | 3 | 2 | 5 | 5 |
| 1950–51 | Cleveland Barons | AHL | 52 | 21 | 27 | 48 | 11 | 11 | 4 | 3 | 7 | 2 |
| 1951–52 | Cleveland Barons | AHL | 14 | 3 | 1 | 4 | 0 | — | — | — | — | — |
| 1951–52 | Seattle Ironmen | PCHL | 44 | 13 | 15 | 28 | 18 | 2 | 0 | 1 | 1 | 0 |
| 1952–53 | Cleveland Barons | AHL | 64 | 23 | 35 | 58 | 12 | 11 | 2 | 1 | 3 | 0 |
| 1953–54 | Cleveland Barons | AHL | 57 | 14 | 22 | 36 | 9 | 6 | 1 | 1 | 2 | 2 |
| 1954–55 | Providence Reds | AHL | 22 | 4 | 10 | 14 | 2 | — | — | — | — | — |
| 1954–55 | Montreal Royals | QSHL | 3 | 0 | 0 | 0 | 0 | — | — | — | — | — |
| 1955–56 | Victoria Cougars | WHL | 21 | 1 | 4 | 5 | 2 | — | — | — | — | — |
| 1956–57 | Sault Ste. Marie Indians | NOHA | 43 | 9 | 20 | 29 | 4 | — | — | — | — | — |
| AHL totals | | | 303 | 104 | 135 | 239 | 70 | 37 | 10 | 7 | 17 | 9 |
| NHL totals | | | 12 | 1 | 1 | 2 | 2 | — | — | — | — | — |
