= Thunder Bay Beavers =

- City: Thunder Bay, Ontario
- League: Thunder Bay Junior A Hockey League; Can-Am Junior Hockey League
- Operated: 1971-1978
- Home arena: Fort William Gardens

Franchise history
- 1971–1972: Thunder Bay Vulcans
- 1972–1973: Thunder Bay Centennials
- 1973–1978: Thunder Bay Beavers

Previous franchise history
- 1978: merged with Degagne Hurricanes and Fort William Canadians

The Thunder Bay Beavers were a Canadian Junior ice hockey club from Thunder Bay, Ontario. The Canadians were members of the Thunder Bay Junior A Hockey League and were 1972 National Centennial Cup quarter-finalists, losing to the eventual winner Guelph CMC's.

== History ==
In 1971, American investors were brought into the Thunder Bay Junior A Hockey League. The result was an expanded league and changing the league's name to the Thunder Bay-Minnesota League. The new teams were the Minnesota Jr. Stars and the St. Paul, MN-sponsored Thunder Bay Vulcans. The name "Vulcans" came from an organization in the St. Paul area, but the team played in Ontario.

In their first season, the Vulcans proved to be an instant powerhouse. With an undefeated 21-0-1 record in the TBMJHL regular season, the Vulcans also posted an overall record of 33-2-3 with combined regular season record and exhibition schedule versus the local NCAA loop (including the Lakehead Nor'Westers) and the semi-pro United States Hockey League. The Vulcans easily won the league title and moved on to the 1972 Centennial Cup National playdowns. In the first round they drew the Central Junior A Hockey League champion Smiths Falls Bears. The Vulcans masterfully defeated the Bears 4-games-to-1 and outscored them 36–19, including a 15-4 blowout win to clinch the series. In the National quarter-final, the Vulcans drew the Southern Ontario Junior A Hockey League's Guelph CMC's. Guelph edged out a pair of 5-4 victories to open the series. Game three was a 7–3 win for the Vulcans, and Game four was won 7–0. The CMC's rebounded in Game five with a 6–2 to take a 3–2 series lead. In Game six, the Vulcans defaulted the game only 1:42 into the first period. The coach of the Vulcans was unhappy about a series of calls the referee made and pulled the Vulcans off of the ice in front of 4,200 Guelph fans. The ref awarded the game to Guelph when it became clear that the Vulcans would not return. Guelph went on to easily win the Centennial Cup, leaving the boys on the Vulcans, who were far from down and out, wondering what could have been.

In 1972, the TBJHL was renamed the Can-Am Junior Hockey League. Only the Vulcans, Jr. Stars and the Westfort Hurricanes went on with the league. The remaining teams dropped to Thunder Bay Jr. B. The Vulcans were sold by their St. Paul investors during the season and changed their names to the Thunder Bay Centennials. The newly renamed St. Paul Jr. Stars, later to be called St. Paul Vulcans, went on to win the league and compete in the 1973 Centennial Cup playdowns. The Centennials made it clear at the end of the season that they would not play another year in the increasingly American league. The Thunder Bay Junior A League was resurrected in 1973 and the team took on the traditional name Thunder Bay Beavers after the Fort William Beavers of senior hockey fame. The St. Paul Vulcans went on to form a new league called the Midwest Junior Hockey League. The later merger between the MWJHL and the USHL would revolutionize American junior hockey.

In 1978 the Beavers and all other Thunder Bay-area teams were forced to downsize and most of them ceased to exist. The last known season of the Beavers ended in 1978.

== Season-by-Season Standings ==
Season	GP	W	L	T	GF	GA	P	Results
1971–72	22	21	0	1	--	--	42	1st TBMJHL
1972–73	34	13	15	6	151	142	32	2nd CAJHL
1973–74	31	1	28	2	105	250	4	3rd TBJHL
1974–75	27	8	16	3	132	177	19	3rd TBJHL
1975–76	30	9	16	5	133	153	23	3rd TBJHL
1976–77	21	10	9	2	134	117	22	3rd TBJHL
1977–78	28	11	16	1	--	--	23	4th TBJHL

=== Playoffs ===
- 1972 Won League, lost Dudley Hewitt Cup semi-final

Thunder Bay Vulcans defeated Minnesota Jr. Stars 4-games-to-none TBMJHL CHAMPIONS
Thunder Bay Vulcans defeated Smiths Falls Bears (CJHL) 4-games-to-1
Guelph CMC's (SOJHL) defeated Thunder Bay Vulcans 4-games-to-2

- 1973 Lost final/TBAHA Jack Adams Trophy final

Thunder Bay Centennials defeated Westfort Hurricanes 4-games-to-2
Thunder Bay Centennials defeated Fort William Canadians (TBJHL) 2-games-to-none
St. Paul Jr. Stars defeated Thunder Bay Centennials 4-games-to-none

- 1974 Lost TBJHL final/Lost TBAHA semi-final

Fort William Canadians defeated Thunder Bay Beavers 3-games-to-2

- 1975 Lost semi-final

Thunder Bay Hurricanes defeated Thunder Bay Beavers 4-games-to-2

- 1976 Lost final

Thunder Bay Beavers defeated Thunder Bay Hurricanes 4-games-to-2
Thunder Bay Eagles defeated Thunder Bay Beavers 4-games-to-none

- 1977 Lost semi-final

Degagne Hurricanes defeated Thunder Bay Beavers 3-games-to-none and 1 tie

- 1978 Lost semi-final

Degagne Hurricanes defeated Thunder Bay Beavers 3-games-to-none

== Championships ==
TBJHL Champions:

1972

== Notable alumni ==
- Danny Gruen
- Lee Fogolin
