= Ralph Stewart (ice hockey) =

Canadian ice hockey player

- Born: December 2, 1948 (age 76); Fort William, Ontario, Canada
- Height: 6 ft 1 in (185 cm)
- Weight: 190 lb (86 kg; 13 st 8 lb)
- Position: Centre
- Shot: Left
- Played for: Vancouver Canucks; New York Islanders
- Playing career: 1965–1979

Ralph Donald Stewart (born December 2, 1948) is a Canadian former professional ice hockey centre who played 251 games in the National Hockey League with the Vancouver Canucks and New York Islanders between 1970 and 1978. Stewart also spent several years playing in the minor league Central Hockey League.

== Career statistics ==
=== Regular season and playoffs ===
			Regular season					Playoffs
Season	Team	League	GP	G	A	Pts	PIM	GP	G	A	Pts	PIM
1962–63	Fort William Canadiens	TBJHL	—	—	—	—	—	5	1	1	2	0
1963–64	Fort William Canadiens	TBJHL	20	4	5	9	6	12	8	5	13	8
1964–65	Fort William Canadiens	TBJHL	24	13	18	31	38	—	—	—	—	—
1965–66	Montreal Junior Canadiens	OHA	46	7	9	16	28	10	0	0	0	2
1966–67	Montreal Junior Canadiens	OHA	48	6	23	29	49	6	4	1	5	0
1967–68	Montreal Junior Canadiens	OHA	43	17	31	48	28	11	5	4	9	8
1968–69	Vancouver Canucks	WHL	6	0	1	1	0	—	—	—	—	—
1968–69	Houston Apollos	CHL	44	10	17	27	10	3	0	0	0	0
1969–70	Kansas City Blues	CHL	72	21	21	42	37	—	—	—	—	—
1970–71	Vancouver Canucks	NHL	3	0	1	1	0	—	—	—	—	—
1970–71	Rochester Americans	AHL	66	27	16	43	14	—	—	—	—	—
1971–72	Seattle Totems	WHL	16	2	6	8	4	—	—	—	—	—
1971–72	Tidewater Wings	AHL	20	3	8	11	8	—	—	—	—	—
1971–72	Fort Worth Wings	CHL	38	21	36	57	23	7	6	6	12	6
1972–73	Fort Worth Wings	CHL	39	29	36	65	23	—	—	—	—	—
1972–73	New York Islanders	NHL	31	4	10	14	4	—	—	—	—	—
1973–74	New York Islanders	NHL	67	23	20	43	6	—	—	—	—	—
1974–75	New York Islanders	NHL	70	16	24	40	12	13	3	3	6	2
1975–76	New York Islanders	NHL	31	6	7	13	2	6	1	1	2	0
1975–76	Fort Worth Texans	CHL	3	2	5	7	2	—	—	—	—	—
1976–77	Vancouver Canucks	NHL	34	6	8	14	4	—	—	—	—	—
1976–77	Tulsa Oilers	CHL	43	24	26	50	14	—	—	—	—	—
1977–78	Vancouver Canucks	NHL	16	2	3	5	0	—	—	—	—	—
1977–78	Tulsa Oilers	CHL	50	16	29	45	12	7	6	3	9	0
1978–79	Fort Worth Texans	CHL	76	15	33	48	8	5	0	0	0	4
CHL totals			365	138	203	341	129	22	12	9	21	10
NHL totals			252	57	73	130	28	19	4	4	8	2
