= Stu McNeill =

Canadian ice hockey player

- Born: September 25, 1938 (age 87) Port Arthur, Ontario, Canada
- Height: 5 ft 10 in (178 cm)
- Weight: 170 lb (77 kg; 12 st 2 lb)
- Position: Centre
- Shot: Right
- Played for: Detroit Red Wings
- Playing career: 1957–1960

Stu McNeill (born September 25, 1938) is a Canadian former professional ice hockey player who played eleven games in the National Hockey League with the Detroit Red Wings between 1958 and 1959. Stuart McNeill was born in Emo, Rainy River District, Ontario, the son of teacher Clifford Stuart McNeill and Edith Florence Nordin. He graduated from Port Arthur Collegiate Institute and McMaster University and practiced as an orthpedic surgeon at Stratford, Ontario for many years.

== Career statistics ==
=== Regular season and playoffs ===
			Regular season					Playoffs
Season	Team	League	GP	G	A	Pts	PIM	GP	G	A	Pts	PIM
1954–55	Port Arthur North Stars	TBJHL	32	11	3	14	10	—	—	—	—	—
1955–56	Port Arthur North Stars	TBJHL	30	16	23	39	2	9	3	4	7	2
1955–56	Port Arthur North Stars	M-Cup	—	—	—	—	—	13	8	7	15	6
1955–56	Regina Pats	M-Cup	—	—	—	—	—	3	0	0	0	0
1956–57	Port Arthur North Stars	TBJHL	30	27	28	55	0	8	3	4	7	0
1956–57	Fort William Canadians	M-Cup	—	—	—	—	—	11	4	7	11	2
1957–58	Hamilton Tiger Cubs	OHA	52	11	27	38	29	15	4	8	12	10
1957–58	Detroit Red Wings	NHL	3	0	0	0	0	—	—	—	—	—
1958–59	Hamilton Tiger Cubs	OHA	53	22	27	49	17	—	—	—	—	—
1958–59	Detroit Red Wings	NHL	3	1	1	2	2	—	—	—	—	—
1959–60	Detroit Red Wings	NHL	5	0	0	0	0	—	—	—	—	—
1959–60	Edmonton Flyers	WHL	59	10	17	27	4	4	0	1	1	0
NHL totals			11	1	1	2	2	—	—	—	—	—
