= Lou Marcon =

Canadian ice hockey player (1935–2023)

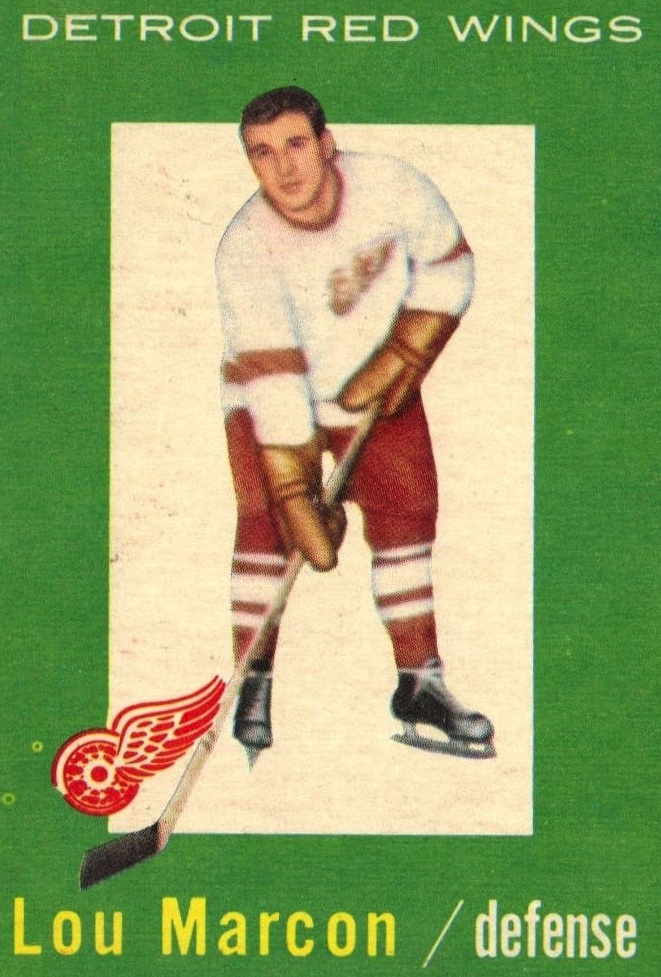
- Born: May 28, 1935 Fort William, Ontario Canada
- Died: May 30, 2023 (aged 88) Thunder Bay, Ontario, Canada
- Height: 5 ft 9 in (175 cm)
- Weight: 175 lb (79 kg; 12 st 7 lb)
- Position: Defence
- Shot: Right
- Played for: Detroit Red Wings
- Playing career: 1955–1973

Luigi Angelo Marcon (May 28, 1935 – May 30, 2023) was a Canadian professional ice hockey player who played 60 games in the National Hockey League for the Detroit Red Wings between 1959 and 1963. The rest of his career, which lasted from 1955 to 1973, was spent in various minor leagues.

== Career statistics ==
=== Regular season and playoffs ===
			Regular season					Playoffs
Season	Team	League	GP	G	A	Pts	PIM	GP	G	A	Pts	PIM
1951–52	Fort William Canadians	TBJHL	28	1	0	1	10	—	—	—	—	—
1952–53	Fort William Canadians	TBJHL	30	1	2	3	20	6	0	2	2	4
1952–53	Fort William Beavers	A-Cup	—	—	—	—	—	5	1	1	2	4
1953–54	Fort William Canadians	TBJHL	36	1	5	6	48	4	0	0	0	2
1953–54	Fort William Canadians	M-Cup	—	—	—	—	—	13	1	3	4	6
1954–55	Fort William Canadians	TBJHL	—	—	—	—	—	—	—	—	—	—
1954–55	Fort William Canadians	M-Cup	—	—	—	—	—	7	2	1	3	9
1955–56	Cincinnati Mohawks	IHL	59	2	22	24	113	8	1	1	2	8
1956–57	Rochester Americans	AHL	2	0	0	0	0	—	—	—	—	—
1956–57	Cincinnati Mohawks	IHL	55	0	17	17	49	7	0	1	1	4
1957–58	Montreal Royals	QSHL	3	0	0	0	2	—	—	—	—	—
1957–58	Cincinnati Mohawks	IHL	64	7	31	38	89	4	0	1	1	2
1958–59	Edmonton Flyers	WHL	47	1	6	7	66	—	—	—	—	—
1958–59	Detroit Red Wings	NHL	21	0	1	1	12	—	—	—	—	—
1959–60	Edmonton Flyers	WHL	15	0	9	9	28	4	0	0	0	22
1959–60	Detroit Red Wings	NHL	38	0	3	3	30	—	—	—	—	—
1960–61	Edmonton Flyers	WHL	55	7	11	18	91	—	—	—	—	—
1961–62	Edmonton Flyers	WHL	62	2	15	17	68	12	1	2	3	23
1962–63	Edmonton Flyers	WHL	28	5	8	13	61	—	—	—	—	—
1962–63	Pittsburgh Hornets	AHL	35	0	3	3	105	—	—	—	—	—
1962–63	Detroit Red Wings	NHL	1	0	0	0	0	—	—	—	—	—
1963–64	Pittsburgh Hornets	AHL	49	3	15	18	108	5	0	0	0	15
1964–65	Pittsburgh Hornets	AHL	62	2	11	13	190	4	0	1	1	6
1965–66	Memphis Wings	CHL	59	1	9	10	107	—	—	—	—	—
1965–66	Pittsburgh Hornets	AHL	11	0	2	2	25	3	0	0	0	12
1966–67	Memphis Wings	CHL	67	4	10	14	206	7	1	2	3	25
1967–68	Fort Worth Wings	CHL	66	0	7	7	157	13	0	0	0	32
1968–69	Thunder Bay Twins	TBSHL	10	0	6	6	6	8	1	1	2	8
1969–70	Thunder Bay Twins	TBSHL	—	—	—	—	—	—	—	—	—	—
1970–71	Thunder Bay Twins	USHL	—	—	—	—	—	—	—	—	—	—
1971–72	Thunder Bay Twins	USHL	27	2	12	14	83	—	—	—	—	—
1972–73	Thunder Bay Twins	USHL	22	1	5	6	20	—	—	—	—	—
WHL totals			207	15	49	64	314	16	1	2	3	45
NHL totals			60	0	4	4	42	—	—	—	—	—
