= Steve Black (ice hockey) =

Canadian ice hockey player

- Born: March 31, 1927 Fort William, Ontario, Canada
- Died: June 12, 2008 (aged 81) Thunder Bay, Ontario, Canada
- Height: 6 ft 0 in (183 cm)
- Weight: 185 lb (84 kg; 13 st 3 lb)
- Position: Left wing
- Shot: Left
- Played for: Detroit Red Wings; Chicago Black Hawks
- Playing career: 1946–1954

Stephen Black (March 31, 1927 – June 12, 2008) was a Canadian professional ice hockey player who played in the National Hockey League with the Detroit Red Wings and Chicago Black Hawks between 1949 and 1951. The rest of his career, which lasted from 1946 to 1954, was spent in the minor leagues. Black won the Stanley Cup with Detroit in 1950.

== Junior career ==
Steve Black played five years for the Port Arthur Flyers of the TBJHL, making two trips to the Memorial Cup Tournament before joining the Pacific Coast Hockey League (PCHL).

== Professional career ==
In 1946, Black joined the Oakland Oaks of the PCHL and showed enough talent to move up to the American Hockey League the following season. After two years in the minors, he joined the Detroit Red Wings of the National Hockey League (NHL). The 1949–50 Wings were already deep in offensive talent, with established players such as Gordie Howe, Ted Lindsay and Sid Abel, so Black was told to concentrate on the defensive aspect of the game. As Black's defensive skills increased, his overall game improved, and was he selected to play in the 1950 NHL All Star Game. He won the Stanley Cup with the Red Wings. Black started the 1951 season with Detroit before being traded to the Chicago Black Hawks. He would play 39 games for Chicago that season, which would also be his last in the NHL. Black played in the minor leagues for three more seasons before retiring from hockey in 1954.

== Career statistics ==
=== Regular season and playoffs ===
			Regular season					Playoffs
Season	Team	League	GP	G	A	Pts	PIM	GP	G	A	Pts	PIM
1943–44	Port Arthur Flyers	TBJHL	10	4	2	6	8	6	3	6	9	0
1943–44	Port Arthur Flyers	M-Cup	—	—	—	—	—	9	2	6	8	6
1944–45	Port Arthur Flyers	TBJHL	11	17	8	25	4	3	2	0	2	0
1944–45	Port Arthur Flyers	M-Cup	—	—	—	—	—	10	2	4	6	6
1945–46	Port Arthur Flyers	TBJHL	6	11	10	21	0	5	7	5	12	4
1946–47	Oakland Oaks	PCHL	60	43	36	79	79	—	—	—	—	—
1947–48	St. Louis Flyers	AHL	58	11	18	29	29	—	—	—	—	—
1948–49	St. Louis Flyers	AHL	62	24	47	71	59	7	0	5	5	12
1949–50	Detroit Red Wings	NHL	69	7	14	21	53	13	0	0	0	13
1950–51	Milwaukee Sea Gulls	USHL	9	4	6	10	11	—	—	—	—	—
1950–51	Indianapolis Capitals	AHL	8	1	2	3	13	—	—	—	—	—
1950–51	Detroit Red Wings	NHL	5	0	0	0	2	—	—	—	—	—
1950–51	Chicago Black Hawks	NHL	39	4	6	10	22	—	—	—	—	—
1951–52	St. Louis Flyers	AHL	37	9	21	30	34	—	—	—	—	—
1952–53	Calgary Stampeders	WHL	45	21	16	37	61	5	4	3	7	2
1953–54	Calgary Stampeders	WHL	43	21	33	54	29	18	2	4	6	6
AHL totals			165	45	88	133	135	7	0	5	5	12
NHL totals			113	11	20	31	77	13	0	0	0	13
WHL totals			88	42	49	91	90	23	6	7	13	8

== Awards and achievements ==
- 1950 Stanley Cup Championship (Detroit Red Wings)
- 1950 NHL All Star (Detroit Red Wings)
