= Murray Wing =

Canadian ice hockey player

- Born: October 14, 1950 (age 74); Thunder Bay, Ontario, Canada
- Height: 5 ft 11 in (180 cm)
- Weight: 180 lb (82 kg; 12 st 12 lb)
- Position: Defence
- Shot: Right
- Played for: Detroit Red Wings
- NHL draft: 83rd overall, 1970; Boston Bruins
- Playing career: 1971–1977

Murray Alan Wing (born October 14, 1950) is a Canadian retired professional ice hockey defenceman who played in one game in the National Hockey League with the Detroit Red Wings during the 1973–74 season, on April 7, 1974 against the Chicago Black Hawks. The rest of his career, which lasted from 1971 to 1977, was spent in the minor leagues.

== Career statistics ==
=== Regular season and playoffs ===
			Regular season					Playoffs
Season	Team	League	GP	G	A	Pts	PIM	GP	G	A	Pts	PIM
1967–68	Westfort Hurricanes	TBJHL	18	4	6	10	25	—	—	—	—	—
1967–68	Westfort Hurricanes	M-Cup	—	—	—	—	—	11	2	2	4	11
1968–69	Westfort Hurricanes	TBJHL	36	22	25	47	58	—	—	—	—	—
1968–69	Westfort Hurricanes	M-Cup	—	—	—	—	—	6	1	3	4	9
1970–71	University of North Dakota	WCHA	29	3	10	13	18	—	—	—	—	—
1971–72	Oklahoma City Blazers	CHL	71	12	15	27	79	6	0	0	0	14
1972–73	Boston Braves	AHL	57	2	10	12	37	10	2	6	8	2
1972–73	San Diego Gulls	WHL	6	0	0	0	2	—	—	—	—	—
1973–74	Detroit Red Wings	NHL	1	0	1	1	0	—	—	—	—	—
1973–74	London Lions	Exhib	71	21	21	42	24	—	—	—	—	—
1974–75	Thunder Bay Twins	USHL	44	16	35	51	23	—	—	—	—	—
1975–76	Thunder Bay Twins	OHA Sr	22	3	15	18	8	—	—	—	—	—
1976–77	Thunder Bay Twins	OHA Sr	12	2	11	13	2	—	—	—	—	—
NHL totals			1	0	1	1	0	—	—	—	—	—

== See also ==
- List of players who played only one game in the NHL
