= Port Arthur Marrs =

- City: Port Arthur, Ontario
- League: Thunder Bay Junior A Hockey League; Thunder Bay Junior B Hockey League
- Operated: 1925 – July 6, 1980
- Home arena: Port Arthur Arena
- Colours: Unknown
- Head coach: Unknown

Franchise history
- c. 1925–1943: Port Arthur Juniors
- 1943–1946: Port Arthur Flyers
- 1946–1949: Port Arthur Juniors
- 1950–1953: Port Arthur Flyers
- 1953–1966: Port Arthur North Stars
- 1966–1970: Port Arthur Marrs
- 1970–1971: Thunder Bay Marrs
- 1971–1978: Thunder Bay Case Eagles
- 1978–1980: Thunder Bay North Stars

Previous franchise history
- 1978: Merged with Thunder Bay Blades

The Port Arthur Marrs were a junior ice hockey team that played in Port Arthur, Ontario (now part of the city of Thunder Bay). They were named for trucking company and sponsor W.H. Marr, Ltd., and contested the 1967 Memorial Cup, which they lost to the Toronto Marlboros.

== History ==
The Marrs played out of the Thunder Bay Junior Hockey League of Hockey Northwestern Ontario. They became the Thunder Bay Marrs in 1970 and then the Thunder Bay Case Eagles in 1971.

The North Stars folded on July 6, 1980, when the TBAHA left them with no league to play in.

== Season-by-season standings ==
Season	GP	W	L	T	OTL	GF	GA	P	Results
1925–26	16	5	11	0	-	53	89	10	3rd TBJHL
1926–27	18	2	16	0	-	--	--	4	4th TBJHL
1927–28	15	5	10	0	-	40	66	10	4th TBJHL
1928–29	15	3	12	0	-	--	--	9	5th TBJHL
1929–30	18	11	7	0	-	--	--	12	3rd TBJHL
1930–31	14	5	9	0	-	--	--	10	4th TBJHL
1931–32	12	7	5	0	-	--	--	14	3rd TBJHL
1932–33	12	9	3	0	-	--	--	18	1st TBJHL
1933–34	14	7	7	0	-	--	--	14	4th TBJHL
1934–35	15	14	1	0	-	63	35	28	1st TBJHL
1935–36	16	8	7	1	-	52	37	17	3rd TBJHL
1936–37	18	13	5	0	-	--	--	26	1st TBJHL
1937–38	18	14	3	1	-	--	--	29	1st TBJHL
1938–39	18	10	5	3	-	76	54	23	1st TBJHL
1939–40	16	8	7	1	-	69	66	17	1st TBJHL
1940–41	18	15	2	1	-	146	79	31	1st TBJHL
1941–42	Did not participate								
1942–43	10	5	4	1	-	57	47	11	2nd TBJHL
1943–44	10	4	6	0	-	--	--	8	3rd TBJHL
1944–45	11	9	1	1	-	--	--	19	1st TBJHL
1945–46	7	7	0	0	-	59	19	14	1st TBJHL
1946–47	6	0	6	0	-	16	46	0	4th TBJHL
1947–48	9	1	8	0	-	23	92	2	4th TBJHL
1948–49	12	3	8	1	-	59	95	7	4th TBJHL
1949–50	18	5	13	0	-	85	120	10	4th TBJHL
1950–51	21	2	19	0	-	56	146	4	4th TBJHL
1951–52	30	14	12	4	-	152	144	32	2nd TBJHL
1952–53	29	16	13	0	-	157	136	32	2nd TBJHL
1953–54	35	11	24	0	-	132	190	22	3rd TBJHL
1954–55	29	9	19	1	-	93	148	19	3rd TBJHL
1955–56	30	19	9	2	-	139	89	40	2nd TBJHL
1956–57	30	18	11	1	-	167	118	37	2nd TBJHL
1957–58	21	6	14	1	-	61	106	13	2nd TBJHL
1958–59	23	10	12	1	-	97	105	21	2nd TBJHL
1959–60	20	6	14	0	-	70	87	12	3rd TBJHL
1960–61	24	9	13	2	-	80	92	20	2nd TBJHL
1961–62	28	18	7	3	-	152	103	39	2nd TBJHL
1962–63	28	14	10	4	-	113	95	32	2nd TBJHL
1963–64	26	10	8	8	-	97	101	28	1st TBJHL
1964–65	24	13	10	1	-	132	100	27	2nd TBJHL
1965–66	30	20	8	2	-	199	114	42	2nd TBJHL
1966–67	28	21	5	2	-	176	99	44	1st TBJHL
1967–68	32	15	13	4	-	162	145	37.5	2nd TBJHL
1968–69	36	17	13	6	-	181	166	40	2nd TBJHL
1969–70	30	10	16	4	-	132	162	24	3rd TBJHL
1970–71	30	14	11	5	-	136	110	33	1st TBJHL
1971–72	27	2	20	5	-	--	--	9	5th TBMJHL
1972–73	22	12	8	2	-	--	--	26	2nd TBJBHL
1973–74	31	19	9	3	-	205	145	41	2nd TBJHL
1974–75	27	12	9	6	-	140	128	30	2nd TBJHL
1975–76	30	20	5	5	-	167	99	45	1st TBJHL
1976–77	25	20	4	1	-	197	89	41	1st TBJHL
1977–78	26	8	14	4	-	--	--	20	5th TBJHL
1978–79	25	14	9	2	-	--	--	30	2nd TBJHL
1979–80	34	20	14	0	-	217	161	40	2nd TBJHL

=== Playoffs ===
- 1971 Won League, Won TBAHA Jack Adams Trophy, Lost Hewitt-Dudley Memorial Trophy semi-final

Thunder Bay Marrs defeated Westfort Hurricanes 4 games to 1 TBJHL CHAMPIONS
Thunder Bay Marrs defeated Fort Frances Royals (Independent) 3 games to none JACK ADAMS TROPHY CHAMPIONS
Thunder Bay Marrs defeated Sudbury Wolves (NOJHA) 4 games to 3
Charlottetown Islanders (MJAHL) defeated Thunder Bay Marrs 4 games to 1

- 1972 DNQ
- 1973 Lost Final

Fort William Canadians defeated Thunder Bay Eagles 3 games to none

- 1974 Lost TBAHA semi-final

Thunder Bay Hurricanes (MWJHL) defeated Thunder Bay Eagles 3 games to none

- 1975 Won League, Lost Hewitt-Dudley Memorial Trophy semi-final

Thunder Bay Eagles defeated Fort William Canadians 4 games to 2
Thunder Bay Eagles defeated Thunder Bay Hurricanes 4 games to 1 TBJHL CHAMPIONS
Guelph CMC's (SOJHL) defeated Thunder Bay Eagles 4 games to 1

- 1976 Won League, Lost Hewitt-Dudley Memorial Trophy quarter-final

Thunder Bay Eagles defeated Fort William Canadians 4 games to none
Thunder Bay Eagles defeated Thunder Bay Beavers 4 games to none TBJHL CHAMPIONS
Guelph Platers (SOJHL) defeated Thunder Bay Eagles 4 games to 1

- 1977 Won League, Won TBAHA Jack Adams Trophy, Lost Hewitt-Dudley Memorial Trophy semi-final

Thunder Bay Eagles defeated Fort William Canadians 3 games to none
Thunder Bay Eagles defeated Degagne Hurricanes 4 games to 1 TBJHL CHAMPIONS
Thunder Bay Eagles defeated Thunder Bay Blades 4 games to none JACK ADAMS TROPHY CHAMPIONS
North York Rangers (OPJHL) defeated Thunder Bay Eagles 4 games to 1

- 1978 DNQ
- 1979 Won League, Lost Dudley Hewitt Cup Semi-final

Thunder Bay North Stars defeated Rural Voyageurs 3 games to none
Thunder Bay North Stars defeated Degagne Buccaneers 4 games to 1 TBJHL CHAMPIONS
Guelph Platers (OPJHL) defeated Thunder Bay North Stars 4 games to none

- 1980 Won League, Lost Dudley Hewitt Cup Semi-final

Thunder Bay North Stars defeated Degagne Buccaneers 4 games to none with 1 tie TBJHL CHAMPIONS
North York Rangers (OPJHL) defeated Thunder Bay North Stars 4 games to none

== Championships ==
TBJHL Champions:

1932, 1933, 1935, 1937, 1940, 1941, 1944, 1946, 1956, 1962, 1965, 1967, 1971, 1975, 1976, 1977, 1979, 1980

Abbott Cup Champions:

1967

Abbott Cup Finalists:

1944, 1956

Memorial Cup Finalists:

1967

== Notable alumni ==
Juniors

- Lee Fogolin, Sr.
- Fred Page

Flyers

- Steve Black
- Ray Ceresino
- Steve Hrymnak
- Pentti Lund
- Calum MacKay
- Rudy Migay
- Dennis Olson
- Benny Woit

North Stars

- John Adams
- Bruce Gamble
- Stu McNeill
- Dennis Olson
- Ralph Stewart
- Gary Veneruzzo

PA Marrs

- John Adams
- Bill Fairbairn
- Gerry Hart
- Bob Kelly
- Vic Venasky
- Juha Widing

TB Marrs

- Lee Fogolin Jr.
- Nelson Pyatt
