= Eddie Kachur =

Canadian ice hockey player

- Born: April 22, 1934; Fort William, Ontario, Canada
- Died: December 16, 2014 (aged 80); Thunder Bay, Ontario, Canada
- Height: 5 ft 8 in (173 cm)
- Weight: 170 lb (77 kg; 12 st 2 lb)
- Position: Right wing
- Shot: Right
- Played for: Chicago Black Hawks
- Playing career: 1953–1972

Edward Charles "Ed" Kachur (April 22, 1934 – December 16, 2014) was a Canadian ice hockey forward who played 96 games in the National Hockey League for the Chicago Black Hawks during the 1956–57 and 1957–58 seasons. The rest of his career, which lasted from 1953 to 1972, was spent in the minor leagues.

== Career statistics ==
=== Regular season and playoffs ===
			Regular season					Playoffs
Season	Team	League	GP	G	A	Pts	PIM	GP	G	A	Pts	PIM
1949–50	Fort William Canadiens	TBJHL	16	5	5	10	54	10	1	1	2	10
1950–51	Fort William Canadiens	TBJHL	14	5	3	8	32	6	3	3	6	12
1951–52	Fort William Canadiens	TBJHL	29	38	22	60	96	—	—	—	—	—
1951–52	Fort William Canadiens	M-Cup	—	—	—	—	—	12	4	0	4	20
1952–53	Fort William Canadiens	TBJHL	19	21	14	35	34	5	2	3	5	0
1952–53	Fort William Canadiens	M-Cup	—	—	—	—	—	5	2	4	6	5
1953–54	Cincinnati Mohawks	IHL	63	32	26	58	61	11	2	2	4	2
1954–55	Shawinigan Falls Cataractes	QSHL	59	25	14	39	46	13	5	3	8	18
1955–56	Shawinigan Falls Cataractes	QSHL	64	31	34	65	91	11	6	5	11	16
1956–57	Chicago Black Hawks	NHL	34	5	7	12	21	—	—	—	—	—
1956–57	Shawinigan Falls Cataractes	QSHL	32	12	12	24	12	—	—	—	—	—
1957–58	Chicago Black Hawks	NHL	62	5	7	12	14	—	—	—	—	—
1958–59	Buffalo Bisons	AHL	68	15	17	32	26	11	5	2	7	6
1959–60	Buffalo Bisons	AHL	57	19	10	29	10	—	—	—	—	—
1960–61	Sault Thunderbirds	EPHL	70	38	43	81	71	12	3	6	9	16
1961–62	Sault Thunderbirds	EPHL	70	22	32	54	65	—	—	—	—	—
1962–63	Buffalo Bisons	AHL	68	19	19	38	35	13	2	3	5	8
1963–64	Buffalo Bisons	AHL	64	13	14	27	10	—	—	—	—	—
1964–65	Providence Reds	AHL	41	16	7	23	16	—	—	—	—	—
1964–65	Los Angeles Blades	WHL	22	1	6	7	4	—	—	—	—	—
1965–66	Providence Reds	AHL	57	28	19	47	30	—	—	—	—	—
1966–67	Providence Reds	AHL	55	22	20	42	20	—	—	—	—	—
1967–68	Providence Reds	AHL	72	47	29	76	30	8	3	2	5	8
1968–69	Providence Reds	AHL	71	26	26	52	24	9	1	4	5	6
1969–70	Providence Reds	AHL	21	9	4	13	2	—	—	—	—	—
1971–72	Johnstown Jets	EHL	25	18	11	29	6	—	—	—	—	—
AHL totals			574	214	165	379	203	41	11	11	22	28
NHL totals			96	10	14	24	35	—	—	—	—	—
