= Benny Woit =

Canadian ice hockey player

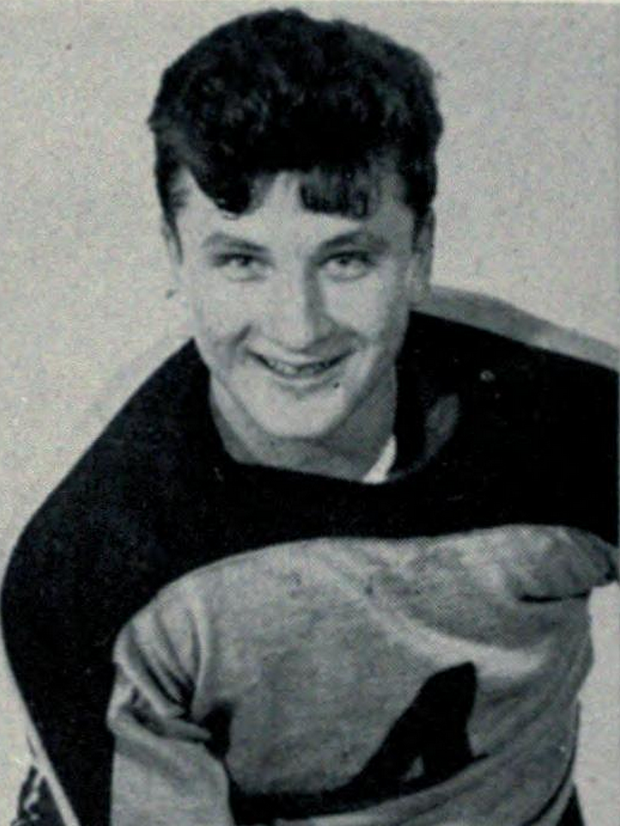
- Woit with St. Michaels, c. 1947
- Born: January 7, 1928 Fort William, Ontario, Canada
- Died: December 7, 2016 (aged 88) Richmond Hill, Ontario, Canada
- Height: 5 ft 11 in (180 cm)
- Weight: 190 lb (86 kg; 13 st 8 lb)
- Position: Defence
- Shot: Right
- Played for: Detroit Red Wings; Chicago Black Hawks
- Playing career: 1951–1957

Benedict Francis Woit (January 7, 1928 – December 7, 2016) was a Canadian ice hockey player. He played in the National Hockey League with the Detroit Red Wings and Chicago Black Hawks between 1951 and 1956. With Detroit he won the Stanley Cup three times, in 1952, 1954, and 1955

== Playing career ==
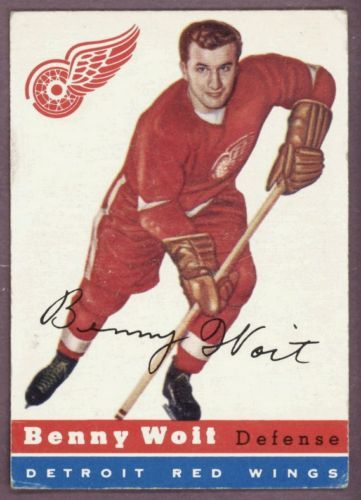
Trading card of Woit with the Red Wings, c. 1954

Woit made his presence known as a junior while playing for the Port Arthur Flyers and Bruins of the Thunder Bay Junior Hockey League and the St. Michael's Majors of the Ontario Hockey Association. He began playing for the Indianapolis Capitals of the American Hockey League for the 1948–49 season. The Detroit Red Wings promoted him in 1951, and his defensive play would help them secure the Stanley Cup in 1952, 1954, and 1955. Woit was traded to Chicago Black Hawks following the 1954–55 season but never produced as he did with the Red Wings. He went on to play in the AHL and later the Eastern Hockey League, for the Clinton Comets as both a player and a successful head coach. In 334 NHL games Benny Woit recorded 7 goals and 26 assists for 33 points.

Woit died on December 7, 2016.

== Career statistics ==
=== Regular season and playoffs ===
			Regular season					Playoffs
Season	Team	League	GP	G	A	Pts	PIM	GP	G	A	Pts	PIM
1944–45	Port Arthur Flyers	TBJHL	11	3	6	9	6	3	0	0	0	4
1945–46	Port Arthur Flyers	TBJHL	4	1	1	2	8	10	0	6	6	10
1946–47	St. Michael's College Majors	OHA	27	5	17	22	36	—	—	—	—	—
1948–49	Indianapolis Capitals	AHL	68	3	12	15	30	2	0	1	1	0
1949–50	Indianapolis Capitals	AHL	70	7	17	24	29	8	2	0	2	4
1950–51	Indianapolis Capitals	AHL	69	8	22	30	40	3	0	0	0	0
1950–51	Detroit Red Wings	NHL	2	0	0	0	2	4	0	0	0	2
1951–52	Detroit Red Wings	NHL	58	3	8	11	20	8	1	1	2	2
1952–53	Detroit Red Wings	NHL	70	1	5	6	40	6	1	3	4	0
1953–54	Detroit Red Wings	NHL	70	0	2	2	38	12	0	1	1	8
1954–55	Detroit Red Wings	NHL	61	2	3	5	22	11	0	1	1	6
1955–56	Chicago Black Hawks	NHL	63	1	8	9	46	—	—	—	—	—
1956–57	Rochester Americans	AHL	4	12	16	54	8	1	1	2	6
1956–57	Chicago Black Hawks	NHL	9	0	0	0	2	—	—	—	—	—
1957–58	Rochester Americans	AHL	52	2	7	9	40	—	—	—	—	—
1958–59	Spokane Spokes	WHL	61	5	9	14	54	4	0	3	3	4
1959–60	Providence Reds	AHL	30	1	2	3	16	5	1	1	2	0
1960–61	Providence Reds	AHL	58	2	10	12	26	—	—	—	—	—
1961–62	Clinton Comets	EHL	51	8	23	31	51	—	—	—	—	—
1961–62	Kingston Frontenacs	EPHL	5	0	1	1	6	1	0	0	0	0
1962–63	Clinton Comets	EHL	63	8	15	23	57	—	—	—	—	—
1963–64	Clinton Comets	EHL	69	12	35	47	78	—	—	—	—	—
1964–65	Clinton Comets	EHL	71	4	36	40	68	11	0	4	4	4
1965–66	Jersey Devils	EHL	38	3	19	22	60	—	—	—	—	—
NHL totals			333	7	26	33	170	41	2	6	8	18

== Awards and achievements ==
- NHL All-Star Game (1954)
- EHL First All-Star Team (1962, 1963)
- EHL Second All-Star Team (1964)
- EHL North First All-Star Team (1965)
