= Thunder Bay Hornets =

- City: Thunder Bay, Ontario
- League: Thunder Bay Junior Hockey League/ Manitoba Junior Hockey League
- Operated: 1982-1986
- Home arena: Fort William Gardens
- Colors: Red, Yellow, White

The Thunder Bay Hornets were a Junior "A" ice hockey team from Thunder Bay, Ontario, Canada. At their height, they won two consecutive bronze medals at the Western Canadian Junior B Championships - the Keystone Cup and later were in competition for the National Junior A Championship, the Centennial Cup, as members of the Manitoba Junior Hockey League.

== History ==
The Hornets were formed in 1982 to provide a Junior B team to the Thunder Bay-region. In their first year, they joined the Junior B Schreiber North Stars and the Junior A Thunder Bay Kings to form the Hockey Thunder Bay League—the region's only Junior league.

In both seasons in the TBJHL, the Hornets would win the City Junior B Crown but fall to the Thunder Bay Kings in the City Junior Finals. In 1983, the Hornets travelled to Portage la Prairie, Manitoba to compete for the Keystone Cup. Up against the Portage Terriers and Selkirk Fishermen of the Manitoba Junior B Hockey League as well as the Saskatoon Wesleys from the North Saskatchewan Junior B Hockey League. The Hornets would finish with a bronze medal. In 1984, the Keystone Cup was hosted by the Schreiber North Stars in Schreiber, Ontario. Portage and Selkirk would be the two other teams. Both Ontario teams were badly outplayed by the Manitoba teams, but they would meet in the bronze medal game won by the Hornets 8–4.

In 1984, the Kings were granted expansion into the American Junior A United States Hockey League and renamed themselves the Thunder Bay Flyers. With no real competition in the area, the Hornets took a chance and applied for entry into the Manitoba Junior Hockey League, a Junior A league in the neighbouring province to the West. The Hornets were accepted and were granted the right to be the Thunder Bay Amateur Hockey Association's Junior A representation instead of the Flyers. After a .500 record in their first season, finishing 3rd in the South Division, the Hornets were put out early in the MJHL playoffs. In 1985–86, the Hornets fell seven games below .500 for 4th in the South and the same playoff result. In the Flyers first two years in the USHL, they were equally dismal.

After 1986, the Hornets took leave of the MJHL and eventually disbanded. This allowed for the Thunder Bay Flyers to stack their rosters with local talent instead of share. From 1987 onward, the TBAHA would allow the Flyers to represent the region in the Centennial Cup playdowns in place of the Hornets (after they officially disbanded). The Flyers would go on to win two Clark Cups as American Champions and two Centennial Cups as Canadian Junior A Champions.

== Season-by-season records ==
Season	GP	W	L	T	OTL	GF	GA	P	Results	Playoffs
1982-83	24	5	18	1	-	77	149	11	3rd TBJHL	Lost final, Bronze at KC
1983-84	19	11	8	0	-	117	78	22	2nd TBJHL	Lost final, Bronze at KC
1984-85	48	24	24	0	-	280	269	48	3rd MJHL-S	Lost quarter-final
1985-86	48	20	27	1	-	232	254	41	4th MJHL-S	Lost quarter-final

=== Playoffs ===
TBJHL Years

- 1983 Won City Jr. B Final, lost City Junior Final, won Keystone Cup Bronze Medal

Thunder Bay Hornets defeated Schreiber North Stars 4-games-to-1 CITY JR. B CHAMPIONS
Thunder Bay Kings defeated Thunder Bay Hornets 3-games-to-none
Third in Keystone Cup round robin WESTERN CANADA JR. B BRONZE MEDALLISTS

- 1984 Won City Jr. B Final, lost City Junior Final, won Keystone Cup Bronze Medal Game

Thunder Bay Hornets defeated Thunder Bay Maple Leafs 2-games-to-1 CITY JR. B CHAMPIONS
Thunder Bay Kings defeated Thunder Bay Hornets 4-games-to-1 with 1 tie
Third in Keystone Cup round robin (1-3)
Thunder Bay Hornets defeated Schreiber North Stars 8-4 WESTERN CANADA JR. B BRONZE MEDALLISTS

MJHL Years

- 1985 Lost quarter-final

St. James Canadians defeated Thunder Bay Hornets 4-games-to-2

- 1986 Lost quarter-final

Winnipeg South Blues defeated Thunder Bay Hornets 4-games-to-none

== See also ==
- Manitoba Junior Hockey League
- Superior International Junior Hockey League
- Thunder Bay Junior A Hockey League
- United States Hockey League
- Hockey Northwestern Ontario
- Canadian Junior A Hockey League
- Dudley Hewitt Cup
- Royal Bank Cup
