= Lee Fogolin =

American ice hockey player (born 1955)

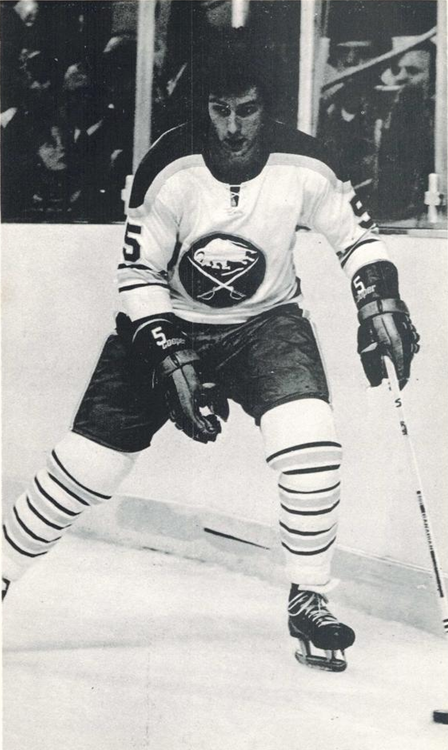
- Born: February 7, 1955 (age 71) Chicago, Illinois, U.S.
- Height: 6 ft 0 in (183 cm)
- Weight: 200 lb (91 kg; 14 st 4 lb)
- Position: Defense
- Shot: Right
- Played for: Buffalo Sabres; Edmonton Oilers
- National team: United States
- NHL draft: 11th overall, 1974; Buffalo Sabres
- Playing career: 1974–1987

Lee Joseph Fogolin (born February 7, 1955) is an American former professional ice hockey player who played in the National Hockey League. He played for the Buffalo Sabres and the Edmonton Oilers, appearing in 924 NHL regular season games between 1974 and 1987, winning the Stanley Cup in 1984 and 1985.

== Early career ==
Fogolin played from 1972–1974 with the Oshawa Generals of the OHA, scoring 52 points in 102 games with 240 PIM. He was drafted in the first round, 11th overall, of the 1974 NHL entry draft by the Buffalo Sabres.

Fogolin chose to play for the Team USA in the 1976 Canada Cup, and was invited again in 1984, but declined to play.

== NHL playing career ==
Fogolin played his first professional season (1974–75) in Buffalo, but split the next season between the Sabres and the AHL Hershey Bears. He was acquired by the Edmonton Oilers for the 1979–1980 season through the NHL Expansion Draft.

Fogolin played seven full seasons with Edmonton, and was named as captain near the end of the 1980–81 season, after Blair MacDonald was traded. He was the first of five Oilers to captain the franchise to the Stanley Cup finals, in 1983, where they lost to the New York Islanders. While a solid defenseman in his own right, he was overshadowed by many of the young stars on the Oilers' roster, most notably the scoring superstar Wayne Gretzky. Fogolin stepped aside as captain in favour of Gretzky, following the 1982–83 season. Fogolin was a member of the Oilers' Stanley Cup wins in 1984 and 1985. Fogolin also played in the 1986 National Hockey League All-Star Game.

Fogolin was re-acquired by the Sabres with Mark Napier for Wayne Van Dorp, Normand Lacombe and future considerations near the end of the 1986–87 season, and retired after completing the season with them.

== Personal ==
Fogolin was born in Chicago while his father, Lee Fogolin Sr., was a member of the Chicago Blackhawks. His father also played for the Detroit Red Wings and won the Stanley Cup in 1950. Fogolin was raised in Thunder Bay, Ontario when his father's career ended.

His 17-year-old son, Michael Fogolin, was a member of the Prince George Cougars in the Western Hockey League, who died in his sleep on May 26, 2004, of a possible heart condition.

Fogolin currently resides in Edmonton, Alberta.

== Awards and achievements ==
- 1983–84 - NHL - Stanley Cup (Edmonton)
- 1984–85 - NHL - Stanley Cup (Edmonton)
- 1985–86 - National Hockey League All-Star Game

== Career statistics ==
| | | | Regular season | | | | | Playoffs |
| Season | Team | League | GP | G | A | Pts | PIM | GP | G | A | Pts | PIM |
|---|---|---|---|---|---|---|---|---|---|---|---|---|
| 1970–71 | Thunder Bay Marrs | TBJHL | — | — | — | — | — | — | — | — | — | — |
| 1970–71 | Thunder Bay Marrs | Cen-Cup | — | — | — | — | — | 5 | 0 | 2 | 2 | 6 |
| 1971–72 | Thunder Bay Marrs | TBJHL | — | — | — | — | — | — | — | — | — | — |
| 1972–73 | Oshawa Generals | OHA-Jr. | 55 | 5 | 21 | 26 | 132 | — | — | — | — | — |
| 1973–74 | Oshawa Generals | OHA-Jr. | 47 | 7 | 19 | 26 | 108 | — | — | — | — | — |
| 1974–75 | Buffalo Sabres | NHL | 50 | 2 | 2 | 4 | 59 | 8 | 0 | 0 | 0 | 6 |
| 1975–76 | Buffalo Sabres | NHL | 58 | 0 | 9 | 9 | 64 | 9 | 0 | 4 | 4 | 23 |
| 1975–76 | Hershey Bears | AHL | 20 | 1 | 8 | 9 | 61 | — | — | — | — | — |
| 1976–77 | Buffalo Sabres | NHL | 71 | 3 | 15 | 18 | 100 | 4 | 0 | 0 | 0 | 2 |
| 1977–78 | Buffalo Sabres | NHL | 76 | 0 | 23 | 23 | 98 | 6 | 0 | 2 | 2 | 23 |
| 1978–79 | Buffalo Sabres | NHL | 74 | 3 | 19 | 22 | 103 | 3 | 0 | 0 | 0 | 4 |
| 1979–80 | Edmonton Oilers | NHL | 80 | 5 | 10 | 15 | 104 | 3 | 0 | 0 | 0 | 4 |
| 1980–81 | Edmonton Oilers | NHL | 80 | 13 | 17 | 30 | 139 | 9 | 0 | 0 | 0 | 12 |
| 1981–82 | Edmonton Oilers | NHL | 80 | 4 | 25 | 29 | 154 | 5 | 1 | 1 | 2 | 14 |
| 1982–83 | Edmonton Oilers | NHL | 72 | 0 | 18 | 18 | 92 | 16 | 0 | 5 | 5 | 36 |
| 1983–84 | Edmonton Oilers | NHL | 80 | 5 | 16 | 21 | 125 | 19 | 1 | 4 | 5 | 23 |
| 1984–85 | Edmonton Oilers | NHL | 79 | 4 | 14 | 18 | 126 | 18 | 3 | 1 | 4 | 16 |
| 1985–86 | Edmonton Oilers | NHL | 80 | 4 | 22 | 26 | 129 | 8 | 0 | 2 | 2 | 10 |
| 1986–87 | Edmonton Oilers | NHL | 35 | 1 | 3 | 4 | 17 | — | — | — | — | — |
| 1986–87 | Buffalo Sabres | NHL | 9 | 0 | 2 | 2 | 8 | — | — | — | — | — |
| NHL totals | | | 924 | 44 | 195 | 239 | 1318 | 108 | 5 | 19 | 24 | 173 |

=== International ===
| Year | Team | Event | GP | G | A | Pts | PIM |
|---|---|---|---|---|---|---|---|
| 1976 | United States | CC | 2 | 0 | 0 | 0 | 6 |

== See also ==
- Notable families in the NHL

| Preceded by Morris Titanic | Buffalo Sabres first-round draft pick 1974 | Succeeded by Bob Sauvé |
| Preceded by Blair MacDonald | Edmonton Oilers captain 1981–83 | Succeeded by Wayne Gretzky |
