= Northwestern Ontario Junior Hockey League =

Ice hockey league

The Northwestern Ontario Junior Hockey League (NWOJHL) was a Canadian Junior ice hockey league in the Northwestern Ontario region of Ontario. The league ran from 1964 until 1970 as members of the Thunder Bay Amateur Hockey Association in direct competition for the Memorial Cup the Grand Championship of Canadian junior hockey.

== History ==
Founded in 1964, the NWOJHL was a Junior A hockey league. In the playoffs, after the league champions were determined, the winner of the NWOJHL would face the champion of the Thunder Bay Junior A Hockey League for the right to move on in the Memorial Cup playoffs. The NWOJHL shared many centres with the North Shore Intermediate Hockey League which competed for the Hardy Cup.

The most prominent team in the league was the Schreiber North Stars, who would later gain fame as one of the top Junior B teams in Ontario and for competing at early Keystone Cups.

In 1970, junior hockey was realigned across Canada. As early as 1969, the NWOJHL dropped to Junior B. It is possible that the NWOJHL became the Thunder Bay Junior B Hockey League in 1970, as it had many of the same teams. The TBJBHL lasted until 1977 when Junior hockey in Thunder Bay all but collapsed. It migrated Eastward and became the North Shore Junior B Hockey League.

== Teams ==
- Atikokan Voyageurs
- Geraldton Goldminers
- Longlac Timber Wolves
- Manitouwadge Copper Kings
- Marathon Mercuries
- Nip-Rock Rangers
- Schreiber North Stars
- Terrace Bay Superiors
- Thunder Bay Blades

== Champions ==
NWOJHL

- 1965 Schreiber North Stars
- 1966 Geraldton Goldminers
- 1967 Geraldton Goldminers
- 1968 Nip-Rock Rangers
- 1969 Schreiber North Stars
- 1970 Schreiber North Stars
- 1971 Schreiber North Stars
- 1972 Schreiber North Stars
- 1973 Marathon Mercuries

Thunder Bay Jr. B

- 1973 Schreiber North Stars (NWO Jr. B Champions)
- 1974 Schreiber North Stars
- 1975 Thunder Bay Blades
- 1976 Atikokan Voyageurs
- 1977 Schreiber North Stars

North Shore Jr. B

- 1978 Marathon Renegades
- 1979 Marathon A's
- 1980 Schreiber North Stars
- 1981 Nip-Rock Rangers
