= Lee Fogolin Sr. =

Canadian ice hockey player

- Born: February 27, 1927 Fort William, Ontario, Canada
- Died: November 29, 2000 (aged 73) Thunder Bay, Ontario, Canada
- Height: 5 ft 11 in (180 cm)
- Weight: 200 lb (91 kg; 14 st 4 lb)
- Position: Defence
- Shot: Left
- Played for: Detroit Red Wings; Chicago Black Hawks
- Playing career: 1946–1957

Lidio John Fogolin (February 27, 1927 — November 29, 2000) was a Canadian professional ice hockey player for the Detroit Red Wings and Chicago Black Hawks of the National Hockey League (NHL) between 1948 and 1956.

== Playing career ==
Fogolin started his professional career with the Omaha Knights of the United States Hockey League in 1946. The next year he played for the Indianapolis Capitals of the American Hockey League. He saw his first NHL action for the Detroit Red Wings in the 1948 playoffs. He began the 1949 season with Indianapolis before being called up to the NHL full-time.

He played the next three seasons with Detroit winning the Stanley Cup with them in 1950. In 1951 he was traded to the Chicago Black Hawks along with Steve Black for Bert Olmstead and Vic Stasiuk. He played the final six years of his career on less-than-impressive Black Hawks teams. In 1957, he signed on as a player-coach of the Calgary Stampeders of the Western Hockey League (WHL). He broke his elbow that season and decided to retire at its conclusion to concentrate on coaching full-time.

== Coaching career ==
Fogolin coached one season in the WHL in 1957. He did not return to coaching until 1971 with the Thunder Bay Twins of the United States Hockey League, where he coached for three seasons.

== Personal life ==
Fogolin played in two NHL All Star Games, in 1950 and 1951. His son Lee Fogolin won the Stanley Cup two times, with the Edmonton Oilers in 1984 and 1985. His grandson Michael Fogolin played for the Prince George Cougars in the WHL and died in his sleep on May 26, 2004, of a possible heart condition.

Fogolin died November 29, 2000.

== Career statistics ==
=== Regular season and playoffs ===
| | | | Regular season | | | | | Playoffs |
| Season | Team | League | GP | G | A | Pts | PIM | GP | G | A | Pts | PIM |
|---|---|---|---|---|---|---|---|---|---|---|---|---|
| 1943–44 | Galt Red Wings | OHA | 22 | 0 | 2 | 2 | 25 | 3 | 0 | 1 | 1 | 2 |
| 1944–45 | Galt Red Wings | OHA | 17 | 3 | 7 | 10 | 32 | 10 | 1 | 3 | 4 | 25 |
| 1945–46 | Galt Red Wings | OHA | 27 | 13 | 24 | 37 | 51 | 5 | 1 | 1 | 2 | 8 |
| 1946–47 | Omaha Knights | USHL | 59 | 2 | 9 | 11 | 117 | 11 | 1 | 3 | 4 | 27 |
| 1947–48 | Indianapolis Capitals | AHL | 65 | 2 | 9 | 11 | 113 | — | — | — | — | — |
| 1947–48 | Detroit Red Wings | NHL | — | — | — | — | — | 2 | 0 | 1 | 1 | 6 |
| 1948–49 | Indianapolis Capitals | AHL | 20 | 2 | 6 | 8 | 30 | — | — | — | — | — |
| 1948–49 | Detroit Red Wings | NHL | 43 | 1 | 2 | 3 | 59 | 9 | 0 | 0 | 0 | 4 |
| 1949–50 | Detroit Red Wings | NHL | 63 | 4 | 8 | 12 | 63 | 10 | 0 | 0 | 0 | 16 |
| 1950–51 | Detroit Red Wings | NHL | 19 | 0 | 1 | 1 | 16 | — | — | — | — | — |
| 1950–51 | Chicago Black Hawks | NHL | 35 | 3 | 10 | 13 | 63 | — | — | — | — | — |
| 1951–52 | Chicago Black Hawks | NHL | 69 | 0 | 9 | 9 | 96 | — | — | — | — | — |
| 1952–53 | Chicago Black Hawks | NHL | 70 | 2 | 8 | 10 | 79 | 7 | 0 | 1 | 1 | 4 |
| 1953–54 | Chicago Black Hawks | NHL | 68 | 0 | 1 | 1 | 95 | — | — | — | — | — |
| 1954–55 | Chicago Black Hawks | NHL | 9 | 0 | 1 | 1 | 16 | — | — | — | — | — |
| 1955–56 | Chicago Black Hawks | NHL | 51 | 0 | 8 | 8 | 83 | — | — | — | — | — |
| 1956–57 | Calgary Stampeders | WHL | 61 | 1 | 9 | 10 | 84 | 3 | 0 | 0 | 0 | 2 |
| NHL totals | | | 427 | 10 | 47 | 57 | 570 | 28 | 0 | 2 | 2 | 30 |
