= Canadian-American Junior Hockey League =

Junior hockey league, 2022–2025

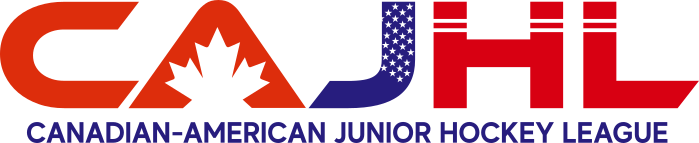
- Sport: Ice hockey
- Founded: 2022
- Folded: 2025
- Commissioner: Bryan Brown
- Last champion: Vegreville Vipers (2024)
- Website: https://www.cajhl.ca

The Canadian-American Junior Hockey League (CAJHL) was a junior hockey league with teams based in Canada. The league was independently operated and insured, and not sanctioned by Hockey Canada, USA Hockey, or the Amateur Athletic Union. The league initially used the title Can-Am Junior Hockey League, but their website later changed to Canadian-American Junior Hockey League.

== History ==
The league was founded in January 2022 when six teams that were competing in the Western States Hockey League (WSHL) severed ties with the Amateur Athletic Union-sanctioned league to form their own. Five of the teams were based in Alberta, Canada, while one was based in Utah, United States. The founding teams were the Barrhead Bombers, Cold Lake Aeros, Edmonton Eagles, Hinton Timberwolves, Vegreville Vipers, and Vernal Oilers.

On March 22, 2022, the league announced that AMP Hockey Academy from Calgary, Alberta, would be the first expansion team named the AMP Warriors and would play at WinSport Canada Olympic Park. On May 6, 2022, the Vernal Oilers joined the United States Premier Hockey League along with former WSHL teams the Seattle Totems, Bellingham Blazers, and Rogue Valley Royals. In August 2022, the Edmonton Eagles were removed from the teams listing on the league website.

By April 2023, the AMP Warriors started using the name Calgary Warriors on the league website. After the 2022–23 season, the league added the Northern Alberta Lightning in Viking, Alberta, the Southern Alberta Mustangs in Stavely, Alberta, and the Vulcan Rampage in Vulcan, Alberta. The Calgary Warriors left the league. The Northern Alberta Lightning were removed from the league prior to playing a game and joined the National Junior Hockey League (NJHL). The Vulcan Rampage quit the league prior to playing a game and also joined the NJHL.

On July 23, 2024 the league announced suspension of the 2024-2025 season with the intention to continue operations in the future. The Barrhead Bombers' ownership announced they would not continue. Teams were tentatively approved for Calmar, Alberta (Calmer Riggers) and Lamont, Alberta.

The CAJHL announced on March 22, 2025, that the league will return for the 2025-26 season. The announcement noted that they had commitments from several teams/communities as well as being in negotiations for expansion locations. On June 10, 2025 the Montana Snowhawks announced they would be joining the league in 2026. The Snowhawks then announced their intentions to join the newly formed Alberta Elite Junior Hockey League for 2026-27. On July 6, 2025 the Cold Lake Aeros announced they ceased operations. On July 29, 2025 the Hinton Timberwolves announced they would no longer continue. On August 1, 2025 the Southern Alberta Mustangs announced they have joined the United States Premier Hockey League (USPHL) playing in a new five team Alberta Division with the Three Hills Titans, Hanna Havoc, Diamond Valley Rockies and Bassano Beavers. On August 1, 2025 the Vegreville Vipers announced that they joined the new AEJHL.

=== Former teams ===
| Team | City | Arena | Established | Tenure |
|---|---|---|---|---|
| Barrhead Bombers | Barrhead, Alberta | Barrhead Agrena | 2021 | 2021–2024 |
| Calgary Warriors | Calgary, Alberta | WinSport Canada Olympic Park | 2022 | 2022–2023 |
| Cold Lake Aeros | Cold Lake, Alberta | Cold Lake Energy Centre | 2018 | 2018–2024 |
| Edmonton Eagles | Enoch, Alberta | Enoch Community Centre | 2021 | 2021–2022 |
| Hinton Timberwolves | Hinton, Alberta | Dr. Duncan Murray Recreation Centre | 2019 | 2019–2024 |
| Northern Alberta Lightning | Viking, Alberta | Viking Carena Complex | 2023 | Did not play |
| Southern Alberta Mustangs | Stavely, Alberta | Stavely Arena | 2023 | 2023–2024 |
| Vegreville Vipers | Vegreville, Alberta | Wally Fedun Arena | 2021 | 2021–2024 |
| Vernal Oilers | Vernal, Utah | Western Park Arena | 2021 | 2021–2022 |
| Vulcan Rampage | Vulcan, Alberta | Vulcan Arena | 2023 | Did not play |

== Champions ==
CAJHL champions
| Season | Regular season | Playoffs | Playoff Runner-up | Result |
|---|---|---|---|---|
| 2021–22 | Cold Lake Aeros | Cold Lake Aeros | Vernal Oilers | 6-1 |
| 2022–23 | Hinton Timberwolves | Hinton Timberwolves | Vegreville Vipers | 7-4 |
| 2023–24 | Hinton Timberwolves | Vegreville Vipers | Hinton Timberwolves | 3-0 (best-of 3) |
