= Thunder Bay Junior A Hockey League =

Canadian junior ice hockey league

The Thunder Bay Junior A Hockey League (TBJHL) was a Canadian junior ice hockey league that existed from c. 1920 to 1980. The TBJHL operated in Northwestern Ontario, primarily in the Thunder Bay region.

The Thunder Bay Junior A Hockey League was what is now known as a Major Junior hockey league from roughly 1920 until the Canadian Amateur Hockey Association realignment of 1970. After 1970, the TBJHL was relegated to Tier II Junior A and competed for the Manitoba Centennial Trophy until the league folded in 1980.

Thunder Bay and the TBJHL was considered on the border region of what people would call Eastern Canada and Western Canada. Due to its location, the Thunder Bay league often switched from East to West year-to-year in National playdowns. The league's remoteness resulted in keeping the league's few teams from competing in the neighbouring Manitoba Junior Hockey League or Northern Ontario Junior Hockey League, making the league's existence a necessity to the region's hockey community.

Thunder Bay Junior A Hockey League teams made the Memorial Cup finals four times in fifty years, winning Canada's top junior hockey prize in 1922 (Fort William War Veterans) and 1948 (Port Arthur West End Bruins).

The TBJHL is the indirect predecessor of the Superior International Junior Hockey League who brought a Junior A league back to the region in 2001, 21 years after the TBJHL folded.

== History ==
Although hockey in Thunder Bay dates back well before 1920, the Thunder Bay Junior Hockey League first competed in Memorial Cup action in 1921. In only their second year of operation at the Junior A level, the league celebrated their first National championship as the Fort William War Veterans defeated the Regina Pats 5-4 and tied them 3–3 to win the championship. To get there, the Vets had to defeat Toronto Aura Lee in the Eastern Canada final, beating them 5–3 in a one-game showdown.

It took 26 years for a team from the Thunder Bay Junior A Hockey League to repeat the feat. In 1947–48, the Port Arthur West End Bruins finished the regular season in first place with a record of 9 wins, no losses, no ties. They were given a berth directly into the league final where they met the Fort William Columbus Canadiens. The first game resulted in a 7–7 tie, and the Bruins won the second game 9–7. Game three sparked some controversy as the game was tied 5-5 and the Columbus Canadiens walked off the ice. In response, the league ruled the game a forfeit in the Bruins favour. Games four and five were won by the Bruins 8-3 and 5–3 to give the series and league championship to the Bruins 4-games-to-none with 1 tie. In the Eastern Canadian semi-final, the Bruins had to play the Manitoba Junior Hockey League's Winnipeg Monarchs. Port Arthur won game one 12–3, game two 6–4, and game three 10–4. The Monarchs started to rally, winning game four 7-5 and game five 5–3. Finally, in game six, the Bruins were able to put the final nail in the coffin as they won 7-2 and took the series 4-games-to-2. Next, Port Arthur found themselves in the Abbott Cup final against the Southern Alberta Junior Hockey League's Lethbridge Native Sons. Lethbridge took game one 6-1 and game two 7–6. Port Arthur came back with a 7–4 win. Lethbridge put the series on the brink with a 5–4 win before Port Arthur came back with three solid victories; 5–0, 6–4, 11–1; to come from behind and take the Abbott Cup. This earned them a berth in the Memorial Cup against the Ontario Hockey Association's Barrie Flyers in Toronto. Ignited by the Abbott Cup final comeback, the Bruins kept on rolling, sweeping the Flyers 4-games-to-none with scores of 10–8, 8–1, 5–4, and 9-8 respectively. This would be the final Memorial Cup won by a TBJHL team.

From the 1964 until 1969, the TBJHL had a rivalry and was in direct competition annually for the TBAHA seed to the Memorial Cup against the neighbouring Northwestern Ontario Junior Hockey League. By 1969, the NWOJHL had dropped to Junior B and may have become the Thunder Bay Junior B Hockey League, the TBJHL's feeder league in the 1970s.

In 1970, the Thunder Bay Junior A Hockey League was caught in the transformation of Junior hockey. In the spring of 1970, the Fort William Westfort Hurricanes defeated the Port Arthur Marrs 3-games-to-2 and the Fort William Canadiens 4-games-to-1 to win the TBJHL championship. They then played the Dauphin Kings of the MJHL in the Abbott Cup semi-final and defeated them 4-games-to-2. This advanced them to the Abbott Cup, essentially the final-four of Canadian junior hockey at the time. Up against the Saskatchewan Junior Hockey League's Weyburn Red Wings, were defeated 4-games-to-2 despite leading 2-games-to-none at one point. Weyburn ended up losing the Memorial Cup final to the Montreal Junior Canadiens. During them summer, the Canadian Amateur Hockey Association decided to demote five of the six Junior A league of Western Canada to Tier II Junior A and rename Junior A to Major Junior. The effected leagues were the BCJHL, AJHL, SJHL, MJHL, and TBJHL. The only league that was left at the Major Junior level was the rebellious Western Canada Junior Hockey League. The five remaining leagues were barred from competing for the Memorial Cup, even though, all but the TBJHL, retained the right to the Abbott Cup. Two leagues remained at Major Junior in Eastern Canada, the Ontario Major Junior Hockey League, formerly known as the OHA, and the Quebec Major Junior Hockey League. All that remained for Tier II Junior A in Eastern Canada were a couple small leagues in Ontario (SOJAHL, CJHL) and even smaller leagues in the Maritime Provinces. To balance the power a bit, the CAHA assigned the TBJHL to the Eastern section of the national playdowns for the first time since 1927.

In 1971, the TBJHL allowed for the expansion of the St. Paul, MN-sponsored Thunder Bay Vulcans. The Vulcans won the league title in their first season. In 1972, the St. Paul group were granted the right to create their own league in Minnesota. They brought the Thunder Bay franchise with them, renaming it the Thunder Bay Centennials, and lured away the Thunder Bay Hurricanes. For the 1972–73 season, the newly formed Can-Am Junior Hockey League was actually allowed to represent the Thunder Bay district at the National level. In 1973–74, the Centennials fled the league and were renamed the Thunder Bay Beavers. The Can-Am league joined USA Hockey and were renamed the Midwest Junior Hockey League. The only Canadian team that remained was the Hurricanes. The Hercs competed in the TBJHL playoffs in 1974, despite not being a league member, and won the region against the crowned league champion Fort William Canadiens. The Hercs returned to the TBJHL full-time for the 1974–75 season.

In 1976, league expanded to 6 teams with the induction of the Atikokan Voyageurs and Thunder Bay Blades.

The 1978–79 season began with the merging of the Beavers, Canadians, and Hurricanes into the Degagne Buccaneers and Case Eagles and Blades into the Thunder Bay North Stars. The Voyageurs folded late in the season and were replaced by the league-bolstered "Rural Voyageurs". For 1979–80, they were replaced by the Nip-Rock Rangers. On June 26, 1980, the league was liquidated in favour of a single Jr. An entity in Thunder Bay—the Thunder Bay Kings. Both the North Stars and Buccaneers went out of business on July 6, 1980, when the TBAHA revoked their Junior A status in favour of what would be the Kings.

In 1980, the Thunder Bay Kings were created as a powerhouse Junior A team and helped create a new league called the Thunder Bay Hockey League with the Sr. A Thunder Bay Twins, Int. A Thunder Bay Blazers, and CIAU Lakehead Nor'Westers. In 1984, they were renamed the Thunder Bay Flyers and joined the United States Hockey League. They won the Anderson Cup as USHL regular season champs in 1988, 1989, 1991, and 1992; the Clark Cup as American Junior A National Champions in 1988 and 1989; the Dudley Hewitt Cup as Central Canadian Champions in 1988, 1989, 1991, 1992, and 1995; the Manitoba Centennial Cup as Canadian Tier II Junior A National Champions in 1989 and 1992. The Flyers folded in 2000.

In 2001, the Superior International Junior Hockey League was formed, following in the footsteps of the Thunder Bay Junior A Hockey League.

== Teams ==
- Atikokan Voyageurs (1976–79)
- Fort Frances Blackhawks (1934–35)
- Fort Frances Royals (1964–69)
- Fort William Canadians:

- Fort William Columbus Club (1935-43)
- Fort William Columbus Club Millers (1943-46)
- Fort William Columbus Club Canadiens (1946-49)
- Fort William Canadiens (1949-68)
- Fort William Canadians (1968-78)
- merged with Degagne Hurricanes and Thunder Bay Beavers

- Fort William East End (1945–46)
- Fort William Juniors:

- Fort William Juniors (c. 1925-29 and 1930-35)
- Fort William Legion (1929-30)
- Fort William Kams (1935-36)

- Fort William St. Andrews:

- Fort William North Stars (c. 1925-26)
- Fort William St. Andrews (1926-31)

- Fort William Westfort Maroons (1929–1939)
- HMCS Griffon (1943–45)
- Kenora Thistles (1927–30)
- Nip-Rock Rangers (1978–80)
- Port Arthur MacDonald-Cartier (1934–35)

- Port Arthur Marrs:

- Port Arthur Juniors (c. 1925-43 and 1946-49)
- Port Arthur Flyers (1943-46 and 1950-53)
- Port Arthur North Stars (1953-66)
- Port Arthur Marrs (1966-70)
- Thunder Bay Marrs (1970-71)
- Thunder Bay "Case" Eagles (1971-78)
- merged with Thunder Bay Blades
- Thunder Bay North Stars (1978-80)

- Port Arthur West End:

- Port Arthur West End (c. 1925-32 and 1933-46)
- Port Arthur West End Retrievers (1932-33)
- Port Arthur West End Bruins (1946-55)

- Thunder Bay Beavers:

- Thunder Bay Vulcans (1971-72)
- Thunder Bay Centennials (1972-73)
- Thunder Bay Beavers (1973-78)
- merged with Fort William Canadians and Degagne Hurricanes

- Thunder Bay Blades (1976–78)

- merged with Thunder Bay Eagles

- Westfort Hurricanes:

- Fort William Hurricane-Rangers (1940-50)
- Fort William Hurricanes (1950-66)
- Westfort Hurricanes (1966-72)
- Thunder Bay Westfort Hurricanes (1972-75)
- Degagne Hurricanes (1975-78)
- merged with Fort William Canadians and Thunder Bay Beavers
- Degagne Buccaneers (1978-80)

=== Minnesota merger teams (1971-73) ===
- St. Paul Vulcans

- Minnesota Jr. Stars (1971-1972)
- St. Paul Jr. Stars (1972-1973)
- St. Paul Vulcans (1973)

- Minneapolis Jr. Bruins

== Playoff champions ==
The winner of the TBJHL Playoffs was awarded the Jack Adams Trophy as Thunder Bay Amateur Hockey Association Junior "A" Champions. Since this was a branch championship, Champions from the North Shore or Kenora-Fort Frances Leagues were eligible to challenge for it. The TBJHL Champions probably exclusively won the Bill Fero Trophy as Lakehead Junior Champions.

Major Junior
- 1921 Fort William YMCA
- 1922 Fort William War Veterans
- 1923 Fort William Cubs
- 1924 Kenora Thistles
- 1925 Fort William Cubs
- 1926 Fort William Juniors
- 1927 Port Arthur West End
- 1928 Kenora Thistles
- 1929 Kenora Thistles
- 1930 Fort William Legion
- 1931 Fort William Westfort Maroons
- 1932 Port Arthur Juniors
- 1933 Port Arthur Juniors
- 1934 Port Arthur West End
- 1935 Port Arthur Juniors
- 1936 Fort William Kams
- 1937 Port Arthur Juniors
- 1938 Port Arthur West End
- 1939 Fort William Columbus Club
- 1940 Port Arthur Juniors
- 1941 Port Arthur Juniors
- 1942 Fort William Hurricane-Rangers
- 1943 Fort William Hurricane-Rangers
- 1944 Port Arthur Flyers
- 1945 Port Arthur West End Bruins
- 1946 Port Arthur Flyers
- 1947 Fort William Columbus Club
- 1948 Port Arthur West End Bruins
- 1949 Port Arthur West End Bruins
- 1950 Port Arthur West End Bruins
- 1951 Port Arthur West End Bruins
- 1952 Fort William Hurricanes
- 1953 Fort William Columbus Canadiens
- 1954 Fort William Columbus Canadiens
- 1955 Fort William Canadiens
- 1956 Port Arthur North Stars
- 1957 Fort William Canadiens
- 1958 Fort William Canadiens
- 1959 Fort William Canadiens
- 1960 Fort William Hurricanes
- 1961 Fort William Canadiens
- 1962 Port Arthur North Stars
- 1963 Fort William Canadiens
- 1964 Fort William Canadiens
- 1965 Port Arthur North Stars
- 1966 Fort William Canadiens
- 1967 Port Arthur Marrs
- 1968 Westfort Hurricanes
- 1969 Westfort Hurricanes
- 1970 Westfort Hurricanes

Tier II Junior A

- 1971 Thunder Bay Marrs
- 1972 Thunder Bay Vulcans*
- 1973 St. Paul Jr. Stars*
- 1974 Thunder Bay Hurricanes**
- 1975 Thunder Bay Case Eagles
- 1976 Thunder Bay Case Eagles
- 1977 Thunder Bay Case Eagles
- 1978 Degagne Hurricanes
- 1979 Thunder Bay North Stars
- 1980 Thunder Bay North Stars

(*) denotes that the champions were members of a joint Thunder Bay-Minnesota/Can-Am League.
(**) denotes that the Hurricanes rejoined the TBJHL for the playoffs, participated in different league during regular season.

== National playdowns ==
=== Memorial Cup ===
National Champions.

Champions

1922: - Fort William War Veterans defeated Regina Pats (SJHL) 8-goals-to-7 in 2 games
1948: - Port Arthur West End Bruins defeated Barrie Flyers (OHA) 4-games-to-none

Finalists

1927: - Owen Sound Greys (OHA) defeated Port Arthur West End 2-games-to-none
1967: - Toronto Marlboros (OHA) defeated Port Arthur Marrs 4-games-to-1

=== George Richardson Memorial Trophy ===
Eastern Canadian Champions.

Champions

1922: - Fort William War Veterans defeated Toronto Aura Lee (OHA) 5-3 sudden-death

Finalists

1924: - Owen Sound Greys (OHA) defeated Kenora Thistles 15-goals-to-12 in 2 games
1926: - Kingston Giants (OHA) defeated Fort William Juniors 5-goals-to-4 in 2 games

=== Abbott Cup ===
Western Canadian Champions.

Champions

1927: - Port Arthur West End defeated Regina Pats (SJHL) 5-goals-to-3 in 2 games
1948: - Port Arthur West End Bruins defeated Lethbridge Native Sons (SAJHL) 4-games-to-3
1967: - Port Arthur Marrs defeated New Westminster Royals (OMJHL) 4-games-to-1

Finalists

1921: - Winnipeg Falcons (MJHL) defeated Fort William YMCA 20-goals-to-7 in 2 games
1923: - University of Manitoba (MJHL) defeated Fort William Cubs 9-goals-to-4 in 2 games
1925: - Regina Pats (SJHL) defeated Fort William Juniors 7-goals-to-4 in 2 games
1928: - Regina Pats (SJHL) defeated Kenora Thistles 11-goals-to-4 in 2 games
1934: - Edmonton Athletic Club (EJHL) defeated Port Arthur West End 11-goals-to-3 in 2 games
1944: - Trail Smoke Eaters (KJHL) defeated Port Arthur Flyers 3-games-to-none
1950: - Regina Pats (WCJHL) defeated Port Arthur West End Bruins 4-games-to-1
1952: - Regina Pats (WCJHL) defeated Fort William Columbus Canadiens 4-games-to-2
1954: - Edmonton Oil Kings (WCJHL) defeated Fort William Columbus Canadiens 4-games-to-1
1956: - Regina Pats (WCJHL) defeated Port Arthur North Stars 4-games-to-3
1957: - Flin Flon Bombers (SJHL) defeated Fort William Canadiens 4-games-to-none
1970: - Weyburn Red Wings (SJHL) defeated Fort William Westfort Hurricanes 4-games-to-2

=== Eastern Centennial Cup semi-final champions ===
| Year | Champion | Finalist | Host |
|---|---|---|---|
| 1974 | Thunder Bay Hurricanes | Wexford Raiders (OPJHL) | -- |

== League awards ==
- Walter Risi Memorial Trophy (Top Goaltender)
- Jack Humphries Trophy (Top Defenceman)
- Stan Robertson Memorial Trophy (Top Centreman)
- Frank Sargent Trophy (Leading Scorer)
- George Budd Trophy (Most Gentlemanly Player)
- Baarts Memory Diamond Trophy (Rookie of the Year)
- J.T. Russell Trophy (Most Valuable Player)

== Thunder Bay Hockey League ==
In 1980, the Thunder Bay Junior A Hockey League had been reduced to three teams: the Degagne Buccaneers, Thunder Bay North Stars, and Nip-Rock Rangers or nearby Nipigon, Ontario. Instead of continuing with the slowly faltering league, the Thunder Bay Amateur Hockey Association decided it would more efficient to form a Citywide superleague with one top-level team from each major level. In the league would be the Thunder Bay Twins (eligible for the Allan Cup), Thunder Bay Blazers (Hardy Cup), Thunder Bay Kings (Centennial Cup), and Lakehead Nor'Wester (University Cup).

By 1982 the Blazers merged with the Twins as the Intermediate level was ended by the Canadian Amateur Hockey Association, the Twins moved to the Central Senior Amateur Hockey League in Manitoba, and the Nor'Westers moved into the Ontario University Association. The League was rearranged into a multi-tier Junior league with the Kings at the Jr. A level, the new Thunder Bay Hornets and Schreiber North Stars at Jr. B, eligible for the newly created Keystone Cup. Schreiber left after one year and were replaced by the Thunder Bay Maple Leafs. In 1984, the league was disbanded. The Kings changed their names to the Flyers and joined the United States Hockey League, the Maple Leafs folded, and the Hornets were promoted to the Manitoba Junior Hockey League.

=== Teams ===
- Lakehead Nor'Westers (CIAU) 1980–82
- Schreiber North Stars (Jr. B) 1982–83
- Thunder Bay Blazers (Int. A) 1980–82
- Thunder Bay Hornets (Jr. B) 1982–84
- Thunder Bay Kings (Jr. A) 1980–84
- Thunder Bay Maple Leafs (Jr. B) 1983–84
- Thunder Bay Twins (Sr. A) 1980–82

=== City champions ===
- 1981 Thunder Bay Twins
- 1982 Thunder Bay Kings
- 1983 Thunder Bay Kings
- 1984 Thunder Bay Kings
