= Glen Cochrane =

Canadian ice hockey player (1958–2024)

- Born: January 29, 1958 Kamloops, British Columbia, Canada
- Died: January 13, 2024 (aged 65) Kelowna, British Columbia, Canada
- Height: 6 ft 2 in (188 cm)
- Weight: 210 lb (95 kg; 15 st 0 lb)
- Position: Defence
- Shot: Left
- Played for: Philadelphia Flyers; Vancouver Canucks; Chicago Blackhawks; Edmonton Oilers
- NHL draft: 50th overall, 1978; Philadelphia Flyers
- Playing career: 1978–1989

Glen MacLeod Cochrane (January 29, 1958 – January 13, 2024) was a Canadian professional ice hockey defenceman who played ten seasons in the National Hockey League (NHL) for the Philadelphia Flyers, Vancouver Canucks, Chicago Blackhawks, and Edmonton Oilers, mostly with the Flyers. Cochrane was born in Kamloops, British Columbia, but grew up in Cranbrook, British Columbia.

In the 1981-82 NHL season, Cochrane was assessed 329 penalty minutes, the third-highest in the league that season despite playing in only 63 games. Cochrane was traded by the Flyers to the Vancouver Canucks at the trade deadline of the 1984-85 season in exchange for a third-round pick in the 1986 NHL entry draft.

Following his playing career, Cochrane became an assistant coach with the WHL Kelowna Rockets from 1995-1998, and became a Western Canada amateur scout with the Colorado Avalanche from 2001 to 2007 and the Anaheim Ducks from 2007 until his death. He was diagnosed with cancer in 2023, and died from the disease on January 13, 2024, at the age of 65.

== Career statistics ==
| | | | Regular season | | | | | Playoffs |
| Season | Team | League | GP | G | A | Pts | PIM | GP | G | A | Pts | PIM |
|---|---|---|---|---|---|---|---|---|---|---|---|---|
| 1974–75 | Merritt Centennials | BCJHL | 26 | 0 | 9 | 9 | 76 | — | — | — | — | — |
| 1974–75 | The Pass Red Devils | AJHL | 16 | 1 | 4 | 5 | 61 | — | — | — | — | — |
| 1975–76 | The Pass Red Devils | AJHL | 60 | 17 | 42 | 59 | 210 | — | — | — | — | — |
| 1975–76 | Calgary Centennials | WCHL | 6 | 0 | 0 | 0 | 0 | — | — | — | — | — |
| 1976–77 | Calgary Centennials | WCHL | 35 | 1 | 5 | 6 | 105 | — | — | — | — | — |
| 1976–77 | Pincher Creek Panthers | AJHL | 3 | 2 | 1 | 3 | 17 | — | — | — | — | — |
| 1976–77 | Victoria Cougars | WCHL | 36 | 1 | 7 | 8 | 60 | 4 | 0 | 0 | 0 | 31 |
| 1977–78 | Victoria Cougars | WCHL | 72 | 7 | 40 | 47 | 311 | 13 | 1 | 5 | 6 | 51 |
| 1978–79 | Philadelphia Flyers | NHL | 1 | 0 | 0 | 0 | 0 | — | — | — | — | — |
| 1978–79 | Maine Mariners | AHL | 76 | 1 | 22 | 23 | 320 | 10 | 3 | 4 | 7 | 24 |
| 1979–80 | Maine Mariners | AHL | 77 | 1 | 11 | 12 | 269 | 8 | 2 | 0 | 2 | 83 |
| 1980–81 | Philadelphia Flyers | NHL | 31 | 1 | 8 | 9 | 219 | 6 | 1 | 1 | 2 | 18 |
| 1980–81 | Maine Mariners | AHL | 38 | 4 | 13 | 17 | 201 | — | — | — | — | — |
| 1981–82 | Philadelphia Flyers | NHL | 63 | 6 | 12 | 18 | 329 | 2 | 0 | 0 | 0 | 2 |
| 1982–83 | Philadelphia Flyers | NHL | 77 | 2 | 22 | 24 | 237 | 3 | 0 | 0 | 0 | 4 |
| 1983–84 | Philadelphia Flyers | NHL | 67 | 7 | 16 | 23 | 225 | — | — | — | — | — |
| 1984–85 | Philadelphia Flyers | NHL | 18 | 0 | 3 | 3 | 100 | — | — | — | — | — |
| 1984–85 | Hershey Bears | AHL | 9 | 0 | 8 | 8 | 35 | — | — | — | — | — |
| 1985–86 | Vancouver Canucks | NHL | 49 | 0 | 3 | 3 | 125 | 2 | 0 | 0 | 0 | 5 |
| 1986–87 | Vancouver Canucks | NHL | 14 | 0 | 0 | 0 | 52 | — | — | — | — | — |
| 1987–88 | Chicago Blackhawks | NHL | 73 | 1 | 8 | 9 | 204 | 5 | 0 | 0 | 0 | 2 |
| 1988–89 | Chicago Blackhawks | NHL | 6 | 0 | 0 | 0 | 13 | — | — | — | — | — |
| 1988–89 | Edmonton Oilers | NHL | 12 | 0 | 0 | 0 | 52 | — | — | — | — | — |
| NHL totals | | | 411 | 17 | 72 | 89 | 1556 | 18 | 1 | 1 | 2 | 31 |
