= Blackfalds Bulldogs =

Junior ice hockey team

- City: Blackfalds, Alberta
- League: British Columbia Hockey League
- Founded: 2021
- Home arena: Eagle Builders Centre
- Colours: Black, white, grey, tan
- Owner(s): Doug Quinn, Jodie Quinn
- President: Doug Quinn
- General manager: Al Parada
- Head coach: Vacant
- Website: blackfaldsbulldogs.com; bulldogsclub.ca

Franchise history
- 1972–1976: The Pass Red Devils
- 1976–1978: Pincher Creek Panthers
- 1978–1979: Calgary Chinooks
- 1979–1990: Calgary Spurs
- 1990–2010: Calgary Royals
- 2010–2019: Calgary Mustangs
- 2021–present: Blackfalds Bulldogs

The Blackfalds Bulldogs is a junior ice hockey team based in Blackfalds, Alberta, Canada, that plays in the Interior East Division of the British Columbia Hockey League (BCHL). Their inaugural season in Blackfalds was in 2021–22. The team is owned by Doug Quinn and Jodie Quinn. The team plays at the Eagle Builders Centre in Blackfalds. The team left the Alberta Junior Hockey League to join the BCHL midway through the 2023–24 season.

== History ==
After several seasons of struggling financially, the Calgary Mustangs of the AJHL commenced negotiations to relocate its franchise to Strathmore. After the relocation deal fell through, the team requested a leave of absence from the AJHL for the 2019–20 season. The AJHL approved the request in May 2019, allowing the Calgary Mustangs to explore either a more viable future in Calgary or a relocation. A few months later, the AJHL approved the purchase of the Mustangs by Doug Quinn, a businessman from Red Deer, and the relocation of the franchise to Blackfalds to begin to play in the 2021–22 season. The franchise announced its team name, the Blackfalds Bulldogs, in April 2020.

On January 20, 2024, it was announced that the team, along with four other AJHL teams, would join the BCHL in the 2024-2025 season. The AJHL responded to the announcement by cancelling most of the five teams' remaining scheduled matches except those between each other. It was then decided that the five Alberta-based teams would play out the rest of the 2023-24 season as a separate division under the aegis of the BCHL.

== Team firsts ==
- The new arena in Blackfalds (the Eagle Builders Centre) was not completed in time for the start of the 2021-22 season. Instead games in the exhibition season and the first part of the regular season were held in alternate locations around Alberta. These alternate Bulldogs’ home game locations included Bonnyville, Stettler, Lacombe, Penhold, and Red Deer.
- The very first regular-season game for the Bulldogs was a 17-0 blowout at the hands of the Brooks Bandits on Sep. 17, 2021, in Brooks, AB. The first game at home in the Eagle Builders Centre for the Bulldogs was on Oct. 19, 2021, in a 4-2 win over the Calgary Canucks.
- The first-ever AJHL goal scored by a member of the Blackfalds Bulldogs occurred in an exhibition game on Sep. 1, 2021, and was credited to Jayden Joly (2:08 of the 1st period, shorthanded, assisted by Ty McRuvie and Kai Matthew). The first regular-season goal scored for the Blackfalds Bulldogs was on Sep. 18, 2021, when Jayden Joly's shot found the back of the net (18:47 of the first period, powerplay goal, assists to Ethan Lund and Kyle Uganecz). The first home regular-season goal in the newly completed Eagle Builders Centre was on Nov 19, 2021, and was scored by Carter Yarish (shorthanded, assisted by Jace Benvie) at 5:56 of the first period.
- On Dec 31, 2021, the Bulldogs debuted their alternate 3rd, a tan-colored “B” with a spiked collar underneath, at a home game against the Brooks Bandits. It was again worn in a Jan 21, 2022, home game against the Olds Grizzlys. On Feb 18, 2022, the Bulldogs debuted their 'Pink Power' jerseys, a pink version of their alternate 3rd jersey, at a home game against the Bonnyville Pontiacs. It was again worn on Feb. 23, 2022 in a home game against the Camrose Kodiaks.

== Season-by-season record ==
For previous teams' records, see Calgary Mustangs.
Note: GP = Games played, W = Wins, L = Losses, T = Ties, OTL = Overtime Losses, GF = Goals for, GA = Goals against, Pts = Points

=== Alberta Junior Hockey League ===
Season	GP	W	L	T	OTL	GF	GA	Pts	Finish	Playoffs
2021–22	60	28	31	0	1	189	236	57	5th of 8, South; 11th of 16, AJHL	Lost 1st round, 4-0 (Oilers)
2022–23	60	39	18	0	1	252	174	81	2nd of 8, South; 3rd of 16, AJHL	Won 1st round, 4-1 (Canucks); Won 2nd round, 4-3 (Dragons); Lost 3rd round, 4-0 (Bandits)
2023–24	48	30	15	0	2	193	153	63	Did not complete season	Did not qualify

=== British Columbia Junior Hockey League ===
Season	GP	W	L	T	OTL	GF	GA	Pts	Finish	Playoffs
2023–24	20	9	7	0	3	68	81	22	3rd of 5, Alberta	Lost 1st round, 4-0 (Crusaders)
2024–25	54	15	37	0	2	144	235	32	11th of 11, Interior; 20th of 21 BCHL	Did Not Qualify'

BC

=== Team records ===
Statistic	Player	Season	Record
Games played (Season)	Brett Meerman	2021-22	60
Points (Season)	Brett Meerman	2022-23	94
PPG (Season)	Tyler Wallace	2022-23	19
SHG (Season)	Jason Siedem	2021-22	4
GWG (Season)	Tyler Wallace	2022-23	7
PIM (Season)	Kody Willick	2022-23	78
Wins (Season)	Lucas Massie	2021-22	15
Goalie Points (Season)	Lucas Massie	2021-22	2
SO (Season)	Brock Lott	2021-22	1
Mins (Season)	Lucas Massie	2021-22	1954
GAA (Season, min 10 games)	Lucas Massie	2021-22	3.38
Saves (Season)	Lucas Massie	2021-22	898
SV% (Season, min 10 games)	Lucas Massie	2021-22	0.891

=== Coaches ===
Updated March 3, 2022

- Doug Quinn (Head Coach)
- Al Parada (Asst. Coach)
- Mike Moller (Asst. Coach)
- Pete Friestadt (Goalie Coach)
- Masi Marjamaki (Skills Coach)
- Mike Elchuk (Athletic Therapist and Equipment Manager)
- Brady Bakke (Assoc. Coach)
- Rob Hamill (Assoc. Coach)

=== Business operations ===
Updated March 3, 2022

- Mark Stiles (VP Business Operations)
- Michelle Brown (Community Relations)
- Braden Malsbury (Broadcaster)
- Katie Bradley (Game Day Supervisor)
- Josh Hall (Team Writer)
- David Leonard (Governor)

=== Hockey operations ===
Updated March 3, 2022

- Doug Quinn (Head Coach)
- Al Parada (Asst. Coach)
- Adam West (Asst. GM)
- Dr. Guy Tetrault (Academic Advisor)

=== Board of directors ===
Updated March 3, 2022

- Duston Moore (Executive Director)
- Gordon Mathers
- Kevin Walsh
- Myles Peake
- Vern Crone

=== Game day action photographers ===
Season	Lead Photographer	Photographer	Apprentice
2021-22	Robert Raincock	Shawn Cruikshank	Jordin Downey
2022-23	Xander Holcomb	- -	Madison Fox

== See also ==
- List of ice hockey teams in Alberta
