= Calgary Cowboys (AJHL) =

- City: Calgary, Alberta
- League: Alberta Junior Hockey League
- Operated: 1963–65

The Calgary Cowboys were a Junior A ice hockey team in the Alberta Junior Hockey League based out of Calgary, Alberta. They were one of the five founding members of the AJHL in 1963. The Cowboys lasted only two years before ceasing operations.

In 1963–64, the Cowboys lost to the Calgary Buffaloes for the inaugural AJHL championship three games to one.

The team folded prior to the 1965–66 season with most players moving to the cross town Buffaloes. One season later, in 1966–67, the Buffaloes resurrected the Cowboys name, which they would retain until their demise in 1969–70.

== Season-by-season record ==
Note: GP = games played, W = wins, L = losses, T = ties, Pts = points, GF = goals for, GA = goals against

Season	GP	W	L	T	GF	GA	Points	Finish	Playoffs
1963-64^{1}	NA	NA	NA	NA	NA	NA	NA	NA	Lost final
1964-65	-	-	-	-	-	-	-	---	

^{1}No regular season was played in 1963–64, league had a playoff only to determine champion

== See also ==
- List of ice hockey teams in Alberta
- Ice hockey in Calgary
- Calgary Canucks
- Calgary Spurs
- Calgary Royals
