= Calgary Mustangs (ice hockey) =

Canadian junior A ice hockey team

- City: Calgary, Alberta
- League: Alberta Junior Hockey League
- Division: South
- Founded: 1990
- Home arena: Father David Bauer Olympic Arena
- Colours: Navy blue and gold

Franchise history
- 1972–1976: The Pass Red Devils
- 1976–1978: Pincher Creek Panthers
- 1978–1979: Calgary Chinooks
- 1979–1990: Calgary Spurs
- 1990–2010: Calgary Royals
- 2010–2019: Calgary Mustangs
- 2021–: Blackfalds Bulldogs

The Calgary Mustangs were a junior A ice hockey team in the Alberta Junior Hockey League (AJHL). They played in Calgary, Alberta, Canada, at the Father David Bauer Olympic Arena. They were known as the Calgary Royals from 1990 until 2010. On May 4, 2019, it was announced that the Mustangs had elected to take a leave of absence for the 2019–20 season.

== History ==
The logo of the Calgary Royals, used until 2010

The franchise began play in the 1972–73 season as The Pass Red Devils based in Crowsnest Pass, Alberta. The Red Devils franchise lasted four years before relocating to the nearby community of Pincher Creek to become the Pincher Creek Panthers. The team lasted two seasons in Pincher Creek before relocating to Calgary to become the Calgary Chinooks. In 1979–80, under a new ownership group, the Chinooks became the Calgary Spurs.

Following the 1989–90 season, the Spurs ceased operations, leaving the AJHL with just seven franchises. The league opted to keep a second Calgary-based franchise along with the Calgary Canucks, and sold a new franchise to four local businessmen who named it the Calgary Jr. "A" Royals with the mandate of providing Calgary and area kids with the opportunity to combine a high level of hockey with a quality education.

The Royals were immediately successful, finishing second in the regular season standings, behind the Fort Saskatchewan Traders and winning the league championship in their first season. The Royals were unable to duplicate that success, as the team failed to make it past the second round of the playoffs since winning the title.

Faced with the challenges of sharing a market with the National Hockey League, Western Hockey League, and another AJHL team, the Royals were supported through corporate partnerships and volunteers. Seeking to distinguish itself from the city's minor hockey program of the same name, the franchise renamed itself the Mustangs prior to the 2010–11 season.

After several seasons of struggling financially, the Mustangs were granted a leave of absence for the 2019–20 season.

The Mustangs are approved to move to Blackfalds, Alberta for the 2021–22 season, after being sold to Doug Quinn.

== Season-by-season record ==
Note: GP = Games played, W = Wins, L = Losses, T/OTL = Ties/Overtime losses, SOL = Shootout losses, Pts = Points, GF = Goals for, GA = Goals against

Season	GP	W	L	T/OTL	SOL	Pts	GF	GA	Finish	Playoffs
1990–91	60	34	18	4	—	72	247	179	2nd Overall	Won quarterfinals, 4–0 (Canucks); Won semifinals, 4–0 (Oil Barons); Won AJHL Championship, 4–2 (Traders); Lost Doyle Cup, 1–4 (Vernon Lakers of the BCHL)
1991–92	60	40	19	—	1	81	346	252	2nd Overall	Lost quarterfinals, 2–4 (Blazers)
1992–93	56	28	27	—	1	57	208	208	6th Overall	Lost quarterfinals, 0–5 (Grizzlys)
1993–94	57	26	27	—	3	55	200	238	6th Overall	Lost quarterfinals, 0–4 (Grizzlys)
1994–95	56	25	30	—	1	51	234	252	6th Overall	Lost quarterfinals, 1–4 (Oil Barons)
1995–96	60	23	33	—	4	50	203	244	8th Overall	Lost quarterfinals, 1–4 (Canucks)
1996–97	60	17	40	—	3	37	175	262	11th Overall	Did not qualify
1997–98	60	24	32	—	4	52	196	235	9th Overall	Did not qualify
1998–99	62	39	21	—	2	80	320	243	2nd South	Lost quarterfinals, 0–4 (Grizzlys)
1999–00	64	29	30	—	5	63	255	253	4th South	Lost preliminary series, 0–3 (Eagles)
2000–01	64	25	33	6	—	56	280	328	6th South	Won Preliminary series, 3–1 (Canucks); Lost quarterfinals, 2–4 (Kodiaks)
2001–02	64	32	29	3	—	67	228	232	4th South	Won Preliminary series, 3–2 (Canucks); Lost quarterfinals, 3–4 (Eagles)
2002–03	64	36	25	3	—	75	246	217	4th South	Lost preliminary series, 1–4 (Grizzlys)
2003–04	60	34	23	3	—	71	231	173	4th South	Won Preliminary series, 3–0 (Eagles); Lost quarterfinals, 1–4 (Kodiaks)
2004–05	64	27	32	5	—	59	207	237	5th South	Lost preliminary series, 0–3 (Eagles)
2005–06	60	16	38	6	—	71	231	173	8th South	Did not qualify
2006–07	60	30	30	0	—	60	184	209	5th South	Lost preliminary series, 1–3 (Bandits)
2007–08	62	19	41	2	—	40	148	230	8th South	Did not qualify
2008–09	62	8	48	6	—	22	158	300	8th South	Did not qualify
2009–10	60	21	29	10	—	52	213	255	7th South	Lost preliminary series, 2–3 (Kodiaks)
2010–11	60	28	31	1	—	57	202	235	4th South	Won Preliminary series, 3–0 (Grizzlys); Lost quarterfinals, 0–4 (Oilers)
2011–12	60	31	22	7	—	69	194	188	4th South	Lost div. quarter-finals, 1–3 (Grizzlys)
2012–13	60	21	31	7	—	50	177	218	6th South	Lost div. quarter-finals, 1–3 (Kodiaks)
2013–14	60	26	28	6	—	58	176	206	6th South	Lost div. quarter-finals, 0–3 (Dragons)
2014–15	60	20	36	4	—	55	174	229	7th South	Lost div. quarter-finals, 0–3 (Bandits)
2015–16	60	12	44	4	—	28	168	295	8th of 8, South; 15th of 16, AJHL	Did not qualify
2016–17	60	8	50	2	—	18	135	344	8th of 8, South; 16th of 16, AJHL	Did not qualify
2017–18	60	24	29	7	—	55	194	248	5th of 8, South; 10th of 16, AJHL	Lost div. quarter-finals, 0–3 (Kodiaks)
2018–19	60	29	22	9	—	67	221	192	5th of 8, South; 9th of 16, AJHL	Lost div. quarter-finals, 2–3 (Kodiaks)

== NHL alumni ==
Some of the players that played on the Royals that went on to play in the NHL include:

- T. J. Galiardi
- Cale Hulse
- Krystofer Kolanos
- Tyler Sloan
- Jay Beagle
- Brandon Kozun

== See also ==
- List of ice hockey teams in Alberta
- Ice hockey in Calgary
- Calgary Buffaloes (AJHL)
- Calgary Cowboys (AJHL)
