= Calgary Chinooks =

Former Canadian junior hockey team

- City: Calgary, Alberta
- League: Alberta Junior Hockey League
- Founded: 1972

Franchise history
- 1972–1976: The Pass Red Devils
- 1976–1978: Pincher Creek Panthers
- 1978–1979: Calgary Chinooks
- 1979–1990: Calgary Spurs
- 1990–2010: Calgary Royals
- 2010–2019: Calgary Mustangs
- 2021–: Blackfalds Bulldogs

The Calgary Chinooks were a junior "A" ice hockey team in the Alberta Junior Hockey League (AJHL) based in Calgary, Alberta, Canada.

== History ==
Founded in 1972 as The Pass Red Devils, the team relocated to Pincher Creek to become the Pincher Creek Panthers for the 1976–77 season. The team lasted two years in Pincher Creek before relocating again to Calgary to become the Calgary Chinooks. After one season, they were renamed the Calgary Spurs. The franchise was renamed twice more to the Calgary Royals in 1990 and the Calgary Mustangs in 2010.

== Season-by-season record ==
Note: GP = games played, W = wins, L = losses, T = ties, Pts = points, GF = goals for, GA = goals against

Season	GP	W	L	T	Pts	GF	GA	Finish	Playoffs
1978–79	60	23	37	0	46	262	315	5th	Did not qualify

== See also ==
- List of ice hockey teams in Alberta
