= Red Deer Rustlers =

- City: Red Deer, Alberta
- League: Alberta Junior Hockey League
- Division: South
- Operated: 1967–89

The Red Deer Rustlers were a Junior A ice hockey team in the Alberta Junior Hockey League based in Red Deer, Alberta. They captured the inaugural Centennial Trophy in 1971. Their eight AJHL championships remains the second most in league history, behind the Calgary Canucks ten championships.

Division titles won: 1982–83, 83–84, 84–85, 88–89
Regular season titles won: 1970–71, 73–74, 79–80, 84–85, 88–89
League Championships won: 1970, 71, 72, 74, 80, 85, 87, 89
Doyle Cup Titles: none (captured 3 AB/BC titles before the creation of the Doyle Cup)
Centennial Trophy Titles: 1971, 80

== History ==
The Rustlers joined the AJHL in 1967 on the orders of the Alberta Amateur Hockey Association, which blocked their attempt at joining the Western Canada Hockey League as an expansion team. The Rustlers would quickly rise to the top of the AJHL, capturing four league titles in five years between 1970 and 1974. In 1971, they captured the first Centennial Trophy as Canadian Junior A national champions. The Rustlers repeated that feat in 1980.

During this time, the Rustlers developed many players who would go on to play major-junior or college hockey, while 20 ultimately played in the National Hockey League. Among them were all six members of the Sutter family to play in the NHL: Brian, Darryl, Duane, Brent, Ron and Rich. Gary Sutter, the seventh, and only, brother not to play in the NHL turned down an invitation to play for the Rustlers in 1972.

In 1989, after winning their eighth league championship, the Rustlers were expelled from the league for violating its by-laws. The team remained suspended until 1992 when it officially folded, making room for the Red Deer Rebels, as the central Alberta city finally joined the WHL.

== Season-by-season record ==
Note: GP = Games played, W = Wins, L = Losses, T = Ties Pts = Points, GF = Goals for, GA = Goals against

Season	GP	W	L	T	GF	GA	Points	Finish	Playoffs
1967–68	-	-	-	-	-	-	-	---	
1968–69	-	-	-	-	-	-	-	---	
1969–70	50	26	16	8	222	185	60	2nd overall	Won championship
1970–71	50	30	11	9	216	172	69	1st overall	Won championship and Centennial Trophy
1971–72	48	33	15	0	264	174	66	2nd overall	Won championship
1972–73	60	43	15	2	366	234	88	2nd overall	Lost final
1973–74	60	39	18	3	329	240	81	1st overall	Won championship
1974–75	60	26	32	2	267	299	54	5th overall	
1975–76	60	31	28	1	358	319	63	3rd overall	
1976–77	60	41	18	1	375	267	83	2nd overall	
1977–78	60	28	32	0	309	308	56	5th overall	
1978–79	60	16	44	0	243	352	32	6th overall	
1979–80	60	49	9	2	392	214	100	1st overall	Won championship and Centennial Trophy
1980–81	60	32	28	0	278	250	64	3rd North	
1981–82	60	34	23	3	288	261	71	2nd South	
1982–83	60	35	22	3	317	261	73	1st South	
1983–84	60	34	25	1	300	266	69	1st South	Lost final
1984–85	60	39	20	1	275	222	79	1st South	Won championship
1985–86^{†}	-	-	-	-	-	-	-	---	
1986–87	60	31	28	1	302	306	63	2nd South	Won championship
1987–88	60	41	17	2	357	246	84	2nd South	
1988–89	60	39	18	3	285	202	81	1st South	Won championship

^{†}Team granted a one-year leave of absence in 1985–86. They would re-emerge in 1986-87 under new ownership.

=== Playoffs ===
- 1971 Won League, won Alta/BC Championship, won Abbott Cup, won 1971 Centennial Cup

Red Deer Rustlers defeated Mount Royal College 4-games-to-1
Red Deer Rustlers defeated Lethbridge Sugar Kings 4-games-to-1 AJHL CHAMPIONS
Red Deer Rustlers defeated Penticton Broncos (BCJHL) 4-games-to-3 ALTA/BC CHAMPIONS
Red Deer Rustlers defeated St. Boniface Saints (MJHL) 4-games-to-none ABBOTT CUP CHAMPIONS
Red Deer Rustlers defeated Charlottetown Islanders (MJAHL) 4-games-to-2 CENTENNIAL CUP CHAMPIONS

- 1972 Won League, won Alta/BC Championship, won Abbott Cup, lost 1972 Centennial Cup

Red Deer Rustlers defeated Lethbridge Sugar Kings 4-games-to-3
Red Deer Rustlers defeated Calgary Canucks 4-games-to-1 AJHL CHAMPIONS
Red Deer Rustlers defeated Vernon Essos (BCJHL) 4-games-to-2 ALTA/BC CHAMPIONS
Red Deer Rustlers defeated Humboldt Broncos (SJHL) 4-games-to-1 ABBOTT CUP CHAMPIONS
Guelph CMC's (SOJHL) defeated Red Deer Rustlers 4-games-to-none

- 1973 Lost final

Red Deer Rustlers defeated The Pass Red Devils 4-games-to-2
Calgary Canucks defeated Red Deer Rustlers 4-games-to-3

- 1974 Won League, lost Alta/BC Championship

Red Deer Rustlers defeated Edmonton Mets 4-games-to-none
Red Deer Rustlers defeated The Pass Red Devils 4-games-to-1 AJHL CHAMPIONS
Kelowna Buckaroos (BCJHL) defeated Red Deer Rustlers 4-games-to-1

- 1975 DNQ
- 1976 Lost semi-final

Spruce Grove Mets defeated Red Deer Rustlers 4-games-to-2

- 1977 Lost semi-final round robin

Red Deer Rustlers defeated Fort Saskatchewan Traders 4-games-to-2
Third in semi-final round robin (1-3) vs. Calgary Canucks and Taber Golden Suns

- 1978 Lost quarter-final

St. Albert Saints defeated Red Deer Rustlers 4-games-to-3

- 1979 Lost quarter-final

Calgary Canucks defeated Red Deer Rustlers 4-games-to-none

- 1980 Won League, won Alta/BC Championship, won Abbott Cup, won 1980 Centennial Cup

Red Deer Rustlers defeated Sherwood Park Crusaders 3-games-to-none
Red Deer Rustlers defeated St. Albert Saints 4-games-to-1
Red Deer Rustlers defeated Calgary Canucks 4-games-to-1 AJHL CHAMPIONS
Red Deer Rustlers defeated Penticton Knights (BCJHL) 4-games-to-none ALTA/BC CHAMPIONS
Red Deer Rustlers defeated Prince Albert Raiders (SJHL) 4-games-to-2 ABBOTT CUP CHAMPIONS
First in 1980 Centennial Cup round robin (3-1)
Red Deer Rustlers defeated North York Rangers (OPJHL) 3-2 in final CENTENNIAL CUP CHAMPIONS

- 1981 Lost quarter-final

St. Albert Saints defeated Red Deer Rustlers 3-games-to-1

- 1982 Lost semi-final

Red Deer Rustlers defeated Calgary Canucks 4-games-to-none
Calgary Spurs defeated Red Deer Rustlers 4-games-to-1

- 1983 Lost semi-final

Red Deer Rustlers defeated Olds Grizzlys 4-games-to-1
Calgary Canucks defeated Red Deer Rustlers 4-games-to-2

- 1984 Lost final

Red Deer Rustlers defeated Hobbema Hawks 4-games-to-1
Red Deer Rustlers defeated Calgary Spurs 4-games-to-1
Fort Saskatchewan Traders defeated Red Deer Rustlers 4-games-to-none

- 1985 Won League, lost Doyle Cup

Red Deer Rustlers defeated Olds Grizzlys 4-games-to-none
Red Deer Rustlers defeated Calgary Spurs 4-games-to-none
Red Deer Rustlers defeated Sherwood Park Crusaders 4-games-to-2 AJHL CHAMPIONS
Penticton Knights (BCJHL) defeated Red Deer Rustlers 4-games-to-1

- 1986 Did Not Participate
- 1987 Won League, lost Doyle Cup

Red Deer Rustlers defeated Calgary Spurs 4-games-to-3
Red Deer Rustlers defeated Calgary Canucks 4-games-to-3
Red Deer Rustlers defeated St. Albert Saints 4-games-to-2 AJHL CHAMPIONS
Richmond Sockeyes (BCJHL) defeated Red Deer Rustlers 4-games-to-3

- 1988 Lost semi-final

Red Deer Rustlers defeated Olds Grizzlys 4-games-to-2
Calgary Canucks defeated Red Deer Rustlers 4-games-to-none

- 1989 Won League, lost Doyle Cup

Red Deer Rustlers defeated Calgary Spurs 4-games-to-1
Red Deer Rustlers defeated Olds Grizzlys 4-games-to-1
Red Deer Rustlers defeated Fort Saskatchewan Traders 4-games-to-1 AJHL CHAMPIONS
Vernon Lakers (BCJHL) defeated Red Deer Rustlers 4-games-to-2

== NHL alumni ==
- Darrel Anholt
- Clayton Beddoes
- Rod Buskas
- Phil Crowe
- Glenn Johannesen
- Kelly Kisio
- Darryl Maggs
- Randy Moller
- Brian Ogilvie
- Ray Podloski
- Ron Shudra
- Brent Sutter
- Brian Sutter
- Darryl Sutter
- Duane Sutter
- Rich Sutter
- Ron Sutter
- Dixon Ward
- Blake Wesley
- Glen Wesley

== See also ==
- List of ice hockey teams in Alberta

Preceded by --	Centennial Cup Champions; 1971	Succeeded by Guelph CMC's
Preceded by Prince Albert Raiders	Centennial Cup Champions; 1980	Succeeded by Prince Albert Raiders
