= The Pass Red Devils =

- City: Crowsnest Pass, Alberta
- League: Alberta Junior Hockey League
- Operated: 1972–1976

Franchise history
- 1972–1976: The Pass Red Devils
- 1976–1978: Pincher Creek Panthers
- 1978–1979: Calgary Chinooks
- 1979–1990: Calgary Spurs
- 1990–2010: Calgary Royals
- 2010–2019: Calgary Mustangs
- 2021–: Blackfalds Bulldogs

The Pass Red Devils were a Junior A ice hockey team in the Alberta Junior Hockey League that played in the municipality of Crowsnest Pass, Alberta, from 1972 to 1976. The team relocated to nearby Pincher Creek for two years before settling in Calgary as the Calgary Spurs.

Their four-season tenure in Crowsnest Pass was mostly unsuccessful. The Red Devils never finished a season with more wins than losses and still hold the record for the worst full season in terms of wins and points in Alberta Junior Hockey League history with their 3–56–1 record in 1974–75, although the Calgary Cowboys and Drumheller Falcons recorded worse records before folding mid-season. Their 28-game losing streak that season is also still a league record as 2005.

Crowsnest Pass was later represented in the AJHL by the Crowsnest Pass Timberwolves from 1998 to 2004.

== Season-by-season records ==
Note: GP = Games played, W = Wins, L = Losses, T = Ties, Pts = Points, GF = Goals for, GA = Goals against

Season	GP	W	L	T	GF	GA	Pts	Finish	Playoffs
1972–73	60	27	33	0	254	308	54	4th Overall	Lost Semifinals, 2–4 vs. Red Deer Rustlers
1973–74	60	29	30	1	241	221	59	4th Overall	Won Semifinals, 4–1 vs. Calgary Canucks; Lost Finals, 1–4 vs. Red Deer Rustlers
1974–75	60	3	56	1	169	467	7	6th Overall	Did not qualify
1975–76	60	15	45	0	277	405	30	6th Overall	Did not qualify

== See also ==
- List of ice hockey teams in Alberta
