= 2026–27 AJHL season =

63rd year of the AJHL

- League: AJHL
- Sport: Junior ice hockey
- Duration: Preseason; August–September; Regular season September–March; Postseason; March–April
- Games: 324
- Teams: 12

AJHL seasons
- ← 2025–26 2027–28 →

The 2026–27 season is the 63rd year of the Alberta Junior Hockey League (AJHL).

Hockey Canada selected the Fort McMurray Oil Barons to host the 2027 Centennial Cup national championship tournament.

== Regular season ==
Teams play a 54-game regular season schedule, including six games against teams within the same division and four games against each team of the opposite division.

== Playoffs ==
The league adopted a new playoff format. Under the new format, the top 10 teams overall advance to the post-season, with the top 6 teams earning a bye in the first round. The first round is a best-of-five elimination series, with the 7th-place team against the 10th-place, and the 8th-place team against the 9th-place team. After the first round, the remaining 8 teams are reseeded. The winners of subsequent rounds are determined by a best-of-seven elimination series.

== Sources ==
- Collie, Doug (26 March 2026). "AJHL team will stay in Olds for 2026–27 season, hopefully beyond, says owner". St. Albert Gazette. Great West Media.
- "AJHL introduces new initiatives following 2026 AGM" (Press release). Alberta Junior Hockey League. 1 June 2026.
- Collie, Doug (21 June 2026). "Olds Grizzlys host AJHL annual general meeting". The Albertan. Great West Media.
- "AJHL announces league schedule for 63rd season" (Press release). Alberta Junior Hockey League. 23 June 2026.
- "Lloydminster Bobcats to host 2027 AJHL all-star game". Meridian Source. 8 October 2026.
- "Host communities announced for 2027 TELUS Cup and 2027 Centennial Cup". hockeycanada.ca. Hockey Canada. 30 July 2026.
- Umanah, Itoro (31 July 2026). "27 years later, Fort McMurray returns to national stage to host 2027 Centennial Cup". Edmonton Journal. Postmedia.
