= Brooks Bandits =

Junior ice hockey team

- City: Brooks, Alberta
- League: British Columbia Hockey League
- Conference: Interior
- Division: East
- Founded: 2000
- Home arena: Centennial Regional Arena
- Colours: Red, blue and white
- Head coach: Dakota Mason
- Website: brooksbandits.net

The Brooks Bandits are a Junior ice hockey team in the British Columbia Hockey League (BCHL) based in Brooks, Alberta. The teams plays its home games at the Centennial Regional Arena. The team was formerly in the Alberta Junior Hockey League (AJHL), until they joined the BCHL in February 2024.

== History ==
The Brooks Bandits were awarded an expansion franchise by the Alberta Junior Hockey League (AJHL) in 1999 and began play in the 2000–01 season. The franchise secured its expansion fee through what they call "The Founding Fathers", a group of 17 local businesses and individuals who donated the money needed to finance the team in exchange for lifetime benefits with the team.

The first coach for the Brooks Bandits was Nolan Crouse. The first franchise goal was scored by Chris Boyle just under a minute into the first regular season game against the Fort McMurray Oil Barons. The team struggled though most of its first four seasons, failing to make the playoffs. In 2004, the Crowsnest Pass Timberwolves took a leave of absence for one season, and their players were dispersed, adding Judd Blackwater and Neil to the Bandits team. Under head coach Kevin Higo and players such as Brendan Connolly, Spencer Machacek, Ben Wright, and Chad Johnson, the Bandits advanced to the AJHL playoffs for the first time.

In 2008, after three successful years, Higo accepted an assistant coaching position with the Moose Jaw Warriors in the major junior Western Hockey League. With the head coach and general manager positions vacant, the Bandits hired ECHL head coach and former NHL enforcer Brian Curran. Under Curran's leadership of a hard-hitting team, the Bandits finished in first place in the South Division before losing in the cross-over division playoff finals against the Grande Prairie Storm. On October 16, 2009, Curran was released by the Bandits and replaced by assistant Ryan Papaioannou. The Bandits finished fifth in the south division in 2009–10 and a second round playoff loss. During the season on January 20, 2010, the Bandits moved from the smaller Centennial Arena in the Lakeside Leisure Centre, to the brand new Centennial Regional Arena.

In Papaioannou's second 2010–11 season, the Bandits finished second in the division, but were eliminated in the second round by the Camrose Kodiaks in seven games. In the off-season on July 5, 2011, forward Nick Crosby was killed in a car accident returning home from a Bandits camp. After Crosby's death, the Bandits dedicated the 2011–12 season in his honour and retired his #23 jersey. The Bandits had statistically their best season to date with a record of 47–7–8. In the playoffs, they swept both the Calgary Canucks and the Olds Grizzlys in four games, advancing to their first league playoff championship series against the Fort McMurray Oil Barons. The Bandits won the series four games to two for their first league championship. In the Doyle Cup, the Bandits faced the British Columbia Hockey League (BCHL) champion Penticton Vees for the right to participate in the Junior A national championship tournament, the Royal Bank Cup. The Vees defeated the Bandits four games to one and went on to win the 2012 Royal Bank Cup Jr. A national championship.

The Bandits continued to dominate the AJHL at the start of the 2012–13 season going 20–0–0 before finally losing a game. The Bandits were one win short of tying the AJHL record for longest winning streak. The Bandits were led by captain Cam Maclise, Mark Reners, and Dakota Mason. The Bandits finished the regular season with a record of 53–4–3, breaking the AJHL record for wins in season, and points in a season (109). In all but one week (week 1), the Bandits were ranked as the number one team in Canada by the Canadian Junior Hockey League. In the playoffs, the Bandits defeated the Drumheller Dragons and Okotoks Oilers before winning a second straight AJHL championship over the Spruce Grove Saints. 2013 was the first year of the Western Canada Cup qualifying tournament to advance to the national championship and was held in Nanaimo, British Columbia. The Bandits finished first in the round-robin portion of the tournament, but lost to the Surrey Eagles 4–1 in the championship game. As the Western Canada Cup qualified two teams to the Royal Bank Cup, the Bandits played the Yorkton Terriers in the runner-up game the following day and won 1–0. They went 3–1 in the round-robin at the 2013 Royal Bank Cup and won their first Junior A national championship over the Summerside Western Capitals, becoming the first team to win the championship without either being the host or a regional champion.

They returned to the Western Canada Cup again in 2016 and 2017, winning the Western Junior A regional in 2017 and was the runner-up qualifier in 2016. They lost the 2017 Junior A national championship game in overtime to the Cobourg Cougars. The Western Canada Cup discontinued after the 2017 tournament and the AJHL qualified through the Doyle Cup again beginning in 2018. The Brooks Bandits were also selected as the host city for the 2019 National Junior A Championship. The Bandits then won the AJHL championship for a fifth time in 2019, but lost the Doyle Cup to the Prince George Spruce Kings in which both teams were also already qualified to advance to the national championship. Brooks then went undefeated in the championship tournament, winning the final game over the Spruce Kings 4–3, for their second Junior A national championship title. Brooks won the 2022 Centennial Cup in Estevan, SK by defeating the Pickering Panthers 4-1.

On January 20, 2024, the BCHL announced that five teams from the AJHL would join the BCHL in the 2024-25 season: the Blackfalds Bulldogs, Bandits, Okotoks Oilers, Sherwood Park Crusaders, and Spruce Grove Saints. In the interim, it was decided that the five Alberta-based teams would play out the rest of the 2023-24 season as a separate division under the aegis of the BCHL, and that there would be a year-end competition with the winner of the Alberta-based teams playing the winner of the BC-based teams.

On May 25th, 2025, the Bandits defeated the Chilliwack Chiefs in 6 games in the BCHL Playoffs to win their first ever Fred Page Cup in franchise history.

== Season-by-season record ==
Note: GP = Games played, W = Wins, L = Losses, T/OTL = Ties/Overtime losses, SOL = Shootout losses, Pts = Points, GF = Goals for, GA = Goals against

Season	GP	W	L	T/OTL	Pts	GF	GA	Finish	Playoffs
2000–01	64	18	41	5	41	257	373	7th South	did not qualify
2001–02	64	14	42	8	36	205	343	7th South	did not qualify
2002–03	64	12	45	7	31	167	280	7th South	did not qualify
2003–04	60	11	34	6	28	149	261	7th South	did not qualify
2004–05	64	36	26	2	74	230	199	2nd South	Won Quarterfinals, 4–3 vs. Calgary Canucks; Lost Semifinals, 0–4 vs. Camrose Kodiaks
2005–06	60	29	24	7	65	174	188	4th South	Won Preliminary series, 3–2 vs. Okotoks Oilers; Won Quarterfinals, 4–2 vs. Canmore Eagles; Lost Semifinals, 0–4 vs. Fort McMurray Oil Barons
2006–07	60	27	25	7	61	185	201	4th South	Won Preliminary series, 3–1 vs. Calgary Royals; Lost Quarterfinals, 2–4 vs. Okotoks Oilers
2007–08	62	23	30	9	55	197	228	6th South	Lost Preliminary series, 0–3 vs. Drumheller Dragons
2008–09	62	39	18	5	83	215	182	1st South	Won Div. Semifinals, 4–3 vs. Camrose Kodiaks; Lost Div. Finals, 1–4 vs. Grande Prairie Storm
2009–10	60	28	27	5	61	218	205	5th South	Won Div. Quarterfinals, 3–1 vs. Calgary Canucks; Lost Div. Semifinals, 1–4 vs. Camrose Kodiaks
2010–11	60	35	18	7	77	211	185	2nd South	Won Div. Quarterfinals, 3–0 vs. Canmore Eagles; Lost Div. Semifinals, 3–4 vs. Camrose Kodiaks
2011–12	60	47	7	6	100	273	131	1st South	Won Div. Semifinals, 4–0 vs. Calgary Canucks; Won Div. Finals, 4–0 vs. Olds Grizzlys; Won AJHL Championship, 4–2 vs. Fort McMurray Oil Barons; Lost Doyle Cup, 1–4 vs. Penticton Vees (BCHL)
2012–13	60	53	4	3	109	289	113	1st South	Won Div. Semifinals, 4–1 vs. Drumheller Dragons; Won Div. Finals, 4–3 vs. Okotoks Oilers; Won AJHL Championship, 4–1 vs. Spruce Grove Saints; Advanced to Royal Bank Cup as Western Canada Cup runner-up Won 2013 Royal Bank Cup Junior A National Championship
2013–14	60	39	13	8	86	196	132	1st South	Won Div. Semifinals, 4–0 vs. Olds Grizzlys; Lost Div. Finals, 0–4 vs. Drumheller Dragons
2014–15	60	43	13	4	90	234	163	2nd South	Won Div. Quarterfinals, 3–0 vs. Calgary Mustangs; Won Div. Semifinals, 4–0 vs. Okotoks Oilers; Won Div. Finals, 4–3 vs. Camrose Kodiaks; Lost AJHL Finals, 1–4 vs. Spruce Grove Saints
2015–16	60	49	9	2	100	306	135	1st of 8, South; 2nd of 16, AJHL	Won Div. Semifinals, 4–0 vs. Canmore Eagles; Won Div. Finals, 4–0 vs. Camrose Kodiaks; Won AJHL Championship, 4–1 vs. Spruce Grove Saints; Advanced to 2016 Royal Bank Cup as Western Canada Cup runner-up
2016–17	60	51	5	4	106	294	107	1st of 8, South; 1st of 16, AJHL	Won Div. Semifinals, 4–0 vs. Olds Grizzlys; Won Div. Finals, 4–1 vs. Okotoks Oilers; Won AJHL Championship, 4–0 vs. Whitecourt Wolverines; Advanced to Royal Bank Cup as Western Canada Cup champions
2017–18	60	45	14	1	91	255	131	2nd of 8, South; 3rd of 16, AJHL	Won Div. Quarterfinals, 3–0 vs. Canmore Eagles; Won Div. Semifinals, 4–2 vs. Drumheller Dragons; Lost Div. Finals, 2–4 vs. Okotoks Oilers
2018–19	60	57	3	0	114	334	125	1st of 8, South; 1st of 16, AJHL	Won Div. Semifinals, 4–1 Canmore Eagles; Won Div. Finals, 4–2 Okotoks Oilers; Won AJHL Championship, 4–0 Spruce Grove Saints; Lost Doyle Cup, 2–4 Prince George Spruce Kings (BCHL); Won 2019 National Junior A Championship
2019–20	58	46	10	2	94	290	145	2nd of 7, South; 3rd of 15, AJHL	Postseason cancelled
2020–21	20	18	2	0	36	111	44	Remainder of season cancelled due to Covid.	
2021–22	60	52	6	2	106	371	130	1st of 8, South; 1st of 16, AJHL	Won Div. Semifinals, 4–0 Canmore Eagles; Won Div. Finals, 4–0 Okotoks Oilers; Won AJHL Championship, 4–1 Spruce Grove Saints; Advance to National Junior A Championship
2022–23	60	53	5	2	108	319	113	1st of 8, South; 1st of 16, AJHL	Won Div. Semifinals, 4–2 Okotoks Oilers; Won Div. Finals, 4–0 Blackfalds Bulldogs; Won AJHL Championship, 4–1 Spruce Grove Saints; Advance to National Junior A Championship
Move to Indepentdent British Columbia Hockey League
2023-24	65	58	6	1	117	144	60	1st of 5, AB Div.	Won Div. Semifinals, 4–3 Okotoks Oilers; Won Div. Finals, 4–1 Sherwood Park Crusaders; Won 2–0 Surrey Eagles; BCHL Rocky Mountain Challenge
2024-25	54	40	10	4	84	234	123	2nd of 11, Interior; 2nd of 21, BCHL	Won Conf. Quarters, 4-1 West Kelowna Warriors; Won Conf. Semifinals, 4–0 Sherwood Park Crusaders; Won Conf. Finals, 4–2 Penticton Vees; BCHL Fred Page Champions 4-2 Chilliwack Chiefs
2025-26	54	37	17	6	80	253	175	2nd of 11, Interior; 2nd of 20, BCHL	Won Conf. Quarters, 4-0 Spruce Grove Saints; Won Conf. Semifinals, 4–3 Sherwood Park Crusaders; BCHL Rogers Cup Champions 4-1 Nanaimo Clippers

=== Western Canada Cup ===
The Western Canada Cup was a postseason tournament between the playoff champions of the Alberta Junior Hockey League (AJHL), British Columbia Hockey League (BCHL), Manitoba Junior Hockey League (MJHL), Saskatchewan Junior Hockey League (SJHL), and a previously selected host team from one of the leagues. It ran from 2013 to 2017 with the top two teams qualifying for the Royal Bank Cup Junior A national championship tournament. It replaced the Doyle Cup, which had been the qualifier for the AJHL and BCHL champions, and the ANAVET Cup, which had been the qualifier for the MJHL and SJHL champions. The qualifying system reverted the Doyle and ANAVET Cups in 2018.

The tournament began with round-robin play between the five team followed by the top two teams playing in championship game and the third and fourth place teams playing in a semifinal game. The loser of the championship game then faced the winner of the semifinal game for the runner-up qualifier. The winner of the championship and the runner-up game advanced to the Royal Bank Cup.

Year	Round-robin	Record	Standing	Semifinal	Championship game	Runner-up game
2013	W, 4–2 vs. Surrey Eagles (BCHL); L, 2–7 vs. Nanaimo Clippers (Host); OTW, 2–1 vs. Yorkton Terriers (SJHL); W, 3–0 vs. Steinbach Pistons (MJHL)	3–1–0 (W–L–OTL)	1st of 5	—	L, 1–4 vs. Surrey Eagles	W, 1–0 vs. Yorkton Terriers; Western Canada Cup Runner-up
2016	W, 4–2 vs. West Kelowna Warriors (BCHL); W, 3–0 vs. Melfort Mustangs (SJHL); W, 9–3 vs. Portage Terriers (MJHL); W, 6–4 vs. Estevan Bruins (Host)	4–0–0–0 (W–OTW–L–OTL)	1st of 5	—	L, 0–6 vs. West Kelowna Warriors	W, 2–1 vs. Portage Terriers; Western Canada Cup Runner-up
2017	W, 5–2 vs. Chilliwack Chiefs (BCHL); SOW, 2–1 vs. Penticton Vees (Host); W, 4–1 vs. Battlefords North Stars (SJHL); W, 5–0 vs. Portage Terriers (MJHL)	3–1–0–0 (W–OTW–L–OTL)	1st of 5	—	W, 6–1 vs. Chilliwack Chiefs; Western Canada Cup Champion	—

=== Junior A National Championship ===
The National Junior A Championship, known as the Centennial Cup and formerly as the Royal Bank Cup or RBC Cup, is the postseason tournament for the Canadian national championship for Junior A hockey teams that are members of the Canadian Junior Hockey League. The tournament consists of the regional Junior A champions and a previously selected host team. Since 1990, the national championship has used a five-team tournament format when the regional qualifiers were designated as the ANAVET Cup (Western), Doyle Cup (Pacific), Dudley Hewitt Cup (Central), and Fred Page Cup (Eastern). From 2013 to 2017, the qualifiers were the Dudley Hewitt Cup (Central), Fred Page Cup (Eastern), and the Western Canada Cup champions and runners-up (Western #1 and #2).

The tournament begins with round-robin play between the five teams followed by the top four teams playing a semifinal game, with the top seed facing the fourth seed and the second facing the third. The winners of the semifinals then face each other in final game for the national championship. In some years, the losers of the semifinal games face each other for a third place game.

Year	Round-robin	Record	Standing	Semifinal	Championship game
2013	W, 7–1 vs. Truro Bearcats (Eastern); W, 6–3 vs. Minnesota Wilderness (Central); L, 1–3 vs. Summerside Western Capitals (Host); W, 5–2 vs. Surrey Eagles (Western #1)	3–0–0–1 (W–OTW–OTL–L)	1st of 5	OTW, 5–4 vs. Minnesota Wilderness	W, 3–1 vs. Summerside Western Capitals; National Junior A Champions
2016	L, 2–3 vs. Trenton Golden Hawks (Central); W, 5–1 vs. West Kelowna Warriors (Western #1); W, 4–3 vs. Lloydminster Bobcats (Host); W, 5–4 vs. Carleton Place Canadians (Eastern)	3–0–0–1 (W–OTW–OTL–L)	2nd of 5	L, 1–4 vs. West Kelowna Warriors	—
2017	W, 6–3 vs. Terrebonne Cobras (Eastern); OTW, 2–1 vs. Penticton Vees (Western #2); W, 8–0 vs. Trenton Golden Hawks (Central); L, 2–5 vs. Cobourg Cougars (Host)	2–1–0–1 (W–OTW–OTL–L)	2nd of 5	W, 4–0 vs. Terrebonne Cobras	OTL, 2–3 vs. Cobourg Cougars
2019; Host	W, 7–3 vs. Oakville Blades (Central); W, 5–3 vs. Portage Terriers (Western); W, 2–1 vs. Ottawa Jr. Senators (Eastern); W, 3–1 vs. Prince George Spruce Kings (Pacific)	4–0–0–0 (W–OTW–OTL–L)	1st of 5	W, 4–3 vs. Ottawa Jr. Senators	W, 4–3 vs. Prince George Spruce Kings; National Junior A Champions

== Centennial Cup ==
Canadian Jr. A National Championships
Maritime Junior Hockey League, Quebec Junior Hockey League, Central Canada Hockey League, Ontario Junior Hockey League, Northern Ontario Junior Hockey League, Superior International Junior Hockey League, Manitoba Junior Hockey League, Saskatchewan Junior Hockey League, Alberta Junior Hockey League, and Host. The BCHL declared itself an independent league and there is no BC representative.
Round-robin play in two 5-team pools with top three in pool advancing to determine a Champion.

Year	Round-robin	Record	Standing	Quarterfinal	Semifinal	Championship
2022	W, Longueuil College Francais (QJHL),5-2; W, Red Lake Miners (SIJHL), 11-1; W, Pickering Panthers (OJHL), 9-1; W, Estevan Bruins (Host), 4-0	4-0-0-0	1st of 5 Group A	earned bye	Won - 11-2; Longueuil College Francais	Won -4-1; Pickering Panthers; National champions
2023	W, Yarmouth Mariners (MarJHL),7-2; W, Ottawa Jr. Senators (CCHL), 5-1; W, Timmins Rock (NOJHL), 9-0; W, Terrebonne Cobras (QJHL), 6-1	4-0-0-0	1st of 5 Group A	earned bye	Won - 3-0; Ottawa Jr. Senators	Won -4-0; Battlefords North Stars; National champions

== Notable alumni ==
The following alumni have gone on in their career to play in the National Hockey League or similar achievements in international hockey.

- Curtis Glencross
- Chad Johnson
- Spencer Machacek
- Cale Makar
- Ty Rattie
- Jeff Malott
- Brandon Scanlin
- Parker Foo

== Office Staff ==
Nathan Crosby - Business Manager/Play by Play (Drumheller Dragons 2013-2017; Brooks Bandits 2017-Present)

Terri-Lea Yeaman - Office Manager (Brooks Bandits 2010-Present)

Ryan Reed - Media Services Manager (Edmonton Oilers 2023-2025; Brooks Bandits 2025-Present)

== See also ==
- List of ice hockey teams in Alberta

Preceded by Penticton Vees	Royal Bank Cup Champions; 2013	Succeeded by Yorkton Terriers
Preceded by Chilliwack Chiefs	National Junior A Championship/Centennial Cup; 2019, 2022, 2023	Succeeded by Collingwood Blues
