= Okotoks Oilers =

Junior ice hockey team

- City: Okotoks, Alberta
- League: BCHL
- Conference: Interior
- Division: East
- Founded: 1998
- Home arena: Viking Rentals Centre
- Colours: Green, gold, black, and white
- General manager: Tyler Deis
- Head coach: Tyler Deis
- Website: okotoksoilers.com

Franchise history
- 1998–2004: Crowsnest Pass Timberwolves
- 2005–present: Okotoks Oilers

The Okotoks Oilers are a junior A ice hockey team in the BCHL based in Okotoks, Alberta. The team plays its home games at the Viking Rentals Centre. The team joined the BCHL on February 1, 2024, after defecting from the AJHL along with four other Alberta-based teams.

== History ==
In June 2004, the AJHL board of governors approved the sale and relocation of the Crowsnest Pass Timberwolves franchise to Okotoks. The franchise was granted a one-year leave of absence in 2004–05 to prepare for its first season in its new home. Players from the 2003–04 Timberwolves team were loaned out to other AJHL and BCHL teams. Though dormant, the Oilers franchise was awarded the 2004–05 AJHL all-star game, which acted as a preview of the AJHL brand for the citizens of Okotoks.

The 2005–06 season was a success for the Oilers, as they finished with a record above .500 before losing to the Brooks Bandits in the first round of the playoffs, three games to two. The Oilers played their first season in Murray Arena while construction of their new facility was ongoing.

On January 20, 2024, it was announced that the team, along with four other AJHL teams, would join the BCHL in the 2024–2025 season. The AJHL responded to the announcement by cancelling most of the five teams' remaining scheduled matches except those between each other.

It was then decided that the five Alberta-based teams would play out the rest of the 2023–24 season as a separate division under the aegis of the BCHL. For the post-season, the Okotoks Oilers and Spruce Grove Saints, respectively the 4th and 5th placed teams in the Alberta division, played a best-of-5 wildcard series, with the winner advancing to the Alberta division semi-finals along with the top-3 Alberta teams. The rankings for the Alberta division were determined by winning percentage including their regular season records from the AJHL. The semi-final and final rounds each consisted of a best-of-7 series. The Okotoks Oilers lost to the Brooks Bandits, 4–0, in the semi-final round. Beginning in the 2024–25 BCHL season, the five Alberta-based teams, along with the Cranbrook Bucks, formed the East division of the Interior conference.

== Season-by-season record ==
=== Alberta Junior Hockey League ===
Okotoks Oilers
Season	GP	W	L	T/OTL	Pts	GF	GA	Finish	Playoffs
2005–06	60	27	24	9	63	193	202	5th of 8, South; 11th of 16, AJHL	Lost preliminary, 2–3 (Bandits)
2006–07	60	33	25	2	68	219	187	2nd of 8, South; 5th of 16, AJHL	Won preliminary, 3–2 (Dragons); Won quarterfinals, 4–2 (Bandits); Lost semi-finals, 1–4 (Traders)
2007–08	62	45	11	6	96	247	168	2nd of 7, South; 2nd of 14, AJHL	Won preliminary, 3–1 (Canucks); Lost Quarterfinals, 1–4 (Dragons)
2008–09	62	39	19	4	82	257	187	1st of 8, South; 4th of 16, AJHL	Won Div. Quarterfinals, 3–0 vs. Eagles; Lost Div. Semifinals, 2–4 (Grizzlys)
2009–10	60	38	18	4	80	249	187	1st of 8, South; 3rd of 16, AJHL	Won Div. Semifinals, 4–2 vs. Eagles; Lost Div. Finals, 1–4 (Kodiaks)
2010–11	60	43	12	5	91	254	164	1st of 8, South; 2nd of 16, AJHL	Won Div. Semifinals, 4–0 (Mustangs); Lost Div. Finals, 3–4 (Kodiaks)
2011–12	60	34	21	5	73	210	177	2nd of 8, South; 7th of 16, AJHL	Won Div. Quarterfinals, 3–0 (Dragons); Lost Div. Semifinals, 2–4 (Olds Grizzlys)
2012–13	60	38	18	4	80	194	153	2nd of 8, South; 2nd of 16, AJHL	Won Div. Quarterfinals, 3–2 (Grizzlys); Won Div. Semifinals, 4–0 (Kodiaks); Lost Div. Finals, 3–4 (Bandits)
2013–14	60	36	19	5	77	189	152	2nd of 8, South; 4th of 16, AJHL	Lost Div. Quarterfinals, 2–3 (Grizzlys)
2014–15	60	38	16	6	82	183	156	3rd of 8, South; 4th of 16, AJHL	Won Div. Quarterfinals, 3–0 (Canmore Eagles); Lost Div. Semifinals, 0–4 Bandits)
2015–16	60	32	25	3	67	197	177	3rd of 8, South; 8th of 16, AJHL	Won Div. Quarterfinals, 3–0 (Canucks); Lost Div. Semifinals, 1–4 (Kodiaks)
2016–17	60	36	18	6	78	193	162	4th of 8, South; 8th of 16, AJHL	Won Div. Quarterfinals, 3–0 (Kodiks); Won Div. Semifinals, 4–0 (Canucks); Lost Div. Finals, 1–4 (Bandits
2017–18	60	52	6	2	106	270	132	1st of 8, South; 1st of 16, AJHL	Won Div. Semifinals, 4–0 (Kodiaks); Won Div. Finals, 4–2 (Bandits); Lost AJHL Finals, 1–4 (Saints)
2018–19	60	39	19	2	80	251	160	2nd of 8, South; 5th of 16, AJHL	Won Div. Quarterfinals, 3–0 (Canucks); Won Div. Semifinals, 4–1 (Kodiaks); Lost Div. Finals, 2–4 (Bandits)
2019–20	58	47	7	4	98	256	141	1st of 7, South; 2nd of 15, AJHL	Post-season cancelled
2020–21	8	7	1	0	14	31	14	2nd of 7, South; 8th of 15, AJHL	Post-season cancelled
2021–22	60	28	28	4	60	195	193	4th of 8, South; 9th of 16, AJHL	Won Div. Quarterfinals, 4–0 (Bulldogs); Won Div. Semifinals, 4–2 (Dragons); Lost Div. Finals, 0–4 (Bandits)
2022–23	60	34	23	3	71	215	184	4th of 8, South; 8th of 16, AJHL	Won Div. Quarterfinals, 4–0 (Kodiaks); Lost Div. Semifinals, 2-4 (Bandits)
2023–24	49	33	14	1	68	218	144	Did not finish	Did not participate

Source: "Okotoks Oilers hockey team [AJHL] statistics and history". hockeydb.com.

=== British Columbia Hockey League ===
Okotoks Oilers
Season	GP	W	L	T	OTL	SOL	GF	GA	Pts	Finish	Playoffs
2023–24	69	38	28	0	3	0	108	113	79	4th of 5, Alberta	Won wildcard, 3-0 (Saints); Lost semi-finals, 4-3 (Bandits)
2024–25	54	21	30	0	3	0	158	211	45	8th of 11, Interior; 17th of 21 BCHL	Lost Div Semifinals, 4-0 (Vees)
2025–26	54	20	31	0	2	1	161	235	43	5th of 5, Interior East; 9th of 10, Interior; 17th of 20 BCHL	Did not qualify

Source: "Okotoks Oilers hockey team [BCHL] statistics and history". hockeydb.com.

== See also ==
- List of ice hockey teams in Alberta

== Additional reading ==
- Greer, Remy (17 September 2024). "Okotoks Oilers optimistic ahead of first full season in BCHL". Western Wheel. Great West Media.
- "B.C. Hockey League releases schedule for 2024-25 season". Global News. Corus Entertainment. 20 June 2024.
- Dheensaw, Cleve (14 June 2024). "BCHL unveils new divisional format for 2024-25 season". Times Colonist. Glacier Media Group.
- "2024 BCHL Annual General Meeting Recap". bchl.ca. British Columbia Hockey League.
- O'Nyons, Harrison (4 May 2023). "Okotoks Oilers to host the 2025 Centennial Cup". High River Online.
