= Pincher Creek Panthers =

- City: Pincher Creek, Alberta
- League: Alberta Junior Hockey League
- Operated: 1976–1978

Franchise history
- 1972–1976: The Pass Red Devils
- 1976–1978: Pincher Creek Panthers
- 1978–1979: Calgary Chinooks
- 1979–1990: Calgary Spurs
- 1990–201: Calgary Royals
- 2010–2019: Calgary Mustangs
- 2021–: Blackfalds Bulldogs

The Pincher Creek Panthers were a Junior A ice hockey team in the Alberta Junior Hockey League from Pincher Creek, Alberta. Founded in 1972 as The Pass Red Devils, the team relocated to Pincher Creek for the 1976–77 season. The Panthers lasted two years before relocating again to Calgary to become the Calgary Chinooks. After renaming to the Calgary Spurs in 1979 and then the Calgary Royals in 1990, the franchise became the Calgary Mustangs franchise in 2010.

== Season-by-season record ==
Note: GP = Games played, W = Wins, L = Losses, T = Ties, Pts = Points, GF = Goals for, GA = Goals against

Season	GP	W	L	T	GF	GA	Pts	Finish	Playoffs
1976–77	60	12	47	1	237	384	25	6th Overall	Lost Quarterfinals, 1–4 vs. Calgary Canucks
1977–78	60	18	40	2	235	346	38	6th Overall	Lost Quarterfinals, 2–4 vs. Calgary Canucks

== See also ==
- List of ice hockey teams in Alberta
