= Alberta Junior Hockey League =

Ice hockey league in Alberta, Canada

- Current season, competition or edition: 2026–27 AJHL season
- Classification: Junior A
- Sport: Ice hockey
- Founded: 1964
- Commissioner: Ryan Bartoshyk
- No. of teams: 12
- Country: Canada
- Region: Alberta; Saskatchewan
- Most recent champion: Canmore Eagles (1)
- Most titles: Calgary Canucks (10)
- Website: ajhl.ca

The Alberta Junior Hockey League (AJHL) is an Alberta-based Junior A ice hockey league that belongs to the Canadian Junior Hockey League (CJHL). It was formed as a five-team league in 1964. The 2023–24 season began with 16 teams; however, 5 teams did not finish the season after it was announced that they planned to join the BCHL in the 2024–25 season. The regular season league champions receive the Dave Duchak Trophy. The playoff champions receive the Inter Pipeline Cup (previously known as the Carling O'Keefe trophy and Gas Drive Cup). The winner of the AJHL playoffs continues on to play in the Centennial Cup tournament, which determines Canadian Junior A champion.

== History ==
The early 1960s saw a much different junior hockey scene in Alberta than what currently exists. The Edmonton Oil Kings were the only true Junior-A-calibre team in the province and drew most of the top talent Alberta had to offer. The Oil Kings were the Western Canadian champions from 1962 until 1966, Abbott Cup champions in 1954 and from 1960 to 1966, and Memorial Cup national champions in 1963 and 1966. In 1966, the Oil Kings helped create the Western Hockey League. The issue in 1964 was that there were hundreds of junior-calibre players in the province, but really only one team to play for. A group of business and hockey people got together in 1964 and decided to form a Junior "A" league in an attempt to truly develop Alberta hockey. The original league consisted of the Edmonton Safeway Canadians, the Edmonton Maple Leafs, the Lethbridge Sugar Kings, Calgary Cowboys, and the Calgary Buffaloes.

The Edmonton Safeway Canadians and Maple Leafs later merged in 1971 to become the Edmonton Mets, then moved to Spruce Grove to become the Spruce Grove Mets in 1974. They lasted only three seasons in Spruce Grove; however, they won the AJHL title twice, and the Manitoba Centennial Trophy in 1975. In 1976, they moved again to become the St. Albert Saints, where they won three more league titles. In 2004, the team returned to Spruce Grove as the Spruce Grove Saints. This well-travelled franchise has sent over 30 players into the National Hockey League (NHL), including Hockey Hall of Famer Mark Messier.

One of the AJHL's most famous franchises, the Red Deer Rustlers, joined the league in 1967, capturing the championship in their first season. The Rustlers had attempted to join the Western Canada Junior Hockey League, but were blocked by the Alberta Amateur Hockey Association, and instead placed in the AJHL. In 1971, the Rustlers captured the first Manitoba Centennial Trophy as national Junior A champions. The Rustlers, who featured all six Sutter brothers who would go on to the NHL, won eight AJHL titles and two Centennial Trophies during their existence. They were expelled from the league, however, in 1989, and formally folded in 1992 when the Red Deer Rebels joined the WHL.

In 1971, the Calgary Canucks were founded following the demise of the Cowboys and Buffaloes. Today, the Canucks are the oldest franchise still operating in the AJHL. It was founded with a mandate to focus on giving Calgary-area kids a place to play while focusing on their educational needs. The Canucks have captured a league record ten AJHL championships and won the Centennial Cup in 1995, the Canadian Championship of Junior A hockey, now known as the Royal Bank Cup.

After a game on February 21, 1980, the AJHL was shaken by a tragedy. Twenty-year-old Trevor Elton, Captain of the Sherwood Park Crusaders was hit cleanly along the boards by a player on the St. Albert Saints in St. Albert. Elton landed and went into convulsions and died later that night while in hospital.

On November 26, 2010, the Fort McMurray Oil Barons and Drayton Valley Thunder played the first modern-era regulation outdoor junior hockey game, at MacDonald Island in Fort McMurray. The game was known as the "Northern Classic". The 5,000 tickets available for the game sold out in less than an hour, and consequently broke the league attendance record of 4,400. A new attendance record was set in 2017 as 5,989 fans watched the Okotoks Oilers and Spruce Grove Saints play the last game at Northlands Coliseum.

On May 2, 2012, the AJHL approved a request from the St. Albert Steel to relocate the team from St. Albert to Whitecourt to become the Whitecourt Wolverines.

On January 20, 2024, the British Columbia Hockey League (BCHL) announced that the Blackfalds Bulldogs, Brooks Bandits, Okotoks Oilers, Sherwood Park Crusaders, and Spruce Grove Saints would join the BCHL in the 2024–25 season. Following the announcement, the teams' remaining AJHL games for the 2023–24 season were cancelled, and nearly all trace of the five departing teams, including statistics for the current and previous seasons, had been removed from the AJHL website.

== Current teams ==
The AJHL features 12 teams operating in two provinces: 11 located in Alberta, and the Lloydminster Bobcats located in Lloydminster, Saskatchewan. The divisions are organized based on each team's proximity to Northern and Southern Alberta, being the North Division and the South Division respecetively.

An official statement from the AJHL said that it had received expressions of interest from "various partners and stakeholders" about joining the league. In April 2024, the league announced that the Devon Xtreme would join the North Division as an expansion team in the 2024–25 season.

Map of AJHL teams
⬤ North division
⬤ South division

Division	Team	Home	Arena
North	Bonnyville Pontiacs	Bonnyville	R. J. Lalonde Arena
North	Devon Xtreme	Devon	Dale Fisher Arena
North	Fort McMurray Oil Barons	Fort McMurray	Centerfire Place
North	Grande Prairie Storm	Grande Prairie	Bonnetts Energy Centre
North	Lloydminster Bobcats	Lloydminster	Cenovus Energy Hub
North	Whitecourt Wolverines	Whitecourt	JDA Place
South	Calgary Canucks	Calgary	Ken Bracko Arena
South	Camrose Kodiaks	Camrose	EnCana Arena
South	Canmore Eagles	Canmore	Canmore Recreation Centre
South	Drayton Valley Thunder	Drayton Valley	Omniplex
South	Drumheller Dragons	Drumheller	Drumheller Memorial Arena
South	Olds Grizzlys	Olds	Olds & District Sports Complex

== Timeline of teams in the AJHL ==
- 1964 – Alberta Junior Hockey League is founded with: Edmonton Safeway Canadians, Edmonton Maple Leafs, Lethbridge Sugar Kings, Calgary Cowboys and Calgary Buffaloes.
- 1965 – Edmonton Canadians renamed Edmonton Western Movers
- 1967 – Red Deer Rustlers join league
- 1971 – Calgary Canucks join league
- 1972 – The Pass Red Devils join league
- 1972 – Edmonton Maple Leafs and Edmonton Western Movers merge, renamed Edmonton Mets
- 1974 – Edmonton Mets relocate to Spruce Grove and become the Spruce Grove Mets
- 1974 – Taber Golden Suns join league
- 1976 – Edmonton Crusaders join league
- 1976 – Fort Saskatchewan Traders join league
- 1976 – The Pass Red Devils relocate to Pincher Creek and become the Pincher Creek Panthers
- 1977 – Spruce Grove Mets relocate to St. Albert and become the St. Albert Saints
- 1978 – Edmonton Crusaders relocate to Sherwood Park and become the Sherwood Park Crusaders
- 1978 – Pincher Creek Panthers relocate to Calgary and become the Calgary Chinooks
- 1979 – Calgary Chinooks become the Calgary Spurs
- 1981 – Fort McMurray Oil Barons and Hobbema Hawks join league
- 1981 – Taber Golden Suns relocate to Olds and become the Olds Grizzlys
- 1988 – Lloydminster Lancers of the Saskatchewan Junior Hockey League join league as Lloydminster Blazers
- 1989 – Red Deer Rustlers expelled from league after bi-law violations
- 1990 – Calgary Spurs become the Calgary Royals
- 1990 – Hobbema Hawks take leave of absence
- 1991 – Bonnyville Pontiacs join league
- 1993 – Hobbema Hawks cease operations
- 1995 – Bow Valley Eagles join league
- 1996 – Grande Prairie Storm join league from the Rocky Mountain Junior Hockey League
- 1997 – Camrose Kodiaks join league
- 1998 – Drayton Valley Thunder join league
- 1998 – Crowsnest Pass Timberwolves join league
- 2000 – Brooks Bandits join league
- 2001 – Bow Valley Eagles become Canmore Eagles
- 2003 – Drumheller Dragons join league
- 2004 – St. Albert Saints return to Spruce Grove and become the Spruce Grove Saints
- 2005 – Lloydminster Blazers become Lloydminster Bobcats
- 2005 – Crowsnest Pass Timberwolves relocate to Okotoks and become the Okotoks Oilers
- 2007 – Fort Saskatchewan Traders relocate to St. Albert and become the St. Albert Steel
- 2010 – Calgary Royals become the Calgary Mustangs
- 2012 – St. Albert Steel relocate to Whitecourt and become the Whitecourt Wolverines
- 2019 – Calgary Mustangs go on hiatus
- 2021 – Calgary Mustangs relocate to Blackfalds and become the Blackfalds Bulldogs
- 2024 – Blackfalds Bulldogs, Brooks Bandits, Okotoks Oilers, Sherwood Park Crusaders, and Spruce Grove Saints switch to the BCHL.
- 2024 – Devon Xtreme join as an expansion team

== League championships ==
The AJHL playoff championship cup was originally known as Carling O'Keefe Cup before it began going by several other sponsored names:

- Carling O'Keefe Cup was presented 1965–1997
- Rogers Wireless Cup presented 1998–2007
- Enerflex Cup presented 2008–2012
- Gas Drive Cup presented 2013–2017
- Inter Pipeline Cup presented 2018–present

The winners of the AJHL playoffs then advance to the Centennial Cup tournament, which determines the Canadian Junior A champions. Historically, from 1971 to 2012 and from 2018 to 2019, the AJHL champ played for the Doyle Cup against the champion of the British Columbia Hockey League. The winner of the Doyle Cup then advanced to the national championship tournament. From 2013 to 2017, instead of the Doyle Cup, the AJHL playoff winner participated in the Western Canada Cup.

League champions by year
Year	League champions	Runners up
2026	Canmore Eagles	Whitecourt Wolverines
2025	Calgary Canucks	Grande Prairie Storm
2024	Calgary Canucks	Whitecourt Wolverines
2023	Brooks Bandits	Spruce Grove Saints
2022	Brooks Bandits	Spruce Grove Saints
2021	Not awarded (Note: 2020 & 2021 playoffs cancelled due to public health restrictions)	
2020	Not awarded	
2019	Brooks Bandits	Spruce Grove Saints
2018	Spruce Grove Saints	Okotoks Oilers
2017	Brooks Bandits	Whitecourt Wolverines
2016	Brooks Bandits	Spruce Grove Saints
2015	Spruce Grove Saints	Brooks Bandits
2014	Spruce Grove Saints	Drumheller Dragons
2013	Brooks Bandits	Spruce Grove Saints
2012	Brooks Bandits	Fort McMurray Oil Barons
2011	Spruce Grove Saints	Camrose Kodiaks
2010	Spruce Grove Saints	Fort McMurray Oil Barons
2009	Grande Prairie Storm	Spruce Grove Saints
2008	Camrose Kodiaks	Fort McMurray Oil Barons
2007	Camrose Kodiaks	Fort Saskatchewan Traders
2006	Fort McMurray Oil Barons	Camrose Kodiaks
2005	Camrose Kodiaks	Fort McMurray Oil Barons
2004	Grande Prairie Storm	Fort McMurray Oil Barons
2003	Camrose Kodiaks	St. Albert Saints
2002	Drayton Valley Thunder	Grande Prairie Storm
2001	Camrose Kodiaks	Drayton Valley Thunder
2000	Fort McMurray Oil Barons	Camrose Kodiaks
1999	Calgary Canucks	St. Albert Saints
1998	St. Albert Saints	Fort Saskatchewan Traders
1997	Fort McMurray Oil Barons	Calgary Canucks
1996	St. Albert Saints	Fort McMurray Oil Barons
1995	Calgary Canucks	Olds Grizzlys
1994	Olds Grizzlys	Fort McMurray Oil Barons
1993	Olds Grizzlys	Fort Saskatchewan Traders
1992	Olds Grizzlys	Fort McMurray Oil Barons
1991	Calgary Royals	Fort Saskatchewan Traders
1990	Calgary Canucks	Sherwood Park Crusaders
1989	Red Deer Rustlers	Fort Saskatchewan Traders
1988	Calgary Canucks	St. Albert Saints
1987	Red Deer Rustlers	St. Albert Saints
1986	Calgary Canucks	Sherwood Park Crusaders
1985	Red Deer Rustlers	Sherwood Park Crusaders
1984	Fort Saskatchewan Traders	Red Deer Rustlers
1983	Calgary Canucks	Fort McMurray Oil Barons
1982	St. Albert Saints	Calgary Spurs
1981	St. Albert Saints	Taber Golden Suns
1980	Red Deer Rustlers	Calgary Canucks
1979	Fort Saskatchewan Traders	Calgary Canucks
1978	Calgary Canucks	Fort Saskatchewan Traders
1977	Calgary Canucks	Taber Golden Suns
1976	Spruce Grove Mets	Taber Golden Suns
1975	Spruce Grove Mets	Drumheller Falcons
1974	Red Deer Rustlers	The Pass Red Devils
1973	Calgary Canucks	Red Deer Rustlers
1972	Red Deer Rustlers	Calgary Canucks
1971	Red Deer Rustlers	Lethbridge Sugar Kings
1970	Red Deer Rustlers	
1969	Lethbridge Sugar Kings	
1968	Edmonton Western Movers	
1967	Edmonton Western Movers	Lethbridge Sugar Kings
1966	Calgary Buffaloes	Edmonton Canadians
1965	Calgary Buffaloes	Calgary Cowboys

== National championships ==
AJHL teams have won the national championship 12 times since 1971. The championship trophy had previously been named the Manitoba Centennial Trophy (1971–1995), and the Royal Bank/RBC Cup (1996–2019). The 1994–95 Calgary Canucks were inducted into the Alberta Hockey Hall of fame in 2025.

- 1971 Centennial Cup: Red Deer Rustlers
- 1975 Centennial Cup: Spruce Grove Mets
- 1980 Centennial Cup: Red Deer Rustlers
- 1994 Centennial Cup: Olds Grizzlys
- 1995 Centennial Cup: Calgary Canucks
- 2000 Royal Bank Cup: Fort McMurray Oil Barons
- 2001 Royal Bank Cup: Camrose Kodiaks
- 2013 Royal Bank Cup: Brooks Bandits
- 2019 National Junior A Hockey Championship: Brooks Bandits
- 2022 Centennial Cup: Brooks Bandits
- 2023 Centennial Cup: Brooks Bandits
- 2025 Centennial Cup: Calgary Canucks

== Notable alumni ==
As of 2006, nearly 200 AJHL alumni have gone on to play in professional leagues. Among them:

- Craig Adams
- Dave Babych
- Stu Barnes
- Bob Bassen
- Jay Beagle
- Dan Blackburn
- Mike Commodore
- Mike Comrie
- John Davidson
- Brennan Evans
- Rob Flockhart
- Curtis Glencross
- Kevin Haller
- Scott Hartnell
- Dany Heatley
- Cale Hulse
- Adin Hill
- Corey Hirsch
- Braden Holtby
- Chad Johnson
- Kelly Kisio
- Mark Letestu
- Clarke MacArthur
- Cale Makar
- Clint Malarchuk
- Emerance Maschmeyer
- Richard Matvichuk
- Lanny McDonald
- Mark Messier
- Randy Moller
- Matt Murray
- Troy Murray
- Dana Murzyn
- Mike Needham
- Jim Nill
- Colton Parayko
- Chris Phillips
- Fernando Pisani
- Brayden Point
- Nolan Pratt
- Mason Raymond
- Wade Redden
- Steven Reinprecht
- Sheldon Rempal
- Carter Rowney
- Lindy Ruff
- Ben Scrivens
- Geoff Smith
- Jason Smith
- Sheldon Souray
- Brent Sutter
- Brian Sutter
- Darryl Sutter
- Duane Sutter
- Rich Sutter
- Ron Sutter
- Ken Sutton
- Sam Steel
- Shannon Szabados
- Logan Thompson
- Garry Unger
- Scottie Upshall
- Garry Valk
- Mike Vernon
- Stan Weir
- Nick Weiss
- Craig Weller
- Glen Wesley
- Zarley Zalapski
