= Calgary Canucks =

Junior ice hockey club

- City: Calgary
- League: AJHL
- Division: South
- Founded: 1971
- Home arena: Ken Bracko Arena
- Colours: Crimson; Goldenrod
- President: Sandy Edmonstone
- General manager: Ryan Rarick
- Head coach: Geoff Rollins
- Website: calgarycanucks.ca

Championships
- League: 1973; 1977; 1978; 1983; 1986; 1988; 1990; 1995; 1999; 2024; 2025
- Regional: 1988; 1995
- National: 1995; 2025

The Calgary Canucks are a junior ice hockey team in the Alberta Junior Hockey League (AJHL). They play in Calgary, Alberta, Canada, with home games at the Ken Bracko Arena. They have won the AJHL championship 11 times and two national championship. The team was selected to host the 2025 Centennial Cup National Junior A championship tournament.

== History ==
Founded in 1971, the Calgary Canucks are the oldest franchise still operating in the Alberta Junior Hockey League (AJHL), taking that title when the Spruce Grove Saints joined the British Columbia Hockey League in 2024. The Canucks franchise also has the longest tenure of any in the AJHL in one city.

The Canucks organization was formed of a group led by Doug Eastcott in order to create a junior team so that local players did not have to live away from where they attended school. As the team considered itself a Calgary-based development system, it set an internal limit of three "imports" (non-Calgary area players) per season. The import cap was eventually dropped as the AJHL has added more teams in the Calgary region such as the Calgary Royals and Okotoks Oilers, causing the team to recruit from a larger region.

The Canucks unveiled their new logo, a bull, ahead of the 2019–20 season. The team colours were changed from blue and green to red and yellow ahead of the 2022–23 season.

During the 2021–22 season, while renovations made their home Ken Bracko Arena unavailable, the Canucks played their home games at Henry Viney Arena.

The Canucks qualified for the playoffs 34 consecutive seasons, a streak finally broken in 2006–07. The team has 12 regular season titles, 11 AJHL championships, two Doyle Cup titles, and two Centennial Cup National Junior A Championships. The 1994–95 Canucks were inducted into the Alberta Hockey Hall of Fame in 2025.

Statistics
Season	GP	W	L	T	OTL	SOL	Pts	GF	GA	Finish	Playoffs
1984–85	60	30	29	1	0	0	61	293	285	3rd South	Lost Quarterfinals, 2–4 vs. Calgary Spurs
1985–86	52	33	19	0	0	0	66	248	208	1st South	Won Quarterfinals, 4–0 vs. Olds Grizzlys; Won Semifinals, 4–0 vs. Hobbema Hawks; Won AJHL Championship, 4–3 vs. Sherwood Park Crusaders; Lost Doyle Cup. 1–4 vs. Penticton Knights (BCJHL)
1986–87	60	39	18	3	0	0	81	315	217	1st South	Won Quarterfinals, 4–0 vs. Hobbema Hawks; Lost Semifinals, 3–4 vs. Red Deer Rustlers
1987–88	60	51	9	0	0	0	102	402	196	1st South	Won Quarterfinals, 4–1 vs. Calgary Spurs; Won Semifinals, 4–0 vs. Red Deer Rustlers; Won AJHL Championship, 4–1 vs. St. Albert Saints; Won Doyle Cup, 4–0 vs. Vernon Lakers (BCJHL); Lost Abbott Cup, 3–4 vs. Notre Dame Hounds (SJHL)
1988–89	60	34	22	4	0	0	72	285	217	3rd South	Lost Quarterfinals, 1–4 vs. Olds Grizzlys
1989–90	60	47	11	2	0	0	96	373	238	1st South	Won Quarterfinals, 4–3 vs. St. Albert Saints; Won Semifinals, 4–1 vs. Olds Grizzlys; Won AJHL Championship, 4–2 vs. Sherwood Park Crusaders; Lost Doyle Cup, 0–4 vs. New Westminster Royals (BCJHL)
1990–91	56	23	32	1	0	0	47	229	249	6th Overall	Lost Quarterfinals, 0–4 vs. Calgary Royals
1991–92	60	31	28	0	0	1	63	266	229	5th Overall	Lost Quarterfinals, 3–4 vs. Fort McMurray Oil Barons
1992–93	56	31	23	0	0	2	64	223	214	5th Overall	Lost Quarterfinals, 2–5 vs. St. Albert Saints
1993–94	56	28	21	0	0	7	63	242	227	5th Overall	Lost Quarterfinals, 3–4 vs. Fort McMurray Oil Barons
1994–95	56	36	20	0	0	0	72	307	222	2nd Overall	Won Quarterfinals, 4–1 vs. Bonnyville Pontiacs; Won Semifinals, 4–3 vs. Fort McMurray Oil Barons; Won AJHL Championship, 4–1 vs. Olds Grizzlys; Won Doyle Cup, 4–3 vs. Chilliwack Chiefs (BCHL); Won 1995 Centennial Cup National Championship
1995–96	60	42	14	0	0	4	88	281	213	1st Overall	Won Quarterfinals, 4–1 vs. Calgary Royals; Lost Semifinals, 1–4 vs. Fort McMurray Oil Barons
1996–97	60	37	18	0	0	5	79	257	201	1st Overall	Won Quarterfinals, 4–2 vs. Bonnyville Pontiacs; Won Semifinals. 4–1 vs. Grande Prairie Storm; Lost AJHL Finals, 3–4 vs. Fort McMurray Oil Barons
1997–98	60	36	19	0	0	5	77	243	202	4th Overall	Won Quarterfinals, 4–0 vs. Fort McMurray Oil Barons; Lost Semifinals, 3–4 vs. St. Albert Saints
1998–99	62	50	8	0	0	4	104	350	159	1st South	Won Quarterfinals, 4–0 vs. Camrose Kodiaks; Won Semifinals, 4–1 vs. Olds Grizzlys; Won AJHL Championship, 4–0 vs. St. Albert Saints; Lost Doyle Cup, 1–4 vs. Vernon Vipers (BCHL)
1999–00	64	28	31	0	0	5	61	239	243	6th South	Lost Preliminary series, 1–3 vs. Olds Grizzlys
2000–01	64	34	26	4	0	0	72	269	269	3rd South	Lost Preliminary series, 1–3 vs. Calgary Royals
2001–02	64	29	28	7	0	0	65	256	286	5th South	Lost Preliminary series, 2–3 vs. Calgary Royals
2002–03	64	31	26	7	0	0	69	229	225	5th South	Lost Preliminary series, 0–4 vs. Camrose Kodiaks
2003–04	60	34	17	9	0	0	77	209	177	3rd South	Won Preliminary series, 3–1 vs. Crowsnest Pass Timberwolves; Lost Quarterfinals, 1–4 vs. Olds Grizzlys
2004–05	64	32	25	7	0	0	71	205	202	3rd South	Won Preliminary series, 3–0 vs. Drumheller Dragons; Lost Quarterfinals, 3–4 vs. Brooks Bandits
2005–06	60	20	34	0	6	0	46	154	205	7th South	Won Preliminary series, 3–1 vs. Olds Grizzlys; Lost Quarterfinals, 0–4 vs. Camrose Kodiaks
2006–07	60	18	36	2	4	0	42	174	239	8th South	Did not qualify
2007–08	62	19	38	1	4	0	43	162	225	7th South	Lost Preliminary series, 1–3 vs. Okotoks Oilers
2008–09	62	31	21	4	6	0	72	173	167	4th South	Lost Div. Quarterfinals, 1–3 vs. Camrose Kodiaks
2009–10	60	29	27	3	1	0	62	214	225	4th South	Lost Div. Quarterfinals, 1–3 vs. Brooks Bandits
2010–11	60	18	37	0	4	1	41	178	280	8th South	Did not qualify
2011–12	60	19	36	0	3	2	43	169	213	6th South	Won Div. Quarterfinals, 3–1 vs. Camrose Kodiaks; Lost Div. Semifinals, 0–4 vs. Brooks Bandits
2012–13	60	16	39	0	4	1	37	137	243	8th South	Did not qualify
2013–14	60	15	42	0	2	1	33	156	232	8th South	Did not qualify
2014–15	60	17	33	0	5	5	44	160	234	8th South	Did not qualify
2015–16	60	24	33	0	2	1	51	156	218	6th of 8, South; 11th of 16, AJHL	Lost Div. Quarterfinals, 0–3 vs. Okotoks Oilers
2016–17	60	37	19	0	1	3	78	219	157	3rd of 8, South; 7th of 16, AJHL	Won Div. Quarterfinals, 3–2 vs. Drumheller Dragons; Lost Div. Semifinals, 0–4 vs. Okotoks Oilers
2017–18	60	26	32	0	2	0	54	199	256	6th of 8, South; 11th of 16, AJHL	Lost Div. Quarterfinals, 1–3 vs. Drumheller Dragons
2018–19	60	9	49	0	0	2	20	127	332	7th of 8, South; 15th of 16, AJHL	Lost Div. Quarterfinals, 0–3 vs. Okotoks Oilers
2019–20	58	9	46	0	1	2	21	118	299	7th of 7, South; 15th of 15, AJHL	Did not qualify
2020–21	15	3	11	0	1	0	7	35	67	align=center colspan=2	Season cancelled
2021–22	60	15	39	0	5	1	36	144	261	7th of 8, South; 15th of 16, AJHL	Lost Div. Quarterfinals, 2-4 vs. Drumheller Dragons
2022–23	60	19	32	0	6	3	47	185	268	7th of 8, South; 13th of 16, AJHL	Lost Div. Quarterfinals, 1-4 vs. Blackfalds Bulldogs
2023–24	57	31	23	0	1	2	65	176	190	3rd overall	Won quarterfinal against Grande Prairie (4:2); Won semifinal against Drumheller (4:1); Won final against Whitecourt (4:0)
2024–25	54	37	13	0	2	2	78	255	139	1st in division 1st overall	Won quarterfinal against Camrose (4:1); Won semifinal against Drumheller (4:0); Won final against Grande Prairie (4:0); Won national championship against Melfort Mustangs (7:2)
2025–26	55	25	25	0	3	2	55	191	195	4th in division 9th overall	Lost quarterfinal against Canmore (4:2)

Source: "Calgary Canucks statistics and history". hockeydb.com.

=== National championships ===
The National Junior A Championship, known as the Centennial Cup and formerly as Royal Bank Cup or RBC Cup, is the postseason tournament for the Canadian national championship for Junior A hockey teams that are members of the Canadian Junior Hockey League since 1971. Since 1986, the tournament has consisted of the regional Junior A champions and a previously selected host team. Since 1990, the national championship has used a five-team tournament format when the regional qualifiers were designated as the ANAVET Cup (Western), Doyle Cup (Pacific), Dudley Hewitt Cup (Central), and Fred Page Cup (Eastern). From 2013 to 2017, the qualifiers were the Dudley Hewitt Cup (Central), Fred Page Cup (Eastern), and the Western Canada Cup champions and runners-up (Western #1 and #2).

The tournament begins with round-robin play between the five teams followed by the top four teams playing a semifinal game, with the top seed facing the fourth seed and the second facing the third. The winners of the semifinals then face each other in final game for the national championship. In some years, the losers of the semifinal games face each other for a third place game.

The 1994–95 Calgary Canucks were inducted into the Alberta Hockey Hall of fame in 2025.

Year	Round-robin	Record	Standing	Semifinal	Championship game
1995	W, 1–0 (Note: Due to a challenge by the Canucks on a Joliette rules violation, the 5–1 loss was overturned.) vs. Le National de Joliette (Eastern); W, 6–0 vs. Thunder Bay Flyers (Central); W, 5–4 vs. Gloucester Rangers (Host); L, 3–6 vs. Winnipeg South Blues (Western)	3–1 (W–L)	1st of 5	W, 5–3 vs. Thunder Bay Flyers	W, 5–4 vs. Gloucester Rangers; Centennial Cup National Junior A Champions

Year	Round-robin	Record	Standing	Quarterfinal	Semifinal	Championship
2024	L, Collingwood Blues (OJHL), 4-5; W, Collège Français de Longueuil (QJHL), 5-1; W, Greater Sudbury Cubs (NOJHL), 3-2; SOW, Navan Grads (CCHL), 3-2	2-1-1	2nd of 5 Group A	Won 4-2; Winkler Flyers	Lost 1-2; Melfort Mustangs	did not qualify
2025; HOST	W, Melfort Mustangs (SJHL), 3-1; W, Valleyfield Braves (QJHL), 11-6; L, Rockland Nationals (CCHL), 2-7; W, Edmundston Blizzard (MHL), 8-2	3-0-1-0	1st of 5 Group B	Earned bye	OT Win, 2-1; Rockland Nationals (CCHL)	Won, 7-2; Melfort Mustangs (SJHL); Centennial Cup Champions

== NHL alumni ==
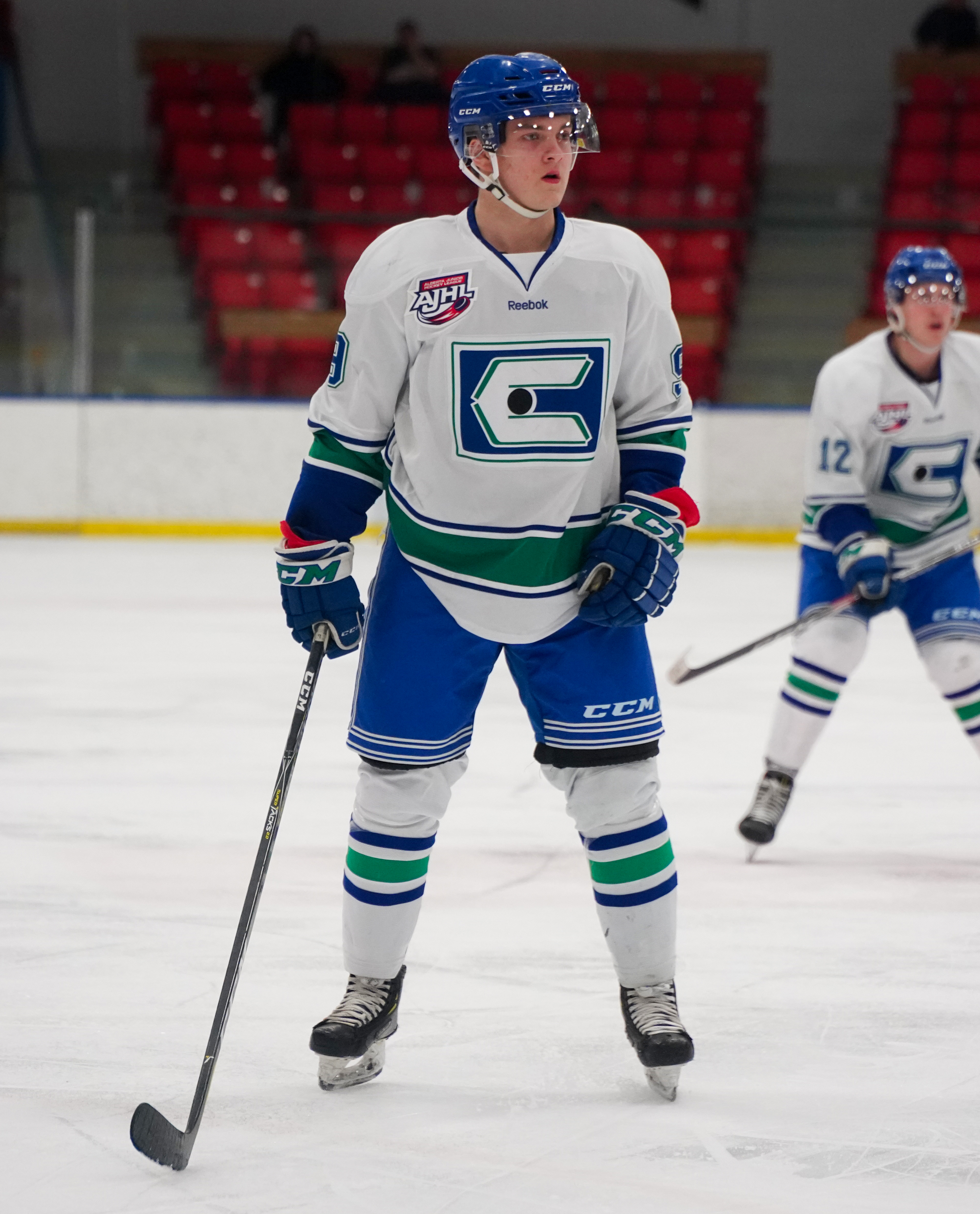
Cole Svenson with the Calgary Canucks vs Drumheller Dragons on Heritage Night (1-18-20)

The following former Canucks have gone on to play in the National Hockey League (NHL):

- Craig Adams
- Mark Astley
- Bob Bassen
- Murray Brumwell
- Don Cairns
- Aaron Dell
- Mark Fitzpatrick
- Dany Heatley
- Mike Heidt
- Adin Hill
- Corey Hirsch
- Doug Houda
- Terry Johnson
- Dean Magee
- Ross McKay
- Dana Murzyn
- Myles O'Connor
- Brandy Semchuk
- Jason Smith
- Tony Stiles
- Ken Sutton
- Brad Turner
- Brian Tutt
- Mike Vernon

== See also ==
- List of ice hockey teams in Alberta
- Ice hockey in Calgary
- Calgary Buffaloes (AJHL)
- Calgary Cowboys (AJHL)
- Calgary Spurs

Preceded by Olds Grizzlys	Centennial Cup Champions; 1995	Succeeded by Vernon Vipers
