= Camrose Kodiaks =

Junior ice hockey team

- City: Camrose, Alberta
- League: AJHL
- Division: South
- Founded: 1997
- Home arena: Spectator Arena
- Colours
- General manager: Eric Kroetch
- Head coach: Geoff Walker
- Website: camrosekodiaks.ca

Championships
- League: 2001; 2003; 2005; 2007; 2008
- Regional: 2001; 2003; 2005; 2007; 2008
- National: 2001

The Camrose Kodiaks are a junior ice hockey club and franchise of the Alberta Junior Hockey League (AJHL). The team plays its home games at the Spectator Arena in Camrose, Alberta.

== History ==
The Camrose Sport Development Society established the Camrose Kodiaks as an expansion franchise of the AJHL in 1997. The team began playing its home games at the 1,200-seat Max McLean Arena, and later moved to the 2,500-seat Spectator Arena.

The 1997–98 Kodiaks finished their inaugural in 12th place and failed to qualify for the playoffs. In the 2000–01 season, Camrose won the AJHL championship, defeated the Victoria Salsa in the Doyle Cup, and won the 2001 Royal Bank Cup national Junior A championship by defeating the host Flin Flon Bombers 5–0 in the final.

The Kodiaks won AJHL and regional Doyle Cup championships in 2001, 2003, 2005, 2007 and 2008, and appeared at the Royal Bank Cup in 2001, 2003, 2005, 2007, 2008 and 2011. The AJHL has noted that the team had 11 players drafted into the NHL from 2000 to 2010, including first-round selection Joe Colborne.

In 2011, the Kodiaks hosted the RBC Cup at the Edgeworth Centre in Camrose. The tournament included the host Kodiaks, Vernon Vipers, Portage Terriers, Wellington Dukes and Pembroke Lumber Kings. Camrose finished the round robin with a 3–1 record before losing 4–2 to Pembroke in the semifinal.

Statistics
| Season | GP | W | L | T/OTL | SOL | Pts | GF | GA | Regular season | Post-season |
|---|---|---|---|---|---|---|---|---|---|---|
| 1997–98 | 60 | 12 | 44 | 0 | 4 | 28 | 150 | 280 | 12th overall | Did not qualify |
| 1998–99 | 62 | 26 | 33 | 0 | 3 | 55 | 234 | 265 | 4th in division | Won first round against Bow Valley (2:0); Lost quarterfinal against Calgary (4:0) |
| 1999–00 | 64 | 38 | 23 | 0 | 3 | 79 | 253 | 238 | 2nd in division | Won quarterfinal against Olds (4:1); Won semifinal against Drayton Valley (4:3); Lost final against Fort McMurray (4:0) |
| 2000–01 | 64 | 44 | 15 | 5 | 0 | 93 | 313 | 222 | 1st in division | Won quarterfinal against Calgary (4:2); Won semifinal against Grande Storm (4:1); Won final against Drayton Valley (4:1) |
| 2001–02 | 64 | 34 | 27 | 3 | 0 | 71 | 294 | 233 | 3rd in division | Won first round against Crowsnest Pass (3:0); Lost quarterfinal against Olds (4:2) |
| 2002–03 | 64 | 40 | 19 | 5 | 0 | 85 | 253 | 190 | 2nd in division | Won first round against Calgary (4:0); Won quarterfinal against Olds (4:1); Won semifinal against Canmore (4:1); Won final against St. Albert (4:3) |
| 2003–04 | 60 | 43 | 13 | 4 | 0 | 90 | 243 | 168 | 1st in division | Won quarterfinal against Calgary (4:1); Lost semifinal against Fort McMurrary (4:2) |
| 2004–05 | 64 | 48 | 8 | 8 | 0 | 104 | 274 | 154 | 1st in division | Won quarterfinal against Canmore (4:0); Won semifinal against Brooks (4:0); Won final against Fort McMurray (4:3) |
| 2005–06 | 60 | 29 | 20 | 11 | 0 | 69 | 179 | 156 | 1st in division | Won quarterfinal against Calgary (4:0); Won semifinal against Spruce Grove (4:2); Lost final against Fort McMurray (4:2) |
| 2006–07 | 60 | 46 | 13 | 1 | 0 | 93 | 241 | 140 | 1st in division | Won quarterfinal against Olds (4:1); Won semifinal against Grande Prairie (4:2); Won final against Fort Saskatchewan (4:2) |
| 2007–08 | 62 | 49 | 8 | 5 | 0 | 103 | 240 | 139 | 1st in division | Won quarterfinal against Olds (4:2); Won semifinal against Drumheller (4:1); Won final against Fort McMurray (4:3) |
| 2008–09 | 62 | 29 | 28 | 5 | 0 | 63 | 179 | 189 | 5th in division | Won first round against Calgary (3:1); Lost quarterfinal against Brooks (4:3) |
| 2009–10 | 60 | 32 | 17 | 11 | 0 | 75 | 201 | 170 | 2nd in division | Won first round against Calgary (3:2); Won quarterfinal against Brooks (4:1); Lost semifinal Spruce Grove (4:1) |
| 2010–11 | 60 | 32 | 22 | 6 | 0 | 70 | 199 | 172 | 3rd in division | Won first round against Drumheller (3:1); Won quarterfinal against Brooks (4:3); Won semifinal against Okotoks (4:3); Lost final against Spruce Grove (4:1) |
| 2011–12 | 60 | 33 | 21 | 6 | 0 | 72 | 166 | 150 | 3rd in division | Lost first round against Canucks (3:1) |
| 2012–13 | 60 | 35 | 19 | 6 | 0 | 76 | 184 | 163 | 3rd in division | Won first round against Calgary (3:1); Lost quarterfinal against Okotoks (4:0) |
| 2013–14 | 60 | 29 | 21 | 10 | 0 | 68 | 175 | 186 | 4th in division | Lost first round against Canmore (3:1) |
| 2014–15 | 60 | 48 | 8 | 4 | 0 | 100 | 230 | 129 | 1st in division | Won quartefinal against Drumheller (4:1); Lost semifinal against Brooks (4:3) |
| 2015–16 | 60 | 38 | 18 | 4 | 0 | 80 | 250 | 170 | 2nd in division 7th overall | Won first round against Olds (3:0); Won quarterfinal against Okotoks (4:1); Lost semifinal against Brooks (4:0) |
| 2016–17 | 60 | 32 | 25 | 3 | 0 | 67 | 186 | 177 | 5th in division 9th overall | Lost first round against Okotoks (3:0) |
| 2017–18 | 60 | 24 | 24 | 12 | 0 | 60 | 193 | 202 | 4th in division 7th overall | Won first round against Calgary Mustangs (3:0); Lost quarterfinal against Okotoks (4:0) |
| 2018–19 | 60 | 32 | 21 | 7 | 0 | 71 | 211 | 189 | 4th in division 8th overall | Won first round against Calgary (3:2); Lost quarterfinal against Okotoks (4:1) |
| 2019–20 | 58 | 31 | 24 | 3 | 0 | 65 | 203 | 204 | 4th in division 8th overall | Won first round against Canmore (4:3); Postseason cancelled |
| 2020–21 | 9 | 5 | 4 | 0 | 0 | 10 | 36 | 29 | 3rd in division 7th overall | Season cancelled |
| 2021–22 | 60 | 33 | 24 | 2 | 1 | 69 | 214 | 201 | 3rd in division 7th overall | Lost first round against Canmore (4:3) |
| 2022–23 | 60 | 27 | 30 | 2 | 1 | 57 | 177 | 229 | 5th in division 10th overall | Lost first round against Canmore (4:0) |
| 2023–24 | 57 | 25 | 29 | 2 | 1 | 53 | 176 | 204 | 8th overall | Lost first round against Whitecourt (4:1) |
| 2024–25 | 54 | 30 | 16 | 3 | 5 | 68 | 179 | 175 | 4th in division 5th overall | Lost first round against Calgary (4:1) |
| 2025–26 | 55 | 28 | 24 | 2 | 1 | 59 | 191 | 199 | 3rd in division 7th overall | Lost first round against Drumheller (4:3) |

Source: "Camrose Kodiaks statistics and history". hockeydb.com.

== National Championships ==
The National Junior A Championship, known as the Centennial Cup and formerly as the Royal Bank Cup or RBC Cup, is the postseason tournament for the Canadian national championship for Junior A hockey teams that are members of the Canadian Junior Hockey League.

| Year | Round-robin | Record | Standing | Semifinal | Championship game |
|---|---|---|---|---|---|
| 2001 | W, 4–1 vs. Thornhill Rattlers (Central); W, 4–3 vs. Weyburn Red Wings (Western); W, 5–1 vs. Flin Flon Bombers (Host); W, 4–3 vs. St. Jerome Panthers (Eastern) | 4–0 (W–L) | 1st of 5 | W, 7–1 vs. St. Jerome Panthers | W, 5–0 vs. Flin Flon Bombers; National Junior A Champions |
| 2003 | L, 2–3 vs. Charlottetown Abbies (Host); W, 7–1 vs. Wellington Dukes (Central); W, 4–1 vs. Lennoxville Cougars (Eastern); W, 5–3 vs. Humboldt Broncos (Western) | 3–1 (W–L) | 1st of 5 | W, 2–1 vs. Lennoxville Cougars | L, 1–3 vs. Humboldt Broncos |
| 2005 | W, 3–2 vs. Hawkesbury Hawks (Eastern); W, 6–2 vs. Portage Terriers (Western); L, 1–3 vs. Weyburn Red Wings (Host); W, 2–1 vs. Georgetown Raiders (Central) | 3–1 (W–L) | 2nd of 5 | W, 8–2 vs. Georgetown Raiders | L, 2–3 vs. Weyburn Red Wings |
| 2007 | W, 4–2 vs. Prince George Spruce Kings (Host); W, 3–1 vs. Selkirk Steelers (Western); W, 3–0 vs. Pembroke Lumber Kings (Eastern); L, 4–7 vs. Aurora Tigers (Central) | 3–1 (W–L) | 2nd of 5 | OTL, 2–3 vs. Prince George Spruce Kings | — |
| 2008 | W, 5–1 vs. Weeks Crushers (Eastern); W, 2–1 vs. Humboldt Broncos (Western); W, 2–1 vs. Cornwall Colts (Host); W, 6–1 vs. Oakville Blades (Central) | 4–0 (W–L) | 1st of 5 | W, 3–0 vs. Weeks Crushers | L, 0–1 vs. Humboldt Broncos |
| 2011; Host | L, 2–4 vs. Vernon Vipers (Pacific); W, 3–2 vs. Wellington Dukes (Central); W, 4–2 vs. Portage Terriers (Western); W, 2–1 vs. Pembroke Lumber Kings (Eastern) | 3–1 (W–L) | 2nd of 5 | L, 2–4 vs. Pembroke Lumber Kings | — |

== Team records ==
The following are selected all-time franchise records listed by the Camrose Kodiaks.

| Category | Record | Player | Seasons |
|---|---|---|---|
| Most goals | 98 | Taggert Desmet | 1999–2002 |
| Most assists | 137 | Riley Riddell | 1997–1999 |
| Most points | 232 | Riley Riddell | 1997–1999 |
| Most penalty minutes | 818 | Craig Perry | 2000–2003 |
| Most games played, skater | 241 | Nelson Gadoury | 2011–2016 |
| Most power-play goals | 27 | Clayton Jardine | 2007–2011 |
| Best goals-against average | 2.03 | Mathieu Larochelle | 2007–2008 |
| Most shutouts | 10 | Devin McDonald; Patrick Gora | 2012–2015; 2014–2017 |
| Most games played, goaltender | 121 | David Thompson | 2003–2006 |

== NHL draft picks ==
The following players were selected in the NHL entry draft from the Camrose Kodiaks.

| Player | Position | Draft year | NHL team | Round | Overall |
|---|---|---|---|---|---|
| Richard Petiot | Defence | 2001 | Los Angeles Kings | 4 | 116 |
| Dan Glover | Defence | 2002 | New Jersey Devils | 8 | 250 |
| Mike Brodeur | Goaltender | 2003 | Chicago Blackhawks | 7 | 211 |
| Matt McKnight | Centre | 2004 | Dallas Stars | 9 | 280 |
| Mason Raymond | Left wing | 2005 | Vancouver Canucks | 2 | 51 |
| T. J. Fast | Defence | 2005 | Los Angeles Kings | 2 | 60 |
| Allen York | Goaltender | 2007 | Columbus Blue Jackets | 6 | 158 |
| Joe Colborne | Centre | 2008 | Boston Bruins | 1 | 16 |
| Andrew MacWilliam | Defence | 2008 | Toronto Maple Leafs | 7 | 188 |
| Dylan Olsen | Defence | 2009 | Chicago Blackhawks | 1 | 28 |
| Ben Gallacher | Defence | 2010 | Florida Panthers | 4 | 93 |
| Sam Jardine | Defence | 2011 | Chicago Blackhawks | 6 | 169 |

== Notable alumni ==
The following former Kodiaks played at least one game for Camrose and later reached the National Hockey League.

| Player | Position | Kodiaks seasons | Kodiaks games |
|---|---|---|---|
| Mike Brodeur | Goaltender | 2001–2003 | 59 |
| Joe Colborne | Centre | 2006–2008 | 108 |
| Mike Connolly | Centre | 2006–2008 | 84 |
| Brennan Evans | Defence | 1998–1999 | 47 |
| Nick Holden | Defence | 2004–2005 | 4 |
| Parker Kelly | Centre | 2014–2015 | 1 |
| Andrew MacWilliam | Defence | 2006–2009 | 113 |
| Evan Oberg | Defence | 2005–2007 | 96 |
| Dylan Olsen | Defence | 2006–2009 | 104 |
| Richard Petiot | Defence | 2000–2001 | 55 |
| Mason Raymond | Left wing | 2003–2005 | 112 |
| MacGregor Sharp | Centre | 2002–2005 | 161 |
| Karl Stollery | Defence | 2004–2008 | 157 |
| Allen York | Goaltender | 2006–2008 | 69 |

== See also ==
- List of ice hockey teams in Alberta

| Preceded by Fort McMurray Oil Barons | Royal Bank Cup Champions; 2001 | Succeeded by Halifax Exports |
