= Spruce Grove Saints =

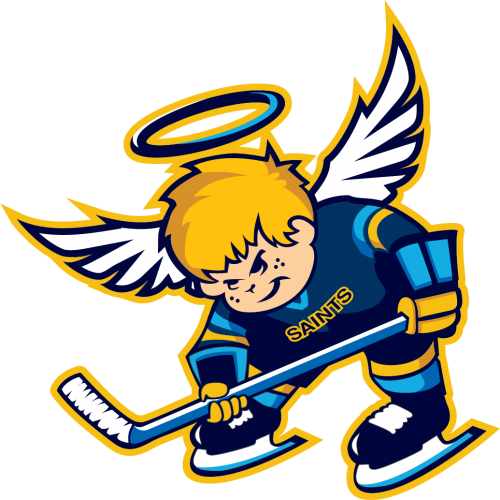
- City: Spruce Grove, Alberta
- League: British Columbia Hockey League
- Conference: Interior
- Division: East
- Founded: 1963
- Home arena: Thompson Family Arena
- Colours: Navy blue, baby blue, white and gold
- Owners: Silent Ice (Dan Leckelt, Lindsay Leckelt, Ryan Smyth)
- General manager: Rob Sklaruk
- Head coach: Martin Lachaine
- Website: sgsaints.ca

Franchise history
- 1963–1965: Edmonton Canadians
- 1965–1972: Edmonton Movers
- 1972–1974: Edmonton Mets
- 1974–1977: Spruce Grove Mets
- 1977–2004: St. Albert Saints
- 2004–present: Spruce Grove Saints

Previous franchise history
- 1963–1972: Edmonton Maple Leafs

The Spruce Grove Saints are a Junior ice hockey team in the British Columbia Hockey League (BCHL). They play in Spruce Grove, Alberta, Canada, with home games at the Thompson Family Arena. The team was originally a member of the Alberta Junior Hockey League (AJHL) and joined the BCHL in 2024.

== History ==
Prior to their 2024 departure, the Saints' franchise was the only franchise remaining from the inception of the Alberta Junior Hockey League (AJHL). The franchise began as the Edmonton Movers in 1963 before it merged with the Edmonton Maple Leafs organization to become the Edmonton Mets for the 1972–73 season. It then relocated to Spruce Grove as the Spruce Grove Mets for the 1974–75 season. During its first stint in Spruce Grove, the Mets won the 1975 Centennial Cup as Canadian Jr. A national champions and two league championships. After three years in Spruce Grove, the franchise relocated again to nearby St. Albert to become the St. Albert Saints in 1977. The franchise captured four AJHL championships during its time in St. Albert.

After 27 years in St. Albert, arena issues caused the franchise to return to Spruce Grove as the Spruce Grove Saints in 2004. Since returning to Spruce Grove, the team has won five AJHL playoff championships and five regular season titles, but have not advanced to the National Junior A Championship after failing to advance past the Doyle Cup or Western Canada Cup qualifiers.

On January 20, 2024, it was announced that the team, along with four other AJHL teams, would join the British Columbia Junior Hockey League (BCHL) in the 2024–25 season. The AJHL responded to the announcement by cancelling most of the five teams' remaining scheduled matches except those between each other. It was then decided that the five Alberta-based teams would play out the rest of the 2023–24 season as a separate division under the aegis of the BCHL. On July 18, 2024, the team unveiled an updated logo and colour scheme as part of a brand refresh ahead of the upcoming season. On May 10, 2025, the team hosted a grand opening of Thompson Family Arena, their newly constructed home facility.

Over 50 former Saints players have gone on to play in the National Hockey League, including Mark Messier, Stu Barnes, Mike Comrie, and Steven Reinprecht.

== Season-by-season record ==
Note: GP = Games played, W = Wins, L = Losses, T/OTL = Ties/Overtime losses, Pts = Points, GF = Goals for, GA = Goals against

| Season | GP | W | L | T/OTL | Pts | GF | GA | Finish | Playoffs |
|---|---|---|---|---|---|---|---|---|---|
| 2004–05 | 64 | 42 | 16 | 6 | 90 | 208 | 147 | 2nd North | Won Preliminary series, 3–0 vs. Lloydminster Blazers; Lost Quarterfinals, 2–4 vs. Drayton Valley Thunder |
| 2005–06 | 60 | 39 | 18 | 3 | 81 | 197 | 160 | 3rd North | Won Preliminary series, 3–0 vs. Fort Saskatchewan Traders; Won Quarterfinals, 4–3 vs. Drayton Valley Thunder; Lost Semifinals, 2–4 vs. Camrose Kodiaks |
| 2006–07 | 60 | 32 | 20 | 8 | 72 | 213 | 186 | 3rd North | Won Preliminary series, 3–2 vs. Bonnyville Pontiacs; Lost Quarterfinals, 1–4 vs. Grande Prairie Storm |
| 2007–08 | 62 | 34 | 16 | 12 | 80 | 248 | 203 | 3rd North | Won Preliminary series, 3–0 vs. Lloydminster Bobcats; Won Quarterfinals, 4–3 vs. Grande Prairie Storm; Lost Semifinals, 1–4 vs. Fort McMurray Oil Barons |
| 2008–09 | 62 | 46 | 7 | 9 | 101 | 274 | 139 | 1st North | Won Div. Semifinals, 4–1 vs. Fort McMurray Oil Barons; Won Div. Finals, 4–0 vs. Olds Grizzlys; Lost AJHL Finals, 0–4 vs. Grande Prairie Storm |
| 2009–10 | 60 | 52 | 4 | 4 | 108 | 252 | 99 | 1st North | Won Div. Semifinals, 4–0 vs. Bonnyville Pontiacs; Won Div. Finals, 4–1 vs. Camrose Kodiaks; Won AJHL Championship, 4–3 vs. Fort McMurray Oil Barons; Lost Doyle Cup, 3–4 vs. Vernon Vipers (BCHL) |
| 2010–11 | 60 | 48 | 8 | 4 | 100 | 233 | 106 | 1st North | Won Div. Semifinals, 4–0 vs. Lloydminster Bobcats; Won Div. Finals, 4–0 vs. Fort McMurray Oil Barons; Won AJHL Championship, 4–1 vs. Camrose Kodiaks; Lost Doyle Cup, 3–4 vs. Vernon Vipers (BCHL) |
| 2011–12 | 60 | 46 | 6 | 8 | 100 | 214 | 129 | 1st North | Won Div. Semifinals, 4–0 vs. Drayton Valley Thunder; Lost Div. Finals, 3–4 vs. Fort McMurray Oil Barons |
| 2012–13 | 60 | 35 | 16 | 9 | 79 | 181 | 157 | 1st North | Won Div. Semifinals, 4–2 vs. Sherwood Park Crusaders; Won Div. Finals, 4–1 vs. Whitecourt Wolverines; Lost AJHL Finals, 1–4 vs. Brooks Bandits |
| 2013–14 | 60 | 47 | 10 | 3 | 97 | 235 | 135 | 1st North | Won Div. Semifinals, 4–3 vs. Sherwood Park Crusaders; Won Div. Finals, 4–3 vs. Fort McMurray Oil Barons; Won AJHL Championship, 4–0 vs. Drumheller Dragons; Did not advance in 2014 Western Canada Cup |
| 2014–15 | 60 | 48 | 7 | 5 | 101 | 254 | 121 | 1st North | Won Div. Semifinals, 4–2 vs. Sherwood Park Crusaders; Won Div. Finals, 4–2 vs. Bonnyville Pontiacs; Won AJHL Championship, 4–2 vs. Brooks Bandits; Did not advance in 2015 Western Canada Cup |
| 2015–16 | 60 | 49 | 7 | 4 | 101 | 263 | 123 | 1st North | Won Div. Semifinals, 4–0 vs. Sherwood Park Crusaders; Won Div. Finals, 4–1 vs. Lloydminster Bobcats; Lost AJHL Finals, 1–4 vs. Brooks Bandits |
| 2016–17 | 60 | 40 | 18 | 2 | 82 | 198 | 145 | 3rd North | Won Div. Quarterfinals, 3–0 vs. Drayton Valley Thunder; Lost Div. Semifinals, 3–4 vs. Whitecourt Wolverines |
| 2017–18 | 60 | 47 | 10 | 3 | 97 | 262 | 138 | 1st of 8, North; 2nd of 16, AJHL | Won Div. Semifinals, 4–0 vs. Grande Prairie Storm; Won Div. Finals, 4–0 vs. Whitecourt Wolverines; Won AJHL Championship, 4–1 vs. Okotoks Oilers; Lost Doyle Cup, 4–1 vs. Wenatchee Wild (BCHL) |
| 2018–19 | 60 | 40 | 17 | 3 | 83 | 204 | 141 | 3rd of 8, North; 4th of 16, AJHL | Won Div. Quarterfinals, 3–1 vs. Drayton Valley Thunder; Won Div. Semifinals, 4–0 vs. Bonnyville Pontiacs; Won Div. Finals, 4–2 vs. Sherwood Park Crusaders; Lost AJHL Finals, 4–0 vs. Brooks Bandits |
| 2019–20 | 58 | 43 | 13 | 2 | 88 | 246 | 155 | 2nd of 8, North; 4th of 15, AJHL | Won Div. Quarterfinals, 4–2 vs. Grande Prairie Storm; Postseason cancelled |
seasons 2020-2021 to 2022-23 not recorded
BCHL
| 2023–24 | 66 | 26 | 34 | 6 | 58 | 82 | 108 | 5th of 5, Alta Div | Lost Div. Playin, 0-3 vs. Okotoks Oilers |
| 2024–25 | 54 | 19 | 29 | 6 | 44 | 164 | 228 | 9th of 11, Interior Div; 18th of 21 BCHL | Did Not Qualify |

=== Western Canada Cup ===
The Western Canada Cup was a postseason tournament between the playoff champions of the AJHL, BCHL, Manitoba Junior Hockey League (MJHL), Saskatchewan Junior Hockey League (SJHL), and a previously selected host team from one of the leagues. It ran from 2013 to 2017 with the top two teams qualifying for the Royal Bank Cup Junior A national championship tournament. It replaced the Doyle Cup, which had been the qualifier for the AJHL and BCHL champions, and the ANAVET Cup, which had been the qualifier for the MJHL and SJHL champions. The qualifying system reverted the Doyle and ANAVET Cups in 2018.

The tournament began with round-robin play between the five team followed by the top two teams playing in championship game and the third and fourth place teams playing in a semifinal game. The loser of the championship game then faced the winner of the semifinal game for the runner-up qualifier. The winner of the championship and the runner-up game advanced to the Royal Bank Cup.

| Year | Round-robin | Record | Standing | Semifinal | Championship game | Runner-up game |
|---|---|---|---|---|---|---|
| 2014 | L, 2–4 vs. Dauphin Kings (Host); L, 1–3 vs. Coquitlam Express (BCHL); OTW, 3–2 vs. Yorkton Terriers (SJHL); W, 5–3 vs. Winnipeg Blues (MJHL) | 2–2–0 (W–L–OTL) | 3rd of 5 | W, 5–3 vs. Coquitlam Express | — | L, 2–4 vs. Dauphin Kings |
| 2015 | L, 3–11 vs. Penticton Vees (BCHL); OTL, 3–4 vs. Melfort Mustangs (SJHL); L, 4–5 vs. Fort McMurray Oil Barons (Host); L, 2–4 vs. Portage Terriers (MJHL) | 0–4 (W–L) | 5th of 5 | Did not advance | | |

== See also ==
- List of ice hockey teams in Alberta
