= Calgary Spurs =

- City: Calgary, Alberta
- League: Alberta Junior Hockey League
- Division: South
- Operated: 1978–1990

Franchise history
- 1972–1976: The Pass Red Devils
- 1976–1978: Pincher Creek Panthers
- 1978–1979: Calgary Chinooks
- 1979–1990: Calgary Spurs
- 1990–2010: Calgary Royals
- 2010–2019: Calgary Mustangs
- 2021–: Blackfalds Bulldogs

The Calgary Spurs were a Junior A ice hockey team in the Alberta Junior Hockey League. Founded in 1972 as The Pass Red Devils and following a two-year stop as the Pincher Creek Panthers, the franchise became the second AJHL franchise in Calgary (along with the Calgary Canucks) in 1978 as the Calgary Chinooks. The team became the Spurs one year later, retaining the name until the franchise went bankrupt in 1990. The assets of the defunct Spurs franchise were purchased by new investors and recreated as the Calgary Royals. As the Spurs, the team won two regular season titles in the AJHL, but never captured a playoff championship.

== Season-by-season record ==
Note: GP = Games played, W = Wins, L = Losses, T = Ties, Pts = Points, GF = Goals for, GA = Goals against

Season	GP	W	L	T	GF	GA	Pts	Finish	Playoffs
1978–79	60	23	37	0	262	315	46	5th Overall	Lost Quarterfinals, 0–4 vs. Fort Saskatchewan Traders
1979–80	60	31	28	1	303	278	63	4th Overall	Won Quarterfinals, 3–2 vs. Taber Golden Suns; Lost Semifinals, 0–4 vs. Calgary Canucks
1980–81	60	42	16	2	339	231	86	1st South	Won Quarterfinals, 3–0 vs. Drumheller Falcons; Lost Semifinals, 2–4 vs. Taber Golden Suns
1981–82	60	49	9	2	363	203	100	1st South	Won Quarterfinals, 4–0 vs. Olds Grizzlys; Won Semifinals, 4–1 vs. Red Deer Rustlers; Lost Finals, 3–4 vs. St. Albert Saints
1982–83	60	30	29	1	313	307	61	3rd South	Lost Quarterfinals, 0–4 vs. Calgary Canucks
1983–84	60	24	33	3	277	308	51	3rd South	Won Quarterfinals, 4–3 vs. Olds Grizzlys; Lost Semifinals, 1–4 vs. Red Deer Rustlers
1984–85	60	36	24	0	315	270	72	2nd South	Won Quarterfinals, 4–2 vs. Calgary Canucks; Lost Semifinals, 0–4 vs. Red Deer Rustlers
1985–86	52	27	25	0	235	221	54	3rd South	Lost Quarterfinals, 2–4 vs. Hobbema Hawks
1986–87	60	28	30	2	282	284	58	3rd South	Lost Quarterfinals, 3–4 vs. Red Deer Rustlers
1987–88	60	19	38	3	262	367	41	4th South	Lost Quarterfinals, 1–4 vs. Calgary Canucks
1988–89	60	34	24	2	281	232	70	4th South	Lost Quarterfinals, 1–4 vs. Red Deer Rustlers
1989–90	60	22	36	2	297	320	46	3rd South	Lost Quarterfinals, 0–4 vs. Olds Grizzlys

== See also ==
- List of ice hockey teams in Alberta
- Ice hockey in Calgary
