= Olds Grizzlys =

Junior ice hockey club

- City: Olds, Alberta
- League: AJHL
- Division: South
- Founded: 1974
- Home arena: Olds & District Sports Complex
- Colours: Black; Gold
- Owners: Moe Jamal and Jay Beagle
- General manager: Moe Jamal
- Head coach: Tyson Soloski
- Website: oldsgrizzlys.ca

Franchise history
- 1974–1981: Taber Golden Suns
- Since 1981: Olds Grizzlys

Championships
- League: 1992; 1993; 1994
- Regional: 1994
- National: 1994

The Olds Grizzlys are a junior ice hockey club and franchise of the Alberta Junior Hockey League (AJHL). The team plays its home games at the Olds & District Sports Complex in Olds, Alberta.

== History ==
The Olds Grizzlys joined the Alberta Junior Hockey League (AJHL) after the Taber Golden Suns franchise relocated to Olds following the 1980–81 season. The Grizzlys won three straight league championships, in 1992, 1993 and 1994, and a national championship in 1994.

In 2017, the "Friends of the Grizzlys" assumed ownership of the franchise.

On April 3, 2025, the club announced Calgary business man Moe Jamal and former National Hockey League player Jay Beagle as its new owners.

As of 2025, Moe Jamal has been appointed as the General Manager and Tyson Soloski is the head coach.

Statistics
Season	GP	W	L	T	OTL	SOL	Pts	GF	GA	Regular season	Post-season
1981–82	60	22	35	3	0	0	47	266	270	4th in division 8th overall	Lost quarterfinal against Calgary (4:0)
1982–83	60	25	35	0	0	0	50	315	330	4th in division 8th overall	Lost quarterfinal against Red Deer (4:1)
1983–84	60	29	31	0	0	0	58	285	279	2nd in division 4th overall	Lost quarterfinal against Calgary (4:3)
1984–85	60	13	47	0	0	0	26	212	358	4th in division 8th overall	Lost quarterfinal against Red Deer (4:0)
1985–86	52	14	37	1	0	0	29	225	316	4th in division 8th overall	Lost quarterfinal against Calgary (4:0)
1986–87	60	9	49	2	0	0	20	184	335	4th in division 9th overall	Did not qualify
1987–88	60	26	31	3	0	0	55	296	339	3rd in division 5th overall	Lost quarterfinal against Red Deer (4:2)
1988–89	60	35	23	2	0	0	72	301	261	2nd in division 4th overall	Won quarterfinal against Calgary (4:1); Lost semifinal against Red Deer (4:1)
1989–90	60	39	18	3	0	0	81	350	271	2nd in division 2nd overall	Won quarterfinal against Calgary (4:0); Lost semifinal against Calgary (4:1)
1990–91	56	31	23	2	0	0	64	287	229	3rd overall	Lost quarterfinal against Lloydminster (4:3)
1991–92	60	42	14	0	0	4	88	331	201	1st overall	Won quarterfinal against Sherwood Park (4:0); Won semifinal against Fort Saskatchewan (4:1); Won final against Fort McMurray (4:1); Lost Doyle Cup against Vernon (4:3)
1992–93	56	35	21	0	0	0	70	274	207	2nd overall	Won quarterfinal against Calgary (5:0); Won semifinal against Fort McMurray (4:0); Won final against Fort Saskatchewan (4:3); Lost Doyle Cup against Kelowna (4:1)
1993–94	56	50	4	0	0	2	102	353	140	1st overall	Won quarterfinal against Calgary (4:0); Won semifinal against St. Albert (4:0); Won final against Fort McMurray (4:2); Won Doyle Cup against Kelowna (4:2); Won Abbott Cup; Won 1994 Centennial Cup
1994–95	56	40	16	0	0	0	80	284	209	1st overall	Won quarterfinal against Lloydminster (4:1); Won semifinal against Sherwood Park (4:0); Lost final against Calgary (4:1)
1995–96	60	40	17	0	0	3	83	292	199	2nd overall	Won quarterfinal against Bonnyville (4:1); Lost semifinal against St. Albert (4:0)
1996–97	60	32	24	0	0	4	68	244	217	5th overall	Lost quarterfinal against Fort McMurray (4:0)
1997–98	60	27	31	0	0	2	56	225	246	8th overall	Lost quarterfinal against St. Albert (4:2)
1998–99	62	28	30	0	0	4	60	273	270	3rd in division 9th overall	Won quarterfinal against Calgary (4:0); Lost semifinal against Calgary (4:1)
1999–00	64	35	27	0	0	2	72	281	259	3rd in division 7th overall	Won preliminary series against Calgary (3:1); Lost quarterfinal against Camrose (4:1)
2000–01	64	41	19	4	0	0	86	304	232	2nd in division 3rd overall	Won quarterfinal against Crowsnest Pass (4:0); Lost semifinal against Drayton Valley (4:3)
2001–02	64	36	20	8	0	0	80	298	252	2nd in division 5th overall	Won quarterfinal against Camrose (4:2); Lost semifinal against Drayton Valley (4:0)
2002–03	64	36	19	9	0	0	81	267	226	3rd in division 7th overall	Won quarterfinal against Calgary (4:1); Lost semifinal against Camrose (4:1)
2003–04	60	41	14	5	0	0	87	248	157	2nd in division 2nd overall	Won preliminary series against Drumheller (3:0); Won quarterfinal against Calgary (4:1); Lost semifinal against Grande Prairie (4:2)
2004–05	64	24	32	8	0	0	56	171	218	7th in division 12th overall	Did not qualify
2005–06	60	30	22	4	4	0	68	208	168	2nd in division 8th overall	Lost preliminary series against Calgary (3:1)
2006–07	60	27	27	0	6	0	60	202	208	6th in division 10th overall	Won preliminary series against Canmore (3:1); Lost quarterfinal against Camrose (4:1)
2007–08	62	35	21	0	6	0	76	205	197	4th in division 7th overall	Won preliminary series against Canmore (3:0); Lost quarterfinal against Camrose (4:2)
2008–09	62	35	23	1	3	0	74	225	189	3rd in division 7th overall	Won preliminary series against Drumheller (3:2); Won quarterfinal against Okotoks (4:2); Lost semifinal against Spruce Grove (4:0)
2009–10	60	30	23	2	5	0	67	189	185	3rd in division 7th overall	Lost quarterfinal against Canmore (3:0)
2010–11	60	23	30	0	5	2	53	202	231	5th in division 12th overall	Lost quarterfinal against Calgary (3:0)
2011–12	60	22	33	0	2	3	49	165	217	5th in division 11th overall	Won quarterfinal against Calgary (3:1); Won semifinal against Okotoks (4:2); Lost division final against Brooks (4:0)
2012–13	60	22	32	0	4	2	50	169	211	6th in division 13th overall	Lost quarterfinal against Okotoks (3:2)
2013–14	60	21	30	0	6	3	51	156	205	7th in division 13th overall	Won quarterfinal against Okotoks (3:2); Lost semifinal against Brooks (4:0)
2014–15	60	24	27	0	5	4	57	203	235	5th in division 11th overall	Lost quarterfinal against Drumheller (3:0)
2015–16	60	16	40	0	1	3	36	188	279	7th in division 13th overall	Lost quarterfinal against Camrose (3:0)
2016–17	60	17	36	0	4	3	41	167	234	7th in division 12th overall	Won quarterfinal against Canmore (3:0); Lost semifinal against Brooks (4:0)
2017–18	60	18	37	0	2	3	41	170	272	8th in division 15th overall	Did not qualify
2018–19	60	6	51	0	3	0	15	120	322	8th in division 16th overall	Did not qualify
2019–20	58	10	41	0	5	2	27	157	291	6th in division 14th overall	Lost quarterfinal against Drumheller (4:1)
2020–21	15	2	11	0	2	0	6	31	63	Season cancelled	
2021–22	60	9	45	0	4	2	24	162	302	8th in division 16th overall	Did not qualify
2022–23	60	16	39	0	4	1	37	167	297	8th in division 15th overall	Did not qualify
2023–24	57	10	41	0	3	3	26	123	278	11th overall	Did not qualify
2024–25	54	15	38	0	1	0	31	136	278	6th in division 11th overall	Did not qualify
2025–26	55	16	35	0	2	2	36	152	249	5th in division 11th overall	Did not qualify

Sources: "Olds Grizzlys statistics and history". hockeydb.com.

== National championship ==
The Centennial Cup is awarded annually to the Canadian national Junior A. Since 1986, the tournament has consisted of the regional Junior A champions and a previously selected host team. Since 1990, the national championship has used a five-team tournament format when the regional qualifiers were designated as the ANAVET Cup (Western), Doyle Cup (Pacific), Dudley Hewitt Cup (Central), and Fred Page Cup (Eastern). From 2013 to 2017, the qualifiers were the Dudley Hewitt Cup (Central), Fred Page Cup (Eastern), and the Western Canada Cup champions and runners-up (Western #1 and #2). The tournament adopted a 10-team format in 2022.

Year	Round-robin	Record	Standing	Semifinal	Championship game
1994; Host	W, 11–3 vs. Chateauguay Elites (Central); W, 5–0 vs. Weyburn Red Wings (Western); W, 5–2 vs. Kelowna Spartans (Pacific); W, 10–1 vs. Antigonish Bulldogs (Eastern)	4–0 (W–L)	1st of 5	W, 4–3 vs. Weyburn Red Wings	OTW, 5–4 vs. Kelowna Spartans; National champions

== NHL alumni ==
The following former Grizzlys have gone on to play in the National Hockey League (NHL):

- Darcy Campbell
- Phil Crowe
- Kevin Haller
- Nathan Lawson
- Jay Rosehill
- Matthew Yeats

== See also ==
- List of ice hockey teams in Alberta

Preceded by Kelowna Spartans	Centennial Cup Champions; 1994	Succeeded by Calgary Canucks
