= Enerflex =

Canadian oil and gas equipment manufacturer

Enerflex Ltd.
- Company type: Public
- Traded as: TSX: EFX
- Industry: Oil and Natural Gas
- Founded: Calgary, Alberta (1980)
- Headquarters: Calgary, Alberta, Canada
- Key people: Paul Mahoney, President & CEO, Preet Dhindsa, Senior Vice President & CFO
- Products: Energy & power equipment, hydrocarbon facilities, field maintenance services, and other oil and gas products and services.
- Revenue: $1.405 billion CAN (2018)
- Number of employees: 4,600
- Website: www.enerflex.com

Enerflex Ltd. is a worldwide supplier of products and services to the global power generation and gas production industry, based in Calgary, Alberta.

== Profile ==
Headquartered in Calgary, Alberta, Canada, Enerflex has approximately 5,000 employees and provides natural gas compression, oil and gas processing equipment for sale or lease, refrigeration systems, power generation equipment and field maintenance and contracting. Enerflex, it subsidiaries, interests in affiliates and joint-ventures, operate in Canada, the United States, Argentina, Colombia, Brasil, Mexico, Australia, the United Kingdom, the United Arab Emirates, Kuwait, Oman, Bahrain, and Indonesia.

== See also ==
- Oil well
- Drilling
- OPEC
- List of oil-producing states
