= List of ice hockey teams in Alberta =

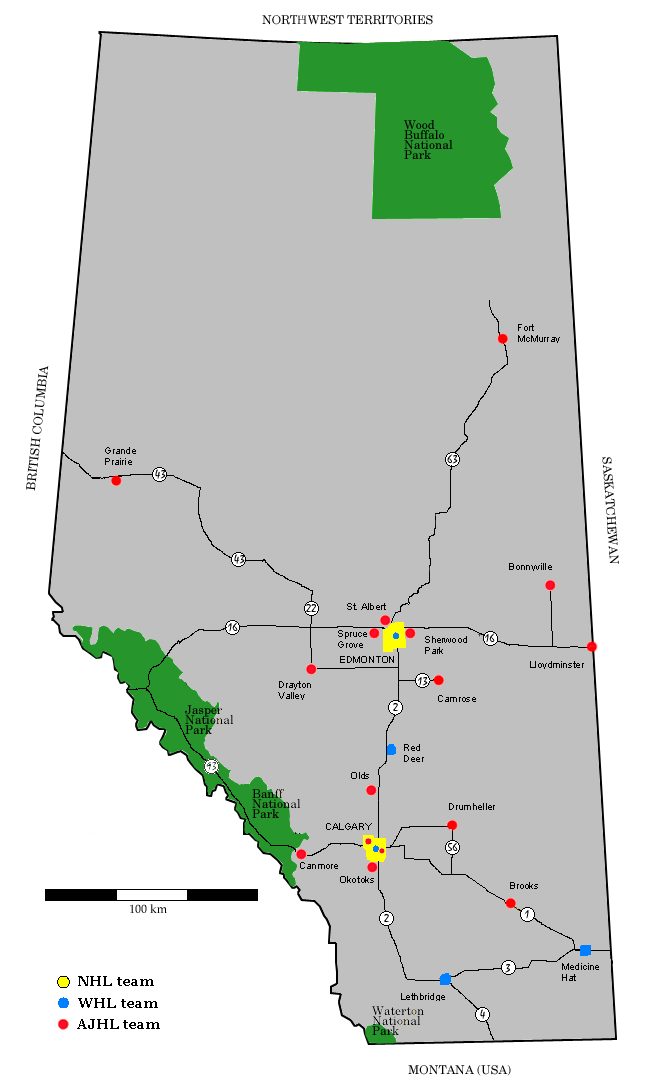
Location of hockey teams in Alberta as of 2007 NHL WHL AJHL

This is a list of ice hockey teams in Alberta. It features the leagues they have played for, and championships won.

Since hockey was introduced to Alberta, Canada, in the 1890s, teams at all levels have come and gone. While the professional ranks have been confined to the major cities of Calgary and Edmonton, partially due to geographical isolation from the major eastern and Pacific coast population centres, both junior and senior teams thrive across the province.

Alberta is home to two National Hockey League teams, five Western Hockey League teams, the 12-team Alberta Junior Hockey League, five British Columbia Hockey League teams, and five Junior B hockey leagues comprising over 50 teams. The Canadian Women's Hockey League is represented in Alberta, as are teams competing at the senior, university and college ranks.

This list does not include teams below the junior age group, or adult teams below Senior AA.

== Major professional ==
=== National Hockey League ===
The Edmonton Oilers became the first National Hockey League team in Alberta as a result of the NHL–WHA merger. The Calgary Flames arrived from Atlanta the following year.

Team	City	Established	Stanley Cups	Notes
Calgary Flames	Calgary	1980	1	Founded in 1972 as the Atlanta Flames
Edmonton Oilers	Edmonton	1979	5	Founded in 1972 as a World Hockey Association franchise

=== Western Canada Hockey League ===
The Western Canada Hockey League was the first major-professional league on the prairies. Founded in 1921, it collapsed due to escalating costs in 1926, and was reformed as the Prairie Hockey League from 1926 to 1928.

Team	City	Existed	League titles	Notes
Calgary Tigers	Calgary	1921–27	2*	Appeared in 1924 Stanley Cup championship
Edmonton Eskimos	Edmonton	1921–27	1	Appeared in 1923 Stanley Cup championship.

*Includes 1926–27 championship after league was renamed the Prairie Hockey League.

=== World Hockey Association ===
The World Hockey Association had envisioned that franchises in Calgary and Edmonton would create an effective rivalry. When the Calgary Broncos were unable to start their inaugural season, the Oilers were briefly renamed the Alberta Oilers with the intention of splitting games between the two cities. This plan failed to materialize.

Team	City	Existed	Avco Cups	Notes
Calgary Broncos	Calgary	1972	0	Original WHA franchise, folded before playing first game
Calgary Cowboys	Calgary	1975–77	0	Founded in 1972 as the Miami Screaming Eagles
Edmonton Oilers	Edmonton	1972–79	0	Known as the Alberta Oilers 1972–73; Joined the National Hockey League in 1979

== Minor professional ==
=== American Hockey League ===
The Edmonton Oilers brought their American Hockey League franchise to the Alberta capital during the 2004–05 NHL lockout season. The team was suspended following the resumption of the NHL, and was eventually reformed as the Oklahoma City Barons. The Calgary Wranglers, the AHL affiliate of the Calgary Flames, play at the same arena.

Team	City	Existed	Calder Cups	Notes
Edmonton Road Runners	Edmonton	2004–05	0	Brought to Edmonton during the 2004–05 NHL lockout.
Calgary Wranglers	Calgary	2022-23	0	Played in Calgary during the 2020-21 AHL season, officially moved to Calgary in May 2022.

=== Western Hockey League ===
The professional Western Hockey League was formed following a merger with the Pacific Coast Hockey League and the Western Canada Senior Hockey League. Both Alberta franchises lost their amateur status when they joined the new league.

Team	City	Existed	Lester Patrick Cups	Notes
Calgary Stampeders	Calgary	1951–63	1	
Edmonton Flyers	Edmonton	1951–63	3	

== Junior ==
=== Western Hockey League ===
The Major-Junior Western Hockey League was formed in 1966 to strengthen junior hockey in the west. The Calgary Buffaloes were the only expansion team, as the other six founding members defected from existing leagues.

Current teams

Team	City	Established	Ed Chynoweth Cups	Memorial Cups	Notes
Calgary Hitmen	Calgary	1995	2	0	
Edmonton Oil Kings	Edmonton	2007	2	1	
Lethbridge Hurricanes	Lethbridge	1987	1	0	Founded in 1967 as the Winnipeg Jets; known as the Calgary Wranglers (1977–87)
Medicine Hat Tigers	Medicine Hat	1970	6	2	
Red Deer Rebels	Red Deer	1992	1	1	

Former teams

Team	City	Existed	President's Cups	Memorial Cups	Notes
Calgary Centennials	Calgary	1966–77	0	0	Known as the Buffaloes in 1966–67; became the Billings Bighorns (1977–82), Nanaimo Islanders (1982–83), New Westminster Bruins (1983–88) and Tri-City Americans (1988–present)
Calgary Wranglers	Calgary	1977–87	0	0	Founded in 1967 as the Winnipeg Jets; became Lethbridge Hurricanes in 1987
Edmonton Oil Kings	Edmonton	1966–76	2	2*	Founding pre-dates WHL; became the Portland Winter Hawks in 1976
Edmonton Oil Kings	Edmonton	1978–79	0	0	Founded in 1967 as the Flin Flon Bombers; became Great Falls Americans (1979) and Spokane Flyers (1980–81)
Edmonton Ice	Edmonton	1996–98	0	0	Became the Kootenay Ice in 1998
Lethbridge Broncos	Lethbridge	1974–86	1	0	Founded in 1967 as the Swift Current Broncos; returned to Swift Current in 1986

*The Oil Kings' two Memorial Cups predate the WHL.

=== Alberta Junior Hockey League ===
The Junior A Alberta Junior Hockey League was founded to improve the level of junior hockey in Alberta, motivated by the dominance of the Edmonton Oil Kings in the early 1960s.

Team	City	Established	League titles	Western Canada Cups	National Championships	Notes
Bonnyville Pontiacs	Bonnyville	1991	0	0	0	
Calgary Canucks	Calgary	1971	9	2	1	
Camrose Kodiaks	Camrose	1997	5	5	1	
Canmore Eagles	Canmore	1995	1	0	0	Known as the Bow Valley Eagles (1995–2001)
Devon Xtreme	Devon	2024	0	0	0	
Drayton Valley Thunder	Drayton Valley	1998	1	0	0	
Drumheller Dragons	Drumheller	2003	0	0	0	
Fort McMurray Oil Barons	Fort McMurray	1981	3	1	1	
Grande Prairie Storm	Grande Prairie	1995	1	0	0	
Lloydminster Bobcats	Lloydminster	1982	0	0	0	Known as the Lloydminster Blazers (1988–2005). The team's arena lies one block on the Saskatchewan side of the biprovincial city.
Olds Grizzlys	Olds	1981	3	1	1	Founded in 1974 as the Taber Golden Suns
Whitecourt Wolverines	Whitecourt	2012	0	0	0	Founded in 1976 as the Fort Saskatchewan Traders; known as the St. Albert Steel (2007–2012)

=== British Columbia Hockey League ===
The British Columbia Hockey League (BCHL) is an independent junior league, not affiliated with Hockey Canada.

Team	City	Established	League titles	Western Canada Cups	National Championships	Notes
Blackfalds Bulldogs	Blackfalds	2021	0	0	0	Founded in 1972 as The Pass Red Devils; known as the Pincher Creek Panthers (1976–1978), the Calgary Chinooks/Spurs (1978–1990), Calgary Royals (1990–2010), and Calgary Mustangs (2010-19). Transferred from AJHL in 2024.
Brooks Bandits	Brooks	2000	1	1	4	Transferred from AJHL in 2024.
Okotoks Oilers	Okotoks	2005	0	0	0	Founded in 1998 as the Crowsnest Pass Timberwolves. Transferred from AJHL in 2024.
Sherwood Park Crusaders	Sherwood Park	1978	0	0	0	Founded in 1976 as the Edmonton Crusaders. Transferred from AJHL in 2024.
Spruce Grove Saints	Spruce Grove	2004	0	0	0	Founded in 1963 as the Edmonton Movers; known as the Spruce Grove Mets (1974–1977) and St. Albert Saints (1977–2004). Transferred from AJHL in 2024.

=== Junior B hockey leagues ===
League	Region	Established	Provincial titles	Keystone Cup titles	Notes
Calgary Junior Hockey League	Calgary	1945	4	1	8 teams
Capital Junior Hockey League	Edmonton region	1972	17	2	14 teams
Heritage Junior B Hockey League	Southern Alberta	1987	3	1	15 teams
North Eastern Alberta Junior B Hockey League	Northeast Alberta	Unknown	5	2	9 teams
Northwest Junior Hockey League	Peace River Country	1995	1	0	7 teams (5 in Alberta)

=== Junior C hockey leagues ===
League	Region	Established	Provincial titles	Notes
Calgary Junior C Hockey League	Calgary	Unknown	N/A	
Noralta Junior Hockey League	Edmonton region	Unknown	N/A	

=== Junior female ===
The Alberta Junior Female Hockey League was founded in 2009 to promote female junior hockey for players aged 18–21 in Alberta. The league has grown from its original 6 team to 10 teams throughout the province.

Team	City	Established	Titles	Notes
Banff Academy Bears	Banff	2012	0	The Banff Academy Bears played in the AJFHL until the end of the 2013/14 season as a conditional team as they were a midget academy team.
Calgary Titans	Calgary	2010	0	
Calgary Warriors	Calgary	2012	0	
Central Alberta Amazons	Red Deer	2009	1	
Cremona/Mountain View Hurricanes	Cremona/Mountain View	2010	0	Folded in 2012 due a lack of players
Edmonton Wolves	Edmonton	2009	2	
Fort Saskatchewan Fury	Fort Saskatchewan	2009	1	
Irma Chargers	Irma	2009	0	
Lethbridge Jr. Eagles	Lethbridge	2012	1	
Medicine Hat Hockey Hounds	Medicine Hat	2012	0	
Sherwood Park Steele	Sherwood Park	2009	0	
Spruce Grove Stars	Spruce Grove	2009	0	Moved to Thorsby in 2011
Thorsby Thunder	Thorsby	2011 *	0	Founded as the Spruce Grove Stars, moved to Thorsby in 2011
Wainwright	Wainwright	2009	0	

== Semi-professional, senior and amateur ==
=== Women's hockey teams ===
Both of Alberta's elite women's teams were invited to join the National Women's Hockey League (NWHL) in 2002. In 2004, they broke away to form the Western Women's Hockey League (WWHL) due to the lack of competition in the west. They returned to the NWHL in 2006 following a merger between the two leagues. However, due to circumstances arising over scheduling between the WWHL and the NWHL, the merger was never completed. This, coupled with the collapse of the NWHL in 2007, left the Oval X-Treme and Chimos as members of the WWHL. The league announced on April 19, 2011, that it would merge with the Canadian Women's Hockey League (CWHL) for the 2011–12 season. The merger was to feature one team based in Edmonton and Calgary and is a combination of the former WWHL franchises, the Edmonton Chimos and Strathmore Rockies, with games in various locations around Alberta. In August 2011, the WWHL announced that there had never officially been a merger and that the WWHL would continue to compete against the CWHL, but the WWHL never played another game. Team Alberta commenced play in the CWHL in 2011 before taking on the identity of the Calgary Inferno in 2013. The CWHL and the Inferno ceased operations in 2019.

Team	City	Established	Titles	Notes
Calgary Inferno	Calgary	2011–2019	2	CWHL member known as Team Alberta from 2011 to 2013. Won the 2016 and 2019 Clarkson Cup.
Calgary Oval X-Treme	Calgary	2002–2009	5	Members of the NWHL 2002–2004 and WWHL 2004–2009. Club founded in 1995 and joined the NWHL in 2002.
Edmonton Chimos	Edmonton	2002–2011	0	Members of the NWHL 2002–04 and WWHL 2004–2011. Club founded in 1973 and joined the NWHL in 2002.
Strathmore Rockies	Strathmore	2006–2011	0	WWHL member from 2006 to 2011.

=== Senior ===
Several teams from Alberta have gone on to capture the Allan Cup, Canada's national senior championship.

Team	City	Existence	Allan Cups	Notes
Calgary Stampeders	Calgary	1938–1951	1	Turned professional in 1951 by joining the WPHL
Drumheller Miners	Drumheller	1936–1939, 1960s	1	
Edmonton Flyers	Edmonton	1941–1951	1	Turned professional in 1951 by joining the WPHL
Edmonton Mercurys	Edmonton	Unknown		Won 1950 World Hockey Championship and 1952 Olympic gold medal
Lloydminster Border Kings	Lloydminster	unknown–present	1	Member of the Wild Goose Hockey League
Stony Plain Eagles	Stony Plain	1930s–present	1	Member of the Chinook Hockey League
Nanton Palominos	Nanton	1930s–present	0	Member of the Ranchland Hockey League
Bonnyville Pontiacs	Bonnyville	1952–present	0	Member of the North Central Senior Hockey League
Bentley Generals	Bentley	1999–present	2	Member of the Chinook Hockey League

=== University ===
The Canada West Universities Athletic Association was founded in 1919, representing schools across Western Canada.

Team	City	Established	Conference titles	University Cups	Women's Titles	Notes
Alberta Golden Bears	Edmonton	1913	53	15	7	
Calgary Dinos	Calgary	1964	8	0	0	Women's Hockey team played in ACAC from 2002–03 to 2008–09
Lethbridge Pronghorns	Lethbridge	1980	1	1	0	

=== College ===
The Alberta Colleges Athletics Conference organizes sport at the collegiate level.

Team	City	Established	ACAC men's titles	CCAA men's national titles	ACAC women's titles	Notes
Augustana Vikings	Camrose	1971	1	1	N/A	Does not play ACAC women's hockey, only men's
Calgary Dinos	Calgary				1	Women's Hockey team played in ACAC from 2002–03 to 2008–09
Concordia Thunder	Edmonton	1992	1	0	0	
MacEwan Gryphons	Edmonton	1998	1	0	1	
Mount Royal Cougars	Calgary	1968	11	4	4	
NAIT Ooks	Edmonton	1965	13	7	0	
Portage Voyageurs	Lac La Biche	2008	0	0		Does not play ACAC women's hockey, only men's
Red Deer Queens	Red Deer				2	Does not play ACAC men's hockey, only women's
SAIT Trojans	Calgary	1965	9	2	2	

== League, regional and national championships ==
Teams from Alberta have captured titles at all levels of hockey.

Championship	Times won	Description
Stanley Cup	6	National Hockey League champion
WCHL Championship	3^{†}	Western Canada Hockey League champion
Lester Patrick Cup	4	Western Hockey League champion
President's Cup	11	Western Hockey League champion
Memorial Cup	6	Canadian Major-Junior national champion
Allan Cup	4^{‡}	Canadian senior national champion
Doyle Cup	24	Alberta/B.C. Junior "A" regional championship
Royal Bank Cup	7	Canadian Junior "A" national champion
Keystone Cup	8	Western Canada Junior "B" champion
NWHL Championship Cup	2	National Women's Hockey League championship
WWHL Championship Cup	3	Western Women's Hockey League championship
University Cup	16	CIS national men's university champion
CIS Women's Championship	7	CIS national women's university champion
CCHA Championship	14	CCAA national college champion

^{†}Includes Calgary's 1926-27 title after league renamed itself the Prairie Hockey League
^{‡}Does not include win by Lloydminster Border Kings as team is primarily based in Saskatchewan

== See also ==
- Hockey Alberta
- Ice hockey at the 1988 Winter Olympics
- Ice hockey in Calgary
