= 2024–25 AJHL season =

Alberta Junior Hockey League season

- League: Alberta Junior Hockey League
- Sport: Ice hockey
- Duration: Preseason; August - September; Regular season September - March; Postseason; March - April
- Games: 324
- Teams: 12
- Total attendance: 231,940

League championship
- Inter Pipeline Cup: Calgary Canucks
- Runners-up: Grande Prairie Storm

National championship
- Champions: Calgary Canucks
- Runners-up: Melfort Mustangs

AJHL seasons
- ← 2023–24 2025–26 →

The 2024–25 AJHL season was the 61st season of the Alberta Junior Hockey League (AJHL). Competition began on 24 August 2024 with a 35-game exhibition season, followed by a 54-game regular season which ran from 13 September 2024 to 15 March 2025. The Calgary Canucks finished the regular season in first place overall, and went on to win the AJHL championship Inter Pipeline Cup and the national championship 2025 Centennial Cup. The Canucks hosted the national championship as well as the 2024 AJHL showcase.

Whitecourt Wolverines goaltender, Zac Onyskiw, was named most valuable player by the AJHL and the CJHL. The CJHL is made up of nine Junior A leagues (including the AJHL) from across Canada. Onyskiw finished the regular season with a 1.87 goals against average (GAA) and a save percentage of .939. Onyskiw and his teammate, Elliott Pratt, received the AJHL's top team goaltenders award, which is presented every year to the goalies whose team has the lowest GAA in the regular season. Pratt had a GAA of 2.56 and a .911 save percentage. The Wolverines finished the regular season with an overall GAA of 2.29.

Drumheller Dragons forward, Easton Daneault, was named rookie of the year by both the AJHL and the CJHL.

The league extended its pilot program of video goal review in select arenas that began in the 2023–24 season.

The governing body, Hockey Canada, and its four western regional affiliates – BC Hockey, Hockey Alberta, Hockey Saskatchewan and Hockey Manitoba – will pilot the Western Canadian Development Model (WCDM). Under the WCDM, junior leagues will adopt most of the Western Hockey League rulebook, excluding some sections, and restrictions on 15-year-old affiliate players in the Western Hockey League will be loosened. Players that will be 18-years of age or older in the calendar year will be allowed to choose whether to use full-face protection or half-face protection, whilst younger players will be required to use full-face protection.

The Devon Xtreme joined the league as an expansion team, bringing the total number of teams to 12. The team plays its home games in the Dale Fisher Arena, which opened in September 2024. The team hired Kelly Buchberger to be its general manager and head coach.

Similar to in years past, teams were organized into a North Division and a South Division. The surprise mid-season departure of five teams during the 2023–24 season — namely the Sherwood Park Crusaders and Spruce Grove Saints from the North Division and the Blackfalds Bulldogs, Brooks Bandits and Okotoks Oilers from the South Division — led to the consolidation of what was left of the divisions into a single unit for the remainder of the season. The updated divisional structure for this season is as follows:

Map of AJHL teams
⬤ North division
⬤ South division

Teams
Division	Team	Home	Arena
North	Bonnyville Pontiacs	Bonnyville	R. J. Lalonde Arena
North	Devon Xtreme	Devon	Dale Fisher Arena
North	Fort McMurray Oil Barons	Fort McMurray	Centerfire Place
North	Grande Prairie Storm	Grande Prairie	Bonnetts Energy Centre
North	Lloydminster Bobcats	Lloydminster	Centennial Civic Centre
North	Whitecourt Wolverines	Whitecourt	Scott Safety Centre
South	Calgary Canucks	Calgary	Ken Bracko Arena
South	Camrose Kodiaks	Camrose	EnCana Arena
South	Canmore Eagles	Canmore	Canmore Recreation Centre
South	Drayton Valley Thunder	Drayton Valley	Drayton Valley Omni-Plex
South	Drumheller Dragons	Drumheller	Drumheller Memorial Arena
South	Olds Grizzlys	Olds	Olds & District Sports Complex

== Pre-season ==
A 35-game exhibition season ran from 24 August to 7 September 2024.

== Regular season ==
Teams played six matches against each of the teams in their division and four matches against each of the teams in the other division. The regular season schedule included 12 games played as part of the 2024 AJHL Showcase, an event that brings all of the teams to the host city to play in front of an audience of coaches and scouts from the NHL, CHL and collegiate institutions. It was the 18th annual showcase and it took place from 25 to 27 September 2024 in Calgary.

North division
Rank	Team	GP	W	L	OTL	SOL	Pts
1	Whitecourt Wolverines	54	36	12	3	3	78
2	Grande Prairie Storm	54	30	17	1	6	67
3	Lloydminster Bobcats	54	31	19	1	3	66
4	Fort McMurray Oil Barons	54	24	26	3	1	52
5	Bonnyville Pontiacs	54	20	30	1	3	44
6	Devon Xtreme	54	11	39	2	2	26

Source: "2024-25 Alberta Junior Hockey League standings". hockeydb.com.

South division
Rank	Team	GP	W	L	OTL	SOL	Pts
1	Calgary Canucks	54	37	13	2	2	78
2	Canmore Eagles	54	35	12	5	2	77
3	Drumheller Dragons	54	30	16	3	5	68
4	Camrose Kodiaks	54	32	18	4	0	68
5	Drayton Valley Thunder	54	23	24	4	3	53
6	Olds Grizzlys	54	15	38	1	0	31

Source: "2024-25 Alberta Junior Hockey League standings". hockeydb.com.

== Post-season ==
2025 League championship
Inter Pipeline Cup

Tournament details
- Dates: 21 March – 23 April
- Teams: 8
- Defending champions: Calgary Canucks

Final positions
- Champions: Calgary Canucks
- Runners-up: Grande Prairie Storm
- Semifinalists: Drumheller Dragons; Whitecourt Wolverines

Tournament statistics
- Games played: 33
- Goals scored: 235 (7.12 per game)
- Attendance: 37,643 (1,141 per game)

Official website
- 2025 AJHL playoffs

At the end of the regular season, the top 4 teams from each division competed in the post-season for the league championship Inter Pipeline Cup. The format consisted of three play-off rounds. In the first and second rounds, teams competed within their respective divisions. The winners in each round were determined by a best-of-7 series, with the winners advancing to the next round, and the losers being eliminated from competition.

Quarterfinals
Grande Prairie Storm	4
Lloydminster Bobcats	0
Whitecourt Wolverines	4
Fort McMurray Oil Barons	1
Drumheller Dragons	4
Canmore Eagles	3
Camrose Kodiaks	1
Calgary Canucks	4

Semifinals
Grande Prairie Storm	4
Whitecourt Wolverines	0
Drumheller Dragons	0
Calgary Canucks	4

Finals
Grande Prairie Storm	0
Calgary Canucks	4

Source: "2024–25 AJHL playoff results". hockeydb.com.

=== Quarterfinal: Grande Prairie Storm v. Lloydminster Bobcats ===
The second-place Grande Prairie Storm swept the third-pace Lloydminster Bobcats in four games to advance to the semifinal.

21 March	Lloydminster Bobcats	3-7	Grande Prairie Storm	Bonnetts Energy Centre	Recap
No scoring		First period	1 - 08:33; 2 - 19:16 shorthanded
power play06:13 - 1 power play18:26 - 2		Second period	3 - 01:12; 4 - 03:58
power play11:02 - 3		Third period	5 - 01:08; 6 - 06:52; 7 - 17:02

22 March	Lloydminster Bobcats	2-8	Grande Prairie Storm	Bonnetts Energy Centre	Recap
17:21 - 1		First period	1 - 08:50
01:02 - 2		Second period	2 - 11:22; 3 - 12:11; 4 - 12:29; 5 - 14:41 power play 6 - 18:25
No scoring		Third period	7 - 08:25; 8 - 19:05 power play

25 March	Grande Prairie Storm	2-1	Lloydminster Bobcats	Centennial Civic Centre Arena	Recap
No scoring		First period	No scoring
power play 16:26 - 1		Second period	No scoring
power play 11:41 - 2		Third period	1 - 04:28

26 March	Grande Prairie Storm	4-3	Lloydminster Bobcats	Centennial Civic Centre Arena	Recap
16:15 - 1; 17:44 - 2		First period	1 - 06:54
10:28 - 3		Second period	2 - 10:18
13:23 - 4		Third period	3 - 17:25

Grande Prairie Storm wins 4-0

=== Quarterfinal: Whitecourt Wolverines v. Fort McMurray Oil Barons ===
The first-place Whitecourt Wolverines defeated the fourth-place Fort McMurray Oil Barons in 4 games to 1 to advance to the semifinal.

21 March	Fort McMurray Oil Barons	2-3	Whitecourt Wolverines	JDA Place	Recap
No scoring		First period	1 - 15:08
01:16 - 1		Second period	2 - 03:51; 3 - 14:29
power play 08:58 - 2		Third period	No scoring

22 March	Fort McMurray Oil Barons	3-2	Whitecourt Wolverines	JDA Place	Recap
07:07 - 1		First period	1 - 08:45
power play 00:45 - 2		Second period	2 - 05:07 power play
08:25 - 3		Third period	No scoring

25 March	Whitecourt Wolverines	4-1	Fort McMurray Oil Barons	Centerfire Place	Recap
07:45 - 1		First period	No scoring
No scoring		Second period	No scoring
02:34 - 2; 02:43 - 3 power play 16:12 - 4		Third period	1 - 14:46

26 March	Whitecourt Wolverines	4-2	Fort McMurray Oil Barons	Centerfire Place	Recap
power play 08:16 - 1		First period	1 - 13:47
08:38 - 2		Second period	No scoring
01:18 - 3 empty net 19:34 - 4		Third period	2 - 09:01

28 March	Fort McMurray Oil Barons	1-2	OT	Whitecourt Wolverines	JDA Place	Recap
No scoring		First period		No scoring
No scoring		Second period		1 - 13:09
power play 13:09 - 1		Third period		No scoring
No scoring		First overtime period		2 - 03:49

Whitecourt Wolverines win 4-1

=== Quarterfinal: Drumheller Dragons v. Canmore Eagles ===
The third-place Drumheller Dragons eliminated the second-place Canmore Eagles in 7 games to advance to the semifinal.

21 March	Drumheller Dragons	11-2	Canmore Eagles	Canmore Recreation Centre	Recap
12:30 - 1		First period	1 - 14:12
02:28 - 2 power play 09:49 - 3 power play 13:07 - 4 shorthanded 14:07 - 5; 16:13 - 6; 17:12 - 7		Second period	No scoring
01:34 - 8; 06:55 - 9; 07:48 - 10; 12:03 - 11		Third period	2 - 07:10

22 March	Drumheller Dragons	2-5	Canmore Eagles	Canmore Recreation Centre	Recap
No scoring		First period	1 - 01:45; 2 - 07:40; 3 - 14:59
05:39 - 1		Second period	4 - 00:23
14:18 - 2		Third period	5 - 12:57

25 March	Canmore Eagles	1-3	Drumheller Dragons	Drumheller Memorial Arena	Recap
No scoring		First period	No scoring
No scoring		Second period	No scoring
03:45 - 1		Third period	1 - 07:32 power play 2 - 10:38 power play 3 - 18:41 empty net

26 March	Canmore Eagles	3-1	Drumheller Dragons	Drumheller Memorial Arena	Recap
01:38 - 1		First period	1 - 09:21
05:31 - 2; 12:33 - 3		Second period	No scoring
No scoring		Third period	No scoring

28 March	Drumheller Dragons	2-1	Canmore Eagles	Canmore Recreation Centre	Recap
power play 10:45 - 1		First period	No scoring
No scoring		Second period	1 - 15:31
power play 05:20 - 2		Third period	No scoring

30 March	Canmore Eagles	6-3	Drumheller Dragons	Drumheller Memorial Arena	Recap
01:02 - 1; 09:05 - 2 power play 19:37 - 3		First period	No scoring
16:05 - 4		Second period	1 - 14:45 power play
01:34 - 5 empty net 18:17 - 6		Third period	2 - 17:16; 3 - 18:40

1 April	Drumheller Dragons	4-1	Canmore Eagles	Canmore Recreation Centre	Recap
10:53 - 1		First period	1 - 19:46 power play
power play 19:39 - 2		Second period	No scoring
13:41 - 3 empty net 18:44 - 4		Third period	No scoring

Drumheller Dragons win 4-3

=== Quarterfinal: Camrose Kodiaks v. Calgary Canucks ===
The first-place Calgary Canucks defeated the fourth-place Camrose Kodiaks in five games to one to advance to the semifinal.

21 March	Camrose Kodiaks	2-4	Calgary Canucks	Ken Bracko Arena	Recap
19:14 - 1		First period	No scoring
12:17 - 2		Second period	1 - 03:10
No scoring		Third period	2 - 10:07; 3 - 11:20; 4 - 18:52 empty net

22 March	Camrose Kodiaks	4-9	Calgary Canucks	Ken Bracko Arena	Recap
No scoring		First period	1 - 03:28 power play 2 - 07:25; 3 - 09:00; 4 - 18:43
power play 15:48 - 1 power play 19:16 - 2		Second period	5 - 11:56
power play 16:14 - 3; 17:46 - 4		Third period	6 - 02:24; 7 - 14:35 power play 8 - 15:47; 9 - 16:52

25 March	Calgary Canucks	4-5	Camrose Kodiaks	Encana Arena	Recap
No scoring		First period	1 - 11:21; 2 - 12:15; 3 - 19:59
02:17 - 1; 04:05 - 2		Second period	4 - 07:29 power play 5 - 19:46
power play 07:44 - 3; 19:25 - 4		Third period	No scoring

26 March	Calgary Canucks	5-2	Camrose Kodiaks	Encana Arena	Recap
13:43 - 1		First period	1 - 10:13; 2 - 13:04 power play
02:18 - 2		Second period	No scoring
03:28 - 3; 13:51 - 4; 15:37 - 5		Third period	No scoring

28 March	Camrose Kodiaks	2-5	Calgary Canucks	Ken Bracko Arena	Recap
04:57 - 1; 10:30 - 2		First period	1 - 10:58 power play 2 - 17:57
No scoring		Second period	3 - 14:32
No scoring		Third period	4 - 03:30; 5 - 18:48 empty net

Calgary Canucks win 4-1

=== Semifinal: Grande Prairie Storm v. Whitecourt Wolverines ===
The Grande Prairie Storm, after finishing the regular season in 2nd place in the North division, swept the first-place Whitecourt Wolverines to advance to the final.

4 April	Grande Prairie Storm	4-1	Whitecourt Wolverines	JDA Place	Recap
11:30 - 1; 18:58 - 2		First period	No scoring
No scoring		Second period	1 - 19:43
01:22 - 3; 19:52 - 4		Third period	No scoring

5 April	Grande Prairie Storm	2-0	Whitecourt Wolverines	JDA Place	Recap
18:45 - 1		First period	No scoring
No scoring		Second period	No scoring
16:50 - 2		Third period	No scoring

7 April	Whitecourt Wolverines	3-4	Grande Prairie Storm	Bonnetts Energy Centre	Recap
19:40 - 1		First period	1 - 10:15; 2 - 13:54 power play
11:05 - 2		Second period	3 - 17:23
12:21 - 3		Third period	4 - 03:07 shorthanded

8 April	Whitecourt Wolverines	5-6	OT	Grande Prairie Storm	Bonnetts Energy Centre	Recap
12:34 - 1; 14:09 - 2		First period		1 - 15:02; 2 - 17:24
04:57 - 3		Second period		3 - 14:50 power play
06:19 - 4 power play 15:25 - 5		Third period		4 - 01:42; 5 - 06:38
No scoring		First overtime period		6 - 00:17 power play

Grande Prairie Storm win 4-0

=== Semifinal: Drumheller Dragons v. Calgary Canucks ===
The Calgary Canucks swept the Drumheller Dragons in four games to advance to the final round.

4 April	Drumheller Dragons	3-4	Calgary Canucks	Ken Bracko Arena	Recap
No scoring		First period	1 - 01:02
power play 09:13 - 1		Second period	2 - 08:00; 3 - 11:53 power play
05:29 - 2 power play 09:23 - 3		Third period	4 - 15:19

5 April	Drumheller Dragons	2-6	Calgary Canucks	Ken Bracko Arena	Recap
power play 13:33 - 1		First period	1 - 02:21 power play 2 - 07:23; 3 - 07:57; 4 - 15:38 power play
No scoring		Second period	5 - 01:25 power play 6 - 15:16
shorthanded 12:58 - 2		Third period	No scoring

8 April	Calgary Canucks	3-1	Drumheller Dragons	Drumheller Memorial Arena	Recap
02:40 - 1		First period	No scoring
16:19 - 2		Second period	1 - 12:42 power play
shorthanded 14:59 - 3		Third period	No scoring

9 April	Calgary Canucks	5-2	Drumheller Dragons	Drumheller Memorial Arena	Recap
No scoring		First period	No scoring
03:30 - 1; 09:43 - 2		Second period	1 - 08:36 power play
04:14 - 3 power play 08:28 - 4 empty net19:38 - 5		Third period	2 - 17:16

Calgary Canucks win 4-0

=== Final: Grande Prairie Storm v. Calgary Canucks ===
18 April	Grande Prairie Storm	3-9	Calgary Canucks	Ken Bracko Arena	Recap
00:23 - 1; 12:46 - 2		First period	1 - 13:25; 2 - 19:45
No scoring		Second period	3 - 00:50; 4 - 02:39 power play 5 - 05:42
power play 13:20 - 3		Third period	6 - 10:59 power play 7 - 12:07 power play 8 - 16:27 shorthanded 9 - 19:59

19 April	Grande Prairie Storm	4-6	Calgary Canucks	Ken Bracko Arena	Recap
07:53 - 1		First period	No scoring
04:36 - 2 power play 18:11 - 3		Second period	1 - 11:23
17:58 - 4		Third period	2 - 01:34 power play 3 - 03:01; 4 - 08:43; 5 - 15:21 power play 6 - 19:25 empty net

22 April	Calgary Canucks	7-4	Grande Prairie Storm	Bonnetts Energy Centre	Recap
01:25 - 1 power play 05:44 - 2; 15:44 - 3; 19:06 - 4		First period	1 - 00:18; 2 - 04:17 power play 3 - 12:58 power play
power play 11:45 - 5		Second period	4 - 07:41 power play
01:51 - 6; 05:08 - 7		Third period	No scoring

23 April	Calgary Canucks	7-3	Grande Prairie Storm	Bonnetts Energy Centre	Recap
01:36 - 1; 09:14 - 2; 16:42 - 3		First period	1 - 08:15; 2 - 18:38
01:34 - 4; 04:19 - 5; 16:11 - 6		Second period	3 - 05:55
09:11 - 7		Third period	No scoring

Calgary Canucks win 4-0

== National championship ==
2025 National championship
Centennial Cup
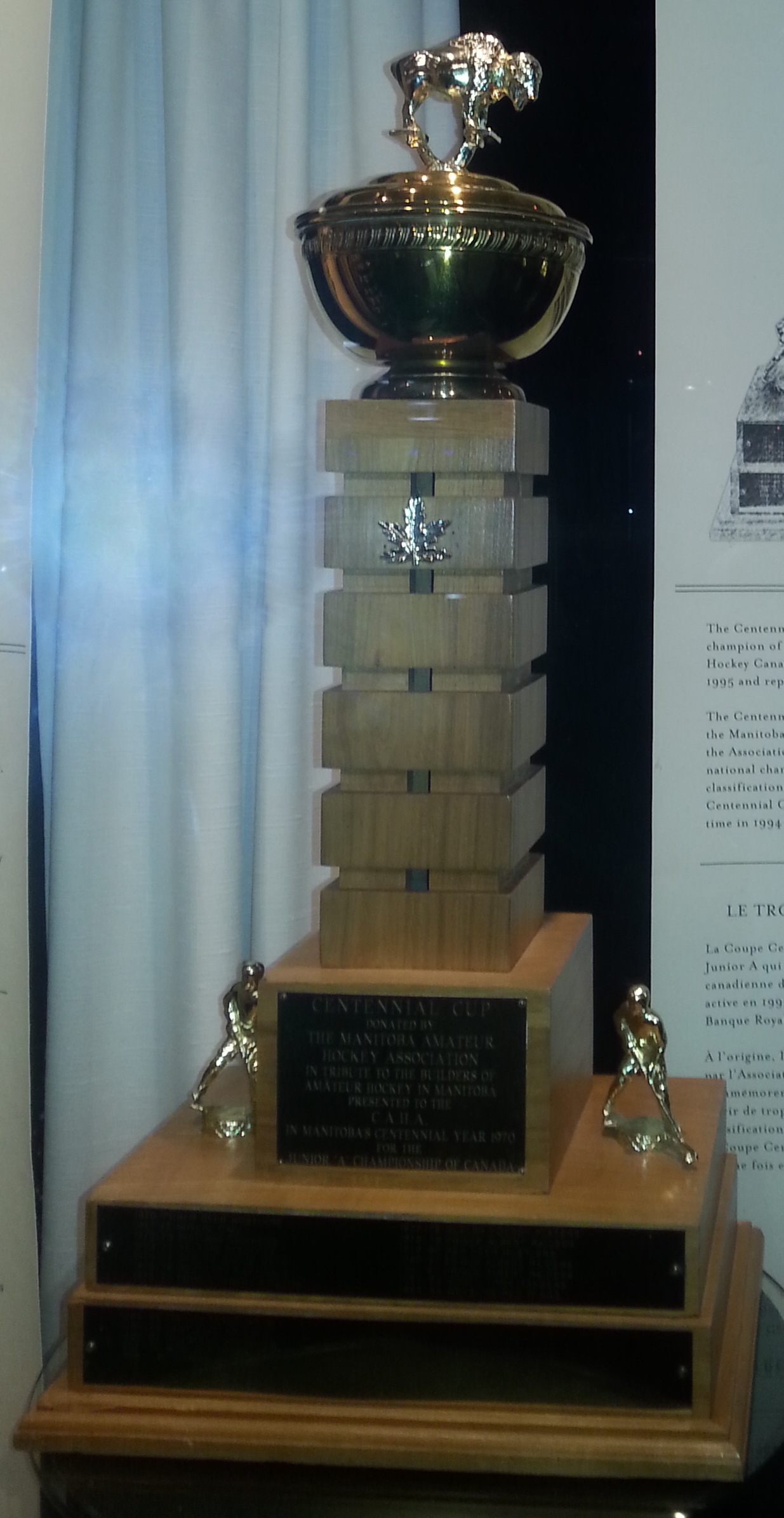

Tournament details
- Cities: Calgary, Alberta
- Venue: Max Bell Centre
- Dates: 8–18 May 2025
- Teams: 10
- Host team: Calgary Canucks

Final positions
- Champions: Calgary Canucks
- Runners-up: Melfort Mustangs
- Semifinalists: Rockland Nationals; Trenton Golden Hawks

Tournament statistics
- Games played: 25
- Goals scored: 189 (7.56 per game)

Official website
- Hockey Canada

The 54th annual Junior A national championship tournament was hosted by the Calgary Canucks at the Max Bell Centre in Calgary, and included the championship teams from the 9 leagues that collectively make up the Canadian Junior Hockey League (CJHL). The AJHL was represented by the Canucks and Grande Prairie Storm. The Canucks defeated the Melfort Mustangs of the Saskatchewan Junior Hockey League to win the championship. The 2025 Centennial Cup National Junior A Champsionship tournament was hosted by the Calgary Canucks.

=== Round robin ===
Each team played each other team in their group once during the round robin phase. Three points were awarded for a win in regulation time, two points for a win in overtime or shootout, one point for a loss in overtime or shootout, and no points were awarded for a loss in regulation time.

	Group A	TGH	NMB	GSC	GPS	KRF
1	Trenton Golden Hawks		5-4	5-2	6-2	1-2
2	Northern Manitoba Blizzard	4-5		6-3	6-3	3-2
3	Greater Sudbury Cubs	2-5	3-6		6-2	2-1
4	Grande Prairie Storm	2-6	3-6	2-6		3-1
5	Kam River Fighting Walleye	2-1	2-3	1-2	1-3	

	Group B	CC	MM	RN	EB	VB
1	Calgary Canucks		3-1	2-7	8-2	11-6
2	Melfort Mustangs	1-3		5-2	5-3	5-4
3	Rockland Nationals	7-2	2-5		3-4	9-4
4	Edmunston Blizzard	2-8	3-5	4-3		7-2
5	Valleyfield Braves	6-11	4-5	4-9	2-7	

=== Playoffs ===
Based on the results of the preliminary round robin, the quarterfinals included the Northern Manitoba Blizzard against the Rockland Nationals; and the Melfort Mustangs against the Greater Sudbury Cubs. The Nationals defeated the Blizzard, 4–0, and the Mustangs defeated the Cubs, 7–1.

The Trenton Golden Hawks and the Calgary Canucks, who placed first in their respective groups, had a bye in the quarterfinal round and advanced to the semifinals. The Canucks faced the Nationals, and the Golden Hawks faced the Mustangs. The Canucks had previously lost to the Nationals by a score of 7–2 in the preliminary round. By the 2nd period of the semifinal, the Nationals were winning, 2–0, and by the end of 3rd period, the score was tied, 2-2. The Canucks scored the game-winning goal in overtime to advance to the final.

The final was between the Canucks and the Mustangs. Notably, it was the Mustangs who eliminated the Canucks at the 2024 Centennial Cup in the semifinal, before losing in the final. This time, however, the Canucks defeated the Mustangs, 7–2, to win the championship Centennial Cup.

Quarterfinals
Northern Manitoba Blizzard	0
Rockland Nationals	4
Melfort Mustangs	7
Greater Sudbury Cubs	1

Semifinals
Rockland Nationals	2
Calgary Canucks	3
Trenton Golden Hawks	3
Melfort Mustangs	4

Finals
Calgary Canucks	7
Melfort Mustangs	2

Source: "2025 Centennial Cup schedule & results". hockeycanada.ca. Hockey Canada.

== See also ==
- 2024 in ice hockey
- 2025 in ice hockey
- Centennial Cup
