= 2023–24 AJHL season =

Alberta Junior Hockey League season

- League: Alberta Junior Hockey League
- Sport: Ice hockey
- Duration: Preseason; August - September; Regular season September - March; Post-season; March - April
- Games: 57
- Teams: 16 (August-January); 11 (February-April)

Regular season
- Season champions: Whitecourt Wolverines
- Season MVP: Luka Sukovic (Bonnyville Pontiacs)
- Top scorer: Caden Cabana (Lloydminster Bobcats)

Post-season
- Post-season MVP: Ty Hipkin (Canucks)
- Finals champions: Calgary Canucks
- Runners-up: Whitecourt Wolverines

AJHL seasons
- ← 2022–23 2024–25 →

The 2023–24 AJHL season was the 60th season of the Alberta Junior Hockey League (AJHL). The season began with 16 teams and ended with 11 teams after the surprise mid-season departure of five teams to join the BCHL. The Calgary Canucks swept the Whitecourt Wolverines in 4 games to win the league championship.

== League changes ==
The season began with 16 teams distributed between 2 divisions of 8 teams each. On January 20, 2024, the British Columbia Hockey League (BCHL) announced that the Blackfalds Bulldogs, Brooks Bandits, Okotoks Oilers, Sherwood Park Crusaders, and Spruce Grove Saints would move from the AJHL to the BCHL in the 2024-25 season. The BCHL had planned to wait until the end of the season to make the announcement, however rumours had already begun to circulate online. The AJHL responded to the announcement by cancelling most of the five teams' remaining scheduled matches except those between each other. It was then decided by the BCHL that the five teams would play out the rest of the season as a stand-alone division under the aegis of the BCHL. The AJHL then consolidated the remaining teams from its North and South divisions into a single unit for the rest of the season.

The league began a pilot program for video review on goals at specific arenas. It subsequently decided to extend the pilot program through the 2024–25 season.

== Regular season ==
Map of AJHL, 2023–24
North Division, team played full season
North Division, team joined BCHL in January
South Division, team played full season
South Division, team joined BCHL in January

The standings at the end of the regular season were as follows:

Standings
Team	GP	W	L	OTL	SOL	Pts
Whitecourt Wolverines	57	34	18	4	1	73
Lloydminster Bobcats	57	33	24	0	0	66
Calgary Canucks	57	31	23	1	2	65
Bonnyville Pontiacs	57	30	23	4	0	64
Drumheller Dragons	57	26	23	5	3	60
Grande Prairie Storm	57	24	26	4	3	55
Canmore Eagles	57	25	29	2	1	53
Camrose Kodiaks	57	22	28	0	7	51
Drayton Valley Thunder	57	19	35	2	1	41
Fort McMurray Oil Barons	57	17	34	3	3	40
Olds Grizzlys	57	10	41	3	3	26

Note: GP = Games Played, W = Wins, L = Losses, OTL = Overtime Losses, SOL = Shootout losses, Pts = Points

Source: "2022-23 Alberta Junior Hockey League [AJHL] standings". hockeydb.com.

== Scoring leaders ==
GP = Games Played, G = Goals, A = Assists, P = Points, PIM = Penalties In Minutes

Player	Team	GP	G	A	Pts	PIM
Caden Cabana	Lloydminster Bobcats	53	27	42	69	38
Colby Browne	Whitecourt Wolverines	57	26	42	68	44
Luka Sukovic	Bonnyville Pontiacs	57	35	32	67	42
Bowden Singleton	Calgary Canucks	56	21	46	67	32
Ben Aucoin	Lloydminster Bobcats	57	32	31	63	40
Travis Verbeek	Whitecourt Wolverines	55	28	32	60	38
Alex Atwill	Grande Prairie Storm	57	23	35	58	30
Nicolas Beaudoin	Bonnyville Pontiacs	54	23	33	56	32
Adam Grenier	Drayton Valley Thunder	55	22	34	56	62
Blake Setter	Lloydminster Bobcats	56	24	30	54	38

== Leading goaltenders ==
Note: GP = Games Played, W = Wins, L = Losses, OTL = Overtime Losses, SOL = Shootout Losses, GA = Goals Against, Sv% = Save Percentage, GAA = Goals Against Average, SO = Shutouts, Mins = Minutes played.

Player	Team	GP	W	L	OTL	SOL	GA	Sv%	GAA	SO	Mins
Ben Charette	Whitecourt Wolverines	34	20	9	4	1	79	0.925	2.40	4	1,974
Sean Cootes	Drayton Valley Thunder	26	11	6	3	2	57	0.910	2.43	3	1,406
Julian Molinaro	Calgary Canucks	45	27	16	1	1	115	0.916	2.60	6	2,650
Nicholas Jones	Grande Prairie Storm	38	16	17	2	2	101	0.907	2.71	1	2,237
Chazz Nixon	Drayton Valley Thunder	19	8	9	1	0	51	0.920	2.77	1	1,105

== Post-season ==
1st round
Whitecourt	4
Camrose	1
Lloydminster	2
Canmore	4
Calgary	4
Grande Prairie	2
Bonnyville	0
Drumheller	4

Semifinals
Whitecourt	4
Canmore	3
Calgary	4
Drumheller	1

Finals
Whitecourt	0
Calgary	4

=== Quarterfinal: Whitecourt Wolverines vs. Camrose Kodiaks ===
March 15	Whitecourt Wolverines	3 – 2	Camrose Kodiaks	JDA Place
11:05 - Shayne Tibbles (1)		First period	Sam Lozinski (1) - 17:55
10:56 - Kyle Venneman (1)		Second period	No scoring
8:42 - Colby Browne (1)		Third period	Ty Hodge (1) - 11:40
Lukas Renaud (28 saves / 30 shots)		Goalie stats	Elliott Pratt (30 saves / 33 shots)

March 16	Whitecourt Wolverines	3 – 2	OT	Camrose Kodiaks	JDA Place
No scoring		First period		Levi Carter (1) - 4:55
3:35 - Braden Keeble (1)		Second period		Carter Matthews (1) - 15:21
4:11 - pp - Travis Verbeek (1)		Third period		No scoring
7:10 - Jarred Feist (1)		First overtime period		No scoring
Nick Avakyan (28 saves / 30 shots)		Goalie stats		Elliott Pratt (43 saves / 46 shots)

March 19	Camrose Kodiaks	1 – 5	Whitecourt Wolverines	EnCana Arena
No scoring		First period	No scoring
No scoring		Second period	Nathaniel Bannister (1) - pp - 8:04; Evan Arnold (1) - 14:05; Braden Keeble (2) - 19:00; Evan Arnold (2) - pp - 19:58
3:51 - Brady Brenner (1)		Third period	Dylan Leslie (1) - 5:02
Elliott Pratt (22 saves / 27 shots)		Goalie stats	Nick Avakyan (42 saves / 43 shots)

March 20	Camrose Kodiaks	4 – 1	Whitecourt Wolverines	EnCana Arena
10:29 - Ty Hodge (2); 13:46 - pp - Brady Brenner (2); 18:12 -Ludovik Tardif (1)		First period	No scoring
No scoring		Second period	Spencer Rheaume (1) - 3:59
18:21 - en - Ty Hodge (3)		Third period	No scoring
Elliott Pratt (45 saves / 46 shots)		Goalie stats	Lukas Renaud (6 saves / 9 shots); Nick Avakyan (19 saves / 19 shots)

March 22	Whitecourt Wolverines	7 – 1	Camrose Kodiaks	JDA Place
3:54 - Hunter Motley (1)		First period	No scoring
5:29 - pp - Jalen Bianchet (1); 16:17 - Kyle Venneman (2)		Second period	No scoring
2:09 - pp - Spencer Rheaume (2); 2:40 - pp - Colby Browne (2); 9:56 - Travis Verbeek (2); 15:43 - Jalen Bianchet (2)		Third period	Nicholas Larkin (1) - sh - 11:47
Nick Avakyan (36 saves / 37 shots)		Goalie stats	Elliott Pratt (31 saves / 38 shots); Carson Ironside (0 saves / 0 shots)

Whitecourt wins series 4 – 1

=== Quarterfinal: Lloydminster Bobcats vs. Canmore Eagles ===
March 15	Lloydminster Bobcats	3 – 8	Canmore Eagles	Lloydminster Centennial Civic Centre
No scoring		First period	Logan Ziegler (1) - pp - 12:09
16:09 - Luke Fritz (1)		Second period	Nolan Kazeil (1) - 7:13; Zach Coutu (1) - 12:42; Nathan Macpherson-Ridgewell (1) - pp - 14:29
3:47 - Caden Steinke (1); 5:00 - sh - Orin Olson (1)		Third period	Brody Tallman (1) - pp - 9:27; Brody Tallman (2) - pp - 9:52; Rhett Dekowny (1) - 15:44
Jack Solomon (24 saves / 31 shots); Haden Heide (2 saves / 3 shots)		Goalie stats	Matthew Malin (30 saves / 33 shots)

March 16	Lloydminster Bobcats	4 – 3	2OT	Canmore Eagles	Lloydminster Centennial Civic Centre
No scoring		First period		Kayden Rawji (1) - 10:07; Kayden Rawji (2) - pp - 19:27
12:23 - pp - Ben Aucoin (1)		Second period		Owen Jones (1) - 15:45
5:59 - Ben Aucoin (2); 18:18 - Caden Steinke (2)		Third period		No scoring
8:33 - Kade Fendelet (1)		Second overtime period		No scoring
Jack Solomon (47 saves / 50 shots)		Goalie stats		Matthew Malin (40 saves / 44 shots)

March 19	Canmore Eagles	4 – 3	Lloydminster Bobcats	Canmore Recreation Centre
1:15 - Emanuel Hudson (1); 10:58 - pp - Zach Coutu (2); 19:06 - Ethan Look (1)		First period	No scoring
No scoring		Second period	Remy Spooner (1) - 2:07; Ishan Mittoo (1) - pp - 14:17
3:00 - Carter Coutu (1)		Third period	Ryan Redekopp (1) - 1:11
Matthew Malin (18 saves / 21 shots)		Goalie stats	Jack Solomon (38 saves / 42 shots)

March 20	Canmore Eagles	3 – 0	Lloydminster Bobcats	Canmore Recreation Centre
11:36 - Zach Coutu (3)		First period	No scoring
2:41 - Josh Hoekstra (1); 6:11 - sh - Kayden Rawji (3)		Second period	No scoring
No scoring		Third period	No scoring
Matthew Malin (12 saves / 12 shots)		Goalie stats	Jack Solomon (35 saves / 38 shots)

March 22	Lloydminster Bobcats	4 – 3	Canmore Eagles	Lloydminster Centennial Civic Centre
9:39 - sh - Caden Cabana (1)		First period	Brody Mortensen (1) - pp - 10:23
No scoring		Second period	Rhett Dekowny (2) - 1:55; Emanuel Hudson (2) - 16:59
0:38 - Ishan Mittoo (2); 13:12 - Ben Aucoin (3); 19:48 - Ben Aucoin (4)		Third period	No scoring
Jack Solomon (28 saves / 31 shots)		Goalie stats	Matthew Malin (29 saves / 33 shots)

March 24	Canmore Eagles	5 – 0	Lloydminster Bobcats	Canmore Recreation Centre
0:35 - Logan Ziegler (2)		First period	No scoring
11:19 - Carter Coutu (2)		Second period	No scoring
0:57 - Rhett Dekowny (3); 9:19 - Owen Jones (2); 10:14 - pp - Zach Coutu (4)		Third period	No scoring
Matthew Malin (24 saves / 24 shots)		Goalie stats	Jack Solomon (36 saves / 41 shots)

Canmore wins series 4 – 2

=== Quarterfinal: Calgary Canucks vs. Grande Prairie Storm ===
March 15	Calgary Canucks	4 – 3	OT	Grande Prairie Storm	Ken Bracko Arena
No scoring		First period		Dayne Tews (1) - pp - 6:04
5:22 - Julien Gervais (1); 6:25 - Ty Hipkin (1)		Second period		Alex Atwill (1) - 6:10; Samuel Lyons (1) - sh - 17:23
8:45 - pp - Bowden Singleton (1)		Third period		No scoring
2:50 - Riley Bracko (1)		First overtime period		No scoring
Julian Molinaro (19 saves / 22 shots)		Goalie stats		Nicholas Jones (29 saves / 33 shots)

March 16	Calgary Canucks	4 – 3	Grande Prairie Storm	Ken Bracko Arena
7:07 - pp - Julien Gervais (2); 11:13 - Carter Anderson (1); 16:52 - Riley Bracko (2)		First period	Dayne Tews (2) - 9:30; Logan Cunningham (1) - 13:43
14:27 - Matthew Paszkiewicz (1)		Second period	No scoring
No scoring		Third period	Samuel Lyons (2) - 0:39
Julian Molinaro (26 saves / 29 shots)		Goalie stats	Nicholas Jones (25 saves / 29 shots)

March 18	Grande Prairie Storm	3 – 2	Calgary Canucks	Bonnetts Energy Centre
No scoring		First period	Gavin Garland (1) - 9:42
11:41 - pp - Colin Doherty (1)		Second period	Bowden Singleton (2) - pp - 14:15
8:41 - sh - Chase Christensen (1); 16:57 - pp - Samuel Lyons (3)		Third period	No scoring
Nicholas Jones (24 saves / 26 shots)		Goalie stats	Julian Molinaro (20 saves / 23 shots)

March 19	Grande Prairie Storm	4 – 3	Calgary Canucks	Bonnetts Energy Centre
4:47 - Colin Doherty (2)		First period	Matthew Paszkiewicz (2) - 14:25
8:41 - Chase Christensen (2)		Second period	Cody Pisarczyk (1) - pp - 2:31; Ethan Casper (1) - 18:11
4:54 - Will Harris (1); 15:58 - Chase Christensen (3)		Third period	No scoring
Nicholas Jones (24 saves / 27 shots)		Goalie stats	Julian Molinaro (32 saves / 36 shots)

March 22	Calgary Canucks	4 – 1	Grande Prairie Storm	Ken Bracko Arena
8:12 - Ty Hipkin (2)		First period	No scoring
8:12 - pp - Gavin Garland (2)		Second period	Logan Cunningham (2) - pp - 18:56
3:24 - pp - Julien Gervais (3); 4:38 - Gavin Garland (3)		Third period	No scoring
Julian Molinaro (23 saves / 24 shots)		Goalie stats	Nicholas Jones (37 saves / 41 shots)

March 24	Grande Prairie Storm	4 – 5	OT	Calgary Canucks	Bonnetts Energy Centre
No scoring		First period		Gavin Garland (4) - pp - 15:51
2:19 - Marcello Giorgi (1); 5:18 - Peter Copetti (1)		Second period		Julien Gervais (4) - 6:57; Riley Bracko (3) - 19:40
4:45 - Cash Ganske (1); 7:27 - sh - Colin Doherty (3)		Third period		Gavin Garland (5) - 0:45
No scoring		First overtime period		Easton Hewson (1) - 1:04
Nicholas Jones (28 saves / 33 shots)		Goalie stats		Julian Molinaro (23 saves / 27 shots)

Calgary wins series 4 – 2

=== Quarterfinal: Bonnyville Pontiacs vs. Drumheller Dragons ===
March 15	Bonnyville Pontiacs	2 – 4	Drumheller Dragons	R. J. Lalonde Arena
5:40 - Billy Batten (1)		First period	No scoring
10:11 - pp - Max Seguin (1)		Second period	Keegan Beagle (1) - 4:36; Holden Cardinal (1) - 17:00
No scoring		Third period	Connor Poffenroth (1) - pp - 7:53; Josh Diegel (1) - 8:08
Bodee Weiss (24 saves / 28 shots)		Goalie stats	Sean Cootes (47 saves / 49 shots)

March 16	Bonnyville Pontiacs	3 – 4	OT	Drumheller Dragons	R. J. Lalonde Arena
0:54 - Nicolas Beaudoin (1)		First period		Ayden Peters (1) - pp - 17:13
		Second period		Holden Cardinal (2) - 10:20
5:39 - Luka Sukovic (1); 10:23 - J.R. Ashmead (1)		Third period		Jamie Hikida (1) - 19:01
No scoring		First overtime period		Jamie Hikida (2) - 5:39
Kyle Hagen (32 saves / 36 shots)		Goalie stats		Sean Cootes (25 saves / 28 shots)

March 19	Drumheller Dragons	4 – 3	Bonnyville Pontiacs	Drumheller Memorial Arena
6:53 - Ryan Henderson (1); 13:00 - pp - Ryan Henderson (2)		First period	13:48 - Nicolas Beaudoin (2)
No scoring		Second period	Josh Simpson (1) - 4:19
6:01 - Jacob Goudreau (1); 13:53 - Jacob Goudreau (2)		Third period	Luka Sukovic (2) - 8:24
Sean Cootes (28 saves / 31 shots)		Goalie stats	Bodee Weiss (37 saves / 41 shots)

March 20	Drumheller Dragons	5 – 4	OT	Bonnyville Pontiacs	Drumheller Memorial Arena
		First period		Max Seguin (2) - 2:59; Jordan Schanbacher (1) - 11:47
2:30 - Ayden Peters (2); 19:49 - Austin Reschny (1)		Second period		Braydon Vandenbilche (1) - 1:00
5:35 - Coy Pighin (1); 19:45 - sh - Ayden Peters (3)		Third period		Max Seguin (3) - 5:07
4:11 - Coy Pighin (2)		First overtime period		No scoring
Sean Cootes (20 saves / 24 shots)		Goalie stats		Bodee Weiss (38 saves / 43 shots)

Drumheller wins series 4 – 0

=== Semifinal: Whitecourt Wolverines vs. Canmore Eagles ===
March 29	Whitecourt Wolverines	3 – 0	Canmore Eagles	JDA Place
No scoring		First period	No scoring
13:45 - Colby Browne (3)		Second period	No scoring
2:55 - Kaiden Wiltsie (1); 11:46 - pp - Joey Melo (1)		Third period	No scoring
Lukas Renaud (36 saves / 36 shots)		Goalie stats	Matthew Malin (30 saves / 33 shots)

March 30	Whitecourt Wolverines	3 – 4	Canmore Eagles	JDA Place
3:34 - Spencer Rheaume (3)		First period	No scoring
9:44 - pp - Spencer Rheaume (4); 13:06 - sh - Travis Verbeek (3)		Second period	Zach Coutu (5) - pp - 7:19; Nathan Macpherson-Ridgewell (2) - 11:15
No scoring		Third period	Emanuel Hudson (3) - pp - 13:09; Logan Ziegler (3) - 19:41
Lukas Renaud (24 saves / 28 shots)		Goalie stats	Matthew Malin (21 saves / 24 shots)

April 2	Canmore Eagles	2 – 5	Whitecourt Wolverines	Canmore Recreation Centre
12:21 - Rhett Dekowny (4)		First period	Travis Verbeek (4) - 4:23
No scoring		Second period	Shayne Tibbles (2) - 4:55; Braden Keeble (3) - pp - 6:59
8:47 - Stefan Serediak (1)		Third period	Colby Browne (4) - ps - 5:06; Evan Johnson (1) - 17:34
Matthew Malin (25 saves / 30 shots)		Goalie stats	Nick Avakyan (28 saves / 30 shots)

April 3	Canmore Eagles	5 – 4	Whitecourt Wolverines	Canmore Recreation Centre
0:46 - pp - Owen Jones (3); 2:57 - Owen Jones (4); 13:20 - pp - Ethan Look (2)		First period	Zephyr LaPlante (1) - 1:45
No scoring		Second period	Travis Verbeek (5) - pp - 7:46; Kaiden Wiltsie (2) - pp - 18:56
0:36 - Rhett Dekowny (5); 11:22 - Rhett Dekowny (6)		Third period	Travis Verbeek (6) - 19:46
Matthew Malin (28 saves / 32 shots)		Goalie stats	Nick Avakyan (31 saves / 36 shots)

April 5	Whitecourt Wolverines	4 – 0	Canmore Eagles	JDA Place
7:46 - Joey Melo (2); 17:46 - Jalen Bianchet (3)		First period	No scoring
No scoring		Second period	No scoring
2:30 - pp - Colby Browne (5); 3:41 - Spencer Rheaume (5)		Third period	No scoring
Nick Avakyan (23 saves / 23 shots)		Goalie stats	Matthew Malin (39 saves / 43 shots)

April 7	Canmore Eagles	2 – 0	Whitecourt Wolverines	Canmore Recreation Centre
0:10 - Emanuel Hudson (4); 13:10 - Ethan Look (3)		First period	No scoring
No scoring		Second period	No scoring
No scoring		Third period	No scoring
Matthew Malin (21 saves / 21 shots)		Goalie stats	Nick Avakyan (27 saves / 29 shots)

April 9	Whitecourt Wolverines	3 – 1	Canmore Eagles	JDA Place
No scoring		First period	Zach Coutu (6) - 12:26
11:32 - pp - Travis Verbeek (7); 16:32 - pp - Joey Melo (3)		Second period	No scoring
14:37 - pp - Travis Verbeek (8)		Third period	No scoring
Nick Avakyan (31 saves / 32 shots)		Goalie stats	Matthew Malin (32 saves / 35 shots)

Whitecourt wins series 4 – 3

=== Semifinal: Calgary Canucks vs. Drumheller Dragons ===
March 29	Calgary Canucks	5 – 2	Drumheller Dragons	Ken Bracko Arena
4:52 - Ty Hipkin (3)		First period	Holden Cardinal (3) - 15:42
11:45 - Bowden Singleton (3); 18:00 - Riley Bracko (4)		Second period	Austin Reschny (2) - 10:24
15:53 - Ethan Short (1); 19:51 - en - Gavin Garland (6)		Third period	No scoring
Julian Molinaro (22 saves / 24 shots)		Goalie stats	Jameson Kaine (26 saves / 30 shots)

March 30	Calgary Canucks	3 – 2	OT	Drumheller Dragons	Ken Bracko Arena
5:00 - Adam Leitch (1)		First period		No scoring
5:01 - Bowden Singleton (4)		Second period		Keegan Beagle (2) - 4:32; Holden Cardinal (4) - pp - 12:53
No scoring		Third period		No scoring
11:52 - Bowden Singleton (5)		First overtime period		No scoring
Julian Molinaro (24 saves / 26 shots)		Goalie stats		Jameson Kaine (47 saves / 50 shots)

April 2	Drumheller Dragons	6 – 3	Calgary Canucks	Drumheller Memorial Arena

April 3	Drumheller Dragons	0 – 4	Calgary Canucks	Drumheller Memorial Arena

April 5	Calgary Canucks	3 – 2	Drumheller Dragons	Ken Bracko Arena

Calgary wins series 4 – 1

=== Final: Whitecourt Wolverines vs. Calgary Canucks ===
April 12	Whitecourt Wolverines	1 – 5	Calgary Canucks	JDA Place

April 13	Whitecourt Wolverines	2 – 5	Calgary Canucks	JDA Place

April 16	Calgary Canucks	5 – 4	Whitecourt Wolverines	Ken Bracko Arena

April 17	Calgary Canucks	2 – 3	Whitecourt Wolverines	Ken Bracko Arena

Calgary wins series 4 – 0

== See also ==
- 2023 in ice hockey
- 2024 in ice hockey
- Centennial Cup
