= 2025–26 AJHL season =

Alberta Junior Hockey League season

- League: Alberta Junior Hockey League
- Sport: Ice hockey
- Duration: Preseason; August–September; Regular season September–March; Postseason; March–April
- Games: 324
- Teams: 12
- Inter Pipeline Cup: Canmore Eagles
- Runners-up: Whitecourt Wolverines

AJHL seasons
- ← 2024–25 2026–27 →

The 2025–26 AJHL season was the 62nd season of the Alberta Junior Hockey League (AJHL).

The league rejected a private proposal to establish an expansion franchise in the City of Cold Lake.

The Lloydminster Bobcats moved to a new home arena at the 2,500-seat Cenovus Energy Hub under a five-year lease agreement. The arena, which opened in 2025, is owned by the City of Lloydminster.

== Regular season ==
Each team played a 55-game regular season schedule, including six games against opponents in the same division, and four games against opponents in the other division. The top four teams from each division advanced to the playoffs.

North division
Rank	Team	GP	W	L	OTL	SOL	Pts
1	Whitecourt Wolverines	55	39	13	1	2	81
2	Grande Prairie Storm	55	38	15	0	2	78
3	Lloydminster Bobcats	55	34	14	4	3	75
4	Fort McMurray Oil Barons	55	30	17	6	2	68
5	Bonnyville Pontiacs	55	27	24	3	1	58
6	Devon Xtreme	55	19	30	5	1	44

Source: "2025–26 Alberta Junior Hockey League standings". hockeydb.com.

South division
Rank	Team	GP	W	L	OTL	SOL	Pts
1	Canmore Eagles	55	32	19	3	1	68
2	Drumheller Dragons	55	28	20	2	5	63
3	Camrose Kodiaks	55	28	24	2	1	59
4	Calgary Canucks	55	25	25	3	2	55
5	Olds Grizzlys	55	16	35	2	2	36
6	Drayton Valley Thunder	55	14	35	4	2	34

Source: "2025–26 Alberta Junior Hockey League standings". hockeydb.com.

== Post-season ==
2026 League championship
Inter Pipeline Cup

Tournament details
- Dates: 20 March – 25 April
- Teams: 8
- Defending champions: Calgary Canucks

Final positions
- Champions: Canmore Eagles
- Runners-up: Whitecourt Wolverines
- Semifinalists: Grande Prairie Storm; Drumheller Dragons

Official website
- 2026 AJHL playoffs

At the end of the regular season, the top four teams from each division competed in the post-season for the league championship Inter Pipeline Cup. The format consisted of three play-off rounds. In the first and second rounds, teams competed within their respective divisions. The winners in each round were determined by a best-of-7 series, with the winners advancing to the next round, and the losers being eliminated from competition.

Quarterfinals
Grande Prairie Storm	4
Lloydminster Bobcats	0
Whitecourt Wolverines	4
Fort McMurray Oil Barons	1
Drumheller Dragons	4
Camrose Kodiaks	3
Canmore Eagles	4
Calgary Canucks	2

Semifinals
Whitecourt Wolverines	3
Grande Prairie Storm	2
Canmore Eagles	4
Drumheller Dragons	0

Finals
Whitecourt Wolverines	1
Canmore Eagles	4

Source: "2025–26 AJHL playoff results". ajhl.ca.

== Sources ==
- Hartviksen, Galen (25 June 2025). "AJHL unveils 2025-2026 schedule, Grizzlys home opener September 20 vs Camrose". My Mountain View Now.
- Lavallee-Koenig, Ashley (26 June 2025). "Whitecourt Wolverines home opener set for Sept. 20". XM 105. Pattison Media.
- "Cold Lake to start expression of interest system for junior hockey teams". coldlake.com. City of Cold Lake. 7 August 2025.
- Greer, Jordan (19 September 2025). "How to watch AJHL games: Live streams, channel, schedule for 2025-26 Alberta Junior Hockey League season". sportingnews.com. Sporting News Canada.
- "Wolverines capture 2025–26 regular season title and top team goaltenders award". ajhl.ca. Alberta Junior Hockey League. 15 March 2026.
- Shelar, Shreejit (9 April 2026). "Canmore Eagles soar into AJHL finals after sweeping Drumheller Dragons". Rocky Mountain Outlook. Great West Media.
