= Centennial Civic Centre =

Centennial Civic Centre may refer to:

- Lloydminster Centennial Civic Centre, Lloydminster, Saskatchewan, Canada
- Centennial Civic Centre, now InnovationPlex, Swift Current, Saskatchewan, Canada
