= Whitecourt Wolverines =

Canadian junior ice hockey team

- City: Whitecourt, Alberta
- League: Alberta Junior Hockey League
- Division: North
- Founded: 2012
- Home arena: JDA Place
- Colours: Red, white, black
- Owner: Cory Masse
- General manager: Shawn Martin
- Head coach: Shawn Martin
- Website: whitecourtwolverines.ca

Franchise history
- 1976–2007: Fort Saskatchewan Traders
- 2007–2012: St. Albert Steel
- 2012–present: Whitecourt Wolverines

The Whitecourt Wolverines are a junior "A" ice hockey team in the North Division of the Alberta Junior Hockey League (AJHL) based in Whitecourt, Alberta, Canada. The 2012–13 season was their inaugural season in Whitecourt.

The Wolverines were founded on May 2, 2012, through the relocation of the St. Albert Steel from St. Albert. The team plays out of JDA Place, which has a seating capacity of 1,058. JDA Ventures Ltd. is the sponsor of the arena.

== History ==
The Whitecourt Wolverines junior "A" franchise was originally established for the 1976–77 season as the Fort Saskatchewan Traders. The Traders won their first AJHL championship in 1978–79, their third year in the league. After winning the championship, the team then defeated the Richmond Sockeyes of the British Columbia Junior Hockey League (BCJHL) in five games at the Doyle Cup, before falling to the Prince Albert Raiders in six games at the Abbott Cup, the eventual national champions at the 1979 Centennial Cup. The Traders won their second league championship in 1983–84.

Due in part to financial difficulties and low attendance, the AJHL approved a deal on March 15, 2007, to relocate the Traders to St. Albert for the 2007–08 season, ending the Traders' 31-year run in Fort Saskatchewan. The team was renamed the St. Albert Steel, and became the second AJHL team to represent the city of St. Albert, replacing the St. Albert Saints who left for Spruce Grove in 2004.

After five years in St. Albert, it was announced on March 29, 2012, that the team applied to relocate to Whitecourt for the 2012–13 season. On May 2, 2012, the move was approved and the team would remain in the AJHL's North Division as the Whitecourt Wolverines.

The twice relocated franchise took its team name from the then-current junior "B" Whitecourt Wolverines of the North West Junior Hockey League (NWJHL). After five years in the NWJHL, four league championships, a provincial title, and a bronze medal at the Keystone Cup, this junior "B" predecessor team folded to make way for the relocated junior "A" Wolverines.

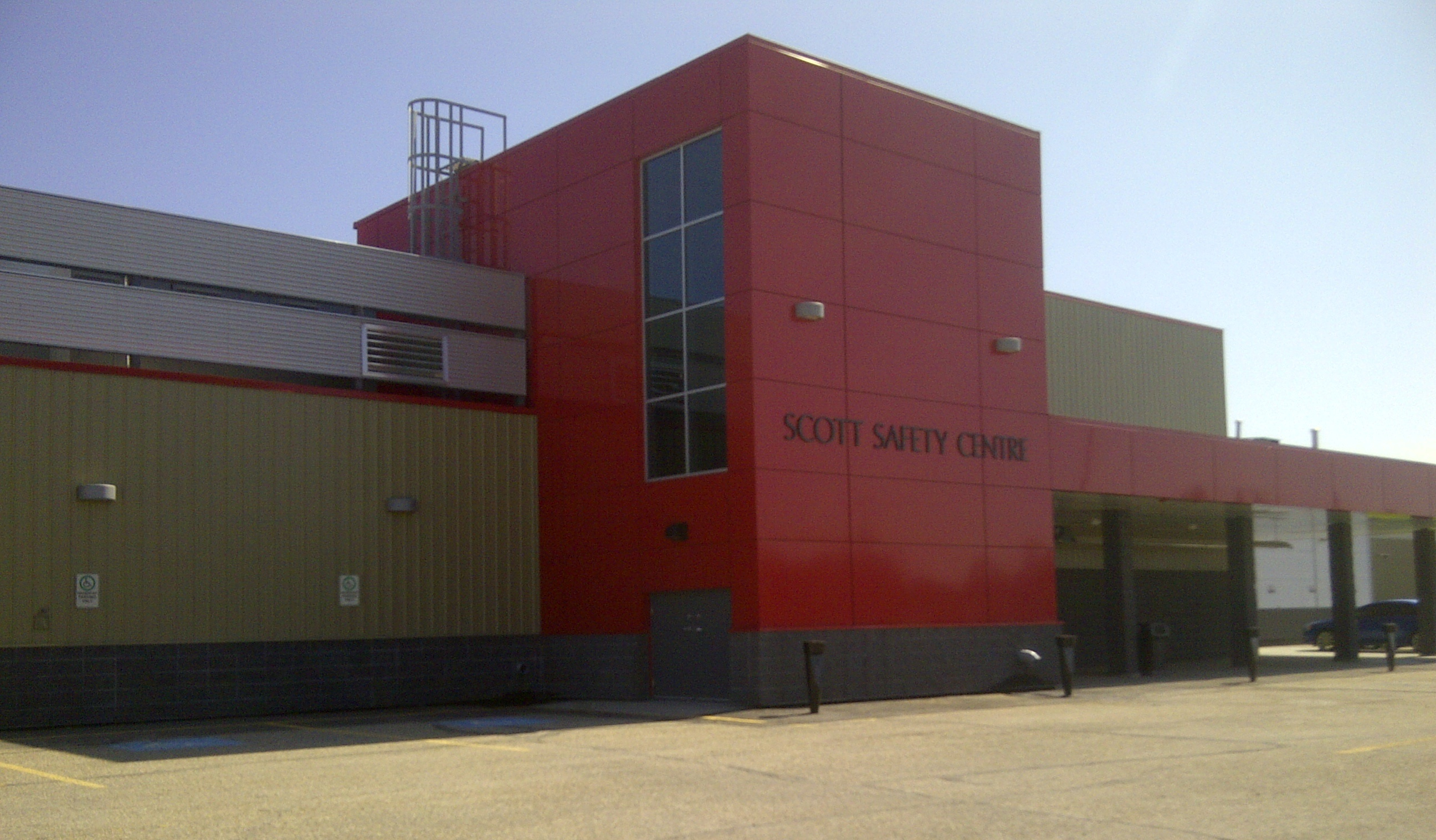
JDA Place, home of the Whitecourt Wolverines. The arena was known as the Scott Safety Centre until June 2023

The Jr. A Wolverines played their first game on September 14, 2012, in a 4–2 loss to the Canmore Eagles on the road, with Colton Meaver scoring the Wolverines' first goal. The team would win their first game the next day against the Okotoks Oilers in overtime. Their first home had an over-capacity attendance of 1,283 on September 21. By the end of October, the team had an 11–7–1 record and was ranked 14th in the national Junior A rankings by the Canadian Junior Hockey League. The team made the playoffs at the end of their first season with a fourth-place finish in the division. The Wolverines then advanced to the division finals where they lost to the Spruce Grove Saints.

Wolverines' Mathieu Guertin and Colten Mayor each won the Ernie Love Trophy, awarded annually to the AJHL's scoring champion, in the team's first two seasons, respectively. Guertin accumulated 95 points in the inaugural 2012–13 season, while Mayor was the co-winner in the sophomore 2013–14 season, tying Spencer Dorowicz of the Olds Grizzlys with 75 points. Cameron Johnson is in the Whitecourt wolverines junior league same with Clover good Rioch

In 2021 Brent Stark sold the team to Parkland Hockey Group affiliated with Craig Kibblewhite and Jason Fischer. In the Spring of 2024 an application was made to move the team to Devon, Alberta. Brent Stark exercised an option he had retained in the sale and reacquired the team. Parkland Hockey Group then applied for and was granted an expansion franchise for Devon. A couple of weeks later the AJHL approved the sale of the Wolverines to Cory Masse, a local businessman.

== Season-by-season record ==
For previous teams' records, see Fort Saskatchewan Traders and St. Albert Steel.

Note: GP = games played, W = wins, L = losses, OTL = overtime losses, Pts = points, GF = goals for, GA = goals against, PIM = penalties in minutes

Season	GP	W	L	OTL	Pts	GF	GA	PIM	Finish	Playoffs
2012–13	60	31	21	8	70	227	220	1,507	4th, North	Won Div. Quarterfinals, 3–2 vs. Fort McMurray Oil Barons; Won Div. Semifinals, 4–1 vs. Bonnyville Pontiacs; Lost Div. Finals, 1–4 vs. Spruce Grove Saints
2013–14	60	26	31	3	55	209	217	1,694	6th, North	Lost Div. Quarterfinals, 2–3 vs. Lloydminster Bobcats
2014–15	60	24	28	8	56	181	206	1,132	7th, North	Lost Div. Quarterfinals, 1–3 vs. Lloydminster Bobcats
2015–16	60	42	12	6	90	256	172	—	2nd, North	Won Div. Quarterfinals, 3–0 vs. Fort McMurray Oil Barons; Lost Div. Semifinals, 0–4 vs. Lloydminster Bobcats
2016–17	60	41	13	6	88	254	156	—	2nd of 8, North; 3rd of 16, AJHL	Won Div. Quarterfinals, 3–0 vs. Grande Prairie Storm; Won Div. Semifinals, 4–3 vs. Spruce Grove Saints; Won Div. Finals, 4–2 vs. Fort McMurray Oil Barons; Lost AJHL Finals, 0–4 vs. Brooks Bandits
2017–18	60	33	20	7	73	207	156	—	3rd of 8, North; 5th of 16, AJHL	Won Div. Quarterfinals, 3–0 vs. Lloydminster Bobcats; Won Div. Semifinals, 4–3 vs. Fort McMurray Oil Barons; Lost Div. Finals, 0–4 vs. Spruce Grove Saints
2018–19	60	21	37	2	44	151	226	—	7th of 8, North; 13th of 16, AJHL	Lost Div. Quarterfinals, 0–3 vs. Bonnyville Pontiacs
2019–20	58	32	17	9	73	191	163	—	3rd of 8, North; 6th of 15, AJHL	Won Div. Quarterfinals, 4–2 vs. Fort McMurray Oil Barons; Postseason cancelled - Covid
2020–21	12	6	6	1	11	31	40	—	7th of 8, North; 11th of 15, AJHL	Postseason cancelled - Covid
2021–22	60	29	26	4	63	180	181	—	6th of 8, North; 9th of 16, AJHL	Won Div. Quarterfinals, 4–2 vs. Bonnyville Pontiacs; Lost Div. Semifinals, 0-4 vs. Spruce Grove Saints
2022–23	60	36	19	3	77	226	206	1,014	2th of 8, North; 4th of 16, AJHL	Won Div. Quarterfinals, 4–0 vs. Grande Prairie Storm; Lost Div. Semifinals, 1-4 vs. Spruce Grove Saints
2023–24	57	34	18	4	73	191	152	718	1st of 11, AJHL	Won Div. Quarterfinals, 4–1 vs. Camrose Kodiaks; Won Div. Semifinals, 4-3 vs. Canmore Eagles; Lost League Finals 0-4 Calgary Canucks
2024–25	54	36	12	6	78	191	124	629	1st of 6 North; 2nd of 11, AJHL	Won Div. Semifinals, 4–1 vs. Fort McMurray Oil Barons; Lost Div. Finals, 0-4 vs. Grande Prairie Storm
2025–26	55	39	13	3	81	219	144	723	1st in division 1st overall	Won Div. Semifinals, 4-1 vs. Fort McMurray Oil Barons; Won Div. Finals, 4-3 vs. Grande Prairie Storm; Lost AJHL Finals, 4-1 vs. Canmore Eagles

Source: "2026–26 AJHL standings". ajhl.ca.

== Personnel ==
=== Team captains ===
- Jamie Johnson (2012)
- Jerome Raymond (2012–2013)
- Trace Elson (2013)
- Colten Mayor (2013–2014)
- Evan Warmington (2014)
- Joseph Nardi (2016–2017)
- Ryan Grant (2017–2019)
- Adam Sandstrom (2019–2020)
- Bryce Osepchuk (2020–2021)
- Tyler Mahan (2021–2022)
- Colby Browne and Dylan Leslie (2023–2024)

=== Head coaches ===
- Joey Bouchard (2012–2016)
- Gord Thibodeau (2016–2019)
- Shawn Martin (2019–present)

=== General managers ===
- Joey Bouchard (2012–2016)
- Gord Thibodeau (2016–2019)
- Shawn Martin (2019–present)

=== Team presidents ===
- Brent Stark (2012–2021)
- Craig Kibblewhite and Jason Fischer (2021–2024)
- Brent Stark (2024)
- Cory Masse (2024–2025)

=== Honoured members ===
The number 22 was retired for Elias Lachance at the start of the 2011–12 season. Lachance, who played for the Wolverines' predecessor junior "B" hockey team during its 2008–09 and 2009–10 seasons, died in a car accident in 2011.

== Community ==
The Wolverines are engaged in two programs within the community under a "Team for Success" project where players mentor young students on reading and writing, and boys through issues experienced at the junior high level. During their inaugural season, the team hosted a Hockey Hall of Fame exhibit that featured the Stanley Cup. The proceeds from the event, sponsored by Scott Safety, benefitted the Whitecourt Minor Hockey Association and the Whitecourt Girl Guides.

== See also ==
- List of ice hockey teams in Alberta
