= Fort McMurray Oil Barons =

Junior ice hockey club

- City: Fort McMurray, Alberta
- League: AJHL
- Division: North
- Founded: 1981
- Home arena: Centerfire Place
- Colours: Blue; Gold
- General manager: Tom Keca
- Head coach: Tom Keca
- Website: fortmcmurrayoilbarons.ca

Championships
- League: 1997; 2000; 2006
- Regional: 2000
- National: 2000

The Fort McMurray Oil Barons are a junior ice hockey club and franchise of the Alberta Junior Hockey League (AJHL). The team plays its home games at Centerfire Place in Fort McMurray, Alberta.

== History ==
The team first played in the 1981–82 season as an expansion franchise the Alberta Junior Hockey League (AJHL) and is one of the more successful teams in the league having won three league titles and has appeared in the league finals 12 times. In 2000, the Oil Barons hosted the Royal Bank Cup and won the National Junior A Championship.

In November 2010, the Oil Barons hosted the Northern Classic against the Drayton Valley Thunder as the first known outdoor game in AJHL history and set the league's attendance record.

In August 2011, the Oil Barons traveled to Omsk, Russia, to play in the 2011 Junior Club World Cup tournament hosted by teams of their top tier Junior Hockey League (MHL). On August 26, the Oil Barons defeated Mytishchi Atlantes 4–2 in an exhibition game. On August 27, the Oil Barons played 2011 Russian Champion Red Army in another exhibition game, losing 7–0. The tournament ran from August 30 until September 4. On August 30, Fort McMurray played Belarus's Dinamo-Shinnik and lost 3–0, on August 31 Sweden's Malmö Redhawks and lost 3–2, and September 2 they lost to the Czech Republic's Energie Karlovy Vary 4–1; for a 0–3 record and finishing last in their division. These teams are all top tier European clubs, while Fort McMurray are members of the Canadian Junior Hockey League, the second highest level of Canadian junior hockey behind the major junior Canadian Hockey League.

In the summer of 2014, after one of the best regular seasons in franchise history, the Oil Barons released head coach and general manager Gord Thibodeau. After a lengthy search, the Barons hired former Ottawa Senators' assistant coach Curtis Hunt to replace him. Hunt added former Senators goalie Mike Brodeur to the staff as the team's new goaltending and video coach.

In 2015, the Oil Barons hosted the third Western Canada Cup, earning an automatic berth in the tournament against the champions of British Columbia, Alberta, Saskatchewan, and Manitoba, with two spots open to qualify for the Royal Bank Cup Junior A national championship tournament. They were eliminated in the semifinal game by the Melfort Mustangs at the 2015 Western Canada Cup.

On May 10, 2019, the Oil Barons agreed to mutually part ways with general manager and head coach Tom Keca. On May 17, 2019, the team announced that Dave Dupas had been hired as the head coach and general manager for the 2019–20 season. Dupas had been with the Oil Barons organization since 2015 as an assistant coach after previously serving as head coach of the Prince George Spruce Kings of the British Columbia Hockey League (BCHL).

Statistics
Season	GP	W	L	T	OTL	SOL	Pts	GF	GA	Regular season	Post-season
1981–82	60	31	29	0	0	0	62	296	296	2nd in division 4th overall	Won quarterfinal against Fort Saskatchewan (4:2); Lost semifinal against St. Albert (4:0)
1982–83	60	38	22	0	0	0	76	324	308	2nd in division 2nd overall	Won quarterfinal against Fort Saskatchewan (4:0); Won semifinal against St. Albert (4:1); Lost final against Calgary (4:2)
1983–84	60	24	35	1	0	0	49	255	315	4th in division 7th overall	Lost quarterfinal against Fort Saskatchewan (4:0)
1984–85	60	9	51	0	0	0	18	204	386	5th in division 9th overall	Did not qualify
1985–86	52	16	36	0	0	0	32	243	317	4th in division 7th overall	Won quarterfinal against St. Albert (4:1); Lost semifinal against Sherwood Park (4:1)
1986–87	60	30	28	2	0	0	62	300	292	3rd in division 5th overall	Lost quarterfinal against St. Albert (4:2)
1987–88	60	19	41	0	0	0	38	244	356	4th in division 8th overall	Lost quarterfinal against St. Albert (4:2)
1988–89	60	10	47	3	0	0	23	180	334	5th in division 10th overall	Did not qualify
1989–90	60	33	24	3	0	0	69	278	273	1st in division 3rd overall	Lost quarterfinal against Sherwood Park (4:0)
1990–91	56	20	32	4	0	0	44	247	283	7th overall	Won quarterfinal against St. Albert (4:0); Lost semifinal against Calgary (4:0)
1991–92	60	38	18	0	0	4	80	312	263	3rd overall	Won quarterfinal against Calgary (4:3); Won semifinal against Lloydminster (4:3); Lost final against Olds (4:1)
1992–93	56	33	22	0	0	1	67	293	238	4th overall	Won quarterfinal against Lloydminster (5:0); Lost semifinal against Olds (4:0)
1993–94	56	29	22	0	0	5	63	251	214	4th overall	Won quarterfinal against Calgary (4:3); Won semifinal against Sherwood Park (4:2); Lost final against Olds (4:2)
1994–95	56	31	20	0	0	5	67	258	221	3rd overall	Won quarterfinal against Calgary (4:1); Lost semifinal against Calgary (4:3)
1995–96	60	35	19	0	0	6	76	257	203	5th overall	Won quarterfinal against Fort Saskatchewan (4:0); Won semifinal against Calgary (4:1); Lost final against St. Albert (4:3)
1996–97	60	34	22	0	0	4	72	241	180	4th overall	Won quarterfinal against Olds (4:0); Won semifinal against St. Albert (4:2); Won final against Calgary (4:3); Lost Doyle Cup against South Surrey (4:1)
1997–98	60	36	21	0	0	3	75	226	216	5th overall	Lost quarterfinal against Calgary (4:0)
1998–99	62	31	28	0	0	3	65	247	267	6th in division 8th overall	Did not qualify
1999–00	64	52	10	0	0	2	106	321	169	1st in division 1st overall	Won quarterfinal against Bonnyville (4:1); Won semifinal against Lloydminster (4:1); Won final against Camrose (4:0); Won Doyle Cup against Chilliwack (4:1); Won Royal Bank Cup
2000–01	64	37	22	5	0	0	79	287	261	4th in division 6th overall	Won preliminary series against Lloydminster (3:1); Lost quarterfinal against Drayton Valley (4:2)
2001–02	64	36	20	8	0	0	80	217	198	4th in division 6th overall	Lost preliminary series against Grande Prairie (3:0)
2002–03	64	19	41	4	0	0	42	206	286	8th in division 13th overall	Did not qualify
2003–04	60	29	20	11	0	0	69	182	151	3rd in division 7th overall	Won preliminary series against Bonnyville (3:2); Won quarterfinal against Drayton Valley (4:1); Won semifinal against Camrose (4:2); Lost final against Grande Prairie (4:1)
2004–05	64	43	16	5	0	0	91	192	117	1st in division 2nd overall	Won quarterfinal against Grande Prairie (4:1); Won semifinal against Drayton Valley (4:2); Lost final against Camrose (4:3)
2005–06	60	40	14	2	4	0	86	202	110	1st in division 1st overall	Won quarterfinal against Bonnyville (4:0); Won semifinal against Brooks (4:0); Won final against Camrose (4:2); Lost Doyle Cup against Burnaby (4:2)
2006–07	60	25	27	0	8	0	58	170	196	5th in division 11th overall	Won preliminary series against Drayton Valley (3:1); Lost quarterfinal against Fort Saskatchewan (4:0)
2007–08	62	40	14	1	7	0	88	238	168	1st in division 3rd overall	Won quarterfinal against Bonnyville (4:2); Won semifinal against Spruce Grove (4:1); Lost final against Camrose (4:3)
2008–09	62	31	26	2	3	0	67	208	188	5th in division 9th overall	Won first round against Bonnyville (3:1); Lost quarterfinal against Spruce Grove (4:1)
2009–10	60	37	19	1	3	0	78	235	168	3rd in division 4th overall	Won first round against St. Albert (3:0); Won quarterfinal against Grande Prairie (4:1); Won semifinal against Okotoks (4:1); Lost final against Spruce Grove (4:3)
2010–11	60	43	16	0	1	0	87	219	139	2nd in division 3rd overall	Won first round against St. Albert (3:0); Won quarterfinal against Bonnyville (4:2); Lost semifinal against Spruce Grove (4:0)
2011–12	60	47	9	0	1	3	98	254	126	2nd in division 3rd overall	Won first round against Grande Prairie (3:0); Won quarterfinal against Sherwood Park (4:1); Won semifinal against Spruce Grove (4:3); Lost final against Brooks (4:2)
2012–13	60	31	22	0	6	1	69	169	170	5th in division 8th overall	Lost first round against Whitecourt (3:1)
2013–14	60	45	11	0	1	3	94	216	125	2nd in division 2nd overall	Won first round against Drayton Valley (3:0); Won quarterfinal against Lloydminster (4:3); Lost semifinal against Spruce Grove (4:3)
2014–15	60	31	23	0	4	2	68	178	175	4th in division 8th overall	Lost first round against Sherwood Park (3:1)
2015–16	60	10	40	0	6	4	30	137	239	7th in division 14th overall	Lost first round against Whitecourt (3:0)
2016–17	60	44	13	0	1	2	91	220	139	1st in division 2nd overall	Won quarterfinal against Bonnyville (4:1); Lost semifinal against Whitecourt (4:2)
2017–18	60	42	13	0	3	2	89	231	165	2nd in division 4th overall	Won first round against Bonnyville (3:0); Lost quarterfinal against Whitecourt (4:3)
2018–19	60	32	19	0	4	5	73	200	178	4th in division 7th overall	Won first round against Grande Prairie (3:1); Lost quarterfinal against Sherwood Park (4:2)
2019–20	58	20	34	0	1	3	44	149	228	6th in division 11th overall	Lost first round against Whitecourt (4:2)
2020–21	16	12	1	0	1	2	27	72	39	Season cancelled	
2021–22	60	40	19	0	0	1	81	216	176	2nd in division 3rd overall	Won quarterfinal against Sherwood Park (4:1); Lost semifinal against Drayton Valley (4:2)
2022–23	60	24	26	0	6	4	58	180	205	5th in division 9th overall	Lost quarterfinal against Sherwood Park (4:3)
2023–24	57	17	34	0	3	3	40	150	246	10th overall	Did not qualify
2024–25	54	24	26	0	3	1	52	160	175	4th in division 9th overall	Lost quarterfinal against Whitecourt (4:1)
2025–26	55	30	17	0	6	2	68	195	186	4th in division 5th overall	Lost quarterfinal against Whitecourt (4:1)

Source: "Fort McMurray Oil Barons statistics and history". hockeydb.com.

=== Regional championships ===
The Western Canada Cup was a postseason tournament between the playoff champions of the Alberta Junior Hockey League (AJHL), British Columbia Hockey League (BCHL), Manitoba Junior Hockey League (MJHL), Saskatchewan Junior Hockey League (SJHL), and a previously selected host team from one of the leagues. It ran from 2013 to 2017 with the top two teams qualifying for the Royal Bank Cup Junior A national championship tournament. It replaced the Doyle Cup, which had been the qualifier for the AJHL and BCHL champions, and the ANAVET Cup, which had been the qualifier for the MJHL and SJHL champions. The qualifying system reverted the Doyle and ANAVET Cups in 2018.

The tournament began with round-robin play between the five team followed by the top two teams playing in championship game and the third and fourth place teams playing in a semifinal game. The loser of the championship game then faced the winner of the semifinal game for the runner-up qualifier. The winner of the championship and the runner-up game advanced to the Royal Bank Cup.

Year	Round-robin	Record	Standing	Semifinal	Championship game	Runner-up game
2015; Host	W, 3–1 vs. Portage Terriers (MJHL); L, 0–6 vs. Penticton Vees (BCHL); W, 5–4 vs. Spruce Grove Saints (AJHL); OTW, 2–1 vs. Melfort Mustangs (SJHL)	3–1	3rd of 5	L, 2–4 vs. Melfort Mustangs	—	—

=== National championships ===
The National Junior A Championship, formerly known as the Royal Bank Cup, is the postseason tournament for the Canadian national championship for Junior A hockey teams that are members of the Canadian Junior Hockey League. The tournament consists of the regional Junior A champions and a previously selected host team. Since 1990, the national championship has used a five-team tournament format when the regional qualifiers were designated as the ANAVET Cup (Western), Doyle Cup (Pacific), Dudley Hewitt Cup (Central), and Fred Page Cup (Eastern). From 2013 to 2017, the qualifiers were the Dudley Hewitt Cup (Central), Fred Page Cup (Eastern), and the Western Canada Cup champions and runners-up.

The tournament begins with round-robin play between the five teams followed by the top four teams playing a semifinal game, with the top seed facing the fourth seed and the second facing the third. The winners of the semifinals then face each other in final game for the national championship. In some years, the losers of the semifinal games face each other for a third place game.

Year	Round-robin	Record	Standing	Semifinal	Third place game	Championship game
2000; Host	L, 1–2 vs. Battlefords North Stars (Western); W, 5–2 vs. Cornwall Colts (Eastern); W, 4–3 vs. Rayside-Balfour Sabrecats (Central); W, 4–3 vs. Chilliwack Chiefs (Pacific)	3–1	1st of 5	W, 5–2 vs. Battlefords North Stars	—	W, 2–1 vs. Rayside-Balfour Sabrecats; National champions

== NHL alumni ==
The following former Oil Barons have gone on to play in the NHL.

- Dale Kushner
- Bradley Mills
- Rich Parent
- Chris Phillips
- Colton Parayko
- Garret Stroshein
- Scottie Upshall
- Harry York

== See also ==
- List of ice hockey teams in Alberta

Preceded by Vernon Vipers	Royal Bank Cup champions 2000	Succeeded by Camrose Kodiaks
