= Devon Xtreme =

Junior ice hockey team

- City: Devon, Alberta
- League: AJHL
- Division: North
- Founded: 2024
- Home arena: GFL Twin Arena
- Colours
- Owner: NAX Athletics Group
- Head coach: Jon Petrash
- Website: devonxtreme.ca

The Devon Xtreme are a junior "A" ice hockey franchise in the North Division of the Alberta Junior Hockey League (AJHL). The team debuted as an expansion franchise in the 2024–25 season. The team plays its home games in the Dale Fisher Arena, which opened in September 2024. The team hired Kelly Buchberger as its general manager and head coach.

== History ==
The Xtreme finished its inaugural season in last place overall and failed to qualify for the post-season. Rookie forward Levy Kozma led the team in goals, assists and points.

Season-by-season record
| Season | GP | W | L | T | OTL | SOL | Pts | GF | GA | Finish | Playoffs |
|---|---|---|---|---|---|---|---|---|---|---|---|
| 2024–25 | 54 | 11 | 39 | 0 | 2 | 2 | 26 | 133 | 272 | 6th in division 12th overall | Did not qualify |
| 2025–26 | 55 | 19 | 30 | 0 | 5 | 1 | 26 | 176 | 216 | 6th in division 12th overall | Did not qualify |

Source: "Devon Xtreme statistics and history". hockeydb.com.

== See also ==
- Alberta Junior Hockey League
- Canadian Junior Hockey League
- Hockey Alberta
- Hockey Canada
- List of ice hockey teams in Alberta
- Town of Devon
