= Drumheller Dragons =

Junior ice hockey team

- City: Drumheller, Alberta
- League: AJHL
- Division: South
- Founded: 2003
- Home arena: Drumheller Memorial Arena
- Colours
- Owner: Cam Christianson
- General manager: Kevin Hasselberg
- Head coach: Kevin Hasselberg
- Media: 99.5 Boom FM
- Website: drumhellerdragons.ca

The Drumheller Dragons are a junior ice hockey team based in Drumheller, Alberta, Canada, with home games at the 1,800 seat Drumheller Memorial Arena. They are members of the Alberta Junior Hockey League (AJHL), which is a member of the Canadian Junior Hockey League (CJHL).

== History ==
The Drumheller Dragons entered the Alberta Junior Hockey League (AJHL) as an expansion team in the 2003–04 season and are the second franchise to represent the town of Drumheller following the Drumheller Falcons from 1979 to 1983.

The Drumheller Dragons have never won a league championship. Their best playoff run was in the 2013–14 season when the team reached the final playoff round before losing in four games straight to the Spruce Grove Saints.

Season	GP	W	L	T/O/S	Pts	GF	GA	Finish	Playoffs
2003–04	60	19	33	8	46	162	243	7th, South	Lost preliminary series, 0–3 vs. Olds Grizzlys
2004–05	64	23	29	12	58	187	228	6th South	Lost preliminary series, 0–3 vs. Calgary Canucks
2005–06	60	28	21	11	67	186	187	3rd South	Lost preliminary series, 2–3 vs. Canmore Eagles
2006–07	60	26	29	5	57	167	215	7th South	Lost preliminary series, 2–3 vs. Okotoks Oilers
2007–08	62	35	18	9	79	218	193	3rd South	Won Preliminary series, 3–0 vs. Brooks Bandits; Won quarterfinals, 4–1 vs. Okotoks Oilers; Lost semifinals, 1–4 vs. Camrose Kodiaks
2008–09	62	26	30	6	58	213	219	6th South	Lost div. quarter-finals, 2–3 vs. Olds Grizzlys
2009–10	60	17	37	6	40	157	269	8th South	Did not qualify
2010–11	60	21	31	8	50	145	192	6th South	Lost div. quarter-finals, 1–3 vs. Camrose Kodiaks
2011–12	60	17	37	6	40	162	256	7th South	Lost div. quarter-finals, 1–3 vs. Okotoks Oilers
2012–13	60	29	26	5	63	185	176	4th South	Won Div. Quarterfinals, 3– vs. Canmore Eagles; Lost div. semi-finals, 1–4 vs. Brooks Bandits
2013–14	60	35	20	5	75	213	179	3rd South	Won Div. Quarterfinals, 3–0 vs. Calgary Mustangs; Won Div. Semifinals, 4–1 vs. Canmore Eagles; Won Div. Finals, 4–1 vs. Brooks Bandits; Lost AJHL Finals, 0–4 vs. Spruce Grove Saints
2014–15	60	31	22	7	69	188	186	4th South	Won Div. Quarterfinals, 3–0 vs. Olds Grizzlys; Lost div. semi-finals, 1–4 vs. Camrose Kodiaks
2015–16	60	25	29	6	56	196	227	5th of 8 South; 10th of 16 AJHL	Lost div. quarter-finals, 1–3 vs. Canmore Eagles
2016–17	60	22	33	5	49	177	242	6th of 8 South; 11th of 16 AJHL	Lost div. quarter-finals, 2–3 vs. Calgary Canucks
2017–18	60	33	22	5	71	215	180	3rd of 8, South; 6th of 16, AJHL	Won Div. Quarterfinals, 3–1 vs. Calgary Canucks; Lost div. semi-finals, 2–4 vs. Brooks Bandits
2018–19	60	37	19	4	78	228	176	3rd of 8, South; 6th of 16, AJHL	Lost div. quarter-finals, 2–3 vs. Canmore Eagles
2019–20	58	37	18	3	77	249	168	3rd of 7, South; 5th of 15, AJHL	Won Div. Quarterfinals, 4–1 vs. Olds Grizzlys; Postseason cancelled
2020–21	10	5	5	0	20	30	34	Season cancelled	
2021–22	60	34	18	8	86	225	181	2nd of 8, South; 5th of 16, AJHL	Won div. quarter-finals, 4-2 Calgary Canucks; Lost Div Semifinal 2-4 Okotoks Oilers
2022–23	60	33	21	6	72	229	201	3rd of 8, South; 7th of 16, AJHL	Won div. quarter-finals, 4-2 Canmore Eagles; Lost Div Semifinal 3-4 Blackfalds Bulldogs
2023–24	57	26	23	8	60	190	181	5th of 11, AJHL	Won 1st round, 4-0 Bonnyville Pontiacs; Lost semifinal 4-1 Calgary Canucks
2024–25	54	32	18	4	68	198	149	3rd of 6 South Div; 4th of 12, AJHL	Won Div Semifinal, 4-3 Canmore Eagles; Lost Div final 0-4 Calgary Canucks
2025–26	55	28	20	7	63	189	180	2nd in division 6th overall	Won quarterfinal against Calgary (4–2); Lost semifinal against Canmore (4–0)

Source: "Drumheller Dragons statistics and history". hockeydb.com.

== See also ==
- List of ice hockey teams in Alberta
- Drumheller Miners
