= Drayton Valley Thunder =

Junior ice hockey team

- City: Drayton Valley, Alberta, Canada
- League: AJHL
- Division: South
- Founded: 1998
- Home arena: Team Auction Centre
- Colours: Green, black and white
- General manager: Jeff Truitt
- Head coach: Jeff Truitt
- Website: draytonvalleythunder.ca

The Drayton Valley Thunder is a junior ice hockey franchise in the Alberta Junior Hockey League (AJHL) based in Drayton Valley. The team plays its home games at the Team Auction Centre in Drayton Valley.

== History ==
The Drayton Valley Thunder debuted as an expansion franchise in the 1998–99 AJHL season. One year after finishing sixth in the South, ahead of only their fellow expansion team Crowsnest Pass Timberwolves, the Thunder improved in their second season and won the division. The addition of other expansion teams shifted the Thunder into the North Division in 2000–01, where they won another division title.

In 2002, the Thunder captured the AJHL championship Rogers Wireless Cup. The team went on to play against the BCHL championship Chilliwack Chiefs for the Pacific regional championship. The Chiefs won by a score of 4:2.

Season-by-season record
Season	GP	W	L	T/OTL	SOL	Pts	GF	GA	Finish	Playoffs
1998–99	62	20	36	—	6	46	181	284	6th South	Did not qualify
1999–00	64	40	18	—	6	86	268	204	1st South	Won quarter-finals, 4–1 vs. Bow Valley Eagles; Lost semi-finals, 3–4 vs. Camrose Kodiaks
2000–01	64	42	19	3	—	87	293	194	1st North	Won quarter-finals, 4–2 vs. Fort McMurray Oil Barons; Won semi-finals, 4–3 vs. Olds Grizzlys; Lost finals, 1–4 vs. Camrose Kodiaks
2001–02	64	44	17	3	—	91	300	198	2nd North	Won preliminary series, 3–0 vs. Fort Saskatchewan Traders; Won quarter-finals, 4–2 vs. Sherwood Park Crusaders; Won semi-finals, 4–0 vs. Olds Grizzlys; Won AJHL finals, 4–0 vs. Grande Prairie Storm; Lost Doyle Cup, 2–4 vs. Chilliwack Chiefs (BCHL)
2002–03	64	37	20	7	—	81	240	199	3rd North	Lost preliminary series, 2–4 vs. Grande Prairie Storm
2003–04	60	27	23	10	—	64	165	177	5th North	Won preliminary series, 3–0 vs. Sherwood Park Crusaders; Lost quarter-finals, 1–4 vs. Fort McMurray Oil Barons
2004–05	64	39	19	6	—	84	198	146	3rd North	Won preliminary series, 3–0 vs. Fort Saskatchewan Traders; Won quarter-finals, 4–2 vs. Spruce Grove Saints; Lost semi-finals, 2–4 vs. Fort McMurray Oil Barons
2005–06	60	38	16	6	—	82	203	158	2nd North	Won preliminary series, 3–0 vs. Lloydminster Bobcats; Lost quarter-finals, 3–4 vs. Spruce Grove Saints
2006–07	60	30	26	4	—	64	199	211	4th North	Lost preliminary series, 1–3 vs. Fort McMurray Oil Barons
2007–08	62	12	44	6	—	30	151	280	8th North	Did not qualify
2008–09	62	7	50	5	—	19	122	318	8th North	Did not qualify
2009–10	60	12	42	6	—	30	139	269	8th North	Did not qualify
2010–11	60	13	39	8	—	34	164	250	8th North	Did not qualify
2011–12	60	27	27	6	—	60	187	224	6th North	Won div. quarter-finals, 3–0 vs. Lloydminster Bobcats; Lost div. semi-finals, 0–4 vs. Spruce Grove Saints
2012–13	60	30	23	—	7	67	178	177	6th North	Lost div. quarter-finals, 1–3 vs. Bonnyville Pontiacs
2013–14	60	22	33	—	5	49	148	205	7th North	Lost div. quarter-finals, 1–3 vs. Fort McMurray Oil Barons
2014–15	60	24	24	—	12	60	161	191	6th North	Lost div. quarter-finals, 0–3 vs. Bonnyville Pontiacs
2015–16	60	23	33	—	4	50	150	242	6th North	Lost div. quarter-finals, 0–3 vs. Lloydminster Bobcats
2016–17	60	17	39	—	4	38	160	252	6th of 8, North; 11th of 16, AJHL	Lost div. quarter-finals, 0–3 vs. Spruce Grove Saints
2017–18	60	17	40	—	3	37	178	298	8th of 8, North; 16th of 16, AJHL	Did not qualify
2018–19	60	24	30	6	—	54	155	191	6th of 8, North; 12th of 16, AJHL	Lost div. quarter-finals, 1–3 vs. Spruce Grove Saints
2019–20	58	26	25	7	—	59	172	189	5th of 8, North; 9th of 15, AJHL	Won div. quarter-finals, 4–2 vs. Bonnyville Pontiacs; Postseason cancelled
2020–21	16	8	8	0	—	16	51	50	4th of 8, North; 8th of 15, AJHL	No postseason held
2021–22	60	33	17	10	—	76	203	188	4th of 8, North; 6th of 16, AJHL	Won div. quarter-finals, 4–1 vs. Lloydminster Bobcats; Won div. semi-finals, 4–2 vs. Fort McMurray Oil Barons; Lost div. finals, 0–4 vs. Spruce Grove Saints
2022–23	60	15	42	0	3	33	171	268	8th of 8, North; 16th of 16, AJHL	Did not qualify for postseason
2023–24	57	19	35	2	1	41	147	225	9th of 11, AJHL	Did not qualify for postseason
2024–25	54	23	24	4	3	53	169	207	5th of 6 Div South; 8th of 12, AJHL	Did not qualify for postseason

== NHL alumni ==
- Matt Berlin
- Clarke MacArthur
- Kael Mouillierat
- Darren Reid
- Ben Scrivens
- Nick Tarnasky

== See also ==
- List of ice hockey teams in Alberta

== Sources ==
- "AJHL Approves ownership change of Drayton Valley Thunder". ajhl.ca (Press release). Alberta Junior Hockey League. 12 December 2024.
- "AJHL approves ownership change of Drayton Valley Thunder". dailyheraldtribune.com. Postmedia. 12 December 2024.
- "Drayton Valley Thunder Accept Resignation of Head Coach and General Manager Geoff Walker". draytonvalleythunder.ca (Press release). Drayton Valley Thunder. 13 June 2025.
- "New ownership takes over helm of AJHL's Olds Grizzlys". cjhlhockey.com. Canadian Junior Hockey League. 2 April 2025.
- "Jeff Truitt named Thunder GM & head coach". ajhl.ca (Press release). Alberta Junior Hockey League. 2 July 2025.
