= Canmore Eagles =

Junior ice hockey team in Alberta, Canada

- City: Canmore, Alberta
- League: AJHL
- Division: South
- Founded: 1995
- Home arena: Canmore Recreation Centre
- Colours: Blue; Navy
- General manager: Andrew Milne
- Head coach: Andrew Milne
- Website: canmoreeagles.ca

Franchise history
- 1995–2001: Bow Valley Eagles
- Since 2001: Canmore Eagles

Championships
- League: 2026

The Canmore Eagles are a junior ice hockey club and franchise of the Alberta Junior Hockey League (AJHL) based in Canmore, Alberta. The team plays its home games at the Canmore Recreation Centre. The Eagles franchise was established for the 1995–96 season as the Bow Valley Eagles. The franchise was renamed as the Canmore Eagles prior to the 2001–02 season.

== History ==
The Canmore Eagles were founded as the Bow Valley Eagles in July 1993 by three Canmore-based businessmen: Fred Horbey, John Straw, and Ken Pauls Sr. The team wouldn't start play until its debut in the league during the 1995-96 AJHL season; then in 2001, the team was renamed to the Canmore Eagles.

The Eagles won their first AJHL championship during the 2025–26 AJHL season.

Statistics
Season	GP	W	L	T/OTL	SOL	Pts	GF	GA	Finish	Playoffs
1995–96	60	22	37	—	1	45	237	266	9th Overall	Did not qualify
1996–97	60	37	21	—	2	76	224	214	2nd Overall	Lost quarterfinals, 2–4 vs. Grande Prairie Storm
1997–98	60	28	31	—	1	52	237	236	7th Overall	Lost quarterfinals, 1–4 vs. Grande Prairie Storm
1998–99	62	23	35	—	4	50	222	290	5th South	Lost preliminary series, 0–2 vs. Camrose Kodiaks
1999–00	64	29	32	—	3	61	278	296	5th South	Won Div. Quarterfinals, 3–0 vs. Calgary Royals; Lost div. semi-finals, 1–4 vs. Drayton Valley Thunder
2000–01	64	27	30	7	—	61	308	307	5th South	Lost preliminary series, 2–3 vs. Crowsnest Pass Timberwolves
2001–02	64	47	14	3	—	97	297	209	1st South	Won quarterfinals, 4–3 vs. Calgary Royals; Lost semifinals, 3–4 vs. Grande Prairie Storm
2002–03	64	43	19	2	—	88	259	215	1st South	Won quarterfinals, 4–0 vs. Crowsnest Pass Timberwolves; Lost semifinals, 1–4 vs. Camrose Kodiaks
2003–04	60	30	26	4	—	64	215	232	5th South	Lost preliminary series, 0–3 vs. Calgary Royals
2004–05	64	28	25	11	—	67	169	201	4th South	Won Preliminary series, 3–0 vs. Calgary Royals; Lost quarterfinals, 0–4 vs. Camrose Kodiaks
2005–06	60	25	30	5	—	55	146	172	6th South	Won Preliminary series, 3–2 vs. Drumheller Dragons; Lost quarterfinals, 2–4 vs. Brooks Bandits
2006–07	60	29	28	3	—	61	179	190	3rd South	Lost preliminary series, 1–3 vs. Olds Grizzlys
2007–08	62	25	29	8	—	58	199	225	5th South	Lost preliminary series, 0–3 vs. Olds Grizzlys
2008–09	62	19	39	4	—	42	185	290	7th South	Lost div. quarter-finals, 0–3 vs. Okotoks Oilers
2009–10	60	26	26	8	—	52	202	217	6th South	Won Div. Quarterfinals, 3–0 vs. Olds Grizzlys; Lost div. semi-finals, 2–4 vs. Okotoks Oilers
2010–11	60	20	36	4	—	44	189	246	7th South	Lost div. quarter-finals, 0–3 vs. Brooks Bandits
2011–12	60	18	39	3	—	39	160	257	8th South	Did not qualify
2012–13	60	24	30	6	—	54	155	222	5th South	Lost div. quarter-finals, 0–3 vs. Drumheller Dragons
2013–14	60	32	25	3	—	67	175	186	5th South	Won Div. Quarterfinals, 3–1 vs. Camrose Kodiaks; Lost div. semi-finals, 1–4 vs. Drumheller Dragons
2014–15	60	27	31	2	—	56	194	230	6th South	Lost div. quarter-finals, 0–3 vs. Okotoks Oilers
2015–16	60	26	27	7	—	59	205	240	4th of 8, South; 9th of 16, AJHL	Won Div. Quarterfinals, 3–1 vs. Drumheller Dragons; Lost div. semi-finals, 0–4 vs. Brooks Bandits
2016–17	60	36	18	6	—	78	250	199	2nd of 8, South; 6th of 16, AJHL	Lost div. quarter-finals, 0–3 vs. Olds Grizzlys
2017–18	60	21	37	2	—	44	180	233	7th of 8, South; 14th of 16, AJHL	Lost div. quarter-finals, 0–3 vs. Brooks Bandits
2018–19	60	30	25	5	—	65	233	234	6th of 8, South; 10th of 16, AJHL	Won Div. Quarterfinals, 3–2 vs. Drumheller Dragons; Lost div. semi-finals, 1–4 vs. Brooks Bandits
2019–20	58	23	31	4	—	50	207	248	5th of 7, South; 10th of 15, AJHL	Lost div. quarter-finals, 3–4 vs. Camrose Kodiaks
2020–21	2	2	0	0	0	4	6	4	Season cancelled	
2021–22	60	20	31	9	—	49	150	237	6th in division 14th overall	Won quarterfinal against Camrose (4:1); Lost semifinal against Brooks (4:0)
2022–23	60	24	32	2	2	52	181	237	6th in division 14th overall	Lost quarterfinal against Okotoks (4:2)
2023–24	57	25	29	2	1	53	175	204	7th overall	Won quarterfinal against Lloydminster (4:2); Lost semifinal against Whitecourt (4:3)
2024–25	54	35	12	5	2	77	206	142	2nd in division 3rd overall	Lost quarterfinal against Drumheller (4:3)
2025–26	55	32	19	3	1	68	209	170	1st in division 4th overall	Won quarterfinal against Calgary (4:2); Won semifinal against Drumheller (4:0); Won AJHL Championship against Whitecourt (4:1)

Source: "2025–26 AJHL regular season standings". ajhl.ca.

== NHL alumni ==
The following former Eagles have gone on to play in the National Hockey League (NHL):

- Dan Blackburn
- Darcy Campbell
- Shane Joseph
- Brayden Point

== See also ==
- List of ice hockey teams in Alberta
