= Bonnyville Pontiacs =

- City: Bonnyville, Alberta
- League: AJHL
- Division: North
- Founded: 1991
- Home arena: R. J. Lalonde Arena
- Colours: Gold, red, black
- General manager: Chad Nelson
- Head coach: Chad Mercier (2025-26)
- Website: bonnyvillepontiacs.ca

The Bonnyville Pontiacs are a Junior A ice hockey team in the Alberta Junior Hockey League. They play in Bonnyville, Alberta, Canada at the R. J. Lalonde Arena.

== History ==
The Pontiacs entered the Alberta Junior Hockey League (AJHL) as the league's ninth team for the 1991–92 season, adopting the Pontiacs name and logo originally used by the Senior A team of the same name in the 1950s.

The franchise was awarded, along with the 1991–92 all-star game, on June 1, 1991, leaving just two months for the new organization to find staff and players before the start of the season. The short off-season hampered the team on the ice, as it finished a distant last place in the standings and missed the playoffs. The Pontiacs remained in last for two more seasons before qualifying for the postseason for the first time in 1995. The team continued to finish in the bottom half of the standings for most of the next two decades.

The Pontiacs were coached by Mario Pouliot for the 2022–23 season, and the team reached the third round of the playoffs for the second time in franchise history.

== Season-by-season record ==
Note: GP = Games played, W = Wins, L = Losses, T/OTL = Ties/Overtime losses, SOL = Shootout losses, Pts = Points, GF = Goals for, GA = Goals against

Season	GP	W	L	T/OTL	SOL	Pts	GF	GA	Standing	Playoffs
1991–92	60	8	51	—	1	17	186	399	9th AJHL	Did not qualify
1992–93	56	13	42	—	1	27	192	324	9th AJHL	Did not qualify
1993–94	56	15	37	—	4	34	209	368	9th AJHL	Did not qualify
1994–95	56	24	29	—	3	51	219	278	7th AJHL	Lost quarterfinals, 1–4 vs. Calgary Canucks
1995–96	60	27	30	—	3	57	243	257	7th AJHL	Lost quarterfinals, 1–4 vs. Olds Grizzlys
1996–97	60	27	30	—	3	57	242	270	8th AJHL	Lost quarterfinals, 2–4 vs. Calgary Canucks
1997–98	60	20	36	—	4	44	204	266	11th AJHL	Did not qualify
1998–99	62	33	29	—	0	66	282	261	5th North	Lost preliminary series, 0–2 vs. Grande Prairie Storm
1999–00	64	34	26	—	4	72	251	230	5th North	Won preliminary series, 3–0 vs. Grande Prairie Storm; Lost quarterfinals, 1–4 vs. Fort McMurray Oil Barons
2000–01	64	17	38	9	—	43	194	307	8th North	Did not qualify
2001–02	64	20	43	1	—	41	176	284	8th North	Did not qualify
2002–03	64	27	29	8	—	62	207	243	6th North	Lost preliminary series, 0–4 vs. Sherwood Park Crusaders
2003–04	60	27	25	8	—	62	189	172	6th North	Lost preliminary series, 2–3 vs. Fort McMurray Oil Barons
2004–05	64	36	17	11	—	83	218	189	4th North	Lost preliminary series, 1–3 vs. Grande Prairie Storm
2005–06	60	38	19	3	—	79	240	185	5th North	Won preliminary series, 3–1 vs. Grande Prairie Storm; Lost quarterfinals, 0–4 vs. Fort McMurray Oil Barons
2006–07	60	24	29	7	—	55	173	208	6th North	Lost preliminary series, 2–3 vs. Spruce Grove Saints
2007–08	62	34	21	7	—	75	211	166	4th North	Won preliminary series, 3–2 vs. Sherwood Park Crusaders; Lost quarterfinals, 2–4 vs. Fort McMurray Oil Barons
2008–09	62	35	22	5	—	75	215	187	4th North	Lost preliminary series, 1–3 vs. Fort McMurray Oil Barons
2009–10	60	27	29	4	—	58	175	190	5th North	Won preliminary series, 3–0 vs. Sherwood Park Crusaders; Lost quarterfinals, 0–4 vs. Spruce Grove Saints
2010–11	60	35	16	9	—	79	198	150	3rd North	Won preliminary series, 3–0 vs. Sherwood Park Crusaders; Lost quarterfinals, 2–4 vs. Fort McMurray Oil Barons
2011–12	60	34	20	6	—	74	187	158	5th North	Lost division quarterfinals, 2–3 vs. Sherwood Park Crusaders
2012–13	60	32	19	—	9	73	177	170	3rd North	Won division quarterfinals, 3–1 vs. Drayton Valley Thunder; Lost division semifinals, 1–4 vs. Whitecourt Wolverines
2013–14	60	26	28	—	6	58	182	212	5th North	Lost division quarterfinals, 0–3 vs. Sherwood Park Crusaders
2014–15	60	30	19	—	11	71	197	184	3rd North	Won division quarterfinals, 3–0 vs. Drayton Valley Thunder; Won division semifinals, 4–2 vs. Lloydminster Bobcats; Lost division finals, 2–4 vs. Spruce Grove Saints
2015–16	60	40	11	—	9	89	245	163	3rd of 8, North; 5th of 16, AJHL	Lost division quarterfinals, 1–3 vs. Sherwood Park Crusaders
2016–17	60	37	19	—	4	78	228	159	4th of 8, North; 5th of 16, AJHL	Won division quarterfinals, 3–1 vs. Sherwood Park Crusaders; Lost division semifinals, 1–4 vs. Fort McMurray Oil Barons
2017–18	60	20	32	—	8	48	179	216	7th of 8, North; 13th of 16, AJHL	Lost division quarterfinals, 0–3 vs. Fort McMurray Oil Barons
2018–19	60	41	15	4	—	86	241	145	2nd of 8, North; 3rd of 16, AJHL	Won division quarterfinals, 3–0 vs. Whitecourt Wolverines; Lost division semifinals, 0–4 vs. Spruce Grove Saints
2019–20	58	33	21	4	—	70	213	186	4th of 8, North; 7th of 15, AJHL	Lost division quarterfinals, 2–4 vs. Drayton Valley Thunder
2020–21	16	8	6	1	1	18	46	42	Season cancelled due to covid-19 pandemic	
2021–22	60	36	16	8	—	80	221	177	3rd of 8, North; 4th of 16, AJHL	Lost division quarterfinals, 2–4 vs. Whitecourt Wolverines
2022–23	60	36	21	2	1	75	248	206	3rd of 8, North; 5th of 16, AJHL	Won division quarterfinals, 4-2 vs. Lloydminster Bobcats; Won division quarterfinals, 4-1 vs. Whitecourt Wolverines; Lost division finals 1-4 Spruce Grove Saints
2023–24	57	30	23	4	-	64	202	73	4th of 11, AJHL	Lost quarterfinals, 0-4 vs. Drumheller Dragons
2024–25	57	20	30	1	3	44	153	209	5th of 6, North; 10th of 12, AJHL	Did not qualify
2025–26	55	27	24	3	1	58	192	185	5th of 6, North; 8th of 12, AJHL	Did not qualify

== NHL alumni ==
The following former Pontiacs have gone on to play in the NHL:

- Matt Climie
- Justin Fontaine
- Jon Kalinski
- Mark Letestu
- Bobby McMann
- Brinson Pasichnuk
- Nolan Pratt
- Spencer Foo
- Grant Stevenson
- Harry York

The following former Pontiacs have gone on to play for the Canada national women's ice hockey team:

- Shannon Szabados

== See also ==
- List of ice hockey teams in Alberta
