= Devin Setoguchi =

Canadian ice hockey player (born 1987)

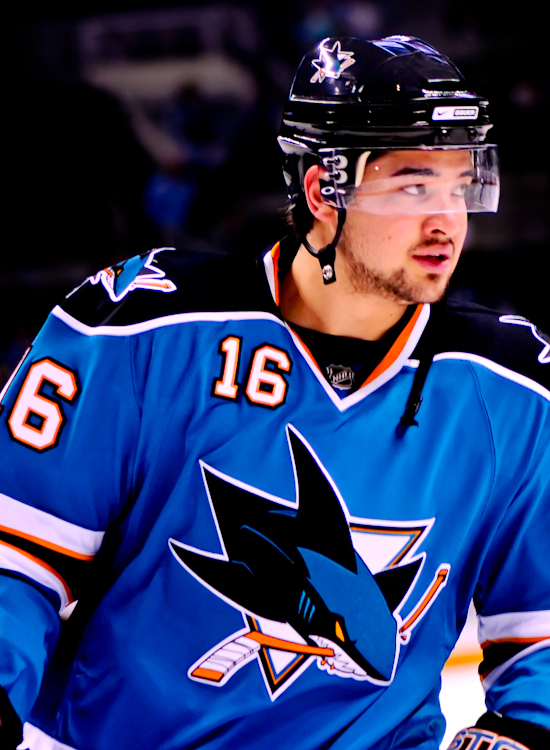
- Setoguchi with the San Jose Sharks in 2008
- Born: January 1, 1987 (age 39) Taber, Alberta, Canada
- Height: 6 ft 0 in (183 cm)
- Weight: 205 lb (93 kg; 14 st 9 lb)
- Position: Right wing
- Shot: Right
- Played for: San Jose Sharks; Minnesota Wild; Winnipeg Jets; Calgary Flames; HC Davos; Los Angeles Kings; Adler Mannheim
- NHL draft: 8th overall, 2005; San Jose Sharks
- Playing career: 2007–2018

Devin Setoguchi (born January 1, 1987) is a Canadian former professional ice hockey right winger. Setoguchi is half-Yonsei (fourth-generation) Japanese Canadian and a Sports California/Sharks Playoff live TV analyst. He is known by the nickname The Gooch. He was drafted by the San Jose Sharks in the first round, eighth overall, in the 2005 NHL entry draft and has also played with the Minnesota Wild, Winnipeg Jets, and Calgary Flames. In September 2015, he failed to catch on with the Toronto Maple Leafs after being initially signed to a professional tryout (PTO) contract during training camp. He eventually signed with HC Davos of the Swiss National League A where he spent the 2015–16 season. In September 2016, he made the Los Angeles Kings out of training camp and signed a one-year, two-way contract for the 2016–17 season.

== Playing career ==
=== Junior ===
Setoguchi played one season with the now-defunct Crowsnest Pass Timberwolves of the Alberta Junior Hockey League (AJHL). He then spent three seasons with the Saskatoon Blades of the Western Hockey League (WHL). In the 2005–06 season, he finished seventh in the league in scoring with 83 points. In the 2006–07 season, he joined the Prince George Cougars.

=== Professional ===
==== San Jose Sharks ====
Setoguchi was expected to begin the 2007–08 season in the NHL with the San Jose Sharks. However, he was injured and placed on injured reserve. He started the season with the Worcester Sharks, San Jose's American Hockey League (AHL) affiliate located in Worcester, Massachusetts. He played two games with Worcester before getting recalled to San Jose.

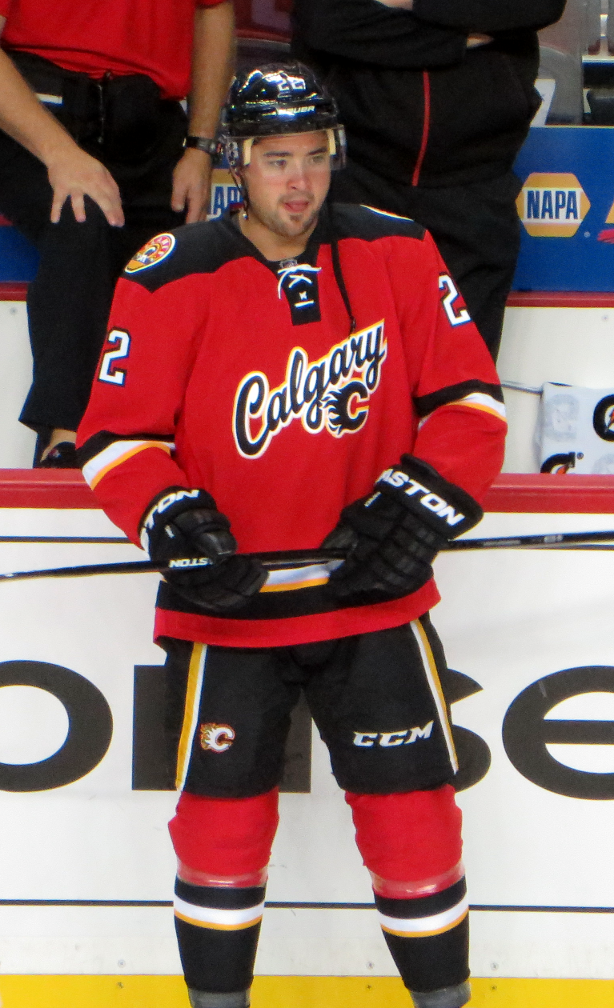
Setoguchi during his short tenure with the Flames.

Setoguchi scored his first two regular-season NHL goals on October 29, 2007, in his first NHL game, playing against the Dallas Stars. He became the first Sharks rookie ever to score two goals in his first NHL game. On December 28, 2007, Setoguchi was re-assigned to Worcester.

On January 18, 2008, the Sharks recalled Setoguchi back to San Jose. The following day, San Jose lost to the Detroit Red Wings 6–3, in which Setoguchi scored a powerplay goal. On January 25, 2008, Setoguchi was sent back down to Worcester to get additional playing time during the NHL All-Star Game break, then recalled back to San Jose on January 28, 2008. On April 15, 2008, Setoguchi appeared in his first Stanley Cup playoff game, where he assisted on the game-tying goal in the third period. The Sharks went on to score one more goal to win that game.

During the 2008–09 season, Setoguchi spent most of his ice-time with teammates Joe Thornton and Patrick Marleau on San Jose's first line. On April 25, 2009, in the fifth game of the first round of the playoffs, Setoguchi scored his first playoff goal in the second period, helping the Sharks to a 3–2 victory over the Anaheim Ducks.

In the 2010–11 season with the Sharks, on February 19, 2011, Setoguchi scored his first ever NHL hat-trick in a 4–0 win against the Colorado Avalanche. On April 19, 2011, Setoguchi scored the game winner in overtime against the Los Angeles Kings to make the first-round playoff series two games to one. On May 4, 2011, Setoguchi completed a hat-trick in Game 3 of the Western Conference Semifinals against the Detroit Red Wings by scoring an overtime goal to give the Sharks a three games to none lead in the series.

==== Minnesota Wild ====
During the 2011 NHL entry draft, Setoguchi, along with Charlie Coyle and a first-round draft pick, was traded to the Minnesota Wild in exchange for Brent Burns and second-round pick in the 2012 NHL entry draft. This trade happened only one day after Setoguchi signed a three-year contract extension with the Sharks. On January 17, 2012, Setoguchi played his 300th career NHL game.

On November 6, 2012, Setoguchi signed with the Ontario Reign of the ECHL during the 2012–13 NHL lockout. Setoguchi was the first player on an NHL contract to join the Reign's roster. Setoguchi debuted with the Reign the next day against the San Francisco Bulls.

==== Winnipeg Jets and Calgary Flames ====
On July 5, 2013, Setoguchi was traded to the Winnipeg Jets for a second-round pick in the 2014 NHL Draft. In one season with the Jets, Setoguchi scored 27 points in 75 games.

On August 23, 2014, the Calgary Flames announced they had signed Setoguchi to a one-year contract. On November 27, 2014, after skating 12 NHL games with no points, Setoguchi cleared waivers and was assigned to the Adirondack Flames of the AHL. He remained with Adirondack for the remainder of the season, playing just 19 games and scoring 10 points.

==== HC Davos ====
The Flames did not offer a contract extension, and following the end of the 2014–15 season, he became an unrestricted free agent. On August 11, 2015, Glen Campbell of CTV Sports reported Setoguchi claims to have attended rehab and that he has been "clean and sober for five months" with hopes of signing with an NHL team. On August 24, 2015, the Toronto Maple Leafs reportedly signed him to a professional tryout contract. He was later released by the Leafs following the conclusion of training camp on September 27, 2015.

On October 6, 2015, he signed with HC Davos of the Swiss top-flight National League A (NLA). In the 2015–16 season, Setoguchi got his career back on track in contributing with 24 points in 30 games with Davos.

==== Los Angeles Kings ====
With the ambition to make a return to the NHL, Setoguchi returned as a free agent in the off-season to North America and agreed to a professional try-out contract with the Los Angeles Kings on September 7, 2016. After a successful training camp and pre-season, Setoguchi was signed by the Kings to a one-year, two-way contract on the eve of the 2016–17 season on October 11, 2016.

==== Adler Mannheim ====
On April 21, 2017, he signed with Deutsche Eishockey Liga (DEL) side Adler Mannheim, being handed an optional two-year contract by the Adler organization.

== Career statistics ==
=== Regular season and playoffs ===
			Regular season					Playoffs
Season	Team	League	GP	G	A	Pts	PIM	GP	G	A	Pts	PIM
2002–03	Crowsnest Pass Timberwolves	AJHL	62	21	18	39	77	4	2	2	4	6
2003–04	Saskatoon Blades	WHL	66	13	18	31	53	—	—	—	—	—
2004–05	Saskatoon Blades	WHL	69	33	31	64	34	4	0	1	1	0
2005–06	Saskatoon Blades	WHL	65	36	47	83	69	10	8	4	12	8
2006–07	Prince George Cougars	WHL	55	36	29	65	55	15	11	10	21	24
2007–08	San Jose Sharks	NHL	44	11	6	17	8	9	1	1	2	2
2007–08	Worcester Sharks	AHL	23	8	11	19	25	—	—	—	—	—
2008–09	San Jose Sharks	NHL	81	31	34	65	25	6	1	2	3	2
2009–10	San Jose Sharks	NHL	70	20	16	36	19	15	5	4	9	6
2010–11	San Jose Sharks	NHL	72	22	19	41	37	18	7	3	10	12
2011–12	Minnesota Wild	NHL	69	19	17	36	28	—	—	—	—	—
2012–13	Ontario Reign	ECHL	10	4	9	13	2	—	—	—	—	—
2012–13	Minnesota Wild	NHL	48	13	14	27	20	5	1	0	1	0
2013–14	Winnipeg Jets	NHL	75	11	16	27	22	—	—	—	—	—
2014–15	Calgary Flames	NHL	12	0	0	0	4	—	—	—	—	—
2014–15	Adirondack Flames	AHL	19	3	7	10	4	—	—	—	—	—
2015–16	HC Davos	NLA	30	11	13	24	4	7	5	3	8	10
2016–17	Los Angeles Kings	NHL	45	4	8	12	14	—	—	—	—	—
2016–17	Ontario Reign	AHL	9	0	3	3	10	—	—	—	—	—
2017–18	Adler Mannheim	DEL	47	11	13	24	26	5	2	0	2	2
NHL totals			516	131	130	261	177	53	15	10	25	22

=== International ===
Year	Team	Event	Result	GP	G	A	Pts	PIM
2004	Canada Pacific	U17	2nd place, silver medalist(s)	6	4	5	9	20
2004	Canada	U18	1st place, gold medalist(s)	4	0	3	3	4
2005	Canada	WJC18	2nd place, silver medalist(s)	6	4	2	6	7
Junior totals				16	8	10	18	31

== Awards and honours ==
Award	Year
WHL
East Second All-Star Team	2006

Awards and achievements
Preceded by Lukáš Kašpar	San Jose Sharks first-round draft pick 2005	Succeeded by Ty Wishart
