= Centerfire Place =

Coordinates: 56.730807°N 111.437717°W

Centerfire Place (formerly Casman Centre and Thickwood Heights Arena) is located in Fort McMurray, Alberta, Canada and is best known as the home of the Alberta Junior Hockey League's Fort McMurray Oil Barons. The facility houses a 1,537 seat arena, multi-purpose room, amphitheatre, and pottery guild.

Major sporting events held at the arena include the 2004 and 2023 Arctic Winter Games and the 2000 Doyle and Royal Bank Cups, as well as a Hockey Canada World Junior Red and White Game in the summer of 2011. The arena also hosted the 2015 Canadian Ringette Championships. Concerts have been played there by bands such as Streetheart, Our Lady Peace, Great Big Sea, Nazareth, Collective Soul, and Theory of a Deadman. It was announced on 31 July 2026, it will host the Canadian Junior Hockey League’s 2027 Centennial Cup in May 2027
