= Grande Prairie Storm =

Ice hockey team in Alberta, Canada

- City: Grande Prairie, Alberta
- League: AJHL
- Division: North
- Founded: 1966
- Home arena: Bonnetts Energy Centre
- Colours: Yellow, Navy blue, and White
- General manager: Mark Bomersback
- Head coach: Chris Schmidt
- Website: grandeprairiestorm.ca

Franchise history
- 1966–1972: Grande Prairie Jr. Athletics
- 1972–1989: Grande Prairie North Stars
- 1991–1995: Grande Prairie Chiefs
- 1995–present: Grande Prairie Storm

The Grande Prairie Storm is a junior A ice hockey team in the Alberta Junior Hockey League (AJHL) based in Grande Prairie, Alberta, Canada, with home games at Bonnetts Energy Centre.

== History ==
The organization was founded in 1966 as the Junior Athletics as a member of the Peace Junior B Hockey League (PJHL). The team rebranded around 1972 as the Grande Prairie North Stars. When the Quesnel Millionaires and Prince George Spruce Kings joined the league in 1975, the league became the Peace-Cariboo Junior Hockey League (PCJHL). In 1980, the league and teams were promoted to Junior A. The North Stars were financially struggling and sat out two seasons from 1989 to 1991. They came back as the Grande Prairie Chiefs in 1991, but the league had brought in teams from the Kootenay International Junior Hockey League and reformed as the Rocky Mountain Junior Hockey League (RMJHL).

In 1995, with the Chiefs continuing to have financial difficulties, a community-led group bought the team with the goal of paying off its $150,000 in debts and restoring junior A hockey to prominence in the Peace Country. The team rebranded as the Grande Prairie Storm and moved to a brand new arena, the Canada Games Arena, built for the 1995 Canada Winter Games.

In 1996, the Storm moved from the RMJHL to the Alberta Junior Hockey League (AJHL). The Storm qualified for the AJHL post season in each of its first 18 consecutive seasons before missing in 2014. In 2004, the Storm won their first AJHL championship. They also hosted the 2004 Royal Bank Cup national junior A championship tournament that season, where they lost in the semifinals.

The Storm have been a major success off the ice as well as the franchise perennially leads the AJHL in attendance, and often leads the entire Canadian Junior A Hockey League in attendance. The Storm broke the previous attendance record for the Royal Bank Cup by over 9000 fans in 2004.

== Season-by-season record ==
Note: GP = Games played, W = Wins, L = Losses, T/OTL = Ties/Overtime losses, SOL = Shootout losses, Pts = Points, GF = Goals for, GA = Goals against

Season	GP	W	L	T/OTL	SOL	Pts	GF	GA	Finish	Playoffs
1975–76	39	28	11	0	—	56	217	159	1st, PC Jr. B	Lost Finals, 1–4 vs. Prince George Spruce Kings
1976–77	40	17	23	0	—	34	179	216	4th, PC Jr. B	
1977–78	40	21	19	0	—	42	203	164	3rd, PC Jr. B	
1978–79	35	13	21	1	—	27	231	254	5th, PC Jr. B	
1979–80	48	27	21	0	—	54	296	239	5th, PC Jr. B	Lost Semifinals vs. Fort St. John Golden Hawks
1980–81	40	17	23	0	—	34	180	207	5th, PCJHL	Did not qualify
1981–82	56	37	19	0	—	78	367	234	2nd, PCJHL	Won Semifinals, 4–0 vs. Dawson Creek Kodiaks; Lost Finals, 1–4 vs. Prince George Spruce Kings
1982–83	Did not participate									
1983–84	50	22	27	1	—	45	278	273	3rd, PCJHL	Lost Semifinals, 0–4 vs. Williams Lake Mustangs
1984–85	48	20	27	1	—	41	248	274	4th, PCJHL	Lost Semifinals, 2–4 vs. Fort St. John Huskies
1985–86	50	26	24	0	—	52	281	288	4th, PCJHL	Lost Semifinals, 0–4 vs. Prince George Spruce Kings
1986–87	48	28	20	0	—	56	284	247	3rd, PCJHL	Won Semifinals, 4–3 vs. Fort St. John Huskies; Lost Finals, 2–4 vs. Quesnel Millionaires
1987–88	50	38	12	0	—	76	346	189	1st, PCJHL	Won Semifinals, 4–1 vs. Williams Lake Mustangs; Won League Finals, 4–3 vs. Prince George Spruce Kings; PCJHL Championship; Lost Mowat Cup, 0–2 vs. Vernon Lakers (BCJHL)
1988–89	52	40	12	0	—	80	333	180	1st, PCJHL	Won Semifinals, 4–1 vs. Prince George Spruce Kings; Lost Finals, 1–4 vs. Williams Lake Mustangs
1989–1991	Did not participate									
1991–92	52	13	37	2	—	28	211	355	5th, Peace-Cariboo	Did not qualify
1992–93	52	22	30	0	—	44	260	339	3rd, Peace-Cariboo	Lost Conf. Semifinals, 0–4 vs. Prince George Spruce Kings
1993–94	52	34	17	1	—	69	270	223	3rd, Peace-Cariboo	Lost Conf. Semifinals, 3–4 vs. Fort St. John Huskies
1994–95	52	24	25	3	—	51	253	272	2nd, Peace-Cariboo	Lost Conf. Semifinals, 2–4 vs. Williams Lake Mustangs
1995–96	58	40	18	0	—	80	317	228	1st, Peace-Cariboo	Lost Conf. Semifinals, 2–4 vs. Quesnel Millionaires
1996–97	60	28	27	—	5	88	236	227	5th, AJHL	Won Quarterfinals, 4–2 vs. Bow Valley Eagles; Lost Semifinals, 1–4 vs. Calgary Canucks
1997–98	60	42	15	—	3	87	277	205	2nd, AJHL	Won Quarterfinals, 4–1 vs. Bow Valley Eagles; Lost Semifinals, 1–4 vs. Fort Saskatchewan Traders
1998–99	62	33	22	—	7	73	238	203	4th, North	Won Div. Quarterfinals, 2–0 vs. Bonnyville Pontiacs; Lost Quarterfinals, 1–4 vs. St. Albert Saints
1999–00	64	36	26	—	2	74	218	203	4th, North	Lost Div. Quarterfinals, 0–3 vs. Bonnyville Pontiacs
2000–01	64	39	22	3	—	81	279	244	2nd, North	Won Div. Quarterfinals, 3–2 vs. Fort Saskatchewan Traders; Won Div. Semifinals, 4–1 vs. St. Albert Saints; Lost Div. Finals, 1–4 vs. Camrose Kodiaks
2001–02	64	34	21	9	—	77	233	214	5th, North	Won Div. Quarterfinals, 3–0 vs. Fort McMurray Oil Barons; Won Div. Semifinals, 4–2 vs. St. Albert Saints; Won Div. Finals, 4–3 vs. Canmore Eagles; Lost Championship, 0–4 vs. Drayton Valley Thunder
2002–03	64	40	23	1	—	81	267	193	4th, North	Won Div. Quarterfinals, 4–2 vs. Drayton Valley Thunder; Lost Div. Semifinals, 1–4 vs. St. Albert Saints
2003–04	60	40	14	6	—	86	241	139	1st, North	Won Div. Semifinals, 4–1 vs. Lloydminster Blazers; Won Div. Finals, 4–2 vs. Olds Grizzlys; Won League Finals, 4–1 vs. Fort McMurray Oil Barons; AJHL Championship; Lost Doyle Cup, 1–4 vs. Nanaimo Clippers (BCHL)
2004–05	64	38	21	5	—	81	216	160	5th, North	Won Div. Quarterfinals, 3–1 vs. Bonnyville Pontiacs; Lost Div. Semifinals, 1–4 vs. Fort McMurray Oil Barons
2005–06	60	38	18	4	—	80	211	148	4th, North	Lost Div. Quarterfinals, 1–3 vs. Bonnyville Pontiacs
2006–07	60	41	15	4	—	86	247	176	2nd, North	Won Div. Quarterfinals, 3–0 vs. Sherwood Park Crusaders; Won Div. Semifinals, 4–1 vs. Spruce Grove Saints; Lost Div. Finals, 2–4 vs. Camrose Kodiaks
2007–08	62	38	18	6	—	82	207	161	2nd, North	Won Div. Quarterfinals, 3–2 vs. St. Albert Steel; Lost Div. Semifinals, 3–4 vs. Spruce Grove Saints
2008–09	62	42	15	5	—	89	228	134	2nd, North	Won Div. Quarterfinals, 3–1 vs. Lloydminster Bobcats; Won Div. Semifinals, 4–2 vs. Sherwood Park Crusaders; Won Div. Finals, 4–1 vs. Brooks Bandits; Won League Finals, 4–0 vs. Spruce Grove Saints; AJHL Championship; Lost Doyle Cup, 0–4 vs. Vernon Vipers (BCHL)
2009–10	60	40	17	4	—	83	233	174	2nd, North	Won Div. Quarterfinals, 3–1 vs. Lloydminster Bobcats; Lost Div. Semifinals, 1–4 vs. Fort McMurray Oil Barons
2010–11	60	34	22	4	—	72	188	157	4th North	Lost Div. Quarterfinals, 2–3 vs. Lloydminster Bobcats
2011–12	60	21	35	4	—	46	169	221	7th North	Lost Div. Quarterfinals, 2–3 vs. Fort McMurray Oil Barons
2012–13	60	35	21	4	—	74	185	156	2nd North	Lost Div. Quarterfinals, 1–3 vs. Sherwood Park Crusaders
2013–14	60	21	36	3	—	45	155	220	8th North	Did not qualify
2014–15	60	15	41	4	—	34	119	245	8th North	Did not qualify
2015–16	60	11	45	4	—	26	138	302	8th North	Did not qualify
2016–17	60	15	38	7	1	37	146	153	7th of 8, North; 14th of 16, AJHL	Lost Div. Quarterfinals, 0–3 vs. Whitecourt Wolverines
2017–18	60	28	29	—	3	59	212	225	4th of 8, North; 8th of 16, AJHL	Won Div. Quarterfinals, 3–2 vs. Sherwood Park Crusaders; Lost Div. Semifinals, 0–4 vs. Spruce Grove Saints
2018–19	60	30	26	4	—	64	208	215	5th of 8, North; 11th of 16, AJHL	Lost Div. Quarterfinals, 1–3 vs. Fort McMurray Oil Barons
2019–20	58	18	33	7	—	43	139	198	7th of 8, North; 12th of 15, AJHL	Lost Div. Quarterfinals, 2–4 vs. Spruce Grove Saints
2020–21	18	9	8	1	—	19	52	57	Season cancelled due to COVID-19 pandemic	
2021–22	60	22	30	8	—	52	183	237	8th of 8, North; 12th of 16, AJHL	Did Not Qualify for Post Season
2022–23	60	19	33	5	3	46	153	224	7th of 8, North; 14th of 16, AJHL	Lost Div. Quarterfinals, 0–4 Wolverines
2023–24	57	24	26	4	3	55	173	191	6th of 11, AJHL	Lost Div. Quarterfinals, 2–4 Canucks
2024–25	54	30	17	1	6	67	209	157	2nd of 6 Nor Div; 6th of 12, AJHL	Won Div. Semifinals, 4-0 Bobcats; Won Div. Finals, 4-0 Wolverines; Lost League finals 0-4 Canucks; Canucks National Host-Storm advance

=== Junior A National Championship ===
The National Junior A Championship, known as the Centennial Cup and formerly as the Royal Bank Cup or RBC Cup, is the postseason tournament for the Canadian national championship for Junior A hockey teams that are members of the Canadian Junior Hockey League. The tournament consists of the regional Junior A champions and a previously selected host team. Since 1990, the national championship has used a five-team tournament format when the regional qualifiers were designated as the ANAVET Cup (Western), Doyle Cup (Pacific), Dudley Hewitt Cup (Central), and Fred Page Cup (Eastern). From 2013 to 2017, the qualifiers were the Dudley Hewitt Cup (Central), Fred Page Cup (Eastern), and the Western Canada Cup champions and runners-up.

The tournament begins with round-robin play between the five teams followed by the top four teams playing a semifinal game, with the top seed facing the fourth seed and the second facing the third. The winners of the semifinals then face each other in final game for the national championship. In some years, the losers of the semifinal games face each other for a third place game.

Year	Round-robin	Record	Standing	Semifinal	Third place game	Championship game
2004; Host	W, 5–3 vs. Kindersley Klippers (Western); W, 4–2 vs. Aurora Tigers (Central); W, 7–2 vs. Nepean Raiders (Eastern); L, 2–7 vs. Nanaimo Clippers (Pacific)	3–1	1st of 5	L, 3–4 vs. Kindersley Klippers	Not played	—

== Revised format 2022 ==
Canadian Jr. A National Championships
Maritime Junior Hockey League, Quebec Junior Hockey League, Central Canada Hockey League, Ontario Junior Hockey League, Northern Ontario Junior Hockey League, Superior International Junior Hockey League, Manitoba Junior Hockey League, Saskatchewan Junior Hockey League, Alberta Junior Hockey League, and Host. The BCHL declared itself an independent league and there is no BC representative.
Round-robin play in two 5-team pools with top three in pool advancing to determine a Champion.

Year	Round-robin	Record	Standing	Quarterfinal	Semifinal	Championship
2025	L, Greater Sudbury Cubs (NOJHL), 2–6; W, Kam River Fighting Walleye (SIJHL), 3–1; L, Trenton Golden Hawks (OJHL), 2–6; W, Northern Manitoba Blizzard (ManJHL), 6-3	2-0-2-0	4th of 5 Group A	did not qualified	did not qualified	did not qualified

== League awards ==
=== Player awards ===
- 2018 AJHL Rookie of the Year — Zachary Okabe

=== Team awards ===
- 2004 AJHL Champions
- 2009 AJHL Champions

== Notable alumni ==
- Logan Thompson
- Tanner Fritz
- Carter Rowney
- Grant Stevenson
- Nick Weiss

== See also ==
- List of ice hockey teams in Alberta
