= Crowsnest Pass Timberwolves =

- City: Coleman, Alberta
- League: Alberta Junior Hockey League
- Division: South
- Founded: 1998
- Home arena: Coleman Complex
- Colours: Green, white and black

Franchise history
- 1998-2004: Crowsnest Pass Timberwolves
- 2005-Present: Okotoks Oilers

The Crowsnest Pass Timberwolves were a Junior 'A' ice hockey team in the Alberta Junior Hockey League. Based out of the town of Blairmore, Alberta and playing at the Coleman Complex in Coleman, the team represented the Municipality of Crowsnest Pass.

The Timberwolves were founded in 1998 as an expansion team. They lasted only six seasons in the Crowsnest Pass, however, before taking a leave of absence in 2004-05 before relocating to Okotoks to become the Okotoks Oilers. The Timberwolves were the second team to represent the region, as The Pass Red Devils existed from 1972 to 1976.

== Season-by-season record ==
Note: GP = Games played, W = Wins, L = Losses, T/OTL = Ties and overtime losses, SOL = Shootout losses Pts = Points, GF = Goals for, GA = Goals against

Season	GP	W	L	T/OTL	SOL	GF	GA	Pts	Finish	Playoffs
1998-99	62	15	45	-	2	180	329	32	7th AJHL South	
1999-00	64	21	40	-	3	197	305	45	7th AJHL South	
2000-01	64	30	29	5	-	239	280	65	4th AJHL South	
2001-02	64	28	29	7	-	226	258	63	6th AJHL South	
2002-03	64	17	42	5	-	211	327	39	6th AJHL South	
2003-04	60	27	29	4	-	195	231	58	6th AJHL South	

=== Playoffs ===
- 1999 DNQ
- 2000 DNQ
- 2001 Lost quarter-final

Crowsnest Pass Timberwolves defeated Bow Valley Eagles 3-games-to-2
Olds Grizzlys defeated Crowsnest Pass Timberwolves 4-games-to-none

- 2002 Lost preliminary

Camrose Kodiaks defeated Crowsnest Pass Timberwolves 3-games-to-none

- 2003 Lost preliminary

Canmore Eagles defeated Crowsnest Pass Timberwolves 4-games-to-none

- 2004 Lost preliminary

Calgary Canucks defeated Crowsnest Pass Timberwolves 3-games-to-1

== NHL alumni ==
- Jeremy Colliton
- Rick Rypien
- Devin Setoguchi

== See also ==
- List of ice hockey teams in Alberta
