= Lloydminster Centennial Civic Centre =

Coordinates: 53.2876°N 110.0021°W

The Lloydminster Centennial Civic Centre is a 1,700 -seat multi-purpose arena on the Saskatchewan side of the city of Lloydminster, which straddles the border with Alberta. The arena is physically located on 49 Avenue, one block east of the provincial border. It is home to the Lloydminster Bobcats of the Alberta Junior Hockey League (formerly the Lloydminster Blazers), the Lloydminster Border Kings (Saskatchewan Senior AAA), and the Lloydminster Bandits of the North Eastern Alberta Junior B Hockey League. All are ice hockey teams. It is the largest venue with seating in the city and is often used to host circuses, concerts and large-scale gatherings. It is most often used as a skating rink. It was built to commemorate Canada's centennial in 1967. A triple header roller derby game was held on July 11, 2015.

In 2006 the arena was given a major facelift including new seats and an audio system.

== Events and Concerts ==
It also has a smaller upper level often used as a reception area. Somewhat notably this upper level was also the venue for the first "Hubstock", a local indie concert put on by area teens in the mid-1990s, some of whom put out a short lived 'zine called "Hub". Some performers who have played at this venue are Rita MacNeil and Kenny Rogers.
