= Max Bell Centre (Calgary) =

Ice hockey arena in Calgary, Alberta, Canada

Coordinates: 51°02′32″N 114°00′13″W

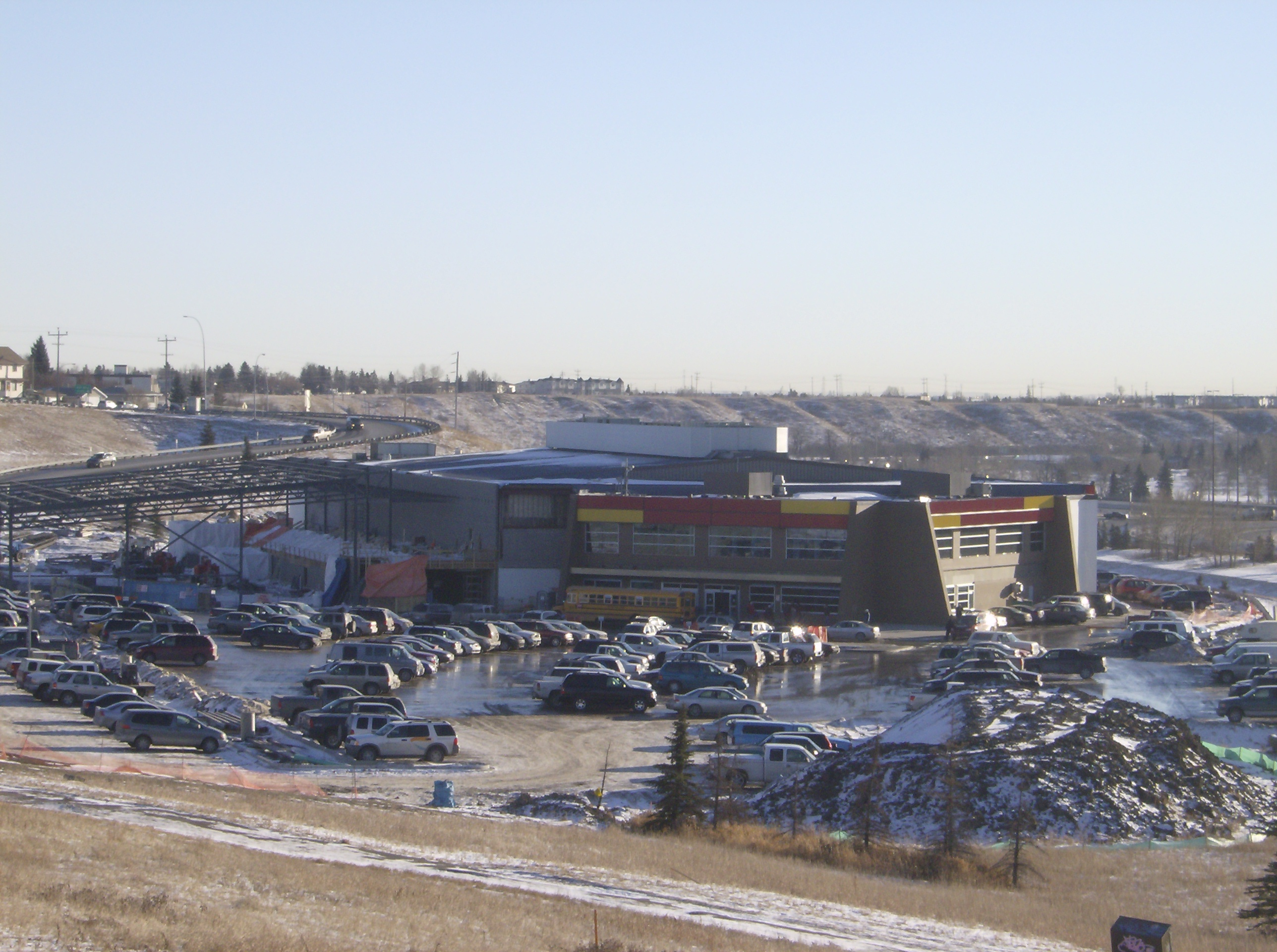
- Interactive map of Max Bell Centre
- Location: 1001 Barlow Trail SE, Calgary, Alberta
- Capacity: Ice hockey: 2,121 sitting, over 3,000 standing

Tenants
- Calgary Canucks (AJHL) (1971–present); Calgary Rad'z (RHI) (1993–1994)

Max Bell Centre (commonly Max Bell Arena) is an ice hockey arena in Calgary, Alberta, Canada, in the community of Albert Park/Radisson Heights. It seats 2,121 for hockey, with a standing room capacity of over 3,000. It is named after Max Bell, a philanthropist who was a prominent businessman in Calgary.

It hosted curling and short-track speed skating events at the 1988 Winter Olympics, both demonstration events. Presently, the arena is home to the Calgary Canucks of the Alberta Junior Hockey League and the primary facility for the Northeast Calgary Athletic Association's minor hockey teams. The arena also hosts Rocky Mountain Lacrosse League games.

Late December, it serves as the primary venue for the Circle K Classic(Formerly known as the Mac’s Midget Tournament)It is home to the Mac's Tourney's "Wall of Fame" featuring every tournament alumnus who has gone on to play in the National Hockey League.

In 2007, the arena completed construction to add a second sheet of ice as the city of Calgary attempts to keep up with demand for ice time in a rapidly growing city. Max Bell Arena 1 in which the Canucks play was renamed the Ken Bracko Arena in 2017 as a tribute to Ken Bracko, the founder of the Circle K Classic (formerly the Mac's Midget Tournament) as well as the 18U Alberta Elite Hockey league (AEHL). Bracko also served as president of the Canucks for 32 years until his death in 2015.

In 2022, the city of Calgary completed $14 million in renovations on the arena.

Since 2016, the grounds surrounding the building host the annual electronic music festival Chasing Summer. The most recent edition took place on August 1-2, 2026. Before 2016, the festival was held at Fort Calgary.
