= R. J. Lalonde Arena =

Multi-purpose arena in Bonnyville, Alberta

Coordinates: 54.2692°N 110.7240°W

The R. J. Lalonde Arena is a 1,800-seat multi-purpose arena in Bonnyville, Alberta, and is among the facilities of the Bonnyville & District Centennial Centre. It is home to the Bonnyville Pontiacs ice hockey team. The arena was opened on November 27, 1982.
