= Lloydminster Bobcats =

Ice hockey team in Saskatchewan, Canada

- City: Lloydminster, Saskatchewan
- League: Alberta Junior Hockey League
- Division: North
- Founded: 1982
- Home arena: Cenovus Energy Hub
- Colours: Black, orange, white
- General manager: Nigel Dube
- Head coach: Eric Labrosse (2025)
- Website: lloydminsterbobcats.ca

Franchise history
- 1982–1988: Lloydminster Lancers (SJHL)
- 1988–2005: Lloydminster Blazers
- 2005–present: Lloydminster Bobcats

The Lloydminster Bobcats are a Canadian junior A ice hockey team in the Alberta Junior Hockey League (AJHL), based in Lloydminster.

== History ==
The Bobcats were preceded by the Lloydminster Blazers, who played from 1988 to 2005, and the Saskatchewan Junior Hockey League's Lloydminster Lancers who competed from 1982 until 1988.

The Bobcats hosted the 2016 Royal Bank Cup, the tournament for the Junior A national championship.

In 2025, the team moved to a new home arena, the Cenovus Energy Hub, a 2,500-seat facility, under a five-year lease agreement. The arena, which opened in 2025, is owned by the City of Lloydminster.

== Season-by-season record ==
Note: GP = Games played, W = Wins, L = Losses, T/OTL = Ties/Overtime losses, SOL = Shootout losses, Pts = Points, GF = Goals for, GA = Goals against

Season	GP	W	L	T/OTL	SOL	GF	GA	Pts	Finish	Playoffs
1982–83	64	16	45	3	—	260	395	35	8th SJHL	Lost Quarterfinals, 0–4 vs. Weyburn Red Wings
1983–84	64	32	31	1	—	315	253	65	5th SJHL	Won Quarterfinals, 4–1 vs. Moose Jaw Canucks; Lost Semifinals, 1–4 vs. Yorkton Terriers
1984–85	64	23	37	4	—	256	296	50	7th SJHL	Lost Quarterfinals, 0–4 vs. Estevan Bruins
1985–86	60	33	26	1	—	318	230	67	3rd SJHL	Lost Quarterfinals, 3–4 vs. Weyburn Red Wings
1986–87	64	42	19	3	—	330	255	87	2nd SJHL	Won Quarterfinals, 4–1 vs. Estevan Bruins; Won Semifinals, 4–0 vs. Battlefords North Stars; Lost Finals, 0–4 vs. Humboldt Broncos
1987–88	60	16	44	0	—	221	355	32	11th SJHL	did not qualify
1988–89	60	18	41	1	—	214	281	37	5th North	Lost Quarterfinals, 2–4 vs. Fort Saskatchewan Traders
1989–90	60	31	29	0	—	294	311	62	3rd North	Won Quarterfinals, 4–3 vs. Fort Saskatchewan Traders; Lost Semifinals, 3–4 vs. Sherwood Park Crusaders
1990–91	56	23	32	1	—	246	293	47	5th overall	Won Quarterfinals, 4–3 vs. Olds Grizzlys; Lost Semifinal, 1–4 vs. Fort Saskatchewan Traders
1991–92	60	27	28	—	5	275	297	59	6th overall	Won Quarterfinals, 4–2 vs. Calgary Royals; Lost Semifinals, 3–4 vs. Fort McMurray Oil Barons
1992–93	56	25	24	—	7	242	255	57	7th overall	Lost Quarterfinal, 0–5 vs. Fort McMurray Oil Barons
1993–94	56	15	37	—	4	202	297	34	8th overall	Lost Quarterfinals, 0–4 vs. Sherwood Park Crusaders
1994–95	56	20	32	—	4	197	267	44	8th overall	Lost Quarterfinals, 1–4 vs. Olds Grizzlys
1995–96	60	10	48	—	2	161	365	22	10th overall	did not qualify
1996–97	60	27	33	—	0	201	263	54	10th overall	did not qualify
1997–98	60	30	26	—	4	224	190	64	6th overall	Lost Quarterfinals, 0–4 vs. Fort Saskatchewan Traders
1998–99	62	37	23	—	2	257	213	76	2nd North	Won Div. Semifinals, 4–3 vs. Fort Saskatchewan Traders; Lost Div. Finals, 3–4 vs. St. Albert Saints
1999–00	64	42	18	—	4	268	203	88	2nd North	Won Div. Semifinals, 4–0 vs. Fort Saskatchewan Traders; Lost Div. Finals, 1–4 vs. Fort McMurray Oil Barons
2000–01	64	36	23	5	—	251	233	77	5th North	Lost Div. Quarterfinals, 1–3 vs. Fort McMurray Oil Barons
2001–02	64	26	33	5	—	218	268	57	6th North	Lost Div. Quarterfinals, 0–3 vs. Sherwood Park Crusaders
2002–03	64	31	27	6	—	232	260	68	5th North	Lost Div. Quarterfinals, 1–4 vs. St. Albert Saints
2003–04	60	24	34	2	—	176	222	50	7th North	Won Div. Quarterfinals, 3–1 vs. St. Albert Saints; Lost Div. Semifinal, 1–4 vs. Grande Prairie Storm
2004–05	64	17	40	7	—	156	246	41	7th North	Lost Div. Quarterfinals, 0–3 vs. Spruce Grove Saints
2005–06	60	17	37	6	—	146	248	40	7th North	Lost Div. Quarterfinals, 0–3 vs. Drayton Valley Thunder
2006–07	60	21	26	3	—	186	264	45	8th North	did not qualify
2007–08	62	28	29	5	—	189	208	61	6th North	Lost Div. Quarterfinals, 0–3 vs. Spruce Grove Saints
2008–09	62	25	29	8	—	203	219	58	7th North	Lost Div. Quarterfinals, 1–3 vs. Grande Prairie Storm
2009–10	60	19	32	9	—	173	220	47	7th North	Lost Div. Quarterfinals, 1–3 vs. Grande Prairie Storm
2010–11	60	32	24	4	—	157	162	68	5th North	Won Div. Quarterfinals, 3–2 vs. Grande Prairie Storm; Lost Div. Semifinals, 0–4 vs. Spruce Grove Saints
2011–12	60	38	14	8	—	198	149	84	3rd North	Lost Div. Quarterfinals, 0–3 vs. Drayton Valley Thunder
2012–13	60	20	33	7	—	166	225	47	8th North	did not qualify
2013–14	60	31	23	6	—	180	176	68	3rd North	Won Div. Quarterfinals, 3–2 vs. Whitecourt Wolverines; Lost Div. Semifinals, 3–4 vs. Fort McMurray Oil Barons
2014–15	60	32	20	8	—	186	155	72	2nd North	Won Div. Quarterfinals, 3–1 vs. Whitecourt Wolverines; Lost Div. Semifinals, 2–4 vs. Bonnyville Pontiacs
2015–16	60	44	14	2	—	236	155	90	3rd North	Won Div. Quarterfinals, 3–0 vs. Drayton Valley Thunder; Won Div. Semifinals, 4–0 vs. Whitecourt Wolverines; Lost Div. Finals, 1–4 vs. Spruce Grove Saints
2016–17	60	15	44	3	2	124	223	33	8th of 8, North; 15th of 16, AJHL	did not qualify
2017–18	60	23	34	3	2	143	206	49	6th of 8, North; 14th of 16, AJHL	Lost Div. Quarterfinals, 0–3 vs. Whitecourt Wolverines
2018–19	60	9	49	2	—	123	276	20	8th of 8, North; 15th of 16, AJHL	did not qualify
2019–20	58	11	41	6	—	120	238	28	8th of 8, North; 13th of 15, AJHL	did not qualify
2020–21	2	0	2	0	—	4	8	0	Season cancelled due to covid-19 pandemic	
2021–22	60	30	26	4	—	192	219	64	5th of 8, North; 8th of 16, AJHL	Lost Div. Quarterfinals, 1-4 vs. Drayton Valley Thunder
2022–23	60	23	34	1	2	191	239	49	6th of 8, North; 12th of 16, AJHL	Lost Div. Quarterfinals, 2-4 vs. Bonnyville Pontiacs
2023–24	57	33	24	-	-	211	199	66	2nd of 11, AJHL	Lost Div. Quarterfinals, 2-4 vs. Canmore Eagles
2024–25	54	31	19	1	3	192	155	66	3rd of 6 North; 9th of 12, AJHL	Lost Div. Quarterfinals, 0-4 vs. Grande Prairie Storm
2025–26	54	34	14	4	3	188	151	75	3rd of 6 North; 3rd of 12, AJHL	Lost Div. Quarterfinals, 0-4 vs. Grande Prairie Storm

=== Junior A National Championship ===
The National Junior A Championship, known as the Centennial Cup and formerly as the Royal Bank Cup or RBC Cup, is the postseason tournament for the Canadian national championship for Junior A hockey teams that are members of the Canadian Junior Hockey League.

The tournament features regional Junior A champions together with a previously selected host team. Since 1990, it has used a five-team tournament format when the regional qualifiers were designated as the ANAVET Cup (Western), Doyle Cup (Pacific), Dudley Hewitt Cup (Central), and Fred Page Cup (Eastern). From 2013 to 2017, the qualifiers were the Dudley Hewitt Cup (Central), Fred Page Cup (Eastern), and the Western Canada Cup champions and runners-up (Western #1 and #2).

The tournament begins with round-robin play between the five teams followed by the top four teams playing a semifinal game, with the top seed facing the fourth seed and the second facing the third. The winners of the semifinals then face each other in final game for the national championship. In some years, the losers of the semifinal games face each other for a third place game.

Year	Round-robin	Record	Standing	Semifinal	Third place game	Championship game
2016; Host	L, 2–5 vs. West Kelowna Warriors (Western #1); OTW, 4–3 vs. Carleton Place Canadians (Eastern); L, 3–4 vs. Brooks Bandits (Western #2); L, 1–4 vs. Trenton Golden Hawks (Central)	0–1–0–3 (W–OTW–OTL–L)	4th of 5	W, 6–2 vs. Trenton Golden Hawks	Not played	L, 0–4 vs. West Kelowna Warriors

== Notable alumni ==
The following former Blazers or Bobcats have gone on to play in professional hockey leagues:

- Scott Bailey
- David Dziurzynski
- Scott Hartnell
- Wade Redden
- Mike Siklenka
- Emerance Maschmeyer
- Braden Holtby

== See also ==
- List of ice hockey teams in Alberta
- List of ice hockey teams in Saskatchewan
- Lloydminster Border Kings
