= Ice hockey in Calgary =

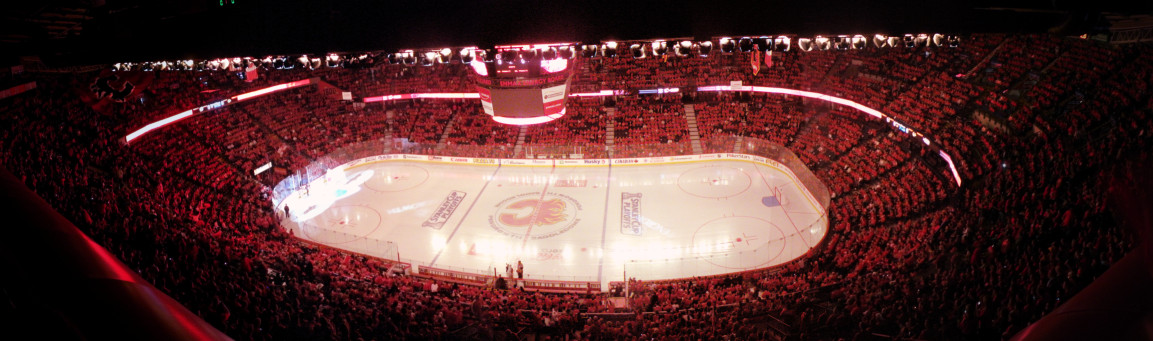
The "C of Red"

The history of ice hockey in Calgary extends back well over a century to the first recorded ice hockey game in Alberta in 1893. Imported from eastern Canada, the game's popularity rapidly grew in the city, with teams at every level playing for and capturing Canada's national championships. Calgary is known today as one of Canada's best ice hockey cities with the Calgary Flames (NHL), Calgary Wranglers (AHL) and Calgary Hitmen (WHL) receiving immense support from the city. The Calgary Oval X-Treme is one of the most dominant women's ice hockey teams in the country, while Junior A ice hockey is also well supported with two teams in the city. Calgary is home to the Mac's AAA midget hockey tournament, one of the most prestigious midget hockey tournaments in the world which has seen dozens of future National Hockey League players play in this city before their professional careers began.

== History ==
=== Early days ===
The first recorded ice hockey game in Alberta took place in Calgary on January 4, 1893, between two city teams: the Town Boys and the Tailors. The game was played with seven players aside and the Town Boys won 4-1. Shortly after, the Town Boys met a challenge from a team of North-West Mounted Police officers, losing 4-0 before avenging the defeat in a rematch.

In 1898, the first "Battle of Alberta" took place in Edmonton, as the Edmonton Thistles faced a team made up of members of the Calgary fire brigade. The match turned violent and a brawl saw Calgary's E.D. Marshall lose an eye in a stick swinging incident.

=== Calgary Tigers ===
Major professional ice hockey arrived in the prairies in 1921 with the formation of the Western Canada Hockey League. The Calgary Tigers brought five future Hockey Hall of Fame players to the city in Barney Stanley, Red Dutton, Rusty Crawford, Herb Gardiner and Harry Oliver. During the Tigers' six-year run, they captured three regular season titles and two playoff championships. In 1924, the Tigers challenged the National Hockey League's Montreal Canadiens for the Stanley Cup. The Tigers lost, however, in two straight games with scores of 6-1 and 3-0, Howie Morenz scoring a hat-trick in the first game and another goal in the second for the Canadiens. It was nearly 60 years before Calgary again challenged for ice hockey's holy grail. The Tigers ceased operations in 1927, succumbing to the costs of maintaining an all-star lineup. Following the demise of the Tigers, no major professional club would emerge in Calgary until the 1975 arrival of the World Hockey Association.

=== Calgary Stampeders ===
In the year following World War II, the Calgary Stampeders brought home Calgary's first, and only, Allan Cup national senior championship with a four games to one series victory over the Hamilton Tigers. The 1945–46 Stampeders were a powerhouse club, compiling a record of 42-9-5, culminating in a 1-0 victory in the fifth and deciding game against Hamilton, played before a sold-out crowd of over 6,000 at the Edmonton Gardens in Edmonton. The Stampeders won three Western Canada Senior Hockey League titles in the league's six-year run.

After having a new arena built in 1950, the Stampeders turned professional in 1951, spending the next twelve years in the Western Hockey League, which was at the time the top professional circuit in the west. The Stampeders won the 1954 WHL championship in Calgary. The team folded in 1963 after succumbing to the financial pressures of operating in such a widespread league.

== Junior ice hockey ==
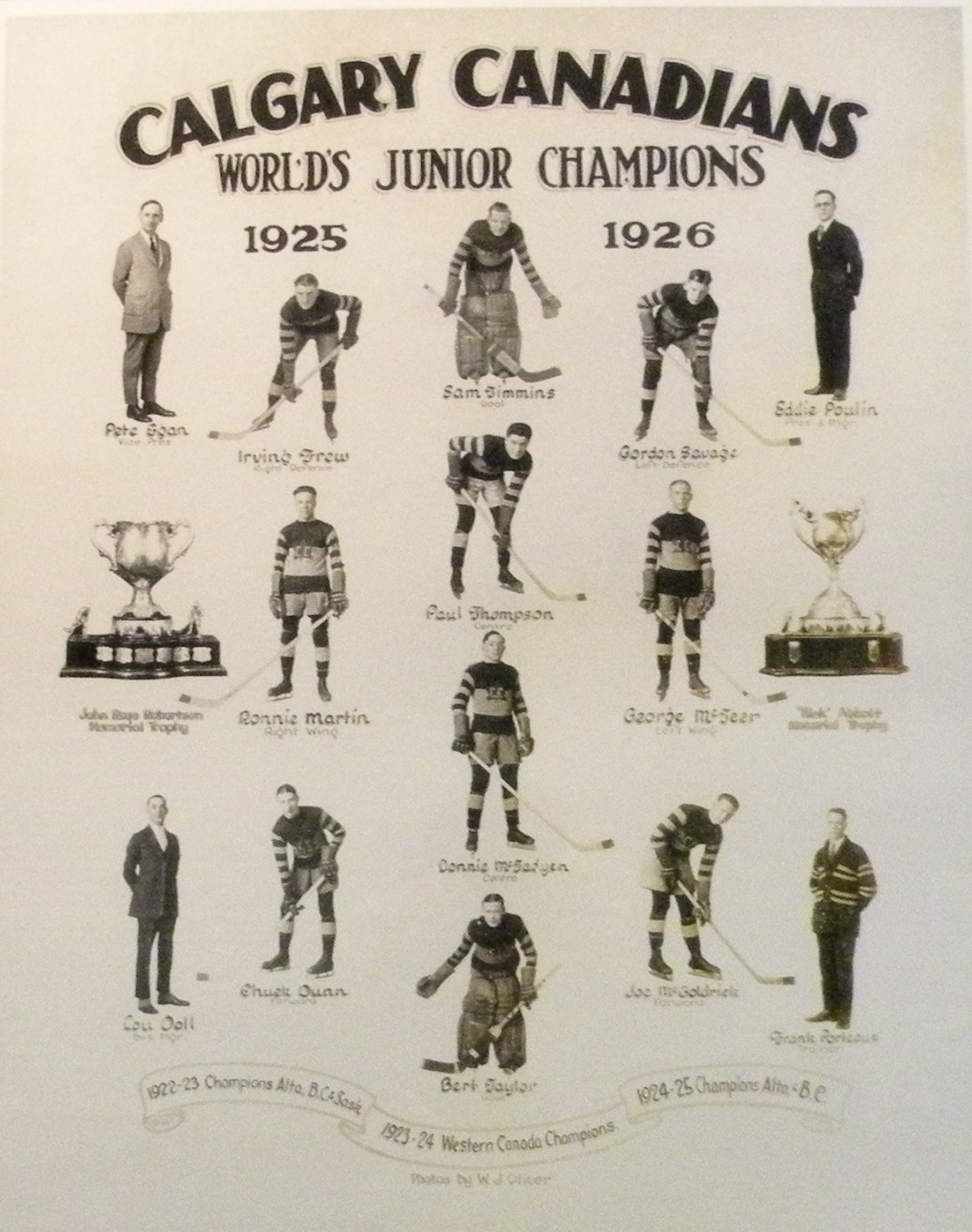
The 1925–26 Calgary Canadians were Alberta's first Memorial Cup champion.

=== Alberta Junior Hockey League ===
Junior ice hockey in Alberta began to take shape in 1963 when the Alberta Junior Hockey League was formed, partially to check the dominance of the Edmonton Oil Kings at the time. The five team loop featured two teams from Calgary - the Calgary Cowboys and Calgary Buffaloes. The Buffaloes were the early powerhouse of the league, winning the AJHL's first two championships in 1964 and 1965. The two teams struggled against the Western Canada Hockey League, however, and in 1965, the Cowboys merged with the Buffaloes before folding altogether in 1969.

The AJHL returned to Calgary in 1971 when the Calgary Canucks was formed. The Canucks was the brainchild of Doug Eastcott, and was created as an outlet to give Calgary area youngsters a place to play without sacrificing their education. Acting as an extension of the Calgary minor hockey association, the Canucks restricted themselves to only three out-of-town players for many years. The Canucks have become one of the most dominant clubs in the AJHL, having won nine AJHL championships, two Doyle Cups and the Centennial Cup in 1995 as Canadian Tier II national champions. Nearly 50 former Canucks have gone on to play in the NHL, including Heatley, Mike Vernon, Jason Smith, Doug Houda and Craig Adams.

In 1978, a second team in Calgary was added as the Calgary Chinooks relocated from Pincher Creek. The team became the Spurs two years later, but never found the same success as the Canucks. In 1990, the Spurs ceased operations; however their assets were purchased by a new ownership group that rebranded the club the Calgary Royals. The Royals captured their single AJHL title in their inaugural season, but have failed to repeat that success.

=== Western Hockey League ===
Three years after the arrival of the AJHL, another league, the Western Canada Junior Hockey League was formed. It was considered a "rebel league" by the Canadian Hockey Association, and thus not permitted to play for the Memorial Cup. The seven team loop featured five teams that defected from the Saskatchewan Junior Hockey League along with the Edmonton Oil Kings, and an expansion team for Calgary, the Calgary Buffaloes. The Buffaloes were dismal in the league's inaugural season in 1966–67 season, finishing just 4-47-5. The franchise renamed itself the Calgary Centennials the following year, and had moderate success in the mid-1970s, winning three division titles and reaching the league finals once. It relocated to Billings, Montana in 1977 to become the Billings Bighorns. That franchise continues today as the Tri-City Americans. Future NHLers John Davidson, Bob Nystrom and Mike Rogers played for the Centennials.

The Centennials were immediately replaced by the Calgary Wranglers, who relocated from Winnipeg, Manitoba. Like the Centennials, the Wranglers never became a top team in the league, though they did reach the finals in 1980–81. Declining interest in the team because of the popularity of the Calgary Flames led to the Wranglers moving south to Lethbridge, Alberta in 1987 to become the Lethbridge Hurricanes. Doug Houda, Kelly Kisio, Dana Murzyn and former Flames head coach Jim Playfair are among the former Wranglers who made the NHL.

The controversial original logo of the Hitmen, and the alternate they were forced to use in their first season.

Despite a long-standing belief that major-junior ice hockey could not compete with the professionals, the WHL again placed a team in Calgary in 1995. The Calgary Hitmen were owned by, among others, Theoren Fleury, Joe Sakic and Bret Hart, after whom the team was named. The Hitmen created an immediate controversy with their logo, featuring a stylized "Jason Voorhees" type mask and distinctive pink and grey jersey colours. Despite its immense popularity, the WHL initially forbade the Hitmen from using the logo, deeming the look too violent, but relented a year later. The Hitmen currently use an updated version of the original logo.

The Hitmen were abysmal in their first two seasons, winning just 33 games combined. The team also faced further controversy when head coach Graham James resigned after being charged with, and later convicted of, sexually abusing two of his players when he was with the Swift Current Broncos. In 1997, the Hitmen were purchased by the Calgary Flames. The team's fortunes improved immediately, as the Hitmen won their division in 1997–98, and the following season, the Hitmen captured the league championship in just their fourth season. The Hitmen advanced all the way to the 1999 Memorial Cup title game before losing in overtime to the host Ottawa 67's 7-6 in a thrilling final.

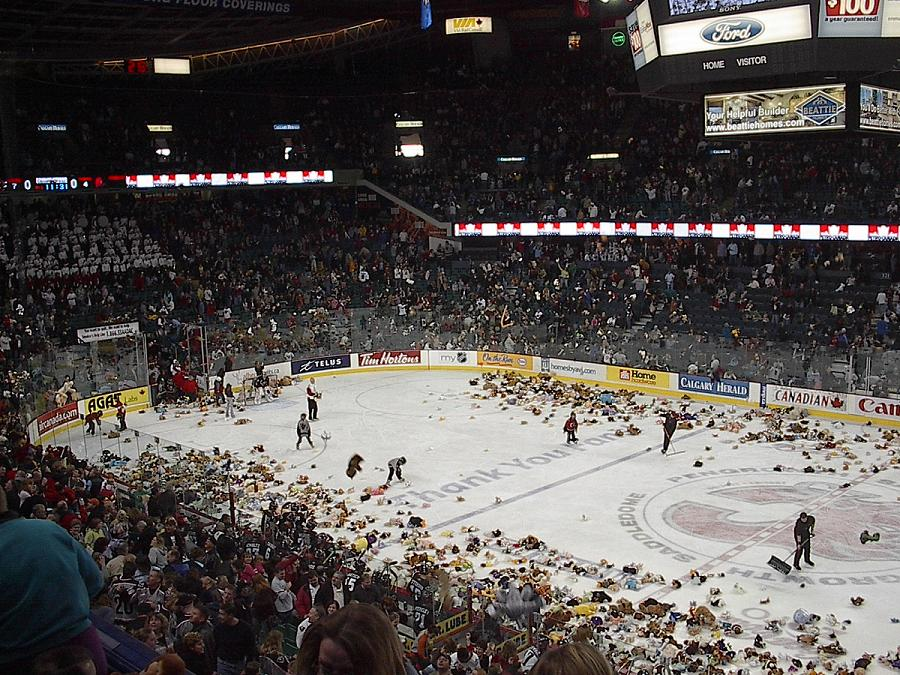
The "world's largest teddy bear toss"

The Hitmen have not managed to duplicate that success, but in recent years have showcased many good, young players who have helped Canada dominate the World Junior Hockey Championship. Andrew Ladd and Ryan Getzlaf were members of the dominating club that won gold in the 2005 tournament in Grand Forks, North Dakota, while goaltender Justin Pogge led Canada to a surprise defense of their championship in the 2006 tournament in Vancouver. Ladd also became the first Hitmen graduate to win the Stanley Cup, which he did with the Carolina Hurricanes in 2006.

The Hitmen have also become one of the most popular junior teams in Canada, leading the WHL in attendance four consecutive years, including a Canadian Hockey League then-record average of 10,062 in 2004–05, the first junior team to ever average over 10,000 fans per game.

== World Hockey Association ==
In 1971, a fledgling operation known as the World Hockey Association announced its intention to compete against the NHL as North America's second major league. Among the original franchises announced for the league was the Calgary Broncos, who were to play out of the Stampede Corral and were expected to form a strong rivalry with the Edmonton Oilers. Although the Broncos participated in the first WHA draft, the franchise never played, folding prior to the WHA's inaugural season. Following the demise of the Broncos, the Oilers were renamed the Alberta Oilers, with the intention of splitting their home games between Calgary and Edmonton. Likewise, this plan failed to materialize and 'Alberta' was quickly dropped from the Oilers' name.

In 1975, the WHA finally did arrive in Calgary, as the Vancouver Blazers relocated to the Stampede City to become the Calgary Cowboys. The Cowboys finished the 1975–76 season with a respectable 41-35-4 record, upsetting the Quebec Nordiques in the playoffs before losing to the eventual Avco Cup champion Winnipeg Jets.

The Cowboys second season was the franchise's last, as dismal attendance and a team that missed the playoffs led to the franchise folding following the season. The entire league itself would follow two years later, with four teams merging into the NHL.

== Calgary Flames ==
In 1980, the National Hockey League finally arrived in Calgary when Nelson Skalbania, a Vancouver-based businessman, got wind of the pending sale of the Atlanta Flames to a group of Calgary-area businessmen. Skalbania intercepted the sale by offering team owner Tom Cousins a 25% increase over his previous asking price of US$12 million and providing an immediate $1 million down payment for the team. The purchase price of US$16 million was the highest ever paid for an NHL team at the time. Relocating the team to Calgary, Skalbania's interest was soon bought out by the "original six" Calgary businessmen (Ralph T. Scurfield, Daryl Seaman, Byron Seaman, Harley Hotchkiss, Norman Green, and Norman Kwong) thus ensuring the future stability of the franchise in Calgary.

The Flames first season in the raucous Stampede Corral was a major success, as the team defeated both the Chicago Black Hawks and Philadelphia Flyers in the playoffs before being defeated themselves by the Minnesota North Stars in the league semi-finals.

In 1981, the Flames traded for Lanny McDonald, then of the Colorado Rockies. McDonald's trademark moustache and his enthusiasm for the game defined the Flames throughout the 1980s. In 1982–83, McDonald battled young superstar Wayne Gretzky for the league goal scoring title for the entire season. McDonald's tally of 66 goals - still a franchise record - fell just five markers short of Gretzky's total of 71.

=== Glory years ===
1986 saw the Flames run to the Stanley Cup finals, capturing the organization's first Campbell Bowl before bowing out to the Montreal Canadiens in five games in the finals. The 1985–86 season is best known for the Flames shocking seven game upset of the powerhouse Oilers in the Smythe Division finals. The series winning goal was scored by Oilers' rookie defenseman Steve Smith - on his birthday - after he banked the puck into his own net off the skate of goaltender Grant Fuhr. The upset ended the Oilers' hopes of winning a third consecutive Stanley Cup. A decade later, Smith came to play for the Flames, eventually becoming team captain.

In 1989, the Flames captured their first, and only, Stanley Cup, avenging their loss in 1986 by defeating the Canadiens in six games. Despite dominating the league in 1988–89, winning the Presidents' Trophy as regular season champions, Calgary had to survive a major scare at the hands of the Vancouver Canucks, who despite finishing 43 points behind the Flames, took Calgary to overtime in the seventh game in the Smythe Division semifinals. Calgary then went on to defeat the Kings, Blackhawks and the aforementioned Canadiens to capture Lord Stanley's Mug. McDonald, who scored his 500th goal and 1000th point during the season, retired following the season.

=== "Decline" ===
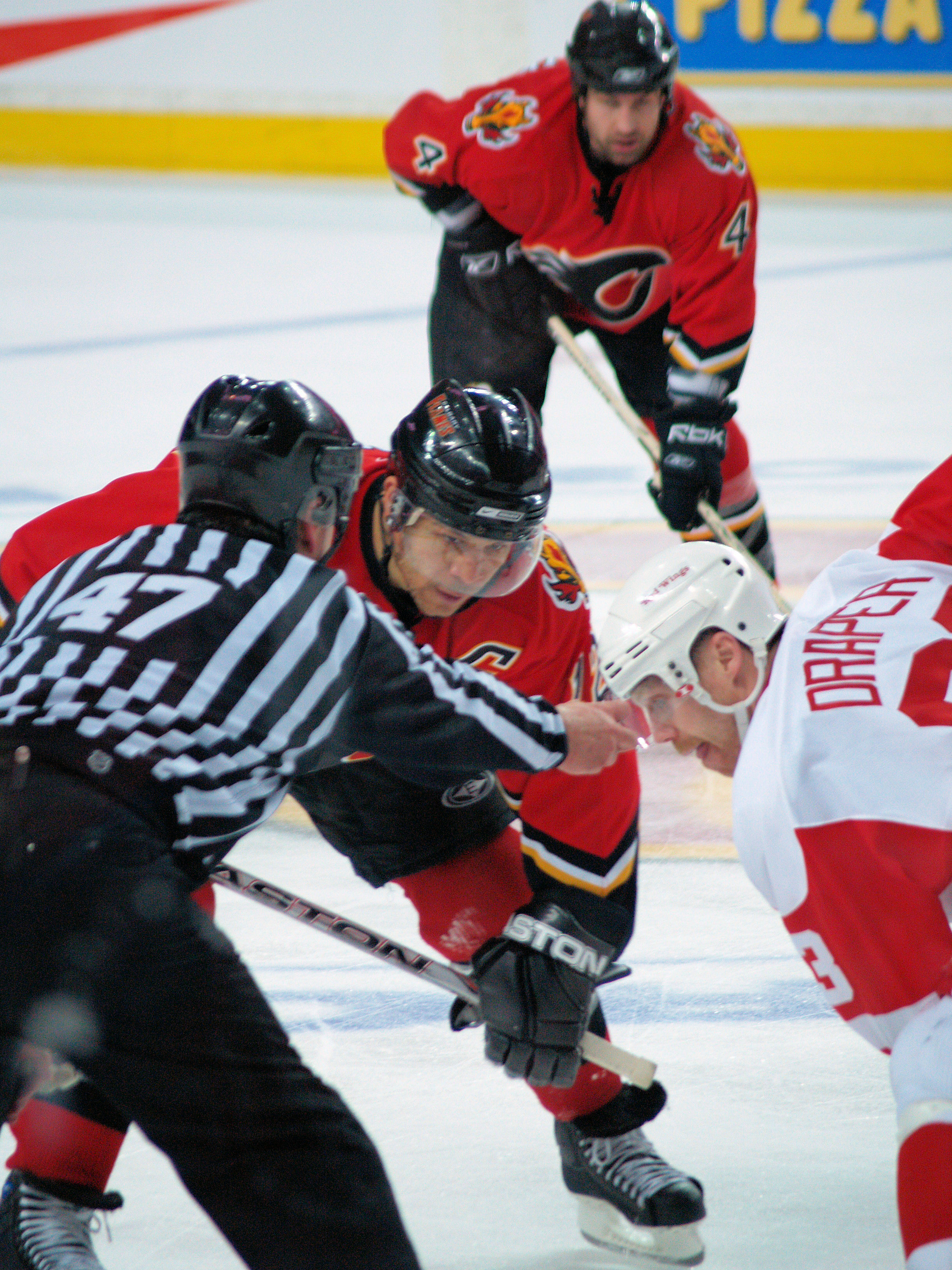
Jarome Iginla and Kris Draper of the Detroit Red Wings taking a faceoff in the 2006 playoffs

After winning the Cup, the Flames faced a long decline through the 1990s and into the 21st century. Declining fortunes on the ice, escalating salaries, a low Canadian Dollar and management blunders saw the Flames fail to win a single playoff series following their Cup win until 2004, while the team missed the playoffs seven straight years between 1997 and 2003. On January 2, 1992, GM Doug Risebrough completed what is often regarded as one of the most lopsided trades in NHL history. Embroiled in a contract dispute with Doug Gilmour, Risebrough traded the disgruntled star to the Toronto Maple Leafs along with Rick Wamsley, Ric Nattress, Jamie Macoun and Kent Manderville for Gary Leeman, Michel Petit, Jeff Reese, Craig Berube and Alexander Godynyuk. The deal - one of the largest in NHL history - catapulted the formerly inept Maple Leafs into years of being a contender, while hastening the decline of the Flames. Not a single player acquired by the Flames was still with the organization two years later.

=== Resurgence ===
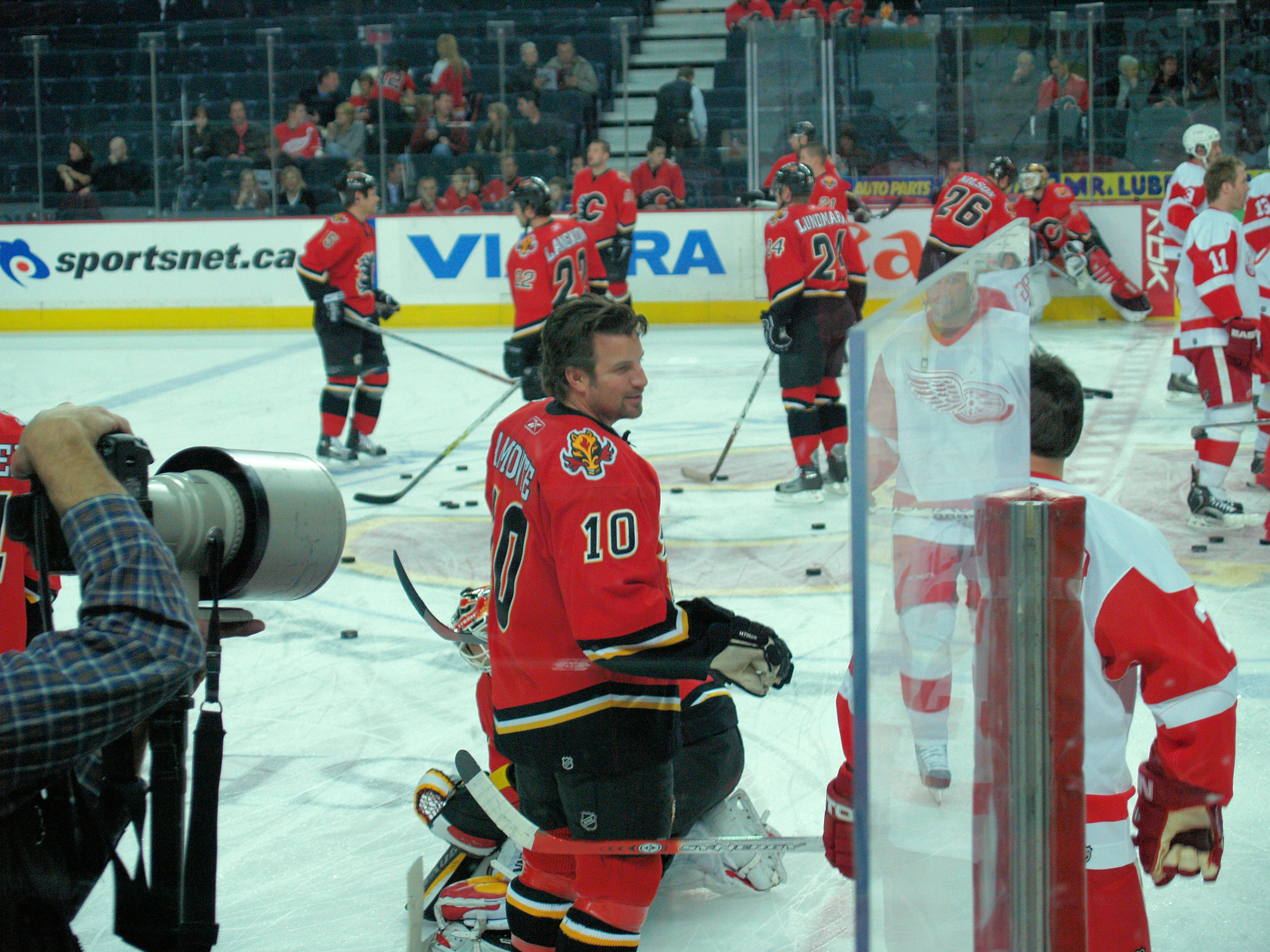
Warmup before a Calgary Flames game

The Flames finally emerged from their post-season drought in 2003–04. Led by coach/GM Darryl Sutter, superstar forward Jarome Iginla and the emerging goaltending star Miikka Kiprusoff, the Flames shocked the ice hockey world by becoming the first team to defeat three division winners en route to the Stanley Cup Finals. The defeats of the Vancouver Canucks, Detroit Red Wings and San Jose Sharks turned the Cinderella Flames into national heroes, while the parties on the Red Mile became international news. The Flames fell in the finals to the Tampa Bay Lightning in a hard-fought seven game series; however, the result was not without controversy due to a Martin Gelinas goal late in the third period of game 6. The puck was seen in replay to cross the goal line before being kicked back out by Lightning goaltender Nikolai Khabibulin. The play, which if reviewed may have broken the tie in Calgary's favour, in a game Tampa would later win in overtime to fend off elimination, was not immediately reviewed.

The Flames followed up that season by winning their sixth division championship in 2005–06, but were beaten in the first round of the playoffs by the Mighty Ducks of Anaheim.

== Teams ==
=== Current teams ===
Team	League	Founded	Championships	Notes
Calgary Flames	NHL	1980	1	Founded in 1972 as the Atlanta Flames
Calgary Wranglers	AHL	2022	0	Founded in 1977 as the Maine Mariners
Calgary Hitmen	WHL	1995	2	
Calgary Canucks	AJHL	1972	9	Won Centennial Cup national championship in 1995
Calgary Dinos	CIS	????	0	
Mount Royal Cougars	CIS	????	11	11 Championships were won when they were still a part of the ACAC, which ended in 2011
SAIT Trojans	ACAC	????	7	

=== Defunct or relocated teams ===
Team	League	Existed	Championships	Notes
Calgary Tigers	WCHL	1921–27	2	
Calgary Stampeders	Various senior leagues	1938–51	?	Won the 1946 Allan Cup
Calgary Stampeders	WPHL	1951–63	1	
Calgary Broncos	WHA	1971	0	Folded before first game
Calgary Cowboys	WHA	1975–77	0	
Calgary Centennials	WCHL	1966–77	0	Known as the Buffaloes in 1966-67
Calgary Wranglers	WHL	1977–87	0	
Calgary Cowboys (AJHL)	AJHL	1963–70	2?	Known as the Buffaloes from 1963–66
Calgary Spurs	AJHL	1978–90	0	Known as the Chinooks from 1978–79
Calgary Oval X-Treme	WWHL	1995–2009	6	
Calgary Mustangs	AJHL	1990–2019	1	

== See also ==
- Alberta Midget Hockey League
- Calgary Cup
- Calgary Junior Hockey League
- List of ice hockey teams in Alberta
- Mac's AAA midget hockey tournament
- Sport in Calgary
