= Lucie Povová =

Czech ice hockey player (born 1992)

- Born: September 16, 1992 (age 34) Roudnice nad Labem, Czechoslovakia
- Height: 5 ft 8 in (173 cm)
- Weight: 137 lb (62 kg; 9 st 11 lb)
- Position: Forward
- Shoots: Left
- ČSLH team Former teams: HC Litoměřice; Northeastern Huskies; HC Slavia Praha
- National team: Czech Republic
- Playing career: 2002–present

Lucie Povová (born September 16, 1992) is a Czech ice hockey player who won a gold medal with the Czech Republic at the 2011 IIHF Division II Worlds. She was part of the Czech team that competed at the 2013 IIHF Women's World Championship in Ottawa.

== Playing career ==
Povová participated in ice hockey for four years at Wyoming Seminary in Pennsylvania. In addition, she was a goaltender on the Wyoming Seminary soccer team for four years, including two as captain. She is also part of her Czech National Team since the age of 15.

=== Czech Republic ===
On January 8, 2008, Povová scored in an 11-2 loss to Canada at the 2008 IIHF World Women's U18 Championship. Povová was member of the Czech women's national team that won the gold medal at the 2011 IIHF Division II World Championships in Caen, France. She was fourth in scoring with two goals and three assists. Two of her teammates on the Czech Republic gold medal winning team also attended Wyoming Seminary in Pennsylvania. Alena Polenska and Nikola Tomigova, were both former graduates of the school. All three Wyoming Seminary graduates played on the same line, and were called the American line.

Povová competed with the Czech Republic at the 2013 IIHF Women's World Championship. It had marked the first time that the Czech Republic competed at the Women's Worlds.

=== NCAA ===
Povová played NCAA hockey with the Northeastern Huskies women's ice hockey, scoring 7 goals and 12 assists in 33 games during her first season in 2011–12. She amassed 98 matches over four seasons, finishing in 2015.

== Awards and honors ==
- 2010 IIHF Under 18 Women's Worlds Player of the Game (Czech Republic vs. USA)

== Career stats ==
=== Czech Republic ===
Year	Event	GP	G	A	Pts	Pim
2008	IIHF Under 18 WWC	5	2	1	3	10

== Awards and honors ==
- Hockey East Co-Rookie of the Week (Week of October 24, 2011)
- 2013 Ball Hockey World Championship All-Star Team

== Personal ==
In the summer, Povová teaches hockey at the Czech International Hockey School.
