= Sport in Calgary =

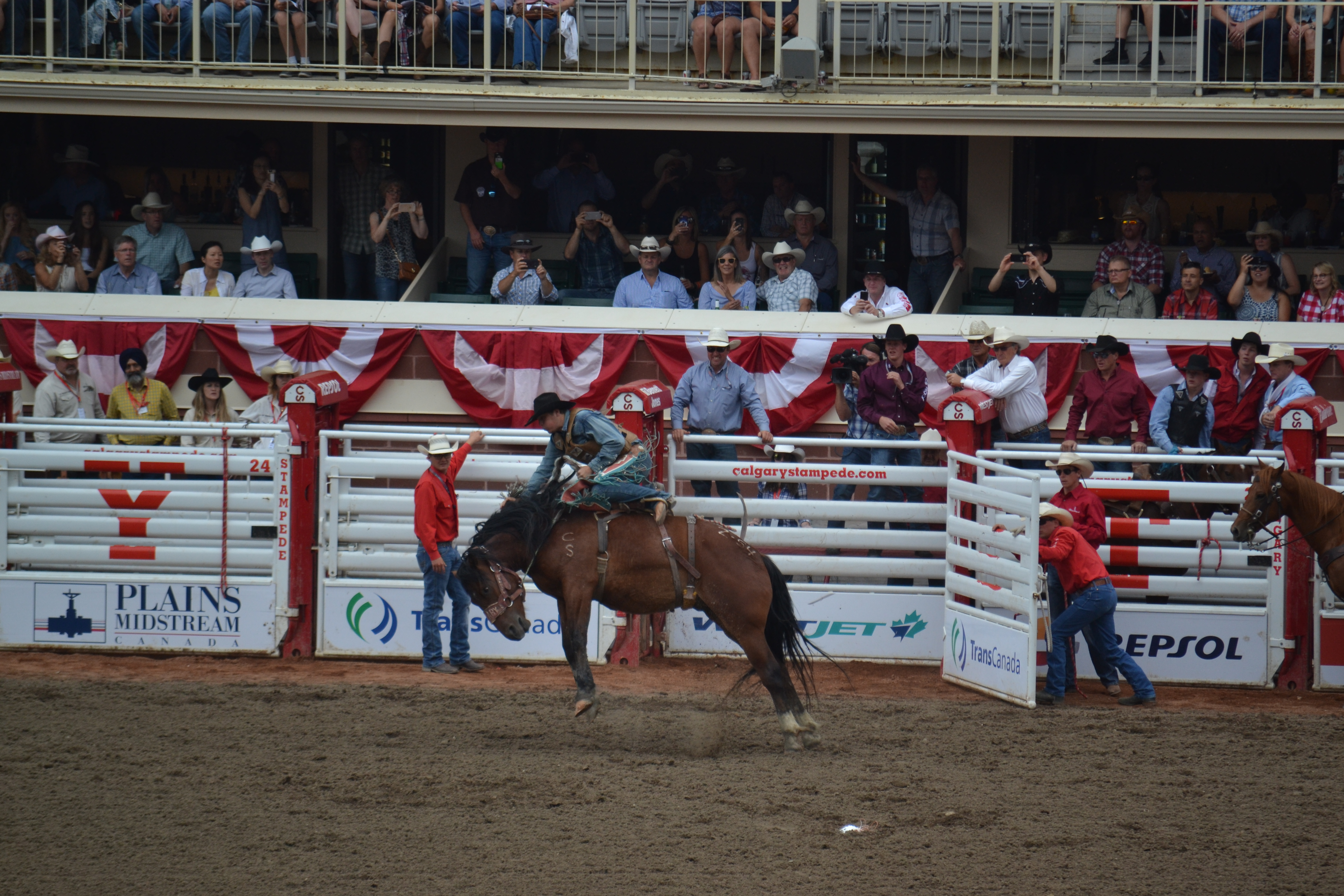
A rider competing in an event at the Calgary Stampede

Calgary, Alberta, Canada, is home to a deep-seated tradition of winter sports. Much of this stems from its location, with proximity to the Alberta Rocky Mountains and Banff National Park. After hosting the 1988 Winter Olympics, the city has also had winter sports and training facilities. Beyond winter sports, Calgary has several professional and amateur sports teams and is a major world pro rodeo center, with the city's Stampede Park holding the annual Calgary Stampede.

Calgary boasts a variety of sports leagues in the summer and winter seasons. Australian football, basketball, cricket, field hockey, futsal, ice hockey, lacrosse, netball, soccer, sailing, volleyball, and ringette are all available in various locations throughout Calgary.

== Sports facilities ==
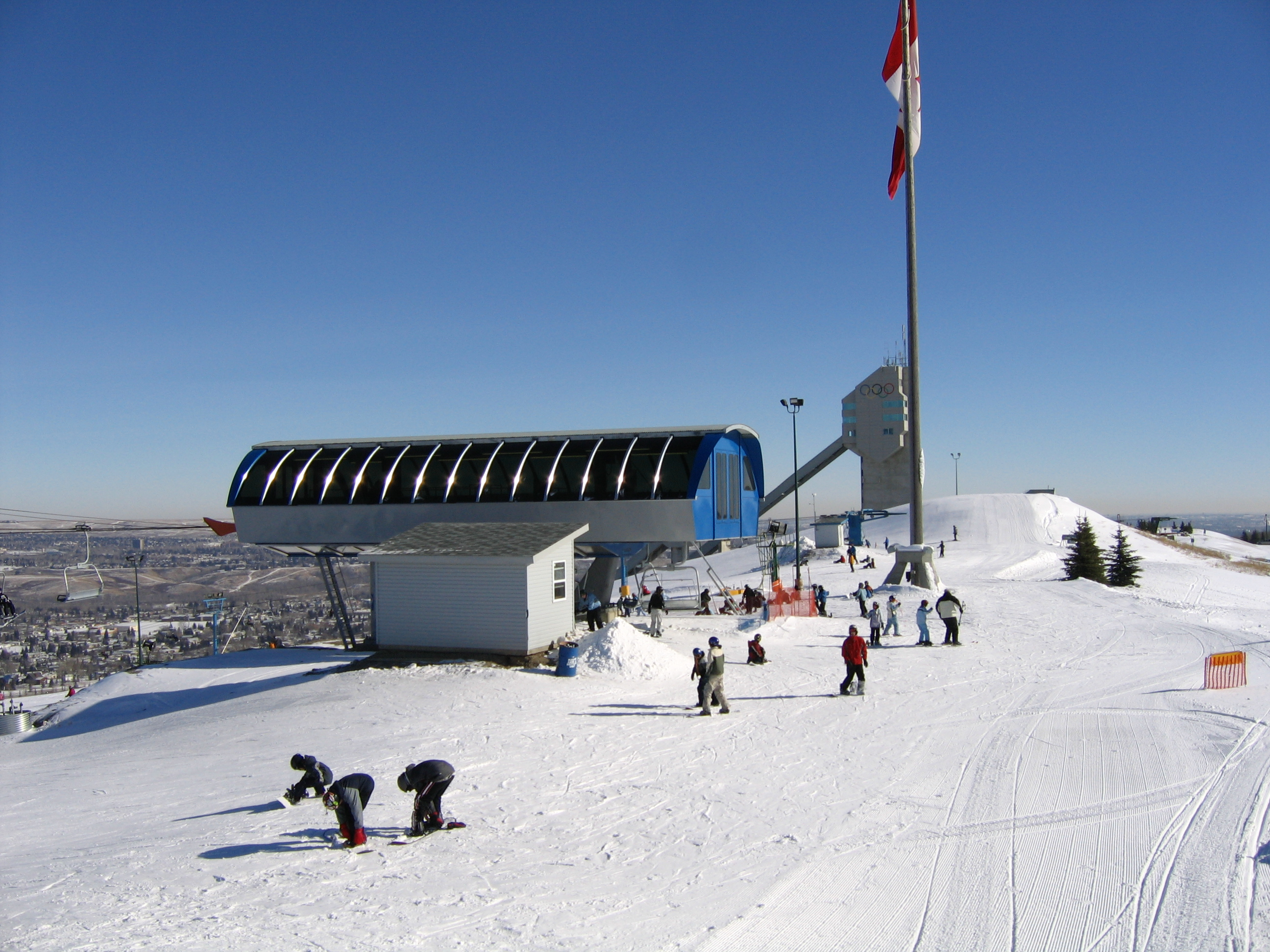
Ski Jump and chairlift at Canada Olympic Park Summit in Calgary

Calgary hosted the 1988 Winter Olympic Games, and many of the Olympic facilities continue to function as major high-performance training facilities. Among the most notable of these are WinSport's Canada Olympic Park and the Olympic Oval.

Athletes also take advantage of the high altitude to improve their physical limits. With facilities that are considered to be world-class and proximity to the Canadian Rockies, Calgary attracts athletes from all over Canada and around the world for winter sports training.

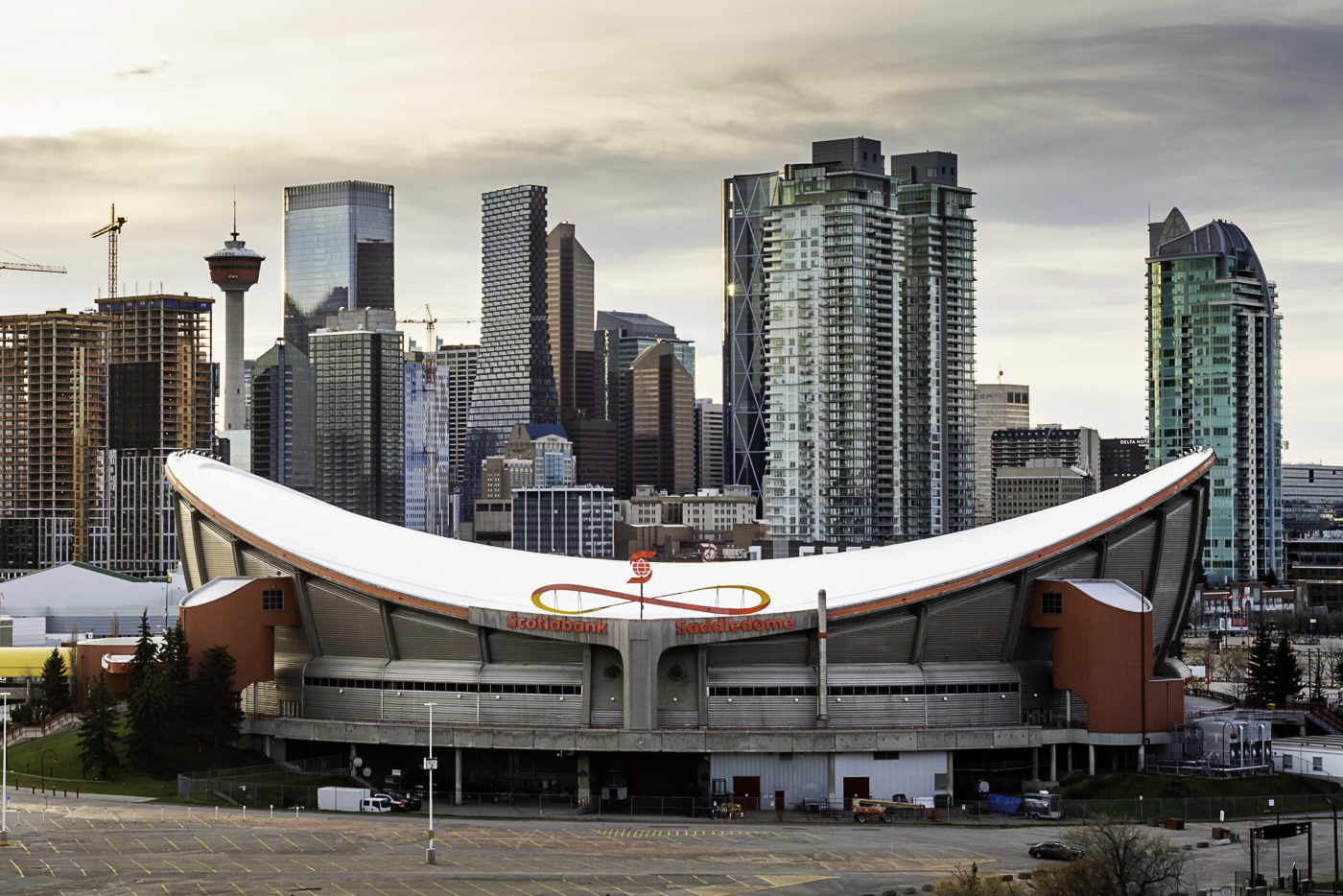
The Scotiabank Saddledome is a multipurpose indoor arena located within Stampede Park

Calgary's multipurpose arena, the Scotiabank Saddledome was formerly known as the Olympic Saddledome. The Saddledome was the first modern arena in North America capable of accommodating an Olympic regulation-sized ice rink. Calgary's primary open-air stadium, McMahon Stadium, was the site of the opening and closing ceremonies of the Olympics and is currently the venue for Calgary's Canadian Football League team, the Calgary Stampeders. The stadium has a capacity of 35,400 and is the fifth largest in Canada.

The Olympic Oval is primarily a speed-skating arena that can also accommodate hockey and high-performance training. The rink's ice is world-renowned, and it brings some of the best speed skaters in the world to the facility for training and competition. The Oval has often been touted as having "the fastest ice on Earth" due to the fact that it is a climate-controlled facility and because of the effects of high altitude on the ice surface. As a result, many world records have been broken there. It was at this place where the likes of Catriona Le May Doan and Cindy Klassen trained for their Olympic and world stardom.

Golf is also a popular sport in Calgary. Major courses include Heritage Pointe, Priddis Greens, the Glencoe Golf and Country Club, and the Calgary Golf and Country Club (these have been ranked among the top 100 in Canada). Calgary is also within a short drive of many top rated mountain courses including Banff Springs, Kananaskis, and Stewart Creek.

Two Soccer domes, located in south-east and north-west Calgary allow indoor play.

Other sporting venues include:

- Father David Bauer Olympic Arena
- Spruce Meadows
- GMC Stadium
- Max Bell Centre
- Glenmore Velodrome
- Don Hartman Northeast Sportsplex

=== Recreational and park facilities ===
Calgary is next to some of the most visited natural scenery in the world. Banff National Park is about 125 km northwest of Calgary on the Trans-Canada Highway. 30 km west of the city is the town of Bragg Creek. Another 45 km west of Bragg Creek is the Kananaskis Improvement District featuring hiking, horseback riding, and mountain-biking trails, camping sites, rock and ice climbing, and cross-country skiing. A Provincial shooting range for firearms is located on the highway to Kananaskis.

Many Calgarians and millions of tourists enjoy activities such as biking, hiking, skiing, snowboarding, mountain-boarding, camping, and fishing in these parks every year. The town of Banff hosts nearly five million visitors annually.

- Fish Creek Provincial Park, one of Canada's largest provincial park located within a major city
- Nose Hill Park
- Inglewood Bird Sanctuary
- Stanley Park
- Prince's Island Park
- Prairie Winds Park
- Bowness Park
- Edworthy Park
- Battalion Park
- Confederation Park
- Kananaskis Provincial Improvement District, approximately 60 km to the west and southwest
- Banff National Park, approximately 130 km to the west, UNESCO World Heritage Site

== Notable sporting events ==
Calgary hosts a number of annual sporting events. This includes the CSIO Spruce Meadows 'Masters' Tournament, one of the richest show jumping events in the world, which is held annually in September at Spruce Meadows. The Calgary Stampede is an annual rodeo held at Stampede Park and includes a number of equestrian sporting events.

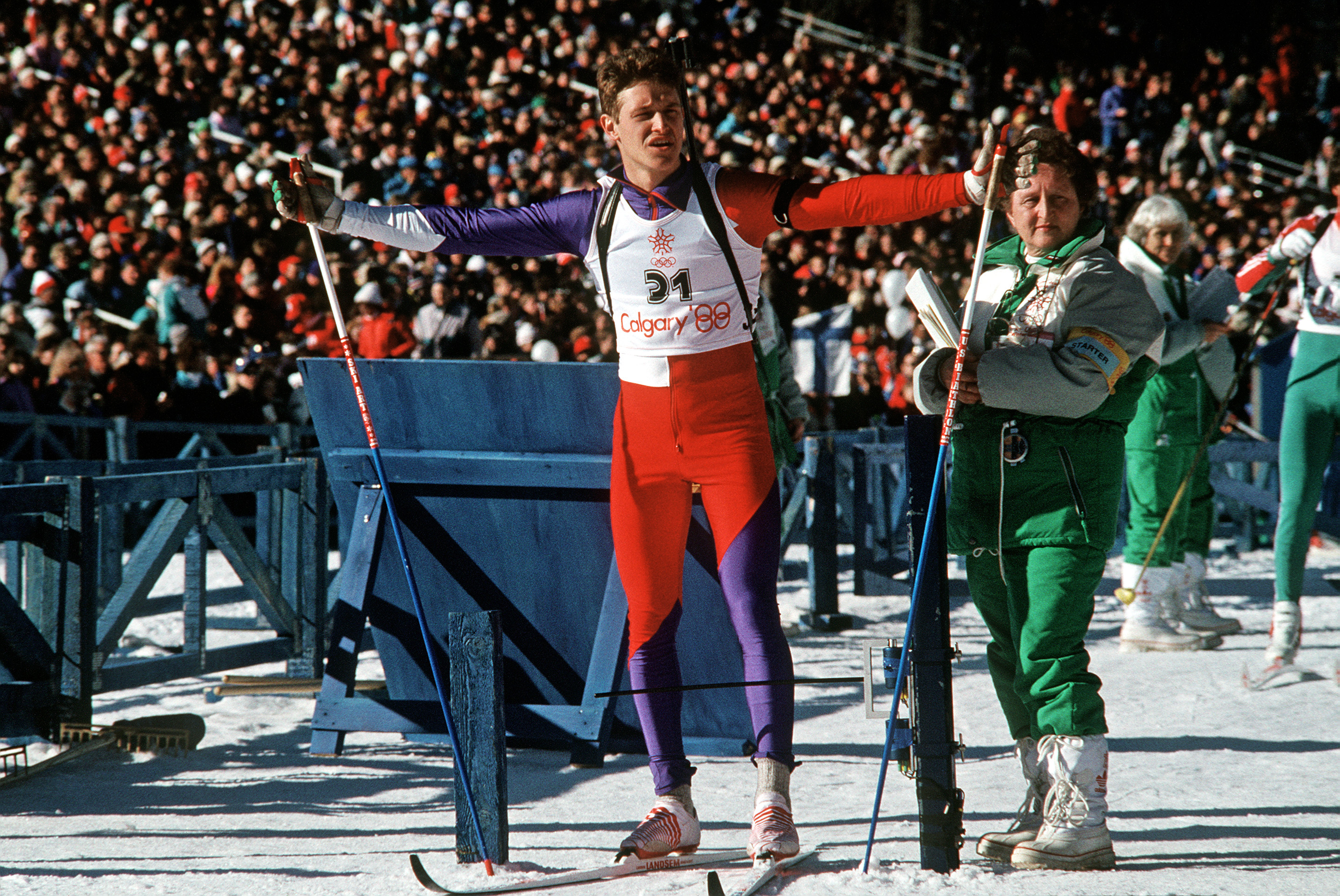
A competitor for the biathlon watches for the starting signal during the 1988 Winter Olympics in Calgary

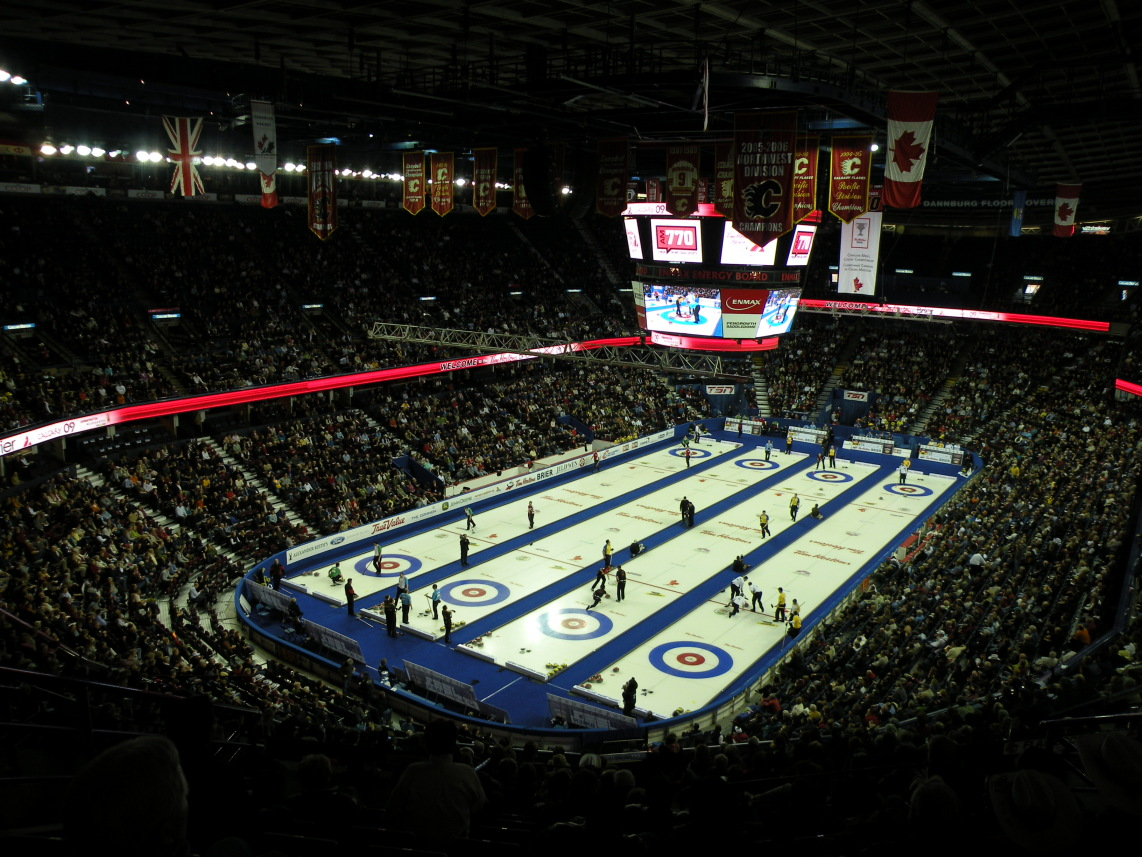
The 2009 Tim Hortons Brier was held at the Saddledome in Calgary

Calgary hosted the following major North American and International sporting events including:

- 1972 World Figure Skating Championships
- 1974 Memorial Cup
- 1975 63rd Grey Cup
- 1980 Labatt Brier
- 1985 37th NHL All-Star Game
- 1985 BWF World Championships
- 1986 Stanley Cup Final
- 1988 Winter Olympics
- 1989 Stanley Cup Final
- 1990 FIL World Luge Championships
- 1992 FIBT World Championships (Men's skeleton)
- 1993 FIL World Luge Championships
- 1993 81st Grey Cup
- 1996 FIBT World Championships
- 1996 Special Olympics Canada Winter Games
- 1997 Labatt Brier
- 1997 World Police and Fire Games
- 2000 88th Grey Cup
- 2000 World Aquatics Junior Diving Championships
- 2001 FIBT World Championships (Women's bobsleigh, men's and women's skeleton)
- 2001 FIL World Luge Championships
- 2002 Nokia Brier
- 2003 World Aquatics U20 Water Polo Championships
- 2004 Stanley Cup Final
- 2005 FIBT World Championships
- 2006 World Allround Speed Skating Championships
- 2006 World Figure Skating Championships
- 2009 Tim Hortons Brier
- 2009 97th Grey Cup
- 2012 World Junior Ice Hockey Championships
- 2015 Tim Hortons Brier
- 2019 107th Grey Cup
- 2021 Scotties Tournament of Hearts
- 2021 Tim Hortons Brier
- 2021 BKT Tires & OK Tire World Men's Curling Championship
- 2021 LGT World Women's Curling Championship
- 2021 IIHF Ice Hockey Women's World Championship

Calgary also bid for the 1964, 1968, and the 1972 Winter Olympics

== Sports ==
=== Cycling ===
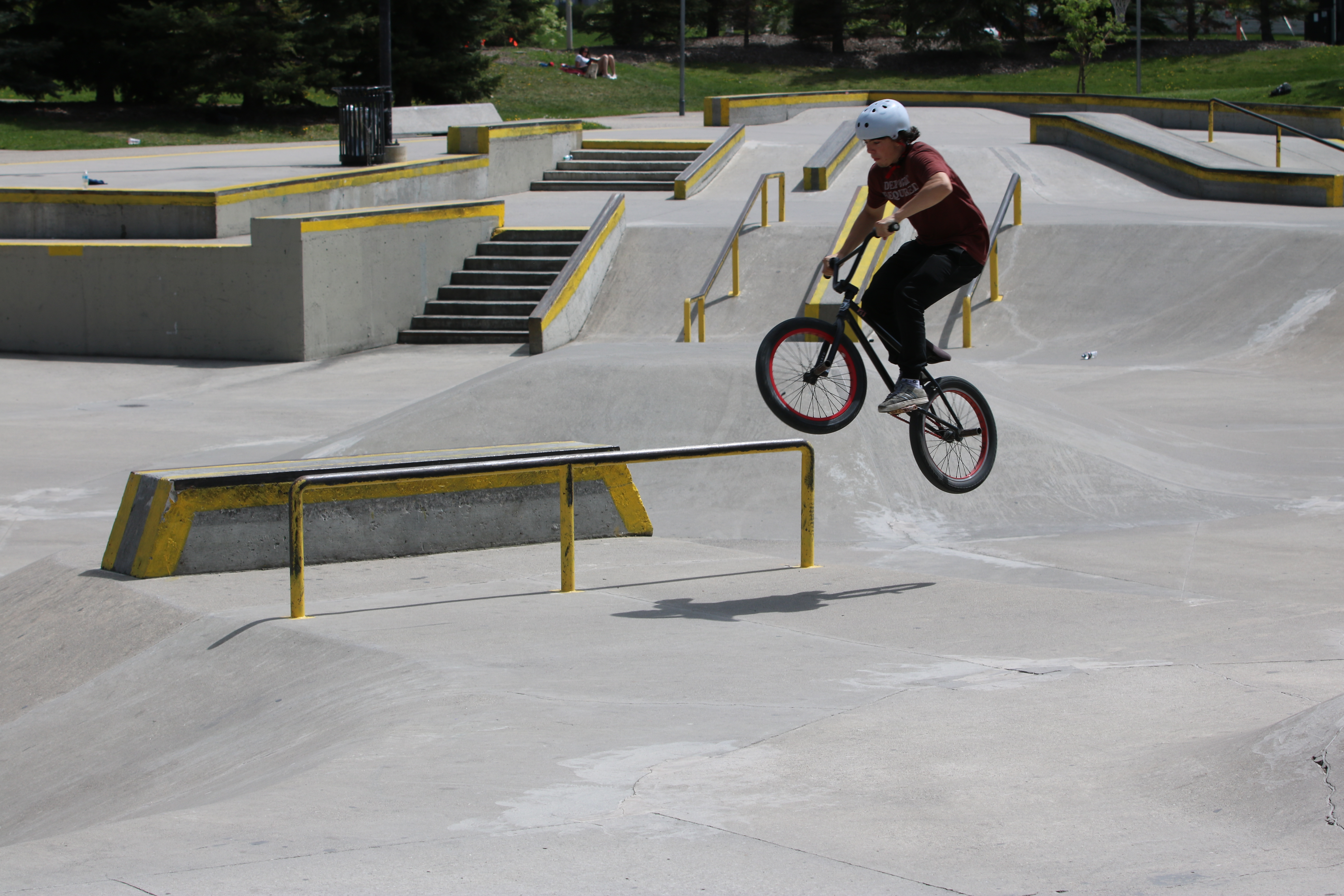
BMX biker at a Calgary skate park

Both Calgary and the Canadian Rockies are destinations for cycling and mountain biking. Within Calgary, a large bike path network exists (nearly 600 km) as part of the city's transportation infrastructure. It is used extensively both for commuting to work and for recreation as it connects most of the city's parks. Large parks such as Fish Creek Provincial Park and Nose Hill Park are also major destinations for cyclers.

In the summer, Canada Olympic Park functions as a venue for both cross-country and downhill cycling. The Glenmore Velodrome is an outdoor track facility in the city. The Calgary BMX Association also operates a BMX racing track near Blackfoot Trail.

There is a general cycling advocacy group, Bike Calgary.

=== Ice hockey ===
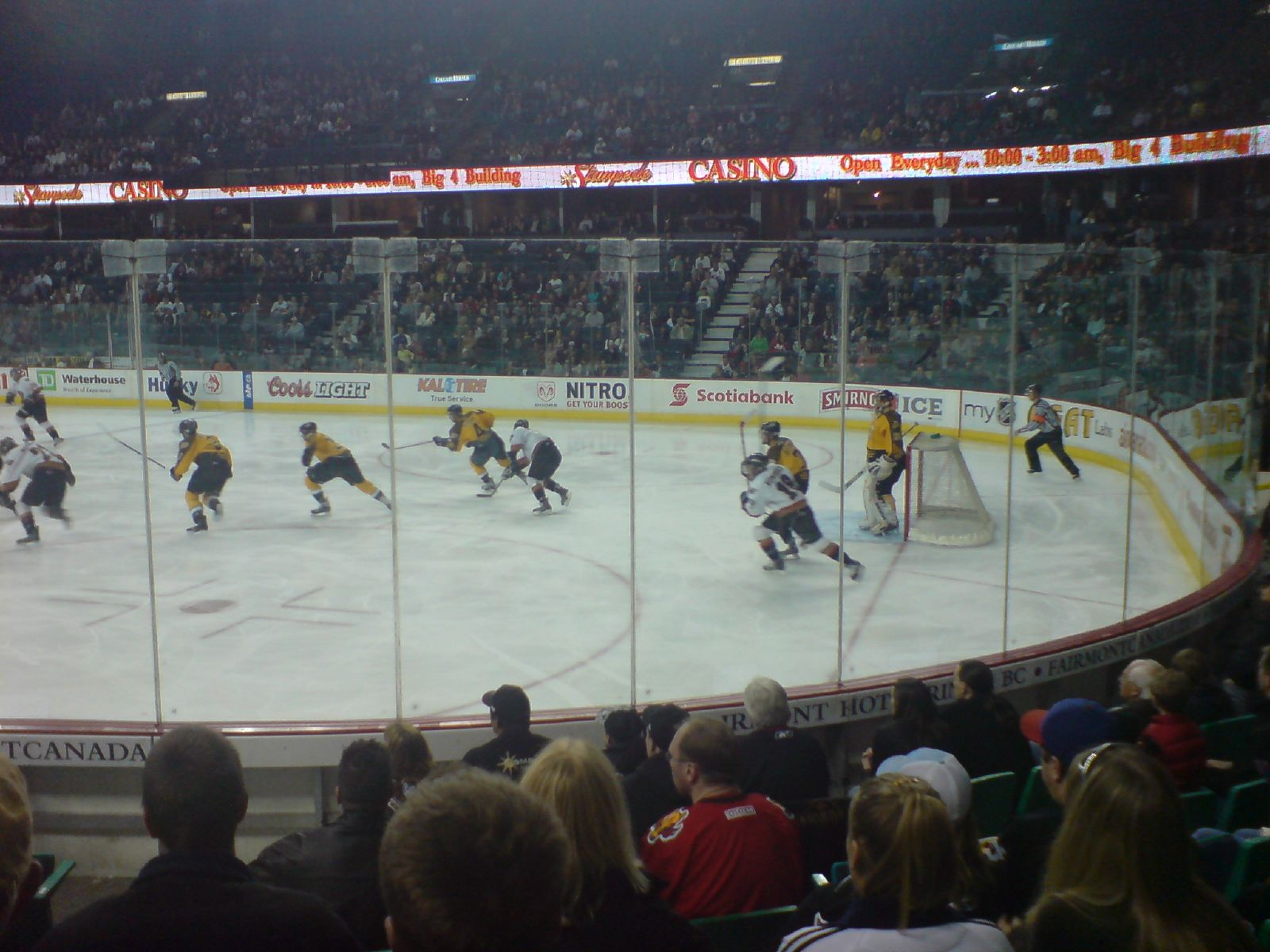
Spectators watch a game between the Calgary Hitmen and Brandon Wheat Kings at the Saddledome

Calgary has been home to the professional NHL team, the Calgary Flames since 1980, and their AHL affiliate team the Calgary Wranglers, who moved to Calgary in 2022. Calgary is also home to several junior hockey clubs, including a major junior team: the Calgary Hitmen of the WHL, and an entire junior "B" league, the Calgary Junior Hockey League. The city also plays host to Midget AAA World Invitational Tournament hockey tournament.

=== Professional wrestling ===
Calgary is also the home of the Hart wrestling family and the Hart House which previously housed "The Dungeon", a famous pro wrestling training camp founded by Stu Hart, the family patriarch, where he trained many wrestlers including all of his sons, most notably Bret and Owen Hart.

== Sport teams ==
=== Major league sports teams ===
Club	League	Venue	Established	Championships
Calgary Stampeders	CFL	McMahon Stadium	1945	8 (1948, 1971, 1992, 1998, 2001, 2008, 2014, 2018)
Calgary Flames	NHL	Scotiabank Saddledome	1980*	1 (1989)

(*) Established as the Atlanta Flames in 1972.

=== Other professional sports teams ===
Club	League	Venue	Established	Championships
Calgary Wranglers	AHL	Scotiabank Saddledome	2022*	0
Calgary Roughnecks	NLL	Scotiabank Saddledome	2001	3 (2004, 2009, 2019)
Cavalry FC	CanPL	ATCO Field	2018	1 (2024)
Calgary Surge	CEBL	Winsport Arena	2023**	0
Calgary Wild FC	NSL	McMahon Stadium	2025	0

(*) Established as the Maine Mariners in 1977.

(**) Established as the Guelph Nighthawks in 2013.

=== Amateur and junior clubs ===
Club	League	Venue	Established	Championships
Calgary Colts	Canadian Junior Football League	McMahon Stadium	1967	2
Calgary Canucks	Alberta Junior Hockey League	Henry Viney Arena	1971	9
Calgary Speed Skating Association	Speed Skating Canada	Olympic Oval	1990	10
Calgary Hitmen	Western Hockey League	Scotiabank Saddledome	1995	2
Calgary Kangaroos	United States Australian Football League	Inland Athletic Park	2002	0
Calgary Roller Derby	Women's Flat Track Derby Association	West Hillhurst Community Arena	2006	0
Calgary Kookaburras	Canada Women's Australian Football League	Queen Elizabeth High School	2007	2
Calgary RATH	National Ringette League	Various	2008	3
Prairie Wolf Pack	Canadian Rugby Championship	Calgary Rugby Park	2009	1
Calgary Rage	Western Women's Canadian Football League	Shouldice Park	2011*	0
Calgary Foothills FC	USL League Two	Foothills Composite High School	2014	1
Calgary Mountaineers	Rocky Mountain Lacrosse League	Stu Peppard Arena	2006	4
Raiders Lacrosse Club	Rocky Mountain Lacrosse League	Max Bell Centre	2003	11

(*) Established as the Calgary Rockies in 2009.

=== Defunct and former teams ===
Club	League	Years active	Championships
Calgary Tigers	Western Canada Hockey League	1920–1936	4
Calgary Cowboys	World Hockey Association	1975–1977	0
Calgary Wranglers	Western Hockey League	1977–1987	0
Calgary Mustangs	Alberta Junior Hockey League	1978–2019	1
Calgary Boomers	North American Soccer League	1980–1981	0
Calgary Cannons	Pacific Coast League	1985–2002	0
Calgary Kickers	Canadian Soccer League	1987–1989	1
Calgary 88s	World Basketball League	1988–1992	0
Calgary Rad'z	Roller Hockey International	1993–1994	0
Calgary Mavericks	Rugby Canada Super League	1998–2010	1
Calgary Oval X-Treme	National Women's Hockey League	2002–2009	5
Calgary Outlaws	Canadian Baseball League	2003	1
Calgary Drillers	American Basketball Association	2004–2005	0
Calgary Vipers	North American League	2005–2011	0
Calgary United F.C.	Canadian Major Indoor Soccer League	2007–2014	2
Calgary Inferno	Canadian Women's Hockey League	2011-2019	2
Calgary Crush	American Basketball Association	2012–2015	0

== See also ==
- Canada's Sports Hall of Fame
- Sports in Canada
