= Yevgeni Belosheikin =

Soviet ice hockey player (1966–1999)

- Born: April 17, 1966 Nevelsk, Soviet Union
- Died: November 18, 1999 (aged 33) Saint Petersburg, Russia
- Height: 5 ft 11 in (180 cm)
- Weight: 187 lb (85 kg; 13 st 5 lb)
- Position: Goaltender
- Caught: Left
- Played for: SKA St. Petersburg; HC CSKA Moscow
- National team: Soviet Union
- NHL draft: 232nd overall, 1991; Edmonton Oilers
- Playing career: 1983–1997

Yevgeni Belosheikin
Medal record

Representing Soviet Union

Men's ice hockey

Olympic Games
Gold medal – first place	1988 Calgary	Ice hockey

World Championships
Gold medal – first place	1986 Soviet Union	Ice hockey
Silver medal – second place	1987 Austria	Ice hockey

IIHF World Junior Championship
Gold medal – first place	1984 Sweden	Ice hockey
Bronze medal – third place	1985 Finland	Ice hockey
Gold medal – first place	1986 Canada	Ice hockey

Yevgeni Vladimirovich Belosheikin (Russian: Евгений Владимирович Белошейкин; April 17, 1966 – November 18, 1999) was a professional ice hockey player who played in the Soviet Hockey League. He played for the HC CSKA Moscow and SKA Leningrad. He also played on the Soviet Union's 1987 Canada Cup and Rendez-vous '87 teams. He was nicknamed "Evgeny the Great" and was touted as the next Vladislav Tretiak – and had even been tutored by Tretiak and wore his number 20, though their styles bore little resemblance.

In 1986 Belosheikin was named the outstanding goaltender of the 1986 IIHF World U20 Championships in Hamilton, Canada. During the tournament the U.S.S.R went undefeated, winning 7 games and Belosheikin allowed only 8 goals in 5 games (He shared goal tending with Oleg Bratash in 1985 and 1986.).

He was the starting goalie for the U.S.S.R. during the 1986 and 1987 Ice Hockey World Championships, when he won a gold and silver medal.

On New Year's Eve 1986, Belosheikin led the Soviets to a 4-1 win over Canada and was also named the outstanding goaltender in the 1987 Calgary Cup, a pre-Olympic tournament.

He played 3 games, including the classic double-overtime second final game, in the 1987 Canada Cup.

During the 1988 Winter Olympics he was the U.S.S.R.'s third (or secondary back up) goalie and did not dress for any games (but, like Nikolai Khabibulin at the next Winter Olympics, who also did not play, Belosheikin was a member of the gold medal winning team.)

Belosheikin's final game of his international career was on February 2, 1988 with a 4-1 win in an exhibition game against Finland.

Though he was considered the heir apparent to Vladislav Tretiak as the next great Soviet goaltender, Belosheikin suffered problems with alcoholism. After being drugged and robbed after a night of drinking with teammate Alexei Gusarov, he suffered liver and vision problems, which hastened the end of his career. In 1991 the Edmonton Oilers selected him in the 11th round, 232nd overall in the NHL entry draft, though Belosheikin reported to camp that year, he was immediately sent to the Oilers Cape Breton affiliate where he played only 3 games. Belosheikin never played in the NHL.

Belosheikin died by suicide on November 18, 1999.

== Career statistics ==
=== International ===
Year	Team	Event	GP	W	L	T	MIN	GA	SO	GAA	SV%
1984	Soviet Union	WJC	5	—	—	—	300	16	-	3.20	—
1985	Soviet Union	WJC	6	—	—	—	348	16	-	2.76	—
1986	Soviet Union	WJC	5	—	—	—	300	8	-	1.60	—
1986	Soviet Union	WC	7	7	0	0	420	11	2	1.57	.915
1987	Soviet Union	WC	10	8	0	2	600	15	3	1.50	—
1987	Soviet Union	Calgary Cup	4	3	1	0	240	4	1	1.00	—
1987	Soviet Union	CC	3	0	2	1	210	14	0	4.00	.880
1988	Soviet Union	OLY	0	0	0	0	0	0	0	-	—
Junior totals			16	—	—	—	-	-	-	-	—
Senior totals			24	18	3	3	1470	44	6	1.79	—
