= Alena Polenská =

Czech ice hockey player

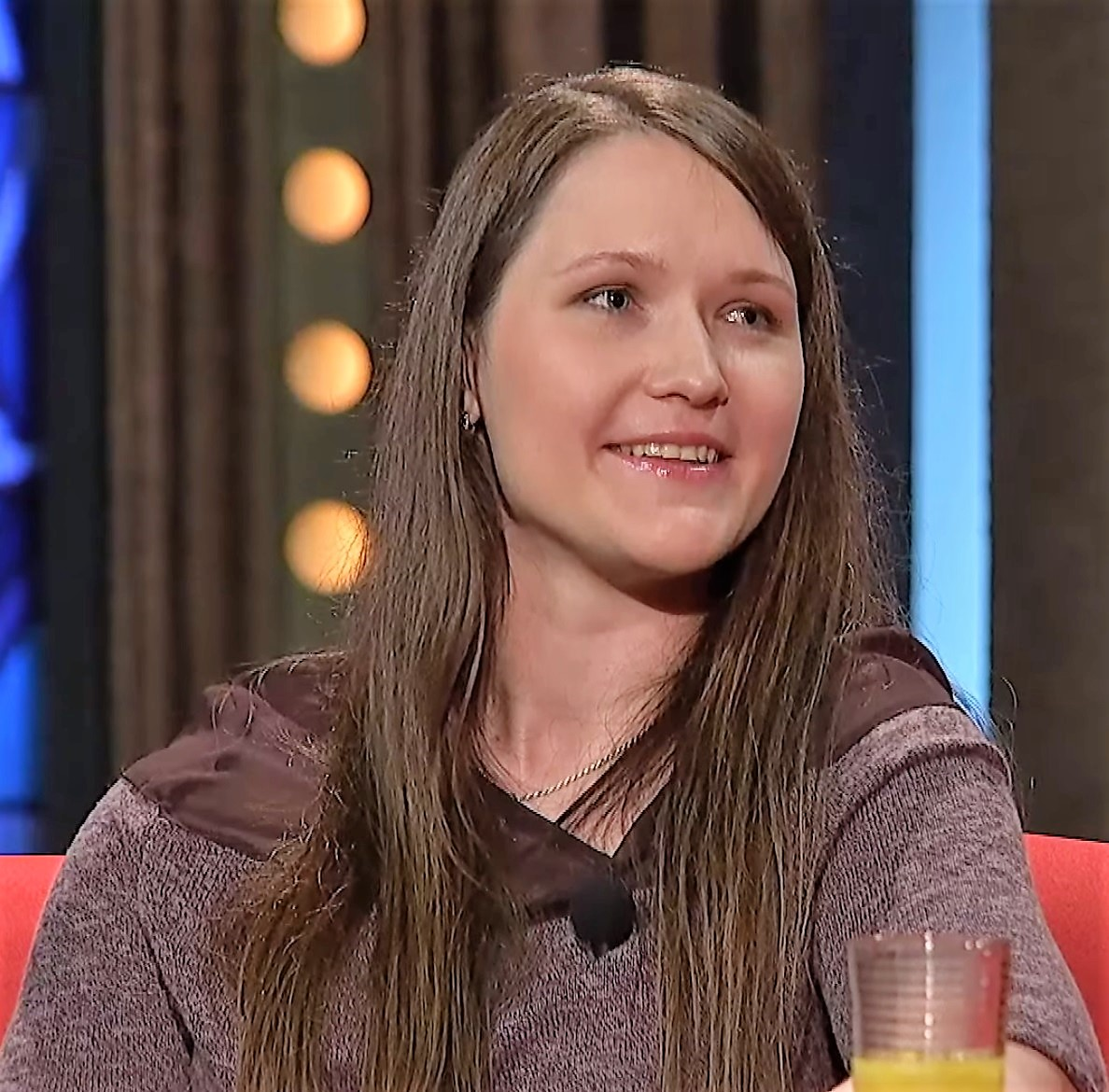
- Polenská on Show Jana Krause in 2019
- Born: 9 June 1990 (age 36) Kutná Hora, Czechoslovakia
- Height: 172 cm (5 ft 8 in)
- Weight: 79 kg (174 lb; 12 st 6 lb)
- Position: Forward
- Shoots: Left
- SWHL A team Former teams: ZSC Lions Frauen: Agidel Ufa; Brynäs IF; KRS Vanke Rays; HPK Hämeenlinna; Dinamo St. Petersburg; Brown Bears
- National team: Czech Republic
- Playing career: 2004–present
Medal record
World Championship
Bronze medal – third place	2022 Denmark
Bronze medal – third place	2023 Canada
World U18 Championship
Bronze medal – third place	2008 Canada

Alena Polenská (previously Mills; born 9 June 1990) is a Czech ice hockey player and former captain of the Czech Republic women's national ice hockey team. She plays in the Swiss Women's League (SWHL A) with the ZSC Lions Frauen.

Polenská was part of the first Czech team to participate in a top-level tournament of the IIHF Women's World Championship (2013 tournament) and was captain of the first Czech team to earn a medal at the Women's World Championship (2022).

== Playing career ==
She won a bronze medal for the Czech Republic at the 2008 IIHF World Women's U18 Championship. In the bronze medal game, Polenská scored two goals. At the 2008 Roller Hockey World Championships, she won a gold medal. It marked the first time that a European team had won the event. On August 12, 2010, she was named captain of the Czech Republic Olympic Development Team.

=== NCAA ===
Polenská joined the Brown Bears women's ice hockey program in the autumn of 2009 and appeared in 28 games during her freshman campaign. Her five goals tied for first on the squad, and her 96 shots on goal led all Bears skaters. On January 31, 2010, versus Yale, she registered two assists. In an exhibition game versus the Etobicoke Dolphins on 17 October 2010, Polenská scored two goals in a 5–2 victory.

=== Russia ===
Polenská played in Russia from 2014 to 2022. Her first season was played in the Russian Women's Hockey League (RWHL) with Dinamo Saint Petersburg, and she then remained with the club as the RWHL was replaced by the Zhenskaya Hockey League for the 2015–16 season. After four seasons with Dinamo, she signed with Agidel Ufa in 2018. With Agidel, Polenská won the 2019 Russian Championship and was selected for the ZhHL All-Star Game in 2019 and 2020. Following that season, she signed with the KRS Vanke Rays

=== Sweden ===
After leaving the Vanke Rays, Polenská signed with Brynäs IF. She left Brynäs following the 2022–23 season.

== International play ==
Polenská was a stalwart member of the Czech national team for nearly two decades. She served as captain from 2010 until her retirement from international competition in 2023 and led the team through promotion to the Top Division, as well as their first World Championship medal victory. She and figure skater Michal Březina served as flag bearers for the Czech delegation at the opening ceremony of the 2022 Winter Olympics. After playing 260 international games, Polenská announced her retirement from the national team in June 2023.

== Personal life ==
Polenská's Czech Republic jersey from the 2008 IIHF U18 Women's World Championship was displayed at the Hockey Hall of Fame in Toronto.

In June 2018, she married American ex-pat Thomas Mills, who she met while playing in Saint Petersburg. She returned to using her maiden name in 2024.

== Career statistics ==
=== Regular season and playoffs ===
			Regular season					Playoffs
Season	Team	League	GP	G	A	Pts	PIM	GP	G	A	Pts	PIM
2009–10	Brown University	NCAA	28	5	5	10	12	–	–	–	–	–
2010–11	Brown University	NCAA	26	10	7	17	12	–	–	–	–	–
2011–12	Brown University	NCAA	23	7	8	15	12	–	–	–	–	–
2012–13	Brown University	NCAA	22	9	10	19	16	–	–	–	–	–
2014–15	Dinamo St. Petersburg	RWHL	32	22	21	43	18	–	–	–	–	–
2015–16	Dinamo St. Petersburg	ZhHL	24	20	16	36	10	–	–	–	–	–
2016–17	Dinamo St. Petersburg	ZhHL	36	13	16	36	10	–	–	–	–	–
2017–18	Dinamo St. Petersburg	ZhHL	24	5	11	16	10	2	0	0	0	0
2018–19	Agidel Ufa	ZhHL	32	22	14	36	14	6	0	1	1	2
2019–20	Agidel Ufa	ZhHL	28	12	17	29	12	5	2	3	5	6
2020–21	KRS Vanke Rays	ZhHL	28	9	13	22	34	5	5	1	6	6
2021–22	HPK	Naisten Liiga	6	3	0	3	0	–	–	–	–	–
NCAA totals			99	31	30	61	52	–	–	–	–	–
Russia totals			204	103	108	211	136	18	7	5	12	14

=== International ===
Year	Team	Event	Result	GP	G	A	Pts	PIM
2004	Czech Republic	OGQ	DNQ	2	0	0	0	2
2005	Czech Republic	WWC D1	3rd	5	0	2	2	4
2008	Czech Republic	U18	3rd place, bronze medalist(s)	5	6	3	9	0
2008	Czech Republic	WWC D1	3rd	5	1	4	5	8
2008	Czech Republic	OGQ	DNQ	3	4	1	5	0
2009	Czech Republic	WWC D1	5th	5	2	4	6	2
2011	Czech Republic	WWC D2	1st	4	1	6	7	0
2012	Czech Republic	WWC D1A	1st	5	3	2	5	2
2013	Czech Republic	OGQ	DNQ	3	1	0	1	2
2013	Czech Republic	WWC	8th	5	1	1	2	6
2014	Czech Republic	WWC D1A	1st	5	4	3	7	4
2014	Czech Republic	WWQ	DNQ	3	1	0	1	2
2015	Czech Republic	WWC D1A	1st	5	4	3	7	0
2016	Czech Republic	WWC	6th	5	3	2	5	0
2017	Czech Republic	OGQ	DNQ	3	0	1	1	0
2017	Czech Republic	WWC	8th	6	0	1	1	4
2019	Czech Republic	WW	6th	5	2	3	5	2
2021	Czech Republic	WWC	7th	6	5	2	7	4
2021	Czech Republic	OGQ	Q	3	3	1	4	2
2022	Czech Republic	WWC	3rd place, bronze medalist(s)	7	1	2	3	2
2023	Czech Republic	WWC	3rd place, bronze medalist(s)	6	1	1	2	2
Junior totals				5	6	3	9	0
Senior totals				91	37	39	76	48

== Awards and honors ==
- Most Valuable Player for the Czech Republic, 2008 U18 World Championship
- Most Valuable Player, Princeton Tiger Lilies, 2009

Olympic Games
Preceded by Eva Samková	Flagbearer for Czech Republic; Beijing 2022 with Michal Březina	Succeeded by David Pastrňák; Lucie Charvátová
