= Calgary Buffaloes (AJHL) =

Ice hockey team in Alberta, Canada

- City: Calgary, Alberta
- League: Alberta Junior Hockey League
- Founded: 1963; 63 years ago
- Folded: 1970; 56 years ago

Franchise history
- 1963-1966: Calgary Buffaloes
- 1966-1970: Calgary Cowboys

The Calgary Buffaloes were a Junior A ice hockey team in the Alberta Junior Hockey League based in Calgary, Alberta. They were one of the five founding members of the AJHL in 1963.

The Buffaloes captured the AJHL title each of their first three seasons, earning the right to face the Edmonton Oil Kings for the right to play for the Memorial Cup. All three seasons, the Buffaloes were defeated by the powerful Oil Kings.

In 1965, the cross-town Calgary Cowboys withdrew from the AJHL with most of their players moving to the Buffaloes. Prior to the 1966–67 season, the Buffaloes renamed themselves the Cowboys, as a new Western Canada Junior Hockey League team took over the Buffaloes name. The team retained the Cowboys moniker until it folded midway through the 1969–70 season.

== Season-by-season Record ==
Note: GP = Games played, W = Wins, L = Losses, T = Ties, Pts = Points, GF = Goals for, GA = Goals against

Season	GP	W	L	T	GF	GA	Points	Finish	Playoffs
1963–64^{1}	NA	NA	NA	NA	NA	NA	NA	NA	Won League; lost Alberta playoffs
1964–65	-	-	-	-	-	-	-	---	Won League; lost Alberta playoffs
1965–66	-	-	-	-	-	-	-	---	Won League; lost Alberta playoffs
1966–67	-	-	-	-	-	-	-	---	
1967–68	-	-	-	-	-	-	-	---	
1968–69	-	-	-	-	-	-	-	---	
1969–70^{2}	50	2	48	0	57	161	4	6th overall	Out of playoffs

^{1}No regular season was played in 1963–64, League had a playoff only to determine champion
^{2}Folded after 25 games. Remaining 25 games were forfeited to the five remaining clubs
Note:Stats prior to 1969-70 have been lost to the Alberta Junior Hockey League

== See also ==
- List of ice hockey teams in Alberta
- Ice hockey in Calgary
- Calgary Canucks
- Calgary Spurs
- Calgary Royals
