= 2007 IIHF World Women's U18 Championship Qualification =

2007 IIHF Women's U18 Invitational Tournaments
Tournament details
- Host countries: Finland; Czechia; Germany
- Dates: February 2007
- Format: Round-robin
- Teams: 12

The 2007 IIHF U18 Women's World Championship Qualification comprised three Women's U18 Invitational Tournaments organized by the International Ice Hockey Federation (IIHF) during February 2007. Each tournament determined two of the participating eight teams for the inaugural IIHF World Women's U18 Championship in 2008. The other two teams, Canada and the United States, were automatically offered spots and did not participate in any invitational tournaments.

== Participating teams ==
Group A	Group B	Group C
Finland	Austria	France
Japan	Czech Republic	Germany
Netherlands	Kazakhstan	Russia
Switzerland	Sweden	Slovakia

== Group A ==
The Group A tournament was held at Versowood Areena in Vierumäki, Finland during 9–11 February. The national under-18 teams of Finland, Japan, the Netherlands, and Switzerland participated.

Finland collected three wins to decisively earn a spot at the 2008 U18 Women's World Championship while Switzerland narrowly qualified thanks to two overtime goals scored by Sara Benz.

=== Standings ===
Pos	Team	Pld	W	OTW	OTL	L	GF	GA	GD	Pts
1	Finland	3	3	0	0	0	24	1	+23	9
2	Switzerland	3	0	2	0	1	6	5	+1	4
3	Japan	3	1	0	1	1	5	9	−4	4
4	Netherlands	3	0	0	1	2	5	25	−20	1

Source: HockeyArchives.info

=== Results ===
9 February 2007	Netherlands	2–3 OT (1–2, 0–0, 1–0) (OT: 0–1)	Switzerland	Versowood Areena, Vierumäki; Attendance: 11

9 February 2007	Finland	4–0 (1–0, 2–0, 1–0)	Japan	Versowood Areena, Vierumäki; Attendance: 87

10 February 2007	Switzerland	2–1 OT (1–0, 0–0, 0–1) (OT: 1–0)	Japan	Versowood Areena, Vierumäki; Attendance: 57

10 February 2007	Finland	18–0 (5–0, 7–0, 6–0)	Netherlands	Versowood Areena, Vierumäki; Attendance: 78

11 February 2007	Finland	2–1 (1–0, 0–1, 1–0)	Switzerland	Versowood Areena, Vierumäki; Attendance: 63

11 February 2007	Japan	4–3 (0–0, 4–0, 3–0)	Netherlands	Versowood Areena, Vierumäki; Attendance: 29

== Group B ==
Group B was held in Nymburk, Czech Republic from 9–11 February 2007.

=== Standings ===
Pl.		GP	W	OTW	OTL	L	GF–GA	Pts
1.	Sweden	3	3	0	0	0	11:3	9
2.	Czech Republic	3	2	0	0	1	15:4	6
3.	Austria	3	1	0	0	2	5:10	3
4.	Kazakhstan	3	0	0	0	3	4:18	0

=== Results ===
9. February 2007	Kazakhstan	1:4 (0:2, 0:1, 1:1)	Sweden	Zimní stadión, Nymburk; Attendance: 44
9. February 2007	Czech Republic	3:1 (0:1, 3:0, 0:0)	Austria	Zimní stadión, Nymburk; Attendance: 115
10. February 2007	Sweden	5:1 (2:0, 1:0, 2:1)	Austria	Zimní stadión, Nymburk; Attendance: 37
10. February 2007	Czech Republic	11:1 (4:1, 6:0, 1:0)	Kazakhstan	Zimní stadión, Nymburk; Attendance: 131
11. February 2007	Austria	3:2 (0:1, 3:1, 0:0)	Kazakhstan	Zimní stadión, Nymburk; Attendance: 39
11. February 2007	Czech Republic	1:2 (0:0, 1:1, 0:1)	Sweden	Zimní stadión, Nymburk; Attendance: 171

== Group C ==
Group C was held in Bad Tölz, Bavaria, Germany from 16–18 February 2007.

=== Standings ===
Pl.		GP	W	OTW	OTL	L	GF–GA	Pts
1.	Germany	3	3	0	0	0	21:3	9
2.	Russia	3	2	0	0	1	15:13	6
3.	Slovakia	3	1	0	0	2	4:9	3
4.	France	3	0	0	0	3	6:21	0

=== Results ===
16. February 2007	France	3:8 (0:4, 1:2, 2:2)	Russia	Hacker-Pschorr Arena, Bad Tölz; Attendance: 43
16. February 2007	Germany	2:0 (1:0, 1:0, 0:0)	Slovakia	Hacker-Pschorr Arena, Bad Tölz; Attendance: 140
17. February 2007	Russia	5:1 (3:1, 1:0, 1:0)	Slovakia	Hacker-Pschorr Arena, Bad Tölz
17. February 2007	Germany	10:1 (1:0, 6:0, 3:1)	France	Hacker-Pschorr Arena, Bad Tölz; Attendance: 200
18. February 2007	Slovakia	3:2 (1:0, 1:0, 1:2)	France	Hacker-Pschorr Arena, Bad Tölz; Attendance: 125
18. February 2007	Germany	9:2 (1:1, 4:0, 4:1)	Russia	Hacker-Pschorr Arena, Bad Tölz; Attendance: 420

== Qualified teams ==
Qualified for 2008 tournament:	Germany; Finland; Russia; Sweden; Switzerland; Czech Republic
