= Father David Bauer Olympic Arena =

Ice hockey arena in Calgary, Alberta

Coordinates: 51°04′26″N 114°07′35″W

David Bauer Arena
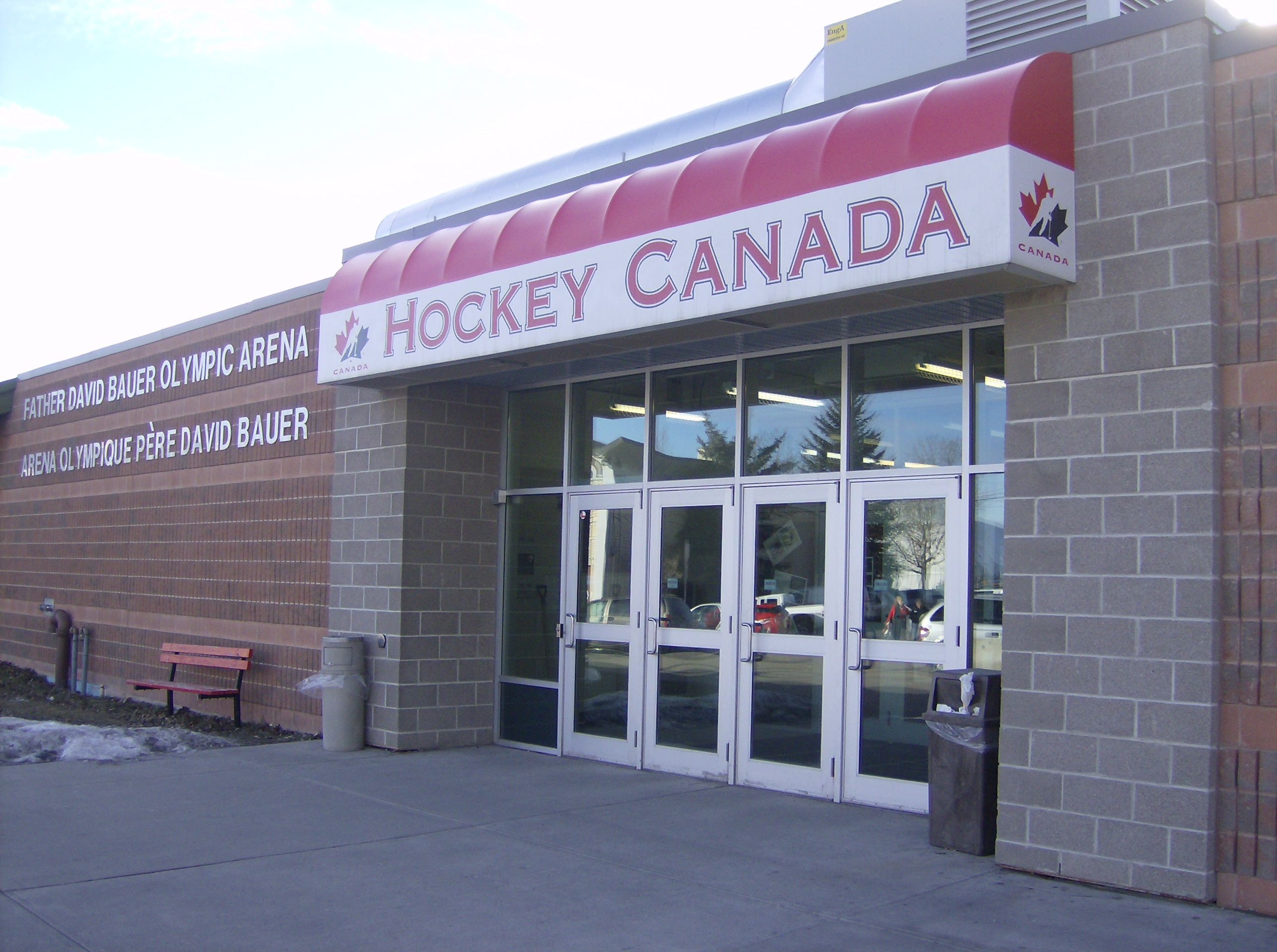
- Main entrance in 2007
- Interactive map of David Bauer Arena
- Full name: Father David Bauer Arena
- Address: 2424 University Dr; Calgary; Canada
- Owner: City of Calgary
- Capacity: 1,750 (seated, hockey)
- Type: Ice hockey arena
- Surface: Ice
- Current use: Ice hockey

Construction
- Opened: 1963; 63 years ago

Tenants
- Calgary Dinos (U Sports) (1963-present); Calgary Mustangs (AJHL) (1990-2019)

Website
- calgary.ca/father-david-bauer

The Father David Bauer Arena is an ice hockey arena in Calgary, Alberta, Canada. It seats about 1,750 for hockey with a standing room capacity of over 2,000. It is named after Father David Bauer.

Canada's defunct national touring team, the brainchild of Bauer, also staged tryouts there. The arena was built in 1963.

The arena uses the 200 by 100 feet (61 by 30 m) (or Olympic) sized ice surface. A second arena, the Norma Bush Arena is attached to the facility, and has a 185 by 85 feet (56 by 26 m) artificial ice surface.

The arena was the home of the Calgary Mustangs of the Alberta Junior Hockey League and is the home arena for the Calgary Dinos university hockey team. It is also the home of the Western Hockey League major junior circuit, the AAA Midget Flames of the Alberta Midget Hockey League and is often used as the training facility for the Canadian Olympic and junior national teams.

FDB also hosts games for the annual Mac's AAA midget hockey tournament.

The arena was used for a few ice hockey games at the 1988 Winter Olympics as well as the compulsory figures section of the men's and women's figure skating competitions .

The arena is located in the same complex as McMahon Stadium, adjacent to the University of Calgary.

== See also ==
- Sport in Calgary
