= Calgary Cup =

Canadian ice hockey tournament

The Calgary Cup was a four-team ice hockey tournament held from December 26, 1986, to January 3, 1987, in Calgary, Alberta, Canada. It was a test event for the 1988 Winter Olympics, and featured the national hockey teams of Canada, Czechoslovakia, the Soviet Union and the United States. All games were held at the Olympic Saddledome.

The tournament was won by Czechoslovakia, who defeated the Soviet Union 3–2 in the gold medal game. Canada won the bronze. Jiří Hrdina was named the tournament's top forward, Jaroslav Benák was named top defenceman and Yevgeni Belosheikin the top goaltender. Legendary Soviet goaltender Vladislav Tretiak was the honorary chairman of the tournament.

Many future National Hockey League players played in the Calgary Cup. In addition to Hrdina, Brett Hull, Dominik Hašek, Joe Nieuwendyk, Zarley Zalapski, Cliff Ronning, Viacheslav Fetisov and Sergei Makarov, among others, suited up for their respective national teams.

== Game play ==
The Calgary Cup was organized as one of several test events for the 1988 Winter Olympics, set to be held in Calgary thirteen months after this tournament. It featured the national teams of Canada, the United States, the Soviet Union and Czechoslovakia, as international hockey's dominant powers of the time, in a round-robin tournament that would see the top two teams meet in a gold medal game, and the bottom two play for the bronze. The tournament would also help the Canadian and American teams prepare for the European style of play.

The tournament opened on December 27, 1986, with the host Canadians facing the United States. The American team, which had formed only 36 hours previous, had only one full workout together prior to the game. They nonetheless shocked the Canadians, winning by a 5–3 score on the strength of two goals by Brett Hull. Obviously disappointed with his team's result, Canadian coach Dave King stated: "We're obviously behind the eight ball. We have to go out and beat the Czechs and Russians, I guess. That'll be fun."

The second game saw the Soviet Union defeat the Czechoslovaks 4–0 on the strength of a shutout by Soviet goaltender Yevgeni Belosheikin. The goaltender, who had previously been suspended prior to the tournament for what was rumoured to be alcohol problems, earned comparisons to legendary Soviet goaltender Vladislav Tretiak. The Czechoslovaks rebounded the next night with a 6–3 victory over the Canadians in a game that left the home squad feeling much better than following the loss to the Americans.

The Soviets pummelled the Americans 10–1 in the fourth game as eight different Soviet players scored. Describing the loss, American coach Craig Patrick said the Soviets made the Americans look like "the guys who travel with the Harlem Globetrotters. At times, you can look pretty foolish." The Soviets then defeated Canada 4–1 on New Year's Eve in a game that was tied at one heading to the third period. The Russians outshot Canada 45–19 in the contest.

The final game of the round robin saw Czechoslovakia embarrass the United States 11–2 on the strength of a Jiří Hrdina hat trick. As a result, the Czechoslovaks earned a match-up against the Soviet Union for the gold medal, while Canada would face the Americans for the bronze.

== Results ==
=== Final standings ===
Team	GP	W	L	T	PTS	GF	GA
Soviet Union	3	3	0	0	6	18	2
Czechoslovakia	3	2	1	0	4	17	9
United States	3	1	2	0	2	8	24
Canada	3	0	3	0	0	7	15

December 27, 1986; 7:00PM	Canada	3–5 ( 1–1, 2–3, 0–1 )	United States	Olympic Saddledome; Attendance: 13,175

First period Ronning 2:33 (ES); Second period Felix 0:19 (PP); Nieuwendyk 6:09 (PP); Third period No scoring / Goals / First period Hull 4:44 (ES); Second period Hull 7:04 (ES); Johnson 8:28 (ES); Middendorf 17:22 (ES); Third period Micheletti 17:21 (ES)

December 28, 1986; 7:00PM	Czechoslovakia	0–4 ( 0–2, 0–1, 0–1 )	Soviet Union	Olympic Saddledome; Attendance: 9,996

First period No scoring Second period No scoring Third period No scoring / Goals / First period Fetisov 3:17 (PP); Khomutov 7:35 (ES); Second period Varnakov 16:49 (ES); Third period Khymlev 2:44 (ES)

December 30, 1986; 7:00PM	Czechoslovakia	6–3 ( 3–1, 1–1, 2–1 )	Canada	Olympic Saddledome; Attendance: 13,240

First period Vlk 9:51 (ES); Čajka 12:27 (ES); Černý18:58 (ES); Second period Černý 5:16 (ES); Third period Volek 13:00 (ES); Volek 19:57 (EN) / Goals / First period Sherven 10:31 (ES); Second period Berry 19:41 (ES); Third period Nieuwendyk 14:50 (ES)

December 30, 1986; 7:00PM	Soviet Union	10–1 ( 3–0, 5–1, 2–0 )	United States	Olympic Saddledome; Attendance: 10,777

First period Khymlev 7:30 (ES); Kamensky 10:20 (PP); Krutov 12:58; Second period Svetlov 1:43; Priakhin 2:54 (ES); Khmlyev 6:24 (PP); Makarov 7:35 (PP); Fetisov 17:24 (PP); Third period Kamensky 8:51 (ES); Khomutov 16:07 (ES) / Goals / First period No scoring Second period Mersch 5:37 (SH); Third period No scoring

December 31, 1986; 7:00PM	Soviet Union	4–1 ( 1–0, 0–1, 3–0 )	Canada	Olympic Saddledome; Attendance: 13,240

First period Kamensky 16:46 (ES); Second period No scoring Third period Makarov 4:11 (ES); Semenov 8:16 (ES); Larionov 19:48 (EN) / Goals / First period No scoring Second period Vilgrain 10:51 (ES); Third period No scoring

January 1, 1987; 11:30AM	United States	2–11 ( 1–4, 0–5, 1–2 )	Czechoslovakia	Olympic Saddledome; Attendance: 11,988

First period Vargas 18:16 (ES); Second period No scoring Third period Vargas 4:15 (ES) / Goals / First period Hrdina 5:46 (PP); Doležal 12:24 (ES); Stavjaňa 17:04 (ES); Volek 19:15 (ES); Second period Hrdina 1:06 (ES); Dolana 3:02 (ES); Vlk 15:40 (ES); Šejba 16:25 (ES); Volek 17:13 (ES); Third period Pašek 15:14 (ES); Hrdina 19:47 (ES)

Bronze medal game

January 2, 1987; 7:00PM	Canada	6–1 ( 1–0, 3–1, 2–0 )	United States	Olympic Saddledome; Attendance: 12,519

First period Ronning 14:27 (PP); Second period Zalapski 1:48 (PP); Stiles 7:36 (ES); Schreiber 8:19 (SH); Third period Habscheid 8:29 (ES); Habscheid 16:16 (ES) / Goals / First period No scoring Second period Turcotte 15:26 (ES); Third period No scoring

Gold medal game

January 3, 1987; 7:00PM	Czechoslovakia	3–2 ( 2–0, 1–0, 0–2 )	Soviet Union	Olympic Saddledome; Attendance: 16,343

First period Cerni 3:04 (ES); Růžička 8:16 (PP); Second period Pašek 10:24 (PP); Third period No scoring / Goals / First period No scoring Second period No scoring Third period Svetlov 14:18; Khomutov 19:36 (ES)

== See also ==
- Ice hockey at the 1988 Winter Olympics
- Ice hockey in Calgary
