= IIHF U18 Women's World Championship =

Women's under-18 ice hockey national teams tournament

IIHF Ice Hockey U18 Women's World Championship
- Upcoming season or competition: 2027 IIHF U18 Women's World Championship
- Sport: Ice hockey
- Founded: 2008
- Founder: International Ice Hockey Federation
- First season: 2008
- No. of teams: 8 in Top Division; 12 in Division I; 12 in Division II; 4 in Division III
- Most recent champion: United States (10th title) (2026)
- Most titles: United States (10 titles)

The IIHF U18 Women's World Championship, officially the IIHF Ice Hockey U18 Women's World Championship, is an annual ice hockey tournament for national women's under-18 (U18) ice hockey teams, administered by the International Ice Hockey Federation (IIHF). It is the junior edition of the IIHF Women's World Championship and participation is limited to female ice hockey players under 18 years of age.

== History ==
A qualification tournament was held in 2007 to finalize divisional placement and the inaugural championship was held in Calgary, Alberta, Canada, in January 2008. The United States' national team has won ten championships while the Canadian national team has won eight. Neither nation has ever ranked lower than third place. The third most successful team in championship history is the Swedish national team, which was the only nation to unseat either of the top North American teams to claim silver (2018, 2023) until Czechia did so in 2024. Both Canada and the United States have won seven silver medals. The all-time bronze medal winners are Sweden (5), Russia (3), Canada (2), Czechia (2), Finland (2), and United States (1).

Thirty-five countries participated in the most recent championship (2025) across three divisions: Top Division, Division I, and Division II. As with other IIHF tournaments, there is an active system of promotion and relegation between the groups and divisions, the winner of each group gains promotion to the group or division directly above for the following tournament and the lowest ranking team in relegated to the group or division below. Through this system, no two consecutive championships feature the same teams in each group or division and it is possible for a team to rise from Division IIB to the Top Division or fall from the Top Division to Division IIB in the span of five tournaments – though no team has ever accomplished such a meteoric rise or fall. The Top Division is the only division to confer the title of World Champion and comprises the teams ranked first through eighth in the world. Division I comprises twelve teams organized into two groups of six teams each, classified as Group IA and IB. Division II comprises eight teams organized into two groups of four teams each, classified as Groups IIA and IIB. Winning a gold medal in a divisional tournament below the Top Division corresponds with the numeric placement from first, i.e. the Division IA gold medal team ranks 9th in the world, the Division IB gold medal team ranks 15th in the world, and so on.

The tournament can be interpreted as the women's counterpart of both the IIHF World Junior Championship and the IIHF World U18 Championship, though it is afforded significantly less in terms of resources or promotion than either of the junior men's tournaments. Media coverage of the women's tournament is similarly lacking in comparison.

== List of championships ==
| Year | Gold | Silver | Bronze | 4th place | Host city |
|---|---|---|---|---|---|
| 2008 | United States | Canada | Czech Republic | Sweden | Calgary, Canada |
| 2009 | United States | Canada | Sweden | Czech Republic | Füssen, Germany |
| 2010 | Canada | United States | Sweden | Germany | Chicago, United States |
| 2011 | United States | Canada | Finland | Czech Republic | Stockholm, Sweden |
| 2012 | Canada | United States | Sweden | Germany | Zlín and Přerov, Czech Republic |
| 2013 | Canada | United States | Sweden | Czech Republic | Heinola and Vierumäki, Finland |
| 2014 | Canada | United States | Czech Republic | Russia | Budapest, Hungary |
| 2015 | United States | Canada | Russia | Czech Republic | Buffalo, United States |
| 2016 | United States | Canada | Sweden | Russia | St. Catharines, Canada |
| 2017 | United States | Canada | Russia | Sweden | Zlín and Přerov, Czech Republic |
| 2018 | United States | Sweden | Canada | Russia | Dmitrov, Russia |
| 2019 | Canada | United States | Finland | Russia | Obihiro, Japan |
| 2020 | United States | Canada | Russia | Finland | Bratislava, Slovakia |
| 2021 | Cancelled due to the COVID-19 pandemic | | | | |
| 2022 | Canada | United States | Finland | Sweden | Dane County, Wisconsin, United States |
| 2023 | Canada | Sweden | United States | Finland | Östersund, Sweden |
| 2024 | United States | Czechia | Canada | Finland | Zug, Switzerland |
| 2025 | Canada | United States | Czechia | Sweden | Vantaa, Finland |
| 2026 | United States | Canada | Czechia | Sweden | Membertou and Sydney, Nova Scotia, Canada |
| 2027 | | | | | Ostrava, Czech Republic |
| 2028 | | | | | (Canada) |
| 2029 | | | | | |
| 2030 | | | | | (Canada) |

== Participation and medals ==
| Nation | Years | First | Last | Gold | Silver | Bronze | Total | Best finish (first/last) |
|---|---|---|---|---|---|---|---|---|
| United States | 18 | 2008 | 2026 | 10 | 7 | 1 | 18 | 1st (2008/2026) |
| Canada | 18 | 2008 | 2026 | 8 | 8 | 2 | 18 | 1st (2010/2025) |
| Sweden | 18 | 2008 | 2026 | 0 | 2 | 5 | 7 | 2nd (2018/2023) |
| Czechia | 18 | 2008 | 2026 | 0 | 1 | 4 | 5 | 2nd (2024) |
| Finland | 18 | 2008 | 2026 | 0 | 0 | 3 | 3 | 3rd (2011/2022) |
| Russia | 12 | 2008 | 2020 | 0 | 0 | 3 | 3 | 3rd (2015/2020) |
| Germany | 9 | 2008 | 2024 | 0 | 0 | 0 | 0 | 4th (2010/2012) |
| Switzerland | 15 | 2008 | 2026 | 0 | 0 | 0 | 0 | 5th (2025/2026) |
| Japan | 8 | 2010 | 2025 | 0 | 0 | 0 | 0 | 6th (2010) |
| Slovakia | 6 | 2020 | 2026 | 0 | 0 | 0 | 0 | 6th (2022/2024) |
| Hungary | 3 | 2013 | 2026 | 0 | 0 | 0 | 0 | 6th (2013) |
| France | 1 | 2016 | 2016 | 0 | 0 | 0 | 0 | 8th (2016) |

== Medal table ==
| Rank | Nation | Gold | Silver | Bronze | Total |
|---|---|---|---|---|---|
| 1 | United States | 10 | 7 | 1 | 18 |
| 2 | Canada | 8 | 8 | 2 | 18 |
| 3 | Sweden | 0 | 2 | 5 | 7 |
| 4 | Czech Republic | 0 | 1 | 4 | 5 |
| 5 | Finland | 0 | 0 | 3 | 3 |
| 5 | Russia | 0 | 0 | 3 | 3 |
| Totals (6 entries) | | 18 | 18 | 18 | 54 |
