= 2008 IIHF World Women's U18 Championship =

Tournament details
- Host country: Canada
- Venues: 2 (in 1 host city)
- Dates: 7–12 January 2008
- Teams: 8

Final positions
- Champions: United States (1st title)
- Runners-up: Canada
- Third place: Czech Republic

Tournament statistics
- Games played: 20
- Goals scored: 168 (8.4 per game)
- Attendance: 9,872 (494 per game)
- Scoring leader: (Canada) Marie-Philip Poulin (14 points)

The 2008 IIHF World Women's U18 Championship was the inaugural junior female world ice hockey championship. It was held from 7 to 12 January 2008, in Calgary, Alberta, Canada. The championship is the junior ice hockey version of the women worlds, held under the auspices of the IIHF.

The inaugural competition featured two groups of nations in round robin play, followed by playoffs. There were eight national teams.

== Teams ==
The following teams participated in the championship:

- Canada
- Czech Republic
- Finland
- Germany
- Russia
- Switzerland
- Sweden
- United States

== Format ==
The eight participating teams are divided up into two seeded groups as below. The teams will play each other once in a single round robin format. The top two teams from the group will proceed to the medal round, while the remaining teams will play in the placing games.

== Preliminary round ==
All times are local (UTC–7).

=== Group A ===
Pos	Team	Pld	W	OTW	OTL	L	GF	GA	GD	Pts	Qualification
1	Canada (H)	3	3	0	0	0	38	3	+35	9	Semifinals
2	Czech Republic	3	2	0	0	1	10	16	−6	6	Semifinals
3	Germany	3	1	0	0	2	7	15	−8	3	5–8th place semifinals
4	Finland	3	0	0	0	3	5	26	−21	0	5–8th place semifinals

Source: IIHF
(H) Host

7 January 2008; 19:30	Finland	2–4 (1–1, 1–2, 0-1)	Germany	Norma Bush Arena, Calgary; Attendance: 102

Game reference
Referee: (Canada) Mary Anne Gage

7 January 2008; 19:45	Canada	11–2 (4–0, 4–1, 3–1)	Czech Republic	Father David Bauer Olympic Arena, Calgary; Attendance: 976

Game reference

Delayne Brian
Goalies
Kateřina Bečevová
Referee:
(France) Marie Picavet
Linesmen:
(Russia) Marina Konstantinova
(United States) Kelli O'Brian

Poulin (Dumais) – 7:00	1–0
Prevost (Watt, Dumais) – 9:00	2–0
Spooner (Bram, Watchorn) (PP) – 10:36	3–0
Spooner (PP) – 13:24	4–0
Prevost (Poulin) – 21:14	5–0
	5–1	22:39 – Tomigova (Mrázová)
White (Spooner) – 25:27	6–1
Spooner (Jenner) – 30:08	7–1
Poulin (PP) – 37:45	8–1
Dumais (Poulin, Haverstock) – 43:59	9–1
Poulin (Dumais, Prevost) – 55:01	10–1
	10–2	57:52 – Povavá (Polenská)
Jenner (Jones) – 58:18	11–2

12 min
Penalties
20 min
49
Shots
12

8 January 2008; 19:30	Finland	3–5 (2–2, 1–2, 0–1)	Czech Republic	Norma Bush Arena, Calgary; Attendance: 106

Game reference
Referee: (United Kingdom) Joy Tottman

8 January 2008; 19:45	Germany	1–10 (0–2, 1–4, 0–4)	Canada	Father David Bauer Olympic Arena, Calgary; Attendance: 1,024

Game reference
Referee: (Japan) Utsumi Mamiko

9 January 2008; 19:30	Czech Republic	3–2 (0–0, 1–0, 2–2)	Germany	Norma Bush Arena, Calgary; Attendance: 121

Game reference
Referee: (Finland) Anu Hirvonen

9 January 2008; 19:45	Canada	17–0 (6–0, 8–0, 3–0)	Finland	Father David Bauer Olympic Arena, Calgary; Attendance: 1,052

Game reference
Referee: (United States) Danyel Howard

=== Group B ===
Pos	Team	Pld	W	OTW	OTL	L	GF	GA	GD	Pts	Qualification
1	United States	3	3	0	0	0	28	2	+26	9	Semifinals
2	Sweden	3	2	0	0	1	20	7	+13	6	Semifinals
3	Switzerland	3	1	0	0	2	7	17	−10	3	5–8th place semifinals
4	Russia	3	0	0	0	3	2	31	−29	0	5–8th place semifinals

Source: IIHF

7 January 2008; 16:00	Sweden	4–1 (3–0, 1–0, 0–1)	Switzerland	Norma Bush Arena, Calgary; Attendance: 98

Game reference
Referee: (Japan) Utsumi Mamiko

7 January 2008; 16:15	United States	11–0 (3–0, 4–0, 4–0)	Russia	Father David Bauer Olympic Arena, Calgary; Attendance: 452

Game reference
Referee: (Finland) Anu Hirvonen

8 January 2008; 16:00	Sweden	14–0 (4–0, 5–0, 5–0)	Russia	Norma Bush Arena, Calgary; Attendance: 52

Game reference
Referee: (United States) Danyel Howard

8 January 2008; 16:15	Switzerland	0–11 (0–5, 0–1, 0–5)	United States	Father David Bauer Olympic Arena, Calgary; Attendance: 401

Game reference
Referee: (Czech Republic) Kateřina Ivičičová

9 January 2008; 16:00	Russia	2–6 (0–1, 1–3, 1–2)	Switzerland	Norma Bush Arena, Calgary; Attendance: 57

Game reference
Referee: (France) Marie Picavet

9 January 2008; 16:15	United States	6–2 (1–1, 2–1, 3–0)	Sweden	Father David Bauer Olympic Arena, Calgary; Attendance: 397

Game reference
Referee: (Canada) Mary Anne Gage

== Placement round ==
=== Bracket ===
5–8th place semifinals
A3	Germany	2
B4	Russia	1
B3	Switzerland	2
A4	Finland	7

5th place
A3	Germany	4
A4	Finland	1
7th place
B3	Switzerland	4
B4	Russia	1

=== 5–8th place semifinals ===
11 January 2008; 16:00	Germany	2–1 (0–1, 2–0, 0–0)	Russia	Norma Bush Arena, Calgary; Attendance: 64

Game reference
Referee: (Japan) Utsumi Mamiko

11 January 2008; 19:30	Switzerland	2–7 (1–2, 0–3, 1–2)	Finland	Norma Bush Arena, Calgary; Attendance: 61

Game reference
Referee: (Czech Republic) Kateřina Ivičičová

=== 7th place game ===
12 January 2008; 9:30	Switzerland	4–1 (1–1, 2–0, 1–0)	Russia	Norma Bush Arena, Calgary; Attendance: 54

Game reference
Referee: (Finland) Anu Hirvonen

=== 5th place game ===
12 January 2008; 13:30	Germany	4–1 (3–0, 0–1, 1–0)	Finland	Norma Bush Arena, Calgary; Attendance: 76

Game reference
Referee: (United States) Danyel Howard

== Final round ==
=== Bracket ===
Semifinals
A1	Canada	7
B2	Sweden	1
B1	United States	8
A2	Czech Republic	0

Finals
A1	Canada	2
B1	United States	5
Third place
B2	Sweden	2
A2	Czech Republic	4

=== Semifinals ===
11 January 2008; 16:15	United States	8–0 (2–0, 4–0, 2–0)	Czech Republic	Father David Bauer Olympic Arena, Calgary; Attendance: 483

Game reference
Referee: (France) Marie Picavet

11 January 2008; 19:45	Canada	7–1 (2–0, 4–0, 1–1)	Sweden	Father David Bauer Olympic Arena, Calgary; Attendance: 1,628

Game reference
Referee: (United Kingdom) Joy Tottman

=== Bronze medal game ===
12 January 2008; 16:00	Sweden	2–4 (0–0, 0–1, 2–3)	Czech Republic	Father David Bauer Olympic Arena, Calgary; Attendance: 512

Game reference

Hanna Emanuelsson
Valentina Lizana
Goalies
Kateřina Bečevová
Referee:
(Canada) Mary Anne Gage
Linesmen:
(United States) Kelli O'Brian
(Canada) Kerri Rumble

	0–1	25:26 – Polenská (Povová, Dvořáková) (PP)
Myrén (Östberg, Holmbom) (SH) – 42:05	1–1
Jordansson (Enström) – 47:54	2–1
	2–2	49:38 – Manhartová (Tomigová, Horáková)
	2–3	56:47 – Manhartová (Tomigová)
	2–4	59:44 – Polenská (PP, ENG)

12 min
Penalties
12 min
23
Shots
23

=== Gold medal game ===
12 January 2008; 19:30	Canada	2–5 (0–2, 1–2, 1–1)	United States	Father David Bauer Olympic Arena, Calgary; Attendance: 2,156

Game reference

Delayne Brian
Goalies
Alyssa Grogan
Referee:
(United Kingdom) Joy Tottman
Linesmen:
(Russia) Marina Konstantinova
(United Kingdom) Alice Stanley

	0–1	12:12 – Mangene (Ammerman)
	0–2	18:48 – Ammerman (Decker)
	0–3	22:29 – Coyne (Erickson)
	0–4	28:14 – Decker
Prevost (Rougeau) (PP) – 38:17	1–4
Jones (Prevost) – 42:20	2–4
	2–5	52:16 – Kessel (PP)

12 min
Penalties
10 min
28
Shots
27

== Ranking and statistics ==
=== Final ranking ===
Pos	Grp	Team	Pld	W	OTW	OTL	L	GF	GA	GD	Pts	Final result
1	B	United States	5	5	0	0	0	41	4	+37	15	Champions
2	A	Canada (H)	5	4	0	0	1	47	9	+38	12	Runners-up
3	A	Czech Republic	5	3	0	0	2	14	26	−12	9	Third place
4	B	Sweden	5	2	0	0	3	23	18	+5	6	Fourth place
5	A	Germany	5	3	0	0	2	13	17	−4	9	Fifth place game
6	A	Finland	5	1	0	0	4	13	32	−19	3	Fifth place game
7	B	Switzerland	5	2	0	0	3	13	25	−12	6	Seventh place game
8	B	Russia	5	0	0	0	5	4	37	−33	0	Seventh place game

Source: https://stats.iihf.com/Hydra/156/
(H) Host

=== Scoring leaders ===
List shows the top skaters sorted by points, then goals. If the list exceeds 10 skaters because of a tie in points, all of the tied skaters are shown.

Player	GP	G	A	Pts	+/−	PIM	POS
(Canada) Marie-Philip Poulin	5	8	6	14	+15	4	FW
(Canada) Camille Dumais	5	5	9	14	+8	0	FW
(United States) Amanda Kessel	5	4	7	11	+10	2	FW
(Canada) Natalie Spooner	5	3	8	11	+8	0	FW
(United States) Brooke Ammerman	5	6	4	10	+8	4	FW
(United States) Ashley Cottrell	5	5	5	10	+10	0	FW
(Canada) Tara Watchorn	5	4	6	10	+9	0	DF
(Canada) Brianne Jenner	5	6	3	9	+7	2	FW
(Czech Republic) Alena Polenská	5	6	3	9	−2	0	FW
(Canada) Carolyne Prevost	5	6	3	9	+8	0	FW

Source: IIHF

=== Leading goaltenders ===
Only the top five goaltenders, based on save percentage, who have played 40% of their team's minutes are included in this list.

Player	TOI	SA	GA	GAA	Sv%	SO
(United States) Alyssa Grogan	240:17	53	4	1.00	92.98	1
(Switzerland) Sophie Anthamatten	299:30	218	24	4.81	90.08	0
(Sweden) Valentina Lizana	180:15	72	8	2.66	90.00	1
(Germany) Julia Zorn	275:31	100	12	2.61	89.29	0
(Canada) Delayne Brian	210:05	53	8	2.28	86.89	0

Source: IIHF

=== Tournament awards ===
Best players selected by the directorate:

- Best Goaltender: (United States) Alyssa Grogan
- Best Defenceman: (Canada) Lauriane Rougeau
- Best Forward: (Canada) Marie-Philip Poulin

== See also ==
- 2007 IIHF World Women's U18 Championship Qualification
- 2008 IIHF World U18 Championships (Men)
- 2008 World Junior Ice Hockey Championships (Men)
