= Bike Calgary =

Non-profit organisation based in Alberta, Canada

- Company type: Nonprofit
- Industry: Cycling
- Founded: 2008; Calgary, Alberta
- Headquarters: CommunityWise Resource Centre, Calgary, Alberta, Canada
- Area served: Calgary
- Website: Bike Calgary

Bike Calgary is a member-based, non-profit organization based in Calgary, Alberta, Canada. With over 1,300 active members, it is the city’s largest advocacy group for utility cycling and active transportation.

== History ==
Bike Calgary was formed as an informal group of cyclists in 2005 and at first existed mainly as a website that served to disseminate information on cycling in Calgary, and incorporated as a non-profit society in 2008. In 2011, under the guidance of CivicCamp, Bike Calgary began to take on a broader advocacy role.

== Initiatives ==
Bike Calgary lobbied Calgary Transit to allow folding bicycles on buses and trains at all times, which it now does. It has also been involved in the implementation of Calgary's Cycling Strategy. In 2014, it led a successful campaign to implement a pilot network of protected bike lanes in Downtown Calgary and the Beltline.

== Cycling courses ==
Bike Calgary has developed and offers a one-day Urban Cycling Skills course for a nominal fee. It is based on the CAN-BIKE curriculum.

== Annual YYC Bike Awards ==
- The Lawrence Hong Advocacy Award
- Commuter of the Year
- Business of the Year
- School of the Year

== See also ==
- Transportation in Calgary
