= Circle K Classic =

Ice hockey tournament in Calgary, Alberta, Canada

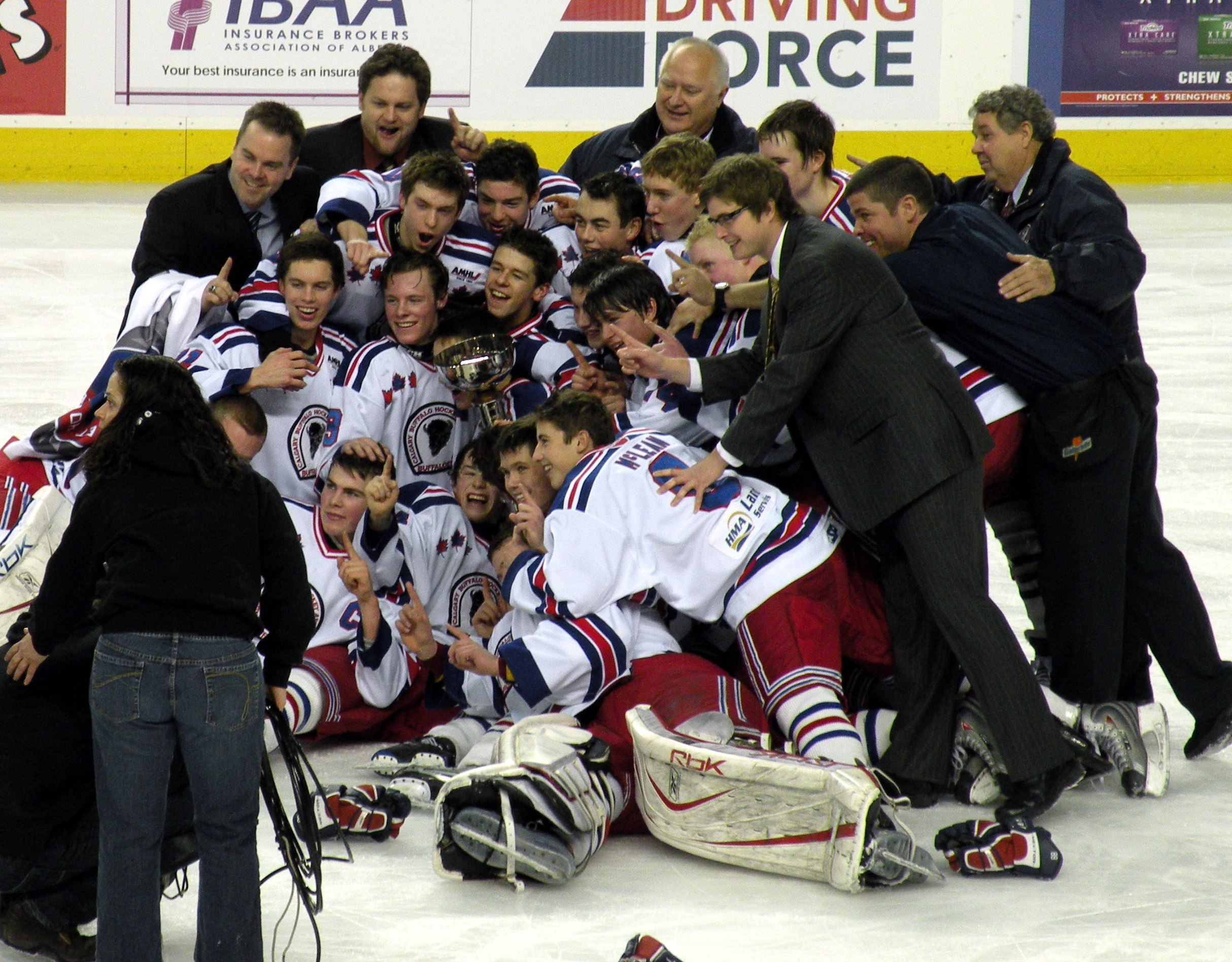
The Calgary Buffaloes celebrate after winning the 2008 championship.

The Circle K Classic (formerly Mac's Tournament and CP Challenge Cup) is an international ice hockey tournament held annually for U18 players in Calgary, Alberta, Canada. First held in 1978, the tournament features 25 male teams from across Canada, the United States and Europe.

The Circle K Classic Tournament begins on December 27 and concludes with the championship game on January 1 (New Year's Day). The round robin games are seen by around 3,000 fans, per game, at two local arenas in Calgary. They are the Max Bell Centre, and the 7 Chiefs Sportsplex at the Tsuu T'ina Nation. The main championship game was held at the Scotiabank Saddledome, where it was seen by as many as 10,000 spectators. Overall, the tournament draws in as many as 70,000 spectators over the six days.

Many of the male players here would have played at their highest point of their ice hockey careers. However, some of them went on to play in the National Hockey League. These players are recognized by the Circle K Classic tournament officials by having their photos added to the Wall of Fame at the Max Bell Centre.

On January 2, 1989, Petr Nedvěd, who was playing for the champion Chemical Works Litvínov team, left his hotel room in the middle of the night and walked into a Calgary RCMP police station. Once there, he declared his intention to defect from his native country of Czechoslovakia.

== Tournament format ==
The current Circle K Classic tournament starts with eight pools of four male teams each. Each pool is "hosted" by a Calgary area team: the Calgary Flames (AAA), the Calgary Royals, the Calgary Northstars and the Calgary Buffaloes. They all play their ice hockey games in the Alberta Midget Hockey League. All male teams face each other in their respective round robin pools (from December 27 to 29). The pool winners and runners-up advance to the 'A' division main championship group. The third place teams in each pool play for the 'B' championship and the fourth place teams in each pool play for the 'C' title. All of the divisional semi-finals take place on December 31 (New Year's Eve). From there, the remaining two teams left would play in the championship game on January 1, in order to determine the winner of the tournament.

In the former female division, there were three pools of five teams each. The main female hosts here were the Calgary Fire and the Rocky Mountain Raiders from Okotoks. The top five pool winners each and one wild-card spot advanced to the semifinals. From there, the two remaining female teams went on to play at the championship game, in order to determine the winner of the tournament.

== Champions ==
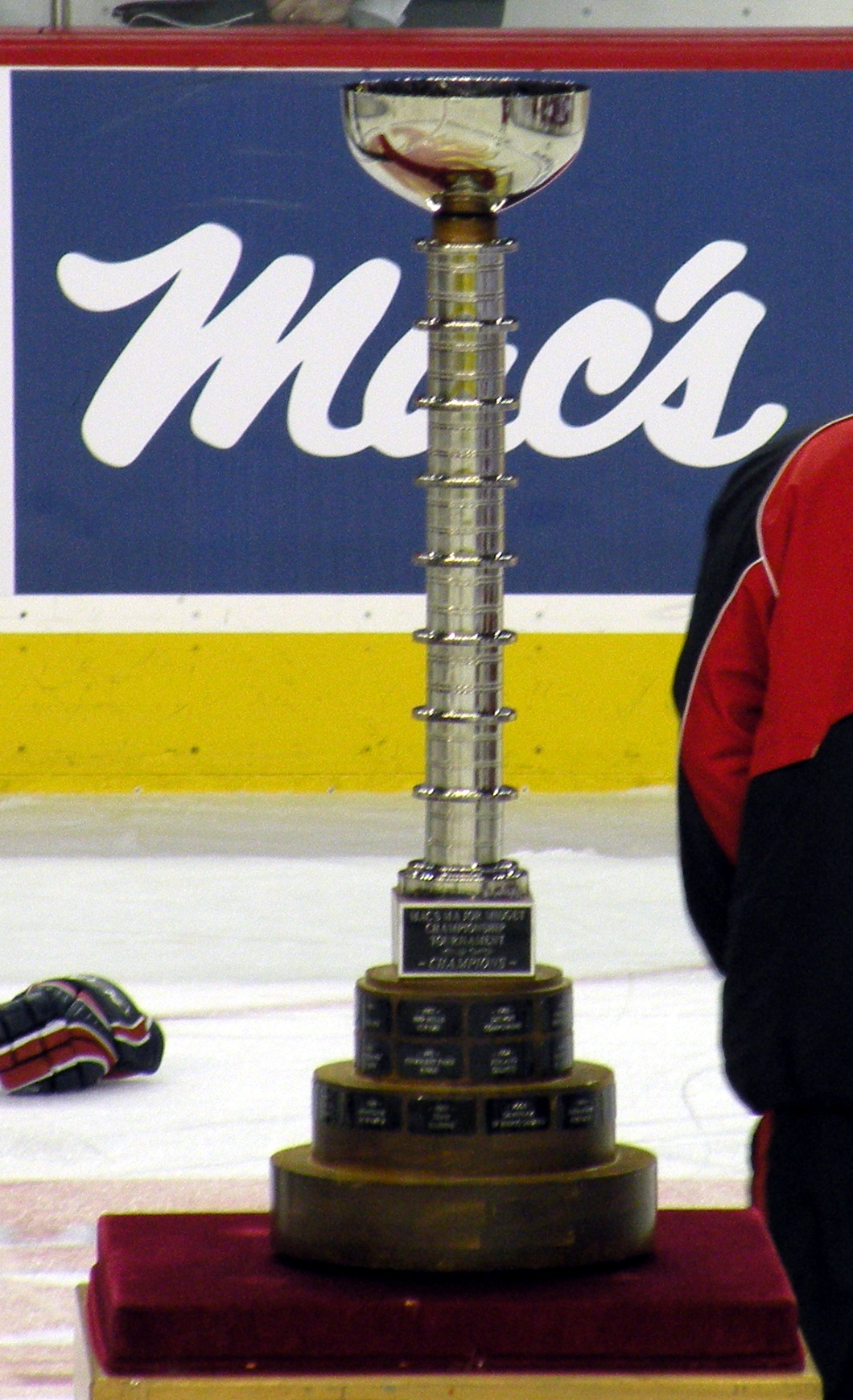
The Circle K Classic championship trophy

- Note: Numbers in brackets indicated teams that have won more than one Midget AAA World Invitational Tournament championship in their history.

=== Male division ===
- 2025: St. Louis AAA Blues
- 2024: Shattuck-Saint Mary's (6)
- 2023: Shattuck-Saint Mary's (5)
- 2022 (Dec) : South Alberta Hockey Academy (2)
- 2022 (April) : South Alberta Hockey Academy
- 2021: Cancelled, due to COVID-19
- 2020: Cancelled, due to COVID-19
- 2019: Calgary Buffaloes (4)
- 2018: St. Albert Raiders
- 2017: Regina Pat Canadians
- 2016: Belarus National U17
- 2015: Calgary Flames (Midget AAA) (3)
- 2014: Cariboo Cougars
- 2013: Finland U17
- 2012: Vancouver NW Giants (2)
- 2011: Russia Severstal/Locomotiv (2)
- 2010: Edmonton SSAC BP Athletics
- 2009: Vancouver NW Giants (1)
- 2008: Calgary Buffaloes (3)
- 2007: Russia Severstal (1)
- 2006: Notre Dame Hounds (2)
- 2005: Team Sweden
- 2004: Saskatoon Contacts (2)
- 2003: Shattuck-Saint Mary's (4)
- 2002: Team Illinois
- 2001: Shattuck-Saint Mary's (3)
- 2000: Shattuck-Saint Mary's (2)
- 1999: Shattuck-Saint Mary's (1)
- 1998: UFA Bisons
- 1997: Saskatoon Contacts (1)
- 1996: Calgary Flames (Midget AAA) (2)
- 1995: North Battleford North Stars
- 1994: Calgary Royals
- 1993: Calgary Flames (Midget AAA) (1)
- 1992: Finland Candidates
- 1991: Sherwood Park Kings
- 1990: Lethbridge Y's Men Thunder
- 1989: Poldi Kladno, Czechoslovakia
- 1988: Litvínov, Czechoslovakia
- 1987: Calgary North Stars
- 1986: Calgary Buffaloes (2)
- 1985: Detroit Little Caesars
- 1984: Calgary Buffaloes (1)
- 1983: Detroit Compuware
- 1982: Don Mills Flyers
- 1981: Éclaireurs du Richelieu
- 1980: Notre Dame Hounds (1)
- 1979: North York Flames
- 1978: Red Deer Optimist Chiefs

=== Female division ===
The female division was introduced in 2004. Due to declining registration, the 2017 tournament was the final one that took place.

- 2017: Rocky Mountain Raiders (2)
- 2016: Rocky Mountain Raiders (1)
- 2015: Northern Capitals
- 2014: Saskatoon Stars (2)
- 2013: Westman Wildcats
- 2012: Edmonton Thunder
- 2011: Regina Rebels
- 2010: Saskatoon Stars (1)
- 2009: St. Albert Slash
- 2008: Swift Current Wildcats (2)
- 2007: Swift Current Wildcats (1)
- 2006: Notre Dame Hounds (3)
- 2005: Notre Dame Hounds (2)
- 2004: Notre Dame Hounds (1)

== Alumni in the NHL ==
The following is a partial list of Circle K Classic tourney alumni who have gone on to play in the NHL.

- Craig Adams
- Mikael Backlund
- Bob Bassen
- Ryan Bayda
- Wade Belak
- Marc-Andre Bergeron
- Jay Bouwmeester
- Rod Brind'Amour
- Sheldon Brookbank
- Curtis Brown
- Jimmy Carson
- Wendel Clark
- Shayne Corson
- Sidney Crosby
- Doug Dadswell
- Jeff Daniels
- Gerald Diduck
- Kris Draper
- Jordan Eberle
- Pat Elynuik
- Andrew Ference
- Simon Gagne
- Scott Gomez
- Kevin Hatcher
- Dany Heatley
- Cale Hulse
- Jarome Iginla
- Mike Keane
- Alex Kerfoot
- Sheldon Kennedy
- Gord Kluzak
- John Kordic
- Nick Kypreos
- Mark Lamb
- Claude Lemieux
- Curtis Leschyshyn
- Trevor Linden
- Dean McAmmond
- Kirk McLean
- Jamie McLennan
- Scott Mellanby
- Mike Modano
- Dana Murzyn
- Tyson Nash
- Petr Nedved
- Scott Nichol
- Janne Niinimaa
- Ryan Nugent-Hopkins
- Lyle Odelein
- Jeff Odgers
- Chris Osgood
- Zach Parise
- James Patrick
- Jamie Pushor
- Bill Ranford
- Mike Rathje
- Griffin Reinhart
- Sam Reinhart
- Steven Reinprecht
- Cliff Ronning
- Martin Ručinský
- Cory Sarich
- Jeff Shantz
- Todd Simpson
- Colton Sissons
- Brian Skrudland
- Jason Smith
- Bryan Smolinski
- Ryan Smyth
- Jarret Stoll
- Mark Tinordi
- Rick Tocchet
- Tony Twist
- Mike Vernon
- Wes Walz
- Rhett Warrener
- Jordan Weal
- Clarke Wilm
- Brendan Witt
- Peter Zezel

== See also ==
- Telus Cup
- Esso Cup
