= Drumheller Falcons =

- City: Drumheller, Alberta
- League: Alberta Junior Hockey League
- Division: South

Franchise history
- 1967-1970: Ponoka Stampeders
- 1971-1983: Drumheller Falcons

The Drumheller Falcons were a Junior A ice hockey team in the Alberta Junior Hockey League (AJHL) based in Drumheller, Alberta.

The Falcons joined the AJHL in the 1971–72 season as the league's seventh team after acquiring the assets of the Ponoka Stampeders franchise that ceased operations after the 1969–70 season.

The Falcons had their best season in 1974-75. They finished second overall during the regular season, advanced through the post season to the AJHL finals, going the full seven games before losing the championship to the Spruce Grove Mets, who would go on to win that year's Centennial Cup as the best Junior A hockey team in Canada, with no other challenger good enough to take them to a full 7-game series.

The Falcons would struggle with attendance the following season, then took a three-year leave of absence.

The Falcons returned in 1979, however were consistently overmatched, winning just 29 games total between 1979 and 1983. The Falcons folded midway through the 1982-83 season having lost every game they played that year. The Falcons still hold the record for longest losing streak spanning two seasons at 35; a record stopped only by the team's demise.

Four Falcons alumni went on to play in the National Hockey League: Merlin Malinowski, Jim Nill, Bryan Maxwell and John Hilworth.

Drumheller would not get a second chance in the AJHL until 2003, when the Drumheller Dragons were founded as an expansion team.

== Season-by-season record ==
Note: GP = Games played, W = Wins, L = Losses, T = Ties, Pts = Points, GF = Goals for, GA = Goals against

Season	GP	W	L	T	GF	GA	Points	Finish	Playoffs
1971-72	48	16	32	0	190	319	32	7th overall	Out of playoffs
1972-73	60	29	29	2	331	350	58	3rd overall	
1973-74	60	21	36	3	232	309	45	5th overall	
1974-75	60	42	17	1	342	260	85	2nd overall	Lost final
1975-76	60	19	40	1	289	425	39	5th overall	
1976–77	leave of absence								
1977–78	leave of absence								
1978–79	leave of absence								
1979-80	59	9	49	1	185	399	19	8th overall	Out of playoffs
1980-81	60	10	50	0	227	415	20	4th South	Out of playoffs
1981-82	60	10	50	0	230	427	20	5th South	Out of playoffs
1982-83^{†}	26	0	26	0	64	223	0	5th South	Out of playoffs

^{†}Folded with a record of 0-24-0. The team forfeited two games following its demise.

=== Playoffs ===
- 1972 DNQ
- 1973 Lost semi-final

Calgary Canucks defeated Drumheller Falcons 4-games-to-1 with 1 tie

- 1974 DNQ
- 1975 Lost final

Drumheller Falcons defeated Taber Golden Suns 4-games-to-1
Spruce Grove Mets defeated Drumheller Falcons 4-games-to-3

- 1976 DNQ
- 1977-79 Did Not Participate
- 1980 DNQ
- 1981 Lost quarter-final

Calgary Spurs defeated Drumheller Falcons 3-games-to-none

- 1982 DNQ
- 1983 Did Not Finish Season

== See also ==
- List of ice hockey teams in Alberta
