= Earl Ingarfield =

Earl Ingarfield may refer to:

- Earl Ingarfield Sr. (born 1934), Canadian NHL player 1958–1971
- Earl Ingarfield Jr. (born 1959), American NHL player 1979–1981
