= Dave Marcinyshyn =

Canadian ice hockey player (born 1967)

- Born: February 4, 1967 (age 59) Edmonton, Alberta, Canada
- Height: 6 ft 3 in (191 cm)
- Weight: 210 lb (95 kg; 15 st 0 lb)
- Position: Defence
- Shot: Left
- Played for: New Jersey Devils; Quebec Nordiques; New York Rangers
- NHL draft: Undrafted
- Playing career: 1987–1999

David Joseph Marcinyshyn (born February 4, 1967) is a Canadian retired professional ice hockey defenceman.

== Early life ==
Marcinyshyn was born in Edmonton, Alberta. He played junior hockey with the Fort Saskatchewan Traders and Kamloops Blazers.

== Career ==
Undrafted in the NHL entry draft, Marcinyshyn signed with the New Jersey Devils in 1987 and made his NHL debut for the Devils during the 1990–91 NHL season playing nine games in total and spent four seasons with the American Hockey League's Utica Devils. In 1991, he was traded to the Quebec Nordiques for Brent Severyn and played five games for the team. He moved to the New York Rangers in 1992 and managed just two games for them. In total, Marcinyshyn played 16 regular season games, scoring one assist and collected 49 penalty minutes. He spent four seasons in the International Hockey League before moving to the Deutsche Eishockey Liga in Germany in two seasons before retiring in 1999.

== Career statistics ==
=== Regular season and playoffs ===
| | | | Regular season | | | | | Playoffs |
| Season | Team | League | GP | G | A | Pts | PIM | GP | G | A | Pts | PIM |
|---|---|---|---|---|---|---|---|---|---|---|---|---|
| 1984–85 | Fort Saskatchewan Traders | AJHL | 55 | 11 | 41 | 52 | 311 | — | — | — | — | — |
| 1985–86 | Kamloops Blazers | WHL | 57 | 2 | 7 | 9 | 111 | 16 | 1 | 3 | 4 | 12 |
| 1986–87 | Kamloops Blazers | WHL | 68 | 5 | 27 | 32 | 106 | 13 | 0 | 3 | 3 | 35 |
| 1987–88 | Utica Devils | AHL | 73 | 2 | 7 | 9 | 179 | — | — | — | — | — |
| 1987–88 | Flint Spirits | IHL | 3 | 0 | 0 | 0 | 4 | 16 | 0 | 2 | 2 | 31 |
| 1988–89 | Utica Devils | AHL | 74 | 4 | 14 | 18 | 101 | 5 | 0 | 0 | 0 | 13 |
| 1989–90 | Utica Devils | AHL | 74 | 6 | 18 | 24 | 164 | 5 | 0 | 2 | 2 | 21 |
| 1990–91 | New Jersey Devils | NHL | 9 | 0 | 1 | 1 | 21 | — | — | — | — | — |
| 1990–91 | Utica Devils | AHL | 52 | 4 | 9 | 13 | 81 | — | — | — | — | — |
| 1991–92 | Quebec Nordiques | NHL | 5 | 0 | 0 | 0 | 26 | — | — | — | — | — |
| 1991–92 | Halifax Citadels | AHL | 74 | 10 | 42 | 52 | 138 | — | — | — | — | — |
| 1992–93 | New York Rangers | NHL | 2 | 0 | 0 | 0 | 2 | — | — | — | — | — |
| 1992–93 | Binghamton Rangers | AHL | 67 | 5 | 25 | 30 | 184 | 6 | 0 | 3 | 3 | 14 |
| 1993–94 | Milwaukee Admirals | IHL | 1 | 0 | 0 | 0 | 0 | — | — | — | — | — |
| 1994–95 | Milwaukee Admirals | IHL | 63 | 2 | 14 | 16 | 176 | — | — | — | — | — |
| 1994–95 | Kalamazoo Wings | IHL | 3 | 0 | 0 | 0 | 6 | 16 | 0 | 1 | 1 | 16 |
| 1995–96 | Cincinnati Cyclones | IHL | 65 | 6 | 16 | 22 | 99 | 17 | 0 | 2 | 2 | 10 |
| 1996–97 | Cincinnati Cyclones | IHL | 74 | 1 | 9 | 10 | 141 | — | — | — | — | — |
| 1997–98 | Düsseldorfer EG | DEL | 47 | 6 | 16 | 22 | 99 | 3 | 0 | 0 | 0 | 4 |
| 1998–99 | SERC Wild Wings | DEL | 43 | 5 | 9 | 14 | 101 | — | — | — | — | — |
| 2003–04 | Stony Plain Eagles | Chinook HL | 6 | 2 | 5 | 7 | 0 | — | — | — | — | — |
| 2004–05 | Stony Plain Eagles | Chinook HL | 10 | 2 | 2 | 4 | 13 | — | — | — | — | — |
| NHL totals | | | 16 | 0 | 1 | 1 | 49 | — | — | — | — | — |
| AHL totals | | | 414 | 31 | 115 | 146 | 847 | 16 | 0 | 5 | 5 | 48 |
| IHL totals | | | 209 | 9 | 39 | 48 | 426 | 49 | 0 | 5 | 5 | 57 |
