= Randy Turnbull =

Canadian ice hockey player

- Born: February 17, 1962 (age 64) Red Deer, Alberta, Canada
- Height: 6 ft 0 in (183 cm)
- Weight: 185 lb (84 kg; 13 st 3 lb)
- Position: Defence
- Shot: Right
- Played for: Calgary Flames
- NHL draft: 97th overall, 1980; Calgary Flames
- Playing career: 1981–1988

Randy Layne Turnbull (born February 7, 1962) is a Canadian former professional ice hockey defenceman. He played one game in the National Hockey League with the Calgary Flames during the 1981–82 season. The rest of his career, which lasted from 1981 to 1988, was spent in the minor leagues. He was primarily known as a tough guy. In his role as an enforcer, he was a feared role player in the juniors and minor leagues.

Born in Red Deer, Alberta, Turnbull played major junior hockey for the Portland Winter Hawks. He was drafted in the fifth round (97th overall) by the Calgary Flames of the 1980 NHL entry draft.

== Career statistics ==
=== Regular season and playoffs ===
			Regular season					Playoffs
Season	Team	League	GP	G	A	Pts	PIM	GP	G	A	Pts	PIM
1977–78	Fort Saskatchewan Traders	AJHL	47	1	3	4	172	—	—	—	—	—
1978–79	Fort Saskatchewan Traders	AJHL	51	4	30	34	367	4	0	0	0	2
1978–79	Portland Winter Hawks	WHL	1	0	0	0	7	4	0	0	0	2
1979–80	Portland Winter Hawks	WHL	72	4	25	29	355	8	0	1	1	50
1980–81	Portland Winter Hawks	WHL	56	1	31	32	295	8	0	1	1	86
1981–82	Portland Winter Hawks	WHL	69	5	19	24	430	15	1	9	10	100
1981–82	Calgary Flames	NHL	1	0	0	0	2	—	—	—	—	—
1982–83	Colorado Flames	CHL	62	2	1	3	292	6	0	1	1	7
1983–84	Peoria Prancers	IHL	73	3	18	21	213	—	—	—	—	—
1983–84	New Haven Nighthawks	AHL	8	0	0	0	46	—	—	—	—	—
1984–85	Salt Lake Golden Eagles	IHL	81	10	14	24	282	7	0	0	0	41
1985–86	Salt Lake Golden Eagles	IHL	77	6	14	20	236	5	0	1	1	15
1986–87	Salt Lake Golden Eagles	IHL	60	2	6	8	212	10	0	0	0	56
1987–88	Flint Spirits	IHL	1	0	0	0	2	—	—	—	—	—
IHL totals			292	21	52	73	945	22	0	1	1	112
NHL totals			1	0	0	0	2	—	—	—	—	—

== See also ==
- List of players who played only one game in the NHL
