= 1975 Centennial Cup =

Ice hockey National Championship

1975 Manitoba Centennial Cup
Tournament details
- Venue: Edmonton, Alberta
- Dates: May 1975
- Teams: 2

Final positions
- Champions: Spruce Grove Mets (1st title)
- Runners-up: Guelph Biltmore Mad Hatters

Tournament statistics
- Games played: 6
- Scoring leader: Ron Lecuyer (Spruce Grove)

Awards
- MVP: Ron Lecuyer (Spruce Grove)

The 1975 Centennial Cup is the fifth Tier II Junior "A" 1975 ice hockey National Championship for the Canadian Junior A Hockey League.

The Centennial Cup was competed for by the winners of the Western Canadian Champions and the Eastern Canadian Champions.

The finals were hosted by the Spruce Grove Mets in the city of Edmonton, Alberta, Canada.

== The Playoffs ==
Regionals
Sask	Swift Current Broncos	0
Man	Selkirk Steelers	4
Western Canada
BC	Bellingham Blazers	2
Alta	Spruce Grove Mets	4
Ont	Guelph BMH's	4
TB	Thunder Bay Eagles	1
Eastern Canada
Ont	Smiths Falls Bears	4
PQ	St. Jerome Alouettes	1

Semi-finals
Sask	Selkirk Steelers	4
Alta	Spruce Grove Mets	2
Ont	Smiths Falls Bears	2
Ont	Guelph BMH's	4

Finals
Ont	Guelph BMH's	2
Alta	Spruce Grove Mets	4

Prior to the Regionals

Bellingham Blazers (BCJHL) defeated Coquitlam Comets (PCJHL) 2-games-to-none
Guelph Biltmore Mad Hatters (SOJHL) defeated Toronto Nationals (OPJHL) 4-games-to-2
Smiths Falls Bears (CJHL) defeated Gander Flyers (NLJHL) 4-games-to-none
Gander Flyers (NLJHL) defeated Charlottetown Islanders (IJHL) 3-games-to-none

=== MCC Finals ===
Centennial Cup Results
Game	Team	Score	Team	Score
1	Spruce Grove Mets	3	Guelph Biltmore Mad Hatters	4
2	Spruce Grove Mets	2	Guelph Biltmore Mad Hatters	3
3	Spruce Grove Mets	4	Guelph Biltmore Mad Hatters	1
4	Spruce Grove Mets	5	Guelph Biltmore Mad Hatters	2
5	Spruce Grove Mets	6	Guelph Biltmore Mad Hatters	3
6	Spruce Grove Mets	6	Guelph Biltmore Mad Hatters	4

== Regional Championships ==
Manitoba Centennial Cup: Spruce Grove Mets

Abbott Cup: Spruce Grove Mets
Eastern Champions: Guelph Biltmore Mad Hatters

Doyle Cup: Spruce Grove Mets
Anavet Cup: Selkirk Steelers
Dudley Hewitt Cup: Guelph Biltmore Mad Hatters
Callaghan Cup: Smiths Falls Bears

== Roll of League Champions ==
AJHL: Spruce Grove Mets
BCJHL: Bellingham Blazers
CJHL: Smiths Falls Bears
IJHL: Charlottetown Colonels
MJHL: Selkirk Steelers
NBJHL:
NJAHL: Gander Jr. Flyers
OPJHL: Toronto Nationals
PacJHL: Coquitlam Comets
QJAHL: St. Jerome Alouettes
SJHL: Swift Current Broncos
SOJAHL: Guelph Biltmore Mad Hatters
TBJHL: Thunder Bay Eagles

== Awards ==
Most Valuable Player: Ron Lecuyer (Spruce Grove Mets)
Top Scorer: Ron Lecuyer (Spruce Grove Mets)

=== All-Star Team ===
Forward

Paul Messier (Spruce Grove Mets)
Ron Lecuyer (Spruce Grove Mets)
Wally Hogg (Guelph Biltmore Mad Hatters)

Defence

Tom Rieck (Guelph Biltmore Mad Hatters)
Jeff Elkow (Spruce Grove Mets)

Goal

Julian Baretta (Spruce Grove Mets)

== See also ==
- Canadian Junior A Hockey League
- Royal Bank Cup
- Anavet Cup
- Doyle Cup
- Dudley Hewitt Cup
- Fred Page Cup
- Abbott Cup
- Mowat Cup
