= St. Albert Saints =

Canadian junior ice hockey team (1977–2004)

- City: St. Albert, Alberta
- League: AJHL
- Operated: 1977–2004
- Home arena: Akinsdale Arena
- Colours: Red; Gold

Franchise history
- 1963–1972: Edmonton Western Movers
- 1972–1974: Edmonton Mets
- 1974–1977: Spruce Grove Mets
- 1977–2004: St. Albert Saints
- 2004–2023: Spruce Grove Saints

Championships
- League: 1967; 1968; 1975; 1976; 1981; 1982; 1996; 1998
- Regional: 1975; 1976; 1981; 1982
- National: 1975

The St. Albert Saints were a junior ice hockey franchise based in St. Albert, Alberta, Canada, for twenty-seven seasons from 1977 to 2004. Before 1977, the team played in nearby Spruce Grove as the Spruce Grove Mets, and in 2004 the team again moved to Spruce Grove where they now play as the Spruce Grove Saints. In all its incarnations, the team has been a part of the junior 'A' Alberta Junior Hockey League.

== History ==
The Saints began life as the Edmonton Western Movers, named for the team's sponsor, as one of the original franchises of the AJHL in 1963. Nine years later, the Movers merged with their cross-town rivals the Edmonton Maple Leafs (which took its name from the Toronto NHL club) to become the Edmonton Mets as of the 1972–73 season.

Edmonton Western Movers statistics
Season	GP	W	L	T	GF	GA	Pts	Finish	Playoffs
1966–67	32	25	3	4	228	118	54	1st place	Won final against Lethbridge (4:1)
1967–68	40	21	16	3	185	157	45	2nd place	Won final
1968–69	50	28	16	6	213	197	62	3rd place	
1969–70	50	19	27	4	160	227	42	5th place	
1970–71	50	9	36	5	165	282	23	6th place	Lost semifinal against Lethbridge (4:0)
1971–72	48	16	29	3	192	231	35	5th place	Lost semifinal against Calgary (4:3)

Source: "Edmonton Western Movers statistics and history". hockeydb.com.

=== Spruce Grove Mets ===
The team moved to Spruce Grove, a suburb of Edmonton, to become the Spruce Grove Mets, starting with the 1974–75 season. The team moved to another Edmonton suburb, St. Albert, starting with the 1977–78 season, where they became the St. Albert Saints.

Before its arrival in St. Albert, the franchise's history included four AJHL championships, winning two Carling O'Keefe Cups as the Movers in 1967 and 1968 and adding another two consecutive championships as the Mets in 1975 and 1976; in addition, the team won the 1975 Centennial Cup national championship.

While the Spruce Grove Mets had two players reach the National Hockey League (NHL) – Paul Messier and Dave Hoyda, the Saints saw 10 players reach the NHL: six-time Stanley Cup champion Mark Messier, who played one season with the Mets and one with the Saints; three-time Stanley Cup champion Ken Daneyko, who played two games with the Saints; Chicago Blackhawks player and later Blackhawks WGN-AM radio color analyst Troy Murray; Steven Reinprecht; Stu Barnes; Mike Comrie; Fernando Pisani; Steven Goertzen; René Bourque; and Jamie Lundmark.

Spruce Grove Mets statistics
Season	GP	W	L	T	GF	GA	Pts	Finish	Playoffs
1972–73	60	25	33	2	257	315	52	5th place	Did not qualify
1973–74	60	30	27	3	280	254	63	3rd place	Lost semifinal against Red Deer (4:0)
1974–75	60	44	16	0	368	220	88	1st place	Won final against Drumheller (4:3)
1975–76	60	35	22	3	312	258	73	2nd place	Won final against Taber (4:0)
1976–77	60	35	23	2	263	235	72	4th place	Lost quarterfinal against Taber (4:0)

Source: "Spruce Grove Mets statistics and history". hockeydb.com.

=== St. Albert Saints ===
The Saints' old logo until the 1989 season.

In 1977, following a change of ownership, the franchise relocated to St. Albert and rebranded as the Saints. After moving to St. Albert, the franchise won four AJHL championships, taking the 1981, 1982 and 1996 Carling O'Keefe Cups as well as the 1998 (renamed) Rogers Wireless Cup.

The Saints were involved in one of the most tragic incidents in junior hockey history; during a February 1980 game, a clean hit by a Saints player on Sherwood Park Crusaders captain Trevor Elton resulted in the death of Elton. The Saints were also involved in one of the most violent incidents, a bench-clearing brawl on November 21, 1979, between the Saints and the Red Deer Rustlers. This brawl resulted in the suspension of several players, as well as Saints head coach Doug Messier and Rustlers' trainer Terry Sexsmith for getting a little too involved in the battle. Sexsmith was later banned from the AJHL for life. It is reported that Messier had four affiliated Junior B players dressed and hiding in the locker room who then joined the brawl, as planned, soon after it started.

As the 21st century rolled around, complaints increasingly began to grow that the Saints' arena, Akinsdale Arena, was of a calibre too low to house a junior 'A' franchise. Various newer arenas seating over a thousand, such as the Sherwood Park Crusaders' Sherwood Park Arena, the 2,000-seat Jubilee Recreation Centre, home of the Fort Saskatchewan Traders, and then vacant 1,200-seat Grant Fuhr Arena in Spruce Grove - which was expected to receive a significant upgrade - are all within a short drive of St. Albert. Akinsdale Arena, by comparison, was relatively old and very small, seating only 611 with room for 200 standing, the smallest capacity in the league. The arena also suffered in terms of parking, amenities, and quality of view.

By the 2002-03 season, it was becoming clear that the Saints would be moved, with Barrhead or the oil town of Leduc frequently cited as potential locations. The team was even forced to play out its last games in Edmonton's Bill Hunter Arena, where it never drew crowds of less than double Akinsdale's maximum capacity. The Saints moved to Spruce Grove in 2004.

St. Albert Saints statistics
Season	GP	W	L	T	SOL	Pts	GF	GA	Regular season	Post-season
1977–78	60	38	21	1	0	77	318	264	2nd place	Lost second round
1978–79	60	39	20	1	0	79	311	250	3rd place	Lost second round
1979–80	59	34	23	2	0	70	313	237	3rd place	
1980–81	60	33	24	3	0	69	285	249	2nd place	Won final against Taber (4:3)
1981–82	60	46	14	0	0	92	338	199	1st place	Won final against Calgary (4:3)
1982–83	60	41	19	0	0	82	372	239	1st place	
1983–84	60	37	23	0	0	74	340	276	2nd place	
1984–85	60	36	20	4	0	76	333	260	2nd place	
1985–86	52	31	20	1	0	63	297	248	1st place	
1986–87	60	37	20	3	0	77	307	241	2nd place	Lost final against Red Deer (4:2)
1987–88	60	42	18	0	0	84	320	206	1st place	Lost final against Calgary (4:1)
1988–89	60	28	29	3	0	59	264	262	3rd place	Lost first round
1989–90	60	16	41	3	0	35	245	328	5th place	Lost first round
1990–91	56	30	23	3	0	63	197	201	4th place	
1991–92	60	37	20	0	3	77	278	254	4th place	
1992–93	56	34	20	0	2	70	269	224	3rd place	
1993–94	56	21	34	0	1	43	210	253	7th place	
1994–95	56	29	23	0	4	62	232	235	4th place	
1995–96	60	38	17	0	5	81	268	194	3rd place	Won final against Fort McMurray (4:3)
1996–97	60	34	22	0	4	72	226	221	3rd place	
1997–98	60	42	15	0	3	87	311	184	1st place	Won final against Fort Saskatchewan (4:2)
1998–99	62	43	19	0	0	86	286	202	1st place	Lost final against Calgary (4:0)
1999–00	64	19	43	0	2	40	209	315	6th place	
2000–01	64	37	21	6	0	80	227	190	3rd place	
2001–02	64	42	12	10	0	94	254	169	1st place	
2002–03	64	38	20	6	0	82	250	196	2nd place	Lost final against Camrose (4:3)
2003–04	60	36	22	2	0	74	210	187	2nd place	

Source: "St. Albert Saints statistics and history". hockeydb.com.

=== Playoff record ===
- 1971 DNQ
- 1972 DNQ
- 1973 DNQ
- 1974 Lost semi-final

Red Deer Rustlers defeated Edmonton Mets 4-games-to-none

- 1975 Won League, won Alta/BC Championship, won Abbott Cup, won 1975 Centennial Cup

Spruce Grove Mets defeated Calgary Canucks 4-games-to-1
Spruce Grove Mets defeated Drumheller Falcons 4-games-to-3 AJHL CHAMPIONS
Spruce Grove Mets defeated Bellingham Blazers (BCJHL) 4-games-to-2 ALTA/BC CHAMPIONS
Spruce Grove Mets defeated Selkirk Steelers (MJHL) 4-games-to-2 ABBOTT CUP CHAMPIONS
Spruce Grove Mets defeated Guelph CMC's (SOJHL) 4-games-to-2 CENTENNIAL CUP CHAMPIONS

- 1976 Won League, won Alta/BC Championship, won Abbott Cup, lost 1976 Centennial Cup

Spruce Grove Mets defeated Red Deer Rustlers 4-games-to-2
Spruce Grove Mets defeated Taber Golden Suns 4-games-to-none AJHL CHAMPIONS
Spruce Grove Mets defeated Nor'Wes Caps (PJHL) 4-games-to-1 ALTA/BC CHAMPIONS
Spruce Grove Mets defeated Prince Albert Raiders (SJHL) 4-games-to-1 ABBOTT CUP CHAMPIONS
Rockland Nationals (CJHL) defeated Spruce Grove Mets 4-games-to-1

- 1977 Lost quarter-final

Taber Golden Suns defeated Spruce Grove Mets 4-games-to-none

- 1978 Lost semi-final round robin

St. Albert Saints defeated Red Deer Rustlers 4-games-to-3
Third in semi-final round robin (1-3) vs. Fort Saskatchewan Traders and Calgary Canucks

- 1979 Lost semi-final round robin

St. Albert Saints defeated Taber Golden Suns 4-games-to-1
Third in semi-final round robin (2-2) vs. Calgary Canucks and Fort Saskatchewan Traders

- 1980 Lost semi-final

St. Albert Saints defeated Fort Saskatchewan Traders 3-games-to-none
Red Deer Rustlers defeated St. Albert Saints 4-games-to-1

- 1981 Won League, won Atla/BC Championship, lost Abbott Cup

St. Albert Saints defeated Red Deer Rustlers 3-games-to-1
St. Albert Saints defeated Sherwood Park Crusaders 4-games-to-2
St. Albert Saints defeated Taber Golden Suns 4-games-to-3 AJHL CHAMPIONS
St. Albert Saints defeated Penticton Knights (BCJHL) 4-games-to-1 ALTA/BC CHAMPIONS
Prince Albert Raiders (SJHL) defeated St. Albert Saints 4-games-to-none

- 1982 Won League, won Atla/BC Championship, lost Abbott Cup

St. Albert Saints defeated Hobbema Hawks 4-games-to-none
St. Albert Saints defeated Fort McMurray Oil Barons 4-games-to-none
St. Albert Saints defeated Calgary Spurs 4-games-to-3 AJHL CHAMPIONS
St. Albert Saints defeated Penticton Knights (BCJHL) 4-games-to-3 ALTA/BC CHAMPIONS
Prince Albert Raiders (SJHL) defeated St. Albert Saints 4-games-to-1

- 1983 Lost semi-final

St. Albert Saints defeated Sherwood Park Crusaders 4-games-to-none
Fort McMurray Oil Barons defeated St. Albert Saints 4-games-to-1

- 1984 Lost semi-final

St. Albert Saints defeated Sherwood Park Crusaders 4-games-to-3
Fort Saskatchewan Traders defeated St. Albert Saints 4-games-to-3

- 1985 Lost quarter-final

Fort Saskatchewan Traders defeated St. Albert Saints 4-games-to-2

- 1986 Lost quarter-final

Fort McMurray Oil Barons defeated St. Albert Saints 4-games-to-1

- 1987 Lost final

St. Albert Saints defeated Fort McMurray Oil Barons 4-games-to-2
St. Albert Saints defeated Sherwood Park Crusaders 4-games-to-3
Red Deer Rustlers defeated St. Albert Saints 4-games-to-2

- 1988 Lost final

St. Albert Saints defeated Fort McMurray Oil Barons 4-games-to-2
St. Albert Saints defeated Hobbema Hawks 4-games-to-2
Calgary Canucks defeated St. Albert Saints 4-games-to-1

- 1989 Lost quarter-final

Sherwood Park Crusaders defeated St. Albert Saints 4-games-to-2

- 1990 Lost quarter-final

Calgary Canucks defeated St. Albert Saints 4-games-to-3

- 1991 Lost quarter-final

Fort McMurray Oil Barons defeated St. Albert Saints 4-games-to-none

- 1992 Lost quarter-final

Fort Saskatchewan Traders defeated St. Albert Saints 4-games-to-3

- 1993 Lost semi-final

St. Albert Saints defeated Calgary Canucks 5-games-to-2
Fort Saskatchewan Traders defeated St. Albert Saints 4-games-to-3

- 1994 Lost semi-final

St. Albert Saints defeated Fort Saskatchewan Traders 4-games-to-3
Olds Grizzlys defeated St. Albert Saints 4-games-to-none

- 1995 Lost quarter-final

Sherwood Park Crusaders defeated St. Albert Saints 4-games-to-1

- 1996 Won League, lost Doyle Cup

St. Albert Saints defeated Sherwood Park Crusaders 4-games-to-3
St. Albert Saints defeated Olds Grizzlys 4-games-to-none
St. Albert Saints defeated Fort McMurray Oil Barons 4-games-to-3 AJHL CHAMPIONS
Vernon Vipers (BCHL) defeated St. Albert Saints 4-games-to-3

- 1997 Lost semi-final

St. Albert Saints defeated Sherwood Park Crusaders 4-games-to-2
Fort McMurray Oil Barons defeated St. Albert Saints 4-games-to-2

- 1998 Won League, lost Doyle Cup

St. Albert Saints defeated Olds Grizzlys 4-games-to-2
St. Albert Saints defeated Calgary Canucks 4-games-to-3
St. Albert Saints defeated Fort Saskatchewan Traders 4-games-to-2 AJHL CHAMPIONS
South Surrey Eagles (BCHL) defeated St. Albert Saints 4-games-to-2

- 1999 Lost final

St. Albert Saints defeated Grande Prairie Storm 4-games-to-1
St. Albert Saints defeated Lloydminster Blazers 4-games-to-3
Calgary Canucks defeated St. Albert Saints 4-games-to-none

- 2000 Lost Preliminary

Fort Saskatchewan Traders defeated St. Albert Saints 3-games-to-1

- 2001 Lost quarter-final

St. Albert Saints defeated Sherwood Park Crusaders 3-games-to-none
Grande Prairie Storm defeated St. Albert Saints 4-games-to-1

- 2002 Lost quarter-final

Grande Prairie Storm defeated St. Albert Saints 4-games-to-2

- 2003 Lost final

St. Albert Saints defeated Lloydminster Blazers 4-games-to-1
St. Albert Saints defeated Grande Prairie Storm 4-games-to-1
St. Albert Saints defeated Sherwood Park Crusaders 4-games-to-1
Camrose Kodiaks defeated St. Albert Saints 4-games-to-3

- 2004 Lost Preliminary

Lloydminster Blazers defeated St. Albert Saints 3-games-to-1

== See also ==
- List of ice hockey teams in Alberta

== Sources ==
- "Champions | History" (PDF). Alberta Junior Hockey League. March 2020.
