= Zarley Zalapski =

Canadian ice hockey defenceman (1968-2017)

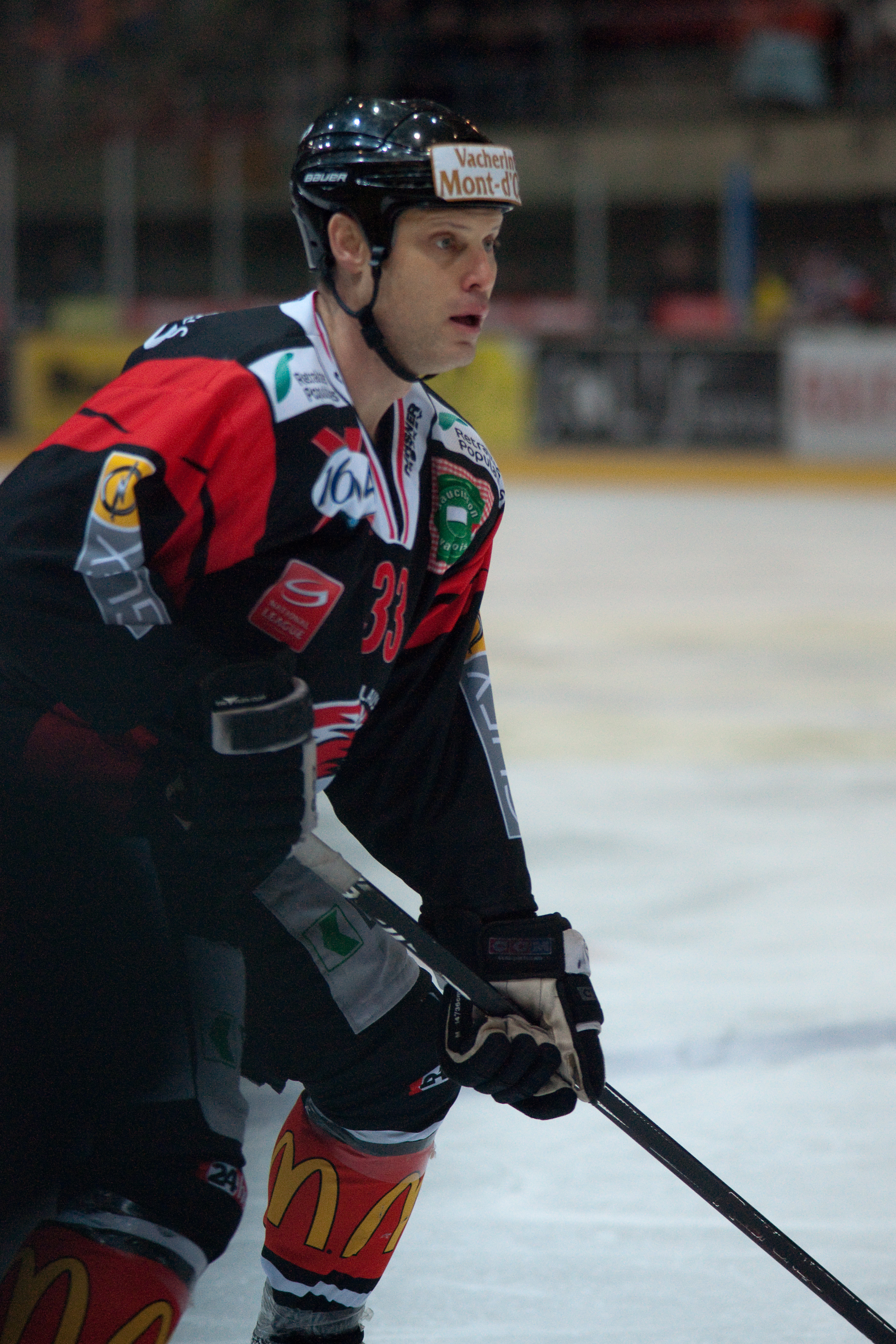
- Zalapski with Lausanne HC in 2010
- Born: April 22, 1968 Edmonton, Alberta, Canada
- Died: December 10, 2017 (aged 49) Calgary, Alberta, Canada
- Height: 6 ft 1 in (185 cm)
- Weight: 215 lb (98 kg; 15 st 5 lb)
- Position: Defence
- Shot: Left
- Played for: Pittsburgh Penguins; Hartford Whalers; Calgary Flames; Montreal Canadiens; Philadelphia Flyers
- National team: Canada
- NHL draft: 4th overall, 1986; Pittsburgh Penguins
- Playing career: 1987–2010

Zarley Bennett Zalapski (April 22, 1968 – December 10, 2017) was a Canadian professional ice hockey defenceman who played from 1987 to 2010.

== Playing career ==
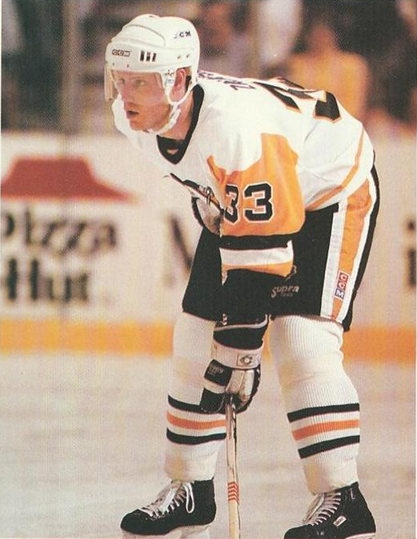
Zalapski in 1989 action shot for Pittsburgh Penguins

Zalapski's career started with the Fort Saskatchewan Traders of the Alberta Junior Hockey League. In his first season with the Traders, Zalapski tallied 70 points in 67 games, including 17 goals. Zalapski spent the next two years playing with the Canadian National Team. Zalapski was picked 4th in the 1st round by the Pittsburgh Penguins in the 1986 NHL entry draft. He tallied 99 goals, and 285 assists, for a total of 384 points in his 637 games in the NHL. He also registered 684 penalty minutes.

He was a member of the Canadian Olympic Hockey team in the 1988 Winter Olympics held in Calgary, Alberta. Canada would end up missing the medal podium and finished in fourth place. Although Canada lost their first game in the medal round, Zalapski played a key role in the team's victories over West Germany and Czechoslovakia.

After his 11-year career in the National Hockey League playing for the Penguins, Hartford Whalers, Calgary Flames, Montreal Canadiens, and Philadelphia Flyers, he then played for teams in hockey leagues in Germany, Italy, and Austria. He finally found his stride when in Switzerland in the Swiss National League. Zalapski retired after the 2009–10 NLB season.

== Personal life ==
Zalapski was the son of Len and Bonnie Zalapski. His unusual first name came as a result of his father Len, a golf enthusiast, naming him after professional golfer Kermit Zarley. Zalapski had one sister, Kyla.

Zalapski became a Swiss citizen in 2006 through his marriage to his wife, Klaudjia. The couple had two sons, Zen and Kai.

== Death ==
Zalapski died on December 10, 2017, at the age of 49, after complications from a viral infection. He had been hospitalized in October 2017 with viral myocarditis and was released later that month after treatment.

Following his death, his sister Kyla Zalapski wanted to know if he had any brain health issues. Zalapski had had at least two concussions in his NHL career. His sister had his brain sent to Toronto to be examined. Neuropathologist Dr. Lili-Naz Hazrati determined that Zalapski had Chronic Traumatic Encephalopathy (CTE). He also had more tau (abnormal brain protein) than found in another former NHL defenceman, Steve Montador, who died at age 35.

== Awards ==
- Named to the NHL All-Rookie Team in 1989.
- Played in NHL All-Star Game (1993)

== Career statistics ==
=== Regular season and playoffs ===
| | | | Regular season | | | | | Playoffs |
| Season | Team | League | GP | G | A | Pts | PIM | GP | G | A | Pts | PIM |
|---|---|---|---|---|---|---|---|---|---|---|---|---|
| 1984–85 | Fort Saskatchewan Traders | AJHL | 57 | 14 | 45 | 59 | 14 | 10 | 3 | 8 | 11 | 0 |
| 1985–86 | Fort Saskatchewan Traders | AJHL | 27 | 20 | 33 | 53 | 46 | — | — | — | — | — |
| 1985–86 | Canadian National Team | Intl | 32 | 2 | 4 | 6 | 10 | — | — | — | — | — |
| 1986–87 | Canadian National Team | Intl | 74 | 11 | 29 | 40 | 28 | — | — | — | — | — |
| 1987–88 | Canadian National Team | Intl | 55 | 4 | 16 | 20 | 34 | — | — | — | — | — |
| 1987–88 | Pittsburgh Penguins | NHL | 15 | 3 | 8 | 11 | 7 | — | — | — | — | — |
| 1988–89 | Pittsburgh Penguins | NHL | 58 | 12 | 33 | 45 | 57 | 11 | 1 | 8 | 9 | 13 |
| 1989–90 | Pittsburgh Penguins | NHL | 51 | 6 | 25 | 31 | 37 | — | — | — | — | — |
| 1990–91 | Pittsburgh Penguins | NHL | 66 | 12 | 36 | 48 | 59 | — | — | — | — | — |
| 1990–91 | Hartford Whalers | NHL | 11 | 3 | 3 | 6 | 6 | 6 | 1 | 3 | 4 | 8 |
| 1991–92 | Hartford Whalers | NHL | 79 | 20 | 37 | 57 | 120 | 7 | 2 | 3 | 5 | 6 |
| 1992–93 | Hartford Whalers | NHL | 83 | 14 | 51 | 65 | 94 | — | — | — | — | — |
| 1993–94 | Hartford Whalers | NHL | 56 | 7 | 30 | 37 | 56 | — | — | — | — | — |
| 1993–94 | Calgary Flames | NHL | 13 | 3 | 7 | 10 | 18 | 7 | 0 | 3 | 3 | 2 |
| 1994–95 | Calgary Flames | NHL | 48 | 4 | 24 | 28 | 46 | 7 | 0 | 4 | 4 | 4 |
| 1995–96 | Calgary Flames | NHL | 80 | 12 | 17 | 29 | 115 | 4 | 0 | 1 | 1 | 10 |
| 1996–97 | Calgary Flames | NHL | 2 | 0 | 0 | 0 | 0 | — | — | — | — | — |
| 1997–98 | Calgary Flames | NHL | 35 | 2 | 7 | 9 | 41 | — | — | — | — | — |
| 1997–98 | Montreal Canadiens | NHL | 28 | 1 | 5 | 6 | 22 | 6 | 0 | 1 | 1 | 4 |
| 1998–99 | ZSC Lions | NDA | 11 | 1 | 5 | 6 | 37 | 3 | 1 | 0 | 1 | 4 |
| 1999–00 | Long Beach Ice Dogs | IHL | 7 | 0 | 5 | 5 | 6 | — | — | — | — | — |
| 1999–00 | Utah Grizzlies | IHL | 56 | 4 | 24 | 28 | 69 | 5 | 1 | 1 | 2 | 4 |
| 1999–00 | Philadelphia Flyers | NHL | 12 | 0 | 2 | 2 | 6 | — | — | — | — | — |
| 2000–01 | Houston Aeros | IHL | 9 | 0 | 2 | 2 | 12 | — | — | — | — | — |
| 2000–01 | München Barons | DEL | 20 | 3 | 3 | 6 | 43 | 3 | 0 | 0 | 0 | 2 |
| 2001–02 | HC Merano | ITA | 26 | 5 | 9 | 14 | 12 | — | — | — | — | — |
| 2002–03 | Esbjerg IK | DEN | 5 | 0 | 6 | 6 | 0 | — | — | — | — | — |
| 2002–03 | IF Björklöven | Allsv | 14 | 1 | 4 | 5 | 6 | 3 | 0 | 0 | 0 | 4 |
| 2004–05 | Kalamazoo Wings | UHL | 11 | 2 | 2 | 4 | 12 | — | — | — | — | — |
| 2005–06 | Rapperswil–Jona Lakers | NLA | 4 | 0 | 1 | 1 | 18 | — | — | — | — | — |
| 2005–06 | Innsbrucker EV | AUT | 2 | 0 | 0 | 0 | 0 | — | — | — | — | — |
| 2005–06 | EHC Visp | SUI–2 | 6 | 0 | 2 | 2 | 8 | — | — | — | — | — |
| 2006–07 | EHC Chur | SUI–2 | 5 | 1 | 5 | 6 | 36 | — | — | — | — | — |
| 2007–08 | EHC Biel–Bienne | SUI–2 | 33 | 2 | 14 | 16 | 46 | — | — | — | — | — |
| 2008–09 | EHC Olten | SUI–2 | 34 | 2 | 18 | 20 | 56 | — | — | — | — | — |
| 2008–09 | Lausanne HC | SUI–2 | 2 | 0 | 1 | 1 | 2 | 14 | 1 | 7 | 8 | 10 |
| 2009–10 | Lausanne HC | SUI–2 | 28 | 1 | 6 | 7 | 36 | 20 | 1 | 4 | 5 | 20 |
| NHL totals | | | 637 | 99 | 285 | 384 | 684 | 48 | 4 | 23 | 27 | 47 |

=== International ===
| Year | Team | Event | Results | GP | G | A | Pts | PIM |
|---|---|---|---|---|---|---|---|---|
| 1987 | Canada | WC | 4th | 10 | 0 | 3 | 3 | 2 |
| 1988 | Canada | OG | 4th | 8 | 1 | 3 | 4 | 2 |
| Senior totals | | | | 18 | 1 | 6 | 7 | 4 |

| Preceded by Craig Simpson | Pittsburgh Penguins first-round draft pick 1986 | Succeeded by Chris Joseph |
