= Sherwood Park Crusaders =

Junior ice hockey team

- City: Sherwood Park, Alberta
- League: British Columbia Hockey League
- Founded: 1976
- Home arena: Randy Rosen Rink
- Colours: Green and white
- General manager: Adam Sergerie
- Head coach: Brennan Menard
- Website: spcrusaders.com

Franchise history
- 1976–1978: Edmonton Crusaders
- 1978–present: Sherwood Park Crusaders

The Sherwood Park Crusaders are a Junior ice hockey team in the BCHL. They play in Sherwood Park, Alberta, Canada, with home games at Sherwood Park Arena Sports Centre. The team was part of the AJHL, until 2024 when it switched mid-season to the BCHL.

== History ==
The Edmonton Crusaders joined the AJHL in 1976 playing out of the Jasper Place Arena. The AJHL franchise was revived from a dormant entry controlled by Jim McCaddie. The Edmonton Crusaders played two seasons in the AJHL.

In 1978, a group of Sherwood Park businessmen, headed by John Fisher, Frank Chase, and Al Bishop, moved the franchise to Sherwood Park. John Fisher, a Sherwood Park resident and former Alberta Oilers' player, became the first coach of the Crusaders.

During a game on February 21, 1980, twenty-year-old captain Trevor Elton was hit cleanly along the boards by a player on the St. Albert Saints in St. Albert, Alberta. Elton landed and went into convulsions and died later that night while in hospital. The 1980–81 team was coached by Gregg Pilling, and finished first place in the South Division.

During the 1985–86 season, Brett Pearce suffered a major injury which left him paralyzed. During the same season, the Crusaders capture the AJHL North Division championship. In 1986–87, the Crusaders won their first regular season championship, followed by another division title in 1989–90. The Crusaders made it the league playoff finals in 1985, 1986, and 1990, but never won the playoff championship. On July 2, 1996, Crusaders' general manager and part owner, Al McDonald died from cancer.

At the conclusion of the 1998 season, the team was purchased from Art Cox by a group of local businessmen headed by Tom Maxwell. The group has since turned the club into a non-profit society. The 1998–99 season had the team finish in last place in the North Division with a 13–44–3–2 record. In 1999, the entire team was rebuilt with mostly younger players and finished with a 7–52–3–2 record, the worst Junior A record in the 1999–2000 Canadian Junior Hockey League season.

The 2000–01 season had a new head coach in Doug Schum and qualified for the playoffs with a 20–29–6–2 record before losing to St. Albert Saints in three games. The Crusaders lost only five players going into the 2001–02 season and replaced Schum with head coach Dan Auchenberg. The team started slow in the season and then went on a 15-game winning streak to finish third in the North Division. Head coach Dan Auchenberg won the AJHL's Coach of the Year for the team's turnaround. They then swept their first round playoff series against the Lloydminster Blazers before a losing to the Drayton Valley Thunder in six games.

The team continued its improvement winning their four of their first five games before returning goaltender, Chris Denman, was injured and the team began trading for and rotating many goaltenders, including female goaltender Shannon Szabados for eight games. Szabados, who would later play for the Canadian women's national team for over a decade, earned two shutouts and a 7–1 record. The Crusaders finished the season with 43 wins, earning a first place finish in the North Division and the regular season title. In the first round of the playoffs, the Bonnyville Pontiacs were swept in four games. The playoff format for that season gave the team a second round bye and a 19-day layoff. The team then lost to the St. Albert Saints in five games in the division finals.

In the 2003–04 season, the team lost several of their veteran players, but head coach Auchenberg and goaltender Szabados returned. The team finished the season in fourth place in the North Division and were swept out of the playoffs in the first round by Drayton Valley.

On January 20, 2024, it was announced that the team, along with four other AJHL teams, would join the BCHL in the 2024-2025 season. The AJHL responded to the announcement by cancelling most of the five teams' remaining scheduled matches except those between each other. It was then decided that the five Alberta-based teams would play out the rest of the 2023-24 season as a separate division under the aegis of the BCHL.

== Season-by-season record ==
Note: GP = Games played, W = Wins, L = Losses, T/OTL = Ties/Overtime losses, SOL = Shootout losses, Pts = Points, GF = Goals for, GA = Goals against

Season	GP	W	L	T/OTL	SOL	Pts	GF	GA	Finish	Playoffs
1976–77	60	5	55	0	—	10	182	376	7th Overall	did not qualify
1977–78	60	30	29	1	—	61	276	260	4th Overall	Lost quarterfinals, 3–4 vs. Fort Saskatchewan Traders
1978–79	60	12	48	0	—	24	230	350	7th Overall	did not qualify
1979–80	58	19	39	0	—	38	253	330	7th Overall	Lost quarterfinals, 0–3 vs. Red Deer Rustlers
1980–81	60	36	23	1	—	73	294	284	1st North	Won quarterfinals, 3–0 vs. Fort Saskatchewan Traders; Lost semifinals, 2–4 vs. St. Albert Saints
1981–82	60	23	37	0	—	46	254	306	5th North	did not qualify
1982–83	60	25	34	1	—	51	296	356	4th North	Lost quarterfinals, 0–4 vs. St. Albert Saints
1983–84	60	28	31	1	—	57	287	302	3rd North	Lost quarterfinals, 3–4 vs. St. Albert Saints
1984–85	60	37	20	3	—	77	319	243	1st North	Won quarterfinals, 4–1 vs. Hobbema Hawks; Won semifinals, 4–0 vs. Fort Saskatchewan Traders; Lost finals, 2–4 vs. Red Deer Rustlers
1985–86	52	30	19	3	—	69	261	206	2nd North	Won quarterfinals, 4–1 vs. Fort Saskatchewan Traders; Won semifinals, 4–1 vs. Fort McMurray Oil Barons; Lost finals, 3–4 vs. Calgary Canucks
1986–87	60	43	13	4	—	90	274	192	1st North	Won quarterfinals, 4–1 vs. Fort Saskatchewan Traders; Lost semifinals, 3–4 vs. St. Albert Saints
1987–88	60	18	41	1	—	37	205	301	5th North	did not qualify
1988–89	60	39	19	3	—	81	322	243	1st North	Won quarterfinals, 4–2 vs. St. Albert Saints; Lost semifinals, 0–4 vs. Fort Saskatchewan Traders
1989–90	60	26	33	1	—	53	293	304	4th North	Won quarterfinals, 4–0 vs. Fort McMurray Oil Barons; Won semifinals, 4–3 vs. Lloydminster Blazers; Lost finals, 2–4 vs. Calgary Canucks
1990–91	56	16	39	1	—	33	204	287	8th Overall	Lost quarterfinals, 0–4 vs. Fort Saskatchewan Traders
1991–92	60	16	40	—	4	36	303	397	8th Overall	Lost quarterfinals, 0–4 vs. Olds Grizzlys
1992–93	56	17	38	—	1	35	211	293	8th Overall	Lost quarterfinals, 4–5 vs. Fort Saskatchewan Traders
1993–94	56	35	20	—	1	71	247	208	2nd Overall	Won quarterfinals, 4–0 vs. Lloydminster Blazers; Lost semifinals, 2–4 vs. Fort McMurray Oil Barons
1994–95	56	29	26	—	1	59	253	234	5th Overall	Won quarterfinals, 4–1 vs. St. Albert Saints; Lost semifinals, 0–4 vs. Olds Grizzlys
1995–96	60	27	30	—	3	57	229	250	6th Overall	Lost quarterfinals, 3–4 vs. St. Albert Saints
1996–97	60	31	26	—	3	64	223	227	6th Overall	Lost quarterfinals, 2–4 vs. St. Albert Saints
1997–98	60	23	35	—	2	48	199	256	10th Overall	did not qualify
1998–99	62	16	44	—	2	34	198	323	7th North	did not qualify
1999–00	64	10	52	—	2	22	186	323	7th North	did not qualify
2000–01	64	27	29	8	—	62	235	245	6th North	Lost preliminary series, 0–3 vs. St. Albert Saints
2001–02	64	38	21	5	—	81	260	193	3rd North	Won Preliminary series, 3–0 vs. Lloydminster Blazers; Lost quarterfinals, 2–4 vs. Drayton Valley Thunder
2002–03	64	43	13	8	—	94	259	165	1st North	Won Div. Quarterfinals, 4–0 vs. Bonnyville Pontiacs; Bye; Lost Div. Finals, 1–4 vs. St. Albert Saints
2003–04	60	30	25	5	—	65	184	189	4th North	Lost preliminary series, 0–3 vs. Drayton Valley Thunder
2004–05	64	14	43	7	—	35	159	275	8th North	did not qualify
2005–06	60	15	35	10	—	40	142	215	8th North	did not qualify
2006–07	60	22	28	10	—	54	150	199	7th North	Lost preliminary series, 0–3 vs. Grande Prairie Storm
2007–08	62	28	25	9	—	65	191	206	5th North	Lost preliminary series, 2–3 vs. Bonnyville Pontiacs
2008–09	62	41	20	1	—	83	223	169	3rd North	Won Div. Quarterfinals, 3–1 vs. St. Albert Steel; Lost div. semi-finals, 2–4 vs. Grande Prairie Storm
2009–10	60	33	18	9	—	75	206	181	4th North	Lost div. quarter-finals, 0–3 vs. Bonnyville Pontiacs
2010–11	60	29	25	6	—	64	175	198	6th North	Lost div. quarter-finals, 0–3 vs. Bonnyville Pontiacs
2011–12	60	37	19	4	—	78	231	199	4th North	Won Div. Quarterfinals, 3–2 vs. Bonnyville Pontiacs; Lost div. semi-finals, 1–4 vs. Fort McMurray Oil Barons
2012–13	60	28	25	7	—	63	184	183	7th North	Won Div. Quarterfinals, 3–1 vs. Grande Prairie Storm; Lost div. semi-finals, 2–4 vs. Spruce Grove Saints
2013–14	60	29	28	3	—	61	192	208	4th North	Won Div. Quarterfinals, 3–0 vs. Bonnyville Pontiacs; Lost div. semi-finals, 3–4 vs. Spruce Grove Saints
2014–15	60	28	25	7	—	63	173	176	5th North	Won Div. Quarterfinals, 3–1 vs. Fort McMurray Oil Barons; Lost div. semi-finals, 2–4 vs. Spruce Grove Saints
2015–16	60	39	19	2	—	80	240	194	5th North	Won Div. Quarterfinals, 3–1 vs. Bonnyville Pontiacs; Lost div. semi-finals, 0–4 vs. Spruce Grove Saints
2016–17	60	32	25	3	1	67	233	235	5th of 8, North; 11th of 16, AJHL	Lost div. quarter-finals, 1–3 vs. Bonnyville Pontiacs
2017–18	60	27	31	2	—	56	209	241	5th of 8, North; 9th of 16, AJHL	Lost div. quarter-finals, 2–3 vs. Grande Prairie Storm
2018–19	60	44	14	2	—	90	254	159	1st of 8, North; 2nd of 16, AJHL	Won Div. Semifinals, 4–2 vs. Fort McMurray Oil Barons; Lost Div. Finals, 2–4 vs. Spruce Grove Saints
2019–20	58	49	9	9	—	98	271	128	1st of 8, North; 1st of 15, AJHL	Postseason cancelled
2024–25	54	33	20	1	—	67	252	199	5th of 11, Interior; 6th of 21, BCHL	Won Div. Quarterfinals, 4–0 vs. Salmon Arm Silverbacks; Lost Div. Semifinals, 0–4 vs. Brooks Bandits

== NHL alumni ==
The following former Crusaders have gone on to play in the NHL:

- Matt Berlin
- Steve Dykstra
- Jim Ennis
- Scott Ferguson
- Ron Fischer
- Chris Forbes
- Nick Holden
- Matt Kassian
- Stu Kulak
- Greg Pankewicz
- Paxton Schulte
- Sam Steel
- Garry Valk
- Ed Ward

The following former Crusaders have gone on to play for the Canada national women's ice hockey team:

- Shannon Szabados

== Retired numbers and honored personnel ==
- Al McDonald: General manager and part owner died from cancer on July 2, 1996. The Sherwood Park Crusaders have placed a banner in his memory in the Sherwood Park Arena and dedicated a trophy for a Crusaders' player that best combines academic and athletic excellence each season.
- #10 Trevor Elton: Captain of the Crusaders during the 1979–80 season. In February 1980 during a game against the St. Albert Saints, he was on the receiving end of a body check. Trevor collapsed and later died as a result of the hit. Elton's number was retired and a banner was placed in the arena to honour him. The Crusaders named the team's most valuable player trophy after him.
- #11 Brett Pearce: In 1985, Pearce won the Crusaders' Most Improved Player award and an accident during a game the following season paralyzed him. Pearce's number was retired and a banner was placed in the arena to honour him. The Crusaders renamed the team's Most Improved Player trophy after him.

== See also ==
- List of ice hockey teams in Alberta
