= Tony Camazzola =

Canadian ice hockey player (born 1962)

- Born: September 11, 1962 (age 63) Burnaby, British Columbia, Canada
- Height: 6 ft 2 in (188 cm)
- Weight: 205 lb (93 kg; 14 st 9 lb)
- Position: Defence
- Shot: Left
- Played for: Washington Capitals
- NHL draft: 194th overall, 1980; Washington Capitals
- Playing career: 1981–1990

Anthony Bert Camazzola (born September 11, 1962) is a Canadian former professional ice hockey defenceman. He played three games in the National Hockey League with the Washington Capitals during the 1981–82 season. The rest of his career, which lasted from 1982 to 1990, was spent in the minor leagues. He was selected in by the Capitals 194th overall in the 1980 NHL entry draft. His brother, Jim Camazzola, also played in the NHL and in Europe.

== Career statistics ==
=== Regular season and playoffs ===
			Regular season					Playoffs
Season	Team	League	GP	G	A	Pts	PIM	GP	G	A	Pts	PIM
1979–80	Bellingham Blazers	BCJHL	—	—	—	—	—	—	—	—	—	—
1979–80	Brandon Wheat Kings	WHL	7	0	2	2	21	7	0	0	0	2
1980–81	Brandon Wheat Kings	WHL	69	4	20	24	144	5	0	1	1	10
1981–82	Washington Capitals	NHL	3	0	0	0	4	—	—	—	—	—
1981–82	Brandon Wheat Kings	WHL	64	6	23	29	210	4	1	1	2	26
1982–83	Hershey Bears	AHL	52	3	8	11	106	—	—	—	—	—
1983–84	Hershey Bears	AHL	63	6	10	16	138	—	—	—	—	—
1984–85	Toledo Goaldiggers	IHL	28	2	8	10	84	6	0	1	1	9
1984–85	Fort Wayne Komets	IHL	15	0	3	3	56	—	—	—	—	—
1985–86	Fort Wayne Komets	IHL	54	5	7	12	144	14	6	0	6	7
1986–87	Fort Wayne Komets	IHL	74	21	16	37	137	11	4	1	5	44
1987–88	Fort Wayne Komets	IHL	46	10	6	16	140	5	2	0	2	19
1988–89	Fort Wayne Komets	IHL	12	2	3	5	26	—	—	—	—	—
1989–90	Fort Wayne Komets	IHL	2	0	0	0	15	—	—	—	—	—
IHL totals			231	40	43	83	602	36	12	2	14	79
NHL totals			3	0	0	0	4	—	—	—	—	—
