= Taber Golden Suns =

- City: Taber, Alberta
- League: Alberta Junior Hockey League
- Division: South

Franchise history
- 1974–1981: Taber Golden Suns
- 1981-present: Olds Grizzlys

The Taber Golden Suns were a Junior A ice hockey team in the Alberta Junior Hockey League based in Taber, Alberta, Canada.

== History ==
The Golden Suns were founded in 1974 as an expansion club, lasting seven seasons before being sold and relocated to Olds, Alberta as the Olds Grizzlys. During their tenure, they reached the AJHL finals three times, losing each time.

The Golden Suns produced four NHLers during their time: Lindy Ruff, Rocky Saganiuk, Gord Williams and Earl Ingarfield, Jr.

== Season-by-season record ==
Note: GP = Games played, W = Wins, L = Losses, T = Ties Pts = Points, GF = Goals for, GA = Goals against

Season	GP	W	L	T	GF	GA	Points	Finish	Playoffs
1974-75	60	28	31	1	338	308	57	4th overall	
1975-76	60	29	31	0	322	280	58	4th overall	Lost final
1976-77	60	36	23	1	353	296	73	3rd overall	Lost final
1977-78	60	16	42	2	291	368	34	7th overall	Out of playoffs
1978-79	60	34	26	0	302	284	68	4th overall	
1979-80	59	26	33	0	260	295	52	5th overall	
1980-81	60	26	33	1	285	393	53	3rd South	Lost final

=== Playoffs ===
- 1975 Lost semi-final

Drumheller Falcons defeated Taber Golden Suns 4-games-to-1

- 1976 Lost final

Taber Golden Suns defeated Calgary Canucks 4-games-to-3
Spruce Grove Mets defeated Taber Golden Suns 4-games-to-none

- 1977 Lost final

Taber Golden Suns defeated Spruce Grove Mets 4-games-to-none
Second in semi-final round robin (2-2) vs. Calgary Canucks and Red Deer Rustlers
Calgary Canucks defeated Taber Golden Suns 4-games-to-1

- 1978 DNQ
- 1979 Lost quarter-final

St. Albert Saints defeated Taber Golden Suns 4-games-to-1

- 1980 Lost quarter-final

Calgary Spurs defeated Taber Golden Suns 3-games-to-2

- 1981 Lost final

Taber Golden Suns defeated Calgary Canucks 3-games-to-2
Taber Golden Suns defeated Calgary Spurs 4-games-to-2
St. Albert Saints defeated Taber Golden Suns 4-games-to-3

== See also ==
- List of ice hockey teams in Alberta
