= Fort Saskatchewan Traders =

Ice hockey team in Alberta, Canada

- City: Fort Saskatchewan, Alberta
- League: Alberta Junior Hockey League
- Division: North
- Home arena: Jubilee Recreation Centre
- Colours: Black, red and white

Franchise history
- 1976–2007: Fort Saskatchewan Traders
- 2007–2012: St. Albert Steel
- 2012–present: Whitecourt Wolverines

The Fort Saskatchewan Traders were an ice hockey team in the Alberta Junior Hockey League. They played in Fort Saskatchewan, Alberta, Canada, at the Jubilee Recreation Centre, capacity 2000.

Founded: 1976–77
Division titles won: 1983–84
Regular season titles won: 1983–84, 1990–91, 1992–93
League Championships won: 1979, 1984
Doyle Cup Titles: None
Royal Bank Cup Titles: None

== History ==
The team's name comes from Fort Saskatchewan's history as a North-West Mounted Police fort, although it was not actually a trading fort, when it was originally settled in 1875.

In 1978–79, the Traders completed their most successful season in the AJHL, as they won the league championship, and then defeated the Richmond Sockeyes of the BCHL in the Vernon Cup (forerunner to the Doyle Cup) before falling to the eventual national champion Prince Albert Raiders in six games at the Centennial Cup finals.

The Traders fell upon hard times in their last years as financial difficulties and low attendance left the future of the Traders in doubt. The Traders were reportedly sold to a group representing St. Albert during the 2005-06 season, however the deal failed to gain league approval. Finally, on March 15, 2007, a deal to relocate the Traders to St. Albert for the 2007–08 season was approved, ending the Traders' 31-year run in Fort Saskatchewan. Only the Calgary Canucks have had a longer tenure in one city. Once relocated, the team was renamed the St. Albert Steel. The team relocated again after the 2011–12 season to Whitecourt where they became the Whitecourt Wolverines.

== Season-by-season record ==
Note: GP = Games played, W = Wins, L = Losses, T/OTL = Ties/Overtime losses, SOL = Shootout losses, Pts = Points, GF = Goals for, GA = Goals against

| Season | GP | W | L | T/OTL | SOL | Points | GF | GA | Finish | Playoffs |
| 1976-77 | 60 | 33 | 24 | 3 | - | 69 | 292 | 280 | 5th Overall | --- |
| 1977-78 | 58 | 37 | 21 | 2 | - | 76 | 345 | 299 | 3rd Overall | --- |
| 1978-79 | 60 | 41 | 18 | 1 | - | 83 | 340 | 246 | 2nd Overall | Won Championship |
| 1979-80 | 59 | 24 | 35 | 0 | - | 48 | 282 | 336 | 6th Overall | --- |
| 1980-81 | 60 | 23 | 36 | 1 | - | 47 | 273 | 316 | 4th North | --- |
| 1981-82 | 60 | 30 | 29 | 1 | - | 61 | 266 | 288 | 3rd North | --- |
| 1982-83 | 60 | 26 | 34 | 0 | - | 52 | 301 | 299 | 3rd North | --- |
| 1983-84 | 60 | 40 | 19 | 1 | - | 81 | 325 | 262 | 1st North | Won Championship |
| 1984-85 | 60 | 36 | 22 | 2 | - | 74 | 312 | 231 | 3rd North | --- |
| 1985-86 | 52 | 21 | 29 | 2 | - | 44 | 227 | 256 | 3rd North | --- |
| 1986-87 | 60 | 24 | 34 | 2 | - | 50 | 258 | 295 | 4th North | --- |
| 1987-88 | 60 | 29 | 30 | 1 | - | 59 | 295 | 280 | 2nd North | --- |
| 1988-89 | 60 | 38 | 21 | 1 | - | 77 | 304 | 270 | 2nd North | --- |
| 1989-90 | 60 | 33 | 27 | 0 | - | 66 | 307 | 263 | 3rd North | --- |
| 1990-91 | 56 | 37 | 15 | 4 | - | 78 | 282 | 218 | 1st Overall | --- |
| 1991-92 | 60 | 31 | 28 | - | 1 | 63 | 246 | 251 | 6th Overall | --- |
| 1992-93 | 56 | 36 | 18 | - | 2 | 74 | 248 | 197 | 1st Overall | --- |
| 1993-94 | 56 | 33 | 21 | - | 2 | 67 | 206 | 175 | 3rd Overall | --- |
| 1994-95 | 56 | 18 | 34 | - | 4 | 40 | 201 | 267 | 9th Overall | --- |
| 1995-96 | 60 | 36 | 19 | - | 5 | 77 | 209 | 189 | 4th Overall | --- |
| 1996-97 | 60 | 26 | 31 | - | 3 | 55 | 247 | 234 | 9th Overall | --- |
| 1997-98 | 60 | 40 | 18 | - | 2 | 82 | 249 | 225 | 3rd Overall | --- |
| 1998-99 | 62 | 37 | 24 | - | 1 | 75 | 294 | 252 | 3rd North | --- |
| 1999-00 | 64 | 35 | 25 | - | 4 | 74 | 272 | 255 | 3rd North | --- |
| 2000-01 | 64 | 26 | 32 | 6 | - | 58 | 249 | 300 | 7th North | --- |
| 2001-02 | 64 | 20 | 41 | 3 | - | 43 | 190 | 315 | 7th North | --- |
| 2002-03 | 64 | 20 | 36 | 8 | - | 48 | 214 | 285 | 7th North | --- |
| 2003-04 | 60 | 16 | 39 | 5 | - | 37 | 159 | 281 | 8th North | Did not qualify |
| 2004-05 | 64 | 19 | 41 | 4 | - | 42 | 157 | 228 | 6th North | |
| 2005-06 | 60 | 37 | 20 | 3 | - | 77 | 201 | 179 | 6th North | Lost in First Round |
| 2006-07 | 60 | 45 | 11 | 4 | - | 94 | 286 | 146 | 1st North | Lost in Final |

=== Playoffs ===
- 1977 Lost quarter-final

Red Deer Rustlers defeated Fort Saskatchewan Traders 4-games-to-2

- 1978 Lost final

Fort Saskatchewan Traders defeated Edmonton Crusaders 4-games-to-3
First in semi-final round robin (3-1) vs. Calgary Canucks and St. Albert Saints
Calgary Canucks defeated Fort Saskatchewan Traders 4-games-to-none

- 1979 Won League, won Alta/BC Championship, lost Abbott Cup

Fort Saskatchewan Traders defeated Calgary Chinooks 4-games-to-none
Second in semi-final round robin (2-2) vs. Calgary Canucks and St. Albert Saints
Fort Saskatchewan Traders defeated Calgary Canucks 4-games-to-3 AJHL CHAMPIONS
Fort Saskatchewan Traders defeated Richmond Sockeyes (PJHL) 4-games-to-1 ALTA/BC CHAMPIONS
Prince Albert Raiders (SJHL) defeated Fort Saskatchewan Traders 4-games-to-2

- 1980 Lost quarter-final

St. Albert Saints defeated Fort Saskatchewan Traders 3-games-to-none

- 1981 Lost quarter-final

Sherwood Park Crusaders defeated Fort Saskatchewan Traders 3-games-to-none

- 1982 Lost quarter-final

Fort McMurray Oil Barons defeated Fort Saskatchewan Traders 4-games-to-2

- 1983 Lost quarter-final

Fort McMurray Oil Barons defeated Fort Saskatchewan Traders 4-games-to-none

- 1984 Won League, lost Alta/BC Championship

Fort Saskatchewan Traders defeated Fort McMurray Oil Barons 4-games-to-none
Fort Saskatchewan Traders defeated St. Albert Saints 4-games-to-3
Fort Saskatchewan Traders defeated Red Deer Rustlers 4-games-to-none AJHL CHAMPIONS
Langley Eagles (BCJHL) defeated Fort Saskatchewan Traders 4-games-to-2

- 1985 Lost semi-final

Fort Saskatchewan Traders defeated St. Albert Saints 4-games-to-2
Sherwood Park Crusaders defeated Fort Saskatchewan Traders 4-games-to-none

- 1986 Lost quarter-final

Sherwood Park Crusaders defeated Fort Saskatchewan Traders 4-games-to-1

- 1987 Lost quarter-final

Sherwood Park Crusaders defeated Fort Saskatchewan Traders 4-games-to-1

- 1988 Lost quarter-final

Hobbema Hawks defeated Fort Saskatchewan Traders 4-games-to-2

- 1989 Lost final

Fort Saskatchewan Traders defeated Lloydminster Blazers 4-games-to-2
Fort Saskatchewan Traders defeated Sherwood Park Crusaders 4-games-to-none
Red Deer Rustlers defeated Fort Saskatchewan Traders 4-games-to-1

- 1990 Lost quarter-final

Lloydminster Blazers defeated Fort Saskatchewan Traders 4-games-to-3

- 1991 Lost final

Fort Saskatchewan Traders defeated Sherwood Park Crusaders 4-games-to-none
Fort Saskatchewan Traders defeated Lloydminster Blazers 4-games-to-1
Calgary Royals defeated Fort Saskatchewan Traders 4-games-to-2

- 1992 Lost semi-final

Fort Saskatchewan Traders defeated St. Albert Saints 4-games-to-3
Olds Grizzlys defeated Fort Saskatchewan Traders 4-games-to-1

- 1993 Lost final

Fort Saskatchewan Traders defeated Sherwood Park Crusaders 5-games-to-4
Fort Saskatchewan Traders defeated St. Albert Saints 4-games-to-3
Olds Grizzlys defeated Fort Saskatchewan Traders 4-games-to-3

- 1994 Lost quarter-final

St. Albert Saints defeated Fort Saskatchewan Traders 4-games-to-3

- 1995 DNQ
- 1996 Lost quarter-final

Fort McMurray Oil Barons defeated Fort Saskatchewan Traders 4-games-to-none

- 1997 DNQ
- 1998 Lost final

Fort Saskatchewan Traders defeated Lloydminster Blazers 4-games-to-none
Fort Saskatchewan Traders defeated Grande Prairie Storm 4-games-to-1
St. Albert Saints defeated Fort Saskatchewan Traders 4-games-to-2

- 1999 Lost quarter-final

Lloydminster Blazers defeated Fort Saskatchewan Traders 4-games-to-3

- 2000 Lost quarter-final

Fort Saskatchewan Traders defeated St. Albert Saints 3-games-to-1
Lloydminster Blazers defeated Fort Saskatchewan Traders 4-games-to-none

- 2001 Lost preliminary

Grande Prairie Storm defeated Fort Saskatchewan Traders 3-games-to-2

- 2002 Lost preliminary

Drayton Valley Thunder defeated Fort Saskatchewan Traders 3-games-to-none

- 2003 DNQ
- 2004 DNQ
- 2005 Lost preliminary

Drayton Valley Thunder defeated Fort Saskatchewan Traders 3-games-to-none

- 2006 Lost preliminary

Spruce Grove Saints defeated Fort Saskatchewan Traders 3-games-to-none

- 2007 Lost final

Fort Saskatchewan Traders defeated Fort McMurray Oil Barons 4-games-to-none
Fort Saskatchewan Traders defeated Okotoks Oilers 4-games-to-1
Camrose Kodiaks defeated Fort Saskatchewan Traders 4-games-to-2

== Notable alumni ==
The following former Traders have gone on to play in the NHL:

- Dave Babych
- Jim Benning
- Mike Berger
- Keith Brown
- Mike Commodore
- Paul Comrie
- Taylor Fedun
- Matt Frattin
- Paul Healey
- Justin Hocking
- Pat MacLeod
- Clint Malarchuk
- Dave Marcinyshyn
- Richard Matvichuk
- John Mokosak
- Mike Needham
- Parry Pelensky
- Jim Playfair
- Grant Sasser
- Wally Schreiber
- Sheldon Souray
- Randy Turnbull
- Brad Werenka
- Gary Yaremchuk
- Ken Yaremchuk
- Zarley Zalapski

Traders who moved on to play for the Canadian Women's National & Olympic Teams:

- Shannon Szabados

== See also ==
- List of ice hockey teams in Alberta
