= John Hilworth =

Canadian ice hockey player (born 1957)

- Born: May 23, 1957 (age 68) Jasper, Alberta, Canada
- Height: 6 ft 4 in (193 cm)
- Weight: 205 lb (93 kg; 14 st 9 lb)
- Position: Defence
- Shot: Left
- Played for: NHL; Detroit Red Wings; AHL; Adirondack Red Wings
- NHL draft: 55th overall, 1977; Detroit Red Wings
- Playing career: 1977–1987

John Hilworth (born May 23, 1957) is a Canadian former professional ice hockey player who played 57 games in the National Hockey League for the Detroit Red Wings. Hilworth was born in Jasper, Alberta, Canada.

== Career statistics ==
=== Regular season and playoffs ===
			Regular season					Playoffs
Season	Team	League	GP	G	A	Pts	PIM	GP	G	A	Pts	PIM
1973–74	Medicine Hat Tigers	WCHL	13	0	2	2	11	—	—	—	—	—
1973–74	Drumheller Falcons	AJHL	57	10	28	38	161	—	—	—	—	—
1974–75	Medicine Hat Tigers	WCHL	70	1	12	13	146	5	0	3	3	10
1975–76	Medicine Hat Tigers	WCHL	67	3	17	20	257	5	1	1	2	33
1976–77	Medicine Hat Tigers	WHL	70	6	28	34	268	4	0	0	0	10
1977–78	Kansas City Red Wings	CHL	63	3	8	11	119	—	—	—	—	—
1977–78	Detroit Red Wings	NHL	5	0	0	0	12	—	—	—	—	—
1978–79	Kalamazoo Wings	IHL	2	1	2	3	7	—	—	—	—	—
1978–79	Kansas City Red Wings	CHL	42	2	14	16	107	3	0	0	0	16
1978–79	Detroit Red Wings	NHL	37	1	1	2	66	—	—	—	—	—
1979–80	Johnstown Red Wings	EHL	4	0	4	4	11	—	—	—	—	—
1979–80	Houston Apollos	CHL	12	2	2	4	36	6	0	3	3	12
1979–80	Adirondack Red Wings	AHL	29	0	2	2	83	—	—	—	—	—
1979–80	Detroit Red Wings	NHL	15	0	0	0	11	—	—	—	—	—
1980–81	Wichita Wind	CHL	64	3	12	15	144	13	1	3	4	42
1982–83	Fort Wayne Komets	IHL	82	16	46	62	171	10	2	6	8	33
1983–84	Fort Wayne Komets	IHL	75	10	20	30	124	6	0	0	0	11
1984–85	Toledo Goaldiggers	IHL	24	2	5	7	48	6	0	0	0	9
1986–87	Fort Wayne Komets	IHL	8	1	2	3	9	—	—	—	—	—
IHL totals			191	30	75	105	359	22	2	6	8	53
NHL totals			57	1	1	2	89	—	—	—	—	—
