= Earl Ingarfield Jr. =

American-born Canadian ice hockey player

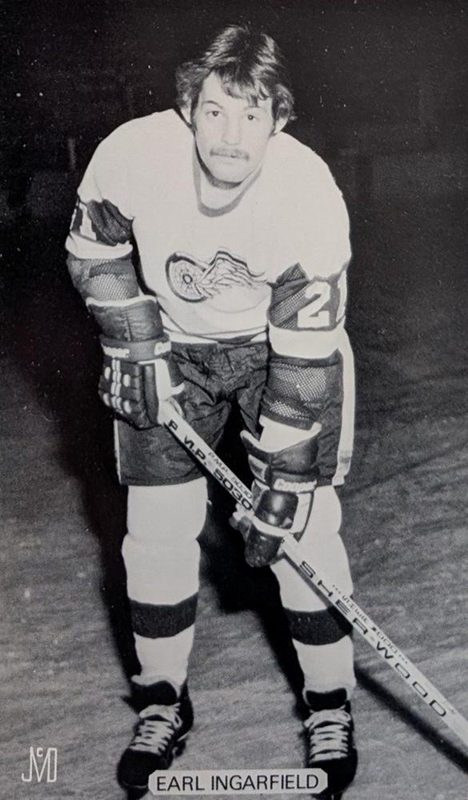
- Ingarfield Jr in 1980s postcard for Detroit Red Wings
- Born: January 30, 1959 (age 67) Manhasset, New York, U.S.
- Height: 6 ft 0 in (183 cm)
- Weight: 185 lb (84 kg; 13 st 3 lb)
- Position: Centre
- Shot: Left
- Played for: Atlanta Flames; Calgary Flames; Detroit Red Wings
- NHL draft: Undrafted
- Playing career: 1979–1987

Earl Thompson Ingarfield Jr. (born January 30, 1959) is an American former professional ice hockey centre who played 41 National Hockey League games for the Atlanta/Calgary Flames and Detroit Red Wings between 1979 and 1981. Ingarfield recorded four goals and four assists in 39 regular season games and added one assist in two playoff games for the Atlanta Flames.

He is the son of former NHL player Earl Ingarfield Sr. Ingarfield Jr. was born in Manhasset, New York, where he played in the Metropolitan Junior Hockey League. He moved to Canada and his father's hometown of Lethbridge, Alberta, as a teenager in order to hone his skills in the Western Canada Junior Hockey League.

== Career statistics ==
=== Regular season and playoffs ===
			Regular season					Playoffs
Season	Team	League	GP	G	A	Pts	PIM	GP	G	A	Pts	PIM
1975–76	Swift Current Broncos	SJHL	54	36	30	66	128	—	—	—	—	—
1976–77	Taber Golden Suns	AJHL	5	1	4	5	20	—	—	—	—	—
1976–77	Regina Pats	WCHL	26	1	0	1	38	—	—	—	—	—
1976–77	Lethbridge Broncos	WCHL	1	0	0	0	0	—	—	—	—	—
1977–78	Lethbridge Broncos	WCHL	65	25	25	50	127	8	3	4	7	6
1978–79	Lethbridge Broncos	WHL	70	43	46	89	84	19	8	10	18	10
1979–80	Birmingham Bulls	CHL	75	27	30	57	160	2	4	1	5	0
1979–80	Atlanta Flames	NHL	1	0	0	0	0	2	0	1	1	0
1980–81	Birmingham Bulls	CHL	23	7	9	16	47	—	—	—	—	—
1980–81	Calgary Flames	NHL	16	2	3	5	6	—	—	—	—	—
1980–81	Detroit Red Wings	NHL	22	2	1	3	16	—	—	—	—	—
1981–82	Adirondack Red Wings	AHL	68	24	19	43	86	2	0	1	1	4
1982–83	Adirondack Red Wings	AHL	65	11	26	37	60	1	0	1	1	2
1985–86	Springfield Indians	AHL	18	2	3	5	27	—	—	—	—	—
1985–86	Indianapolis Checkers	IHL	20	11	6	17	17	5	2	3	5	11
1986–87	Peoria Rivermen	IHL	33	8	11	19	18	—	—	—	—	—
AHL totals			151	37	48	85	173	3	0	2	2	6
NHL totals			39	4	4	8	22	2	0	1	1	0

== See also ==
- List of family relations in the National Hockey League
