= Bellingham Blazers =

American junior ice hockey team

- City: Bellingham, Washington; Langley, British Columbia
- League: British Columbia Junior Hockey League
- Operated: 1972–1985
- Home arena: Whatcom County Sports Arena
- Colors: Blue, red, and white

Franchise history
- 1972–1975: Bellingham Blazers
- 1975–1976: Maple Ridge Blazers
- 1976–1980: Bellingham Blazers
- 1980–1982: Vancouver Blue Hawks
- 1982–1985: Burnaby Blue Hawks

The Bellingham Blazers were an American junior ice hockey team from Bellingham, Washington, during the regular season and Langley, British Columbia, during their 1970s playoff runs. The team played their home games at the now defunct Whatcom County Sports Arena. They were members of the British Columbia Junior Hockey League.

== History ==
In 1975, the Blazers, playing out of Langley, British Columbia, won their first of two BCJHL championships. After defeating the Kelowna Buckaroos 4-games-to-2 to win the Nat Bailey Cup, the Blazers moved on to the British Columbia Jr. A Championship, the Mowat Cup, against the Coquitlam Comets of the Pacific Junior A Hockey League. The Blazers swept the PJHL champion 2-games-to-none. In the Alberta/British Columbia Championship, the Blazers fell to the Alberta Junior Hockey League's Spruce Grove Mets 4-games-to-2. After winning their two home games in Langley to start the series, the Blazers were beaten in Spruce Grove in four consecutive games to end their season.

For 1975–76, the Blazers relocated to Maple Ridge, British Columbia. They returned to Bellingham in the summer of 1976, but the league placed an expansion team known as the Maple Ridge Bruins for 1976–77 to replace the Blazers.

In 1979, the Blazers won the league title four-games-to-none over the Kamloops Rockets, but the Canadian Amateur Hockey Association banned them from proceeding into the national playdowns as they were playing their home games in the United States.

== Season-by-season record ==
Note: GP = Games Played, W = Wins, L = Losses, T = Ties, OTL = Overtime Losses, GF = Goals for, GA = Goals against

Season	GP	W	L	T	GF	GA	Pts	Finish	Playoffs
1972–73	60	15	43	2	232	358	32	4th BCJHL-C	Lost quarter-final
1973–74	64	29	35	0	246	251	58	2nd BCJHL-C	Lost semi-final
1974–75	66	33	32	1	313	251	67	3rd BCJHL-C	Won League, won Mowat Cup
1975–76	66	23	41	2	245	349	48	7th BCJHL	Lost quarter-final
1976–77	68	27	38	3	311	381	57	5th BCJHL-C	Did not qualify
1977–78	66	41	25	0	372	294	82	2nd BCJHL-C	Lost semi-final
1978–79	62	51	10	1	497	249	103	1st BCJHL-C	Won League
1979–80	66	49	16	1	415	241	99	1st BCJHL-C	Lost quarter-final
1980–81	43	19	24	0	204	230	38	5th BCJHL-C	Lost quarter-final
1981–82	48	20	28	0	280	297	40	5th BCJHL-C	Did not qualify
1982–83	56	29	25	2	319	321	60	4th BCJHL-C	Did not qualify
1983–84	50	19	30	1	242	310	39	5th BCJHL-C	Did not qualify
1984–85	52	41	10	1	408	273	83	1st BCJHL-C	Lost final

== NHL alumni ==
- Glenn Anderson
- Ken Berry
- Tony Camazzola
- Kevin Krook
- Brad Maxwell
- Tom McMurchy
- Harold Phillipoff
- Kevin Schamehorn
- Stan Smyl
- Wayne Van Dorp
- Miles Zaharko
